= 1996 USISL Premier League season =

USISL Premier League
- Season: 1996
- Champions: Central Coast Roadrunners (1st Title)
- Regular Season Champions: Central Coast Roadrunners (1st Title)
- Matches: 234
- Goals: 948 (4.05 per match)
- Best player: (Finland) Pasi Kinturi Nashville Metros
- Top goalscorer: (Finland) Pasi Kinturi Nashville Metros (19 Goals)
- Best goalkeeper: (United States) Michael LaBerge Colorado Springs Stampede

The 1996 USISL Premier League season was its second. The season began in April 1996 and ended in August 1996.

Central Coast Roadrunners won the championship, defeating the San Francisco Bay Seals 3–2. Spokane Shadow won the regular season title, winning 14 games to 2 losses.

== Changes from 1995 season ==
=== Name changes ===
- Ann Arbor Elites became the Michigan Madness.
- Arizona Cotton became the Arizona Phoenix.
- Montclair Standard Falcons moved to Fontana, CA and became the Fontana Falcons.
- Oklahoma City Slickers changed their name to the Oklahoma City Heat.
- San Francisco All-Blacks United changed their name to the San Francisco Bay Seals.
- Wichita Blue Angels changed their name to the Wichita Blue.

=== New teams ===
12 teams were added for the season.

Team	Area	Location	Previous affiliation
(Washington (state)) Bellingham Orcas	Northwest Washington area	Bellingham, WA	expansion
(California) Central Coast Roadrunners	Central West Coast area	San Luis Obispo, CA	expansion
Florida Strikers	Greater Miami area	Fort Lauderdale, FL	from USISL Pro
(Kentucky) Lexington Bluegrass Bandits	Lexington area	Lexington, KY	from USISL Pro
(Florida) Miami Tango	Greater Miami area	Miami, FL	expansion
Mid-Michigan Bucks	Flint/Tri-Cities area	Saginaw, MI	expansion
(Nebraska) Omaha Flames	Omaha-Council Bluffs area	Omaha, NE	expansion
(California) San Diego Top Guns	San Diego area	San Diego, CA	from USISL Pro
Southern California Gunners	Inland Empire area	San Bernardino, CA	expansion
(Washington (state)) Spokane Shadow	Spokane area	Spokane, WA	expansion
West Florida Fury	Emerald Coast area	Pensacola, FL	expansion
(Oregon) Willamette Valley Firebirds	Corvallis area	Corvallis, OR	former Portland Firebirds of the USISL Pro League

=== Teams leaving ===
Five teams folded after the 1995 season:

- Arkansas A's
- Columbia Heat
- Inland Empire Panteras
- North Bay Breakers
- Shasta Scorchers

== Standings ==
=== Central Conference ===
==== Northern Division ====
Pos	Team	Pld	W	PKW	L	GF	GA	GD	Pts	Qualification
1	Lexington Bluegrass Bandits	14	9	1	4	32	18	+14	28 (Note: Detroit, Kalamazoo, Lexington, and Michigan were all penalized 3 points.)	Division champion
2	Michigan Madness	14	8	1	5	22	26	−4	25	Team qualified for playoff berth
3	Detroit Dynamite	14	7	1	6	34	19	+15	22	
4	Mid-Michigan Bucks	14	7	1	6	24	18	+6	22	Team qualified for playoff berth
5	Kalamazoo Kingdom	14	5	0	9	18	22	−4	15	Team qualified for playoff berth
6	Grand Rapids Explosion (Note: Grand Rapids did not have a home stadium this year, and played only road games.)	7	0	0	7	6	21	−15	0	

==== Southern Division ====
Pos	Team	Pld	W	PKW	L	GF	GA	GD	Pts	Qualification
1	Austin Lone Stars	14	10	0	4	41	17	+24	30	Division champion
2	Omaha Flames	14	8	0	6	39	22	+17	24	Team qualified for playoff berth
3	Sioux City Breeze	13	7	2	4	26	23	+3	23 (Note: The game between Sioux City and Wichita was postponed and could not be rescheduled before end of the season. The game was cancelled because it had no effect on the playoffs.) (Note: Sioux City was penalized 6 points.)	Team qualified for playoff berth
4	Des Moines Menace	14	7	0	7	22	21	+1	21	Team qualified for playoff berth
5	Oklahoma City Heat	14	7	0	7	22	26	−4	21	
6	Wichita Blue	13	5	0	8	18	33	−15	15	

=== Eastern Conference ===
==== Northern Division ====
Pos	Team	Pld	W	PKW	L	GF	GA	GD	Pts	Qualification
1	Roanoke River Dawgs	14	10	0	4	49	26	+23	30	Division champion
2	Jackson Chargers	14	7	1	6	34	24	+10	22 (Note: Jackson was penalized 3 points.)	Team qualified for playoff berth
3	Nashville Metros	14	5	2	7	34	26	+8	17 (Note: Nashville was penalized 6 points.)	Team qualified for playoff berth
4	Birmingham Grasshoppers	14	4	0	10	20	33	−13	12	

==== Southern Division ====
Pos	Team	Pld	W	PKW	L	GF	GA	GD	Pts	Qualification
1	Cocoa Expos	14	9	1	4	45	22	+23	28 (Note: Cocoa, Florida, and Orlando were all penalized 3 points.)	Bye into semifinals as defending champion.
2	Orlando Lions	14	8	1	5	25	28	−3	25	
3	Florida Strikers	14	6	1	7	31	33	−2	19	Team qualified for playoff berth
4	West Florida Fury	14	5	0	9	29	36	−7	15	Team qualified for playoff berth
5	Miami Tango	14	4	0	10	29	37	−8	12	
6	South Florida Future	14	0	0	14	17	63	−46	0	

=== Western Conference ===
==== Northern Division ====
Pos	Team	Pld	W	PKW	L	GF	GA	GD	Pts	Qualification
1	Spokane Shadow	14	11	1	2	34	17	+17	34 (Note: Colorado Springs and Spokane were both penalized 3 points.)	Division champion
2	San Francisco Bay Seals	14	10	0	4	35	15	+20	30	Team qualified for playoff berth
3	Colorado Springs Stampede	14	8	1	5	20	12	+8	25	
4	Puget Sound Hammers	14	8	0	6	31	23	+8	24	Team qualified for playoff berth
5	Willamette Valley Firebirds	14	5	0	9	21	31	−10	15	
6	Bellingham Orcas	14	3	0	11	17	50	−33	9	

==== Southern Division ====
Pos	Team	Pld	W	PKW	L	GF	GA	GD	Pts	Qualification
1	Central Coast Roadrunners (R)	14	11	1	2	38	16	+22	34 (Note: Central Coast and San Diego were both penalized 3 points)	Division champion
2	San Diego Top Guns	14	8	1	5	28	22	+6	25	Team qualified for playoff berth
3	Arizona Phoenix	14	7	0	7	32	31	+1	21	Team qualified for playoff berth
4	Tucson Amigos	14	7	0	7	24	29	−5	21	
5	Fontana Falcons	14	5	0	9	31	32	−1	15	
6	Southern California Gunners	14	3	0	11	19	28	−9	9	

(R) Regular Season Champions

== Playoffs ==
=== Format ===
Central Coast received a bye to the PDL Semifinals as the defending champion.
The top four teams from every division except the Southwest earn playoff spots. With Central Coast already receiving a bye, the top two teams from the Southwest Division will play each other, however if Central Coast is in the top two, then the third place team receives a playoff spot. The Division winners would then face each other in the Conference finals.

=== Divisional brackets ===
Division Semifinals
NC1	Michigan Madness
NC4	Mid-Michigan Bucks	0
North Central Division
NC2	(Michigan) Detroit Dynamite	0
NC3	(Michigan) Kalamazoo Kingdom (AET)	1
C1	(Nebraska) Lincoln Brigade	0
C4	(Iowa) Des Moines Menace	4
Central Division
C2	(Nebraska) Omaha Flames	5
C3	(Iowa) Sioux City Breeze	3

Division Finals
NC1	Mid-Michigan Bucks (AET/PSO)	0 (1)
NC3	(Michigan) Kalamazoo Kingdom	0 (0)
C4	(Iowa) Des Moines Menace	6
C2	(Nebraska) Omaha Flames	0

Finals

=== Central Conference Playoffs ===
North Division Playoffs
August 2, 1996
Semifinals

Michigan Madness	2–3 (OT)	Mid-Michigan Bucks
Dennis Brose 31' (pen.); Solan 53'		22' 99' Scott Wieger; 28' Andrew Guest

Soisson-Rapacz-Clason Field
Kalamazoo, Michigan
August 2, 1996
Semifinals

(Michigan) Kalamazoo Kingdom	4–5 (a.e.t.)	(Kentucky) Lexington Bluegrass Bandits
Walker 12'; Wilson 73', 76', 83'	Report	20', 43' Marshall; 53' Gerak; 71' Hunt
Penalties
Londono (penalty scored)	1–3	(penalty scored) Thomas

Soisson-Rapacz-Clason Field
Kalamazoo, Michigan
Attendance: 1,142

August 3, 1996
North Division Final

(Kentucky) Lexington Bluegrass Bandits	0–1 (OT) (a.e.t.)	Mid-Michigan Bucks
Penalties
Penalty missed	0–1	(penalty scored) Tim Ritchey

Soisson-Rapacz-Clason Field
Kalamazoo, Michigan
South Division Playoffs
August 2, 1996
5:30 PM
Semifinals

(Texas) Austin Lone Stars	1–0 (OT)	(Iowa) Des Moines Menace
Chris Veselka 101'

Tranquility Park
Omaha, Nebraska
August 2, 1996
7:05 PM
Semifinals

(Nebraska) Omaha Flames	3–1	(Iowa) Sioux City Breeze
Paul Lekics (29:10); Johnny Torres (53:52); Johnny Anderson (88:59); Mark Haston (red card); Josh Bahr (yellow card); Kieth DeFini (yellow card)	Report	(yellow card) 50' (yellow-red card) 86' Brandon Jenkins; (85:16) Chris Reid

Tranquility Park
Omaha, Nebraska

August 3, 1996
South Division Final

(Nebraska) Omaha Flames	3–2 (OT)	(Texas) Austin Lone Stars
Johnny Torres (37:32); Brian Adams 46'; Marc Madeley (red card) 60'; Mike Bustos 99'	Report 1 report 2	(7:58) (red card) 65' Gabe Jones; 49' Chris Veselka

Tranquility Park
Omaha, Nebraska
Attendance: 1,100

Division Semifinals
SE1	(Florida) Cocoa Expos	5
SE4	(Florida) Miami Tango	2
SE2	South Florida Future	0
SE3	West Florida Fury	4

Division Finals
SE1	(Florida) Cocoa Expos	3
SE3	West Florida Fury	1
MS1	(Ohio) Cincinnati Riverhawks	0
MS2	(Mississippi) Jackson Chargers	3

Finals
SE1	(Florida) Cocoa Expos	2
MS2	(Mississippi) Jackson Chargers	1

=== Eastern Conference Playoffs ===
Eastern Conference Play In
August 2, 1996
8:00 PM
Play-In

(Virginia) Roanoke River Dawgs	1–2 (OT)	(Tennessee) Nashville Metros
Ian Spooner 35'	Report	83' Ken Hoey; 99' Doug Schenke

Victory Stadium
Roanoke, Virginia
Attendance: 1,010
August 3, 1996
Play-In

West Florida Fury	3–4 (a.e.t.)	Florida Strikers

Pensacola, Florida

August 9, 1996
8:00 PM
Semifinal

Florida Strikers	0–1	(Tennessee) Nashville Metros
		Tony Siikala

The Sports Club
Jackson, Mississippi

August 10, 1996
Eastern Conference Final

(Mississippi) Jackson Chargers	3–2 (OT)	Nashville Metros
Sheldon Bennett 23'; Dwayne Demmin 47'; Mickey Trottman 98:50'	Report	4' Pasi Kinturi; (44:25) Tony Siikala

The Sports Club
Jackson, Mississippi

Division Semifinals
NW1	(Washington (state)) Spokane Shadow	2
NW4	(Washington (state)) Puget Sound Hammers	1
Northwest Division
NW2	(Washington (state)) Yakima Reds	1
NW3	(Oregon) Cascade Surge	0
SW1	(California) San Gabriel Valley Highlanders	bye
Southwest Division
SW2	(Arizona) Tucson Amigos	bye

Division Finals
NW1	(Washington (state)) Spokane Shadow	2
NW2	(Washington (state)) Yakima Reds	0
SW1	(California) San Gabriel Valley Highlanders	2
SW2	(Arizona) Tucson Amigos	1

Western Finals
NW1	(Washington (state)) Spokane Shadow	0
SW1	(California) San Gabriel Valley Highlanders	1

=== Western Conference Playoffs ===
South Division Playoffs
August 2, 1996
5:30 PM PDT
Semifinals

(California) San Diego Top Guns	3–1	Arizona Phoenix

San Luis Obispo High School
San Luis Obispo, California
August 2, 1996
8:00 PM PDT
Semifinals

(California) Central Coast Roadrunners	7–0	(Arizona) Tucson Amigos
Joe Munoz (3:20); Marc Rohrer (16:45); Bryan Taylor (20:44), 35'; Mario Sanchez; Mike Matson		(red card) 43' Donny Duetch

San Luis Obispo High School
San Luis Obispo, California
Attendance: 1,200

August 3, 1996
South Division Final

(California) Central Coast Roadrunners	3–2	(California) San Diego Top Guns
	Report

San Luis Obispo High School
San Luis Obispo, California
Attendance: 1,100
North Division Playoffs
August 10, 1996
5:30 PM PDT
Semifinals

(Washington (state)) Spokane Shadow	2–1	(Washington (state)) Puget Sound Hammers
Tim Seely 63'; Zane Higgins 83'	Report	70' Ian Russell

Spokane Falls Community College
Spokane, Washington
Attendance: 1,712
August 10, 1996
Semifinals

(California) San Francisco Bay Seals	2–1	Colorado Springs Stampede
Troya Cowell 7'; Marco Bonaccorsi 30'	Report	42' Haugland

Spokane Falls Community College
Spokane, Washington

August 11, 1996
6:00 PM PDT
North Division Final

(Washington (state)) Spokane Shadow	2–3	(California) San Francisco Bay Seals
Stuart Saunders 7'; Chad Brown 80'	Report Part 1 Report Part 2	43', 81' Chris McDonald; 55' Mike Black

Spokane Falls Community College
Spokane, Washington
Attendance: 1,408
Referee: Neil Pinski

== Premier Six Tournament ==
Six teams entered the Premier Six Tournament in Cocoa, Florida the weekend of August 16–18. Each of the five division playoff champions qualified for the tournament, along with the host Cocoa Expos. The teams were seeded in this order, based on their regular season points:

1. Central Coast Roadrunners
2. San Francisco Bay Seals
3. Cocoa Expos
4. Omaha Flames
5. Jackson Chargers
6. Mid-Michigan Bucks.

The Central Coast Roadrunners played the bottom two seeds (Jackson and Mid-Michigan). The San Francisco Seals played the #4 and #6 seeds (Omaha and Mid-Michigan). The Cocoa Expos played and #4 and #5 seeds (Omaha and Jackson).

=== Qualification to the finals ===
In order to determine the two teams to qualify for the finals, the league used the following point system during the Premier Six Tournament:

- Win = 3 points
- Shootout win = 2 points
- Shootout loss = 1 point
- Bonus points: Each team scoring three or more goals in regulation or overtime received one extra point.

Place	Team	W	SW	SL	L	BP	PTS
1	Central Coast Roadrunners	2	0	0	0	1	7
2	San Francisco Bay Seals	1	0	1	0	1	5
3	Cocoa Expos	1	0	0	1	1	4
4	Omaha Flames	0	1	0	1	0	2
5	Jackson Chargers	1	0	0	1	0	2
6	Mid-Michigan Bucks	0	0	0	2	0	0

=== Friday ===
August 16, 1996
4:00 PM EST

(California) San Francisco Bay Seals (CA)	2-2 OT	(Nebraska) Omaha Flames (NE)
Chris McDonald 64'; Ken Folan 86'		3' Paul Lekics; 52' Keith DeFini
Penalties
Ken Folan (penalty missed); Marquis White (penalty missed); Shane Watkins (penalty scored); Chris McDonald (penalty missed); Mike Black (penalty missed)	1-2	(penalty scored) Keith DeFini; (penalty scored) John Anderson; (penalty missed) Paul Lekics; (penalty missed) Judd Willmann

Cocoa Expo Sports Center, Cocoa, Florida
August 16, 1996
6:00 PM EST

(California) Central Coast Roadrunners (CA)	3-0	Mid-Michigan Bucks (MI)
Bryan Taylor		(red card) 60' Alan Placek; (red card) 90' Doug Consigny

Cocoa Expo Sports Center, Cocoa, Florida
August 16, 1996
8:00 PM EST

(Florida) Cocoa Expos (FL)	0-1	(Mississippi) Jackson Chargers (MS)
		50' Sheldon Bennett

Cocoa Expo Sports Center, Cocoa, Florida

=== Saturday ===
August 17, 1996
4:00 PM EST

(California) Central Coast Roadrunners (CA)	2-1 OT	(Mississippi) Jackson Chargers (MS)
Marc Rohrer 45'; Bryan Taylor 92'		42' Dwyane Demmin

Cocoa Expo Sports Center, Cocoa, Florida
August 17, 1996
6:00 PM EST

(California) San Francisco Bay Seals (CA)	4-0	Mid-Michigan Bucks (MI)
Chris McDonal 58', 72', 76'; Shane Watkins 86'

Cocoa Expo Sports Center, Cocoa, Florida
August 17, 1996
8:00 PM EST

(Florida) Cocoa Expos (FL)	4-1	(Nebraska) Omaha Flames (NE)
Steve Freeman; Eddie Enders; Chris Brady; Steve Freeman		Paul Lekics (red card)

Cocoa Expo Sports Center, Cocoa, Florida

== Final ==
August 18, 1996

(California) Central Coast Roadrunners (CA)	1–0	(California) San Francisco Bay Seals (CA)
Bryan Taylor 48'

Cocoa Expo Sports Center, Cocoa, Florida
- Championship MVP: (United States) Bryan Taylor (CCR)

== Honors ==
- MVP: (Finland) Pasi Kinturi
- Points leader: (Finland) Pasi Kinturi
- Goals leader: (Finland) Pasi Kinturi
- Assists leader: (United States) Steve Freeman
- Rookie of the Year: (United States) Bryan Taylor
- Goalkeeper of the Year: (United States) Michael LaBerge
- Defender of the Year: (Trinidad and Tobago) Dwyane Demmin
- Coach of the Year: (Portugal) Nuno Piteira
- Organization of the Year: Central Coast Roadrunners
- All League
  - Goalkeeper: (United States) Michael LaBerge
  - Defenders: (United States) Steve Freeman, (Trinidad and Tobago) Dwyane Demmin, (United States) Zane Higgins, (United States) Jeremy Oetman
  - Midfielders: (United States) Jude Beller, (Finland) Toni Siikala
  - Forwards: (Finland) Pasi Kinturi, (United States) Chris McDonald, (United States) Dennis Brose, (United States) Bryan Taylor
