= 1996 Florida Strikers season =

Florida Strikers
1996 season
- USISL Premier League: Southern Division: Third place
- USISL playoffs: did not qualify
Home colors	Away colors

The 1996 Florida Strikers season was the first season of the new team in the United Systems of Independent Soccer Leagues, playing in the USISL Premier League. It was also the thirtieth season of the club in professional soccer. Previously the club had been named Fort Lauderdale Strikers and fielded a team in the USISL Professional League. This year, the team finished in third place in the Southern Division, and did not make the playoffs.

== Competitions ==
=== USISL Premier League regular season ===
Blue denotes team has won their division.
Green denotes team has won playoff spot.
Orange denotes team gets bye into semifinals as defending champion.

==== Central Conference ====
===== Northern Division =====
Place	Team	P	W	L	SW	GF	GA	GD	Points
1	Lexington Bluegrass Bandits*	14	10	4	1	32	18	+14	28
2	Michigan Madness*	14	9	5	1	24	28	-4	25
3	Detroit Dynamite*	14	8	6	1	34	19	+15	22
4	Mid-Michigan Bucks*	14	8	6	1	24	18	+6	22
5	Kalamazoo Kingdom	14	5	9	0	18	22	-4	15
6	Grand Rapids Explosion**	7	0	7	0	6	21	+15	0

* Detroit, Kalamazoo, Lexington, and Michigan were all penalized 3 points.
** Grand Rapids did not have a home stadium this year, and played only road games.

===== Southern Division =====
Place	Team	P	W	L	SW	GF	GA	GD	Points
1	Austin Lone Stars	14	10	4	0	41	17	+24	30
2	Omaha Flames	14	8	6	0	39	22	+17	24
3	Sioux City Breeze*	13	9	4	2	26	23	+3	23
4	Des Moines Menace	14	7	7	0	22	21	+1	21
5	Oklahoma City Heat	14	7	7	0	22	26	-4	21
6	Wichita Blue	13	5	8	0	18	33	-15	15

* Sioux City was penalized 6 points.
The game between Sioux City and Wichita was postponed and could not be rescheduled before end of the season. The game was cancelled because it had no effect on the playoffs.

==== Eastern Conference ====
===== Northern Division =====
Place	Team	P	W	L	SW	GF	GA	GD	Points
1	Roanoke River Dawgs	14	10	4	0	48	28	+20	30
2	Jackson Chargers*	14	8	6	1	34	24	+10	22
3	Nashville Metros*	14	7	7	2	34	26	+8	17
4	Birmingham Grasshoppers	14	4	10	0	20	33	-13	12

* Nashville was penalized 6 points. Jackson was penalized 3 points.

===== Southern Division =====
Place	Team	P	W	L	SW	GF	GA	GD	Points
1	Cocoa Expos*	14	10	4	1	45	22	+23	28
2	Orlando Lions*	14	9	5	1	25	28	-3	25
3	Florida Strikers*	14	7	7	1	31	33	-2	19
4	West Florida Fury	14	5	9	0	29	36	-7	15
5	Miami Breakers	14	4	10	0	29	37	-8	12
6	South Florida Future	14	0	14	0	17	63	-46	0

* Cocoa, Florida, and Orlando were all penalized 3 points.

==== Western Conference ====
===== Northern Division =====
Place	Team	P	W	L	SW	GF	GA	GD	Points
1	Spokane Shadow*	14	12	2	1	34	17	+17	34
2	San Francisco Bay Seals	14	10	4	0	35	15	+20	30
3	Colorado Springs Stampede*	14	9	5	1	20	12	+8	25
4	Puget Sound Hammers	14	8	6	0	31	23	+8	24
5	Willamette Valley Firebirds	14	5	9	0	21	31	-10	15
6	Bellingham Orcas	14	3	11	0	17	50	-33	9

* Colorado Springs and Spokane were both penalized 3 points.

===== Southern Division =====
Place	Team	P	W	L	SW	GF	GA	GD	Points
1	Central Coast Roadrunners*	14	12	2	1	38	16	+22	34
2	San Diego Top Guns*	14	9	5	1	28	22	+6	25
3	Arizona Phoenix	14	7	7	0	32	31	+1	21
4	Tucson Amigos	14	7	7	0	24	29	-5	21
5	Fontana Falcons	14	5	9	0	31	32	-1	15
6	Southern California Gunners	14	3	11	0	19	28	-9	9

* Central Coast and San Diego were both penalized 3 points
