= 1995 USISL Premier League season =

USISL Premier League
- Season: 1995
- Champions: Richmond Kickers (1st Title)
- Regular Season Champions: San Francisco All-Blacks United (1st Title)
- Matches: 243
- Goals: 1,001 (4.12 per match)
- Best player: (United States) Gabe Jones Austin Lone Stars
- Top goalscorer: (United States) Jeff Dresser Grand Rapids Explosion, (United States) Gabe Jones Austin Lone Stars (20 Goals Each)
- Best goalkeeper: (United States) Alfredo Estrada Birmingham Grasshoppers

The 1995 USISL Premier League season was the 1st season of the new "fourth level" of American soccer following the re-organization of the old United States Interregional Soccer League at the end of 1994. The season began in April 1995 and ended in August 1995.

Richmond Kickers finished the season as national champions, beating Cocoa Expos 3–1 in the USISL Premier League Championship game. San Francisco All-Blacks United finished with the best regular season record in the league, winning 17 out of their 18 games, suffering just one loss, and finishing with a +42 goal difference.

The USISL Premier League format in 1995 was notable for not having tied games; instead, teams competed in a penalty shoot-out to decide a winner, with bonus points awarded as appropriate.

== Teams ==
27 teams started the league this year. They all played in the USISL the year before, with the exception of six new teams.

Team name	Metro area	Location	Notes
(Michigan) Ann Arbor Elites	Detroit Metro area	Ann Arbor, MI	expansion team
Arizona Cotton	Phoenix area	Glendale, AZ	
Arkansas A's	Little Rock area	Sherwood, AR	
(Texas) Austin Lone Stars	Austin, Texas	Austin, TX	
(Alabama) Birmingham Grasshoppers	Birmingham area	Birmingham, AL	
(Florida) Cocoa Expos	Space Coast area	Cocoa, FL	
Colorado Springs Stampede	Colorado Springs area	Colorado Springs, CO	expansion team
(South Carolina) Columbia Heat	Columbia area	Columbia, SC	
(Iowa) Des Moines Menace	Des Moines area	Des Moines, IA	
(Michigan) Grand Rapids Explosion	Grand Rapids area	Grand Rapids, MI	expansion team
(California) Inland Empire Panteras	Inland Empire area	San Bernardino, CA	expansion team
(Mississippi) Jackson Chargers	Jackson area	Jackson, MS	expansion team
(California) Montclair Standard Falcons	Inland Empire area	Montclair, CA	
(Tennessee) Nashville Metros	Nashville area	Nashville, TN	
(California) North Bay Breakers	North Bay area	Santa Rosa, CA	
Oklahoma City Slickers	Oklahoma City area	Oklahoma City, OK	
(Florida) Orlando Lions	Central Florida area	Orlando, FL	
(Washington (state)) Puget Sound Hammers	Puget Sound area	Tacoma, WA	expansion team
(Virginia) Richmond Kickers	Richmond area	Richmond, VA	
(Virginia) Roanoke River Dawgs	Roanoke area	Roanoke, VA	
(California) San Francisco All-Blacks United	San Francisco area	San Francisco, CA	
(California) Shasta Scorchers	Sacramento Valley area	Redding, CA	
(Iowa) Sioux City Breeze	Sioux City area	Sioux City, IA	
South Florida Future	Gold Coast area	Boca Raton, FL	previously the South Florida Flamingos
(Arizona) Tucson Amigos	Tucson area	Tucson, AZ	
(Washington, D.C.) Washington Mustangs	National Capital area	Washington, DC	
(Kansas) Wichita Blue	Wichita area	Wichita, KS	

== Standings ==
=== Eastern Division ===
Pos	Team	Pld	W	L	GF	GA	GD	BP	Pts	Qualification
1	Cocoa Expos	18	16	2	62	20	+42	42	138	Division champion
2	Richmond Kickers	18	15	3	47	21	+26	38	128	Qualified for playoff berth
3	Nashville Metros	18	12	6	47	34	+13	41	113	Qualified for playoff berth
4	Jackson Chargers	18	13	5	43	26	+17	31	109	Qualified for playoff berth
5	Birmingham Grasshoppers	18	10	8	45	46	−1	37	97	Qualified for playoff berth
6	Washington Mustangs	18	7	11	30	42	−12	31	73	
7	Roanoke River Dawgs	18	5	13	40	51	−11	29	59	
8	Orlando Lions	18	4	14	31	63	−32	27	51	
9	Columbia Heat	18	4	14	30	47	−17	21	45	
10	South Florida Future	16	3	13	15	44	−29	16	34	

Source: rsssf.com

=== Central Division ===
Pos	Team	Pld	W	L	GF	GA	GD	BP	Pts	Qualification
1	Sioux City Breeze	18	11	7	55	37	+18	35	101	Division champion
2	Austin Lone Stars	18	10	8	57	30	+27	38	98	Qualified for playoff berth
3	Des Moines Menace	18	10	8	53	37	+16	37	97	Qualified for playoff berth
4	Oklahoma City Slickers	18	7	11	28	51	−23	25	67	Qualified for playoff berth
5	Wichita Blue	18	6	12	32	63	−31	29	65	
6	Grand Rapids Explosion	18	3	15	30	71	−41	27	45	
7	Ann Arbor Elites	18	4	14	22	54	−32	18	42	
8	Arkansas A's	18	2	16	17	67	−50	17	29	

Source: rsssf.com

=== Western Division ===
Pos	Team	Pld	W	L	GF	GA	GD	BP	Pts	Qualification
1	San Francisco All-Blacks United (R)	18	17	1	46	24	+22	40	142	Division champion
2	Tucson Amigos	18	12	6	38	26	+12	30	102	Qualified for playoff berth
3	Colorado Springs Stampede	18	11	7	49	28	+21	36	102	Qualified for playoff berth
4	North Bay Breakers	18	10	8	40	40	0	36	96	Qualified for playoff berth
5	Puget Sound Hammers	18	10	8	35	28	+7	30	90	
6	Arizona Cotton	18	7	11	35	50	−15	28	70	
7	Montclair Falcons	18	6	12	29	42	−13	22	58	
8	Inland Empire Panteras	18	5	13	24	56	−32	23	53	
9	Shasta Scorchers	18	1	17	21	73	−52	20	26	

Source: rsssf.com
(R) Regular Season Champions

== Playoffs ==
Eastern Semifinals
E1	(Florida) Cocoa Expos	3
E4	(Mississippi) Jackson Chargers	1
E2	(Tennessee) Nashville Metros	2
E3	(Alabama) Birmingham Grasshoppers	3

Eastern Finals
E1	(Florida) Cocoa Expos	3
E3	(Alabama) Birmingham Grasshoppers	1

Eastern Division Playoffs
August 4, 1995
6:00 PM
Semifinals

(Florida) Cocoa Expos	3–1	(Mississippi) Jackson Chargers
Ian Gill; Eddie Enders; Keiran Breslin	Report	Joel Carver

Birmingham–Southern Soccer Complex
Birmingham, Alabama
August 4, 1995
8:00 PM
Semifinals

(Alabama) Birmingham Grasshoppers	3–2 (OT) (a.e.t.)	(Tennessee) Nashville Metros
Holger Schneidt

Birmingham–Southern Soccer Complex
Birmingham, Alabama

August 5, 1995
6:00 PM
Third Place Game

(Tennessee) Nashville Metros	4–3 (a.e.t.)	(Mississippi) Jackson Chargers

Birmingham–Southern Soccer Complex
Birmingham, Alabama
August 5, 1995
8:00 PM
Division Final

(Alabama) Birmingham Grasshoppers	1–3	(Florida) Cocoa Expos
Mike Bryson 52'	Report	48' Scott Armstrong; 49' Robin Chan; 56' Kirk Mackey

Birmingham–Southern Soccer Complex
Birmingham, Alabama

Central Semifinals
C1	(Iowa) Sioux City Breeze	7
C4	Oklahoma City Slickers	0
C2	(Texas) Austin Lone Stars	2
C3	(Iowa) Des Moines Menace	3

Central Finals
C1	(Iowa) Sioux City Breeze	0
C3	(Iowa) Des Moines Menace	1

Central Division Playoffs
August 4, 1995
6:00 PM
Semifinals

(Iowa) Sioux City Breeze	7–0	Oklahoma City Slickers
Richard "Salty" Markham (0:19); Brian Adams 6' (29:15); Jake Neiroda (52:35)	Report

Cara McGrane Memorial Stadium
Des Moines, Iowa
August 4, 1995
8:00 PM
Semifinals

(Iowa) Des Moines Menace	3–2 OT (a.e.t.)	(Texas) Austin Lone Stars
Aaron Leventhal (8:24); Vinnie Darnell (49:51); Josh Bahr 61'	Report	(24:10) Matt Presley; (59:38) Darin Talley

Cara McGrane Memorial Stadium
Des Moines, Iowa

August 5, 1995
6:00 PM
Third Place Game

(Texas) Austin Lone Stars	4–1	Oklahoma City Slickers
	Report

Cara McGrane Memorial Stadium
Des Moines, Iowa
August 5, 1995
8:00 PM
Division Final

(Iowa) Des Moines Menace	1–0	(Iowa) Sioux City Breeze
Roel Crauer (17:18)	Report

Cara McGrane Memorial Stadium
Des Moines, Iowa
Attendance: 669

Western Semifinals
W1	(California) San Francisco All-Blacks United	6
W2	(Arizona) Tucson Amigos	2
W3	Colorado Springs Stampede	2
W4	(California) North Bay Breakers	0

Western Finals
W1	(California) San Francisco All-Blacks United	1
W3	Colorado Springs Stampede	0

Western Division Playoffs
August 5, 1995
Semifinals

Colorado Springs Stampede	2–0	(California) North Bay Breakers
35'; 55'

Negoesco Stadium
San Francisco, California
August 5, 1995
7:00 PM
Semifinals

(California) San Francisco All-Blacks United	6–2	(Arizona) Tucson Amigos

Negoesco Stadium
San Francisco, California

August 6, 1995
Division Final

(California) San Francisco All-Blacks United	1–0	Colorado Springs Stampede

Negoesco Stadium
San Francisco, California

PDL Semifinals
W1	(California) San Francisco All-Blacks United	0
H	(Virginia) Richmond Kickers	1
E1	(Florida) Cocoa Expos	3
C3	(Iowa) Des Moines Menace	1

PDL Finals
H	(Virginia) Richmond Kickers	3
E1	(Florida) Cocoa Expos	1

== Sizzlin' Four ==
=== Semifinals ===
August 9, 1995

(Virginia) Richmond Kickers (VA)	0–0	(California) San Francisco United All Blacks (CA)
	(Report)
Penalties
Kevin Scott (penalty scored); Robert Ukrop (penalty scored); Brian Kamler (penalty scored); Khary Stockton (penalty missed)	3–2	(penalty missed); (penalty scored) Mike Carlson; (penalty scored) Albertin Montoya (penalty missed); (penalty missed) Mike Black

City Stadium, Richmond, Virginia
August 9, 1995

(Florida) Cocoa Expos (FL)	3–1	(Iowa) Des Moines Menace (IA)
Dave Mackey; Robin Chan; Dylan Lewis		Chad Candrell

City Stadium, Richmond, Virginia

=== Runner-up ===
August 11, 1995

(California) San Francisco United All Blacks (CA)	4–1	(Iowa) Des Moines Menace (IA)
Albertin Montoya	(Report)	Roel Crauler

City Stadium, Richmond, Virginia

=== Final ===
August 11, 1995

(Virginia) Richmond Kickers (VA)	3–1	(Florida) Cocoa Expos (FL)
Brian Kamler (11:40), 16'; Robert Ukrop (57:44)	(Report) Report 2	(48:44) Mark Phillips

City Stadium, Richmond, Virginia
Attendance: 5,231
- MVP: (United States) Brian Kamler (RIC)

== Points leaders ==
Rank	Scorer	Club	GP	Goals	Assists	Points
1	(United States) Gabe Jones	Austin Lone Stars	15	20	8	48
2	(Germany) Holger Schneidt	Birmingham Grasshoppers	15	17	9	43
3	(United States) Jeff Dresser	Grand Rapids Explosion	16	20	2	42
4	(United States) Brian Adams	Sioux City Breeze	16	18	4	40
4	(United States) Eddie Enders	Cocoa Expos	18	15	8	38
6	(Finland) Toni Siikala	Nashville Metros	15	15	4	34
7	(England) Richard Sharpe	Cocoa Expos	6	14	2	30
7	(United States) Adrian Gonzalez	North Bay Breakers	16	13	0	26
8	(United States) Aaron Leventhal	Des Moines Menace	15	10	4	24
9	(United States) Robert Ukrop	Richmond Kickers	15	10	4	24
10	(United States) Sean Gibson	Birmingham Grasshoppers	?	11	2	24

== Honors ==
- Most Valuable Player: (United States) Robert Ukrop, Richmond Kickers
- Points leader: (United States) Gabe Jones, Austin Lone Stars (48 points)
- Goals leader: (United States) Gabe Jones, Austin Lone Stars (20 goals)
- Rookie of the Year: (Spain) Eduardo Yoldi
- Assist Leader: (Germany) Holger Schneidt, Birmingham Grasshoppers (9 assists)
- Goalkeeper of the Year: (United States) Alfredo Estrada
- Coach of the Year: (United States) Blair Reed and (United States) Doug Mello
- Organization of the Year: Richmond Kickers
