= 1997 PDSL season =

Premier Development Soccer League
- Season: 1997
- Champions: Central Coast Roadrunners (2nd Title)
- Regular Season Champions: Spokane Shadow (1st Title)
- Matches: 239
- Goals: 965 (4.04 per match)
- Best Player: (Trinidad and Tobago) Lester Felician Jackson Chargers
- Top goalscorer: (Brazil) Rordigo Costa Detroit Dynamite (21 Goals)
- Best goalkeeper: (United States) Alan Beilke Central Coast Roadrunners
- Longest winless run: 16 Games Southwest Florida Manatees Entire Season
- Longest losing run: 16 Games Southwest Florida Manatees Entire Season

The 1997 Premier Development Soccer League season was its 3rd. The season began in April 1997 and ended in August 1997.

Central Coast Roadrunners successfully defended the championship, defeating the Cocoa Expos 3-2. Spokane Shadow won the regular season title, winning 14 games to 2 losses.

== Changes from 1996 season ==
=== Name changes ===
- Miami Tango changed their name to Miami Breakers.
- Puget Sound Hammerheads merged with the D-3 Pro's Everett BigFoot to become Puget Sound BigFoot.
- Southern California Gunners changed their name to Southern California Chivas.

=== New teams ===
7 teams were added for the season.

| Team | Area | Location | Previous affiliation |
|---|---|---|---|
| Alabama Saints | Birmingham area | Birmingham, AL | expansion |
| (Oregon) Cascade Surge | Willamette Valley Area | Salem, OR | from USISL Pro League |
| (Ohio) Cincinnati Riverhawks | Greater Cincinnati area | Cincinnati, OH | expansion |
| (Nebraska) Lincoln Brigade | Lincoln Area | Lincoln, NE | expansion |
| (California) San Gabriel Valley Highlanders | Greater Los Angeles area | Glendale, CA | expansion |
| Southwest Florida Manatees | Southwest Florida area | Cape Coral, FL | expansion |
| (Washington (state)) Yakima Reds | Yakima area | Yakima, WA | from USISL Pro League |

=== Teams Leaving ===
The Nashville Metros were promoted to the A League. The Arizona Sahuaros (formerly the Arizona Phoenix), Austin Lone Stars, Fort Lauderdale Strikers (formerly Florida Strikers), and San Francisco Bay Seals were promoted to the D-3 Pro League.

6 teams folded after the 1996 season:

- Birmingham Grasshoppers
- Fontana Falcons
- Oklahoma City Heat
- Orlando Lions
- Roanoke River Dawgs
- San Diego Top Guns

The Wichita Blue went on hiatus for this year, and the Willamette Valley Firebirds went on hiatus for the next two years.

== Standings ==
=== Central Conference ===
==== Central Division ====
| Pos | Team | Pld | W | PKW | PKL | L | GF | GA | GD | Pts | Qualification |
|---|---|---|---|---|---|---|---|---|---|---|---|
| 1 | Lincoln Brigade | 16 | 10 | 2 | 0 | 4 | 34 | 23 | +11 | 32 (Note: Lincoln and Twin Cities were both penalized 6 points.) | Division champion |
| 2 | Omaha Flames | 16 | 7 | 0 | 1 | 8 | 42 | 29 | +13 | 21 | Qualified for playoff berth |
| 3 | Sioux City Breeze | 16 | 8 | 0 | 0 | 8 | 26 | 38 | −12 | 24 | Qualified for playoff berth |
| 4 | Des Moines Menace | 16 | 6 | 1 | 0 | 9 | 29 | 27 | +2 | 19 (Note: Des Moines was penalized 3 points.) | Qualified for playoff berth |
| 5 | Colorado Springs Stampede | 16 | 6 | 0 | 1 | 9 | 23 | 33 | −10 | 18 | |
| 6 | Twin Cities Tornado | 16 | 3 | 2 | 1 | 10 | 29 | 39 | −10 | 11 | |

Source: rsssf.com

==== North Central Division ====
| Pos | Team | Pld | W | PKW | PKL | L | GF | GA | GD | Pts | Qualification |
|---|---|---|---|---|---|---|---|---|---|---|---|
| 1 | Mid-Michigan Bucks | 16 | 12 | 0 | 1 | 3 | 41 | 24 | +17 | 36 | Division champion |
| 2 | Detroit Dynamite | 16 | 9 | 1 | 2 | 4 | 41 | 20 | +21 | 28 (Note: Detroit, Grand Rapids, and Michigan were all penalized 3 points.) | Qualified for playoff berth |
| 3 | Kalamazoo Kingdom | 16 | 8 | 2 | 1 | 5 | 32 | 25 | +7 | 26 (Note: Kalamazoo was penalized 6 points.) | Qualified for playoff berth |
| 4 | Grand Rapids Explosion | 16 | 7 | 1 | 1 | 7 | 35 | 27 | +8 | 22 | Qualified for playoff berth |
| 5 | Michigan Madness | 16 | 0 | 1 | 0 | 15 | 11 | 66 | −55 | 1 | |

Source: rsssf.com

=== Eastern Conference ===
==== Mid-South Division ====
| Pos | Team | Pld | W | PKW | PKL | L | GF | GA | GD | Pts | Qualification |
|---|---|---|---|---|---|---|---|---|---|---|---|
| 1 | Cincinnati Riverhawks | 15 | 10 | 0 | 0 | 5 | 48 | 28 | +20 | 30 (Note: Game between Cincinnati and Tucson was unable to be rescheduled before season's end, games was cancelled because it had no impact on playoffs.) | Division champion |
| 2 | Jackson Chargers | 16 | 9 | 1 | 0 | 6 | 50 | 25 | +25 | 28 (Note: Chattanooga and Jackson were both penalized 3 points.) | Qualified for playoff berth |
| 3 | Lexington Bluegrass Bandits | 16 | 8 | 2 | 3 | 3 | 45 | 22 | +23 | 26 (Note: Lexington was penalized 6 points.) | Qualified for playoff berth |
| 4 | Alabama Saints | 16 | 5 | 0 | 1 | 10 | 31 | 34 | −3 | 15 | Qualified for playoff berth |
| 5 | Chattanooga Express | 16 | 4 | 1 | 0 | 11 | 18 | 54 | −36 | 13 | |

Source: rsssf.com

==== Southeast Division ====
| Pos | Team | Pld | W | PKW | PKL | L | GF | GA | GD | Pts | Qualification |
|---|---|---|---|---|---|---|---|---|---|---|---|
| 1 | Cocoa Expos | 16 | 11 | 1 | 2 | 2 | 46 | 23 | +23 | 34 (Note: Cocoa and South Florida were both penalized 3 points.) | Division champion |
| 2 | South Florida Future | 16 | 10 | 1 | 0 | 5 | 42 | 22 | +20 | 31 | Qualified for playoff berth |
| 3 | West Florida Fury | 16 | 8 | 2 | 1 | 5 | 32 | 23 | +9 | 26 (Note: West Florida was penalized 6 points.) | Qualified for playoff berth |
| 4 | Miami Breakers | 16 | 8 | 0 | 1 | 7 | 41 | 24 | +17 | 24 | Qualified for playoff berth |
| 5 | Southwest Florida Manatees | 16 | 0 | 0 | 0 | 16 | 9 | 74 | −65 | 0 | |

Source: rsssf.com

=== Western Conference ===
==== Northwest Division ====
| Pos | Team | Pld | W | PKW | PKL | L | GF | GA | GD | Pts | Qualification |
|---|---|---|---|---|---|---|---|---|---|---|---|
| 1 | Spokane Shadow (R) | 16 | 14 | 0 | 0 | 2 | 37 | 16 | +21 | 42 | Division champion |
| 2 | Yakima Reds | 16 | 7 | 0 | 1 | 8 | 31 | 31 | 0 | 21 | Qualified for playoff berth |
| 3 | Cascade Surge | 16 | 6 | 2 | 1 | 7 | 28 | 23 | +5 | 23 (Note: Cascade and Puget Sound were both penalized 3 points.) | Qualified for playoff berth |
| 4 | Bellingham Orcas | 16 | 6 | 0 | 1 | 9 | 26 | 40 | −14 | 18 | Qualified for playoff berth |
| 5 | Puget Sound BigFoot | 16 | 4 | 1 | 0 | 11 | 27 | 39 | −12 | 13 | |

Source: rsssf.com
(R) Regular Season Champions

==== Southwest Division ====
| Pos | Team | Pld | W | PKW | PKL | L | GF | GA | GD | Pts | Qualification |
|---|---|---|---|---|---|---|---|---|---|---|---|
| 1 | San Gabriel Valley Highlanders | 16 | 12 | 0 | 0 | 4 | 43 | 20 | +23 | 36 | Division champion |
| 2 | Central Coast Roadrunners | 16 | 10 | 1 | 2 | 3 | 34 | 17 | +17 | 34 | Bye into semifinals as defending champion |
| 3 | Tucson Amigos | 15 | 5 | 1 | 0 | 9 | 18 | 41 | −23 | 16 (Note: Southern California and Tucson were both penalized 3 points) (Note: Game between Cincinnati and Tucson was unable to be rescheduled before season's end, games was cancelled because it had no impact on playoffs.) | Qualified for playoff berth |
| 4 | Southern California Chivas | 16 | 3 | 1 | 0 | 12 | 16 | 32 | −16 | 10 | |

Source: rsssf.com

== Playoffs ==
=== Format ===
Central Coast received a bye to the PDL Semifinals as the defending champion.
The top four teams from every division except the Southwest earn playoff spots. With Central Coast already receiving a bye, the top two teams from the Southwest Division will play each other, however if Central Coast is in the top two, then the third place team receives a playoff spot. The Division winners would then face each other in the Conference finals.

=== Divisional brackets ===
Division Semifinals
NC1 | Mid-Michigan Bucks | 4
NC4 | (Michigan) Grand Rapids Explosion | 3
North Central Division
NC2 | (Michigan) Detroit Dynamite | 0
NC3 | (Michigan) Kalamazoo Kingdom (AET) | 1
C1 | (Nebraska) Lincoln Brigade | 0
C4 | (Iowa) Des Moines Menace | 4
Central Division
C2 | (Nebraska) Omaha Flames | 5
C3 | (Iowa) Sioux City Breeze | 3

Division Finals
NC1 | Mid-Michigan Bucks (AET/PSO) | 0 (1)
NC3 | (Michigan) Kalamazoo Kingdom | 0 (0)
C4 | (Iowa) Des Moines Menace | 6
C2 | (Nebraska) Omaha Flames | 0

Central Finals
NC1 | Mid-Michigan Bucks | 3
C4 | (Iowa) Des Moines Menace | 0

Central Conference Division Semifinals
July 25, 1997
6:00 PM
Semifinals

| (Iowa) Des Moines Menace | 4–0 | (Nebraska) Lincoln Brigade |
|---|---|---|
| Jamie Phillips (43:39); Eric Wilson (61:22); Justin Sells (75:44) | Report |

Phelps Field
Omaha, Nebraska
July 25, 1997
7:00 PM
Semifinals

| (Michigan) Grand Rapids Explosion | 3–4 | Mid-Michigan Bucks |
|---|---|---|
| Rob Irvine (pen.), 70'; Sean Toohey 72', 87' | | 23' Paul Snape; 33' Tino Scicluna; 39' Joe Malachino; 62' Dennis Brose |

Calvin College
Grand Rapids, Michigan
July 25, 1997
7:30 PM
Semifinals

| (Michigan) Kalamazoo Kingdom | 1–0 (OT) | (Michigan) Detroit Dynamite |
|---|---|---|
| Chris Adrian 97' | Report |

Ed Annen Complex
Kalamazoo, Michigan
Attendance: 1,205
July 25, 1997
8:00 PM
Semifinals

| (Nebraska) Omaha Flames | 5–3 | (Iowa) Sioux City Breeze |
|---|---|---|
| Jamie Harris (14:54); Matt Caution (38:07); Billy Duranzo (81:25); Danny Herrera (86:43) | Report 1 Report 2 | (5:45) Brian Hagan; (63:21) Alex Vasquez; (74:05) Hakeem Koroma; (red card) Prince Peters |

Phelps Field
Omaha, Nebraska
Attendance: 983

Central Division Finals
July 26, 1997
7:30 PM
Central Division Final

| (Nebraska) Omaha Flames | 0–6 | (Iowa) Des Moines Menace |
|---|---|---|
| | Report | (11:43) Miguel Calderon; (23:19) Craig Scheer; (64:30) Eric Wilson; (77:34) Jamie Phillips; (84:50) Adam Buseck |

Phelps Field
Omaha, Nebraska
Attendance: 845
July 26, 1997
8:00 PM
North Central Final

| Mid-Michigan Bucks | 0–0 (a.e.t.) | (Michigan) Kalamazoo Kingdom |
Penalties
| Paul Snape (penalty scored); Joe Malachino (penalty scored); Mali Walton (penalty scored); Drew Drummonds (penalty scored) | 4–3 | Penalty scored Penalty missed |

West Ottawa High School
Holland, Michigan

August 2, 1997
Central Conference Final

| Mid-Michigan Bucks | 3–0 | (Iowa) Des Moines Menace |
|---|---|---|
| Dennis Brose 26', 75'; Paul Snape 60' | Report |

White Pine Stadium
Saginaw Township, Michigan
Attendance: 730

Division Semifinals
SE1 | (Florida) Cocoa Expos | 5
SE4 | (Florida) Miami Breakers | 2
Southeast Division
SE2 | South Florida Future | 0
SE3 | West Florida Fury | 4
MS1 | (Ohio) Cincinnati Riverhawks | 7
MS4 | Alabama Saints | 4
Mid-South Division
MS2 | (Mississippi) Jackson Chargers (AET) | 1
MS3 | (Kentucky) Lexington Bluegrass Bandits | 0

Division Finals
SE1 | (Florida) Cocoa Expos | 3
SE3 | West Florida Fury | 1
MS1 | (Ohio) Cincinnati Riverhawks | 0
MS2 | (Mississippi) Jackson Chargers | 3

Eastern Finals
SE1 | (Florida) Cocoa Expos | 2
MS2 | (Mississippi) Jackson Chargers | 1

Eastern Conference Division Semifinals
July 25, 1997
6:00 PM
Semifinals

| South Florida Future | 0–4 | West Florida Fury |

Cocoa Expo Sports Center
Cocoa, Florida
July 25, 1997
6:00 PM
Semifinals

| (Ohio) Cincinnati Riverhawks | 7–4 | Alabama Saints |
|---|---|---|
| Craig Yaks; Shawn Rockey; J.T Roberts; Ryan Schaffer; Maurice Schilten | Report |

The Sports Club
Jackson, Mississippi
July 25, 1997
8:00 PM
Semifinals

| (Florida) Cocoa Expos | 5–2 | (Florida) Miami Breakers |

Cocoa Expo Sports Center
Cocoa, Florida
July 25, 1997
8:00 PM
Semifinals

| (Mississippi) Jackson Chargers | 1–0 (OT) (a.e.t.) | (Kentucky) Lexington Bluegrass Bandits |
|---|---|---|
| Lester Felician |

The Sports Club
Jackson, Mississippi

Eastern Conference Division Finals
July 26, 1997
7:30 PM
Southeast Division Final

| (Florida) Cocoa Expos | 3–1 | West Florida Fury |
|---|---|---|
| | Report |

Cocoa Expo Sports Center
Cocoa, Florida
Attendance: 750
July 26, 1997
7:30 PM
Mid-South Division Final

| (Mississippi) Jackson Chargers | 3–0 | (Ohio) Cincinnati Riverhawks |
|---|---|---|
| Dominic Schell 43'; Lester Felician | Report |

The Sports Club
Jackson, Mississippi
Attendance: 1,200

August 2, 1997
Eastern Conference Final

| (Florida) Cocoa Expos | 2–1 | (Mississippi) Jackson Chargers |
|---|---|---|
| Fitzgerald Haig 14'; Eddie Enders 58' | Report | 69' Dean Farrar |

Cocoa Expo Sports Center
Cocoa, Florida
Attendance: 1,500

Division Semifinals
NW1 | (Washington (state)) Spokane Shadow (AET/PSO) | 4 (1)
NW4 | (Washington (state)) Bellingham Orcas | 4 (0)
Northwest Division
NW2 | (Washington (state)) Yakima Reds | 1
NW3 | (Oregon) Cascade Surge | 0
SW1 | (California) San Gabriel Valley Highlanders | bye
Southwest Division
SW2 | (Arizona) Tucson Amigos | bye

Division Finals
NW1 | (Washington (state)) Spokane Shadow | 2
NW2 | (Washington (state)) Yakima Reds | 0
SW1 | (California) San Gabriel Valley Highlanders | 2
SW2 | (Arizona) Tucson Amigos | 1

Western Finals
NW1 | (Washington (state)) Spokane Shadow | 0
SW1 | (California) San Gabriel Valley Highlanders | 1

Western Conference Division Semifinals
July 26, 1997
6:00 PM
Semifinals

| (Washington (state)) Spokane Shadow | 4–4 (a.e.t.) | (Washington (state)) Bellingham Orcas |
|---|---|---|
| Ryan Edwards 19'; Dave Berto 75', 80'; Zane Higgins 81' | Report | 6' Jesus Fuentes; 29', 63' Scot Swanson; 62' Robbie Berg |
Penalties
| Tim Seeley (penalty missed); Dave Berto (penalty missed); Jeff Rose (penalty scored); Joe Ascolese (penalty scored) | 2–1 | (penalty scored) Greg St. Germain |

Joe Albi Stadium
Spokane, Washington
Attendance: 1,708
July 26, 1997
8:00 PM
Semifinals

| (Washington (state)) Yakima Reds | 1–0 | (Oregon) Cascade Surge |
|---|---|---|
| Davidson Feital 36' | Report |

Joe Albi Stadium
Spokane, Washington

Western Conference Division Finals
July 27, 1997
6:00 PM
Northwest Division Final

| (Washington (state)) Spokane Shadow | 2–0 | (Washington (state)) Yakima Reds |
|---|---|---|
| Craig Waibel 49'; Dave Berto 77' (pen.) | Report 1 Report 2 |

Joe Albi Stadium
Spokane, Washington
Attendance: 1,258
July 27, 1997
7:00 PM
Southwest Division Final

| (California) San Gabriel Valley Highlanders | 2–1 | (Arizona) Tucson Amigos |

Citrus College
Glendora, California

Western Conference Final
August 2, 1997
Western Conference Final

| (Washington (state)) Spokane Shadow | 0–1 | (California) San Gabriel Valley Highlanders |
|---|---|---|
| | Report | 73' (pen.) Sarkis Banyan |

Joe Albi Stadium
Spokane, Washington
Attendance: 1,875

=== PDSL Finals Brackets ===
PDSL Semifinals
NC1 | Mid-Michigan Bucks | 0
H | (California) Central Coast Roadrunners | 2
SW1 | (California) San Gabriel Valley Highlanders | 0 (0)
SE1 | (Florida) Cocoa Expos (AET/PSO) | 0 (1)

PDSL Finals
H | (California) Central Coast Roadrunners | 2
SE1 | (Florida) Cocoa Expos | 1
PDSL Third Place
NC1 | Mid-Michigan Bucks | 2
SW1 | (California) San Gabriel Valley Highlanders | 3

PDSL National Semifinals
August 8, 1997
6:00 PM PDT
Semifinals

| (Florida) Cocoa Expos | 0–0 | (California) San Gabriel Valley Highlanders |
Penalties
| | 3–1 |

Mustang Stadium
San Luis Obispo, California
August 8, 1997
8:00 PM PDT
Semifinals

| (California) Central Coast Roadrunners | 2–0 | Mid-Michigan Bucks |
|---|---|---|
| Joe Munoz 34'; Craig Tomlinson 43' | Report |

Mustang Stadium
San Luis Obispo, California
Attendance: 1,000

Third Place Game
August 9, 1997
6:00 PM PDT

| Mid-Michigan Bucks | 2–3 | (California) San Gabriel Valley Highlanders |
|---|---|---|
| Mike Rawlins 34'; Paul Snape (89:49) | Report | Grant Shakhbazyan; 35' Roni Der Saarkissian; 88' Arshak Abyanli |

Mustang Stadium
San Luis Obispo, California
PDSL National Championship Game
August 9, 1997
8:00 PM PDT

| (California) Central Coast Roadrunners | 2–1 | (Florida) Cocoa Expos |
|---|---|---|
| Joe Munoz; Craig Tomlinson 85' | Report | 88' Wally Senk |

Mustang Stadium
San Luis Obispo, California
Attendance: 1,600

Championship MVP: (United States) Joe Munoz (CCR)

== Honors ==
- Organization of the Year: Kalamazoo Kingdom
- Executive of the Year: Jeff Robbins, Spokane Shadow
- Fair Play Award: Detroit Dynamite
