= List of USL League Two teams =

Below is a list of all the teams that ever have played, or will play, in USL League Two, formerly the Premier Development League.

Name	Year entered	Year exited
Abbotsford 86ers Select / Abbotsford 86ers / Abbotsford Athletes in Action	1998	2000
AC Connecticut / Connecticut FC Azul	2012	present
AC Houston Sur	2022	present
AHFC Royals	2018	present
Ajax Orlando Prospects	2004	2006
Alabama Saints	1997	2000
Akron City FC	2025	present
Albany BWP Highlanders / Albany Admirals / Albany Blackwatch Highlanders	2003	2010
Annapolis Blues FC	2025	present
Apotheos FC	2025	present
Arizona Arsenal SC	2024	2024
Arizona Phoenix / Arizona Cotton	1995	1996
Arkansas A's	1995	1995
Atlanta Silverbacks U23's	2006	2008
Atlanta Blackhawks	2009	present
Augusta Fireball United	2005	2006
Austin Aztex U23	2008	2009
Austin Lightning	2002	2007
Austin Lone Stars	1995	1996
Bakersfield Brigade	2005	2009
Ballard FC	2022	present
Baltimore Bohemians	2012	2016
Baton Rouge Capitals	2007	2011
Bavarian United SC	2025	present
Bellingham Orcas	1996	1997
Bermuda Hogges	2010	2012
Bigfoot FC	2025	present
Birmingham Grasshoppers	1995	1996
Birmingham Hammers	2018	2018
Black Rock FC	2018	present
Blackwatch Rush	2022	present
Blue Goose SC	2022	2024
Boston City FC	2022	present
Boston Rams	2013	2015
Boston Victory	2012	2012
Brazos Valley Cavalry F.C.	2017	present
Brooklyn Knights	1999	2012
Broward County Wolfpack	2000	2000
Burlingame Dragons FC	2015	2017
BYU Cougars	2003	2017
Caledonia FC	2022	present
Calgary Foothills FC	2015	2021
Calgary Storm	2001	2001
Calgary Storm Prospects / Calgary Storm Select	2003	2004
California Gold	2005	2006
Cape Cod Crusaders	2001	2008
Capital FC / Portland Timbers U23's	2009	2024
Cary Clarets / Cary RailHawks U23's / Raleigh Elite	2002	2009
Cascade Surge	1997	2009
Central Coast Roadrunners	1996	2002
Central Jersey Spartans	2010	2013
Central Jersey Riptide	1999	2000
Central Valley Fuego FC 2	2022	present
Charlotte Eagles	2015	present
Chattanooga Express	1997	1997
Chesapeake Dragons	2001	2004
Chicago City SC	2022	2024
Chicago Dutch Lions FC	2022	present
Chicago Eagles Select	2001	2002
Chicago FC United	2017	present
Chicago Fire Premier / Chicago Fire Reserves	2001	2016
Chicago Inferno	2012	2014
Chicago Sockers	1999	2000
Chico Rooks	2002	2002
Christos FC	2022	present
Cincinnati Riverhawks	1997	1997
Cincinnati Dutch Lions	2014	2020
Cincinnati Kings	2008	2012
City SC	2025	present
Clarksville Gunners	1999	1999
Cleveland Internationals	2004	2010
Colorado International Soccer Academy	2022	present
Cleveland Force SC	2022	present
Cocoa Expos	1995	2007
Colorado Pride Switchbacks U23	2018	present
Colorado Rapids U23's / Boulder Rapids Reserve / Boulder Nova	2000	2008
Colorado Rapids U-23	2017	2018
Colorado Springs Ascent / Colorado Springs Stampede	1995	2001
Colorado Springs Blizzard	2004	2006
Columbia Heat	1995	1995
Columbus Shooting Stars	2003	2004
Columbus United FC	2025	present
Commonwealth Cardinals FC	2022	present
Corpus Christi FC	2018	present
Davis Legacy SC	2022	present
Dayton Dutch Lions	2010	present
Dayton Gemini / Dayton Gems	2000	2002
Daytona Rush SC	2019	2020
Delaware Dynasty	2006	2007
Delaware FC	2025	present
Denton Diablos	2025	present
D.C. United U-23	2013	2014
Denver Cougars / Colorado Comets	1998	2002
Derby City Rovers / River City Rovers	2010	2018
Des Moines Menace	1995	present
Detroit Dynamite	1996	1998
DFW Tornados / Texas Spurs	2001	2010
Eastside FC	2020	2020
El Paso Patriots / Chivas El Paso Patriots	2004	2013
Erie Sports Center	2025	present
FC Boston	2016	present
FC Boulder U23	2017	2017
FC Cleburne	2017	2018
FC Florida U23 / Treasure Coast Tritons / North County United / South Florida Surf	2016	2020
FC Golden State Force	2016	present
FC Jax Destroyers	2011	2012
F.C. Madison	1996	1996
FC Miami City	2015	present
FC Motown	2021	present
FC Tucson	2012	present
FC Wichita	2021	2023
Flatirons Rush SC / Colorado Rush SC	2020	present
Flint City Bucks / Michigan Bucks / Mid-Michigan Bucks	1996	present
Florida Elite Soccer Academy	2024	2024
Florida Strikers	1996	1996
Floridians FC / Fort Lauderdale Schulz Academy	2010	2016
Fontana Falcons / Montclair Standard Falcons	1995	1996
Fort Lauderdale United	2025	present
Forest City London	2009	2015
FC Miami City	2025	present
Fort Wayne FC	2021	present
Fort Wayne Fever	2003	2009
Fraser Valley Mariners / Abbotsford Mariners / Abbotsford Rangers	2003	2012
Fredericksburg Gunners	2007	2009
Fredericksburg Hotspur	2011	2012
Fresno FC U-23 / Fresno Fuego	2003	2019
GFI Woodlands	2025	present
GPS Portland Phoenix	2010	2020
Green Bay Voyageurs FC	2019	2022
Greenville Lions	2003	2003
Hollywood United Hitmen	2009	2010
Houston Dutch Lions / Texas Dutch Lions	2012	2015
Houston Leones	2008	2010
Houston Toros	2001	2002
Houston FC	2017	present
Hudson Valley Hammers	2022	present
IMG Academy Bradenton / Bradenton Academics	1998	2018
Indiana Blast	2004	2004
Indiana Invaders	1998	2011
Inland Empire Panteras	1995	1995
Jackson Chargers	1995	1999
Jersey Express S.C. / Newark Ironbound Express	2008	2017
Jersey Falcons	2001	2004
Jersey Shore Boca	2003	2003
Kalamazoo FC	2021	present
Kalamazoo Kingdom	1996	2006
Kalamazoo Outrage	2008	2010
Kansas City Brass	1998	2013
Kaw Valley FC	2018	present
Kings Hammer Columbus	2025	present
Kings Hammer FC	2021	present
Kings Hammer Sun City	2025	present
Kitsap Pumas	2009	2016
K–W United FC / Hamilton FC Rage	2011	2017
Kokomo Mantis FC	2016	2016
Lafayette Swamp Cats	2004	2004
Lakeland Tropics	2017	present
LA Laguna FC / Golden State Misioneros / Los Angeles Misioneros / Los Angeles Azul Legends / Los Angeles Legends / Los Angeles Storm	2006	2016
LA Parish AC	2022	present
Lancaster Rattlers	2007	2010
Lansing City Football	2022	present
Lansing Locomotive	1998	1998
Lansing United	2018	2018
Laredo Heat	2004	2025
Las Vegas Mobsters	2014	2016
Lexington Bluegrass Bandits	1996	2000
Lexington SC	2025	present
Lincoln Brigade	1997	1997
Lionsbridge FC	2018	present
Little Rock Rangers	2021	present
Lonestar SC	2025	present
Long Island Rough Riders	2007	present
Los Angeles Heroes / San Fernando Valley Heroes	1999	2002
Louisiana Krewe FC	2022	present
Louisiana Outlaws	2000	2003
Marin FC Legends	2022	present
McKinney Chupacabras	2025	present
Memphis Express	2002	2005
Memphis City FC	2018	2018
Miami AC	2022	present
Miami Strike Force / Miami Breakers / Miami Tango	1996	2001
Miami Tango	1998	1999
Michiana Lions	2025	present
Michigan Madness / Ann Arbor Elites	1995	1997
Midland/Odessa Sockers / West Texas United Sockers	2009	2017
Midwest United FC	2022	present
Minneapolis City SC	2022	present
Mississippi Brilla	2007	present
Montgomery United FC	2025	present
Morris Elite SC	2021	present
Myrtle Beach Mutiny	2017	2018
Nashville Metros	1995	2012
Nashville SC U23	2017	2017
Nevada Wonders	2003	2005
Nevada Zephyrs	1999	2000
New Brunswick Brigade	2000	2000
NJ-LUSO Parma / NJ-LUSO Rangers FC / New Jersey Rangers	2008	present
New England FC	2025	present
New Jersey Copa FC	2021	present
New Jersey Stallions	2004	2004
New Orleans Jesters / New Orleans Shell Sockers	2003	present
New York Capital District Shockers	1999	1999
New York Freedom	1999	2001
New York Red Bulls U-23	2015	2021
Next Academy Palm Beach / Palm Beach Suns FC	2015	2018
NONA FC	2022	present
North Bay Breakers	1995	1995
North Carolina Fusion U23 / Carolina Dynamo	2004	2024
North Jersey Imperials	1995	2001
Northern Arizona Prospectors	1998	1998
Northern Indiana FC	2025	present
Northern Virginia FC / Evergreen FC / D.C. United U-23 / Northern Virginia Royals	2006	present
Ocala Stampede	2012	2015
Ocean City Nor'easters / South Jersey Barons / Ocean City Barons	2003	present
Ogden Outlaws	2006	2012
Okanagan Predators	2001	2001
Okanagan Valley Challenge	1998	1998
Oklahoma City Heat	1996	1996
Oklahoma City Slickers	1995	1995
Oklahoma City PDL	2013	2013
OKC Energy U23	2016	2018
Oly Town FC	2022	present
Omaha Flames	1996	1998
One Knoxville SC	2022	2022
Orange County Blue Star	2002	2012
Orlando City U-23 / Central Florida Kraze / Central Florida Lionhearts	1998	2015
Orlando Lions	1995	1996
Orlando Nighthawks	1999	1999
Ottawa Fury	2005	2013
OVF Alliance / TFA Willamette	2020	present
Palm Beach Pumas	2000	2008
Palmetto FC Bantams	2012	present
Panama City Beach Pirates / Panama City Pirates	2008	2014
Pathfinder FC / FC Málaga City New York	2021	2024
Patuxent Football Athletics	2022	present
PDX FC	2021	present
Peachtree City MOBA	2016	present
Philadelphia Lone Star FC	2024	2024
Pittsburgh Riverhounds U23	2014	2016
Portland Bangers FC	2025	present
Project 51O	2021	present
Puget Sound Gunners FC / North Sound SeaWolves	2011	2015
Reading United / Reading Rage	2004	present
Real Central New Jersey	2021	present
Real Colorado Foxes	2009	2015
Real Maryland F.C.	2007	2012
Red River FC	2025	present
Redlands FC	2022	present
Rhode Island Stingrays	2002	2009
Richmond Kickers	1995	1995
Richmond Kickers Future	2002	2008
Rio Grande Valley Bravos	2009	2010
Roanoke River Dawgs	1995	1996
Rochester Thunder	2009	2010
Rockford Raptors	1999	2000
Round Rock SC	2021	present
St. Croix SC	2022	present
Saint Louis FC U23 / Springfield Synergy FC / Springfield Demize	2007	2017
St. Louis Lions	2006	present
St. Louis Scott Gallagher	2021	2021
St. Louis Strikers	2003	2004
St. Louis Jazz	1994	1997
Salt City SC / Ogden City SC	2018	present
San Diego Gauchos	2005	2006
San Diego Top Guns	1996	1996
San Diego Zest FC	2016	present
San Fernando Valley Heroes	1999	2002
San Fernando Valley Quakes	2006	2008
San Francisco Seals / San Francisco Bay Seals / San Francisco All Blacks	1995	2008
San Francisco City FC	2016	present
San Francisco Glens SC	2018	present
San Gabriel Valley Highlanders	1997	2001
San Jose Frogs	2007	2008
San Juan SC	2025	present
Santa Barbara Sharks	2002	2002
Santa Cruz Breakers FC	2018	2021
Santafé Wanderers FC	2025	present
Sarasota Metropolis FC	2019	2019
Seacoast United Phantoms / New Hampshire Phantoms	2008	present
Seattle BigFoot / Puget Sound BigFoot / Puget Sound Hammers	1995	1998
Seattle Sounders Select / Seattle Hibernians	1998	2002
Seattle Sounders FC U-23 / Tacoma Tide / Tacoma FC	2006	2019
Shasta Scorchers	1995	1995
Silicon Valley Ambassadors	1998	1999
SIMA Águilas	2017	2018
Sioux City Breeze	1995	1999
Sioux Falls Spitfire	2001	2007
Snohomish United	2025	present
SoCal Surf	2017	2017
Southern California Chivas / Southern California Gunners	1996	1998
Southern California Seahorses	2001	present
South Florida Future	1995	2000
Southern West Virginia King's Warriors	2012	2016
Southwest Florida Manatees	1997	1997
Spokane Shadow	1996	2005
Spokane Spiders	2007	2010
Springfield ASC	2022	present
Springfield FC	2025	present
Springfield Storm	2005	2005
Sporting Club Jacksonville	2025	present
St. Charles FC	2024	2024
St. Louis Ambush FC	2025	present
Stars FC	2025	present
Steel City FC	2025	present
Sunflower State FC	2025	present
Swan City SC	2025	2025
SW Florida Adrenaline	2013	2016
Tampa Bay Hawks	2000	2002
Tampa Bay Rowdies U23	2017	2020
Tampa Bay United SC	2021	2024
Tennessee SC	2022	present
Team St. Louis	1999	1999
The Villages SC	2016	present
Thunder Bay Chill	2000	2024
Tobacco Road FC	2017	present
Toledo Slayers	2003	2005
Toledo Villa FC	2021	present
Tormenta FC	2016	2018
Tormenta FC 2	2019	present
Toronto Lynx	2007	2014
Tri-Cities Otters	2016	2022
TSS FC Rovers	2017	2020
Tucson Amigos	1995	1999
Twin Cities Phoenix / Twin Cities Tornado	1997	2001
United PDX	2024	2024
Utah Avalanche	2024	2024
Ventura County Fusion	2007	present
Vancouver Whitecaps FC U-23	2008	2014
Vermont Green FC	2022	present
Vermont Voltage	1999	2014
Victoria Highlanders	2009	2019
Victoria Umbro Select	1998	1998
Virginia Legacy / Williamsburg Legacy	2001	2009
Virginia Beach Piranhas / Hampton Roads Piranhas / Virginia Beach Submariners	2006	2013
VSI Tampa Bay FC (PDL) / VSI Tampa Flames	2012	2013
Washington Crossfire / Seattle Wolves	2009	2016
Washington Mustangs	1995	1995
West Chester United SC	2020	present
West Dallas Kings	2001	2001
West Florida Fury	1996	1997
Western Mass Pioneers	2010	present
West Michigan Edge / Western Michigan Explosion / Grand Rapids Explosion	1995	2008
West Virginia United / West Virginia Alliance FC / West Virginia Chaos	2003	present
Westchester Flames	1999	present
Weston FC	2017	present
Wichita Blue / Wichita Blue Angels	1995	1999
Wichita Jets	2001	2001
Willamette Valley Firebirds	1996	2000
Wilmington Hammerheads	2017	2017
Wisconsin Rebels / Fox River Rebels	1998	2004
Worcester Hydra	2012	2012
Worcester Kings	2002	2003
WSA Winnipeg	2011	present
Yakima Reds	1997	2010
