= Jeff Dresser =

American soccer player

Personal information
- Full name: Jeffrey Paul Dresser
- Date of birth: December 30, 1973 (age 52)
- Place of birth: Flint, Michigan, U.S.
- Height: 6 ft 0 in (1.83 m)
- Position: Midfielder

Youth career
- 1991–1994: Cornerstone University

Senior career*
| Years | Team | Apps | (Gls) |
| 1995 | Grand Rapids Explosion | 16 | (20) |
| 1996–1997 | Charlotte Eagles | 50 | (11) |
| 1998–2003 | Indiana Blast | 136 | (46) |
| Total | | 202 | (77) |
- * Club domestic league appearances and goals

Jeff Dresser is an American retired soccer midfielder who played professionally in the USL A-League.

Dresser played for the Michigan Arrows youth club growing up. He graduated from Flint Southwestern Academy, then attended Cornerstone University, where he was a 1993 NAIA Second-Team All-American In 1994, he earned First-Team All-American honors. In 1995, Dresser, while playing for the Grand Rapids Explosion, tied with Gabe Jones for the goal scoring lead in the 1995 USISL Premier League season. In 1996, he turned professional with the Charlotte Eagles in the USISL Pro League. In 1997, the Eagles moved down to the USISL D-3 Pro League. In 1998, Dresser left the Eagles to sign with the Indiana Blast. In 1999, the Blast moved up from the D-3 Pro League to the USL A-League. Dresser remained with Indiana through the 2003 season. In 2020, Jeff Dresser led the Carmel Christian Cougars to their first state soccer title and a sixth-place finish in the national power rankings. This led to him winning the 2021 NCSCA 4A Coach of the year.
