= Senator Dugger =

Senator Dugger may refer to:

- Tom J. Dugger (1948–2026), Oklahoma State Senate
- William Dugger (fl. 1870s), Arkansas State Senate
