= Michael LaBerge =

American soccer player

Personal information
- Date of birth: 26 February 1975 (age 51)
- Place of birth: Dover, New Hampshire, U.S.
- Height: 6 ft 2 in (1.88 m)
- Position: Goalkeeper

Youth career
- 1993: Yavapai College
- 1994–1996: Evansville Purple Aces

Senior career*
Years	Team	Apps	(Gls)
1995–1996	Colorado Springs Stampede		
1997–1998	Nashville Metros	12	(0)
2000	Hershey Wildcats	7	(0)
- * Club domestic league appearances and goals

Michael LaBerge is an American retired soccer goalkeeper. LaBerge was the 1996 USISL Premier League Goalkeeper of the Year and played professionally in the USL A-League.

In 1993, LaBerge played for Yavapai College. Summer of 1994 He played for Arizona Cotton in the USISL. In the Fall of 1994 he transferred to the University of Evansville where he played out the last three years of his collegiate eligibility. In 1995, during the collegiate off-season, LaBerge played for the Colorado Springs Stampede of the USISL Premier League. He played for them again in 1996 and was named the 1996 USISL Premier League Goalkeeper of the Year While at the University of Evansville, LaBerge in his collegiate career was named Missouri Valley Conference defensive player of the week 4 different times and once Soccer America Magazine goalkeeper of the week. LaBerge in his sophomore collegiate season was named to the Missouri Valley Conference Tournament team, 2nd Team Missouri Valley All Conference, 3rd Team All Region. In his 1996 Senior season, LaBerge was awarded 1st Team Missouri Valley All Conference honors. Also in his 1996 senior campaign, he was crowned champions of the Missouri Valley Conference Tournament in a 3–2 overtime thriller verses Creighton University. For his efforts in the match he was also named Tournament MVP. LaBerge finished his college career with a loss to Indiana University the first round of the NCAA tournament. LaBerge's final piece of hardware at Evansville in 1996 was a team Most Valuable Player award. In January 1997, LaBerge was invited to the MLS goalkeeping combine which was in conjunction with the college all-star weekend. LaBerge opted to turn professional with the Nashville Metros of the USISL A-League, spending two seasons with them. He finished his professional career with the Hershey Wildcats in 2000.
