= Craig Tomlinson =

Jamaican footballer (born 1972)

Personal information
- Date of birth: 31 October 1972 (age 54)
- Place of birth: Westmoreland, Jamaica
- Height: 5 ft 9 in (1.75 m)
- Position: Forward

Youth career
- 1996–1997: Fresno State Bulldogs
- 1998: Ohio State Buckeyes

Senior career*
| Years | Team | Apps | (Gls) |
| 1997–1998 | Central Coast Roadrunners | | |
| 1999 | Tennessee Rhythm | 23 | (12) |
| 1999–2000 | Wichita Wings (indoor) | 36 | (9) |
| 2000–2008 | Seattle Sounders | 119 | (10) |
| 2011 | North Sound SeaWolves | 14 | (2) |
- * Club domestic league appearances and goals as of 4 June 2011

Craig Tomlinson (born 31 October 1972) is a former Jamaican footballer.

== Career ==
=== College and amateur ===
Tomlinson began his collegiate soccer career at Fresno State University before transferring to Ohio State University for the 1998 season. In1997 and 1998, Tomlinson spent the collegiate off-season with the Central Coast Roadrunners of the Premier Development League.

=== Professional ===
Tomlinson turned professional in 1999 when he joined the Tennessee Rhythm of the USL A-League. That fall, he signed with the Wichita Wings of the National Professional Soccer League In 2000, he signed with the Seattle Sounders of the USL First Division. While he was a consistent starter, he lost most of the 2002 season and the entire 2005 season after tearing his anterior cruciate ligament in preseason. He retired at the conclusion of the 2008 season, having played 119 league games and scored 10 goals for the Sounders over the course of 8 seasons.

Tomlinson returned to the field with the announcement on 18 March 2011 that he signed with North Sound SeaWolves in the American fourth tier USL Premier Development League.

== Honors ==
=== Seattle Sounders ===
- USL First Division Championship (1): 2007
