= Brady Ballew =

American soccer player (born 1992)

Personal information
- Full name: Brady James Ballew
- Date of birth: July 3, 1992 (age 34)
- Place of birth: Everett, Washington, U.S.
- Height: 1.80 m (5 ft 11 in)
- Position: Midfielder

Youth career
- 2004–2010: Snohomish United

College career
Years	Team	Apps	(Gls)
2010–2014	Seattle U Redhawks	72	(13)

Senior career*
Years	Team	Apps	(Gls)
2011–2014	Puget Sound Gunners	39	(11)
2015–2017	Tulsa Roughnecks	64	(6)
2018	Tulsa Athletic	3	(1)
- * Club domestic league appearances and goals as of 19 April 2021

Brady James Ballew (born July 3, 1992) is an American retired professional soccer player who played as a midfielder.

== Career ==
=== Early career ===
A 2010 graduate of Marysville-Pilchuck High school and a four-year varsity starter, Ballew helped lead the Tomahawks to their first state appearance since 1985 and a fourth-place finish his junior year. During his senior year he was awarded Seattle Times All-Area and WESCO North MVP and leading goal scorer. Later was awarded first team all-state, second team all-state, two-time all-area first team, two-time first team All-Wesco and two-time honorable mention.

Ballew played college soccer at Seattle University between 2010 and 2014. He was the captain for 3 years leading his team to an NCAA tournament appearance his senior year. Ballew was named Tournament MVP and to the All-Tournament Team of Aaron Olitsky Memorial Classic in Charleston, S.C. his senior year.

Ballew also appeared for USL PDL club Puget Sound Gunners between 2011 and 2014.

=== Professional ===
Ballew signed with United Soccer League club Tulsa Roughnecks in March 2015. He was a finalist for the USL Rookie of the Year in 2015. He placed first among fan voting. Since retiring from professional soccer he has gone on to open a cafe and hot yoga studio in downtown Tulsa. His band, MORE&MORE is set to release new music in 2022.
