= Robin Chan (footballer) =

Malaysian former footballer and coach

Personal information
- Date of birth: January 8, 1968 (age 58)
- Place of birth: Kuala Lumpur, Malaysia
- Positions: Forward; midfielder

College career
Years	Team	Apps	(Gls)
1987–1990	Florida Tech Panthers		

Senior career*
Years	Team	Apps	(Gls)
1992–1993	Orlando Lions		
1994–1995	Cocoa Expos		
1997	Carolina Dynamo	26	(0)
1998	Orlando Nighthawks		
2003–2005	Cocoa Expos	21	(3)

Managerial career
- 1996–1998: Balestier Khalsa
- 1998–2002: Melbourne Central Catholic Hustlers
- 2002: Balestier Khalsa
- 2003–2005: Melbourne Central Catholic Hustlers
- 2006–: Florida Tech Panthers
- * Club domestic league appearances and goals

Robin Chan is a Malaysian retired footballer who coaches the Florida Institute of Technology men's soccer team. He played professionally in the USISL.

== Player ==
Although born in Malaysia, Chan grew up in Walton-on-Thames in England. In 1987, he moved to the United States and entered the Florida Institute of Technology where he played on the men's soccer team from 1987 to 1990. In 1988, the Panthers won the NCAA Men's Division II Soccer Championship while Chan was named the tournament Offensive MPV. Chan was a 1990 Second Team NCAA Division II All American. He graduated with a bachelor's degree in 1991. and is a member of the Florida Tech Athletic Hall of Fame. In 2008, Chan was inducted into the Sunshine State Conference Hall of Fame.

== Professional ==
In 1992, he signed with the Orlando Lions of the USISL. He was a 1992 First Team USISL All Star. In 1994, he signed with the Cocoa Expos. In 1997, he played for the Carolina Dynamo of the USISL A-League which finished runner-up in the championship game. In 1998, he returned to Florida to join the Orlando Nighthawks. He returned to the Expos by at least 2003 and played through the 2005 season.

== Coach ==
Chan began his coaching career with the Melbourne Central Catholic High School where he took the boys' team to the 1998 and 2003 State championships. In 2006, he became the head coach of the Florida Tech men's team.
