= Chris McDonald (soccer) =

American soccer player

Personal information
- Place of birth: Sacramento, California, U.S.
- Height: 5 ft 8 in (1.73 m)
- Positions: Forward; midfielder

Youth career
- 1993–1996: San Francisco Dons

Senior career*
Years	Team	Apps	(Gls)
1996	San Francisco Bay Seals		(19)
1997	Sacramento Knights (indoor)		
1998	Nashville Metros	22	(5)
1998–2001	Sacramento Knights (indoor)		
2004	San Diego Sockers (indoor)		
2004	Sacramento Knights		
- * Club domestic league appearances and goals

Chris McDonald is an American retired soccer player who spent most of his career in indoor leagues.

== Career ==
In 1993, McDonald graduated from Del Campo High School. He played on both the Del Campo soccer team and with River City Soccer Club. He attended the University of San Francisco where he played on the men's soccer team from 1993 to 1996. During the 1996 off-season, he played for the San Francisco Bay Seals in the USISL.

On February 1, 1997, the San Jose Clash selected him in the third round (twenty-first overall) of the 1997 MLS College Draft. McDonald chose to remain in school and did not sign with the Clash. In June 1997, he signed with the Sacramento Knights of the Continental Indoor Soccer League. He left the team in 1998 to join the Nashville Metros of the USISL. At the end of the outdoor season, McDonald rejoined the Knights as they went to the PSA championship. McDonald remained with the Knights through the 2001 season. In 1999, Sacramento won the World Indoor Soccer League title. The team folded after the 2001 season and the San Diego Sockers selected McDonald in the Dispersal Draft. He did not sign with them and left professional soccer for two years. In January 2004, he joined the Sockers. He finished the season with the Sockers who folded during the off-season. In 2004, McDonald also played for the amateur Sacramento Knights of the Men's Professional Soccer League. In January 2005, the Cleveland Force selected McDonald with the eighth selection of the MISL Dispersal Draft.
