= Pasi Kinturi =

Finnish footballer (born 1974)

Personal information
- Date of birth: October 14, 1974 (age 52)
- Place of birth: Helsinki, Finland
- Height: 5 ft 7 in (1.70 m)
- Positions: Forward; midfielder

Youth career
- Malmin Palloseura

College career
| Years | Team | Apps | (Gls) |
| 1994–1998 | Campbell Fighting Camels | 69 | (43) |

Senior career*
| Years | Team | Apps | (Gls) |
| 1994 | Malmin Palloseura | | |
| 1994 | FinnPa | 8 | (0) |
| 1996 | Nashville Metros | ? | (19) |
| 1998 | Malmin Palloseura | | |
| 1999 | Hampton Roads Mariners | 21 | (1) |
| 2000 | Nashville Metros | 26 | (8) |
| 2001 | Malmin Palloseura | 12 | (2) |
| 2003–2006 | Nashville Metros | 29 | (5) |
- * Club domestic league appearances and goals

Pasi Kinturi is a retired Finnish association football player who played professionally in the USL A-League. He was the 1996 USISL Premier League MVP.

Kinturi played for Malmin Palloseura youth team when it won the 1993 Helsinki Cup. In 1994, he played for the Malmin Palloseura in the Kakkonen South Group. He then moved to FinnPa in the Veikkausliiga. That fall, Kinturi moved to the United States to attend Campbell University. He played four seasons with the Campbell Fighting Camels (1994–1996, 1998). He was a 1996 Third Team NCAA All American. In addition to his collegiate career, Kinturi also spent the summer of 1996 with the Nashville Metros in the 1996 USISL Premier League. He was the league's leading scorer and MVP. Then in 1998, he spent the summer with Malmin Palloseura back in Finland. In 1999, Kinturi turned professional with the Hampton Roads Mariners in the USL A-League. Brett Mosen coached the Mariners and when he moved to the Nashville Metros in 2000, he took Kinturi, and several other Mariners players, along with him. In 2001, Kinturi again played for Malmin Palloseura. In 2003, Kinturi signed with the Nashville Metros, now playing in the USL Premier Development League. Kinturi retired in 2006 from professional soccer after the birth of his first child.
