= Keith DeFini =

American soccer player

Personal information
- Place of birth: Lakewood, Ohio, U.S.
- Height: 6 ft 1 in (1.85 m)
- Position: Forward

Youth career
- 1990–1993: Creighton Bluejays

Senior career*
Years	Team	Apps	(Gls)
1994	CCV Hydra		
1994–1995	Kansas City Attack (indoor)	25	(5)
1995	Hampton Roads Mariners		
1995	Greensboro Dynamo	4	(2)
1996	Omaho Flames		
1997	Lincoln Brigade		
1997–1998	Omaho Flames (indoor)		
1998	TKB Omaha		
1999	Charlotte Eagles	5	(0)
- * Club domestic league appearances and goals

Keith DeFini is an American retired soccer midfielder who played professionally in the National Professional Soccer League and USISL.

== Youth ==
Born in Ohio, DeFini grew up in McKinney, Texas. He attended Creighton University, playing on the men's soccer team from 1990 to 1993. He was a 1993 First Team All American.

== Professional ==
In December 1993, the Detroit Rockers of the National Professional Soccer League drafted DeFini in the first round. He never made a first team appearance before returning to the United States. During the summer of 1994, DeFini played for the CCV Hydra in the USISL. On November 15, 1994, the Kansas City Attack traded their 1994 first round draft pick to the Rockers for the rights to DeFini. DeFini immediately signed with the Attack. In May 1995, he moved outdoors with the Hampton Roads Mariners of the USISL. By July, he was playing for the Greensboro Dynamo. He signed with the Kansas City Attack for the 1995-1996 indoor season, but on November 30, 1995, the Attack traded him to the Canton Invaders for future considerations. In 1996, he played outdoors for the Omaha Flames. In 1997, he played for Lincoln Brigade. In the fall of 1997, DeFini rejoined the Omaha Flames for the USISL indoor season. He spent the 1998 outdoor season playing for Omaha TKB in the Senior Men's Division of the Cornhusker State Games. He finished his career in 1999 with the Charlotte Eagles.
