= Keiran Breslin =

American soccer player

Personal information
- Position: Midfielder

Youth career
- 1990–1993: Florida Tech Panthers

Senior career*
Years	Team	Apps	(Gls)
1994–1995	Cocoa Expos		
1995–1996	Cocoa Expos (indoor)		
1996–1997	Carolina Dynamo		
1999–2000	Carolina Dynamo	25	(3)
- * Club domestic league appearances and goals

Keiran Breslin is a retired soccer midfielder who played professionally in the North American A-League.

Breslin attended the Florida Institute of Technology where he was part of the 1991 NCAA Division II Men's Soccer Championship. He finished his bachelor's degree in 1994, but remained at Florida Tech to complete his master's degree in 1996. While he worked on his degree, Breslin played for the Cocoa Expos in the USISL beginning in 1994. During the 1995-1996 USISL indoor season, Breslin scored fifteen goals. In 1996, he moved to the Carolina Dynamo in the A-League where he played two seasons. He returned to the Dynamo in 1999 for another two seasons.
