= Joe Munoz =

American soccer player and coach

Personal information
- Full name: Joseph Muñoz
- Date of birth: March 16, 1976 (age 50)
- Place of birth: Chula Vista, California, U.S.
- Height: 5 ft 10 in (1.78 m)
- Positions: Forward; midfielder

College career
Years	Team	Apps	(Gls)
1994–1997	Cal State Bakersfield Roadrunners		

Senior career*
Years	Team	Apps	(Gls)
1996–1997	Central Coast Roadrunners		
1998	MetroStars	1	(0)
1998	→ Long Island Rough Riders (loan)	2	(0)
1998–2006	Chico Rooks		

Managerial career
- 2011: Mendocino College (assistant)
- * Club domestic league appearances and goals

Joe Munoz is an American retired soccer forward who played professionally in Major League Soccer and the USISL. He was the 1997 PDSL Playoff MVP.

== Youth ==
Munoz attended California State University, Bakersfield where he played on the men's soccer team from 1994 to 1997. In 1997, Bakersfield won the NCAA Division II Men's Soccer Championship. Munoz was a 1996 Division II Second Team and 1997 Division II First Team All American as well as the 1997 NCAA Division II Player of the Year.

== Professional ==
In 1996 and 1997, Munoz played for the Central Coast Roadrunners of the PDSL. In 1997, the Roadrunners won the league title and Munoz was named the playoff MVP. On February 1, 1998, the MetroStars selected Munoz in the second round (fifteenth overall) of the 1998 MLS College Draft. In May, the MetroStars sent him on loan to the Long Island Rough Riders of the USL A-League. He played one game for the MetroStars before being released in June 1998. He then played for the Chico Rooks from 1998 to 2006.

== Coach ==
Munoz has a doctorate in physical therapy from Loma Linda University and is an assistant coach with the Mendocino College women's soccer team.
