= Bryan Taylor (soccer) =

American soccer player (born 1975)

Personal information
- Date of birth: July 23, 1975 (age 51)
- Place of birth: Hanford, California, United States
- Height: 6 ft 0 in (1.83 m)
- Positions: Forward; midfielder

Youth career
- 1994–1995: Fresno State Bulldogs

Senior career*
Years	Team	Apps	(Gls)
1996	Central Coast Roadrunners		
1997	Los Angeles Galaxy	11	(1)
1998	Miami Fusion	6	(0)
1998	Charleston Battery	11	(0)
1999	San Francisco Bay Seals	6	(1)
2001	Stanislaus United Cruisers	7	(0)
- * Club domestic league appearances and goals

Bryan Taylor (frequently spelled Brian Taylor, born July 23, 1975) is a retired American soccer midfielder who played professionally in the USISL and Major League Soccer.

== Youth ==
Taylor played collegiate soccer at Fresno State in 1994 and 1995.

== Professional ==
In 1996, Taylor played for the Central Coast Roadrunners. He scored five of the team's six playoff goals. On February 2, 1997, the Los Angeles Galaxy selected Taylor in the first round (ninth overall) of the 1997 MLS Supplemental Draft. On November 6, 1997, the Miami Fusion selected Taylor with the 24th selection of the 1997 MLS Expansion Draft. He played six games for the Fusion before being waived on June 1, 1998, in order to make room on the roster for Matt Knowles. He then joined the Charleston Battery for the rest of the season.
