= Norman Piper =

English footballer (born 1948)

Personal information
- Full name: Norman John Piper
- Date of birth: 8 January 1948 (age 78)
- Place of birth: North Tawton, England
- Position: Midfielder

Youth career
- 1964–65: Plymouth Argyle

Senior career*
Years	Team	Apps	(Gls)
1965–1970	Plymouth Argyle	215	(35)
1970–1978	Portsmouth	313	(51)
1975	→ Lusitano (loan)	7	(1)
1977–1978	Fort Lauderdale Strikers	41	(7)
1978–1979	Yeovil Town	?	(?)
1979–1980	Columbus Magic	?	(?)
1979–1982	Wichita Wings (indoor)	182	(98)
1982–1983	Pittsburgh Spirit (indoor)		

International career
1970–1971	England U23	4	(0)

Managerial career
- 1985–1988: Wichita Wings (assistant)
- 1989–1990: Wichita Blue
- * Club domestic league appearances and goals

Norman Piper (born 8 January 1948) is an English former professional footballer who played in England for 13 years before finishing his career in the United States.

== Playing career ==
Born in North Tawton, Devon on 8 January 1948 he joined Plymouth Argyle as an apprentice and signed professional terms in February 1965. Already an England Youth international, Piper made his debut for the Under 23 side in 1970 against Bulgaria, the year he left The Pilgrims- for whom he scored 35 goals in 221 appearances. That summer Piper had signed for Portsmouth, becoming their record signing at £50,000. Piper served Pompey with great distinction during the clubs increasingly tenuous hold on Division Two status, but eventually lost form after relegation to the third. He was dropped in February 1978, being replaced by his namesake Steve Piper. His contract, along with that of Bobby Stokes was terminated the following month.

Soon after his departure from Portsmouth, a move to the Fort Lauderdale Strikers followed. In 1979, Piper was the first player signed by the expansion Wichita Wings of Major Indoor Soccer League. He played for the Wings until 1982 when he was sent to the Pittsburgh Spirit.

== Coaching career ==
Following his retirement from playing, he became and assistant coach with the Wichita Wings. He was fired on 30 January 1988. In 1989, he was hired to coach the Wichita Blue in the Heartland Soccer League. In 1990, the Blue moved to the Lone Star Soccer Alliance. He was fired mid-season. He coached the men's soccer team at Bethel College (Kansas) from 1988 to 1990. He now is a coach for a small travel soccer team in Southern California known as TVSA Hawks

== Style of play ==
Piper was one of that generation who bridged the gap between terminological eras, beginning his career as a wing half and ending it as a midfielder despite playing a similar role throughout.
