= Ezell Park =

Urban park in Nashville, Tennessee

Coordinates: 36.087662°N 86.677414°W

- Interactive map of Ezell Park
- Type: Urban park
- Location: Nashville, Tennessee
- Operator: Nashville Board of Parks and Recreation

Ezell Park is an urban park in southeastern Nashville, Tennessee. The park is home to a soccer complex formerly used by the Nashville Metros of the USL PDL, and is run by the Nashville Board of Parks and Recreation. The park is adjacent to a correctional facility which is, as of 2018, being used as the Davidson County Jail.
