= Chris Ramsey (footballer) =

English footballer (born 1962)

Chris Ramsey MBE
Personal information
- Full name: Christopher Leroy Ramsey
- Date of birth: 28 April 1962 (age 64)
- Place of birth: Bristol, England
- Height: 5 ft 9 in (1.75 m)
- Position: Right back

Team information
- Current team: Queens Park Rangers (Technical Director)

Youth career
- 1978–1980: Bristol City

Senior career*
Years	Team	Apps	(Gls)
1980–1984	Brighton & Hove Albion	30	(0)
1984–1987	Swindon Town	100	(5)
1987–1988	Southend United	13	(0)
1988–1991	Naxxar Lions		
1991–1992	Cocoa Expos		
Total		143	(5)

Managerial career
- 1998–2000: England U20
- 2001–2004: Charleston Battery
- 2015: Queens Park Rangers
- * Club domestic league appearances and goals

Christopher Leroy Ramsey MBE (born 28 April 1962) is a former professional footballer who is The Football Association's Professional Development Phase (PDP) Lead across England teams. He played as a defender, most often as a right back, for Bristol City, Brighton & Hove Albion, Swindon Town, Southend United, Naxxar Lions and Cocoa Expos. Ramsey coached for Tottenham Hotspur working with their academy and was appointed as first team coach where he assisted Tim Sherwood and Les Ferdinand. He was placed in temporary charge of Queens Park Rangers, in February 2015 following the resignation of manager, Harry Redknapp. After being temporary coach of Queens Park Rangers and following their relegation to the Championship, Ramsey was named head coach on a permanent basis in May 2015. He is nicknamed "Rambo".

He was appointed Member of the Order of the British Empire (MBE) in the 2019 Birthday Honours for services to football and diversity in sport.

The London Football Awards 2025 announced that Ramsey is set to be awarded the Outstanding Contribution to London Football Award.

== Playing career ==
He began his career as an apprentice at Bristol City before moving on to Brighton and Hove Albion. He played for Brighton in the 1983 FA Cup Final against Manchester United. With Brighton leading, Ramsey was injured by a bad tackle from Norman Whiteside, and was still hobbling as Frank Stapleton got ahead of him to equalise for United. Moments later, Ramsey received further treatment for his injury and was promptly substituted. After a drawn final at Wembley, Ramsey missed the replay due to the injury and Brighton lost 4–0.

Ramsey went on loan to Swindon Town from Brighton on 30 August 1984, who were then under the management of Lou Macari. He signed on a permanent contract on 13 December 1984 and stayed at Swindon for three years until joining Southend United on 14 August 1987. Whilst at Swindon he won a Fourth Division championship medal in the 85–86 Swindon team, playing 43 of the 46 league games. He also played 25 games the following season when Swindon won back-to-back promotions by beating Gillingham in the Third Division play-off final replay at Selhurst Park on 29 May 1987.

== Coaching career ==
Ramsey was also a player-coach for the Naxxar Lions in the Maltese Premier League, and in the United States was a player, assistant coach and coach for the USL PDL team Cocoa Expos.

In 1998 Ramsey began working for the Football Association (FA), holding the position of Regional Director of Coaching. While working for the FA he served as the head coach of the England national under-20 football team. During his tenure as the U-20 coach, Ramsey guided the team to the 1999 FIFA World Youth Championship in Nigeria. He was also the assistant coach of the England national under-16 football team at the 2000 UEFA European Under-16 Football Championship in Israel. In addition to his coaching responsibilities while at the FA, Ramsey was a scout for the England national football team under Kevin Keegan. After leaving the FA Ramsey was the assistant coach at Luton Town until November 2000. Ramsey holds a UEFA coaching licence and a FA Coach Education Diploma.

From 2001 to 2004 he managed American club Charleston Battery, during which time the club won the 2003 USL A-League championship. After leaving Charleston in 2004, Ramsey worked as Head of Player Development with the Tottenham Hotspur F.C. Reserves and Academy. In 2008, he was listed amongst the 30 most influential black people in football by The Voice, a newspaper for the black community.

Ramsey left Tottenham Hotspur on 19 June 2014, following ten years of service to the club.

In August 2014, he was appointed as assistant manager of the England U17 national team.

=== Queens Park Rangers ===
On 1 November 2014, he was appointed Head of Player Development and Academy Manager at Queens Park Rangers. Following the resignation of manager Harry Redknapp on 3 February 2015, Ramsey was placed in temporary charge, first with Les Ferdinand and Kevin Bond, then solely with Bond. Ramsey's first competitive match as QPR head coach was on 7 February, losing to a 92nd minute, added-time winner, a 1–0 defeat to Southampton at Loftus Road. His first Premier League win came three days later, on 10 February, a 0–2 victory against Sunderland at the Stadium of Light, in QPR's first away victory and first away points of the season. On 12 February, Ramsey was given the job until the end of the 2014–15 season. On 10 May, QPR were relegated to the Championship, after a 6–0 away defeat to Manchester City. He was appointed head coach on a permanent basis on 19 May, signing a three-year contract. On 4 November, he was sacked as QPR head coach, with the club in thirteenth place in the league. On 5 January 2016, Ramsey returned to QPR to become technical director.

== The Football Association ==
On 13 August 2025, it was confirmed that Ramsey had returned to The Football Association as Professional Development Phase (PDP) Lead across England's U17 to U20 squads.

== Career statistics ==
=== Player ===
Appearances and goals by club, season and competition
Club	Season	League			Play-offs		FA Cup		League Cup		Other		Total	
Club	Season	Division	Apps	Goals	Apps	Goals	Apps	Goals	Apps	Goals	Apps	Goals	Apps	Goals
Swindon Town	1984–85	Fourth Division	32	1	0	0	0	0	0	0	2 (Note: Appearance in Football League Trophy)	0	34	1
Swindon Town	1985–86	Fourth Division	43	3	0	0	2	1	6	0	2	0	53	4
Swindon Town	1986–87	Third Division	25	1	0	0	3	0	4	0	3	0	35	1
Swindon Town	Total		100	5	0	0	5	1	10	0	7	0	122	6
Career total			100	5	0	0	5	1	10	0	7	0	122	6

=== Manager ===
As of 3 November 2015

Team	Nat	From	To	Record				
Team	Nat	From	To	G	W	D	L	Win %
Queens Park Rangers	(England)	2 February 2015	4 November 2015	32	9	6	17	28.13%
Total				32	9	6	17	28.13%

== Honours ==
=== Player ===
Brighton & Hove Albion

- FA Cup runner-up: 1982–83

Swindon Town

- Football League Fourth Division: 1985–86

=== Manager ===
Charleston Battery

- A-League Championship: 2003
