= Dwyane Demmin =

Trinidadian footballer (born 1975)

Personal information
- Full name: Dwyane Damine Andante Walden Lama Dama Jana Demmin
- Date of birth: January 5, 1975 (age 51)
- Place of birth: Arima, Trinidad and Tobago
- Height: 6 ft 5 in (1.96 m)
- Position: Defender

College career
Years	Team	Apps	(Gls)
1993–1996	Belhaven Blazers		

Senior career*
Years	Team	Apps	(Gls)
1996	Jackson Chargers		
1998–1999	Michigan Bucks	7	(5)
2001	Indiana Blast	20	(1)
2002–2003	Charlotte Eagles		
2007–2009	Mississippi Brilla	44	(7)

International career
	Trinidad and Tobago	5	(0)
- * Club domestic league appearances and goals

Dwyane Demmin (born January 5, 1975) is a Trinidadian former footballer who played as a defender. He earned five caps with the Trinidad and Tobago national team.

== Club career ==
=== Youth ===
Demmin, the younger brother of Craig Demmin, came to the United States in 1993 to attend Belhaven University. He spent four years on the Belhaven soccer team and was a 1994 Second Team NAIA All American. In 1996, he was the NAIA Player of the year and was inducted into the Belhaven Hall of Fame in 2006.

=== Senior ===
In 1996, Demmin played as an amateur for the Jackson Chargers in the USISL Premier League. He was the 1996 USISL Premier League Defender of the Year. In 1998 and 1999, he played for the Michigan Bucks in the USL Premier Development League. In 2001, Demmin became a full professional with the Indiana Blast in the USL A-League. In 2002, he joined the Charlotte Eagles for two seasons. In 2007, Demmin joined the Mississippi Brilla of the USL Premier Development League. He was All League that season.

== International career ==
Demmin earned five caps with the Trinidad and Tobago national team.
