= Aaron Leventhal =

American soccer player

Personal information
- Date of birth: July 18, 1974 (age 52)
- Place of birth: United States
- Height: 5 ft 11 in (1.80 m)
- Positions: Defender; midfielder

College career
Years	Team	Apps	(Gls)
1992–1995	Drake Bulldogs		

Senior career*
Years	Team	Apps	(Gls)
1994–1995	Des Moines Menace	15	(10)
1996–2002	Minnesota Thunder	99	(3)

Managerial career
- 2006: Minnesota Thunder (assistant)
- * Club domestic league appearances and goals

Aaron Leventhal (born July 18, 1974) is an American retired soccer player who played professionally in the USL A-League.

Leventhal attended Drake University, playing on the men's soccer team from 1992 to 1995. He is within the top ten of all Drake offensive records. In 1995, Leventhal played for the Des Moines Menace in the USISL Premier League. He led the team in scoring as it went to the Sizzlin’ Four Tournament. In 1996, Leventhal turned professional with the Minnesota Thunder of the 1996 USISL Select League. In 1997, the Thunder moved to the USISL A-League. In 1999, they won the A-League championship. Leventhal retired after playing one game at the beginning of the 2002 season.

In May 2006, Levanthal became the strength and conditioning coach for the Minnesota Thunder. He is part of Team Gilboa, an Alpine ski club. He was American Alpine skier Kristina Koznick’s strength and condition coach.
