= Paul Lekics =

American soccer player and coach

Personal information
- Date of birth: March 5, 1974 (age 52)
- Place of birth: Crystal Lake, Illinois, U.S.
- Height: 5 ft 9 in (1.75 m)
- Position: Midfielder

College career
Years	Team	Apps	(Gls)
1992–1996	Creighton Bluejays		

Senior career*
Years	Team	Apps	(Gls)
1997–2004	Richmond Kickers	175	(19)

Managerial career
- 2009–2010: Cal State Stanislaus Warriors (assistant)
- * Club domestic league appearances and goals

Paul Lekics is an American retired soccer midfielder who spent eight seasons with the Richmond Kickers.

== Youth ==
Lekics graduated from Crystal Lake South High School where he was a 1991 Third Team High School All American soccer player. He attended the Creighton University, playing on the men's soccer team from 1992 to 1996. He graduated with a bachelor's degree in marketing.

== Professional ==
In December 1995, the Atlanta Ruckus selected Lekics in the A-League draft, but he chose to remain in school for one more season. In 1997, Lekics turned professional with the Richmond Kickers of the USISL A-League. On February 1, 1998, the Chicago Fire selected Lekics in the third round (twenty-fifth overall) of the 1998 MLS College Draft. On March 2, 1998, the Fire waived Lekics in a pre-season roster reduction. He returned to the Kickers and played for them until his retirement in 2004.

In 2009, Lekics became an assistant coach with the California State University, Stanislaus men's soccer team. In June 2011, it was announced that Lekics had stepped down to return to the Midwest, accepting a position with FCX Soccer Club in Barrington, Illinois.
