= Puget Sound Gunners FC =

Former American soccer club

- Full name: Puget Sound Gunners Football Club
- Nickname: Gunners
- Founded: 2010 (as North Sound SeaWolves)
- Dissolved: 2015
- Ground: Issaquah High School; Issaquah, Washington
- Capacity: 2,500
- Owner: Alex Silva
- Head Coach: Alex Silva
- League: Premier Development League
- Website: http://www.pugetsoundgunnersfc.com
Home colors	Away colors

Puget Sound Gunners FC was an American soccer team based in Issaquah, Washington, United States. Founded in 2010, the team played in the Premier Development League (PDL), the fourth tier of the American Soccer Pyramid, from 2011 to 2015.

In 2012, the team played its home games at Edmonds Stadium, but moved to Issaquah High School Stadium for the 2014 season. The team's colors were light blue and white.

== History ==
North Sound SeaWolves was announced as a USL Premier Development League expansion franchise on November 29, 2010. The team is, essentially, a replacement for the Yakima Reds franchise, which folded at the end of the 2010 season after over a decade in the league, and which was also owned by SeaWolves owner Alex Silva.

The team announced on February 23, 2011, that they had signed former English Premier League player Adam Nowland as player-coach for the SeaWolves' inaugural season. Nowland will serve as assistant coach to head coach Alex Silva as well as be a field player for the squad.

The club signed long-time Seattle Sounders (USL) player Craig Tomlinson on 18 March 2011.

The SeaWolves played their first competitive game on May 7, 2011, a 0–0 tie with the Washington Crossfire.

On January 16, 2013, the club rebranded as Puget Sound Gunners FC after partnering with the Issaquah Soccer Club.

On January 29, 2016, the Gunners PDL franchise rights were sold to the Victoria Highlanders so they could rejoin the PDL.

== Players ==
=== Current roster ===
Current

Roster as of 2015:

Note: Flags indicate national team as defined under FIFA eligibility rules; some limited exceptions apply. Players may hold more than one non-FIFA nationality.

No.	Pos.	Nation	Player
0	GK	USA	Evan Gaul
1	GK	ROU	Claudio Lazar
2	DF	CAN	Christian Strangis
3	DF	USA	Zane Meehen
4	DF	USA	Gene Tibbetts
5	MF	USA	Renato Bandiera
6	FW	USA	Jesse Klug
7	MF	USA	Junpei Tsuji
8	MF	CAN	Mark Conrad
9	FW	USA	Robin Casillas
10	DF	TRI	Nasyir Rodriguez
11	MF	USA	Brady Ballew
13	MF	USA	Joshua Hamilton

No.	Pos.	Nation	Player
14	DF	USA	Kevin Cook
15	DF	GAM	Buba Jammeh
16	MF	USA	Jordan Correa
17	FW	ETH	Abdul Aman
18	DF	USA	Ryan Blair
19	MF	USA	Josh Otusanya
20	DF	USA	Devin Thomas
21	MF	USA	Marshall Kosaka
23	MF	USA	Andrew Hill
24	FW	USA	Tody Tolo
25	MF	USA	Giancarlo Santoro
—	MF	USA	David Hill
10	MF	SLV	Edgardo Mira

== Year-by-year ==
Year	Division	League	Regular season	Playoffs	Open Cup
2011	4	USL PDL	6th, Northwest	Did not qualify	Did not qualify
2012	4	USL PDL	7th, Northwest	Did not qualify	Did not qualify
2013	4	USL PDL	7th, Northwest	Did not qualify	Did not qualify
2014	4	USL PDL	7th, Northwest	Did not qualify	Did not qualify
2015	4	USL PDL	7th, Northwest	Did not qualify	Did not qualify

Click on year for team's season wiki.

== Head coaches ==
- (Brazil) Alex Silva (2011–present)

== Stadium ==
- Goddard Memorial Stadium; Everett, Washington (2011)
- Edmonds Stadium; Edmonds, Washington (2012–2013)
- Issaquah High School; Issaquah, Washington (2014–Current)

== Average attendance ==
Attendance stats are calculated by averaging each team's self-reported home attendances from the historical match archives here and here.

- 2011: 182
- 2012: 135
- 2013: 234
- 2014: 133
