= Toni Siikala =

Finnish footballer (born 1971)

Personal information
- Date of birth: April 28, 1971 (age 55)
- Place of birth: Seinajoki, Finland
- Height: 6 ft 1 in (1.85 m)
- Position: Striker

Youth career
- 1977–1989: Sepsi-78

College career
Years	Team	Apps	(Gls)
1992–1995	Campbell Fighting Camels	60	(68)

Senior career*
Years	Team	Apps	(Gls)
1990–1992	TP-Seinäjoki	28	(7)
1993	Raleigh Flyers	16	(10)
1995–1996	Nashville Metros	33	(28)
1997	Raleigh Flyers	24	(9)
1997–1998	St. Louis Ambush (indoor)	5	(1)
1998	Charleston Battery	22	(8)
1999	Hampton Roads Mariners	19	(4)

Managerial career
- 1998–1999: Charleston Southern University (assistant)
- * Club domestic league appearances and goals

Toni Siikala is a retired Finnish football (soccer) forward who played in both the United States and Finland. He played professionally in the USISL and National Professional Soccer League.

Siikala played his first career season at men's level in 1989 with Sepsi-78 in Finland. In 1990–92, Siikala played for TP-Seinäjoki still in Finland. He moved to the United States in the fall of 1992 and entered Campbell University where he was a 1993 Second Team and 1995 First Team All American soccer player. He was one of 12 M.A.C. Hermann Trophy nominees as the top college player in the nation in 1995. Siikala scored 68 goals and added 21 assists in his 60-game collegiate career despite losing significant number of games to injuries in 1992 and 1994. He graduated with a degree in mathematics in 1996. In 2010, Campbell University inducted Siikala into its Athletic Hall of Fame.

During the 1993 collegiate offseason, he played for the Raleigh Flyers of the USISL. In 1995 and 1996, he played for the Nashville Metros. In 1997, he returned to the Flyers for one season. On October 16, 1997, the St. Louis Ambush of the National Professional Soccer League signed Siikala. He played only five games before being injured and released in February 1998. On March 3, 1998, the Charleston Battery signed Siikala. He finished his career in the United States in 1999 with the Hampton Roads Mariners of the USL A-League.

In 1998 and 1999, Siikala served as an assistant coach with Charleston Southern University while attending the school to earn a master's degree.
