= Larry Smyth =

American journalist

- Born: January 17, 1902; Portland, Oregon, US
- Died: November 22, 1960 (aged 58)
- Spouse: Marie Mongrain (m. 1938)

Larry Smyth (January 17, 1902 – November 22, 1960) was an American journalist and public official. He worked for The Oregon Journal from 1922 to 1953, becoming the political director in 1947 and briefly leaving to work for Secretary of the Interior Douglas McKay as information director in 1953. He returned to The Oregon Journal in 1955, dying in 1960 from esophageal cancer.

== Career ==
=== The Oregon Journal (1922–1953) ===
Smyth began working for The Oregon Journal in November 1922. Before that, he worked at The Oregonian and the Portland News, starting at the age of 16. He covered every session of the Oregon Legislative Assembly from 1931 until he left the newspaper in 1953. In 1947, he was chosen to become the new political director at the Oregon Journal, replacing Ralph Watson.

In March 1948, Smyth wrote into local Oregon newspaper The Bend Bulletin to secure their opinion on his proposal to install floodlights in the shrubs at the lawn of the Capitol building in Salem, Oregon. Smyth said he was asking "just as Larry Smyth, citizen, who admires the building and would like to see the most of it". The Bend Bulletin, however, identified him as the political editor and lightheartedly approved of the idea, commenting that it would "draw visitors to it [the Capitol] and further advertise its beauty". A new lighting system would begin installation in 1964, after Smyth's death.

Smyth was responsible for organizing the Dewey–Stassen debate in the 1948 Republican Party presidential primaries between Thomas E. Dewey and Harold Stassen, which had major national impact. In May 1948, while the winner of the primary process was being decided, Smyth commented to the Idaho Statesman that the winner would be the one who had gained the most ground in the last few days, given how close the election was.

In March 1951, Smyth was praised by the Bend Bulletin for a story in which he revealed which roads would be improved by state government highway spending, a specification the highway commission refused to disclose.

In September 1951, Smyth was asked to participate in a poll of Oregonian news writers that asked them to choose which members of the Oregon State Senate they thought were the best. Smyth, having been pitched the idea by Oregon Senator Richard L. Neuberger, refused to partake in the poll, reasoning that it would counter his objective to interest well-meaning citizens in the political arena while simultaneously criticizing politicians he disagreed with in good faith. His decision was praised by the Bend Bulletin.

In February 1953, Smyth announced that he was leaving the Oregon Journal to work as information chief for Douglas McKay, a former governor of Oregon and then United States Secretary of the Interior. He had previously turned down the job twice. His salary was US$12,000 annually (US$141,030 in today's money). Smyth gave a speech in both houses of the Oregon Legislative Assembly while it was in session, which was unprecedented by any other outsider in living memory. Other non-legislators had spoken on the floor before, but never when the legislature was in session. The Speaker of the Oregon House of Representatives, Eugene E. Marsh, explained that it was permitted because "he's really been one of us for these many years". Both houses also passed resolutions congratulating Smyth, he was gifted a leather briefcase by Representative Orval Eaton on the floor of the House, and members of the press corps gave a dinner in his honor.

=== Department of the Interior (1953–1955) ===
Smyth served as Douglas McKay's information director and assistant until 1955. When McKay died in 1959, Smyth wrote a column paying tribute, commenting that "Life around Douglas McKay was never dull ... He was news wherever he was and whatever he did".

=== The Oregon Journal (1955–1960) ===
Smyth announced his resignation, effective May 1, in 1955, which was accepted by McKay with "keen regret". Smyth returned to the Oregon Journal, claiming his old post as political director until his death in 1960. Throughout Smyth's tenure at the Oregon Journal, where he covered many presidential campaigns, he was often asked who he thought would win the elections he wrote about. He invariably replied "the man who gets the most votes".

== Personal life ==
Larry Smyth was born in Portland, Oregon, on January 17, 1902, to Mary M. and Patrick J. Smyth. He graduated from Lincoln High School. Smyth became engaged to Marie Mongrain, described as "a popular member of Portland's younger set", in August 1937; they would get married in April 1938. Mary Smyth died on November 7, 1950, with Patrick dying at some point before then. Smyth had at least four siblings.

In April 1960, Smyth contracted esophageal cancer and underwent surgery. His condition improved after the surgery, with then President-elect John F. Kennedy sending Smyth a telegram wishing well, although his wife Marie said that he was too ill to receive it. Smyth returned to work for a few months before dying on November 22, 1960. His death was met with tributes from newspapers and public officials. The Statesman Journal said that Smyth was "more than a familiar figure—he was well-liked as a person and trusted as a reporter". A February 1961 resolution in the Oregon State Senate expressed sadness over Smyth's death and praised his tenure as a "skillful, fair, and impartial interpreter of the work of this legislature".

Smyth was also skilled in the area of equestrianism, riding a horse at the night show of the Oregon State Fair. He attended a local horseback riding school.
