= William Dugger =

American politician

William Dugger was a state senator in Arkansas. A Republican, he served in the Arkansas Senate in 1871. He represented the Third District.
