= Seattle BigFoot =

Defunct American soccer club

The Seattle BigFoot were an American soccer team based in Seattle, Washington. They were founded in 1995 as the Everett BigFoot and played in the USISL Pro League with home matches at Everett Memorial Stadium. They merged with the Puget Sound Hammers of the USISL Premier League to become the Puget Sound BigFoot who played in the USISL PDSL during the 1997 season at West Seattle Stadium. The Hammers were previously based in the southern Puget Sound region and played home matches in 1995 at high school stadiums in Sumner, Tacoma, and on Vashon Island. They played in 1996 at Peninsula High School in Gig Harbor with a roster of players from local colleges.

The team moved to Seattle for their final season; in February 1999, owner Bill Hurme announced that the team would be renamed to the Seattle Sounders Select as part of an affiliation with the Seattle Sounders of the A-League, who had already used them as an unofficial development squad in the past.

== Year-by-year results ==
Everett BigFoot logo

Year	Division	League	Reg. season	Playoffs	Open Cup
Everett BigFoot (1995–1996)
1995	3	USISL Pro League	3rd, Northwest	1st Round	1st Round
1996	3	USISL Pro League	1st, Western	Conference Finals	Did not qualify
Puget Sound Hammers (1995–1996)
1995	"4"	USISL Premier League	5th, Western	Did not qualify	Did not qualify
1996	"4"	USISL Premier League	3rd, Western Northern	Division Semifinals	Did not qualify
Puget Sound/Seattle BigFoot (1997–1998)
1997	"4"	USISL PDSL	5th, Northwest	Did not qualify	Did not qualify
1998	"4"	USISL PDSL	3rd, Northwest	Did not qualify	Did not qualify
