= Los Angeles Highlanders FC =

- Full name: Los Angeles Highlanders FC
- Nickname: The Highlanders
- Founded: 1997
- Ground: Glendale Sports Complex; Glendale, California
- Capacity: 10,000
- Chairman: Misak Tebelekian
- Manager: Philip Hacopians
- League: United Premier Soccer League

Los Angeles Highlanders FC are an American soccer team. They play their home games at Moyse Stadium on the grounds of Glendale High School in the city of Glendale, California.

== History ==
The Highlanders were founded in 1997 by a group of Armenian American businessmen and soccer fans as a competitive branch of the locally based Ararat Soccer Club, to compete in the nationwide amateur soccer league, the USL Premier Development League. The club rose to the pinnacle of the league quickly, becoming playoff champions in only their second season in 1998, having defeated the previously unbeaten Jackson Chargers 3–2 in the PDL Championship game and ensuring a Southwest Division champion for the third straight season.

Following the 2001 season the team ceased operations.

After a 15-year absence the club announced their return in January 2017 joining the United Premier Soccer League.

== Season-by-season ==
Year	League	W-L-T	Reg. season	Playoffs	Open Cup
1997	USL PDSL	12–4	1st, Southwest	Third	Did not qualify
1998	USL PDSL	11–5	2nd, Southwest	Champions	First Round
1999	USL PDL	13–3	4th, Southwest	Did not qualify	Did not qualify
2000	USL PDL	4–14–0	4th, Southwest	Did not qualify	First Round
2001	USL PDL	1–17–2	5th, Southwest	Did not qualify	Did not qualify
