= Gabe Jones (soccer) =

American soccer player

Personal information
- Full name: Gabriel Jones
- Date of birth: January 21, 1973 (age 53)
- Place of birth: Georgetown, Texas, U.S.
- Height: 5 ft 8 in (1.73 m)
- Positions: Forward; midfielder

Youth career
- 1991–1994: St. Edward's University

Senior career*
Years	Team	Apps	(Gls)
1995–1999	Austin Lone Stars		
1997	Dallas Burn	1	(0)
1997	→ New Orleans Riverboat Gamblers (loan)	5	(0)
2004	Austin Lightning		
- * Club domestic league appearances and goals

Gabe Jones is an American retired soccer player who was the 1995 USISL MVP and leading scorer. He played one game for the Dallas Burn of Major League Soccer.

== Youth ==
In 1991, Jones graduated from Georgetown High School. He attended St. Edward's University where he was an NAIA All American soccer player. He graduated in 1995 with a bachelor's degree in international studies. In 2002, St. Edward's University inducted Jones into its Athletic Hall of Fame.

== Professional ==
In 1995, Jones played for the Austin Lone Stars in the USISL. He was the 1995 USISL MVP while leading the league in scoring. He was the second leading scorer in the 1997 U.S. Open Cup. That year, he also played one game for the Dallas Burn of Major League Soccer. In 1998, Jones led the USISL D3 Pro League with assists and was named First Team All League. On February 6, 1999, the Dallas Burn selected Jones in the second round (eighteenth overall) of the 1999 MLS Supplemental Draft. The Burn released him on April 2, 1999. He then returned to the Lone Stars for the remainder of the season. In 2004, Jones played for the Austin Lightning.
