= Omaha Flames =

- Full name: Omaha Flames Soccer Clubs
- Nickname: Flames
- Founded: 1996
- Ground: Aksarben
- Capacity: 23,145
- League: Premier Development League
- 1997: Unknown
Home colours	Away colours

The Omaha Flames were a PDL franchise that played from 1996 to 1997, folding before the beginning of the 1998 season. They played in Omaha, Nebraska.
