= Jackson Chargers =

- Full name: Jackson Chargers
- Nickname: Chargers
- Founded: 1995
- Dissolved: 1999
- League: USL Premier Development League
- 1999: 1st, Southeast Division; Playoffs: Eastern Finals
Home colors	Away colors

The Jackson Chargers were an American soccer team based in Jackson, Mississippi that played in the PDL (formerly the USISL Premier League) from 1995 to 1999. The team had very successful consecutive seasons in 1998 and 1999, becoming regular season champions in both years and going undefeated, 16–0, in the 1998 season before losing the championship match to Southwest rivals San Gabriel Valley Highlanders. The team dissolved following the 1999 season.

== History ==
The Chargers became a founding member of the newly reorganized fourth tier of the American soccer pyramid, joining the USISL Premier League in its inaugural 1995 season. The league, operated by United Soccer Leagues, would later become the Premier Development Soccer League (PDSL) in 1997 and the Premier Development League (PDL) (the name it is known as today) in the Chargers final active season in 1999.

The Chargers became an annual contender early in league history, claiming the regular season championship and recording a perfect season by winning every regular season match in 1998. They followed this up with a strong performance in 1999, again earning the regular season championship but stumbling in the playoffs.

Following their season in 1999, the team folded.

== Year-by-year ==
Year	Division	League	Reg. season	Playoffs	Open Cup
1995	4	USISL PDL	4th, Eastern Division	Conference Semifinal	Did not qualify
1996	4	USL PDSL	2nd, Northern Division	Conference Finals	Did not qualify
1997	4	USL PDSL	2nd, Mid-South Division	Conference Finals	Did not qualify
1998	4	USL PDSL	1st, Southeast	Final	Did not qualify
1999	4	USL PDL	1st, Southeast	Conference Finals	Did not qualify

== See also ==
- Mississippi Brilla
