= San Diego Top Guns =

The San Diego Top Guns were an American soccer team based in San Diego, California, that competed in the USISL. The team debuted in 1993. The team played its home matches at San Diego Mesa College's football field, which was smaller than a regulation pitch. The Top Guns withdrew from USISL in September 1996 and forfeited their territorial rights.

== Year-by-year ==
Year	Division	League	Reg. season	Playoffs	Open Cup
1994	3	USISL	9th, Southwest	Did not qualify	Did not enter
1995	3	USISL Pro League	2nd, Western South	Divisional Semifinals	Did not qualify
1996	"4"	USISL Premier League	2nd, Western Southern	Divisional Finals	Did not qualify
