= Lexington Bluegrass Bandits =

The Lexington Bluegrass Bandits were an American soccer team that played in Lexington, Kentucky.

They joined the USISL in 1994, and moved to the USISL Pro League in 1995. They were relegated to the USISL Premier League the next year.

== Year-by-year ==
Year	Division	League	Reg. season	Playoffs	Open Cup
1994	3	USISL	4th, Midsouth	Divisional Finals	Did not enter
1995	3	USISL Pro League	4th, Midwest West	Divisional Semifinals	Did not qualify
1996	"4"	USISL Premier League	1st, Central Northern	Division Finals	Did not qualify
1997	"4"	USISL PDSL	3rd, Mid-South	Division Semifinals	Did not qualify
1998	On Hiatus				
1999	"4"	USL PDL	8th, Southeast	Did not qualify	Did not qualify
2000	"4"	USL PDL	6th, Great Lakes	Did not qualify	Did not qualify
