= Tucson Amigos =

Soccer club in Arizona (1989 to 1999)

The Tucson Amigos were a soccer club based in Tucson, Arizona that competed in the SISL, USISL and United Soccer Leagues. The founder of the Tucson Amigos was Dennis Archer, a local business owner who owned the Tucson Amigos Indoor Soccer Center.

== Year-by-year ==
Year	Division	League	Reg. season	Playoffs	Open Cup	Player Honors
1989/90	N/A	SISL Indoor	2nd, Cactus	1st Round	N/A	
1990	N/A	SISL	4th, Western	Semifinals	Did not enter	Rookie of the year: Jose Miranda
1990/91	N/A	SISL Indoor	1st, Southwest	Semifinals	N/A	League top scorer: Albertico Morales
1991	N/A	SISL	4th, Southwest	Did not qualify	Did not enter	
1991/92	N/A	USISL Indoor	1st, Southwest	Sizzling Four	N/A	Coach of the Year: Carlos Acosta
1992	N/A	USISL	3rd, Southwest	Final	Did not enter	League All Stars: Demetri Panayi, John Olu–Molomo, Narciso Zazueta
1992/93	N/A	USISL Indoor	1st, Southwest	Playoffs	N/A	Rookie of the year: Omar Felix
1993	N/A	USISL	5th, Southwest	Did not qualify	Did not enter	
1994	3	USISL	6th, Southwest	Divisional Finals	Did not qualify	
1995	"4"	USISL Premier League	2nd, Western	Divisional 3rd/4th	Did not qualify	
1996	"4"	USISL Premier League	4th, Southern	Division Semifinals	Did not qualify	
1997	"4"	USISL PDSL	3rd, Southwest	Division Finals	Lost in the 1st Round to Austin Lone Stars (D3 Pro)	
1998	On hiatus					
1999	"4"	USL PDL	6th, Southwest	Did not qualify	Did not qualify	

== Coaches ==
=== Indoor ===
- (United States) Ron Fox: 1991
- (United States) Carlos Acosta: 1991–1993

=== Outdoor ===
- (Germany) Wolfgang Weber: 1991–1994, 1996
- (United States) Luis Dabo: 1995
- (England) Chris Hawken: 1997–1999
