= Michigan Madness =

1990s soccer club based in Ann Arbor, Michigan

Michigan Madness were a USISL soccer club based in Ann Arbor, Michigan that played for two seasons. They began operations in 1995 as the Ann Arbor Elite and prior to the 1996 season, became the Madness. Before the 1997 season, the club folded.

Notable Players

Dennis Brose, Forward, 1996

Andy Cosenza, Forward, 1995

Reid Friedrichs, goalkeeper, 1996

Hector Grandchamp, Goalkeeper, 1996

Scott Hauman, Goalkeeper, 1995

David Hebestreit, Midfielder, 1995 and 1996

William Joker, Defender, 1995

David Matovski, Midfielder, 1996

Joe Nora, Forward, 1995

David Nordwall, Defender, 1995

Brian Rosewarne, Defender, 1995

Rob Sirrine, Defender, 1995

Nate Stovall, Midfielder, 1995

Jaman Tripoli, Defender, 1996

John Truskowski, Midfielder, 1995

Matt Tudor, Goalkeeper, 1995

Dominic Vella, Forward, 1995

Wayne Worosz, Defender, 1995

Head Coaches:

Peter Gaglioti, 1995

Henry Klines, 1995

Dominic Scicluna, 1995

Waad Sana, 1996

Ownership:

Wayne Worosz, sr. 1995-1997

Year by Year Record:

1995: 7-12

1996: 9-5-1

Honors:

1995 Michigan Amateur Cup Champions

1996 USISL Premier League Regular Season Division Champions

== See also ==
- USISL
