= Sioux City Breeze =

Defunct American association football club

The Sioux City Breeze were a soccer club based in Sioux City, Iowa. The club began in the USISL and moved to the USISL Premier League in 1995.

The team was announced in late 1993 by local businessman and team president George Tsiobanos.

== Year-by-year ==
Year	Division	League	Reg. season	Playoffs	Open Cup
1994	3	USISL	9th, Midwest	Did not qualify	Did not enter
1995	"4"	USISL Premier League	1st, Central	Divisional Finals	Did not qualify
1996	"4"	USISL Premier League	3rd, Southern	Division Semifinals	Did not qualify
1997	"4"	USISL PDSL	3rd, Central	Division Semifinals	Did not qualify
1998	"4"	USISL PDSL	5th, Central	Division Semifinals	Did not qualify
1999	"4"	USL PDL	2nd, Heartland	Conference Finals	Did not qualify
