= Wichita Blue =

Wichita Blue, known in 1994 as Wichita Blue Angels, was an American soccer club based in Wichita, Kansas. The Blue played in several leagues including the Heartland Soccer League, Lone Star Soccer Alliance and the USISL.

== History ==
In 1988, the Blue, owned by Ahmad Hassan joined the Heartland Soccer League. In 1990, the team switched to the Lone Star Soccer Alliance. In 1991, the Blue added a women's team and played their home games in Cessna Stadium. Following the 1992 season, the LSSA folded. The Blue sat out the 1993 season. In 1994, the team moved to the USISL where they were known as the Wichita Blue Angels. In 1995, the team resumed its original name, the Wichita Blue. The team withdrew from the league following the 1996 USISL season. In 1999, the team returned to the USISL, but after finishing 7th out of 8 teams in the Heartland Division, the team permanently disbanded.

== Year-by-year ==
Year	Division	League	Reg. season	Playoffs	U.S. Open Cup
1989	N/A	HSL		N/A	Did not enter
1990	N/A	LSSA	4th, Northern	Did not qualify	Did not enter
1991	N/A	LSSA	4th, Northern	Did not qualify	Did not enter
1992	N/A	LSSA	4th, Northern	Did not qualify	Did not enter
1993	On hiatus				
1994	4	USISL		Did not qualify	Did not enter
1995	4	USISL		Did not qualify	Did not enter
1996	4	USISL		Did not qualify	Did not enter
1997	On hiatus				
1998	On hiatus				
1999	4	USISL	7th, Heartland	Did not qualify	Did not enter

== Coaches ==
- Norman Piper 1989-1990
- Ahmad Hassan 1990 (interim)
- Doug McArthur 1990
- Omar Gomez 1991
- Dan Olson 1991
- Ahmad Hassan 1992
- Kevin Kewley 1994
- Ahmad Hassan 1995
- Jerry Lakin 1996
- David Voss 1999
