= West Michigan Edge =

- Full name: West Michigan Edge
- Nickname: The Edge
- Founded: 1995
- Dissolved: 2008
- Ground: EK Stadium
- Capacity: 6,000
- Chairman: (United States) Bob Dykstra
- Manager: (United States) Stephen Herdsman
- League: USL Premier Development League
- 2008: 5th, Midwest Division
Home colors	Away colors

West Michigan Edge was an American soccer team based in Grand Rapids, Michigan, United States. Founded in 1995, the team played in the USL Premier Development League (PDL), the fourth tier of the American Soccer Pyramid, until 2008, when the franchise folded and the team left the league.

The team played its home games at EK Stadium on the campus of East Kentwood High School in nearby Kentwood, Michigan. The team's colors were red, white and blue.

The club also fielded a team in the USL's Super-20 League, a league for players 17 to 20 years of age run under the United Soccer Leagues umbrella.

== History ==
The team played as Grand Rapids Explosion from 1995 to 1998, before changing names to West Michigan Explosion prior to the 1999 season, and adopting their final moniker in 2000.

== Year-by-year ==
Year	Division	League	Regular season	Playoffs	Open Cup
1995	4	USISL Premier League	6th, Central	Did not qualify	Did not qualify
1996	4	USISL Premier League	6th, Central Northern	Did not qualify	Did not qualify
1997	4	USISL PDSL	4th, North Central	Division Semifinals	Did not qualify
1998	4	USISL PDSL	7th, Great Lakes	Did not qualify	Did not qualify
1999	4	USL PDL	7th, Great Lakes	Did not qualify	Did not qualify
2000	4	USL PDL	4th, Great Lakes	Conference Semifinals	Did not qualify
2001	4	USL PDL	2nd, Great Lakes	Did not qualify	Did not qualify
2002	4	USL PDL	3rd, Great Lakes	Did not qualify	Did not qualify
2003	On Hiatus				
2004	4	USL PDL	6th, Great Lakes	Did not qualify	Did not qualify
2005	4	USL PDL	6th, Great Lakes	Did not qualify	Did not qualify
2006	4	USL PDL	5th, Great Lakes	Did not qualify	Did not qualify
2007	4	USL PDL	3rd, Great Lakes	Did not qualify	Did not qualify
2008	4	USL PDL	5th, Midwest	Did not qualify	Did not qualify

== Head coaches ==
- (Netherlands) Erwin van Elst (1995)
- (United States) Tim Hendrickson (1996)
- (United States) Aric Dershem (1997)
- (United States) Mark "Moose" Noorzai (1997)
- (England) Carl Whitehouse (1998)
- (United States) Jamie Huff (1999–2000)
- (United States) Joey Barone (2005–2006)
- (United States) Mark Bell (2007)
- (United States) Stephen Herdsman (2008)

=== Additional Coaches & Members ===
- (United States) Ben Pirmann (2007 - 2008).

== Stadia ==
- Velting Field; Grand Rapids, Michigan (1995)
- no home games (1996)
- Calvin College; Grand Rapids, Michigan (1997–98)
  - Holland Municipal Stadium; Holland, Michigan 1 game (1998)
  - Lowell High School; Lowell, Michigan 1 game (1998)
- Cornerstone College; Grand Rapids, Michigan (1999)
- East Grant Rapids Middle School; East Grand Rapids, Michigan (2000)
- Holland Municipal Stadium; Holland, Michigan (2004)
- Stadium at Forest Hills Central High School; Grand Rapids, Michigan (2005–2007)
  - Stadium at Mona Shores High School; Muskegon, Michigan 1 game (2005)
  - Stadium at Cornerstone University; Grand Rapids, Michigan 4 games (2007)
  - East Grand Rapids Memorial Field; Grand Rapids, Michigan 2 games (2007)
  - Stadium at Crestwood Middle School; Kentwood, Michigan 1 game (2007)
- EK Stadium; Kentwood, Michigan (2008)

== Average Attendances ==
- 2008: 125
- 2007: 89
- 2006: 298
- 2005: 412
