= Central Coast Roadrunners =

- Full name: Central Coast Roadrunners
- Nickname: The Roadrunners
- Founded: 1996
- Ground: Mustang Stadium
- Capacity: 8,500
- Chairman: Larry Smyth
- Manager: Bob Wilson
- League: Premier Development League
- 2002: 5th, did not make playoffs
Home colours

Central Coast Roadrunners were an American soccer team, founded in 1996. The team was a member of the United Soccer Leagues Premier Development League (PDL), the fourth tier of the American Soccer Pyramid, until 2002, after which the team left the league and the franchise rights were transferred to the newly formed Fresno Fuego. The Roadrunners were one of the most successful PDL franchises in California, winning the national championship in 1996 and 1997.

Their chairman, Larry Smyth, was inducted into the USL Hall of Fame in 2004, and was the first person to be inducted into the USL Hall of Fame via vote in the Builder category, which has an automatic induction for owners and executives who have served 10 years in the USL.

They played their home games in Mustang Stadium on the grounds of California Polytechnic State University just outside San Luis Obispo, California. The team's colors were blue and white.

== Year-by-year ==
Year	Division	League	Reg. season	Playoffs	Open Cup
1996	"4"	USISL Prem	1st, Western South	Champions	Did not qualify
1997	"4"	USL PDSL	2nd, Southwest	Champions	Round 3
1998	"4"	USL PDSL	4th, Southwest	Did not qualify	Did not qualify
1999	"4"	USL PDL	2nd, Southwest	Conference Semi-finals	Did not qualify
2000	"4"	USL PDL	2nd, Southwest	Did not qualify	Did not qualify
2001	"4"	USL PDL	3rd, Southwest	Did not qualify	Round 2
2002	"4"	USL PDL	5th, Southwest	Did not qualify	Did not qualify
