= Cocoa Expos =

- Full name: Cocoa Expos
- Nickname: The Expos
- Founded: 1993
- Dissolved: 2007; 19 years ago
- Stadium: Cocoa Municipal Stadium
- Capacity: 3,000
- Chairman: (United States) Giles Malone
- Manager: (Germany) Udo Schenatzky
- League: USL Premier Development League
- 2007: 8th, Southeast Division
Home colours	Away colours

Cocoa Expos was an American soccer team, founded in 1993. The team was a member of the United Soccer Leagues Premier Development League (PDL), the fourth tier of the American Soccer Pyramid, until 2007, when the team left the league and the franchise was terminated.

The team played its home matches at the Cocoa Municipal Stadium in Cocoa, Florida, approximately 45 miles from Orlando. The team's colors were blue and white.

The team also had a sister organization, the Cocoa Expos Women, which played in the women's USL W-League, but also folded at the end of 2007.

== Year-by-year ==
Year	Division	League	Regular season	Playoffs	Open Cup
1993/94	N/A	USISL Indoor	3rd, Southeast	Did not qualify	N/A
1994	N/A	USISL	1st, Southeast	Sizzling Nine	N/A
1994/95	N/A	USISL Indoor	2nd, North/South	Did not qualify	N/A
1995	N/A	USISL Premier	1st, Eastern	Runner-up	Did not qualify
1995/96	N/A	USISL Indoor	4th, Southeast	Did not qualify	N/A
1996	4	USISL Premier	1st, EASTERN Southern	Premier Six	Did not qualify
1997	4	USISL PDSL	1st, Southeast	Runner-up	Did not qualify
1998	4	USISL PDSL	2nd, Southeast	Regional Finals	Did not qualify
1999	4	USL PDL	2nd, Southeast	Conference Semifinals	2nd Round
2000	4	USL PDL	3rd, Southeast	Did not qualify	Did not qualify
2001	4	USL PDL	1st, Southeast	Conference Finals	Did not qualify
2002	4	USL PDL	5th, Southeast	Did not qualify	Did not qualify
2003	4	USL PDL	1st, Southeast	Conference Semifinals	Did not qualify
2004	4	USL PDL	2nd, Southeast	Conference Finals	2nd Round
2005	4	USL PDL	1st, Southeast	Conference Semifinals	Qualifying Round
2006	4	USL PDL	3rd, Southeast	Did not qualify	Did not qualify
2007	4	USL PDL	8th, Southeast	Did not qualify	Did not qualify

== Honors ==
- USL PDL Southeast Division Champions 2005
- USL PDL Southeast Division Champions 2003
- USL PDL Southeast Division Champions 2001
- USISL PDL National Championship Runner-up 1997
- USISL PDL Southeast Division Champions 1997
- USISL Premier League Eastern/Southern Division Champions 1996
- USISL Premier League Eastern Division Champions 1995
- USISL Premier League Southeast Division Champions 1994

== Competition history ==
After joining the league in 1994, the Expos became one of the most successful and popular teams in the USL Premier Development League. In their first three seasons, from 1994 to 1997, the team lost only three regular season games and played in the Conference Championship game four times, in 1995, 1997, 2001, and 2004. During their 2001 preseason, the Expos played former the Major League Soccer franchise Tampa Bay Mutiny and lost only 1–0. In 2005, the Expos qualified for the Lamar Hunt U.S. Open Cup for the third time. However, their final season in 2007 proved disastrous, with the team losing 13 of 15 matches and scoring just one goal all season.

== Coaches ==
- (England) Chris Ramsey 1991–1992
- (England) Alan Dicks 1994
- (Scotland) Gerry Queen 2001–2006
- (Germany) Udo Schenatzky 2007

== Stadia ==
- Cocoa Municipal Stadium, Cocoa, Florida 2003–07

== Average attendance ==
https://kenn.com/blog/soccer/all-time-usl-league-two-attendance/

- 1994: NA
- 1995: NA
- 1996: 574 (12th in Premier League) Playoffs: NA
- 1997: 711 (6th in PDSL) Playoffs: 1,125 *1 Missing
- 1998: 347 (14th in PDSL)
- 1999: 356 (13th in PDL)
- 2000: 350 (10th in PDL)
- 2001: 101 (37th in PDL) Playoffs: 350 *1 Missing
- 2002: 84 (43rd in PDL)
- 2003: 84 (49th in PDL)
- 2004: 319 (28th in PDL)
- 2005: 209 (37th in PDL)
- 2006: 197 (45th in PDL)
- 2007: 197 (49th in PDL)
