= Nashville Metros =

- Full name: Nashville Metros
- Nickname: The Metros
- Founded: 1989
- Dissolved: 2012
- Stadium: Ezell Park; Nashville, Tennessee
- Capacity: 5,000
- Owners: Lynn Agee; Martin Maciel; Devinder Sandhu
- Head Coach: Brent Goulet (final)
- League: Premier Development League
- 2012 (final): 4th, South Atlantic; Playoffs: DNQ
- Website: http://www.metrossoccer.com
Home colors	Away colors

The Nashville Metros were an American soccer team based in Nashville, Tennessee, United States. Founded in 1989, the team most recently played in the Premier Development League (PDL), the fourth tier of the American Soccer Pyramid, in the South Atlantic Division of the Eastern Conference. The Metros were the longest continuously operating soccer club in the United Soccer Leagues before their last season in 2012.

In the side's later years its home games were contested at Ezell Park and E. S. Rose Park.

== History ==
Original logo

The Nashville Metros were founded by Lynn Agee and Devinder Sandhu and began indoor play in the Sunbelt Independent Soccer League in 1990. Due to a lack of facilities, the team played their entire first season on the road, before settling in Smyrna. The Metros continued to play indoors until 1996, but only won six matches in six seasons. During much of the same period, the outdoor team played in the USL's amateur Premier League with significantly better results. Nashville's first winning season came in 1995 with a 12–6 record and their first playoff appearance. The 1996 team witnessed the Metros' Pasi Kinturi score a league-leading 19 goals as he was named that season's league MVP.

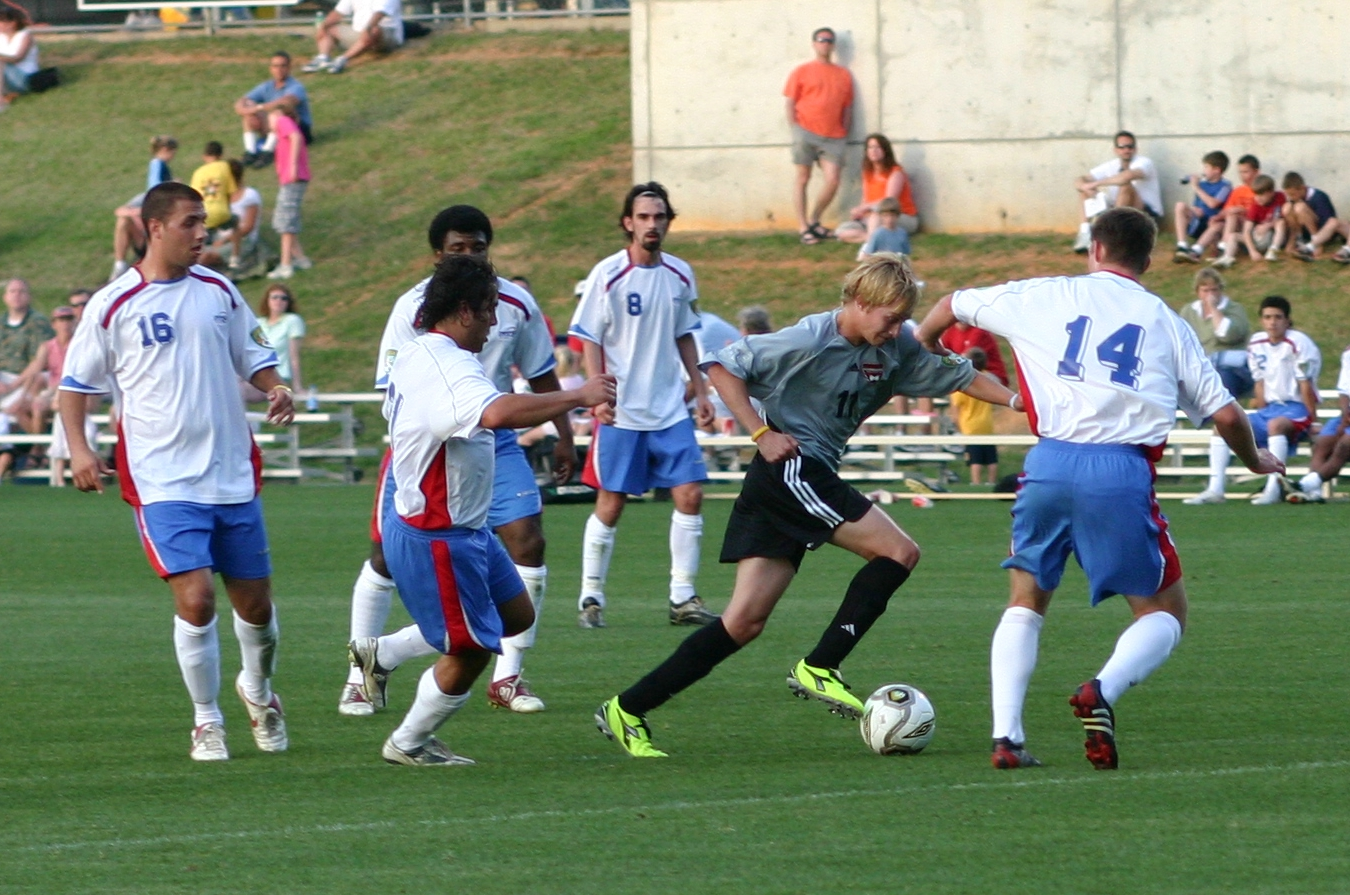
Nashville (white shirts) v Raleigh Elite in 2006

The Metros moved up to the second division A-League in 1997. After several years of playing at various high school and municipal stadiums in Nashville and Franklin, the team settled into their new home at Ezell Park. Nashville made their first U.S. Open Cup appearance in the 1998 tournament where they routed the third division Delaware Wizards before advancing to face the Kansas City Wizards of Major League Soccer. A heavy underdog, the Metros pulled off the upset of the tournament with a victory over the first division club in front of an ecstatic home crowd. Nashville eventually fell in the quarterfinals to MLS' Dallas Burn.

In 1999 due to financial circumstances, the club was forced to reorganize. The side was renamed the "Tennessee Rhythm" and moved from Nashville to Franklin, but returned to their original venue in 2001, reverting to their original name at the same time. This time period featured an unsuccessful rematch against the Dallas Burn in the 2000 U.S. Open Cup and a nationally televised game against the Los Angeles Galaxy in the 2001 tournament. In 2002 the Metros moved down from the A-League to the Premier Development League, mainly due to Ezell Park's substandard facilities, such as the lack of a press box.

Beginning with their first playoff appearance in 1994, Nashville made eight postseason trips over the next 11 years.

== Players ==
=== Final roster ===
Note: Flags indicate national team as defined under FIFA eligibility rules; some limited exceptions apply. Players may hold more than one non-FIFA nationality.

No.	Pos.	Nation	Player
0	GK	USA	James Holt
2	DF	GAM	Sambou Tamba
3	DF	CIV	Beh Leandre Pacome
4	DF	GAM	Samba Amadou Bah
5	DF	NGA	Gift Ndam
6	MF	GAM	Ebrima Njie
7	MF	USA	Elijah Yazdani
8	MF	GAM	Mandou Bojang
9	MF	USA	Kieran McFadden
10	FW	MEX	Francisco Maciel
11	MF	PER	Edwin Bryan
12	DF	USA	Nick Dykes

No.	Pos.	Nation	Player
13	DF	GUY	Jomo Cromwell
14	FW	USA	William Dugger
15	MF	USA	Osiris Valle
16	MF	USA	Stefan Vaziri
17	FW	SOM	Omar Abdiaziz
18	MF	USA	J. J. Jackson
19	DF	USA	Matthew Reed
29	FW	PER	Victor Galicia
77	MF	KEN	Abdikadir N Mohamed
20	DF	USA	Jose Cardenas
21	MF	USA	Keegan Terry
23	FW	GAM	Malang Fatty
30	GK	USA	Jordan Werner

=== Notable former players ===
This list of notable former players comprises players who went on to play professional soccer after playing for the team, or those who previously played professionally before joining the team.

- (United States) Jay Ayres
- (United States) Kainoa Bailey
- (Bulgaria) Kalin Bankov
- (United States) Trevor Banks
- (United States) Ian Borders
- (United States) Jon Busch
- (United States) Danny DeVall
- (United States) Tanner Redden
- (United States) Gabe Eastman
- (Australia) Albert Edward
- (United States) John Jones
- (Finland) Pasi Kinturi
- (United States) Patrick Parker
- (United States) Steve Klein
- (United States) Tony Kuhn
- (United States) Jamel Mitchell
- (United States) Richard Mulrooney
- (United States) Dimitry Shamootin
- (Guyana) J. P. Rodrigues
- (United States) Daryl Sattler

== Year-by-year ==
Year	Division	League	Regular season	Playoffs	Open Cup
1991	N/A	SISL	4th, Southeast	Did not qualify	Did not enter
1992	N/A	USISL	5th, Southeast	Did not qualify	Did not enter
1993	N/A	USISL	6th, Southeast	Did not qualify	Did not enter
1994	3	USISL	5th, Midsouth	Divisional Semifinals	Did not enter
1995	4	USISL Premier	3rd, Eastern	Divisional Semifinals	Did not qualify
1996	4	USISL Premier	4th, Eastern Northern	Division Finals	Did not qualify
1997	2	USISL A-League	2nd, Central	Division Semifinals	Did not qualify
1998	2	USISL A-League	1st, Central	Conference Quarterfinals	Quarter Finals
1999	2	USL A-League	6th, Central	Did not qualify	Did not qualify
2000	2	USL A-League	5th, Central	Did not qualify	2nd Round
2001	2	USL A-League	4th, Central	1st Round	2nd Round
2002	4	USL PDL	4th, Mid South	1st Round	Did not qualify
2003	4	USL PDL	3rd, Mid South	Did not qualify	Did not qualify
2004	4	USL PDL	4th, Mid South	Conference Semifinals	Did not qualify
2005	4	USL PDL	5th, Mid South	Did not qualify	Did not qualify
2006	4	USL PDL	5th, South Atlantic	Did not qualify	Did not qualify
2007	4	USL PDL	7th, Southeast	Did not qualify	Did not qualify
2008	4	USL PDL	7th, Southeast	Did not qualify	Did not qualify
2009	4	USL PDL	7th, Southeast	Did not qualify	Did not qualify
2010	4	USL PDL	7th, Southeast	Did not qualify	Did not qualify
2011	4	USL PDL	5th, Southeast	Did not qualify	Did not qualify
2012	4	USL PDL	4th, South Atlantic	Did not qualify	Did not qualify

=== Indoor ===
Year	Division	League	Regular season	Playoffs
1990/91	N/A	SISL Indoor	9th, Southeast	Did not qualify
1991/92	N/A	USISL Indoor	4th, Southeast	Did not qualify
1992/93	N/A	USISL Indoor	4th, Southeast	Playoffs
1993/94	N/A	USISL Indoor	6th, Southeast	Did not qualify
1994/95	N/A	USISL Indoor	4th, Mid South	Did not qualify
1995/96	N/A	USISL Indoor	7th, Southeast	Did not qualify

== Honors ==
- USISL A-League
  - Central Conference Champions (1): 1998

== Head coaches ==
- (United States) Greg Petersen (1998–1999)
- (United States) Brett Mosen (2000–2001)
- (United States) Andy Poklad (2002–2004)
- (Costa Rica) Rico Laise (1999, 2007–2008)
- (England) Richard Askey (2009)
- (United States) Obed Compean (2005–2006, 2010)
- (Mexico) Ricardo Lopez (2011)
- (United States) Brent Goulet (2012)

== Stadium ==
- Stadiums in Nashville and Franklin, Tennessee; (1990–1996)
- Stadium in Franklin, Tennessee; (1999–2000)
- Ezell Park; Nashville, Tennessee (1997–1998, 2001–2011)
  - Siegel Park; Murfreesboro, Tennessee 5 games (2007–2010)
- E.S. Rose Park; Nashville, Tennessee; (2012)

== Average attendance ==
Attendance stats are calculated by averaging each team's self-reported home attendances from the historical match archive at https://web.archive.org/web/20131208011525/http://www.uslsoccer.com/history/index_E.html.

- 2005: 307
- 2006: 392 (8th in PDL)
- 2007: 361
- 2008: 308
- 2009: 162
- 2010: 215
- 2011: 349
