= 1999 PDL season =

USL Premier Development League
- Season: 1999
- Champions: Chicago Sockers (1st Title)
- Regular Season Champions: Jackson Chargers (2nd Title)
- Matches: 323
- Goals: 1,392 (4.31 per match)
- Best player: (Germany) Fabio Eidelwein Sioux City Breeze
- Top goalscorer: (Germany) Fabio Eidelwein Sioux City Breeze (20 Goals)
- Best goalkeeper: (United States) Jeremy DoBay Jackson Chargers

The 1999 USL Premier Development League season was the 5th PDL season. The season began in April 1999 and ended in August 1999.

Chicago Sockers finished the season as national champions, beating Spokane Shadow 3–1 in the PDL Championship game. Jackson Chargers had finished with the best regular season record in the league, winning 14 out of their 16 games, suffering just two losses, and finishing with a +55 goal difference.

== Changes from 1998 season ==
=== Name changes ===
- Abbotsford Athletes In Action changed their name to the Abbotsford 86ers Select.
- Central Florida Lionhearts changed their name to the Central Florida Kraze.
- Fox River Rebels changed their name to the Wisconsin Rebels.
- Grand Rapids Explosion changed their name to West Michigan Explosion.
- Seattle Hibernians changed their name to Seattle Sounders Select.

=== New teams ===
18 teams were added for the season, including 7 expansion teams and four who had returned from hiatus.

Team	Area	Location	Previous affiliation
(New York (state)) Brooklyn Knights	Brooklyn (NYC) area	Brooklyn, NY	expansion
(New York (state)) Capital District Shockers	New York Capital District area	Albany, NY	from D-3 Pro League
(New Jersey) Central Jersey Riptide	Central Jersey area	Trenton, NJ	from D-3 Pro League
(Illinois) Chicago Sockers	Chicago area	Chicago, IL	from D-3 Pro League
(Tennessee) Clarksville Gunners	Clarksville area	Clarksville, TN	expansion
(Kentucky) Lexington Bluegrass Bandits	Lexington area	Lexington, KY	returned from hiatus
(Florida) Miami Breakers	Miami area	Miami, FL	from D-3 Pro League
Nevada Zephyrs	Las Vegas area	Las Vegas, NV	expansion
(New York (state)) New York Freedom	New York City area	New York, NY	expansion
(Florida) Orlando Nighthawks	Central Florida area	Orlando, FL	from D-3 Pro League
(Illinois) Rockford Raptors	Rockford area	Rockford, IL	from D-3 Pro League
(California) San Fernando Valley Heroes	Los Angeles area	Los Angeles, CA	from D-3 Pro League
(Missouri) Team St. Louis	St. Louis area	St. Louis, MO	expansion
(Arizona) Tucson Amigos	Tucson area	Tucson, AZ	returned from hiatus
Vermont Voltage	Vermont area	St. Albans, VT	from D-3 Pro League
(New York (state)) Westchester Flames	Suburban Mainland New York area	New Rochelle, NY	expansion
(Kansas) Wichita Blue	Wichita area	Wichita, KS	returned from hiatus
(Oregon) Willamette Valley Firebirds	Portland area	Portland, OR	returned from hiatus

=== Teams leaving ===
5 teams folded after the 1998 Season:

- Detroit Dynamite
- Lansing Locomotive
- Northern Arizona Prospectors
- Seattle BigFoot
- Southern California Chivas

Alabama Saints and South Florida Future went on hiatus for this season.

Okanagan Valley Challenge and Victoria Umbro Select returned to the PCSL, ending their associate membership. Abbotsford Athletes In Action and Seattle Hibernian retained their membership.

== Standings ==
Legend
Division champion
Team qualified for playoff berth
Team gets bye into semifinals as host.

=== Central Conference ===
==== Great Lakes Division ====
Pos	Team	Pld	W	PKW	PKL	L	GF	GA	GD	BP	Pts
1	Mid-Michigan Bucks	16	13	1	0	2	62	14	+48	11	65
2	Chicago Sockers	16	11	1	1	3	41	14	+27	7	54
3	Wisconsin Rebels	16	10	1	0	5	45	37	+8	9	51
4	Indiana Invaders	16	7	0	0	9	34	44	−10	7	35
5	Kalamazoo Kingdom	16	5	1	1	9	28	45	−17	5	28
6	Rockford Raptors	16	2	0	2	12	23	61	−38	3	13
7	West Michigan Explosion	16	2	0	0	14	17	49	−32	2	10 (Note: RSSSF recorded 5 total points.)

==== Heartland Division ====
Pos	Team	Pld	W	PKW	PKL	L	GF	GA	GD	BP	Pts
1	Twin Cities Tornado	16	14	0	0	2	55	18	+37	9	65
2	Sioux City Breeze	16	13	0	0	3	52	25	+27	9	61
3	Colorado Comets	15	8	0	1	6	48	33	+15	9	42
4	Des Moines Menace	16	7	0	1	8	33	36	−3	5	34
5	Kansas City Brass	16	4	2	0	10	23	38	−15	4	24
6	Team St. Louis	6	5	0	0	1	28	8	+20	4	24 (Note: Provisional team: does not play a full schedule.)
7	Wichita Blue	11	3	0	2	6	13	43	−30	2	16 (Note: Wichita Blue folded during the season.)
8	Colorado Springs Stampede	15	1	2	0	12	21	52	−31	2	10

=== Eastern Conference ===
==== Northeast Division ====
Pos	Team	Pld	W	PKW	PKL	L	GF	GA	GD	BP	Pts
1	New York Freedom	16	10	1	1	4	40	27	+13	8	51 (Note: RSSSF recorded 52 total points.)
2	Central Jersey Riptide	16	8	0	1	7	40	28	+12	9	42 (Note: RSSSF recorded 36 total points.)
3	Brooklyn Knights	16	5	2	0	9	29	42	−13	5	29
4	Westchester Flames	16	6	1	0	9	19	32	−13	3	29
5	Vermont Voltage	16	4	0	1	11	26	42	−16	4	21
6	Capital District Shockers	16	2	0	0	14	18	65	−47	1	9

==== Southeast Division ====
Pos	Team	Pld	W	PKW	PKL	L	GF	GA	GD	BP	Pts
1	Jackson Chargers (R)	16	14	0	0	2	67	12	+55	11	67
2	Cocoa Expos	16	10	2	0	4	58	24	+34	10	54
3	Central Florida Kraze	16	10	0	1	5	47	23	+24	8	49
4	Miami Breakers	16	8	1	0	7	29	32	−3	6	40
5	Bradenton Academics	16	8	0	1	7	28	32	−4	5	38
6	Clarksville Gunners	16	5	1	1	9	28	37	−9	3	26
7	Miami Tango	16	4	1	0	11	25	61	−36	5	23
8	Lexington Bluegrass Bandits	6	3	0	0	3	17	14	+3	4	16
9	Orlando Nighthawks	16	1	0	1	14	13	63	−50	0	5

(R) Regular Season Champions

=== Western Conference ===
==== Northwest Division ====
Pos	Team	Pld	W	PKW	PKL	L	GF	GA	GD	BP	Pts
1	Willamette Valley Firebirds	16	14	0	0	2	54	20	+34	10	66
2	Spokane Shadow	16	10	0	0	6	36	21	+15	8	48
3	Abbotsford 86ers Select	16	8	0	1	7	36	32	+4	7	40
4	Seattle Sounders Select	16	6	2	0	8	19	32	−13	1	29
5	Yakima Reds	16	5	1	1	9	31	43	−12	6	29
6	Cascade Surge	16	2	0	1	13	19	47	−28	3	12

==== Southwest Division ====
Pos	Team	Pld	W	PKW	PKL	L	GF	GA	GD	BP	Pts
1	San Fernando Valley Heroes	16	9	4	0	3	53	21	+32	8	52
2	Central Coast Roadrunners	16	7	1	1	7	32	24	+8	7	38
3	Nevada Zephyrs	16	7	0	0	9	26	31	−5	4	32
4	San Gabriel Valley Highlanders	16	6	0	0	10	33	51	−18	6	30 (Note: RSSSF recorded 27 total points.)
5	Silicon Valley Ambassadors	16	5	0	2	9	23	44	−21	2	24
6	Tucson Amigos	16	3	0	2	11	23	41	−18	1	15

== Playoffs ==
Spokane hosted the Finals and received a bye to the National Semi-Finals.

Central Semifinals
GL1	Mid-Michigan Bucks	1
HL2	(Iowa) Sioux City Breeze	2
HL1	(Minnesota) Twin Cities Tornado	0
GL2	(Illinois) Chicago Sockers	2

Central Finals
HL2	(Iowa) Sioux City Breeze	1
GL2	(Illinois) Chicago Sockers	3

Central Conference Playoffs
August 6, 1999
7:00 PM EDT
Semifinals

Mid-Michigan Bucks	1–2	(Iowa) Sioux City Breeze
Paul Snape (red card) 59'; Dominic Scicluna (yellow card) 65'; Mike Dodd (yellow card) 69'; Stephen Armstrong 80'	Report	44', 60' (pen.) Fabio Eidelwein; (yellow card) 57' Hakeem Koroma

White Pine Stadium
Saginaw Township, Michigan
Attendance: 752
Referee: Shaun Soraghan
August 6, 1999
9:00 PM EDT
Semifinals

(Minnesota) Twin Cities Tornado	0–2	(Illinois) Chicago Sockers
	Report	10' Hernan Campuzano; 70' Matt Hamnett

White Pine Stadium
Saginaw Township, Michigan

August 7, 1999
7:30 PM EDT
Conference Final

(Iowa) Sioux City Breeze	1–3	(Illinois) Chicago Sockers
Fabio Eidelwein 19'	Report	33' Hernan Campuzano; 39', 90' Matt Hamnett

White Pine Stadium
Saginaw Township, Michigan
Attendance: 112

Eastern Semifinals
SE1	(Mississippi) Jackson Chargers	9
NE2	(New York (state)) Brooklyn Knights	1
NE1	(New York (state)) New York Freedom	3
SE2	(Florida) Cocoa Expos	1

Eastern Finals
HL2	(Mississippi) Jackson Chargers	0
GL2	(New York (state)) New York Freedom	1

Eastern Conference Playoffs
August 6, 1999
7:00 PM CDT
Semifinals

(Mississippi) Jackson Chargers	9–1	(New York (state)) Brooklyn Knights
Paul Oyuga 10'; Bonaventure Maruti 12', 20', 39', 52'; Jon Marcus Duncan; Jeremy Shortt; Ousmark Coulibaly	Report	62' Alex Dixon

Jackson, Mississippi
August 6, 1999
9:00 PM CDT
Semifinals

(Florida) Cocoa Expos	1–3	(New York (state)) New York Freedom
Steve Butcher 18'	Report	Mawssa Sy; Boubu Camara

Jackson, Mississippi

August 7, 1999
8:30 PM CDT
Conference Final

(Mississippi) Jackson Chargers	0–1	(New York (state)) New York Freedom
	Report	73' Alex Vargas

Jackson, Mississippi

Western Semifinals
NW1	(Oregon) Willamette Valley Firebirds	1
SW2	(California) Central Coast Roadrunners	0
SW1	(California) San Fernando Valley Heroes	1
NW2	(British Columbia) Abbotsford 86ers Select	2

Western Finals
NW1	(Oregon) Willamette Valley Firebirds	5
NW2	(British Columbia) Abbotsford 86ers Select	1

Western Conference Playoffs
August 7, 1999
5:30 PM PDT
Semifinals

(California) Central Coast Roadrunners	0–1	(Oregon) Willamette Valley Firebirds
	Report	35' Greg Howes

Citrus College
Glendora, California
August 7, 1999
8:00 PM PDT
Semifinals

(California) San Fernando Valley Heroes	1–2	(British Columbia) Abbotsford 86ers Select
	Report	44' Robert Hall; 60' David Morris

Citrus College
Glendora, California

August 8, 1999
3:00 PM PDT
Conference Final

(Oregon) Willamette Valley Firebirds	5–1	(British Columbia) Abbotsford 86ers Select
JP Capodanno 34', 88'; Bryan Ritchie 39'; Greg Howes 48', 80'	Report	17' (pen.) Ken Strain

Citrus College
Glendora, California

PDL Semifinals
NW1	(Oregon) Willamette Valley Firebirds	1
H	(Washington (state)) Spokane Shadow	2
NE1	(New York (state)) New York Freedom	0
GL2	(Illinois) Chicago Sockers	1

PDL Finals
H	(Washington (state)) Spokane Shadow	1
GL2	(Illinois) Chicago Sockers	3
PDL Third Place
NW1	(Oregon) Willamette Valley Firebirds	2
NE1	(New York (state)) New York Freedom	5

PDL National Semifinals
August 14, 1999
6:00 PM PDT
Semifinals

(Illinois) Chicago Sockers	1–0	(New York (state)) New York Freedom
Harkness 25'; Campuzano (yellow card) 71'	Report	(yellow card) 35' Thomas Donahue; (yellow card) 58' Brendan O'Boyle (yellow card) 58'; (yellow card) 90' Rodney Rambo

Joe Albi Stadium
Spokane, Washington
Attendance: 3,829
August 14, 1999
8:30 PM PDT
Semifinals

(Washington (state)) Spokane Shadow	2–1	(Oregon) Willamette Valley Firebirds
Craig Hampton (yellow card) 20'; Stuart Saunders (yellow card) 35'; Zane Higgins 65'; Jeff Rose 68'; Chad Brown (yellow card) 84'	Report	16' Greg Howes

Joe Albi Stadium
Spokane, Washington
Attendance: 3,829

Third Place Game
August 15, 1999
6:00 PM PDT
Final

(Oregon) Willamette Valley Firebirds	2–5	(New York (state)) New York Freedom
Greg Howes 59', 83'	Report	4', 40', 65' Joseph Navarino; 38' Alexander Vargas; 83' Leonard Doramodou

Joe Albi Stadium
Spokane, Washington
PDL Championship Game
August 15, 1999
8:30 PM PDT

(Washington (state)) Spokane Shadow	1–3	(Illinois) Chicago Sockers
Jeff Rose 88'	Report	18' Chuck Codd; 44' Mike Dunne; 73' Andy McDermott

Joe Albi Stadium
Spokane, Washington
Attendance: 3,843

== Awards ==
=== Year End Awards ===
Scoring Champion: (Germany) Fabio Eidelwein (Sioux City Breeze) 48 Points (20 Goals, 8 Assists) Golden Boot: (Germany) Fabio Eidelwein (Sioux City Breeze) (20 Goals)
Assists Champion: (England) Paul Snape (Michigan Bucks) (11 Assists)
GAA Champion: (United States) Jeremy DoBay (Jackson Chargers) 0.84 Goals Against
MVP: (Germany) Fabio Eidelwein (Sioux City Breeze)
Rookie of the Year: (Canada) David Morris (Abbotsford 86ers Select)
Defender of the Year: (United States) Joe Marks (Spokane Shadow) and (United States) Mark Schulte (Twin Cities Tornado)
Goalkeeper of the Year: (United States) Jeremy DoBay (Jackson Chargers)
Coach of the Year: (United States) Tony Vandermeer (Willamette Valley Firebirds)

=== Weekly awards ===
Player of the Week
Week	Player	Club	Position	Reason	Ref.
3	(England) Ben Hunter	Carolina Dynamo	Forward	3 goals, 2 assists in 6–1 win over Nashville Metros	
4	(United States) Mike Todd	Brooklyn Knights	Forward	4 goals in pair of wins	
5	(Bosnia and Herzegovina) Vedad Ibišević	St. Louis Strikers	Forward	5 goals in 6–4 win over Kansas City Brass	
6	(United States) Brad Guzan	Chicago Fire Reserves	Goalkeeper	Three shutouts against Wisconsin Blast, Thunder Bay Chill, and Des Moines Menace	
7	(United States) Tony Amato	Cocoa Expos	Midfielder	Hat-trick in 3-2 OT win over Palm Beach Pumas	
8	(United States) Alejandro Salazar	Boulder Rapids Reserve	Midfielder	4 goals, 2 assists in 2 wins, draw	
9	(United States) Alex Brown	Williamsburg Legacy	Defender	2 goals, 1 assist in 5-4 OT win at Sioux Falls Spitfire	
10	(England) Dan Broxup	Fort Wayne Fever	Forward	Hat-trick, assist in 4–1 win over Toledo Slayers	
11	(Brazil) Zico Antunes	Rhode Island Stingrays	Forward	Hat-trick, assist in 5–2 win over Western Mass Pioneers	
12	(United States) David Bulow	Cape Cod Crusaders	Forward	Hat-trick in 4-3 OT win at Reading Rage	
13	(Jamaica) Orville Mullings	Central Florida Kraze	Forward	Seven goals in wins at Lafayette Swamp Cats, New Orleans Shell Shockers	
14	(United States) David Bulow	Cape Cod Crusaders	Forward	Four goals, two assists in pair of wins	

=== All-League Team ===
F: (Germany) Fabio Eidelwein (SCB) (League MVP, Scoring Champion and Golden Boot), (Kenya) Bonaventure Maruti (JAC), (Canada) David Morris (ABB) (Rookie of the Year)
M: (United States) Nick Downing (SSS), (United States) Chris Edwinson (COL), (United States) Seth Modersohn (DMM)
D: (United States) Pablo Gentile (MIA), (United States) Joe Marks (SPO) (Co-Defender of the Year), (United States) Jim McElderry (NYF), (United States) Mark Schulte (TCT) (Co-Defender of the Year)
G: (United States) Jeremy DoBay (JAC) (Goalkeeper of the Year)

=== All-Tournament Team ===
F: (United States) Zane Higgins (SPO), (United States) Jeff Rose (SPO), (United States) Joe Navarino (NYF), (United States) J.P. Capodanno (NYF)
M: (United States) Andy McDermott (CHI), (United States) Greg Howes (WVF)
D: (United States) Chris Jahr (CHI), (United States) Billy Sleeth (SPO), (United States) Iain Williams (CHI) (Tournament MVP)
G: (United States) Adam Throop (CHI), (United States) Roberto Christian Sir (NYF)
