= 1998 PDSL season =

Premier Development Soccer League
- Season: 1998
- Champions: San Gabriel Valley Highlanders (1st Title)
- Regular Season Champions: Jackson Chargers (1st Title)
- Matches: 248
- Goals: 1,140 (4.6 per match)
- Best Player: (Brazil) Rodrigo Costa Detroit Dynamite
- Top goalscorer: (Kenya) Bonaventure Maruti Jackson Chargers (27 Goals)
- Best goalkeeper: (United States) Joshua Fouts Spokane Shadow
- Longest winning run: Jackson Chargers 16 Games Entire Season
- Longest unbeaten run: Jackson Chargers 16 Games Entire Season

The 1998 Premier Development Soccer League season was the 4th PDSL season. The season began in April 1998 and ended in August 1998.

San Gabriel Valley Highlanders won the championship, defeating the Jackson Chargers 3–2. Jackson won the regular season title, winning all 16 games and posting a whopping +84 goal difference. Four teams from the Pacific Coast Soccer League joined as associate members this season, with two (Abbotsford and Seattle) going on to become full members in 1999.

== Changes from the 1997 season ==
=== Name changes ===
- Puget Sound BigFoot changed name to Seattle BigFoot.

=== New teams ===
13 teams were added for the season, 9 expansion teams and four associates from the Pacific Coast Soccer League.

Team	Area	Location	Previous affiliation
(British Columbia) Abbotsford Athletes In Action	Abbotsford area	Abbotsford, BC	Pacific Coast Soccer League
(Florida) Bradenton Academics	Southwest Florida area	Bradenton, FL	expansion
Central Florida Lionhearts	Central Florida area	Seminole, FL	expansion
Colorado Comets	Denver area	Commerce City, CO	expansion
(Wisconsin) Fox River Rebels	Fox Cities area	Menasha, WI	expansion
Indiana Invaders	Michiana area	South Bend, IN	expansion
(Missouri) Kansas City Brass	Kansas City area	Liberty, MO	expansion
(Florida) Miami Tango	Greater Miami area	Miami, FL	expansion
Northern Arizona Prospectors	Prescott-Chino Valley area	Prescott Valley, AZ	expansion
(British Columbia) Okanagan Valley Challenge	Okanagan Valley area	Kelowna, BC	Pacific Coast Soccer League
(Washington (state)) Seattle Hibernian	Seattle area	Seattle, WA	Pacific Coast Soccer League
(California) Silicon Valley Ambassadors	South San Francisco Bay area	Santa Clara, CA	expansion
(British Columbia) Victoria Umbro Select	Vancouver Island area	Victoria, BC	Pacific Coast Soccer League

=== Teams leaving ===
The Cincinnati Riverhawks were promoted to the A-League and the Miami Breakers were promoted to the D3 Pro League following the 1997 season.

7 teams folded after the 1997 season:

- Bellingham Orcas
- Chattanooga Express
- Lincoln Brigade
- Michigan Madness
- Omaha Flames (team folded early in 1998 season, division games were rescheduled)
- Southwest Florida Manatees
- West Florida Fury

The Lexington Bluegrass Bandits and Tucson Amigos went on hiatus for this year.

== Standings ==
Legend
Division champion
Team qualified for playoff berth
Team gets bye into semifinals as host.

=== Central Division ===
Pos	Team	Pld	W	PKW	PKL	L	GF	GA	GD	Pts
1	Colorado Comets	16	13	0	1	2	40	16	+24	39
2	Des Moines Menace	16	9	2	1	4	51	27	+24	29 (Note: Des Moines and Sioux City were both penalized 2 points.)
3	Twin Cities Tornado	16	9	0	1	6	32	33	−1	27
4	Kansas City Brass	16	7	0	1	8	42	29	+13	21
5	Sioux City Breeze	16	5	2	1	8	28	31	−3	17
6	Colorado Springs Stampede	16	4	1	0	11	20	46	−26	13 (Note: Colorado Springs was penalized 1 point.)

Source: RSSSF

=== Great Lakes Division ===
Pos	Team	Pld	W	PKW	PKL	L	GF	GA	GD	Pts
1	Detroit Dynamite	16	12	2	0	2	45	24	+21	38 (Note: Detroit was penalized 2 points.)
2	Mid-Michigan Bucks	16	11	0	1	4	38	19	+19	33
3	Kalamazoo Kingdom	16	7	0	1	8	30	34	−4	21
4	Fox River Rebels	16	6	0	0	10	30	37	−7	18
5	Indiana Invaders	16	6	1	0	9	26	33	−7	19 (Note: Indiana was penalized 1 point.)
6	Lansing Locomotive	16	3	0	0	13	36	42	−6	6 (Note: Lansing was penalized 3 points.)
7	Grand Rapids Explosion	16	0	0	0	16	6	56	−50	0

Source: RSSSF

=== Northwest Division ===
Pos	Team	Pld	W	PKW	PKL	L	GF	GA	GD	Pts
1	Spokane Shadow	16	13	0	0	3	62	15	+47	39
2	Yakima Reds	16	9	0	0	7	40	28	+12	27
3	Seattle BigFoot	16	8	3	0	5	28	32	−4	27 (Note: Seattle BigFoot was penalized 3 points.)
4	Cascade Surge	16	7	2	2	5	28	28	0	23 (Note: Cascade was penalized 2 points.)
5	Seattle Hibernian (Note: Abbotsford, Okanagan Valley, Seattle Hibernian, and Victoria are all associate members and do not play a full schedule.)	8	2	0	1	5	5	16	−11	6
6	Okanagan Valley Challenge	8	2	0	1	5	6	23	−17	6
7	Victoria Umbro Select	8	1	0	2	5	11	19	−8	3
8	Abbotsford Athletes In Action	8	0	1	0	7	9	28	−19	1 (Note: Abbotsford was penalized 1 point.)

Source: RSSSF

=== Southeast Division ===
Pos	Team	Pld	W	PKW	PKL	L	GF	GA	GD	Pts
1	Jackson Chargers (R)	16	16	0	0	0	104	17	+87	48
2	Cocoa Expos	16	9	0	0	7	41	36	+5	27
3	Bradenton Academics	16	8	1	0	7	50	42	+8	25 (Note: Bradenton, Central Florida, and South Florida were all penalized 1 point.)
4	Alabama Saints	16	7	0	3	6	40	48	−8	21
5	Miami Tango	16	6	1	0	9	41	39	+2	19 (Note: Miami was penalized 1 point.)
6	Central Florida Lionhearts	16	5	1	0	10	40	55	−15	16
7	South Florida Future	16	4	1	1	10	28	79	−51	13

Source: RSSSF
(R) Regular Season Champions

=== Southwest Division ===
Pos	Team	Pld	W	PKW	PKL	L	GF	GA	GD	Pts
1	Silicon Valley Ambassadors	16	14	1	0	1	44	20	+24	43 (Note: Northern Arizona, San Gabriel Valley, and Silicon Valley were all penalized 1 point.)
2	San Gabriel Valley Highlanders	16	10	1	0	5	45	27	+18	31
3	Southern California Chivas	16	7	0	1	8	30	26	+4	21
4	Central Coast Roadrunners	16	5	0	0	11	31	39	−8	15
5	Northern Arizona Prospectors	16	1	1	1	13	23	66	−43	4

Source: RSSSF

== Playoffs ==
=== Format ===
Kalamazoo hosted the Finals and received a bye to the National Semi-Finals.
The top four teams from the Central, Great Lakes, Southeast, and Southwest divisions, however, if Kalamazoo places in the top four in the Central Division, the fifth place team will take their spot. The top two teams in the Northwest Division will play the top two associate teams from the PCSL. The team with the most points to lose in the Divisional rounds will play in the Regional round as a wild card against the Divisional champion with the most points. The remaining four teams will play each other based on geography.

=== Divisional brackets ===
Southeast Semifinals
SE1	(Mississippi) Jackson Chargers	7
SE4	(Florida) Miami Tango	0
SE2	(Florida) Cocoa Expos	4
SE3	(Florida) Bradenton Academics	3

Southeast Finals
SE1	(Mississippi) Jackson Chargers	8
SE2	(Florida) Cocoa Expos	2

Southeast Division Playoffs
July 31, 1998
Semifinals

(Florida) Cocoa Expos	4–3	(Florida) Bradenton Academics
Eddie Enders 7', 84'; Fitzgerald Haig 42', 90' (pen.)	Report

The Sports Club
Jackson, Mississippi
July 31, 1998
6:00 PM
Semifinals

(Mississippi) Jackson Chargers	7–0	(Florida) Miami Tango
Johnny Mulrooney; Bonaventure Maruti; Dominic Schell; Eric Bushey; Jeremy Short; Sanjeev Parmar	Report

The Sports Club
Jackson, Mississippi

August 1, 1998
7:45 PM
Southeast Division Final

(Mississippi) Jackson Chargers	8–2	(Florida) Cocoa Expos
Dominic Schell 10'; Bonaventure Maruti 17'; Paul Oyuga; Sheldon Bennett	Report	Eddie Enders; (pen.) Fitzgerald Haig

The Sports Club
Jackson, Mississippi

Southwest Semifinals
SW1	(California) Silicon Valley Ambassadors	1
SW4	(California) Central Coast Roadrunners (AET)	2
SW2	(California) San Gabriel Valley Highlanders	2
SW3	Southern California Chivas	0

Southwest Finals
SW4	(California) Central Coast Roadrunners	2
SW2	(California) San Gabriel Valley Highlanders	4

Southwest Division Playoffs
July 31, 1998
5:30 PM PDT
Semifinals

(California) Silicon Valley Ambassadors	1–2 (OT) (a.e.t.)	(California) Central Coast Roadrunners
Niels Bruckner (red card) 75'; 83' (o.g.)	Report 1 Report 2	81' 93' Clay Harty

De Anza College
Cupertino, California
July 31, 1998
Semifinals

(California) San Gabriel Valley Highlanders	2–0	Southern California Chivas

De Anza College
Cupertino, California

August 2, 1998
Southwest Division Final

(California) San Gabriel Valley Highlanders	4–2	(California) Central Coast Roadrunners
Zhorzhik Sepanyan; Arutyun Krtotyan; Sarkis Banyan (red card); Sevak Atamyan	Report 1 Report 2	Mike Rosander; (red card) Abel Gutierrez; 80' Clay Harty

Saddleback High School
Santa Ana, California

Northwest Semifinals
NW1	(Washington (state)) Spokane Shadow	1
NWA2	(British Columbia) Okanagan Valley Challenge	2
NW2	(Washington (state)) Yakima Reds	1
NWA1	(Washington (state)) Seattle BigFoot	0

Northwest Finals
NWA2	(British Columbia) Okanagan Valley Challenge	1
NW2	(Washington (state)) Yakima Reds	4

Northwest Division Playoffs
August 1, 1998
6:00 PM
Semifinals

(Washington (state)) Spokane Shadow	1–2	(British Columbia) Okanagan Valley Challenge
Joe Marks 66'		(16:15) Eric Ladner; 27' (o.g.) Alex Atherton

Joe Albi Stadium
Spokane, Washington
August 1, 1998
8:00 PM
Semifinals

(Washington (state)) Yakima Reds	1–0	(Washington (state)) Seattle BigFoot
Jeff Perry (58:40)

Joe Albi Stadium
Spokane, Washington

August 2, 1998
6:00 PM
Northwest Division Final

(Washington (state)) Yakima Reds	4–1	(British Columbia) Okanagan Valley Challenge
Luiz Machado 14', 17'; Nilton Resende 54'; Danny Ferris 82'	Report	85' Grame Magowan

Joe Albi Stadium
Spokane, Washington

Central Semifinals
C1	Colorado Comets	0
C4	(Missouri) Kansas City Brass	1
C2	(Iowa) Des Moines Menace (AET)	2
C3	(Minnesota) Twin Cities Tornado	1

Central Finals
C4	(Missouri) Kansas City Brass	2 (0)
C2	(Iowa) Des Moines Menace (AET/PSO)	2 (1)

Central Division Playoffs
July 31, 1998
6:00 PM
Semifinals

Colorado Comets	0–1	(Missouri) Kansas City Brass
	Report	29' Kelly Klusman

Cara McGrane Memorial Stadium
Des Moines, Iowa
July 31, 1998
8:00 PM
Semifinals

(Iowa) Des Moines Menace	2–1 (OT)	(Minnesota) Twin Cities Tornado
Alf Bilbao 70'; Seth Modersohn 94' (pen.)	Report

Cara McGrane Memorial Stadium
Des Moines, Iowa

August 1, 1998
7:00 PM
Central Division Final

(Iowa) Des Moines Menace	2–2 (a.e.t.)	(Missouri) Kansas City Brass
Seth Modersohn 70'; Eric Wilson		67' Jeff Kinsman
Penalties
Jon Malm (penalty scored)	3–2	Penalty scored Penalty missed

Cara McGrane Memorial Stadium
Des Moines, Iowa

Great Lakes Semifinals
GL1	(Michigan) Detroit Dynamite	3
GL4	(Wisconsin) Fox River Rebels	2
GL2	Mid-Michigan Bucks	3
GL3	Indiana Invaders	0

Great Lakes Finals
GL1	(Michigan) Detroit Dynamite	0
GL2	Mid-Michigan Bucks	2

Great Lakes Division Playoffs
July 31, 1998
7:00 PM
Semifinals

Mid-Michigan Bucks	3–0	Indiana Invaders
Chad Schomaker (44:55); Joe Malachino 59'; Stephen Armstrong 70'

White Pine Stadium
Saginaw Township, Michigan
July 31, 1998
Semifinals

(Michigan) Detroit Dynamite	3–2	(Wisconsin) Fox River Rebels
	Report	Joe Bernstein; Ran Rajec

White Pine Stadium
Saginaw Township, Michigan

August 1, 1998
Great Lakes Division Final

Mid-Michigan Bucks	2–0	(Michigan) Detroit Dynamite
Benjamin Djeukeng 7'; Chad Schomaker

White Pine Stadium
Saginaw Township, Michigan

=== Round of Six ===
Region A
GL2	Mid-Michigan Bucks	2
WC	(Mississippi) Jackson Chargers	3

Region B
SW2	(California) San Gabriel Valley Highlanders	4
NW2	(Washington (state)) Yakima Reds	2

Region C
C2	(Iowa) Des Moines Menace	3
SE2	(Florida) Cocoa Expos	1

PDSL Regional Finals
August 8, 1998

(Mississippi) Jackson Chargers	3–2	Mid-Michigan Bucks
Johnny Mulrooney 5', 31'; Dominic Schell 32'	Report	8', 52' Stephen Armstrong

The Sports Club
Jackson, Mississippi
August 8, 1998

(Iowa) Des Moines Menace	3–1	(Florida) Cocoa Expos
Eric Wilson 18'; Seth Modersohn 52', 65'	Report	5' Eddie Enders

Cara McGrane Memorial Stadium
Des Moines, Iowa
Attendance: 532
August 8, 1998

(California) San Gabriel Valley Highlanders	4–2	(Washington (state)) Yakima Reds
Goal		11'; 90'

Pasadena High School, Pasadena, California

=== PDSL finals bracket ===
PDL Semifinals
WC	(Mississippi) Jackson Chargers	2
H	(Michigan) Kalamazoo Kingdom	0
SW2	(California) San Gabriel Valley Highlanders	3
C2	(Iowa) Des Moines Menace	1

PDL Finals
WC	(Mississippi) Jackson Chargers	2
SW2	(California) San Gabriel Valley Highlanders	3
PDL Third Place
H	(Michigan) Kalamazoo Kingdom	1
C2	(Iowa) Des Moines Menace	4

PDL National Semifinals
August 14, 1998
6:00 PM

(California) San Gabriel Valley Highlanders	3–1	(Iowa) Des Moines Menace
Serejah Akopian 27'; Sarkis Banyan 40'; Vahe Asatourian 69'	Report	72' Brian Zwaschka

Ed Annen Sports Complex
Kalamazoo, Michigan
August 14, 1998
8:00 PM

(Michigan) Kalamazoo Kingdom	0–2	(Mississippi) Jackson Chargers
	Report	25' Bonaventure Maruti; 43' (o.g.) Jeremy Shortt

Ed Annen Sports Complex
Kalamazoo, Michigan
Attendance: 3,217

Third Place Game
August 15, 1998
5:30 PM

(Michigan) Kalamazoo Kingdom	1–4	(Iowa) Des Moines Menace
Ryan Thompson 89'	Report	26' Eric Wilson; 67' Luc Cisna; 71' Kyle Reilly; 77' Matt Pinkney

Ed Annen Sports Complex
Kalamazoo, Michigan

PDL Championship Game
August 15, 1998
7:30 PM

(Mississippi) Jackson Chargers	2–3	(California) San Gabriel Valley Highlanders
Bonaventure Maruti 5', 71'	Report	Vahe Asatourian 39'; Sereja Akopian 49'; Arshak Abyanli 80'

Ed Annen Sports Complex
Kalamazoo, Michigan

Championship MVP: (Armenia) Arshak Abyanli (SGV)

== Honors ==
- Organization of the Year: Jackson Chargers
- Executive of the Year: Dave Nesbit, Des Moines Menace
- Fair Play Award: Spokane Shadow
