= Tim Hanley =

American soccer coach and former player (born 1960)

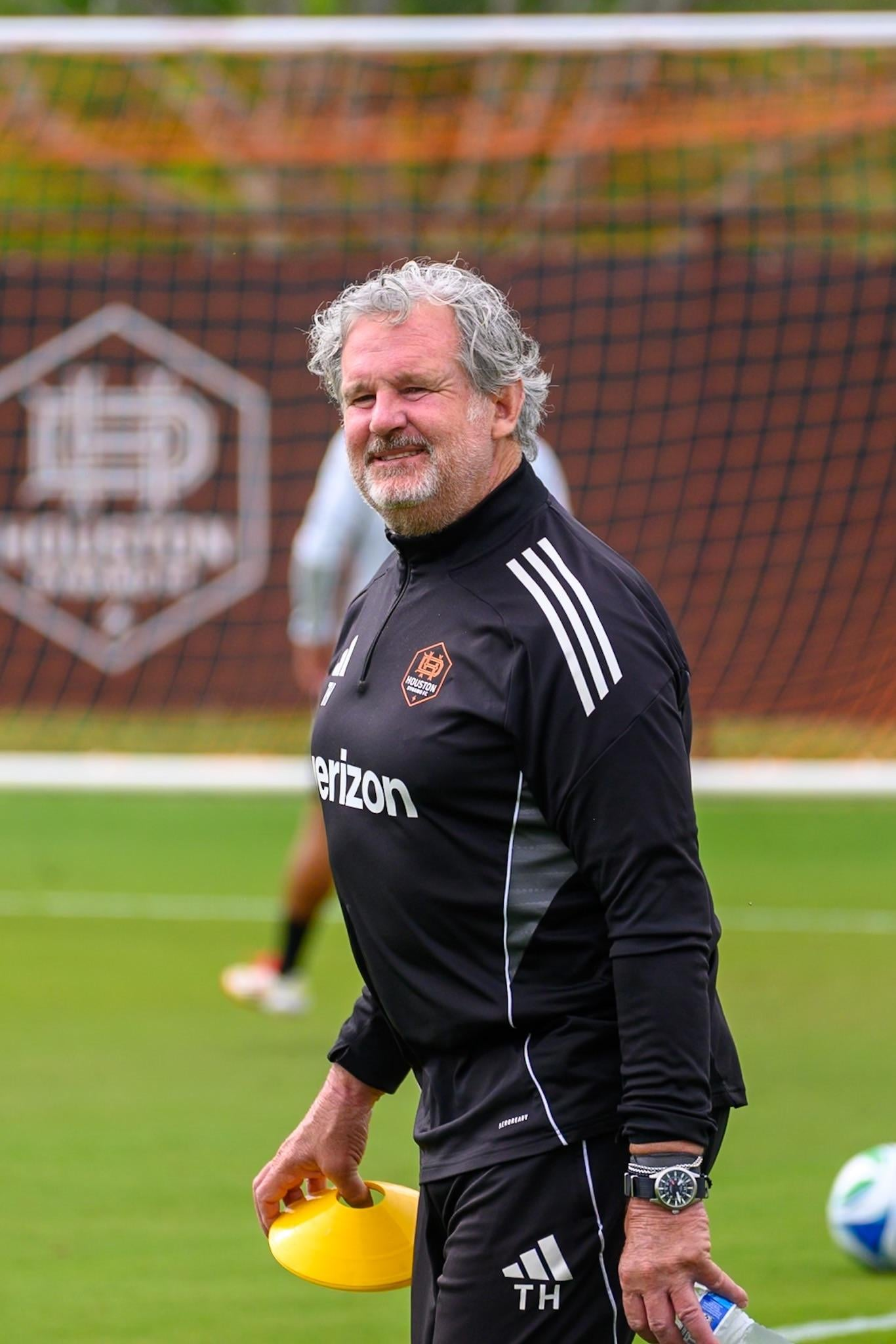
- Hanley in 2025

Personal information
- Full name: Tim Hanley
- Date of birth: March 27, 1960 (age 66)
- Place of birth: Palo Alto, California, United States
- Position: Goalkeeper

Team information
- Current team: Houston Dynamo (assistant)

College career
Years	Team	Apps	(Gls)
1979–1980	Foothill College		

Senior career*
Years	Team	Apps	(Gls)
1980–1981	Tampa Bay Rowdies (indoor)	5	(0)
1981	Tampa Bay Rowdies	0	(0)
1981	San Jose Earthquakes		
1982	Hibernian		
1983–1984	San Jose Earthquakes (indoor)		
1985	Servette		

Managerial career
- California Jaguars (assistant)
- 1997–1999: San Jose Earthquakes (assistant)
- 1998: Silicon Valley Ambassadors (assistant)
- 2001–2005: San Jose Earthquakes (assistant)
- 2002–2005: Stanford University (assistant)
- 2006–2007: Houston Dynamo (assistant)
- 2007: Los Angeles Galaxy (assistant)
- 2009–2014: Houston Dynamo (assistant)
- 2014–2017: San Jose Earthquakes (assistant)
- 2018: Philadelphia Union (assistant)
- 2020–2022: Columbus Crew (assistant)
- 2023–: Houston Dynamo (assistant)
- * Club domestic league appearances and goals

Tim Hanley (born March 27, 1960) is an American soccer coach and former player who currently serves as an assistant coach for Houston Dynamo FC. During his playing career, he played in the North American Soccer League and Europe.

== Player ==
=== Youth ===
Hanley grew up in Los Altos, California, and began playing soccer in 1974. He was fourteen at the time. In his words, "I played one half in the field, hated it and moved into nets until I retired from the professional ranks ten years later." Hanley graduated from Los Altos High School in 1978 and entered Foothill College, a two-year community college in Los Altos Hills. Although a junior college, Foothill, at the time boasted one of the best college teams in California. In 1980, he trained briefly with Blackburn F.C., playing one reserve game, and with Blackpool F.C. After the fall 1980 collegiate season, Hanley decided against transferring to an NCAA college in favor of turning professional.

=== Professional ===
When Hanley turned professional, he had several options. The San Francisco Fog of Major Indoor Soccer League and the Golden Gate Gales of the American Soccer League both drafted him. However, he signed with the Tampa Bay Rowdies for the 1980–81 NASL Indoor season. In 1981, San Jose Earthquakes starting goalkeeper Mike Hewitt broke his thumb. The team quickly moved to sign Hanley as a backup, but he ended up playing several games during the 1981 season. In 1982, he moved to Hibernian F.C. of the Scottish Football League. At the time, American players found it nearly impossible to gain contracts with European teams. As a result, Hanley played for Hibernian "on trial". The team paid for his lodging, meals and provided him with a small cash salary. In 1983, he returned to the Earthquakes where he played the last two seasons of the NASL. Following the collapse of the league in 1984, he moved to Servette F.C. in the Swiss First Division. Once again, he found himself paid on a cash basis without a contract. With a wife to support, he elected to retire from playing professionally and turn to coaching. Former NFL-great John Brodie was his father-in-law.

== Coach ==
In 1985, Hanley began his career as a goalkeeper coach. He served in that capacity in the A-League and Premier Development League for teams including the, California Jaguars and Silicon Valley Ambassadors. In 1997, Hanley was hired as the goalkeeper coach for the San Jose Clash of Major League Soccer. He remained with the team every year, except 2000, through its name change in 1999 to the San Jose Earthquakes and its move in 2006 to Houston where it became the Houston Dynamo. In July 2006, he left the Houston Dynamo to move to the Los Angeles Galaxy. He was released from the team in August 2007. In 2002, Stanford University hired Hanley as the goalkeeper coach for its men's soccer team. He has also held positions with several northern Californian youth clubs such as: The Stanford Quake and Palo Alto Blue 93. Hanley was re-hired by the Dynamo as the goalkeeper coach at the beginning of the 2009 season. He rejoined San Jose for the 2014 season and stayed until he was let go by the club on 20 November 2017. He was the goalkeeper coach in 2018 for Philadelphia Union.
