= Rodrigo Costa (footballer, born 1976) =

Brazilian footballer

Personal information
- Date of birth: August 30, 1976 (age 50)
- Place of birth: São Paulo, Brazil
- Height: 5 ft 11 in (1.80 m)
- Position: Forward

Youth career
- 1995–1998: Union College

Senior career*
Years	Team	Apps	(Gls)
1997–1998	Detroit Dynamite		
1999	Mid Michigan Bucks	15	(11)
2000	Chicago Sockers	19	(9)
2001–2004	Indiana Blast	69	(29)
- * Club domestic league appearances and goals

Rodrigo Costa is a former Brazilian association football forward who played professionally in the United States.

Costa attended Union College where he was a 1996, 1997 and 1998 NAIA Honorable Mention All American soccer player. He holds the Union College record for career goals. During the 1997 and 1998 collegiate off-seasons, Costa played for the Detroit Dynamite of the Premier Development Soccer League. In 1997, he led the league in scoring en route to earning Rookie of the Year. In 1998, he was the PDSL MVP. In 1999, Costa moved to the Mid Michigan Bucks for one season. In 2000, he played for the Chicago Sockers. That season, the Sockers won the league title by defeating the Mid Michigan Bucks, 1–0, in the championship game on a goal by Costa. On January 18, 2001, Costa signed with the Indiana Blast of the USL A-League. He played four seasons with Indiana.
