= Andy McDermott (soccer, born 1976) =

American soccer player

Personal information
- Full name: Andrew Robb McDermott
- Date of birth: February 4, 1976 (age 50)
- Place of birth: Palatine, Illinois, U.S.
- Height: 6 ft 0 in (1.83 m)
- Position: Midfielder

Youth career
- 1994–1997: Northwestern Wildcats

Senior career*
Years	Team	Apps	(Gls)
1998–1999	Chicago Sockers	24	(2)
2000–2001	Indiana Blast	44	(9)
2002–2003	Charlotte Eagles	51	(9)
Total		119	(20)
- * Club domestic league appearances and goals

Andy McDermott is an American retired soccer midfielder who played professionally in the USL A-League before becoming an actor, writer, and sports entertainment executive. McDermott has also coached at several different levels for more than 30 years. He has coached Varsity High School, college at Northwestern University, and was Sporting Director for a club in development in the East Bay of San Francisco. At the club level, he was the Director of Coaching at the Solano United Soccer Club (now Surf) in Northern California and is the executive director of Palatine Celtic in the Chicago area. He earned his National A-Youth Coaching License from US Soccer in 2019, and the Club Technical Leadership, Level Two License in 2024.

In 1994, McDermott graduated from William Fremd High School. He played collegiate soccer at Northwestern University from 1994 to 1997. As a soccer player, he was named All Big-Ten three years, Team Captain three years, and finished as the all-time assist record holder and NSCAA All-American Midwest Region. In 1998, McDermott signed with the Chicago Stingers of the USISL D-3 Pro League. The Stingers won the 1998 league championship. In 1999, the Stingers renamed themselves the Chicago Sockers and moved down to the USL Premier Development League. Chicago again won the league title, as McDermott scored a goal in the 3–1 victory over the Spokane Shadow. In February 2000, McDermott moved up to the Indiana Blast of the USL A-League. In 2002 and 2003, he served as Team Captain of the A-League side the Charlotte Eagles in North Carolina.

While playing seven seasons of professional soccer in Germany, Chicago, Indianapolis, and Charlotte, Andy spent his down time training in the martial arts, earning his Third-Degree Black Belt and was the Head Instructor of a taekwondo school. After 9/11, he served on the Tactical Response Unit of the Phoenix Police Department for 9 years. Besides tactical operations and pro-active community policing, he also served as a certified translator in Spanish and in French, a Peer Counselor for PTSD and other trauma, and as Subject Matter Expert and Physical Training Instructor for all Arizona Law Enforcement Agencies. While there, he competed in the World Police and Fire Games and in 2012 he won the gold medal at the National Championships in the event called Toughest Competitor Alive.

While working as a cop in Phoenix, he was discovered as an acting talent when the feature film "Everything Must Go" (starring Will Ferrell) was filmed in Scottsdale. He generated enough interest to launch his career into Los Angeles, where over five years he appeared in over 40 National film and television productions, 15 commercials, and many print campaigns. He continues to act while living in Chicago, appearing in several films and TV shows, including Chicago Med, Mosquito Coast, and Rescue: Hawaii Surf. The globally-successful video game Call Of Duty: Black Ops 3 featured McDermott on the cover and in the game's artwork. . He became known as a Sports Performance and Fitness Expert- with over 100 published articles and videos for national media including Men’s Fitness, Muscle & Fitness, and USA Today, among others. His training and nutrition content on YouTube has been viewed by 4.5 million people.

In 2017, McDermott relocated to the San Francisco area when he was recruited to create and lead a $50MM Sports Technology and Entertainment startup, called COPA Soccer Training Center.

He and Julie were married in 1999, and along with their four kids and dog, they have returned to the Chicago area after 20 years of adventures to create and lead Intentional Sports.
