= Joe Malachino =

American soccer player and coach

Personal information
- Place of birth: Michigan, U.S.
- Position: Forward

Senior career*
Years	Team	Apps	(Gls)
1995–2001	Detroit Rockers (indoor)	218	(74)
1997	Mid-Michigan Bucks		(4)
1998	Cincinnati Riverhawks	17	(2)
2000–2001	Mid-Michigan Bucks	12	(1)
2005	Windsor Border Stars	8	(0)

Managerial career
- 2000–2001: Mid-Michigan Bucks(player/coach)
- 2008–: Eastern Michigan Eagles (assistant coach)
- * Club domestic league appearances and goals

Joe Malachino is an American former soccer player and currently Eastern Michigan Eagles assistant coach. He played in the National Professional Soccer League, USL A-League, USL Premier Development League, and Canadian Professional Soccer League.

== Playing career ==
Malachino began his professional career in 1995 in the National Professional Soccer League with Detroit Rockers. During his six-year tenure with Detroit he appeared in 218 matches, and recorded 74 goals. During the summer seasons he signed with Mid-Michigan Bucks in 1997. In 1997, he signed with Cincinnati Riverhawks of the USL A-League, where he appeared in 17 matches and scored two goals. In 2000, he returned to the Michigan Bucks to serve in a player/coach capacity. During his second stint with the Bucks he made history by leading the organization to its first regular season championship. He led the Bucks to playoff finals, but lost to Chicago Sockers by a score of 1–0. For his accomplishments the league awarded him the PDL Coach of the year award. In 2005, he signed with Windsor Border Stars of the Canadian Professional Soccer League. He helped Windsor capture the AISL Championship during the indoor season.
