= T. J. Gore =

American soccer player (born 1987)

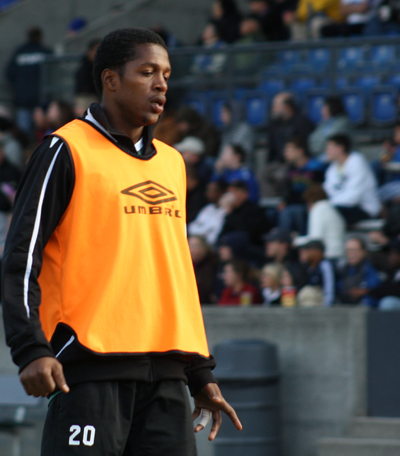

Personal information
- Full name: Timothy Gore
- Date of birth: September 7, 1987 (age 39)
- Place of birth: Macomb, Michigan, United States
- Height: 6 ft 0 in (1.83 m)
- Positions: Midfielder; forward

Youth career
- 2006–2009: Vermont Catamounts

Senior career*
Years	Team	Apps	(Gls)
2009	Michigan Bucks	12	(1)
2010–2011	Rochester Rhinos	27	(0)
- * Club domestic league appearances and goals as of August 29, 2013

Timothy "T. J." Gore (born September 7, 1987, in Macomb, Michigan) is an American soccer player.

== Career ==
=== College and amateur ===
Gore attended De La Salle Collegiate High School in Warren, Michigan, for 2 years before transferring to Dakota High School in Macomb, a suburb of Detroit, Michigan, where he named to the All-State Team his senior season and was a finalist for Michigan's Gatorade High School Player of the Year, and played club soccer for the Vardar club, who he helped lead to the Michigan and Midwest Championships in 2005.

He played four years of college soccer at the University of Vermont, where he was hailed as one of the best forwards in the America East conference, earning a spot on the all-conference first team as a freshman in 2006. He was named to the America East All-Conference Second Team in 2007, was an all-league selection for the third straight year after being named to the America East All-Conference Second Team as a junior in 2008, and finished his collegiate career with 10 goals and 13 assists in 74 games for the Catamounts.

During his college years he also played for Michigan Bucks in the USL Premier Development League.

=== Professional ===
Gore turned professional in 2010 when he signed with the Rochester Rhinos. He made his professional debut on April 25, 2010, in a game against the Austin Aztex.

== Honors ==
=== Rochester Rhinos ===
- USSF Division 2 Pro League Regular Season Champions (1): 2010
