= Victoria Umbro Select =

Canadian soccer team

- Full name: Victoria Umbro Select
- League: Premier Development Soccer League
- 1998: 7th, Northwest Division

Victoria Umbro Select was a Canadian soccer team who played in the Premier Development Soccer League as an associate member in the 1998 season.

== History ==
Victoria Umbro Select had been a member of the Pacific Coast Soccer League. In 1998, they joined the Premier Development Soccer League as an associate member, along with Abbotsford Athletes In Action, Okanagan Valley Challenge and Seattle Hibernian, each of whom played 8 league games, while the full league members played 16. In their 8 games, Victoria finished with only one victory, along with two shootout losses and five regulation losses.

== Year-by-year ==
Year	League	Reg. season	Playoffs	Ref
1998	PDSL	7th, Northwest	Did not qualify	
