= Northern Arizona Prospectors =

- Full name: Northern Arizona Prospectors
- Founded: 1998
- Ground: Bradshaw Mountain HS Stadium
- League: USL Premier Development League
- 1998: 5th, Southwest Division

The Northern Arizona Prospectors were an American soccer team, founded in 1998. The team was a member of the United Soccer Leagues Premier Development League (PDL), the fourth tier of the American Soccer Pyramid. They only lasted that season, and folded shortly thereafter.

The Rebels played their home games at Bradshaw Mountain High School in the city of Prescott Valley, Arizona, 55 miles south of Flagstaff, Arizona.

== Year-by-year ==
| Year | Division | League | Reg. season | Playoffs | Open Cup |
|---|---|---|---|---|---|
| 1998 | 4 | USL PDL | 5th, Southwest Division | Did not qualify | Did not qualify |
