= Alexander Vargas =

Cuban baseball player (born 2001)

Free agent
- Infielder
- Born: October 29, 2001 (age 24); Matanzas, Cuba
- Bats: Switch Throws: Right

Alexander Vargas (born October 29, 2001) is a Cuban professional baseball infielder who is a free agent. He was named to the Cuba national baseball team for the 2026 World Baseball Classic.

== Career ==
Vargas was signed as an international free agent by the New York Yankees in 2018 to a $2.5 million signing bonus. In 2020, he was the No. 20 ranked prospect in all of baseball according to MLB Pipeline. Vargas was promoted to the Double-A Somerset Patriots for the 2024 season where he hit .254/.375/.668.

In August 2025, Vargas was released by the Yankees. He signed a minor league contract with the Cincinnati Reds later that month and was assigned to the High-A Dayton Dragons. In 18 games with Dayton in 2025, Vargas hit .242/.323/.617.

Vargas was assigned to the Double-A Chattanooga Lookouts to begin the 2026 season, where he batted .339/.383/.393 with eight RBI and two stolen bases across 16 appearances. On April 28, 2026, Vargas was released by the Reds organization.
