= Miami Tango =

- Full name: Miami Tango Soccer Club
- Nickname: Tango
- Founded: 1980

The Miami Tango Soccer Club is an American soccer team from Miami, Florida. Founded in 1980.

Miami Tango SC played Florida Soccer League since 1980.

They joined the USISL PDSL in 1996, in 1998 1998 PDSL seasonUSISL PDSL replacing the Miami Breakers, who had been promoted to the D-3 Pro League. For the 1999 season, USISL PDSL the team played simultaneously with the Breakers, who had been relegated after one season. (2000) When it became apparent that there was not a market for two PDL teams in the area and the Breakers were going to stay, in 2001 the Miami Tango SC returned to Miami Soccer League.

Since 2001 the team continues to play in the Miami Soccer League, a Florida State Soccer Association member. In 2004 Miami Tango SC won the Florida States Soccer Association Cup.

== Year-by-year ==
Year	Division	League	Reg. season	Playoffs	Open Cup
1996	4	PDSL	4th, Southeast	Division Semifinals	Did not qualify
1998	4	PDSL	4th, Southeast	Division Semifinals	Did not qualify
1999	4	USL PDL	7th, Southeast	Did not qualify	Did not qualify
