= Flint City Bucks =

Semi-professional soccer team in Flint, Michigan, U.S.

- Full name: Flint City Bucks
- Nickname: Bucks
- Founded: 1995; 31 years ago (as Mid-Michigan Bucks)
- Stadium: Atwood Stadium; Flint, Michigan
- Capacity: 11,000
- CEO & Chairman: Dan Duggan
- Head coach: Paul Doroh
- League: USL League Two
- 2024: Great Lakes Division: 1st Playoffs: Conference Finals
- Website: flintcitybucks.com
Home colors

Flint City Bucks is an American soccer team based in Flint, Michigan, United States. Founded in 1995, the team plays in USL League Two.

The club was founded in 1995 as the Mid-Michigan Bucks, playing in Saginaw, and began playing in 1996. In 2004, the club changed its name to the Michigan Bucks following a move to Plymouth. In 2008, they moved to Pontiac. In 2019, they moved to Flint and changed their name to the current Flint City Bucks.

Starting in 2019, they began playing their home matches at Atwood Stadium. From 2008 through 2018, the team played its home matches at the soccer-specific Ultimate Soccer Arenas, one of the few teams to play regularly on a full-size indoor soccer field.

Throughout their existence, the Bucks have been one of the most successful amateur soccer teams in the United States, qualifying for eleven U.S. Open Cups, winning eleven divisional championships, and four national titles—the first team to reach that mark in USL League Two. In 2000, the Bucks became the first USL League Two (then known as the Premier Development League) team to defeat an MLS team in the US Open Cup when they beat the New England Revolution at Foxboro Stadium. They won their first PDL championship in 2006, defeating the Laredo Heat 2–1. They defeated the Kitsap Pumas 1–0 at Ultimate Soccer Arenas to win the 2014 PDL championship. In 2016, they defeated the Calgary Foothills FC 3–2.

On August 3, 2019, the Flint City Bucks defeated Reading United AC for their fourth national championship in their inaugural season at Flint's historic Atwood Stadium.

== History ==
The Bucks organization entered the competitive soccer landscape in 1996, competing in the USISL Premier League. Almost immediately, the Mid-Michigan Bucks were a competitive outfit. They finished third in the Central Northern division in their debut year, making it all the way to the final Premier Six tournament, and despite being beaten by the San Francisco Bay Seals and eventual national champions Central Coast Roadrunners, they nevertheless set themselves up to be a successful team in years to come.

The Bucks won their first divisional title in 1997, eight points clear of second place Detroit Dynamite with 12 wins on the season. They made it to the national semi-finals, beating Grand Rapids Explosion, Kalamazoo Kingdom and Des Moines Menace before eventually falling 2–0 to the Central Coast Roadrunners in the final four. The Bucks also made their debut in the US Open Cup with a 3–2 victory over USISL D3 Pro League side Wilmington Hammerheads, before losing to the A-League's Rochester Ragin' Rhinos in the second round. At the end of the season, Steve Burns was named PDSL Coach of the Year.

The Bucks finished second to Detroit Dynamite in 1998 with a 11–5–1 record, and again made the regional finals, losing 3–2 to finalists Jackson Chargers after victories over Indiana Invaders and the Dynamite in the divisional playoffs. The Bucks won the Great Lakes division of the newly renamed PDL in 1999, but lost 2–1 to Sioux City Breeze in the Conference Semifinals. They also reached the third round of the US Open Cup, after defeating the Austin Lone Stars and Minnesota Thunder, but were eliminated by the Tampa Bay Mutiny of the MLS.

In 2000, the Bucks took their second PDL Great Lakes title in a row and their third overall, finishing 27 points clear of second-place Dayton Gems. The Bucks received a bye to the national playoff semi-finals, and secured their first ever championship game berth with a 5–2 win over Yakima Reds. The Bucks were beaten in the final by the Chicago Sockers. The Bucks also made it to the third round of the US Open Cup in 2000. They won 3–0 over Maryland-based amateur side Jerry D's, and defeated MLS's New England Revolution 1–0, with Chad Schomaker scoring the winning goal in the 90th minute, before losing their next game on penalty kicks to Miami Fusion after a 3–3 draw in regulation time. Head coach Joe Malachino was named PDL coach of the year, the second Bucks coach to receive the honor.

The Bucks missed the playoffs for the first time in 2001, beaten into third place in the Great Lakes Division by Chicago Fire Reserves and West Michigan Edge, but did manage to progress to the second round of the US Open Cup for the third year in a row, knocking out amateur side Chaldean Arsenal before losing to the New England Revolution 7–1. The Bucks finished in second place behind the Chicago Fire Reserves again in 2002. In the playoffs, they progressed to the Conference Final, where they lost on penalties to eventual national runners-up Boulder Rapids Reserve.

In 2003 there was a coaching change, as former San Jose Clash star Dario Brose was replaced by Don Gemmell. The Bucks began the year with a five-game unbeaten streak, and continued on through the month of June with five wins in six games. The Bucks secured their fourth divisional title, but fell in the conference final game to the Chicago Fire Reserves. In the US Open Cup, the Bucks beat USL Pro Select League Long Island Rough Riders, before losing 4–0 to the New York/New Jersey Metrostars in Round 3.

In 2004, the Mid-Michigan Bucks became the Michigan Bucks, coinciding with their permanent move from Saginaw to metro-Detroit and a new logo. They opened the season with two five-goal victories over Indiana Invaders and West Michigan Edge, and went on to lose only three regular season games all year. The Bucks' trip to the playoffs ended with a 3–2 defeat to Boulder Rapids Reserve in the first game. Knox Cameron was the Bucks' most prolific striker, scoring 15 goals for the season, including 2 hat tricks.

Paul Snape, who had played for the team for many years, was appointed head coach in 2005, but the first few games of his tenure were rocky: three consecutive wins were followed by a four-game winless streak. The Bucks would turn things around with ten consecutive wins from mid June to the end of the season. Dube and Ryan McMahen netted 18 goals between them on the way to the playoffs, while Kevin Taylor was named PDL Defender of the Year. The Bucks stuttered in the playoffs, this time losing the Conference final to eventual national champions Des Moines Menace.

In 2006, Dan Fitzgerald replaced Paul Snape as head coach. Four wins in their opening four games took the Bucks back to the US Open Cup after a 2-year break, and once again they upset higher-league opponents, beating Pittsburgh Riverhounds 2–0 in round 1, and overcoming Cincinnati Kings in Round 2, before eventually going down 4–1 to Major League Soccer's Columbus Crew in the third round. The Bucks suffered a drop in form, losing three of four games, including a 0–3 loss away at the Indiana Invaders, but enjoyed a four-game unbeaten run at the end of the season including a 6–1 win over West Michigan Edge in the final regular season match. In the playoffs, they defeated Colorado Rapids U23's 4–1 in the semi-finals, and Chicago Fire Premier 4-0 to take the Conference title with Nate Jafta scoring a hat trick, and reached their first PDL championship game by overcoming Western Conference champions Orange County Blue Star with two goals from Kenny Uzoigwe. The Bucks defeated Laredo Heat 2–1 with goals from Kenny Uzoigwe and Ty Shipalane to take their first ever national championship, after 11 years of play.

As reigning PDL champions, the Bucks started 2007 in good form with an 11-game unbeaten run, with only three draws. In the US Open Cup, they lost 4–2 to Richmond Kickers in the first round. The Bucks finished the regular season by winning their sixth divisional title. After defeating the St. Louis Lions in the playoff semi-final, the Bucks retained their Conference title with a 3–0 win over Chicago Fire Premier, returning to the national stage for a second consecutive year. A penalty shootout victory over Brooklyn Knights after a 1–1 tie in the semi-finals sent the Bucks to the Championship game for the second consecutive year where they once again played against Southern Conference champions Laredo Heat. The game stood at 0–0 after extra time. During the penalty shootout striker Kenny Uzoigwe suffered leg cramps and was unable to take his spot kick, and had to be substituted. His replacement, Ian Daniel, had his kick saved by Laredo goalkeeper Ryan Cooper; teenager Felix Garcia then scored the winner for the Texans.

Prior to the 2008 season the Bucks moved into the brand new $17-million Ultimate Soccer Arenas in Pontiac, Michigan, making them one of the few teams to play regularly on a full-size indoor soccer field. Prior to this, the Bucks were without a regular home field for several years, and played games at numerous different venues in Michigan.

The Bucks had another successful regular season in 2008, losing only one game all year, 1–0 at home to Toronto Lynx. They received a berth in the US Open Cup for the third straight year, but fell in the first round against USL League 2 side Cleveland City Stars. The Bucks finished first, 8 points clear of Cleveland in the standings. Despite a strong regular season, they were eliminated in the first round of the playoffs by Kalamazoo Outrage, who scored an 86th-minute equalizer to force extra time, and ended the game at 3–1. Kenny Uzoigwe was the Bucks' top scorer, with 10 goals, while his partner Nate Jafta contributed 9 assists.

The Bucks reached the fourth round of the 2012 Lamar Hunt U.S. Open Cup after defeating the MLS Chicago Fire in the third round in extra time. They lost to the USL championship's Dayton Dutch Lions in the fourth round, also in extra time.

=== Logo history ===
Former logos of club

== Supporters ==
Prior to the Bucks' inaugural season in Flint, Michigan, a group of their supporters met at the Soggy Bottom Bar in Flint. At this meeting, they formed the River Rats. The River Rats have established their "curva" in section 11 of Atwood Stadium, also known as the Rats Nest.

On match days, the River Rats gather at Soggy Bottom Bar for a pre-game provocation before marching a half-mile through Carriage Town to the Atwood Stadium turnstiles.

The River Rats are a community-oriented independent supporter group that participate in LGBTQ+ advocacy, community service, and philanthropy. The River Rats are a member of the Independent Supporters Council.

== Notable former players ==
This list comprises players who went on to play professional soccer after playing for the team in the Premier Development League, or those who previously played professionally before joining the team.

- (South Africa) Stephen Armstrong
- (United States) Nate Boyden
- (United States) Eric Brunner
- (United States) Knox Cameron
- (United States) Dominic Cervi
- (United States) Steve Clark
- (United States) Nate Craft
- (United States) Doug DeMartin
- (Zimbabwe) Mkhokheli Dube
- (United States) T. J. Gore
- (United States) Adam Grinwis
- (United States) Jordan Gruber
- (United States) Sebastian Harris
- (United States) Stephen Herdsman
- (United States) Dave Hertel
- (United States) Aaron Hohlbein
- (England) Luke Holmes
- (United States) Michael Holody
- (United States) Greg Janicki
- (Canada) Noah Jensen
- (United States) George Josten
- (Zimbabwe) Joseph Kabwe
- (South Africa) Thabiso Khumalo
- (Trinidad and Tobago) Fabien Lewis
- (United States) Andy Lorei
- (United States) Steven Miller
- (Kenya) Bonaventure Maruti
- (United States) Rauwshan McKenzie
- (United States) Ryan McMahen
- (Zimbabwe) Lucky Mkosana
- (United States) Pat Noonan
- (Canada) Devin O'Hea
- (Kenya) Brian Ombiji
- (Ghana) Kofi Opare
- (United States) Jacob Peterson
- (United States) Kofi Sarkodie
- (South Africa) Ty Shipalane
- (United States) Ben Speas
- (United States) Kevin Taylor
- (United States) Zarek Valentin
- (United States) Kyle Veris
- (United States) Nick Kolarac
- (United States) Zach Steinberger
- (Spain) Hugo Bacharach
- (United States) Emeka Eneli
- (United States) Isaac Walker
- (Germany) Jackson Dietrich
- (United States) Dylan Borczak
- (United States) Nate Dragisich
- (United States) Gunther Rankenburg
- (United States) Jacob Erlandson
- (Germany) Noel Caliskan

== Year-by-year ==
| Year | Division | League | Regular season | Playoffs | Open cup |
Mid-Michigan Bucks
| 1996 | 4 | USISL Premier League | 3rd, Central Northern | Premier Six | Did not qualify |
| 1997 | 4 | USISL PDSL | 1st, North Central | Semi-finals | 2nd round |
| 1998 | 4 | USISL PDSL | 2nd, Great Lakes | Regional Finals | Did not qualify |
| 1999 | 4 | USL PDL | 1st, Great Lakes | Conference Semi-finals | 3rd round |
| 2000 | 4 | USL PDL | 1st, Great Lakes | National Final | 3rd round |
| 2001 | 4 | USL PDL | 3rd, Great Lakes | Did not qualify | 2nd round |
| 2002 | 4 | USL PDL | 2nd, Great Lakes | Conference Finals | Did not qualify |
| 2003 | 4 | USL PDL | 1st, Great Lakes | Conference Finals | 3rd round |
Michigan Bucks
| 2004 | 4 | USL PDL | 1st, Great Lakes | Conference Semi-finals | Did not qualify |
| 2005 | 4 | USL PDL | 2nd, Great Lakes | Conference Finals | Did not qualify |
| 2006 | 4 | USL PDL | 2nd, Great Lakes | PDL Champions | 3rd round |
| 2007 | 4 | USL PDL | 1st, Great Lakes | National Final | 1st round |
| 2008 | 4 | USL PDL | 1st, Great Lakes | Conference Semi-finals | 1st round |
| 2009 | 4 | USL PDL | 4th, Great Lakes | Did not qualify | Did not qualify |
| 2010 | 4 | USL PDL | 1st, Great Lakes | Conference Finals | Did not qualify |
| 2011 | 4 | USL PDL | 1st, Great Lakes | Conference Finals | Did not qualify |
| 2012 | 4 | USL PDL | 1st, Great Lakes | Conference Finals | 4th round |
| 2013 | 4 | USL PDL | 2nd, Great Lakes | Conference Semi-finals | 1st round |
| 2014 | 4 | USL PDL | 1st, Great Lakes | PDL Champions | 2nd round |
| 2015 | 4 | USL PDL | 1st, Great Lakes | Conference Finals | 2nd round |
| 2016 | 4 | USL PDL | 1st, Great Lakes | PDL Champions | 1st round |
| 2017 | 4 | USL PDL | 1st, Great Lakes | Conference Semi-finals | 3rd round |
| 2018 | 4 | USL PDL | 4th, Great Lakes | Did not qualify | 1st round |
Flint City Bucks
| 2019 | 4 | USL2 | 2nd, Great Lakes | USL2 Champions | Qualified- DNP |
| 2020 | 4 | USL2 | Season cancelled due to COVID-19 pandemic | | |
| 2021 | 4 | USL2 | 2nd, Great Lakes | Conference Semi-finals | Cancelled |
| 2022 | 4 | USL2 | 2nd, Great Lakes | National Semifinals | Qualified- DNP |
| 2023 | 4 | USL2 | 1st, Great Lakes | National Semifinals | Qualified- DNP |
| 2024 | 4 | USL2 | 1st, Great Lakes | Conference Finals | Did not qualify |
| 2025 | 4 | USL2 | 1st, Great Lakes | National Semifinals | Did not qualify |
| 2026 | 4 | USL2 | 1st, Great Lakes | Runners–up | 2nd Round |

== History vs. Professional Teams in U.S. Open Cup ==
- 6/24/97 – First Round – Wilmington Hammerheads 2 vs. Mid Michigan Bucks 3; E.A. Laney High School in Wilmington, N.C.
- 7/8/97 – Second Round – Mid Michigan Bucks 2 vs. (Rochester Rhinos) 3; Hershey Park Stadium in Hersey, Penn.
- 6/8/99 – First Round – Mid Michigan Bucks 3 vs. Austin Lone Stars 2; White Pine Stadium in Saginaw, Mich.
- 6/23/99 – Second Round – Minnesota Thunder 1 vs. Mid Michigan Bucks 2; National Sports Center in Blaine, Minn.
- 7/12/99 – Third Round – Mid Michigan Bucks 1 vs. Tampa Bay Mutiny 2; White Pine Stadium in Saginaw, Mich.
- 6/14/00 – Second Round – New England Revolution 0 vs. Mid Michigan Bucks 1; Foxboro Stadium in Foxborough, Mass.
- 7/25/00 – Third Round – Mid Michigan Bucks 3 vs. Miami Fusion 3 (5–6 PKs); White Pine Stadium in Saginaw, Mich.
- 6/27/01 – Second Round – New England Revolution 7 vs. Mid Michigan Bucks 1; Foxboro Stadium in Foxborough, Mass.
- 6/25/03 – Second Round – Mid Michigan Bucks 2 vs. Long Island Rough Riders 1; Hurley Field in Berkley, Mich.
- 7/16/03 – Third Round – Mid Michigan Bucks 0 vs. MetroStars 4; Hurley Field in Berkley, Mich.
- 6/14/06 – First Round – Michigan Bucks 2 vs. Pittsburgh Riverhounds 0; Rochester Adams High School in Rochester, Mich.
- 6/28/06 – Second Round – Michigan Bucks 2 vs. Cincinnati Kings 1; Stoney Creek High School in Rochester Hills, Mich.
- 7/12/06 – Third Round – Michigan Bucks 1 vs. Columbus Crew 4; Stoney Creek High School in Rochester Hills, Mich.
- 6/12/07 – First Round – Richmond Kickers 4 vs. Michigan Bucks 2; University of Richmond Stadium in Richmond, Va.
- 6/10/08 – First Round – Michigan Bucks 1 vs Cleveland City Stars 2; Ultimate Soccer Arenas in Pontiac, Mich.
- 5/22/12 – Second Round – Pittsburgh Riverhounds 0 vs. Michigan Bucks 1; Highmark Stadium in Pittsburgh, Pa.
- 5/29/12 – Third Round – Michigan Bucks 3 vs. Chicago Fire S.C. 2 (AET); Ultimate Soccer Arenas in Pontiac, Mich.
- 6/5/12 – Fourth Round – Michigan Bucks 1 vs. Dayton Dutch Lions 1; Oakland University Soccer Field; Rochester, Mich.
- 5/19/15 – Second Round – Michigan Bucks 0 vs. Portland Timbers 2 2; Ultimate Soccer Arenas in Pontiac, Mich.
- 5/17/17 – Second Round – Michigan Bucks 1 vs. Indy Eleven 0; Ultimate Soccer Arenas in Pontiac, Mich.
- 5/30/17 – Third Round – Michigan Bucks 1 vs. St. Louis FC 2; Ultimate Soccer Arenas in Pontiac, Mich.

== Honors ==
=== League ===
- USL Premier Development League / USL League Two
  - Playoff Champions: 2006, 2014, 2016, 2019
  - Regular Season
    - Champions: 2000, 2008, 2012, 2015, 2016
  - Central Conference
    - Champions: 1996, 1997, 2000, 2006, 2007, 2014, 2016, 2019, 2022, 2023
  - Great Lakes Division
    - Champions: 1997, 1999, 2000, 2003, 2004, 2007, 2008, 2010, 2011, 2012, 2014, 2015, 2016, 2017, 2023, 2024
- USISL Premier League
  - North Central Division
  - Champions: 1997
- Hank Steinbrecher Cup
  - Champions: 2017, 2018, 2019, 2022

== Head coaches ==
- (United States) Steve Burns (1996–1999)
- (United States) Joe Malachino (2000–2001)
- (United States) Dario Brose (2002)
- (United States) Don Gemmell (2003–2004)
- (England) Paul Snape (2005)
- (United States) Dan Fitzgerald (2006–2009)
- (United States) Gary Parsons (2010–2013)
- (United States) Demir Muftari (2013–2017)
- (United States) Paul Thomas (2018)
- (United States) Demir Muftari (2019–present)

== Stadiums ==
- Hurley Field; Berkley, Michigan 14 games (2003–2005)
- White Pine Stadium; Saginaw, Michigan 1 game (2003)
- Stadium at Plymouth-Canton Educational Park; Canton, Michigan 4 games (2003)
- Stadium at Oakland University; Rochester, Michigan 4 games (2005)
- Stadium at Stoney Creek High School; Rochester Hills, Michigan (2006)
- Stadium at Athens High School; Troy, Michigan 1 game (2007)
- Independence Park; Canton, Michigan 4 games (2007–2011)
- Stadium at Andover High School; Bloomfield Hills, Michigan 1 game (2007)
- Stadium at Saline High School; Saline, Michigan 1 game (2007)
- Stadium at Lake Orion High School; Lake Orion, Michigan 5 games (2007–2008)
- Stadium at Rochester High School; Rochester Hills, Michigan 1 game (2007)
- Columbus Crew Stadium; Columbus, Ohio 1 game (2007)
- Ultimate Soccer Arenas; Pontiac, Michigan (2008–2018)
- Stadium at Walled Lake Central High School; Walled Lake, Michigan 1 game (2011)
- Atwood Stadium; Flint, Michigan (2019–present)

== Attendances ==
Attendance stats are calculated by averaging each team's self-reported home attendances from Kenn.com

https://kenn.com/blog/soccer/all-time-usl-league-two-attendance/

Mid-Michigan Bucks

- 1996: 498 (16th in USISL Premier League)
- 1997: 567 (12th in PDSL) Playoffs: 730 Overall: 579
- 1998: 824 (3rd in PDSL) Playoffs: NA
- 1999: 987 (3rd in PDL) Playoffs: 752 Overall: 969
- 2000: 576 (4th in PDL) Playoffs: 873 Overall: 616
- 2001: 461 (9th in PDL)
- 2002: 838 (8th in PDL)
- 2003: 424 (18th in PDL) Playoffs: NA

Michigan Bucks

- 2004: 424 (21st in PDL)
- 2005: 603 or 611 (11th in PDL)
- 2006: 268 (36th in PDL) Playoffs: 826 Overall: 338
- 2007: 566 (15th in PDL) Playoffs: 857* 1 Game missing Overall: 624* 1 Game missing
- 2008: 726 (13th in PDL) Playoffs:NA
- 2009: 581 (18th in PDL)
- 2010: 473 (23rd in PDL)
- 2011: 616 (16th in PDL) Playoffs: 870 Overall: 666
- 2012: 579 (14th in PDL) Playoffs: 798 Overall: 627
- 2013: 687 (16th in PDL) Playoffs: 681 Overall: 686
- 2014: 594 (18th in PDL) Playoffs: 1,200*1 Game Missing Overall: 670*1 missing
- 2015: 805 (6th in PDL) NA Playoffs: 912*1 Game Missing Overall: 820
- 2016: NA Playoffs: 1,486
- 2017: NA Playoffs: NA
- 2018: NA

Flint City Bucks

- 2019: NA Playoffs: 5,916
- 2021: NA
- 2022: NA Playoffs: NA
- 2023: NA Playoffs: 3,500*1 Game Missing
- 2024: NA Playoffs: 3,000*1 Game Missing
- 2025: NA Playoffs: 4,000* 1 Game Missing
