= Twin Cities Phoenix =

- Full name: Twin Cities Phoenix
- Nickname: Phoenix
- Founded: 1997
- League: Premier Development League
- 2001: 6th, did not make playoffs
Home colours	Away colours

Twin Cities Phoenix, originally known as Twin Cities Tornado until 2000, were an American soccer team, founded in 1997, who were members of the United Soccer Leagues Premier Development League (PDL), the fourth tier of the American Soccer Pyramid, until 2001, after which the team left the league and the franchise was terminated.

== Year-by-year ==
Year	Division	League	Reg. season	Playoffs	Open Cup
1997	"4"	USL PDSL	6th, Central	Did not qualify	Did not qualify
1998	"4"	USL PDSL	3rd, Central	Divisional Semifinals	Did not qualify
1999	"4"	USL PDL	1st, Heartland	Conference Semifinals	Did not qualify
2000	"4"	USL PDL	5th, Heartland	Did not qualify	Did not qualify
2001	"4"	USL PDL	5th, Heartland	Did not qualify	Did not qualify
