= Silicon Valley Ambassadors =

The Silicon Valley Ambassadors were an American soccer team based in Los Altos Hills, California that played in the USISL. The club played in the USISL Premier League, Western Conference, Southwest Division in 1998–1999. General manager and club owner was Silvian Centiu. head coach Joe Silveira (1998). Their home field was at the Foothill College, Los Altos Hills.

Their website was www.goambassadors.com (now down).
