= Bonaventure Maruti =

Kenyan footballer (born 1976)

Personal information
- Full name: Bonaventure Ombira Maruti
- Date of birth: 10 April 1976 (age 50)
- Place of birth: Nairobi, Kenya
- Height: 1.83 m (6 ft 0 in)
- Position: Striker

Senior career*
Years	Team	Apps	(Gls)
1996	Gor Mahia		
1997–2000	Mid-Michigan Bucks		
2001–2003	Örebro	34	(10)
2005	Bryne	14	(0)
2006–2010	Follo	109	(55)
2011–2013	Fram		
2013–2015	Vollen		

International career
2001–2007	Kenya	23	(7)
- * Club domestic league appearances and goals as of 5 January 2020

Bonaventure Ombira Maruti (born 10 April 1976) is a Kenyan former footballer who played as a striker. He last played for Vollen UL in Norway.

Maruti played 23 international matches for the Kenyan national team. He is Follo's leading scorer all-time. He surpassed the previous mark of 34 goals for the first team held by Oddmund Vaagsholm. He has scored 36 goals in 66 games overall (as of 09/09/08).

He has helped the two youth players from Kenya to settle into the area. Christian Bwamy and Joanes Muingi both signed by Follo from Kenyan club Mathare United.

In 2011, he joined Fram Larvik. In 2013, he stepped down two tiers to play for Vollen.

== Career statistics ==
Season	Club	Division	League		Cup	
Season	Club	Division	Apps	Goals	Apps	Goals
2001	Örebro SK	Allsvenskan	23	7	0	0
2002	Örebro SK	Allsvenskan	11	3	0	0
2003	Örebro SK	Allsvenskan	0	0	0	0
2005	Bryne FK	Adeccoligaen	14	0	3	1
2006	Follo	Adeccoligaen	23	11	1	4
2007	Follo	Second Division	17	8	2	0
2008	Follo	Second Division	25	16	2	1
2009	Follo	Second Division	26	16	2	0
2010	Follo	Adeccoligaen	18	4	4	4
Career total			157	65	14	10
