= Chicago Sockers =

American soccer team

- Full name: Chicago Sockers Football Club
- Nickname: The Sockers
- Founded: 1995 (as Chicago Stingers)
- Dissolved: 2000
- Ground: Olympic Park; Schaumburg, Illinois
- Chairman: Peter G. Richardson
- Manager: Bret Hall
- League: Premier Development League
- 2000: 1st, Heartland Division; Playoffs: Champions
- Website: http://www.sockersfcchicago.com/
Home colors	Away colors

The Chicago Sockers were an American soccer team that were founded in 1995 as the Chicago Stingers. The team was a member of the United Soccer Leagues (USL) and played at the professional level in the USISL Pro League, USISL Select League and USISL D-3 Pro League until 1999. The club was renamed Sockers and choose to be relegated to the amateur USL Premier Development League (PDL), the fourth tier of the American soccer pyramid, for the 1999 season.

The Sockers were one of the most successful amateur teams in the late 1990s, winning three national titles including back-to-back PDL Championships in 1999 and 2000, reaching two divisional playoffs, and getting to both the quarterfinal and semifinal of the US Open Cup prior to 2000. Following the 2000 season, despite being reigning PDL Champions, the Sockers folded. However, the club survives as a youth soccer organization under the same name.

The Sockers played their home games at Olympic Park in the village of Schaumburg, Illinois, a suburb of Chicago. The team's colors were blue and white.

== History ==
The Chicago Stingers were founded in 1995 as a professional club to play in the USL. The club played in various transitional professional leagues in the USL, including the USISL Pro League, USISL Select League and USISL D-3 Pro League, which at the time represented the second or third tier of professional soccer in the American soccer pyramid under Major League Soccer (MLS).

For the 1999 season, the club was renamed Chicago FC Sockers (or Chicago Sockers) and relegated itself to the amateur USL Premier Development League (PDL), considered the top national amateur league and the fourth tier in the pyramid. The Sockers had a very successful first season in the PDL, finishing second in the Great Lakes Division and defeating the Spokane Shadow 3–1 in the PDL Championship.

The Sockers were Champions again in 2000 after a move to the Heartland Division, finishing first in the regular season and defeating the Mid-Michigan Bucks 1–0 in the Championship final. In 2000, the Sockers, also made an impressive run in the 2000 U.S. Open Cup. The PDL amateur club defeated an MLS side, Kansas City Wizards, in a hard-fought penalty shootout after a 0 - 0 overtime score. The Sockers came close to a similar upset of an MLS team in the third round but fell short, 1 - 0 to the eventual U.S. Open Cup champion, Chicago Fire.

== Youth programs ==
The Chicago Sockers is now a prominent youth soccer program, stationed in Palatine, Illinois. The program is ranked as the fifth best boys youth soccer program by both nationalsoccerranking.com and Soccer America. The Sockers play in the Northern Illinois Soccer League (NISL), U.S. Soccer Development Academy and the Elite Clubs National League (ECNL). The program has won several national championships and has sent several players to the US Men's National Team and top professional clubs in Major League Soccer and abroad. These players include Jonathan Spector, Michael Bradley, Jay DeMerit, Mike Magee, Will Johnson, Michael Stephens and Bryan Namoff.

== Year-by-year ==
Year	Division	League	Reg. season	Playoffs	Open Cup
Chicago Stingers
1995	3	USISL Pro League	2nd, Midwest East	Divisional Semifinals	Semifinals
1996	3	USISL Select League	5th, Central	Did not qualify	Did not qualify
1997	3	USISL D-3 Pro League	1st, North Central	Division Finals	Quarterfinals
1998	3	USISL D-3 Pro League	2nd, North Central	Champion	3rd Round
Chicago Sockers
1999	"4"	USL PDL	2nd, Great Lakes	Champion	Did not qualify
2000	"4"	USL PDL	1st, Heartland	Champion	3rd Round

== Coaches ==
- Bret Hall 1998–present
- David Richardson1986– present
- Oleg Vatchev 2000–present
- Ahmed R Gad 2000–2022
- Michael Richardson 1986–present
- Nilton (Batata) DaSilva 1986–present
- Arthur Wyrot 1997–present
