= USL League Two =

American semi-professional soccer league

- Organizing body: United Soccer League
- Founded: 1995; 31 years ago (as USISL Premier League)
- First season: 1995
- Country: United States
- Confederation: U.S. Soccer
- Divisions: 20 divisions in 4 conferences
- Number of clubs: 158
- Domestic cup: U.S. Open Cup
- Current champion(s): Vermont Green (2nd title) (2026)
- Most championships: Flint City Bucks (4 titles)
- Broadcasters: SportsEngine Play; YouTube
- Website: uslleaguetwo.com
- Current: 2026 USL League Two season

USL League Two (USL2), formerly the Premier Development League (PDL), is a semi-professional soccer league organized by the United Soccer League in the United States, forming part of the United States soccer league system. In the 2026 season, the league features 158 teams split into twenty regional divisions across four conferences. USL League Two is headquartered in Tampa, Florida.

Vermont Green FC are the current champions, having defeated Flint City Bucks 2–1 in the 2026 USL League Two Championship final on August 1, 2026, successfully defending their title and becoming the first club to win back-to-back USL2 championships since the Cape Cod Crusaders in 2002-2003.

== Competition format ==
USL League Two is divided into 4 conferences (Eastern, Central, Southern, and Western), comprising 20 divisions. The league season runs from May through July, with the playoffs decided through July and August. All teams play a regular season schedule of 12–14 games, up to seven home and seven away, within their division, depending on the size of the division.

=== Playoffs ===
The USL2 playoffs see division winners and each conference's best second-place finishers advance to the conference quarter finals. All matches in the playoffs are played in a single-match elimination format, with each conference winner hosting a four-team conference championship weekend. The four conference champions advance to the national semi-finals and the league Championship, both played at the home of the higher seed.

== History ==
=== 1990s ===
In 1995, the United States Interregional Soccer League (USISL) changed its name to the United States International Soccer League, and split into two leagues, one professional (the 'Professional League', which ultimately became the USL Second Division) and one amateur (the Premier League). The purpose for the split was to expand into and improve the soccer capabilities of many urban areas throughout the United States and Canada, while offering current college soccer players the opportunity to continue playing during the summer months without losing their college eligibility. The inaugural season of the new USISL Premier League featured 27 teams, and the Richmond Kickers won the first title, beating the Cocoa Expos 3–1 in the championship game. Gabe Jones of the Austin Lone Stars was the league's top scorer and MVP.

The United States International Soccer League changed its name again in 1996, to the United Systems of Independent Soccer Leagues, and before the season, there was substantial movement of teams between the Pro League, the Premier League and the newly created Select League (which would later merge with the A-League, and eventually become the USL First Division). The Premier League grew to 34 teams in its second year, with the Central Coast Roadrunners from San Luis Obispo, California, beating the San Francisco Bay Seals in the championship game to take the title. Pasi Kinturi of the Nashville Metros was the league's top scorer and MVP.

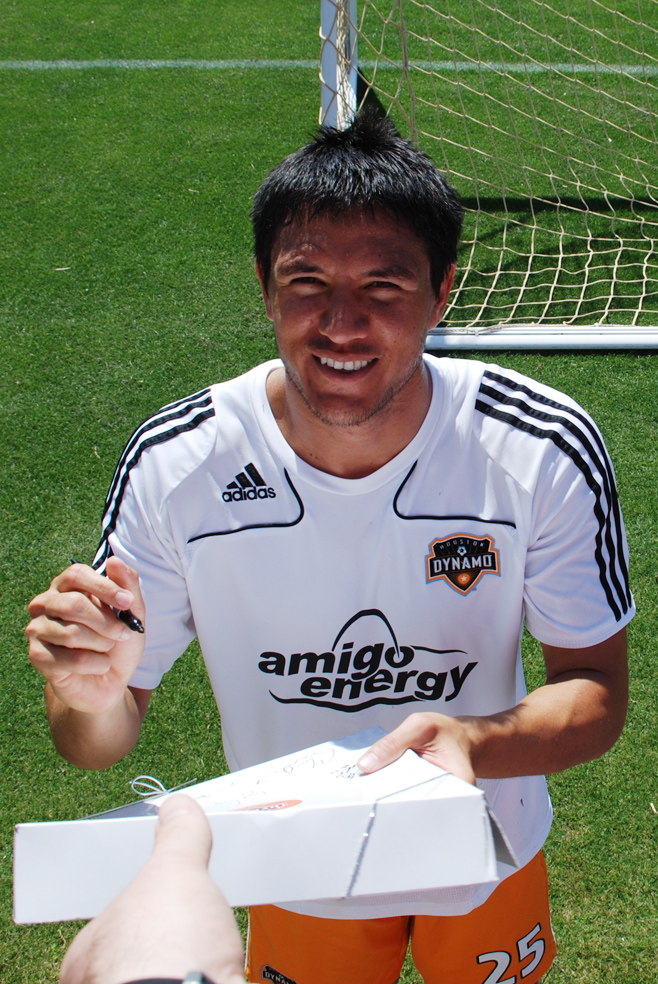
Brian Ching, the PDL Rookie of the Year in 1998

The Premier League renamed itself the Premier Development Soccer League (PDSL) in 1997, and the Central Coast Roadrunners repeated as national champions, the first team to do so, beating the Cocoa Expos in the PDSL championship game. Lester Felicia of the Jackson Chargers was the league's MVP, while Rodrigo Costa of the Detroit Dynamite was the leading scorer and the league's Rookie of the Year, tallying 21 goals and 2 assists for 44 points. In 1998, the PDSL took to the field with 33 teams, including four associate members from the Pacific Coast Soccer League who played shortened schedules after their PCSL season was over. In the championship game, the San Gabriel Valley Highlanders upset regular season champions Jackson Chargers 3–2, taking the trophy to California for the third straight year. Rodrigo Costa of the Detroit Dynamite was the league MVP, Boniventure Manati of the Jackson Chargers was the league's top scorer, and a young striker by the name of Brian Ching from the Spokane Shadow was named Rookie of the Year.

In 1999 the umbrella USISL changed its name to the United Soccer Leagues, and the Premier Development Soccer League dropped the 'soccer' part of its name and became known as the USL Premier Development League, or PDL. The league took in several teams from the D3 Pro league, expanding to 42 teams in six divisions. Expansion franchise Chicago Sockers ultimately won the league, beating Spokane Shadow 3–1 for the title in a tight championship game. Fabio Eidenwein of the Sioux City Breeze was named League MVP and was the top scorer, with 20 goals.

=== 2000s ===
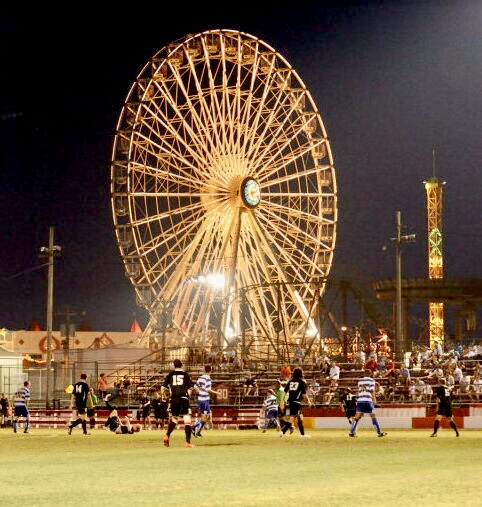
The 2000s was a period of growth for the league, as many clubs (2003 newcomer South Jersey Barons pictured) began to join the expanding league.

The PDL expanded by a further eight franchises in 2000, and the Chicago Sockers won their second straight title, beating the Mid-Michigan Bucks in a close 1–0 championship game. The single goal was scored by Rodrigo Costa who, having received a pass from teammate Hamid Mehreioskouei, chipped Bucks goalkeeper Eric Pogue from 18 yards through a crowded penalty area. Fernando Salazar of the Los Angeles-based San Fernando Valley Heroes was the league's MVP, while his teammate Arshak Abyanli took the honors as top goalscorer.

The league grew from 41 to 44 teams in 2001 through the usual mix of relegation from D3Pro, teams folding, and new franchises being added. In the semi-finals, the Westchester Flames defeated Sioux Falls Spitfire 5–1 and Calgary Storm defeated Des Moines Menace 2–1; in the final, Westchester defeated Calgary 3–1 to take their first league title. Des Moines and Chicago Fire Reserves dominated the 2002 regular season, but both teams stuttered in the playoffs; the PDL final saw the Cape Cod Crusaders defeating the Boulder Rapids Reserve 2–1 to bring the title to the Northeast for the second year in a row. 2002 also saw the debut of the soon-to-be PDL legend, Tomas Boltnar of Des Moines Menace, who secured an unprecedented triple-crown of PDL MVP, Top Scorer, and Rookie of the Year.

The mid-2000s was a period of steady growth and consolidation for the PDL. A TV agreement with Fox Soccer Channel saw the PDL Championship game being broadcast live on national television in North America for the first time, and professional teams began investing in the league by adding U-23 development sides as an addition to their senior rosters. Cape Cod repeated as PDL champs in 2003, beating the Chicago Fire Reserves in the final (and despite the presence of Jürgen Klinsmann playing for Orange County Blue Star), while 2004 saw the title head to Florida for the first time as the Central Florida Kraze overcame perennial bridesmaids Boulder Rapids Reserve.

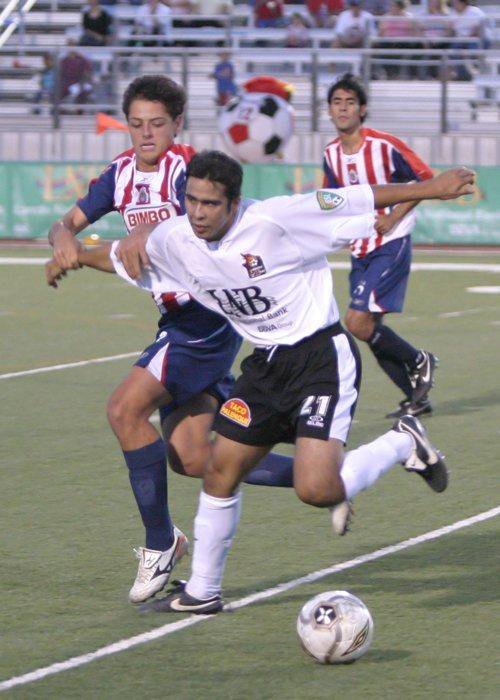
Laredo Heat SC (pictured in 2006) were one of the most successful clubs in the 2000s.

Des Moines Menace took the PDL Championship trophy back to Iowa in 2005 after beating the El Paso Patriots 6–5 on penalty kicks, following a 0–0 draw in the PDL Championship game. 2006 saw the beginning of two seasons of dominance for two teams: the Michigan Bucks and the Laredo Heat. Both teams made the PDL Final in 2006 and 2007, with the Bucks emerging victorious in '06 with a 2–1 win thanks to goals by Kenny Uzoigwe and Ty Shipalane, only for Laredo to get their revenge the following year with an epic penalty kicks win after a 0–0 tie in regulation time.

Laredo became the first team to make three consecutive PDL championship games in 2008, but fell at the final hurdle to Thunder Bay Chill, who became the first ever Canadian side to win the PDL following their 4–1 penalty shootout victory. The PDL had grown to 68 teams by 2009, and to reflect their growing reputation, introduced a new scheme called PDL-Pro, whereby certain teams would be allowed to act as professional clubs, paying players, while still adhering to NCAA collegiate eligibility rules, and the USL's own age restriction policy. Ventura County Fusion returned the PDL title to Southern California for the first time in over a decade with a stoppage-time victory over Chicago Fire Premier, and in doing so became the lowest-seeded team to claim the national title.

=== 2010s ===
The 2010s began with a record, as the Portland Timbers U23s ended the season as national champions, beating Thunder Bay Chill 4–1 in the 2010 PDL Championship game. The Timbers also had the best regular season record, winning all their 16 games, scoring 53 goals and conceding just six along the way. In doing so the Timbers became the first team to post a perfect PDL regular season record since the Jackson Chargers in 1998, the first regular season champion to win the playoffs since the Central Coast Roadrunners in 1996, and the first team in PDL history to go through an entire PDL regular season and playoff campaign without posting a loss or a tie. Portland Timbers U23s striker Brent Richards was named League MVP and Rookie of the Year for his stellar campaign with the national champions. Players from the Canadian side Thunder Bay Chill led the majority of the statistical categories, with striker Brandon Swartzendruber leading the league with 15 goals, while his teammate Gustavo Oliveira led the league with 13 assists. Portland Timbers U23s goalkeeper Jake Gleeson enjoyed the best goalkeeping statistics, allowing just five goals in 15 games and earning a 0.360 GAA average.

Western Conference teams dominated the league in 2011 for the third year in a row, with the Kitsap Pumas ending the season as national champions, beating Laredo Heat 1–0 in the 2011 PDL Championship game. Kitsap, who lost just one game and conceded just ten goals all season, were the second team from the Northwest Division to win the national title in a row, while Laredo were contesting their fourth championship game in six years. Kitsap was also the first PDL-Pro team to win the championship, a milestone for the league. Kitsap's Western Conference rivals Fresno Fuego had the best regular-season record, posting an unbeaten 13–0–3 record. Fresno midfielder Milton Blanco was named League MVP, after leading the league in points (38) and assists (14) and helping his team to the Southwest Division title. Two Michigan Bucks players – Stewart Givens and Mitch Hildebrandt – were given end-of-season awards as Defender of the Year and Goalkeeper of the Year, respectively, while their coach, Gary Parsons, was named Coach of the Year. Jake Keegan of the Westchester Flames was named Rookie of the Year after tallying 16 goals in 16 games to take the league goal-scoring crown. Keegan accounted for 64 percent of Westchester's goals in 2011 and also finished third in the league in points with 34.

The 2012 PDL season would see a resurgence of the Eastern Conference, as the Michigan Bucks would claim the regular season title, with Canadian rivals Forest City London winning their first ever PDL Championship in an East coast contest, defeating Carolina Dynamo 2–1. Canadian clubs would also have another strong season in 2013, with four of eight Canadian clubs finishing in the final eight and two, the Victoria Highlanders and Thunder Bay Chill, advancing to the semi-finals. After a final four finish in 2012, The Chill would repeat their strong season, winning the 2013 regular season title but falling to the Austin Aztex in the Championship final 3–1 in front of a crowd of 4,253 fans, the largest attendance for a final since 2007.

In 2014, the Michigan Bucks would claim their second PDL Championship, defeating the Kitsap Pumas 1–0 on August 3, 2014, following a strong regular season campaign with a record of 9–2–3.

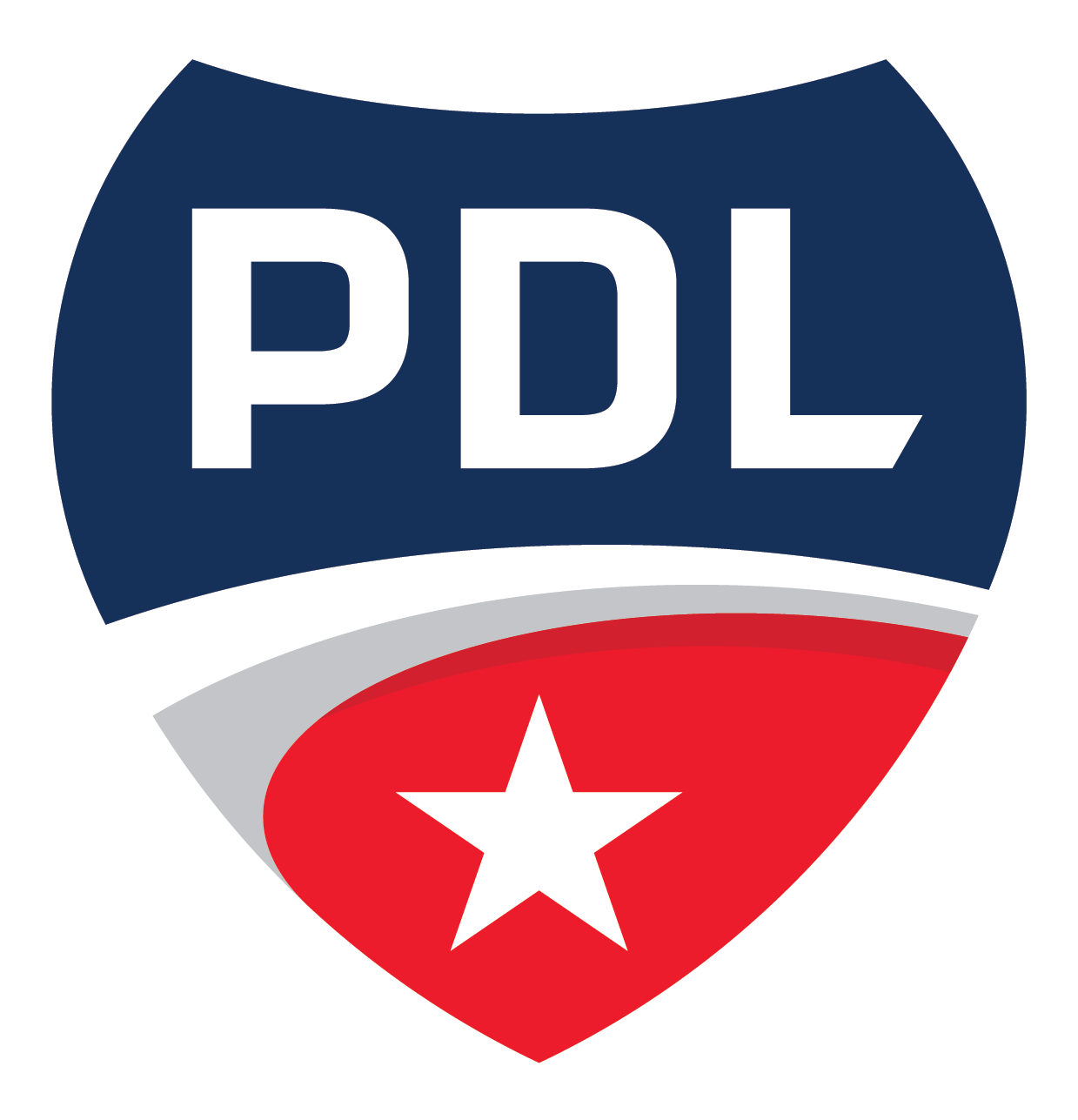
Logo used from 2016 to 2018.

With USL Pro re-branding as the United Soccer League in February 2015, the PDL dropped the "USL" descriptor from their name, simply operating as the "Premier Development League".

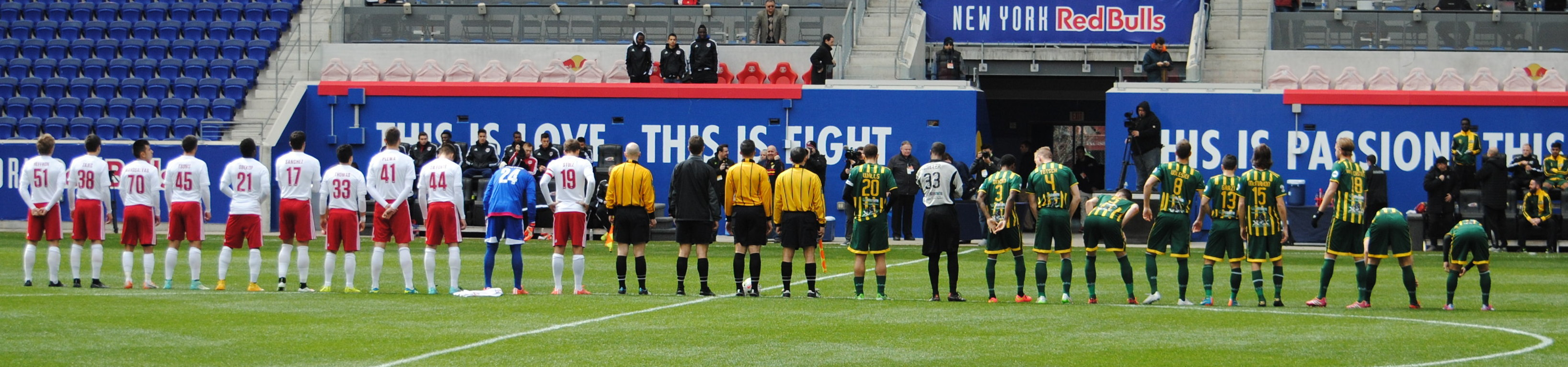
The league entered a new phase in the 2010s that saw MLS development teams (Red Bulls New York II pictured) dominating the league.

The 2015 season saw league newcomers, New York Red Bulls U-23, finish first in the Mid Atlantic Division and advance to the Championship Final. They were defeated 4–3 by K-W United FC, which advanced from the Great Lakes Division after defeating Forest City London and defending champions Michigan Bucks. The final was held on August 3, 2015, at Starfire Stadium in Tukwila, Washington. The victory marked K-W United FC's first championship and the third by a Canadian club.

In May 2018, the league did not permit Calgary Foothills FC to sign Stephanie Labbé, a goalkeeper for the Canadian women's team, even though the team had offered her a position. The decision was made due to her gender. Lubbe filed a lawsuit against the league.

In 2018, it was announced that the PDL would be renamed as USL League Two in advance of the 2019 season.

=== 2020s ===
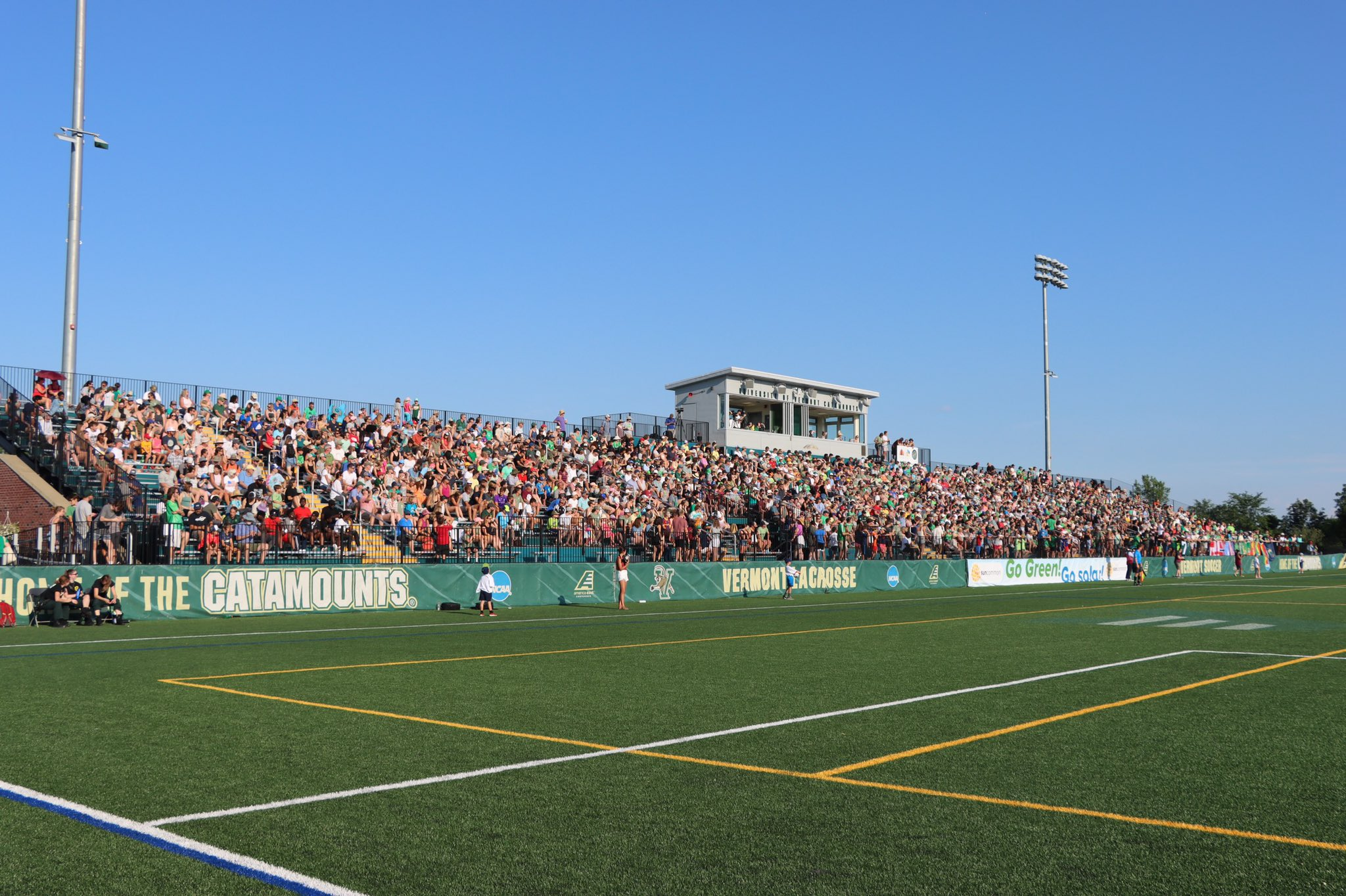
The 2020s saw an explosion of popularity of USL League Two clubs, with some clubs (Vermont Green FC pictured) averaging four digit attendance figures.

The league was forced to cancel the 2020 season due to the COVID-19 pandemic. The league returned for the 2021 season, although the Southwest division elected not to play due to concerns over COVID-19. The 2022 season saw the Southwest division return and thus was the first full season for the league since 2019. There were two new divisions added for the 2023 season, the Nor Cal and South Florida divisions, which were formed with expansions and former clubs from the Southwest and Southeast divisions respectively.

The Northwest Division underwent a major expansion for the 2024 season by adding three new teams from the state of Washington (West Seattle Junction FC, Tacoma Stars, Midlakes United).

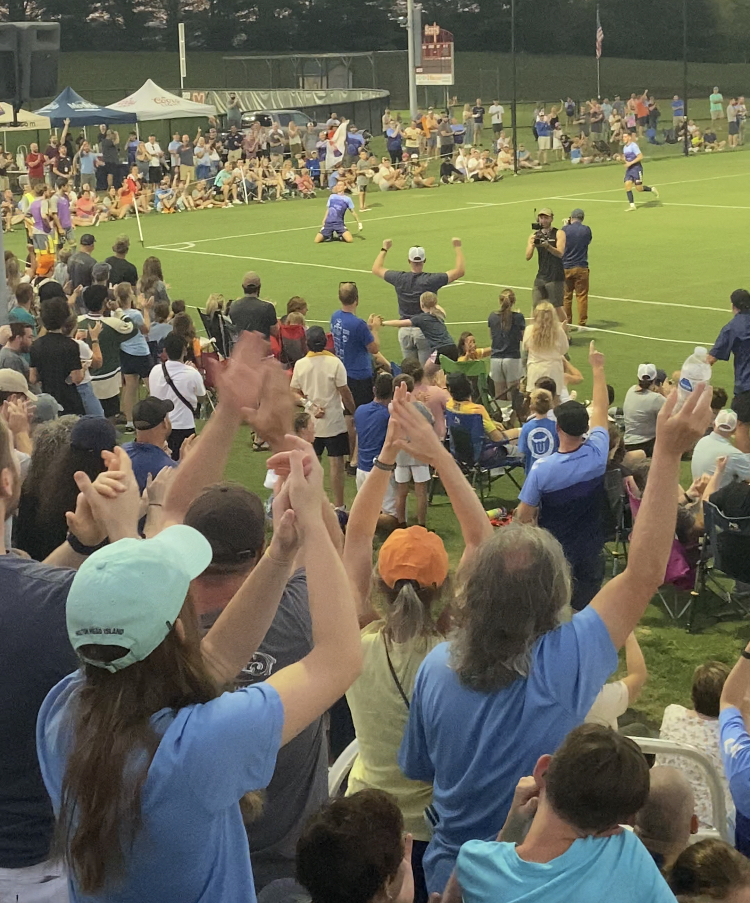
Many clubs (One Knoxville SC pictured) used their success as amateur clubs in the USL League Two to springboard into professional status in USL League One.

Following the 2025 season Lane United FC announced they were disbanding after twelve seasons to make way for a newly established professional side, Sporting Cascades FC, who will join USL League One for the 2026 season.

The 2026 season will see four other of the league's clubs (Fort Wayne, Corpus Christi, Fort Lauderdale, and Sarasota) establish professional teams in USL League One. Corpus Christi and Fort Lauderdale will continue to run their League Two teams in the 2026 season in addition to their professional sides. In October 2025, Texoma FC announced that they will be self-relegating from USL League One for the 2026 season, with their ownership intending to bring back a League One team to North Texas in the future.

== Organization ==
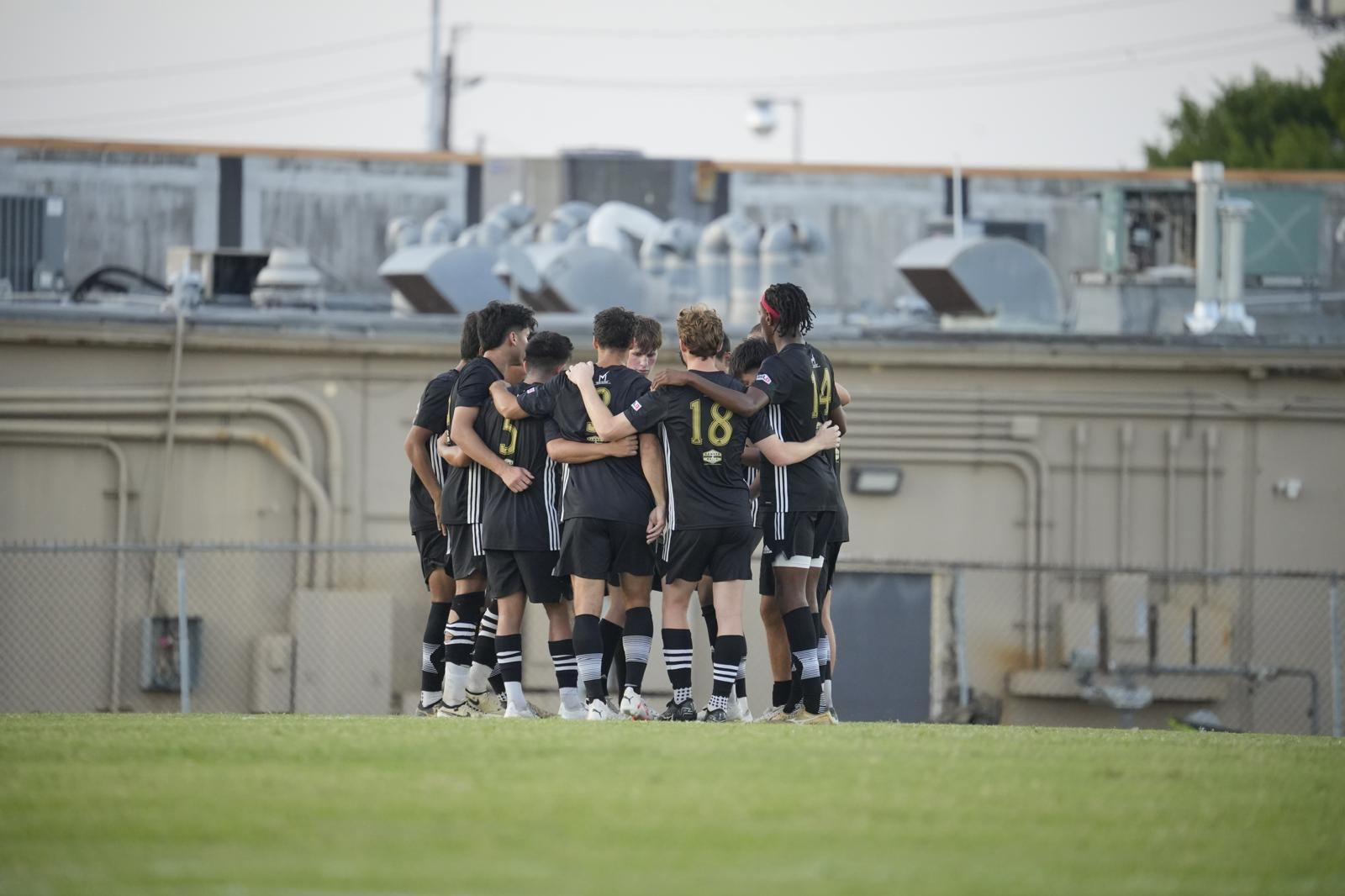
USL League Two has been a league that heavily focused on developing young talent to prepare players for future professional careers (Houston FC pictured).

As USL League Two seasons take place during the summer months, the player pool is drawn mainly from elite college soccer players seeking to continue playing high-level soccer during their summer break, which they can do while still maintaining their college eligibility, as USL2 is not considered a professional league.

Formerly, teams such as Laredo Heat, New Orleans Jesters, Vancouver Whitecaps FC U-23, Kitsap Pumas and the Hollywood United Hitmen had embraced partial professionalism through the PDL-Pro program, whereby teams could choose to employ players who were paid for their performances, but who still met the age eligibility criteria. This did not contravene NCAA rules, which state that college players cannot play alongside professionals, but may play against them. What this also meant, however, is that PDL-Pro teams could not have any active NCAA players on their rosters, but could employ NAIA and community college players, ex-NCAA players who have already graduated, or other local players who do not play college soccer at all.

Currently, all USL2 teams field amateur U-23 squads. Additionally, USL2 squads often also include standout high school and junior club players, as well as former professionals seeking to continue competing at a high level, often having been forced to retire from top-flight competition due to age or injury. League rules dictate that a maximum of eight players on each team's 26-man roster can be over 23 years old, while at least three players on each team's roster must be 18 or younger.

Increasingly, League Two is seen as a 'shop window' for professional clubs looking to discover and identify aspiring professional players who may enter the MLS SuperDraft in future years. Many of the players currently playing in Major League Soccer and elsewhere began their careers in the league.

== Teams ==
=== Current teams ===
The following teams are current members of USL League Two.

Conference	Division	Team	City	Stadium	Founded	Joined	Head coach
Eastern Conference	Northeast Division	AC Connecticut (Note: AC Connecticut was known as CFC Azul until the end of the 2014 season)	Danbury, Connecticut	Western Connecticut State University	2011	2012	(England) Alex Harrison (United States) Joe Mingachos
Eastern Conference	Northeast Division	Albany Rush	Schenectady, New York	Union College College Park Field	2021	2022	(United States) Steve Freeman
Eastern Conference	Northeast Division	Black Rock FC	Nashua, New Hampshire	Rivier University	2013	2018	(United States) Brad Agoos
Eastern Conference	Northeast Division	Boston Bolts (Note: Boston Bolts was known as FC Boston until the end of the 2018 season)	Waltham, Massachusetts	Brandeis University	2015	2016	(Scotland) Greig Robertson
Eastern Conference	Northeast Division	Boston City FC	Malden, Massachusetts	Brother Gilbert Stadium at Malden Catholic High School	2015	2022	(Brazil) Roberto Mazzinghy
Eastern Conference	Northeast Division	Connecticut Rush	Old Saybrook, Connecticut	Lyme-Old Lyme High School	2012	2026	(United States) Greg Cumpstone
Eastern Conference	Northeast Division	New England Fútbol Club	Mendon, Massachusetts	Alumni Stadium	1992	2025	(United States) Jake Beverlin
Eastern Conference	Northeast Division	Seacoast United Phantoms (Note: Seacoast United Phantoms was known as New Hampshire Phantoms until the end of the 2011 season)	Epping, New Hampshire	Seacoast United Outdoor Complex	1996	2008	(United States) Josh Taylor
Eastern Conference	Northeast Division	Vermont Green FC	Burlington, Vermont	Virtue Field	2021	2022	(England) Chris Taylor
Eastern Conference	Northeast Division	Western Mass Pioneers	Ludlow, Massachusetts	Lusitano Stadium	1998	2010	(Argentina) Federico Molinari
Eastern Conference	Mid Atlantic Division	Delaware FC	Wilmington, Delaware	Abessinio Stadium (Note: For the 2025 Season, Delaware FC is playing half of their home games at Wilmington University)	1989	2025	(United States) Paul Marco
Eastern Conference	Mid Atlantic Division	Eagle FC	Mechanicsburg, Pennsylvania	Mountain View High School	1976	2026	Dan Malone
Eastern Conference	Mid Atlantic Division	Lehigh Valley United	Bethlehem, Pennsylvania	Rocco Calvo Field	2009	2015	(United States) Andrew Adlard
Eastern Conference	Mid Atlantic Division	Ocean City Nor'easters (Note: Ocean City Nor'easters were known as South Jersey Barons until the end of the 2009 season)	Ocean City, New Jersey	Carey Stadium	1996	2003	(Republic of Ireland) Alan McCann
Eastern Conference	Mid Atlantic Division	Pennsylvania Classics AC	Lancaster, Pennsylvania	Spooky Nook Sports Complex	2003	2026	Steve Klein
Eastern Conference	Mid Atlantic Division	Philadelphia Lone Star FC	Philadelphia, Pennsylvania	South Philadelphia Athletic Super Site	2001	2021	(Sierra Leone) Fatoma Turay
Eastern Conference	Mid Atlantic Division	Reading United AC (Note: Reading United AC was known as Reading Rage until the end of the 2009 season)	Reading, Pennsylvania	Don Thomas Stadium	1996	2004	(United States) Casey Moore
Eastern Conference	Mid Atlantic Division	Real Central New Jersey	Lawrence Township, New Jersey	Ben Cohen Field at Rider University	2020	2021	(United States) Brian Woods
Eastern Conference	Mid Atlantic Division	West Chester United SC	West Chester, Pennsylvania	Kildare's Field	1976	2020*	(United States) Blaise Santangelo
Eastern Conference	Metropolitan Division	Cedar Stars Rush	Teaneck, New Jersey	Fairleigh Dickinson University	2018	2019	(United States) Juan Santamaria
Eastern Conference	Metropolitan Division	Hudson Valley Hammers	Newburgh, New York	Mount Saint Mary College	2021	2022	(United States) Colin Hodge
Eastern Conference	Metropolitan Division	Ironbound SC	Newark, New Jersey	Eddie Moraes Stadium	2006	2023	(Portugal) (United States) Nick Lavrador
Eastern Conference	Metropolitan Division	Long Island Rough Riders	Hempstead, New York	Hofstra University Soccer Stadium	1994	2007	(Puerto Rico) Chris Megaloudis
Eastern Conference	Metropolitan Division	Manhattan SC	New York City, New York	Gaelic Park / Randall's Island	1997	2019	(United States) Richard Corvino (Albania) Marius Kapxhiu
Eastern Conference	Metropolitan Division	Morris Elite SC	Livingston, New Jersey	Livingston High School	2016	2021	(Ecuador) Javier Velasco
Eastern Conference	Metropolitan Division	FC Motown	Morristown, New Jersey	Ranger Stadium	2012	2021	(Northern Ireland) Alan McClintock
Eastern Conference	Metropolitan Division	New Jersey Copa FC	Metuchen, New Jersey	St. Joseph High School	2004	2021	(Republic of Ireland) Aidan Gaule
Eastern Conference	Metropolitan Division	Staten Island ASC (Note: Previously played as Springfield Athletic SC)	Staten Island, New York (Note: Previously located in Springfield, Illinois)	Lions for Hope Sports Complex	2021	2022	(Trinidad and Tobago) Paul Maye
Eastern Conference	Metropolitan Division	Westchester Flames	New Rochelle, New York	City Park Stadium	1999	1999/2005	(Portugal) Jose Dos Santos
Eastern Conference	Chesapeake Division	Annapolis Blues FC	Annapolis, Maryland	Navy–Marine Corps Memorial Stadium	2022	2025	(Scotland) Colin Herriot
Eastern Conference	Chesapeake Division	Bethesda SC	Bethesda, Maryland	Maureen Hendrick's Field	1979	2026	(France) Pierre Dyer
Eastern Conference	Chesapeake Division	Charlottesville Blues FC	Charlottesville, Virginia	St. Anne's-Belfield School	2023	2024	(United States) Tommy DiNuzzo
Eastern Conference	Chesapeake Division	Christos FC	Baltimore, Maryland	Under Armour Stadium	1997	2022	(United States) Mike St. Martin
Eastern Conference	Chesapeake Division	Hill City FC	Lynchburg, Virginia	City Stadium	2025	2026	(Argentina) Lucas Paulini
Eastern Conference	Chesapeake Division	Lionsbridge FC	Newport News, Virginia	TowneBank Stadium	2017	2018	(England) Chris Whalley
Eastern Conference	Chesapeake Division	Loudoun United FC 2	Leesburg, Virginia	Segra Field	2018	2026	(England) Matthew Mountford
Eastern Conference	Chesapeake Division	Northern Virginia FC (Note: Northern Virginia FC was previously known as Northern Virginia Royals, D.C. United U-23, and Evergreen FC)	Leesburg, Virginia	Segra Field	1998	2006	(England) Ian Bishop
Eastern Conference	Chesapeake Division	Patuxent Football Athletics	Leonardtown, Maryland	St. Mary's Ryken High School	2018	2022	(Trinidad and Tobago) Myron Garnes
Eastern Conference	Chesapeake Division	Virginia Beach United FC	Virginia Beach, Virginia	Virginia Beach Sportsplex	2019	2019	(United States) Matt Ellinger
Eastern Conference	Chesapeake Division	Virginia Marauders FC	Winchester, Virginia	Winchester Sportsplex	2023	2023	(United States) Alexander Zaroyan
Eastern Conference	South Atlantic Division	Appalachian FC	Boone, North Carolina	ASU Soccer Stadium	2020	2026	(England) Dale Parker
Eastern Conference	South Atlantic Division	Asheville City SC	Asheville, North Carolina	UNC Asheville	2016	2020*	(England) Scott Wells
Eastern Conference	South Atlantic Division	Charlotte Eagles	Charlotte, North Carolina	Sportsplex at Matthews	1991	2015	(United States) Chris McClellan
Eastern Conference	South Atlantic Division	Charlotte Independence II	Rock Hill, South Carolina	Manchester Meadows Soccer Complex	2019	2020	(Republic of Ireland) Dave Carton
Eastern Conference	South Atlantic Division	Hickory FC	Hickory, North Carolina	Moretz Stadium	2023	2026	(Spain) Carlos Rubio
Eastern Conference	South Atlantic Division	North Carolina FC U23 (Note: North Carolina FC U23 has previously been known as Raleigh CASL Elite, Carolina RailHawks U23s, and Cary Clarets while in the PDL)	Cary, North Carolina	WakeMed Soccer Park	2017	2002/2017	(United States) Tom Harris
Eastern Conference	South Atlantic Division	Port City FC	Wilmington, North Carolina	UNCW Soccer Stadium & Legion Stadium	2014	2026	(United States) Austin Martz
Eastern Conference	South Atlantic Division	Salem City FC	Winston-Salem, North Carolina	Truist Sports Park	1993	2024	(Wales) Chris Williams
Eastern Conference	South Atlantic Division	SC United Bantams (Note: SC United Bantams was known as Palmetto United Bantams until the end of the 2014 season)	Columbia, South Carolina	Southeastern Freight Lines Soccer Complex	2012	2012	(United States) Nathan Smith
Eastern Conference	South Atlantic Division	Tobacco Road FC	Durham, North Carolina	Durham County Stadium	2013	2017	(United States) Cedric Burke
Eastern Conference	South Atlantic Division	Wake FC	Holly Springs, North Carolina	Ting Park	2001	2019	(United States) Eddie Rodriguez
Central Conference	Great Forest Division	Akron City FC	Akron, Ohio	Green Street Stadium	2021	2025	(England) Andy Hoggarth
Central Conference	Great Forest Division	FC Buffalo	Buffalo, New York	Coyer Field	2009	2023	(England) Carl Kennedy
Central Conference	Great Forest Division	Cleveland Force SC	Cleveland, Ohio	Krenzler Field	2011	2022	(United States) Nick Taljan
Central Conference	Great Forest Division	Erie Sports Center FC	Erie, Pennsylvania	Erie Sports Center	2025	2025	(South Africa) Troy Bingham
Central Conference	Great Forest Division	Lorain County Leviathan FC	Avon, Ohio	ForeFront Field	2025	2026	(United States) Blake New
Central Conference	Great Forest Division	Pittsburgh Riverhounds 2	Pittsburgh, Pennsylvania	Highmark Stadium	2013	2026	(United States) Josh Kremers
Central Conference	Great Forest Division	Steel City FC	Cheswick, Pennsylvania	Founder's Field	2019	2025	(United States) Dan Brower
Central Conference	Valley Division						
Central Conference	Valley Division	Dayton Dutch Lions	West Carrollton, Ohio	DOC Stadium	2009	2010/2015	(Netherlands) Hans Pascoal
Central Conference	Valley Division	Kings Hammer FC Columbus	Columbus, Ohio	New Albany High School	2007	2025	(England) Matt Ogden
Central Conference	Valley Division	Louisville City FC U-23	Louisville, Kentucky	Lynn Family Sports Vision & Training Center	2014	2026	TBD
Central Conference	Valley Division	Northern Indiana FC	South Bend, Indiana	Indiana Invaders Complex	2023	2025	(Mexico) Gerardo Mascareño
Central Conference	Valley Division	Toledo Villa FC	Toledo, Ohio	Paul Hotmer Field	2017	2021	(United States) Mathius Johnson
Central Conference	Valley Division	West Virginia United (Note: West Virginia United was previously known as West Virginia Chaos and West Virginia Alliance)	Dunbar, West Virginia	Shawnee Sports Complex	2003	2003	(United States) Dan Gribben
Central Conference	Great Lakes Division	AFC Ann Arbor	Ann Arbor, Michigan	Saline Hornet Stadium	2014	2016	(United States) Eric Rudland
Central Conference	Great Lakes Division	Flint City Bucks (Note: Flint City Bucks were known as the Mid-Michigan Bucks from 1996 to 2003 and the Michigan Bucks from 2004 to 2019)	Flint, Michigan	Atwood Stadium	1995	1996	(United States) Paul Doroh
Central Conference	Great Lakes Division	Kalamazoo FC	Kalamazoo, Michigan	Soisson-Rapacz-Clason Field	2015	2021	(United States) Shane Lyons
Central Conference	Great Lakes Division	Lansing City Football	Lansing, Michigan	Cougar Stadium	2016	2022	(United States) Marco Bernardini
Central Conference	Great Lakes Division	Midwest United FC	Grand Rapids, Michigan	Aquinas College	1990	2022	(England) Luke Ruff
Central Conference	Great Lakes Division	Oakland County FC	Clawson, Michigan	Clawson Stadium	2015	2020*	(England) Steve Walker
Central Conference	Great Lakes Division	Union FC Macomb	Macomb Township, Michigan	Romeo High School	2024	2024	(United States) Gronthik Chatterjee
Central Conference	Heartland Division	Chicago Dutch Lions FC	River Forest, Illinois	Dominican University	2020	2022	(United States) Orin Gilchrist
Central Conference	Heartland Division	Edgewater Castle FC	Chicago, Illinois	Winnemac Park	2017	2026	(Turkey) Duygu Erdoğan
Central Conference	Heartland Division	Minneapolis City SC	Minneapolis, Minnesota	Edor Nelson Field	2016	2022	(United States) Justin Oliver
Central Conference	Heartland Division	River Light FC	Aurora, Illinois	Vago Field	2020	2024	(Puerto Rico) David Cabán
Central Conference	Heartland Division	RKC Third Coast	Racine, Wisconsin	Pritchard Park Multi-Purpose Field	2023	2023	(United States) Gabe Hall
Central Conference	Heartland Division	Rochester FC	Rochester, Minnesota	RCTC Stadium	2018	2023	(Colombia) Sebastian Narvarez
Central Conference	Heartland Division	Rockford Raptors FC	Rockford, Illinois	Mercyhealth Sportscore Two	1994	2026	(United States) Dimitri Tsoukalas
Central Conference	Heartland Division	St. Croix Legends	Stillwater, Minnesota	Stillwater Area High School	1984	2022	(United States) Tyler Oliver
Central Conference	Heartland Division	Sueño FC	Joliet, Illinois	Joliet Memorial Stadium	2023	2024	(Scotland) Matt Pearson
Central Conference	Great Plains Division	FC Ambush	Creve Coeur, Missouri	Missouri Baptist University	2013	2025	(United States) Jeff Locker
Central Conference	Great Plains Division	Des Moines Menace	Des Moines, Iowa	Valley Stadium	1994	1994	(United States) Charlie Latshaw III
Central Conference	Great Plains Division	Peoria City	Peoria, Illinois	Shea Stadium	2020	2020*	(United States) Mike Paye
Central Conference	Great Plains Division	Santafé Wanderers FC	Kansas City, Kansas	Durwood Soccer Stadium	1995	2025	(Honduras) Jallan Flores
Central Conference	Great Plains Division	Springfield FC	Springfield, Illinois	Sacred Heart-Griffin High School	2011	2025	(Turkey) Cuneyt Barutcu
Central Conference	Great Plains Division	Sunflower State FC	Overland Park, Kansas	Blue Valley Northwest High School	2019	2025	(United States) Nick McDonald
Southern Conference	South Central Division	Apotheos FC	Atlanta, Georgia	Atlanta Silverbacks Park	2021	2025	(United States) Jonathan Mercado
Southern Conference	South Central Division	Birmingham Legion 2	Birmingham, Alabama	Spain Park High School; Protective Stadium	2024	2024	(Canada) Carlo Schiavoni
Southern Conference	South Central Division	Columbus United FC	Columbus, Georgia	A.J. McClung Memorial Stadium	2023	2025	(United States) Brett Teach
Southern Conference	South Central Division	Dothan United Dragons	Dothan, Alabama	Rip Hewes Stadium	2024	2024	(England) Carl Reynolds
Southern Conference	South Central Division	East Atlanta FC	Atlanta, Georgia	Friends Field	2019	2020*	(England) Sam Walker
Southern Conference	South Central Division	Montgomery United FC	Montgomery, Alabama	Emory Folmar YMCA Championship Stadium	2024	2025	(England) Tate Dean
Southern Conference	South Central Division	SSA Swarm FC	Dallas, Georgia	North Paulding High School	2012	2020*	(England) Jack Collison
Southern Conference	Southeast Division	Brave SC (Note: Brave SC was known as The Villages SC from 2016 to 2023)	Summerfield, Florida	Brave Sporting Complex	2016	2016	(Brazil) Anderson DaSilva
Southern Conference	Southeast Division	Brooke House FC	Maitland, Florida	Showalter Field	2022	2024	(England) Niall O'Grady
Southern Conference	Southeast Division	Inter Gainesville KF	Gainesville, Florida	University of Florida Southwest Recreation Center	2021	2024	(United States) Sebastian Del Rio
Southern Conference	Southeast Division	NONA FC	Orlando, Florida	Austin Tindall Soccer Complex	2021	2022	(Brazil) Bruno Jaeger
Southern Conference	Southeast Division	Shark Coast FC	New Smyrna Beach, Florida	New Smyrna Beach Sports Complex	2024	2026	(United States) Nate Monsanto
Southern Conference	Southeast Division	Sporting JAX	Jacksonville, Florida	Mandarin High School	2023	2025	(United States) Sean Bubb
Southern Conference	South Florida Division	Brevard SC	Melbourne, Florida	Melbourne Central Catholic High School	2020	2023	(United States) Adrian Moreno
Southern Conference	South Florida Division	FC Miami City	Lauderhill, Florida	Central Broward Park	2014	2014	(Colombia) Julian Pedraza
Southern Conference	South Florida Division	Fort Lauderdale United FC	Fort Lauderdale, Florida	Beyond Bancard Field at NSU Florida	2023	2025	(United States) Anthony Vuono (United States) Marc Lue Young
Southern Conference	South Florida Division	Lakeland United FC	Lakeland, Florida	Bryant Stadium	2020	2026	(Brazil) Adrianinho
Southern Conference	South Florida Division	Miami AC	Miami, Florida	Tropical Park Stadium	2021	2022	(Canada) Gennaro Angelillo
Southern Conference	South Florida Division	Weston FC	Weston, Florida	Weston Regional Park	1998	2017	(Venezuela) Luis Mendoza
Southern Conference	Mid South Division	Hattiesburg FC	Hattiesburg, Mississippi	Tatum Park Soccer Fields	1980	2024	(United States) Guilherme Avila
Southern Conference	Mid South Division	Jackson Boom	Jackson, Tennessee	University School of Jackson	2022	2026	(Honduras) Briamst Castro
Southern Conference	Mid South Division	Little Rock Rangers	Little Rock, Arkansas	War Memorial Stadium	2016	2016	(South Africa) Nick Doyle
Southern Conference	Mid South Division	Louisiana Krewe FC	Lafayette, Louisiana	Ragin' Cajuns Soccer/Track Facility	2019	2022	(Spain) Joan Oliva
Southern Conference	Mid South Division	Memphis FC	Memphis, Tennessee	Mike Rose Soccer Complex	2025	2026	(United States) Daniel Ridenhour
Southern Conference	Mid South Division	Mississippi Brilla	Clinton, Mississippi	Clinton High School	2006	2007	(Uganda) Michael Azira
Southern Conference	Mid South Division	Red River Raiders FC	Shreveport, Louisiana	Airline High School	2025	2025	(United States) Bryan Turner
Southern Conference	Lone Star Division	AC Houston Sur	Houston, Texas	The Village School	2021	2022	(United States) Amr Neamatalla
Southern Conference	Lone Star Division	AHFC Royals	Houston, Texas	Campbell Road Sports Park	2017	2018	(England) James Clarkson
Southern Conference	Lone Star Division	Global Football Innovation Academy	Spring, Texas	GFI Performance Center	2023	2025	(United States) Ron Dennie
Southern Conference	Lone Star Division	Hill Country Lobos	Kyle, Texas	Bob Shelton Stadium	1996	2024	(Spain) Jonas Hunt
Southern Conference	Lone Star Division	Houston FC	Houston, Texas	Sorrels Field	2017	2017	(United States) Bruce Talbot
Southern Conference	Lone Star Division	Laredo Heat SC	Laredo, Texas	PEG Energy Stadium	2004	2004/2025	(Mexico) Johnny Ibarra
Southern Conference	Lone Star Division	Lonestar SC	Austin, Texas	St. Andrew's Episcopal School	2004	2025	(United States) Rob Dennie
Southern Conference	Lone Star Division	San Antonio FC 2	San Antonio, Texas	Rico's STAR Soccer Complex	2026	2026	(Colombia) Camilo Botero
Southern Conference	Lone Star Division	Twin City Toucans FC	Bryan, Texas	Edible Field	2017	2017	(Republic of Ireland) Steo Cummins
Southern Conference	Ranger Division	Denton Diablos FC	Denton, Texas	Mean Green Soccer Stadium	2018	2025	(United States) Roy Lassiter
Southern Conference	Ranger Division	Fort Worth Vaqueros FC	Fort Worth, Texas	Doskocil Stadium	2013	2026	(Wales) Tony Merola
Southern Conference	Ranger Division	Lubbock Matadors SC	Lubbock, Texas	Lowery Field	2021	2026	(England) David Ormiston
Southern Conference	Ranger Division	McKinney Chupacabras FC	McKinney, Texas	Ron Poe Stadium	2024	2025	(Canada) Frank Yallop
Southern Conference	Ranger Division	Texoma FC	Sherman, Texas	Munson Stadium	2023	2026	(England) Ben Clarvis
Southern Conference	Ranger Division	West Texas FC	Midland, Texas	Astound Broadband Stadium	2008	2026	(Australia) Scotty Murray
Western Conference	Mountain Division	Albion SC Colorado	Boulder, Colorado	Fairview High School; Peak to Peak Charter School	2021	2023	(England) Dave Carver
Western Conference	Mountain Division	Atlético Unión	Greeley, Colorado	District 6 Stadium	2025	2026	(United States) Jack Dickhausen
Western Conference	Mountain Division	Colorado International Soccer Academy	Aurora, Colorado	Englewood High School	2012	2022	(United States) Camilo Valencia
Western Conference	Mountain Division	Colorado Storm	Denver, Colorado	Regis Match Pitch	1967	2025	(United States) Danny Bills
Western Conference	Mountain Division	Flatirons FC	Arvada, Colorado	North Stadium	1998	2020*	(United States) Levi Rossi
Western Conference	Mountain Division	Real Colorado	Meridan, Colorado	Real Colorado Soccer Complex	1986	2026	(United States) Peter May
Western Conference	Mountain Division	Utah United	Orem, Utah	Clyde Field	2023	2024	(United States) Mark Davis
Western Conference	Northwest Division	Ballard FC	Seattle, Washington	Interbay Stadium / Memorial Stadium	2021	2022	(Venezuela) Pedro Millan
Western Conference	Northwest Division	Bigfoot FC	Maple Valley, Washington	Tahoma High School	2024	2025	(England) Paul McIlvenny
Western Conference	Northwest Division	FC Olympia	Olympia, Washington	Well 80 Pitch	2014	2022	(Saudi Arabia) Seyti Sidibay
Western Conference	Northwest Division	Midlakes United	Bellevue, Washington	Bellevue College Soccer Field	2023	2024	(Australia) Felix Vu
Western Conference	Northwest Division	Portland Bangers FC	Portland, Oregon	Lents Park	2025	2025	(United States) Jorge Villafaña
Western Conference	Northwest Division	Snohomish United	Snohomish, Washington	Stocker Fields	2024	2025	(United States) Anthony Sardon
Western Conference	Northwest Division	Tacoma Stars	Tacoma, Washington	Bellarmine Preparatory School	2003	2024	(Spain) Nick Perera
Western Conference	Northwest Division	West Seattle Junction FC	Seattle, Washington	Nino Cantu Southwest Athletic Complex	2023	2024	(United States) Mike Mata
Western Conference	NorCal Division	Academica SC	Turlock, California	Academica Field	1972	2023	(United States) Desmond Madrigal
Western Conference	NorCal Division	Almaden FC	Almaden Valley, California	Pioneer High School	1967	2024	(United States) Michael Aspinall
Western Conference	NorCal Division	Davis Legacy SC	Davis, California	Davis Legacy Stadium	1989	2022	(United States) Mark Torguson
Western Conference	NorCal Division	Marin FC Legends	Marin County, California	San Rafael High School	2004	2022	(United States) Josh Kalkstein
Western Conference	NorCal Division	Project 51O	Oakland, California	UCSF Health Training Facility	2020	2021	(United States) David Cordova Marroquin
Western Conference	NorCal Division	San Francisco City FC	San Francisco, California	Kezar Stadium	2001	2016	(Turkmenistan) Berdi Merdanov
Western Conference	NorCal Division	San Francisco Glens SC	San Francisco, California	Skyline College	1961	2018	(United States) Javier Ayala-Hil
Western Conference	NorCal Division	San Juan SC	Rancho Cordova, California	Folsom Lake College	1978	2025	(Nigeria) Amobi Okugo
Western Conference	Southwest Division	AMSG FC	Westminster, California	Boswell Stadium	2017	2024	(United States) Ismaiel Alkayali
Western Conference	Southwest Division	Capo FC	San Juan Capistrano, California	JSerra Catholic High School	2006	2023	(Scotland) Conor Ward
Western Conference	Southwest Division	City SC	Carlsbad, California	The Stadium at Canyon Crest Academy	1981	2025	(United States) Paul Ritchie
Western Conference	Southwest Division	FC Tucson	Tucson, Arizona	Kino North Sports Complex	2010	2012/2023	(Colombia) Sebastian Pineda
Western Conference	Southwest Division	Redlands FC	Redlands, California	Redlands High School	2022	2023	(United States) Cody Carlson
Western Conference	Southwest Division	Southern California Eagles	La Mirada, California	La Mirada High School	2001	2001	(United States) Todd Elkins
Western Conference	Southwest Division	Stars FC	Glendale, Arizona	ACU Football Field	2024	2025	(United States) Kenny Laird
Western Conference	Southwest Division	Ventura County Fusion	Ventura, California	Ventura College	2006	2007	(United States) Keith Costigan

Locations of USL League Two franchises who participated in the 2025 season.

Eastern Conference: Northeast Division Mid Atlantic Division Metropolitan Division Chesapeake Division South Atlantic Division
Central Conference: Great Forest Division Valley Division Great Lakes Division Heartland Division Great Plains Division
Southern Conference: South Central Division Southeast Division South Florida Division Mid South Division Lone Star Division
Western Conference: Mountain Division Northwest Division NorCal Division Southwest Division

Metro areas with multiple teams:

- Boston: Boston Bolts, Boston City FC
- Charlotte: Charlotte Eagles, Charlotte Independence 2
- Chicago: Chicago City Dutch Lions FC, Sueño FC
- Denver: Colorado International Soccer Academy (CISA), Colorado Storm, Flatirons Rush SC
- Detroit: Oakland County FC, Union FC Macomb
- Houston: AC Houston Sur, AHFC Royals, Houston FC
- Miami: FC Miami City, Miami AC, Weston FC
- New York City: Cedar Stars Rush, Ironbound SC, Long Island Rough Riders, Manhattan SC, Morris Elite SC , FC Motown, Staten Island ASC, Westchester Flames
- San Francisco Bay Area: Almaden FC, Marin FC Legends, Project 51O, San Francisco City FC, San Francisco Glens SC
- Seattle: Ballard FC, Bigfoot FC, Midlakes United, West Seattle Junction FC

=== Future clubs ===
Team	City	Stadium	Founded	Joining	Head coach
New England Force	Pembroke, Massachusetts	TBD	2025	2027	TBD
Fredericksburg City SC	Fredericksburg, Virginia	TBD	2026	2027	TBD
Waco USL2 Soccer	Waco, Texas	TBD	2026	2027	TBD
Virginia Development Academy	Woodbridge, Virginia	Howison Park	2015	2027	TBD

=== Expansion ===
Year	No. of teams	Teams added	Teams departed
1995	27		
1996	34	12	5
1997	30	7	11
1998	33	13	10
1999	42	18	9
2000	44	10	8
2001	45	11	12
2002	47	12	10
2003	50	13	10
2004	55	10	5
2005	54	7	8
2006	59	9	4
2007	63	10	6
2008	67	9	5
2009	68	11	10
2010	67	8	9
2011	64	10	13
2012	73	13	4
2013	64	4	13
2014	64	7	7
2015	63	9	10
2016	67	13	9
2017	72	14	11
2018	74	12	10
2019	72	12	14
2020	81	16	7
2021	75*	16	24*
2022	113	31	7
2023	122	20	13
2024	128	19	13
2025	144	32	14
2026	158	26	12

- 16 teams were on hiatus due to the COVID-19 pandemic

== Champions ==
Season	Playoff champions	Regular season champions
USISL Premier League
1995	Richmond Kickers	San Francisco All-Blacks United
1996	Central Coast Roadrunners	Central Coast Roadrunners
USISL Premier Development Soccer League
1997	Central Coast Roadrunners	Spokane Shadow
1998	San Gabriel Valley Highlanders	Jackson Chargers
USL Premier Development League
1999	Chicago Sockers	Jackson Chargers
2000	Chicago Sockers	Mid-Michigan Bucks
2001	Westchester Flames	Calgary Storm
2002	Cape Cod Crusaders	Des Moines Menace
2003	Cape Cod Crusaders	New Orleans Shell Shockers
2004	Central Florida Kraze	Chicago Fire Reserves
2005	Des Moines Menace	Orange County Blue Star
2006	Michigan Bucks	Carolina Dynamo
2007	Laredo Heat	Hampton Roads Piranhas
2008	Thunder Bay Chill	Michigan Bucks
2009	Ventura County Fusion	Reading Rage
2010	Portland Timbers U23s	Portland Timbers U23s
2011	Kitsap Pumas	Fresno Fuego
2012	Forest City London	Michigan Bucks
2013	Austin Aztex	Thunder Bay Chill
2014	Michigan Bucks	Des Moines Menace
2015	K–W United FC	Michigan Bucks
2016	Michigan Bucks	Michigan Bucks
2017	Charlotte Eagles	New York Red Bulls U-23
2018	Calgary Foothills FC	Des Moines Menace
USL League Two
2019	Flint City Bucks	Des Moines Menace
2020	Season cancelled due to the COVID-19 pandemic	
2021	Des Moines Menace	Des Moines Menace
2022	Ventura County Fusion	Lionsbridge FC
2023	Ballard FC	Chicago City SC
2024	Seacoast United Phantoms	Seacoast United Phantoms
2025	Vermont Green	FC Motown STA
2026	Vermont Green	Minneapolis City SC

== Championships ==
(Defunct teams in italics)

=== Playoff championships ===
Rank	Team	Wins	Years
1	Flint City Bucks	4	2006, 2014, 2016, 2019
2	Central Coast Roadrunners	2	1996, 1997
2	Chicago Sockers	2	1999, 2000
2	Cape Cod Crusaders	2	2002, 2003
2	Des Moines Menace	2	2005, 2021
2	Ventura County Fusion	2	2009, 2022
2	Vermont Green	2	2025, 2026
8	Richmond Kickers	1	1995
8	San Gabriel Valley Highlanders	1	1998
8	Westchester Flames	1	2001
8	Central Florida Kraze	1	2004
8	Laredo Heat	1	2007
8	Thunder Bay Chill	1	2008
8	Portland Timbers U23s	1	2010
8	Kitsap Pumas	1	2011
8	Forest City London	1	2012
8	Austin Aztex	1	2013
8	K-W United FC	1	2015
8	Charlotte Eagles	1	2017
8	Calgary Foothills FC	1	2018
8	Ballard FC	1	2023
8	Seacoast United Phantoms	1	2024

=== Regular season championships ===
Rank	Team	Wins	Years
1	Flint City Bucks	5	2000, 2008, 2012, 2015, 2016
1	Des Moines Menace	5	2002, 2014, 2018, 2019, 2021
3	Jackson Chargers	2	1998, 1999
4	San Francisco All-Blacks United	1	1995
4	Central Coast Roadrunners	1	1996
4	Spokane Shadow	1	1997
4	Calgary Storm	1	2001
4	New Orleans Shell Shockers	1	2003
4	Chicago Fire Reserves	1	2004
4	Orange County Blue Star	1	2005
4	Carolina Dynamo	1	2006
4	Hampton Roads Piranhas	1	2007
4	Reading Rage	1	2009
4	Portland Timbers U23s	1	2010
4	Fresno Fuego	1	2011
4	Thunder Bay Chill	1	2013
4	New York Red Bulls U-23	1	2017
4	Lionsbridge FC	1	2022
4	Chicago City SC	1	2023
4	Seacoast United Phantoms	1	2024
4	FC Motown STA	1	2025

== MVPs ==
Season	Player	Club	College
1995	(United States) Gabe Jones	Austin Lone Stars	Davidson
1996	(Finland) Pasi Kinturi	Nashville Metros	Campbell University (TN)
1997	(Trinidad and Tobago) Lester Felicia	Jackson Chargers	Bellhaven University (MS)
1998	(Brazil) Rodrigo Costa	Detroit Dynamite	Union College (KY)
1999	(Germany) Fabio Eidelwein	Sioux City Breeze	St. Edward's University (TX)
2000	(Mexico) Fernando Salazar	San Fernando Valley Heroes	N/A
2001	(United States) Beau Brown	Lafayette Lightning	West Texas A&M
2002	(Czech Republic) Tomas Boltnar	Des Moines Menace	California University of Pennsylvania
2003	(Czech Republic) Tomas Boltnar	Des Moines Menace	California University of Pennsylvania
2004	(United States) Ruben Mingo	South Jersey Barons	Mercer County Community College (NJ)
2005	(Mexico) Daniel Frias	El Paso Patriots	N/A
2006	(Canada) Frederico Moojen	Augusta FireBall	Lincoln Memorial University (TN)
2007	(Brazil) Pablo Campos	Fresno Fuego	Fresno Pacific University
2008	(Mexico) Junior Garcia	Yakima Reds	Wenatchee Valley College (WA)
2009	(United States) Aaron Wheeler	Reading Rage	Lenoir–Rhyne University (NC)
2010	(United States) Brent Richards	Portland Timbers U23s	University of Washington
2011	(United States) Milton Blanco	Fresno Fuego	Fresno Pacific University
2012	(Brazil) Sullivan Silva	Thunder Bay Chill	Oklahoma Baptist
2013	(United States) Kris Tyrpak	Austin Aztex	Houston Baptist
2014	(Bosnia and Herzegovina) Dzenan Catic	Michigan Bucks	Davenport University (MI)
2015	(Jamaica) Anthony Grant	Seacoast United Phantoms	Bowling Green State University
2016	(Jamaica) Chevaughn Walsh	Ocean City Nor'easters	Jefferson College (MO)
2017	(United States) Brian White	New York Red Bulls U-23	Duke University
2018	(Japan) Ryosuke Kinoshita	Des Moines Menace	Marshalltown Community College (IA)
2019	(England) Deri Corfe	Ocean City Nor'easters	Wright State
2020	Season cancelled due to the COVID-19 pandemic		
2021	(Argentina) Nicolás Molina	West Virginia United	University of North Carolina Wilmington
2022	(Trinidad and Tobago) Samory Powder	Hudson Valley Hammers	University of Detroit Mercy
2023	(United States) Logan Farrington	Ventura County Fusion	Oregon State University
2024	(United States) Alec Hughes	Western Mass Pioneers	UMass Minutemen
2025	(Saint Lucia) Donavan Phillip	Flint City Bucks	NC State Wolfpack
