= 2000 PDL season =

USL Premier Development League
- Season: 2000
- Champions: Chicago Sockers (2nd title)
- Regular Season Champions: Mid-Michigan Bucks (1st title)
- Matches: 384
- Goals: 1,652 (4.3 per match)
- Best Player: (Mexico) Fernando Salazar San Fernando Valley Heroes
- Top goalscorer: (Kenya) Bonaventure Maruti Mid-Michigan Bucks (22 goals)
- Best goalkeeper: (United States) Adam Throop Chicago Sockers

The 2000 USL Premier Development League season was the 6th PDL season. The season began in April 2000 and ended in August 2000.

Chicago Sockers finished the season as national champions, beating Mid-Michigan Bucks 1–0 in the PDL Championship game. Westchester Flames had finished with the best regular season record in the league, winning 15 out of their 18 games, suffering just three losses, and finishing with a +26 goal difference.

== Changes from the 1999 season ==
=== Rules ===
This is the first year that the PDL used ties in the standings, whereas previous seasons employed a shootout.

=== Name changes ===
The following teams changed their name:

- The West Michigan Explosion became the West Michigan Edge.

=== New teams ===
10 New teams were added, including 8 expansion teams:

Team name	Metro area	Location	Previous affiliation
Alabama Saints	Birmingham area	Birmingham, AL	returned from hiatus
(Colorado) Boulder Nova	Boulder area	Boulder, CO	expansion
(Florida) Broward County Wolfpack	Broward County area	Fort Lauderdale, FL	expansion
(Ohio) Dayton Gems	Dayton Area	Dayton, OH	expansion
(New Jersey) New Brunswick Brigade	New Brunswick area	New Brunswick, NJ	expansion
(New Jersey) North Jersey Imperials	North Jersey area	Paramus, NJ	from D3 Pro League
(Florida) Palm Beach Pumas	Palm Beach area	Palm Beach, FL	expansion
South Florida Future	Southwest Florida area	Sarasota, FL	returned from hiatus
(Florida) Tampa Bay Hawks	Tampa Bay Area	Palm Harbor, FL	expansion
(Ontario) Thunder Bay Chill	Thunder Bay Area	Thunder Bay, Ontario	expansion

=== Folding ===
Eight teams folded before the season:

- Clarksville Gunners
- Jackson Chargers
- Miami Tango
- New York Capital District Shockers
- Orlando Nighthawks
- Silicon Valley Ambassadors
- Sioux City Breeze
- Tucson Amigos

== Standings ==
Legend
Division champion
Team qualified for playoff berth
Regular season champion and bye into PDL Semifinals.

=== Central Conference ===
==== Great Lakes Division ====
Pos	Team	Pld	W	L	T	GF	GA	GD	BP	Pts
1	Mid-Michigan Bucks (R)	18	14	3	1	64	21	+43	14	71
2	Dayton Gems	18	9	8	1	37	35	+2	7	44
3	West Michigan Edge	18	9	9	0	32	38	−6	7	43
4	Kalamazoo Kingdom	18	9	9	0	37	37	0	7	43
5	Indiana Invaders	18	8	10	0	35	43	−8	5	37
6	Lexington Bluegrass Bandits	18	5	13	0	26	47	−21	5	25

(R) Regular Season Champions

==== Heartland Division ====
Pos	Team	Pld	W	L	T	GF	GA	GD	BP	Pts
1	Chicago Sockers	18	13	5	0	45	17	+28	10	62
2	Rockford Raptors	18	9	7	2	38	35	+3	8	46
3	Des Moines Menace	18	10	8	0	63	28	+35	5	45
4	Wisconsin Rebels	18	9	8	1	34	25	+9	6	43
5	Twin Cities Tornado	18	7	9	2	26	33	−7	2	32
6	Thunder Bay Chill	18	4	13	1	20	49	−29	2	19

==== Provisional Teams ====
Pos	Team	Pld	W	L	T	GF	GA	GD	BP	Pts
1	Louisiana Outlaws (Note: Provisional teams are not eligible for playoffs)	12	5	5	2	25	25	0	5	27
2	Alabama Saints	7	1	4	2	6	14	−8	1	7
3	Central Jersey Riptide	10	1	9	0	10	31	−21	1	5

=== Eastern Conference ===
==== Northeast Division ====
Pos	Team	Pld	W	L	T	GF	GA	GD	BP	Pts
1	Westchester Flames	18	15	3	0	47	21	+26	10	70
2	Vermont Voltage	18	11	6	1	37	22	+15	8	53
3	New York Freedom	18	10	7	1	45	24	+21	8	49
4	Brooklyn Knights	18	9	8	1	30	32	−2	4	41
5	North Jersey Imperials	18	7	11	0	38	49	−11	6	34
6	New Brunswick Brigade	18	2	15	1	22	56	−34	1	10

==== Southeast Division ====
Pos	Team	Pld	W	L	T	GF	GA	GD	BP	Pts
1	Tampa Bay Hawks	18	12	5	1	52	35	+17	9	58
2	Bradenton Academics	18	11	6	1	43	27	+16	8	53
3	Cocoa Expos	18	11	6	1	38	27	+11	6	51
4	Central Florida Kraze	18	10	6	2	46	34	+12	8	50
5	Palm Beach Pumas	18	8	8	2	39	43	−4	7	41
6	South Florida Future	18	8	10	0	30	43	−13	3	35
7	Broward County Wolfpack	18	4	12	2	36	56	−20	7	25
8	Miami Breakers	18	3	14	1	27	46	−19	5	18

=== Western Conference ===
==== Rocky Mountain Division ====
Pos	Team	Pld	W	L	T	GF	GA	GD	BP	Pts
1	Colorado Comets	18	12	5	1	51	29	+22	7	56
2	Wichita Jets	18	8	8	2	46	60	−14	7	41
3	Boulder Nova	18	8	9	1	38	32	+6	7	40
4	Kansas City Brass	18	5	11	2	41	56	−15	6	28
5	Colorado Springs Stampede	18	5	11	2	27	46	−19	3	25

==== Northwest Division ====
Pos	Team	Pld	W	L	T	GF	GA	GD	BP	Pts
1	Yakima Reds	18	12	5	1	59	29	+30	11	60
2	Spokane Shadow	18	11	4	3	43	36	+7	7	54
3	Seattle Sounders Select	18	11	6	1	33	28	+5	6	51
4	Abbotsford 86ers Select	18	8	9	1	49	44	+5	9	42
5	Cascade Surge	18	5	11	2	34	28	+6	6	28
6	Willamette Valley Firebirds	18	3	15	0	28	71	−43	4	16

==== Southwest Division ====
Pos	Team	Pld	W	L	T	GF	GA	GD	BP	Pts
1	San Fernando Valley Heroes	18	11	7	0	57	48	+9	12	56
2	Central Coast Roadrunners	18	11	7	0	51	39	+12	9	53
3	Nevada Zephyrs	18	7	11	0	32	43	−11	4	32
4	San Gabriel Valley Highlanders	18	4	14	0	35	66	−31	4	20

== Playoffs ==
=== Format ===
Mid-Michigan won the PDL Regular Season title and a bye to the National Semi-Finals. This moved Dayton up to the Great Lakes Division first place spot and allowed West Michigan into the playoffs, taking the second place spot for the division.

For the Central and Eastern divisions, the top seeds from each division face the second place team from the opposite division. For the Western Conference, the division champion with the most points will play the wild card, while the two remaining division champions play each other.

=== Conference playoffs ===
Central Semifinals
HL1	(Illinois) Chicago Sockers	6
GL2	West Michigan Edge	0
GL1	(Ohio) Dayton Gems	1
HL2	(Illinois) Rockford Raptors	0

Central Finals
HL1	(Illinois) Chicago Sockers	2
GL1	(Ohio) Dayton Gems	0

Central Conference Playoffs
August 4, 2000
6:30 PM
Conference Semifinal

(Illinois) Rockford Raptors	0–1	(Ohio) Dayton Gems
	Report	55' Jack Cummings

Forest View Park
Arlington Heights, Illinois
August 4, 2000
8:30 PM
Conference Semifinal

(Illinois) Chicago Sockers	6–0	West Michigan Edge
Rodrigo Costa; Hernan Campuzano

Forest View Park
Arlington Heights, Illinois
August 5, 2000
9:00 PM
Central Conference Final

(Illinois) Chicago Sockers	2–0	(Ohio) Dayton Gems

Forest View Park
Arlington Heights, Illinois

Eastern Semifinals
NE1	(New York (state)) Westchester Flames	1
SE2	(Florida) Bradenton Academics	0
SE1	(Florida) Tampa Bay Hawks (AET/PSO)	2 (4)
NE2	Vermont Voltage	2 (2)

Eastern Finals
NE1	(New York (state)) Westchester Flames	1
SE1	(Florida) Tampa Bay Hawks	0

Eastern Conference Playoffs
August 5, 2000
3:00 PM
Conference Semifinal

(Florida) Tampa Bay Hawks	2–2 (a.e.t.)	Vermont Voltage
		Chris Baum
Penalties
	4–2

IMG Academy
Bradenton, Florida
August 5, 2000
5:00 PM
Conference Semifinal

(Florida) Bradenton Academics	0–1	(New York (state)) Westchester Flames
		55' Ernest Inneh

IMG Academy
Bradenton, Florida
August 6, 2000
5:00 PM
Eastern Conference Final

(New York (state)) Westchester Flames	1–0	(Florida) Tampa Bay Hawks
Chris Wingert 65'

IMG Academy
Bradenton, Florida

Western Semifinals
NW	(Washington (state)) Yakima Reds	2
WC	(Washington (state)) Spokane Shadow	0
RM	Colorado Comets	4
SW	(California) San Fernando Valley Heroes	1

Western Finals
NW	(Washington (state)) Yakima Reds	1
RM	Colorado Comets	0

Western Conference Playoffs
August 5, 2000
9:00 PM
Conference Semifinal

Colorado Comets	4–1	(California) San Fernando Valley Heroes
	Report	75' Ricardo Salazar

Joe Albi Stadium
Spokane, Washington
August 5, 2000
11:00 PM
Conference Semifinal

(Washington (state)) Spokane Shadow	0–2	(Washington (state)) Yakima Reds
Garth Cummings (yellow card) 45' (yellow-red card)	Report	(red card) 70' Joe Bensch; 77' Aaron Heinzen; 87' Grant Falco

Joe Albi Stadium
Spokane, Washington
Attendance: 1,005
August 6, 2000
9:00 PM
Western Conference Final

(Washington (state)) Yakima Reds	1–0	Colorado Comets
Mike Pardini 36'

Joe Albi Stadium
Spokane, Washington

=== PDL championship ===
PDL Semifinals
PDL	Mid-Michigan Bucks	5
NW	(Washington (state)) Yakima Reds	2
NE1	(New York (state)) Westchester Flames	0
HL1	(Illinois) Chicago Sockers	5

PDL Finals
PDL	Mid-Michigan Bucks	0
HL1	(Illinois) Chicago Sockers	1
PDL Third Place
NW	(Washington (state)) Yakima Reds	2
NE1	(New York (state)) Westchester Flames	5

PDL National Semifinals
August 11, 2000
7:00 PM EDT

Mid-Michigan Bucks	5–2	(Washington (state)) Yakima Reds
Bonaventure Maruti 3'; Tino Scicluna (yellow card) 27'; Paul Snape 34', 52', 58'; Justin Detter 88'	Report	(yellow card) 44' Jason Timm; 53' John Schefter; (yellow card) 58' John Maloney; 90' Machado

White Pine Stadium
Saginaw Township, Michigan
Attendance: 526

August 11, 2000
9:00 PM EDT

(New York (state)) Westchester Flames	0–5	(Illinois) Chicago Sockers
Joseph Afful (yellow card) 42'; Dusan Erceg (yellow card) 72'	Report	23', 52' Lee Paul; 35' (o.g.) Richard Bradley; 53', 58' Hamid Mehreioskouei

White Pine Stadium
Saginaw Township, Michigan

Third Place Game
August 12, 2000
6:00 PM EDT

(New York (state)) Westchester Flames	5–2	(Washington (state)) Yakima Reds
Ernest Inneh 19', 72', 76', 88'; Dusan Erceg (yellow card) 50'; Nick Sellas 89'	Report	8' John Schefter; (yellow card) 33' John Maloney; (yellow card) 54' Nate Nelson; 83' Luiz Marcelo Machado

White Pine Stadium
Saginaw Township, Michigan

PDL Championship Game
August 12, 2000
8:00 PM EDT

Mid-Michigan Bucks	0–1	(Illinois) Chicago Sockers
Joe Malachino (yellow card) 9'; Paul Snape (yellow card) 26'; Tino Scicluna (yellow card) 60'	Report	61' Rodrigo Costa

White Pine Stadium
Saginaw Township, Michigan
Attendance: 1,220

Championship MVP: (United States) Adam Throop CHI

== Awards ==
=== Year End Awards ===
Scoring Champion: (Armenia) Arshak Abyanli (San Fernando Valley Heroes) 51 Points (18 Goals, 15 Assists)
Golden Boot: (Kenya) Bonaventure Maruti (Mid-Michigan Bucks)
(22 Goals)
Assists Champion: (Armenia) Arshak Abyanli (San Fernando Valley Heroes) (15 Assists)
MVP: (Mexico) Fernando Salazar (San Fernando Valley Heroes)
Rookie of the Year: (United States) Ryan Trout (Kalamazoo Kingdom)
Defender of the Year: (United States) Nate Nelson (Yakima Reds)
Goalkeeper of the Year: (United States) Adam Throop (Chicago Sockers)
Coach of the Year: (United States) Joe Malachino (Mid-Michigan Bucks)

=== Weekly awards ===
Player of the Week
Week	Player	Club	Position	Reason	Ref.
1	(United States) Kris Stumpf	Colorado Comets	Forward	2 goals in 45 minutes of action in 6–2 rout vs Kansas City Brass	
2	(United States) Brian Biffle	Boulder Nova	Forward	Scored two goals off bench, including game-winner vs Colorado Spring Ascent	
3	(United States) Garth Cummings	Spokane Shadow	Forward	scoring three goals in a win and a tie during the team’s opening weekend vs Cascade Surge and Seattle Sounders Select	
4	(Kenya) Bonaventure Maruti	Mid-Michigan Bucks	Forward	scoring three goals in a win and a tie during the team’s opening weekend vs Cascade Surge and Seattle Sounders Select	
5	(United States) Ian Chursky	Seattle Sounders Select	Forward	4 goals in pair of wins at over Yakima Reds and Willamette Valley Firebirds	
6	(United States) Jared Raftery	Dayton Gems	Forward	Hat-tricks in 2 games, 2 as second half sub	
7	(Guinea) Aboubacar Camara	New York Freedoms	Forward	hat trick vs Central Jersey Riptide	
8	(Kenya) Bonaventure Maruti	Mid-Michigan Bucks	Forward	Two-goal games in all three wins vs Kalamazoo Kingdom, Lexington Bluegrass Bandits, and Jerry D's	
9	(United States) Geoff Peattie	Tampa Bay Hawks	Forward	4 goals in win over Central Florida Kraze	
10	(Brazil) Marcone DeOliveira	Palm Beach Pumas	Forward	Two goals, winner short three men, in 2-1 win vs Miami Breakers	
11	(United States) Maher Kayali	Colorado Comets	Midfielder	Four-goal game, two game-winners in two wins vs Wichita Jets and Boulder Nova	
12	(United States) Danny Risch	Central Coast Roadrunners	Forward	hat trick over D3 Stanislaus United Cruisers	
13	(United States) Kenny Krestian	Spokane Shadow	Defender	Goal, 2 assists in 5-2 win over Abbotsford 86ers Select	
14	(Armenia) Arshak Abyanli	San Fernando Valley Heroes	Forward	4 goals, hat-trick, 2 assists in two wins against the Nevada Zephyrs	
15	(United States) Sam Skeels	West Michigan Edge	Midfielder	Hat-trick in 3-0 win over Indiana Invaders for playoff berth	

Team of the Week
Week	Goalkeeper	Defenders	Midfielders	Forwards	Ref.
1	(United States) Drew (BOU)	(United States) Gorosito (MIA) (United States) Edwinson (COL) (United States) Buchmueller (KCB)	(United States) Osborne (BOU) (Argentina) Yalet (MIA) (United States) Mersereau (COS) (United States) Iesberts (SGV)	(United States) Brodsky (COL) (United States) Stumpf (COL) (United States) Barton (COS)	
2	(United States) Drew (BOU)	(United States) Hansen (COL) (United States) Reed (CFK) (United States) McLaughlin (BOU)	(United States) Salazar (SFV) (Peru) Cubillas (SFF) (United States) Cushing (WIC)	(United States) Biffle (BOU) (Armenia) Akopian (SFV) (Armenia) Abyanli (SFV) (United States) Cummings (KCB)	
3	(United States) DoBay (WIS)	(United States) Huet (SPO) (Brazil) Machado (YAK) (United States) Chirinos (MIA)	(United States) Resende (YAK) (Syria) Kayali (COL) (United States) McIntosh (CFK) (United States) Modersohn (DMM)	(United States) Rodriguez (IND) (United States) Cummings (SPO) (United States) Josepg (SFF)	
5	(United States) Mellis (BRO)	(United States) Hall (MMB) (United States) Barone (KAL) (United States) Edwinson (COL)	(United States) McIntosh (CFK) (United States) Rausenberger (BRD) (United States) Delgado (CCR) (Canada) Scigliano (ABB)	(United States) Chursky (SSS) (Liberia) Carver (CHI) (United States) Navarette (WES)	
6	(United States) Pogue (MMB)	(United States) Henning (WIS) (United States) Prego (NJI) (United States) DaSilva (CFK)	(Mexico) Stumpf (COL) (United States) Kingsley (YAK) (United States) Robey (DAY) (United States) Chan (SFF)	(United States) Raftery (DAY) (Federal Republic of Yugoslavia) Vučković (VER) (United States) Bleyenburg (KCB)	
7	(Sweden) Tanzer (SSS)	(United States) Borman (BRD) (United States) Hall (MMB) (United States) Feller (KAL)	(Malaysia) Chan (COA) (United States) Trout (KAL) (United States) Moore (BRD) (United States) Somoza (SSS)	(Guinea) Camara (NYF) (United States) Foisie (YAK) (United States) Roff (IND)	
8	(United States) Tate (IND)	(United States) Husenovich (BRO) (United States) Hall (MMB) (United States) Sorenson (TCT)	(Federal Republic of Yugoslavia) Vučković (VER) (Syria) Kayali (COL) (United States) Kingsley (YAK) (United States) Case (CFK)	(Kenya) Maruti (MMB) (Armenia) Abyanli (SFV) (Socialist Federal Republic of Yugoslavia) Bojovic (WES)	
9	(United States) Perkins (TBH)	(United States) Zwaschka (DMM) (United States) Branan (TCT) (United States) Gonzalez (WIC)	(United States) Leonard (KAL) (United States) Kusca (CHI) (United States) Simpson (WIS) (United States) Schomaker (MMB)	(Germany) Eidelwein (DMM) (United States) Norkus (BOU) (United States) Salazar (SFV)	
10	(United States) Hurley (PBP)	(United States) Wooten (WVF) (United States) Aelenei (SFV) (United States) Jackson (MMB)	(Chile) Espinosa (WES) (United States) Higgins (SPO) (United States) Cushing (WIC)	(Brazil) DeOliveira (PBP) (United States) Paul (CHI) (United States) Peattie (TBH) (United States) (United States) Rodriguez (MIA)	
11	(Finland) Peura (TBC)	(United States) Reger (PBP) (United States) Houck (SPO) (United States) Cannon (CFK)	(United States) Salazar (SFV) (Nigeria) Inneh (WES) (United States) Kayali (FWF) (United States) Kingsley (YAK)	(United States) Mack (MMD) (United States) Quinn (BRD) (Germany) Eidelwein (DMM)	
12	(United States) Cameron (BRA)	(United States) Plunkett (COA) (United States) Ray (BOU) (Puerto Rico) Vélez (BRA)	(United States) Adjanohouh (LOU) (United States) Kingsley (YAK) (South Africa) Tenoff (DAY) (United States) Higgins (SPO)	(United States) Namoff (ROC) (United States) Nix (WIC) (United States) Risch (CCR)	
13	(United States) Bratt (ROC)	(United States) Krestian (SPO) (United States) McElderry (NYF) (United States) Coppage (KCB)	(United States) Dorrington (SPO) (United States) Harkness (CHI) (United States) Gutierrez (YAK) (United States) Chavarin (NEV)	(United States) Tabor (COL) (Federal Republic of Yugoslavia) Vučković (VER) (United States) Cerminato (CFK)	
14	(United States) Sinelnikov (IND)	(England) Hickey (NJI) (United States) Houck (SPO) (United States) Roper (SFF)	(United States) Scigliano (ABB) (Turkey) Altincatal (NJI) (United States) Reti (WIS) (United States) Dalgleish (CCR)	(Armenia) Abyanli (SFV) (Kenya) Maruti (MMB) (United States) Filing (KCB)	
15	(United States) Cosgriff (VER)	(United States) Houck (SPO) (United States) Zwaschka (DMM) (United States) Dias (VER)	(United States) Mekelburg (TBH) (Federal Republic of Yugoslavia) Mariscalco (DAY) (United States) Skeels (WME) (United States) Reti (WIS)	(United States) Foisie (YAK) (United States) Katz (CCR) (Zimbabwe) Cummins (KCB)	

=== All-League Team ===
F: (Brazil) Jose Marcone DeOliveira (ELP); (Armenia) Arshak Abyanli (SFV) (Scoring Champion and Assist Champion); (Kenya) Bonaventure Maruti (MMB) (Golden Boot)
M: (Mexico) Fernando Salazar (SFV) (League MVP); (South Africa) Godfrey Tenoff (DAY); (United States) Caleb Stoddart (COS);
D: (United States) Nate Nelson (YAK) (Defender of the Year); (United States) David Hall (MMB); (United States) Steve Herdsman (WME); (United States) Jeremy Oetman (CCR)
G: (United States) Adam Throop (CHI) (Goalkeeper of the Year)

=== All-Tournament Team ===
F: (England) Paul Snape (MMB); (Nigeria) Ernest Inneh (WES); (United States) Lee Paul (CHI)
M: (Burkina Faso) Ousmane Coulibaly (MMB); (United States) Chad Schomaker (MMB); (United States) John Schefter (YAK);
D: (Canada) Alvin Hudson (CHI); (Uruguay) Hector Navarette (WES); (United States) David Lara (CHI); (United States) Adam Heineman (MMB)
G: (United States) Adam Throop (CHI) (Championship Game MVP And Tournament MVP)
