= 2008 PDL season =

USL Premier Development League
- Season: 2008
- Champions: Thunder Bay Chill (1st Title)
- Regular Season Champions: Michigan Bucks (2nd Title)
- Matches: 536
- Goals: 1,731 (3.23 per match)
- Best Player: (Mexico) Junior Garcia Yakima Reds
- Top goalscorer: (Mexico) Junior Garcia Yakima Reds (15 Goals)
- Best goalkeeper: (Mexico) Miguel Gallardo Austin Aztex U23

The 2008 USL Premier Development League season was the 14th season of the PDL. The regular season started on April 26, 2008, and ended on July 20, 2008. The league consisted of 67 teams across 10 divisions with the addition of the Midwest and New England divisions. The playoffs began on July 22, 2008, and ended with the PDL Championship Game on August 9, 2008.

Thunder Bay Chill finished the season as national champions, beating Laredo Heat on penalty kicks after a 1–1 tie in the PDL Championship game in Laredo, Texas on 9 August 2008.

Michigan Bucks finished with the best regular season record in the league, winning 13 out of their 16 games, suffering just one loss, and finishing with a +27 goal difference.

Yakima Reds striker Junior Garcia was the league's top scorer and MVP, knocking in 15 goals. Fresno Fuego's Fabricio Codeceira led the league with 13 assists, while Austin Aztex U23 keeper Miguel Gallardo enjoyed the best goalkeeping statistics, with a goals-against average of 0.615 per game, and keeping 9 clean sheets in his 13 games.

== Changes from 2007 ==
=== Name changes ===
- Abbotsford Rangers changed their name to the Abbotsford Mariners to reflect the name of their parent organization.
- Los Angeles Storm changed their name to the Los Angeles Legends to reflect the name of their parent organization.
- The expansion Austin Stampede were renamed the Aztex U23 after the Austin Aztex USL-1 franchise was announced for 2009 and acquired controlling interest in the PDL team.

=== New franchises ===
- Nine franchises joined the league this year, including six brand new teams:

Team name	Metro area	Location	Previous affiliation
(Texas) Austin Aztex U23	Greater Austin area	Round Rock, TX	expansion
(Ohio) Cincinnati Kings	Greater Cincinnati area	Wilder, KY	relegated from USL-2
(Texas) Houston Leones	Greater Houston area	Richmond, TX	expansion
(Michigan) Kalamazoo Outrage	Kalamazoo area	Kalamazoo, MI	expansion
New Hampshire Phantoms	Hillsborough County area	Manchester, NH	relegated from USL-2
New Jersey Rangers	Northern New Jersey area	Denville, NJ	expansion
(New Jersey) Newark Ironbound Express	Newark area	Newark, NJ	expansion
(Florida) Panama City Pirates	Panama City area	Panama City Beach, FL	expansion
(British Columbia) Vancouver Whitecaps Residency	Metro Vancouver area	Burnaby, BC	transferred from PCSL

=== Folding ===
- Five teams left the league prior to the beginning of the season:
  - Albany Admirals - Schenectady, New York
  - Austin Lightning - Austin, Texas
  - Cocoa Expos - Cocoa, Florida
  - Delaware Dynasty - New Castle, Delaware
  - Sioux Falls Spitfire - Sioux Falls, South Dakota

== Final standings ==
Legend
Team won the Division Title
Team qualified for playoff berth

=== Central Conference ===
==== Great Lakes Division ====
Pos	Team	Pld	W	L	T	GF	GA	GD	Pts
1	Michigan Bucks (R)	16	13	1	2	40	13	+27	41
2	Cleveland Internationals	16	10	3	3	41	19	+22	33
3	Toronto Lynx	16	8	6	2	28	21	+7	26
4	Cincinnati Kings	16	3	10	3	14	32	−18	12
5	West Virginia Chaos	16	1	8	7	17	32	−15	10

(R) Regular Season Champions

==== Midwest Division ====
Pos	Team	Pld	W	L	T	GF	GA	GD	Pts
1	Chicago Fire Premier	16	8	2	6	26	12	+14	30
2	Kalamazoo Outrage	16	8	6	2	27	24	+3	26
3	Indiana Invaders	16	6	6	4	20	21	−1	22
4	Fort Wayne Fever	16	2	9	5	16	33	−17	11
5	West Michigan Edge	16	2	10	4	18	40	−22	10

==== Heartland Division ====
Pos	Team	Pld	W	L	T	GF	GA	GD	Pts
1	Thunder Bay Chill	16	13	2	1	42	17	+25	40
2	Colorado Rapids U23's	16	8	5	3	34	25	+9	27
3	Des Moines Menace	16	7	4	5	29	18	+11	26
4	St. Louis Lions	16	7	5	4	29	27	+2	25
5	Kansas City Brass	16	6	9	1	23	30	−7	19
6	Springfield Demize	16	0	16	0	8	48	−40	0

The top two teams in each division qualify for the playoffs. The Conference champion receives a bye into the Conference Semifinals, with the third place team from that division receiving a playoff berth.

=== Eastern Conference ===
==== Mid Atlantic Division ====
Pos	Team	Pld	W	L	T	GF	GA	GD	Pts
1	Reading Rage	16	11	3	2	32	12	+20	35
2	Fredericksburg Gunners	16	8	8	0	27	23	+4	24
3	Hampton Roads Piranhas	16	6	7	3	22	23	−1	21
4	Virginia Legacy	16	4	8	4	16	31	−15	16
5	Northern Virginia Royals	16	3	8	5	20	34	−14	14
6	Richmond Kickers Future	16	2	8	6	17	27	−10	12

==== New England Division ====
Pos	Team	Pld	W	L	T	GF	GA	GD	Pts
1	Cape Cod Crusaders	16	9	3	4	33	16	+17	31
2	Ottawa Fury	16	9	4	3	38	22	+16	30
3	Vermont Voltage	16	8	7	1	28	30	−2	25
4	New Hampshire Phantoms	16	3	9	4	14	28	−14	13
5	Rhode Island Stingrays	16	2	9	5	21	38	−17	11

==== Northeast Division ====
Pos	Team	Pld	W	L	T	GF	GA	GD	Pts
1	Brooklyn Knights	16	10	2	4	33	17	+16	34
2	Newark Ironbound Express	16	8	2	6	33	17	+16	30
3	Long Island Rough Riders	16	8	4	4	36	26	+10	28
4	Westchester Flames	16	7	7	2	30	30	0	23
5	Ocean City Barons	16	6	5	5	29	25	+4	23
6	New Jersey Rangers	16	2	12	2	12	42	−30	8

The Division Champions and the Second Place team with the most points qualify for the playoffs.

=== Southern Conference ===
==== Mid South Division ====
Pos	Team	Pld	W	L	T	GF	GA	GD	Pts
1	Austin Aztex U23	16	10	5	1	25	11	+14	31
2	Laredo Heat	16	8	4	4	33	15	+18	28
3	El Paso Patriots	16	8	5	3	22	20	+2	27
4	Mississippi Brilla	16	7	6	3	26	23	+3	24
5	Baton Rouge Capitals	16	7	8	1	20	23	−3	22
6	DFW Tornados	16	6	7	3	17	20	−3	21
7	New Orleans Shell Shockers	16	5	8	3	18	28	−10	18
8	Houston Leones	16	3	11	2	17	38	−21	11

==== Southeast Division ====
Pos	Team	Pld	W	L	T	GF	GA	GD	Pts
1	Central Florida Kraze	16	11	3	2	38	18	+20	35
2	Bradenton Academics	16	10	2	4	37	13	+24	34
3	Cary RailHawks U23's	16	9	5	2	40	29	+11	29
4	Atlanta Silverbacks U23's	16	9	6	1	38	29	+9	28
5	Panama City Pirates	16	7	6	3	35	20	+15	24
6	Carolina Dynamo	16	7	7	2	35	31	+4	23
7	Nashville Metros	16	3	13	0	12	42	−30	9
8	Palm Beach Pumas	16	1	15	0	9	62	−53	−1 (Note: Palm Beach deducted 4 points for failing to fulfil three fixtures.)

=== Western Conference ===
==== Northwest Division ====
Pos	Team	Pld	W	L	T	GF	GA	GD	Pts
1	Tacoma Tide	16	11	4	1	46	23	+23	34
2	Vancouver Whitecaps Residency	16	11	4	1	34	14	+20	34
3	Yakima Reds	16	9	6	1	31	25	+6	28
4	BYU Cougars	16	7	6	3	21	20	+1	24
5	Ogden Outlaws	16	6	8	2	18	21	−3	20
6	Abbotsford Mariners	16	5	8	3	26	32	−6	18
7	Cascade Surge	16	3	8	5	17	35	−18	14
8	Spokane Spiders	16	3	11	2	20	43	−23	11

==== Southwest Division ====
Pos	Team	Pld	W	L	T	GF	GA	GD	Pts
1	San Fernando Valley Quakes	16	8	2	6	32	25	+7	30
2	Fresno Fuego	16	9	5	2	38	27	+11	29
3	Ventura County Fusion	16	8	5	3	24	14	+10	27
4	San Francisco Seals	16	8	5	3	21	17	+4	27
5	San Jose Frogs	16	7	6	3	26	20	+6	24
6	Los Angeles Legends	16	6	6	4	32	25	+7	22
7	Bakersfield Brigade	16	4	5	7	16	21	−5	19
8	Orange County Blue Star	16	5	8	3	24	31	−7	18
9	Southern California Seahorses	16	3	8	5	15	27	−12	14
10	Lancaster Rattlers	16	2	10	4	18	39	−21	10

The top two teams in each division qualify for the playoffs.

== Playoffs ==
The Divisional Round for the Central Conference took place July 22–23, 2008, with the Conference Championships taking place between July 25–27. The PDL Semifinals took place on August 2, and the final was played on August 9.

=== Playoff bracket ===
Divisional Round	Conference Semifinals
C1	Michigan Bucks	1
MW2	(Michigan) Kalamazoo Outrage (AET)	3
MW1	(Illinois) Chicago Fire Premier	0
MW2	(Michigan) Kalamazoo Outrage	2
Central Conference
HL1	(Ontario) Thunder Bay Chill	3
HL2	Colorado Rapids U23's	1
HL1	(Ontario) Thunder Bay Chill	2
GL1	(Ohio) Cleveland Internationals	0
GL1	(Ohio) Cleveland Internationals	2
GL2	(Ontario) Toronto Lynx	1
NW1	(Washington (state)) Tacoma Tide	3
SW2	(California) Fresno Fuego	0
Western Conference
SW1	(California) San Fernando Valley Quakes	1
NW2	(British Columbia) Vancouver Whitecaps Residency (AET)	3
MA	(Pennsylvania) Reading Rage (AET)	4
WC	(New Jersey) Newark Ironbound Express	2
Eastern Conference
NE	(New York (state)) Brooklyn Knights (AET/PSO)	0 (5)
NWE	(Massachusetts) Cape Cod Crusaders	0 (3)
MS1	(Texas) Austin Aztex U23	2
SE2	(Florida) Bradenton Academics	1
Southern Conference
SE1	Central Florida Kraze	1
MS2	(Texas) Laredo Heat	2

Conference Finals
MW2	(Michigan) Kalamazoo Outrage	0
HL1	(Ontario) Thunder Bay Chill	4
NW1	(Washington (state)) Tacoma Tide	1
NW2	(British Columbia) Vancouver Whitecaps Residency	4
MA	(Pennsylvania) Reading Rage	1
NE	(New York (state)) Brooklyn Knights	0
MS1	(Texas) Austin Aztex U23	1
MS2	(Texas) Laredo Heat	3

National Semifinals
HL1	(Ontario) Thunder Bay Chill	2
NW2	(British Columbia) Vancouver Whitecaps Residency	1
MA	(Pennsylvania) Reading Rage	0
MS2	(Texas) Laredo Heat	2

PDL Championship Game
HL1	(Ontario) Thunder Bay Chill (AET/PSO)	1 (4)
MS2	(Texas) Laredo Heat	1 (1)

=== Divisional round ===
July 22, 2008
5:00 ET

(Illinois) Chicago Fire Premier	0 – 2	(Michigan) Kalamazoo Outrage
Cutshaw (yellow card) 52'	(Report)	Warmer (yellow card) 19'; 42' (OG); Alvino (yellow card) 62'; Muckey 63'

Toyota Park
Bridgeview, Illinois
Attendance: 75
Referee: Pawel Wydra (USA)

July 22, 2008
7:30 ET

(Ontario) Thunder Bay Chill	3 – 1	Colorado Rapids U23's
Oliveira 9' 56'; Coronado (yellow card) 33'; Gold (yellow card) 60'; Swartzendruber 74'; Paterson (yellow card) 86'; Putrus (yellow card) 90'; Zendejas (red card) 90'	(Report)	Warner (yellow card) 7' (yellow-red card) 78'; Schmoker (yellow card) 28'; Charles (yellow card) 49' (goal) 84'; Howlan (yellow card) 76'; Hemmi (red card) 90'

Chapples Park Stadium
Thunder Bay, Ontario
Attendance: 1,005
Referee: Mike Delecruz (CAN)

July 23, 2008
7:00 ET

(Ohio) Cleveland Internationals	2 – 1	(Ontario) Toronto Lynx
Williams (yellow card) 20'; Nanchoff (yellow card) 26'; Nagbe 54'; Zemanski 83'	(Report)	DeAbreu (yellow card) 42'; Scott 44' (yellow card) 54'; Binstock (yellow card) 82'

Coughlin Field
Lakewood, Ohio
Attendance: 45
Referee: Chris Ponso (USA)

=== Conference semifinals ===
July 25, 2008
5:00 ET

(Texas) Austin Aztex U23	2 – 1	(Florida) Bradenton Academics
Papandrea (yellow card) 39' (yellow-red card) 66'; Godbolt 56' (yellow card) 59'; Bernard (yellow card) 64'; Vincens 65'	(Report)	Ingvarsson (yellow card) 17'; Gavin (yellow card) 25'; Bello 74'; Maxwell (yellow card) 83'

Seminole Soccer Complex
Sanford, Florida
Attendance: 1,500
Referee: Robert Mauws (USA)

July 25, 2008
5:30 ET

(New York (state)) Brooklyn Knights	0 – 0 (AET)	(Massachusetts) Cape Cod Crusaders
Damiani (yellow card) 27'; Gonzales (yellow card) 82'; Ortega (yellow card) 93'; Dos Santos (yellow card) 108'	(Report)	Maloney (yellow card) 33'; Munro (yellow card) 73'
Penalties
Matteo (penalty scored); Damiani (penalty scored); Guerra (penalty scored); Dos Santos (penalty scored); Kulkov (penalty scored)	5 – 3	(penalty scored) Munro; (penalty missed) Maloney; (penalty scored) Lynn; (penalty scored) Vercollone

Don Thomas Stadium
Reading, Pennsylvania
Attendance: 280
Referee: Tim Snyder (USA)

July 25, 2008
7:30 ET

Central Florida Kraze	1 – 2	(Texas) Laredo Heat
Araujo (yellow card) 45'; Wolfe 54'; Mattson (red card) 90'	(Report)	Cruz (yellow card) 21'; Garcia 52' (yellow card) 90+'; Mulamba (yellow card) 53' (goal) 63'; Infante (yellow card) 87'

Seminole Soccer Complex
Sanford, Florida
Attendance: 1,500
Referee: Agostino Minasola (USA)

July 25, 2008
8:00 ET

(Pennsylvania) Reading Rage	4 – 2 (AET)	(New Jersey) Newark Ironbound Express
Ports 22'; O'Connor (yellow card) 66'; Burgess (yellow card) 67' (goal) 109' (PK); Taranto 74'; Benson 92'	(Report)	Kotynski (yellow card) 4'; Robinson (yellow card) 29'; Karcz 30' 62'; Grato (red card) 82'; Bilbao (yellow card) 83'; Chencinski (yellow card) 100'; Stamatis (yellow card) 100'; Ruesgen (yellow card) 102'

Don Thomas Stadium
Reading, Pennsylvania
Attendance: 657
Referee: Bo Maroo (USA)

July 26, 2008
5:30 ET

(Ontario) Thunder Bay Chill	2 – 0	(Ohio) Cleveland Internationals
Putrus (yellow card) 17'; Coronado (yellow card) 21' (red card) 45'; Alvarado (red card) 27'; Swartzendruber 66'; Intermoia 82'	(Report)

Ultimate Soccer Arena
Pontiac, Michigan
Referee: Clifton Ellis (USA)

July 26, 2008
7:30 ET

(California) San Fernando Valley Quakes	1 – 3 (AET)	(British Columbia) Vancouver Whitecaps Residency
Borak (yellow card) 72'; Agwu 82' (red card) 84'; Tracy (yellow card) 104'	(Report)	Leslie (yellow card) 65'; Davies (yellow card) 69'; Dosanjh (yellow card) 86'; Edwini-Bonsu 90+6' 110'; Russell (yellow card) 114' (goal) 116'; Sandhu (yellow card) 118'

Chukchansi Park
Fresno, California
Attendance: 1,291
Referee: Mike Kampmeinert (USA)

July 26, 2008
7:30 ET

Michigan Bucks	1 – 3 (AET)	(Michigan) Kalamazoo Outrage
DeMartin 31'; Morisset (yellow card) 39'; Clark (red card) 120'	(Report)	Alvino (yellow card) 34'; Oatley 86' (yellow card) 111' (goal) 120'; Muckey 98'

Ultimate Soccer Arena
Pontiac, Michigan
Referee: Marc Lawrence (USA)

July 26, 2008
10:30 ET

(California) Fresno Fuego	0 – 3	(Washington (state)) Tacoma Tide
Alvarado (yellow card) 32'; Calvo (yellow card) 89'; Nunes (yellow card) 89'	(Report)	Scott 18'; Mueller (yellow card) 30'; Schomaker 76'; Tangney 90'

Chukchansi Park
Fresno, California
Attendance: 3,214
Referee: Maurizio Laudini (USA)

=== Conference finals ===
July 26, 2008
7:00 ET

(Texas) Austin Aztex U23	1 – 3	(Texas) Laredo Heat
Alvarez (yellow card) 4'; Vega (red card) 5'; Watson 26' (PK) (yellow card) 64'; Godbolt (yellow card) 36' (yellow-red card) 41'	(Report)	Galvan (yellow card) 4'; Mulamba (yellow card) 12' (goal) 68'; Quinones (yellow card) 17'; Cruz (yellow card) 26'; Garcia 47' 51'; Morales (yellow card) 80'

Seminole Soccer Complex
Sanford, Florida
Attendance: 100
Referee: Martin Bell (USA)

July 27, 2008
4:30 ET

(Pennsylvania) Reading Rage	1 – 0	(New York (state)) Brooklyn Knights
Burgess 40' (yellow card) 45'; Rowling (yellow card) 69'	(Report)	Matteo (yellow card) 40'; Smith (yellow card) 43'; Gonzalez (yellow card) 53'; Damiani (yellow card) 61'; Carrizo (yellow card) 77'; Alvarado (red card) 90'

Don Thomas Stadium
Reading, Pennsylvania
Attendance: 510
Referee: Ian Bongaardt (USA)

July 27, 2008
7:00 ET

(Ontario) Thunder Bay Chill	4 – 0	(Michigan) Kalamazoo Outrage
Milroth 11'; Intermoia (yellow card) 20'; Oliveira 45' (PK); Swartzendruber 59'; C. Gold (yellow card) 75' (goal) 81'	Report	Howard (yellow card) 10'

Ultimate Soccer Arena
Pontiac, Michigan
Referee: Jason White (USA)

July 27, 2008
10:00 ET

(Washington (state)) Tacoma Tide	1 – 4	(British Columbia) Vancouver Whitecaps Residency
Mueller (yellow card) 46'; Knapp (yellow card) 54'; Agu (yellow card) 82'; Schomaker 90'	(Report)	Edwini-Bonsu 41' 64'; Semenets 66'; Russell 86'; Johnstone (yellow card) 87'

Chukchansi Park
Fresno, California
Attendance: 320
Referee: Colin Arblaster (USA)

=== PDL semifinals ===
August 2, 2008
7:00 ET

(Ontario) Thunder Bay Chill	2 – 1	(British Columbia) Vancouver Whitecaps Residency
Alvarado (yellow card) 52'; Milroth 61' (yellow card) 79'; Zendejas 90+4'		Leslie (yellow card) 41'; Dosanjh (yellow card) 56'; Davies (yellow card) 81'; Edwini-Bonsu 89' (yellow card) 90+4' (red card) 90+4'

Chapples Park Stadium
Thunder Bay, Ontario
Attendance: 1,546
Referee: Frank Carpino (CAN)

August 2, 2008
9:15 ET

(Texas) Laredo Heat	2 – 0	(Pennsylvania) Reading Rage
Quinones (yellow card) 29'; Ramos 41'; Garcia 78'; Humphrey (yellow card) 87'		O'Connor (yellow card) 50'; Sanders (yellow card) 84'

Texas A&M International University Soccer Complex
Laredo, Texas
Attendance: 1,693
Referee: Carlos Salas (USA)

=== PDL final ===
August 9, 2008
8:45 ET

(Texas) Laredo Heat	1 – 1 (AET)	(Ontario) Thunder Bay Chill
Blackwell (yellow card) 33'; Ibarra 46'; Infante (yellow card) 83'; Galvan (yellow card) 90'	(Report)	Putrus (yellow card) 34'; Da Silva (yellow card) 44'; Milroth (yellow card) 56' (yellow-red card) 76'; Oliveira 63' (yellow card) 76'; J. Gold (yellow card) 64'
Penalties
Galvan (penalty scored); Ordaz (penalty missed); Su (penalty missed)	1 – 4	(penalty scored) Oliveira; (penalty scored) Swartzendruber; (penalty scored) C. Gold; (penalty scored) Intermoia

Texas A&M International University Soccer Complex
Laredo, Texas
Attendance: 3,451
Referee: Jasen Anno (USA)

Championship MVP: (Brazil) Gustavo Oliveira (TBC)

== Awards, All–Conference Teams and All-League team ==
=== Awards ===
Scoring Champion: (Mexico) Junior Garcia (Yakima Reds) (15 Goals, 10 Assists)
Golden Boot: (Mexico) Junior Garcia (Yakima Reds) (15 Goals)
Assists Champion: (Brazil) Fabricio Codeceira (Fresno Fuego) (13 Assists)
GAA Champion: (Mexico) Miguel Gallardo (Austin Aztex U23)
MVP: (Mexico) Junior Garcia (Yakima Reds)
U19 Player of the Year: (United States) Felix Garcia (Laredo Heat)
Defender of the Year: (Argentina) Norberto Papandrea (Austin Aztex U23)
Goalkeeper of the Year: (Mexico) Miguel Gallardo (Austin Aztex U23)
Coach of the Year: (Germany) Wolfgang Suhnholz (Austin Aztex U23)

=== Weekly awards ===
Player of the Week
Week	Player	Club	Position	Reason	Ref.
3	(United States) Kellan Wilson	San Francisco Seals	Forward	2 goals off bench in 3-2 win at Fresno Fuego	
4	(United States) Adrian Schippers	New Hampshire Phantoms	Forward	2 goals in 2-1 win at Cape Cod Crusaders, gave Cape Cod their first home loss in 27 Games	
5	(United States) Steve Miller	Ocean City Barons	Forward	5 goals, 1 assist in 1-0-1 weekend	
6	(South Africa) Nate Jafta	Michigan Bucks	Midfielder	1 Goal, 6 Assist Week for Bucks; Qualified for US Open Cup	
7	(United States) Dan Stevens	Vermont Voltage	Midfielder	3 Assists and Gamewinning Goal in 19 minute span; 5-4 win over Rhode Island Stingrays	
8	(United States) Dan Williams	Des Moines Menace	Goalkeeper	23 Saves, 1 Shutout in 1-0-1 week against Thunder Bay Chill	
9	(Haiti) Jerrod Laventure	Newark Ironbound Express	Forward	Hat-trick in 4-0 win over unbeatean Ocean City Barons	
10	(United States) Jeremy Gold	Thunder Bay Chill	Forward	4 Goals in 2 wins over previously undefeated St. Louis Lions	
11	(United States) Robert McCurdy	Yakima Reds	Goalkeeper	2 Shutouts, 10 Saves week on the road: 2-0 over Abbotsford Mariners, 1-0 over Vancouver Whitecaps Residency	
12	(United States) Jamie Watson	Austin Aztex U23	Forward	2 Goals, 1 Assist Week (3-1 over Laredo Heat) (Game Winning Goal in 1-0 win over Mississippi Brilla).	
13	(United States) Kris Minton	Orange County Blue Star	Goalkeeper	Allowed only 1 goal in 270 minutes in 3 weekend wins	
14	(United States) Spencer Schomaker	Tacoma Tide	Forward	3 Goals, 2 Assists in 6-2 win over Yakima Reds to clinch playoff berth/division	

Team of the Week
Week	Goalkeeper	Defenders	Midfielders	Forwards	Honorable Mentions	Ref.
3	(Mexico) Gallardo (AUS)	(United States) Winblad (LAL) (United States) Howell (LAN) (Australia) Skelding (LIR) (United States) Delaney (NHP)	(United States) M. Davis (SFV) (United States) Domínguez (HOU) (United States) Galland (BAK)	(United States) Wilson (SFS) (United States) Araujo (CFK) (United States) Sagare (YAK)	NA	
4	(United States) Antonio (BRO)	(United States) Lawrence (MIS) (Argentina) Papandrea (AUS) (England) Fletcher (OCB)	(England) Angus (SLL) (United States) Wiedeman (SJF) (United States) Soto (CAD) (United States) Leopoldo (VCF)	(Brazil) Nunes (FRE) (United States) Grella (CAD) (United States) Schippers (NHP)	(United States) Cooper, GK, (LAR); (United States) Ritter, F, (RIS); (United States) Araujo, F, (CFK);	
5	(United States) Gorrick (CFK)	(United States) Alvino (KAL) (Russia) Kulkov (BRO) (United States) Cunningham (ELP)	(United States) Mena (WME) (United States) Johnson (FRD) (Jamaica) Maxwell (BRD) (United States) Warman (KCB)	(Mexico) J. García (YAK) (United States) Clark (OC) (United States) Miller (OCB)	(Scotland) Paterson, M, (DMM); (United States) F. Garcia, F, (LAR); (United States) DeMartin, F, (MIC);	
6	(Mexico) Gallardo (AUS)	(United States) Banks (OCB) (England) Younger (CHI) (Uganda) Kalungi (FRD)	(United States) Etherington (LAL) (South Africa) Jafta (MIC) (England) Klukowski (CCC) (Italy) Damiani (BRO)	(United States) Williams (KCB) (United States) Boggs (BRD) (Mexico) J. García (YAK)	(United States) J. Davis, M, (DMM); (United States) Boughton, M, (FWF); (United States) Heinemann, F (SLL);	
7	(United States) Mitrovich (ATL)	(United States) Armstrong (MIS) (United States) VanMatre (VER) (United States) Loizou (VIR)	(United States) Lopez (VCF) (Canada) Gonsalves (RIS) (United States) Stevens (VER) (United States) Niziolek (NIE)	(United States) Wilson (SFS) (United States) Uzoigwe (MIC) (Democratic Republic of the Congo) Zakuani (CLE)	(Peru) Becerra, M, (LIR); (United States) Mattson, F, (CFK); (Brazil) Barros, M, (BRC)	
8	(United States) D. Williams (DMM)	(England) Fletcher (OCB) (United States) Williams (CAR) (United States) Tracy (SFV) (Scotland) Munro (CCC)	(United States) Tangney (TAC) (United States) Belcher (VIR) (Brazil) Almeida (BRC)	(Brazil) Campos (FRE) (United States) F. Garcia (LAR) (Republic of the Congo) Bouemboue (CAR)	(United States) Alexander, M, (KAL); (Canada) Kekec, F, (ABB); (United States) Cuero, M, (AUS)	
9	(Canada) Baldock (ABB)	(United States) Harrison (WVC) (United States) Pate (SFV) (Brazil) Nogueira (ATL)	(England) Massie (CCC) (United States) Nanchoff (CLE) (Brazil) Oliveira (TBC) (Sierra Leone) Kamara (IND)	(United States) Stelmak (CIN) (United States) Greigo (ELP) (Haiti) Laventure (NIE)	(United States) Forrest, GK, (SLL); (United States) Ramirez, M, (FRE); (England) Lacey, M, (FRD);	
10	(United States) Bilinski (FWF)	(United States) Blades (CHI) (United States) Benson (REA) (United States) Tracy (SFV)	(United States) Peterlin (VCF) (United States) Louvier (CAS) (United States) Olivares (ELP) (England) Bailey (WES)	(Canada) Edwini-Bonsu (VWR) (United States) Gold (TBC) (United States) Buffington (MIS)	(Canada) Binstock, GK, (TOR); (United States) Konicoff, M, (WES); (Germany) Gatzky, M, (RIC);	
11	(United States) McCurdy (YAK)	(England) Quinn (REA) (Democratic Republic of the Congo) Bushiri (OTT) (United States) West (WVC)	(Argentina) Rodríguez (KCB) (United States) Konicoff (WES) (South Africa) Shipalane (MIC) (United States) Da Luz (AUS)	(United States) Oatley (KAL) (United States) Karcz (NIR) (United States) Ritter (RIS)	(United States) Paul, F, (LAL); (United States) Swartzendruber, F, (TBC); (United States) Harris, F, (PCP);	
12	(United States) Patovic (BRO)	(United States) Khale (RIS) (Trinidad and Tobago) Demmin (MIS) (United States) Motagalvan (VCF)	(Czech Republic) Boltnar (DMM) (Brazil) França (CHI) (Germany) Gatzky (RIC) (Brazil) Barros (BRC)	(United States) Dasah (OTT) (United States) Swartzendruber (TBC) (United States) Watson (AUS)	(United States) Conner, GK, (SFS); (England) Briggs, M, (KAL); (England) Woollard, F, (HRP);	
13	(United States) Minton (OC)	(Mexico) Samano (ELP) (United States) Alvino (KAL) (Scotland) Ruesgen (NIE) (Venezuela) Gonzalez (BRO)	(England) Hayers (NO) (United States) Rowling (NIE) (Brazil) Barros (BRC)	(United States) Schomaker (TAC) (United States) DeMartin (MIC) (Argentina) Lovell (SFS)	(United States) Swartzendruber, F, (TBC); (United States) Bush, GK, (CCC); (Romania) Neagu, F, FRD)	
14	(United States) Clark (MIC)	(Scotland) Munro (CCC) (United States) Powell (OGD) (Poland) Groch (BRO)	(Brazil) Codeceira (FRE) (United States) Harkins (MIS) (Mexico) Morales (LAR) (Republic of Ireland) Hogan (REA)	(United States) Karcz (NIR) (United States) Leopoldo (SFV) (United States) Schomaker (TAC)	(United States) Christensen, F, (OGD); (United States) Boggs, F, (BRD); (United States) A. Williams, M, (KCB)	

=== All- Conference Teams ===
==== Central Conference ====
F: (United States) Tommy Heinemann (SLL), (United States) Brandon Swartzendruber (TBC), (United States) Kenny Uzoigwe (MIC),
M: (South Africa) Nate Jafta (MIC)*, (United States) Michael Nanchoff (CLE), (United States) Joseph Salem (DMM)
D: (United States) Terry Alvino (KAL), (United States) Mike Holody (MIC)*, (United States) David Mueller (SLL), (England) Robert Younger (CFP)
G: (United States) Steve Clark (MIC)
Honorable Mention: (Canada) Daniel Revivo, F, TOR; (United States) Jimmy Cummings, MF, CIN; (United States) Sterling Flunder, D, WVC; (United States) Nicholas Cardenas, D, COL; (Zimbabwe) Mamba Chisoni, M, IND; (Kenya) Bonivenger Misiko, D, FWF; (United States) Ryan Emerson, D, WME

==== Eastern Conference ====
F: (Haiti) Jerrod Laventure (NIE), (United States) Jim Taranto (REA), (England) Michael Todd (LIR),
M: (Canada) Will Beauge (OTT)*, (United States) Adam Gazda (REA)*, (United States) Michael Konicoff (WES), (United States) Jeff Matteo (BRO)
D: (Uganda) Henry Kalungi (FRD), (Scotland) Graham Munro (CCC), (Scotland) Joseph Ruesgen (NIE),
G: (Canada) Tomer Chencinski (NIE)
Honorable Mention: (United States) Andrew Techanchuk, G, HRP; (United States) Nathan Belcher, F, VIR; (United States) Alex Horwath, G, NVR; (United States) Andrew Dykstra, G, RKF; (United States) Matt Stedman, F, VER; (United States) Tim Murray, G, NHP; (United States) Tim Ridder, F, RIS; (United States) Adam Sternberger, M, OCB; (United States) Pat Brown, M, NJR;

==== Southern Conference ====
F: (Argentina) Carlos Araujo (CFK)*, (United States) Zak Boggs (BRA), (United States) Felix Garcia (LAR)*
M: (Brazil) Leonardo Barros (BRC), (Mexico) Juan Ibarra (LAR), (United States) Ryan Roushandel (ATL)
D: (United States) Darrius Barnes (CAR)*, (United States) Travis Bender (CFK), (Trinidad and Tobago) Dwyane Demmin (MIS), (Argentina) Norberto Papandrea (AUS)*
G: (Mexico) Miguel Gallardo (AUS)*
Honorable Mention: (Colombia) Sebastian Narvaez, G, ELP; (Brazil) Bruno Guarda, M, DFW; (United States) Brandon Chagnard, M, NOS; (United States) Fernando Benitez, D, HOU; (England) Matt Watts, M, PCP; (United States) Sheanon Williams, D, CAR; (United States) Ryan McDonald, D, NAS; (United States) Collin Nicholas, M, PBP;

==== Western Conference ====
F: (Brazil) Pablo Campos (FRE), (Canada) Randy Edwini-Bonsu (VAN), (Mexico) Junior Garcia (YAK)*
M: (El Salvador) Junior Burgos (SFS), (United States) Taylor Canel (SFV), (Brazil) Fabricio Codeceira (FRE)*, (Canada) Gagan Dosanjh (VAN)
D: (United States) Doug Carr (SFS), (Mexico) Juan Viveros (YAK), (United States) Mark Lee (TAC),
G: (United States) Frank Logan (SPK)
Honorable Mention: (United States) Richie Bindrup, D, BYU; (United States) Michael Chesler, G, OGD; (Canada) James Giebelhaus, D, ABB; (England) Arron Patrick, M, CAS; (United States) Nick Barclay, D, SPK; (United States) Kyle Kaveny, D, SJF; (United States) Davis Paul, M, LAL; (United States) Eric Franco, D, BAK; (United States) Kyle Schmid, D, OCBS; (Romania) Cristian Rus, F, SCS; (United States) Mauricio Harrie, M, LAN; * denotes All-League selection

==== All-League team ====
F: (Argentina) Carlos Araujo (Central Florida Kraze); (United States) Felix Garcia (Laredo Heat) (U19 Player of the Year); (Mexico) Junior Garcia (Yakima Reds) (league MVP)
M: (Canada) Will Beaugé (Ottawa Fury); (Brazil) Fabricio Codeceira (Fresno Fuego); (United States) Adam Gazda (Reading Rage); (South Africa) Nate Jafta (Michigan Bucks)
D: (United States) Darrius Barnes (Cary RailHawks U23's); (United States) Mike Holody (Michigan Bucks); (Argentina) Norberto Papandrea (Austin Aztex U23) (Defender of the Year)
G: (Mexico) Miguel Gallardo (Austin Aztex U23) (Goalkeeper of the Year)
Coach: (Germany) Wolfgang Suhnholz (Austin Aztex U23)

== See also ==
- United Soccer Leagues 2008
