= Ogden Outlaws =

- Full name: Ogden Outlaws
- Nickname: The Outlaws
- Founded: 2006
- Dissolved: 2013
- Ground: Bonneville High School; Washington Terrace, Utah
- Capacity: Unknown
- Owner: (United States) Mike Hickman
- Head Coach: (United States) Rob Karas
- League: USL Premier Development League
- 2011: 7th, Southwest; Playoffs: DNQ
- Website: http://www.ogdenoutlaws.com
Home colors	Away colors

Ogden Outlaws was an American soccer team based in Ogden, Utah, United States. Founded in 2006, the team played in the USL Premier Development League (PDL), the fourth tier of the American Soccer Pyramid, in the Southwest Division of the Western Conference.

The team played its home games in the stadium at Bonneville High School in nearby Washington Terrace, Utah, where they had played since 2009. The team's colors were black and white.

== History ==
Ogden Outlaws entered the PDL in 2006, under the leadership of long-time Utah youth soccer coach Mike Hickman. To the surprise of many, Ogden made for a formidable on-field opponent almost immediately; despite a 1-0 loss to BYU Cougars in their opening game, and a 4-1 loss to Abbotsford Rangers in the next, the Outlaws regrouped themselves and rattled off three wins on the trot. Their 3-0 victory over Tacoma F.C. led to an unexpected qualification for the US Open Cup at the first attempt, although their campaign did not last long, losing 6-5 on penalties in the first round to a determined Sonoma County Sol from the NPSL. Ogden's impressive early-season form petered out at the year progressed; a 4-0 win over Cascade Surge was their most comprehensive victory of the year, but that was to be their final hurrah - thereafter, the team suffered a disappointing series of results including 6 consecutive defeats, ending their playoff hopes fairly early. They eventually finished 13 points behind champions Abbotsford Rangers; Bruno Baca was the top scorer of a team that also included Turks and Caicos Islands international midfielder Duane Glinton.

2007 started difficultly for Ogden, picking up just four points from their first four games of the season, and missing out on a second US Open Cup qualification. The month of June was better, highlighted by a pair of victories (3-2 over Tacoma Tide (Goals scored by Bruno Baca, Matt Broadhead, and Shawn Blymiller) and 2-0 over Abbotsford Rangers), (Goals scored by Kellan Christensen and Shawn Blymiller) but it was the Outlaws' form away from home which proved to be their downfall. The 6-2 loss away to BYU Cougars was their worst result of the season, and despite a comprehensive 6-1 thrashing of Cascade Surge on the final day, the Outlaws finished the year a distant fourth, a full 20 points behind divisional champions BYU. Kyle Christensen was the Outlaws' top scorer with 6 goals, while Matt Broadhead and Kellan Christensen tallied 3 assists each.

2008 was much of the same for Ogden, as poor away form hampered them in their progress up the Northwest Division standings. A 3-0 opening day victory over Spokane Shadow was a promising start, but the next six games yielded just one more victory, again over Spokane, and included a demoralising 5-0 thrashing by Tacoma Tide. June was a tough month for the Outlaws, with a hard-fought 2-1 win over Yakima Reds their only high point; the season did conclude strongly, with three wins in their final five games, including a dominant 5-2 win over Abbotsford Rangers that proved to be their most comprehensive victory of the season. Ogden again finished in mid-table obscurity, 14 points out of the playoffs in 5th place. Kyle Christensen and Andy Cornia were the joint top scorers with 4 goals each, and Matt Broadhead topped the assists standings for the second year in a row, with four.

Ogden realigned to the Southwest Division in 2009 following the PDL expansion in the Pacific Northwest, but found the going tough in amongst the teams of Southern California. They tied their first game of the season 1-1 with the Southern California Seahorses, but lost their next three on the trot, including a 4-0 hammering at the hands of Orange County Blue Star. They finally won their first game in early June, 1-0 over state rivals BYU Cougars, but despite their partnership with MLS side Real Salt Lake and an experienced coach in the shape of Ted Eck, suffered a miserable month thereafter, losing 5-0 to the Los Angeles Legends, allowing the Lancaster Rattlers to score a late winner in a 4-3 defeat, and being hit for seven by eventual divisional champions Hollywood United Hitmen. Somewhat surprisingly, the Outlaws finished the season strongly, notching wins over Orange County Blue Star and Fresno Fuego, before pummelling bottom-of-the-table Bakersfield Brigade 6-0 on the final day of the season, with Joseph Hickman scoring a brace. Unfortunately, this was the lone high point of an otherwise dispiriting season for the men from Weber County, who finished ninth in the division. Sam Charles and Andy Cornia were the Outlaws' joint top scorers, with 4 goals each.

The team folded before the 2013 season.

== Players ==
=== Current roster ===
As of June 10, 2011.

Note: Flags indicate national team as defined under FIFA eligibility rules; some limited exceptions apply. Players may hold more than one non-FIFA nationality.

No.	Pos.	Nation	Player
0	GK	USA	Devin Zimmerman
1	GK	USA	Richard Nolasco
2	MF	CHI	Rene Garay
3	MF	USA	Evans Tackie-Yarboi
4	DF	USA	Spencer Ford
5	MF	ARG	Adrian Castano
6	MF	USA	Marco Angelo
7	DF	USA	Ethan Summers
8	FW	USA	Andy Cornia
9	MF	USA	Josh Patino
10	MF	USA	Joseph Hickman
11	FW	USA	Chance Bukoski

No.	Pos.	Nation	Player
12	FW	CGO	Elias Hatungimana
14	MF	USA	Renzo Sanchez
15	DF	USA	Korbin Tafoya
16	MF	USA	Jordan Hatanaka
17	DF	USA	Matt Kurtz
19	FW	USA	Sina Alipour
20	DF	USA	Robert Hull
21	FW	USA	Carlos Lara
22	DF	USA	Kainoa Kahui
23	FW	USA	Chris Longi
24	DF	USA	Sam Hickman
25	FW	USA	Colby Liston

=== Notable former players ===
This list of notable former players comprises players who went on to play professional soccer after playing for the team in the Premier Development League, or those who previously played professionally before joining the team.

- (United States) Kyle Christensen
- (United States) Michael Farfan
- (Turks and Caicos Islands) Duane Glinton
- (United States) Clayton Zelin

== Year-by-year ==
Year	Division	League	Regular season	Playoffs	Open Cup
2006	4	USL PDL	4th, Northwest	Did not qualify	1st Round
2007	4	USL PDL	4th, Northwest	Did not qualify	Did not qualify
2008	4	USL PDL	5th, Northwest	Did not qualify	Did not qualify
2009	4	USL PDL	9th, Southwest	Did not qualify	Did not qualify
2010	4	USL PDL	9th, Southwest	Did not qualify	Did not qualify
2011	4	USL PDL	7th, Southwest	Did not qualify	Did not qualify
2012	4	USL PDL	5th, Southwest	Did not qualify	Did not qualify

== Head coaches ==
- (United States) Mike Hickman (2006–2008)
- (United States) Ted Eck (2009)
- (United States) Rob Karas (2010–present)

== Stadia ==
- Stadium at Ogden High School; Ogden, Utah (2006–2008)
- Stadium at Bonneville High School; Washington Terrace, Utah (2009–present)

== Average attendance ==
Attendance stats are calculated by averaging each team's self-reported home attendances from the historical match archive at

- 2006: 478
- 2007: 412
- 2008: 590
- 2009: 208
- 2010: 545
