= Scigliano (surname) =

Scigliano (pronounced [ʃiʎˈʎaːno]) is an Italian surname, associated with the town of Scigliano. Notable people with this surname include:

- Frankie Scigliano (born 1992), Canadian lacrosse goaltender
- George A. Scigliano (1874–1906), Italian-American activist and politician
- Joe Scigliano (born 1977), Canadian soccer player
