= Bateman Park =

Soccer stadium

- Interactive map of Bateman Park
- Location: Abbotsford, British Columbia
- Coordinates: 49.073°N 122.266°W
- Capacity: 1,000

Tenants
- Fraser Valley Cascades, Fraser Valley Mariners

Bateman Park is a soccer stadium located in Abbotsford, British Columbia. It is the home venue for the University of the Fraser Valley soccer teams and the Fraser Valley Mariners.
