= Dan Birkey =

American soccer player and coach (born 1957)

Personal information
- Full name: Daniel Birkey
- Date of birth: December 10, 1957
- Place of birth: Columbia, South Carolina, U.S.

Managerial career
- Years: Team
- 1985–1987: Portland Community College men's team
- 1988-2020: Concordia University, Portland men's team
- 1996: Cascade Surge USISL

Daniel Birkey (born December 10, 1957) is an American retired soccer player and coach who has worked in the game at the club, collegiate and professional levels. He was the head men's soccer coach at Concordia University in Portland, Oregon, from 1988 to 2020. Upon Concordia's shift to NCAA Division II in 2015, Birkey was the 10th all-time winningest men's soccer coach in NAIA history (27 years in NAIA, with .671 winning percentage).

Birkey recorded over 400 career wins during his time at Concordia alone.

== Biography and playing career ==
Birkey spent much of his youth in northern California, and moved to Washington before entering high school. He was a state championship basketball player there and multi-sport athlete, but discovered and fell in love with soccer in 1974 when he saw an acquaintance juggling a soccer ball with his feet. He played club and high school soccer in Tacoma under German coach Yontz Miller. Birkey traveled through Central America in 1976 playing soccer and learning the game.

Birkey was later recruited to compete at Warner Pacific College. While captaining the WPC team, Birkey set several school goal and assist records, was sixth in the nation in collegiate scoring, and was named to several conference and region all star teams. In his senior year alone, Birkey tallied 18 goals and 9 assists. Birkey was a top goal scorer and All-Star player for the Horse Brass Soccer Club where he played under British manager Clive Charles in the Oregon First Division and later with the championship Iguanas SC in the Over 30's Division.

In 1979, Birkey departed WPC as a conference and West Coast All-Star and left for South America the following summer. While there, he taught physical education and coached soccer at Christiansen Academy in Rubio, Venezuela, and played as a striker for Zulia FC before moving to the prestigious Deportivo Táchira soccer club in San Cristóbal. As an American international, Birkey became popular on and off the pitch in Venezuela, earning him the nickname "El Torito Blanco" among local soccer fans for his relentless work ethic, tenacious style of play, and off-field engagement in common public life.

== Coaching career ==
After returning to Oregon from South America, Birkey became limited as a player due to several knee surgeries, and focused on his coaching career leading Columbia High School in Troutdale. Having been played under Clive Charles, he was invited to coach with him at the club level and worked numerous years as a staff coach at the Portland Timbers youth camps along with other Timbers players from the late 1970s and early 1980s. It was Birkey's professional relationship with Charles that set the model for much of his coaching philosophy. In 1985, he began coaching at the collegiate level at Portland Community College while working in sports medicine. After earning his master's degree in kinesiology from Portland State in 1986, he began coaching at Concordia University Portland, in 1988. Since that time, he has become most widely known for the prolific success of Concordia men's soccer. A significant milestone was made for his Concordia soccer program as CU athletics gained membership to the Great Northwest Athletic Conference (GNAC) and transitioned to NCAA Division II competition in the Fall of 2015.

In 1992, Birkey led the Concordia Cavaliers to a National Association of Intercollegiate Athletics (NAIA) District Championship and into the title game of the NCCAA national tournament that same year. "The Navy" soccer team became a Cascade Conference power with NAIA regional tournament appearances in thirteen of the past sixteen years, and a top-twenty national ranking in fourteen of those years. Their highest ranking is fifth nationally. He directed Concordia to regional championships and NAIA national tournament berths in 1999, 2005, 2007, 2008, and 2010. In 2000, Birkey was named to the Cascade Conference Coaches Hall of Fame after receiving numerous district, conference, and regional Coach of the Year awards. Birkey amassed over 400 wins and a .642 winning percentage at Concordia. He earned eighteen championships during that time, including 13 of his last 15 Cascade Collegiate Conference championships. In 2007, Birkey led the Cavs to their tenth-straight regional tournament appearance after capturing the conference regular season title. Under his guidance the CU men's soccer team was crowned CCC Champions in 1998, 1999, 2000, 2002, 2003, 2004, 2005, 2006, 2007, 2008, 2010, 2011, and 2012 qualifying the CU team for the NAIA national tournament seven times in program history. Birkey was instrumental in the $7.5 million on-campus soccer stadium which opened in 2011. He worked closely with CU administrators and NIKE soccer to name the soccer field "Tuominen Yard" in respect to former CU soccer All-American (1994) and NIKE soccer marketing agent Jarkko Tuominen, who had died unexpectedly in September 2005. NIKE soccer maintained a strong relationship with the program and provided sponsorship until the closure of the university in 2020.

Birkey served as interim athletic director at Concordia in the mid-1990s and continued as a professor in the Exercise & Sport Science Department. He was hired in 1996 as the head coach for the Cascade Surge, a professional team in the USISL. Birkey directs the highly successful Concordia Soccer Camps attracting hundreds of young soccer players each summer. He also served six years as the conference chairman for men's soccer and was the regional chair for men's soccer from 2001 to 2004 and 2006 to 2008. In 2011, Birkey was appointed to the NAIA Men's Soccer Executive Board and served on the 2013 and 2014 National Tournament Games Committee. In January 2014, he was appointed National President of the NAIA Men's Soccer Coaches Association but ended his leadership service to the NAIA as Concordia turned its focus to NCAA DII and the GNAC. Birkey was awarded a Meritorious Service Award from the NAIA national office in April 2015 and continues to be a resource to the NAIA as a member of their past presidents group. In 2020, prior to Concordia's closure, Birkey was inducted into the Concordia University Athletic Hall of Fame in recognition of his total of 401 CU career wins during his 32 years of service to the university (1988–2020).

Birkey continued to develop in his coaching education by numerous appointments and visitations in the professional ranks. He coached in Costa Rica, Trinidad, and Antigua, and held staff visitations in the English Premiership with Portsmouth Football Club in 2006, 2007, and 2008 (FA Cup winners) while managed by Harry Redknapp; as well as Everton Football Club in Liverpool with First Team manager David Moyes and with the Reserve Team under Alan Stubbs, David Weir, and Andy Holden in 2013.
