= Fraser Valley Mariners =

- Full name: Fraser Valley Mariners
- Nickname: The Mariners
- Founded: 2003
- Stadium: Bateman Park; Abbotsford, British Columbia
- Capacity: 1,000
- Owner: Brad Nicholl
- Head Coach: Ian Knight
- League: USL Premier Development League
- 2011: 5th, Northwest; Playoffs: DNQ
- Website: http://www.abbotsfordsoccer.com
Home colours	Away colours

Fraser Valley Mariners was a Canadian soccer team based in Abbotsford, British Columbia, Canada. Founded in 2003, the team played in the USL Premier Development League (PDL), the fourth tier of the American Soccer Pyramid, in the Northwest Division of the Western Conference.

The team played its home games at Bateman Park, where they have played since 2004. The team's colours are black, white, and red.

Until 2007 the team was known as the Abbotsford Rangers, but changed their name prior to the 2008 season to reflect the name of their parent organization.

== History ==
The Abbotsford area has long had a history of competitive developmental teams, including Abbotsford 86ers Select in 2000, Abbotsford 86ers in 1999 and Abbotsford Athletes in Action in 1998; Abbotsford Rangers joined the PDL as a 'provisional team' in 2003, playing at Rotary Stadium, but struggled on the field, losing their first eight games, and not picking up a win until mid-June when they topped Cascade Surge 3-2 off goals by Jason Jorgensen, Brad Peetoom and Spencer Schmidt. The victory sparked an unexpected 4-game winning streak which included a season's best 3-1 victory over Calgary Storm Select, but the resurgence was too little too late for the team, and the season ended with them in fourth place, and Jason Jorgensen as the top scorer.

2004 saw the Rangers move into a new home at Bateman Park, and hire a new player-manager in the shape of former Hamilton Academical and Canada defender Colin Miller, who had been in the Canadian squad for the 1986 FIFA World Cup. Despite Miller's presence, Abbotsford's results did not improve greatly; they did not pick up their first win until the fourth game (2-1 over Yakima Reds), and only managed three more victories all season. Things hit an all-time low on the final day of the season with their 5-0 demolition at the hands of Cascade Surge, and they again finished way off the pace, 19 points behind champions Cascade.

2005 saw Abbotsford slip even further behind their competition, finishing their season a full 29 points behind defending champions Cascade Surge in the Northwest division, with just 3 wins and 21 goals all year. Abbotsford suffered greatly on the road, losing 5-1 and 4-1 to Cascade, and didn't pick up a single point until their 2-1 victory away to Yakima Reds in mid-June. All of Abbotsford's wins were against Yakima, triumphing two more times, including a 1-0 final day victory on a goal by the consistent Jason Jorgensen. Nevertheless, Abbotsford's poor form was worrying for all involved.

Early Abbotsford Rangers logo

Then, quite inexplicably, everything changed in 2006. Miller's men were hot from the get-go, with an opening day tie with newcomers Tacoma F.C., and then back-to-back victories over Yakima Reds and the other Northwest newcomers, Ogden Outlaws. June saw the team embark on an unprecedented 6-game unbeaten streak, the highlight of which was a 4-0 road thumping of Cascade Surge. As the season wound down, Abbotsford was one of three teams vying for the playoffs, knowing that two victories in their final two games would take them into uncharted territory. A 4-0 triumph over Cascade - which included a hat trick from Sean Crocker - was followed by a comprehensive 3-0 win over Tacoma, and the Rangers had their first Northwest title and were off to the playoffs. However, their postseason was a short one, as they lost 3-2 to Orange County Blue Star first time out, despite being 2-0 up at halftime.

Colin Miller left Abbotsford in the 2006 close season to become Billy Davies' assistant at Derby County in the Premier League, and he was replaced by former Canadian international Shaun Lowther for the 2007 campaign. Initially, the managerial change seemed to affect Abbotsford's excellent form, the team picking up just one win and four ties in their first ten game. However, following their come-from-behind 3-2 win against Yakima Reds at the end of June, something clicked into place for Abbotsford: from that point on they began to utterly demolish their opponents, thrashing Cascade Surge 4-0, topping Yakima Reds 3-0, beating Tacoma Tide 4-1, and finishing the year with an absolutely astonishing 11-0 win over Spokane Spiders which included a double hat-trick SIX goals from striker James Severn. However, this late rally was not enough for them to make the playoffs, and they eventually finished a close third in the table behind BYU Cougars and Tacoma Tide.

Abbotsford began the 2008 season as the first-ever opponents of the new Vancouver Whitecaps Residency franchise; they lost the opening matchup 3-1, but won their next fixture against BYU Cougars, setting in motion the story of most of the rest of the season. 2008 was the year of 'boom or bust' for Abbotsford, where almost every game was either a resounding victory or a humiliating defeat: they beat Cascade Surge 5-0 in a game that featured a hat trick from Adrian Kekec, beat Spokane Spiders 4-0 at home, and put another four past Cascade at the beginning of July. At the other end of the scale, they were hammered 4-1 by Vancouver Whitecaps Residency in the second of their three matchups, were on the receiving end of a 5-1 thrashing from eventual divisional champs Tacoma Tide, and lost 4-1 to Yakima Reds in the middle of the five-game winless streak that concluded their season. While Abbotsford's games were never anything less than entertaining, their erratic form proved costly, as they finished the season in 6th place. Spencer Schmidt was the top scorer for the season, with 7 goals, while Justin Cordick scored five goals and contributed 4 assists.

2009 was a return to the disappointing form of previous years for the Mariners, despite starting the season optimism following the hiring of local soccer personality Alan Errington as head coach. After a loss and a draw, they opened 2 game series at home against the new Victoria Highlanders franchise, and drew their home opener 2-2. Following their 2-1 return win over Victoria and 4-0 thrashing of the Spokane Spiders (in which Cameron Wilson scored twice) in late May, were in contention at the early stage of the season. However, June was a disaster for Abbotsford, as the team suffered several tough losses, being outplayed 3-1 by the Kitsap Pumas, and being slaughtered 6-1 on the road at the Yakima Reds. The Mariners ultimately won just four games all season, their final two victories coming via an unexpectedly comprehensive 6-0 revenge victory over Yakima that featured a pair of braces from Gibson Bardsley and substitute Brendan Podolsky, and an astonishing topsy-turvy 5-3 win over Tacoma Tide which saw the team weather a strong fightback after being 4-1 ahead at one stage. The 5-0 final day loss to Portland Timbers U23's summed up the season, and left them in 8th place in the Northwest, 15 points behind divisional champs Kitsap. Cameron Wilson was the Mariners' top scorer, with 8 goals, while Spencer Schmidt contributed 4 assists.

== Players ==
=== Notable former players ===
This list of notable former players comprises players who went on to play professional soccer after playing for the team in the Premier Development League, or those who previously played professionally before joining the team.

- (Canada) Tyler Baldock
- (Canada) Adam Lang
- (Canada) Diaz Kambere
- (Canada) Adrian Kekec
- (Canada) Stefan Leslie
- (Canada) Nigel Marples
- (Canada) Colin Miller
- (Canada) Mark Village

== Year-by-year ==
Year	Division	League	Regular season	Playoffs	Open Canada Cup
2003	4	USL PDL	4th, Northwest	Did not qualify	Did not participate
2004	4	USL PDL	3rd, Northwest	Did not qualify	Did not participate
2005	4	USL PDL	4th, Northwest	Did not qualify	Did not participate
2006	4	USL PDL	1st, Northwest	Round of 16	Did not participate
2007	4	USL PDL	3rd, Northwest	Did not qualify	Did not participate
2008	4	USL PDL	6th, Northwest	Did not qualify	N/A
2009	4	USL PDL	8th, Northwest	Did not qualify	N/A
2010	4	USL PDL	7th, Northwest	Did not qualify	N/A
2011	4	USL PDL	5th, Northwest	Did not qualify	N/A
2012	4	USL PDL	8th, Northwest	Did not qualify	N/A
2013	5	PCSL Reserves	1st	Runner Up	N/A

== Honours ==
- USL PDL Northwest Division Champions: 2006

== Head coaches ==
- (Canada) Colin Miller (2004–2006)
- (Canada) Shaun Lowther (2007–2008)
- (England) Alan Errington (2009)

== Stadia ==
- Rotary Stadium; Abbotsford, British Columbia (2003)
- Bateman Park; Abbotsford, British Columbia (2004–present)
- Townsend Park Stadium; Chilliwack, British Columbia (2009) 5 games

== Average attendance ==
Attendance stats are calculated by averaging each team's self-reported home attendances from the historical match archive at https://web.archive.org/web/20100105175057/http://www.uslsoccer.com/history/index_E.html.

- 2005: 218
- 2006: 196
- 2007: 180
- 2008: 160
- 2009: 133
- 2010: 144
- 2011: 116
- 2012: 76
