= Aviv Volnerman =

Israeli footballer

Aviv Volnerman אביב וולנרמן
Personal information
- Full name: Aviv Volnerman
- Date of birth: July 18, 1980 (age 46)
- Place of birth: Israel
- Height: 5 ft 7 in (1.70 m)
- Position: Forward

Team information
- Current team: Newark Ironbound Express
- Number: 30

Youth career
- Hapoel Tel Aviv

Senior career*
Years	Team	Apps	(Gls)
1998–2001	Hapoel Tel Aviv	16	(1)
2001	Maccabi Netanya	3	(0)
2001 2004	Hapoel Ramat Gan		
2005	Hapoel Herzliya		
2006–2007	Sektzia Nes Tziona		
2008	New York Salamina		
2009–	Newark Ironbound Express	4	(1)

International career^{‡}
2001	Israel U-21	1	(0)
- * Club domestic league appearances and goals as of 20 June 2009 ‡ National team caps and goals as of 11 May 2009

Aviv Volnerman (Hebrew: אביב וולנרמן; born July 18, 1980) is an Israeli soccer player currently playing for Newark Ironbound Express in the USL Premier Development League.

== Career ==
=== Club ===
Volnerman made his league debut in a match against Maccabi Jaffa. After not receiving much playing time at Maccabi Netanya, Volnerman left the club to join Liga Leumit side Hapoel Ramat Gan. In his second season at the club, Ramat Gan won the State Cup and a place in the UEFA Cup. Volnerman played in Ramat Gan's two UEFA Cup matches against PFC Levski Sofia.

After leaving Israel, Volnerman took up coaching and became the coach of the varsity and junior varsity football teams at Ma'ayanot Yeshiva High School in Teaneck, New Jersey.

=== International ===
Volnerman made one appearance for the Israel national under-21 football team in 2001 in a friendly against the Greece national under-21 football team at Bloomfield Stadium in Tel Aviv, Israel.

== Statistics ==
Club performance			League		Cup		League Cup		Continental		Total	
Season	Club	League	Apps	Goals	Apps	Goals	Apps	Goals	Apps	Goals	Apps	Goals
Israel			League		Israel State Cup		Toto Cup		Europe		Total	
1998–1999	Hapoel Tel Aviv	Liga Leumit	-	-	-	-	-	-	-	-	-	-
1999–2000	Hapoel Tel Aviv	Ligat ha'Al	2	0	0	0	0	0	0	0	2	0
2000–2001	Hapoel Tel Aviv	Ligat ha'Al	14	1	0	0	0	0	0	0	14	1
2001	Maccabi Netanya	Ligat ha'Al	3	0	0	0	1	0	0	0	4	0
2001–2002	Hapoel Ramat Gan	Liga Leumit	-	-	-	-	-	-	0	0	-	-
2002–2003	Hapoel Ramat Gan	Liga Leumit	-	-	-	-	-	-	0	0	-	-
2003–2004	Hapoel Ramat Gan	Liga Leumit	-	-	-	-	-	-	2	0	-	-
USA			League		Open Cup		League Cup		North America		Total	
2009	Newark Ironbound Express	PDL	4	1	0	0	0	0	0	0	4	1
Career total			-	-	-	-	-	-	-	-	-	-

== Honours ==
- With Hapoel Tel Aviv:
  - Israeli Premier League (1): 1999–00
  - State Cup (2): 1999, 2000
- With Hapoel Ramat Gan:
  - State Cup (1): 2003
