= Ian Knight (footballer) =

English footballer (born 1966)

Personal information
- Full name: Ian John Knight
- Date of birth: 26 October 1966 (age 60)
- Place of birth: Hartlepool, England
- Height: 6 ft 2 in (1.88 m)
- Position: Defender

Youth career
- Barnsley

Senior career*
Years	Team	Apps	(Gls)
1984–1985	Barnsley	0	(0)
1985–1990	Sheffield Wednesday	21	(0)
1989	→ Scunthorpe United (loan)	2	(0)
1990–1992	Grimsby Town	21	(2)
1992	Carlisle United	1	(0)
1992–1993	Boston United	10	(1)
1993	Grantham Town	?	(?)

International career
1986	England U21	2	(0)

Managerial career
- 2010–: Abbotsford Mariners
- * Club domestic league appearances and goals

Ian John Knight (born 26 October 1966) is a former professional footballer who played as a defender. He played for Sheffield Wednesday and Grimsby Town before retiring due to injuries.

== Playing career ==
Knight began his career promisingly. He established himself in the first-team at Sheffield Wednesday, and was capped twice for the England under-21s.

=== Injury ===
Knight was badly injured on 4 February 1987 in a FA Cup replay against Chester City. Two minutes into the game a poor tackle by Gary Bennett left Knight's leg broken in seven places. Although he recovered from the injury, Knight lost his place in the first-team and was sold to Grimsby Town. However, recurring injury problems limited him to only 21 appearances in two years and he left the club in 1992. He then had a brief spell at Carlisle United, appearing once in the league before dropping into non-league football, where he played for Boston United and Grantham Town before deciding to retire.

He later sought £1.5 million damages against Bennett for the incident. In 1997, Knight settled the case out of court with Chester City. It was the first time a professional footballer had successfully claimed compensation for a career-ending injury.

== Post-playing career ==
Shortly after retiring, Knight worked on a youth programme at Grimsby. When his contract with Grimsby ended, he moved to Canada where he coached youth teams at the Greater London Soccer Club. In April 2010, he was appointed head coach of the Abbotsford Mariners.

== Career statistics ==
Season	Club	League			FA Cup		League Cup		FL Trophy		Total	
Season	Club	Division	Apps	Goals	Apps	Goals	Apps	Goals	Apps	Goals	Apps	Goals
1984–85	Barnsley	Second Division	0	0	0	0	0	0	–		0	0
1985–86	Sheffield Wednesday	First Division	4	0	0	0	0	0	–		4	0
1986–87	Sheffield Wednesday	First Division	15	0	3	0	1	0	–		19	0
1987–88	Sheffield Wednesday	First Division	0	0	0	0	0	0	–		0	0
1988–89	Sheffield Wednesday	First Division	2	0	2	0	0	0	–		4	0
1989–90	Scunthorpe United (loan)	Fourth Division	2	0	0	0	0	0	0	0	2	0
1989–90	Grimsby Town	Fourth Division	9	1	0	0	0	0	0	0	9	1
1990–91	Grimsby Town	Third Division	8	1	0	0	1	0	1	0	10	1
1991–92	Grimsby Town	Second Division	4	0	0	0	0	0	–		4	0
1992–93	Carlisle United	Third Division	1	0	0	0	0	0	0	0	1	0
Total			45	2	5	0	2	0	1	0	53	2
