= Shaun Lowther =

Footballer (born 1962)

Personal information
- Date of birth: 24 January 1962 (age 64)
- Place of birth: North Shields, England
- Position: Defender

Youth career
- Wallsend Boys Club
- Manchester United

Senior career*
Years	Team	Apps	(Gls)
1980–1984	Vancouver Whitecaps	57	(0)
1980–1982	U.C.D.		
1984–1985	Blyth Spartans	0	(0)
1984–1985	Peterborough United	1	(0)
1987–1988	Vancouver 86ers	44	(0)
1989	Winnipeg Fury	25	(0)
1990	Hamilton Steelers	10	(0)

International career
1983–1985	Canada	14	(0)

Managerial career
- Hamilton Steelers
Medal record
Representing Canada
Men's Association football
CONCACAF Championship
Winner	1985 North America
- * Club domestic league appearances and goals

Shaun Lowther (born 24 January 1962) is a former professional soccer player who played as a defender spending five seasons in the North American Soccer League. Born in England, he made 14 appearances for the Canada national team. He is an executive of a youth soccer club in Airdrie, Alberta.

== Club career ==
Lowther moved to Canada at age 16. In 1980, he signed with the Vancouver Whitecaps of the North American Soccer League, playing five seasons with them.

In September 1980 Lowther, along with three Canadian teammates signed for University College Dublin A.F.C. on scholarships sponsored by Vancouver. They were released in February 1982.

In 1984, he moved to the Blyth Spartans then Peterborough United. In 1987, he signed with the Vancouver 86ers of the newly established Canadian Soccer League. The team was inducted into the BC Sports Hall of Fame for their unbeaten streak of over 50 games during the 1987 and 1988 seasons. In 1989, he moved to the Winnipeg Fury before ending his career with the Hamilton Steelers.

== International career ==
Lowther played fourteen times for the Canada national team between 1983 and 1985. He played in several FIFA World Cup qualifying games for the Canada team that qualified for the 1986 FIFA World Cup in Mexico.

== Coaching career ==
Following his retirement as a player, Lowther became the head coach of the Hamilton Steelers. He was the general manager of the Okanagan Predators of the PDL in 2001 and 2002. In 2008, he became the head coach of the Abbotsford Soccer Association and head coach of the PDL League's Abbotsford Mariners. He has just assumed the post of general manager of NSD Soccer Club in Calgary, Alberta.

== Honours ==
Canada

- CONCACAF Championship: 1985
