= Carlos Calderson =

Spanish footballer (born 1973)

Personal information
- Date of birth: 18 November 1973 (age 52)
- Place of birth: Cádiz, Spain
- Height: 5 ft 8 in (1.73 m)
- Position: Midfielder

Youth career
- Portuense

College career
Years	Team	Apps	(Gls)
1996–1998	Christian Heritage Hawks		

Senior career*
Years	Team	Apps	(Gls)
1990–1992	Portuense		
1992–1995	→ UD Roteña (loan)		
1998	Cascade Surge		
1999–2001	San Diego Flash	55	(6)
2002–2003	Charlotte Eagles	46	(1)
2003	San Diego Sockers (indoor)	8	(0)
2003	Monterrey Fury (indoor)	6	(0)
2003–2004	Cascade Surge	29	(2)
2008–2011	San Diego Sockers (indoor)	2	(0)

Managerial career
- 2007: Ohio Christian Trailblazers
- San Diego Mesa Olympians
- ?–2012: San Diego Christian Hawks
- 2016–: LA Galaxy OC U15-19 director
- * Club domestic league appearances and goals

Carlos Calderson (born 18 November 1973) is a Spanish retired association football player who played professionally in USL A-League and the Major Indoor Soccer League.

== Player ==
Calderson spent his youth playing in the Racing Club Portuense Academy. In 1990, he joined Portuense's first team, playing there for two seasons. Portuense then loaned him to UD Roteña. In 1995, Calderson moved to the United States to attend Christian Heritage College. While there, he played for the school's soccer team, gaining 1996 Honorable Mention, 1997 Second Team and 1998 First Team NCCAA All American recognition. In 1998, Calderson spent the collegiate off-season with the Cascade Surge. In 1999, Calderson signed with the San Diego Flash of the USL A-League. In 2002, the Flash ceased operations and Calderson joined the Charlotte Eagles. After two seasons, he moved to the Cascade Surge of the USL Premier Development League. In addition to his outdoor career, Calderson also played indoor soccer. In 2003, he spent time with the San Diego Sockers of the Major Indoor Soccer League. He then played for the Monterrey Fury during the 2003-2004 MISL season. Calderson played for the third version of the San Diego Sockers of the Professional Arena Soccer League from 2008 to 2010 season.

== Coach ==
In 2007, Calderson coached the Ohio Christian University to a 1-16-0 He then became the head coach at San Diego Christian College.
