= Arron Patrick =

English footballer

Personal information
- Date of birth: 14 March 1987 (age 39)
- Place of birth: Grimsby, England
- Position: Midfielder

Team information
- Current team: Grace Lancers (head coach)

Youth career
- Grimsby Town
- Spalding United

College career
Years	Team	Apps	(Gls)
2006–2009	Bethel Pilots		

Senior career*
Years	Team	Apps	(Gls)
2008–2009	Cascade Surge	29	(4)
2013	Wilmington Hammerheads	9	(0)

Managerial career
- 2012–2013: Bethel Pilots (assistant)
- 2014–2018: Goshen Maple Leafs
- 2019–: Grace Lancers
- * Club domestic league appearances and goals

Arron Patrick (born 14 March 1987) is an English retired professional footballer who is the head coach for the Grace College Lancer men's soccer team.

== Career ==
=== College and amateur ===
Patrick played four years of college soccer at Bethel College between 2006 and 2009.

=== Professional ===
Patrick played with USL PDL club Cascade Surge in 2008 and 2009, and later signed professionally with USL Pro club Wilmington Hammerheads on 12 April 2013.

=== Coaching ===
Patrick began coaching in 2012, joining his alma mater Bethel College as an assistant. Patrick was named head coach of the Goshen College men's team prior to 2014 season. In 2019, Patrick took over as head coach for the men's team at Grace College.
