= A. J. Godbolt =

American soccer player

Personal information
- Full name: Aaron John Godbolt
- Date of birth: March 7, 1984 (age 42)
- Place of birth: Boston, Massachusetts, United States
- Height: 5 ft 10 in (1.78 m)
- Position: Midfielder

College career
Years	Team	Apps	(Gls)
2002–2006	Maryland Terrapins		

Senior career*
Years	Team	Apps	(Gls)
2004–2005	Austin Lightning	8	(0)
2007	Kansas City Wizards	0	(0)
2008	Austin Aztex U23	9	(2)
2009	Austin Aztex	17	(0)
- * Club domestic league appearances and goals as of 6 November 2009

Aaron John "A. J." Godbolt (born March 7, 1984) is an American former soccer player.

== Career ==
=== College and amateur ===
Godbolt played college soccer at the University of Maryland from 2002 to 2006. Over five years he played in 60 matches, starting in 39 of them. He finished his career there with 2 goals and 19 assists. He played his club soccer for the Austin Capitals Soccer Club and the Longhorn Soccer Club, and also played two seasons for Austin Lightning in the USL Premier Development League.

=== Professional ===
Godbolt was drafted in the third round, 32nd overall, by the Kansas City Wizards in 2007 MLS Supplemental Draft but was waived after one season without making a senior start, and subsequently signed for the Austin Aztex U23. Godbolt played 9 games and scored 2 goals for the Aztex in 2008, before graduating up to the senior Austin Aztex team prior to its expansion into the USL First Division in 2009.

He made his professional debut on April 18, 2009, in Austin's USL1 season opener against Minnesota Thunder. He was released by the Aztex at the end of the 2009 season.

== Personal ==
Godbolt is the son of Michael "Bucky" Godbolt, a popular Austin sports radio personality on 104.9 The Horn and former University of Texas running backs coach.

While attending the University of Maryland, A.J. helped train many youth teams including the Silver Spring Sharks.
