= Jersey Express S.C. =

Jersey Express
- Full name: Jersey Express Soccer National Soccer Academy
- Nickname: Ironbound
- Founded: 2007 (as Newark Ironbound Express)
- Dissolved: 2018
- Stadium: Williams Field; Elizabeth, New Jersey
- Owner: Joe Branco
- General Manager: Gali Maimon
- Coach: Didier Orellana
- League: Premier Development League
- 2017: 4th, Mid Atlantic; Playoffs: DNQ
Home colors

Jersey Express was an American soccer team based in Springfield, New Jersey. Founded in 2007, the team played in the Premier Development League (PDL), the fourth tier of the American Soccer Pyramid, in the Mid Atlantic Division of the Eastern Conference. Prior to the 2011 season the team was known as Newark Ironbound Express. The team's colors were white, Emerald and Gold.

Since 2016, the Express played their home games at Williams Field in Elizabeth, NJ. The team formerly played their home games at Lubetkin Field at J. Malcolm Simon Stadium on the campus of the New Jersey Institute of Technology from 2008-2015. The stadium was demolished in 2015 for NJIT's Wellness and Events Center.

The team also fielded a team in the USL's Super-20 League, a league for players 17 to 20 years of age run under the United Soccer Leagues umbrella and teams from ages 10–18 boys and girls Under National Soccer Academy.

== History ==
Newark Ironbound Express entered the PDL in 2007. The senior Express team began life in the PDL with a bang with a 4–1 opening day victory over fellow expansion team New Jersey Rangers that featured a brace from former New York Red Bull and current Haitian international Jerrod Laventure. Ironbound were consistent all year long, enjoying several impressive victories over much more established sides, notably a 3–0 over Ottawa Fury in early June (in which Ted Niziolek scored a hat trick), a 4–0 win on the road against Ocean City Barons (which featured a Laventure hat-trick), a dominant 3–1 win over 2007's unbeatable Hampton Roads Piranhas, and a battling 4–2 triumph over Virginia Legacy. By the time the final weekend rolled around, they were still in with a shot at a place in the Eastern Conference playoffs: they enjoyed overpowering 6–2 demolition of Westchester Flames, in which Chris Karcz netted three times, and were fortunate to make the playoffs ahead of Ottawa Fury, who had an exactly equal record, but lost out on head-to-head results. Unfortunately, Ironbound's trip to the playoff was a short one as they fell 4–2 first time out to eventual Conference champions Reading Rage, but for a young side in their debut season there was much to applaud. Chris Karcz and Jerrod Laventure were monsters in front of goal, scoring 10 and 9 goals respectively.

In October 2009 the team Owner Mr. Joe Branco Hired Mr. Gali Maimon as new general manager of the organization.

The team formally rebranded as Jersey Express on January 6, 2011. On January 10, 2018, the team announced via Twitter that it would no longer operate as an adult soccer organization but would continue youth training.

== Notable former players ==
This list of notable former players comprises players who went on to play professional soccer after playing for the team in the Premier Development League, or those who previously played professionally before joining the team.

- (Poland) David Topolski
- (United States) Frank Alesci
- (United States) Gary Boughton
- (United States) Alex Luna
- (Canada) Tomer Chencinski
- (United States) Dilly Duka
- (United States) Neal Kitson
- (El Salvador) Derby Carrillo
- (United States) Ryan Meara
- (United States) Gordon Kljestan
- (Israel) Aviv Volnerman
- (United States) Tommy McNamara
- (United States) Jake Keegan
- (United States) David Abidor
- (United States) Matt Turner
- (Afghanistan) Mohammad Mashriqi

== Year-by-year ==
Year	Division	League	Regular season	Playoffs	Open Cup
Newark Ironbound Express
2008	4	USL PDL	2nd, Northeast	Conference Semifinals	Did not qualify
2009	4	USL PDL	5th, Northeast	Did not qualify	Did not qualify
2010	4	USL PDL	2nd, Mid Atlantic	Conference Semifinals	Did not qualify
Jersey Express S.C.
2011	4	USL PDL	3rd, Mid Atlantic	Conference Finals	Did not qualify
2012	4	USL PDL	3rd, Mid Atlantic	Conference Quarterfinals	Did not qualify
2013	4	USL PDL	4th, Mid Atlantic	Did not qualify	Did not qualify
2014	4	USL PDL	1st, Mid Atlantic	National Semifinals	2nd Round
2015	4	USL PDL	3rd, Mid Atlantic	Conference Finals	3rd Round
2016	4	USL PDL	5th, Mid Atlantic	Did not qualify	3rd Round
2017	4	USL PDL	4th, Mid Atlantic	Did not qualify	Did not qualify

== Honors ==
- USL PDL Eastern Conference Champions 2014
- USL PDL Mid-Atlantic Division Champions 2014

== Head coaches ==
- (Russia) George Vichniakov (2008–2012)
- (United States) Jeff Matteo (2013-2015)
- (Brazil) Anderson DaSilva (2015)
- (Brazil) Chiquinho de Assis (2015)
- (England) Julian Richens (2016–2017)
- Didier Orellana (2017–2018)

== Stadia ==
- Lubetkin Field at J. Malcolm Simon Stadium at New Jersey Institute of Technology; Newark, New Jersey (2008–2015)
  - Stadium at Holmdel High School; Holmdel Township, New Jersey 1 game (2010)
  - Stadium at Raritan High School; Hazlet, New Jersey 2 games (2011)
- Williams Field at Elizabeth High School; Elizabeth, NJ (2016–present)
  - Stadium at Long Branch High School; Long Branch, New Jersey 2 games (2016)

== Average attendance ==
Attendance stats are calculated by averaging each team's self-reported home attendances from the historical match archive. Attendance stats also provided by team.

- 2008: 328
- 2009: 219
- 2010: 378
- 2011: 389
- 2012: 411
- 2013: 422
- 2014: 452
- 2015: 502
- 2016: 312
