= Jerrod Laventure =

American-born Haitian footballer (born 1983)

Personal information
- Full name: Jerrod Laventure
- Date of birth: January 15, 1983 (age 43)
- Place of birth: Middle Island, New York, United States
- Height: 6 ft 1 in (1.85 m)
- Position: Forward

Team information
- Current team: Jersey Express
- Number: 11

Youth career
- 2001–2004: Seton Hall Pirates

Senior career*
| Years | Team | Apps | (Gls) |
| 2006–2007 | New York Red Bulls | 6 | (1) |
| 2008– | Jersey Express | 56 | (32) |

International career^{‡}
| 2008 | Haiti | 3 | (0) |
- * Club domestic league appearances and goals as of July 1, 2012 ‡ National team caps and goals as of July 1, 2002

Jerrod Laventure (born January 15, 1983) is an American-born Haitian footballer.

== Career ==
=== College ===
Laventure played college soccer at Seton Hall University, where in four seasons he scored 14 goals and assisted on 12. He was named to the Big East first team after recording eight goals and six assists in 2004. After his senior season he was invited to the 2005 MLS Player Combine which led to him joining the MetroStars reserve team.

=== Professional ===
Laventure signed a developmental contract with the New York Red Bulls on April 12, 2006. He made his MLS debut July 8, 2006 as a substitute in a game against FC Dallas, and scored his first professional goal on July 19, 2006 - a spectacular 30-yard chip over Columbus Crew goalkeeper Noah Palmer which won him the Goal of the Week Award. Laventure started his first game for the Red Bulls against the Wilmington Hammerheads of the USL Second Division in the U.S. Open Cup.

Laventure was released by the Red Bulls on March 17, 2008, and subsequently joined Newark Ironbound Express in the USL Premier Development League for the 2008 PDL season. Laventure scored nine goals in 13 games in his first season for Ironbound, helping the team reach the post-season playoffs at the first attempt.

=== International ===
In 2007, Laventure was called up to the Haitian national team, but did not play for the country. In 2008, he was called up again, and started two matches against El Salvador in Port-au-Prince, Haiti.

== Personal ==
In November 2006 he, along with his then-New York Red Bulls team mates Seth Stammler and Jozy Altidore, accompanied Haitian-born Grammy Award winning musician Wyclef Jean on a six-day service trip to Haiti for Jean's charitable organization, Yéle Haiti.
