= Adrian Kekec =

Canadian soccer player

Personal information
- Full name: Adrian Russel Kekec
- Date of birth: May 28, 1985 (age 41)
- Place of birth: Vancouver, British Columbia
- Height: 5 ft 9 in (1.75 m)
- Positions: Winger; attacking midfielder

Youth career
- 2005: Capilano Blues
- 2006–2008: Trinity Western Spartans

Senior career*
| Years | Team | Apps | (Gls) |
| 2008, 2010–2012 | Abbotsford Mariners^{[A]} | 29 | (10) |
| 2008 | Livar | 3 | (0) |
| 2009 | Sloga Mravince | 10 | (3) |
| 2010 | Solin | 13 | (1) |
| 2010–2012 | Vancouver Olympics FC | 36 | (37) |
| 2013 | Pelister | 10 | (0) |
- * Club domestic league appearances and goals as of 1 August 2013

Adrian Kekec (born May 28, 1985) is a Canadian soccer player of Slovenian descent, who currently plays for FK Pelister in the First Macedonian Football League. Kekec is a versatile attacker who can play both as a winger and forward.

== Career ==
=== Youth and college ===
Kekec was born in Vancouver, British Columbia, and went to Alpha Secondary School in Burnaby, BC. After graduating he played college soccer for the Capilano Blues. After a very strong showing in his first year of collegiate soccer, Kekec transferred to Trinity Western University where he would go on to have a very successful CIS career breaking numerous records at TWU including most goals in a single season and all-time leading scorer.

=== Professional ===
In the summer of 2008, Kekec signed with then Slovenian PrvaLiga side NK Ivančna Gorica but decided to forgo to finish his last year of eligibility with TWU. Shortly after finishing his collegiate career he signed with HNK Sloga Mravince. Kekec made an instant impact with Sloga Mravince and quickly became a fan favourite in his attacking midfield role. NK Solin began to take notice of his playmaking ability after a Sloga Mravince match in which Kekec gathered the ball from half and beat five opponents in succession before unselfishly laying the ball off to a teammate to tap into the open net. During the 2010 winter transfer window, NK Solin successfully acquired the attackers services. The speedy forward spent the later half of 2010 to 2012 playing for Vancouver Olympics, a club which has served as a stepping stone to professional football for many Canadian players including FC Twente goalkeeper Daniel Fernandes and Toronto FC midfielder Gianluca Zavarise. After two impressive seasons for Vancouver Olympics FC under coach Dino Anastopulos, Kekec signed with FK Pelister on January 22, 2013.

During the second half of the 2012–13 season he played with FK Pelister in the Macedonian First League.

== Notes ==
A. Played with Fraser Valley Mariners during 2008 and on loan in 2011-2012 from Vancouver Olympics FC.
