= Cascade Surge =

American soccer team

- Full name: Cascade Surge
- Nickname: The Surge
- Founded: 1995
- Dissolved: 2009
- Ground: McCulloch Stadium
- Capacity: 2,500
- Owner: Surge International
- Chairman: Dave Irby
- Head Coach: Mike Alfers
- League: USL Premier Development League
- 2009: 4th, Northwest did not qualify for playoffs
Home colors	Away colors

Cascade Surge was an American soccer team based in Salem, Oregon, United States. Founded in 1995, the team played in the USL Premier Development League (PDL), the fourth tier of the American Soccer Pyramid, until 2009, when the franchise folded and the team left the league.

The team played its home games at McCulloch Stadium on the campus of Willamette University, where they played since 2004. The team's colors were blue and white.

== History ==
The team from Salem first joined the old USISL Pro League in 1995 as the Oregon Surge. one of 20 expansion franchises; placed in the Northwest Division, the team was competitive from the start, finishing second in the table behind the Hawaii Tsunami with a 14–6 record (ties were settled on penalties). The playoffs also proved to be a successful venture: a 3–2 win over the Everett BigFoot led the team to the divisional finals, where they again were defeated by the Tsunami, but the season indicated a positive future.

The Pro League was realigned in 1996, and the newly titled Cascade Surge found life more difficult in their sophomore year, finishing a distant sixth in the table behind the BigFoot and the San Fernando Valley Golden Eagles with a 7–9 record. Things improved in 1997 as the Pro League renamed itself to the Premier Development Soccer League, and Cascade were more competitive, finishing third in the Northwest behind the Spokane Shadow and Yakima Reds, but losing in the playoffs at the first attempt 1–0 to Yakima.

The team continued to experience inconsistency in 1998, as they finished their year fourth behind the Shadow and out of the playoffs, and 1999 was the worst season yet, as Cascade finished rock bottom of the Northwest Division with just 2 wins all year, 17 points adrift of the team above them (the Reds) and an astonishing 54 points behind divisional champions Willamette Valley Firebirds. Things did not get much better with the turn of the millennium, although the Surge did avoid a second consecutive wooden spoon by finishing one place ahead of the Firebirds with a 5–11–2 record.

Original Cascade Surge logo

The 2001 season continued the run of poor performances as the Surge continued to be dominated by their Northwest Division counterparts. They finished outside the playoffs for the fourth consecutive year, in fourth place behind divisional champions Calgary Storm, but they did manage to pick up seven wins on the season. The Surge improved further in 2002, returning to the playoffs after finishing third in the northwest behind the Seattle Sounders Select. Against all odds, the Surge made it all the way to the Conference Championship game, but went down 3–2 to the Southern California Seahorses. Signs, however, were positive that Surge's form was finally turning around.

The Cascade's excellent form continued in 2003; somewhat surprisingly, the team was better on the road than they were at home, enjoying a five-game winning streak away from Legion Field in May and June. This included an impressive 2–0 win over the Calgary Storm Prospects. Despite enduring a 6–0 drubbing from the Shadow, Cascade won five of their last eight regular season games to finish second in the table behind Spokane. This was enough to earn them a playoff spot for the second year in a row. Although they lost their first playoff game 2–1 to eventual conference champions Orange County Blue Star, the Surge nevertheless enjoyed a significant turnaround in form.

2004 saw the Cascade finally capture their first divisional title, just overtaking the Shadow on goal difference. The Surge won 11 of their 16 regular season games, and posted some impressive results, including a 4–1 thrashing of the Reds in May, a 5–1 drubbing of the Shadow in early July, and an impressive 5–0 demolition of the Abbotsford Rangers on the final day of the regular season which gave them their title. Once again, however, the playoff run was to be frustratingly short, as they lost 2–1 to the Fresno Fuego first time out. Glenn Duerr and Ukrainian striker Andriy Budnyy were the top scorers, with 12 goals between them, while Dana McGregor contributed an impressive six assists.

Cascade captured their second divisional title in 2005 with a 12–2–2 record, 8 points clear of their closest rivals, the Shadow, and with the sixth best stats in the country. For the second year in a row were dominant, winning their first eight games in succession, and enjoying a number of comprehensive victories on the season: 4–0 over the Nevada Wonders, 5–1 over the Rangers and 5–2 over the Shadow. Cascade's superb early season form also saw them quality for their first ever US Open Cup, although they lost first time out 4–2 on penalties to the Salinas Valley Samba of the National Premier Soccer League. The team made their second trip to the conference final, but were again frustrated by opponents from southern California, losing 3–0 to the Blue Star. Once again Andriy Budnyy was the top marksman with 11 goals amongst the best in the country, while Matthew Clark and Carlos Calderson were amongst the top assist contributors in the league.

Expansion came to the Northwest in 2006, but no-one could have predicted the astonishing turnaround in form Cascade suffered this year. Having been almost invincible in 2005, they managed just 3 wins all season – 1–0 over new boys Tacoma F.C., 2–0 over the BYU Cougars, and 2–1 over Tacoma again. Cascade's defense was atrociously leaky, conceding 4 goals or more on seven different occasions, while up front only midfielder Kenneth Davis was providing any attacking potency - although it is perhaps indicative that, as the team's top scorer, he only registered three goals all season. Inevitably, Cascade finished the season adrift at the bottom of the Northwest, 19 points behind the champion Rangers.

The poor form exhibited in 2006 continued in 2007 as the Surge finished the season 7th out of seven, a full 30 points behind the champion Cougars, again with just three wins. The highlight of the year was a 3–1 win on the road over the Spokane Spiders which featured a hat trick by Stefan Ostergren, but once again it was Surge's wilting defence which made them suffer: their worst result of the year came on the final day, when they went down 6–1 to the Ogden Outlaws. All this was despite the heroic efforts of Ostergren, who almost single-handedly took on the responsibility for Cascade's scoring activity. His 12 goals made him the fifth highest goal scorer in the country, and made him the lone bright spark in a second dismal season in a row for the Surge.

The Surge were desperate to recapture the successes of old in 2008, and hoped that new head coach Larry Delamarter would help, but they got off to the worst possible start. The Surge lost five of their opening nine games of the season, going down 4–0 at the Tacoma Tide, 5–1 at the Cougars, and 5–0 at home to the Abbotsford Mariners, scoring just four goals in response, and were effectively eliminated from playoff contention by the middle of June. They did not up their first win of the season, 2–1 over Tacoma, until June 21, and although they went on to enjoy subsequent victories – 2–0 over the Reds and a comprehensive 5–1 thrashing of the Spiders on the final day of the season – Cascade never looked to be in contention throughout the year, and continued to be a shadow their former selves. They eventually finished 8th in the Northwest, just one point ahead of last place Spokane; Stefan Ostergren was again the team's single potent striker, with 5 goals, while Chris Andre contributed three assists. Ostergren (University of Akron) went on to play for Brilla FC (PDL), before spending three seasons in Vienna, Austria.

The Surge's final season saw the Surge add on future pros: Te Te Bangura, Juan Chang and Ben Sippola, who helped propel them on a 7-game unbeaten streak in the middle of the season (5–0–2) and within striking range of the playoffs before a late season collapse left the team one spot short, but with a winning record in their final season of play.

On 13 October 2009, Surge President David Irby announced that the club was withdrawing from PDL competition and folding with immediate effect, stating that "changes in the economy made it harder to keep the team operating.". The team owned by Surge International, a 501(c) nonprofit organization (www.surgesoccer.com) would continue designing and implementing soccer projects for ministries around the world, including having a base of operations in Vienna, Austria where former Surge players could go to continue their soccer careers, along with other qualified players.

== Players ==
=== Final squad ===
vs Yakima Reds, July 18, 2009 Note: Flags indicate national team as defined under FIFA eligibility rules; some limited exceptions apply. Players may hold more than one non-FIFA nationality.

No.	Pos.	Nation	Player
0	GK	USA	Aaron Franklin
1	GK	USA	Steve Reese
2	DF	USA	Christopher Smerke
3	FW	GUA	Juan Chang
4	DF	USA	Jacob Briscoe
6	FW	MEX	Jorge Marquez
7	MF	USA	Luke Babson
8	MF	USA	Grant Knight
9	DF	SCO	Tom Milroy
10	MF	USA	Chris Andre
11	FW	SLE	Teteh Bangura

No.	Pos.	Nation	Player
12	DF	USA	Zachary Patterson
13	DF	USA	Joseph Mueller
14	MF	USA	Ben Sippola
15	MF	NAM	Likuis Hafeni
16	FW	USA	Erik Kaufman
17	MF	ENG	Aaron Patrick
21	DF	USA	Jordan Harris
26	FW	USA	Armando Rodriguez
27	MF	USA	Benjamin Stoddard
28	MF	USA	Nathan Murphy
32	DF	USA	Mark Mendenhall

== Year-by-year ==
Year	Division	League	Regular season	Playoffs	Open Cup
1995	3	USISL Pro League	2nd, Northwest	Divisional Finals	Did not qualify
1996	3	USISL Pro League	6th, Western	Did not qualify	Did not qualify
1997	4	USISL PDSL	3rd, Northwest	Division Semifinals	Did not qualify
1998	4	USISL PDSL	4th, Northwest	Division Semifinals	Did not qualify
1999	4	USL PDL	6th, Northwest	Did not qualify	Did not qualify
2000	4	USL PDL	5th, Northwest	Did not qualify	Did not qualify
2001	4	USL PDL	4th, Northwest	Did not qualify	Did not qualify
2002	4	USL PDL	3rd, Northwest	Conference Finals	Did not qualify
2003	4	USL PDL	2nd, Northwest	Conference Semifinals	Did not qualify
2004	4	USL PDL	1st, Northwest	Conference Semifinals	Did not qualify
2005	4	USL PDL	1st, Northwest	Conference Finals	Qualifying Round
2006	4	USL PDL	6th, Northwest	Did not qualify	Did not qualify
2007	4	USL PDL	7th, Northwest	Did not qualify	Did not qualify
2008	4	USL PDL	7th, Northwest	Did not qualify	Did not qualify
2009	4	USL PDL	4th, Northwest	Did not qualify	Did not qualify

== Honors ==
- USL PDL Northwest Division Champions 2005
- USL PDL Northwest Division Champions 2004

== Head coaches ==
- (United States) Jeff Enquist (1996)
- (United States) Dan Birkey (1996)
- David Irby (1997–2001)
- Miguel Camarena (2001–2003)
- Phil Wolf (2004)
- (Scotland) Martin Rennie (2005)
- (United States) Gary McIntosh (2006–2007)
- (United States) Larry Delamarter (2008)
- (United States) Mike Alfers (2009)

== Stadiums ==
- Legion Field; Woodburn, Oregon (2003)
- Stadium at McNary High School; Keizer, Oregon, 1 game (2003)
- McCulloch Stadium; Salem, Oregon (1995–2002, 2004–2009)

== Average attendance ==
Attendance stats are calculated by averaging each team's self-reported home attendances from the historical match archive at https://web.archive.org/web/20100105175057/http://www.uslsoccer.com/history/index_E.html and from Kenn.com https://kenn.com/blog/soccer/all-time-usl-third-division-attendance/ and https://kenn.com/blog/soccer/all-time-usl-league-two-attendance/.

- 1995: NA Playoffs: 2,542
- 1996: 1,513 (2nd in Pro League)
- 1997: 1,228 (4th in PDSL)
- 1998: 745 (5th in PDSL)
- 1999: 309 (14th in PDL)
- 2000: 488 (6th in PDL)
- 2001: 343 (13th in PDL)
- 2002: 234 (25th in PDL)
- 2003: 345 (22nd in PDL)
- 2004: 349 (27th in PDL)
- 2005: 402 (21st in PDL)
- 2006: 409 (20th in PDL)
- 2007: 541 (19th in PDL)
- 2008: 329 (31st in PDL)
- 2009: 388 or 370 (29th in PDL)
