= Wichita Jets =

Former Kansas football team

Wichita Jets are a defunct soccer club that played in the 2000 USL Premier Development League season. They played in Wichita, Kansas.
