= Wisconsin Rebels =

- Full name: Wisconsin Rebels
- Nickname(s): The Rebels
- Founded: 1998
- Dissolved: 2004
- Stadium: Calder Stadium
- Capacity: 4,100
- Chairman: Dan Doucette
- League: USL Premier Development League
- 2004: 10th, Heartland Division

Wisconsin Rebels were an American soccer team, founded in 1998, originally as the Fox River Rebels. The team was a member of the United Soccer Leagues Premier Development League (PDL), the fourth tier of the American Soccer Pyramid, until 2004, when the team left the league and the franchise was terminated.

The Rebels played their home games at Calder Stadium in the city of Menasha, Wisconsin, 105 miles north of the state's largest city, Milwaukee. The team's colors were green, white and black.

== Year-by-year ==
Year	Division	League	Reg. season	Playoffs	Open Cup
1998	4	USL PDL	4th, Great Lakes	Did not qualify	Did not qualify
1999	4	USL PDL	3rd, Great Lakes	Did not qualify	Did not qualify
2000	4	USL PDL	4th, Heartland	Did not qualify	Did not qualify
2001	On Hiatus				
2002	4	USL PDL	8th, Heartland	Did not qualify	Did not qualify
2003	4	USL PDL	8th, Heartland	Did not qualify	Did not qualify
2004	4	USL PDL	10th, Heartland	Did not qualify	Did not qualify

== Coaches ==
- (United States) Kris Kelderman 2000
- (United States) James Huff 2001

== Stadia ==
- Calder Stadium, Menasha, Wisconsin 2003–04
- Waupaca Stadium, Waupaca, Wisconsin 2003 (1 game)
- Portage County Youth Soccer Complex, Stevens Point, Wisconsin 2004 (1 game)
