= Yakima Reds =

- Full name: Yakima Reds
- Nickname: The Reds
- Founded: 1995
- Dissolved: 2010
- Ground: Marquette Stadium; Yakima, Washington
- Capacity: 1,500
- Owners: Jere Irwin
- League: USL Premier Development League
- 2010: 8th, Northwest; Playoffs: DNQ
Home colors	Away colors

Yakima Reds was an American soccer team based in Yakima, Washington, United States. Founded in 1995, the team played in the USL Premier Development League (PDL), the fourth tier of the American Soccer Pyramid, in the Northwest Division of the Western Conference. The franchise folded at the end of the 2010 season and left the league thereafter.

The team played its home games at Marquette Stadium. The team's colors were red and white.

== History ==
The Yakima Reds joined the USISL Pro League in 1995, and were placed in the Northwest Division, but finished their first year of national competition with just 4 wins, a distant fifth behind divisional champions Hawaii Tsunami. 1996 was better for the Reds, missing out on playoffs on goal difference, finishing third behind Everett Bigfoot and the San Fernando Valley Golden Eagles. Yakima made their first trip to the playoffs in 1997 after finishing the regular season second to Spokane Shadow; a 1–0 victory over Cascade Surge took them to the Conference finals, where they were defeated 2–0 by Spokane, but it still promised better things for the men from Washington state.

1998 was the best season yet in Yakima's history. For the second year in a row they finished the regular season second to Spokane Shadow, but the playoffs were a different story – a 1–0 win over Seattle BigFoot in the divisional semi-finals was followed by a resounding 4–1 win over Okanagan Challenge in the Divisional final, and although they lost 4–2 to eventual national champions San Gabriel Valley Highlanders in the regional final, the performance was indicative that Yakima were beginning to grow into a regional powerhouse.

Or so they thought. 1999 was disappointing for Yakima as they suffered a turnaround in form and finished a lowly 5th in the table behind champions Willamette Valley Firebirds. Things turned around superbly in 2000, however, as Yakima ran away to take their first ever Northwest Division title, six points clear of second place Spokane Shadow. The playoff were a massive success; a 2–0 win over Spokane took them to the Conference championship game, where they duly dispatched the Colorado Comets 1–0 to move onto the national stage. In the final four, Yakima went down on the wrong end of a comprehensive 5–0 scoreline to the Mid Michigan Bucks, and they even lost the consolation game 5–2 to Westchester Flames, but to finish fourth in the country was a huge achievement. To add to the honors, Nate Nelson was named PDL Defender of the Year, and Hector & Teresa Vega received the Organization of the Year honor.

After the exploits of the previous year, 2001 was disappointing for the Reds, as they finished 5th of six in the Northwest Division behind champions Calgary Storm, and with just 5 wins all season. The 2001 season was the catalyst for a general decline in Yakima's form. 2002 was worse as they finished rock bottom of their division, again with just 5 wins all season. Yakima were better in 2003, but still missed out on the playoffs, despite enjoying several impressive wins. A 5–1 thumping of Calgary Storm Prospects was the highlight of the year, and they eventually finished the season in third place.

2004 was difficult for Yakima. Four straight defeats at the beginning of the season set the level for the rest of the season; somewhat shockingly, Yakima's home form was quite atrocious, and they failed to pick up a win at Marquette Stadium until the end of June with a 4–2 victory over Spokane Shadow. It was not until the end of the season that the Reds began putting up any kind of resistance, and they finished their campaign with back-to-back wins 4–2 over Fresno Fuego and 5–2 over Abbotsford Rangers, but it was too little too late. The year ended with Yakima fourth of four in the Northwest.

The 2005 season was not much better for Yakima, although at least the win tally increased to four: all their wins came at home, twice against Abbotsford Rangers and twice against Spokane Shadow. To be fair to the Reds, most of their games were tight 1–0, 2–1 or 3–2 scorelines, so in many respects Yakima could consider themselves unlucky to not have achieved more, but their inability to finish out games from leading positions was their downfall, and they eventually finished third in the table, out of playoffs once more. Jared Auckland and Santa Maria Rivera-Valdovinos were the team's top scorers, with 4 each.

There was more of the same in 2006, although with the expansion of the division Yakima did enjoy a few more wins. However, inconsistency remained the Reds main problem, and their inability to string together a run of winning results was frustrating. A pair of 4–0 wins – one over Cascade Surge, one over Abbotsford Rangers – were the highlights of the year, but in the end their lack of confidence and their spotty form left them third in the table behind Abbotsford, and just out of the playoffs again. However, their two star goal scorers, Cameron Mertens and Christopher Sardon, did net an impressive 16 goals between them, a testament to Yakima's improved fortunes in front of goal.

However, Yakima's fortunes took a turn for the worse in 2007. The team won just three games and scored just 21 goals all season, and eventually finished a full 29 points adrift of divisional champions BYU Cougars. Their wins – 2–1 over Cascade Surge at home, 1–0 over Ogden Outlaws on the road in Utah, and 5–3 over Spokane Spiders at home on the final day of the season – were scant reward for the Yakima fans who endured watching their team lose 8 straight games from mid-June to the end of July, including a 5–0 walloping by Tacoma Tide. Only Puerto Rican striker José García offered any striking potency, leading the goal scorers list with 3 for the season.

2008 saw great excitement with the return to Yakima of one of its most famous sons, Jake Sagare, who was to lead the Reds' lineup all year. The Reds started 2008 like a rocket, winning five of their first six games, including impressive wins over Spokane Spiders and Tacoma Tide, the latter of which featured a brace from on-form striker Junior Garcia. Yakima's dominant early-season form also saw them qualify for their first ever US Open Cup, and they were drawn away in the first round to reigning USL2 champions, Harrisburg City Islanders. Sadly for the Reds, they were outclassed a long way from home in Pennsylvania, as Harrisburg ran out 5–1 winners. June was a more difficult month for Yakima, as they went from back-to-back victories to a trio of defeats to Spokane, BYU Cougars and Ogden Outlaws. To their credit, the Reds regrouped for a final push and, following their hard-fought 1–0 win over rivals Vancouver Whitecaps Residency, were one of three teams heading into the final games with a genuine shout at the playoffs. A dominant 4–1 win over Abbotsford Mariners in the penultimate game – in which Garcia scored 2 goals and had 2 assists – left Yakima facing Tacoma Tide in a winner-take-all final game. Unfortunately for the Reds, Tacoma took the home field advantage all the way to a 6–2 victory, which left Yakima a close third in the Northwest table, just missing out on a playoff spot. Junior Garcia was the top scorer in the entire PDL, with 15 goals, and was subsequently named the national MVP, the first time that honor had ever been given to a Yakima player.

On 25 September 2008, the Reds' management announced that the club was folding and withdrawing from the USL, citing the economic climate and the financial difficulties being suffered by the ownership group, Irwin Research & Development, as the reasons. However, on 17 November 2008, the club announced that a last-minute takeover of the club's ownership had taken place by local businessman Perry Piercy, and that the Reds would continue to compete in 2009. Unfortunately for Yakima, the optimism and enthusiasm at being afforded a last-minute reprieve did not translate to positive results on the pitch; they struggled all year, ultimately winning just three regular season games. The first victory of the season came at the end of May, a 2–0 victory at home over the Spokane Spiders, but by that time Yakima had already lost four, including a 4–0 hammering by the Seattle Wolves on the opening day of the season, and an 8–2 thrashing by Portland Timbers U23's where the Oregonians were 4–1 ahead at half time. Mid-June was Yakima's high spot, when they won two-games back to back, unexpectedly thrashing Tacoma Tide 4–1 off the back of a Vinicius Oliveira hat trick, and then annihilating the Abbotsford Mariners 6–1 in the next game, with Oliveira again the catalyst, hitting four goals. This was as good as it got, though, and normal service was resumed shortly thereafter. The Yakima defense leaked goals, letting Tacoma get their revenge by scoring four, and then allowing 18 goals in three consecutive games as they lost 6–1 to the Victoria Highlanders, 6–0 to Vancouver Whitecaps Residency, and 6–0 to Abbotsford, who were clearly keen to make up for their earlier humiliation. They finished the year second from bottom in the Northwest, saved from the wooden spoon only by the Spokane Spiders. Vinicius Oliveira was clearly the Reds' standout player, hitting 10 goals and providing 3 assists in his 14 appearances for the team,

== Players ==
=== Notable former players ===
This list of notable former players comprises players who went on to play professional soccer after playing for the team in the Premier Development League, or those who previously played professionally before joining the team.

- (United States) Byron Alvarez
- (United States) Mike Chabala
- (United States) Chris Eylander
- (United States) Bobby McAllister
- (United States) Danny Waltman

== Year-by-year ==
Year	Division	League	Regular season	Playoffs	Open Cup
1995	3	USISL Pro League	5th, Northwest	Did not qualify	Did not qualify
1996	3	USISL Pro League	3rd, Western	Did not qualify	Did not qualify
1997	4	USISL PDSL	2nd, Northwest	Division Finals	Did not qualify
1998	4	USISL PDSL	2nd, Northwest	Regional Finals	Did not qualify
1999	4	USL PDL	5th, Northwest	Did not qualify	Did not qualify
2000	4	USL PDL	1st, Northwest	National Semifinals (4th Place)	Did not qualify
2001	4	USL PDL	5th, Northwest	Did not qualify	Did not qualify
2002	4	USL PDL	5th, Northwest	Did not qualify	Did not qualify
2003	4	USL PDL	3rd, Northwest	Did not qualify	Did not qualify
2004	4	USL PDL	4th, Northwest	Did not qualify	Did not qualify
2005	4	USL PDL	3rd, Northwest	Did not qualify	Did not qualify
2006	4	USL PDL	3rd, Northwest	Did not qualify	Did not qualify
2007	4	USL PDL	6th, Northwest	Did not qualify	Did not qualify
2008	4	USL PDL	3rd, Northwest	Did not qualify	1st Round
2009	4	USL PDL	9th, Northwest	Did not qualify	Did not qualify
2010	4	USL PDL	8th, Northwest	Did not qualify	Did not qualify

== Honors ==
- USL PDL Western Conference Champions 2000
- USL PDL Northwest Division Champions 2000

== Head coaches ==
- (Mexico) Ignacio Baez (1995)
- (Brazil) Luiz Marcelo Machado (2004–2006)
- (Mexico) Hector Vega (2007–2009)
- (Brazil) Alex Silva (2010)

== Stadia ==
- Marquette Stadium; Yakima, Washington (2003–2010)

== Average attendance ==
Attendance stats are calculated by averaging each team's self-reported home attendances from the historical match archive at http://www.uslsoccer.com/history/index_E.html.

- 1997: 704 (7th in PDSL)
- 1998: 381 (12th in PDSL)
- 1999: 365 (11th in PDL)
- 2000: 542 (5th in PDL)
- 2001: 394 (11th in PDL)
- 2002: 304 (18th in PDL)
- 2003: 337 (23rd in PDL)
- 2004: 647 (10th in PDL)
- 2005: 368 (24th in PDL)
- 2006: 369 (22nd in PDL)
- 2007: 362 (27th in PDL)
- 2008: 393 (24th in PDL)
- 2009: 253 or 279 (39th in PDL)
- 2010: 255 or 246 (36th in PDL)
