= Ceveriano García =

Mexican footballer (born 1986)

Personal information
- Full name: Ceveriano García Palominos
- Date of birth: 18 July 1986 (age 40)
- Place of birth: Mexico City, Mexico
- Position: Forward

Senior career*
Years	Team	Apps	(Gls)
2006–2008	Yakima Reds	35	(18)
2009	Vista Hermosa		
- * Club domestic league appearances and goals

Ceveriano García Palominos (born 18 July 1986) is a Mexican professional football player. He is currently the soccer coach of the Mabton Vikings soccer team.
