= Godfrey Tenoff =

South African soccer player

Personal information
- Full name: Godfrey Tenoff
- Date of birth: 1 March 1978 (age 48)
- Place of birth: Pietermaritzburg, South Africa
- Height: 5 ft 9 in (1.75 m)
- Position: Midfielder

Youth career
- 1996–1998: Dayton Flyers

Senior career*
Years	Team	Apps	(Gls)
2001–2003	Indiana Blast		
2002	→ Maritzburg United (loan)		
2004–2007	Minnesota Thunder	42	(4)
2008–2009	Cleveland City Stars	24	(1)
- * Club domestic league appearances and goals as of 22 October 2009

Godfrey Tenoff (born 1 March 1978 in Pietermaritzburg) is a South African soccer player, currently without a club.

== Career ==
=== College ===
Tenoff came to the United States from his native South Africa in 1995. He attended the University of Dayton, playing on the men's soccer team from 1996 to 1999, where he twice earned all conference honors and graduated with a degree in sports medicine.

=== Professional ===
Tenoff began his professional career with Indiana Blast, and spent a short period on loan with Maritzburg United back home in South Africa, before moving on to Minnesota Thunder in 2004. He spent four seasons in Minneapolis with the Thunder, playing 42 games and scoring 4 goals for the team. He part of the Minnesota squad which knocked Los Angeles Galaxy out of the Lamar Hunt US Open Cup in 2005.

Tenoff moved to Cleveland City Stars of the USL Second Division in 2008, and helped them to the USL2 title in his first year.
