= Michael Drew =

British chemist

Michael Drew is a professor emeritus of chemistry at the University of Reading. He used to hold the position of head of physical chemistry. His main areas of study were computational chemistry and X-ray crystallography. Within crystallography he was a small molecule crystallographer rather than a protein or DNA crystallographer.
