= Aboubacar Camara =

Aboubacar Camara may refer to:

- Aboubacar Bwanga Camara (born 1986), football defender for the Guinea national football team and AS Kaloum Star
- Aboubacar Camara (dancer), dancer, choreographer, and teacher with Dance Alloy
- Aboubacar Camara (footballer, born 1988), Guinean football midfielder for Sidi Bouzid
- Aboubacar Camara (footballer, born 1993), goalkeeper for the Guinea national football team and CD Huétor Tájar
- Aboubacar Camara (footballer, born 1998), Guinean striker for Ashanti GB
- Aboubacar Camara (footballer, born 2003), Belgian goalkeeper last playing for RAAL La Louvière
- Aboubacar Demba Camara (1944–1973), Guinean singer-songwriter
- Aboubacar Demba Camara (footballer) (born 1994), Guinean football striker for Troyes AC
- Aboubacar Leo Camara (born 1993), football defender for the Guinea national football team and Al-Ansar SC
- Aboubacar M'Baye Camara (born 1985), Guinean football midfielder for RFC Meux
- Aboubacar Sidiki Camara (born 1972), Guinean football forward, played in France and England
- Aboubacar Sidiki Camara (footballer, born 2006), Burkinabe football forward
- Aboubacar Sidiki Camara (politician), Guinean defence minister
