= Palm Beach Pumas =

- Full name: Palm Beach Pumas Soccer Club
- Nickname: The Pumas
- Founded: 2000
- Ground: Palm Beach International Polo Club; Lauderhill Sports Complex
- Capacity: 5,000/1,500
- Chairman: (United States) John Biggs
- Manager: (United States) Bobby Lennon
- League: Florida Elite Soccer League
- 2008: 8th, Southeast Division
Home colors	Away colors

Palm Beach Pumas was an American soccer team based in West Palm Beach, Florida, United States. Founded in 2000, the team played in the USL Premier Development League (PDL), the fourth tier of the American Soccer Pyramid, until 2008, when the franchise folded and the team left the league.

The team played its home games at the Palm Beach International Polo Club in nearby Wellington, Florida, and at the Lauderhill Sports Complex in Fort Lauderdale, Florida. The team's colors were blue, white and orange.

== Year-by-year ==
Year	Division	League	Regular season	Playoffs	Open Cup
2000	4	USL PDL	5th, Southeast	Did not qualify	Did not qualify
2001	4	USL PDL	6th, Southeast	Did not qualify	Did not qualify
2002	4	USL PDL	4th, Southeast	Did not qualify	Did not qualify
2003	4	USL PDL	4th, Southeast	Did not qualify	Did not qualify
2004	4	USL PDL	5th, Southeast	Did not qualify	Did not qualify
2005	4	USL PDL	4th, Southeast	Did not qualify	Did not qualify
2006	4	USL PDL	4th, Southeast	Did not qualify	Did not qualify
2007	4	USL PDL	6th, Southeast	Did not qualify	Did not qualify
2008	4	USL PDL	8th, Southeast	Did not qualify	Did not qualify

== Head coaches ==
- (United States) Bobby Lennon (2005–2006, 2008)
- (United States) Gerry Queen (2007)

== Stadia ==
- Stadium at Palm Beach Community College, Lake Worth, Florida (2003–2005)
- Lantana Sports Complex, Lantana, Florida (2003)
- Stadium at Forest Hill Community High School, West Palm Beach, Florida (2005)
- Palm Beach International Polo Club, Wellington, Florida (2006–2008)
- Lauderhill Sports Complex, Fort Lauderdale, Florida (2008)

== Average Attendances ==
- 2008: 114
- 2007: 88
- 2006: 240
- 2005: 90
