= Mike Hickman =

English footballer

Personal information
- Full name: Michael Frederick Thomas Hickman
- Date of birth: 2 October 1946 (age 80)
- Place of birth: Elstead, England
- Position: Forward

Senior career*
Years	Team	Apps	(Gls)
1965–1968	Brighton & Hove Albion	15	(0)
1968–1975	Grimsby Town	254	(48)
1975	Blackburn Rovers	26	(8)
1975–1977	Torquay United	17	(1)
- * Club domestic league appearances and goals

Michael Frederick Thomas Hickman (born 2 October 1946) is an English former professional footballer who played as a forward.
