= Ryan Trout =

American soccer player

Personal information
- Full name: Ryan Trout
- Date of birth: November 9, 1978 (age 47)
- Place of birth: Harrisburg, Pennsylvania, United States
- Position: Midfielder

Youth career
- 1997–2000: Virginia Cavaliers

Senior career*
Years	Team	Apps	(Gls)
2001–2003	Charleston Battery	65	(10)
2004	Rochester Raging Rhinos	27	(2)
2005	Vancouver Whitecaps	11	(0)
Total		103	(12)

International career
1995	United States U17	3	(0)
- * Club domestic league appearances and goals

Ryan Trout (born November 9, 1978) is an American former professional soccer player.

Trout was drafted in the fourth round of the 2001 MLS SuperDraft (41st overall) by Colorado Rapids, but did not sign with the club. He played professionally for five seasons with Charleston Battery, Rochester Raging Rhinos and Vancouver Whitecaps.

Trout also represented the United States at the 1995 FIFA U-17 World Championship in Ecuador.
