= Chris Hurley =

Chris Hurley may refer to:

- Chris Hurley (police officer), Queensland police officer involved in the 2004 Palm Island death in custody
- Chris Hurley (footballer) (born 1943), English former footballer
