= Leone Cruz =

American soccer player (born 1987)

Personal information
- Full name: Juan Leone Cruz
- Date of birth: June 13, 1987 (age 39)
- Place of birth: Round Rock, Texas, United States
- Height: 1.83 m (6 ft 0 in)
- Position: Defender

Youth career
- 2006–2010: SMU Mustangs

Senior career*
Years	Team	Apps	(Gls)
2003	Austin Lightning	10	(1)
2004	DFW Tornados	9	(2)
2005	Austin Lightning	7	(3)
2006	DFW Tornados	2	(0)
2007–2008	Laredo Heat	18	(1)
2009	Austin Aztex U23	8	(3)
2011	Laredo Heat	4	(1)
2012	Real Salt Lake	0	(0)
2012–2013	Austin Aztex	13	(2)
2014	San Antonio Scorpions	5	(0)
2015	Austin Aztex	12	(0)
- * Club domestic league appearances and goals as of December 31, 2015

Juan Leone Cruz (born June 13, 1987) is an American soccer player who played for Austin Aztex in the USL Pro.

== Career ==
=== College and amateur ===
Cruz made a total of 67 appearances for the SMU Mustangs and finished with nine goals and five assists.

Cruz also played in the USL Premier Development League for the Austin Lightning, the DFW Tornados, the Laredo Heat and the Austin Aztex U23. Cruz won two PDL National Championships, the first in 2007 (Laredo) and the second in 2013 (Austin).

=== Professional ===
On January 13, 2011, Cruz was drafted in the second round (21st overall) of the 2011 MLS SuperDraft by Seattle Sounders FC.

On March 1, 2012, Real Salt Lake signed Cruz to a professional contract.

After a NASL championship season with the San Antonio Scorpions, Cruz re-signed with the Aztex on January 29, 2015.
