= Gary McIntosh =

American professor and church consultant

Gary L. McIntosh
- Born: Gary Lynn McIntosh; February 9, 1947 (age 79); Colorado Springs, Colorado, U.S.
- Citizenship: United States
- Education: Rockmont College (BA); Western Seminary (MDiv); Fuller Theological Seminary (DMin, PhD)
- Occupations: Professor, author, church consultant, pastor
- Employer: Biola University
- Known for: Church growth movement
- Website: Church Growth Network

Gary Lynn McIntosh (born February 9, 1947) is an American professor, author, pastor, and church consultant. He teaches at Talbot School of Theology at Biola University and founded the Church Growth Network. His books and consulting work address church growth, pastoral leadership, and generational differences in congregations.

== Early life and education ==
McIntosh was born on February 9, 1947, in Colorado Springs, Colorado, to William Vance McIntosh and Billie Colleen Thompson. He sang in vocal programs throughout school and received the senior award for excellence in vocal music at William J. Palmer High School in 1965.

He attended Rockmont College (now Colorado Christian University) from 1965 to 1970, earning a B.A. in Biblical Studies, and married Carol Ann Kurylow in 1968. After a period working in business, he entered pastoral ministry, completing an M.Div. at Western Seminary (Portland, OR) in 1975. He later earned a D.Min. in Church Growth Studies (1982) and a Ph.D. in Intercultural Studies (2005), both from Fuller Theological Seminary.

== Career ==
=== Pastoral and consulting work ===
From 1976 to 1983, McIntosh pastored a church in San Bernardino, California. In 1983 he joined the Institute for American Church Growth as vice president of consulting services, where he consulted with over 300 churches and directed the CGAssociate program, training more than 90 church growth consultants.

In 1987 he founded the Church Growth Network (originally McIntosh Consulting) to provide consulting and training to churches in the U.S. and internationally. He has since conducted more than 800 seminars and presentations in the United States, Canada, Australia, Israel, Japan, Korea, Thailand, Singapore, and the Philippines.

=== Academic career ===
McIntosh joined Talbot School of Theology at Biola University in 1986, where he directed the Doctor of Ministry program and teaches courses in church growth, pastoral leadership, and ministry management. He has also served as an adjunct professor at more than twenty other institutions.

He served as president of the American Society for Church Growth (now the Great Commission Research Network) in 1995 and 1996. He has been editor of the Journal of the American Society for Church Growth and publishes Growth Points, a monthly newsletter for church leaders.

== Publications ==
McIntosh has authored or coauthored more than thirty books. His 1992 book Finding Them, Keeping Them (with Glen S. Martin) addressed evangelism and new member retention. One Size Doesn't Fit All (1999) examined how church size affects congregational strategy. Three Generations (1995), later expanded as One Church, Four Generations (2002), analyzed how Builders, Boomers, Busters, and Bridgers differ in their relationship to church life. Donald A. McGavran: A Biography of the Twentieth Century's Premier Missiologist (2015) documented the life of the founder of the church growth movement.

His work has been reviewed in the Great Commission Research Journal and Outreach Magazine. What Every Pastor Should Know (2013, with Charles Arn) received the Outreach Magazine Resource of the Year Award in Leadership in 2014.

== Personal life ==
McIntosh and his wife Carol have two sons, 9 grandchildren, and 4 great-grandchildren. He is an enrolled member of the Muscogee (Creek) Nation and traces his ancestry to Scottish chiefs from Inverness, Scotland.

== Selected awards ==
- Win Arn Lifetime Achievement Award in Great Commission Research, Great Commission Research Network (2015)
- Donald A. McGavran Award, American Society for Church Growth (1998, 2005)
- Outreach Magazine Resource of the Year Award in Leadership for What Every Pastor Should Know (2014)

== Selected works ==
=== Books ===
- McIntosh, Gary L., and Glen S. Martin. Finding Them, Keeping Them: Strategies for Evangelism and Assimilation. Broadman Press, 1992.
- McIntosh, Gary L. Three Generations: Riding the Waves of Change in Your Church. Fleming H. Revell, 1995.
- McIntosh, Gary L., and Samuel Rima. Overcoming the Dark Side of Leadership. Baker Books, 1997.
- McIntosh, Gary L. One Size Doesn't Fit All: Bringing Out the Best in Any Size Church. Fleming H. Revell, 1999.
- McIntosh, Gary L. One Church, Four Generations: Understanding and Reaching All Ages in Your Church. Baker Books, 2002.
- McIntosh, Gary L., and Charles Arn. What Every Pastor Should Know: 101 Indispensable Rules of Thumb for Leading Your Church. Baker Books, 2013.
- McIntosh, Gary L. Donald A. McGavran: A Biography of the Twentieth Century's Premier Missiologist. Church Leader Insights, 2015.
- McIntosh, Gary L. Growing God's Church: How People Are Actually Coming to Faith Today. Baker Books, 2016.
- McIntosh, Gary L., and Phil Stevenson. Building the Body: 12 Characteristics of a Fit Church. Baker Books, 2017.
- McIntosh, Gary L. The Ten Key Roles of a Pastor: Proven Practices for Balancing the Demands of Leading Your Church. Baker Publishing, 2021.
- McIntosh, Gary L. The Solo Pastor: Understanding and Overcoming the Challenges of Leading a Church Alone. Baker Publishing, 2023.

=== Selected articles ===
- McIntosh, Gary L. "My Pilgrimage in Church Growth." Great Commission Research Journal, Spring 2023, Vol. 15, No. 1, pp. 125–141.
- McIntosh, Gary L. "Church Movements of the Last Fifty Years in North America." Great Commission Research Journal, Vol. 2, No. 1, 2010, pp. 40–49.
- McIntosh, Gary L. "The Glory of God and Church Growth." Journal of the American Society for Church Growth, Vol. 13, No. 2, 2002, pp. 63–73.
