= Zach Kingsley =

American soccer player

Personal information
- Full name: Zach G. Kingsley
- Date of birth: January 18, 1980 (age 46)
- Place of birth: Spokane, Washington, U.S.
- Height: 5 ft 11 in (1.80 m)
- Position: Midfielder

College career
Years	Team	Apps	(Gls)
1998–2001	Washington Huskies		

Senior career*
Years	Team	Apps	(Gls)
2001	Seattle Sounders Select	10	(2)
2002	Seattle Sounders	7	(2)
2002–2004	Colorado Rapids	29	(4)
Total		46	(8)

Managerial career
- 2013: Hawaii Pacific Sharks (women's grad. asst.)
- 2014: Chaminade Silverswords
- 2015–2017: Dominican Penguins
- * Club domestic league appearances and goals

Zach G. Kingsley (born January 18, 1980) is an American former soccer player. He spent his professional career with the Seattle Sounders and the Colorado Rapids.
