= Joe Scigliano =

Canadian former soccer player (born 1977)

Personal information
- Full name: Joseph Scigliano
- Date of birth: April 18, 1977 (age 49)
- Place of birth: Vancouver, Canada
- Position: Forward

Senior career*
Years	Team	Apps	(Gls)
1996–2000	Vancouver 86ers	29	(1)
2000–2003	→ Philadelphia KiXX (indoor)	94	(37)
2004–2007	Columbus Clan F.C.		

International career
1996	Canada U20	5	(0)
- * Club domestic league appearances and goals

Joe Scigliano (born April 18, 1977) is a Canadian former soccer player who played in the USL A-League, National Professional Soccer League, and the Vancouver Metro Soccer League.

== Playing career ==
Scigliano played at the youth level in England with Stoke City F.C. In 1996, he returned to Canada to sign with the Vancouver 86ers in the USL A-League. After three seasons with Vancouver he played indoor soccer with Philadelphia KiXX in the National Professional Soccer League. In the 2001/2002 season he won the league championship. In 2004, he played with the Columbus Clan F.C. in the Vancouver Metro Soccer League, where he won the VMSL Golden Boot Award. In 2007, he won the British Columbia Provincial Soccer Championship, and also reached the finals of the Open Canada Cup.

== International career ==
He made his debut for the Canada men's national under-20 soccer team on April 15, 1996, against Trinidad and Tobago at the 1996 CONCACAF U-20 Tournament.
