= Sound FC (men) =

- Founded: 2006; 19 years ago, as Tacoma FC
- Stadium: Sunset Chevrolet Stadium; Sumner, Washington
- Capacity: 3,000
- Owners: Lane Smith; Cliff McElroy
- CEO: Lane Smith
- Head coach: Jason Prenovost
- 2019: 2nd, Northwest Division; Playoffs: DNQ
- Website: https://soundfc.org/
Home colors	Away colors	Third colors

Sound FC is an American soccer team based in Tacoma, Washington. Founded in 2006, the team most recently played in USL League Two, the fourth tier of the American Soccer Pyramid.

== History ==
Tacoma FC logo, 2006

Tacoma Tide logo, 2007–2011

Seattle Sounders U-23 logo, 2012–2019

=== 2006–2009: Playoffs ===
The Tacoma team was introduced into the league at very short notice in 2006, when it was announced that the now-defunct Spokane Shadow franchise was suspending operations for the season. During their first season, they were simply referred to as Tacoma FC. Under the leadership of Mike Jennings as head coach, Tacoma finished 5th in the Northwest table, 16 points off the leaders. Rory Agu was the top scorer with 5 goals, while Spencer Schomaker registered 3 assists.

2007 began with a new official name, the Tacoma Tide. By the end of the regular season, Tacoma sat in second place in the Northwest division. Rory Agu was again one of Tide's top marksmen with 7 goals, while MLS-bound Ciaran O'Brien notched an impressive 7 goals and 5 assists.

Tacoma was looking to build on their impressive sophomore season in 2008. The Conference Final saw them face divisional rivals Vancouver Whitecaps Residency for a third time. Tacoma was on the receiving end of a 4–1 final score. Rory Agu and Spencer Schomaker ended the year as Tide's top marksmen, with 11 and 9 goals respectively, with Schomaker also contributing 5 assists.

=== 2009–2010: Playoff-less seasons ===
O'Brien was replaced as head coach by former Rochester Rhinos and Seattle Sounders midfielder Greg Howes in 2009, and the change in leadership, combined with the excellence of the expansion teams in the Northwest, seemed to affect Tacoma on the field. A 4–3 loss to the Kitsap Pumas on the final day of the season left the Tide in seventh place, a full 20 points behind divisional champions Kitsap, and out of the playoffs for the first time in three years. Rory Agu was again Tacoma's top scorer, hitting the net 11 times, while Leighton O'Brien provided 4 assists.

2010 began with a change in coaching with former Canadian national team player Gerry Gray replacing Greg Howes. 2010 also saw the team acquire several new players, as well as see some players return from other teams. Chris Sanders joined after a stint with FC Nuremberg and Mark Conrad joined from Kitsap Pumas. Raphael Cox rejoined the team after a year with Real Salt Lake and an MLS Championship. With the two playoff spots locked up by Kitsap and Portland the last game of the season against Kitsap was for pride only. The season was nonetheless an improvement from 2009 with the team finishing third and only narrowly missing out on a playoff spot.

=== 2011 ===
In August 2011, ownership of the team was reorganized as the club sought new investors.

=== 2012–2019: Sounders U-23 ===
On January 25, 2012, it was announced that the Tide will re-brand as Seattle Sounders FC U-23.

=== 2020: Sound FC ===
On January 9, 2020, it was announced that the Seattle Sounders FC had decided to terminate its branding agreement with the club. The club then decided to affiliate with youth club Sound FC. On March 13, 2020, it was announced that Sound FC would not be participating in USL League Two for the 2020 season, with Issaquah-based Sounders youth affiliate Eastside FC taking the team's place in the league instead.

=== Staff ===
As of 13 January 2020.

Executive
Owners	Lane Smith and Cliff McElroy
CEO	Lane Smith
General manager	Jason Prenovost
Coaching
Head coach	Jason Prenovost
Assistant coach	Liviu Bird
Assistant coach	Fawzi Belal
Assistant coach	John Yorke
Assistant coach	Philip Lund
Assistant coach and mental skills coach	Derrek Falor

== Year-by-year ==
Year	Division	League	Regular season	Playoffs	Open Cup	Avg. attendance
Tacoma FC
2006	4	USL PDL	4-8-4 16 points 5th, Northwest	Did not qualify	Did not qualify	106
Tacoma Tide
2007	4	USL PDL	10-4-2 32 points 2nd, Northwest	Conference semifinals	Did not qualify	197
2008	4	USL PDL	11-4-1 34 points 1st, Northwest	Conference finals	Did not qualify	189
2009	4	USL PDL	5-7-4 19 points 7th, Northwest	Did not qualify	Did not qualify	308
2010	4	USL PDL	9-4-3 30 points 3rd, Northwest	Did not qualify	Did not qualify	201
2011	4	USL PDL	1-10-5 8 points 8th, Northwest	Did not qualify	Did not qualify	126
Seattle Sounders U-23
2012	4	USL PDL	11-2-3 36 points 1st, Northwest	Semifinals	Did not qualify	421
2013	4	USL PDL	4-5-5 18 points 4th, Northwest	Did not qualify	2nd Round	538
2014	4	USL PDL	5-2-7 17 points 5th, Northwest	Did not qualify	Did not qualify	414
2015	4	USL PDL	7-1-4 22 points 3rd, Northwest	Semifinals	Did not qualify	—
2016	4	USL PDL	8-6-0 24 points 2nd, Northwest	Divisional Playoff	2nd Round	—
2017	4	USL PDL	6-7-1 19 points 3rd, Northwest	Did not qualify	1st Round	—
2018	4	USL PDL	6-5-3 21 points 2rd, Northwest	Did not qualify	Did not qualify	—
2019	4	USL League Two	7-3-4 25 points 2nd, Northwest	Did not qualify	Did not qualify	—
Sound FC
2020	4	USL League Two	Did not participate; replaced by Eastside FC			

== Honors ==
- USL PDL Northwest Division champions 2008
- USL PDL Northwest Division champions 2012

== Head coaches ==
- (United States) Mike Jennings (2006)
- (Republic of Ireland) Fran O'Brien (2007–2008)
- (United States) Greg Howes (2009)
- (Canada) Gerry Gray (2010–2011)
- (United States) Darren Sawatzky (2012–2018)
- (United States) Jason Prenovost (2019–)

== Stadia ==
- Sunset Chevrolet Stadium; Sumner, Washington
- Franklin Pierce High School; Tacoma, Washington
- Cheney Stadium; Tacoma, Washington
- Tumwater High School; Tumwater, Washington
