= 2007 PDL season =

USL Premier Development League
- Season: 2007
- Champions: Laredo Heat (1st Title)
- Regular Season Champions: Hampton Roads Piranhas (1st Title)
- Matches: 504
- Goals: 1,659 (3.29 per match)
- Best player: (Brazil) Pablo Campos Fresno Fuego
- Top goalscorer: (Brazil) Pablo Campos Fresno Fuego (18 Goals)
- Best goalkeeper: (United States) Evan Newton Hampton Roads Piranhas

The 2007 USL Premier Development League season was the 13th season of the PDL. The season started on April 28, 2007 and ended on July 25, 2007. The league consisted of 63 teams across eight divisions.

Laredo Heat finished the season as national champions, beating the Michigan Bucks on penalty kicks after a 0–0 tie in the PDL Championship game in Laredo, Texas on August 11, 2007.

Hampton Roads Piranhas finished with the best regular season record in the league, winning 14 out of their 16 games, suffering no losses, and finishing with a +36 goal difference.

Fresno Fuego striker Pablo Campos was the league's top scorer, knocking in 18 goals. Thunder Bay Chill's Gustavo Oliveira led the league with 15 assists, while Hampton Roads Piranhas keeper Evan Newton enjoyed the best goalkeeping statistics, with a goals-against average of 0.222 per game, and keeping 8 clean sheets in his 14 games.

== Changes from 2006 ==
=== Name changes ===
- The Williamsburg Legacy changed their name to the Virginia Legacy and unveiled a new logo on January 31, 2007.
- The Raleigh Elite changed their name to the Cary RailHawks U23's after forming a partnership with their USL First Division parent club Carolina RailHawks FC and unveiled a new logo on March 6, 2007.
- Tacoma FC changed their name to Tacoma Tide on March 8, 2007.
- The Virginia Beach Submariners were acquired by and renamed as the Hampton Roads Piranhas on April 6, 2007, after their parent club, the Virginia Beach Mariners, was terminated on March 30.
- The Boulder Rapids Reserve changed their name to the Colorado Rapids U23's on April 12, 2007, as well as their logo and colors, to reflect the changes undertaken by their parent club, the Colorado Rapids.

=== New franchises ===
- Ten teams joined the league this year, including seven brand new franchises:

Team name	Metro area	Location	Previous affiliation
(Louisiana) Baton Rouge Capitals	Baton Rouge area	Baker, LA	expansion
(Virginia) Fredericksburg Gunners	Fredericksburg area	Fredericksburg, VA	expansion
(New York (state)) Long Island Rough Riders	Long Island area	New Hyde Park, NY	previously in USL-2
Mississippi Brilla	Jackson area	Clinton, MS	expansion
(California) Lancaster Rattlers	Antelope Valley area	Palmdale, CA	expansion
(California) San Jose Frogs	Silicon Valley area	San Jose, CA	previously in NPSL
(Washington (state)) Spokane Spiders	Spokane Valley area	Spokane, WA	expansion
(Missouri) Springfield Demize	Springfield area	Springfield, MO	expansion
(Ontario) Toronto Lynx	Toronto area	Toronto	previously in USL-1
(California) Ventura County Fusion	Ventura County area	Ventura, CA	expansion

=== Folding ===
- Six teams left the league prior to the beginning of the season:
  - Ajax Orlando Prospects - Orlando, Florida
  - Augusta Fireball - Augusta, Georgia
  - California Gold - Modesto, California
  - Colorado Springs Blizzard - Colorado Springs, Colorado
  - Kalamazoo Kingdom - Kalamazoo, Michigan
  - San Diego Gauchos - San Diego, California

== Playoff format ==
The top two teams in each division advance to the playoffs, with all playoff matchups consisting of one game. Each conference will hold separate playoffs at a host location. The format for each conference playoff consists of one division winner playing against the other division's second-place club, with winners advancing to the conference final. The winners of each conference play in the national semifinal, determined as such: Central vs Western, Eastern vs Southern. The winners of these matches play in the final match scheduled on August 11.

== Current standings ==
Legend
Division champion
Team qualified for playoff berth

=== Central Conference ===
==== Great Lakes Division ====
Pos	Team	Pld	W	L	T	GF	GA	GD	Pts
1	Michigan Bucks	16	11	2	3	48	15	+33	36
2	Chicago Fire Premier	16	8	4	4	23	17	+6	28
3	West Michigan Edge	16	6	5	5	21	24	−3	23
4	Toronto Lynx	16	6	6	4	25	21	+4	22
5	Indiana Invaders	16	5	9	2	19	31	−12	17
6	Cleveland Internationals	16	5	10	1	22	35	−13	16
7	Fort Wayne Fever	16	4	11	1	21	38	−17	13

==== Heartland Division ====
Pos	Team	Pld	W	L	T	GF	GA	GD	Pts
1	Thunder Bay Chill	16	10	3	3	35	17	+18	33
2	St. Louis Lions	16	10	6	0	39	24	+15	30
3	Kansas City Brass	16	8	3	5	26	28	−2	29
4	Des Moines Menace	16	8	7	1	41	24	+17	25
5	Colorado Rapids U23's	16	7	5	4	37	22	+15	25
6	Springfield Demize	16	4	11	1	16	44	−28	13
7	Sioux Falls Spitfire	16	3	11	2	15	41	−26	11

=== Eastern Conference ===
==== Mid Atlantic Division ====
Pos	Team	Pld	W	L	T	GF	GA	GD	Pts
1	Hampton Roads Piranhas (R)	16	14	0	2	42	6	+36	44
2	Ocean City Barons	16	9	3	4	33	20	+13	31
3	Virginia Legacy	16	9	5	2	27	19	+8	29
4	Reading Rage	16	7	5	4	30	29	+1	25
5	Fredericksburg Gunners	16	7	7	2	31	22	+9	23
6	Richmond Kickers Future	16	5	7	4	23	25	−2	19
7	Northern Virginia Royals	16	3	11	2	15	48	−33	11
8	Delaware Dynasty	16	3	11	2	20	35	−15	11
9	West Virginia Chaos	16	3	11	2	20	37	−17	10 (Note: West Virginia was penalized 1 point for circumstances not released by the USL.)

(R) Regular Season Champions

==== Northeast Division ====
Pos	Team	Pld	W	L	T	GF	GA	GD	Pts
1	Cape Cod Crusaders	16	9	1	6	35	15	+20	33
2	Brooklyn Knights	16	9	4	3	31	24	+7	30
3	Westchester Flames	16	7	4	5	34	17	+17	26
4	Long Island Rough Riders	16	7	6	3	26	22	+4	24
5	Albany Admirals	16	7	7	2	20	27	−7	23
6	Vermont Voltage	16	4	9	3	20	43	−23	15
7	Ottawa Fury	16	3	8	5	17	21	−4	14
8	Rhode Island Stingrays	16	4	11	1	19	33	−14	13

=== Southern Conference ===
==== Mid South Division ====
Pos	Team	Pld	W	L	T	GF	GA	GD	Pts
1	Laredo Heat	16	10	2	4	29	12	+17	34
2	El Paso Patriots	16	8	6	2	19	17	+2	26
3	DFW Tornados	16	7	6	3	22	24	−2	24
4	Mississippi Brilla	16	6	5	5	30	21	+9	23
5	New Orleans Shell Shockers	16	5	6	5	28	22	+6	20
6	Baton Rouge Capitals	16	5	7	4	20	32	−12	19
7	Austin Lightning	16	3	12	1	13	31	−18	10

==== Southeast Division ====
Pos	Team	Pld	W	L	T	GF	GA	GD	Pts
1	Carolina Dynamo	16	11	3	2	41	14	+27	35
2	Central Florida Kraze	16	11	4	1	47	21	+26	34
3	Atlanta Silverbacks U23's	16	10	2	4	32	14	+18	34
4	Bradenton Academics	16	8	4	4	39	19	+20	28
5	Cary RailHawks U23's	16	7	6	3	22	17	+5	24
6	Palm Beach Pumas	15	4	10	1	20	36	−16	11 (Note: Palm Beach was penalized 2 points for circumstances not released by the USL.)
7	Nashville Metros	16	2	11	3	12	32	−20	9
8	Cocoa Expos	15	0	13	2	1	63	−62	2

=== Western Conference ===
==== Northwest Division ====
Pos	Team	Pld	W	L	T	GF	GA	GD	Pts
1	BYU Cougars	16	13	1	2	37	14	+23	41
2	Tacoma Tide	16	10	4	2	36	23	+13	32
3	Ogden Outlaws	16	6	7	3	23	22	+1	21
4	Abbotsford Rangers	16	5	6	5	38	24	+14	20
5	Spokane Spiders	16	6	10	0	25	49	−24	18
6	Yakima Reds	16	3	9	4	22	35	−13	13
7	Cascade Surge	16	3	11	2	17	38	−21	11

==== Southwest Division ====
Pos	Team	Pld	W	L	T	GF	GA	GD	Pts
1	Fresno Fuego	16	10	4	2	41	28	+13	32
2	San Fernando Valley Quakes	16	9	2	5	33	16	+17	32
3	San Jose Frogs	16	10	5	1	24	16	+8	31
4	Ventura County Fusion	16	9	4	3	27	19	+8	30
5	Los Angeles Storm	16	6	5	5	23	25	−2	23
6	San Francisco Seals	16	6	8	2	18	23	−5	20
7	Southern California Seahorses	16	5	6	5	26	24	+2	20
8	Bakersfield Brigade	16	6	10	0	22	29	−7	18
9	Orange County Blue Star	16	3	9	4	18	27	−9	13
10	Lancaster Rattlers	16	2	13	1	23	48	−25	7

== Playoffs ==
=== Playoff bracket ===
Conference Semifinals
MA1	(Virginia) Hampton Roads Piranhas	1 (5)
NE2	(New York (state)) Brooklyn Knights (AET/PSO)	1 (6)
Eastern Conference
NE1	(Massachusetts) Cape Cod Crusaders	5
MA2	(New Jersey) Ocean City Barons	0
GL1	Michigan Bucks	4
HL2	(Missouri) St. Louis Lions	1
Southern Conference
HL1	(Ontario) Thunder Bay Chill	1
GL2	(Illinois) Chicago Fire Premier	3
MS1	(Texas) Laredo Heat	4
SE2	Central Florida Kraze	0
Central Conference
SE1	(North Carolina) Carolina Dynamo	1
MS2	(Texas) El Paso Patriots	0
NW1	(Utah) BYU Cougars	2
SW2	(California) San Fernando Valley Quakes	0
Western Conference
SW1	(California) Fresno Fuego (AET)	4
NW2	(Washington (state)) Tacoma Tide	1

Conference Finals
NE2	(New York (state)) Brooklyn Knights	1
NE1	(Massachusetts) Cape Cod Crusaders	0
GL1	Michigan Bucks	3
GL2	(Illinois) Chicago Fire Premier	0
MS1	(Texas) Laredo Heat	2
SE1	(North Carolina) Carolina Dynamo	1
NW1	(Utah) BYU Cougars	0
SW1	(California) Fresno Fuego	3

National Semifinals
NE2	(New York (state)) Brooklyn Knights	1 (4)
GL1	Michigan Bucks (AET/PSO)	1 (5)
MS1	(Texas) Laredo Heat	1
SW1	(California) Fresno Fuego	0

PDL Championship Game
GL1	Michigan Bucks	0 (3)
MS1	(Texas) Laredo Heat	0 (4)

=== Conference semifinals ===
July 27, 2007
5:00 PM ET

(Virginia) Hampton Roads Piranhas	1 – 1 (AET)	(New York (state)) Brooklyn Knights
Haywood (yellow card) 53'; Joseph 89'; Wheeler (yellow card) 89'		Cambridge (yellow card) 22'; Niebles 44'; Matos (yellow card) 87'; Matteo (yellow card) 89'; Damiani (yellow card) 111'
Penalties
Wheeler (penalty scored); Mottinger (penalty scored); Lima (penalty scored); Kinney (penalty scored); Thomas (penalty missed); Newton (penalty scored); Joseph (penalty missed)	5 – 6	(penalty scored) Matteo; (penalty scored) Charles; (penalty scored) Dragoi; (penalty missed) Berenzen; (penalty scored) Damiani; (penalty scored) Belke; (penalty scored) Cioffi

Carey Stadium
Ocean City, New Jersey
Referee: Daun White (USA)

July 27, 2007
5:30 PM ET

(Ontario) Thunder Bay Chill	1 – 3	(Illinois) Chicago Fire Premier
Gold (yellow card) 3'; Putrus (yellow card) 15' (yellow-red card) 90'; Swartzendruber 57'; Moldenhaur (yellow card) 62'; Alvarado (yellow card) 85'		Hlavaty 53' (PK) (yellow card) 62'; Fleak 76' 77'

Lake Orion High School
Orion Township, Michigan
Referee: (USA)

July 27, 2007
6:30 PM ET

(North Carolina) Carolina Dynamo	1 – 0	(Texas) El Paso Patriots
Franks (yellow card) 12'; Jata 81'		Cervantes (yellow card) 10'; Morin (yellow card) 70'

UISD Student Activity Center
Laredo, Texas
Attendance: 143
Referee: Rudy Nino (USA)

July 27, 2007
7:30 PM ET

(New Jersey) Ocean City Barons	0 – 5	(Massachusetts) Cape Cod Crusaders
Carmichael (red card) 22'; Holloway (yellow card) 24' (red card) 24'; Evans (yellow card) 30'		Chery 36' 49'; Short (yellow card) 44'; Wright 52'; Massie 57' (yellow card) 57'; Nyazamba 72'

Carey Stadium
Ocean City, New Jersey
Attendance: 878
Referee: Mark Geiger (USA)

July 27, 2007
7:30 PM ET

(Utah) BYU Cougars	2 – 0	(California) San Fernando Valley Quakes
Fellows 64' 76'		Shaw (yellow card) 18'; Leslie (yellow card) 59' (yellow-red card) 72'; Borak (yellow card) 63'; Paladini (yellow card) 68'

Chukchansi Park
Fresno, CA
Attendance: 2,746
Referee: Colin Arblaster (USA)

July 27, 2007
8:00 PM ET

Michigan Bucks	4 – 1	(Missouri) St. Louis Lions
Dube 26'; Jafta (yellow card) 45'; Holody 79'; Djokic 86'; Uzoigwe 90'		Clayes (yellow card) 29'; Angus 45' (yellow card) 70'

Lake Orion High School
Orion Township, Michigan
Referee: (USA)

July 27, 2007
9:30 PM ET

(Texas) Laredo Heat	4 – 0	Central Florida Kraze
Morales 4' (yellow card) 4' (goal) 26'; Galvan 7'; Ibarra 60'; Mulamba (yellow card) 64'; Macias (yellow card) 89'		Herbet (yellow card) 24'

UISD Student Activity Center
Laredo, Texas
Attendance: 1,401
Referee: Jeff Katawar (USA)

July 27, 2007
10:30 ET

(California) Fresno Fuego	4 – 1 (AET)	(Washington (state)) Tacoma Tide
Nunes 22' (yellow card) 38'; Rivera (yellow card) 43'; Blanco (yellow card) 74' (goal) 102'; Cabello (yellow card) 75'; Cignetti (yellow card) 90'; Machado (yellow card) 95' (goal) 108'; Campos 100'		O'Brien (yellow card) 27' (yellow-red card) 74'; David 63'; Schomaker (red card) 102'

Chukchansi Park
Fresno, CA
Attendance: 2,746
Referee: Mike Kampmeinert (USA)

=== Conference finals ===
July 28, 2007
7:30 PM ET

(Massachusetts) Cape Cod Crusaders	0 – 1	(New York (state)) Brooklyn Knights
Barnett (yellow card) 53'; Short (yellow card) 54'; Stratford (yellow card) 88'; Nyazamba (red card) 88'		Dragoi (yellow card) 34' (goal) 38' (PK); Niebles (yellow card) 40'; Cioffi (yellow card) 49'

Carey Stadium
Ocean City, New Jersey
Attendance: 231
Referee: William Guarini (USA)

July 28, 2007
7:30 PM ET

Michigan Bucks	3 – 0	(Illinois) Chicago Fire Premier
Dube 57'; Shipalane 74'; Daniel (yellow card) 79'; Uzoigwe 89'		Katic (yellow card) 42'; Fallon (yellow card) 85'; Ratner (yellow card) 88'

Lake Orion High School
Orion Township, Michigan
Attendance: 653
Referee: (USA)

July 28, 2007
9:05 PM ET

(Texas) Laredo Heat	2 – 1	(North Carolina) Carolina Dynamo
Galvan (yellow card) 32'; Ibarra 48' (PK) (yellow card) 48'; Infante (yellow card) 71'; Morales 74'; Garcia (yellow card) 76'; Blackwell (yellow card) 90'		Loyd (yellow card) 30'; Lahoud 54'; Lewis (yellow card) 84'

UISD Student Activity Center
Laredo, Texas
Attendance: 1,457
Referee: Michael Brow (USA)

July 28, 2007
10:30 PM ET

(California) Fresno Fuego	3 – 0	(Utah) BYU Cougars
Nunes 5' (PK); Campos 51' (yellow card) 55' (goal) 90'; Vogt (yellow card) 74'		Van Wagenen (yellow card) 80'; De Francis (yellow card) 90'

Chukchansi Park
Fresno, CA
Attendance: 1,872
Referee: Yader Reyes (USA)

=== National Semifinals ===
August 4, 2007
7:30 PM ET

Michigan Bucks	1 – 1 (AET)	(New York (state)) Brooklyn Knights
Clark (yellow card) 17'; Dube 33'		Smith 15'; Matos (yellow card) 60'; Velasquez (yellow card) 108'
Penalties
Uzoigwe (penalty scored); Djokic (penalty scored); Brunner (penalty scored); Shipalane (penalty scored); Holody (penalty scored)	5 – 4	(penalty scored) Matteo; (penalty missed) Dragoi; (penalty scored) Niebles; (penalty scored) Charles; (penalty scored) Belke

Lake Orion High School
Orion Township, Michigan
Attendance: 1,061
Referee: Chad Ulinger (USA)

August 4, 2007
9:05 PM ET

(Texas) Laredo Heat	1 – 0	(California) Fresno Fuego
Quinones (yellow card) 34'; Infante (yellow card) 48'; Garcia 83'; Su (yellow card) 90'		Codeceira (yellow card) 31'; Cabello (yellow card) 64'; Blanco (yellow card) 88'; Nunes (yellow card) 90'

UISD Student Activity Center
Laredo, Texas
Attendance: 2,713
Referee: Colin Tait (USA)

=== National final ===
August 11, 2007

(Texas) Laredo Heat	0 – 0 (AET)	Michigan Bucks
Infante (yellow card) 109'		Nowak (yellow card) 80'; Djokic (yellow card) 86'; Holody (yellow card) 109'
Penalties
Galvan (penalty scored); Ordaz (penalty scored); Morales (penalty missed); Blackwell (penalty scored); Ibarra (penalty missed); Garcia (penalty scored)	4 – 3	(penalty scored) Djokic; (penalty missed) Balc; (penalty scored) Brunner; (penalty scored) Fuzetti; (penalty missed) Holody; (penalty missed) Daniel

UISD Student Activity Center
Laredo, Texas
Attendance: 6,640
Referee: Oscar Ortiz (USA)

Championship MVP: (United States) Felix Garcia (LAR)

== Awards, All–Conference Teams and All-League team ==
=== Year End Awards ===
Scoring Champion: (Brazil) Pablo Campos (Fresno Fuego) (18 Goals, 39 Points)
Golden Boot: (Brazil) Pablo Campos (Fresno Fuego) (18 Goals)
Assists Champion: (Brazil) Gustavo Oliveira (Thunder Bay Chill) (15 Assists)
GAA Champion: (United States) Evan Newton (Hampton Roads Piranhas)
MVP: (Brazil) Pablo Campos (Fresno Fuego)
U19 Player of the Year: (United States) Evan Newton (Hampton Roads Piranhas)
Defender of the Year: (United States) David Horst (Hampton Roads Piranhas)
Goalkeeper of the Year: (United States) Evan Newton (Hampton Roads Piranhas)
Coach of the Year: (United States) John Hall (Hampton Roads Piranhas)

=== Weekly awards ===
Player of the Week
Week	Player	Club	Position	Reason	Ref.
3	(South Africa) Pietro Scalzullo	St. Louis Lions	Midfielder	Two goals, assist in 3–2 win over Springfield Demize	
4	(United States) Andrew Wheeler	Hampton Roads Piranhas	Forward	4 goals in 4–0 win vs Northern Virginia Royals	
5	(South Africa) Nate Jafta	Michigan Bucks	Midfielder	1 goal; 3 assists in pair of wins	
6	(United States) Josh White	Kansas City Brass	Defender	2 game-winners led Brass to Open Cup berth	
7	(United States) Stefan Ostergren	Cascade Surge	Forward	3 goals in 3–1 win over Spokane Spiders	
8	(Canada) Jamie Fairweather	Toronto Lynx	Defender	Two shutouts, goal in 2–0 win at Indiana Invaders	
9	(United States) Kevin Meyer	Westchester Flames	Midfielder	3 goals; 2 assists in win over Vermont Voltage	
10	(Panama) Alejandro Taylor	Central Florida Kraze	Forward	5 goals in pair of wins	
11	(United States) Andrew Hoxie	Virginia Legacy	Forward	5 goals in pair of wins	
12	(United States) Zach De Francis	BYU Cougars	Forward	3 goals, 1 assist in pair of wins	
13	(United States) Kenny Uzoigwe	Michigan Bucks	Forward	Three goals, two assists in win over West Michigan Edge	
14	(United States) Brandon Swartzendruber	Thunder Bay Chill	Forward	5 goals in pair of wins over Des Moines Menace	

Team of the Week
Week	Goalkeeper	Defenders	Midfielders	Forwards	Ref.
3	(United States) Cisneros (BAK)	(United States) Herbert (CFK) (United States) Ashurst (BAK) (United States) Vega (LAR)	(Argentina) Papandrea (AUS) (South Africa) Scalzullo (SLL) (United States) Glover (NAS) (Mexico) Ibarra (LAR) (Guatemala) Sims (SFV)	(England) Draycott (VCF) (United States) Aguilera-Navarro (BAK)	
4	(United States) Austin (WME)	(United States) Sullivan (LIR) (Mexico) Viveros (YAK) (Guam) McDonald (SJF)	(United States) Delgado (CFK) (Czech Republic) Boltnar (DMM) (Mexico) Torres (AUS) (United States) Evans (RKF)	(United States) Shaw (SFS) (United States) Wheeler (HRP) (United States) McCardle (NVR)	
5	(United States) Fitzwater (REA)	(United States) Dorri (KCB) (United States) Palácios (ELP) (England) Quinn (NOS)	(United States) Franklin (SFV) (United States) Boggs (BRA) (South Africa) Jafta (MIC) (Trinidad and Tobago) Stewart (IND)	(Romania) Neagu (FRG) (United States) Grella (LIR) (United States) Aguilera-Navarro (BAK)	
6	(United States) Weant (CAR)	(United States) White (KCB) (United States) Sgueglia (ALB) (Republic of Ireland) Boyle (OCB) (United States) Van Wagenen (BYU)	(Argentina) Papandrea (AUS) (United States) Stacy (WME) (Brazil) Codeceira (FRE)	(United States) Uzoigwe (MIC) (Kenya) Isaac (IND) (United States) Shilawski (CAR)	
7	(United States) Austin (WME)	(United States) Leathers (ATL) (United States) Gilkerson (HRP) (United States) Holody (MIC)	(South Korea) Kim (SFV) (Scotland) Clayes (SLL) (United States) Putrus (TBC) (England) Davies (NOS) (United States) Konicoff (WES)	(England) Draycott (VCF) (United States) Ostergren (CAS)	
8	(Serbia) Bobonja (CFP)	(United States) Martínez (ELP) (Canada) Fairweather (TOR) (United States) Hoss (TAC) (United States) Wayne (VIR)	(Republic of Ireland) Boyle (OCB) (United States) Galvan (LAN) (Republic of Ireland) Lapira (BRC)	(United States) Pereira (COL) (Uruguay) Moreira (BRA) (United States) Swartzendruber (TBC)	
9	(United States) Boudreaux (BRC)	(United States) Massey (BRA) (United States) Bindrup (BYU) (United States) Gilkerson (HRP)	(Romania) Drăgoi (BRK) (United States) Villalobos (LAS) (United States) Meyer (WES) (United States) Broadhead (OGD)	(United States) O'Connor (REA) (United States) Heinemann (SLL) (Kenya) Leboo (KCB)	
10	(United States) Healy (DEL)	(United States) Danbusky (HRP) (England) Botting (DFW) (Trinidad and Tobago) Demmin (MBR)	(Canada) Wiredu (TOR) (Czech Republic) Boltnar (Des Moines Menace) (United States) Clark (BYU) (United States) Frank (SJF)	(United States) Andrews (FRD) (Haiti) Pierre-Louis (CCC) (Panama) Taylor (CFK)	
11	(Republic of Ireland) Sperry (CFP)	(United States) Howard (KCB) (United States) Bolkan (WES) (United States) Zaher (SFV)	(United States) Savage (CFK) (United States) Rowling (REA) (England) Davies (NOS) (United States) McFadden (RIC)	(United States) Hoxie (VIR) (United States) Shomaker (TAC) (United States) Gomez (BAK)	
12	(United States) Connor (SFS)	(England) Quinn (NOS) (Guyana) Pollard (BRK) (United States) Sager (WES)	(United States) Smith (CAS) (United States) Sipos (CLE) (Brazil) Codeceira (FRE) (England) Bradford (SFS)	(United States) Taylor (CFK) (United States) De Francis (BYU) (Scotland) Patterson (DMM)	
13	(United States) Sokolowski (KCB)	(United States) Van Wagenen (BYU) (United States) Leathers (ATL) (Scotland) Monro (CCC) (Guam) McDonald (SJF)	(United States) O'Brien (TAC) (United States) Salinas (CAD) (Brazil) Oliveira (TBC)	(United States) Uzoigwe (MIC) (Canada) Gonsalves (RIS) (United States) Judice (BRC)	
14	(United States) Mitrovich (ATL)	(Nigeria) Marsh (CLE) (United States) Adams (CAD) (United States) Santiago (CFK)	(United States) Schmidt (ABB) (South Africa) Jafta (MIC) (Mexico) Barrera (ELP) (United States) Evans (OCB)	(Brazil) Campos (FRE) (United States) Swartzendruber (TBC) (United States) Barnett (CCC)	

=== All- Conference Teams ===
==== Central Conference ====
F: (United States) Tommy Heinemann (SLL), (Kenya) Saidi Isaac (IND), (United States) Kenny Uzoigwe (MIC)*,
M: (Czech Republic) Tomas Boltnar (DMM), (United States) Keith Gorzcyca (CLE), (South Africa) Nate Jafta (MIC)*, (United States) Jake Stacy (WME)
D: (United States) Mike Holody (MIC), (United States) Josh Howard (KCB)*, (United States) Josh White (KCB)
G: (Canada) Stephen Paterson (TBC)
Honorable Mention: (United States) Neil Hlavaty, M, CHI; (Canada) Jamie Fairweather, D, TOR; (United States) Matthew Tutich, M, CLE; (United States) PJ Wilson, F, FWF; (United States) Josh Fallin, D, COL; (Jamaica) Omar Shoucair, M, SPR; (England) Adam Douglas, D, SIO

=== Eastern Conference ===
F: (Jamaica) Dwight Barnett (CCC), (United States) Andrew Hoxie (VIR), (United States) Andrew Wheeler (HRP)*,
M: (Romania) Adrian Bumbut (FRD), (Italy) Matia Damiani (BRO), (Australia) KK Lima (HRP), (United States) Matt Narode (ALB)
D: (United States) John Gilkerson (HRP), (United States) David Horst (HRP)*, (Scotland) Graham Munro (CCC),
G: (United States) Evan Newton (HRP)*
Honorable Mention: (United States) Byron Carmichael, F, OCB; (Scotland) Gary Higgins, F, REA; (United States) Jordan Evans, M, RKF; (Brazil) Guillermo Fonseca, M, DEL; (United States) Ryan Jenkins, G, NVR; (England) Chris Whalley, M, WVC; (England) Tom Clements, D, WES; (England) Paul Robson, D, LIR; (United States) Bo Vučković, F, VER; (England) Yan Klukowski, M, OTT; (Canada) Jeff Gonsalves, F, RIS

=== Southern Conference ===
F: (United States) Zak Boggs (BRA), (United States) Tony Judice (BRC), (Panama) Tony Taylor (CFK)
M: (Brazil) Bruno Guarda (DFW)*, (Mexico) Juan Ibarra (LAR), (United States) Ryan Roushandel (ATL), (United States) Shea Salinas (CAD)
D: (Trinidad and Tobago) Dwyane Demmin (MIS)*, (United States) Jonathan Leathers (ATL), (United States) Anthony Santiago (CFK)
G: (United States) Diego Restrepo (BRA)
Honorable Mention: (United States) Omar Mora, G, ELP; (United States) Dustyn Brim, G, NOS; (Argentina) Norberto Papandrea, D, AUS; (United States) Andre Sherard, D, CAR; (United States) Tim McRae, D, PBP; (United States) Jeff Boynton, D, NAS; (Italy) Salvatore Conigliaro, D, COA; ;

=== Western Conference ===
F: (Brazil) Pablo Campos (FRE)*, (England) Mark Draycott (VCF), (United States) Stefan Ostergren (CAS)
M: (Brazil) Fabricio Codeceira (FRE), (United States) Sean Franklin (SFV)*, (United States) Ciaran O'Brien (TAC)*, (United States) Brock Trejo (BYU)
D: (Canada) Brad Peetoom (ABB), (United States) Luke Sassano (SJF), (United States) Hugh Van Wagenen (BYU),
G: (United States) Kevin Guppy (SFV)
Honorable Mention: (United States) Jonny Broadhead, D, OGD; (United States) Jake Moug, F, SPK; (United States) Jorge Lopez, D, YAK; (United States) Ross Schunk, F, LAS; (United States) Eric Conner, G, SFS; (United States) J.T. Searles * denotes All-League selection

=== All-League team ===
F: (Brazil) Pablo Campos (FRE) (League MVP, Scoring Champion, and Golden Boot); (United States) Kenny Uzoigwe (MIB); (United States) Andrew Wheeler (HRP)
M: (United States) Sean Franklin (SFV); (Brazil) Bruno Guarda (DFW); (South Africa) Nate Jafta (MIC); (United States) Ciaran O'Brien (TAC)
D: (Trinidad and Tobago) Dwyane Demmin (MIS); (United States) David Horst (HRP) (Defender of the Year); (United States) Josh Howard (KCB)
G: (United States) Evan Newton (HRP) (Goalkeeper of the Year, and U19 Player of the Year)

== See also ==
- United Soccer Leagues 2007
