= 2013 MLS supplemental draft =

College draft for soccer teams

The 2013 MLS supplemental draft was a secondary draft that was held by Major League Soccer via conference call on January 22, 2013. The draft was four rounds with all 19 MLS clubs participating.

== Selection order ==
The official selection order was announced by Major League Soccer on December 6, 2012:

1. The nine clubs which did not qualify for the playoffs received picks #1 through #9 (in reverse order of season points);
2. The two clubs eliminated in the Knockout round of playoffs received picks #10 and #11 (in reverse order of season points);
3. The four clubs eliminated in the Conference Semifinals received picks #12 through #15 (in reverse order of season points);
4. The two clubs eliminated in the Conference Finals received picks #16 and #17 (in reverse order of season points);
5. The club which lost 2012 MLS Cup received pick #18;
6. The club which won 2012 MLS Cup received pick #19.

This selection order pertained to all rounds of the MLS Supplemental Draft.

Official webpage: http://www.mlssoccer.com/superdraft/2013/supplemental-draft

=== Round 1 ===
Pick #	MLS team	Player	Position	Affiliation
1	New York Red Bulls (Note: #1: Toronto FC → New York Red Bulls. 21 July 2012: New York Red Bulls acquired a conditional draft pick, which became this first-round selection in the 2013 Supplemental Draft, from Toronto FC in exchange for forward Quincy Amarikwa.)	(United States) Ryan Clark	Midfielder	Monmouth
2	Chivas USA	(United States) Jose Diaz	Defender	Riverside; Los Angeles Misioneros
3	Portland Timbers	(United States) David Meves	Goalkeeper	Akron; Chicago Fire Premier
4	New England Revolution	(United States) Jossimar Sanchez	Defender	Connecticut; Central Jersey Spartans
5	Seattle Sounders FC (Note: #5: Philadelphia Union → Seattle Sounders FC. 7 December 2012: Seattle Sounders FC acquired a first-round selection in the 2013 Supplemental Draft and allocation money from Philadelphia Union in exchange for defender Jeff Parke.)	(United States) Will Bates	Forward	Virginia; Reading United AC
6	Los Angeles Galaxy (Note: #6: Colorado Rapids → Los Angeles Galaxy. 14 December 2012: Los Angeles Galaxy acquired a first-round selection in the 2013 Supplemental Draft and allocation money from Colorado Rapids in exchange for forward Edson Buddle.)	(United States) Andy Riemer	Midfielder	Georgetown; Orange County Blue Star
7	FC Dallas	(United States) Cameron Brown	Midfielder	North Carolina
8	Montreal Impact	(Germany) Hakan Ilhan	Forward	UNC Greensboro; Carolina Dynamo
9	Columbus Crew	(United States) Reed Matte	Defender	UAB; Portland Timbers U23s
10	Vancouver Whitecaps FC	(United States) Adam Mena	Midfielder	Notre Dame; Indiana Invaders
11	Vancouver Whitecaps FC (Note: #11: Chicago Fire → Vancouver Whitecaps FC. 5 December 2011: Vancouver Whitecaps FC acquired a first-round selection in the 2013 Supplemental Draft from Chicago Fire in exchange for goalkeeper Jay Nolly.)	(United States) Michael Rose	Midfielder	Notre Dame
12	Philadelphia Union (Note: #12: Real Salt Lake → Philadelphia Union. 17 January 2013: Philadelphia Union acquired this first-round selection, the #17 selection in the 2013 Supplemental Draft, and a second-round selection in the 2013 MLS SuperDraft from Real Salt Lake in exchange for a second-round selection in the 2013 SuperDraft.)	(United States) Eric Schoenle	Defender	West Virginia
13	New York Red Bulls	(Colombia) Michael Bustamante	Midfielder	Boston University; Worcester Hydra
14	Sporting Kansas City	(United States) Christian Duke	Midfielder	San Diego
15	San Jose Earthquakes	(United States) Adam Jahn	Forward	Stanford
16	Seattle Sounders FC	(United States) Kevin Durr	Midfielder	Air Force
17	Philadelphia Union (Note: #17: D.C. United → Real Salt Lake → Philadelphia Union. 29 November 2011: Real Salt Lake acquired a then third-round selection in the 2013 MLS SuperDraft from D.C. United in exchange for defender Robbie Russell. The traded pick is D.C.'s natural selection. On 17 January 2013, Philadelphia Union acquired this first-round selection, the #12 selection in the 2013 Supplemental Draft, and a second-round selection in the 2013 MLS SuperDraft from Real Salt Lake in exchange for a second-round selection in the 2013 SuperDraft. This pick became a first-round Supplemental Draft pick when MLS shortened the 2013 SuperDraft to two rounds.)	(Trinidad and Tobago) Uriah Bentick	Defender	Liberty
18	Houston Dynamo	(United States) Anthony Arena	Defender	Wake Forest; Seattle Sounders FC U-23
19	Chivas USA (Note: #19: Los Angeles Galaxy → Chivas USA. 14 December 2012: Chivas USA acquired a first-round selection in the 2013 Supplemental Draft, a 2013 international roster slot, and the #19 pick in Stage Two of the 2012 MLS Re-Entry Draft from Los Angeles Galaxy in exchange for the #2 pick in Stage Two of the 2012 MLS Re-Entry Draft. The traded Supplemental Draft pick is Los Angeles's natural selection. Los Angeles used the Re-Entry Draft pick to select midfielder Colin Clark.)	(United States) Paul Islas	Forward	Fresno Pacific; Fresno Fuego

=== Round 2 ===
Pick #	MLS team	Player	Position	Affiliation
20	Toronto FC	(Jamaica) Ashton Bennett	Forward	Coastal Carolina
21	Chivas USA	(United States) Joe Franco	Defender	CSU Northridge; Los Angeles Misioneros
22	Portland Timbers	(United States) Chris Hegngi	Midfielder	Ohio State
23	New England Revolution	(United States) Chris Thomas	Forward	Elon
24	Philadelphia Union	(United States) Mark Linnville	Defender	Princeton
25	Colorado Rapids	(Jamaica) Brenton Griffiths	Defender	South Florida
26	FC Dallas	(United States) Kyle Zobeck	Goalkeeper	Valparaiso; Des Moines Menace
27	Montreal Impact	(United States) Jordan LeBlanc	Midfielder	Old Dominion; Virginia Beach Piranhas
28	Columbus Crew	(United States) Daniel Withrow	Goalkeeper	Marshall
29	Vancouver Whitecaps FC	(United States) Brian Rogers	Forward	Harvard
30	Chicago Fire	(United States) John Gallagher	Defender	Penn State
31	Vancouver Whitecaps FC (Note: #31: Real Salt Lake → Vancouver Whitecaps FC. 11 April 2012: Vancouver Whitecaps FC acquired a conditional draft pick, which became this second-round selection in the 2013 Supplemental Draft, from Real Salt Lake in exchange for the rights to defender Chris Estridge.)	(United States) Adam Clement	Defender	Duquesne
32	New York Red Bulls	(United States) Ben Fisk	Midfielder	Washington; Washington Crossfire
33	Sporting Kansas City	(Mexico) Mitchell Cardenas	Midfielder	Campbell
34	New York Red Bulls (Note: #34: San Jose Earthquakes → New York Red Bulls. 30 July 2012: New York Red Bulls acquired a conditional draft pick, which became this second-round selection in the 2013 Supplemental Draft, and a 2013 international roster slot from San Jose Earthquakes in exchange for midfielder Mehdi Ballouchy.)	(Puerto Rico) Marc Cintron	Midfielder	Providence
35	Seattle Sounders FC	(United States) Kevin Olali	Midfielder	South Florida
36	D.C. United	(United States) Evan Raynr	Midfielder	UCLA; Pali Blues
37	Colorado Rapids (Note: #37: Houston Dynamo → Colorado Rapids. 15 September 2010: Colorado Rapids acquired a fourth-round selection in the 2013 MLS SuperDraft and midfielder Brian Mullan from Houston Dynamo in exchange for midfielder Colin Clark and allocation money. The traded pick is Houston's natural selection. This pick became a second-round Supplemental Draft pick when MLS shortened the 2013 SuperDraft to two rounds.)	(Brazil) Stefano Pinho	Midfielder	Fluminense
38	Toronto FC (Note: #38: Los Angeles Galaxy → Toronto FC. No details are known about this trade.)	(Mexico) Jose Gomez	Midfielder	Creighton

=== Round 3 ===
Pick #	MLS team	Player	Position	Affiliation
39	Toronto FC	(New Zealand) Nik Robson	Midfielder	New Mexico
40	Chivas USA	PASS		
41	Portland Timbers	PASS		
42	New England Revolution	(United States) Alex DeJohn	Defender	Old Dominion; Central Jersey Spartans
43	Philadelphia Union	(United States) Jake Keegan	Forward	Binghamton; Jersey Express
44	Colorado Rapids	(Nigeria) Machael David	Midfielder	UC Santa Barbara
45	FC Dallas	(United States) Cam Wilder	Midfielder	Kentucky
46	Montreal Impact	(United States) Luciano Delbono	Midfielder	Wake Forest; Carolina Dynamo
47	Montreal Impact (Note: #47: Columbus Crew → Montreal Impact. 23 March 2012: Montreal Impact acquired a conditional selection in the 2013 Supplemental Draft, which became this third-round pick, from Columbus Crew in exchange for the rights to forward Aaron Schoenfeld. The traded pick is Columbus's natural selection.)	(Colombia) Juan Arbelaez	Midfielder	VCU
48	Vancouver Whitecaps FC	(United States) Joshua Patterson	Forward	Duquesne
49	Chicago Fire	(England) James Belshaw	Goalkeeper	Duke
50	Real Salt Lake	(United States) Brock Granger	Defender	Louisville; Portland Timbers U23s
51	New York Red Bulls	(Senegal) Stephane Diop	Forward	UConn
52	Sporting Kansas City	(United States) Brian Fekete	Defender	Tampa; GPS Portland Phoenix
53	San Jose Earthquakes	(United States) Colin Mitchell	Defender	Oregon State
54	Seattle Sounders FC	(South Africa) Lebogang Moloto	Midfielder	Lindsey Wilson
55	D.C. United	PASS		
56	Houston Dynamo	(United States) Nic Ryan	Midfielder	UC Santa Barbara
57	Los Angeles Galaxy	PASS		

=== Round 4 ===
Pick #	MLS team	Player	Position	Affiliation
58	Toronto FC	(England) Taylor Morgan	Forward	George Mason; Chicago Fire Premier
59	Chivas USA	PASS		
60	Portland Timbers	PASS		
61	New England Revolution	(United States) Gabe Latigue	Midfielder	Elon
62	Philadelphia Union	(Brazil) Leo Fernandes	Midfielder	Stony Brook; Reading United
63	Colorado Rapids	(Brazil) Marcello Castro	Defender	Sacred Heart; Ottawa Fury
64	FC Dallas	(United States) T. J. Nelson	Midfielder	SMU
65	Montreal Impact	PASS		
66	Columbus Crew	(United States) Shawn Sloan	Midfielder	High Point
67	Vancouver Whitecaps FC	(Venezuela) Alejandro Sucre	Forward	Amherst
68	Chicago Fire	(United States) Caleb Konstanski	Defender	Indiana
69	Real Salt Lake	(United States) Max Wasserman	Defender	UConn
70	New York Red Bulls	(United States) Andrew Ribeiro	Midfielder	Creighton; Portland Timbers U23s
71	Sporting Kansas City	(United States) Mike Reidy	Midfielder	Colgate; FC Buffalo
72	San Jose Earthquakes	(Republic of Ireland) Peter McGlynn	Defender	UC Santa Barbara; Ventura County Fusion
73	Seattle Sounders FC	(United States) Jennings Rex	Midfielder	UNC Charlotte
74	D.C. United	(United States) Philip Suprise	Forward	Quinnipiac University
75	Houston Dynamo	(Jamaica) Yannick Smith	Forward	Old Dominion; Virginia Beach Piranhas
76	Los Angeles Galaxy	PASS		

== Other 2013 Supplemental Draft Trade Notes ==
- Toronto FC acquired the #38 pick in the 2013 MLS Supplemental Draft from Los Angeles Galaxy per the official selection order released by MLS on 17 January 2013. Trade details were not released.
- On 30 March 2011, Toronto FC acquired a then third-round selection in the 2013 Supplemental Draft from Colorado Rapids in exchange for midfielder Josh Janniere. The traded pick was reported as Colorado's natural selection. This pick should have become a fourth-round Supplemental Draft selection when the SuperDraft was shortened to two rounds but was not reflected in the official draft order released by MLS on 17 January 2013. It is assumed the trade was for a conditional pick and the conditions were not satisfied.
