= San Jose Frogs =

- Full name: San Jose Frogs Football Club
- Nickname: The Frogs
- Founded: 2005
- Dissolved: 2008
- Ground: James Lick Memorial Stadium
- Chairman: Hartmut Esslinger
- Manager: Aaron Castro
- League: USL Premier Development League
- 2008: 5th, Southwest Division
Home colors	Away colors

San Jose Frogs was an American soccer team based in San Jose, California, United States. Founded in 2005, the team played in the USL Premier Development League (PDL), the fourth tier of the American Soccer Pyramid, until 2008, when the franchise folded and the team left the league.

The team played its home games in PAL Stadium in San Jose in 2006 and 2007, and at James Lick Memorial Stadium on the campus of James Lick High School in 2008. The team's colors were red and black.

The club's nickname, the Frogs, came from the club's owner, German industrial designer Hartmut Esslinger, whose company Frog Design Inc. was responsible for the first Apple Macintosh computer in 1981, amongst other things.

== History ==
=== National Premier Soccer League ===
The Frogs began life in 2005 as an announced expansion franchise in the National Premier Soccer League, but they failed to take to the field in their original season. They finally made their debut in 2006 and impressed immediately, finishing their freshman season with a 12–4–4 record and second in the table behind eventual national champions Sacramento Knights. The Frogs played in PAL Stadium in San Jose in 2006 and 2007, with good support from local soccer fans who were left without a team when the San Jose Earthquakes, a Major League Soccer team, relocated to Houston and became the Houston Dynamo.

=== USL Premier Development League ===
In the 2006–07 offseason, seeking a greater challenge, the team made the previously unprecedented jump from the NPSL to the PDL. Right out of the gate, the Frogs were as impressive in the PDL as they were in the NPSL, winning five of their first six games, including a pair of 2–1 victories against traditional divisional powerhouses Orange County Blue Star and Southern California Seahorses. The consistent run of form continued throughout the season, and despite a couple of defeats to Bakersfield Brigade and Ventura County Fusion, remained one of the four teams in contention for a playoff spot as the season wound down. A 3–2 loss to Fresno Fuego at the beginning of July put a spoke in the wheel, and despite ending their campaign with 2 wins – 4–1 over Orange County Blue Star and 2–0 over the San Francisco Seals – other teams results went against them, and they finished the season a close third, just one point adrift of Fresno Fuego and the San Fernando Valley Quakes. Jacob Wilson was the top scorer of the very impressive opening campaign; testament to this was that, in the 2008 MLS SuperDraft, seven Frogs were drafted by Major League Soccer, including Brandon McDonald and Luke Sassano.

For the 2008 season, the Frogs moved to a new home ground, James Lick Memorial Stadium on the campus of James Lick High School, an artificial turf field with permanent American football lines. Also in 2008, the San Jose Earthquakes returned as an expansion franchise, bringing top-flight soccer back to the area. These factors reduced the size of Frogs' crowds considerably, but did not seem to affect the on-field product, which was at times very impressive. They started the season strongly, with three wins in their first four games, including a 3–1 win away at San Fernando Valley Quakes that featured a brace by Andrew Wiedeman and handed the Quakes their first home loss in almost 2 years. However, after this promising start, the rest of the year was one of frustrating inconsistency, in which a dominant win (2–0 over Southern California Seahorses), would be followed by a disappointing loss or a tie. The Frogs did make a finale late push for the playoffs, winning three of their last five games, including a 4–1 over Lancaster Rattlers and a dominant 3–0 away victory over San Francisco Seals on the final day of the season, but in the end it was not enough; they finished the season comfortably mid-table in 5th position. Andrew Wiedeman was the Frogs' top goal scorer with 6 for the season, and also contributed a team-best 3 assists.

In August 2008, the Frogs organization announced that the franchise was closing down, citing a "lack of community interest in top amateur soccer" for the team's demise. The team's attendance dropped significantly in their final season to a mere 20 paid tickets a game.

== Year-by-year ==
Year	Division	League	Reg. season	Playoffs	Open Cup
2006	4	NPSL	2nd, Northwest	Divisional Final	Did not qualify
2007	4	USL PDL	3rd, Southwest	Did not qualify	Did not qualify
2008	4	USL PDL	5th, Southwest	Did not qualify	Did not qualify

== Head coaches ==
- (Italy) Franco Benevento (2006)
- (United States) Peter Weiss (2007)
- (Chile) Jorge Espinoza (2008)
- (Peru) Aaron Castro (2008)

== Stadia ==
- PAL Stadium; San Jose, California (2006–2007)
- James Lick Memorial Stadium; San Jose, California (2008)

== Average attendances ==
- 2008: 194
- 2007: 194
