= California Gold =

American soccer team

- Full name: California Gold Football Club
- Nickname: The Gold
- Founded: 2002
- Dissolved: 2006
- Ground: Peter Johansen HS Stadium
- Capacity: ????
- Chairman: (Brazil) Luciano Silveira
- Manager: (Brazil) Luciano Silveira
- League: USL Premier Development League
- 2006: 9th, Southwest Division
Home colours	Away colours

California Gold was an American soccer team which began playing under the Gold moniker in 2002. The club was founded in 1997 as the Stanislaus County Cruisers. The team was a member of the United Soccer Leagues Premier Development League (PDL), the fourth tier of the American Soccer Pyramid, until 2006, when the team left the league and the franchise was terminated.

They team played its games at the stadium on the grounds of Peter Johansen High School in the city of Modesto, California. The team's colors were gold, red and white.

== Year-by-year ==
Year	Division	League	Reg. season	Playoffs	Open Cup
2002	3	USL D-3 Pro League	4th, Western	Did not qualify	Did not qualify
2003	3	USL Pro Select League	2nd, Western	Regional Finals	Did not qualify
2004	3	USL Pro Soccer League	3rd, Western	Did not qualify	Did not qualify
2005	4	USL PDL	7th, Southwest	Did not qualify	Did not qualify
2006	4	USL PDL	9th, Southwest	Did not qualify	Did not qualify

== Competition History ==
=== Stanislaus County Cruisers ===
Prior to 2002 the team was known as the Stanislaus United Cruisers, owned by a different management group, and playing in the USL Pro league. The Cruisers' first season was 1997, and their inaugural coach was Dave DeHart, who was fired after 14 games.

The Cruisers were generally successful, making a final in 1998 and averaging 1,568 fans and finishing third in league attendance in 1999, averaging crowds of over 2,000. They played matches at Central Catholic High School. Stanislaus hosted the San Jose Earthquakes in the U.S. Open Cup in 2000. The Cruisers lost the game 5-0.

=== USL D-3 Pro League/Pro Select League ===
California Gold entered the USL D-3 Pro League in 2002 after a rebrand of the Cruisers. They finished their first year in competition with a commendable 9–10–1, still fourth in the Western Conference behind divisional champs Utah Blitzz, but still with enough of a foundation on which to build. Jon Gordon was the top scorer in Gold's debut year, with 7 goals and 9 assists.

Gold had a decent season in the Pro Soccer League in 2003, finishing second in the Western Region behind Utah Blitzz. Despite starting the season with a four-game winless streak, they broke their duck with a 4–0 home win over Nevada Wonders featuring 2 goals from Martin Sims, and followed that up with four solid victories in May, including a 6–1 demolition of BYU Cougars on the road in Utah in which Sims hit another brace. Gold were generally reliable the entire year, and although they ended their regular season campaign with two defeats to Utah, the final stats were a comfortable 11–6–3 record, and into the post season. Unfortunately for Gold, they lost their regional final 1–0 to the Blitzz.

Gold had less success in 2004 due to injuries and player transfers. They won just two of their 20 games in the year – a 4–0 victory over BYU Cougars in mid-June off a hat trick from Gabriel Cuomo and a 3–2 win over Nevada Wonders in early July – The team scored just 18 goals all year. Gold ended the season with a four-game winless streak.

=== USL Premier Development League ===
Following their professional 2004 campaign, Gold found themselves in the fourth tier Premier Development League in 2005. The team had been sold to a new management group, but the new group could not replicate the success of the founding partners, and as a result gave up their fully professional status.

They won their opening game as an amateur side, 1–0 over rivals Bakersfield Brigade, and picked up another couple of wins in the early part of the season, 1–0 over both San Diego Gauchos and Fresno Fuego. However, Gold's form dipped in mid-June, and the defence became horribly leaky: they conceded 5 in their defeat to Nevada Wonders, four at home against Fresno, three against Orange County Blue Star, and conceded a heartbreaking 83rd-minute goal in their end-to-end 4–3 defeat to BYU Cougars. They finished the season with a 5-game winless streak, falling 4–1 on the road to Bakersfield on the last day of the season, and ended the year 7th in the Southwest, 31 points behind divisional champions Orange County Blue Star. Manuel Brasil and Bertin Loyola were Gold's top scorers, with 6 and 5 goals respectively, while Jonathan Domingos and Glenn Tafolla contributed 3 assists each.

Things went from bad to worse in 2006, where every possible thing that could go wrong on a soccer field went wrong for Gold. The 3–1 opening day loss to Orange County Blue Star was a sign of things to come; they suffered one of the worst campaigns in PDL history, losing every one of their 16 regular season games, scoring just 13 goals while conceding an astonishing 71. On nine separate occasions Gold conceded four or more goals in a game, and only once did they ever come close to accruing points, conceding an 84th-minute goal to San Fernando Valley Quakes in a close 2–1 defeat. Gold's form got worse and worse as the year progressed: they lost 5–1 to the San Fernando Valley Quakes on the road in mid-June, 6–0 at the San Diego Gauchos, 8–1 at home to the San Francisco Seals, and ended the year with a devastating 12–1 loss to Fresno Fuego – although, ironically, the Gold were 1–0 up after 56 seconds when Fresno scored an own goal! Aaron Billington and Uriel Robledo were Gold's nominal top scorers, with two goals each, Billington having played 7 games in goal and 6 games as a midfielder!

Following the conclusion of the 2006 season, in which they were by far the worst team in the PDL, the team withdrew from active competition.

== Notable former players ==
- (New Zealand) Jason Batty
- (United States) Kupono Low

== Coaches ==
- (Bosnia and Herzegovina) (United States) Haris Demidzic 2004

== Stadiums ==
- Stadium at Modesto Christian High School, Modesto, California 2003
- Stadium at Ripon High School, Ripon, California 2004
- Stadium at Peter Johansen High School, Modesto, California 2005–06
- Stadium at Hilmar High School, Hilmar, California 2005 (2 games)

== Average Attendance ==
=== California Gold ===
- 2006: 246
- 2005: 152
- 2004: 320
- 2003: 577
- 2002: 338

=== Stanislaus County ===
- 2001: 556
- 2000: 850
- 1999: 1,358
- 1998: 1,586
- 1997: 1,438

Source: Kenn.com
