= Nolz =

Nolz is a surname. Notable people with the surname include:

- Josh Nolz, former American midfielder
- Kaley Nolz, American politician

== See also ==
- Nolza
