= Paul Islas =

American soccer player

Personal information
- Date of birth: September 14, 1991 (age 35)
- Place of birth: Fresno, California, United States
- Height: 1.70 m (5 ft 7 in)
- Positions: Forward; winger

Team information
- Current team: Fresno Fuego
- Number: 11

Youth career
- 2009–2012: Fresno Pacific Sunbirds

Senior career*
Years	Team	Apps	(Gls)
2012–2013	Fresno Fuego	24	(16)
2013	Charlotte Eagles	11	(3)
2014–	Fresno Fuego	13	(4)

International career
2008	United States U18	2	(0)
- * Club domestic league appearances and goals as of June 18, 2014

Paul Islas (born September 14, 1991) is an American soccer player who played for Fresno Fuego in the USL Premier Development League.

== Career ==
=== College and amateur ===
Islas played college soccer at Fresno Pacific University between 2009 and 2012, where in his senior year he was NSCAA All-America Third Team.

During his time at college, Islas also played for USL PDL club Fresno Fuego in 2012.

=== Professional career ===
On January 17, 2013, Islas was selected 19th overall in the 2013 MLS Supplemental Draft by Chivas USA. Islas didn't secure a contract with the Major League Soccer team and returned to Fresno Fuego for their 2013 season.

Islas signed his first professional contract with USL Pro club Charlotte Eagles on July 2, 2013.
