= San Diego Gauchos =

- Full name: San Diego Gauchos
- Nickname: The Gauchos
- Founded: 2002
- Dissolved: 2006
- Stadium: Torero Stadium
- Capacity: 7,035
- Chairman: (United States) Obed Ferrari
- Manager: (United States) Bob Maruca
- League: USL Premier Development League
- 2006: 8th, Southwest Division
Home colours	Away colours

The San Diego Gauchos were an American soccer team based in San Diego, California, that competed in the United Soccer League's Premier Development League (PDL), the fourth tier of the American soccer pyramid. The team played its home games at Torero Stadium. In 2006, the team was sold to new owners, and the franchise was disbanded.

== Year-by-year ==
Year	Division	League	Reg. season	Playoffs	Open Cup
2002	3	USL D-3 Pro League	2nd, Western	Quarterfinals	2nd Round
2003	3	USL Pro Select League	3rd, Western	Did not qualify	Did not qualify
2004	3	USL Pro Soccer League	2nd, Western	Quarterfinals	2nd Round
2005	4	USL PDL	8th, Southwest	Did not qualify	Did not qualify
2006	4	USL PDL	8th, Southwest	Did not qualify	Did not qualify

== Competition history ==
=== USL D-3 Pro League/Pro Select League ===
Original San Diego Gauchos logo from 2002

San Diego joined the USL D-3 Pro League as an expansion franchise in 2002 and enjoyed a successful first year in competition, finishing the regular season with a 10–7–3 record, second in the Western Conference behind Utah Blitzz, and into the post season at the first attempt. The Gauchos also made a brief foray into the US Open Cup, beating USASA amateur side Mexico SC 2–0 in the first round before losing heavily to A-League mainstays Minnesota Thunder 6–1 in the second round. The Gauchos defeated the Arizona Sahuaros 3–0 in the first round of the playoffs, before falling 1–0 to Utah in the quarter finals. Nevertheless, it was a promising first season; future MLS star Herculez Gomez was the Gauchos' top scorer, with 17 goals, while goalkeeper Daniel Sirota posted a 1.36 GAA average.

Despite having finished 2002 on a high, 2003 was a difficult season for the Gauchos, who slumped to a 3–13–1 record, and finished dead last in the Western Conference. Their only wins came over California Gold, 3–2 on the opening day of the season; Nevada Wonders, a sluggish 1–0 home victory in June; and over Gold again, a 2–0 win in mid-July off goals from Kristofer Larsen and Akbar Zareh-Mendez. The majority of the rest of the season was a struggle; they lost often to non-conference opponents, and even found makeup games against lower-division teams trying. They lost 3–0 to Fresno Fuego at home in mid May, were hammered 4–0 by Utah Blitzz, received five of the best from Western Mass Pioneers on the road in June, and received a 5–1 shellacking from an Orange County Blue Star team that boasted Jürgen Klinsmann and future MLS star Robbie Rogers in their starting eleven.

The Gauchos rallied considerably in 2004, finishing the year in second place, with a much-improved 9–9–2 record, and into the post-season for the second time. They won their opening game of the season, 2–1 over BYU Cougars, and recorded an astonishing 3–2 victory over Orange County Blue Star in June, coming back from 2 goals down to take the win on a Herculez Gomez hat trick, despite both teams having been reduced to nine men by full-time! In the same vein, they also won a heart-stopping 3–2 classic against the Southern California Seahorses, with Herculez scoring in injury time. The Gauchos still occasionally found themselves on the receiving end of a large scoreline: they lost 5–2 to Fresno Fuego in their second regular season game, were battered 6–2 by Utah Blitzz at home in May, and surprisingly lost 5–1 to the Seahorses in the return fixture of their cross-league makeup series. The Gauchos also made their second trip to the US Open Cup this year, but unexpectedly lost to PDL side Boulder Rapids Reserve in the second round 5–4 on penalties after a 0–0 tie in regulation time. Herculez Gomez was by far the Gauchos best player, scoring 14 goals for the season.

Despite the better on-field performances, during the 2004 off-season the team's management made the decision to self-relegate themselves to the USL Premier Development League for 2005.

=== USL Premier Development League ===
The Gauchos had a torrid time in the PDL in 2005. They won just one game all season – a 3–0 victory over Nevada Wonders in July – and then had the ignominy of having points deducted by the league for fielding an ineligible player, meaning they finished the season dead last in the West with just 2 points, 12 points behind the next-worst team, California Gold. Some of the Gaucho's defeats were blowouts: they lost 4–0 to BYU Cougars in May, lost 6–2 at home to the all-conquering Orange County Blue Star in June, and dropped 3 on the road at the Southern California Seahorses. They were also involved in two consecutive 3–3 ties with California Gold and Bakersfield Brigade, the latter of which saw the Gauchos concede a demoralizing 87th-minute equalizer. Dustin Hammond was the Gauchos top scorer for the season, with 5 goals, while Oscar Espinoza contributed 2 assists.

2006 saw a general improvement in the Gauchos' play. They began the year disappointingly, with three straight heavy defeats, conceding five goals to Fresno Fuego on the opening day, and conceding another four when Fresno came down for the return fixture two weeks later. However, they enjoyed a brief run of form in late May and early July, rattling off two wins and a tie, including a satisfying 3–1 win over California Gold that included an Isaias Bardales hat trick. Gold were the Gauchos' whipping boys in 06, with the San Diego team winning 2–0 and 6–0 in their other encounters, the latter of which featured a Dustin Guerrero hat trick and a brace from Dagoberto Nogales-Gallegos. Unfortunately for the Gauchos, the run down the home stretch saw them suffer five straight defeats, including an astonishing 7–4 loss at home to the San Fernando Valley Quakes. The Gauchos finished the year 8th in the Southwest Division, 20 points behind divisional champions Southern California Seahorses. Dustin Guerrero was the Gauchos' top scorer, with 5 goals.

Following the conclusion of the 2007 season the Gauchos were sold to new owners, who decided to dispense with the men's soccer team, and concentrate their efforts on their USL W-League franchise, the San Diego Gauchos Women, which was to be re-branded as the San Diego Sunwaves.

== Coaches ==
- (United States) Bob Maruca, 2002–06

== Stadia ==
- Stadium at Southwest Senior High School, San Diego, California 2003
- Stadium at Southwestern College, Chula Vista, California 2004–05
- Balboa Stadium, San Diego, California 2004 (1 game)
- Stadium at Sweetwater High School, National City, California 2005
- Stadium at Torrey Pines High School, San Diego, California 2005 (1 game)
- Torero Stadium, San Diego, California 2006
- Stadium at Otay Ranch High School, Chula Vista, California 2006 (2 games)
- Stadium at Mar Vista Middle School, San Diego, California 2006 (1 game)

== Average attendance ==
- 2006: 465
- 2005: 315
