= David Franks =

David Franks may refer to:

- David Franks (aide-de-camp) (1740–1793), aide-de-camp for General Benedict Arnold during the American War of Independence
- David Franks (loyalist) (1720–1794), loyalist in the war of the American Revolution
- David Franks (hurler) (born 1979), Irish hurler

== See also ==
- David Frank (disambiguation)
