= Colin Clark (soccer) =

American soccer player (1984–2019)

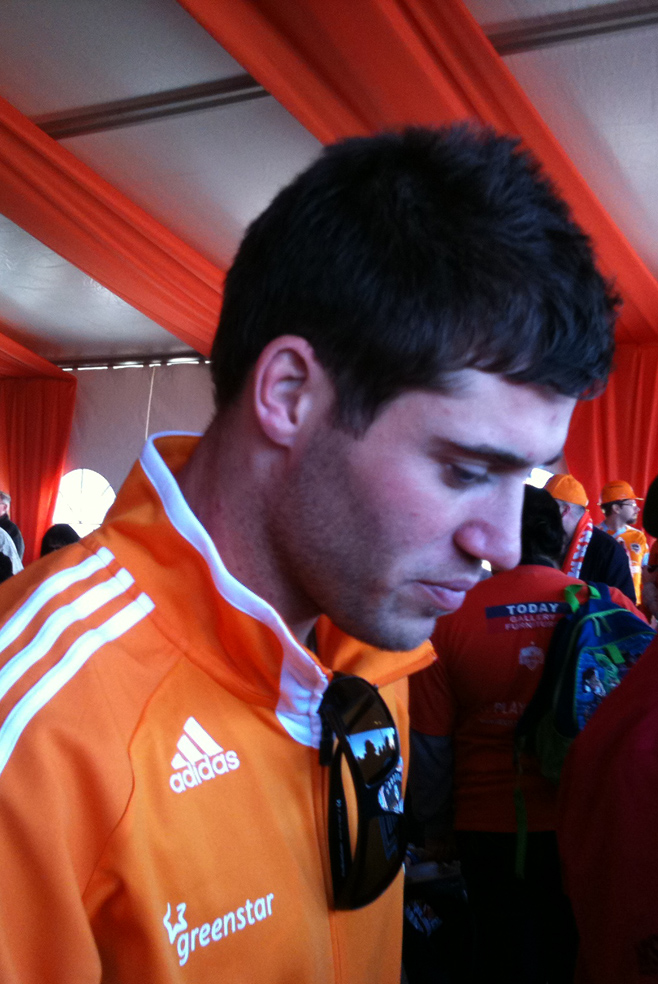
- Clark signing autographs at the groundbreaking ceremony

Personal information
- Full name: Colin Clark
- Date of birth: April 11, 1984
- Place of birth: Fort Collins, Colorado, U.S.
- Date of death: August 26, 2019 (aged 35)
- Height: 5 ft 11 in (1.80 m)
- Position: Left winger

Youth career
- 2002–2004: SMU Mustangs

Senior career*
Years	Team	Apps	(Gls)
2005	Boulder Rapids Reserve	12	(5)
2006–2010	Colorado Rapids	84	(10)
2010–2012	Houston Dynamo	43	(5)
2013	LA Galaxy	5	(0)
Total		144	(20)

International career
2009	United States	1	(0)
Medal record
Representing United States
Runner-up	CONCACAF Gold Cup	2009
Men's Soccer
- * Club domestic league appearances and goals

Colin Clark (April 11, 1984 – August 26, 2019) was an American soccer player who played as a left winger.

== Career ==
=== College and amateur ===
Clark played college soccer at Southern Methodist University for two years from 2002 to 2004, and in 2005 he played for the Boulder Rapids Reserve team in the USL Premier Development League.

=== Professional ===
==== Colorado Rapids ====
In February 2006 he officially signed a developmental contract with Colorado Rapids, and was with the team until 2010.

During training on August 11, 2009, Clark injured his ACL, causing him to miss the remainder of the 2009 campaign. One year later, during a match against San Jose Earthquakes, Clark tore the same ACL, which again forced him to miss the remainder of the season.

==== Houston Dynamo ====
On September 15, 2010, Clark was traded to Houston Dynamo with allocation money in exchange for Brian Mullan and a fourth-round pick in the 2013 MLS SuperDraft (later converted to a pick in the 2013 MLS Supplemental Draft.

==== League suspension ====
During a nationally televised game against Seattle Sounders FC on March 23, 2012, sideline microphones picked up Clark's voice as he uttered an anti-gay slur at a ball boy who delivered him a ball for a throw-in situation. He apologized for the incident on Twitter several hours later. On March 28, 2012, Major League Soccer suspended Clark for three games and fined him an undisclosed sum as punishment for the incident. League Commissioner Don Garber also ordered Clark to attend diversity and sensitivity training, stating, "Major League Soccer will not tolerate this type of behaviour from its players or staff at any time, under any circumstances," while also acknowledging that Clark had expressed "sincere remorse" for his actions. In response to the league's disciplinary action, Clark declared, "I am sorry about what happened during the Seattle match. I have personally apologized to the ball boy, and I want to take this chance to say I'm sorry to everyone that I've offended... what I said does not properly represent who I am or what I believe. I made a mistake that I truly regret. I accept the punishment that has been handed down by MLS."

==== Los Angeles Galaxy ====
When Clark's contract expired at the end of the 2012 season he chose to enter the 2012 MLS Re-Entry Draft. On December 14, 2012, he was selected by Los Angeles Galaxy in stage two of the draft. Los Angeles traded up in the draft order to select Clark, giving up a 2013 MLS Supplemental Draft pick and an international roster slot in the deal.

=== International ===
On July 11, 2009, Clark made his debut with the United States against Haiti in the 2009 CONCACAF Gold Cup.

== Death ==
On August 26, 2019, Clark died after suffering a heart attack; he was 35 years old.
