= Jorge Espinoza =

Chilean footballer (born 1953)

Personal information
- Date of birth: March 11, 1953 (age 73)
- Place of birth: Santiago, Chile
- Position: Midfielder

Senior career*
Years	Team	Apps	(Gls)
1972–1977	Colo Colo	35	(1)
1978	Universidad Católica	18	(1)
1979–1981	Chicago Sting	0	(0)
1981–1984	Memphis Americans (indoor)	102	(8)
1984–1985	Las Vegas Americans (indoor)	48	(8)
1985–1986	Wichita Wings (indoor)	31	(2)
1986–1987	Kansas City Comets (indoor)	47	(7)
1987	Toronto Italia		
1987–1988	Dallas Sidekicks (indoor)	41	(2)
1987	North York Rockets	7	(0)
1990–1991	Illinois Thunder (indoor)	34	(8)
1992	Milwaukee Wave (indoor)	16	(1)

Managerial career
- 1987: Palatine High School
- 1990–1992: Rosary College
- 1993: Triton College
- 1994: Rockford Raptors
- 1995: Mexico Toros
- 1996–1997: Indiana Twisters
- 1998–1999: San Jose Clash (assistant)
- 1999: San Jose Clash (interim)
- 2000–2001: New England Revolution (assistant)
- 2004–2005: Del Mar High School
- 2006: Gavilan College
- 2008: San Jose Frogs
- * Club domestic league appearances and goals

Jorge Espinoza (born March 11, 1953) is a Chilean retired professional soccer player who played in the Major Indoor Soccer League and National Professional Soccer League. He also coached at the high school, collegiate and professional levels including two games with the San Jose Clash of Major League Soccer in 1999.

== Playing career ==
From 1972 to 1976, Espinoza played for Colo Colo, and 1978 for Universidad Católica in Chile. In 1979, he moved to the United States and signed with the Chicago Sting of the North American Soccer League. Over three seasons with the Sting, Espinoza was hampered by knee injuries and did not crack the first team. In 1981, he moved to the Memphis Americans in the Major Indoor Soccer League. He spent three seasons in Memphis before moving with the team to Las Vegas in 1984. He then played the 1984–85 MISL season with the Las Vegas Americans. The team folded at the end of the season and the Pittsburgh Spirit moved to sign Espinoza. However, the Wichita Wings also claimed him. MISL commissioner Francis Dale awarded the rights to Espinoza to the Wings on September 26, 1985. In September 1986, the Wings sold Espinoza's contract to the Kansas City Comets. On June 4, 1987, the Comets released Espinoza. He then signed as a free agent with the Dallas Sidekicks on November 17, 1987. The Sidekicks released him at the end of the season. In the summer of 1987 he played in the National Soccer League with Toronto Italia. He then moved to Canada to sign with the North York Rockets of the Canadian Soccer League. He played two seasons with the Rockets, then returned to the United States in 1990 to join the Illinois Thunder of the National Professional Soccer League. He played one season with the Thunder, scoring eight goals. In January 1992, Espinoza signed with the Milwaukee Wave of the NPSL. The Wave released him at the end of the season.

== Coaching career ==
When the Kansas City Comets released Espinoza in the summer of 1987, he turned to coaching the Palatine High School boys soccer team while waiting for another team to sign him. On September 1, 1990, Rosary College hired Espinoza as head coach of the soccer team. In 1993, he moved to Triton College. In 1994, he coached the Rockford Raptors of the USISL. In 1995, he coached the Mexico Toros of the Continental Indoor Soccer League. He coached the team to a 17-11 record. In February 1996, the Indiana Twisters of the Continental Indoor Soccer League hired Espinoza as its head coach. Over two seasons, he took them to a 27-29 record. In 1998, the San Jose Clash hired Espinoza as an assistant coach. In 1999, the Clash fired Brian Quinn. Espinosa served as head coach for two games, both victories, before Lothar Osiander assumed the position of head coach. In 2004 and 2005, Espinoza served as the head coach of the Del Mar High School girls soccer team. In May 2006, Espinoza became the head coach of the Gavilan College women's soccer team. In December 2007, he was named the head coach of the San Jose Frogs.
