= Chad Smith (soccer) =

American soccer player

Personal information
- Full name: Chad Smith
- Date of birth: February 24, 1980 (age 46)
- Place of birth: Houston, Texas, United States
- Height: 5 ft 11 in (1.80 m)
- Position: Defender

College career
Years	Team	Apps	(Gls)
2003–2006	Midwestern State Mustangs		

Senior career*
Years	Team	Apps	(Gls)
2003	Texas Spurs		
2004	Okanagan Challenge		
2006	Virginia Beach Submariners	9	(1)
2007	FC Dallas	0	(0)
2007	Houston Dynamo	0	(0)
2008–2011	Charlotte Eagles	38	(0)
- * Club domestic league appearances and goals as of June 2, 2011

Chad Smith (born February 24, 1980) is an American soccer player.

== Career ==
=== College ===
Smith played college soccer at Midwestern State University from 2003 to 2006. During his college years he also played in the Pacific Coast Soccer League with Okanagan Challenge, and in the USL Premier Development League with the Texas Spurs and the Virginia Beach Submariners.

=== Professional ===
Undrafted out of college, Smith spent time playing for the reserve teams of FC Dallas and Houston Dynamo in 2007, featuring in several MLS Reserve Division games but never being called up to either team's senior squad. He signed with the Charlotte Eagles in the USL Second Division in 2008 and made his professional debut on April 19, 2008, in Charlotte's 2008 season opener against Bermuda Hogges.
