= Kevin Durr =

American soccer player

Personal information
- Date of birth: March 13, 1991 (age 35)
- Place of birth: Schweinfurt, Germany
- Height: 1.83 m (6 ft 0 in)
- Position: Midfielder

Youth career
- 2003–2005: Bayer Leverkusen
- 2005–2007: Bayern Munich
- 2007–2009: FC Garmisch-Partenkirchen

College career
Years	Team	Apps	(Gls)
2009–2012	Air Force Falcons		

Senior career*
Years	Team	Apps	(Gls)
2015–2016	Colorado Springs Switchbacks	17	(0)
- * Club domestic league appearances and goals as of October 1, 2016

Kevin Durr (born March 13, 1991) is an American soccer player.

== Career ==
=== Youth and college ===
Durr was part of the Bayer Leverkusen youth system as well as Bayern Munich and FC Garmisch-Partenkirchen before moving to the U.S. and spending his college career at the United States Air Force Academy. He made a total of 78 appearances for the Falcons and tallied 18 goals and 18 assists.

=== Professional ===
On January 22, 2013, Durr was selected 16th overall in the 2013 MLS Supplemental Draft by Seattle Sounders FC. However, he was cut from camp due to his Air Force commitment.

On March 26, 2015, Durr signed a professional contract with USL expansion side Colorado Springs Switchbacks FC. He made his professional debut for the club on April 4 in a 2–1 defeat to Oklahoma City Energy FC. Durr ended his first season with the Colorado Springs Switchbacks FC making 11 appearances.

On January 25, 2016, it was announced that Durr had resigned with the Colorado Springs Switchbacks FC for the 2016 USL Pro season.
