= PAL Stadium =

Stadium in San Jose, California

Police Athletic League Stadium
- PAL Stadium
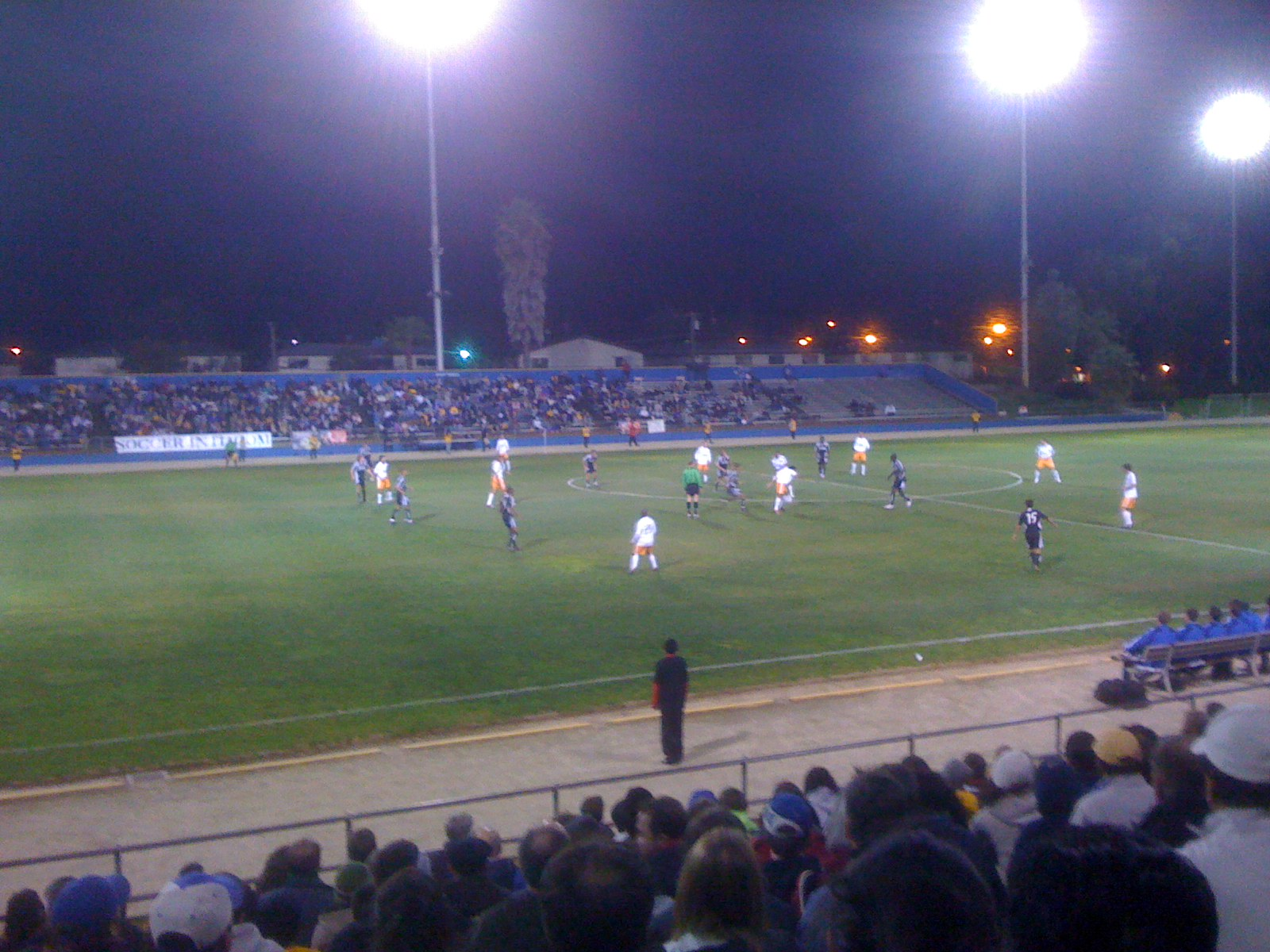
- Interactive map of Police Athletic League Stadium
- Location: 680 South 34th Street; San Jose, CA 95116
- Coordinates: 37.343516°N 121.848239°W
- Owner: San Jose Police Athletic League
- Capacity: 5,000

Tenants
- San Jose Frogs (NPSL) (2006–2007); Real San Jose (NSL) (2016–present)

Police Athletic League Stadium (PAL Stadium) is a stadium located in San Jose, California owned by the SJ division of the Police Athletic League, the stadium seats 5,000. It is home to Real San Jose of the National Soccer League.
