= Milton Blanco =

American soccer player

Personal information
- Full name: Milton Blanco
- Date of birth: April 27, 1984 (age 42)
- Place of birth: Fresno, California, U.S.
- Height: 1.85 m (6 ft 1 in)
- Position: Midfielder

College career
Years	Team	Apps	(Gls)
2004	Fresno Pacific Sunbirds		

Senior career*
Years	Team	Apps	(Gls)
2003–2004	Fresno Fuego		
2005	Chivas USA	5	(0)
2006	Puerto Rico Islanders	15	(9)
2007	Fresno Fuego	12	(6)
2008	Harrisburg City Islanders	17	(8)
2009	Austin Aztex U23	12	(6)
2010–2011	Fresno Fuego	30	(22)
2012	Charlotte Eagles	11	(0)
2012–2013	Atlanta Silverbacks	34	(1)
2014	FC Edmonton	9	(0)
2015	Orange County Blues	3	(0)
2016	Arizona United	15	(0)
2017	Fresno Fuego	13	(3)
2018–2019	Fresno FC	2	(0)
Total		178	(55)

Managerial career
- 2022–2023: Central Valley Fuego (assistant)
- * Club domestic league appearances and goals

Milton Blanco (born April 27, 1984) is an American former professional soccer player.

== Career ==
A veteran leader for the Fuego, Blanco has had professional stints with USL Second Division Harrisburg City Islanders as well as Chivas USA of MLS. Blanco is the 2nd Fuego player to receive this award joining former Fuego star Pablo Campos, the 2007 winner.

Blanco played college soccer at Fresno Pacific University.

== Personal ==
Blanco is of Salvadoran heritage, but born in the United States. He carries both a Mexico and USA passport.

His mother abandoned the home when Milton was a toddler and his father, Santos Antonio "Tony" Blanco, was shot and killed in Fresno in 1995.

== Honors ==
- 2011 North American USL PDL MVP
- 2011 PDL All-Star XI
- 2011 USL PDL All Western Conference Team
- 2011 USL PDL Scoring Champion (Goals/Assist)
- 2011 PDL Assist Champion
- 2011 Team MVP and Scoring Leader (Voted by Players)
