= Bakersfield Brigade =

- Full name: Bakersfield Brigade
- Nickname: The Legion
- Founded: 2005
- Dissolved: 2009
- Ground: Bakersfield Christian High School; Bakersfield, California
- Capacity: 4,422
- Owner: (United States) Jeff Thorn
- Head Coach: (United States) Jay Gore
- League: USL Premier Development League
- 2009: 10th, Southwest did not qualify for playoffs
Home colors	Away colors

Bakersfield Brigade was an American soccer team based in Bakersfield, California, United States. Founded in 2005, the team played in the USL Premier Development League (PDL), the fourth tier of the American Soccer Pyramid, until 2009, after which the franchise folded and the team left the league.

The team played its home games in the stadium on the campus of Bakersfield Christian High School. The team's colors were black and white.

The team also fielded a team in the USL’s Super-20 League, a league for players 17 to 20 years of age run under the United Soccer Leagues umbrella.

Former US national team star and Fox Soccer Channel broadcaster Eric Wynalda is a past member of the Brigade squad.

== History ==
The Brigade made their debut in PDL competition in 2005 under head coach Jay Gore, but lost their first competitive game 1–0 to the visiting California Gold. During their first season, Brigade were generally better on the road than they were at home, registering victories over San Diego, Nevada and Southern California Seahorses. Brigade missed out on qualifying for the post-season, finishing 5th in the division and ranked 32nd nationally, despite a comprehensive last-day victory over California Gold. Their season top scorer was CSU Bakersfield striker Lyle Martin, who notched up 5 goals.

2006 was a similar story. A strong season start saw the Brigade register victories over San Diego and Southern California Seahorses, but inconsistency at home in the mid-season again ended the team's playoff hopes fairly early, following five defeats in six games at their home at Bakersfield Christian High School. Brigade finished the season in 7th place; Lyle Martin again led the team's offense, registering 9 goals and 2 assists.

2007 saw a change in leadership and a change in goalkeeper – Jay Gore was replaced by 8-year MLS veteran Francisco Gomez as head coach, USMNT legend Eric Wynalda came on board as an advisor, and shot-stopper Kyle Reynish was drafted by Real Salt Lake; early season, the Brigade's new team seemed to be working, with season-opening victories over Fresno Fuego and Orange County Blue Star bringing them a first ever US Open Cup qualification. Sadly, Brigade's cup dreams ended with a first round 2–0 defeat to USL-1 side Portland Timbers. Similarly, a late-season collapse ended Brigade's playoff hopes quickly – the team suffered six defeats in seven games, including a 5–0 demolition away to Los Angeles Storm, despite Wynalda taking to the field himself for 24 minutes in the Storm return fixture. Brigade finished the season in 8th place; top scorer Santiago Aguilera Navarro scored an impressive 8 goals and 5 assists.

The 2008 pre-season was one of unprecedented anticipation, after it was announced that Eric Wynalda had signed to play the entire season for the Brigade; however, yet again, the on-field performances were disappointing for the men from Kern County. Five ties and just one win – 1–0 over Southern California Seahorses – in their first six games left the Brigade with a lot of ground to make up in the second half of the season. Back to back wins over Orange County Blue Star and Ventura County Fusion in mid-June kept their slim playoff chances alive, but four defeats in their last six games, including a 3–1 loss to struggling Orange County Blue Star, left Brigade seventh in the table, out of the playoffs for the fourth consecutive season, and eleven points behind eventual divisional champions, the San Fernando Valley Quakes. Quincy Amarikwa was top scorer, with four goals on the season; Eric Wynalda ultimately featured in just three games, clocking 159 minutes.

Things went from bad to worse for Bakersfield in 2009. Following a generally positive opening day 2–2 tie with Ventura County Fusion, the Brigade promptly lost their next six games on the bounce, allowing six goals against the Southern California Seahorses, four goals against eventual divisional champs Hollywood United Hitmen, and conceded a last minute goal in a 2–1 loss in the return fixture against Ventura. A 3–0 victory at home to Orange County Blue Star at the beginning of June was followed by a 2–0 win over their local rivals Fresno Fuego, and it looked as though a brief resurgence may have been on the cards, but Bakersfield failed to win another game all season, and were out of playoff contention before the end of the month. The pair losses to perennial whipping boys Lancaster Rattlers were hard to take for the men from Kern County; the 6–0 drubbing at the hands of their closest rivals, Ogden Outlaws, on the final day of the season was the final straw, and consigned Bakersfield to the basement for the first time in the team's PDL history. Adam Arteaga scored three of Bakersfield's 13 goals, but it's a backhanded compliment to be the top scorer of a team who found any kind silver lining difficult to find.

== Year-by-year ==
Year	Division	League	Regular season	Playoffs	Open Cup
2005	4	USL PDL	5th, Southwest	Did not qualify	Did not qualify
2006	4	USL PDL	7th, Southwest	Did not qualify	Did not qualify
2007	4	USL PDL	8th, Southwest	Did not qualify	1st Round
2008	4	USL PDL	7th, Southwest	Did not qualify	Did not qualify
2009	4	USL PDL	10th, Southwest	Did not qualify	Did not qualify

== Head coaches ==
- (United States) Jay Gore (2005–2006; 2009)
- (United States) Francisco Gomez (2007–2008)

== Stadia ==
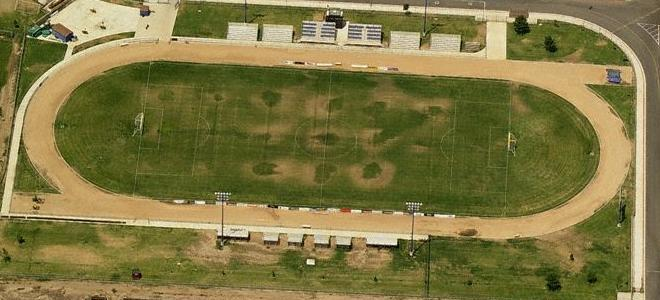
Brigade's current stadium at Bakersfield Christian High School

- Stadium at Bakersfield Christian High School; Bakersfield, California (2005–2009)

== Average attendance ==
Attendance stats are calculated by averaging each team's self-reported home attendances from the historical match archive at https://web.archive.org/web/20100105175057/http://www.uslsoccer.com/history/index_E.html.

- 2005: 434
- 2006: 697 (10th in PDL)
- 2007: 806 (7th in PDL)
- 2008: 884
- 2009: 324
