= David Frank =

David Frank may refer to:

- David Frank (media executive) (1958–2021), CEO of Dial Square 86
- David Frank (musician) (born 1952), American music producer, composer and pianist
- David Michael Frank (born 1948), American composer, music arranger, and conductor of film scores
- David W. Frank (1949–2017), American teacher and writer
- David Frank, a character played by Henry Ian Cusick in the film Frank vs. God

== See also ==
- David A. Frank-Kamenetskii (1910–1970), Soviet scientist
- - Jason David Frank, American actor and mixed martial artist
- David Franks (disambiguation)
