= San Fernando Valley Quakes =

Former American soccer team

- Full name: San Fernando Valley Quakes
- Nickname: The Quakes
- Founded: 2006
- Dissolved: 2008
- Ground: John Shepard Stadium; Woodland Hills, California
- Capacity: 5,500
- Owner: (United States) Mat Davis
- Head Coach: (Colombia) Juan Florez
- League: USL Premier Development League
- 2008: 1st, Southwest Division; Playoff Conference Semifinals
| Home colors | Away colors |

Original San Fernando Valley Quakes logo

San Fernando Valley Quakes was an American soccer team based in Calabasas, California, United States. Founded in 2006, the team played in the USL Premier Development League (PDL), the fourth tier of the American Soccer Pyramid, until 2008, when the franchise folded and the team left the league.

The team played its home games at John Shepard Stadium on the campus of Los Angeles Pierce College in nearby Woodland Hills, California. The team's colors were blue and black.

== History ==
The Quakes made their debut in PDL competition in 2006, one of several teams joining the Southwest division as it expanded to nine teams. Playing at John Elway Stadium on the campus of Granada Hills Charter High School, head coach Ali Khosroshahin's team made an inauspicious start, tying 1–1 with Los Angeles Storm in their opening game, and then suffering a devastating 4–3 home defeat to Orange County Blue Star, having led 3–0 with 8 minutes to go. The Quakes' mid-season form improved considerably, highlighted by several impressive victories, including a 5–1 thrashing of California Gold, and an astonishing 7–4 road victory over San Diego Gauchos which included a hat trick from central defender Derek Hanks. The Quakes were still in with a shout of making the playoffs as the final round of games came round, but a 1–0 defeat to the eventual divisional champions Southern California Seahorses put paid to their hopes, and they finished third in the table. Ryan Shaw was the Quakes' top scorer in their freshman year, scoring 8 goals in his 15 games, while Mat Davis and Adrian Lopez led the assists with 3 each.

2007 saw the Quakes begin the year with a new coach and a new partnership: Khosroshahin left to take charge of the women's soccer team at USC, and he was replaced by Colombian Juan Florez. In addition, the team signed a major partnership deal with Real SoCal, one of Southern California's major youth soccer organizations, which initiated a change in colors (from red and black to blue and black) and a re-design of the club badge. The 2007 Quakes were an improvement over their still-successful 2006 predecessors: they hammered Los Angeles Storm 5–0 on the opening day of the season, and despite losses to both Ventura County Fusion and Fresno Fuego on the road, managed to recover their form. A 2–1 victory over Lancaster Rattlers at the end of May began a 10-game undefeated streak which included a pair of 3–0 wins over Bakersfield Brigade and LA Storm. The Quakes were also undefeated at home the entire season, and by the end of the year, they were one of the four teams battling for the two playoff spots. A final day 3–1 victory over the Southern California Seahorses left them needing other results to go their way for them to make the playoffs for the first time; Ventura's inability to beat Storm inn their final game meant the Quakes finished second to Fresno Fuego on goal difference. However, their trip to Fresno for the playoffs was an unhappy one: they lost 2–0 to BYU Cougars in a semi-final game which saw them reduced to 10 men and in which Franklin suffered a broken arm. Once again Ryan Shaw was the Quakes leading marksman, netting 10 goals, while standout right winger Sean Franklin led the assist sheets with 7.

The Quakes had a slightly turbulent offseason, with Sean Franklin, Daniel Paladini and Mike Zaher all departing for Major League Soccer, and team relocating from Granada Hills to a new stadium in nearby Calabasas. Despite impressing during a pre-season friendly against Los Angeles Galaxy, losing 3–1 to a full-strength team which included David Beckham and Landon Donovan, the Quakes suffered their worst ever start to a competitive season, winning just one of their opening six fixtures, and receiving a 5–0 walloping at the hands of Los Angeles Legends. However, a dogged 4–2 victory at home to Lancaster Rattlers in early June signaled a turnaround in fortunes, and for the rest of the season the Quakes were unstoppable. The Quakes remained unbeaten for the rest of the regular season, notching up victories over San Francisco Seals, San Jose Frogs, Los Angeles Legends, Fresno Fuego and Ventura County Fusion, the last of which left the Quakes on the verge of their first ever divisional championship. The final game of the regular season was a winner-take-all matchup against Fresno Fuego, which the Quakes won 2–1 with goals by Devin Deldo and Sung-Hyun Kim, giving the team its first silverware in franchise history. The Quakes went to the playoffs in Fresno on a high, but were beaten in the semi-final by Northwest runners-up Vancouver Whitecaps Residency, after having a man sent off and conceding an injury time equalizer; Vancouver then added two more in extra time to secure a 3–1 victory, and send the Quakes home at the first hurdle for the second straight year. Devin Deldo was the team's top scorer, with 8 goals, while Sung-Hyun Kim contributed 5 assists.

The team officially announced its withdrawal from competition on April 17, 2009, citing the "current financial climate in the United States, low ticket sales income, and a general lack of adequate sponsorship and funding". The Quakes' franchise rights were then transferred to the Hollywood United Hitmen.

== Year-by-year ==
| Year | Division | League | Regular season | Playoffs | Open Cup |
|---|---|---|---|---|---|
| 2006 | 4 | USL PDL | 3rd, Southwest | Did not qualify | Did not qualify |
| 2007 | 4 | USL PDL | 2nd, Southwest | Conference Semifinals | Did not qualify |
| 2008 | 4 | USL PDL | 1st, Southwest | Conference Semifinals | Did not qualify |

== Honors ==
- USL PDL Southwest Division Champions 2008

== Head coaches ==
- (United States) Ali Khosroshahin (2006)
- (Colombia) Juan Florez (2007–2008)

== Stadia ==
The Quakes' home field, John Shepard Stadium

- John Elway Stadium at Granada Hills Charter High School, Granada Hills, California (2006–2007)
- John Shepard Stadium at Los Angeles Pierce College, Woodland Hills, California (2008)
- Keith Ritchie Field at Calabasas High School, Calabasas, California 5 games (2008)

== Average attendance ==
| Year | Attendance | Notes |
|---|---|---|
| 2006 | 303 | |
| 2007 | 267 | |
| 2008 | 218 | |
| All Time | 263 | |
