= Chris Whalley =

English soccer coach

Personal information
- Place of birth: Lincoln, England
- Position: Midfielder

College career
Years	Team	Apps	(Gls)
1999–2002	Mercyhurst Lakers		

Senior career*
Years	Team	Apps	(Gls)
2003	Reading Rage		
2005–08	West Virginia Chaos		

Managerial career
- 2003–04: Lees-McRae Bobcats (assistant)
- 2005–09: Lees-McRae Bobcats
- 2009: West Virginia Chaos
- 2010–11: Milwaukee Panthers
- 2012–13: Appalachian State Mountaineers (assistant)
- 2014–: Chowan Hawks
- 2018–: Lionsbridge FC
- * Club domestic league appearances and goals

Chris Whalley is the head coach of Lionsbridge FC of the USL League Two and the Chowan University men's soccer team. He is the former head coach of Lees-McRae College and University of Wisconsin-Milwaukee.

Whalley was named head coach of Lionsbridge FC on 14 February 2018.

Whalley has served as Lionsbridge FC head coach since the club formed in 2018. In his first four seasons at LBFC, Whalley has posted an overall record of 32 wins, 16 losses and 10 draws. Under Whalley's direction, Lionsbridge has turned TowneBank Stadium into a fortress, winning 75% of its home games and hosted the USL League Two playoffs in 2021, 2022, and 2023.

During the Whalley era, Lionsbridge FC has sent 14 players into professional football including two MLS draft picks, five different USL professional clubs as well as clubs in England, Spain, Scotland, Sweden, Luxembourg, Australia and New Zealand.

Whalley is also the head coach at Chowan University in North Carolina, where he is the school's all-time wins leader and one of the most successful coaches in the history of NCAA Division II.

In 11 seasons as a college head coach since 2005, Whalley has amassed a 127-68-25 record.

Under Whalley's direction, Lees-McRae won 74 percent of its games, including a 77-22-11 record. He led the team to three Carolinas Conference titles (2007, 2008, 2009), two tournament titles (2008, 2009), a number one national ranking (2009), and an NCAA national runner-up finish (2009) and Sweet 16 appearance (2007).

Whalley remains ranked 5th among NCAA Division II college coaches and 23rd among all college coaches in career winning percentage. He coached 14 All-Americans and 32 All-Region players during his tenure with the Bobcats.

On 2 February 2010, Whalley was announced as head coach at Wisconsin-Milwaukee. He took over a program that went 3-13-3 in the year prior to his appointment. Whalley's teams won six games in 2010 and again in 2011. One of those 2011 victories came against nationally ranked Northern Illinois in 2011, marking the first win over a ranked team since 2006.

Whalley returned to North Carolina in 2012 as an assistant coach at Appalachian State University and spent two seasons with the Mountaineers.

On 5 January 2014, Whalley was named head coach at Chowan. He inherited a program that went 1–14 in the year prior to his appointment. The team has since posted four consecutive winning seasons for the first time in school history. In 2014, his first season in Murfreesboro, Whalley led Chowan to a 12–8 record. In his second season, Chowan won the NCCAA South Region Championship. In 2017, the team posted a 67% winning percentage, the best mark in the Chowan history.

On 6 October 2016, the Chowan men's soccer team was announced as a recipients of the 2015-16 NSCAA Team Academic Awards. The team posted a team grade point average of 3.03.

Whalley previously served as head coach of the West Virginia Chaos of the Premier Development League in 2009.

Whalley lives in Suffolk, Va., with his wife, Alexis, and their sons, James and George.

== Playing career ==
Whalley played his college soccer at Mercyhurst College where he helped lead the Lakers to the NCAA Division II tournament and an NCAA Final Four appearance in 2002. He was part of two GLIAC championships in 2001 and 2002 and was named First Team All-GLIAC in those same seasons.

After his college days, Whalley also appeared for the Reading Rage (now Reading United AC) and starred as a player/assistant coach for the West Virginia Chaos from 2005 to 2008.
