= Josh Nolz =

American soccer player

Personal information
- Full name: Joshua Nolz
- Date of birth: April 13, 1980 (age 46)
- Place of birth: Onancock, Virginia, U.S.
- Height: 5 ft 10 in (1.78 m)
- Position: Midfielder

Youth career
- 1999–2002: Virginia Wesleyan College

Senior career*
Years	Team	Apps	(Gls)
2003–2006	Virginia Beach Mariners	16	(0)
2007–2008	Hampton Roads Piranhas	27	(7)

International career
- United States beach
- * Club domestic league appearances and goals

Joshua "Josh" Nolz (born April 13, 1980) is an American former midfielder. He was a member of the United States national beach soccer team at the 2007 FIFA Beach Soccer World Cup.

== Club ==
Nolz graduated from Nandua High School. He attended Virginia Wesleyan College where he played on the men's soccer team from 1999 to 2002. In 2003, he signed with the Mariners, but did not make a first team appearance until 2005. That year, he played sixteen league games. In 2006, he continued with the Mariners, but never entered a game. In 2007, Nolz moved to the Hampton Roads Piranhas where he played until 2008.

== International ==
In 2007, Nolz played for the United States national beach soccer team at the 2007 FIFA Beach Soccer World Cup. He continued playing for the national team through 2009.
