= West Virginia United =

American soccer team in Charleston

- Full name: West Virginia United
- Founded: 2003; 23 years ago
- Stadium: Trace Fork Soccer Complex; South Charleston, West Virginia
- Owner: Joe Johns
- Head Coach: Harry Robinson
- League: USL League Two; Valley Division
- 2025: Division: 3rd place Playoffs: DNQ
- Website: wvutd.com
Home colors

West Virginia United (formerly West Virginia Chaos and West Virginia Alliance FC) is an American soccer team based in Charleston, West Virginia. Founded in 2003, the team plays in USL League Two, the fourth tier of the American Soccer Pyramid.

== History ==
The West Virginia Chaos joined the PDL in 2003, but suffered a disappointing first season, ending in 6th and last place in the Mid-Atlantic Division with a 2–14–1 record; their only wins came over Greenville Lions in May, 1–0 off a goal by Stuart Bracher, and over the Columbus Shooting Stars in June, 3–2 with goals by Thomas Whittaker, Benjamini Chavolla and Hans Schubert.

2004 saw an improvement in form, with four wins on the season, but the team still finished last in their division, behind Chesapeake Dragons on goal difference, and 21 points behind league leaders Carolina Dynamo. The Chaos actually started the season on a positive note, winning three of their first four games (3–1 over Chesapeake Dragons, 4–0 over Raleigh CASL Elite and 1–0 over Williamsburg Legacy), and played out an astonishing 10-goal game against Carolina Dynamo in which Chaos's Shaun Oliveira scored a hat-trick but still ended up on the losing side. However, the Chaos suffered a dramatic downturn in form as the season progressed, suffering a 6–1 thrashing by Chesapeake Dragons, and three consecutive 4–0 losses to Raleigh, Williamsburg and Richmond Kickers Future.

2005 was much of the same; a disappointing series of high-scoring losses peppered with one or two impressive wins left them Chaos fifth of six in the mid-Atlantic, with 5 victories on the board, but a much too leaky defense. The highlight of the year was a dramatic come-from-behind 4–3 victory over Richmond Kickers Future on the final day of the season, with the winning goal being scored by striker Stanton Smith. Unfortunately, too many losses kept Chaos from progressing much further – Carolina Dynamo beat them 4–0 in mid-May, Augusta FireBall put six past them in mid-June, and Williamsburg Legacy out-shot them 5–2 at the end of June. Stanton Smith was the Chaos's top scorer, with 4 goals for the season, while Shaun Oliveira contributed 5 assists.

There wasn't much of a change in Chaos's fortunes in 2006, as for the fourth consecutive year they finished outside the playoffs – although the team did pick up six wins, their highest annual victory tally to date. Despite failing to put together a winning streak at any time in the year, Chaos did enjoy some encouraging results: they hammered Northern Virginia Royals on the road in early June off a brace by David Lilly and, most impressively, beat divisional champions Virginia Beach Submariners 3–2 on the final day of the season, with two goals by Karim Boukhemis. Unfortunately, Chaos continued to be weak at the back, with Raleigh Elite, Atlanta Silverbacks U23's and Virginia Beach Submariners all putting four or more goals past them.

However, as encouraging as 2006 was, 2007 was – at the time – the worst season in Chaos's history. They picked up just three wins all year and finished dead last of the 9-team Mid Atlantic Division, 34 points behind champions Hampton Roads Piranhas. The single bright spot of an otherwise dismal season was the 3–1 victory over Northern Virginia Royals at the end of May; elsewhere, however, Chaos suffered defeat after defeat, and having to endure a 7-game winless streak until the final game of the season, when they bested new boys Fredericksburg Gunners 3–2. Chris Whalley, Stanton Smith and Chad Duernberger were the Chaos's top scorers, netting 13 of their 20 goals between them.

Chaos's poor form continued on into 2008, despite transferring from the Eastern Conference Mid Atlantic Division to the Central Conference Great Lakes Division, and despite hiring a young, talented head coach in the shape of Englishman Luke Ibbetson. Chaos endured a demoralizing 14-game winless streak from the beginning of the season through to mid-July, during which they picked up just 5 points from five tied games. They lost 3–0 to eventual division champs Michigan Bucks, were overpowered 5–0 by Cleveland Internationals, and suffered another 5–0 defeat, this time to Indiana Invaders at the end of June. They even managed to let winning positions slip, conceding two late goals in their tie with Chicago Fire Premier; their single victory came in the penultimate game of the season when – out of the blue – they annihilated Fort Wayne Fever 5–0 in front of a set of home fans who had waited three months for a victory. Ultimately, however, Chaos finished the season rooted to the bottom of the division, a full 31 points behind Michigan, and the overall fifth-worst team in the country. That the three players tied at the top of the goalscorers list – Matthew Clare, Luke Ibbetson and Avneet Shergill – scored just two goals, each correctly highlighted the team's main problem.

2017 signals change for the Chaos. Having made the transition to the Great Lakes Conference in the Central Division of the PDL, the Chaos look to build a culture of success and professionalism within the club, led by former player and new head coach, Luke Duffy.

In 2018, the Chaos organization combined with the youth teams of Charleston FC in Charleston, WV, and Fury Soccer Club in Morgantown, WV to form the West Virginia Alliance.

Charleston FC was rebranded as FC Alliance South, whereas Fury Soccer Club will become FC Alliance North. The Chaos will operate under the same branding for the remainder of the 2018 PDL season, then become the West Virginia Alliance.

In 2021, they renamed as West Virginia United. Under new leadership, their form improved drastically, finishing 3rd in the South Atlantic division and qualifying for the playoffs for just the second time, (their first since 2014).

== Players ==
=== Notable former players ===
This list of notable former players comprises players who went on to play professional soccer after playing for the team in the Premier Development League or those who previously played professionally before joining the team.

- (United States) Sterling Flunder
- (United States) Chase Harrison
- (United States) Kolby LaCrone
- (Scotland) David Lilly
- (England) Paul Nicholson
- (United States) Nick Noble
- (England) Rob Vincent
- (Ghana) Illal Osumanu
- (England) Jamil Roberts

== Year-by-year ==
Year	Division	League	Regular season	Playoffs	Open Cup
West Virginia Chaos
2003	4	USL PDL	5th, Mid Atlantic	did not qualify	did not qualify
2004	4	USL PDL	6th, Mid Atlantic	did not qualify	did not qualify
2005	4	USL PDL	5th, Mid Atlantic	did not qualify	did not qualify
2006	4	USL PDL	3rd, Mid Atlantic	did not qualify	did not qualify
2007	4	USL PDL	9th, Mid Atlantic	did not qualify	did not qualify
2008	4	USL PDL	5th, Great Lakes	did not qualify	did not qualify
2009	4	USL PDL	5th, Mid Atlantic	did not qualify	did not qualify
2010	4	USL PDL	7th, Mid Atlantic	did not qualify	did not qualify
2011	4	USL PDL	4th, South Atlantic	did not qualify	did not qualify
2012	4	USL PDL	3rd, South Atlantic	did not qualify	did not qualify
2013	4	USL PDL	4th, South Atlantic	did not qualify	did not qualify
2014	4	USL PDL	1st, South Atlantic	Conference Finals	did not qualify
2015	4	USL PDL	5th, South Atlantic	did not qualify	2nd Round
2016	4	USL PDL	7th, South Atlantic	did not qualify	did not qualify
2017	4	USL PDL	3rd, Great Lakes	did not qualify	did not qualify
West Virginia Alliance FC
2018	4	USL PDL	5th, Great Lakes	did not qualify	did not qualify
2019	4	USL League Two	5th, Great Lakes	did not qualify	did not qualify
2020	4	USL League Two	Season cancelled due to COVID-19 pandemic		
West Virginia United
2021	4	USL League Two	3rd, South Atlantic	Conference Quarterfinals	did not qualify
2022	4	USL League Two	2nd, South Atlantic	Conference Semifinals	did not qualify
2023	4	USL League Two	4th, South Atlantic	did not qualify	did not qualify
2024	4	USL League Two	5th, South Atlantic	did not qualify	did not qualify
2025	4	USL League Two	3rd, South Atlantic	did not qualify	did not qualify
2025	4	USL League Two	1st, Valley	Conference Quarterfinals	did not qualify

== Honors ==
- USL PDL South Atlantic Division Champions 2014

== Head coaches ==
- (United States) Marty Martinez (2005–2007)
- (England) Luke Ibbetson (2008)
- (England) Chris Whalley (2009)
- (England) Adam Mitchell (2010–2014)
- (United States) Richard Wall (2016)
- (England) Luke Duffy (2017)
- (France) Romain Folz (2018)
- (England) Daniel Smee (2019–)

== Stadia ==
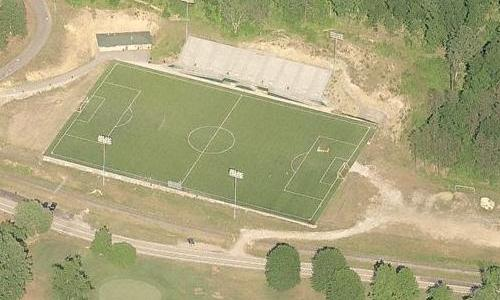
Schoenbaum Stadium, WVU home venue

- Stadium at Marshall University; Huntington, West Virginia (2003)
- Schoenbaum Stadium; Charleston, West Virginia (2004–present)
- Beckley Soccer Complex; Beckley, West Virginia 1 game (2006)

=== Average attendance ===
Attendance stats are calculated by averaging each team's self-reported home attendances from the historical match archive at http://www.uslsoccer.com/history/index_E.html and from Kenn.com https://kenn.com/blog/soccer/all-time-usl-league-two-attendance/.

West Virginia Chaos

- 2003: 315 (26th in PDL)
- 2004: 304 (29th in PDL)
- 2005: 372 (23rd in PDL)
- 2006: 279 (33rd in PDL)
- 2007: 341 (29th in PDL)
- 2008: 303 (38th in PDL)
- 2009: 179 or 175 (54th in PDL)
- 2010: 157 or 143 (52nd in PDL)
- 2011: 190 (44th in PDL)
- 2012: 134 (54th in PDL)
- 2013: 138 (50th in PDL)
- 2014: 138 (49th in PDL)
- 2015: 115 (50th in PDL)
