= Michael Holody =

American soccer player

Personal information
- Full name: Michael Holody
- Date of birth: March 30, 1987 (age 39)
- Place of birth: Clarkston, Michigan, U.S.
- Height: 6 ft 3 in (1.91 m)
- Position: Defender

College career
Years	Team	Apps	(Gls)
2005–2008	Michigan Wolverines	75	(9)

Senior career*
Years	Team	Apps	(Gls)
2006–2008	Michigan Bucks	47	(4)
2009–2011	Colorado Rapids	4	(1)
2009	→ Real Maryland (loan)	9	(0)
- * Club domestic league appearances and goals as of 15 September 2010

Michael Holody (born March 30, 1987) is an American retired soccer player.

== Career ==
=== College and amateur ===
Holody attended University of Michigan, where he made 75 appearance for the men's soccer team, the Michigan Wolverines. During his college career, Holody played with USL Premier Development League side Michigan Bucks between 2006 and 2008. Holody's time with the Bucks was very successful as he helped the side to the 2006 PDL North American championship before captaining the team back to a finals appearance in 2007 and the PDL Regular Season title in 2008.

=== Professional ===
Holody was drafted in the fourth round, 59th overall, of the 2009 MLS SuperDraft by Colorado Rapids. He was sent on loan to USL-2 side Real Maryland Monarchs in July 2009, making his debut for them against Crystal Palace Baltimore.

He made his MLS debut on September 5, 2009, appearing as a substitute against Toronto FC. He scored his debut goal a week later on September 12, 2009, in another substitute appearance against Toronto. Holody was waived by Colorado on September 15, 2010.

Holody was re-signed by Colorado on March 1, 2011. At season's end, the club declined his 2012 contract option and he entered the 2011 MLS Re-Entry Draft. Holody was not selected in the draft and became a free agent.

== Honors ==
=== Michigan Bucks ===
- USL Premier Development League Champions (1): 2006
