= Stephen Danbusky =

American soccer player (born 1977)

Personal information
- Full name: Stephen Danbusky
- Date of birth: April 18, 1977 (age 49)
- Place of birth: New Hyde Park, New York, United States
- Height: 5 ft 11 in (1.80 m)
- Position: Defender

Team information
- Current team: Hampton Roads Piranhas
- Number: 21

Youth career
- 1995–1998: Williams Ephs

Senior career*
| Years | Team | Apps | (Gls) |
| 1999–2001 | Long Island Rough Riders | 45 | (2) |
| 2001 | → New England Revolution (loan) | 0 | (0) |
| 2002 | Connecticut Wolves | 19 | (0) |
| 2003–2006 | Virginia Beach Mariners | 76 | (0) |
| 2007– | Hampton Roads Piranhas | 32 | (0) |

Managerial career
- 2002: Western New England College (assistant)
- * Club domestic league appearances and goals as of 4 June 2009

Stephen Danbusky (born April 18, 1977) is an American soccer player who played for Hampton Roads Piranhas in the USL Premier Development League.

== Career ==
=== College ===
Danbusky attended Williams College, where he played on the school's NCAA Division III soccer team from 1995 to 1998. Danbusky and his teammates were the NCAA Division III Soccer Champions in 1995, and in 1998 he was a first team All American. He graduated in 1999 with a B.A. in psychology.

=== Professional ===
Danbusky signed with the Long Island Rough Riders of the USL A-League in 1999, and played with the team for the next three years. In 2001, he was called up to the New England Revolution, but did not enter a game. In 2002, he moved to the Connecticut Wolves, where he was named the USL Second Division Defender of the Year. The Wolves folded at the end of the season and Danbusky moved to the Virginia Beach Mariners of the USL First Division.

After the Mariners folded at the end of the 2006 season Danbusky announced his retirement, but came back to sign with the Hampton Roads Piranhas in the USL Premier Development League in 2007.

== Coaching ==
In 2002, Danbusky became an assistant coach with Western New England University. He had also served as a volunteer assistant coach with Adelphi University.
