= Cristian Drăgoi =

Romanian footballer

Personal information
- Full name: Cristian Daniel Drăgoi
- Date of birth: April 17, 1982 (age 44)
- Place of birth: Bucharest, Romania
- Position: Midfielder

Youth career
- 2005–2007: St. John's University

Senior career*
Years	Team	Apps	(Gls)
2002–2003	Poli Iasi		
2007	Brooklyn Knights	11	(3)
2007–2008	Varese Calcio S.S.D.	6	(0)
2011–2012	KS Kastrioti	16	(2)
2011–2013	→ Windsor Stars (loan)		
2012–2013	KF Vllaznia Shkodër	19	(5)
2013–2014	FK Kukësi	7	(0)
2014	RWB Adria		
2014	Windsor Stars		(6)
2015	London City		
2015–2016	Detroit City FC	1	(0)
2016–	Oakland County FC	1	(0)
- * Club domestic league appearances and goals

Cristian Daniel "Danny" Drăgoi (born April 1982) is a Romanian footballer playing with Oakland County FC in the National Premier Soccer League.

== Playing career ==
Dragoi began his career in 2002 with Poli Iasi in the Divizia B, where he won promotion to the Divizia A. In 2005, he went overseas to America to play college soccer at St. John's University. After graduating from St.. John's he played with the Brooklyn Knights in the USL Premier Development League. At the conclusion of the PDL season he returned to Europe to play in the Serie C with Varese Calcio S.S.D. in 2007/2008. In 2011, he signed with KS Kastrioti in the Albanian Superliga. Throughout his time in Albania he also played with KF Vllaznia Shkodër, and FK Kukësi. During the Albanian offseason he played abroad in Canada with the Windsor Stars, and London City in the Canadian Soccer League. In 2014, he returned to American once more to play with RWB Adria in the Premier League of America, and the following season he played in the National Premier Soccer League with Detroit City FC, and Oakland County FC.
