= Virginia Beach Piranhas =

- Full name: Virginia Beach Piranhas
- Nickname: The Piranhas
- Founded: 2006 (as Virginia Beach Submariners)
- Dissolved: 2014
- Ground: Virginia Beach Sportsplex; Virginia Beach, Virginia
- Capacity: 6,000
- Owner: Marcie Lauman
- Head Coach: Matt Busch
- League: USL Premier Development League
- 2013: 2nd, South Atlantic; Playoffs: Divisional Playoffs
- Website: http://www.hrpiranhas.com
Home colors	Away colors

Original Virginia Beach Submariners logo

The Virginia Beach Piranhas were an amateur American soccer team based in Virginia Beach, Virginia, United States. Founded in 2006 as the Virginia Beach Submariners as part of the development system of the now-defunct USL First Division franchise, the Virginia Beach Mariners, the team played in the USL Premier Development League (PDL), the fourth tier of the American Soccer Pyramid, in the South Atlantic Division of the Eastern Conference. From 2007 to 2010 the team was known as the Hampton Roads Piranhas.

The team played its home games at Virginia Beach Sportsplex, which served as their home field starting in 2006. The team's colors are red, white and black.

The team had a sister organization, the Hampton Roads Piranhas Women, that played in the women's USL W-League, and also fields a team in the USL’s Super-20 League, a league for players 17 to 20 years of age run under the United Soccer Leagues umbrella.

The team announced on January 15, 2014, that both the PDL and W-League teams would fold and not play in the 2014 season. The primary owners health was cited as the reason behind the decision.

== History ==
The Virginia Beach Submariners entered the PDL in 2006 as the new development arm of the Virginia Beach Mariners USL First Division franchise. The Submariners were hot from the get-go; the team rattled off four straight wins in their first four competitive games, highlighted by a dominant 3–0 win over Ocean City Barons in their home debut. The Submariners' excellent early form also took them to the US Open Cup for the first time, but they lost first time out, 3–1 to USL Second Division side Wilmington Hammerheads. June was almost as good as May, winning four of their five games, and putting six goals past Northern Virginia Royals off goals by Edson Elcock and Daniel Haywood, but towards the end of the year the team stuttered a little, crawling over the finish line off the back of a 3–2 final day loss to West Virginia Chaos, and having lost two of their previous four games. Despite this, the Submariners still finished top of the Mid Atlantic Division, three points ahead of second place Williamsburg Legacy, and into the playoffs at the first attempt. Their late season poor form continued into the post season, as they were beaten 3–1 by the Westchester Flames in the conference semi-finals. Caetano Lima, Daniel Haywood and Edson Elcock all posted impressive scoring tallies, netting 19 times between them, while Jared Kent registered 7 assists.

On March 30, 2007, it was announced that the Virginia Beach Mariners, the parent club of the Submariners, had folded due to lack of local ownership; at the time, the fate of the Submariners remained unclear. One week later, on April 6, 2007, the Hampton Roads Piranhas W-League club took control of the Submariners, and renamed them to reflect the new ownership.

The newly named Piranhas were magnificent in 2007. The team was unbeaten the entire season, winning 14 of their 16 games, and finishing the year with the overall best regular season record in the country. The Piranhas utterly dominated their opponents; they did not concede a goal until 11th game of the season, a 1–1 tie with Reading Rage, and only let in 7 goals all season, with goalkeeper Evan Newton having the best stats of any shot-stopper in the year. In front of goal the Piranhas were no less potent, beating Northern Virginia Royals 4–0 in May, putting 5 goals past them in the return fixture in June, and destroying Delaware Dynasty 7–1 on the road in July, when Aaron Wheeler and Zach Kinney both scored hat tricks. A strong run through the playoffs seemed inevitable, but the Piranhas were shockingly beaten on penalties by Brooklyn Knights after a 1–1 tie in the conference semi-final. Andrew Wheeler was the club's top scorer, with 14 goals.

Hampton Roads Piranhas logo

After being virtually unbeatable in 2007, the Piranhas slumped in 2008; their unbeaten home record was taken in the first game of the new season following their shock 1–0 loss to Northern Virginia Royals, and they lost their second home game 2–0 to the Fredericksburg Gunners before finally notching up their first win, 3–0 over New Jersey Rangers at the end of May. Inconsistency plagued the Piranhas, who would win one, then lose one, then win one, then lose one, all year long. The high points were the victories over Richmond Kickers Future in the James River Cup – 3–1 away and 2–0 at home – whereas the low points included a disappointing 1–0 loss to bottom-of-the-table New Jersey Rangers in early June, and a 4–1 thrashing at the hands of Fredericksburg Gunners in the penultimate game of the season. Having defeated all-comers in 2007, the Piranhas finished 2008 a disappointing third in the Mid Atlantic Division, out of the playoffs; Tom Woolard was the team's top scorer, with 5 goals, while Daniel Haywood and Josh Nolz each contributed three assists.

== Players ==
=== Notable former players ===
This list of notable former players comprises players who went on to play professional soccer after playing for the team in the Premier Development League, or those who previously played professionally before joining the team.

- (United States) Kalin Rosales
- (United States) Corey Ashe
- (United States) Stephen Danbusky
- (United States) Edson Elcock
- (Denmark) Jakob Fenger-Larsen
- (United States) Bobby Foglesong
- (United States) John Gilkerson
- (Jamaica) Kevon Harris
- (United States) David Horst
- (Uganda) Henry Kalungi
- (Cameroon) Joseph Nane
- (United States) Evan Newton
- (United States) Chad Smith
- (United States) Tony Tchani
- (Cameroon) Yomby William
- (United States) Aaron Wheeler
- (Northern Ireland) Tennant McVea

== Year-by-year ==
Year	Division	League	Regular season	Playoffs	Open Cup
2006	4	USL PDL	1st, Mid Atlantic	Conference Semifinals	1st Round
2007	4	USL PDL	1st, Mid Atlantic	Conference Semifinals	Did not qualify
2008	4	USL PDL	3rd, Mid Atlantic	Did not qualify	Did not qualify
2009	4	USL PDL	4th, Mid Atlantic	Did not qualify	Did not qualify
2010	4	USL PDL	8th, Mid Atlantic	Did not qualify	Did not qualify
2011	4	USL PDL	5th, South Atlantic	Did not qualify	Did not qualify
2012	4	USL PDL	9th, South Atlantic	Did not qualify	Did not qualify
2013	4	USL PDL	2nd, South Atlantic	Divisional Playoffs	Did not qualify

== Honors ==
- USL PDL Regular Season Champions 2007
- USL PDL Mid Atlantic Division Champions 2007
- USL PDL Mid Atlantic Division Champions 2006

=== James River Cup ===
The James River Cup was an annual competition held between the Richmond Kickers and the Virginia Beach Mariners (formerly Hampton Roads Mariners) in which the team with the most points at the conclusion of all scheduled matches between the two teams. The Cup was held every year since 1996 with the exception of 1997 and 2001 when Virginia Beach did not field a team. In 2007, the Virginia Beach team was disbanded.

For the 2008 season, the James River Cup was contested between the Richmond Kickers organization and the Hampton Roads Piranhas organization. The cup went to the organization that had the most points in games between their PDL and W-League teams. The series ended up tied 2–2–1, with the Piranhas winning the Cup on goal difference.

Winners

Hampton Roads Piranhas 15th Anniversary commemorative logo

- 2008: Hampton Roads Piranhas
- 2007: Not Held
- 2006: Virginia Beach Mariners
- 2005: Richmond Kickers
- 2004: Richmond Kickers
- 2003: Richmond Kickers
- 2002: Richmond Kickers
- 2001: Not Held
- 2000: Richmond Kickers
- 1999: Richmond Kickers
- 1998: Richmond Kickers
- 1997: Not Held
- 1996: Hampton Roads Mariners

== Head coaches ==
- (United States) Jon Hall (2006–2009)
- (United States) Leroi Wilson (2010)
- (Brazil) Cesar Rizzo (2011–2012)

== Stadia ==
- Virginia Beach Sportsplex; Virginia Beach, Virginia (2006–2007, 2010–present)
- Foster Field; Norfolk, Virginia (2008–2009)

== Average attendance ==
Attendance stats are calculated by averaging each team's self-reported home attendances from the historical match archive at http://www.uslsoccer.com/history/index_E.htm and Kenn.com https://kenn.com/blog/soccer/all-time-usl-league-two-attendance/

- 2006: 411 or 221
- 2007: 441
- 2008: 482
- 2009: 411 or 347
- 2010: 441 or 423
- 2011: 463 or 449
- 2012: 558 or 336
- 2013: 554
