= Orange County Blue Star =

- Full name: Orange County Blue Star
- Nicknames: The OC, Blue Star
- Founded: 1997
- Dissolved: 2012
- Stadium: Eagle Stadium; Irvine, California
- Capacity: 100
- League: USL Premier Development League
- 2012: 7th, Southwest; Playoffs: DNQ
Home colors	Away colors

Original Orange County Zodiac logo

Orange County Blue Star was an amateur American soccer team based in Irvine, California. Founded in 1997, the team played in the USL Premier Development League (PDL), the fourth tier of the American Soccer Pyramid, in the Southwest Division of the Western Conference until 2012.

The team played its home games at Eagle Stadium on the campus of Concordia University, where they played from 2007 to 2012. The team's colors are white and black.

== History ==
=== Zodiac Professional era ===
Blue Star began life as Orange County Zodiac in the A-League in 1997, where they finished fifth in the Pacific Conference in their inaugural season, with Gustavo Leal as the team's top scorer. The team had three seasons of middling results, only advancing to the post season in 1999, where they lost to the Seattle Sounders in the Round of 16. The Zodiac played some of their games at Santa Ana Stadium. They changed their name to Orange County Waves prior to the 2000 season, their final one in the A-League, but finished rock bottom of the Pacific Conference, and took the 2000–01 offseason to consider their options.

=== Drop to PDL; Blue Star is born ===
The club dropped down to the PDL in 2001 and changed their name again, and the newly christened Blue Star immediately enjoyed success. They finished their first year in the fourth tier as Champions of the Southwest division, but were defeated by eventual championship runners-up, Calgary Storm, in the Conference semi-finals. 2002 was frustrating, with Blue Star finishing a third in the division and missing out on the playoffs, but 2003 was better, for although they finished second to Fresno Fuego in the divisional table, they advanced all the way to the national playoff semi-finals, falling 3–1 to Chicago Fire Reserves at the penultimate hurdle. The 2003 regular season included some stunning results, including a pair of 5–1 victories over Fresno Fuego and San Diego Gauchos, a 5–2 demolition of Nevada Wonders, and a breathtaking 5–4 win over BYU Cougars which featured a hat trick by Ryan Coiner.

The year 2003 was a landmark season due to the participation of a certain German player named Jay Göppingen, who played eight games and scored five goals for Blue Star. Goppingen was actually the pseudonym used by former Inter Milan, Bayern Munich and Tottenham Hotspur striker Jürgen Klinsmann who, following his relocation from Europe to California, decided he wanted to keep playing for a year or so, just for fun, and to impart his wisdom to Orange County's young soccer players. Klinsmann was born in the city of Göppingen in Baden-Württemberg.

The 2004 season saw Blue Star relocate from the stadium at UC Irvine to the Home Depot Center in Carson, but the change of surroundings didn't stop them from winning their second divisional title in style, finishing four points ahead of second-place Fresno Fuego, and losing just 3 regular season games all season. Blue Star enjoyed a number of free-scoring victories, putting five past Nevada Wonders in mid May, and topping rivals Southern California Seahorses 4–2 in June. The playoffs saw them take care of Spokane Shadow in the opening game, but eventually lose the Western Conference title to Fresno Fuego.

Blue Star enjoyed probably the most successful year in their history in 2005, retaining their division title with comparative ease by finishing a clear 11 points ahead of their nearest rivals, Southern California Seahorses. Once again, Blue Star were the league's free-scoring entertainers, scoring more than four goals on six occasions, including a 6–2 road victory over San Diego Gauchos, and two 5–0 demolitions of BYU Cougars and Nevada Wonders. The 2005 squad included a number of players who would later go on to grace Major League Soccer and the US Men's National Team, including Sacha Kljestan, Calen Carr, Robbie Rogers, Kamani Hill, and top scorer Kei Kamara from Sierra Leone, who knocked in 12 goals in his 14 starts. Blue Star easily advanced to the post-season playoffs where, after beating Fresno Fuego and Northwest champions Cascade Surge, they fell by the odd goal in three to the eventual national champions, Des Moines Menace. Blue Star's impressive early season form also took them to the US Open Cup for the first time since 1999, but they were beaten 3–1 in the first round by El Paso Patriots. Blue Star finished 2005 with the best regular season record in the country, winning 15 out of their 16 games, suffering just one loss, and finishing with a +39 goal difference.

Original Orange County Blue Star logo

With their conference expanding to 9 teams, Blue Star did not find life in 2006 quite as easy, but they still finished second in the division behind Southern California Seahorses. Playing out of yet another new stadium – Orange Coast College in Costa Mesa – Blue Star started the season strongly, winning four of their first five games, including an astonishing 4–3 victory over San Fernando Valley Quakes which saw them score 4 goals in the final 8 minutes of the game. A strong season finish saw Blue Star win six of their last eight games, and their form continued into the playoffs, where they overcame Abbotsford Rangers and BYU Cougars to take the Western Conference title for the second year in a row, before losing to Michigan Bucks in the national semi finals. Anthony Hamilton and Sal Zizzo were the season's top scorers with 8 and 4 goals respectively, while Sem Lopez contributed 3 assists.

The 2007 season, however, marked the first season when things did not go Blue Star's way. Playing out of their third stadium in as many years – Concordia University in Irvine – for the first time in a long time the team finished with a losing record, picking up just 3 wins all season, and finishing a lowly 9th in the divisional table, a full 19 points adrift of league leaders Fresno Fuego and San Fernando Valley Quakes. The sole high point in a hugely disappointing season was the 3–0 victory over Bakersfield Brigade in early July, and it is indicative of the unexpected slump in form the team suffered that the season's top scorer, Patrick Marion, notched just 5 of the team's 18 goals.

Blue Star started 2008 brightly, hoping to put the misery of the dismal 2007 season behind them. Two wins in their first four games – 4–1 over old rivals Southern California Seahorses (in which all four Blue Star goals were scored by Jeffrey Clark) and 3–1 over Lancaster Rattlers – initially kept spirits high, but things quickly turned sour. Blue Star didn't win another game until July, and during their mid-season drought suffered seven defeats in nine games, including a 6–1 hammering by Los Angeles Legends, a 3–0 home defeat by Fresno Fuego, and a humiliating 4–2 loss away to Lancaster Rattlers in what was that franchise's second ever victory. As July came round, Blue Star were rooted at the foot of the Southwest standings, but three victories in their last three games, including an impressive 3–1 win over Bakersfield Brigade, gave their year at least some small semblance of respectability. Nevertheless, Blue Star finished 8th of 10 in the division, twelve points behind divisional champions San Fernando Valley Quakes. Jeffrey Clark was the team's top scorer, with seven goals, while Tomer Konowiecki notched up four assists.

The 2009 season began superbly for Blue Star, with four wins in their first four games – including an impressive 4–0 over divisional new boys Ogden Outlaws that featured a hat trick from striker David Ponce – and four straight clean sheets for goalkeeper Kris Minton taking them to the first round of the US Open Cup for the first time since 2005. However, having gone unbeaten in their first six regular season games through the end of May, Blue Star collapsed in mid-season, and endured an awful ten game winless streak through June and July that saw the teams fall to a number of comprehensive defeats, losing 5–1 to Fresno Fuego, 3–0 to Bakersfield Brigade, and conceding a late equalizer in the return game against Fresno to draw 2–2 when victory looked to be on the cards. Even their cup run ended quickly with a 5–2 loss at the hands of NPSL side Sonoma County Sol. A final day 1–0 victory on the road in Utah against BYU Cougars restored a little bit of pride for the team which once dominated the division, but it was much too little too late, and they finished the year a distant eighth in the table. David Ponce scored five goals, but such was the squad's instability that head coach Spencer used 46 players during the course of the season, including ex-professional Mike Munoz and Ian Sarachan, son of former Chicago Fire MLS coach Dave Sarachan.

== Players ==
=== Current roster ===
As of August 10, 2012

Note: Flags indicate national team as defined under FIFA eligibility rules; some limited exceptions apply. Players may hold more than one non-FIFA nationality.

No.	Pos.	Nation	Player
0	GK	USA	Sam Chappell
1	GK	USA	Patrick McLain
2	FW	USA	David Ponce
3	DF	USA	Tyler Krumpe
4	DF	USA	Jimmy Turner
5	DF	USA	Joe Sofia
6	DF	USA	Patrick Matchett
8	MF	USA	Phil Da Silva
10	FW	USA	Ramiro Diaz
12	MF	USA	Neil Anaya
13	MF	USA	William Lopez
14	DF	USA	Charlie Pettys
15	MF	USA	Andy Riemer
16	DF	USA	Ryan Lee
18	MF	USA	Blake Wise
19	MF	USA	Michael Sahagian
20	DF	USA	Everett Pitts

No.	Pos.	Nation	Player
21	MF	USA	Christian Ramirez
22	DF	USA	Mitch Boland
23	DF	USA	Jon Spencer
24	DF	USA	Trevor Hubbard
25	MF	USA	Adrian Avila
26	MF	USA	Kovi Konowiecki
28	GK	USA	Kris Minton
29	FW	USA	Michael Shaddock
—	MF	USA	Steve Birnbaum
—	DF	USA	Ray Estrada
—	MF	USA	Jordan Gafa
—	MF	USA	Elijah Galbraith-Knapp
—	DF	USA	Wesley Lucas
—	MF	USA	Alec Sundly
—	DF	USA	Daniel Vigil
—	GK	USA	William Whiddon

=== Notable former players ===
This list of notable former players comprises players who went on to play professional soccer after playing for the team in the Premier Development League, or those who previously played professionally before joining the team.

- (United States) Calen Carr
- (United States) Conor Chinn
- (United States) Ryan Coiner
- (United States) Cameron Dunn
- (United States) Eric Ebert
- (United States) Michael Enfield
- (United States) Michael Erush
- (United States) Brad Evans
- (United States) Michael Farfan
- (United States) Irving Garcia
- (United States) Adolfo Gregorio
- (United States) Leonard Griffin
- (United States) Anthony Hamilton
- (United States) Jordan Harvey
- (United States) Nick Hatzke
- (United States) Kamani Hill
- (United States) Chandler Hoffman
- (Sierra Leone) Kei Kamara
- (United States) Amir Kazemi
- (United States) Dan Kennedy
- (Germany) Jürgen Klinsmann
- (United States) Gordon Kljestan
- (United States) Sacha Kljestan
- (United States) Mike Littman
- (New Zealand) Tony Lochhead
- (United States) Drew McAthy
- (United States) Noah Merl
- (Puerto Rico) Orlando Perez
- (Philippines) Charley Pettys
- (United States) Christian Ramirez
- (United States) Robbie Rogers
- (United States) David Sias
- (United States) A. J. Soares
- (United States) Matthew Andrade
- (United States) Joe Sofia
- (United States) Matt Taylor
- (United States) Nick Theslof
- (United States) Tyson Wahl
- (United States) Martin Vasquez
- (United States) Amani Walker
- (United States) Sal Zizzo
- (United States) Steve Patterson

== Year-by-year ==
Year	Division	League	Regular season	Playoffs	Open Cup
1997*	2	USISL A-League	5th, Pacific	did not qualify	did not qualify
1998*	2	USISL A-League	3rd, Pacific	did not qualify	3rd Round
1999*	2	USL A-League	4th, Pacific	Conference Quarterfinals	2nd Round
2000*	2	USL A-League	6th, Pacific	did not qualify	did not qualify
2001	4	USL PDL	1st, Southwest	Conference Semifinals	did not qualify
2002	4	USL PDL	3rd, Southwest	did not qualify	did not qualify
2003	4	USL PDL	2nd, Southwest	National Semifinals	did not qualify
2004	4	USL PDL	1st, Southwest	Conference Finals	did not qualify
2005	4	USL PDL	1st, Southwest	National Semifinals	1st Round
2006	4	USL PDL	2nd, Southwest	National Semifinals	did not qualify
2007	4	USL PDL	9th, Southwest	did not qualify	did not qualify
2008	4	USL PDL	8th, Southwest	did not qualify	did not qualify
2009	4	USL PDL	8th, Southwest	did not qualify	1st Round
2010	4	USL PDL	3rd, Southwest	did not qualify	did not qualify
2011	4	USL PDL	3rd, Southwest	did not qualify	did not qualify
2012	4	USL PDL	7th, Southwest	did not qualify	did not qualify

== Honors ==
- USL PDL Western Conference Champions 2006
- USL PDL Regular Season Champions 2005
- USL PDL Western Conference Champions 2005
- USL PDL Southwest Division Champions 2005
- USL PDL Southwest Division Champions 2004
- USL PDL Western Conference Champions 2003
- USL PDL Southwest Division Champions 2001

== Head coaches ==
- (United States) Erik Kirsch (2001)
- (United States) Tom Poltl (2002–2004)
- (United States) Nick Theslof (2005–2006)
- (United States) Jon Spencer (2007–present)

== Stadium ==
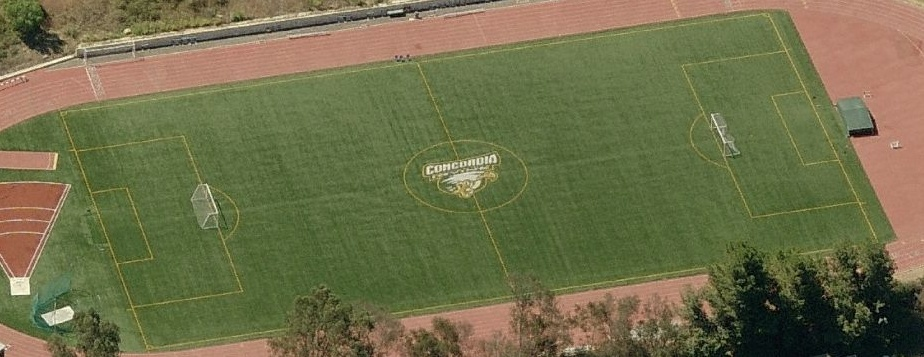
Blue Star's current stadium, Eagle Stadium on the campus of Concordia University

- Santa Ana Stadium; Santa Ana, California (2001–2002)
- Stadium at UC Irvine; Irvine, California (2003, 2005)
- Stadium at Sage Hill High School; Newport Coast, California, 2 games (2003)
- Home Depot Center; Carson, California (2004)
- Stadium at Orange Coast College; Costa Mesa, California (2006)
- Eagle Stadium at Concordia University; Irvine, California (2007–present)
- Stadium at Huntington Park High School; Huntington Park, California, 1 game (2011)

== Average attendance ==
Attendance stats are calculated by averaging each team's self-reported home attendances from the historical match archive at https://web.archive.org/web/20100105175057/http://www.uslsoccer.com/history/index_E.html.

- 2005: 109
- 2006: 95
- 2007: 314
- 2008: 79
- 2009: 114
- 2010: 93

== See also ==
Orange County FC
