= Fresno FC U-23 =

- Full name: Fresno Football Club U-23
- Nicknames: The Foxes; Los Zorros
- Founded: 2003; 22 years ago (as Fresno Fuego FC)
- League: USL League Two
- 2018: 5th, Southwest Division; Playoffs: DNQ
- Website: http://www.fresnofc.com/

Fresno Football Club U-23, formerly Fresno Fuego FC, was an American soccer team based in Fresno, California, United States. Founded in 2003, the team played in USL League Two, the fourth tier of the American Soccer Pyramid. The club drew an average home attendance of 3,951 in 2016, including league matches, divisional playoffs and exhibitions against professional clubs.

== History ==
Fresno Fuego FC made their debut in PDL competition in 2003, having picked up the franchise rights in 2002 by then partners Jaime Marquez Sr., J. Francisco Alvarez, J. Antonio Alvarez & Jaime Marquez Jr. from the former PDL champions, the Central Coast Roadrunners from San Luis Obispo. Playing on the campus of San Joaquin Memorial High School, Fresno made a blistering start to their first campaign, scoring eight goals in back-to-back wins over Nevada Wonders, California Gold and Orange County Blue Star, with standout striker Orlando Ramirez. Fresno's impressive early season form also saw them qualify for the US Open Cup, where they made it all the way to the fourth round with victories over Chico Rooks, Utah Blitzz and El Paso Patriots, before they finally fell, 3–1, to Los Angeles Galaxy. Fresno's home form was superb during their first season, losing just one game – a 3–2 turnaround to California Gold – the entire year. Fuego's Latin American connection, led by Ramirez and Fabricio Codeceira was influential and by the end of their debut year they were sitting proudly atop the Southwest table, ahead of Orange County Blue Star on goal difference. The playoffs were a disappointment; after defeating Northwest champions Spokane Shadow, Fresno fell to Blue Star in the conference final.

2004 saw the Fuego move to a new home at Fresno Pacific University, but the change did not affect their on-field performances, which included two 5–1 thrashings of the San Diego Gauchos, and nine-goal haul over 2 games against California Gold. Orlando Ramirez, Edgardo Contreras, Jose Luis Espindola and Milton Blanco continued their free-scoring exploits, and by the end of the 18-game season they finished just four points behind divisional champs Orange County Blue Star, and for the second year in a row made the playoffs. This time, however, Fuego took the conference title after wins over Cascade Surge and Blue Star. However, progress on the national stage eluded them, a 3–0 defeat to central conference champs Boulder Rapids Reserve ending their dreams of the PDL title. Nevertheless, two straight trips to the playoffs was impressive for a 2-year franchise.

Original Fresno Fuego logo

2005 saw expansion in the Southwest, and Fresno suffered a little. Despite opening strongly with 3 wins in their first 4 games, a mid-season slump saw them drop points against the Southern California Seahorses, California Gold and BYU Cougars. As a result, the gap between them and the divisional leaders – Blue Star and Seahorses – was too great, and despite winning 5 of their last 6 games – and scoring 15 goals in the process – they eventually finished third in the table. Veteran Edgardo Contreras and new signing Amaury Nunes were the top marksmen, knocking in 8 goals each, while Brazilian Fabricio Codeceira was a midfield dynamo, registering 7 assists for the season. Once again, Fresno's playoff campaign was a short one, falling to Orange County Blue Star in the first game.

2006 was more difficult still for Fuego. First of all, they found themselves without a permanent home stadium, and instead were forced to travel all over the city – to Golden West High School and Central High School amongst others – in search of a pitch on which to play. Secondly, even more expansion in the division raised the level of competition considerably. Fresno stuttered inconsistently through their opening games, beating San Diego Gauchos 5–2, then losing, 4–0, to Los Angeles Storm, thrashing San Diego, 4–0, then losing, 4–1, to the expansion San Francisco Seals. Fabricio Codeceira and Amaury Nunes remained potent in front of goal, netting 18 times between them, but their spotty form was their downfall, and by the end of the season head coach Jaime Ramirez's men were a distant fifth behind league leaders Orange County Blue Star and Southern California Seahorses.

2007 saw a huge change in fortunes for the Fuego. Before the season began the team signed a partnership with the AAA baseball franchise, the Fresno Grizzlies, resulting in cross-promotion, publicity, and a new home: Chukchansi Park in the heart of downtown Fresno. Buoyed by fan support which reached 3,000 spectators at home games, Fuego were resurgent: impressive early-season wins over the Southern California Seahorses and the San Fernando Valley Quakes kept them in the hunt for the playoffs, and their impressive home form meant that, by the end of the year, they were one of the four teams battling for the two playoff spots. A final-day 3–1 victory over the San Francisco Seals gave them the divisional title over the San Fernando Valley Quakes on goal difference; prolific Brazilian striker Pablo Campos scored two of his 18 goals, and cemented his position as the league-leading goalscorer. The playoffs, which were hosted by Fresno at Chukchansi, saw them demolish Tacoma Tide, 4–1, and then knock off Northwest champs BYU Cougars to take their second conference title; but once again their national challenge saw them fall at the first hurdle, losing, 1–0, to eventual PDL national champions Laredo Heat.

2008 was a year of continued growth for Fuego in business terms, unveiling a new logo, and building on their new 3,000-strong fan base and their relationship with the Fresno Grizzlies at Chukchansi Park. On-field, the team stuttered slightly in the opening month of the season, winning just one of their first three games, 2–1, away at Southern California Seahorses. By mid-season, however, Fuego were burning up their opposition, with striker Pablo Campos continuing his free-scoring ways. He scored two in the 4–3 win over Orange County Blue Star, a hat trick in the 4–0 home win against Bakersfield Brigade, two more in the 4–1 demolition at Lancaster Rattlers, and another hat trick in the 6–2 annihilation of Los Angeles Legends in late June. By this time, Campos had been spotted by international scouts, and before the end of the month he was off to GAIS in Gothenburg, Sweden, to begin his professional career, leaving Fresno to find a replacement marksman. Campos's send-off was a disappointing one, with Fresno losing, 4–1, at home to Ventura County Fusion in his farewell game, and it was almost as though Campos' impending departure was affecting Fuego. They suffered another 4–1 home loss in July, this time to the San Fernando Valley Quakes, and by the time the season finale came down, Fuego's lead had been whittled away. The final regular season game, away at San Fernando Valley Quakes, was a winner-take-all game for the divisional title. The Quakes won it, 2–1, to take the championship, but Fresno made it through to the post-season to host the Western Conference championship for the second year in succession. Their first-round game was a rematch against Northwest Conference champions Tacoma Tide; however, without Campos's firepower, Fresno were toothless in attack, and eventually fell, 3–0. Despite leaving mid-season, Pablo Campos was still Fuego's top scorer with 14 goals, while the ever-dependable Fabricio Codeceira contributed 13 assists.

Fresno suffered one of their worst seasons in several years in 2009. A general lack of firepower – the result of losing Pablo Campos and Amaury Nunes to the professional ranks – and a frustrating tendency to inconsistency kept the Fuego on the back from their opening game, which they lost, 1–0, to divisional new boys Hollywood United Hitmen. Fuego bounced back with a 3–0 win over the Los Angeles Legends, and played Lancaster Rattlers to an astonishing 5–5 tie at the end of May where they were 4–0 down at half time, fought back to lead, 5–4, only to concede a last minute equalizer. The season's high point was the 5–1 hammering of Orange County Blue Star in June in which Santiago Aguilera Navarro his a brace; the low point was the 7–1 annihilation they suffered at the hands of the Legends at home a week later. A middling run through the middle part of the season left Fuego playing catchup as July began, and despite winning three of their final five games – including a 3–0 victory over local rivals Bakersfield Brigade and a 3–1 final day victory over divisional champions Hollywood, they finished the season in fifth place, out of the playoffs for the first time in three seasons. Tyler Reinhart and Paul Islas were Fresno's top scorers, with 5 goals each.

2010 was a season of two halves for Fresno. The first half of the season was generally poor. They lost their opening game of the season, 3–0, to the Hollywood United Hitmen, bounced back to beat the Ogden Outlaws, 4–0, but then were annihilated, 7–2, by Orange County Blue Star. The season's nadir came in the return game against Orange County in early June when the Fuego, 3–0 up after 52 minutes, fell apart and somehow managed to lose, 4–3, thanks to a hat trick from OC's striker Amani Walker. Things began to change in mid-June thanks to an impressive 4–1 away win over the Lancaster Rattlers; following this victory, Fuego embarked on a marvellous 8-game unbeaten streak to the end of the season, comprising 6 wins and 2 ties. Milton Blanco scored a 90th-minute winner in a seesaw 4–3 victory over the Southern California Seahorses which saw three red cards. They came back from a 2–1 deficit to beat Los Angeles Azul Legends, 3–2, in early July, in a game which saw the Legends reduced to 8 men in the second half, and wiped the floor with Lancaster on the final day of the regular season with a 7–0 victory in which second-half substitute Gabriel Gonzalez hit a hat trick. Unfortunately for Fresno their early season form proved to be their undoing, and despite rising from the bottom of the table, eventually finished fourth in the division, and out of the playoffs. Veteran Fuego midfielder Fabricio Codeceira was the team's top performer, with 10 goals and 7 assists on the season.

In 2017, Fresno Fuego FC were acquired by Fresno FC. Fresno Fuego FC were renamed Fresno FC U-23 on February 8, 2018. Also announced that day is the team will wear the colors of their parent club Fresno FC.

On February 1, 2019 the Fresno FC, parent of Fresno FC U-23 places the team on hiatus until the club has its own facility.

== Players ==
=== Notable former players ===
This list of notable former players comprises players who went on to play professional soccer after playing for the team in the Premier Development League, or those who previously played professionally before joining the team.

- (United States) Milton Blanco
- (Brazil) Pablo Campos
- (United States) Mike Chabala
- (United States) Jose Cuevas
- (United States) Cody Ellison
- (United States) Devon Grousis
- (United States) Ryan Kenny
- (United States) Paul Moran
- (United States) Alberto Navarro
- (Brazil) Amaury Nunes
- (United States) Nathan Smith
- (Cameroon) Cyprian Hedrick
- (United States) Marcus Cabello (Executive)

== Year-by-year ==
| Year | Division | League | Regular season | Playoffs | Open Cup | Avg. attendance |
Fresno Fuego
| 2003 | 4 | USL PDL | 1st, Southwest | Conference Finals | 4th Round | 316 |
| 2004 | 4 | USL PDL | 2nd, Southwest | National Semifinals | Did not qualify | 540 |
| 2005 | 4 | USL PDL | 3rd, Southwest | Conference Semifinals | Did not qualify | 345 |
| 2006 | 4 | USL PDL | 5th, Southwest | Did not qualify | Did not qualify | 1,147 |
| 2007 | 4 | USL PDL | 1st, Southwest | National Semifinals | Did not qualify | 3,068 |
| 2008 | 4 | USL PDL | 2nd, Southwest | Conference Semifinals | Did not qualify | 3,384 |
| 2009 | 4 | USL PDL | 5th, Southwest | Did not qualify | Did not qualify | 2,257 |
| 2010 | 4 | USL PDL | 4th, Southwest | Did not qualify | Did not qualify | 2,327 |
| 2011 | 4 | USL PDL | 1st, Southwest | Conference Finals | Did not qualify | 4,511 |
| 2012 | 4 | USL PDL | 3rd, Southwest | Did not qualify | 2nd Round | 3,047 |
| 2013 | 4 | USL PDL | 1st, Southwest | Conference Semifinals | Did not qualify | 2,826 |
| 2014 | 4 | USL PDL | 4th, Southwest | Did not qualify | 3rd Round | 2,290 |
| 2015 | 4 | USL PDL | 3rd, Southwest | Did not qualify | Did not qualify | 3,912 |
| 2016 | 4 | USL PDL | 1st, Central Pacific | Divisional Playoff | Did not qualify | 3,951 |
| 2017 | 4 | USL PDL | 2nd, Southwest | Conference Finals | 2nd Round | — |
Fresno FC U-23
| 2018 | 4 | USL PDL | 5th, Southwest | Did not qualify | Did not qualify | — |
| 2019 | On Hiatus | | | | | |

== Honors ==
- USL PDL Southwest Division Champions (5) : 2003, 2004, 2007, 2011, 2013
- USL PDL Central Pacific Division Champions: 2016
- USL PDL Regular Season Champions: 2011
- USL PDL Western Conference Champions: 2007

== Head coaches ==
- (Mexico) Jaime Ramirez (2003–2006)
- (United States) Scott Alcorn (2007–2015)
- (Republic of Ireland) Sean Lanigan (2016)
- (United States) Brian Zwaschka (2016–2017)

== Stadium ==
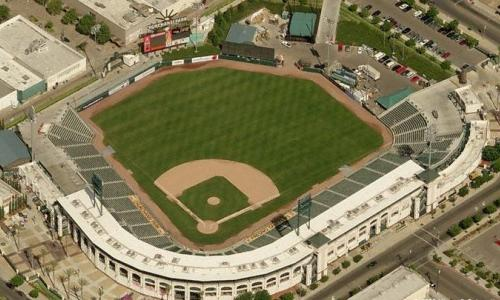
Chukchansi Park (2006–2018)

- Stadium at San Joaquin Memorial High School; Fresno, California (2003)
- Stadium at Fresno Pacific University; Fresno, California (2003–2005)
- Stadium at Golden West High School; Visalia, California, 2 games (2006)
- Stadium at Central High School; Fresno, California, 5 games (2006)
- Chukchansi Park; Fresno, California (2006–2018)
- Fresno State Soccer & Lacrosse Field, Fresno, California (2018)
