= Nevada Wonders =

- Full name: Nevada Wonders
- Nickname: The Wonders
- Founded: 2003
- Dissolved: 2005
- Ground: Carson High School; Carson City, Nevada
- Capacity: ????
- Chairman: (United States) Randy Roser
- Manager: (England) Paul Aigbogun
- League: USL Premier Development League
- 2005: 6th, Southwest Division; Playoffs: DNQ
Home colors	Away colors

Nevada Wonders were an American soccer team, founded in 2003. The team was a member of the United Soccer Leagues (USL) Premier Development League (PDL), the fourth tier of the American soccer pyramid, until 2005, when the team left the league and the franchise was terminated.

They played their home games in the stadium on the grounds of Carson High School in Carson City, Nevada. The team's colors were white, silver and blue.

== History ==
The Nevada Wonders were founded in 2003 to compete in the USL Premier Development League (PDL), considered the fourth tier of the American soccer pyramid. A Carson City, Nevada group, led by Randy Roser, were awarded the franchise in December 2002 to begin play in the following season, coinciding with the recent transition of former tier three USL D-3 Pro League team, Northern Nevada Aces, voluntarily becoming an amateur team and joining the newly founded Men's Premier Soccer League in 2003. The new franchise was awarded after the Aces vacated their territorial rights in the USL.

The Wonders would be coached by the former Aces coach, Paul Aigbogun, and lastly would play their home games out of Carson High School. The team was affiliated with Bury F.C., a professional club in England, through Aigbogun's connections. Their inaugural season in 2003 included matches against USL Pro Select League teams and included several players from England as well as collegiate recruits. The Wonders played for three years in the PDL's Southwest Division. The franchise was sold in October 2005 to Tom Simpson, who transferred the rights to the San Francisco area to revive the San Francisco Seals.

== Year-by-year ==
Year	Division	League	Regular season	Playoffs	Open Cup
2003	4	USL PDL	5th, Southwest	Did not qualify	Did not qualify
2004	4	USL PDL	5th, Southwest	Did not qualify	Did not qualify
2005	4	USL PDL	6th, Southwest	Did not qualify	Did not qualify

== Coaches ==
- (England) Paul Aigbogun (2003–2005)
- (England) Ben Callon (2005)

== Stadia ==
- Stadium at Carson High School, Carson City, Nevada 2003–05
