= 1991 Sunbelt Independent Soccer League (outdoor) season =

The 1991 Sunbelt Independent Soccer League was an American soccer season run by the Sunbelt Independent Soccer League.

== Regular season ==
- Regulation win = 6 points
- Shootout win (SW) = 4 points
- Shootout loss (SL) = 2 points
- Bonus Points (BP): 1 point for each goal scored up to 3 per game.

=== Southeast Conference ===
| Place | Team | GP | W | L | SW | SL | GF | GA | BPT | PTS |
|---|---|---|---|---|---|---|---|---|---|---|
| 1 | Memphis Rogues | 16 | 10 | 4 | 2 | 0 | 31 | 36 | 30 | 98 |
| 2 | Atlanta Quicksilver | 16 | 9 | 7 | 0 | 0 | 41 | 31 | 35 | 89 |
| 3 | Arkansas Diamonds | 16 | 8 | 7 | 0 | 1 | 30 | 30 | 26 | 76 |
| 4 | Nashville Metros | 16 | 6 | 9 | 1 | 0 | 30 | 35 | 23 | 63 |
| 5 | Atlanta Express | 16 | 4 | 10 | 0 | 2 | 20 | 40 | 19 | 47 |

=== Tex-Oma Conference ===
| Place | Team | GP | W | L | SW | SL | GF | GA | BPT | PTS |
|---|---|---|---|---|---|---|---|---|---|---|
| 1 | Richardson Rockets | 16 | 10 | 4 | 0 | 2 | 40 | 27 | 33 | 97 |
| 2 | Fort Worth Kickers | 16 | 10 | 4 | 1 | 1 | 30 | 18 | 26 | 92 |
| 3 | Tulsa Renegades | 16 | 7 | 7 | 1 | 1 | 39 | 28 | 28 | 76 |
| 4 | San Antonio Generals | 16 | 6 | 8 | 2 | 0 | 32 | 29 | 28 | 72 |
| 5 | Oklahoma City Warriors | 16 | 7 | 5 | 0 | 0 | 29 | 40 | 25 | 67 |
| 6 | Austin Soccadillos | 16 | 4 | 9 | 1 | 2 | 37 | 42 | 31 | 63 |

=== Southwest Conference ===
| Place | Team | GP | W | L | SW | SL | GF | GA | BPT | PTS |
|---|---|---|---|---|---|---|---|---|---|---|
| 1 | New Mexico Chiles | 16 | 11 | 5 | 0 | 0 | 38 | 18 | 30 | 96 |
| 2 | El Paso Patriots | 16 | 10 | 3 | 1 | 2 | 34 | 20 | 27 | 95 |
| 3 | Colorado Comets | 16 | 9 | 6 | 1 | 0 | 35 | 23 | 30 | 88 |
| 4 | Tucson Amigos | 16 | 6 | 7 | 1 | 2 | 20 | 23 | 17 | 61 |
| 5 | Phoenix Hearts | 16 | 5 | 9 | 2 | 0 | 27 | 26 | 21 | 59 |
| 6 | Lubbock Lazers | 16 | 1 | 15 | 0 | 0 | 7 | 74 | 7 | 13 |

== Playoffs ==
The Memphis Rogues won their first round series against the Atlanta Quicksilver. Having the best record in the league, the Rogues expected to play New Mexico Chiles in Memphis, but league commissioner Francisco Marcos moved the series to Albuquerque, New Mexico based on the higher number of spectators at Chiles games. When the Rogues withdrew from the playoffs in protest, Marcos shuffled the teams in the semifinal round. He replaced the Rogues with the El Paso Patriots which had the best record among the teams eliminated in the first round.

First Round
TN | Memphis Rogues | 1-2-1
GA | Atlanta Quicksilver | 2-0-0
TX | Richardson Rockets | 3-3
OK | Tulsa Renegades | 0-0
TX | Fort Worth Kickers | 3-2-2
TX | El Paso Patriots | 0-3-1
NM | New Mexico Chiles | 1
CO | Colorado Comets | 0

Semifinals
OK | Richardson Rockets | 2
TX | Fort Worth Kickers | 1
NM | New Mexico Chiles | 0-4-3
TX | El Paso Patriots | 1-1-0

Finals
TX | Richardson Rockets | 3
NM | New Mexico Chiles | 0

== Final ==
August 17, 1991

| Richardson Rockets (CO) | 3-0 | New Mexico Chiles (NM) |
|---|---|---|
| Paul Pedrosa (2:30); Curtis Partain (3:10); Eloy Salgado (53:55) | Report |

Lewisville, Texas
Attendance: 200

== Points leaders ==
| Rank | Scorer | Club | GP | Goals | Assists | Points |
|---|---|---|---|---|---|---|
| 1 | Uwe Balzis | New Mexico Chiles | 16 | 10 | 11 | 31 |
| 2 | Francisco Contreras | Oklahoma City Warriors | 14 | 13 | 4 | 30 |
| 2 | Vladi Stanojevic | New Mexico Chiles | 16 | 15 | 0 | 30 |
| 4 | Anthony Richardson | Tulsa Renegades | 13 | 11 | 4 | 26 |
| 5 | Wayne Gerhardt | Arkansas Diamonds | 15 | 8 | 9 | 25 |
| 6 | Ben Crawley | Austin Sockadillos | 11 | 10 | 4 | 24 |
| 6 | Mario Ribera | Fort Worth Kickers | 14 | 11 | 2 | 24 |
| 8 | Gabe Garcia | San Antonio Generals | 16 | 8 | 6 | 22 |
| 9 | Juan Rodriguez | Arkansas Diamonds | 13 | 10 | 1 | 21 |
| 9 | Chris Veselka | Austin Sockadillos | 13 | 7 | 7 | 21 |

== Awards ==
- MVP: David Pfeil, Richardson Rockets
- Leading goal scorer: Vladi Stanojevic, New Mexico (15 goals)
- Points Leader: Uwe Balzis, New Mexico (31 points)
- Assists Leader: Uwe Balzis, New Mexico (11 points)
- Leading goalkeepers: David West and Daniel Gonzalez, Memphis
- Coach of the Year: Phil Jones, Richardson Rockets
