= 1991–92 U.S. Interregional Soccer League (indoor) season =

The 1991–92 United States Interregional Soccer League season was an American indoor soccer season run by the United States Interregional Soccer League during the winter of 1991 to 1992.

== Regular season ==
=== Southeast Conference ===
Place	Team	GP	W	L	GF	GA	GD	Points
1	Atlanta Magic	8	7	1	121	78	+43	28
2	Memphis Survivors	8	6	2	68	57	+11	24
3	Atlanta Lightning	8	4	4	88	94	-6	16
4	Nashville Metros	8	2	6	45	72	-27	8
5	Arkansas Diamonds	8	1	7	49	70	-21	4

=== Southwest Conference ===
Place	Team	GP	W	L	GF	GA	GD	Points
1	Tucson Amigos	14	12	2	113	69	+44	48
2	Colorado Comets	14	10	4	133	80	+53	40
3	Lubbock Tornado	14	9	5	114	81	+33	36
4	Phoenix Hearts	14	5	9	79	93	-14	20
5	Amarillo Challengers	14	5	9	119	129	-10	20
6	Permian Basin Mirage	14	1	13	74	164	-90	4

=== Tex-Oma Conference ===
Place	Team	GP	W	L	GF	GA	GD	Points
1	Dallas Kickers	14	11	3	131	69	+62	44
2	Oklahoma City Warriors	14	11	3	120	57	+63	44
3	North Texas Mid-Cities Flyers	14	8	6	107	70	+37	32
4	San Antonio Generals	14	7	7	97	112	-15	28
5	Tulsa Renegades	14	5	9	73	112	-39	20
6	Austin Soccadillos	14	0	14	28	137	-109	0

== Playoffs ==
The 1991–92 USISL indoor playoffs were among the most peculiar in American sports history. Eight teams entered the playoff from the three conferences. However, the selection of those eight teams followed no apparent pattern. Although it appears the league selected the top two teams from each conference, the selection of the remaining two teams is inexplicable. First, the North Texas Mid-City Flyers, third ranked teams in the Tex-Oma Conference with 32 points entered the playoffs over the Lubbock Tornado (36 points) of the Southwest Conference. Then the third ranked team in the Southeast Conference, the Atlanta Lightning with 16 points, entered the playoffs over five other teams with better records. The playoffs began with several inter-conference games, again following no discernible pattern. The Dallas Kickers, top team in the Tex-Oma Conference, defeated the North Texas Mid-City Flyers in a two-game series. Then the Tucson Amigos defeated fellow Southwest Conference team Colorado Comets in a four-game series. Then, the Memphis Survivors, second ranked team in the Southeast Conference, lost to the Atlanta Lightning, the third ranked team in that conference in a single game. To finish the playoffs, the Atlanta Magic then defeated the Atlanta Lightning, also in a single game. Finally, the Oklahoma City Warriors, second ranked team in the Southwest Conference, did not play at all. In the second round, the four remaining team played a round robin with the two teams with the best record advancing to the final.

=== First round ===
- Dallas Kickers 7–3, 13-6 North Texas Mid-City Flyers
- Tucson Amigos 9–5, 4–3, 3–9, 7-6 (OT) Colorado Comets
- Atlanta Lightning 8-4 Memphis Survivor
- Atlanta Magic 11-3 Atlanta Lightning

=== Sizzlin' Four ===
Place	Team	W	L	GF	GA	GD
1	Atlanta Magic	3	0	21	16	+5
2	Oklahoma City Warriors	2	1	22	15	+7
3	Dallas Kickers	1	2	9	14	-5
4	Tucson Amigos	0	3	12	19	-7

February 28, 1992

Dallas Kickers (TX)	3-2	Tucson Amigos (AZ)

Chico's Indoor Soccer Arena, Oklahoma City, Oklahoma

February 28, 1992

Oklahoma City Warriors (OK)	6-9	Atlanta Magic (GA)

Chico's Indoor Soccer Arena, Oklahoma City, Oklahoma

February 1992

Atlanta Magic (GA)	8-7	Tucson Amigos (AZ)

Chico's Indoor Soccer Arena, Oklahoma City, Oklahoma

February 1992

Oklahoma City Warriors (OK)	8-3	Dallas Kickers (TX)

Chico's Indoor Soccer Arena, Oklahoma City, Oklahoma

February 1992

Atlanta Magic (GA)	4-3	Dallas Kickers (TX)

Chico's Indoor Soccer Arena, Oklahoma City, Oklahoma

February 1992

Oklahoma City Warriors (OK)	8-3	Tucson Amigos (AZ)

Chico's Indoor Soccer Arena, Oklahoma City, Oklahoma

== Final ==
March 1, 1992

Oklahoma City Warriors (OK)	7-2	Atlanta Magic (GA)

Chico's Indoor Soccer Arena, Oklahoma City, Oklahoma

== Points leaders ==
Rank	Scorer	Club	GP	Goals	Assists	Points
1	Chris Melton	Amarillo Challengers	13	37	14	88
2	Andy Crawford	Colorado Comets	14	25	22	77
3	Enrique Serrano	Amarillo Challengers	13	28	14	70
4	F. Manzano	Tucson Amigos	12	25	16	66
4	D. Watland	Amarillo Challengers	14	23	20	66
6	Marcelo Draguicevich	San Antonio Generals	11	22	21	65
7	Mike Cook	Oklahoma City Warriors	12	20	21	61
8	Jeff Rogers	Phoenix Hearts	11	19	19	57
8	C. Hobbs	Lubbock Tornado	14	21	15	57
10	Chris Cook	Atlanta Magic	12	21	12	54

== Honors ==
- Most Valuable Player: Chris Cook
- Top Goal Scorer: Chris Melton
- Coach of the Year: Carlos Acosta
- Rookie of the Year: Noel Clackum and Emillo Romero
