= 1990 Southwest Independent Soccer League (outdoor) season =

The 1990 Southwest Independent Soccer League was an American outdoor soccer season run by the Southwest Independent Soccer League during the summer of 1990. This was the second outdoor and sixth overall season run by the league which would become known as the United Soccer League.

== Regular season ==
- Regulation win = 6 points
- Shootout win (SW) = 4 points
- Shootout loss (SL) = 2 points
- Bonus Points (BP): 1 point for each goal scored up to 3 per game.

=== Eastern Conference ===
Place	Team	GP	W	L	SW	SL	BP	GF	GA	PTS
1	Tulsa Renegades	14	11	1	1	1	34	45	17	106
2	Austin Sockadillos	14	8	4	0	2	33	45	27	85
3	San Antonio Generals	14	8	4	2	0	29	38	25	85
4	Richardson Rockets	14	7	7	0	0	28	38	22	70
5	North Texas United	14	7	7	1	0	25	36	30	68
6	Arkansas Diamonds	14	6	6	0	2	20	26	34	60
7	Waco Kickers	14	1	13	0	0	9	9	54	15
8	Oklahoma City Warriors	6	1	5	0	0	7	7	25	13

=== Western Conference ===
Place	Team	GP	W	L	SW	SL	BP	GF	GA	PTS
1	Lubbock Lazers	14	11	3	0	0	35	52	28	101
2	Colorado Comets	14	11	2	1	0	30	38	17	100
3	Phoenix Hearts	14	7	6	1	0	30	39	29	76
4	Tucson Amigos	14	7	6	0	1	28	29	20	68
5	Albuquerque Gunners	14	3	11	0	0	17	17	51	35
6	Permian Basin Shooting Stars	14	2	12	0	0	19	20	43	31

== Playoffs ==
=== Quarterfinals ===
- Colorado Comets defeated Lubbock Lazers 5–1, 5-2
- Richardson Rockets defeated Tulsa Renegades 1–2, 1–0, 3-1
- Austin Sockadillos defeated San Antonio Generals 0–1, 4–1, 3-2
- Tucson Amigos defeated Phoenix Hearts 2–1, 2-1

=== Semifinals ===
- Richardson Rockets defeated Austin Sockadillos 2–1, 5-1
- Colorado Comets defeated Tucson Amigos 2–0, 1-0

== Final ==
- Colorado Comets declared champion based on overall record.

== Points leaders ==
Rank	Scorer	Club	GP	Goals	Assists	Points
1	Marek Friederich	Lubbock Lazers	13	11	10	32
2	Chris Veselka	Austin Sockadillos	10	12	7	31
3	Derek Sholeen	Lubbock Lazers	10	12	5	29
4	Shane Schwab	Tulsa Renegades	13	11	5	27
5	Marcelo Draguicevich	Austin Sockadillos	13	12	2	26
5	Anthony Richardson	Tulsa Renegades	13	11	4	26
7	Gabe Garcia	San Antonio Generals	13	11	3	25
8	S. Gallegos	Phoenix Hearts	13	10	2	22
9	Kevin Coughlin	North Texas United	13	9	3	21

== Awards ==
- MVP: Craig Lammering, Colorado Comets
- Top Scorer: Marek Friederich, Lubbock Lazers (32 points)
  - Leading goal scorer: Chris Veselka, Derek Sholeen, Marcelo Draguicevich (12 goals each)
- Leading Assists: Marek Friederich (10)
- Top Goalkeeper: Craig Lammering, Colorado Comets
- Coach of the Year: Phil Jones, Richardson Rockets
