= 1990–91 Sunbelt Independent Soccer League (indoor) season =

The 1990–91 Sunbelt Independent Soccer League was an American indoor soccer season run by the Sunbelt Independent Soccer League during the winter of 1990–91.

== History ==
In the fall of 1990, the league expanded outside of the western United States for the first time when it added teams from Arkansas, Georgia, and Tennessee. The expansion led the league to change its name to the Sunbelt Independent Soccer League.

== Regular season ==
- Win = 4 points
- Loss = 0 points

=== Southeast Conference ===
Place	Team	P	W	L	GF	GA	GD	Points
1	Richardson Rockets	20	18	2	174	76	+98	72
2	Oklahoma City Warriors	20	14	6	144	91	+53	56
3	Fort Worth Kickers	20	12	8	158	105	+53	48
4	Tulsa Renegades	20	12	8	134	122	+12	48
5	Atlanta Express	20	11	9	133	132	+1	44
6	Memphis Rogues	20	8	12	132	145	+13	32
7	Georgia Steamers	10	5	5	61	56	+5	20
8	Arkansas Diamonds	20	5	15	109	138	−29	20
9	Nashville Metros	10	0	10	44	124	−80	0

=== Southwest Conference ===
Place	Team	P	W	L	GF	GA	GD	Points
1	Tucson Amigos	20	15	5	174	100	+74	60
2	Austin Soccadillos	20	14	6	162	113	+49	56
3	Colorado Comets	20	13	7	178	71	+107	52
4	Phoenix Hearts	20	13	7	144	97	+47	52
5	Lubbock Lazers	20	12	8	156	107	+49	48
6	Permian Basin Shooting Stars	20	4	16	86	181	−95	16
7	New Mexico Roadrunners	10	1	9	39	112	−73	4
8	El Paso Spurs	10	0	10	30	142	−112	0
9	San Antonio Generals	20	0	20	62	227	−165	0

=== Playoffs ===
First Round
TX	Fort Worth Kickers	9–9–7
TX	Richardson Rockets	6–7–4
OK	Oklahoma City Warriors	8–9
OK	Tulsa Renegades	7–5
AZ	Phoenix Hearts	9–8
AZ	Tucson Amigos	3–7
CO	Colorado Comets	7–10–6
TX	Austin Soccadillos	6–9–1

Semifinals
OK	Oklahoma City Warriors	6–3–8
TX	Fort Worth Kickers	3–7–6
CO	Colorado Comets	9–9
AZ	Tucson Amigos	6–3

Finals
CO	Colorado Comets	8–7–5
OK	Oklahoma City Warriors	3–5–4

== Semifinals ==
=== Oklahoma City Warriors vs Fort Worth Kickers ===
March 1991

Oklahoma City Warriors (OK)	6–3	Fort Worth Kickers (TX)
Mohamad Momenia; Manny Uceda

Chico's Indoor Soccer Arenas, Oklahoma City, Oklahoma

March 1991

Oklahoma City Warriors (OK)	3–7	Fort Worth Kickers (TX)
Mike Cook

Chico's Indoor Soccer Arenas, Oklahoma City, Oklahoma

March 17, 1991

Oklahoma City Warriors (OK)	8–6	Fort Worth Kickers (TX)
Rasool Faily; Mike Cook; Mohamad Momenia

Chico's Indoor Soccer Arenas, Oklahoma City, Oklahoma

=== Colorado Comets vs Tucson Amigos ===
March 1991

Colorado Comets (CO)	9–6	Tucson Amigos (AZ)

March 1991

Colorado Comets (CO)	9–3	Tucson Amigos (AZ)

== Final ==
March 30, 1991

Oklahoma City Warriors (OK)	3–8	Colorado Comets (CO)

Chico's Indoor Soccer Arenas, Oklahoma City, Oklahoma

March 31, 1991

Oklahoma City Warriors (OK)	5–7	Colorado Comets (CO)

Chico's Indoor Soccer Arenas, Oklahoma City, Oklahoma

Oklahoma City Warriors (OK)	4–5	Colorado Comets (CO)
		Rob Zimmerman; Peter Horvath; Omar Melendez

Chico's Indoor Soccer Arenas, Oklahoma City, Oklahoma

== Points leaders ==
Rank	Scorer	Club	GP	Goals	Assists	Points
1	Andy Crawford	Colorado Comets	16	35	26	96
2	Albertico Morales	Tucson Amigos	17	42	10	94
3	Chino Melendez	Colorado Comets	16	32	25	89
4	Enrique Serrano	Tucson Amigos	19	26	29	81
5	Marcelo Draguicevich	Austin Sockadillos	12	33	17	80
6	M. Aranda	Austin Sockadillos	12	30	19	79
7	Nicolai Vassiliev	Oklahoma City Warriors	18	26	18	70
8	Juan Rodriguez	Arkansas Diamonds	16	32	5	69
9	Mark Perdew	Colorado Comets	16	21	21	63
10	F. Manzano	Tucson Amigos	18	17	28	62

== Awards ==
- MVP: Chino Melendez, Colorado Comets
- Top Goal Scorer: Albertico Morales, Tucson Amigos
- Rookie of the Year: Albertico Morales, Tucson Amigos
- Coach of the Year: Caesar Cervin, Ft. Worth Kickers
