= 1992–93 U.S. Interregional Soccer League (indoor) season =

The 1992–93 United States Interregional Soccer League season was an American indoor soccer season run by the United States Interregional Soccer League during the winter of 1992 to 1993.

== Regular season ==
=== Southeast Conference ===
| Place | Team | GP | W | L | GF | GA | GD | Points |
|---|---|---|---|---|---|---|---|---|
| 1 | Atlanta Magic | 12 | 12 | 0 | 135 | 35 | +100 | 48 |
| 2 | Chattanooga Railroaders | 12 | 7 | 5 | 87 | 70 | +17 | 28 |
| 3 | Knoxville Impact | 12 | 4 | 8 | 82 | 136 | -54 | 16 |
| 4 | Nashville Metros | 12 | 1 | 11 | 57 | 117 | -60 | 4 |

=== South Central Conference ===
| Place | Team | GP | W | L | GF | GA | GD | Points |
|---|---|---|---|---|---|---|---|---|
| 1 | Oklahoma City Warriors | 12 | 11 | 1 | 103 | 55 | +48 | 44 |
| 2 | Dallas Kickers | 12 | 7 | 5 | 91 | 87 | +4 | 28 |
| 3 | San Antonio Generals | 12 | 6 | 5 | 96 | 88 | +8 | 24 |
| 4 | Texas Stampede | 12 | 2 | 10 | 76 | 104 | -28 | 8 |

=== Southwest Conference ===
| Place | Team | GP | W | L | GF | GA | GD | Points |
|---|---|---|---|---|---|---|---|---|
| 1 | Tucson Amigos | 12 | 8 | 4 | 101 | 74 | +27 | 30 |
| 2 | Arizona Cotton | 12 | 7 | 5 | 104 | 72 | +32 | 28 |
| 3 | Lubbock Lazers | 12 | 6 | 6 | 79 | 78 | +1 | 25 |

== Playoffs ==
=== First round ===
In February 1993, the USISL continued its tradition of peculiar playoffs. The first round had two Southwest Conference teams, the Arizona Cotton and Tucson Amigos playing two games. Arizona won both 6-3 and 10-9. Then, all four Southeast Conference teams, the Atlanta Magic, Chattanooga Railroaders, Knoxville Impact, played a round robin series to determine which team advanced in the playoffs. Both South Central Conference teams, the Oklahoma City Warriors and Dallas Kickers received first round byes.

==== Southeast Conference playoff group ====
| Place | Team | W | L | GF | GA | GD |
|---|---|---|---|---|---|---|
| 1 | Atlanta Magic | 3 | 0 | 20 | 6 | +14 |
| 2 | Chattanooga Railroaders | 2 | 1 | 13 | 11 | +2 |
| 3 | Knoxville Impact | 0 | 2 | 4 | 10 | -6 |
| 4 | Nashville Metros | 0 | 2 | 2 | 12 | -10 |

- Game 1: Atlanta 6, Nashville 0
- Game 2: Atlanta 7, Knoxville 2
- Game 3: Chattanooga 3, Knoxville 2
- Game 4: Chattanooga 6, Nashville 2
- Game 5: Atlanta 7, Chattanooga 4
- Game 6: Nashville vs. Knoxville - Not played

=== Sizzling Four ===
Although the Oklahoma City Warriors finished with the same record and a better goal differential than the Arizona Cotton, the Cotton had defeated the Warriors, giving them the second spot in the Sizzlin' Four round.

| Place | Team | W | L | GF | GA | GD |
|---|---|---|---|---|---|---|
| 1 | Atlanta Magic | 2 | 0 | 12 | 2 | +10 |
| 2 | Arizona Cotton | 1 | 1 | 6 | 7 | -1 |
| 3 | Oklahoma City Warriors | 1 | 1 | 9 | 8 | +1 |
| 4 | Dallas Kickers | 0 | 2 | 6 | 14 | -8 |

March 5, 1993
8:00 PM (CST)

| Atlanta Magic (GA) | 8-2 | Dallas Kickers (TX) |

Chico's Indoor Soccer Arena, Oklahoma City, Oklahoma

March 5, 1993
9:30 PM (CST)

| Oklahoma City Warriors (OK) | 3-4 | Arizona Cotton (AZ) |

Chico's Indoor Soccer Arena, Oklahoma City, Oklahoma

March 6, 1993
7:00 PM (CST)

| Atlanta Magic (GA) | 4-2 | Arizona Cotton (AZ) |

Chico's Indoor Soccer Arena, Oklahoma City, Oklahoma

March 6, 1993
8:30 PM (CST)

| Oklahoma City Warriors (OK) | 6-4 | Dallas Kickers (TX) |

Chico's Indoor Soccer Arena, Oklahoma City, Oklahoma

== Final ==
March 7, 1993
1:30 PM (CST)

| Atlanta Magic (GA) | 11-7 | Arizona Cotton (AZ) |

Chico's Indoor Soccer Arena, Oklahoma City, Oklahoma

== Points leaders ==
| Rank | Scorer | Club | GP | Goals | Assists | Points |
|---|---|---|---|---|---|---|
| 1 | Marcello Draguicevich | San Antonio Generals | 10 | 25 | 11 | 61 |
| 2 | L. Larkin | Chattanooga Railroaders | 12 | 24 | 4 | 52 |
| 3 | Chris Hellenkamp | Atlanta Magic | 11 | 17 | 17 | 51 |
| 4 | Ledge Ledwith | Tucson Amigos | 9 | 16 | 10 | 46 |
| 5 | K. Stevens | Lubbock Lazers | 11 | 20 | 5 | 45 |
| 5 | Danny Sanchez | Arizona Cotton | 12 | 18 | 9 | 45 |
| 7 | Caleb Suri | Atlanta Magic | 10 | 15 | 14 | 44 |
| 8 | Rudy Corral | Tucson Amigos | 11 | 15 | 12 | 42 |
| 8 | Greg Veatch | Arizona Cotton | 12 | 15 | 12 | 42 |
| 10 | Randy Soderman | Arizona Cotton | 10 | 8 | 25 | 41 |

== Honors ==
- Most Valuable Player: Richie Richmond
- Top Goal Scorer: Marcello Draguicevich
- Top Goalkeeper: Yaro Dachniwsky
- Coach of the Year: Zelimar Antonievic,
- Rookie of the Year: Omar Felix
