= 1989–90 Southwest Independent Soccer League (indoor) season =

The 1989–90 Southwest Independent Soccer League was an American indoor soccer season run by the Southwest Independent Soccer League during the winter of 1989-1990.

== Regular season ==
=== Eastern Conference ===
==== Texas Division ====
Pos	Team	Pld	W	L	GF	GA	GD	BP	Pts
1	Richardson Rockets	24	17	7	176	112	+64	18	69
2	Austin Sockadillos	24	14	10	165	130	+35	14	56
3	Waco Kickers	24	11	13	132	182	−50	11	44
4	Houston Express	24	2	22	66	143	−77	3	9
5	San Antonio Generals	13	1	12	60	91	−31	1	4

Rules for classification: 3 points for a win, 1 points for a loss, and 1 bonus point for a regulation win or a shoot-out loss.

==== Tex-Ark-Oma Division ====
Pos	Team	Pld	W	L	GF	GA	GD	BP	Pts
1	Addison Arrows	24	17	7	179	122	+57	17	68
2	Tulsa Renegades	24	14	10	170	155	+15	12	54
3	Oklahoma City Warriors	24	13	11	138	131	+7	14	53
4	Arkansas Diamonds	12	2	10	46	97	−51	2	8

Rules for classification: 3 points for a win, 1 points for a loss, and 1 bonus point for a regulation win or a shoot-out loss.

=== Western Conference ===
==== Central Division ====
Pos	Team	Pld	W	L	GF	GA	GD	BP	Pts
1	Colorado Comets	24	21	3	235	102	+133	21	84
2	Lubbock Lazers	24	19	5	199	106	+93	19	76
3	Permian Basin Shootin' Stars	24	5	19	142	218	−76	6	21
4	Amarillo Challengers	24	5	19	125	272	−147	4	19

Rules for classification: 3 points for a win, 1 points for a loss, and 1 bonus point for a regulation win or a shoot-out loss.

==== Cactus Division ====
Pos	Team	Pld	W	L	GF	GA	GD	BP	Pts
1	Phoenix Hearts	24	21	3	207	118	+89	21	84
2	Tucson Amigos	24	12	12	128	126	+2	10	46
3	Albuquerque Gunners	24	9	15	157	167	−10	10	37
4	El Paso Sixshooters	24	0	24	44	179	−135	0	0

Rules for classification: 3 points for a win, 1 points for a loss, and 1 bonus point for a regulation win or a shoot-out loss.

== Playoffs ==
First Round
TX	Richardson Rockets	7-7
OK	Tulsa Renegades	5-6
TX	Addison Arrows	12-8
TX	Austin Sockadillos	4-5
CO	Colorado Comets	5-9
AZ	Tucson Amigos	4-4
AZ	Phoenix Hearts	7-4
TX	Lubbock Lazers	6-0

Semifinals
TX	Addison Arrows	7-5
TX	Richardson Rockets	5-4
AZ	Phoenix Hearts	6-7-11
TX	Colorado Comets	4-8-10

Finals (March 1990)
TX	Addison Arrows	9-9-10
AZ	Phoenix Hearts	6-8-3

== Awards ==
- MVP: Andy Crawford, Permian Basin/Colorado
- Top Scorer: Enrique Serrano, Albuquerque Gunners
- Rookie of the Year: Jose Miranda, Tucson Amigos
- Coach of the year: Peter Baralić, Phoenix Hearts
