= 1995–96 U.S. Indoor Soccer League season =

The 1995–96 United States Indoor Soccer League season was an American soccer season run by the United Systems of Independent Soccer Leagues during the winter of 1995 to 1996.

== Regular season ==
This season, the league allowed several teams to play exhibition games against league opponents. Although these teams, which included the Connecticut Wolves, DFW Toros, Delaware Wizards, Jersey Dragons, Nashville Metros, Pennsylvania Freedom, Chattanooga Express and Washington Mustangs, were not officially in the league, the games were counted in the standings.

Games counted as four points for a win, three for a shootout win, one for a shootout loss and zero for a loss. Only one game went to a shootout. In it, the Knoxville Impact defeated the non-league Chattanooga Express.

=== Northeast Division ===
| Place | Team | GP | W | L | GF | GA | GD | Points |
|---|---|---|---|---|---|---|---|---|
| 1 | Baltimore Bays | 7 | 7 | 0 | 99 | 42 | +57 | 28 |
| 2 | Pennsylvania Freedom | 2 | 0 | 2 | 12 | 31 | -19 | 0 |
| 3 | Jersey Dragons | 1 | 0 | 1 | 5 | 15 | -10 | 0 |
| 4 | Connecticut Wolves | 1 | 0 | 1 | 5 | 15 | -10 | 0 |
| 5 | Delaware Wizards | 2 | 0 | 2 | 16 | 24 | -8 | 0 |
| 6 | Washington Mustangs | 1 | 0 | 1 | 4 | 14 | -10 | 0 |

=== Mid-South Division ===
| Place | Team | GP | W | L | GF | GA | GD | Points |
|---|---|---|---|---|---|---|---|---|
| 1 | Atlanta Magic | 12 | 12 | 0 | 137 | 50 | +87 | 48 |
| 2 | Knoxville Impact | 11 | 7 | 4 | 88 | 88 | +0 | 27 (Note: The Knoxville Impact had one shootout win, worth three points.) |
| 3 | Orlando Lions | 10 | 6 | 4 | 78 | 68 | +10 | 24 |
| 4 | Brandon Braves | 12 | 4 | 8 | 63 | 91 | -28 | 16 |
| 5 | Chattanooga Express | 6 | 2 | 4 | 34 | 56 | -22 | 9 (Note: The Chattanooga Express had one shoot out loss, worth one point.) |
| 6 | Cocoa Expos | 11 | 2 | 9 | 70 | 92 | -22 | 8 |
| 7 | Nashville Metros | 5 | 0 | 5 | 22 | 62 | -40 | 0 |

=== Central Division ===
| Place | Team | GP | W | L | GF | GA | GD | Points |
|---|---|---|---|---|---|---|---|---|
| 1 | Dallas Lightning | 12 | 10 | 2 | 127 | 77 | +50 | 40 |
| 2 | Tulsa Roughnecks | 12 | 6 | 6 | 106 | 91 | +15 | 24 |
| 3 | Oklahoma City Slickers | 12 | 6 | 6 | 83 | 88 | -5 | 24 |
| 4 | Mesquite Kickers | 12 | 2 | 10 | 75 | 135 | -60 | 8 |
| 5 | DFW Toros | 2 | 0 | 2 | 9 | 17 | -8 | 0 |

== Playoffs ==
=== Sizzlin’ Five ===
- Atlanta Magic 6, Dallas Lightning 4
- Baltimore Bays 7, Tulsa Roughnecks 6
- Dallas Lightning 10, Oklahoma City Slickers 7
- Baltimore Bays 12, Oklahoma City Slickers 10 (Overtime)
- Atlanta Magic 10, Tulsa Roughnecks 8

=== Final ===
February 18, 1996

| Baltimore Bays (MD) | 10-8 | Atlanta Magic (GA) |
|---|---|---|
| Denison Cabral | (Report) |

Tulsa, Oklahoma

MVP: Denison Cabral

== Points leaders ==
| Rank | Scorer | Club | Goals | Assists | Points |
|---|---|---|---|---|---|
| 1 | Juha Miettinen | Knoxville Impact | 21 | 5 | 47 |
| 2 | Chris Hellenkamp | Atlanta Magic | 12 | 21 | 45 |
| 3 | Virgil Stevens | Tulsa Roughnecks | 18 | 8 | 44 |
| 3 | Shane Schwab | Tulsa Roughnecks | 16 | 10 | 42 |
| 5 | Aaron Gordon | Dallas Kickers | 17 | 7 | 41 |
| 6 | Kyle Owen | Mesquite Kickers | 16 | 7 | 39 |
| 6 | Keiran Breslin | Cocoa Expos | 15 | 7 | 37 |
| 6 | Richie Richmond | Atlanta Magic | 15 | 7 | 37 |
| 6 | Denison Cabral | Baltimore Bays | 12 | 8 | 32 |
| 6 | Colin Rocke | Dallas Kickers | 11 | 10 | 32 |

== Honors ==
- MVP: Denison Cabral
- Coach of the Year: Kevin Healey
