= 1987–88 Southwest Indoor Soccer League season =

The 1987–88 Southwest Indoor Soccer League was the second season of the American Southwest Indoor Soccer League.

== League standings ==
| Pos | Team | Pld | W | L | GF | GA | GD | BP | Pts |
|---|---|---|---|---|---|---|---|---|---|
| 1 | Oklahoma City Warriors | 20 | 13 | 7 | 132 | 94 | +38 | 1 | 53 |
| 2 | Albuquerque Gunners | 20 | 13 | 7 | 152 | 93 | +59 | 1 | 53 |
| 3 | Austin Sockadillos | 20 | 10 | 10 | 118 | 107 | +11 | 0 | 40 |
| 4 | Arlington Arrows | 20 | 10 | 10 | 94 | 109 | −15 | −1 | 39 |
| 5 | Lubbock Lazers | 20 | 9 | 11 | 93 | 110 | −17 | −1 | 35 |
| 6 | Amarillo Challengers | 20 | 5 | 15 | 87 | 153 | −66 | 0 | 20 |

== Playoffs ==
=== Austin Sockadillos vs Albuquerque Gunners ===
- Austin Sockadillos defeated Albuquerque Gunners

=== Oklahoma City Warriors vs Arlington Arrows ===
March 5, 1988

| Arlington Arrows (TX) | 3-6 | Oklahoma City Warriors (OK) |

Arlington, Texas

March 12, 1988
8:00 PM CST

| Oklahoma City Warriors (OK) | 5-4 | Arlington Arrows (TX) |
|---|---|---|
| Terry Woodberry; Mike Cook | (Report) |

Indoor Soccer Arena, Oklahoma City, Oklahoma
- Oklahoma City Warriors advance, winning two out of three games.

== Final ==
March 19, 1988
8:00 PM CST

| Oklahoma City Warriors (OK) | 8-5 | Austin Sockadillos (TX) |

Indoor Soccer Arena, Oklahoma City, Oklahoma

March 20, 1988
1:00 PM CST

| Oklahoma City Warriors (OK) | 9-7 | Austin Sockadillos (TX) |

Indoor Soccer Arena, Oklahoma City, Oklahoma

March 26, 1988

| Oklahoma City Warriors (OK) | 11-3 | Austin Sockadillos (TX) |

Indoor Soccer Arena, Oklahoma City, Oklahoma
- MVP: Mike Cook

== Goals leaders ==
| Rank | Scorer | Club | Goals | Assists |
|---|---|---|---|---|
| 1 | Uwe Balzis | Albuquerque Gunners | 43 | |
| 2 | Chris Melton | Amarillo Challengers | 36 | |
| 3 | Terry Woodberry | Oklahoma City Warriors | 35 | 18 |
| 4 | Oscar Borgarello | Arlington Arrows | 32 | |
| 5 | Jeff Brown | Austin Soccadillos | 27 | |
| 5 | Mike Cook | Oklahoma City Warriors | 27 | |
| 7 | Jay LeForce | Oklahoma City Warriors | 24 | |
| 8 | Austin Hudson | Oklahoma City Warriors | 23 | 30 |

== Awards ==
- MVP: Austin Hudson, Oklahoma City Warriors
- Top Goal Scorer: Uwe Balzis, Albuquerque Gunners (43 goals)
- Assist Leader: Austin Hudson, Oklahoma city Warriors (29 assists)
- Top Goalkeeper: Todd Brunskill, Addison Arrows
- Rookie of the Year: Steve Bailey, Austin Sockadillos
- Coach of the Year: Chico Villar, Oklahoma City Warriors
