= Austin Hudson (soccer) =

American soccer player and coach

Personal information
- Date of birth: December 31, 1959 (age 66)
- Place of birth: Belleville, Illinois, United States
- Positions: Forward; midfielder

Youth career
- 1979–1980: Belleville Area College

Senior career*
Years	Team	Apps	(Gls)
1981–1982	Kansas City Comets (indoor)	2	(0)
1982–1984	Oklahoma City Slickers/Stampede		
1984–1986	Louisville Thunder (indoor)		
1986–1987	Memphis Storm (indoor)		
1987–1988	Oklahoma City Warriors (indoor)		(24)
1988	Austin Thunder		
1988–1989	Dayton Dynamo (indoor)		
1989	Oklahoma City Warriors		
1989–1990	Oklahoma City Warriors (indoor)		
1990	Tulsa Renegades		
1990–1991	Oklahoma City Warriors	10	
1992–1993	Oklahoma City Warriors		
1993–1994	Oklahoma City Slickers		
1996	Oklahoma City Heat		

Managerial career
- 1989–1990: Oklahoma City Warriors (assistant)
- 1990: Tulsa Renegades
- 2008–2015: Fort Worth FC
- * Club domestic league appearances and goals

Austin Hudson is an American soccer coach and retired player. He was the head coach of Fort Worth FC of the Women's Premier Soccer League and played professionally in the Major Indoor Soccer League, American Indoor Soccer Association, second American Soccer League, United Soccer League, and the USISL. He was the 1989 Southwest Indoor Soccer League MVP.

Some accounts state Hudson spent 1978 with the Seattle Sounders. If he did, he never signed a professional contract as Hudson entered Belleville Area College in 1979 and played two seasons of college soccer. He was a 1980 Honorable Mention National Junior College All American. A September 10, 1981, newspaper article mentions a soccer camp at which "professional players . . . Austin Hudson (Cleveland)" will instruct. Regardless, Hudson spent the 1981-1982 Major Indoor Soccer League season with the Kansas City Comets. In 1982, he moved to the Oklahoma City Slickers of the American Soccer League. The American Soccer League collapsed after the 1983 season, and the Slickers moved to the newly created United Soccer League and changed their name to the Oklahoma City Stampede. In the fall of 1984, Hudson signed with the Louisville Thunder of the American Indoor Soccer Association. On September 25, 1986, the Memphis Storm of the AISA signed Hudson. He broke his shoulder during the season and returned to Oklahoma City to rehabilitate the shoulder. In 1987, Hudson joined the Oklahoma City Warriors of the Southwest Indoor Soccer League. He was the 1987–88 Southwest Indoor Soccer League MVP and assists leader. Hudson then returned to the outdoor game with the Austin Thunder during the 1988 Lone Star Soccer Alliance season. In the fall of 1988, he went on trial with several teams in Germany, but returned to sign with the Dayton Dynamo of the AISA. In January 1989, Hudson returned to the Warriors as a player-assistant coach. That summer the Warriors played outdoors in the 1989 Southwest Outdoor Soccer League. Hudson played for them as they finished last in the league, then remained with the Warriors for the 1989–90 Southwest Independent Soccer League season. In the fall of 1990, Hudson began the season as the head coach of the Tulsa Renegades. The Renegades released him at mid-season and Hudson returned to the Warriors in December 1990. He played ten games, then quit the team in February 1991 after a dispute with the team's management. In August 1992, Hudson was back with the Warriors. When the Warriors merged with the Oklahoma City Spirit of the LSSA and formed the Oklahoma City Slickers, Hudson continued to play for the new team until the end of the 1994 season. In 1996, he played for the Oklahoma City Heat. In 2008, he became the head coach of Fort Worth FC of the Women's Premier Soccer League.
