= Mike Cook (soccer) =

Canadian retired soccer player

Personal information
- Full name: Mychal Cook
- Place of birth: Toronto, Canada
- Positions: Forward; midfielder

Youth career
- 1983–1984: Bethany Nazarene Crimson Storm

Senior career*
Years	Team	Apps	(Gls)
1986–1990	Oklahoma City Warriors		
1990	Colorado Comets		
1990–1993	Oklahoma City Warriors		
1993–1995	Oklahoma City Slickers		
1997–1998	Oklahoma City Warriors		

Managerial career
- 1987–1992: Southern Nazarene Crimson Storm (assistant)
- 1993–1997: Southern Nazarene Crimson Storm
- 1998–: Central Oklahoma Bronchos
- * Club domestic league appearances and goals

Mychal "Mike" Cook is a retired Canadian soccer player who spent his career in the USISL. He is the head coach of the Central Oklahoma Bronchos women's soccer team.

== Player ==
From 1984–1985, Cook attended Bethany Nazarene College, playing on the men's soccer team during those years. In 1986, Cook joined the newly created Oklahoma City Warriors of the Southwest Indoor Soccer League. The Warriors finished third in the regular season, falling to the Lubbock Lazers in the first round of the playoffs. During the 1987–88 Southwest Indoor Soccer League, Cook finished fifth on the scoring list with twenty-seven goals. The Warriors again made the playoffs, winning the league championship over the Austin Sockadillos. Cook was the playoff MVP. Cook continued his scoring pace during the 1988–89 Southwest Indoor Soccer League season with twenty-five goals. In August 1990, Cook joined the Colorado Comets as they prepared for the 1990 playoffs. The Comets went on to win the championship after which Cook returned to the Warriors for the 1990–91 indoor season. During the 1991–92 indoor season, Cook scored twenty goals in twelve games. In February 1993, the Warriors merged with the Oklahoma City Spirit for the upcoming 1993 outdoor season. The combined team was renamed the Oklahoma City Slickers. Cook played for the Slickers from at least May 1993 through the 1995 outdoor season. Cook then played for the reconstituted Oklahoma City Warriors during the 1997–98 USISL I-League

In 2006, Cook was inducted into the USL Hall of Fame.

== Coach ==
Even during his playing career, Cook also coached at the collegiate level. In 1987, he became an assistant with his alma mater, now known as Southern Nazarene University. In 1993, he became the head coach of both the men's and women's teams. In his five seasons as head coach, Cook took the men's team to a 58–44–2 record and the women to an 88–22–1 record. In 1998, the University of Central Oklahoma hired Cook to establish a women's soccer team. From 1998 to 2012, he led the team to a 230–75–19 record.

== Head coaching record ==
=== Men's soccer ===
Record table
Season	Team	Overall	Conference	Standing	Postseason
Southern Nazarene Crimson Storm () (1993–1997)
1993	Southern Nazarene	17–6–0	7–1–0		NAIA Area
1994	Southern Nazarene	10–10–1	4–2–0		NAIA Sectional
1995	Southern Nazarene	10–10–1	5–3–0		NAIA Sectional
1996	Southern Nazarene	11–10–0	4–4–0		
1997	Southern Nazarene	10–10–0	2–6–0		NAIA SW Region
Southern Nazarene:		58–44–2	?–?–?		
Total:		58–44–2			
National champion Postseason invitational champion Conference regular season champion Conference regular season and conference tournament champion Division regular season champion Division regular season and conference tournament champion Conference tournament champion

=== Women's soccer ===
Record table
Season	Team	Overall	Conference	Standing	Postseason
Southern Nazarene Crimson Storm () (1993–1997)
1993	Southern Nazarene	16–1–0	4–0–0		NAIA Super Regional
1994	Southern Nazarene	14–5–0	3–2–0		NAIA SW Region
1995	Southern Nazarene	21–3–1	5–0–0	1st	NAIA
1996	Southern Nazarene	22–5–0	7–0–0	1st	NAIA
1997	Southern Nazarene	15–8–0	3–3–0		NAIA SW Region
Southern Nazarene:		88–22–1	?–?–?		
Central Oklahoma Bronchos (Lone Star Conference) (1998–2010)
1998	Central Oklahoma	11–9–0	4–4–0		
1999	Central Oklahoma	13–5–1	5–3–1		NCAA Champions
2000	Central Oklahoma	21–3–0	7–0–0	1st	NCAA Second Round
2001	Central Oklahoma	15–6–0	5–2–0		
2002	Central Oklahoma	20–3–0	7–1–0	1st	NCAA First Round
2003	Central Oklahoma	15–5–2	7–2–0		NCAA First Round
2004	Central Oklahoma	13–6–2	7–1–1		
2005	Central Oklahoma	16–3–2	8–1–0	1st	NCAA First Round
2006	Central Oklahoma	18–3–1	9–0–0	1st	NCAA First Round
2007	Central Oklahoma	19–5–0	10–0–0	1st	NCAA Third Round
2008	Central Oklahoma	13–6–3	6–3–1		
2009	Central Oklahoma	14–6–3	7–3–0		NCAA First Round
2010	Central Oklahoma	11–8–1	6–4–0		
Central Oklahoma Bronchos (Independent) (2011–present)
2011	Central Oklahoma	15–4–0			NCAA First Round
Central Oklahoma Bronchos (Mid-America Intercollegiate Athletics Association) (2012–present)
2012	Central Oklahoma	16–3–3	9–0–3		NCAA Second Round
2013	Central Oklahoma	9–10–2	4–5–2		
2014	Central Oklahoma	14–5–3	9–3–2		NCAA Second Round
2015	Central Oklahoma	12–5–3	7–2–2		
2016	Central Oklahoma	15–7–1	8–3–0		
2017	Central Oklahoma	7–10–2	4–5–2		
Central Oklahoma:		?–?–?	?–?–?		
Total:		?–?–?			
National champion Postseason invitational champion Conference regular season champion Conference regular season and conference tournament champion Division regular season champion Division regular season and conference tournament champion Conference tournament champion
