= 1988–89 Southwest Indoor Soccer League season =

The 1988–89 Southwest Indoor Soccer League season was an American indoor soccer season run by the Southwest Indoor Soccer League.

== League standings ==
=== North Division ===
Pos	Team	Pld	W	L	GF	GA	GD	Pts
1	Addison Arrows	24	15	9	137	124	+13	61
2	Oklahoma City Warriors	24	15	9	132	99	+33	61
3	Wichita Tornado	24	6	18	99	155	−56	22

=== South Division ===
Pos	Team	Pld	W	L	GF	GA	GD	Pts
1	Austin Sockadillos	24	19	5	167	98	+69	76
2	Houston Express	24	11	13	144	156	−12	44
3	San Antonio Heat	24	6	18	116	166	−50	24

=== West Division ===
Pos	Team	Pld	W	L	GF	GA	GD	Pts
1	Lubbock Lazers	24	17	7	157	113	+44	67
2	Albuquerque Gunners	24	16	8	213	120	+93	65
3	Amarillo Challengers	24	3	21	106	231	−125	12

== Playoffs ==
First Round
TX	Addison Arrows	3	5
OK	Oklahoma City Warriors	2	4
TX	Lubbock Lazers
NM	Albuquerque Gunners
TX	Houston Express
TX	San Antonio Heat
7
2

Semifinals
NJ	Lubbock Lazers
NJ	Addison Arrows
TX	Austin Sockadillos
TX	Houston Express

Finals
TX	Lubbock Lazers
TX	Austin Sockadillos

== First round ==
=== Lubbock Lazers vs Albuquerque Gunners ===
March 1989

Albuquerque Gunners (NM)	2-3	Lubbock Lazers (TX)

March 1989

Lubbock Lazers (TX)	5-4	Albuquerque Gunners (NM)

=== Addison Arrows vs Oklahoma City Warriors ===
March 3, 1989
8:00 PM CST

Oklahoma City Warriors (OK)	9-3	Addison Arrows (TX)
Jay LeForce; Mike Cook; Steve McGuire; Austin Hudson; Rasool Family

Indoor Soccer Arena, Oklahoma City, Oklahoma

March 4, 1989
8:00 PM CST

Addison Arrows (TX)	6-5	Oklahoma City Warriors (OK)

Dallas, Texas

March 5, 1989
1:30 PM CST

Addison Arrows (TX)	6-3	Oklahoma City Warriors (OK)

Dallas, Texas

=== Houston Express vs San Antonio Heat ===
March 1989

San Antonio Heat (TX)	12-11	Houston Express (TX)

March 1989

Houston Express (TX)	5-4	San Antonio Heat (TX)

March 1989

Houston Express (TX)	3-1	San Antonio Heat (TX)

== Semifinals ==
- The Lubbock Lazers defeated the Addison Arrows: 4-6, 8-6, 10-8, 4-10, 8-5
- The Austin Sockadillos defeated the Houston Express: 7-6(OT), 11-7, 12-9

== Championship series ==
April 1989

Austin Sockadillos (TX)	4-7	Lubbock Lazers (TX)

April 1989

Austin Sockadillos (TX)	2-6	Lubbock Lazers (TX)

April 7, 1989

Austin Sockadillos (TX)	6-5 OT	Lubbock Lazers (TX)
Raul Valdez

Tatu's Indoor Soccer Place, Austin, Texas

April 9, 1989

Austin Sockadillos (TX)	7-4	Lubbock Lazers (TX)
Brian Monaghan; John Callejas; Steve Bailey; Mike Carlisle

Tatu's Indoor Soccer Place, Austin, Texas

April 9, 1989

Austin Sockadillos (TX)	1-2	Lubbock Lazers (TX)
Raul Valdez		Marek Friedrich; Billy Tullis

Tatu's Indoor Soccer Place, Austin, Texas

== Honors ==
- Most Valuable Player: Brian Monaghan, Austin Sockadillos
- Top Scorer: Brian Monaghan, Austin Socadillos (71 goals)
- Assist Leader: Uwe Balzis, Austin Sockadillos (28 assists)
- Top Goalkeeper: David Swissler, Lubbock Lazers
- Rookie of the Year: Todd Hoodenpyle, Lubbock Lazers
- Coach of the Year: António Simões, Austin Sockadillos
