= David West (soccer) =

American soccer player

Personal information
- Date of birth: January 11, 1967 (age 59)
- Height: 6 ft 1 in (1.85 m)
- Position: Goalkeeper

Senior career*
Years	Team	Apps	(Gls)
1989–	Memphis Rogues		
1994–1995	Houston Hotshots (indoor)	1	(0)
1995–1996	Tampa Bay Terror (indoor)	6	(0)
1998	Dallas Sidekickes (indoor)	1	(0)
- * Club domestic league appearances and goals

David West is a retired American soccer goalkeeper who played professionally in the Continental Indoor Soccer League and National Professional Soccer League.

On December 15, 1989, the Memphis Rogues of the American Indoor Soccer Association signed West. In 1990, Memphis moved to the Sunbelt Independent Soccer League. During the 1991 Sunbelt Independent Soccer League season, West and fellow Memphis goalkeeper Daniel Gonzalez were the top rated goalkeeper combo. In 1994, West played for the Houston Hotshots in the Continental Indoor Soccer League. In 1995, he saw not playing time before being placed on the disabled list in August. That fall, he moved to the Tampa Bay Terror of the National Professional Soccer League for one season. In 1998, he played one game for the Dallas Sidekickes in the Premier Soccer Alliance.
