= John Hedlund =

American soccer coach (born 1962)

Personal information
- Date of birth: March 16, 1962 (age 64)
- Place of birth: Bay Shore, New York, United States
- Height: 6 ft 3 in (1.91 m)
- Position: Defender

College career
Years	Team	Apps	(Gls)
1980–1984	Midwestern State University		

Senior career*
Years	Team	Apps	(Gls)
1986–1987	New York Express (indoor)	16	(0)
1987	Dallas Sidekicks (indoor)	10	(0)
1988–1993	Dallas Rockets		
1993–1995	Dallas Sidekicks (indoor)	68	(15)

Managerial career
- 1990: North Texas Mean Green (assistant)
- 1995–: North Texas Mean Green
- * Club domestic league appearances and goals

John Hedlund (born March 16, 1962) is an American soccer coach who oversees the North Texas Mean Green women's soccer program. He is a retired defender who played in the Major Indoor Soccer League, USISL, and Continental Indoor Soccer League. In 1995, Hedlund concluded a 12-year professional playing career, in which he played defender for the United States Men's Olympic team (1983–84), the New York Express (1984–85), the Dallas Sidekicks (1986–87 and 1992–95) and the Dallas Rockets (1988–91).

== Player ==
=== Amateur ===
Hedlund graduated from Plano Senior High School. He attended Midwestern State University, playing on the men's soccer team from 1980 to 1984. A four-year letter winner at Midwestern State University, Hedlund was twice voted to the NAIA All-America team in college (1983 & 1984). He scored 26 goals and added 12 assists, playing several different positions on the pitch. He was named the Most Valuable Player in the 1983 NAIA National Tournament in which he tied the all- time tournament record of scoring four goals in one game. Hedlund helped lead the Indians to the National finals both his sophomore and junior year (1983 & 1984). He graduated with a bachelor's degree in criminal justice and with a minor in sociology in 1985 and was inducted into the Midwestern State Hall of Fame in 1984. During his collegiate career, Hedlund played for the U.S. Olympic soccer team traveling to Finland, Sweden, South Korea and all throughout the United States playing in several games/tournaments representing his country.

=== Professional ===
In 1986, Hedlund signed with the New York Express of the Major Indoor Soccer League. The Express folded about two-thirds of the way through the season. On March 20, 1987, Hedlund signed as a free agent with the Dallas Sidekicks. He played the last ten games of the 1986–1987 MISL season and continued to play for the Sidekicks into the playoffs. That year, they won the MISL championship, defeating the Tacoma Stars. In 1988, Hedlund joined the Richardson Rockets of the Southwest Independent Soccer League. In 1991, the Rockets won the 1991 SISL championship and went to the final of the 1991 U.S. Open Cup, where they fell to the Brooklyn Italians. The Rockets went to the fourth round of the 1992 CONCACAF Champions' Cup, where it fell to Club América at Azteca Stadium in Mexico. In June 1993, Hedlund left the Rockets, now known as the Dallas Rockets, to sign with the Dallas Sidekicks, who were then playing summer indoor soccer in the Continental Indoor Soccer League. The Sidekicks won the 1993 CISL championship, defeating the San Diego Sockers then fell in the finals of the 1994 championship to the Las Vegas Dustdevils. Hedlund was a part of two championships with the Dallas Sidekicks; the 1987 & 1993 team. As a defender, Hedlund scored 15 goals and dished out 19 assists in 78 games. He ranks 19th in team history in blocked shots (120). During the playoffs, Hedlund had a total of 33 blocked shots, the 12th most in Sidekicks history. Hedlund scored five goals in the 1994 CISL playoffs for the Sidekicks, and ranks 20th in club history in playoff goals. Hedlund retired from professional soccer in 1995 to be the head women's soccer coach at the University of North Texas.

=== Coaching career ===
In 20 years of coaching at North Texas, John Hedlund has established himself as one of the most successful coaches in Texas and the central region. Hedlund has served as the only head coach in Mean Green soccer history and has won 299 games, which ranks 19th all-time among NCAA Division I women's soccer head coaches.

In 21 years as the head coach at North Texas, Hedlund has secured winning seasons in every season. Since 1995, Hedlund has led North Texas to a 373–141–40 record (71.0 percent); the ninth-best winning percentage among all active coaches nationally at just one school.

The 2015 season might go down as the best in school history. North Texas set a school record with 19 victories, the team won back-to-back regular season titles, won its first Conference USA tournament championship and advanced to the NCAA tournament for the fourth time in school history. The team finished the season ranked No. 3 in the central region and received notes in the national poll throughout the season.

Hedlund and has teams have won 11 conference titles in his 21 years coaching. He has led the Mean Green to seven regular season titles and four trips to the NCAA Tournament (2004, 2005, 2012, 2015). Hedlund led the Mean Green into the Conference USA era in 2013, and earned the league's No. 2 seed and a trip to the C-USA title game.
