= Chico Villar =

Peruvian-American soccer coach (born 1947)

Personal information
- Full name: Nestor Villar
- Date of birth: March 13, 1947 (age 79)
- Place of birth: Peru
- Height: 5 ft 0 in (1.52 m)

Managerial career
- Years: Team
- 1982–1985: Oklahoma City Slickers (assistant)
- 1986–1993: Oklahoma City Warriors
- 1993–1995: Oklahoma City Warriors (assistant)

Nestor “Chico” Villar (born 13 March 1947) is a retired Peruvian-American soccer player and coach. He was a two-time Coach of the Year in the Southwest Indoor Soccer League.

== Coaching career ==
Villar played professionally in Peru for seven years before moving to the United States in order to earn a master's degree in education at Oklahoma City University in 1971. He remained in the United States, coaching and playing at the amateur level. In 1983, he became an assistant coach with the Oklahoma City Slickers of the American Soccer League. In 1984, the Slickers moved to the newly created United Soccer League after the collapse of the ASL. During these year, Villar was also a coaching director in the Oklahoma Soccer Association. In February 1985. Villar opened the Indoor Soccer Arena at 100 N McCormick in Oklahoma City. At the time it was the only indoor soccer facility in the city. In 1986, Villar was part of the amateur Oklahoma City Hot Spurs which won the Oklahoma State championship. In November 1986, Villar, along with other local soccer enthusiasts, founded the Oklahoma City Warriors and entered it into the newly created Southwest Indoor Soccer League. In that first season, Villar was named Coach of the Year as the Warriors fell in the playoff semifinals. In 1988, Villar repeated as Coach of the Year as the Warriors took the SISL title over the Austin Sockadillos. In 1992, Villar again led the Warriors to the SISL indoor title. In February 1993, the Oklahoma City Warriors and the Oklahoma City Spirit of the Lone Star Soccer Alliance merged to form the second Oklahoma City Slickers. Villar became an assistant coach and general manager of the Slickers. In 1995, the Slickers finished runner-up to the Atlanta Magic.

== Criminal offences ==
However, Villar left the Slickers organization after being arrested for committing lewd acts with a minor.

He was convicted, sentenced to probation, but convicted again in 1997 while on probation and sent to prison.
