= Caesar Cervin =

American soccer player (born 1967)

Personal information
- Date of birth: January 29, 1953 (age 73)
- Place of birth: El Paso, Texas, U.S.
- Position: Midfielder

Youth career
- SMU Mustangs

Senior career*
Years	Team	Apps	(Gls)
1978–1979	Cleveland Force (indoor)	19	(8)
1979–	Wichita Wings (indoor)	20	(0)
1981	Dallas Tornado	0	(0)
1982	Oklahoma City Slickers	0	(0)
1985	Dallas Americans		
1989–1990	Addison Arrows (indoor)		
- 1995–2014: Dallas Sidekicks (assistant coach)
- 1991: Fort Worth Kickers (head coach)
- 2011: Texas Outlaws (head coach)
- * Club domestic league appearances and goals

Caesar Cervin is an American retired soccer midfielder. He played professionally in the Major Indoor Soccer League, United Soccer League and Southwest Indoor Soccer League (SISL). He later coached teams in the SISL where he was the 1991 Coach of the Year, USISL, Lone Star Soccer Alliance and was a fourteen-year assistant coach with the Dallas Sidekicks.

== Player ==
While born in Texas, Cervin grew up in Mexico. After graduating from high school, he attended Southern Methodist University where he played on the men's soccer team.Caesar was one of the captains of the SMU Mustang Extra-mural soccer team. He captained the team to the Texas championship dispatching what was considered the top ranked team from North Texas State in the semi-finals. In the championship game with the University of Texas, he scored the goal ahead goal on a shootout when the game ended in a tie. When the goalkeeper blocked the subsequent shot, the Mustangs won the championship. He is pictured along with most of the active players in the 1975 SMU Yearbook which can be sourced through the University. In 1978, he signed with the Cleveland Force of the Major Indoor Soccer League. He then played an unknown number of seasons with the Wichita Wings. In 1981, he signed with the Dallas Tornado of the North American Soccer League, but saw no first team games. In March 1982, he signed with the Oklahoma City Slickers of the American Soccer League. In June 1982, the Slickers released him after he failed to enter a game. He returned to Dallas where he was a "part-owner of an automotive repair shop". In 1985, he played for the Dallas Americans in the United Soccer League. In 1989, he signed with the Addison Arrows of the Southwest Indoor Soccer League. In 1990, he both coached and played for the FC Dallas of the Lone Star Soccer Alliance.

== Coach ==
In 1982, Norman High School hired Cervin as head coach of the boys' soccer team. In 1990, he coached FC Dallas in the Lone Star Soccer Alliance. He took Dallas to the LSSA championship where they fell to the Oklahoma City Spirit. Later that year, he was hired by the Dallas Sidekicks of Major Indoor Soccer League as an assistant coach. He remained with the Sidekicks until 2004. In 1991, he coached the Fort Worth Kickers in the Southwest Independent Soccer League. He was the SISL Coach of the Year. During the 1994-1995 USISL season, he coached the expansion Mesquite Kickers. In 1996, he returned to the Fort Worth Kickers, now known as the Dallas Lightning. On September 9, 2008, the Texas Outlaws of the Professional Arena Soccer League hired Cervin.
