= 1996–97 USISL I-League season =

The 1996–97 USISL I-League was an American soccer season run by the United Systems of Independent Soccer Leagues during the winter of 1996 to 1997.

== Regular season ==
=== East Division ===
Place	Team	GP	W	L	GF	GA	GD	Points
1	Baltimore Bays	11	11	0	136	40	+96	44
2	Rhode Island Stingrays	5	2	3	41	55	-14	8
3	Philadelphia Freedom	6	0	6	29	91	-62	0

=== West Division ===
Place	Team	GP	W	L	GF	GA	GD	Points
1	Tulsa Roughnecks	15	11	4	140	90	+50	44
2	Omaha Flames	11	6	5	93	60	+33	24
3	Mesquite Kickers	8	4	4	61	119	-58	16
4	Oklahoma City Alliance	12	3	9	71	61	+10	12

=== Limited schedule teams ===
Place	Team	GP	W	L	GF	GA	GD	Points
1	Des Moines Menace	2	2	0				8
2	Worcester Wildfire	2	1	1				4
3	Kansas City All-Stars	3	1	2				4
4	Lincoln Brigade	3	0	3				0
5	New Hampshire Phantoms	2	0	2				0
5	Delaware Wizards	1	0	1				0
5	Reading Rage	1	0	1				0

== Final ==
March 1997

Baltimore Bays (MD)	5-4 OT	Tulsa Roughnecks (OK)

March 1997

Baltimore Bays (MD)	13-10	Tulsa Roughnecks (OK)

MVP:

== Honors ==
- Most Valuable Player: Billy Ronson
- Top Point Scorer: Billy Ronson (70)
- Top Scorer: Brian Adams (23)
- Top Goalkeeper: Dave Tenney
- Rookie of the Year: Jessie Williams
- Coach of the Year: Kevin Healey
