= Ed Puskarich =

American soccer player and coach (born 1962)

Personal information
- Date of birth: April 4, 1962 (age 64)
- Place of birth: Hanover Park, Illinois, United States
- Height: 6 ft 0 in (1.83 m)
- Position: Defender

College career
Years	Team	Apps	(Gls)
1980–1983	SMU Mustangs		

Senior career*
Years	Team	Apps	(Gls)
1984	Houston Dynamos		
1984–1986	Columbus Capitals (indoor)	67	(2)
1986–1987	Fort Wayne Flames (indoor)	17	(2)
1987	Los Angeles Lazers (indoor)		
1987–1988	Memphis Storm (indoor)	3	(0)
1988–1989	Dayton Dynamo (indoor)		
1989–1995	Chicago Power (indoor)	181	(54)
1995–1996	Milwaukee Wave (indoor)	56	(6)
1995	Rockford Raptors		
1996	Dallas Burn	18	(0)
2000	Texas Spurs		
2001–2003	→ Texas Rattlers		

Managerial career
- 1993: North Central Cardinals
- 1994–1995: Aurora Spartans
- 1997–2000: Dallas Burn (assistant)
- 1998: Texas Toros
- 2001–2003: Texas Spurs
- 2023–2024: Dallas Sidekicks
- 2025: Texas Outlaws
- * Club domestic league appearances and goals

Ed Puskarich (born April 4, 1962) is a retired U.S. soccer defender who had an extensive career which began in 1984 in the United Soccer League and ended in the Premier Development League. In between, he played in the American Indoor Soccer Association, National Professional Soccer League, USISL and Major League Soccer. He has coached at the youth, college and professional levels including four as an assistant coach and scout with the Dallas Burn. He is the former head coach of the Dallas Sidekicks in the Major Arena Soccer League.

== Player ==
Puskarich attended Southern Methodist University where he played on the men's soccer team from 1980 to 1983. He was also a placekicker and wide receiver on the SMU football team in 1982. In 1984, he signed with the Houston Dynamos of the United Soccer League. The Dynamos went to the league championship where they lost to the Fort Lauderdale Sun. In fall 1984, he signed with the Columbus Capitals of the American Indoor Soccer Association. The Capitals lasted two seasons before folding in 1986. On September 16, 1986, he signed with the Fort Wayne Flames for the 1986-1987 AISA season. According to his biography, he spent time in 1987 with the Los Angeles Lazers in the Major Indoor Soccer League. However, it does not specify whether this was the beginning or end of 1987. However, he then signed with the Memphis Storm for the 1987-1988 AISA season. He then moved to the Dayton Dynamo for the 1988–1989 season before transferring to the Chicago Power in November 1989. He infamously endured his first cramp in 1990 at the age of 28. He remained with the Power until ownership turmoil in 1994 led him to leave the team. During those years, the AISA was renamed the National Professional Soccer League and won the 1991 NSPL championship. In January 1995, he signed with the Milwaukee Wave. He finished the 1994–1995 season with the Wave then played the 1995 USISL outdoor season with the Rockford Raptors before returning to the Wave for the 1995-1996 NPSL season. That was his last season in the NPSL. He finished his time in the league ranked ninth on the all-time list of games played in the NPSL with 370 games. In February 1996, the Dallas Burn selected Puskarich in the fifteenth round (143rd overall) in the 1996 MLS Inaugural Player Draft. He made the team and played eighteen games with the Burn in 1996. He retired at the end of the season, but returned to professional soccer in 2000 with the Texas Rattlers in the USL D3 Pro League. In 2001, the league became the Premier Development League and the team, now under new ownership, became the Texas Spurs. Puskarich remained with the Spurs through the 2003 season.

== Coach ==
In addition to his extensive playing career, Puskarich is a longtime coach. In 1993, he became the head coach of the NCAA Division III North Central College soccer team. On April 6, 1994, he moved to Aurora University which had just established a women's soccer program. In 1996, the university gave him a leave of absence to play for the Dallas Burn. He did not return. In 1997, he was hired as an assistant coach for the Burn, a position he held until 2000. In 1998, he became head coach of the Texas Toros. In 2001, he became the head coach of the Texas Spurs, a position he held until 2003.

Puskarich used to manage the TFC Youth soccer club in the Dallas area before it dissolved.

On August 21, 2023, Puskarich was named head coach of the Dallas Sidekicks in the Major Arena Soccer League.
