= Vince Beck =

Scottish footballer

Personal information
- Date of birth: January 26, 1963 (age 63)
- Place of birth: Greenock, Scotland
- Position: Defender

Youth career
- 1981: SIU Edwardsville Cougars
- 1983–1985: Old Dominion

Senior career*
Years	Team	Apps	(Gls)
1986–1989	Memphis Storm (indoor)		
1990–1991	Wichita Wings (indoor)	42	(1)
1992–1995	Dayton Dynamo (indoor)	107	(34)
1995–1996	Cincinnati Silverbacks (indoor)	43	(15)
1996	Ohio Xoggz		
1996–1998	Philadelphia KiXX (indoor)	23	(2)
2003	Memphis Express	14	(0)
- * Club domestic league appearances and goals

Vince Beck is a Scottish retired football defender who spent twelve years in the American indoor leagues.

== Youth ==
Born and raised in Scotland, Beck attended Southern Illinois University Edwardsville where he played three games during the 1981 season. In 1983, he resumed his collegiate career at Old Dominion where he played until 1985. He completed his undergraduate degree at Old Dominion in 1997.

== Professional ==
In 1986, Beck turned professional with the Memphis Storm of the American Indoor Soccer Association. He spent three seasons with the Storm and was 1988 First Team All League. In 1990, Beck signed with the Wichita Wings of the Major Indoor Soccer League. Beck spent at least three seasons (1992–1995) with the Dayton Dynamo of the National Professional Soccer League. In 1995, he played for the expansion Cincinnati Silverbacks in the NPSL. In 1996, he spent the outdoor season with the Ohio Xoggz of the USISL. That fall, he signed with the Philadelphia KiXX where he played until 1998. In 2003, he returned to playing with the Memphis Express in the USL Premier Development League.
