= Terry Woodberry =

Personal information
- Date of birth: September 9, 1963 (age 63)
- Place of birth: London, England
- Height: 6 ft 0 in (1.83 m)
- Position: Midfielder

Youth career
- Chelsea FC

College career
Years	Team	Apps	(Gls)
1981–1982	Bethany Nazarene Redskins		
1986–1987	Southern Nazarene Redskins		

Senior career*
Years	Team	Apps	(Gls)
1987–1988	Oklahoma City Warriors (indoor)	20	(34)
1988–1991	Dallas Sidekicks (indoor)	90	(29)
1991–1992	San Diego Sockers (indoor)	40	(21)
1992–1994	Wichita Wings (indoor)	80	(98)
1993	→ Tulsa Roughnecks (loan)		
1994–1995	Arizona Sandsharks (indoor)	41	(43)
1995	Wichita Wings (indoor)	7	(2)
1995–1996	Detroit Rockers (indoor)	8	(7)
1996	Dallas Sidekicks (indoor)	26	(17)
1999–2001	Dallas Sidekicks (indoor)	63	(33)

International career
1992	U.S. Futsal		

Managerial career
- 2023–2024: Dallas Sidekicks (assistant)
- 2024: Dallas Sidekicks (interim)
- 2024–: Dallas Sidekicks
- * Club domestic league appearances and goals

Terry Woodberry, also spelled as Terry Woodbury, (born September 9, 1963) is a former English-American football (soccer) midfielder who spent his entire career playing indoor soccer in the United States. He was also a member of the U.S. Futsal team which took second place at the 1992 FIFA Futsal World Cup.

== Player ==
=== Youth ===
Woodberry grew up in London, playing in the Chelsea FC youth system before moving to the United States to attend college at Southern Nazarene University. Woodberry first attended Southern Nazarene from 1981 to 1983 and then again from 1986 to 1987. He played two seasons of NAIA college soccer each during his two stints at the school. In 1986, he was an NAIA honorable mention All American and in 1987, he was a third team All American.

=== Professional ===
In 1987, Woodberry signed with the Oklahoma City Warriors of the Southwest Indoor Soccer League. He was the third leading scorer as the Warriors won the league championship. 1988, the Dallas Sidekicks of Major Indoor Soccer League drafted Woodberry in the fourth round (thirty-ninth overall). He spent three seasons in Dallas before moving to the San Diego Sockers for the 1991–1992 season. The Sockers won the MISL championship, the last in the league history. The league folded following the championship series and Woodberry moved to the Wichita Wings of the National Professional Soccer League (NPSL). For the 1993 outdoor season he was "loaned" to the Tulsa Roughnecks (USISL). He was a first team All Star in the 1993-1994 NPSL season. In 1994, he was with the Arizona Sandsharks of the Continental Indoor Soccer League where he earned first team All Star recognition. In 1996, the Sandsharks temporarily withdrew from the league and Woodberry rejoined the Sidekicks, now also playing in the CISL. Woodberry was drafted in the 4th Round of the 1988 MISL Draft with the 39th overall selection by the Sidekicks. Honor Roll. That year, he was also selected by the Kansas City Wiz in the fourteenth round (136th overall) in the 1996 MLS Inaugural Player Draft. The Wiz waived him on March 26, 1996. Woodberry then began the 1995-1996 NPSL season with the Wichita Wings, but played only seven games before moving to the Detroit Rockers for the remainder of the season. In 1999, Woodberry returned to the Sidekicks which now played in the World Indoor Soccer League. In 2001, Woodberry and his teammates won the WISL championship.

=== Futsal ===
In 1992, Woodberry was a member of the U.S. Futsal team which took second place at the FIFA Futsal World Cup.

== Championship ==
- 1991-92 San Diego Sockers Major Soccer League
- 2001 Dallas Sidekicks World Indoor Soccer League

== Coach ==
In August 2004, he became a coach with the youth club Dallas Solar. In 2007, he was the Region III USASA Coach of the Year.

Woodberry was named to the staff of Major Arena Soccer League club Dallas Sidekicks in September 2023. He was appointed interim coach for the team in March 2024. In April 2024, Woodberry was named full-time head coach.
