= Antonio Carbognani =

Argentine footballer and manager

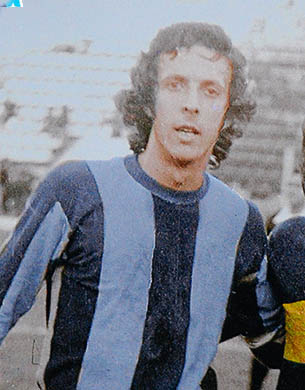
- Carbognani playing for San Telmo, 1976

Personal information
- Full name: Antonio Ángel Carbognani
- Date of birth: 5 November 1953
- Place of birth: Buenos Aires, Argentina
- Position: Midfielder

Youth career
- 1961–1972: Huracán
- 1972–1974: Independiente

Senior career*
Years	Team	Apps	(Gls)
1974–1976	San Telmo	30	(1)
1976–1979	Barcelona SC		
1979	New York Cosmos	12	(1)
1979–1980	Memphis Rogues (indoor)	8	(5)
1980	Memphis Rogues	21	(1)
1981–1984	Memphis Americans (indoor)	124	(59)
1983	Jacksonville Tea Men		
1984–1985	Las Vegas Americans (indoor)	48	(9)
1985–1986	Baltimore Blast (indoor)	33	(5)
1987–1989	Memphis Storm (indoor)		
1989–1990	Memphis Rogues (indoor)		
1990–1991	Chicago Power (indoor)	21	(5)
1991	Memphis Rogues		
1991–1992	Memphis Survivors (indoor)		
1994	Memphis Jackals		

Managerial career
- 1988–1990: Memphis Rogues
- 2002–2005: Memphis Express
- * Club domestic league appearances and goals

Antonio "Toni" Carbognani (born 5 November 1953) is an Argentine retired professional footballer who played as a midfielder for the New York Cosmos and the Memphis Rogues in the NASL. He later managed the Memphis Express of the USL Premier Development League.

== Player ==
Carbognani started his playing career with San Telmo in 1975. In 1976, he was sold to Barcelona Sporting Club of Ecuador. In 1979, he was signed by New York Cosmos of the North American Soccer League. In the fall of 1979, the Cosmos sent him to the Memphis Rogues in time for the NASL indoor season. He then played the 1980 outdoor season for the Rogues. In the fall of 1981, Carbognani signed with the Memphis Americans of the Major Indoor Soccer League. In 1983, he played for the Jacksonville Tea Men of the American Soccer League. In 1984, the Memphis Americans moved to Las Vegas, Nevada where the team spent the 1984–1985 MISL season as the Las Vegas Americans. The team folded at the end of the season and the league declared Carbognani to be a free agent. He then signed with the Baltimore Blast. The Blast released him at the end of the season and Carbognani moved to the Memphis Storm of the American Indoor Soccer Association. The team changed its name to the Rogues before the 1989–1990 season. That year, Carbognani both played and coached the team. In 1990, he moved to the Chicago Power. The AISA had also changed its name to the National Professional Soccer League. In 1991, he was back with the Rogues who were now playing in the Southwest Independent Soccer League. In the fall of 1991, the Rogues were renamed the Memphis Survivors and they played in the USISL indoor league. He may not have played again until the summer of 1994 when he was on the Memphis Jackals roster.

== Coach ==
In the fall of 1988, the Memphis Storm elevated Carbognani to the position of player-head coach. At the end of the season, they replaced him with Don Tobin and Carbognani continued as a player only. In December 1989, Carbognani replaced Don Tobin the head coach.
