= 1997–98 USISL I-League season =

The 1997–98 USISL I-League was an American soccer league run by the United Systems of Independent Soccer Leagues during the winter of 1997 to 1998.

== Regular season ==
=== Full schedule ===
Place	Team	GP	W	L	GF	GA	GD	Points
1	Baltimore Bays	10	10	0	118	40	+78	30
2	Tulsa Roughnecks	13	10	3	128	86	+42	30
3	Omaha Flames	14	8	6	143	92	+51	24
4	Oklahoma City Warriors	10	3	7	50	94	-44	9
5	Lincoln Brigade	9	0	9	42	110	-68	0

=== Limited schedule ===
Place	Team	GP	W	L	GF	GA	GD	Points
1	Western Massachusetts Twisters	3	0	3	6	33	-27	0
2	Delaware Wizards	2	0	2	4	20	-16	0
3	Virginia Kickers	1	0	1	3	20	-17	0

== Final ==
March 8, 1998
8:00 PM (EST)

Baltimore Bays (MD)	11-4	Tulsa Roughnecks (OK)
Joe Koziol 11'; Danny Santoro; Billy Ronson; Mike Barger; Eric McClellan; Joe Koziol; Danny Santoro; Jason Dieter	(Report)	29' Justin Elkington

Du Burns Arena, Baltimore, Maryland

MVP: David Santoro

=== Points leaders ===
Rank	Scorer	Club	Goals	Assists	Points
1	Billy Ronson	Baltimore Bays	11	26	50
1	Keith DeFini	Omaha Flames			50

== Honors ==
- Coach of the Year: Kevin Healey
- Defender of the Year: Mike Barger
- Goalkeeper of the Year: Dave Tenney
