= Fort Worth FC =

- Full name: Fort Worth Football Club
- Founded: 1997
- Ground: Nolan Catholic HS Stadium
- Chairman: (United States) Jim Harris
- Manager: (Wales) Tarik Guendouzi (United States) Austin Hudson
- League: Women's Premier Soccer League
- 2008: 2nd, Big Sky South Division
Home colors	Away colors

Fort Worth FC is an American women's soccer team, founded in 1997. The team is a member of the Women's Premier Soccer League, the third tier of women's soccer in the United States and Canada. The team plays in the South Division of the Big Sky Conference.

The team plays its home games in the stadium on the campus of Nolan Catholic High School in Fort Worth, Texas. The team's colors are red, white and black.

== Players ==
=== Notable former players ===
The following former players have played at the senior international and/or professional level:

- (Canada) Charmaine Hooper

== Year-by-year ==
Year	Division	League	Reg. season	Points	Playoffs
2008	3	WPSL	2nd, Big Sky South	9	Did not qualify

== Coaches ==
- (Wales) Tarik Guendouzi 2008–present
- (United States) Austin Hudson 2008–present

== Stadia ==
- Stadium at Nolan Catholic High School, Fort Worth, Texas 2008–present
