= Colin Rocke =

Trinidad-American association football player

Personal information
- Date of birth: March 21, 1968 (age 58)
- Place of birth: Santa Cruz, Trinidad
- Height: 5 ft 8 in (1.73 m)
- Positions: Forward; defender

Youth career
- 1989–1993: West Virginia Wesleyan

Senior career*
Years	Team	Apps	(Gls)
1990–1991	El Paso Patriots		
1993	Dallas Sidekicks (indoor)	13	(5)
1994–1995	Las Vegas Dustdevils (indoor)	30	(17)
1995–1996	Dallas Lightning (indoor)	?	(11)
1997–1998	New Orleans Storm	51	(0)
1999	Charleston Battery	10	(0)
2003	New Orleans Shell Shockers	12	(0)
- * Club domestic league appearances and goals

Colin Rocke is a retired Trinidad-American association football forward who played professionally in the Continental Indoor Soccer League and USISL A-League.

== Player ==
Rocke attended West Virginia Wesleyan College where he played on the men’s soccer team from 1989 to 1993. In 1989 and 1990, West Virginia Wesleyan won the NAIA national men's soccer championship. Rocke was a three-time NAIA All American soccer player (1989, 1990 and 1992) as well as a conference champion track runner. He graduated in 1993. In 2012, West Virginia Wesleyan inducted Rocke into its Athletic Hall of Fame. In 1990 and 1991, Rocke played as an amateur for the El Paso Patriots of the USISL during the summer. In 1993, Rocke turned professional with the Dallas Sidekicks of the Continental Indoor Soccer League. The Sidekicks had selected Rocke in the third round (17th overall) of the 1993 CISL Amateur Draft. That season the Sidekicks won the CISL championship. In 1994, the Las Vegas Dustdevils selected Rocke in that year’s Expansion Draft. He spent two seasons in Las Vegas. Rocke won a second CISL championship in 1994 when the Dustdevils defeated the Sidekicks in three games. In the fall of 1995, Rocke joined the Dallas Lightning for the 1995-1996 USISL indoor season. He was the tenth leading scorer, but was injured and lost the 1996 season. In April 1997, Rocke returned to playing as he moved outdoors with the New Orleans Riverboat Gamblers of the USISL A-League. In 1998, the Gamblers were renamed the New Orleans Storm. On January 28, 1999, Rocke signed with the Charleston Battery, but by this time his playing career was winding down as he turned more towards coaching. Rocke returned to Louisiana where he had become the head coach of the Metairie Park Country Day School High School. In 2003, Rocke came out of retirement to briefly play for the New Orleans Shell Shockers of the USL Premier Development League.

== Coach ==
In 1998, Rocke became the head coach of the Metairie Park Country Day High School, a position he held until 2007. In 2000, he led his team to the Louisiana High School State championship. In 2002, they finished runner-up in the final. He was the 2000 Louisiana Division II Girls Coach of the Year.

== Honors ==
- NAIA All American: 1989, 1990, 1992
