= Memphis Express (soccer) =

- Full name: Memphis Express
- Nickname: The Express
- Founded: 2002
- Ground: Collierville HS Stadium
- Capacity: ????
- Chairman: Jeff Webb, Doug Marchant
- Manager: Toni Carbognani
- League: USL Premier Development League
- 2005: 7th, Mid South Division
| Home colours | Away colours |

Memphis Express (The Express) were an American soccer team, founded in 2002. The team was a member of the United Soccer Leagues Premier Development League (PDL), the fourth tier of the American Soccer Pyramid, until 2005, when the team left the league and the franchise was terminated.

The Express played their home games in the stadium on the grounds of Collierville High School in Collierville, Tennessee, 31 miles east of downtown Memphis. The team's colors were white, purple and black.

== Year-by-year ==
| Year | Division | League | Regular season | Playoffs | Open Cup |
|---|---|---|---|---|---|
| 2002 | 4 | USL PDL | 1st, Mid-South | Conference Semifinals | Second Round |
| 2003 | 4 | USL PDL | 2nd, Mid-South | National Semifinals | Did not qualify |
| 2004 | 4 | USL PDL | 3rd, Mid-South | Did not qualify | Did not qualify |
| 2005 | 4 | USL PDL | 7th, Mid-South | Did not qualify | Did not qualify |

== Honors ==
- USL PDL Southern Conference Champions 2003
- USL PDL Mid-South Division Champions 2002

== Coaches ==
- (Argentina) Toni Carbognani 2002–05

== Stadia ==
- Mike Rose Soccer Complex, Memphis, Tennessee 2003
- Stadium at Collierville High School, Collierville, Tennessee 2004–05

== Average attendance ==
- 2002: 1,107 (6th in PDL) Playoffs:NA
- 2003: 420 (19th in PDL)
- 2004: 229 (33rd in PDL)
- 2005: 195 (41st in PDL)
