= David Pfeil =

American soccer player

Personal information
- Date of birth: December 4, 1967 (age 58)
- Place of birth: Dallas, Texas, U.S.
- Height: 5 ft 10 in (1.78 m)
- Position: Midfielder

Youth career
- 1986–1990: SMU Mustangs

Senior career*
Years	Team	Apps	(Gls)
1991–1994	Dallas Rockets		
1991–1994	Dallas Sidekicks (indoor)	38	(7)

International career
- US U-20
- * Club domestic league appearances and goals

David Pfeil is an American retired soccer midfielder who played professionally in the USISL, Major Indoor Soccer League and Continental Indoor Soccer League. He was a member of the United States men's national under-20 soccer team at the 1987 FIFA World Youth Championship.

Pfeil graduated from Kimball High School where he was a four-year varsity soccer player. Pfeil attended Southern Methodist University, playing on the men's soccer team from 1986 to 1990.

In 1991, Pfeil joined the Dallas Rockets of the USISL. He played for them through 1994. In the fall of 1991, he signed with the Dallas Sidekicks of the Major Indoor Soccer League. The MISL collapsed at the end of the season and the Sidekicks moved to the Continental Indoor Soccer League. Pfeil continued to play for the Sidekicks in 1993 and 1994.

Pfeil played for the United States men's national under-20 soccer team at the 1987 FIFA World Youth Championship.
