= Memphis Storm =

American soccer team based in Memphis, Tennessee

The Memphis Storm was an American soccer team based in Memphis, Tennessee which existed from 1986 to 1994. They underwent several names changes including the Rogues, the Survivors, the United Express and finally the Jackals. They played in the American Indoor Soccer Association, and the Sunbelt Independent Soccer League, which later came to be known as the United States Interregional Soccer League.

== History ==
=== American Indoor Soccer Association ===
First founded in 1986 as a member of the American Indoor Soccer Association, the team, known as the Memphis Storm, playing in the Mid-South Coliseum, had a successful first season. It made the playoffs only to fall to eventual champions Louisville Thunder in the semifinals. Head coach Terry Nicholl was named the 1987 AISA Coach of the Year and defender Greg Willen was a First Team All Star. The Storm had an outstanding second season, topping the league standings. The league did not hold a post-season tournament so the Storm was declared the champion. Nichols repeated as AISA Coach of the Year. He won the award even though he left the team with several games remaining in the season, handing over the coaching duties to midfielder Tony Carbognani. Manny Sanchez was the Goalkeeper of the Year and Rod Castro was the Rookie of the Year. The Storm also placed Sanchez, defenders Vince Beck, Art Hughes and forward Ted Hantak on the All Star team. The Storm saw a collapse in form during the 1988–1989 season; finishing last in the league standings. During the season, the league took control of the team when the ownership expressed an intention of filing for bankruptcy. In September 1989, the league sold the team to new ownership, a group of Memphis businessmen. The new ownership renamed the team the Memphis Rogues after the old NASL team that had a degree of indoor success. Don Tobin replaced Carbognani as coach only to be relieved of his duties early in the season. Carbognani was again elevated to the position of player-coach. Despite the name and coaching changes, Memphis had a dismal season, finishing 6–34. The team also experienced considerable financial difficulties. By the summer of 1990, it owed the Mid-South Coliseum $21,000 in unpaid back rent. On June 23, 1990, the AISA expelled the team from the league and repudiated its line of credit. Team ownership under Rob Gunter began making arrangements to pay the team debt and move the team to the Southwest Independent Soccer League. In July 1990, the expansion Detroit Rockers of the AISA purchased all Memphis player contracts. On July 24, 1990, the Rogues paid the first installment of their franchise fee to the SISL, allowing the team to compete in that league during the upcoming season.

=== SISL/USISL ===
In July 1990, under the leadership of Rob Gunter and controlled by the Youth Educational Services an organization owned by Gunter, the team sent the Southwest Independent Soccer League $2,500 to enter the league. The team competed in the Shelby Farms Show Place Arena. In August, the league, now known as the Sunbelt Independent Soccer League, placed the Rogues in the Southwest Conference for the 1990-91 Sunbelt Independent Soccer League indoor season. The Rogues finished 8–12 and out of playoff contention. As the SISL played both indoor and outdoor seasons, the Rogues moved to Halle Stadium for their home games. During the 1991 outdoor season, the Rogues went 12–4 and topped the league with 98 points. They then won their first round series against the Atlanta Quicksilver. Having the best record in the league, the Rogues expected to play New Mexico Chiles in Memphis, but league commissioner Francisco Marcos moved the series to Albuquerque, New Mexico based on the higher number of spectators at Chiles games. The Rogues then withdrew from the playoffs in protest. This blow led to Gunter withdrawing as team owner. Dave Maybry, the team's director then began searching for team sponsorship to pay the bills. The team also moved its home games to the Memphis Sports Academy and renamed itself the Memphis Survivors. Despite its financial difficulties, the team finished the 1991–92 indoor season at 6–2 only to fall to the Atlanta Lightning in the first round of the playoffs. In the spring of 1992, team renamed itself the Memphis United Express for the upcoming outdoor season and moved its home games to the Christian Brothers University campus. The team went 8–6, in 1992 outdoor, again making the playoffs only to fall to the Atlanta Datagraphic Magic in the first round. The team did not enter the 1992–93 indoor season, but rejoined the USISL for the 1993 outdoor season under the sponsorship of the Memphis Futbol Club. The team, now known as the Memphis Jackals was coached by and played its home games at a number of facilities in the Memphis area. Memphis played one more season, the 1994 outdoor season, then withdrew from the USISL and ceased operations.

== Year-by-year ==
Year	Team Name	Division	League	Reg. season	Playoffs	Open Cup	Avg. Attendance
1986–87	Storm	2	AISA indoor	2nd, Southern	Semifinals	2	3,486
1987–88	Storm	2	AISA indoor	1st	5th in Challenge Cup	N/A	
1988–89	Storm	2	AISA indoor	7th	Did not qualify	N/A	2,048
1989–90	Rogues	2	AISA indoor	4th, American	Did not qualify	N/A	1,652
1990–91	Rogues	3	SISL indoor	6th, Southeast	Did not qualify	N/A	
1991	Rogues	3	SISL	1st, Southeast	Semifinals	Did not enter	
1991–92	Survivors	3	USISL indoor	2nd, Southeast	Playoffs	N/A	
1992	United Express	N/A	USISL	4th, Southeast	1st Round	Did not enter	
1992–93	United Express		USISL indoor	Did not play			
1993	Jackals	N/A	USISL	4th, Southeast	Divisional Semifinals	Did not enter	
1993–94	Jackals		USISL indoor	Did not play			
1994	Jackals	3	USISL	8th, Midsouth	Did not qualify	Did not enter	

== Coach ==
- Gary Hindley (1986)
- Terry Nicholl (1986–1988)
- Tony Carbognani (1988–1989)
- Dan Tobin (1989)
- Tony Carbognani (1989–1990)
- Damien Kelly (1990–1991)
- Tony Carbognani (1991–1992)
- Sepp Huber (1993)
