= Enrique Serrano (soccer) =

American soccer player and coach

Personal information
- Full name: Jorge Enrique Serrano
- Positions: Forward; midfielder

Senior career*
Years	Team	Apps	(Gls)
1989–1990	Albuquerque Gunners (indoor)		
1991–1992	Amarillo Challengers (indoor)		
1991–1994	New Mexico Chiles		
- * Club domestic league appearances and goals

Enrique Serrano is a retired American soccer player who coaches boys' high school soccer. He played professionally in the USISL and was the 1989-1990 SISL goal scoring leader.

During the 1989–90 Southwest Independent Soccer League season, Serrano led the league in scoring while playing for the Albuquerque Gunners top scorer In 1991, he joined the New Mexico Chiles where he played four outdoor seasons. He also spent the 1991-92 indoor season with the Amarillo Challengers.

In 1995, Serrano became the head coach of the La Cueva High School girls' team. He took the team to the 1995 and 1997 New Mexico State High School championship. In 2012, he became the head coach of the West Mesa High School girls' team.
