= Richie Richmond =

American soccer player

Personal information
- Full name: Richard Richmond
- Place of birth: United States
- Position: Midfielder

Youth career
- 1987–1990: Clemson Tigers

Senior career*
Years	Team	Apps	(Gls)
1991–1996	Atlanta Magic		
1996–1999	Atlanta Silverbacks		
- * Club domestic league appearances and goals

Richie Richmond is an American retired soccer midfielder who played professionally in the USISL and USL A-League. He was the 1993 USISL indoor MVP.

Richmond graduated from St. Pius X Catholic High School where he was part of the 1987 Georgia High School champion soccer team. He attended Clemson University and his freshman season, he scored the second Clemson goal as the Tigers won the 1987 NCAA Division I Men's Soccer Championship. After college, he joined the Atlanta Magic of the USISL. Richmond won three USISL indoor titles with the Magic and was the 1993 USISL Indoor MVP. In 1996, he ranked seventh on the league's points list. In 1996, the Magic folded and Richmond moved to the Atlanta Ruckus. In 1998 the Ruckus was renamed the Silverbacks. He finished his career in 1999. In addition to playing professional soccer, Richmond has worked for several telecommunications company including BellSouth and AT&T.
