= Chris Hellenkamp =

American soccer player (born 1961)

Personal information
- Date of birth: June 6, 1961 (age 65)
- Place of birth: Tacoma, Washington, United States
- Height: 5 ft 11 in (1.80 m)
- Position: Midfielder

College career
Years	Team	Apps	(Gls)
1979–1980	Seattle Pacific Falcons		

Senior career*
Years	Team	Apps	(Gls)
1981–1982	Portland Timbers	14	(0)
1981–1982	Portland Timbers (indoor)	9	(1)
1982–1983	San Diego Sockers (indoor)	1	(0)
1983–1984	Tacoma Stars (indoor)	6	(0)
1983–1984	Dallas Americans		
1985–1987	Louisville Thunder (indoor)	76	(63)
1987–1989	Fort Wayne Flames (indoor)	62	(30)
1988	Boston Bolts	?	(1)
1989–1991	Atlanta Attack (indoor)	59	(33)
1993–1996	Atlanta Magic (indoor)		
1994	Atlanta Magic		
1995	Milwaukee Wave (indoor)	4	(1)
1995	Atlanta Ruckus		
1997–1998	Atlanta Ruckus		

International career
1986–1987	U.S. Futsal		

Managerial career
- 1998: Atlanta Ruckus (assistant)
- 1998: Atlanta Ruckus
- * Club domestic league appearances and goals

Chris Hellenkamp (born June 6, 1961) is an American retired soccer midfielder who played professionally in the North American Soccer League and Major Indoor Soccer League.

== Career ==
Hellenkamp attended Seattle Pacific University where he played on the men's soccer team in 1979 and 1980. On December 17, 1980, the Portland Timbers selected Hellenkamp in the first round (ninth overall) of the North American Soccer League draft. He played for the Timbers for two years, including two outdoor and one indoor season. In 1982, he moved to the San Diego Sockers for the 1982–83 Major Indoor Soccer League season. In the spring of 1983, Hellenkamp had an unsuccessful trial with the Fort Lauderdale Strikers. He then signed with the Dallas Americans of the United Soccer League. He continued with the Americans in 1984, but the league folded six games into the season. In 1985, Hellenkamp joined the Louisville Thunder in the American Indoor Soccer Association, playing two seasons with the team. In 1987, he was First Team All League. In October 1987, Hellenkamp signed with the Fort Wayne Flames of the AISA. He was a 1988 All League midfielder with the Fort Wayne Flames. In the summer of 1988, Hellenkamp played for the Boston Bolts of the American Soccer League. In October 1989, he joined the Atlanta Attack of the AISA. He played the 1989–90 season with the Attack, was released just before the 1990–91 season in a payroll reduction effort before being signed again in December 1990 on a five-day contract. He continued with the Attack through the end of the season. Hellenkamp retire at the end of the season, but returned in the fall of 1992 when he joined the Atlanta Magic 1992–96 USISL. He also played for the Magic during the 1994 outdoor season. During his three years with the Magic, Hellenkamp won the 1993, 1994 and 1995 USISL indoor championships. In March 1995, the Milwaukee Wave of the National Professional Soccer League signed Hellenkamp for the playoffs. That spring, he joined the expansion Atlanta Ruckus of the A-League. The team did not bring him back for the 1996 or 1997 seasons, but in August 1997, the Ruckus signed Hellenkamp at the end of the season after several injuries decimated the team. He remained with the Ruckus through the 1997 and into the 1998 season. In 1998, he also served as an assistant coach. He briefly served as interim head coach after David Eristavi was fired in August 1998.

In 1986 and 1987, Hellenkamp played for the United States national futsal team.
