= Daniel Gonzalez (goalkeeper) =

Argentinian footballer and coach

Daniel González
Personal information
- Full name: Daniel Alejandro González
- Place of birth: Rosario, Argentina
- Position: Goalkeeper

Senior career*
Years	Team	Apps	(Gls)
1975–1979	Colegio La Salle Rosario		
1979–1981	Rosario Central		
1982–1983	Fort Lauderdale Strikers	0	(0)
1988–1989	Memphis Storm (indoor)		
1989–1990	Canton Invaders (indoor)		
1990–1996	Memphis Rouges (indoor)		

Managerial career
- 1989–1990: Canton Invaders
- 1998–1999: Colorado Rapids (assistant)
- 2010–: Chivas USA (assistant)
- * Club domestic league appearances and goals

Daniel González is a retired Argentine association football goalkeeper who played professionally in Argentina and the United States. He is the goalkeeper coach for Los Angeles Galaxy II, the reserve team for Major League Soccer's Los Angeles Galaxy

== Player ==
In 1975, González began playing with Colegio La Salle Rosario, an Argentinian club composed of students and alumni of La Salle Rosario. In 1979, he turned professional with Rosario Central. In 1982, González moved to the United States to sign with the Fort Lauderdale Strikers of the North American Soccer League where he served as an unused backup in league games. In 1988, he joined the Memphis Storm of the American Indoor Soccer Association. In 1989, he moved to the Canton Invaders. During the 1989–1990 season, he served as a player-coach with the Invaders. He then returned to Memphis, now known as the Memphis Rogues and playing in the USISL. He remained with Memphis until his retirement in 1996. At that time, the team was known as the Jackals. 1998-1999 Colorado Rapids (assistant)

== Coach ==
González served as the goalkeeper coach for the Colorado Rapids of Major League Soccer in 1998 and 1999. On January 26, 2001, the Rapids fired Gonzalez. He then coached in various youth clubs before joining Chivas USA as its goalkeeper coach on January 24, 2010. Gonzalez is now a coach for both the Men's and Women's soccer teams at Cal State University Dominguez Hills.
