= Oklahoma City Alliance =

Oklahoma City Alliance were a soccer club based in Oklahoma City, Oklahoma that competed in the USISL.

For the 1997/98 season, the team was renamed the Oklahoma City Warriors.

== Year-by-year ==
Year	Division	League	Reg. season	Playoffs	Open Cup
1996/97	N/A	I-League	3rd, West	Did not qualify	N/A
1997/98	N/A	I-League	4th, West	Did not qualify	N/A
