= Waco Kickers =

American soccer club

The Waco Kickers were an American soccer club owned by Dr. Albert F. Mikulencak based in Waco, Texas that competed in the SISL. Following the 1990 outdoor season, the merged into North Texas United.

== Year-by-year ==
Year	Division	League	Reg. season	Playoffs	Open Cup
1989/90	N/A	SISL Indoor	3rd, Texas	Did not qualify	N/A
1990	N/A	SISL	7th, Eastern	Did not qualify	Did not enter
