= Dallas Lightning =

American women's soccer club

The Dallas Lightning were a U.S. soccer club that competed in the USISL from 1993 to 1996 and the USISL W-League from 1995 to 1997. The men's team folded after the 1995–96 USISL indoor season and the women's team folded after the 1997 USISL W-League season.

Based in Tyler, Texas, the club originally started as the Texas Umeme Lightning. The team quickly changed its name to the Tyler Lightning and became the Texas Lightning upon their move to Dallas, Texas for the 1993/94 indoor season. They were renamed the Dallas Lightning for the 1995/96 indoor season.

== Year-by-year ==
Year	Division	League	Reg. season	Playoffs	Open Cup
1993	N/A	USISL	7th, South Central	Did not qualify	Did not enter
1993/94	N/A	USISL Indoor	2nd, South Central	Did not qualify	N/A
1994	3	USISL	4th, South Central	Sizzling Six	Midweek Challenge
1994/95	N/A	USISL Indoor	Did not play		
1995	3	USISL Pro League	6th, South Central	Did not qualify	Did not qualify
1995/96	N/A	USISL Indoor	1st, Central	Sizzlin' Five	N/A
