= Atlanta Express =

Soccer club based in Atlanta, Georgia

The Atlanta Express was a soccer club based in Atlanta, Georgia that competed in the SISL.

Following the 1991 outdoor season, the team became the Gwinnett County Steamers.

== Year-by-year ==
Year	Division	League	Reg. season	Playoffs	Open Cup
1990/91	N/A	SISL Indoor	5th, Southeast	Did not qualify	N/A
1991	N/A	SISL	5th, Southeast	Did not qualify	Did not enter
1992	N/A	USISL	7th, Southeast	Did not qualify	Did not enter
