= DFW Tornados =

- Full name: Dallas-Fort Worth Tornados
- Nickname: The Tornados
- Founded: 1986
- Dissolved: 2010
- Ground: Pizza Hut Park; Frisco, Texas
- Capacity: 21,193
- Owner: (United States) Jim Mertz
- Head Coach: (United States) Paul Robinson
- League: USL Premier Development League
- 2010: 3rd, Mid South; Playoffs: DNQ
Home colors	Away colors

DFW Tornados (also known as Dallas–Fort Worth Tornados) was an American soccer team based in Dallas, Texas, United States. Founded in 1986, the team played in the USL Premier Development League (PDL), the fourth tier of the American Soccer Pyramid, in the Mid South Division of the Southern Conference. The franchise folded at the end of the 2010 season and left the league thereafter.

The team played its home games at Pizza Hut Park (the home of Major League Soccer's FC Dallas) in nearby Frisco, Texas. The team's colors were black, blue and white.

== History ==
In 1986, the club, known as Garland Genesis, based in Garland, Texas, became a founding member of the Southwest Indoor Soccer League. The team topped the standings during the 1986–1987 season before defeating the Lubbock Lazers in the championship game. The team moved to Addison, Texas in 1987 and changed their name to the Addison Arrows. They remained in Addison for two years. In 1989, the league added a summer outdoor season and Addison promptly went to the championship game, this time losing to the Colorado Comets. In 1989, owner Ken Mulhall sold the team. At the time, he also coached the Arrows. The new owner fired Mulhall as coach and named Billy Pettigrew as head coach. The team continued its excellent play during the 1989–1990 indoor season, defeating the Phoenix Hearts to take their second indoor championship. Following the completion of the indoor season, the team moved to the Dallas/Fort Worth are and was renamed North Texas United. In November 1990, they merged with the Waco Kickers and became the Fort Worth Kickers. After team owner Pat Parker was unable to gain financial backing for the team, it moved to Dallas and became the Dallas Kickers for the 1991/92 indoor season. The team was renamed the Dallas Americans before the 1992 outdoor season. They were renamed the Dallas/Fort Worth Toros in 1993, and remained as such until 1996, when they were renamed the Dallas Toros for the 1997 outdoor season. They became the Texas Toros in 1998, and the Texas Rattlers for the 2000 season. Upon their move to the Premier Development League for 2001 they changed their name, and were bought by the Texas Spurs, which they maintained until 2003, when the Spurs club sold the team to the owner of Arena Athletics in Euless, Texas. They finally took their current name, the DFW Tornados, beginning in 2004.

== Players ==
=== Final roster ===
This list is a historical record of the final group of players on the last Tornados roster for their final game in August 2010. Source:

Note: Flags indicate national team as defined under FIFA eligibility rules; some limited exceptions apply. Players may hold more than one non-FIFA nationality.

No.	Pos.	Nation	Player
1	GK	SVK	Maros Valko
2	DF	USA	Adriel Adibi
3	MF	ENG	Matthew Dinsmore
4	DF	USA	Taylor Nelson-Cook
5	MF	USA	Kevin White
6	MF	USA	Chris Ross
7	MF	USA	Bryce Taylor
8	FW	ENG	Gifton Noel-Williams
9	FW	BRA	Paulo da Silva
10	MF	USA	Derek Knutson
11	MF	SCO	Stephen Shirley
12	MF	USA	Aaron DeLoach
13	MF	USA	Gabriel Arredondo
14	MF	USA	Stephen Ambrose
15	DF	USA	Cory Miller
16	DF	USA	Lucas Joyner
17	FW	ENG	Luke Haidarovic

No.	Pos.	Nation	Player
18	DF	USA	Mackenzie Ward
19	DF	USA	Jared Lee
20	MF	ENG	Pierce Kiembi
21	MF	USA	David Kamali
22	FW	SCO	Jordan Murch
23	DF	USA	Sean Gordon
24	FW	BRA	Alex Ivo
25	DF	USA	Jonathan Boggus
26	FW	USA	Tuan Doan
27	FW	ENG	Sam Kennedy
31	GK	ENG	Michael Wood
—	MF	USA	Andres Cuero
—	FW	BRA	Arthur Ivo
—	DF	ENG	Dale Parker
—	MF	USA	Taylor Rice
—	DF	USA	Daniel Woolard
—	MF	AUS	Keegan Ziada

=== Notable former players ===
This list of notable former players comprises players who went on to play professional soccer after playing for the team in the Premier Development League, or those who previously played professionally before joining the team.

- (United States) Kyle Altman
- (United States) Kyle Brown
- (United States) Jeff Agoos
- (United States) John Hedlund
- (United States) Caesar Cervin
- (United States) Andres Cuero
- (United States) Chad Deering
- (United States) Hunter Freeman
- (Brazil) Bruno Guarda
- (United States) Stephen McCarthy
- (United States) Ryan Mirsky
- (Scotland) Jordan Murch
- (United States) Jay Needham
- (England) Gifton Noel-Williams
- (United States) Dane Saintus
- (United States) Shea Salinas
- (United States) Chad Smith
- (United States) T. J. Tomasso
- (United States) Jamie Watson
- (United States) Daniel Woolard

== Year-by-year ==
Year	Team Name	Division	League	Regular season	Playoffs	Open Cup
1986–87	Garland Genesis	3	SISL Indoor	1st	Champion	
1987–88	Arlington Arrows	3	SISL Indoor	4th	Semifinal	
1988–89	Addison Arrows	3	SISL Indoor	1st, North	Semifinals	
1989		6	SOSL	3rd	Final	Did not enter
1989–90		7	SISL Indoor	1st, Tex-Ark-Oma	Champion	
1990	North Texas United	6	SISL Outdoor	5th, Eastern	Did not qualify	Did not enter
1990–91	Fort Worth Kickers	7	SISL Indoor	3rd, Southeast	Semifinals	
1991		7	SISL	2nd, Tex-Oma	Semifinals	Did not enter
1991–92	Dallas Kickers	3	USISL Indoor	1st, Tex-Oma	Sizzling Four	
1992	Dallas Americans		USISL	3rd, South Central	Sizzling Six	Did not enter
1992–93			USISL Indoor	2nd, South Central	Sizzling Four	
1993	Dallas/Fort Worth Toros		USISL	3rd, South Central	Did not qualify	Did not enter
1994			USISL	2nd, South Central	Sizzling Nine	Did not enter
1995			USISL Pro League	2nd, South Central	Divisional Semifinals	Did not qualify
1995–96			USISL Indoor	5th, Central	Did not qualify	
1996			USISL Pro League	1st, Central	Sizzling Six	Did not qualify
1997	Dallas Toros	3	USISL D-3 Pro League	6th, South Central	Did not qualify	Did not qualify
1998	Texas Toros	3	USISL D-3 Pro League	2nd, South Central	Division Semifinals	Did not qualify
1999		3	USL D-3 Pro League	2nd, Western	Conference Finals	Did not qualify
2000	Texas Rattlers	3	USL D-3 Pro League	1st, Southern	Conference Quarterfinals	2nd Round
2001	Texas Spurs	4	USL PDL	1st, Mid South	Conference Semifinals	Did not qualify
2002	Texas Spurs	4	USL PDL	2nd, Mid South	Conference Semifinals	1st Round
2003	Texas Spurs	4	USL PDL	4th, Mid South	Did not qualify	Did not qualify
2004	DFW Tornados	4	USL PDL	2nd, Mid South	Conference Semifinals	2nd Round
2005	DFW Tornados	4	USL PDL	4th, Mid South	Did not qualify	Did not qualify
2006		4	USL PDL	2nd, Mid South	Did not qualify	Did not qualify
2007		4	USL PDL	3rd, Mid South	Did not qualify	Did not qualify
2008		4	USL PDL	6th, Mid South	Did not qualify	Did not qualify
2009		4	USL PDL	6th, Mid South	Did not qualify	Did not qualify
2010		4	USL PDL	3rd, Mid South	Did not qualify	1st Round

== New indoor team (2004–2012) ==
DFW Tornados played in the Premier Arena Soccer League in the South Central Division. The team played its home games at Arena Athletics in Euless, TX.

Year	Division	League	Reg. season	Playoffs
Winter 04/05	N/A	PASL Premier	N/A	Lost Final
Winter 05/06	South Central	PASL Premier	2nd	N/A
Winter 06/07	South Central	PASL Premier	1st	N/A
Winter 07/08	South Central	PASL Premier	3rd	N/A
Winter 08/09	South Central	PASL Premier	3rd	N/A
Winter 09/10	South Central	PASL Premier	3rd	N/A
Winter 10/11	South Central	PASL Premier	2nd	N/A
Summer 2012	South Central	PASL Premier	4th	N/A

== Honors ==
- USL PDL Mid South Division
  - Champions: 2001
- USL D-3 Pro League Southern Division
  - Champions: 2000
- USISL Pro League Central Division
  - Champions: 1996

== Head coaches ==
- (United States) Ken Muhall (1986–1989)
- (United States) Ken Billy Pettigrew (1989–1990)
- (United States) Caesar Cervin (1991)
- (United States) Ed Puskarich (1998, 2001–2003)
- (United States) Bernard Brodigan (2004)
- (United States) Paul Robinson (2005–2010)

== Stadia ==
- Pennington Field; Bedford, Texas (2004–2010)
- Pizza Hut Park; Frisco, Texas (2010)

== Average attendance ==
Attendance stats are calculated by averaging each team's self-reported home attendances from the historical match archive at

- 2005: 207
- 2006: 349
- 2007: 389
- 2008: 320
- 2009: 188
- 2010: 179
