= Colorado Comets =

American soccer club

- Founded: 1985
- Dissolved: 2003
- League: USISL USISL Premier Development Soccer League

The Colorado Comets were an American soccer club based in Denver, Colorado, founded in 1985 which later competed in the SISL and USISL.

== History ==
Founded by Ed Eid in 1985, the team began as an amateur club coached by Kelvin Norman. That year, they lost to the Mitre Eagles of Seattle, Washington, in the semifinals of the National Amateur Indoor Championship. In 1989, the Comets entered the Southwest Outdoor Soccer League, winning the championship that year. Eid coached the team, winning Coach of the Year honors and Norman was selected as the league MVP. In October 1989, Norman returned to the position of head coach. Despite winning three titles, the Comets began having financial difficulties in 1991. In February 1992, Norman announced that the team would withdraw from the league. The team reformed in 1998, playing in the USISL Premier Development Soccer League, a U.S. fourth division league. In 2000, they changed their name to the Denver Cougars and played three more years in the PDL. In 2003 the team folded and ceased operation.

== Year-by-year ==
Year	Division	League	Reg. season	Playoffs	Open Cup
1989	N/A	SISL	1st	Champion	Did not enter
1989/90	N/A	SISL Indoor	1st, Central	Semifinals	N/A
1990	N/A	SISL	2nd, Western	Champion (no final)	Did not enter
1990/91	N/A	SISL Indoor	3rd, Southwest	Champion	N/A
1991	N/A	SISL	3rd, Southwest	Quarterfinals	Did not enter
1991/92	N/A	USISL Indoor	2nd, Southwest	Playoffs	N/A
1998	N/A	USISL PDSL	1st, Central	First round	N/A
1999	N/A	USISL PDSL	3rd, Heartland	Did not qualify	N/A
2000	N/A	USISL PDSL	1st, Rocky Mountain	Quarterfinals	N/A

== Head coaches ==
- Kelvin Norman (1985–1989)
- Ed Eid (1989)
- Kelvin Norma (1989–1992)
- Marc Francis (1998–1999, 2000)
- Merv Johnson (1999–2000)
