= Arkansas Diamonds (soccer) =

- Founded: 1989
- Dissolved: 1995
- Ground: Scott Field, Little Rock, Arkansas
- Owner: Nigel Boulton
- League: SISL, USISL

The Arkansas Diamonds were a soccer club based in Little Rock, Arkansas that competed in the SISL and USISL. The team was first owned by Samir Haj, a youth club coach based in Fayetteville, Arkansas. The franchise struggled for funding as it first played outdoor at Scott Field in Little Rock and its indoor games on the road. The team also played ambassador for Arkansas by hosting Russian professional soccer team Nitsru Kishnev in 1989 and 1990 in a combination of indoor and outdoor international "friendlies". Several local players that grew up in the Arkansas soccer leagues played in the earlier years including David T. Jones, Brad Shock and Robb Fischer from the Westside Futbol Club. In 1992 the team took a hiatus as it looked for new ownership. Russellville, Arkansas businessman John Sandford came to the rescue in 1992/93 partnering with Soccer USA an indoor soccer center that was based in North Little Rock, Arkansas. The franchise reverted to the USISL and in 1994 competed as the Arkansas A's playing its games in Sherwood, Arkansas. The team was owned by the former Arkansas State Soccer Association's DOC Nigel Boulton and a small group of dedicated parents whose children played for the A's youth teams run by Boulton. Funding remained a serious problem and in 1995 the group sold the franchise rights to a Tennessee businessman but the team was never reborn in Arkansas or relocated elsewhere.

== Year-by-year ==
Year	Division	League	Reg. season	Playoffs	Open Cup
1989/90	N/A	SISL Indoor	4th, Tex-Ark-Oma	Did not qualify	N/A
1990	N/A	SISL	6th, Eastern	Did not qualify	Did not enter
1990/91	N/A	SISL Indoor	8th, Southeast	Did not qualify	N/A
1991	N/A	SISL	3rd, Southeast	Did not qualify	Did not enter
1991/92	N/A	USISL Indoor	5th, Southeast	Did not qualify	N/A
1992	N/A	USISL	6th, South Central	Did not qualify	Did not enter
1993	On hiatus				
1994	3	USISL	6th, Midsouth	Did not qualify	Did not enter
1995	"4"	USISL Premier	8th, Central	Did not qualify	Did not enter
