= Tulsa Renegades =

Soccer club in Oklahoma

The Tulsa Renegades were a soccer club based in Tulsa, Oklahoma that competed in the SISL and USISL.

== Year-by-year ==
Year	Division	League	Reg. season	Playoffs	Open Cup
1989	N/A	SISL	2nd	Semifinals	Did not enter
1989/90	N/A	SISL Indoor	2nd, Tex-Ark-Oma	1st Round	N/A
1990	N/A	SISL	1st, Eastern	Quarterfinals	Did not enter
1990/91	N/A	SISL Indoor	4th, Southeast	Quarterfinals	N/A
1991	N/A	SISL	3rd, Tex-Oma	Quarterfinals	Did not enter
1991/92	N/A	USISL Indoor	5th, Tex-Oma	Did not qualify	N/A
