= United Soccer League =

Organizer of soccer leagues in the United States

- Founded: 1986; 40 years ago
- Country: United States
- Confederation: CONCACAF
- Divisions: Men's; USL Premier; USL Championship; USL League One; USL League Two; Women's; USL Super League; USL W League
- Number of clubs: 182 (men's); 101 (women's)
- Level on pyramid: 1–4
- Domestic cup: U.S. Open Cup (men's)
- League cup: USL Cup (men's)
- Broadcasters: CBS/Paramount; ESPN
- Website: uslsoccer.com

The United Soccer League (USL) is an organizer of various professional and amateur soccer leagues in the United States league system. It currently organizes its Championship, League One, and League Two for men, its Super League and W League for women, and the USL Academy and USL Youth for youth players. It also organizes the USL Cup, a league cup competition for its professional men's clubs.

The USL began in 1986 as a men's indoor soccer minor league, before branching out into outdoor soccer in 1989. After rebranding as the United States Interregional Soccer League (USISL), it commenced a women's outdoor league (the W-League) and split its men's outdoor league into two pro and one amateur league over the course of 1995–96. Its top pro flight would merge with the American Professional Soccer League to become the A-League in 1997 – a decision influenced by the advent of Major League Soccer (MLS). Its indoor league folded in 1998. The USISL adopted the name United Soccer Leagues in 1999.

In 2011, a number of USL clubs broke away to form the North American Soccer League, necessitating the merger of its two pro leagues into one. The USL also took ownership of the Major Indoor Soccer League, though it and the W-League would fold by 2015. Despite these setbacks, the USL experienced growth in the late 2010s, leading to a split of the professional leagues back into two in 2019. It also revived the W League and established a pro women's league between 2022 and 2024. A third men's pro league, USL Premier, is currently being planned for a 2028 debut.

The Rochester Rhinos men's team and Pali Blues women's team are the most successful clubs in the USL, having won four championships each in its top flights. Two USL clubs, the Rochester Rhinos and the Richmond Kickers, have won the men's U.S. Open Cup. Seven men's clubs that played in the USL – the Seattle Sounders, Portland Timbers, Vancouver Whitecaps, Montreal Impact, Orlando City SC, FC Cincinnati, and Nashville SC – are now MLS franchises.

== History ==
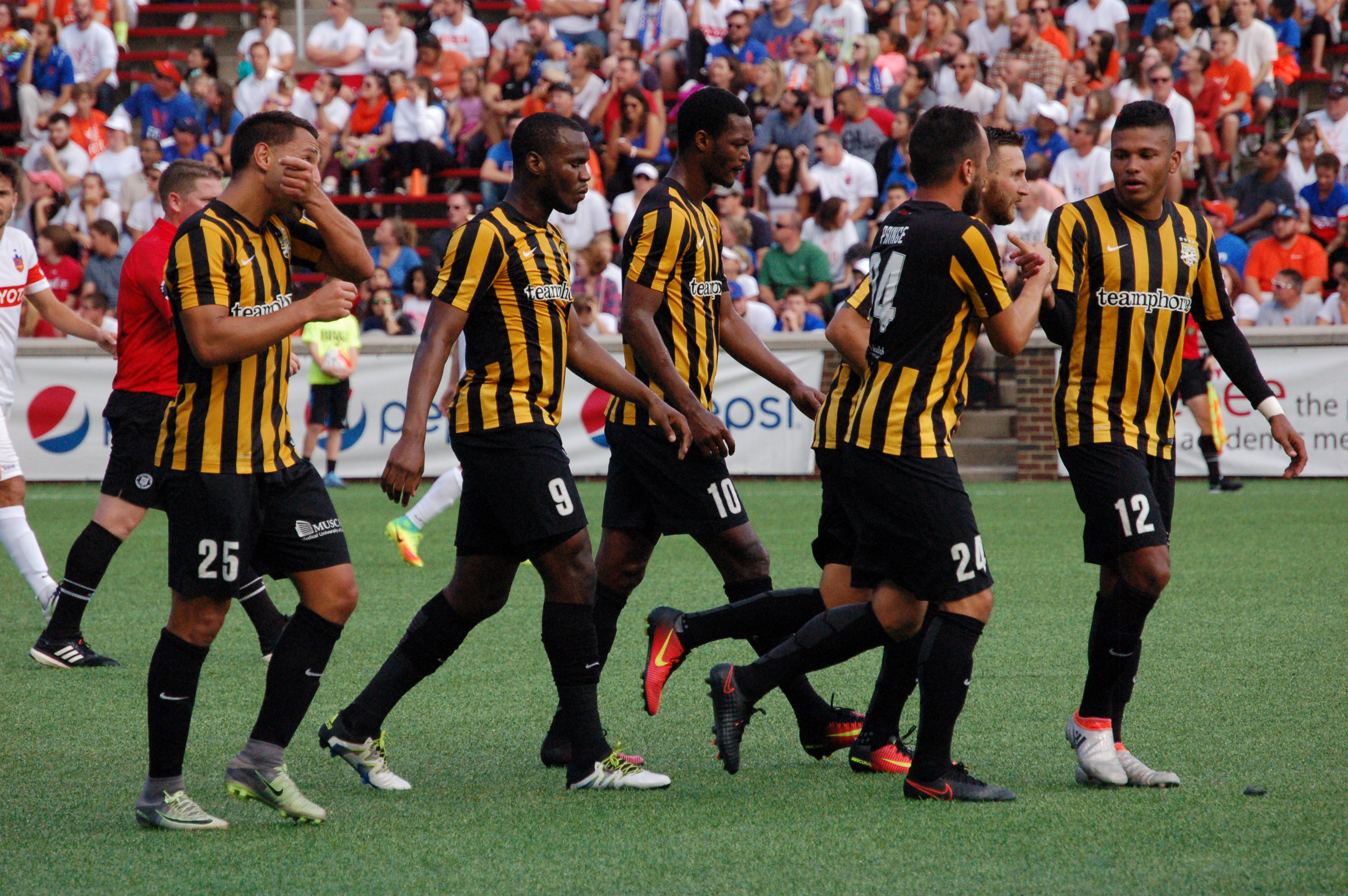
The Charleston Battery (pictured in 2016) are the oldest continuously professional club in US Soccer and the USL system, being a founding member of the USISL A-League in 1997.

The United Soccer League (USL) traces its roots to 1985 when Francisco Marcos founded the Southwest Indoor Soccer League. Initially intended as a minor indoor league associated with the Major Indoor Soccer League, it began with five teams owned by operators of indoor soccer arenas in the Southwest United States. By 1986, Marcos' own team, the Austin Sockadillos, joined the league, expanding it to six teams.

In 1989, the league shifted its focus beyond semi-professional indoor soccer. A press release from that year revealed ambitions to align with the United States Soccer Federation (USSF)'s plan to professionalize soccer in the lead-up to the 1994 FIFA World Cup. The league aimed to become part of a structured, three-tiered system envisioned by the USSF.

By 1990, the league began with their first outdoor soccer competitions, and rebranded as the Sunbelt Independent Soccer League, reflecting broader ambitions. Throughout the 1990s, the league underwent significant changes. This included splitting out an amateur Premier League in 1995 (renamed to the Premier Development League (PDL) in 1997), and the launch of their first attempt at a women's league. A merger with the American Professional Soccer League was completed in 1997 to form the USISL A-League (later named the USL First Division), solidifying its position in the U.S. soccer pyramid.

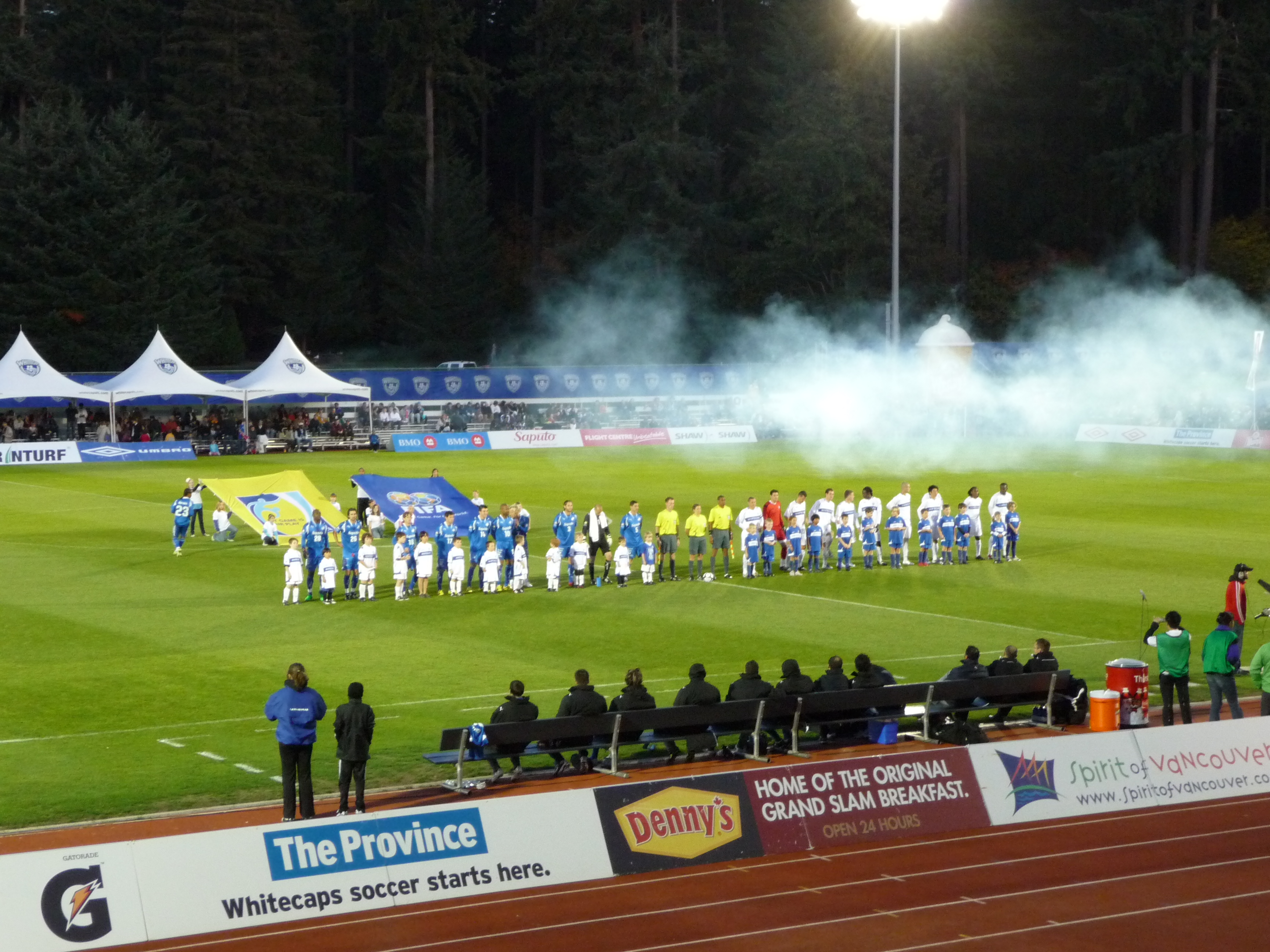
The 2009 USL First Division Championship, where both clubs who played, the Vancouver Whitecaps and Montreal Impact, left for different leagues.

In 2009, several USL First Division clubs expressed dissatisfaction with the league's leadership and structure, leading to a significant split. These clubs formed a breakaway competition called the North American Soccer League (NASL), which aimed to operate as a separate second division under the USSF. This division sparked disputes over sanctioning rights between the USL and the NASL. In response, the USSF organized a temporary combined league in 2010 before officially sanctioning the NASL as a separate entity.

In 2010, the USL unified its First Division and Second Division under the name USL Pro to consolidate its professional competitions, and moved down to the third division. In 2013, USL Pro and Major League Soccer (MLS) entered a partnership to integrate their competitions, enhancing player development and strengthening the league's professional status. The W-League folded in 2015. Second division sanctioning was once again granted by USSF in 2017. In 2019, the professional league rebranded to USL Championship, the PDL rebranded as USL League Two, and a new division three league named USL League One was launched.

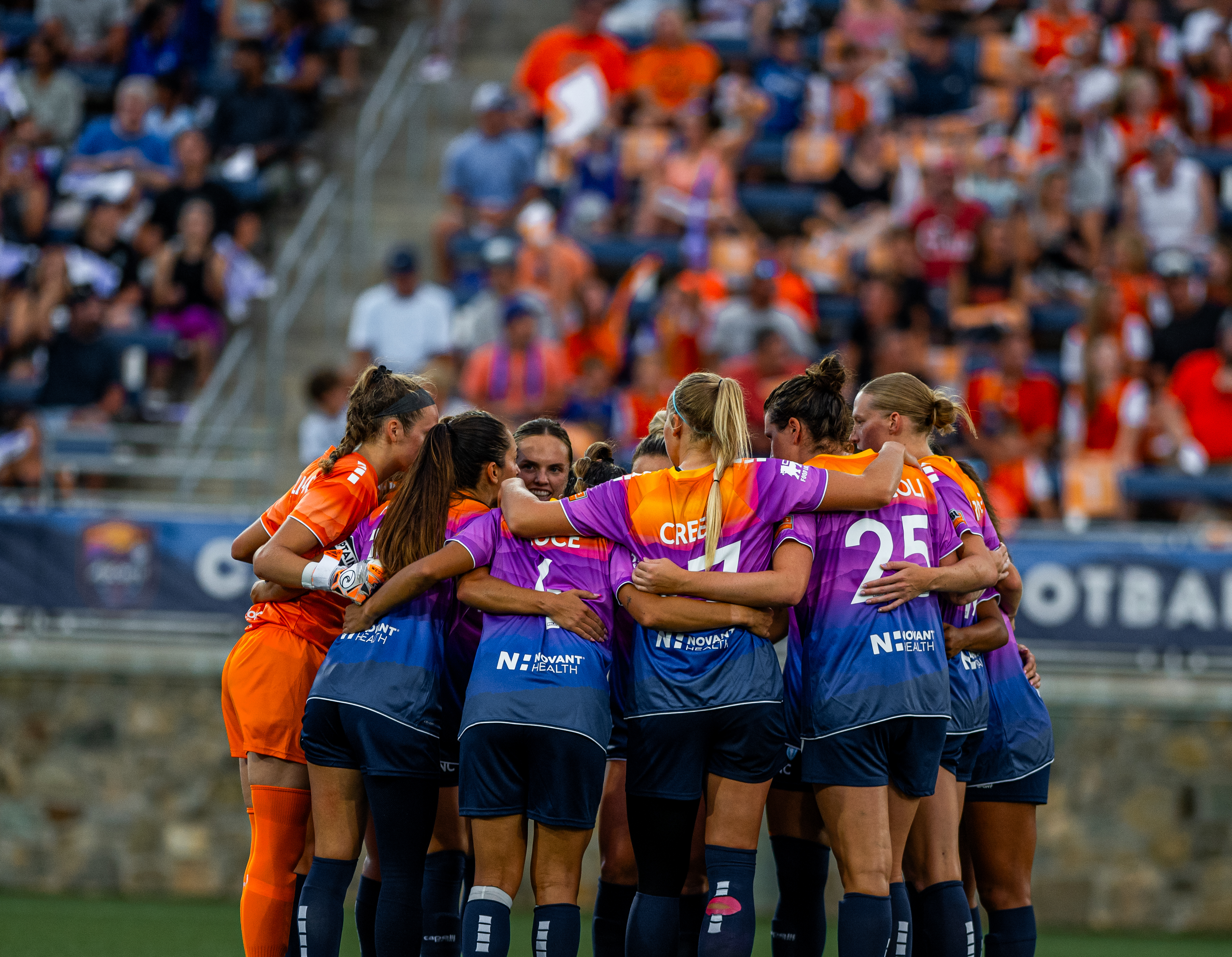
The USL significantly expanded into the women's game during the early 2020s, expanding into the amateur and professional leagues (Carolina Ascent FC pictured)

In recent years, the USL has expanded its reach significantly in the women's game. It reintroduced the W League in 2022 to support women's development and launched the USL Super League in 2024 as a Division I professional women's league alongside the National Women's Soccer League.

On February 13, 2025, the USL announced plans to launch a Division I league in 2027 that would exist apart from MLS, pending USSF approval. It also restated its desire to eventually introduce a promotion and relegation system like most other global soccer leagues. On March 19, 2025, USL announced that that club's owners had overwhelmingly passed a proposal to adopt promotion and relegation throughout all of the organization's professional leagues, including the upcoming Division I league. No timeline for the start of the process had been determined.

== Competitions ==
=== Men's competitions ===
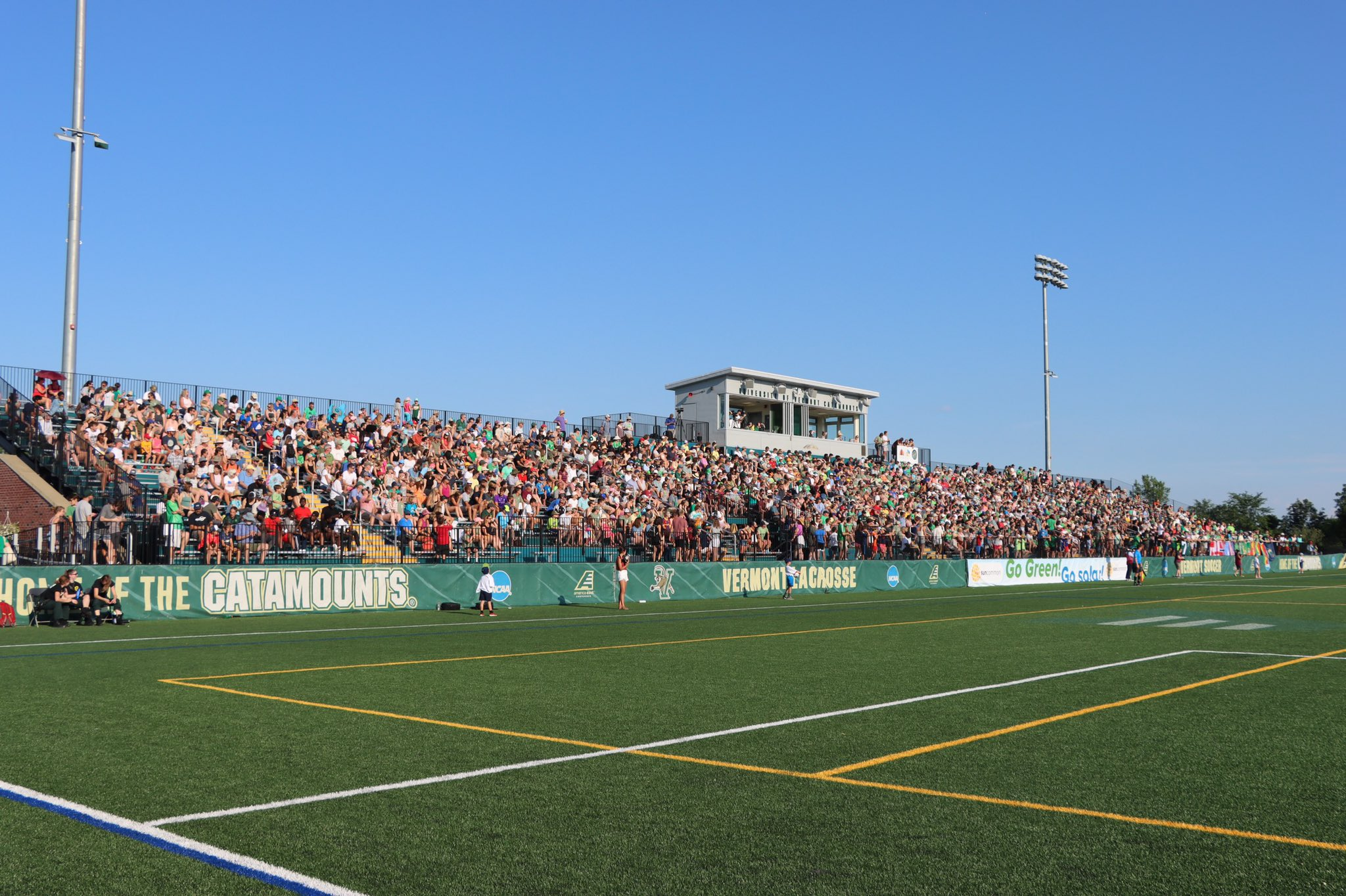
The USL has seen success organizing leagues both professional and amateur, with many amateur clubs (Vermont Green FC pictured) drawing in thousands of fans.

The USL operates three divisions within the U.S. soccer pyramid for men's professional and developmental teams:

- USL Championship: The second division of professional men's soccer in the United States, sanctioned by the United States Soccer Federation. It includes a regular season and playoffs to determine the league champion.
- USL League One: One of two third-division leagues of professional men's soccer, launched in 2019 to focus on smaller markets and player development. It also features a regular season and playoffs.
- USL League Two: A developmental league primarily for collegiate players aspiring to go professional. It operates during the summer and provides a platform for scouting and talent development.

=== Women's competitions ===
- USL Super League: A professional league launched in 2024, with joint top-tier status within women's soccer.
- USL W League: A pre-professional women's league reintroduced in 2022 to create a pathway for collegiate players and young talent.

=== Former competitions ===
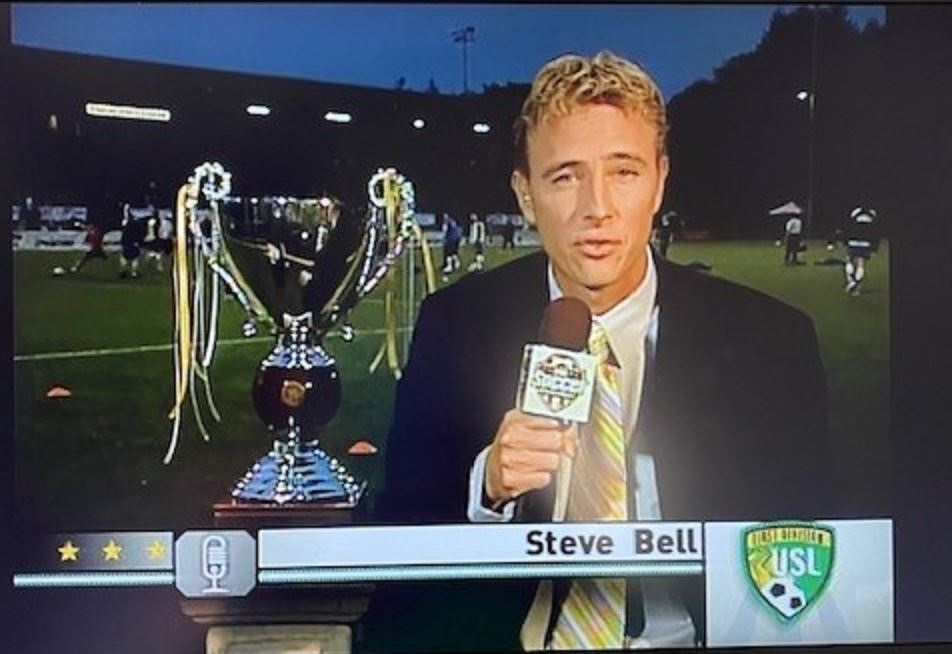
Steve Bell in 2008 with the original trophy given to the winners of the USL First Division.

The USL has a history of organizing leagues and competitions that have since evolved or ceased operations:

- USL First Division: The former top-tier league operated by the USL until 2010, when it was restructured into the USL Pro (now USL Championship).
- USL Second Division: Operated as a lower-level professional league until 2010, when its teams were absorbed into other USL leagues.
- Southwest Indoor Soccer League: The USL's original indoor competition, established in 1986. It provided a platform for amateur and semi-professional teams in the Southwest United States.
- Sunbelt Independent Soccer League (Indoor Division): After expanding into outdoor soccer in 1990, the league continued operating indoor divisions to maintain year-round competition. The indoor leagues were phased out as the organization shifted its focus to outdoor soccer in the 1990s.

These competitions show the evolution of the USL from its origins as an indoor soccer league to a modern, multi-tiered system supporting professional and developmental soccer across North America.

== Champions ==
†	Won the regular season championship
§	Won the U.S. Open Cup

=== Men's leagues ===
Year	Division 2		Division 3		Semi-pro	
Year	Div.	Champions	Div.	Champions	Div.	Champions
1989					SOSL	Colorado Comets †
1990					SISL	Colorado Comets (2)
1991					SISL	Richardson Rockets
1992					USISL	Palo Alto Firebirds
1993					USISL	Greensboro Dynamo
1994			USISL	Greensboro Dynamo		
1995			Pro	Long Island Rough Riders	Premier	Richmond Kickers §
1996	Select	California Jaguars	Pro	Charleston Battery	Premier	Central Coast Roadrunners
1997	AL	Milwaukee Rampage	D3 Pro	Albuquerque Geckos	PDSL	Central Coast Roadrunners (2)
1998	AL	Rochester Raging Rhinos †	D3 Pro	Chicago Stingers	PDSL	San Gabriel Valley Highlanders
1999	AL	Minnesota Thunder	D3 Pro	Western Mass Pioneers	PDL	Chicago Sockers
2000	AL	Rochester Raging Rhinos (2)	D3 Pro	Charlotte Eagles	PDL	Chicago Sockers (2)
2001	AL	Rochester Raging Rhinos (3)	D3 Pro	Utah Blitzz †	PDL	Westchester Flames
2002	AL	Milwaukee Rampage (2)	D3 Pro	Long Island Rough Riders (2)	PDL	Cape Cod Crusaders
2003	AL	Charleston Battery	Pro	Wilmington Hammerheads FC	PDL	Cape Cod Crusaders (2)
2004	AL	Montreal Impact	Pro	Utah Blitzz (2)	PDL	Central Florida Kraze
2005	USL1	Seattle Sounders	USL2	Charlotte Eagles (2)	PDL	Des Moines Menace
2006	USL1	Vancouver Whitecaps	USL2	Richmond Kickers †	PDL	Michigan Bucks
2007	USL1	Seattle Sounders (2) †	USL2	Harrisburg City Islanders	PDL	Laredo Heat
2008	USL1	Vancouver Whitecaps (2)	USL2	Cleveland City Stars	PDL	Thunder Bay Chill
2009	USL1	Montreal Impact (2)	USL2	Richmond Kickers (2)	PDL	Ventura County Fusion
2010	D2 Pro (Note: Six USL-affiliated teams participated in this temporary USSF-operated league.)	Puerto Rico Islanders	USL2	Charleston Battery (2) †	PDL	Portland Timbers U23s
2011			USL Pro	Orlando City SC †	PDL	Kitsap Pumas
2012			USL Pro	Charleston Battery (3)	PDL	Forest City London
2013			USL Pro	Orlando City SC (2)	PDL	Austin Aztex
2014			USL Pro	Sacramento Republic FC	PDL	Michigan Bucks (2)
2015			USL	Rochester Rhinos †	PDL	K–W United FC
2016			USL	New York Red Bulls II †	PDL	Michigan Bucks (3)
2017	USL	Louisville City FC			PDL	Charlotte Eagles
2018	USL	Louisville City FC (2)			PDL	Calgary Foothills FC
2019	USLC	Real Monarchs	USL1	North Texas SC †	USL2	Flint City Bucks (4)
2020	USLC	Cancelled (Note: Season was cancelled before a champion could be determined, due to the COVID-19 pandemic in the United States.)	USL1	Greenville Triumph SC †	USL2	Cancelled
2021	USLC	Orange County SC	USL1	Union Omaha †	USL2	Des Moines Menace (2)
2022	USLC	San Antonio FC †	USL1	Tormenta FC	USL2	Ventura County Fusion (2)
2023	USLC	Phoenix Rising FC	USL1	North Carolina FC	USL2	Ballard FC
2024	USLC	Colorado Springs Switchbacks FC	USL1	Union Omaha (2) †	USL2	Seacoast United Phantoms
2025	USLC	Pittsburgh Riverhounds SC	USL1	One Knoxville SC †	USL2	Vermont Green FC
Year	Div.	Champions	Div.	Champions	Div.	Champions
Year	Division 2		Division 3		Semi-pro	

=== Women's leagues ===
1995–2015
Year	Semi-pro			
Year	Div.	Champions	Div.	Champions
1995	WL	Long Island Lady Riders †		
1996	WL	Maryland Pride		
1997	WL	Long Island Lady Riders (2)		
1998	WL1	Raleigh Wings	WL2	Fort Collins Force
1999	WL1	Raleigh Wings (2)	WL2	North Texas FC
2000	WL1	Chicago Cobras	WL2	Springfield Sirens
2001	WL1	Boston Renegades	WL2	Charlotte Lady Eagles
2002	WL	Boston Renegades (2)		
2003	WL	Hampton Roads Piranhas		
2004	WL	Vancouver Whitecaps		
2005	WL	New Jersey Wildcats		
2006	WL	Vancouver Whitecaps (2)		
2007	WL	Washington Freedom		
2008	WL	Pali Blues †		
2009	WL	Pali Blues (2)		
2010	WL	Buffalo Flash		
2011	WL	Atlanta Silverbacks Women		
2012	WL	Ottawa Fury		
2013	WL	Pali Blues (3)		
2014	WL	Los Angeles Blues (4)		
2015	WL	Washington Spirit Reserves		

2022–present
Year	Division 1		Semi-pro	
Year	Div.	Champions	Div.	Champions
2022			USLW	Tormenta FC
2023			USLW	Indy Eleven
2024			USLW	North Carolina Courage U23
2025	USLS	Tampa Bay Sun FC	USLW	Utah United
2026	USLS	Lexington SC †	USLW	

=== Indoor leagues ===
Year	Div.	Champions
1986–87	SISL	Garland Genesis †
1987–88	SISL	Oklahoma City Warriors †
1988–89	SISL	Lubbock Lazers
1989–90	SISL	Addison Arrows (2)
1990–91	SISL	Colorado Comets
1991–92	USISL	Oklahoma City Warriors (2)
1992–93	USISL	Atlanta Magic †
1993–94	USISL	Atlanta Magic (2)
1994–95	USISL	Atlanta Magic (3) †
1995–96	USISL	Baltimore Bays
1996–97	IL	Baltimore Bays (2) †
1997–98	IL	Baltimore Bays (3) †
2011–12	MISL	Milwaukee Wave
2012–13	MISL	Baltimore Blast †
2013–14	MISL	Missouri Comets

== Staff ==
- Alec Papadakis – chief executive officer
- Justin Papadakis – Chief operating officer and chief real estate officer
- Paul McDonough – President and chief soccer officer
