= New Mexico Chiles =

The New Mexico Chiles were an American soccer club established in 1990 which competed in the American Professional Soccer League. In 1991, the team merged with the New Mexico Roadrunners and moved to the USISL until its disestablishment in 1996.

== History ==
In 1986, the semi-professional Albuquerque Outlaws entered the newly established Southwest Indoor Soccer League. In 1987, the team became the Albuquerque Gunners. In 1989, the SISL and Gunners began playing both a summer outdoor as well as a winter indoor season. The team was renamed the New Mexico Roadrunners for the 1990/91 indoor season.

In 1990, the New Mexico Chiles were established as an expansion franchise in the American Professional Soccer League. Following the season, the ownership dissolved. Players and organizers then merged with the New Mexico Roadrunners. The new team took on the Chiles name and logo and competed in the USISL until it folded in 1996.

The legacy of semi-pro/pro soccer in Albuquerque and New Mexico would be revived with the birth of the Albuquerque Geckos, who would play in the USL D-3 Pro League in 1997, winning the championship, and jumping up to the USL A-League from 1998–1999.

== SISL/USISL ==
=== Year-by-year ===
Year	Division	League	Reg. season	Playoffs	Open Cup
1986/87	N/A	SISL Indoor	4th	Did not qualify	N/A
1987/88	N/A	SISL Indoor	2nd	Semifinals	N/A
1988/89	N/A	SISL Indoor	2nd, West	1st Round	N/A
1989	N/A	SISL	5th	Did not qualify	Did not enter
1989/90	N/A	SISL Indoor	3rd, Cactus	Did not qualify	N/A
1990	N/A	APSL	5th, Western	Did not qualify	Did not enter
1990/91	N/A	SISL Indoor	7th, Southwest	Quarterfinals	N/A
1991	N/A	SISL	1st, Southwest	Final	Semifinals
1992	N/A	USISL	2nd, Southwest	Round 1	2nd round
1993	N/A	USISL	4th, Southwest	Did not qualify	Did not enter
1994	3	USISL	7th, Southwest	Divisional Finals	Did not enter
1995	3	USISL Pro League	3rd, South Central	Sizzling Nine	Did not qualify
1996	3	USISL Select League	4th, Pacific	Did not qualify	
