= Dallas Rockets =

Texas soccer club

The Richardson Rockets were a soccer club based in Richardson, Texas, United States, a suburb of Dallas. The club originally started in the indoor SISL league. They became the North Texas Mid-Cities Flyers for the 1991/92 USISL indoor league and were renamed the Dallas Rockets beginning with the 1992 outdoor league.

Ron Higgins owned the Rockets in 1992. Phil Jones coached the team.

== Year-by-year ==
| Year | Division | League UISL | Reg. season | Playoffs | Open Cup |
|---|---|---|---|---|---|
| 1989/90 | N/A | SISL Indoor | 1st, Texas | Finals | N/A |
| 1990 | N/A | SISL | 4th, Eastern | Finals (game cancelled) | Did not enter |
| 1990/91 | N/A | SISL Indoor | 1st, Southeast | Quarterfinals | N/A |
| 1991 | N/A | SISL | 1st, Tex-Oma | Champion | 2nd place |
| 1991/92 | N/A | USISL Indoor | 3rd, Tex-Oma | Playoffs | N/A |
| 1992 | N/A | USISL | 1st, South Central | Round 1 | Semifinals |
| 1993 | N/A | USISL | 6th, South Central | Did not qualify | Quarterfinals |
| 1994 | 3 | USISL | 6th, South Central | Did not qualify | Quarterfinals |

== Honors ==
- U.S. Open Cup
  - Runner Up (1): 1991
- SI Soccer League (1): 1991
- Participations in CONCACAF Champions' Cup: 1992
