= Atlanta Magic =

- Founded: 1991
- Dissolved: 1996
- League: USISL

The Atlanta Magic were a soccer club that competed in the USISL from 1991 to 1996. The club originally started in 1991/92 in the indoor USISL league. They played in the 1992 USISL outdoor season as the Atlanta Datagraphic Magic, and the 1993 USISL outdoor season as the Atlanta Lasers. In 1995, they only played 2 games in the USISL Pro League, and they folded after the 1995/96 indoor season.

== Year-by-year ==
Year	Division	League	Reg. season	Playoffs	Open Cup
1991/92	N/A	USISL Indoor	1st, Southeast	Final	N/A
1992	N/A	USISL	3rd, Southeast	Sizzling Six	Did not enter
1992/93	N/A	USISL Indoor	1st, Southeast	Champion	N/A
1993	N/A	USISL	2nd, Southeast	Sizzling Six	Did not enter
1993/94	N/A	USISL Indoor	1st, Southeast	Champion	N/A
1994	3	USISL	2nd, Southeast	Divisional Finals	Did not enter
1994/95	N/A	USISL Indoor	1st, Mid-South	Champion	N/A
1995	3	USISL Pro League	withdrew after 2 games		Did not qualify
1995/96	N/A	USISL Indoor	1st, Southeast	Final	N/A
