= Oklahoma City Warriors =

American soccer club based in Oklahoma City, Oklahoma, from 1986 to 1993

The Oklahoma Warriors were a soccer club based in Oklahoma City, Oklahoma that competed in the SISL and USISL.

Founded in 1986 by head coach and owner Chico Villar, the Warriors played their home games at the Indoor Soccer Arena, owned by Villar. In February 1993, the Warriors merged with the Oklahoma City Spirit of the Lone Star Soccer Alliance to become the Oklahoma City Slickers for the 1993 outdoor season.

== Year-by-year ==
Year	Division	League	Reg. season	Playoffs	Open Cup
1986/87	N/A	SISL Indoor	3rd	Semifinal	N/A
1987/88	N/A	SISL Indoor	1st	Champion	N/A
1988/89	N/A	SISL Indoor	2nd, North	1st Round	N/A
1989	N/A	SISL	8th	Did not qualify	Did not enter
1989/90	N/A	SISL Indoor	3rd, Tex-Ark-Oma	Did not qualify	N/A
1990	N/A	SISL	8th, Eastern	Did not qualify	Did not enter
1990/91	N/A	SISL Indoor	2nd, Southeast	Finals	N/A
1991	N/A	SISL	5th, Tex-Oma	Did not qualify	Did not enter
1991/92	N/A	USISL Indoor	2nd, Tex-Oma	Champion	N/A
1992	N/A	USISL	2nd, South Central	Round 2	Did not enter
1992/93	N/A	USISL Indoor	1st, South Central	Sizzling Four	N/A
