= 1997 USISL D-3 Pro League =

USISL D-3 Pro League
- Season: 1997
- Champions: Albuquerque Geckos (1st Title)
- Regular Season title: Albuquerque Geckos (1st Title)
- Matches: 349
- Goals: 1,221 (3.5 per match)
- Best Player: (Jamaica) Orett Prendergast Florida Strikers
- Top goalscorer: (Jamaica) Orett Prendergast Florida Strikers (29 Goals)
- Best goalkeeper: (United States) J. J. Wozniak San Francisco Bay Seals

The 1997 USISL D-3 Pro League was the 11th season of third-division soccer in the United States, and was the first season of now-defunct USISL D-3 Pro League.

== New clubs ==
- Arizona Sahuaros
- Cleveland Caps
- Daytona Tigers
- Indiana Blast
- Los Angeles Fireballs
- Myrtle Beach Seadawgs
- South Jersey Barons
- Stanislaus County Cruisers
- Tallahassee Tempest
- Vermont Voltage

== League standings ==
Northeast Division
Pos	Team	Pld	W	SW	SL	L	GF	GA	GD	Pts
1	North Jersey Imperials	18	10	1	0	7	39	23	+16	31
2	Rhode Island Stingrays	18	10	1	1	6	32	25	+7	31
3	New Hampshire Phantoms	18	9	2	2	5	36	27	+9	29
4	Central Jersey Riptide	18	8	2	3	5	26	24	+2	26
5	Vermont Wanderers	18	6	1	1	10	21	39	−18	19
6	NYCD Alleycats	18	6	0	1	11	25	38	−13	18
7	Cape Cod Crusaders	18	4	1	0	13	19	32	−13	13

Source: rsssf.com

Mid-Atlantic Division
Pos	Team	Pld	W	SW	SL	L	GF	GA	GD	Pts
1	Reading Rage	18	13	1	0	4	46	22	+24	40
2	Philadelphia Freedom	18	10	1	0	7	29	32	−3	31
3	Baltimore Bays	18	8	0	2	8	30	34	−4	24
4	New Jersey Stallions	18	7	2	1	8	25	26	−1	23
5	Delaware Wizards	18	7	0	2	9	23	32	−9	21
6	South Jersey Barons	18	4	1	3	10	22	28	−6	13

Source: rsssf.com

South Atlantic Division
Pos	Team	Pld	W	SW	SL	L	GF	GA	GD	Pts
1	Myrtle Beach Seadawgs	18	14	1	0	3	40	19	+21	43
2	South Carolina Shamrocks	18	11	2	0	5	37	27	+10	35
3	Charlotte Eagles	18	10	2	1	5	38	21	+17	32
4	Florida Strikers	18	10	0	0	8	51	34	+17	30
5	Wilmington Hammerheads	18	8	1	1	8	37	24	+13	25
6	Mobile Revelers	18	4	0	0	14	25	54	−29	12
7	Daytona Tigers	18	3	0	1	14	14	61	−47	9

Source: rsssf.com

North Central Division
Pos	Team	Pld	W	SW	SL	L	GF	GA	GD	Pts
1	Chicago Stingers	18	12	1	0	5	32	19	+13	37
2	Indiana Blast	18	7	1	1	9	28	31	−3	22
3	Cleveland Caps	18	6	3	0	9	28	32	−4	21
4	Rockford Raptors	18	6	2	2	8	32	33	−1	20

Source: rsssf.com

South Central Division
Pos	Team	Pld	W	SW	SL	L	GF	GA	GD	Pts
1	Albuquerque Geckos	18	13	2	1	2	51	15	+36	41
2	Austin Lone Stars	18	11	1	0	6	38	28	+10	34
3	Houston Hurricanes	18	9	0	2	7	35	30	+5	27
4	Tulsa Roughnecks	18	9	0	0	9	36	40	−4	27
5	San Antonio Pumas	18	5	0	2	11	23	45	−22	15
6	Dallas Toros	18	2	0	0	16	22	53	−31	6

Source: rsssf.com
- Albuquerque gets a bye to the national semifinal as hosts.

West Division
Pos	Team	Pld	W	SW	SL	L	GF	GA	GD	Pts
1	San Francisco Bay Seals	18	13	2	0	3	41	16	+25	41
2	Sacramento Scorpions	18	11	0	0	7	39	36	+3	33
3	Chico Rooks	18	9	3	3	3	38	28	+10	30
4	San Fernando Valley Golden Eagles	18	9	2	0	7	30	31	−1	29
5	Stanislaus County Cruisers	18	8	0	3	7	31	27	+4	24
6	Arizona Sahuaros	18	6	1	1	10	39	40	−1	19
7	Hawaii Tsunamii	16	4	1	1	10	24	29	−5	13
8	Reno Rattlers	16	4	0	0	12	17	34	−17	12
9	Los Angeles Fireballs	18	3	0	2	13	22	40	−18	9

Source: rsssf.com

== Playoffs ==
=== Division Semi-finals ===
- Central Jersey defeated North Jersey 2–1 (SO)
- New Hampshire defeated Rhode Island 2–1 (OT)
- Baltimore defeated Philadelphia 2–1
- New Jersey defeated Reading, 2–1
- Myrtle Beach defeated Florida, 5–1
- Charlotte defeated South Carolina 3–2
- Indiana defeated Cleveland 3–2
- San Antonio defeated Austin, 4–2
- Houston defeated Tulsa, 4–1
- San Francisco Bay defeated San Fernando Valley, 5–0
- Chico defeated Sacramento, 6–1
August 2, 1997
7:30 PM CDT

Austin Lone Stars	2–4	San Antonio Pumas
Judd Willmann 30'; Gabe Jones 60'	Report	18' Omar Millan; 20' Alejandro Ojeda; 52' Americo Ayala; 57' Oscar Munoz

House Park, Austin, Texas
Attendance: 1,506

August 2, 1997

Houston Hurricanes	4–1	Tulsa Roughnecks
Gustavo Gongora 6'; Marco Palomino 32', 37', 38'	Report	37' (o.g.)

Butler Stadium, Houston, Texas

August 15, 1997
7:00 PM

Philadelphia Freedom	1–2	Baltimore Bays
		87:30' Dan Santoro

Marple Newtown High School, Newtown Square, Pennsylvania

August 15, 1997

Myrtle Beach Seadawgs	5–1	Florida Strikers
Ryan Walker 28'; Eric Schmitt 36'; Jeremy Eason		22:15' Rodolfo Orellana

Doug Shaw Memorial Stadium, Myrtle Beach, South Carolina

August 15, 1997

Sacramento Scorpions	1–6	Chico Rooks
Jeremy Sweet 33'	Report 2	12', 22' Jake Gwin; 90' Armando Ceja

Cosumnes River College, Sacramento, California
Attendance: 1,743

August 16, 1997
5:00 PM

North Jersey Imperials	0–1	Central Jersey Riptide
Penalties
Howard (penalty scored)	1–2	(penalty scored) DiCuollo

University Stadium, Teaneck, New Jersey

August 16, 1997

Rhode Island Stingrays	1–2 (OT)	New Hampshire Phantoms
Bjorn Hansen 16:47'	Report	0:23' Rich Fleming; (yellow card) 58' Willy Schweitzer; 94:21' Jamie Williams

Pierce Memorial Field, East Providence, Rhode Island
Attendance: 1,505

August 16, 1997

Reading Rage	1–2	New Jersey Stallions

Ray Buss Field, Fleetwood, Pennsylvania

August 16, 1997

Indiana Blast	3–2	Cleveland Caps
Mark Phillips 57'; Steve Weiger 59'; Dustin Swinehart 75'	Report	33' Freddie Smith; 48' Chad James

Kuntz Stadium, Indianapolis, Indiana
Attendance: 3,047

August 16, 1997
7:30 PM

South Carolina Shamrocks	2–3	Charlotte Eagles
David Mcmahon 5'; Nate Ormondt 50' (pen.)	Report	39' Jeremy Sorzano; 66' John Clare; 77:35' Joshua Farrar

Shamrock Stadium, Greer, South Carolina
Attendance: 1,700

August 16, 1997

San Francisco Bay Seals	5–0	San Fernando Valley Golden Eagles
Gallo; Simpson pen.'; Folan; Cowell

Boxer Stadium, San Francisco, California

=== Division Finals ===
- New Hampshire defeated Central Jersey, 2–0
- Baltimore defeated New Jersey, 3–0
- Charlotte defeated Myrtle Beach, 3–3 (SO)
- Indiana defeated Chicago, 1–0
- Houston defeated San Antonio, 2–0
- San Francisco defeated Chico, 2–0
South Central Division Championship
August 9, 1997

Houston Hurricanes	2–0	San Antonio Pumas
Gongora 59'; Palomino 84'	Report

Butler Stadium, Houston, Texas
Attendance: 3,560

South Atlantic Division Championship
August 22, 1997

Myrtle Beach Seadawgs	3–3 (a.e.t.)	Charlotte Eagles
Moore 36', 63'; Eason 68:40'		27', 51' Dakin; 59' Wellington
Penalties
Jones (penalty scored); Aponowicz (penalty missed); Walker (penalty missed); Richards (penalty missed); Bennett (penalty missed)	1–2	(penalty scored) McGlaughlin; (penalty missed) Farrar; (penalty scored) Wellington

Doug Shaw Memorial Stadium, Myrtle Beach, South Carolina
Attendance: 1,000

North Central Division Championship
August 22, 1997

Chicago Stingers	0–1	Indiana Blast
		88' Dustin Swinehart

Forest View Park, Arlington Heights, Illinois

West Division Championship
August 23, 1997
2:30 PM PDT

San Francisco Bay Seals	2–0	Chico Rooks
Shane Watkins; Troya Cowell

Witter Field, Berkeley, California

Northeast Division Championship
August 23, 1997
7:30 PM EDT

New Hampshire Phantoms	2–0	Central Jersey Riptide
Thomas Dempsey (yellow card) 9'; Ron Murphy 13'; Richard Flemming (yellow card) 35'; Jamie Williams 85'	Report 1 Report 2	(yellow card) 31' Radnessa; (yellow card) 71' Javier Velazquez; (yellow card) 85' Ideahl

Owl Stadium, Keene, New Hampshire
Attendance: 2,623

Mid-Atlantic Division Championship
August 23, 1997
7:30 PM EDT

Baltimore Bays	3–0	New Jersey Stallions
Matt Tirschman; Bill Wnek

UMBC Stadium, Catonsville, Maryland

=== Quarterfinals/Inter Region Finals ===
- San Francisco Bay defeated Houston, 3–0
- New Hampshire defeated Baltimore 1–0 (OT)
- Charlotte defeated Indiana, 6–0
West Region Final
August 30, 1997
2:30 PM PDT

San Francisco Bay Seals	3–0	Houston Hurricanes

Boxer Stadium, San Francisco, California

East Region Final
August 30, 1997

New Hampshire Phantoms	1–0 (OT)	Baltimore Bays
Donnelly (yellow card) 81'; Murphy 102'	Report

Owl Stadium, Keene, New Hampshire
Attendance: 2,830

Central Region Final
August 30, 1997
4:30 PM

Charlotte Eagles	6–0	Indiana Blast
Clare; Wellington; Dakin 9', 26'; Dresser

Charlotte Christian School, Charlotte, North Carolina

=== Semifinals ===
- Charlotte defeated San Francisco Bay, 4–2
- Albuquerque defeated New Hampshire 2–1 (OT)
September 5, 1997
6:00 PM

San Francisco Bay Seals	2–4	Charlotte Eagles
Shane Watkins 77'; Shani Simpson 85' (pen.)	Report	25', 61' Jamie Wellington; 81', 89' Keith Dakin

UNM Soccer Complex, Albuquerque, New Mexico
Attendance: 1,500

September 5, 1997
8:00 PM

Albuquerque Geckos	2–1 (OT)	New Hampshire Phantoms
Colin Cheshire 14'; Brad Moore 96'	Report	24' Jamie Williams

UNM Soccer Complex, Albuquerque, New Mexico
Attendance: 1,145

=== Third Place Match ===
September 7, 1997
1:30 PM

San Francisco Bay Seals	1–0	New Hampshire Phantoms
Geise 10:51'	Report

UNM Soccer Complex, Albuquerque, New Mexico
Attendance: 2,013

=== Championship ===
- Albuquerque defeated Charlotte, 4–1
USISL D-3 Pro League Championship Game
September 7, 1997

Albuquerque Geckos	4–1	Charlotte Eagles
Jake Joy 13'; Justin Head 44'; Steve Riddle 70'; Luis Labastida 77'	Report 1 Report 2	14' Jon Payne

UNM Soccer Complex, Albuquerque, New Mexico
Attendance: 2,013

== Honors ==
- Organization of the Year: Cleveland Caps
- Executive of the Year: Monika Suhnholz, Austin Lone Stars
- Fair Play Award: Charlotte Eagles
