= 1999 USL D3 Pro League =

USL D3 Pro League
- Season: 1999
- Champions: Western Mass Pioneers (1st Title)
- Regular Season title: South Jersey Barons (1st Title)
- Matches: 234
- Goals: 1,031 (4.41 per match)
- Best Player: (Nicaragua) Luis Orellana Chico Rooks
- Top goalscorer: (Nicaragua) Luis Orellana Chico Rooks (24 Goals)
- Best goalkeeper: (United States) Christopher Lewis Delaware Wizards

The 1999 USL D3 Pro League was the 13th season of third-division soccer in the United States, and was the third season of now-defunct USL D3 Pro League, and its first since the name change to United Soccer League.

== League standings ==
Northern Division
Pos	Team	Pld	W	SW	SL	L	GF	GA	GD	BP	Pts
1	South Jersey Barons	18	15	1	0	2	43	23	+20	10	72
2	Western Mass Pioneers	18	13	1	0	4	56	28	+28	10	64
3	New Hampshire Phantoms	18	13	0	0	5	48	27	+21	10	62
4	New Jersey Stallions	18	8	3	0	7	42	32	+10	8	46
5	Reading Rage	18	9	1	0	8	33	39	−6	7	45
6	Delaware Wizards	18	6	0	3	9	31	39	−8	8	35
7	Cape Cod Crusaders	18	7	0	2	9	33	29	+4	5	35
8	North Jersey Imperials	18	5	0	2	11	42	55	−13	6	28
9	Rhode Island Stingrays	18	5	0	3	10	38	45	−7	5	28

Updated to match(es) played on unknown. Source:

Atlantic Division
Pos	Team	Pld	W	SW	SL	L	GF	GA	GD	BP	Pts
1	Charlotte Eagles	18	13	1	0	4	43	23	+20	9	63
2	Wilmington Hammerheads	18	13	1	0	4	44	17	+27	5	59
3	Carolina Dynamo	18	11	1	0	6	43	31	+12	8	54
4	Northern Virginia Royals	18	10	0	1	7	33	36	−3	5	46
5	South Carolina Shamrocks	18	9	0	1	8	42	28	+14	7	44
6	Roanoke Wrath	18	8	2	0	8	37	40	−3	7	43
7	Myrtle Beach Seadawgs	18	4	0	1	13	27	38	−11	3	20
8	Eastern Shore Sharks	18	1	1	0	16	18	81	−63	2	8

Source: rsssf.com

Western Division
Pos	Team	Pld	W	SW	SL	L	GF	GA	GD	BP	Pts
1	Chico Rooks	18	15	0	1	2	53	20	+33	10	71
2	Texas Toros	18	13	1	2	2	54	21	+33	9	65
3	Arizona Sahuaros	18	13	0	0	5	54	30	+24	10	62
4	California Jaguars	18	11	2	0	5	54	31	+23	11	59
5	Austin Lone Stars	18	7	1	1	9	42	37	+5	8	39
6	Tulsa Roughnecks	18	7	0	0	11	34	53	−19	6	34
7	Los Angeles Fireballs	18	4	1	0	13	32	80	−48	5	23
8	Houston Hurricanes	18	4	1	2	11	30	58	−28	5	25
9	Stanislaus County Cruisers	18	1	3	3	11	25	47	−22	3	16

Source: rsssf.com

== Playoffs ==
=== First Round ===
- Northern Virginia defeated South Carolina, 2-1 (SO)
August 17, 1999
7:30 PM EDT

Northern Virginia Royals	2–1 (SO)	South Carolina Shamrocks

Annandale High School, Annandale, Virginia
August 21, 1999
7:30 PM EDT

Charlotte Eagles	4–0	Northern Virginia Royals
Jamie Wellington 19', 58'; Dustin Swinehart 55'; Donovan Francis	Report

Memorial Stadium, Charlotte, North Carolina
August 21, 1999
7:30 PM EDT

Western Mass Pioneers	4–0	Reading Rage
Rob Jachym 28'; Paul Wright	Report

Lusitano Stadium, Ludlow, Massachusetts
Attendance: 2,465 or 2,645
August 21, 1999
7:30 PM EDT

New Hampshire Phantoms	3–2	New Jersey Stallions
Ron Murphy 5', 88'; Anthony Buckley 88'	Report	35', 44' Julio Cesar Dos Santos

Singer Family Park, Manchester, New Hampshire
August 21, 1999
7:30 PM PDT

Chico Rooks	1–0 (SO) (a.e.t.)	Arizona Sahuaros
	Report
Penalties
Joe Munoz (penalty scored); Richard Weiszmann (penalty scored); Luis Orellana (penalty scored)	3–0

University Soccer Stadium, Chico, California
August 21, 1999
8:00 PM CDT

Texas Toros	8–4	Austin Lone Stars
Wilco Ravestijn 13'; Edilson DaSilva 31', 45'; Gabriel Gentile 35'; Edgar Hernandez 87'	Report	17' Iyoma Flemister; 18' Gabe Jones; 22' Marc Madeley

Old Panther Field, Duncanville, Texas
August 22, 1999
6:00 PM EDT

Wilmington Hammerheads	1–0 (OT)	Carolina Dynamo
Ryan Walker 93'	Report 1 Report 2

Legion Stadium, Wilmington, North Carolina
Attendance: 1,357

=== Division Championships ===
Atlantic Division Championship
August 28, 1999
7:30 PM EDT

Charlotte Eagles	3–2	Wilmington Hammerheads
Ryan Leib 38'; Steve Mott 51'	Report	79' Ryan Walker; 86' Chuck Panos

Eagle Field, Rock Hill, South Carolina
North Division Championship
August 28, 1999
7:30 PM EDT

Western Mass Pioneers	1–0 (OT)	New Hampshire Phantoms
Rob Jachym 97:38'	Report

Lusitano Stadium, Ludlow, Massachusetts
Attendance: 3,582
Referee: Gus St. Silva
Western Division Championship
August 28, 1999
8:00 PM EDT

Chico Rooks	3–2 (SO) (a.e.t.)	Texas Toros
Joe Munoz 54'; German Campos 90'	Report	41' Gabriel Gentile; 70' Jose Maria Bazan
Penalties
Joe Munoz (penalty scored); Richard Weiszmann (penalty scored)	2–1	(penalty missed) Edilson DaSilva

University Soccer Stadium, Chico, California
Attendance: 3,200 or 3,241

=== Semifinals ===
- Western Mass defeated Chico, 4-1.
- South Jersey defeated Charlotte, 3-2 (SO).
September 3, 1999
7:30 PM EDT

Western Mass Pioneers	4–1	Chico Rooks
Rob Jachym 12'; Ricardo Monje 51'; Paul Wright 63'; Paul Kelly 90' (pen.)	Report	87' Luis Orellana; (red card) 88' Leo Alvelais

Lusitano Stadium, Ludlow, Massachusetts
Attendance: 4,630
September 4, 1999
7:30 PM EDT

Charlotte Eagles	2–3	South Jersey Barons
Dustin Swinehart 36'; Jeff Johnson 49'	Report	65' Paul Zgalich; 90' Eric Chijioke
Penalties
Dustin Swinehart (penalty missed); Jeff Johnson (penalty missed); Brad McGlaughlin (penalty missed); Ryan Leib (penalty missed)	0–3	(penalty scored) Dan Mannella; (penalty scored) Craig Wicken; (penalty scored) Eric Chijioke; (penalty missed) Matt Miles

Providence High School, Charlotte, North Carolina
Attendance: 2,700

=== Final ===
- Western Mass. Defeated South Jersey, 2-1.

September 11, 1999

Western Mass Pioneers	2–1	South Jersey Barons
Paul Wright 47'; Rob Jachym 60'; Chris Legowski (yellow card) 74'; Luis Pérez (yellow card) 87'; Ricardo Monje (yellow card) 88'; Matt Denecour (yellow card) 89'	Report	(yellow card) 44' Paul Zgalich; (yellow card) 74' Darlington Agu; 81:32' Matt Brooks

Lusitano Stadium, Ludlow, Massachusetts
Attendance: 5,223
