= 2001 PDL season =

USL Premier Development League
- Season: 2001
- Champions: Westchester Flames (1st Title)
- Regular Season Champions: Calgary Storm (1st Title)
- Matches: 442
- Goals: 1,790 (4.05 per match)
- Best player: (United States) Beau Brown Lafayette Lightning
- Top goalscorer: (United States) Beau Brown Lafayette Lightning (21 goals)
- Best goalkeeper: (Canada) Lars Hirschfeld Calgary Storm

The 2001 USL Premier Development League season was the 7th PDL season. The season began in April 2001 and ended in August 2001.

Westchester Flames finished the season as national champions, beating Calgary Storm 3–1 in the PDL Championship game. Calgary Storm finished with the best regular season record in the league, winning 18 out of their 20 games, suffering no losses, and finishing with a +38 goal difference.

== Changes from the 2000 season ==
=== Name changes ===
- The Colorado Comets changed their name to the Denver Cougars.
- The Colorado Springs Stampede changed their name to the Colorado Springs Ascent
- The Dayton Gems changed their name to the Dayton Gemini.
- The Miami Tango changed their name to the Miami Strike Force.
- The Texas Rattlers (formerly of the USISL D-3 Pro League) changed their name to the Texas Spurs.
- The Twin Cities Tornado changed their name to the Twin Cities Phoenix.

=== New teams ===
11 teams were added for the season, including 8 expansion teams:

Team name	Metro area	Location	Previous affiliation
(Alberta) Calgary Storm	Calgary area	Calgary, AB	expansion
(Massachusetts) Cape Cod Crusaders	Cape Cod area	Hyannis, MA	from USISL D-3 Pro League
(Maryland) Chesapeake Dragons	Baltimore-Washington area	Germantown, MD	expansion
(Illinois) Chicago Eagles Select	Chicago area	Chicago, IL	expansion
(Illinois) Chicago Fire Reserves	Chicago area	Chicago, IL	expansion
(New Jersey) Jersey Falcons	North Jersey area	Jersey City, NJ	expansion
(British Columbia) Okanagan Predators	Okanagan Valley area	Kelowna, BC	expansion
(California) Orange County Blue Star	Orange County area	Irvine, CA	from A-League
Southern California Seahorses	Los Angeles Metro area	La Mirada, CA	expansion
Texas Spurs	Dallas-Fort Worth area	Bedford, TX	from USISL D-3 Pro League
(Texas) West Dallas Kings	Dallas-Fort Worth area	Dallas, TX	expansion

=== Went on hiatus ===
- The Wisconsin Rebels went on hiatus for the season, and would return in 2002.

=== Folded ===
11 teams folded before the season:

- Abbotsford 86ers Select
- Alabama Saints
- Broward County Wolfpack
- Central Jersey Riptide
- Chicago Sockers
- Lexington Bluegrass Bandits
- Nevada Zephyrs
- New Brunswick Brigade
- Rockford Raptors
- South Florida Future
- Willamette Valley Firebirds

== Standings ==
Legend
Division champion
Team qualified for playoff berth

=== Central Conference ===
==== Great Lakes Division ====
Pos	Team	Pld	W	L	T	GF	GA	GD	BP	Pts
1	Chicago Fire Reserves	20	15	4	1	49	18	+31	11	72
2	West Michigan Edge	20	13	7	0	50	42	+8	10	62
3	Mid-Michigan Bucks	20	10	9	1	43	46	−3	7	48
4	Indiana Invaders	19	9	9	1	37	41	−4	9	46 (Note: Dayton and Indiana had a game postponed and could not be rescheduled by season's end. Game in question was cancelled since it had no bearing on playoffs.)
5	Kalamazoo Kingdom	20	9	10	1	43	39	+4	6	43
6	Dayton Gemini	19	5	14	0	24	48	−24	3	23

==== Heartland Division ====
Pos	Team	Pld	W	L	T	GF	GA	GD	BP	Pts
1	Sioux Falls Spitfire	20	17	2	1	54	19	+35	9	78
2	Des Moines Menace	20	11	7	2	38	23	+15	6	52
3	Chicago Eagles Select	20	8	10	2	33	33	0	4	38
4	Thunder Bay Chill	20	6	13	1	26	48	−22	3	28
5	Twin Cities Phoenix	20	3	17	0	34	61	−27	3	15

==== Mid-South Division ====
Pos	Team	Pld	W	L	T	GF	GA	GD	BP	Pts
1	Texas Spurs	20	16	3	1	68	22	+46	12	77
2	Lafayette Lightning	20	13	5	2	50	49	+1	11	65
3	Louisiana Outlaws	20	7	12	1	40	56	−16	7	36
4	West Dallas Kings	20	6	14	0	33	49	−16	4	28

=== Eastern Conference ===
==== Northeast Division ====
Pos	Team	Pld	W	L	T	GF	GA	GD	BP	Pts
1	Westchester Flames	20	13	4	3	48	25	+23	10	65
2	Brooklyn Knights	19	12	6	1	48	27	+21	8	57 (Note: Both Brooklyn and New York had games against Chesapeake postponed and could not be rescheduled by season's end. Games in question were cancelled since they had no bearing on playoffs.)
3	Vermont Voltage	20	10	7	3	51	25	+26	8	51
4	New York Freedom	19	10	7	2	41	33	+8	8	50
5	North Jersey Imperials	20	10	7	3	42	40	+2	7	50
6	Cape Cod Crusaders	20	9	8	3	39	36	+3	5	44
7	Chesapeake Dragons	18	4	12	2	30	45	−15	4	22
8	Jersey Falcons	20	1	19	0	19	89	−70	2	6

==== Southeast Division ====
Pos	Team	Pld	W	L	T	GF	GA	GD	BP	Pts
1	Cocoa Expos	20	14	5	1	55	37	+18	9	66
2	Miami Strike Force	20	13	7	0	46	38	+8	8	60
3	Bradenton Academics	19	9	9	1	40	34	+6	6	43 (Note: Bradenton and Palm Beach had a game postponed and could not be rescheduled by season's end. Game in question was cancelled since it had no bearing on playoffs.)
4	Central Florida Kraze	20	8	11	1	37	36	+1	4	37
5	Tampa Bay Hawks	20	6	12	2	39	41	−2	6	32
6	Palm Beach Pumas	19	6	12	1	30	58	−28	4	29

=== Western Conference ===
==== Rocky Mountain Division ====
Pos	Team	Pld	W	L	T	GF	GA	GD	BP	Pts
1	Denver Cougars	20	15	4	1	63	28	+35	11	72
2	Boulder Nova	19	11	8	0	46	35	+11	10	54 (Note: Boulder, Colorado Springs, and Wichita all had games with Kansas City postponed and could not be rescheduled by season's end. Games in question were cancelled since they had no bearing on playoffs.)
3	Wichita Jets	19	7	12	0	29	52	−23	5	33
4	Colorado Springs Ascent	19	4	14	1	32	63	−31	6	23
5	Kansas City Brass	17	2	15	0	27	53	−26	4	12

==== Northwest Division ====
Pos	Team	Pld	W	L	T	GF	GA	GD	BP	Pts
1	Calgary Storm (R)	20	18	2	0	47	9	+38	8	80
2	Seattle Sounders Select	19	14	5	0	42	23	+19	7	63 (Note: Seattle and Yakima had a game postponed and could not be rescheduled by season's end. Game in question was cancelled since it had no bearing on playoffs.)
3	Spokane Shadow	20	12	8	0	42	31	+11	6	54
4	Cascade Surge	20	7	13	0	27	42	−15	3	31
5	Yakima Reds	19	5	13	1	20	44	−24	1	22
6	Okanagan Predators	20	2	17	1	18	47	−29	1	10

(R) Regular Season Champions

==== Southwest Division ====
Pos	Team	Pld	W	L	T	GF	GA	GD	BP	Pts
1	Orange County Blue Star	20	14	6	0	51	34	+17	10	66
2	Southern California Seahorses	20	13	6	1	56	30	+26	9	62
3	Central Coast Roadrunners	20	12	8	0	53	35	+18	8	56
4	San Fernando Valley Heroes	20	7	11	2	38	43	−5	5	35
5	San Gabriel Valley Highlanders	20	1	17	2	12	83	−71	1	7

== Playoffs ==
Conference Semifinals
NW	(Alberta) Calgary	2
SW	(California) Orange County	1
RM	(Colorado) Denver	1
WC	(Washington (state)) Seattle	3
HL	(South Dakota) Sioux Falls	3
WC	(Louisiana) Lafayette	1
MS	Texas	0
GL	(Illinois) Chicago	1
SE1	(Florida) Cocoa	3
NE2	(New York (state)) Brooklyn	2
NE1	(New York (state)) Westchester	2
SE2	(Florida) Miami	1

Conference Finals
H	(Iowa) Des Moines
bye
NW	(Alberta) Calgary	3
WC	(Washington (state)) Seattle	0
HL	(South Dakota) Sioux Falls	1
GL	(Illinois) Chicago	0
SE1	(Florida) Cocoa	1
NE1	(New York (state)) Westchester	3

National Semifinals
H	(Iowa) Des Moines	1
NW	(Alberta) Calgary	2
HL	(South Dakota) Sioux Falls	1
NE1	(New York (state)) Westchester	5

PDL Championship Game
NW	(Alberta) Calgary	1
NE1	(New York (state)) Westchester	3

=== Third place game ===
Third Place Game
H	(Iowa) Des Moines	0
HL	(South Dakota) Sioux Falls	1

=== Conference semifinals ===
July 27, 2001

(Colorado) Denver Cougars	1–3	(Washington (state)) Seattle Sounders Select

Santa Ana Stadium
Santa Ana, California
Attendance: 50 or 106

July 27, 2001

Orange County Blue Star	1–2	(Alberta) Calgary Storm
	Report	33' Damir Jesic; 68' (pen.) Mark McKenna

Santa Ana Stadium
Santa Ana, California
Attendance: 211 or 306

July 28, 2001
6:00 PM

(New York (state)) Westchester Flames	2–1	(Florida) Miami Strike Force
Jeff Matteo; Rocky Bojovic 53'	Report	46' Matlas Asorey

Cocoa Expo Sports Center
Cocoa, Florida
Attendance: 110

July 28, 2001
6:00 PM

Texas Spurs	0–1 (OT)	(Illinois) Chicago Fire Reserves
	Report	119' Jordan Smith

McEneaney Field
Sioux Falls, South Dakota
Attendance: 2,248

July 28, 2001
8:00 PM

(Florida) Cocoa Expos	3–2	(New York (state)) Brooklyn Knights
Jordy Broder; David Atkinson; Ivan Blount	Report

Cocoa Expo Sports Center
Cocoa, Florida
Attendance: 350

July 28, 2001
8:00 PM

(South Dakota) Sioux Falls Spitfire	3–1	(Louisiana) Lafayette Lightning
Fabio Eidelwein 27' (pen.); Matt Byers 57', 65'	Report	36' Glenn Benjamin

McEneaney Field
Sioux Falls, South Dakota
Attendance: 2,248

=== Conference Finals ===
July 28, 2001

(Alberta) Calgary Storm	3–0	(Washington (state)) Seattle Sounders Select
Mark McKenna 53'; Chris Lemire 68'; Felix Napuri 90'	Report

Santa Ana Stadium
Santa Ana, California
Attendance: 45 or 54

July 29, 2001
7:00 PM

(Florida) Cocoa Expos	1–3	(New York (state)) Westchester Flames
Robin Chan 41'	Report	39' Hector Navarrete; 49' Juan Gomez; 54' Radoslav Bojovic

Cocoa Expo Sports Center
Cocoa, Florida

July 29, 2001
7:30 PM

(South Dakota) Sioux Falls Spitfire	1–0	(Illinois) Chicago Fire Reserves
Fabio Eidelwein 18'	Report

McEneaney Field
Sioux Falls, South Dakota
Attendance: 1,826

=== National Semifinals ===
August 3, 2001
6:00 PM

(South Dakota) Sioux Falls Spitfire	1–5	(New York (state)) Westchester Flames
Robb Rolfing (75:42)		30' (73:28) Oliver Medina-Filgueira; 46', 76' Radoslav Bojovic; 60' Ive Grando

Cara McGrane Memorial Stadium
Des Moines, Iowa

August 3, 2001
8:00 PM

(Iowa) Des Moines Menace	1–2 (OT)	(Alberta) Calgary Storm
Barry Lavety 46'	Report	34' 96' Damir Jesic

Cara McGrane Memorial Stadium
Des Moines, Iowa
Attendance: 1,500

=== Third Place Match ===
August 4, 2001
4:30 PM

(Iowa) Des Moines Menace	0–1	(South Dakota) Sioux Falls Spitfire
	Report	58' Dan Watson

Cara McGrane Memorial Stadium
Des Moines, Iowa

=== PDL Championship Game ===
August 4, 2001
7:05 PM

(Alberta) Calgary Storm	1–3	(New York (state)) Westchester Flames
Chris Lemire 32'		11' Hector Navarette; 58', 77' Evaud Thompson

Cara McGrane Memorial Stadium
Des Moines, Iowa

Championship MVP: (Jamaica) Evaud Thompson Westchester Flames

== Awards ==
=== Year End Awards ===
Scoring Champion: (United States) Beau Brown (Lafayette Lightning) 46 Points (21 Goals, 4 Assists)
Golden Boot: (United States) Beau Brown (Lafayette Lightning) (21 Goals)
Assists Champion: (United States) Chris Veselka (Lafayette Lightning) (13 Assists)
GAA Champion: (Canada) Lars Hirschfeld (Calgary Storm) 0.46 GAA
MVP: (United States) Beau Brown (Lafayette Lightning)
Rookie of the Year: (United States) TJ Rolfing (Sioux Falls Spitfire)
Defender of the Year: (United States) Burch Wylie (Texas Spurs)
Goalkeeper of the Year: (Canada) Lars Hirschfeld (Calgary Storm)
Coach of the Year: (United States) Bret Hall (Chicago Fire Reserves)

=== All-League First Team ===
F: (United States) Beau Brown (LAF) (League MVP, Scoring Champion, and Golden Boot); (United States) James Farrell (VER) ; (United States) Luis González (MIA)
M: (Democratic Republic of the Congo) Patrick Shamu (TEX); (Argentina) Leo Peirano (IND); (United States) TJ Rolfing (SFS) (Rookie of the Year); (United States) Mike Mariscalco (KAL)
D: (United States) Burch Wylie (TEX) (Defender of the Year); (United States) Matt Bobo (CHI); (United States) Dustin Branan (TCP)
G: (Canada) Lars Hirschfeld (CAL) (Goalkeeper of the Year and GAA Champion)

=== All-League Second Team ===
F: (England) Paul Snape (MMB); (Armenia) Arshak Abyanli (SFV); (United States) Radoslav Bojovic (WES)
M: (United States) Anthony Maher (WME); (United States) David Atkinson (COA); (United States) Danny Risch (CCR); (United States) Chris Veselka (LAF) (Assists Champion)
D: (United States) Ryan Hammer (KAL); (Trinidad and Tobago) Roger Groome (CAS); (United States) Gary Sullivan (BRO)
G: (United States) Jeff Richey (SFS)

=== All-Tournament Team ===
F: (Scotland) Barry Lavety (DMM); (United States) Radoslav Bojovic (WES); (Jamaica) Evaud Thompson (WES) (Championship Game MVP)
M: (United States) Oliver Medina (WES); (Bosnia and Herzegovina) Damir Jesic (CAL); (United States) Dan Watson (SFS); (Canada) Nicolas Reyes (CAL)
D: (Mexico) Omar Chavez (WES); (Canada) Jamie Auvigne (CAL); (Ghana) John Fosu (SFS)
G: (Canada) Lars Hirschfeld (CAL)
