= Tornado (disambiguation) =

A tornado is a violent rotating column of air that touches the surface of the Earth.

Tornado may also refer to:

== Amusement rides ==
- Tornado (Adventureland), a wooden roller coaster in Altoona, Iowa, US
- Tornado (Coney Island), a 1920s hybrid rollercoaster in New York, US
- Tornado (Parque de Atracciones de Madrid), a steel coaster in Madrid, Spain
- Tornado (ProSlide ride), a type of water slide
- Tornado (Särkänniemi), an inverted steel roller coaster in Tampere, Finland
- Tornado (Wisdom ride), an amusement ride manufactured by Wisdom Industries Ltd
- Tornado, a steel sit down spinning coaster at Dyrehavsbakken, Denmark
- Tornado, a steel coaster in Scotland, UK manufactured by Pinfari

== Arts and entertainment ==
=== Characters ===
- Tornado (horse), sometimes spelled Toronado, Zorro's horse
- Terrible Tornado, a character from the web comic / manga series One Punch-Man

=== Film ===
- The Tornado (1917 film), an American short film by John Ford
- The Tornado (1924 film), an American silent drama directed by King Baggot
- Tornado (1943 film), an American film directed by William A. Berke
- Tornado (2025 film), a British thriller
- Tornado: The Last Blood, a 1983 Italian war film
- Tornado!, a 1996 television disaster film

=== Games ===
- Tornado (1993 video game), flight simulator game
- Tornado (2008 video game), Nintendo DS game
- Tornado (table football), a table football table

=== Literature ===
- Tornado (comics), a 1979 weekly British comic
- Tornado (novel), a 1996 children's book by Betsy Byars

=== Music ===
==== Groups ====
- The Tornados or The Tornadoes, a 1960s English instrumental band
- The Tornadoes, an American surf band 1960–2007

==== Albums ====
- Tornado (Little Big Town album) or the title song (see below), 2012
- Tornado (The Rainmakers album), 1988
- Tornado, by Mandoza, or the title song, 2002

==== Songs ====
- "Tornado" (Little Big Town song), 2012
- "Tornado" (Ayra Starr song), 2026
- "T.O.R.N.A.D.O.", by the Go! Team from Rolling Blackouts, 2011
- "Tornado", by Adema on Planets, 2005
- "Tornado", by Anttix, 2013
- "Tornado", by Firebeatz, 2015
- "Tornado", by Jay Chou on the album Jay, 2000
- "Tornado", by Sara Groves on All Right Here, 2002
- "Tornado", by Steve Aoki with Tiësto, 2011
- "The Tornado", by Owl City on Coco Moon, 2023

=== Television ===
- "Tornado" (Beavis and Butt-Head), an episode
- "Tornado" (Superstore), an episode
- "Tornado", a commercial for the Buick Rendezvous

== Brands and enterprises ==
- Tornados, a frozen snack food by Ruiz Foods

== Computing and technology ==
- Tornado (robot), a competitor on the UK television series Robot Wars
- Tornado (web server), software written in Python
- HTC Tornado, smartphone
- Tornado Cash, cryptocurrency tumbler

== Military ==
- 9A52-4 Tornado, a Russian multiple rocket launcher
  - Tornado-G, improved BM-21 Grad multiple rocket launcher
  - Tornado-U, improved BM-27 Uragan multiple rocket launcher
  - Tornado-S, improved BM-30 Smerch multiple rocket launcher
- BM-30 Smerch ("Tornado"), a Russian multiple rocket launcher
- Panavia Tornado, a Western strike fighter jet
- Tornado Company (Ukraine), disbanded with dishonour in 2015

== People ==
- Danie Brits (1965–2020), a South African professional wrestler who used to go by the ring name Tornado
- Ted Fujita (1920–1998), prominent severe storms researcher, referred to as Mr Tornado by associates and the media
- Tony Drago (born 1965), a snooker player nicknamed "The Tornado"
- Tony Tornado (born 1930), Brazilian actor and singer
- Tornado (wrestler) (born 1966), a South African professional wrestler
- Tornado Alicia Black (born 1998), a tennis player

== Places ==
- Tornado, West Virginia, a census-designated place, US

== Sports ==
=== Association football ===
- Niger Tornadoes F.C., soccer club based in Minna, Nigeria
- Tornados de Humacao, Puerto Rican football club
- Tornado Måløy FK, Norwegian football club
- Tulsa Tornados, former professional soccer team from Tulsa, Oklahoma
- Twin Cities Tornado, initial name of the defunct Twin Cities Phoenix team
- Wichita Tornado, a soccer club in Wichita, Kansas, US
- Xgħajra Tornadoes F.C., football club from Xgħajra, Malta

=== Basketball ===
- Tornado, the supporters of KK Zadar basketball club
- Nippon Tornadoes, Japanese basketball team
- Troon Tornadoes, Scottish basketball club

=== Ice hockey ===
- Huntsville Tornado, former professional ice hockey team
- Texas Tornado, a Junior-A hockey team in Frisco, Texas, US
- Tornado Luxembourg, an ice hockey team in Luxembourg City

=== Rugby ===
- Ballymore Tornadoes, former Australian rugby union football club
- Eastern Tornadoes, a New Zealand rugby league franchise
- Thornton Heath Tornadoes, junior Rugby League club based in Croydon, London

=== Other uses in sports ===
- Tornado (bull), a ProRodeo Hall of Fame and Bull Riding Hall of Fame bucking bull
- Golden Tornadoes, various sports teams of Geneva College
- Racine Legion/Tornadoes or Orange/Newark Tornadoes, now-defunct National Football League teams
- Tornado Kick, another name for the Jump inside kick martial arts move
- Worcester Tornadoes, a minor-league baseball club in Worcester, Massachusetts, US

== Transport ==
=== Aviation ===
- Airfer Tornado, a Spanish paramotor design
- Beardmore Tornado, a diesel airship engine fitted to the R101
- Hawker Tornado, an unsuccessful World War II single–seat British fighter aircraft
- North American B-45 Tornado, an American bomber aircraft
- Panavia Tornado, a family of modern, twin–engine military aircraft built in Italy, the UK and Germany
  - Panavia Tornado ADV or Panavia Tornado Air Defence Variant, an interceptor aircraft
- Partenavia Tornado, Italian, racing aircraft; only one built
- Titan Tornado, ultralight aircraft
- Vultee XP-68 Tornado, a proposed version of the XP-54 Swoose Goose
- Wright R-2160 Tornado, aircraft engine
- Tornado, a biplane from Sonic The Hedgehog

=== Maritime ===
- Tornado (sailboat), a high performance catamaran, formerly an Olympic sailing class
- HMS Tornado, World War I, Royal Navy R-class destroyer (1916)
- USCGC Tornado, US Coast Guard, Cyclone-class patrol ship. Formerly the US Navy, USS Tornado (PC-14)
- Spanish corvette Tornado
- Tornado (P-44), a Meteoro-class patrol ship

=== Rail ===
- Tornado, a GWR 3031 Class locomotive built for the Great Western Railway between 1891 and 1915
- Tornado, one of the GWR Iron Duke Class, later Rover Class, steam locomotives
- BR Standard Class 7 70022 Tornado, built at Crewe 1951, withdrawn 1967
- LNER Peppercorn Class A1 60163 Tornado, a new–build main line steam locomotive, built in the UK, that entered service in 2008
- South Devon Railway Tornado class, a class of broad-gauge, tank locomotive. In service 1854-1885

=== Road ===
- Tornado (car company), a British automobile manufacturer active in the late 1950s and early 1960s
- Tornado, one of several models of Benelli motorcycles (see List of Benelli motorcycles)
- Foton Tornado, a light-duty truck produced by Foton Motor
- Chevrolet Tornado, the name given to the light pickup Chevrolet Montana in countries such as Mexico
- FPV F6 Tornado, an automobile built in Australia by Ford Performance Vehicles from 2005 to 2008
- Tornado Fuel Saver, an after-market device claimed to improve fuel economy
- Jeep Tornado engine, an automobile engine built by Kaiser Jeep from 1962 to 1973

== See also ==
- Toronado (disambiguation)
- Tournado (disambiguation)
- Tournedo
