= Austin Lightning =

- Full name: Austin Lightning
- Nickname: The Lightning
- Founded: 2002
- Dissolved: 2007
- Ground: Tony Burger Center
- Capacity: 15,000
- Owner: Paul Bender (minority)
- Chairman: Pam Mimbela
- Manager: Jaime Mimbela
- Coach: Chris Veselka
- League: USL Premier Development League
- 2007: 7th, Mid South Division
Home colours	Away colours

Austin Lightning was an amateur American soccer team. The team was a member of the United Soccer Leagues Premier Development League (PDL), the fourth tier of the American Soccer Pyramid, until 2007, when the team left the league and the franchise was terminated.

== History ==
Austin Lightning was founded in 2001, originally with the name Lafayette Lightning. The team played as the Lafayette Lightning for the 2001 PDL season, finishing 2nd in the Mid-South Division. When the Austin Lone Stars were relegated from USL D3 Pro League in 2000 season and subsequently folded before the 2001 season started. Austin had no major soccer team in the city. This allowed the Lightning to transfer from Layfayette to Austin under the leadership of player/coach Chris Veselka. The team played their home games at St. Stephen's Episcopal School (Austin, Texas). After two years as the only team in town, Jonathan Langer was looking to bring a professional team back to town in the form of Austin Posse, but the team ceased operation after three exhibition games. The team played its home games for their final seasons at the Tony Burger Center in the city of Austin, Texas. The team dissolved in 2007 and were reborn as the Austin Stampede under some of the same management and with a new coach.

== Year-by-year ==
Year	Division	League	Regular season	Playoffs	Open Cup
2002	4	USL PDL	3rd, Mid South	Did not qualify	Did not qualify
2003	4	USL PDL	5th, Mid South	Did not qualify	Did not qualify
2004	4	USL PDL	7th, Mid South	Did not qualify	Did not qualify
2005	4	USL PDL	3rd, Mid South	Did not qualify	Did not qualify
2006	4	USL PDL	5th, Mid South	Did not qualify	Did not qualify
2007	4	USL PDL	7th, Mid South	Did not qualify	Did not qualify

== Coaches ==
- Chris Veselka 2001
- (Peru) Jaime Mimbela 2007

== Notable alumni ==
- Ismail Elfath

== Stadia ==
- Stadium at St. Stephen's Episcopal School, Austin, Texas 2003
- Stadium at Red Rock High School, Red Rock, Texas 2004
- Williamson County Regional Park, Leander, Texas 2003, 2005–06, 2007
- Noack Sports Complex, Austin, Texas 2005 (3 games)
- House Park, Austin, Texas 2005 (1 game), 2007
- Tony Burger Center, Austin, Texas 2007

== Average attendance ==
- 2002: 163 (28th in PDL)
- 2003: 244 (31st in PDL)
- 2004: 209 (39th in PDL)
- 2005: 197 (39th in PDL)
- 2006: 261 (37th in PDL)
- 2007: 282 (37th in PDL)

== See also ==
- Austin Thunder
- Austin Lone Stars
- Austin Aztex
- Austin Aztex U23
- Austin Bold FC
- Austin United FC
- Austin FC
- Austin FC II
