= 1997 Florida Strikers season =

Florida Strikers
1997 season
- USISL D-3 Pro League: South Atlantic Division: Fourth place
- D-3 Pro League playoffs: did not qualify
Home colors	Away colors

The 1997 Florida Strikers season was the second season of the new team in the United Systems of Independent Soccer Leagues, playing in the USISL D-3 Pro League. It was also the thirty-first season of the club in professional soccer. This year, the team finished in fourth place in the South Atlantic Division, and did not make the playoffs. This was the last year of the team as the club folded them at the end of the season. The club would join the Miami FC in 2011 to form the new Fort Lauderdale Strikers team.

== Competitions ==
=== USISL D-3 Pro League regular season ===
==== League standings ====
                          GP   W   SW  SL  L   GF  GA  Pts
	Northeast Division
North Jersey Imperials     18  10   1   0   7   39  23   31
Rhode Island Stingrays     18  10   1   1   6   32  25   31
New Hampshire Phantoms     18   9   2   2   5   36  27   29
Central Jersey Riptide     18   8   2   3   5   26  24   26
Vermont Wanderers          18   6   1   1  10   21  39   19
NYCD Alleycats           18   6   0   1  11   25  38   18
Cape Cod Crusaders         18   4   1   0  13   19  32   13

Mid-Atlantic Division

Reading Rage               18  13   1   0   4   46  22   40
Philadelphia Freedom       18  10   1   0   7   29  32   31
Baltimore Bays             18   8   0   2   8   30  34   24
New Jersey Stallions       18   7   2   1   8   25  26   23
Delaware Wizards           18   7   0   2   9   23  32   21
South Jersey Barons        18   4   1   3  10   22  28   13

South Atlantic Division

Myrtle Beach Seadawgs      18  14   1   0   3   40  19   43
South Carolina Shamrocks   18  11   2   0   5   37  27   35
Charlotte Eagles           18  10   2   1   5   38  21   32
Florida Strikers           18  10   0   0   8   51  34   30
Wilmington Hammerheads     18   8   1   1   8   37  24   25
Mobile Revelers            18   4   0   0  14   25  54   12
Daytona Tigers             18   3   0   1  14   14  61    9

North Central Division

Chicago Stingers           18  12   1   0   5   32  19   37
Indiana Blast              18   7   1   1   9   28  31   22
Cleveland Caps             18   6   3   0   9   28  32   21
Rockford Raptors           18   6   2   2   8   32  33   20

South Central Division

Albuquerque Geckos         18  13   2   1   2   51  15   41
Austin Lone Stars          18  11   1   0   6   38  28   34
Houston Hurricanes         18   9   0   2   7   35  30   27
Tulsa Roughnecks           18   9   0   0   9   36  40   27
San Antonio Pumas          18   5   0   2  11   23  45   15
Dallas Toros               18   2   0   0  16   22  53    6

- Albuquerque gets a bye to the national semifinal as hosts.

West Division

San Francisco Bay Seals    18  13   2   0   3   41  16   41
Sacramento Scorpions       18  11   0   0   7   39  36   33
Chico Rooks                18   9   3   3   3   38  28   30
San Fernando Valley Golden Eagles 18   9   2   0   7   30  31   29
Stanislaus County Cruisers 18   8   0   3   7   31  27   24
Arizona Sahuaros           18   6   1   1  10   39  40   19
Hawaii Tsunamii            16   4   1   1  10   24  29   13
Reno Rattlers              16   4   0   0  12   17  34   12
Los Angeles Fireballs      18   3   0   2  13   22  40    9
