= Myrtle Beach Seadawgs =

American soccer team

Myrtle Beach Seadawgs were an American soccer team that played in Myrtle Beach, South Carolina. Their home field was Doug Shaw Memorial Stadium.

The roster included Eric Schmitt, dai hughes, Jimmy May, Steven Kolacz ( U.S. Footballer), Willie Files, Ross Moore, Barry Hope, Miguel Calderón, Jeremy Eason, Neil Payne, Gerard Jones, Scott Schweitzer, Warren Russ, Dave Mallick, Michael Parry, Bradley Bennett, Greg Richards, Ryan Walker, Jeff Johnson, Pablo González, Joe Bowman.

In April 1997, the professional female golfer Laura Davies played six minutes for the club in a league game.

== Head coaches ==
- (Republic of Ireland) John Farrelly
- (England) David Irving
- Marcelo Neveleff 1999

== Year-by-year ==
Year	Division	League	Reg. season	Playoffs	Open Cup
1997	3	USISL D-3 Pro League	1st, South Atlantic	Division Finals	Did not qualify
1998	3	USISL D-3 Pro League	2nd, Atlantic	Division Finals	Did not qualify
1999	3	USL D-3 Pro League	7th, Atlantic	Did not qualify	Did not qualify
