= Chris Veselka =

American soccer forward (born 1970)

Personal information
- Full name: Christopher B. Veselka
- Date of birth: June 15, 1970 (age 56)
- Place of birth: United States
- Height: 5 ft 9 in (1.75 m)
- Position: Forward

Youth career
- 1990: Florida International University

Senior career*
Years	Team	Apps	(Gls)
1989–1991	Austin Sockadillos	23	(19)
1991–1994	TuS Celle		
1994	Austin Lone Stars	13	(30)
1995	San Antonio Pumas		
1995	Charleston Battery	14	(6)
1996–1997	Austin Lone Stars		
1998–1999	New Orleans Storm	36	(13)
1999	Austin Lone Stars	2	(0)
2001	Lafayette Lightning		
2003	Austin Lightning	5	(2)
2003	Lafayette Swamp Cats	4	(1)
- * Club domestic league appearances and goals

Chris Veselka (born June 15, 1970) was an American soccer forward who played professionally in the United States and Germany. He was the 1994 USISL leading scorer with 30 goals in 13 games.

Veselka spent one season, 1990, playing soccer at Florida International University. In the summer of 1989, he played for the Austin Sockadillos in the Southwest Independent Soccer League. Her returned for the 1990 season, scoring twelve goals in ten games. He placed second in the league in points. He returned to the Sockadillos for thirteen games in the 1991 summer season before moving to Germany to play for TuS Celle. He remained with TuS Celle until 1994 when he returned to the United States to sign with the Austin Lone Stars of USISL. He led the league in scoring with 30 goals in thirteen games. In 1995, he began the season with the San Antonio Pumas before moving to the Charleston Battery for the second half of the season. While he only scored six goals, he set the team record for single season assists with ten. In 1997, he was back with the Austin Lone Stars, in 1998 and 1999, he played for the New Orleans Storm. In 2001, he was a player-coach with the Lafayette Lightning and in 2003 with the Austin Lightning of the Premier Development League. He also played for the Lafayette Swamp Cats in 2003.
