= Ocean City Nor'easters =

- Full name: Ocean City Nor'easters
- Nickname: Nor'easters
- Founded: 1996; 30 years ago (as South Jersey Barons)
- Stadium: Carey Stadium; Ocean City, New Jersey
- Capacity: 3,500
- Owner: Giancarlo Granese
- Manager: Matt Perrella
- League: USL League Two
- 2024: 1st, Mid Atlantic Division; Playoffs: Conference Quarterfinals
- Website: ocnoreasters.com
Home colors

Ocean City Nor'easters is an American soccer team based in Ocean City, New Jersey. Founded in 1996, the team currently plays in USL League Two, the fourth tier of the American Soccer Pyramid.

The team plays their home games at Carey Stadium which is located right next to the boardwalk in Ocean City, New Jersey. The stadium's nickname "The Beach House" was coined during the 2005 season by the team's play-by-play announcer Josh Hakala. The team's colors are royal blue and orange.

They are among the most successful USL League Two teams since joining the league in 2003 after six seasons in the USISL D-3 Pro League. Since 2003, they have the third-best regular season record and the fourth-best home record in the league. They are also one of the best amateur clubs in the country when it comes to the U.S. Open Cup. As a USL League Two team, they have won 11 games as an amateur team (12 overall) with six of them coming against professional opponents. Only two Open Division amateur teams Flint City Bucks with 10 and Des Moines Menace with 7) have more pro team upsets in the tournament's Modern Era (1995–present).

In 2008, the Barons formed a partnership with Reading of the English Football League Championship that has since ended. In 2010, following a split between the PDL team and their youth soccer affiliate, the team re-branded to Ocean City FC, adopted Reading's colors, and a similar badge. The team also adopted a new nickname: the Nor'easters. Since the re-brand the team has won two Eastern Conference championships (2013, 2016)

== History ==
=== South Jersey Barons, D-3 Pro League (1996–2002) ===
The club was founded in 1996 as the South Jersey Barons and joined the United Systems of Independent Soccer Leagues (USISL) as a professional franchise, competing in the USISL D-3 Pro League (now the United Soccer League). In 1998, in only their second year in existence, the Barons won the Mid-Atlantic Division title. The next year, they followed that up with a second straight playoff appearance and a run to the USISL D-3 national championship game. On September 11, 1999, the Barons, playing the title game on the road, lost 2–1 to the Western Mass Pioneers. The Barons made a third straight playoff appearance in 2000, but would struggle for the next three years, never finishing above fourth place in the division.

=== USL League Two (2003–present) ===
In 2003, the Barons moved to the USL Premier Development League, and after finishing in fourth place in their inaugural season, they made history in their second season in the PDL. In 2004, they became the fifth team in league history to go through the regular season with an unbeaten record (14–0–4). They won the Northeast Division title that year, but their season came to the end in the playoffs. In the conference championship game at McPherson Stadium in Greensboro, North Carolina, they lost to the Carolina Dynamo 3–2 on a goal in the 90th minute.

In 2005, the South Jersey Barons were taken over by a local businessman, Giancarlo Granese. The first act as new owner was to move the Barons to Ocean City, New Jersey permanently and rename the team the Ocean City Barons. The club moved into its new home at Carey Stadium on 6th Street and the Boardwalk.

In their first full season at Carey Stadium in the USL League Two, the club won every game in the regular season at home (8–0–0), and finished with a 12–3–1 overall record under the direction of player-coach-general manager Neil Holloway. By the end of the regular season, their home unbeaten streak had reached 22 games, with their last home loss coming back on June 7, 2003, against the Vermont Voltage. The fans came out to see the Barons win that year, as the club finished with the sixth-best home attendance in the USL League Two. They hosted the Eastern Conference playoffs, but were upset in the conference semifinals by the Richmond Kickers Future 4–3 on a goal in the final seconds of regulation by Richmond's Dominic Oduro.

2006 marked the 10th season for the Barons organization, but on the field, despite finishing with a winning record, it was considered a down year by club standards. The Barons finished with a 6–4–6 record, which was good enough for second place in the Northeast Division, and they missed the playoffs for the first time since moving to the PDL. The Barons' home unbeaten streak came to an end on July 16 when they lost 2–1 to the Ottawa Fury. The streak, which still stands as a club record, ended at 28 games. Since 2003, this remained the longest home unbeaten streak until the Des Moines Menace had a 30-game streak that ended in 2023.

In 2007, long-time Ocean City High School head coach Mike Pellegrino took over the coaching duties and returned the Barons to the playoffs. Their 9–3–4 record earned them a second-place finish in the Mid-Atlantic Division. Their home record continued with a 6–1–1 mark and the Barons were selected by the league to host the Eastern Conference playoffs for the second time in three years. The club lost in the conference semifinals to the Cape Cod Crusaders 5–0 after they had two players sent off in the opening 24 minutes of the match.

The 2008 campaign was a tale of two halves as the club suffered its worst season since joining the USL League Two. Despite this, they still had a winning record with 6 wins, 5 losses and 5 draws. In the first half of the season, the Barons were unbeaten, with a record of 4–0–4, but the second half of the season was a different story, finishing with a 2–5–1 record. Some of the highlights included Byron Carmichael becoming the club's all-time leader in goals and points, while finishing the season with an even 100 career points. Ocean City's 8–1 win over the expansion New Jersey Rangers was a historic one as Steve Miller scored the club's third hat trick in franchise history and it was the most goals scored in a game and the largest margin of victory that the club has ever enjoyed as a member of USL League Two.

The Barons bounced back from a disappointing 2008 season with one of the club's greatest campaigns in 2009. In addition to a pair of professional team upsets in the U.S. Open Cup and a date with D.C. United of Major League Soccer, Ocean City had a great regular season and a historic postseason run. After a 9–4–3 record earned them a third-place finish in the competitive Northeast Division and a spot in the postseason, they made history with two playoff wins before advancing to the PDL quarterfinals. The Barons eliminated the Long Island Rough Riders, the second best defensive team in the PDL, 2–0 in the opening round, giving OC their first playoff win since 2004. In the next round, the Men In Red handed the undefeated Ottawa Fury their first loss of the season with a 2–1 overtime win on a 98th-minute goal by Tyler Bellamy. The playoff run came to an end in Des Moines, Iowa, where they lost to the Chicago Fire Premier 3–0.

=== Rebrand as the Nor'easters ===
The club rebranded itself after the 2009 season, becoming the Ocean City Nor’easters and adopting the color scheme (royal blue & white) of English club Reading. However, in their first season with their new identity in 2010, the team struggled, finishing with a 5–6–5 record, their first losing season since they joined the PDL in 2003. By and large, the team featured a very young, inexperienced roster and failed to qualify for the post-season and the Lamar Hunt U.S. Open Cup. The season could have been different with a few different bounces of the ball, as four of the six losses suffered were by one goal.

The young players from the Under-20 Men continue to push into the first team, with the likes of Mitch Grotti, Jerry Guzzo and Gio Tacconelli all graduating to the PDL first team in 2011.

The Ocean City Nor’easters began the 2012 season with a change of head coach with Neil Holloway concentrating on his general manager duties and Rutgers-Camden coach Tim Oswald joining the team. The Nor’easters put together a roster that saw them go on a 13–3–0 regular season record which resulted in them winning the Mid-Atlantic Division and qualifying for the 2013 U.S. Open Cup. The Nor’easters recorded one of their biggest attendances of 1,175 for their final home game as the supporters gave their appreciation for the successful season.

The Nor’easters' was arguably their greatest to date. Ocean City finished with an 11–2–1 record (2nd best record in Eastern Conference) and qualified for the playoffs. In the postseason, they won the Eastern Conference championship and advanced to the PDL Semifinals. Earlier in the season, they added to their U.S. Open Cup resume by upsetting the Pittsburgh Riverhounds of the United Soccer League to earn their fifth win over a pro team. In the following round, they nearly knocked off the Philadelphia Union but the Major League Soccer side scored a game-winning goal in second half stoppage time.

After another winning season in 2014 (7–5–2), the Nor'easters lost out on a playoff berth in 2015 on the final day of the campaign. The club got back to their winning ways with a roster that was almost unrecognizable from the previous year. A 9–5–0 record was good enough for second place in the Mid-Atlantic Division and a spot in the PDL playoffs. When they got into the postseason, they made the most of it. They defeated three division champions en route to the PDL Semifinals with wins over the GPS Portland Phoenix, Charlotte Eagles, and their long-time rival Reading United AC in the conference final. They would fall to the Calgary Foothills FC in the PDL Semifinals hosted at Carey Stadium.

In 2017, former Ocean City defender John Thompson took over as head coach as Tim Oswald shifted to a front office role as Sporting Director. Despite finishing with a better regular season record (9–4–1) than the previous year's Eastern Conference championship team, the Nor'easters missed out on the PDL playoffs due to a change in the playoff format. In 2018, the division was even more competitive after adding the Long Island Rough Riders and a second straight nine-win season (9–5–0) wasn't enough to qualify for the postseason, and because the US Soccer Federation reduced the number of Open Division teams that were included in the 2019 tournament, they did not qualify for the U.S. Open Cup.

Prior to the 2019 season, John Thompson announced he was stepping down from the role as head coach. Later that offseason, the club announced that Tim Oswald would return to the sidelines as head coach with Kevin Nuss returning to the club to replace Oswald as Sporting Director. However, a week before the season, Oswald announced that he would be stepping down as head coach due to a medical concern and Kevin Nuss would take over as head coach. The team finished second in the Mid-Atlantic Division.

After the 2020 season was canceled due to the COVID-19 pandemic, play resumed in 2021 under new leadership. Alan McCann, who had won the last two USL-2 Coach of the Year awards while in charge of rival Reading United AC, was hired to lead the Nor'easters in the club's 24th season . McCann led the Nor'easters back to the playoffs but the Storm ultimately fell short, dropping a narrow 1–0 decision to West Chester United in the Eastern Conference semifinals . The Nor'easters finished with a 9–2–3 record, the club's best regular season record since 2013. Ocean City finished in second place in the Mid-Atlantic Division for the second year in a row.

The Nor'easters did it by making some history along the way on both sides of the ball. Offensively, the 2021 team scored 40 goals, the second most in the league, and the most by an Ocean City team since 2005. The club was led by Simon Becher with 11 goals. Becher, who was named to the All-Conference team , led the league in game-winning goals and finished tied for third in goals. On the defensive side, it was one of the best back lines in club history, allowing just 12 goals in 14 regular season games with a 0.86 team goals against average. Both were records for a 14-game season. Another defensive accomplishment was eight clean sheets across all competitions, the second-most in club history.

=== 25th season and beyond ===
In 2022, Kevin Nuss returned to the sidelines to lead the Nor'easters for the club's 25th season. Ocean City finished the regular season undefeated (11–0–3) for the second time in club history and won the Mid-Atlantic Division title for the fourth time. Last year's team made headlines for its offense, but in 2022, it was the defense that broke club records. Goalkeeper Felix Schafer led a defense that allowed just nine goals in 14 games, along with Ben Martino. Schafer broke the club record with a 0.55 goals against average (with five shutouts) and became the first Ocean City goalkeeper to be named the USL League Two Golden Glove winner. The team's 0.64 goals against average was also a club record for a 14-game season. The Nor'easters would finish undefeated at home (6–0–1) for the fifth time in club history and undefeated on the road (5–0–2) for the fourth time. The team also broke the club record for road undefeated streak. The Storm's streak would finish the campaign at 15 and would carry that streak into 2023. The Nor'easters qualified for the playoffs for the second year in a row, but they would fall to the Long Island Rough Riders in the opening round, 3–1.

After Kevin Nuss accepted a coaching job with USL League One's Union Omaha, Matt Perrella, his assistant from the 2019 and 2022 seasons, took over the head coaching job for 2023. Perrella made his Nor'easters head coaching debut in the Lamar Hunt US Open Cup with a 3–1 road win over rival West Chester United in Round 1. In the Second Round, the Storm faced a professional team for the 15th time in club history. They would fall on the road to the Maryland Bobcats FC 3–2 as the National Independent Soccer Association side scored a goal off a corner kick on the final kick of the game. Perrella would keep the team's unbeaten streak from last season going in 2023 as the team would not suffer a loss until the final game of the regular season to West Chester United. That unbeaten streak would end at 28 games (a club record) and the road unbeaten streak would remain alive (at 21 games) heading into 2024. The 8–1–5 record was enough for Ocean City to win back-to-back division titles for the first time in club history. In the playoffs, they avenged last season's playoff loss by eliminating the Long Island Rough Riders 2–1 in the Eastern Quarterfinals. They followed that up with a 2–1 win over the Hudson Valley Hammers. The playoff run would come to an end in the Eastern Conference Final (National Quarterfinals) with a 4–2 extra time loss to Lionsbridge FC.

=== U.S. Open Cup ===
Adding to their success in the league, the Barons have also qualified for the U.S. Open Cup on five occasions. They made their first appearance in 2002, their final year as a professional franchise. That year, they defeated Vereinigung Erzgebirge of the USASA 4–0 in the first round, but were eliminated in the next round 1–0 by the Hampton Roads Mariners, who played in the level above the Barons, in the A-League (now called the USL Championship).

In 2004, the year of their undefeated league season in the PDL, they began the tournament with a 5–0 thrashing of the USASA's Allied SC, and once again met an A-League team in the second round. The Syracuse Salty Dogs were the club, which featured Anthony Maher, the older brother of the Barons’ Matthew Maher. It was only the second time in the Modern Era (1995–present) of the Open Cup that two brothers played against each other in a Cup game. The original match seemed to be heading in the Barons’ direction in the 75th minute with the score tied at 1–1, and the Salty Dogs playing with nine men. Unfortunately for the underdogs, the referee abandoned the match at that point due to lightning and darkness. Six days later, the match was replayed, and despite Neil Holloway giving the Barons a 1–0 lead in the 22nd minute, Syracuse was too strong, knocking the Barons out of the tournament by the score of 4–2.

The following year, the Barons made a return to the Cup and made their biggest impression in club history. They began as they had the previous two tournament appearances with a 3–0 shutout win over historic USASA club, New York Greek-American Atlas. The Barons would host their second round match against the Long Island Rough Riders of the USL Second Division, and they used their home field advantage at Carey Stadium to thrash the Rough Riders 4–0. Ruben Mingo, Tony Donatelli, Chris Williams and Steven Wacker all scored in one of the second round's biggest upsets.

In the third round, the Barons were on the short end of a historical Open Cup match in Richmond, Virginia. Again, weather played a role, postponing the original game date, and a week later, the match was delayed by two hours. When the match was finally completed, the Barons had lost to the Richmond Kickers of the USL First Division, 8–4. The Kickers answered Byron Carmichael’s opening goal, with four straight tallies in the first half. Just before halftime, Carmichael cut the lead to two, and just after the break Tony Donatelli’s goal made it 4–3 in the 54th minute. However, the home side was too strong, and with the Barons pushing for an equalizer, the Kickers opened the floodgates. 12 goals was the most total goals scored in an Open Cup match in Modern Era, which began in 1995. The four goals conceded by the Richmond Kickers was the most they had allowed in their Open Cup history.

After missing out on the tournament in 2006, the Barons returned to the Cup in 2007 and began at home with a 1–0 upset over Crystal Palace Baltimore of the USL Second Division. They hosted the second round as well and lost 2–1 to the Harrisburg City Islanders in one of the more exciting matches of the 2007 Open Cup. The Barons had three balls cleared off the line in the second half, but they weren't able to equalize.

2009 was a landmark season for the Barons in the Open Cup as they qualified for the Open Cup for the fourth time in the last six years. But the biggest highlight was the fact that Ocean City faced off with a club from Major League Soccer for the first time in franchise history. The Barons’ run in the tournament began with a shocking 3–0 home upset of Crystal Palace Baltimore of the USL Second Division. Byron Carmichael was named TheCup.us Player of the Round after scoring a pair of first half goals and J. T. Noone would put the nail in the coffin with a second half goal. The upsets at The Beach House continued in Round 2 when the Barons’ Tunde Ogunbiyi shutout the Real Maryland Monarchs of the Second Division and Noone converted a penalty kick in the second period of overtime to put the Barons into the third round by a score of 1–0. With the win, Ocean City became only the sixth amateur team in the Open Cup's modern history to register back-to-back wins over professional teams. Ogunbiyi remains one of three goalkeepers (Jesse Llamas, Derby Carillo) in the Modern Era to earn multiple shutout wins for an amateur team against professional teams in one tournament.

In Round 3, the Barons would put a scare into D.C. United but would fall 2–0 to the defending Open Cup champs on a wet night at the Maryland SoccerPlex in Germantown, Maryland.

After not qualifying for the U.S. Open Cup tournament from 2010 to 2012, the Ocean City returned to Cup action in 2013 defeating the New York Red Bull U-23's in the First Round at Carey Stadium 2–0. In the 2013 2nd Round they defeated USL Pro side the Pittsburgh Riverhounds 1–0 at Carey Stadium marking the team's fifth win over a professional team. However, they were beaten by the Philadelphia Union of MLS in the next round by the score of 2–1, after the Union scored a goal in second half stoppage time.

In 2017, the Nor'easters hosted Junior Lone Star FC of the Philadelphia Premier Soccer League in the opening round. After a 3–1 win, they advance to Round 2 where they hosted the Harrisburg City Islanders in a rematch of the 2007 Lamar Hunt U.S. Open Cup. After 120 minutes of scoreless soccer, Harrisburg won the penalty kick shootout 6–5. For Ocean City, it was the sixth shutout of a professional team, more than any amateur team in the Modern Era.

In 2018, the Nor'easters had to play all of their games on the road, starting with a 3–0 win in Ypsilanti, Michigan over NPSL power AFC Ann Arbor. Next, they traveled to North Carolina to take on the Charlotte Independence of the USL and they won the game 3–1 to earn their sixth win over a professional team in the competition. It was the first time they had upset a professional team away from home and it was the first time they did so while allowing a goal (the previous five were all shutouts). They would return to North Carolina where their US Open Cup run would come to an end with a 4–1 loss to North Carolina FC of the USL.

As a USL League Two team in the Lamar Hunt U.S. Open Cup, Ocean City have six wins with five of them being upsets of professional clubs. Only two amateur teams have more wins and upsets in the tournament (Michigan Bucks and Des Moines Menace)

==== U.S. Open Cup Results ====
Year	League Represented	Round	Opponent	Opponent's League	Result
2002	D3 Pro	1st Round	@ Vereinigung Erzgebirge	USASA	W, 4–0
2002	D3 Pro	2nd Round	vs. Hampton Roads Mariners	A-League	L, 1–0
2004	PDL	1st Round	vs. Allied S.C.	USASA	W, 5–0
2004	PDL	2nd Round	vs. Syracuse Salty Dogs	A-League	L, 4–2
2005	PDL	1st Round	@ Greek American AA	USASA	W, 4–0
2005	PDL	2nd Round	vs. Long Island Rough Riders	USL-2	W, 4–0
2005	PDL	3rd Round	@ Richmond Kickers	A-League	L, 8–4
2007	PDL	1st Round	@ Crystal Palace Baltimore	USL-2	W, 1–0
2007	PDL	2nd Round	vs. Harrisburg City Islanders	USL-2	L, 2–1
2009	PDL	1st Round	vs. Crystal Palace Baltimore	USL-2	W, 3–0
2009	PDL	2nd Round	vs. Real Maryland Monarchs	USL-2	W, 1–0 (AET)
2009	PDL	3rd Round	@ D.C. United	MLS	L, 2–0
2013	PDL	1st Round	vs. New York Red Bull U-23's	NPSL	W, 2–0
2013	PDL	2nd Round	vs. Pittsburgh Riverhounds	USL Pro	W, 1–0
2013	PDL	3rd Round	@ Philadelphia Union	MLS	L, 2–1
2014	PDL	2nd Round	vs. New York Greek American Atlas	Cosmopolitan Soccer League	L, 0–2
2017	PDL	1st Round	vs. Junior Lone Star	USASA	W, 3–1
2017	PDL	2nd Round	vs. Harrisburg City Islanders	USL	L, 0–0 (5–6 p)
2018	PDL	1st Round	@ AFC Ann Arbor	NPSL	W, 3–0
2018	PDL	2nd Round	@ Charlotte Independence	USL	W, 3–1
2018	PDL	3rd Round	@ North Carolina FC	USL	L, 1–4
2022	USL2	1st Round	vs. Lansdowne Yonkers FC	EPSL	L, 1–1 (3–4 p)
2023	USL2	1st Round	@ West Chester United SC	USLP	W, 3–1
2023	USL2	2nd Round	@ Maryland Bobcats FC	NISA	L, 2–3 (AET)

== Players ==
=== Current roster ===
As of July 28, 2023.

Note: Flags indicate national team as defined under FIFA eligibility rules; some limited exceptions apply. Players may hold more than one non-FIFA nationality.

No.	Pos.	Nation	Player
1	GK	GER	Felix Schafer
2	DF	USA	Galen Flynn
3	DF	USA	Brad Dildy
4	DF	USA	Bryce Meredith
5	DF	GER	Jan Riecke
6	MF	JAM	Tyrese Small
7	MF	ITA	Leonardo D'Ambrosio
8	MF	NOR	Sander Roed
9	FW	USA	Jack Sarkos
10	FW	ITA	Alessandro Arlotti
11	FW	ENG	Jamie Davis
12	DF	BRA	Joao de Oliveira
13	DF	USA	Shane Clancy
14	MF	JAM	Tajhay Williams
15	MF	USA	Nico Rubio
16	FW	USA	Colin Veltri
17	FW	USA	Daniel Russo
18	FW	ITA	Daniele Verdirosi
19	MF	USA	Nick Pariano

No.	Pos.	Nation	Player
20	FW	USA	Andrew Kitch
21	FW	USA	Ryan Becher
22	MF	JPN	Maruki Kawahara
23	DF	USA	Josh Jones
28	DF	ITA	Marco Torino
29	DF	USA	Yousif Kowa
33	GK	USA	Owen Moore
66	GK	ITA	Stefano Camerlengo
99	GK	USA	Brady Hochman
—	MF	USA	Kyle Galloway
—	MF	BRA	Andre "Dede" Sabino
—	GK	AUT	Sebastian Doppelhofer
—	DF	USA	Shaun Russell
—	DF	USA	Dylan Evande
—	FW	USA	Ryan Peterson
—	DF	USA	Raimondo Partito
—	DF	ZIM	Simbarashe Mazarura
—	DF	ZIM	Tapiwa Machingauta

=== Notable former players ===
This list of notable former players comprises players who went on to play professional soccer after playing for the team in the Premier Development League, or those who previously played professionally before joining the team.

- (United States) Tyler Bellamy (2008–09)
- (United States) Michael O'Keeffe (2013)
- (United States) John McCarthy (2011–12)
- (United States) Tony Donatelli (2004–05)
- (United States) Jamie Franks (2003, 2005)
- (United States) Ryan Heins (2003–07)
- (United States) Matthew Maher (2004–06)
- (United States) Matthew Nelson (2002)
- (United States) J.T. Noone (2009)
- (United States) Ryan Richter (2008–10)
- (United States) Jeremiah White (2003)
- (United States) Adam Williamson (2005, 2008)
- (United States) Ryan Finley (2008)
- (United States) Aaron Dennis (2014)
- (United States) Steven Miller (2008–09, 2011)
- (United States) Nate Bourdeau (2012)
- (United States) Tyler Miller (2012)
- (United States) Nick Bibbs (2012)
- (United States) Duke Lacroix (2012–13)
- (Canada) Jordan Murrell (2013)
- (United States) Ken Tribbett (2013)
- (Barbados) Keasel Broome (2013)
- (Colombia) Nicolas Perea (2013)
- (United States) Shawn McLaws (2013–14)
- (Germany) Jason Plumhoff (2012, 2014)
- (United States) Brendan Hines-Ike (2014)
- (United States) Mitchell Lurie (2014–15)
- (Brazil) Victor Araujo (2015)
- (United States) Derek Luke (2015)
- (United States) Tim Dobrowolski (2015)
- (United States) Eric Schoendorf (2015)
- (Jamaica) Chevaughn Walsh (2016)
- (United States) Chris Williams (2004–06, 2011)
- (Zambia) Mutaya Mwape (2016)
- (Portugal) Martim Galvão (2016)
- (United States) Harry Swartz (2015)
- (United States) Max Hemmings (2017–18)
- (United States) Todd Morton (2016–18)
- (United States) Ryan Howe (2016)
- (Argentina) Emil Cuello (2016)
- (United States) Logan Ketterer (2016)
- (United States) Mike Kirk (2016)
- (Ghana) Oscar Umar (2014–16)
- (United States) Logan Ketterer (2016)
- (Haiti) Fredlin Mompremier (2017–18)
- (Canada) Frantzly Zephirin (2017)
- (England) Imre Varadi (1997)
- (England) Deri Corfe (2018–19)
- (United States) Keegan Meyer (2019)
- (United States) Simon Becher (2021)
- (United States) Alec Smir (2018)
- (United States) Jahmali Waite (2021)
- (United States) Claudio Repetto (2019)
- (United States) Ben Martino (2022)
- (United States) Nick Pariano (2022–23)
- (United States) Jeorgio Kocevski (2022)
- (United States) Montel McKenzie (2021)

== Year-by-year ==
Year	Level	League	Regular season	Playoffs	U.S. Open Cup
South Jersey Barons
1997	3	USISL D-3 Pro League	6th, Mid Atlantic	did not qualify	did not qualify
1998	3	USISL D-3 Pro League	1st, Mid Atlantic	Division semifinals	did not qualify
1999	3	USL D-3 Pro League	1st, Northern	Final	did not qualify
2000	3	USL D-3 Pro League	2nd, Northern	Conference quarterfinals	did not qualify
2001	3	USL D-3 Pro League	6th, Northern	did not qualify	did not qualify
2002	3	USL D-3 Pro League	4th, Atlantic	did not qualify	2nd Round
2003	4	USL PDL	4th, Northeast	did not qualify	did not qualify
2004	4	USL PDL	1st, Northeast	Conference finals	2nd Round
Ocean City Barons
2005	4	USL PDL	2nd, Northeast	Conference semifinals	3rd Round
2006	4	USL PDL	2nd, Northeast	did not qualify	did not qualify
2007	4	USL PDL	2nd, Mid Atlantic	Conference semifinals	2nd Round
2008	4	USL PDL	5th, Northeast	did not qualify	did not qualify
2009	4	USL PDL	3rd, Northeast	Conference finals	3rd Round
Ocean City Nor’easters
2010	4	USL PDL	6th, Mid Atlantic	did not qualify	did not qualify
2011	4	USL PDL	7th, Mid Atlantic	did not qualify	did not qualify
2012	4	USL PDL	1st, Mid Atlantic	Conference semifinals	did not qualify
2013	4	USL PDL	1st, Mid Atlantic	National Semifinals	3rd Round
2014	4	USL PDL	4th, Mid Atlantic	did not qualify	2nd Round
2015	4	USL PDL	6th, Mid Atlantic	did not qualify	did not qualify
2016	4	USL PDL	2nd, Mid Atlantic	National Semifinals	did not qualify
2017	4	USL PDL	3rd, Mid Atlantic	did not qualify	2nd Round
2018	4	USL PDL	4th, Mid Atlantic	did not qualify	3rd Round
2019	4	USL League Two	2nd, Mid Atlantic	did not qualify	did not qualify
2020	4	USL League Two	Season cancelled due to COVID-19 pandemic		
2021	4	USL League Two	2nd, Mid Atlantic	Conference semifinals	did not qualify
2022	4	USL League Two	1st, Mid Atlantic	Conference quarterfinals	1st Round
2023	4	USL League Two	1st, Mid Atlantic	Conference Final	2nd Round
2024	4	USL League Two	1st, Mid Atlantic	Conference quarterfinals	did not qualify
2025	4	USL League Two	2nd, Mid Atlantic	Conference Qualifying Round	did not qualify
2026	4	USL League Two	1st, Mid Atlantic	Conference Semifinals	did not qualify

== Honors ==
- 2023 USL League Two Mid-Atlantic Division Champions
- 2022 USL League Two Mid-Atlantic Division Champions
- 2024 USL League Two Mid-Atlantic Division Champions
- 2016 USL PDL Eastern Conference Champions
- 2013 USL PDL Eastern Conference Champions
- 2013 USL PDL Mid-Atlantic Division Champions
- 2012 USL PDL Mid-Atlantic Division Champions
- 2004 USL PDL Northeast Division Champions
- 1999 USISL D-3 Pro League Regular Season Champions
- 1999 USISL D-3 Pro League Northern Division Champions
- 1998 USISL D-3 Pro League Mid Atlantic Division Champions

=== Organizational Awards ===
- 2008 USL PDL Organization of the Year
- 2007 USL PDL Communications Award
- 2007 USL PDL Executive of the Year (Neil Holloway)
- 2006 USL Hall of Fame Inductee ("10+ club")
- 2005 USL Progress Award

== Head coaches ==
- (United States) Matt Driver (1997–5/3/2002) Record: 53–38–2
- (United States) Sam Maira (5/11/2002–2003) Record: 16–16–3
- (United States) Dan Christian (2004) Record: 14–0–4
- (United States) Mike Pellegrino (2007–2008) Record: 15–8–9
- (England) Neil Holloway (2005–2006, 2009–2011) Record: 32–17–15
- (United States) Tim Oswald (2012–2016) Record: 47–19–6
- (England) John Thompson (2017–2018) Record: 18–9–1
- (United States) Kevin Nuss (2019) Record: 6–3–5
- (Republic of Ireland) Alan McCann (2021) Record: 9–2–3
- (United States) Kevin Nuss (2022) Record: 17–3–8
- (Marshall Islands) Matt Perrella (2023) Record: 8–1–5

== Stadium ==
Carey Stadium ("The Beach House") in Ocean City, New Jersey has been the primary home for the Ocean City Nor'easters for the majority of the club's history with the exception of the 2001, 2003 and 2004 seasons. In 2002, the season was split between Carey Stadium and Community Park at Rutgers-Camden University in Newark, NJ. Since 2005, when the club made its permanent home at Carey Stadium, the Nor'easters have had to play eight games at the nearby Tennessee Avenue Soccer Complex in Ocean City, New Jersey due to scheduling conflicts and when the turf at Carey Stadium was being replaced.

Located a little more than 200 meters from the Atlantic Ocean, only one minor league sports team in the country plays closer to an ocean than the Nor'easters do (Minor league baseball team Pensacola Blue Wahoos in Pensacola, Florida)

1997
Carey Stadium; Ocean City, New Jersey
Eastern Regional High School; Voorhees, NJ (1 game)

1998
Carey Stadium; Ocean City, New Jersey
Eastern Regional High School; Voorhees, NJ (4 games)

1999
Carey Stadium; Ocean City, New Jersey
Edgewood Regional High School; Tansboro, New Jersey (3 games)
Carl Lewis Stadium; Willingboro Township, New Jersey (1 game)

2000
Carey Stadium; Ocean City, New Jersey
Edgewood Regional High School; Tansboro, New Jersey (2 games)
Lenape High School; Medford, New Jersey (1 game)

2001
Cherokee High School; Marlton, New Jersey
Carey Stadium; Ocean City, New Jersey (3 games)

2002
Rutgers-Camden Community Park; Camden, New Jersey (5 games)
Carey Stadium; Ocean City, New Jersey (5 games)

2003
Stadium at Mercer County Community College; West Windsor, New Jersey

2004
Winslow Stadium; Winslow, New Jersey (2004)

2005–present
Carey Stadium; Ocean City, New Jersey

== Attendances ==
Attendance stats are calculated by averaging each team's self-reported home attendances from Kenn.com https://kenn.com/blog/soccer/all-time-usl-third-division-attendance/

https://kenn.com/blog/soccer/all-time-usl-league-two-attendance/

South Jersey Barons

- 1997: 1,064
- 1998: 1,108 Playoffs: 1,168 Overall: 1,113
- 1999: 1,158
- 2000: 1,318 Playoffs: 1,087 Overall: 1,297
- 2001: 1,077
- 2002: 467
- 2003: 153 (38th in PDL)
- 2004: 159 (44th in PDL)

Ocean City Barons

- 2005: 877 (6th in PDL) Playoffs:NA
- 2006: 491 (18th in PDL)
- 2007: 588 (13th in PDL) Playoffs: 878 Overall: 620
- 2008: 339 (29th in PDL)
- 2009: 245 (40th in PDL)

Ocean City Nor’easters

- 2010: 311 (31st in PDL)
- 2011: 450 (25th in PDL)
- 2012: 626 (13th in PDL)
- 2013: 533 (23rd in PDL) Playoffs:604 Overall: 551
- 2014: 366 (26th in PDL)
- 2015: 305 (25th in PDL)
- 2016: NA Playoffs:NA
- 2017: NA
- 2018: NA
- 2019: NA
- 2022: NA
- 2023: NA
- 2024: Playoffs:NA

== All Time MLS Draft Picks ==
Player name	College	Years with Ocean City	Draft year	Round	Team
Jeremiah White	Wake Forest	2003	2004 MLS SuperDraft	Round 3 (24th overall)	New England Revolution
Patrick Hannigan	Temple	2004, 2011	2005 MLS Supplemental Draft	Round 3 (30th overall)	Metrostars
Brian Devlin	Penn State	2003, 2004	2006 MLS Supplemental Draft	Round 3 (31st overall)	Metrostars
Tony Donatelli	Temple	2004, 2005	2006 MLS Supplemental Draft	Round 3 (32nd overall)	Houston 1836 (Houston Dynamo)
Adam Williamson	Lehigh	2005, 2008	2006 MLS Supplemental Draft	Round 3 (35th overall)	New England Revolution
Michael Todd	Hofstra	2005	2007 MLS Supplemental Draft	Round 2 (16th overall)	Kansas City Wizards
Danny Cepero	UPenn	2006	2007 MLS Supplemental Draft	Round 4 (46th overall)	New York Red Bulls
Jamie Franks	Wake Forest	2003, 2005	2009 MLS SuperDraft	Round 4 (49th overall)	Chivas USA
Ryan Richter	La Salle	2008–2010	2011 MLS Supplemental Draft	Round 1 (5th overall)	Philadelphia Union
Steven Miller	Colgate	2008–2009, 2011	2012 MLS Supplemental Draft	Round 3 (39th overall)	Montreal Impact
Ryan Finley	Notre Dame/Duke	2008	2013 MLS SuperDraft	Round 1 (9th overall)	Columbus Crew SC
Tyler Miller	Northwestern	2012	2015 MLS SuperDraft	Round 2 (33rd overall)	Seattle Sounders FC
Keasel Broome	Providence	2013	2015 MLS SuperDraft	Round 3 (46th overall)	San Jose Earthquakes
Jordan Murrell	Syracuse	2013	2015 MLS SuperDraft	Round 3 (57th overall)	Real Salt Lake
Shawn McLaws	Coastal Carolina	2013–14	2015 MLS SuperDraft	Round 3 (59th overall)	New York Red Bulls
Mitchell Lurie	Rutgers	2014–2015	2016 MLS SuperDraft	Round 3 (44th overall)	Philadelphia Union
Brandan Hines-Ike	Creighton/South Florida	2014	2016 MLS SuperDraft	Round 3 (55th overall)	Montreal Impact
Mitchell Taintor	Rutgers	2013	2016 MLS SuperDraft	Round 3 (59th overall)	Toronto FC
John Manga	Cincinnati	2015	2016 MLS SuperDraft	Round 4 (63rd overall)	Colorado Rapids
Eric Klenofsky	Monmouth	2014–15	2017 MLS SuperDraft	Round 2 (34th overall)	D.C. United
Logan Ketterer	Bradley	2016	2017 MLS SuperDraft	Round 4 (71st overall)	Columbus Crew SC
Andre Morrison	Hartford	2015–16	2018 MLS SuperDraft	Round 3 (69th overall)	Toronto FC
Emil Cuello	SMU	2016	2019 MLS SuperDraft	Round 1 (19th overall)	LA Galaxy
Deri Corfe	Wright State	2018–19	2020 MLS SuperDraft	Round 2 (41st overall)	New York Red Bulls
Keegan Meyer	High Point	2019	2020 MLS SuperDraft	Round 2 (43rd overall)	New England Revolution
Simon Becher	Saint Louis Univ.	2021	2022 MLS SuperDraft	Round 1 (16th overall)	Vancouver Whitecaps FC
Alec Smir	North Carolina	2018	2022 MLS SuperDraft	Round 3 (62nd overall)	FC Dallas
Joshua Bolma	Maryland	2021	2023 MLS SuperDraft	Round 1 (4th overall)	New England Revolution
Abdi Salim	Syracuse	2022	2023 MLS SuperDraft	Round 1 (17th overall)	Orlando City SC
Luis Grassow	Kentucky	2021	2023 MLS SuperDraft	Round 2 (47th overall)	Orlando City SC
MD Myers	Rutgers / High Point	2021–22	2023 MLS SuperDraft	Round 3 (66th overall)	New York City FC
Andrew Privett	Penn State	2021	2023 MLS SuperDraft	Round 3 (69th overall)	Charlotte FC
Jeorgio Kocevski	Syracuse	2022	2024 MLS SuperDraft	Round 1 (21st overall)	Orlando City SC
Josh Jones	Louisville	2023–24	2024 MLS SuperDraft	Round 2 (47th overall)	Real Salt Lake
Jansen Miller	Indiana / Xavier	2024	2025 MLS SuperDraft	Round 1 (8th overall)	Sporting Kansas City
