= Matthew Maher =

Matthew Maher is the name of:

- Matthew Maher (soccer) (born 1984), American soccer player
- Matthew Maher (actor), American television and theater actor
- Matt Maher (born 1974), Canadian-born singer
