= 2000 USL D3 Pro League =

USL D3 Pro League
- Season: 2000
- Champions: Charlotte Eagles (1st Title)
- Regular Season title: New Jersey Stallions (1st Title)
- Matches: 198
- Goals: 770 (3.89 per match)
- Best Player: (Brazil) Julio Cesar-Dos Santos New Jersey Stallions
- Top goalscorer: (Brazil) Julio Cesar-Dos Santos New Jersey Stallions (20 Goals)
- Best goalkeeper: (United States) Matt Nelson Cape Cod Crusaders

Statistics of USL D3 Pro League in season 2000.

== League standings ==
                           GP   W   L   D   GF  GA  BP Pts
    Northern Division
New Jersey Stallions        18  14   3   1   43  21   7  64
South Jersey Barons         18  12   6   0   46  33   9  57
New Hampshire Phantoms      18  10   6   2   30  20   5  47
Reading Rage                18   9   9   0   28  29   4  40
Western Mass Pioneers       18   8   8   2   30  28   4  38
Cape Cod Crusaders          18   7   6   5   29  23   4  37
Delaware Wizards            18   5  12   1   28  46   5  26
Rhode Island Stingrays      18   5  11   2   22  41   2  24

    Southern Division
Texas Rattlers              18  14   4   0   43  29   8  64
Wilmington Hammerheads      18  13   4   1   47  19   7  60
Charlotte Eagles            18  11   4   3   47  22   7  54
Carolina Dynamo             18   9   8   1   38  31   5  42
Houston Hurricanes          18   8   9   1   42  41   9  42
Roanoke Wrath               18   6  11   1   24  45   4  29
Northern Virginia Royals    18   6  12   0   30  53   4  28
Austin Lone Stars           18   2  15   1   18  45   2  11

    Western Division
Chico Rooks                 18  12   6   0   39  28   8  56
Utah Blitzz                 18  11   4   3   34  20   7  54
Tucson Fireballs            18  11   5   2   36  27   7  53
Stanislaus United Cruisers  18   7  10   1   35  32   5  34
Riverside County Elite      18   7  10   1   35  22   5  34
Arizona Sahuaros            18   5  12   1   46  53   7  28

Conference Quarterfinals: Western Massachusetts defeated South Jersey 3-2(OT)
                         Reading defeated New Hampshire 3–2.
                         Carolina defeated Texas 4–2.
                         Charlotte defeated Wilmington 3–1.
                         Chico defeated Stanislaus County 3–2.
                         Utah defeated Tulsa 1–0.

Conference Semifinals:    Utah defeated Chico 1-0 (OT)
                         Western Massachusetts defeated Reading 4–0.
                         Charlotte defeated Carolina 4–1.
Conference Finals:        Charlotte defeated Utah 4–2.
                         New Jersey defeated Western Massachusetts 1–0.
CHAMPIONSHIP:             Charlotte defeated New Jersey 5–0.

== Playoffs ==
=== Conference semifinals ===
August 19, 2000
4:00 PM EDT
Semifinals

Chico Rooks	3–2 (OT)	Stanislaus United Cruisers
Felipe Ternero 3'; Jake Gwin 79'; Joe Munoz 118'	Report	83' Fadi Afash; 87' (pen.) Mike Descombaz

Chico State University Stadium, Chico, California

August 19, 2000
5:00 PM EDT

South Jersey Barons	2–3 (OT)	Western Mass Pioneers
Kevin Kelly 54', 69'; Michael Knowles (red card) 69'	Report 1Report 2	9', 31' Rob Jachym; 104' Ricardo Monje

Carey Stadium, Ocean City, New Jersey
Attendance: 1,087

August 19, 2000
7:30 PM EDT

New Hampshire Phantoms	2–3	Reading Rage
Mike Keevan 44'; Jamie Williams 59'	Report	10' Robert Henes; 51' Neil Stoddart; 52' Eric Puls

Singer Family Park, Manchester, New Hampshire

August 19, 2000
8:30 PM EDT

Texas Rattlers	2–4	Carolina Dynamo
Boyce Morrow (red card) 40'; Wilco Ravestijn 50'; Dwayne Kilpatrick 55'	Report	75', 76' Jose Espindola; 82' Vince Bueno; 90+' Jason Haupt

Old Panther Field, Duncanville, Texas

August 19, 2000
10:00 PM EDT

Utah Blitzz	1–0	Tucson Fireballs
B.J. McNicol 89'	Report

BYU Soccer Field, Provo, Utah

August 20, 2000
8:30 PM EDT
Semifinals

Wilmington Hammerheads	1–3	Charlotte Eagles
Chuck Panos 60'	Report 1 Report 2	77', 81' Jeff Johnson; 86' Dustin Swinehart

Legion Stadium, Wilmington, North Carolina
Attendance: 1,841

=== Conference Finals ===
Southern Conference Final
August 25, 2000
7:30 PM EDT

Charlotte Eagles	4–1	Carolina Dynamo
Ryan Leib 1'; Joey Johnson 49'; Jeff Johnson 55'; Nate Watkins 71'	Report	39' (pen.) Jose Espindola

Richardson Stadium, Davidson, North Carolina
Attendance: 1,117

Western Conference Final
August 26, 2000
4:00 PM EDT

Chico Rooks	0–1 (OT)	Utah Blitzz
	Report	94' Richard Breza

Chico State University Stadium, Chico, California
Attendance: 2,137

Northern Conference Final
August 26, 2000
7:30 PM EDT

Western Mass Pioneers	4–0	Reading Rage
Joshua Houle 13', 78'; Gary Clark 90+'	Report

Lusitano Stadium, Ludlow, Massachusetts
Attendance: 3,961

=== League Semi-Finals ===
September 2, 2000
7:30 PM EDT
Semifinals

Western Mass Pioneers	0–1	New Jersey Stallions
	Report	87' Rafeal Mea Vitale

Lusitano Stadium, Ludlow, Massachusetts
Attendance: 4,120

September 2, 2000
7:30 PM EDT
Semifinals

Charlotte Eagles	4–2	Utah Blitzz
Ryan Leib 20'; Mark Pinch 32'; Joey Johnson 39'; Nate Watkins 70'	Report	28', 30' BJ McNicol

Providence High School, Charlotte, North Carolina
Attendance: 2,499

=== D3 Pro League Championship Game ===
September 9, 2000
7:30 PM EDT

Charlotte Eagles	5–0	New Jersey Stallions
Jeff Johnson 53', 90'; Dustin Swinehart 60', 77', 84'	Report

Providence High School, Charlotte, North Carolina
Attendance: 5,350
