= Keegan Meyer =

American soccer player (born 1997)

Personal information
- Date of birth: 10 March 1997 (age 29)
- Place of birth: Silver Spring, Maryland, U.S.
- Height: 1.90 m (6 ft 3 in)
- Position: Goalkeeper

Team information
- Current team: Charlotte Independence
- Number: 1

Youth career
- Baltimore Celtic

College career
Years	Team	Apps	(Gls)
2015–2019	High Point Panthers	72	(0)

Senior career*
Years	Team	Apps	(Gls)
2017	South Georgia Tormenta	4	(0)
2018	Des Moines Menace	4	(0)
2019	Ocean City Nor'easters	1	(0)
2020	New England Revolution II	8	(0)
2021	Loudoun United	3	(0)
2022–	Charlotte Independence	3	(0)
- * Club domestic league appearances and goals as of October 16, 2022

Keegan Meyer (born March 10, 1997) is an American former soccer player who played as a goalkeeper for Charlotte Independence in the USL League One.

== Career ==
=== College and amateur ===
Meyer played college soccer at High Point University from 2015, redshirting his freshman season before going on to play four seasons as starter for the Panthers. Meyer was named All-Big South First Team in three consecutive seasons starting 2017 through to 2019. Meyer finished his time at High Point as the school's all-time leader in career shutouts with 27.

While at college, Meyer also played in the USL League Two with Tormenta FC, Des Moines Menace and Ocean City Nor'easters.

=== Professional ===
On January 9, 2020, Meyer was selected 43rd overall pick of the 2020 MLS SuperDraft by New England Revolution. On February 10, 2020, he was signed by the club's USL League One affiliate New England Revolution II.

Meyer made his professional debut on August 21, 2020, starting against Richmond Kickers.

Meyer's contract option was declined by New England on November 30, 2020.

On February 11, 2021, Loudoun United signed Meyer.

Meyer signed with USL League One side Charlotte Independence on March 18, 2022.

On December 4, 2022, Meyer announced his retirement from soccer on his Instagram page.
