= Jim Benedek =

Hungarian-American soccer player and coach

Personal information
- Full name: Janos "James" Geza Benedek
- Date of birth: June 9, 1941
- Place of birth: Budapest, Hungary
- Date of death: March 30, 2009 (aged 67)
- Place of death: Dallas, Texas, United States
- Positions: Forward; defender

Youth career
- Ithaca College

Senior career*
Years	Team	Apps	(Gls)
1968	Houston Stars	19	(3)
1969	Kansas City Spurs	0	(0)
1970–1973	Dallas Tornado	45	(0)
1971	Dallas Tornado (indoor)	2	(2)

International career
1968	United States	4	(0)

Managerial career
- 1975–1983: Southern Methodist University
- –1998: Hungary (assistant)
- 1999: Texas Toros
- 1999: North Texas Heat
- 1999–2008: North Lake College
- 2001: West Dallas Kings
- * Club domestic league appearances and goals

Janos "Jim" Benedek (June 9, 1941 – March 30, 2009) was a Hungarian-American soccer forward who later coached at both the collegiate and national team levels. Benedek was an All American collegiate soccer player before spending six seasons in the North American Soccer League. He earned four caps with the U.S. national team in 1968 and was a member of the team that attempted to qualify for the 1968 Summer Olympics.

== Player ==
=== College ===
In 1963, Benedek immigrated to the United States. He attended Ithaca College in Ithaca, New York, where he was a 1965 first team All American at outside left. In 1961, he was also a member of Chicago Schwaben as that team toured West Germany and later served in the U.S. Army.

=== Professional ===
After graduating from Ithaca, he attempted to gain a place on several European clubs in Austria, France and Germany, but ultimately returned to the U.S. and signed with the Houston Stars of the North American Soccer League (NASL) in 1968. The Houston Stars folded at the end of the 1968 season and Benedek moved to the Kansas City Spurs for the 1969 season. In 1969, the Spurs won the NASL championship. Benedek then moved to the Dallas Tornado where he played a single season, his most productive, as a defender. He was again a member of a championship team when the Tornado took the 1971 NASL title. He was also a member of the Dallas team that won the first-ever NASL-sanctioned indoor tournament in 1971, scoring two goals in the opening match and being named to the All-tournament squad. He left the NASL following the 1973 season to become a college soccer coach.

=== Olympic and national team ===
Benedek was a member of the U.S. soccer team which attempted to qualify for the 1968 Summer Olympics. On May 21, 1967, he scored in a 1–1 tie with Bermuda in the first qualification game. The U.S. lost the away match and did not qualify for the tournament.

Benedek earned four caps with the U.S. national team in 1968. His first game with the U.S. came in a 3–3 tie with Israel on September 15, 1968. His last two games, both played in November 1968 against Bermuda were qualifiers for the 1970 FIFA World Cup. While the U.S. won both games, it failed to qualify for the finals after several losses in 1969.

== Coach ==
In 1974, Southern Methodist University (SMU) hired Benedek to begin a men's soccer team at the school. He remained with the team through the end of the 1984 season. Benedek also spent several years as an assistant coach with the Hungary national team. In 1999, he coached the West Texas Heat of the W-League to an 8–2 record and the second division title. He also coached the Texas Toros of the USL D-3 Pro League. In 2001, he coached the West Dallas Kings of the Premier Development League. He went on to coach the men's and women's soccer team at North Lake College in Irving, Texas, before succumbing to cancer. He died in March 2009 of prostate cancer.

== Legacy ==
In 2009, Jim was inducted to the FC Dallas Walk of Fame.
