= Toronado =

Toronado may refer to:

- Tornado (horse), occasionally Toronado, the horse of Zorro
- Fender Toronado, an electric guitar produced by Fender Musical Instruments
- Oldsmobile Toronado, aa full-size luxury coupe produced by Oldsmobile
- Toronado Rocket, an automobile engine produced by Oldsmobile
- Toronado (racehorse), an Irish thoroughbred racehorse

== See also ==
- Tornado (disambiguation)
