= West Dallas Kings =

- Full name: West Dallas Kings
- Nickname: Kings
- Founded: 2001
- League: Premier Development League
- 2001: 4th Mid South Division
| Home colours | Away colours |

West Dallas Kings were an American soccer team, founded in 2001 by Michael Gordon, Reagan Angell, and David Angell. They were members of the United Soccer Leagues Premier Development League (PDL), the fourth tier of the American Soccer Pyramid, for only one season and coached by Jim Benedek.

== Year-by-year ==
| Year | Division | League | Reg. season |
|---|---|---|---|
| 2001 | 4 | USL PDL | 4th, Mid-South Division |
