= Tournado =

Tournado may refer to the following albums:

- Tournado (The All-American Rejects album)
- Tournado (Tangerine Dream album)

== See also ==
- Tornado (disambiguation)
