= Christopher Williams (soccer) =

American soccer player

Personal information
- Full name: Christopher Jordan Williams
- Date of birth: May 21, 1984 (age 42)
- Place of birth: Philadelphia, United States
- Height: 6 ft 4 in (1.93 m)
- Position: Defender

Team information
- Current team: San Antonio Scorpions
- Number: 28

College career
Years	Team	Apps	(Gls)
2002–2005	Philadelphia Rams		

Senior career*
Years	Team	Apps	(Gls)
2004–2006	Ocean City Barons	28	(2)
2007–2008	Philadelphia KiXX (indoor)	25	(1)
2007–2009	Miami FC	52	(1)
2010	Đà Nẵng		
2011	Ocean City Nor'easters	12	(1)
2012–2013	Harrisburg Heat (indoor)	15	(10)
2013	Baltimore Blast (indoor)	4	(0)
2013	San Antonio Scorpions	5	(0)
- * Club domestic league appearances and goals

Christopher Williams (born May 21, 1984, in Philadelphia) is a free agent American soccer player.

== Career ==
=== College and amateur ===
Williams played college soccer at Philadelphia University from 2002 to 2005. [1] Junior and senior year saw Williams earn Philadelphia Soccer Seven and Atlantic Soccer Conference 1st team honors. He graduated with a bachelor's degree in business management. During his college years he also played with the Ocean City Barons in the USL Premier Development League during the collegiate off season, playing play with the Barons each summer from 2004 through 2006. Williams was named to the 2004 All-Conference Team while leading the Barons to a rare undefeated regular season (14–0–4). After this undefeated season in 2004, Williams was offered a contract from New England Revolution but declined and decided to finish school.

=== Professional ===
Late summer of 2006, after a season in Ocean City, Chris played with the New York Red Bulls before signing with Miami FC of the USL First Division, playing in 21 games and was 4th on the team in minutes played. The fall of 2007, he was drafted 1st round, 4th overall and eventually signed with the Philadelphia KiXX of Major Indoor Soccer League.

He played the 2007-2008 MISL season with the KiXX, then rejoined Miami FC for the 2008 summer season. The winter of 2008 saw Williams go on trial and sign with Danish 2nd Division club Blokhus FC, however the contract was mutually annulled before Williams returned to Denmark. While on trial with Blokhus Williams was identified by 1st division side Thisted FC landing him a trial with the club after his annulled contract. Williams was set to return to Thisted in the summer window of 2009, however due to some financial quagmires at the club he was not brought back. In December 2009, Miami FC welcomed Chris Back to the team.

After this season, Williams signed with Đà Nẵng of the V-League, the top division in Vietnam . In 2009, Da Nang won the League and the cup title landing them in the 2010 AFC Champions league. Upon his return to the United States in 2011 Williams signed for his old PDL club, the Ocean City Nor'easters . He made his debut for his new team on May 28 in a 2–2 tie against the Long Island Rough Riders . After a short spell in Ocean city to keep fit, in late 2011, Williams went back to Vietnam where he was signed by his former team SHB Da Nang, and loaned to Fico Tây Ninh FC.

In the fall of 2012, Williams signed with the Harrisburg Heat of the Professional Arena Soccer League where he scored 10 goals and 4 assists and was named the team's co-MVP. Williams left Harrisburg with one game left to join the Baltimore Blast of the Major Indoor Soccer League . Baltimore went on to when the 2013 Championship, where Williams assisted on the Championship game-winning goal.

While in Baltimore Chris signed with the San Antonio Scorpions of the NASL, which was to begin as soon as his stint in Baltimore was complete (Late March 2013). While in San Antonio Williams played in five consecutive matches, 4 of which he started in. Due to a family emergency Williams parted ways with the Scorpions and was thought to have retired.

In June 2013, Williams traveled to Thailand for two months with Club Bangkok United. Upon return to the states Williams, signed for MISL club PA Roar, where he was team captain. Chris was 2nd in the league in blocked shots with 29, as well as 13th in points for a defender despite the teams last place finish (1–19). The summer of 2014 Williams passed on offers from Sweden and Australia as well as the USL and NASL to build on his coaching academy. Chris Williams' oldest brother is American Professional Heavyweight Boxer Chazz Witherspoon.
