= Saeed Kadkhodaian =

Retired American soccer player

President of the Minnesota Thunder
- In office 2005-2007

Personal details
- Born: Iran
Association football career
Senior career*
Years	Team	Apps	(Gls)
1987-?	Austin Sockadillos		
Managerial career
- 1997-?: Austin Lone Stars
- * Club domestic league appearances and goals

Saeed Kadkhodaian is an American retired soccer player, former team owner and currently the president of Azad, Inc. Soccer USA and Doostan, Inc. Soccer USA. He had previously played for, owned and coached the Austin Sockadillos and owned the Minnesota Thunder from 2005 to 2007.

== Biography ==
Kadkhodaian, a native of Iran, spent much of his youth in Germany. In 1973, he moved to Austin, Texas to work as a mechanical engineer for a telecommunications company. In 1978, he moved to Minnesota before eventually returning moving back to Texas. In 1987, he began playing for the Austin Sockadillos in the Southwest Indoor Soccer League. He also served as the team's director of operations. In 1989, he purchased the team from founder Francisco Marcos. The team was renamed the Austin Lone Stars in 1994. In 1997, Kadkhodaian coached the team for several games after head coach Wolfgang Suhnholz was named as an assistant coach with the U.S. U-16 national team. In 1999, he became team president.

In addition to playing soccer, Kadkhodaian also worked for twenty-five years as an engineer for 3M. He left the firm in 2003. In 1986, he founded a string of soccer stores, known as Soccer USA, in both Texas and Minnesota. In 1998, he became a minority shareholder in the Minnesota Thunder. In April 2005, Kadkhodaian became a majority owner, along with minority owners Ron Carter and Jim Froslid, after they purchased the Minnesota Thunder of the USL First Division from Bill George. After the change in ownership, Kadkhodaian became president of the Thunder. In August 2007, WingField NV, a Belgium-based real estate firm, purchased the Thunder from the three partners. In February 2008, Kadkhodaian became a member of the board of directors for the Austin Aztex, but he left that position in February 2009.

In 2006, he was inducted into the United Soccer Leagues Hall of Fame.
