= Tornado (novel) =

1996 novel by Betsy Byars

- Author: Betsy Byars
- Language: English
- Publication date: 1996

Tornado (1996) is a children's book by Betsy Byars, illustrated by Doron Ben-Ami.

== Plot ==
To calm the fears of his boss's sons as they wait out a tornado in a storm cellar, Pete tells some well-worn stories of his childhood dog, Tornado: how he arrived intact in his doghouse during another tornado; how he could do a card trick; how he met the cat Five-Thirty; how he was reunited with his previous owners. Other stories will have to wait for another storm.

== Reception ==
Language Arts called the book "memorable and easy to read." Thelma Nelson of The Reading Teacher stated: "These engaging stories keep the reader or listener entertained from start to finish." Maeve Visser Knoth of The Horn Book Magazine wrote: "The format, with large print and plenty of white space, is inviting to younger middlegrade readers, who will move easily through Tornado and on into the canon of dog stories." The Tampa Tribune opined that Byars "creates subtle but masterly literary patterns of language, characterization, suspense and gentle humor."
