= Austin Lone Stars =

- Nickname: Austin Sockadillos
- Founded: 1987
- Dissolved: 2000
- Ground: Multiple
- Owner: Saeed Kadkhodaian; Rick Schram
- Coach: Wolfgang Suhnholz
- League: United Soccer League

The Austin Lone Stars were a soccer club that competed in the SISL, USISL and United Soccer Leagues from 1987 to 2000. The club originally started in 1987/88 as the Austin Sockadillos in the original indoor SISL league. They became the Austin Lone Stars in 1994.

== History ==
=== Soccadillos ===
In 1987, Fernando Marcos established the Austin Sockadillos. Coached by Tony Simoes and assisted by Wolfgang Suhnholz, the team played in the semi-professional Southwest Indoor Soccer League (SISL).

==== Indoor seasons ====
The team started their 1987-1988 season with a scrimmage against the reign Major Indoor Soccer League defending champions Dallas Sidekicks. They started the 1987 against the defending SISL champions Arlington Arrows, losing 2-1 in their opening match. After the initial loss, the Sockadillos were able to qualify for the 1987 SISL playoffs, defeating the Albuquerque Gunners in the first round. The Sockadillos fell to the Oklahoma City Warriors in the 1987–1988 SISL Championships, losing the first three games of the best-of-five series. During the 1988-1989 season, they played their home games at Tatu's All Star Indoor Soccer Place. Austin Sockadillos played well enough in their second season to again reach the championship matches, losing to the Lubbock Lazers 3 games to 2 in their five match set. but Austin garnered multiple post-season honors, including MPV and league leading scorer (71 goals) Brian Monaghan, assist leader Uwe Balzis and Coach of the Year Tony Simoes. Saeed Kadkhodaian became owner of the team prior to the 1989–1990 season. The Sockadillos started the 1989–1990 season in an explosive manner, breaking league records by beating the El Paso Sixshooters 27–3. Austin play remained strong enough throughout the season to earn them a spot in the playoffs for the third year in a row. Austin failed to get out of the first round of the playoffs, losing to the Arlington Arrows 8–5. For the beginning of the 1990–1991 indoor season, Coach Simoes only returned six players from the previous season as an effort to bring more youth to the team. The Sockadillos reached the playoffs for a fourth straight season, but once again failed to proceed past the first round, losing to the Colorado Comets. This was the team's last season playing indoor soccer.

==== Outdoor seasons ====
In 1989 the league introduced a summer outdoor season. During the 1989 outdoor season, the league was known as the Southwest Outdoor Soccer League and the team was known as the Capital Sockadillos. They played their home games at a variety of venues including Burger Center, Nelson Field, and House Park. After not being able to afford to travel to the semi-finals of the 1989 outdoor season playoffs, Kadkhodaian leased the club to the Austin Capital Soccer Club. Head coach Wolfgang Suhnholz pointed out that Austin Capital Soccer Club gave the Sockadillos a larger and more professional organization to help plan the team's season. The Sockadillos made it to the semi-finals again during the 1990 outdoor season, falling to the Richardson Rockets. The 1991 outdoor and 1992 outdoor seasons saw the Sockadillos finish outside of the playoffs. During this period both the USISL and Sockadillos dealt with financial difficulty as each season saw them spending more money then they earned. The 1993 season saw the Sockadillos miss the playoffs once again.

=== Austin Lone Stars ===
In March 1994, the team was renamed the Lone Stars and was co-owned by Kadkhodaian and Rick Schram. This season the Lone Stars once again qualified for the playoffs and made it to the division finals before falling to the DFW Toros 4–2. The 1995 season saw the Lone Stars qualify for playoffs and reach the division semi-finals before losing to Des Moines Menace. The 1996 season saw the Lone Stars get some pay back by knocking out Des Moines Meance in the Division semi-finals, before falling to the Omaha Flames in the Division finals.

==== Fully professional ====
In February 1997, the Lone Stars became a fully professional team. In preparation for their first fully professional season, Lone Stars played an exhibition match against MLS team Dallas Burn, coming away with a 1–0 loss. The 1997 season saw the Lone Stars qualify for the playoffs in their first professional season, falling in the Division semi-finals to the San Antonio Pumas. The 1998 season was the Lone Stars best of its short history with the team advancing to the championship round, finishing in 4th place after falling to the Orlando Nighthawks. The 1999 season saw the Lone Stars finish mid-table, qualifying for playoffs, but losing the Texas Toros in the division semi-finals. Going into the 2000 season the Lone Stars named Phillip Perry as their new head coach. The 2000 season was the final season for the Lone Stars seeing them finish at the bottom on the table with a 1–14 record.

=== U.S. Open Cup ===
The Soccadillos first experience in the U.S. Open Cup came in 1991, when they lost 3–0 to the Richardson Rockets in the Region III first round. In June 1997, Lone Stars earned a berth in the 1997 U.S. Open Cup advancing to the second round. before falling to the New Orleans Riverboat Gamblers. Once again, Austin Lone Stars qualified for the 1998 U.S. Open Cup, reaching the second round on a performance that concerned their new coach. The Lone Stars failed to advance past the second round, losing to Orange County Zodiac. The Lone Stars qualified for their third straight U.S. Open Cup in 1999, but once again could not make it out of the first round, losing to Texas Rattlers 2–0.

== Lady Lone Stars ==
In May 1999, the Austin Lone Stars announced they would field their first woman's soccer team that played in the USL W-League. The team was coached by Jon McCain. The Lady Lone Stars started their campaign in the USL-W League with a 6–0 win against the Houston Tornados. Later that season, the Lady Lone Stars beat the Tornados again to earn a berth into the ULS W-2 playoffs in their first season. In the first round of the playoffs, the Lady Lone Stars played the North Texas Heat, the eventual 1999 champions The Lady Lone Stars second season was not as successful as their first with the team failing to score a goal for the first 10 games of the year.

== Year-by-year ==
=== Men ===
Year	Division	League	Reg. season	Playoffs	Open Cup
1987/88	N/A	SISL Indoor	3rd	Final	N/A
1988/89	N/A	SISL Indoor	1st, South	Final	N/A
1989	N/A	SOSL	4th	Did not qualify	Did not enter
1989/90	N/A	SISL Indoor	2nd, Texas	1st Round	N/A
1990	N/A	SISL	2nd, Eastern	Semifinals	Did not enter
1990/91	N/A	SISL Indoor	2nd, Southwest	Quarterfinals	N/A
1991	N/A	SISL	6th, Tex-Oma	Did not qualify	Regional First Round
1991/92	N/A	USISL Indoor	6th, Tex-Oma	Did not qualify	N/A
1992	N/A	USISL	5th, South Central	Did not qualify	Did not enter
1993	N/A	USISL	5th, South Central	Did not qualify	Did not enter
1994	3	USISL	5th, South Central	Divisional Finals	Did not enter
1995	"4"	USISL Premier League	2nd, Central	Divisional Semifinals	Did not qualify
1996	"4"	USISL Premier League	1st, Central Southern	Division Finals	Did not qualify
1997	3	USISL D-3 Pro League	2nd, South Central	Division Semifinals	2nd Round
1998	3	USISL D-3 Pro League	1st, South Central	Semifinals	2nd Round
1999	3	USL D-3 Pro League	5th, Western	Conference Semifinals	1st Round
2000	3	USL D-3 Pro League	8th, Southern	Did not qualify	Did not qualify

=== Women ===
Year	Division	League	Reg. season	Playoffs
1999	3	USL W-League W-2 Central Division	6th	First Round
2000	3	USL W-League W-2 West Division	4th	did not qualify

== Head coach ==
- Tony Simoes (indoor) (1987–1992)
- George Ley
- Wolfgang Suhnholz (outdoor) (1989–1995)
- Rober Weaver (player-coach) (1996)
- John Fitsimons 1998-2000
- Jon McCain (women's) 1999–2000

== Honors ==
MVP

- Brian Monaghan (1989)
- Gabe Jones (1995)

Leading scorer

- Brian Monaghan (1989)
- Gabe Jones (1995)

Rookie of the Year

- Steve Bailey (1987-1988)

Coach of the Year

- Tony Simoes

Executive of the Year

- Monika Suhnholz
