= Wichita Tornado =

Soccer club in Wichita, Kansas, United States

The Wichita Tornado was a soccer club based in Wichita, Kansas that competed in the SISL.

== Year-by-year ==
Year	Division	League	Reg. season	Playoffs	Open Cup
1988/89	N/A	SISL Indoor	3rd, West	Did not qualify	N/A
