= Seamus Donnelly (footballer) =

Irish retired professional footballer

Personal information
- Date of birth: 25 May 1971 (age 55)
- Place of birth: Dublin, Ireland
- Position: Forward

Youth career
- Home Farm
- 1994–1996: Franklin Pierce College

Senior career*
Years	Team	Apps	(Gls)
1997	New Hampshire Phantoms	?	(9)
1998–2000	Hampton Roads Mariners	?	(36)
2001–2003	Charleston Battery	43	(1)
2004	Harrisburg City Islanders		
- * Club domestic league appearances and goals

Seamus Donnelly (born 25 May 1971) is an Irish retired professional footballer who played professionally in the United States.

An aspiring Irish footballer, Donnelly broke his leg playing for Home Farm when he was eighteen years old. The injury put him out of playing for nearly a year and a half after which he played at the amateur level. While visiting family in Ireland, Sean Kenny, an assistant college coach in the United States, saw Donnelly playing in an amateur match. Kenny suggested Donnelly attend Franklin Pierce College on a soccer scholarship. He did so and was a 1995 First Team and 1996 Second Team Division II NCAA All American soccer player.
