= John Clare (soccer) =

American soccer coach

Personal information
- Place of birth: United States
- Position: Defender

Youth career
- 1986–1988: College of Boca Raton

Senior career*
Years	Team	Apps	(Gls)
1989–1993	Fort Lauderdale Strikers		
1990–1992	Canton Invaders (outdoor)		
1997	Charlotte Eagles		
1999	Charlotte Eagles	13	(0)
- * Club domestic league appearances and goals

John Clare is an American soccer coach. He played professionally in the American Professional Soccer League and National Professional Soccer League.

Clare, the father of Matt Clare, attended the College of Boca Raton, playing on the men's soccer team from 1986 to 1988. In 1989, Clare turned professional with the Fort Lauderdale Strikers of the American Soccer League. At the end of the ASL season, Clare moved to Germany where he trained, but played no league matches, with the Werder Bremen reserve team. He was back with the Strikers in 1990 as the team played in the American Professional Soccer League which was formed by the merger of the American Soccer League and Western Soccer League that year. Clare remained with the Strikers through the 1993 season. In 1990, he also signed with the Canton Invaders of the National Professional Soccer League. He spent two seasons with Canton. Clare also played for the Charlotte Eagles of the USISL twice, the first time in 1997 and the second in 1999.

Clare coaches with Players Club of Tampa Bay in Brandon, Florida.
