= Matthew Maher (soccer) =

American soccer player (born 1984)

Personal information
- Full name: Matthew Joseph Maher
- Date of birth: April 13, 1984 (age 42)
- Place of birth: Cape May, New Jersey, U.S.
- Height: 5 ft 11 in (1.80 m)
- Position: Defender

College career
Years	Team	Apps	(Gls)
2003–2006	Temple Owls		

Senior career*
Years	Team	Apps	(Gls)
2004–2006	Ocean City Barons	38	(4)
2007	Carolina Railhawks	5	(0)
2007–08	New Jersey Ironmen (indoor)	13	(1)
2009	Philadelphia KiXX (indoor)	5	(0)
- * Club domestic league appearances and goals

Matthew Maher (born April 13, 1984) is an American retired soccer defender, who was sentenced to five and a half years in prison for first degree aggravated manslaughter and drunken driving after pleading guilty in court on May 7, 2009. He was released from prison on August 3, 2014, and is currently living as a pastor.

== Youth ==
Maher grew up in the Cape May Court House section of Middle Township, New Jersey, playing youth soccer with the Cape Express Soccer Club. He attended Middle Township High School where he was First Team All-South Jersey and Third Team All-State his junior year having tallied 32 goals and 17 assists. While Maher played only seven games his senior year, he still scored 20 goals and added 11 assists, earning a scholarship offer from Temple University. Maher was also the starting point guard on the 2001–2002 Middle Township Panthers basketball team who won the Group II State Championship. Maher attended Temple University and was a four-year starter for the Owls and named to the All-Atlantic 10 Rookie Team his freshman year and team captain his senior year. He graduated with a bachelor's degree in legal studies.

== Professional ==
While in college, Maher also played as an amateur with the Ocean City Barons of the Premier Development League (PDL). He spent three seasons with the Barons and in the 2004 Lamar Hunt U.S. Open Cup, the Barons played against the Syracuse Salty Dogs. At the time, his brother Anthony Maher was with the Salty Dogs. In the spring of 2007, Miami FC picked Maher in the first round (ninth overall) of the USL College Draft. Maher elected to finish his degree which caused him to miss the 2007 USL pre-season. Following graduation from Temple, Maher moved to Cary, North Carolina to live with his brother, Anthony, who was now playing with the Carolina RailHawks. Maher trained with the RailHawks, eventually gaining a contract offer mid-season. Maher made his first professional start against Liga MX México Primera División side Cruz Azul. In 2007, the New Jersey Ironmen of Major Indoor Soccer League (MISL) drafted Maher with the second pick of the MISL College Draft. During the 2007–2008 season, he was a Defensive Player of the Week, making him the first rookie to earn POTW honors. He scored his first career MISL goal on January 5, 2008, vs. Detroit Ignition. On January 7, 2009, he signed a contract with the Philadelphia KiXX of the newly formed NISL. At the time, his brother, Anthony Maher, also played for the KiXX. On March 1, 2009, Maher blew out his knee.

On March 7, 2009, Maher was driving drunk when he hit and killed Hort Kap. Maher was sentenced to five and a half years in prison in January 2010.

== Personal ==
Matthew is co-founder of "Maher Brothers Pro Touch Soccer Camp" (Maher Brothers Soccer LLC) in Cape May County.

In March 2009, Maher's sport utility vehicle crashed into the rear of a minivan on the Atlantic City Expressway, killing 55-year-old Hort Kap of Philadelphia. He was convicted on aggravated manslaughter charges and sentenced to 5 1/2 years in prison. Maher was released from prison on August 3, 2014, and immediately resumed his "Decisions Determine Destiny" assemblies funded by State Farm. This program has been presented to over 500,000 high school and college students to date.

Maher is also the Teaching Pastor at Landmark Church, Ocean City, NJ (formerly known as Coastal Christian) as well as the host of the podcast, Rechurched, a podcast aimed at instigating Christians to be Christian. He authors a column, Truth Over Trend, for the Cape May County Herald.

Maher is a speaker for the 'Be Still Foundation,' a 501c3 non profit ministry, that is committed to advocating responsible decision making for the prevention of risky behaviors as well as prison ministry outreach.

While still in prison, Maher and his brothers founded a publishing company called 5511 Publishing based on Isaiah 55:11, "So is My word that goes from My mouth: It will not return to Me empty, but will accomplish what I desire and achieve the purpose for which I sent it." 5511 Publishing released the first of Maher's 14 books written while incarcerated. He is the author of the book(s): U MAY B THE ONLY BIBLE SOMEBODY READS: R U LEGIBLE?; Imprisoned by Peace: A View Apart; and Unchained: A Voice Apart (available on Amazon.com)

Matthew and his wife, Sarah, their daughter Willow, and son Ezekiel, reside in Egg Harbor Twp., NJ. He was granted time-served credits for 35 anti-drunken driving presentations he has made at schools and colleges since pleading guilty to aggravated manslaughter and drunken driving.
