= David Atkinson =

David Atkinson may refer to:

- David Atkinson (baritone) (1921–2012), Canadian actor and singer
- David Atkinson (bishop) (born 1943), British bishop and author
- David Atkinson (politician) (1940–2012), Conservative British Member of Parliament for Bournemouth East
- David W. Atkinson (born 1948), Canadian academic and President of Grant MacEwan University
- David Rice Atchison (1807–1886), sometimes spelled Atkinson, United States senator
- David Atkinson (footballer) (born 1993), English footballer

== See also ==
- Atkinson (surname)
