= Anthony Maher (soccer) =

American soccer player (born 1979)

Personal information
- Full name: Anthony Maher
- Date of birth: March 18, 1979 (age 47)
- Place of birth: Cape May, New Jersey, United States
- Height: 6 ft 1 in (1.85 m)
- Position: Forward

College career
Years	Team	Apps	(Gls)
1997–2001	Mercyhurst College (NCAA D-II)		(51)

Senior career*
Years	Team	Apps	(Gls)
2001	West Michigan Edge(USL-PDL)	18	(14)
2002	Wilmington Hammerheads(USL-Pro)	20	(15)
2002–2003	Cleveland Force (MISL)	35	(8)
2003–2005	Kansas City Comets (MISL)	48	(48)
2003–2004	Milwaukee(A-League)	16	(6)
2005–2006	Chicago Storm (MISL)	15	(8)
2004-2006	Syracuse Salty Dogs(A-League)	28	(9)
2006–2008	Milwaukee Wave (MISL)	45	(33)
2007–2008	Carolina RailHawks(USL-1)	19	(8)
2008–2010	Philadelphia KiXX (MISL)	45	(26)

International career
2002–2003	U.S. U-23	3	(1)
2007–2009	U.S. Futsal		
- * Club domestic league appearances and goals as of November 10, 2012

Anthony Maher (born March 18, 1979) was a professional soccer forward. Maher was a 10-year American professional outdoor and professional indoor soccer player and also a member of the United States National Futsal team and took part in the 2007 Pan-American Games in Brazil. Maher retired in 2013 and was inducted into the New Jersey Soccer Association Hall of Fame. Maher currently holds a USSF A Pro coaching license.

== Amateur ==
He played high school soccer at Middle Township High School in New Jersey. While in college was a member of the USL Premier Development League (PDL) with the West Michigan Edge and set franchise records for goals (14) and points (34 points) and was named to the 2001 All PDL team.

== College ==
Maher attended Mercyhurst College on an athletic scholarship. He was a 2001 NSCAA First Team All-American and runner up for NCAA DII National Player of the Year. He was additionally, a four-time All-GLIAC selection including Two-Time Conference Player of the Year and All Time Goal Scorer in Mercyhurst College history. He was captain of the team and led Mercyhurst to two Division II NSCAA Final Fours. While in college was a member of the USL Premier Development League (PDL) with the West Michigan Edge and set franchise records for goals (14) and points (34 points) and was named to the 2001 All PDL team. Maher was then 1 of 2 Division II players asked to take part in the MLS Combine. Maher is one of only three players in Mercyhurst College men's soccer program inducted into Mercyhurst College Athletics Hall of Fame.

== Professional career ==
Anthony Maher started his professional soccer career with the Wilmington Hammerheads of the USL Second Division in 2002. He was the Hammerhead's team MVP and an All League selection his rookie season, leading the team to the National Championship Game. That fall, Maher joined the Cleveland Force of Major Indoor Soccer League (MISL). He was the 'Team Rookie of the Year' and also selected to the All League Rookie First Team. In 2003, the Force traded Maher to the Kansas City Comets in exchange for Nick Corneli. Maher was named the Comets' "Newcomer of the Year" producing 28 goals and 10 assists. He followed that with 20 goals and 5 assists in only 14 games his second season with the Comets before tearing his anterior cruciate ligament (ACL). The Comets folded at the end of the 2004–2005 season and Maher signed with the Milwaukee of the USL A-League, playing one season with them. In 2006, Maher signed with the A-League team Syracuse Salty Dogs where he was the Teams's Offensive Player of the Year and the Army Man of the Year for high work rate. The Salty Dogs folded at the end of the season and Maher moved to the Rochester Raging Rhinos. However, he never played for Rochester due to a torn anterior cruciate ligament. In 2007, Maher signed with the Carolina RailHawks of the USL First Division, where he scored the team's only goal in the semifinal loss to the New England Revolution in the 2007 Lamar Hunt U.S. Open Cup. At the end of the season, Maher was brought in by Chivas USA of the MLS and then released. In 2008, Maher joined the Philadelphia KiXX where he played for two seasons.

== Personal ==
Maher was a spokesperson for Athletes in Action as well as sponsored nationally by Powerbar as a 2008 and 2009 TEAM ELITE MEMBER. He founded the Maher Brother's Pro Touch Soccer Camps that run camp programs in southern New Jersey. Maher has also been nominated for 2008 induction into South Jersey Soccer Hall of Fame. Maher's father, John Maher, was a top NJ HS coach and also inducted into the South Jersey Soccer Hall of fame in 2018. Anthony is married to a former Wayne State College Women's Soccer player Anne Marie Collins.

His brother, Matthew Maher, former Temple University Men's Soccer Captain, in the spring of 2007, Miami FC picked Maher in the first round (ninth overall) of the College Draft. Matthew also played for the Philadelphia KiXX & NJ Ironmen in the MISL and had also played alongside Anthony with the Carolina RailHawks (USL-1)during the 2007 season. Anthony and Matt were the first brothers to play against each other in the Lamar Hunt US Open Cup. His other brother, Michael, captained the midshipman at the US Naval Academy competing in the Patriot League NCAA Division I.
