= Doug Shaw Memorial Stadium =

Stadium in Myrtle Beach, South Carolina

Coordinates: 33.715421°N 78.866526°W

- Interactive map of Doug Shaw Memorial Stadium
- Full name: Doug Shaw Memorial Stadium
- Location: Myrtle Beach, SC
- Owner: City of Myrtle Beach & County of Horry
- Capacity: 6,500

Construction
- Built: 1968
- Opened: 1968

Tenants
- Myrtle Beach HS Seahawks; Myrtle Beach FC

Doug Shaw Memorial Stadium is a 6,500-capacity multi-use stadium located in Myrtle Beach, South Carolina. The stadium is named for Doug Shaw, Sr., the long-time coach of the Myrtle Beach High School Seahawks football team. During his reign on the sidelines, his Seahawk teams went to the AAA state championship game five years in a row, winning the title four times. The stadium is used for football, soccer, and track & field. It is the main venue for rectangular sports in Myrtle Beach but has been displaced by Brooks Stadium as the largest stadium in Horry County for those sports. It remains the county's premiere track & field venue.

The field surface is FieldTurf.
