= Ryan Walker (soccer) =

American soccer player

Personal information
- Date of birth: November 4, 1974 (age 51)
- Place of birth: Rapid City, South Dakota, United States
- Height: 5 ft 11 3/4 in (1.82 m)
- Position: Forward

Youth career
- 1992–1993: Sacramento State Hornets
- 1994–1996: Coastal Carolina Chanticleers

Senior career*
Years	Team	Apps	(Gls)
1997–1998	Myrtle Beach Seadawgs	?	(13)
1999	Wilmington Hammerheads	17	(14)
1999	→ Charleston Battery (loan)	1	(1)
2000	Raleigh Capital Express	28	(9)
2000	→ Wilmington Hammerheads (loan)	1	(0)
2001	Atlanta Silverbacks	26	(9)
- * Club domestic league appearances and goals

Ryan Walker is a retired American soccer forward who played professionally in the USL A-League.

In 1993, Walker began his college career at Sacramento State University. In 1995, he transferred to Coastal Carolina University. In his two seasons at Coastal Carolina, he scored twenty-six goals, adding fifteen assists, in forty games. In February 1997, the Charleston Battery selected Walker in the Territorial round of the 1997 A-League Draft. Walker did not join Charleston, but signed with the Myrtle Beach Seadawgs of the USISL D-3 Pro League instead. When David Irving, head coach of the Seadawgs moved to the Wilmington Hammerheads in 1999, Walker made the move as well. He was First Team All League that season. The Hammerheads sent Walker on loan to the Charleston Battery for the Battery's final regular season game. In 2000, Walker moved up to the Raleigh Capital Express of the USL A-League. Raleigh ceased operations at the end of the season and in February 2001, Walker moved to the Atlanta Silverbacks where he finished his career.
