= University Soccer Stadium, Chico =

Soccer stadium at California State University, Chico

University Soccer Stadium
- Interactive map of University Soccer Stadium
- Address: West Sacramento Avenue
- Location: Chico, California, U.S.
- Coordinates: 39°43′56″N 121°51′14″W
- Owner: California State University, Chico
- Operator: California State University, Chico
- Capacity: 2,500 (current); 4,000 (2001)
- Surface: Natural grass

Construction
- Opened: 2001

Tenants
- Chico State Wildcats soccer (NCAA, 2001-); Chico Rooks soccer (USL PDL, 2001-2006)

University Soccer Stadium is a soccer-specific stadium located on the campus of California State University, Chico in Chico, California.

The stadium opened in 2001 with a capacity of 4,000. After renovations, the stadium now seats 2,500. In addition to hosting the university's men's and women's soccer teams, the stadium was home to the Chico Rooks soccer team from 2001 to 2006.
