= San Antonio Pumas =

The San Antonio Pumas were an American soccer team founded in 1988 as the San Antonio Heat in the original indoor SISL league. They became the San Antonio Generals before the 1989/90 indoor season and then the San Antonio Pumas before the 1993 outdoor season. They folded after the 1998 season.

== History ==
=== San Antonio Heat ===
In 1988, the San Antonio Heat entered the Southwest Indoor Soccer League for the 1988–89 indoor season. The Heat were placed in the Central Division with the Austin Sockadillos and Houston Express. Despite finishing third in the division, they gained a wild card berth in the playoffs where they lost to the Houston Express in the first round. The team was less successful during the 1989 outdoor season as they finished sixth and well out of play off contention.

=== San Antonio Generals ===
In the fall of 1989, the team came under new management and was renamed the Generals. It began the 1989–1990 indoor season as a "provisional" team. This meant that all its games would count only as exhibition games. However, when the Houston Express was suspended by the league, the Generals replaced them. In the summer of 1990, the Generals finished third in the Eastern Division but lost to the Austin Sockadillos in the first round of the playoffs. The Generals then had a disastrous indoor season as they went 0–20, scoring 62 goals and letting in 227. The team recovered during the 1991 outdoor season, finishing 8–8, but out of playoff contention. This trend continued as the Generals finished 7–7 during the 1991–1992 indoor season, then mid table during the 1992 outdoor season. In 1992, Randall Schulze purchased the team. San Antonio spent one last season, the 1992–1993 indoor season, as the Generals, once again finishing at 6–6 and out of play off contention.

=== San Antonio Pumas ===
In the spring of 1993, the team was renamed the Pumas. Under head coach Mario Degl'Innocenti, the team again finished even at 8–8 during the 1993 outdoor season. That season, they played eight home games at Blossom Athletic Center and one at Harlandale Memorial Stadium. In 1994, the Pumas owner, Randall Schulze, brought in Hisham Alisaleh as head coach and moved the team up to the USISL D-3 Pro League. The team continued to play its home games at the Blossom Athletic Center. This season, the Pumas saw an improvement in form, finishing at 11–7, only to fall to the DFW Toros in the first round of the playoffs. The team entered the 1995 season little changed from 1994 and improved to 13–7 only to fall in the first round of the playoffs yet again, this time to the El Paso Patriots. However, the team did experience some controversy when the owner released three starters at mid-season after the three players confronted Schulze regarding pay and work issues. At the time, the team had five injured players. This led to another player leaving the team immediately and two more who left a few days later. In April 1996, Dave Masterson took ownership of the team after Schulze filed for bankruptcy. Masterson brought in George Price as head coach and the team played their home games at the University of the Incarnate Word Stadium. In June 1996, Price left the team for a few weeks. In his absence, assistant coach Lance Noble served as interim head coach. In 1997, the team began the season with a new owner, Edward C. Nicholson. The team also returned to Harlandale Memorial Stadium. Unfortunately, Nicholson repeated the financial problems of the previous seasons as he missed pay days for the players and coaches. He also failed to acquire liability insurance which led to the cancellation of one game. In mid-June 1997, Giovanni De Avila, head of the America of Houston Corporation, purchased the team from Nicholson. He paid all of the Pumas debts and brought in Mexican World Cup player Francisco Javier Cruz However, De Avila was late with payments to Harlandale Memorial Stadium which led to the Pumas moving to Fox Tech High School at mid-season. As the team continued to search for a suitable stadium, the coach ordered the players to leave the field in the second half of a July 28, 1996 game against the Austin Lone Stars. Despite the turmoil, the team finished the season at 7–10 which put them into the playoffs. In the first game of the playoffs, which the Pumas won 4–3 over the Texas Toros, Francisco Javier Cruz, now head coach, was arrested after charging onto the field to confront a referee. A few days later, the team was forced to forfeit the game when the league discovered it had used a player not listed on the game day roster. In April 1999, Da Avila transferred ownership of the Pumas to former coach Guillermo Espinosa. This was too late to allow Espinosa to enter the team into the USISL for the 1999 season, but intended to return in 2000. Financial difficulties prevented him from doing so and the team ceased operations.

== Year-by-year ==
Year	Division	League	Reg. season	Playoffs	Open Cup
1988/89	N/A	SISL Indoor	3rd, South	1st Round	N/A
1989	N/A	SISL	6th	Did not qualify	Did not enter
1989/90	N/A	SISL Indoor	5th, Texas	Did not qualify	N/A
1990	N/A	SISL	3rd, Eastern	Quarterfinals	Did not enter
1990/91	N/A	SISL Indoor	9th, Southwest	Did not qualify	N/A
1991	N/A	SISL	4th, Tex-Oma	Did not qualify	Did not enter
1991/92	N/A	USISL Indoor	4th, Tex-Oma	Did not qualify	N/A
1992	N/A	USISL	4th, South Central	Did not qualify	Did not enter
1992/93	N/A	USISL Indoor	3rd, South Central	Did not qualify	N/A
1993	N/A	USISL	4th, South Central	Did not qualify	Did not enter
1994	3	USISL	3rd, South Central	Divisional Semifinals	Did not enter
1995	3	USISL Pro League	4th, South Central	Divisional Semifinals	Did not qualify
1996	3	USISL Pro League	4th, Central	Did not qualify	Did not qualify
1997	3	USISL D-3 Pro League	5th, South Central	Division Finals	Did not qualify
1998	3	USISL D-3 Pro League	3rd, South Central	Division Semifinals	Did not qualify

== Coaches ==
- Parker Cowand
- "Big" Bill Anderson
- Mario Degl'Innocenti (1993)
- Hisham Alisaleh (1994 – 1995)
- George Price (1996)
- Lance Noble (1996 – interim)
- Guillermo Espinosa (1997)
- Janio Cabezas (1998)
- Francisco Javier Cruz (1998)

== Notable players ==
- (Mexico) Francisco Javier Cruz
- (United States) Marco Ferruzzi
- (United States) Edward "Eddie" Kaufman
- (United States) Patrick "Pat" Picardo
