= Ryan Leib =

American soccer player

Personal information
- Date of birth: September 15, 1972 (age 54)
- Place of birth: Delaware, United States
- Height: 5 ft 11 in (1.80 m)
- Position: Midfielder

Youth career
- 1991–1994: New Hampshire Wildcats

Senior career*
Years	Team	Apps	(Gls)
1995–1996	Hampton Roads Mariners		
1997–2001	Charlotte Eagles		
2002	Atlanta Silverbacks	21	(2)
2003	Charlotte Eagles	1	(0)
- * Club domestic league appearances and goals

Ryan Leib is an American retired soccer midfielder who played professionally in the USL A-League.

== Youth ==
Born in Pennsylvania, Leib grew up in Farmington, Maine where his father, Robert Leib, coached the University of Maine soccer and baseball teams. Although he was an All State high school soccer player, Leib was unrecruited by college coaches. Therefore, rather than graduate after his senior year of high school, Leib decided to attend the Kent School in Kent, Connecticut in order to play one more year of high school sports. This brought Leib to the attention of several colleges in New England. Leib eventually chose the University of New Hampshire, playing on the school's soccer team from 1991 to 1994. He is second on the school's career goals list and third on the career assists list. Leib graduated with a bachelor's degree in kinesiology.

== Professional ==
In 1995, Leib turned professional with the Hampton Roads Mariners of the USISL Pro League. In 1996, the Mariners played in the USISL Select League. The Mariners released Leib halfway through the 1996 season. In 1997, the Charlotte Eagles of the USISL D-3 Pro League contacted Lieb about his playing for them. Leib went on to spend five seasons with the Eagles. In 1999, he was All League. In 2000, the Eagles won the D-3 Pro League championship. In 2001, Charlotte moved up to the USL A-League. In December 2001, Leib signed with the Atlanta Silverbacks for the 2002 season. In 2003, Leib returned to the Charlotte Eagles for one game, then retired.
