= Chico Rooks =

American soccer team in 1990s and 2000s

- Full name: Chico Rooks
- Nickname: The Rooks
- Founded: 1993
- Dissolved: 2007
- Ground: University Stadium
- Capacity: 4,000
- Chairman: (United States) David Stahl
- Manager: (United States) David Stahl
- League: National Premier Soccer League
- 2006: 5th, Northwest Division
Home colours	Away colours

The Chico Rooks were an American soccer team, founded in 1993 by Dave Stahl and Eric Snedeker. The team was a member of the National Premier Soccer League (NPSL), the fourth tier of the American Soccer Pyramid, until 2006. Initially, the team's management announced that they would spend the 2007 NPSL season on hiatus while they re-organised and consolidated their finances; the Rooks never returned to active competition and the franchise was cancelled by the NPSL at the end of the 2007 season.

The Rooks were a stalwart of the United Soccer Leagues from their formation in 1993 until 2003, where upon they were founding members of the Men's Premier Soccer League (now the National Premier Soccer League). For many years they were California's oldest professional soccer club.

The Rooks played in four different stadiums at local high schools and colleges before getting a permanent home stadium in 2001. From 2001 on, the Rooks played their home matches at the University Stadium on the campus of California State University, Chico in the city of Chico, California. The team's colors were black and white.

== Final roster ==
Note: Flags indicate national team as defined under FIFA eligibility rules; some limited exceptions apply. Players may hold more than one non-FIFA nationality.

No.	Pos.	Nation	Player
0	GK	USA	Nick Clark
1	GK	USA	Brandon Hearron
2	DF	USA	Donnie Ribaudo
3	DF	USA	Robby Busick
4	DF	USA	Michael Elenz-Martin
5	MF	USA	Brian Frederick
6	DF	USA	Anthony Putras
7	MF	BRA	Joao Macedo
8	MF	USA	Joe Munoz
9	FW	USA	Keith Ratzburg
10	FW	NCA	Luis Orellana
11	MF	USA	Martin Boczkowski
12	FW	USA	Mario Castillo

No.	Pos.	Nation	Player
13	DF	USA	Todd Simmons
14	FW	ENG	Nick Hooper
15	MF	ROU	Tiberiu Marinescu
16	FW	USA	John Doran
17	MF	CHI	German Campos
18	MF	USA	Kevin Kuiper
19	DF	USA	Ben Gatenbein
20	FW	USA	Brett Williams
21	FW	IND	Ranvir Singh
23	DF	NOR	Roger Davanger
24	DF	USA	Josh Copeland
25	FW	USA	Jamie Wilhite
00	GK	USA	Nico Arellano
99	FW	USA	Ryan Grange

== Year-by-year ==
Year	Division	League	Reg. season	Playoffs	Open Cup
1993		USISL	4th, Pacific	Divisional Semifinals	Did not enter
1994	3	USISL	4th, Pacific	Sizzling Nine	Did not enter
1995	3	USISL Pro League	2nd, Western North	1st Round	Quarterfinals
1996	3	USISL Pro League	4th, Western	Semifinals	Did not qualify
1997	3	USISL D-3 Pro League	3rd, West	Division Finals	Did not qualify
1998	3	USISL D-3 Pro League	2nd, West	Division Semifinals	Did not qualify
1999	3	USL D-3 Pro League	1st, Western	Semifinals	1st Round
2000	3	USL D-3 Pro League	1st, Western	Conference Semifinals	Did not qualify
2001	3	USL D-3 Pro League	2nd, Western	Conference Semifinals	2nd Round
2002	4	USL PDL	1st, Southwest	Did not qualify	1st Round
2003	4	MPSL	2nd	Semifinals	1st Round
2004	4	MPSL	1st	Semifinals	1st Round
2005	4	NPSL	3rd, Western	Did not qualify	Did not qualify
2006	4	NPSL	5th, Northwest	Did not qualify	Did not qualify

== Honors ==
- MPSL Regular Season Champions 2004
- USL PDL Southwest Division Champions 2002
- USL D-3 Pro League Western Division Champions 2000
- USL D-3 Pro League Western Division Champions 1999

== Coaches ==
- (United States) David Stahl (1993–2006)
- (United States) Eric Snedeker (1993–2006)

== Stadium ==
- University Soccer Stadium, Chico

== Average Attendance ==
- 1993: 1,012
- 1994: 1,181
- 1995: 1,490
- 1996: 1,449
- 1997: 1,933
- 1998: 1,624
- 1999: 1,709
- 2000: 1,710
- 2001: 2,109
- 2002: 1,691
- 2003: 1,656
- 2004: 1,573
