= 1998 USISL D-3 Pro League =

USISL D-3 Pro League
- Season: 1998
- Champions: Chicago Stingers (1st Title)
- Regular Season title: Miami Breakers (1st Title)
- Relegated: Central Jersey Riptide; Miami Breakers; NYCD Alleycats; Orlando Nighthawks; Vermont Voltage
- Matches: 350
- Goals: 1,389 (3.97 per match)
- Best Player: (Nicaragua) Luis Orellana Chico Rooks
- Top goalscorer: (Liberia) Michael Butler Western Mass Pioneers (Nicaragua) Luis Orellana Chico Rooks (15 Goals Each)
- Best goalkeeper: (United States) Daniel Britton Roanoke Wrath

The 1998 USISL D-3 Pro League was the 12th season of third-division soccer in the United States, and was the second season of now-defunct USISL D-3 Pro League. The champions were the Chicago Stingers who beat the New Hampshire Phantoms in the final.

== Changes from 1996 ==
Before the season, Western Massachusetts, Northern Virginia, and Pensacola were added. Baltimore became Eastern Shore. Dallas became Texas. Vermont became the Voltage. Miami was promoted from PDSL.

=== Name Changes ===
- Vermont Wanderers rebranded as Vermont Voltage
- Baltimore Bays rebranded as Eastern Shore Sharks
- Dallas Toros rebranded as Texas Toros

=== New Clubs ===
| Team name | Metro area | Location | Previous affiliation |
|---|---|---|---|
| (Florida) Miami Breakers | South Florida | Miami, FL | promoted from PDSL |
| Northern Virginia Royals | Northern Virginia | Manassas, VA | expansion |
| (Florida) Pensacola Barracudas | Pensacola area | Pensacola, FL | expansion |
| (Massachusetts) Western Mass Pioneers | Springfield area | Ludlow, MA | expansion |

=== Folding or Moving ===
No teams left the league nor folded.

== Standings ==
=== Northeast Division ===
| Pos | Team | Pld | W | SW | SL | L | GF | GA | GD | Pts | Qualification or relegation |
|---|---|---|---|---|---|---|---|---|---|---|---|
| 1 | Rhode Island Stingrays | 18 | 11 | 0 | 0 | 7 | 39 | 33 | +6 | 33 | USISL Divisional Semifinals |
| 2 | New Hampshire Phantoms | 18 | 10 | 2 | 0 | 6 | 36 | 24 | +12 | 32 | USISL Divisional Semifinals |
| 3 | Western Mass Pioneers | 18 | 10 | 0 | 1 | 7 | 45 | 34 | +11 | 30 | USISL Divisional Semifinals |
| 4 | Cape Cod Crusaders | 18 | 7 | 0 | 0 | 11 | 23 | 28 | −5 | 21 | USISL Divisional Semifinals |
| 5 | Vermont Voltage | 18 | 2 | 1 | 1 | 14 | 15 | 43 | −28 | 6 (Note: 1 point deduction) | Relegation to the 1999 PDSL |

=== Mid-Atlantic Division ===
| Pos | Team | Pld | W | SW | SL | L | GF | GA | GD | Pts | Qualification or relegation |
|---|---|---|---|---|---|---|---|---|---|---|---|
| 1 | South Jersey Barons | 18 | 12 | 0 | 2 | 4 | 40 | 20 | +20 | 36 | USISL Divisional Semifinals |
| 2 | Reading Rage | 18 | 10 | 0 | 0 | 8 | 41 | 29 | +12 | 30 | USISL Divisional Semifinals |
| 3 | New Jersey Stallions | 18 | 10 | 0 | 1 | 7 | 37 | 24 | +13 | 30 | USISL Divisional Semifinals |
| 4 | Central Jersey Riptide | 18 | 8 | 3 | 1 | 6 | 33 | 19 | +14 | 27 | USISL Divisional Semifinals and relegation to the 1999 PDSL |
| 5 | NYCD Alleycats | 18 | 5 | 0 | 0 | 13 | 19 | 36 | −17 | 15 | Relegation to the 1999 PDSL |

=== Atlantic Division ===
| Pos | Team | Pld | W | SW | SL | L | GF | GA | GD | Pts | Qualification |
|---|---|---|---|---|---|---|---|---|---|---|---|
| 1 | Delaware Wizards | 18 | 13 | 1 | 2 | 2 | 43 | 16 | +27 | 40 | USISL Divisional Finals |
| 2 | Myrtle Beach Seadawgs | 18 | 12 | 1 | 0 | 5 | 42 | 26 | +16 | 37 | USISL Divisional Finals |
| 3 | Charlotte Eagles | 18 | 10 | 1 | 1 | 6 | 47 | 31 | +16 | 31 | USISL Divisional Semifinals |
| 4 | Roanoke Wrath | 18 | 10 | 0 | 2 | 6 | 36 | 19 | +17 | 30 | USISL Divisional Semifinals |
| 5 | South Carolina Shamrocks | 18 | 8 | 1 | 1 | 8 | 34 | 32 | +2 | 25 | USISL Divisional Semifinals |
| 6 | Wilmington Hammerheads | 18 | 8 | 0 | 0 | 10 | 33 | 34 | −1 | 24 | |
| 7 | Northern Virginia Royals | 18 | 5 | 1 | 0 | 12 | 28 | 46 | −18 | 16 | |
| 8 | Eastern Shore Sharks | 18 | 0 | 0 | 0 | 18 | 16 | 90 | −74 | 0 | |

=== Southeast Division ===
| Pos | Team | Pld | W | SW | SL | L | GF | GA | GD | Pts |
|---|---|---|---|---|---|---|---|---|---|---|
| 1 | Miami Breakers | 18 | 17 | 0 | 0 | 1 | 67 | 21 | +46 | 51 |
| 2 | Orlando Nighthawks | 18 | 12 | 0 | 0 | 6 | 62 | 33 | +29 | 36 |
| 3 | Southwest Florida Manatees | 18 | 8 | 0 | 1 | 9 | 34 | 57 | −23 | 24 |
| 4 | Pensacola Barracudas | 18 | 4 | 1 | 1 | 12 | 21 | 57 | −36 | 13 |
| 5 | Tallahassee Tempest | 18 | 2 | 0 | 0 | 16 | 12 | 41 | −29 | 6 |

=== North Central Division ===
| Pos | Team | Pld | W | SW | SL | L | GF | GA | GD | Pts |
|---|---|---|---|---|---|---|---|---|---|---|
| 1 | Indiana Blast | 18 | 15 | 0 | 0 | 3 | 57 | 24 | +33 | 45 |
| 2 | Chicago Stingers | 18 | 13 | 0 | 1 | 4 | 37 | 16 | +21 | 39 |
| 3 | Rockford Raptors | 18 | 9 | 1 | 2 | 6 | 31 | 25 | +6 | 28 |
| 4 | Cleveland Caps | 18 | 9 | 1 | 0 | 8 | 33 | 41 | −8 | 28 |

=== South Central Division ===
| Pos | Team | Pld | W | SW | SL | L | GF | GA | GD | Pts |
|---|---|---|---|---|---|---|---|---|---|---|
| 1 | Austin Lone Stars | 18 | 13 | 0 | 1 | 4 | 46 | 20 | +26 | 39 |
| 2 | Texas Toros | 18 | 12 | 1 | 0 | 5 | 44 | 24 | +20 | 37 |
| 3 | San Antonio Pumas | 17 | 7 | 0 | 0 | 10 | 26 | 44 | −18 | 21 |
| 4 | Tulsa Roughnecks | 18 | 6 | 1 | 0 | 11 | 33 | 44 | −11 | 16 (Note: 3 point deduction) |
| 5 | Houston Hurricanes | 17 | 4 | 2 | 2 | 9 | 25 | 36 | −11 | 14 |
| 6 | Shreveport/Bossier Lions | 18 | 4 | 0 | 0 | 14 | 24 | 50 | −26 | 6 (Note: 6 point deduction) |

=== West Division ===
| Pos | Team | Pld | W | SW | SL | L | GF | GA | GD | Pts |
|---|---|---|---|---|---|---|---|---|---|---|
| 1 | Arizona Sahuaros | 18 | 14 | 0 | 0 | 4 | 67 | 28 | +39 | 42 |
| 2 | Chico Rooks | 18 | 10 | 1 | 2 | 5 | 39 | 28 | +11 | 31 |
| 3 | Stanislaus County Cruisers | 18 | 12 | 1 | 0 | 5 | 51 | 25 | +26 | 37 |
| 4 | Los Angeles Fireballs | 18 | 5 | 1 | 1 | 11 | 21 | 37 | −16 | 16 |
| 5 | San Fernando Valley Golden Eagles | 18 | 5 | 0 | 1 | 12 | 29 | 51 | −22 | 15 |
| 6 | Reno Rattlers | 18 | 3 | 1 | 0 | 14 | 23 | 52 | −29 | 10 |

== Playoffs ==
=== Divisional Semifinals ===
Higher seed/home team on the left.

August 1, 1998

| Texas Toros | 3–4 (OT) | San Antonio Pumas |
|---|---|---|
| | | Martin Evans |

Old Panther Field, Duncanville, Texas
August 1, 1998

| Austin Lone Stars | 4–2 | Houston Hurricanes |
|---|---|---|
| Bryan Pearce 38'; Kerwin Johnson 26:45', 62:34'; Judd Willmann 77:20' | | 52:05', 62:34' Gustavo Gongora |

House Park, Austin, Texas
August 14, 1998
7:30 PM

| Roanoke Wrath | 5–2 | South Carolina Shamrocks |
|---|---|---|
| Ian Spooner 45'; Patrick McSorley 45'; Joseph McGowan | | 28' Jerome Lee-Yaw; Adel LePal |

Victory Stadium, Roanoke, Virginia
August 14, 1998

| Chicago Stingers | 3–0 | Rockford Raptors |
|---|---|---|
| Mike Dunne 37'; Matt Hamnett 84', 90' | Report |

Forest View Park, Arlington Heights, Illinois
August 15, 1998
7:00 PM

| Rhode Island Stingrays | 5–2 | Cape Cod Crusaders |
|---|---|---|
| Jose DaSilva (yellow card) 8'; Paulo Dos Santos 14' (yellow card) 54'; Emanuel Brito (yellow card) 29'; Mark Manganelo 55', 87'; Bjorn Hansen 63'; Paul deCastro (red card) 83'; Centeno 89' | Report | Jeff Doyle 6', 72'; Enzo Silva (yellow card) 25'; Kenneth Risley (red card) 73' |

Pierce Memorial Field, East Providence, Rhode Island
Attendance: 600
August 15, 1998

| New Hampshire Phantoms | 2–1 (OT) (a.e.t.) | Western Mass Pioneers |
|---|---|---|
| Ron Murphy 29'; Marcelo Tapia 92' | Report 1 Report 2 | 7' Chris Legowski |

Singer Family Park, Manchester, New Hampshire
Attendance: 2000+ or 1,002
Referee: Chip Reid
August 15, 1998
5:00 PM

| South Jersey Barons | 2–3 (OT) (a.e.t.) | Central Jersey Riptide |
|---|---|---|
| Michael Payne 2', 50'; Matt Miles (red card) | Report | 55', 90' (pen.) Gerson Echeverry; 92:20' Nansha Kalonji |

Carey Stadium, Ocean City, New Jersey
Attendance: 1,168
Referee: Matt Lawlor
August 15, 1998

| Charlotte Eagles | 4–0 | Wilmington Hammerheads |
|---|---|---|
| Ryan Leib 9'; Jon Payne 42'; Jamie Wellington 49'; Jason Webb | Report |

Richardson Stadium, Davidson, North Carolina
August 15, 1998

| Orlando Nighthawks | 6–2 | Southwest Florida Manatees |
|---|---|---|
| Jody DeBruin 68:47', 70:08'; Steve Freeman 84:38' (pen.), 86:42' (pen.); David Mackey 87:40'; Matthew Froehle 89:48' | Report | 26:40' Neal Wolfrath; 89:23' (pen.) Mendez |

Edgewater H.S. Stadium, Orlando, Florida
August 15, 1998

| Arizona Sahuaros | 3–0 | Los Angeles Fireballs |
|---|---|---|
| Aaron Muth 47'; Harold Calvo 75'; Kenny Wright 79' | Report |

Scottsdale Stadium, Scottsdale, Arizona
Attendance: 1,723
August 15, 1998

| Stanislaus County Cruisers | 3–2 | Chico Rooks |
|---|---|---|
| Curt Cox 49'; Joe Owen 66'; Marek Nowacki 79'; Mike Pepe (yellow card) | | (yellow card) 22' (yellow-red card) Jojo Stuart; 59' Felipe Ternero; 76' Joel Hurd |

Central Catholic High School, Modesto, California
Attendance: 2,140
August 16, 1998

| Reading Rage | 5–2 | New Jersey Stallions |
|---|---|---|
| Steve Thomas 45', 89:50'; Brent Fenstermacher 51'; George Crampton 80'; Drew Kauffmann 86' | | 18' Peter Villegas; 78' Carlos Vasco |

Fleetwood H.S. Stadium, Fleetwood, Pennsylvania

=== Division Finals ===
- Austin defeated Texas 1-0
- Charlotte defeated Myrtle Beach, 8-3
- Delaware defeated Roanoke, 2-1
- New Hampshire defeated Rhode Island, 3-2
- Chicago defeated Indiana, 3-0
- Central Jersey defeated Reading, 3-0
- Arizona defeated Stanislaus County 2-1
South Central Division Final
August 8, 1998
7:30 PM

| Austin Lone Stars | 1–0 | Texas Toros |
|---|---|---|
| Gabe Jones 79' | Report |

House Park, Austin, Texas

Atlantic Division Final 1
August 20, 1998
7:30 PM

| Myrtle Beach Seadawgs | 3–8 | Charlotte Eagles |
|---|---|---|
| Ryan Walker 45'; Jeremy Eason 60:50', 63' | Report | 35', 53', 53', 75' Jamie Wellington; 39', 60' Jon Payne; 39' Dustin Swincharr; 79:30' Jeremy Sorzano |

Doug Shaw Memorial Stadium, Myrtle Beach, South Carolina

North Central Division Final
August 21, 1998
7:30 PM CDT

| Indiana Blast | 0–3 | Chicago Stingers |
|---|---|---|
| | Report | 43:35' Joe Carver; 68:50' Michael Richardson; 83:50' Jason Acres |

Kuntz Stadium, Indianapolis, Indiana
Attendance: 3,218

Southeast Division Final
August 22, 1998
7:30 PM

| Miami Breakers | 0–1 | Orlando Nighthawks |
|---|---|---|
| Ted Storm (yellow card) 1' (yellow-red card) 33' | Report | 82' Matthew Froehle; (red card) 89' Elsherbini |

Flamingo Park Memorial Stadium, Miami Beach, Florida

Mid-Atlantic Division Final
August 22, 1998
7:30 PM

| Reading Rage | 0–3 | Central Jersey Riptide |
|---|---|---|
| | Report 1 Report 2 | 0:45', 71' Gerson Echeverry; 68' Nansha Kalonji |

Central Catholic High School Stadium, Reading, Pennsylvania
Attendance: 2,016

Atlantic Division Final 2
August 22, 1998
7:30 PM

| Delaware Wizards | 2–1 (a.e.t.) | Roanoke Wrath |
|---|---|---|
| Josh Quinter 86' | Report | 74' Grayson Prillaman |
Penalties
| Tarik Walker (penalty scored); Todd Hicks (penalty scored); Raul Ovalle (penalty scored) | 3–2 | (penalty scored) Patrick McSorley |

Randy White Alumni Field, New Castle, Delaware
Attendance: 1,000+
Referee: Craig Lowery

Northeast Division Final
August 22, 1998
7:30 PM

| Rhode Island Stingrays | 2–3 | New Hampshire Phantoms |
|---|---|---|
| Javier Centeno (yellow card) 22'; Mark Manganello (yellow card) 38'; David Demello (yellow card) 48'; Jose DaSilva (yellow card) 52'; Bjørn Hansen 74'; Cecilio Rodrigues 78' | Report | (yellow card) 19' Keiran O'Brien; (yellow card) 38' James DeDeus; 41' (yellow card) 46' Ron Murphy; 58' Richard Fleming; 72' Marcelo Tapia |

Pierce Memorial Field, East Providence, Rhode Island
Attendance: 2,135
Referee: Ed Resendes

West Division Final
August 22, 1998
7:30 PM

| Arizona Sahuaros | 2–1 | Stanislaus County Cruisers |
|---|---|---|
| Alex Pogman 59'; Harold Calvo 85' | Report | 79' Kurt Cox |

Scottsdale Stadium, Scottsdale, Arizona
Attendance: 1,000

=== Quarterfinals/Regional Finals ===
- New Hampshire defeated Central Jersey, 3-0
- Chicago defeated Delaware 1-0
- Orlando defeated Charlotte, 3-2
- Austin defeated Arizona 1-0
August 28, 1998

| Arizona Sahuaros | 0–1 | Austin Lone Stars |
|---|---|---|
| | | 65' Gabe Jones |

Scottsdale Stadium, Scottsdale, Arizona

August 29, 1998
4:30 PM

| Chicago Stingers | 1–0 | Delaware Wizards |
|---|---|---|
| Joe Carver 59' | Report |

Forest View Park, Arlington Heights, Illinois
Attendance: 2,029

August 29, 1998
5:30 PM

| Charlotte Eagles | 2–3 (OT) | Orlando Nighthawks |
|---|---|---|
| Jamie Wellington 13', 62' | Report | 19' Rod Levy; 92' Matthew Froehle |

Richardson Stadium, Davidson, North Carolina

East Regional Final
August 29, 1998
7:30 PM

| New Hampshire Phantoms | 3–0 | Central Jersey Riptide |
|---|---|---|
| Willy Schweitzer (yellow card) 4'; Marcelo Tapia 20'; Joe Ogbunamiri 42' (pen.) (yellow card) 68'; Thomas Dempsey (yellow card) 78'; Rich Fleming (yellow card) 86'; Jamie Williams 87' | Report |

Owl Stadium, Keene, New Hampshire
Attendance: 3,185
Referee: Richard Eddy

=== Semifinals ===
- Chicago defeated Orlando, 2-0
- New Hampshire defeated Austin, 3-2 (OT)
September 12, 1998
5:30 PM CDT

| Chicago Stingers | 2–0 | Orlando Nighthawks |
|---|---|---|
| Mike Richardson 70'; Max Stoka 89' | Report | (red card) 9' Frank Bresk |

Del Valle Stadium, Del Valle, Texas

September 12, 1998
8:00 PM CDT

| Austin Lone Stars | 2–3 (OT) | New Hampshire Phantoms |
|---|---|---|
| Bryan Pearce (yellow card) 21'; Gabe Jones (yellow card) 31'; Judd Willmann 36'; David Gilliam (yellow card) 44' (yellow-red card) 77'; Michael 'Scott' Champ (yellow card) 61'; Dennis Bryan (yellow card) 65'; Kerwin Johnson 79' | Report 1 Report 2 | 2:34' Rich Fleming; (yellow card) 6' Liam Lochhead; (yellow card) 31' (yellow-red card) 83' Thomas Dempsey; (red card) 34' Willy Schweitzer; (red card) 36' Suleyman Doenmez; 63' (pen.) Joel Ogbunamiri; 99:49' Jamie Williams |

Del Valle Stadium, Del Valle, Texas
Attendance: 1,763
Referee: Shane Moody

=== Championship ===
Chicago defeated New Hampshire, 3-2 (OT)

Third Place Match
September 13, 1998
4:30 PM CDT

| Austin Lone Stars | 2–3 | Orlando Nighthawks |
|---|---|---|
| Kerwin Johnson 19'; Judd Willman 70' | Report | 25' Robin Chan; 53', 75' Jose DeOlivera |

Del Valle Stadium, Del Valle, Texas
Attendance: 863

USISL D-3 Pro League Championship Game
September 13, 1998
7:00 PM CDT

| Chicago Stingers | 3–2 (OT) | New Hampshire Phantoms |
|---|---|---|
| Matt Hamnett 49' 94'; Chuck Codd 71'; Iain Williams (yellow card) 91' | Report 1 Report 2 | 2' Marcelo Tavilo Tapia; 10' (yellow card) 49' Ron Murphy; (yellow card) 48' Joel Ogbunamiri; (yellow card) 82' Thomas Dempsey |

Del Valle Stadium, Del Valle, Texas
Attendance: 897
Referee: Misail Tsapos

== Honors ==
- Organization of the Year: Indiana Blast
- Executive of the Year: Gary Mack, Stanislaus County Cruisers
- Fair Play Award: Charlotte Eagles
