= Oudin =

Oudin is a surname. Notable people with the surname include:

- César Oudin (c.1560–1625), French linguist and philologist
- Casimir Oudin (1638-1717), French monk and bibliographer
- Eugène Oudin (1858–1894), American baritone, composer and translator
- Manny Oudin (born 1968), American soccer coach and player
- Melanie Oudin (born 1991), American tennis player
- Paul Oudin (1851–1923), French doctor
