= Bernard de Montfaucon =

French Benedictine monk and scholar (1655–1741)

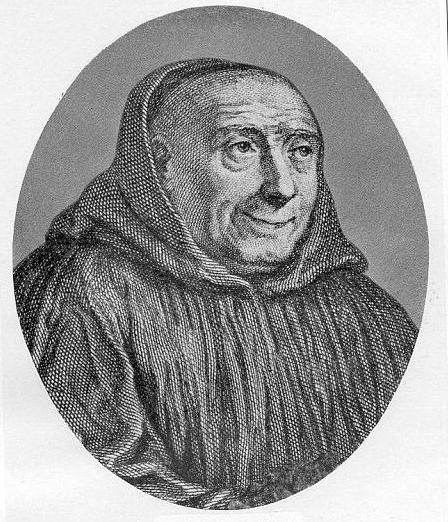
- Dom Bernard de Montfaucon, O.S.B.
- Born: 13 January 1655; Soulatgé, Languedoc, Kingdom of France
- Died: 21 December 1741 (aged 86); Paris, France

Dom Bernard de Montfaucon, O.S.B. (French: [də mɔ̃fokɔ̃]; 13 January 1655 – 21 December 1741) was a French Benedictine monk of the Congregation of Saint Maur. He was an astute scholar who founded the discipline of palaeography, as well as being an editor of works of the Fathers of the Church. He is regarded as one of the founders of the modern discipline of archaeology.

== Early life ==
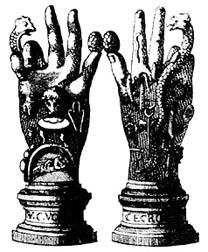
The Emblematic Hand of the Mysteries (in Antiquitas explanatione et schematibus illustrata)

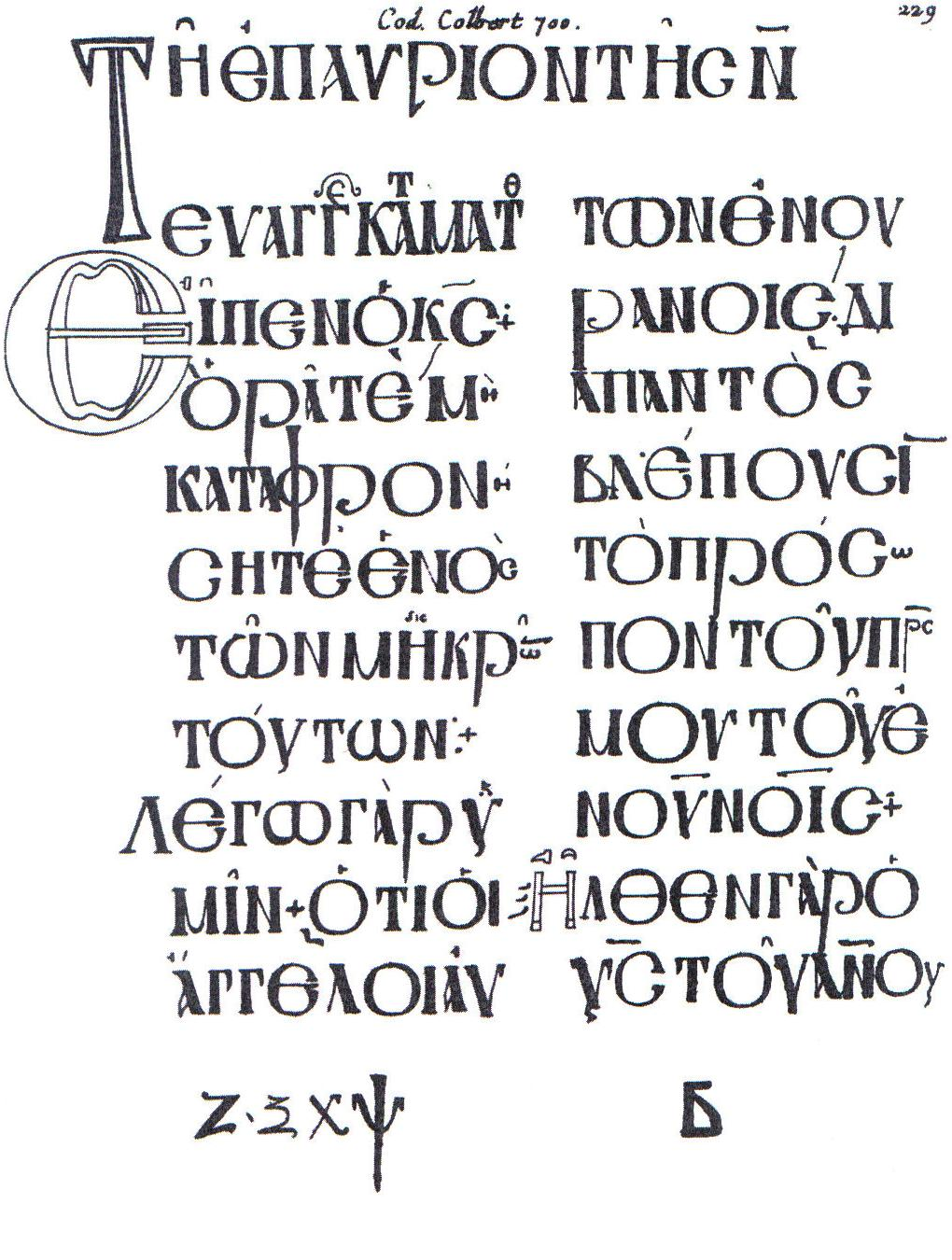
Example of Montfaucon's facsimile from Codex Colbertinus 700 (designated by ℓ 1 on the list Gregory-Åland), with text of Matthew 18:10

Montfaucon was born on 13 January 1655 in the Castle of Soulatgé, a small village in the Corbières Massif, then in the ancient province of Languedoc, now in the modern Department of Aude. Other sources claimed his birth date is in 16 January, the most accepted date. After one year he was moved to the Castle of Roquetaillade, residence of his family. When he was seven, he was sent to Limoux, to the college run by the Fathers of Christian Doctrine.

== Career ==
Montfaucon served in the French army as a volunteer and participated in the Franco-Dutch War of 1673. He was a captain of grenadiers and made two campaigns under the command of Marshall Turenne, participated in the Battle of Herbsthausen and fell ill in Saverne in Alsace. Because of his infectious illness he made a vow to Our Lady of Marceille to give one hundred livres to her sanctuary in Limoux and to become a monk, if he was able to return to his country as a result of her intervention.

After the death of Montfaucon's father at the Château de Roquetaillade, in 1675 he entered the novitiate of the Benedictine monastery of Bream in Toulouse. There he learned several ancient languages: Greek, Hebrew, Chaldean, Syriac, and Coptic.

In 1687 Montfaucon was called to the Abbey of Saint-Germain-des-Prés and he started to work on an edition of the works of the Greek Church Fathers.

In 1708 in Palaeographia Graeca Montfaucon became the first to use the term "palaeography". The work illustrates the entire history of Greek writing. It contains Montfaucon's discussions of variations in Greek letter forms, the use of abbreviations in Greek manuscripts, and the process of deciphering archaic writing. It was Montfaucon's special interest. In this work he often cited Greek manuscripts in texts of Athanasius of Alexandria, Origen, and John Chrysostom. The book dealt so comprehensively with the handwriting and other characteristics of Greek manuscripts that it remained the leading authority on the subject for almost two centuries. Subsequently, Montfaucon was commissioned to catalogue the Greek manuscripts of the Fonds Coislin, a large-scale project published as Bibliotheca Coisliniana (Paris, 1715).

Montfaucon published 15 volumes of L'antiquité expliquée et représentée en figures between 1719 and 1724. An English translation of this work was published in 1721–25 under the title Antiquity Explained and Represented in Sculptures. The work contained copperplate folio engravings of classical antiquities. It included a depiction of the "Barberini Vase", more commonly known as the "Portland Vase". This book is published in English under the title Antiquities. The materials used in this work were taken from the manuscripts deposited in French libraries. It contains many illustrative facsimiles, though they are engraved in a rather coarse way.

In 1719, Montfaucon was nominated by Philippe II, Duke of Orléans, to the Académie des Inscriptions et Belles-Lettres. In 1719, following the death of the Jesuit priest, Michel Le Tellier (1643–1719), confessor to the late King Louis XIV, Montfaucon became confessor to the young King Louis XV.

Montfaucon died on 21 December 1741 at the Abbey of Saint-Germain-des-Prés, where he was buried.

== Legacy ==
In a letter of 24 June 1786, Josiah Wedgwood explains that he had seen Montfaucon's engravings of the Portland Vase.

Montfaucon was the original editor of the homilies Adversus Judaeos by saint John Chrysostom along with many other works of the Fathers of the Church.

Montfaucon laid the foundation for the study of Greek manuscripts. Scrivener stated that his work still maintains a high authority, even "after more recent discoveries", especially of papyri in Egypt. Modern scholars agree that he effectively created a new discipline, palaeography, and brought it to an advanced state of sophistication.

Montfaucon was largely responsible for bringing the Bayeux Tapestry to public attention. In 1724, the scholar Antoine Lancelot discovered drawings of a section of the tapestry (about 30 feet of the Tapestry's 231 feet) among papers of Nicolas-Joseph Foucault, a Norman administrator. (These drawings of the tapestry's images "classicized" the somewhat crude Anglo-Norman originals by adding shadows and dimensionality to the figures.) Lancelot, unsure of what medium the drawings depicted, suggested that they might be a tomb relief, stained glass, a fresco, or even a tapestry. When Lancelot presented Foucault's drawings in 1724 to the Académie des Inscriptions et Belles-Lettres in Paris, they attracted the attention of Montfaucon, who subsequently tracked down the textile in the drawings with help from his Benedictine colleagues in Normandy. This is often regarded as the modern "discovery" of the Bayeux Tapestry, which had been displayed annually in Bayeux Cathedral, perhaps for centuries, without attracting outside attention. Montfaucon published the Foucault drawings in the first volume his Les Monumens de la Monarchie Françoise. In anticipation of volume 2 of Les Monumens, Montfaucon engaged the artist Antoine Benoit, and sent him to Bayeux to copy the Tapestry in its entirety and in a manner more faithful to its style. Emory University art history professor Elizabeth Carson Pastan criticizes Montfaucon for his "Norman Triumphalist" point of view in dealing with the story of the Tapestry, despite the fact that he asserted that one should trust "the best historians of Normandy". She does state, however, that modern scholars are indebted to him for his process of examining many accounts of the Norman Conquest in interpreting the Tapestry, and his highlighting of the Tapestry's ambiguity and enigma (such as why Harold Godwinson went to Normandy in 1064 and the identity of the elusive Aelfgyva).

== Works ==
- Analecta graeca, sive varia opuscula graeca hactenus non edita (Paris, 1688)
- S. Athanasii opera omnia (Paris, 1698)
- Diarium italicum (Paris, 1702)
- Bibliotheca Coisliniana (Paris, 1715)
- Collectio nova patrum graecorum (2 vols., 1706)
- Palaeographia Graeca, sive, De ortu et progressu literarum graecarum (Paris, 1708)
- Bibliotheca Coisliniana olim Segueriana, Paris: Ludovicus Guerin & Carolus Robustel, (Paris, 1715)
- L'antiquité expliquée et representée en figures/Antiquitas explanatione et schematibus illustrata (Bilingual edition, vols. 1–15, Paris, 1719–1724)
- Les monumens de la monarchie françoise (for Henrik IV, vols. 1–5, Paris, 1729–1733)
- Sancti patris nostri Ioannis Chrisostomi opera omnia (Paris, 1718–1738)
- Bibliotheca bibliothecarum manuscriptorum nova (vols. 1–2, Paris, 1739)

== See also ==
- Lectionary 295 – manuscript presented by Anselmo Banduri to Montfaucon
