= Lectionary 295 =

Lectionary ℓ 295
- New Testament manuscript
- Name: Banduri
- Text: Evangelistarium †
- Date: 10th century
- Script: Greek
- Now at: ?
- Size: ? cm by ? cm
- Type: Byzantine text-type

Lectionary 295 (Gregory-Aland), designated by siglum ℓ 295 (in the Gregory-Aland numbering) is a Greek manuscript of the New Testament, on parchment. Palaeographically it has been assigned to the 9th or 10th century.

== Description ==
The codex contains lesson from the Gospel of Luke 18:11-14 (Evangelistarium), on 1 parchment leaf.

The text is written in Greek uncial letters, in two columns per page, 18 lines per page. Size of the leaf is unknown.

== History ==
Gregory dated the manuscript to the 10th century. It has been assigned by the Institute for New Testament Textual Research to the 10th century.

Anselmo Banduri presented the manuscript to Bernard de Montfaucon. The manuscript was known to Johann Jakob Wettstein, Johann Jakob Griesbach and Johann Martin Augustin Scholz.

The manuscript was added to the list of New Testament manuscripts by Wettstein (suglum O^{e}). Gregory gave to it the number 295^{e}.

The manuscript is not cited in the critical editions of the Greek New Testament (UBS3).

The owner of the codex is unknown.

== See also ==
- List of New Testament lectionaries
- Biblical manuscript
- Textual criticism
- Lectionary 294

== Bibliography ==
- Gregory, Caspar René (1900). Textkritik des Neuen Testaments. Vol. 1. Leipzig: J.C. Hinrichs’sche Buchhandlung. p. 412.
