= Steven Freeman =

Steve or Steven Freeman may refer to:

- Steve Freeman (American football) (born 1953); American defensive back
- Steve Freeman (footballer); English midfielder during 1986–2003
- Steve Freeman (soccer) (born 1975); American midfielder during 1992–2003
- Steven Freeman, lead character in 1993's Jason Goes to Hell: The Final Friday

== See also ==
- Stephen Friedman (disambiguation)
