= Todd Hicks =

American soccer player and coach

Personal information
- Date of birth: November 3, 1974 (age 51)
- Place of birth: Bowie, Maryland, U.S.
- Height: 5 ft 10 in (1.78 m)
- Positions: Left back; midfielder

College career
Years	Team	Apps	(Gls)
1992–1995	Towson State Tigers		

Senior career*
Years	Team	Apps	(Gls)
1996–1998	Baltimore Spirit (indoor)	63	(6)
1996	Delaware Wizards	16	(6)
1997	Baltimore Bays	14	(5)
1998–1999	Delaware Wizards	31	(12)
1998–2001	Baltimore Blast (indoor)	50	(3)
2007	Crystal Palace Baltimore	1	(0)
- * Club domestic league appearances and goals

Todd Hicks (born November 3, 1974]) is an American former soccer left back who played in the National Professional Soccer League, USISL and USL Second Division. He coaches youth soccer. His is currently a High School Assistant Principal for Carroll County Public Schools and currently lives in Severna Park, Maryland.

Hicks attended Bowie High School where he played on the 1990 and 1991 State High School champion soccer team. He played several years for the Maryland ODP youth teams and the Region 1 regional team. In 1992, he entered Towson State University, playing on the men's soccer team until 1995. He played and started in every game while at Towson. He earned freshman of the year honors and was selected 1st team All-Big South his junior year and 1st team America East his senior year. He was the all-time leader in assist for a career (28), for a season (12), and in one game (4). In 2012, Hicks was inducted into the Towson University Hall of Fame.

In 1995, the Baltimore Spirit of the National Professional Soccer League selected Hicks in the NPSL Territorial Draft. He spent the six seasons with the team. In his first two seasons, the team used the Spirit name and in the next four they were known as the Baltimore Blast. In addition to his indoor career, Hicks played outdoor soccer. In 1996, 1998 and 1999, he spent the summers with the Delaware Wizards of the USISL. In 1997, he spent time playing in Germany and he played for the Baltimore Bays
