= USL Second Division =

Defunct American soccer league

- Founded: 1995
- Folded: 2010
- Replaced by: USL Pro
- Country: United States
- Confederation: US Soccer
- Number of clubs: 6–10
- Level on pyramid: 3
- Domestic cup: U.S. Open Cup
- Last champions: Charleston Battery
- Most championships: Charleston Battery; Charlotte Eagles; Long Island Rough Riders; Richmond Kickers; Utah Blitzz (2 titles each)

The USL Second Division (commonly referred to as USL-2) was a professional men's soccer league in the United States, operated by United Soccer Leagues (USL). It was at the third tier of soccer in the United States, behind Major League Soccer (top tier) and the USL First Division (second tier), and one step up from the USL Premier Development League and other leagues in the fourth tier.

== History ==
In 1995 the United States Interregional Soccer League (USISL), the de facto second tier of American soccer at the time, changed its name to the United States International Soccer League, and split into two leagues, one professional and one amateur. The professional league, initially called the USISL Pro League, was a FIFA-sanctioned Division 3 league, while the amateur league, (the 'Premier League'), was given Division 4 status and would later go on to become the USL Premier Development League. The first champions of the new USISL Pro League were the Long Island Rough Riders, who beat Minnesota Thunder 2–1 in the championship game.

In 1996, the USISL established a new USISL Select League. The strongest USISL Pro League teams joined this new league, which was given Division 2 status alongside the existing A-League, while the remainder of the teams (plus expansion teams) remained at Division 3 level. Charleston Battery became the league's second champions in this year, beating the Charlotte Eagles in a penalty shootout in the 1996 USISL Pro League championship game.

In 1997 the league changed its name to the USISL D-3 Pro League to further distinguish itself from the A-League, and then in 1999 the umbrella USISL changed its name to the United Soccer Leagues (USL), and as such the Pro League officially became known as the USL D3 Pro League. In 2003 the name was changed again to the USL Pro Select League, but during the season had to be changed to the USL Pro Soccer League for to legal reasons. In 2005 the league took its final name as the USL Second Division.

The USL Second Division dissolved following the 2010 season to make way for USL Pro, which combined the existing USL First and Second divisions and began play in 2011.

== Teams ==
Champions in Bold

- **Albuquerque Geckos** (1997)
- Arizona Sahuaros (1997–2002)
- Atlanta Magic (1995, only played 2 games)
- Austin Lone Stars (1997–2000)
- Bermuda Hogges (2007–09)
- Boston Storm (1995)
- Boston Bulldogs (2001)
- California Jaguars (1995–96, 1998–99, 1995 as Montego Bay Jaguars)
- California Gold (2002–04)
- Cape Cod Crusaders (1995, 1997–2000)
- Carolina Dynamo (1995, 1999–2003, 1995 as Greensboro Dynamo)
- Cascade Surge (1995–96, as Oregon Surge in 1995)
- Central California Valley Hydra (1995–96)
- Central Jersey Riptide (1996–98)
- **Charleston Battery** (1995–96, 2010)
- **Charlotte Eagles** (1995–2000, 2004–10)
- Chattanooga Express (1995–96)
- **Chicago Stingers** (1995–98,)
- Chico Rooks (1995–2001)
- Cincinnati Cheetahs (1995)
- Cincinnati Kings (2005–07)
- Cleveland Caps (1997–98)
- **Cleveland City Stars** (2007–08)
- Columbus Xoggz (1995)
- Connecticut Wolves (1995, 2002)
- Crystal Palace Baltimore (2007–09)
- Delaware Wizards (1995, 1997–2000)
- Detroit Wheels (1995)
- Eastern Shore Sharks (1995–99, as Baltimore Bays in 1995–97)
- El Paso Patriots (1995)
- Everett BigFoot (1995–96)
- Florida Stars (1995)
- Florida Strikers (1995, 1997, as Fort Lauderdale Strikers in 1995)
- Fresno Dragons (1999)
- Greenville Lions (2001–02)
- Hampton Roads Mariners (1995)
- **Harrisburg City Islanders** (2004–10)
- Hawaii Tsunami (1995–1997)
- Houston Force (1995)
- Houston Hurricanes (1996–2000)
- Indiana Blast (1997–98)
- Jersey Dragons (1995)
- Las Vegas Quicksilver (1995)
- Lexington Bluegrass Bandits (1995)
- **Long Island Rough Riders** (1995, 2002–06)
- Los Angeles Salsa U-23s (1995)
- Louisville Thoroughbreds (1995)
- Miami Breakers (1998)
- Milwaukee Rampage (1995)
- Minnesota Thunder (1995)
- Mobile Revelers (1995–1997)
- Myrtle Beach Boyz (1995)
- Myrtle Beach Seadawgs (1997–99)
- New Hampshire Ramblers (1995)
- New Hampshire Phantoms (1996–2007)
- New Jersey Stallions (1997–2003, as New York/New Jersey Stallions in 1997–98)
- New Mexico Chiles (1995)
- New Orleans Riverboat Gamblers (1995)
- New York Capital District Alleycats (1995–98, as Albany Alleycats in 1995–96)
- New York Fever (1995)
- New York Freedom (2002–03)
- North Jersey Imperials (1996–97, 1999)
- Northern Nevada Aces (2001–02)
- Northern Virginia Royals (1998–2005)
- Orlando Nighthawks (1997–98, as Daytona Tigers in 1997)
- Philadelphia Freedom (1995–97, as Pennsylvania Freedom in 1995)
- Pensacola Barracudas (1998)
- Portland Firebirds (1995)
- Raleigh Flyers (1995)
- Reading Rage (1996–2003)
- Reno Rattlers (1995, 1997–98)
- Rhode Island Stingrays (1995–2001)
- **Richmond Kickers** (2006–10)
- Pittsburgh Riverhounds (2004–06, 2008–10, as Riverhounds FC in 2004)
- Riverside County Elite (2000)
- Roanoke Wrath (1998–2000)
- Rockford Raptors (1995–98)
- Sacramento Scorpions (1997)
- St. Louis Knights (1995)
- San Antonio Pumas (1995–98)
- San Diego Top Guns (1995)
- San Diego Gauchos (2002–04)
- San Fernando Valley Golden Eagles (1995–98)
- San Francisco Bay Diablos (1995)
- San Francisco Bay Seals (1997)
- Shreveport/Bossier Lions (1998)
- South Carolina Shamrocks (1997–99)
- South Jersey Barons (1997-02)
- Southwest Florida Manatees (1998)
- Stanislaus County Cruisers (1997–2001)
- Tallahassee Tempest (1998)
- Tampa Bay Cyclones (1995)
- Texas Lightning (1995)
- Texas Rattlers (1995–2000, as Dallas/Ft. Worth Toros in 1995–96, as Dallas Toros in 1997, as Texas Toros in 1998–99)
- Tucson Fireballs (1997–2001, as Los Angeles Fireballs in 1997–99)
- Tulsa Roughnecks (1995–99)
- **Utah Blitzz** (2000–04)
- Vermont Voltage (1997–98, as Vermont Wanderers in 1997)
- Washington Mustangs (1996)
- Westchester Flames (2002–04)
- **Western Mass Pioneers** (1998–2009)
- **Wilmington Hammerheads** (1996–2009)
- Worcester Wildfire (1996)
- Yakima Reds (1995–96)

=== Timeline ===
Active in USL 2nd Division Club moved to USL First Division Club moved to USL PDL Club moved to USL Pro USSF D2 Season (2010) Club on hiatus

== Past champions ==
Season	Champion	Score	Runner-up
USISL Pro League
1995	Long Island Rough Riders	2–1	Minnesota Thunder
1996	Charleston Battery	3–2 (SO)	Charlotte Eagles
USISL D-3 Pro League
1997	Albuquerque Geckos	4–1	Charlotte Eagles
1998	Chicago Stingers	3–2 (OT)	New Hampshire Phantoms
USL D3 Pro League
1999	Western Mass Pioneers	2–1	South Jersey Barons
2000	Charlotte Eagles	5–0	New Jersey Stallions
2001	Utah Blitzz	1–0	Greenville Lions
2002	Long Island Rough Riders	2–1	Wilmington Hammerheads
USL Pro Select League (USL Pro Soccer League)
2003	Wilmington Hammerheads	2–1 (2OT)	Westchester Flames
2004	Utah Blitzz	2–2 (5–4 p)	Charlotte Eagles
USL Second Division
2005	Charlotte Eagles	2–2 (5–4 p)	Western Mass Pioneers
2006	Richmond Kickers	2–1	Charlotte Eagles
2007	Harrisburg City Islanders	1–1 (8–7 p)	Richmond Kickers
2008	Cleveland City Stars	2–1	Charlotte Eagles
2009	Richmond Kickers	3–1	Charlotte Eagles
2010	Charleston Battery	2–1	Richmond Kickers

=== Championships by team ===
Club	Winner	Seasons won
Long Island Rough Riders	2	1995, 2002
Charleston Battery	2	1996, 2010
Charlotte Eagles	2	2000, 2005
Utah Blitzz	2	2001, 2004
Richmond Kickers	2	2006, 2009
Albuquerque Geckos	1	1997
Chicago Stingers	1	1998
Western Mass Pioneers	1	1999
Wilmington Hammerheads	1	2003
Harrisburg City Islanders	1	2007
Cleveland City Stars	1	2008
