= Pensacola Barracudas =

Pensacola Barracudas may refer to:

- Pensacola Barracudas (arena football), American football team
- Pensacola Barracudas (soccer), soccer team
