= Marcus Haynes =

American football player (born 1998)

Profile
- Position: Defensive lineman

Personal information
- Born: April 7, 1998 (age 28); Bowie, Maryland, U.S.
- Listed height: 6 ft 4 in (1.93 m)
- Listed weight: 240 lb (109 kg)

Career information
- High school: Fork Union Military Academy (Fork Union, Virginia)
- College: Old Dominion (2017–2022)
- NFL draft: 2023: undrafted

Career history
- Denver Broncos (2023)*; Houston Texans (2024)*; Cleveland Browns (2024)*; Pittsburgh Steelers (2024)*; Cleveland Browns (2024)*; San Antonio Brahmas (2025); Indianapolis Colts (2025)*; Saskatchewan Roughriders (2026)*
- * Offseason or practice squad member only
- Stats at Pro Football Reference

Marcus Haynes (born April 7, 1998) is an American professional football defensive lineman. He played college football for the Old Dominion Monarchs. He is the older brother of offensive guard Christian Haynes.

== Early life ==
Haynes grew up in Bowie, Maryland, and attended Bowie High School where he played football, basketball and track & field. He later transferred to Fork Union Military Academy. He was rated a three-star recruit and committed to play college football at Old Dominion over offers from schools such as Cincinnati and Colorado State.

== College career ==
Haynes redshirted during his true freshman season in 2017. During the 2018 season, he played in all 12 games at defensive line and finished the season with seven solo stops, 2.0 tackles for loss for seven yards and 2.0 sacks for seven yards. During the 2019 season, he appeared in all 12 games and started three of them at defensive end. He finished the season with 21 total tackles (14 solo stops and seven assisted), 6.5 tackles for loss for 27 yards, 3.5 sacks for 23 yards, two forced fumbles and one fumble recovery. Old Dominion's 2020 season was cancelled due to the COVID-19 pandemic. During the 2021 season he played in all 13 games and started six of them at defensive end. He finished the season with 27 total tackles (13 solo stops and 14 assisted), six tackles for loss for 40 yards, 5.5 sacks for 39 yards and a forced fumble. During the 2022 season, he played in and started all 12 games at defensive end and finished the season with 47 total tackles (21 solo stops and 26 assisted), 7.5 tackles for loss for 39 yards, four sacks for 31 yards and a forced fumble.

== Professional career ==
Pre-draft measurables
Height	Weight	Arm length	Hand span	40-yard dash	10-yard split	20-yard split	20-yard shuttle	Three-cone drill	Vertical jump	Broad jump	Bench press
6 ft 4 3/8 in (1.94 m)	233 lb (106 kg)	33 1/2 in (0.85 m)	10 3/8 in (0.26 m)	4.83 s	1.64 s	2.75 s	4.51 s	7.09 s	34.5 in (0.88 m)	9 ft 11 in (3.02 m)	20 reps
All values from Pro Day

=== Denver Broncos ===
Haynes was signed by the Denver Broncos as an undrafted free agent on May 5, 2023. He was waived on August 29, 2023 but was signed to the practice squad the next day. He was released on November 27.

=== Houston Texans ===
On February 16, 2024, Haynes was signed by the Houston Texans to a reserve/futures contract. He was waived on May 28.

=== Cleveland Browns (first stint) ===
Haynes signed with the Cleveland Browns on August 6, 2024. He was waived six days later.

=== Pittsburgh Steelers ===
On August 20, 2024, Haynes signed with the Pittsburgh Steelers. He was waived on August 27, and re-signed to the practice squad. He was released on September 10, 2024. On September 24, 2024, he re-signed to the Steelers practice squad, and released a week later.

=== Cleveland Browns (second stint) ===
On October 9, 2024, Haynes was signed to the Cleveland Browns' practice squad. He signed a reserve/future contract with Cleveland on January 6, 2025. On May 12, Haynes was waived by the Browns.

=== San Antonio Brahmas ===
Haynes signed with the San Antonio Brahmas of the UFL on August 2, 2024. His contract was terminated on August 6, 2024. He was re-signed on May 20, 2025.

=== Indianapolis Colts ===
Haynes was signed by the Indianapolis Colts on August 13, 2025. He was waived on August 26 as part of final roster cuts.

=== Saskatchewan Roughriders ===
Haynes signed with the Saskatchewan Roughriders in the Canadian Football League on January 22, 2026. He was released on May 26.
