= Southwest Florida Manatees =

- Dissolved: 1998

The Southwest Florida Manatees were an American soccer team that played in Cape Coral, Florida.

In the 1997 season they played in the United States Interregional Soccer League Premier Development Soccer League. In the 1998 season, they played in the USISL D-3 Pro League. The roster included a diverse group of players ranging from international players and local talent. A portion of their roster included local college standout players such as: Randy Irick (Fwd), Neal Wolfrath (Def), Ryan Hyypio (Def), and Jaymi Bailey (Mid).

In 1998, the Southwest Florida Manatees were an affiliate for the Tampa Bay Mutiny of Major League Soccer.

The team folded after the 1998 USISL D-3 Pro League season.

== Year-by-year ==
Year	Division	League	Reg. season	Game Played	W	L	PKW	PKL	GF	GA	GD	Pts	Playoffs	Open Cup
1997	"4"	USISL PDSL	5th, Southeast	16	0	16	0	0	9	74	-65	0	Did not qualify	Did not qualify
1998	3	USISL D-3 Pro League	3rd, Southeast	18	8	10	0	1	34	57	-23	24	Lost Division Semifinals (Orlando Nighthawks 6–2)	Did not qualify

Source: RSSSF
