= Lectionary 294 =

Lectionary ℓ 294
- New Testament manuscript
- Name: Tubingiensis
- Text: Evangelistarium †
- Date: 9th/10th century
- Script: Greek
- Now at: University of Tübingen
- Size: 31 cm by 25 cm
- Type: Byzantine text-type

Lectionary 294 (Gregory-Aland), designated by siglum ℓ 294 (in the Gregory-Aland numbering) is a Greek manuscript of the New Testament, on parchment. Palaeographically It has been assigned to the 9th or 10th century.

== Description ==
The codex contains lesson from the Gospel of John 1:38-50 (Evangelistarium), on 1 parchment leaf (31 cm by 25 cm),

The text is written in Greek uncial letters, in two columns per page, 19 lines per page.

== History ==
Gregory dated the manuscript to the 11th century. It has been assigned by the Institute for New Testament Textual Research (INTF) to the 9th or 10th century.

The manuscript was examined by Johann Jakob Griesbach and Scholz.

The manuscript was added to the list of New Testament manuscripts by Johann Jakob Wettstein (number 98^{e}). Gregory catalogued it as number 294^{e}. Gregory saw the manuscript in 1891.

The manuscript is not cited in the critical editions of the Greek New Testament (UBS3).

The codex is housed at the University of Tübingen (Mb. 4), in Tübingen.

== See also ==
- List of New Testament lectionaries
- Biblical manuscript
- Textual criticism
- Lectionary 293

== Bibliography ==
- Gregory, Caspar René (1900). Textkritik des Neuen Testaments. Vol. 1. Leipzig: J.C. Hinrichs’sche Buchhandlung. p. 412.
