= Christian Haynes =

American football player (born 2000)

No. 64 – Miami Dolphins
- Position: Guard
- Roster status: Active

Personal information
- Born: April 13, 2000 (age 26); Bowie, Maryland, U.S.
- Listed height: 6 ft 3 in (1.91 m)
- Listed weight: 317 lb (144 kg)

Career information
- High school: Bowie (MD)
- College: UConn (2018–2023)
- NFL draft: 2024: 3rd round, 81st overall pick

Career history
- Seattle Seahawks (2024–2026); Miami Dolphins (2026–present)

Awards and highlights
- Super Bowl champion (LX)

Career NFL statistics as of Week 1, 2026
- Games played: 25
- Stats at Pro Football Reference

Christian Haynes (born April 13, 2000) is an American professional football guard for the Miami Dolphins of the National Football League (NFL). He played college football for the UConn Huskies and was selected by the Seattle Seahawks in the third round of the 2024 NFL draft.

== Early life ==
Haynes was born on April 13, 2000, in Bowie, Maryland, later attending Bowie High School.

== College career ==
Haynes played at the University of Connecticut from 2018 to 2023. After playing in two games and redshirting his first year in 2018, Haynes started 49 consecutive games over the next five seasons for UConn. He was named an All-American in 2022 and 2023.

== Professional career ==
Pre-draft measurables
Height	Weight	Arm length	Hand span	Wingspan	40-yard dash	10-yard split	20-yard split	Vertical jump	Broad jump	Bench press
6 ft 2 3/4 in (1.90 m)	317 lb (144 kg)	33 1/2 in (0.85 m)	9 in (0.23 m)	6 ft 7 3/4 in (2.03 m)	5.03 s	1.75 s	2.91 s	33.0 in (0.84 m)	8 ft 6 in (2.59 m)	25 reps
All values from NFL Combine

=== Seattle Seahawks ===
Haynes was selected by the Seattle Seahawks in the third round (81st overall pick) in the 2024 NFL draft. He appeared in 16 contests for Seattle during his rookie campaign, with no starts.

Haynes began the 2025 season on injured reserve, causing him to miss the team's first nine games. He was activated on November 15, 2025, ahead of the team's Week 11 matchup against the Los Angeles Rams.

On October 27, 2026, Haynes was waived after the Seahawks acquired guard Quenton Nelson in a trade.

=== Miami Dolphins ===
On October 28, 2026, Haynes was claimed off waivers by the Miami Dolphins.

== Personal life ==
He is the younger brother of NFL outside linebacker Marcus Haynes.
