= Steve Freeman (footballer) =

English footballer

Personal information
- Place of birth: Richmond, England
- Position: Midfielder

College career
Years	Team	Apps	(Gls)
1986–1989	Florida Tech Panthers		

Senior career*
Years	Team	Apps	(Gls)
1992–1993	Orlando Lions		
1994	Cocoa Expos		
1994	Orlando Lions		
1995–1996	Cocoa Expos		
1997	Orlando Sundogs	24	(1)
1999	Orlando Nighthawks	21	(1)
2000–2002	Cocoa Expos		
2003	Central Florida Kraze		
2003	Cocoa Expos	3	(2)
- * Club domestic league appearances and goals

Steve Freeman is an English retired association football midfielder who played professionally in the USISL A-League.

== Youth ==
A native of England, Freeman came to the United States to attend Florida Institute of Technology. He also played for the FIT soccer team from 1986 to 1989. In 1988, FIT won the NCAA Division II Men's Soccer Championship and Freeman was selected as a First Team All American. He repeated as First Team All American in 1989. In 1995, he was inducted into the FIT Hall of Fame.

== Professional ==
In 1992, Freeman turned professional with the Orlando Lions of the USISL. In 1994, Freeman left the Lions to sign with the Cocoa Expos, but in June, he left the Expos to return to the Lions. In 1995 and 1996, Freeman began and ended each season with the Expos as they played in the USISL Premier League. In 1997, he played for the Orlando Sundogs in their single year of existence in the USISL A-League. In 1998, he moved to the Orlando Nighthawks in the USISL D-3 Pro League. In 2000, Freeman returned to the Cocoa Expos. In 2003, he began the season with the Central Florida Kraze, but played three games for the Expos as well. He works for Morgan Stanley in Orlando, Florida.
