= Conilhac-de-la-Montagne =

Part of Roquetaillade-et-Conilhac in Occitanie, France

- Part of Roquetaillade-et-Conilhac
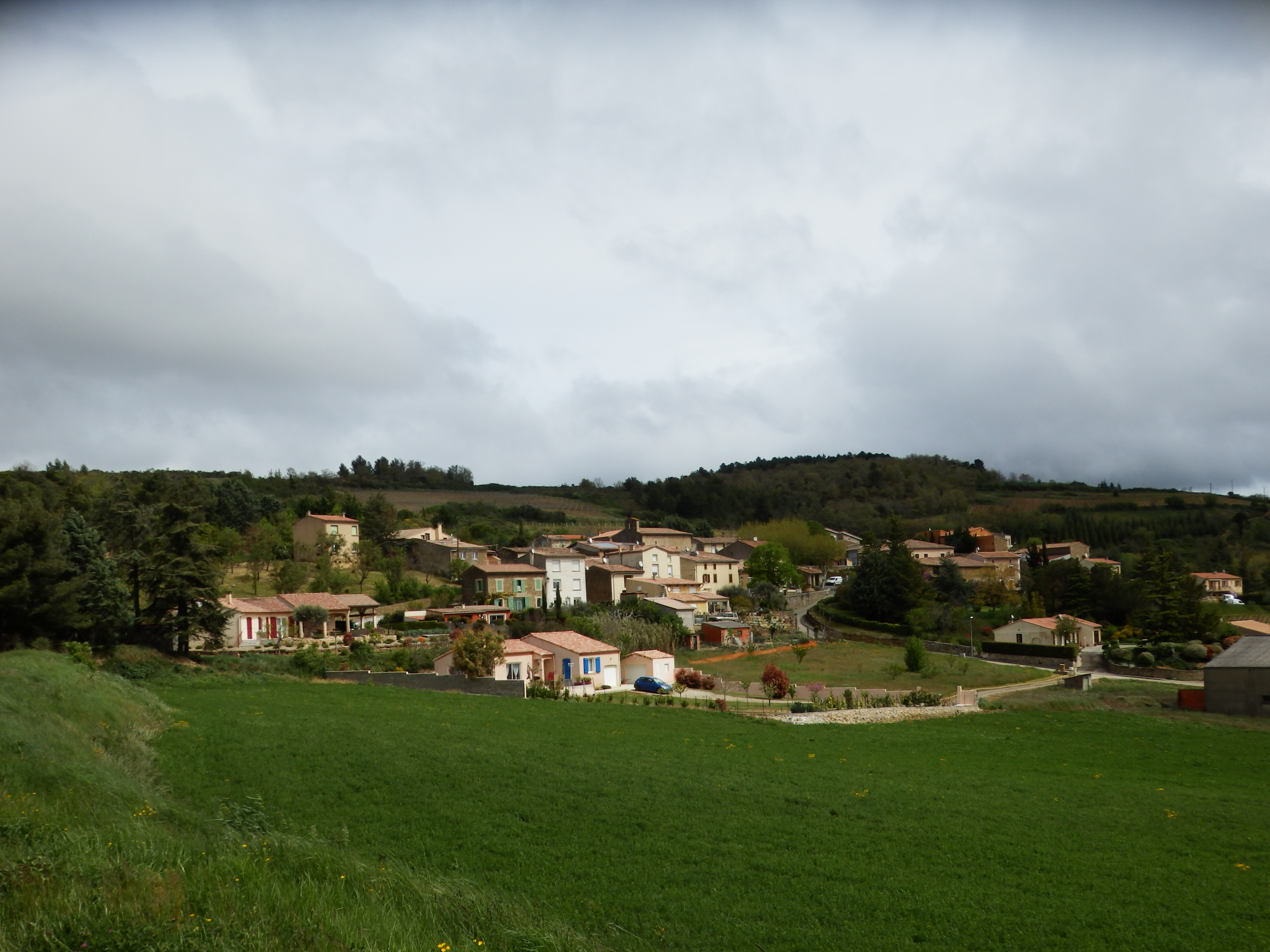
- A view of Conilhac-de-la-Montagne

- Coat of arms
- Location of Conilhac-de-la-Montagne
- Location within France Location within Occitanie
- Coordinates: 42°58′46″N 2°11′41″E
- Country: France
- Region: Occitania
- Department: Aude
- Arrondissement: Limoux
- Canton: La Haute-Vallée de l'Aude
- Commune: Roquetaillade-et-Conilhac
- Area^{1}: 4.45 km^{2} (1.72 sq mi)
- Elevation: 425 m (1,394 ft)
- Highest elevation: 602 m (1,975 ft)
- Lowest elevation: 380 m (1,250 ft)
- Population (2023): 66
  - Density: 15/km^{2} (38/sq mi)
- Time zone: UTC+01:00 (CET)
  - Summer (DST): UTC+02:00 (CEST)
- Postal code: 11190
- ^{1} French Land Register data, which excludes lakes, ponds, glaciers > 1 km^{2} (0.386 sq mi or 247 acres) and river estuaries.

Conilhac-de-la-Montagne (French pronunciation: [kɔnijak də la mɔ̃taɲ]; Languedocien: Conilhac de la Montanha) is a former commune in the Aude department in southern France. On 1 January 2019, it was merged into the new commune Roquetaillade-et-Conilhac.

== See also ==
- Communes of the Aude department
