= Lectionary 1 =

Lectionary ℓ 1
- New Testament manuscript
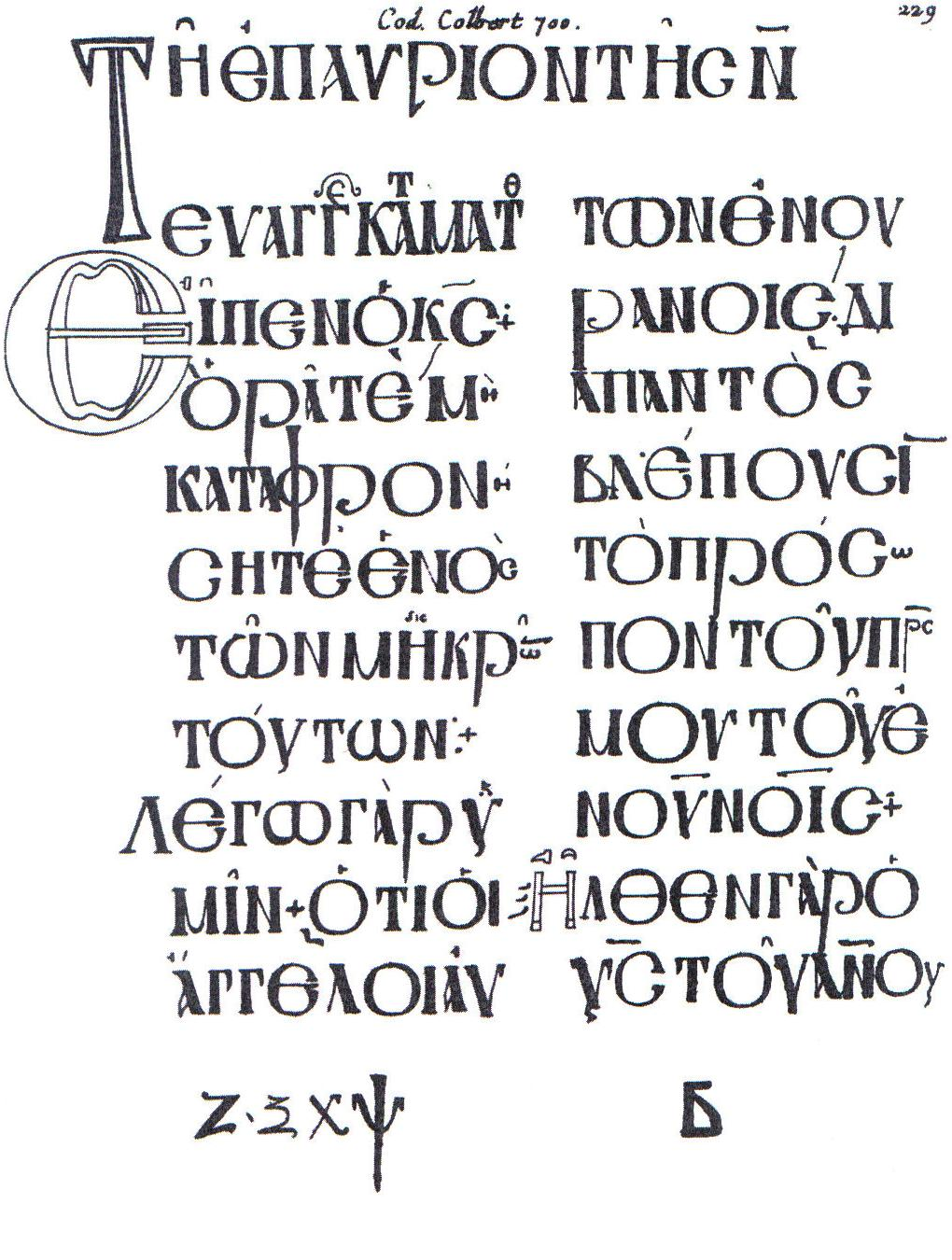
- Matthew 18:10
- Text: Evangelistarion
- Date: 10th century
- Script: Greek
- Now at: Bibliothèque nationale de France
- Size: 30 cm by 24 cm

Lectionary 1, designated siglum ℓ 1 (in the Gregory-Aland numbering), is a Greek manuscript of the New Testament on vellum. Palaeographically it has been assigned to the 10th century. Formerly it was known as Codex Colbertinus 700, then Codex Regius 278.

== Description ==
The codex contains lessons from the Gospels lectionary (Evangelistarium) with some lacunae. The text is written in Greek uncial letters, on 265 parchment leaves (30 cm by 24 cm), 2 columns per page, 10 lines per page, 7–9 letters per line.

Lessons from the codex were read from Pascha to Pentecost.

== History ==
Formerly it was variously dated. Scrivener dated to the 8th century, Henri Omont to the 14th century, Gregory to the 10th century. In the present day it is unanimously dated to the 10th century.

The manuscript once belonged to Colbert. It was examined and described by Bernard de Montfaucon, Wettstein, Scholz, Paulin Martin, and Henri Omont. C. R. Gregory saw the manuscript in 1885.

It was added to the list of the New Testament manuscripts by Wettstein.

The manuscript is sporadically cited in the critical editions of the Greek New Testament of UBS (UBS3). It is not cited in UBS4.

The codex now is located in the Bibliothèque nationale de France (Gr. 278).

== See also ==
- List of New Testament lectionaries
- Biblical manuscript
- Textual criticism

== Bibliography ==
- Henri Omont, Fac-similés des plus anciens mss. grecs de la Bibliothèque Nationale du IVe and XIVe siècle (Paris, 1892), 21.
