= Manny Oudin =

Personal information
- Full name: Emmanuel Oudin
- Date of birth: March 20, 1968 (age 58)
- Place of birth: France
- Height: 5 ft 9 in (1.75 m)
- Position: Defender

College career
Years	Team	Apps	(Gls)
1986–1988	East Stroudsburg University		

Senior career*
Years	Team	Apps	(Gls)
1992–1994	Cleveland Crunch (indoor)	9	(0)
1993	Delaware Wizards		
1994–1996	Harrisburg Heat (indoor)	72	(9)
1996	Delaware Wizards		
1997–1998	Hershey Wildcats	54	(0)
1998–1999	Philadelphia KiXX (indoor)	8	(0)
1999	Lehigh Valley Steam		
2001	Hershey Wildcats	1	(1)
2001–2003	Reading Rage	16	(0)

Managerial career
- 1989–1992: East Stroudsburg University men (assistant)
- 1992–1993: East Stroudsburg University women (assistant)
- 1997–2002: Moravian Academy
- 1999: Lehigh Valley Steam (assistant)
- 2001–2003: Reading Rage (assistant)
- 2003–2009: Lehigh University
- * Club domestic league appearances and goals

Emmanuel "Manny" Oudin (born March 20, 1968, in France) is the former head soccer coach of the Lehigh University women's soccer team. Oudin finished his career at Lehigh after eight seasons ending in 2009. He previously had an extensive playing and coaching career both at the collegiate and professional levels. He played as a defender both indoors and out, winning the 1995 National Professional Soccer League with the Cleveland Crunch. He also coached at the high school, college and professional levels before becoming head coach at Lehigh University.

== Youth ==
Oudin graduated from Lenape Valley High School in Stanhope, New Jersey, and attended East Stroudsburg University, playing on the men's soccer team from 1985 to 1988. He graduated with a bachelor's degree in physical education in 1991. In 1993, he signed with the Cleveland Crunch of the National Professional Soccer League (NPSL). That season the Crunch won the NPSL title. In 1994, he moved to the Harrisburg Heat, remaining with the team through the 1995–1996 season. At some point, probably in 1996, Oudin played for the Delaware Wizards of USISL. In 1997, he signed with the Hershey Wildcats. This brought him back to eastern Pennsylvania, an area he had lived in during college and an area he would make home for the rest of his career. Oudin played the 1997 and 1998 seasons with the Wildcats. In the fall of 1998, he signed with the local Philadelphia KiXX of the NPSL. In 1999, he returned to the USISL, this time with the Lehigh Valley Steam where he was both a player and assistant coach. The Steam folded at the end of the season and Oudin moved to the Reading Rage of the USL Pro Select League, playing with the Rage until 2003 when he retired from playing professionally.

== Coach ==
Oudin began his coaching career as an assistant with the East Stroudsburg University men's team from 1989 to 1992. In 1992, he also became an assistant with the women's soccer team, a position he held through 1993. In 1997, he became the head coach of both the boy's and girl's teams at the Moravian Academy, a private primary/secondary school in Bethlehem, Pennsylvania. In 1999, Oudin served as an assistant coach, as well as player, for the Lehigh Valley Steam. He then served as an assistant coach with the Reading Rage from 2001 to 2003. On September 21, 2003, Lehigh University announced the hiring of Oudin as the head coach of its women's soccer team. Manny finished his career at Lehigh University after the 2009–2010 season.
