= Stephen Friedman =

Stephen Friedman may refer to:

- Stephen J. Friedman (academic administrator) (born 1938), former commissioner of the United States Securities and Exchange Commission, and president of Pace University
- Stephen Friedman (economist) (born 1937), former chairman of the United States President's Foreign Intelligence Advisory Board
- Stephen J. Friedman (producer) (1937–1996), American film producer

== See also ==
- Steven Freeman (disambiguation)
- Steven Friedman (born 1953), South African academic and newspaper columnist
- Friedman
