= Roquetaillade-et-Conilhac =

Commune in Occitanie, France

- Commune
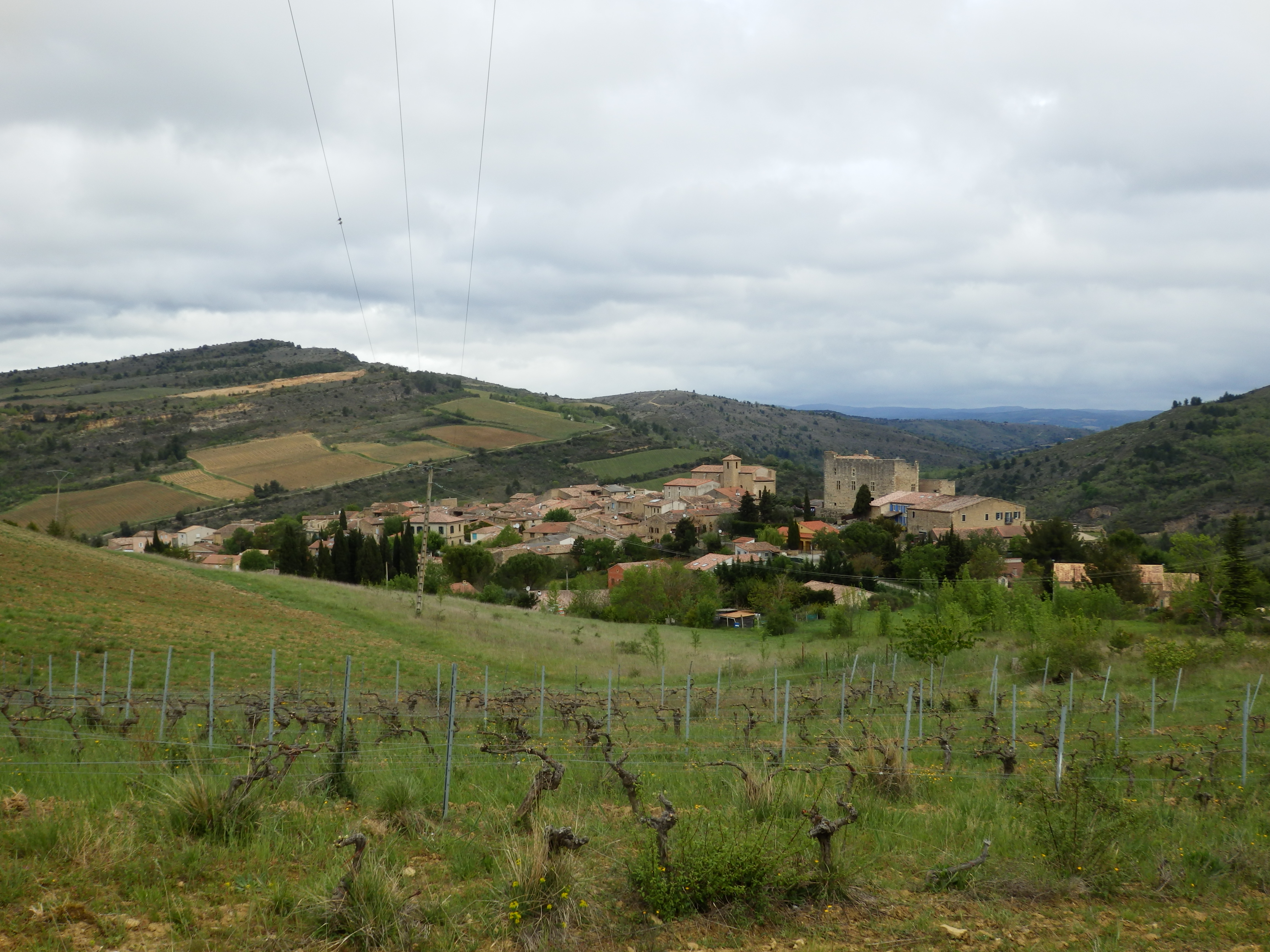
- A general view of Roquetaillade
- Location of Roquetaillade-et-Conilhac
- Location within France Location within Occitanie
- Coordinates: 42°59′40″N 2°11′59″E
- Country: France
- Region: Occitania
- Department: Aude
- Arrondissement: Limoux
- Canton: La Haute-Vallée de l'Aude
- Intercommunality: Limouxin

Government
  - Mayor (2020–2026): Dominique Azam
- Area^{1}: 15.80 km^{2} (6.10 sq mi)
- Highest elevation: 654 m (2,146 ft)
- Lowest elevation: 240 m (790 ft)
- Population (2023): 265
  - Density: 16.8/km^{2} (43.4/sq mi)
- Time zone: UTC+01:00 (CET)
  - Summer (DST): UTC+02:00 (CEST)
- INSEE/Postal code: 11323 /11300
- ^{1} French Land Register data, which excludes lakes, ponds, glaciers > 1 km^{2} (0.386 sq mi or 247 acres) and river estuaries.

Roquetaillade-et-Conilhac (French pronunciation: [ʁɔktajad e kɔnijak]) is a commune in the Aude department in southern France. The municipality was established on 1 January 2019 by merger of the former communes of Roquetaillade and Conilhac-de-la-Montagne.

== See also ==
- Communes of the Aude department
