= Casimir Oudin =

French monk, librarian, and bibliographer

- Born: 11 February 1638; Charleville-Mézières
- Died: September 1717 (aged 78–79)
- Occupation: Librarian

Remi-Casimir Oudin (14 February 1638 – September 1717) was a French Premonstratensian monk and bibliographer, who later in life was a Protestant convert, and a librarian in Leyden. He engaged in controversy with Anselmo Banduri. His major work was Commentarius de scriptoribus ecclesiae antiquis.

== Life ==
Oudin was born at Mezieres-sur-Meuse on 14 February 1638. He was the son of a weaver. After studying at Charleville, he joined the Premonstrants in 1655, chiefly with a view to devoting himself entirely to study. The history of ecclesiastical writers first attracted his attention. In 1669 he was appointed professor of theology in the abbey of Moreau, and the next year grand-prior. Finally, after taking charge for a while of the Church of Epinay-sous-Gamaches, in the diocese of Rouen, he retired into a convent in 1677 to resume his former scientific labors. After visiting the divers establishments of the order in Lorraine, Burgundy, and the Netherlands, he obtained permission to settle at Paris in 1683, and soon became intimate with the learned Benedictines of St. Maur, who placed their rich historical materials at his disposal, in order that he might write for them a history of their order — a task which, however, he never attempted. He enjoyed great reputation for learning, and was even considered a model of piety and regularity.

But his superiors, frightened at an intimacy which sprung up between him and the renowned Jurieu, confined him to the abbey of Ressons near Beauvais, in 1692. The severe penances to which he was subjected contributed also to disgust him with monastic life; and having finally succeeded in escaping to Holland in 1692; he made an open profession of Protestantism at Leyden. He was subsequently appointed under-librarian of the university of that place, and died there in September 1717.

The Abbé Boulliot (Jean-Baptiste-Joseph Boulliot), in his Biogr. Ardennaise (vol. ii), says of Oudin: "Contrary to what usually happens to such deserters, he always preserved the general esteem of his co-religionists. This was owing mainly to the purity of his life. To those who advised him to marry, he answered that he had become a Calvinist for the sake of truth, and not to free himself from celibacy." Oudin's principal works are: — Supplementunm de scriptoribus vel de scriptis ecclesiasticis a Bellarmino omissis ad annum 1460 (Paris, 1686, 8vo). This work which is far from supplying all the authors omitted by Bellarmine, contains, according to Cave, a large number of errors: — Le Premontré défroqué (Leyden, 1692, 12mo): — Veterum aliquot Galliae et Belgii scriptorum opuscula sacra numquam edita (ibid. 1692, .8vo): — Historia abbatis Caivi-Montis, in Acta Sanctorum, vol. iii (1701): — De Collectanea, in Mason, Hist. de la republique des Lettres, vol. ii, viii: — Trias dissertationum criticarum (Leyden, 1717, 8vo). In this work he claims that the Codex Alexandrinus dates only from the 10th century, and that the questions Ad Antiochum principem were attributed by mistake to St. Athanasius; — De scriptoribus Ecclesiae antiquis (Leips. 1722, 3 vols. fol.). See Niceron, Memoires, vol. i, x; Moreri, Dict. hist.; Paquot, Melmoires; Hugo, Annales ord. Prcem. 1:55; Haag, La France Protestante.
