= Bowie High School (Maryland) =

Location
- 15200 Annapolis Road; Bowie, Maryland; United States; 38.977388°N 76.742916°W

Information
- Type: Public High School
- Established: 1965
- School district: Prince George's County Public Schools
- Principal: Joseph Kautzer
- Grades: 9–12
- Enrollment: 2,573
- Colors: Navy Blue, Burgundy and White
- Mascot: Spike the Bulldog
- Yearbook: Bulldog
- Website: pgcps.org/schools/bowie-high

Bowie High School is a public high school in Bowie, Maryland, United States and a part of Prince George's County Public Schools.

It serves Bowie, Queen Anne CDP, and portions of the Brock Hall, Fairwood, Glenn Dale, and Woodmore CDPs. It serves sections of the former Greater Upper Marlboro CDP.

== History ==
Bowie High School was built in 1965 in Bowie, Maryland.

In 2005, PGCPS placed the 9th graders in the Belair annex in Bowie as the main school building was becoming overcrowded. The main building remained overcrowded in 2018, as even after the move, the number of temporary buildings was to go down from 16 to 12.

== Academics ==
In 2007 Bowie High was among the top 5 percent of U.S. high schools for AP participation. It also had a honors program for highly motivated students named the SUMMIT program, where 60 students take college level honor and AP courses to prepare them for college and career.

== Notable alumni ==
- Alessandro Battilocchio, socialist politician
- Michael Beasley, NBA basketball player
- Scott Buete, soccer player
- Eva Cassidy, singer and musician
- JC Chasez, singer-songwriter
- Brian Ellerbe, basketball coach
- Kathie Lee Gifford, entertainer
- Christian Haynes, football player
- A. J. Hendy, football player
- Todd Hicks, pro soccer player
- Erik Imler, soccer player
- Mark Jonas, soccer player
- John Kaleo, football player
- Abby Phillip, journalist
- Brad Schumacher, swimmer and water polo player
- Paul Reed Smith, namesake of PRS Guitars
- Chris Volz, Singer/songwriter

== Drinking and drunk driving ==
In the 1980s, Bowie High School had a high rate of drinking and gained national attention. In 1986, the school initiated programs to curb drunk driving after 15 students were killed in 1979 and 1980. In 1986, another three were killed in a drunk driving crash on the Capital Beltway.

== See also ==
- List of high schools in Maryland
