= Codex Tischendorfianus V =

Lectionary ℓ 293
- New Testament manuscript
- Name: Tischendorfianus V
- Text: Evangelistarium †
- Date: 8th century
- Script: Greek
- Now at: University of Leipzig
- Size: 27.5 cm by 21.5 cm
- Type: Byzantine text-type

Codex Tischendorfianus V or Lectionary 293 (Gregory-Aland), designated by siglum ℓ 293 (in the Gregory-Aland numbering) is a Greek manuscript of the New Testament, on parchment. Palaeographically it has been assigned to the 8th century. Scrivener labelled it as 190^{e}.

== Description ==
The codex contains lessons from the Gospel of John, Matthew, and Luke (Evangelistarium), on 89 parchment leaves (27.5 cm by 21.5 cm), with some lacunae. It is a palimpsest, the upper and younger text contains lessons from the Book of Psalms. It is dated to the 12th century.

The text is written in Greek uncial letters, in two columns per page, 20 lines per page. The manuscript contains weekday Gospel lessons. It contains music notes.

== History ==
Scrivener and Gregory dated it to the 8th or 9th century. It has been assigned by the Institute for New Testament Textual Research to the 8th century.

The manuscript was examined by Constantin von Tischendorf in 1843, who gave some extracts from the codex in his Anecdota.

The manuscript was added to the list of New Testament manuscripts by Scrivener (number 190^{e}) and Gregory (number 293^{e}). Gregory saw the manuscript in 1884.

The manuscript is not cited in the critical editions of the Greek New Testament (UBS3).

The codex is housed at the University of Leipzig (Cod. Gr. 3), in Leipzig.

== See also ==
- List of New Testament lectionaries
- Biblical manuscript
- Textual criticism
- Lectionary 292

== Bibliography ==
- C. v. Tischendorf, Anecdota sacra et profana ex Oriente et Occidente allata (1861), pp. XII, 29–34.
- Gregory, Caspar René (1900). Textkritik des Neuen Testaments. Vol. 1. Leipzig: J.C. Hinrichs’sche Buchhandlung. p. 412.
