= Soulatgé =

Commune in Occitanie, France

- Commune
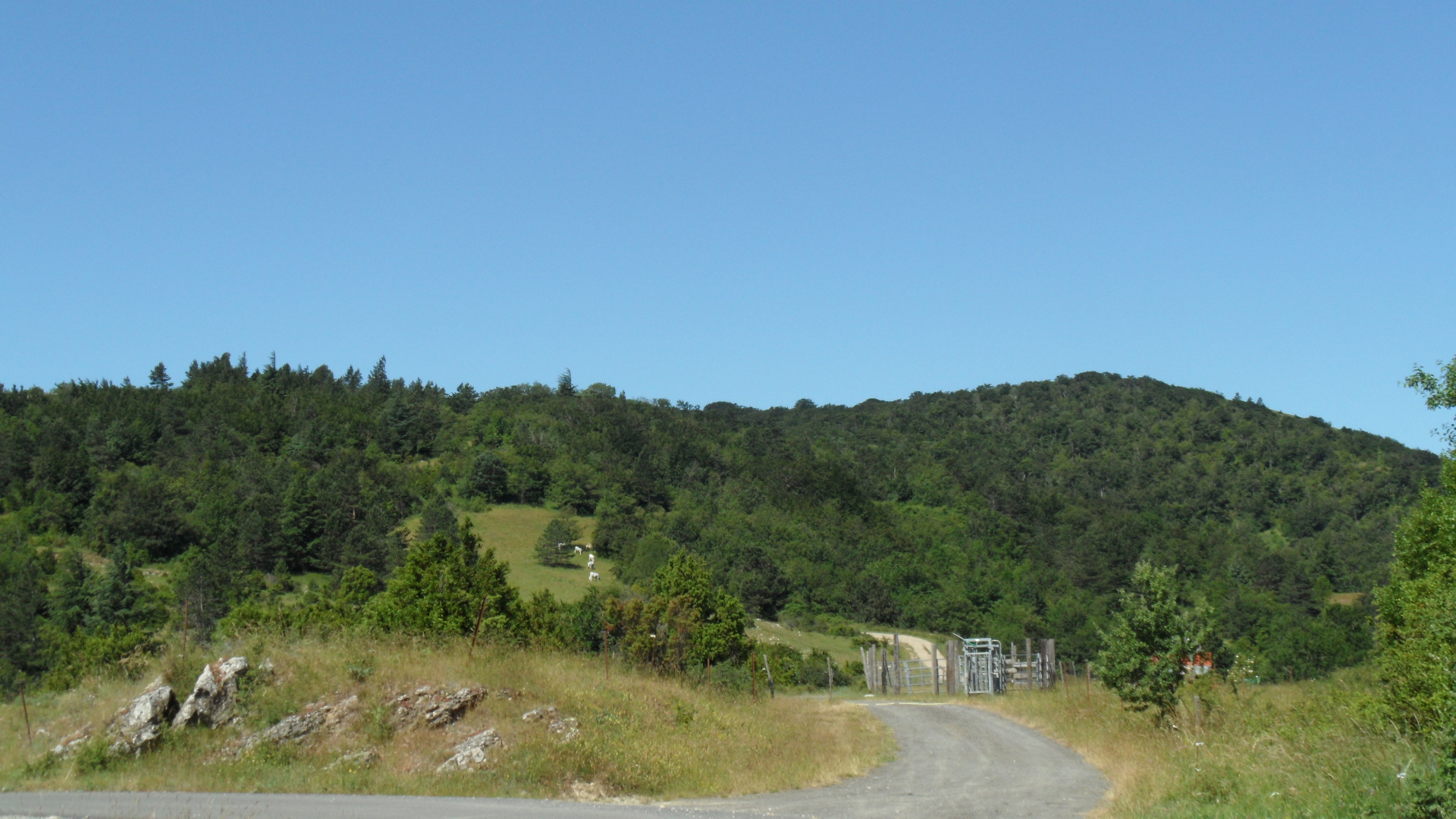
- The Col de Redoulade in Soulatgé

- Coat of arms
- Location of Soulatgé
- Location within France Location within Occitanie
- Coordinates: 42°52′45″N 2°30′17″E
- Country: France
- Region: Occitania
- Department: Aude
- Arrondissement: Narbonne
- Canton: Les Corbières

Government
  - Mayor (2020–2026): Christian Casties
- Area^{1}: 24.16 km^{2} (9.33 sq mi)
- Elevation: 373 m (1,224 ft)
- Highest elevation: 932 m (3,058 ft)
- Lowest elevation: 357 m (1,171 ft)
- Population (2023): 126
  - Density: 5.22/km^{2} (13.5/sq mi)
- Time zone: UTC+01:00 (CET)
  - Summer (DST): UTC+02:00 (CEST)
- INSEE/Postal code: 11384 /11330
- ^{1} French Land Register data, which excludes lakes, ponds, glaciers > 1 km^{2} (0.386 sq mi or 247 acres) and river estuaries.

Soulatgé (French pronunciation: [suladʒe]; Occitan: Solatge) is a commune in the Aude department in southern France.

== Population ==
Historical population
Year	Pop.	±% p.a.
1968	80	—
1975	62	−3.58%
1982	82	+4.07%
1990	90	+1.17%
1999	92	+0.24%
2007	105	+1.67%
2012	116	+2.01%
2017	128	+1.99%
2023	126	−0.26%
Source: INSEE

== See also ==
- Communes of the Aude department
