= Murder of Joan D'Alessandro =

1973 child murder in New Jersey, United States

- Location: Hillsdale, New Jersey, United States
- Date: April 19, 1973
- Attack type: Rape, murder
- Deaths: 1
- Victim: Joan D'Alessandro
- Perpetrator: Joseph McGowan
- Charges: Murder; Rape
- Convictions: Guilty plea to murder

On April 19, 1973, Joan D'Alessandro, a 7-year-old Girl Scout from New Jersey, was raped and murdered by her neighbor Joseph McGowan after she went to his house to sell cookies. McGowan, a high school teacher, pled guilty to the crime. The crime led to the passing of "Joan's Law" in New Jersey in 1997, which was amended in 2017 to state that "a person convicted of the murder of a minor under the age of 18 in the course of the commission of a sex crime will serve life imprisonment without the option of parole".

== Campaigning to prevent McGowan's parole and his eventual death in prison ==
Joan's mother later sued McGowan, while campaigning to prevent McGowan's parole prior to the passing of Joan's Law.

McGowan died in prison in June 2021.

== Coverage ==
The murder was detailed in The Killer Across the Table by John E. Douglas, and was also the subject of a documentary film.
