= Nansha Kalonji =

Belgian footballer

Personal information
- Date of birth: 16 February 1973 (age 53)
- Place of birth: Brussels, Belgium
- Height: 1.85 m (6 ft 1 in)
- Positions: Defender; striker

Youth career
- 1994–1997: Ramapo

Senior career*
Years	Team	Apps	(Gls)
1998	Central Jersey Riptide		
1999	MetroStars	19	(1)
2002–2003	Carolina Dynamo	41	(7)

Managerial career
- 2002–2003: Greensboro College (assistant)
- 2004–2006: Rutgers University–Newark
- 2006–2009: Ramapo College (assistant)
- 2009–: New Jersey City University
- * Club domestic league appearances and goals

Nansha Kalonji (born 16 February 1973) is a Belgian retired footballer who played in both defence and attack. He was most recently the manager of the Rutgers–Newark Scarlet Raiders at Rutgers–Newark.

== Player ==
Kalonji attended Ramapo College where he played on the men's soccer team from 1994 to 1997. He graduated with a bachelor's degree in social science in 2003. He was inducted into the school's Hall of Fame in 2007. He played for the Central Jersey Riptide in the USISL. In February 1999, the MetroStars selected Kalonji in the third round (thirty-first overall) of the 1999 MLS Supplemental Draft. He played nineteen games and scored one goal before being released on 23 November 1999. In 2002 and 2003, he played for the Carolina Dynamo in the fourth division Premier Development League.

== Coach ==
Kalonji began his coaching career as an assistant at Ramapo College. He then served as an assistant coach at West Orange High School before moving up to become an assistant at Greensboro College in 2002 and 2003. In 2004, he became the head coach at Rutgers University–Newark. After posting an 18–32–2 record over three seasons, Kalonji resigned on 4 November 2006.

Kalonji also holds Congolese and American nationality.
