= Paul Oudin =

French physician and medical researcher

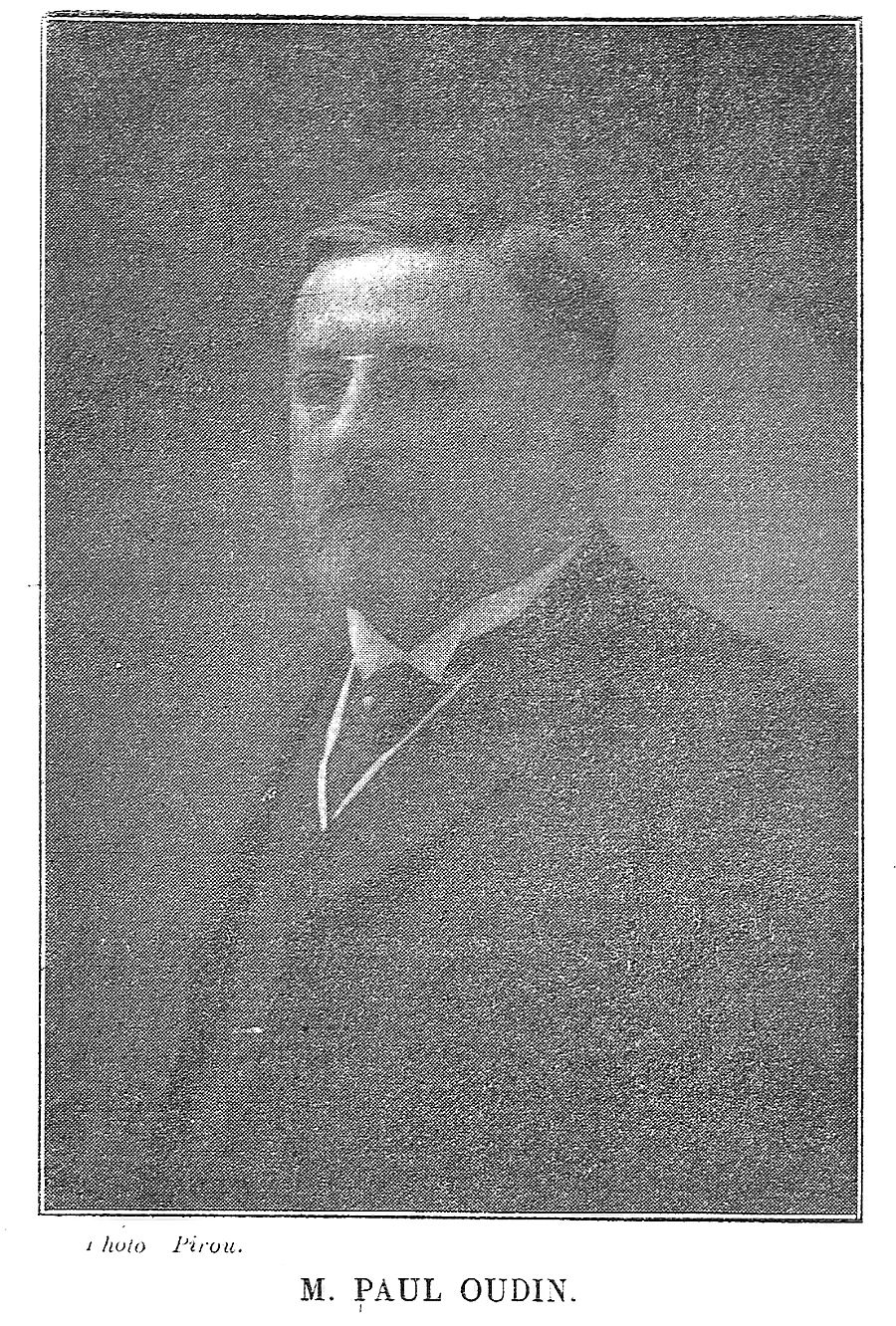
Oudin, Paul Marie

Marie-Paul Oudin (1851–1923) was a French physician and medical researcher. He was born, and later died, in Épinal. He conducted research in the Victorian era medical field of high frequency electrotherapy, the application of radio frequency electric currents to the body, and collaborated with the founder of the field, pioneering physiologist and biophysicist Dr. Jacques Arsene d'Arsonval. In 1893 he modified d'Arsonval's electrotherapy equipment by the addition of a wire coil resonator to produce higher potentials, inventing the Oudin coil. This device, very similar to a Tesla coil, could produce very high voltages from several hundred thousand to a million volts. In use, the brush discharges from a pointed electrode attached to the high voltage terminal of the coil would be played over various parts of the body to treat a variety of medical conditions. The Oudin coil was used in electrotherapy and diathermy through the 1920s.
