= Anselmo Banduri =

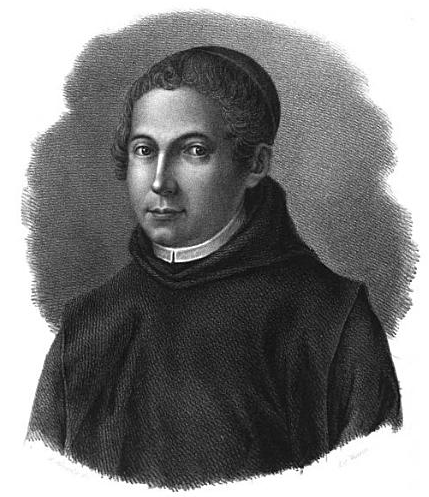
- Born: Matteo Banduri; 18 August 1671 or 1675; Ragusa, Republic of Ragusa
- Died: 4 January 1743; Paris, Kingdom of France

Academic work
- Discipline: archaeology numismatics
- Notable works: De Administrando Imperio

Anselmo Banduri (18 August 1671 or 1675 – 4 January 1743) was a Dalmatian Italian, Benedictine scholar, archaeologist and numismatologist from the Republic of Ragusa.

== Biography ==
Banduri was born in Ragusa, Dalmatia, as Matteo (Matija) Banduri, he joined the Benedictines at an early age and took the monk name Anselmo. He studied at Naples, and was eventually sent to Florence, then a flourishing center of higher studies. Here he made the acquaintance of the famous Benedictine scholar Bernard de Montfaucon, at the time traveling in Italy in search of manuscripts for his edition of the works of St. John Chrysostom. Banduri rendered him valuable services and in return was recommended to Cosimo III de' Medici, Grand Duke of Tuscany for the chair of ecclesiastical history in the University of Pavia. It was also suggested that the young Benedictine be sent to Paris for a period of preparation, and especially to acquire a sound critical sense.

After a short sojourn at Rome, Banduri arrived at Paris in 1702 and entered the Abbey of Saint-Germain-des-Prés as a pensioner of the Grand Duke of Tuscany. He soon became an apt disciple of the French Maurists and began an edition of the anti-iconoclastic writings of Nicephorus of Constantinople, of the writings of Theodore of Mopsuestia, and of other Greek ecclesiastical authors. Banduri never published these works, though as late as 1722 he announced, as near at hand, their appearance in four folio volumes. In the meantime, he was attracted by the rich treasures of Byzantine manuscript and other material in the Bibliothèque Royale and the Bibliothèque Colbert.

In 1711 he published at Paris his De Administrando Imperio (Imperium Orientale, sive Antiquitates Constantinopolitanae), a documentary illustrated work on the Byzantine Empire, based on medieval Greek manuscripts, some of which were then first made known. He also defended himself successfully against Casimir Oudin, an ex-Premonstratensian, whose attacks were made on a second-hand knowledge of Banduri's work. In 1718 he published, also at Paris, two folio volumes on the imperial coinage from Trajan Decius to the last of the Palaeologi (249–1453), Numismata Imperatorum Romanorum a Trajano Decio usque ad Palaeologos Augustos (supplement by Tanini, Rome, 1791). Of this work Father Joseph Hilarius Eckhel, S.J., prince of numismatologists, says (Doctrina Nummorum I, cviii) that it contains few important contributions. At the same time he praises the remarkable bibliography of the subject that Banduri prefixed to this work under the title of Bibliotheca nummaria sive auctorum qui de re nummaria scripserunt, reprinted by Johann Albert Fabricius (Hamburg, 1719).

In 1715 Banduri was made an honorary foreign member of the Académie des Inscriptions, and in 1724 was appointed librarian to the Duke of Orléans; he had in vain solicited a similar office at Florence on the death of the famous Antonio Magliabechi.

He died in Paris.

=== Works ===
- Banduri, Anselmus (1711). Imperium Orientale sive Antiquitates Constantinopolitanae. Vol. 1. Parisius: Coignard.
  - Banduri, Anselmus (1729) [1711]. Imperium Orientale sive Antiquitates Constantinopolitanae. Vol. 1. Venetia: Javarina.
- Banduri, Anselmus (1711). Imperium Orientale sive Antiquitates Constantinopolitanae. Vol. 2. Parisius: Coignard.
  - Banduri, Anselmus (1729) [1711]. Imperium Orientale sive Antiquitates Constantinopolitanae. Vol. 2. Venetia: Javarina.
