= Roquetaillade =

Commune in Aude, France

- Part of Roquetaillade-et-Conilhac
- Coat of arms
- Location of Roquetaillade
- Location within France Location within Occitanie
- Coordinates: 42°59′42″N 2°12′00″E
- Country: France
- Region: Occitania
- Department: Aude
- Arrondissement: Limoux
- Canton: La Haute-Vallée de l'Aude
- Commune: Roquetaillade-et-Conilhac
- Area^{1}: 11.35 km^{2} (4.38 sq mi)
- Elevation: 350 m (1,150 ft)
- Highest elevation: 654 m (2,146 ft)
- Lowest elevation: 240 m (790 ft)
- Population (2023): 199
  - Density: 17.5/km^{2} (45.4/sq mi)
- Time zone: UTC+01:00 (CET)
  - Summer (DST): UTC+02:00 (CEST)
- Postal code: 11300
- ^{1} French Land Register data, which excludes lakes, ponds, glaciers > 1 km^{2} (0.386 sq mi or 247 acres) and river estuaries.

Roquetaillade (French pronunciation: [ʁɔktajad]; Languedocien: Ròcatalhada) is a former commune in the Aude department in southern France. On 1 January 2019, it was merged into the new commune Roquetaillade-et-Conilhac.

== See also ==
- Communes of the Aude department
