= Pensacola Barracudas (soccer) =

- Full name: Pensacola Barracudas
- Founded: 1998
- Dissolved: 1998
- League: USISL D-3 Pro League
- 1998: Southeast Division, 4th
Home colours

The Pensacola Barracudas were an American soccer team that played in Pensacola, Florida.

The Pensacola Barracudas were an American soccer team based in Pensacola, Florida that played in the single 1998 season of the USISL D-3 Pro League, a third-division professional league sanctioned by the United States Soccer Federation.

The team was one of three expansion clubs added to the league prior to the 1998 campaign, alongside Western Massachusetts and Northern Virginia.

== History ==
The Barracudas competed in the league's Southeast Division during its lone season of existence. The club played an 18-game schedule, finishing with a 5–13 record (1–1 in shootouts), placing fourth in the division behind the Miami Breakers (17–1–0), Orlando Nighthawks (12–6–0), and Southwest Florida Manatees (8–10–0–1). They scored 21 goals and allowed 57, failing to qualify for the playoffs or entry into the U.S. Open Cup. The team folded after the season amid a broader contraction in lower-division soccer.

== Year-by-year ==
| Year | Division | League | Reg. season | Playoffs | U.S. Open Cup |
|---|---|---|---|---|---|
| 1998 | 3 | USISL D-3 Pro League | 4th, Southeast; 5–13 (1–1 SO) | Did not qualify | Did not qualify |
