= Roanoke Wrath =

The Roanoke Wrath were an American soccer team that played in Roanoke, Virginia. Established as a replacement for the Roanoke RiverDawgs, the Wrath were under the local ownership group Roanoke Pro Soccer, Inc. and played the majority of their home games at the former Victory Stadium.

== Year-by-year ==
Year	Division	League	Reg. season	Playoffs	Open Cup
1998	3	USISL D-3 Pro League	4th, Atlantic	Division Finals	Did not qualify
1999	3	USL D-3 Pro League	6th, Atlantic	Did not qualify	Did not qualify
2000	3	USL D-3 Pro League	6th, Southern	Did not qualify	Did not qualify
