= Tallahassee Tempest =

The Tallahassee Tempest were an American soccer team that played in Tallahassee, Florida.

== Year-by-year ==
Year	Division	League	Reg. season	Playoffs	Open Cup
1998	3	USISL D-3 Pro League	5th, Southeast	Did not qualify	Did not qualify
