= Delaware Wizards =

- Full name: Delaware Wizards
- Nickname: The Wiz
- Founded: 1993
- Dissolved: 2000
- Ground: Randy White Stadium at McKean High
- Capacity: 2,000
- Chairman: Robert Patch
- Manager: Wayne McKinnely
- League: USISL D2 Professional League
- 2000: 5th (overall)

The Delaware Wizards were a professional soccer club based in Wilmington and New Castle, Delaware. The team played their first game in 1993 and their last in 2000. They played in the USISL. They were considered DC United's farm team but ended up folding due to financial issues and losing players to other clubs. Many players went to MLS and other USL teams.

The original team was founded by owners John Gross and David Fischer. The 1993 team was head coached by Joe Brown and assistant coach John Barry. Notable players included Tim Jones, Chris Morgan, Eric Smith, Pat Walsh, Dave Whitcraft, Lance Johnson, Derek Bujak, John Sturmfels, Andy Barat, Andy Logar, Manny Oudin, and Tim Jones who led the scoring with 5 goals and 5 assists. They finished the inaugural season 10-6 in second place behind the Greensboro Dynamo who went on to win the USISL Championship. 1993 U.S. Interregional Soccer League (outdoor) season. The Wizards’ accomplishments on and off the field (the 3,300 average attendance led the league) earned them the 1993 USISL Achievement Award.

The Wizards went on to add new talent for the 1994 season such as Junior Armstrong, Erik Imler and Simon Cotton.

In 2007, David Whitcraft was inducted into the Delaware Sports Museum and Hall of Fame for his efforts as the first captain of the team.

In 2008, a reincarnation of the Delaware Wizards was formed playing amateur soccer. Led by a group of former fans and ball boys of the original Delaware Wizards, they have enjoyed modest success. As of 2009, they currently play in the New Castle County Soccer League.

== Year-by-year ==
Year	Division	League	Reg. season	Playoffs	Open Cup
1993	N/A	USISL	2nd, Atlantic	Divisional Finals	Did not enter
1994	3	USISL	5th, Northeast	Midweek Challenge	Did not enter
1995	3	USISL Pro League	2nd, Coastal	Divisional Finals	Did not qualify
1995/96	N/A	USISL Indoor	5th, Northeast	Did not qualify	N/A
1996	3	USISL Select League	4th, North Atlantic	2nd Round	Did not qualify
1996/97	N/A	USISL I-League	Limited schedule, 1 game	Did not qualify	N/A
1997	3	USISL D-3 Pro League	5th, Mid-Atlantic	Did not qualify	Did not qualify
1997/98	N/A	USISL I-League	Limited schedule, 2 games	Did not qualify	N/A
1998	3	USISL D-3 Pro League	1st, Atlantic	Quarterfinals	2nd Round
1999	3	USL D3-Pro League	6th, Northern	Did not qualify	Did not qualify
2000	3	USL D3-Pro League	7th, Northern	Did not qualify	Did not qualify
