= Orlando Nighthawks =

Soccer club

The Orlando Nighthawks were a soccer club that competed in the USL Premier Development League from 1997 to 1999.

The club started as the Daytona Tigers and became the Orlando Nighthawks in 1998. The team's head coach was Steve Richards. He was assisted by Gerry Queen. The team's general manager was Azi Khan. Khan died halfway through the 1998 season. Following Khan's death and a lack of commitment on the part of New Jersey–based owner Phil Neto, the team returned with a depleted squad due to other players signing off to play for the Central Florida Kraze and Cocoa Expos and only won one game. Following the season, the team folded.

== Year-by-year ==
Year	Division	League	Reg. season	Playoffs	Open Cup
1997	3	USISL D-3 Pro League	7th, South Atlantic	Did not qualify	Did not qualify
1998	3	USISL D-3 Pro League	2nd, Southeast	Semifinals	3rd Round
1999	"4"	USL PDL	9th, Southeast	Did not qualify	Did not qualify
