= 1993–94 U.S. Interregional Soccer League (indoor) season =

The 1993–94 United States Interregional Soccer League season was an American indoor soccer season run by the United States Interregional Soccer League during the winter of 1993 to 1994.

== Regular season ==
The 1993-1994 USISL indoor season began the first weekend of December 1993 and ended in February 1994. Several new teams entered the league this season. Only eleven teams had competed in the 1992-1993 indoor season. By the fall of 1993, the Tucson Amigos, Lubbock Lazers, Arizona Cotton, San Antonio Generals and Dallas Kickers had all announced they would not play again during the 1993-1994 season. This left only five confirmed teams for the upcoming season. Consequently, the league brought in the Toledo Twisters, Baltimore Bays, Greensboro Dynamo, Richmond Kickers, all in the newly created Northern Division as well as the Cocoa Expos, Orlando Lions, Texas Lightning and Tulsa Roughnecks. The Dynamo withdrew after three games and the Toledo Twisters after eight. The Baltimore Bays, new to the indoor league, tied the Atlanta Magic, winners of the past two seasons, for the best record. However, the Bays received top seeding for the playoffs on account of their better goal differential.

=== Northern Division ===
Place	Team	GP	W	L	GF	GA	GD	Points
1	Baltimore Bays	12	12	0	174	42	+132	48
2	Richmond Kickers	12	7	5	70	70	+0	28
3	Greensboro Dynamo	3	1	2	20	20	+0	4
4	Toledo Twisters	8	0	8	23	117	-94	0

=== Southeast Division ===
Place	Team	GP	W	L	GF	GA	GD	Points
1	Atlanta Magic	12	12	0	109	39	+70	48
2	Chattanooga Express	12	8	4	82	69	+13	32
3	Cocoa Expos	12	6	6	50	58	-8	24
4	Orlando Lions	12	6	6	45	44	-1	24
4	Knoxville Impact	12	5	7	85	82	+3	20
4	Nashville Metros	12	1	11	54	120	-66	4

=== South Central Division ===
Place	Team	GP	W	L	GF	GA	GD	Points
1	Tulsa Roughnecks	12	9	3	107	88	+19	36
2	Texas Lightning	12	6	6	92	98	-6	24
3	Oklahoma City Warriors	12	6	6	101	79	+22	24
3	Texas Arsenal	12	3	9	57	92	-35	12

== Playoffs ==
=== Sizzling Four ===
February 25, 1994
8:15 PM (EST)

Baltimore Bays (MD)	6-8	Chattanooga Express (TN)
Eric Spalt; Derrick Marcano; Joe Layfield	(Report)	Roger LaGuerre; Salomon Kidane; Al Reinhart; James Van Steenburg; Dennis Dergelev; Eddie Armand

DuBurns Arena, Baltimore, Maryland

February 25, 1994
10:30 PM (EST)

Atlanta Magic (GA)	6-2	Tulsa Roughnecks (OK)

DuBurns Arena, Baltimore, Maryland

February 26, 1994
3:00 PM (EST)

Baltimore Bays (MD)	15-10	Tulsa Roughnecks (OK)
Mark Mettrick; Billy Ronson; Joe Layfield; Jeff Nattans; Joe Koziol	(Report)

DuBurns Arena, Baltimore, Maryland

February 26, 1994
5:30 PM (EST)

Atlanta Magic (GA)	11-3	Chattanooga Express (TN)

DuBurns Arena, Baltimore, Maryland

== Third place game ==
February 27, 1994

Baltimore Bays (MD)	2-1	Chattanooga Express (TN)
Derrick Marcano	(Report)

DuBurns Arena, Baltimore, Maryland

== Final ==
February 27, 1994
3:00 PM (EST)

Atlanta Magic (GA)	8-3	Chattanooga Express (TN)
Chris Hellenkamp; Dennis Jerkunica; Brian Moore	(Report)

DuBurns Arena, Baltimore, Maryland

MVP: Brian Moore

== Points leaders ==
Rank	Scorer	Club	GP	Goals	Assists	Points
1	Virgil Stevens	Tulsa Roughnecks	12	28	11	67
2	John Dugan	Richmond Kickers	7	24	13	61
2	Billy Ronson	Baltimore Bays	11	16	29	61
4	Jason Maricle	Tulsa Roughnecks	12	18	23	59
5	Chris Hellenkamp	Atlanta Magic	12	17	17	54
6	Joe Layfield	Baltimore Bays	11	22	8	52
7	Willie Molano	Texas Lightning	9	17	16	50
7	Matt Brences	Chattanooga Express	12	23	4	50
9	Rob Elliott	Baltimore Bays	9	17	12	46
9	Caleb Suri	Atlanta Magic	12	19	8	46

== Honors ==
- Most Valuable Player: Brian Moore
- Top Goal Scorer: Virgil Stevens
- Top Goalkeeper: Yaro Dachniwsky
- Coach of the Year: Charlie Morgan
- Rookie of the Year: Ed Quick
