= 1994–95 U.S. Indoor Soccer League season =

Indoor soccer league season

The 1994–95 United States Indoor Soccer League season was an American soccer season run by the United Systems of Independent Soccer Leagues during the winter of 1994 to 1995.

== Regular season ==
=== North/South Division ===
Place	Team	GP	W	L	GF	GA	GD	Points
1	Baltimore Bays	12	10	2	106	69	+37	40
2	Cocoa Expos	9	6	3	59	55	+4	24
3	Orlando Lions	12	6	6	62	61	+1	19
4	Brandon Braves	12	4	8	69	75	-6	16

=== Mid-South Division ===
Place	Team	GP	W	L	GF	GA	GD	Points
1	Atlanta Magic	12	11	1	110	63	+47	44
2	Knoxville Impact	12	7	5	110	81	+29	28
3	Chattanooga Express	12	6	6	61	67	-6	24
4	Nashville Metros	12	2	10	60	123	-63	8

=== South Central Division ===
Place	Team	GP	W	L	GF	GA	GD	Points
1	Oklahoma City Slickers	10	8	2	74	50	+24	32
2	Tulsa Roughnecks	10	5	5	81	73	+8	20
3	Mesquite Kickers	10	5	5	66	63	+3	20

== Playoffs ==
Each of the three division winners received automatic entry into the playoffs. Then, the next two teams with the best records also entered the playoffs. Finally, the host team, the Tulsa Roughnecks, also entered the playoffs.

=== Sizzlin’ Six ===
February 24, 1995
6:00 PM (CST)

Baltimore Bays (MD)	8–7	Knoxville Impact (TN)

Expo Square Pavilion, Tulsa, Oklahoma

February 24, 1995
8:00 PM (CST)

Tulsa Roughnecks (OK)	4–3	Chattanooga Express (TN)

Expo Square Pavilion, Tulsa, Oklahoma

February 25, 1995
11:00 AM (CST)

Oklahoma City Slickers (OK)	8–7	Knoxville Impact (TN)

Expo Square Pavilion, Tulsa, Oklahoma

February 25, 1995
1:00 PM (CST)

Atlanta Magic (GA)	4–2	Chattanooga Express (TN)

Expo Square Pavilion, Tulsa, Oklahoma

February 25, 1995
6:00 PM (CST)

Oklahoma City Slickers (OK)	7–4	Baltimore Bays (MD)

Expo Square Pavilion, Tulsa, Oklahoma

February 25, 1995
8:00 PM (CST)

Tulsa Roughnecks (OK)	2–5	Atlanta Magic (GA)

Expo Square Pavilion, Tulsa, Oklahoma

=== Final ===
February 26, 1995
2:00 PM (CST)

Atlanta Magic (GA)	6–3	Oklahoma City Slickers (OK)
Mo Suri

DuBurns Arena, Baltimore, Maryland

MVP:

=== Points leaders ===
Rank	Scorer	Club	GP	Goals	Assists	Points
1	Juha Miettinen	Knoxville Impact	10	22	15	59
2	Chris Hellenkamp	Richmond Kickers	12	21	13	55
3	Mo Suri	Atlanta Magic	9	16	9	41
3	Virgil Stevens	Tulsa Roughnecks	9	13	15	41
5	Eric Reidlbauer	Baltimore Bays	12	17	6	40
6	Mark Mettrick	Baltimore Bays	11	15	8	38

=== Honors ===
- Most Valuable Player: Mo Suri
- Top Goal Scorer: Juha Mieteinen
- Top Goalkeeper: Brent Jameson
- Coach of the Year: Charlie Morgan
- Rookie of the Year: Colby Williams
