= Houska (surname) =

Houska or Houška (feminine: Housková, Houšková) are Czech surnames. Notable people with the surname include:

- David Houska (born 1993), Czech footballer
- John Houska (born 1956), American soccer player
- Jovanka Houska (born 1980), English chess player
- Pavel Houška (born 1984), Czech basketball player
- Vincent Houška (1766–1840), Czech classical composer and musician
