= Billy Ronson =

English footballer (1957–2015)

Personal information
- Date of birth: 22 January 1957
- Place of birth: Fleetwood, England
- Date of death: 8 April 2015 (aged 58)
- Place of death: Perry Hall, Maryland, United States
- Height: 5 ft 4 in (1.63 m)
- Position: Midfielder

Senior career*
Years	Team	Apps	(Gls)
1974–1979	Blackpool	128	(12)
1978	→ Fort Lauderdale Strikers (loan)	17	(1)
1979–1981	Cardiff City	90	(4)
1981–1982	Wrexham	32	(1)
1982–1986	Barnsley	113	(3)
1986	→ Birmingham City (loan)	2	(0)
1986	Blackpool	3	(0)
1986–1992	Baltimore Blast (indoor)	280	(112)
1992	Tampa Bay Rowdies		
1992–1993	Detroit Rockers (indoor)	29	(19)
1993–1995	Baltimore Bays (indoor)	?	(?)
1994	Baltimore Bays		
1995	Pittsburgh Stingers (indoor)	8	(5)
1996	Washington Warthogs (indoor)	24	(14)
1996–1997	Baltimore Bays (indoor)		
1998–1999	Baltimore Spirit (indoor)	17	(5)

Managerial career
- 1993–1997: Goucher College
- 1993–1995: Baltimore Bays (assistant)
- 1996–1998: Baltimore Bays
- 1998–1999: Baltimore Spirit (assistant)
- * Club domestic league appearances and goals

William Ronson (22 January 1957 – 8 April 2015) was an English footballer who spent twelve seasons in the English leagues, one in the North American Soccer League, six in the Major Indoor Soccer League and another seven years in a variety of lower division indoor and outdoor leagues in the United States. He also coached at the collegiate and professional levels.

== Playing career ==
Ronson, the son of Fleetwood stalwart Percy Ronson, began his career at Blackpool, making his debut in March 1975 against Nottingham Forest. He originally struggled to break into the side but eventually managed to establish himself in the first team. In 1978, he went on loan to the Fort Lauderdale Strikers of the North American Soccer League. He was unable to prevent Blackpool's relegation during the 1977–78 season and spent one more year at the club before joining Cardiff City for a fee of £130,000, a club record at the time. He missed very few games in his two years at Ninian Park before growing disenchanted with the club's lack of progress and leaving to join Wrexham.

His only season at Wrexham ended in relegation, and he left to join Barnsley. He became popular at the Yorkshire club before falling out with manager Allan Clarke and being loaned to Birmingham City before being released and returning to Blackpool on non-contract terms. He moved to America in 1986 to join the Baltimore Blast of the Major Indoor Soccer League. He remained with the Blast for six seasons. The Blast collapsed at the end of the 1991–92 season. In February 2009, the reconstituted Blast inducted Ronson into the team's Hall of Fame. In June 1992, he signed with the Tampa Bay Rowdies of the American Professional Soccer League. In 1994, he joined the Baltimore Bays of the USISL. On 19 November 1992, he joined the Detroit Rockers of the National Professional Soccer League. In the fall of 1993, he signed with the Baltimore Bays as that team prepared for the 1993–94 USISL indoor season. He was the 1994 Rookie of the Year. He continued with the Bays, playing the 1994 outdoor and 1994–95 indoor seasons. On 26 July 1995, he signed with the Pittsburgh Stingers of the Continental Indoor Soccer League. In August 1995, Ronson was in an auto accident which put him out for the rest of the season. In June 1996, he joined the Washington Warthogs of the CISL. At the end of the 1996 summer indoor season, Ronson returned to the Bays where he became a player-coach for the 1996–97 USISL indoor season. He was the league's points leader and MVP. In December 1998, he joined the Baltimore Spirit on a 15-day contract.

== Coaching ==
In 1993, Ronson became the head coach of the Goucher College NCAA Division III women's soccer team. He coached the team through the 1997 season, compiling a 41–44–4 record. In 1994, he became an assistant coach with the Baltimore Bays. He left the Bays in 1995 to play for the Pittsburgh Stingers then returned as a player-head coach of the Bays for the 1996–1997 indoor season. After retiring, Ronson had spells as assistant coach and later assistant general manager at Baltimore Blast. In 2009, he was inducted into the Baltimore Blast hall of fame.

His last known employer was an American company named Action Business Systems.

He died of natural causes at his home in Perry Hall, Baltimore County, on 8 April 2015.
