= Put a Spell on You =

Studio album by Casey Abrams
- Released: March 16, 2018
- Studio: Hirsch Center
- Genre: Jazz
- Length: 49:33
- Label: Chesky Records
- Producer: David Chesky

Casey Abrams chronology
Casey Abrams (2012)	Put a Spell on You (2018)	Jazz (2019)

Put a Spell on You is Casey Abrams' first release on Chesky Records and features the former American Idol contestant returning to his jazz roots. Abrams recorded the album over two days at the Hirsch Center in Brooklyn, New York, a decommissioned church featuring acoustics termed "ethereal" by Abrams. The album released on March 16, 2018, and debuted at #5 on the Billboard Jazz Charts.

== Track listing ==
1. "Robot Lovers" – 3:31
2. "Meet the Flintstones" – 2:55
3. "Cougartown" – 4:22
4. "I Put a Spell on You" – 2:41
5. "Lost and Looking" – 5:28
6. "Let's Make Out" – 4:17
7. "Nature Boy" – 3:56
8. "Never Know" – 3:58
9. "Georgia on My Mind" – 4:42
10. "High Drunk Love You" – 3:56
11. "Have You Ever Seen the Rain" – 3:22
12. "Moon Song" – 2:52
13. "Take the A Train" – 3:33

== Personnel ==
- Casey Abrams - Bass, Vocals, 12 String Guitar
- Taylor Tesler - Guitar, Vocals
- Jacob Scesney - Saxophone, Percussion
- David Chesky - Producer
- Norman Chesky - Producer
- Nicholas Prout - Recording, Editing, Mastering
- Janelle Costa - Second Engineer
- Rich Cerbini - Assistant Engineer
- Paul Machado - General Assistant
