= Tennant McVea =

Soccer coach and former player

Personal information
- Full name: James Tennant McVea
- Date of birth: 20 January 1988 (age 38)
- Place of birth: Ballybeen, Northern Ireland
- Position: Centre back

Team information
- Current team: Lionsbridge FC

College career
Years	Team	Apps	(Gls)
2006–2009	Loyola Greyhounds		

Senior career*
Years	Team	Apps	(Gls)
2006	Ards	23	(0)
2008–2009	Fredericksburg Gunners	20	(2)
2010	FC Lahti	26	(0)
2011–2012	Norfolk SharX (indoor)	20	(2)
2014–2017	Virginia Beach City FC		
2018–2023	Lionsbridge FC	52	(2)

International career
2006	Northern Ireland U19	1	
2006	Northern Ireland U18	3	
2005–2006	Northern Ireland U18 Schools	3	
2005	Northern Ireland U17	1	

Managerial career
- 2008–2009: Fredericksburg Gunners Youth
- 2011: Northern Ireland U18 Schools (asst.)
- 2012: Beach FC Youth
- 2013–2015: Old Dominion Monarchs (asst.)
- 2016: Elon Phoenix (asst.)
- 2017–2024: Old Dominion Monarchs (assoc. head coach)
- 2024–: Old Dominion Monarchs
- * Club domestic league appearances and goals as of 11 May 2020

James Tennant McVea (born 20 January 1988, in Ballybeen) is a Northern Irish former footballer, and manager. He has served as head coach for Old Dominion University men's soccer team since 2024.

== Career ==
=== Early career in Northern Ireland ===
McVea played youth football for Ards FC in 2004. While at Ards, he made multiple international appearances for Northern Ireland at U17, U18, and U19 levels. He moved to the United States to attend and play college soccer at Loyola University Maryland, after being scouted by the then-coach for the Greyhounds, Mark Mettrick.

=== College ===
McVea played for four years at Loyola. In his freshman season, he was named to the Metro Atlantic Athletic Conference (MAAC) All-Rookie, and MAAC Second Team squad. He was named the MAAC Defensive Player of the Year, and earned spots on the league First Team, and the NSCAA/adidas North Atlantic Regional first team in his sophomore year.

In his junior year he was again named MAAC Defensive Player of the Year, MAAC First Team, and the NSCAA/adidas North Atlantic Region first team. He was also awarded NSCAA/adidas 1st Team All-American honors, and was named to the MAC Hermann Trophy watch list.

As a senior, McVea was again on the MAC Hermann Trophy watch list and was named MAAC Defensive Player of the Year for a third straight year, making him the first player to receive the accolade in three consecutive seasons. He was also a MAAC First Team selection, NSCAA/adidas North Atlantic Region first team selection, and was nominated for the prestigious Lowe's Senior CLASS Award. He finished his college career having played 83 games for the Greyhounds, with 6 goals and 2 assists to his name. He was named to the MAAC 40th Anniversary Men's Soccer Team on September 1, 2020.

=== Professional ===
McVea turned professional in 2010 when he signed to play in Finland for FC Lahti in the Veikkausliiga. He made his professional debut on April 17, 2010, in the team's 2010 season opener against FF Jaro.

McVae returned to the US to play for the now-defunct Norfolk SharX of the Major Indoor Soccer League in the 2011/2012 season.

=== Coaching ===
In 2011, McVea served as assistant coach of the Northern Ireland Schools Football Association in Belfast before returning to the US.

He was an assistant coach for the Old Dominion Monarchs men's soccer team from 2013 to 2015, including during the team's 2014 Conference USA championship run. McVea left to serve as assistant coach to the Elon University men's soccer team for the 2016 season, but returned to ODU in 2017 as associate coach. He was named head coach of the ODU team in 2023, following the retirement of long-time coach Alan Dawson.

== Personal life ==
McVea graduated from Loyola in 2009 with a degree in public relations.

He lives in Virginia Beach, Virginia with his wife and two children.
