= List of Loyola Greyhounds men's basketball head coaches =

The following is a list of Loyola Greyhounds men's basketball head coaches. There have been 21 head coaches of the Greyhounds in their 113-season history.

Loyola's current head coach is Tavaras Hardy. He was hired as the Greyhounds' head coach in March 2018, replacing G. G. Smith, who resigned after the 2017–18 season.

No.	Tenure	Coach	Years	Record	Pct.
–	1908–1912	No coach	4	39–19	.672
1	1912–1922 (Note: Loyola did not field a team between 1917 and 1919.); 1923–1926	William Schuerholz	11	67–70	.489
2	1922–1923	Stan Cook	1	6–5	.545
3	1926–1928	Pat Miller	2	11–24	.314
4	1928–1929; 1930–1934	Tony Comerford	5	43–34	.558
5	1929–1930	John Menton	1	12–7	.632
6	1934–1937	William Liston	3	27–30	.474
7	1937–1944; 1945–1961	Lefty Reitz	23	349–227	.606
8	1944–1945	Albert Barthelme	1	10–12	.455
9	1961–1974	Nap Doherty	13	165–153	.519
10	1974–1976	Tom O'Connor	2	30–23	.566
11	1976–1981	Gary Dicovitsky	5	72–59	.550
12	1981–1982	William Burke	1	11–16	.407
13	1982–1989	Mark Amatucci	7	85–115	.425
14	1989–1993	Tom Schneider	4	32–79	.288
15	1993–1994	Skip Prosser	1	17–13	.567
16	1994–1997	Brian Ellerbe	3	34–47	.420
17	1997–2000	Dino Gaudio	3	32–52	.381
18	2000–2004	Scott Hicks	4	16–97	.142
19	2004–2013	Jimmy Patsos	9	145–135	.518
20	2013–2018	G. G. Smith	5	56–98	.364
21	2018–present	Tavaras Hardy	5	59–85	.410
Totals		21 coaches	113 seasons	1,332–1,411	.486
Records updated through end of 2022–23 season Source
