= Jeff Nattans =

American soccer player

Personal information
- Full name: Jeffrey A. Nattans
- Place of birth: Baltimore, Maryland, United States
- Date of death: September 2, 2026
- Height: 6 ft 2 in (1.88 m)
- Position: Defender

Youth career
- 1986–1989: Loyola Greyhounds

Senior career*
| Years | Team | Apps | (Gls) |
| 1990–1991 | Maryland Bays | | |
| 1993–1994 | Baltimore Bays | | |
| 1993–1994 | Baltimore Bays (indoor) | | |
| 1996 | Baltimore Bays | | |
- * Club domestic league appearances and goals

Jeff Nattans was an American retired soccer defender who played professionally in the American Professional Soccer League and USISL Pro League.

Nattans graduated from Calvert Hall College High School. He attended Loyola University Maryland. He played on the men's soccer team from 1986 to 1989, earning Academic All American recognition in 1988 and 1989. Nattans also played on the school's basketball team of which he was co-captain during the 1988–89 season. He graduated summa cum laude. Nattans also earned a master's degree in business administration from Harvard. On May 9, 2008, Loyola inducted Nattans into its Athletic Hall of Fame.

In 1990, Nattans turned professional with the Maryland Bays of the American Professional Soccer League. That fall, the Bays, with Nattans starting and going all ninety minutes, defeated the San Francisco Bay Blackhawks for the championship. In 1991, he played six games for Maryland. In 1993, Nattans returned to playing with the Baltimore Bays of the USISL. He played for the Bays during both the 1993 and 1994 outdoor seasons as well as the 1993–94 USISL indoor season. Nattans spent the USISL Pro League season with the Bays then retired.
