= Joe Koziol =

American soccer player (born 1967)

Personal information
- Date of birth: March 26, 1967 (age 59)
- Place of birth: Passaic, New Jersey, U.S.
- Height: 5 ft 9 in (1.75 m)
- Positions: Forward; midfielder

College career
Years	Team	Apps	(Gls)
1985–1988	Loyola Greyhounds		

Senior career*
Years	Team	Apps	(Gls)
1989–1990	Boston Bolts	?	(8)
1989–1991	Cleveland Crunch (indoor)	50	(10)
1991–1992	Baltimore Blast (indoor)	39	(18)
1992–1993	Baltimore Spirit (indoor)	40	(41)
1993–1997	Baltimore Bays (indoor)		
1994	Baltimore Spirit (indoor)	5	(0)
1994–1997	Baltimore Bays		
1994–1997	Washington Warthogs (indoor)	83	(38)
- * Club domestic league appearances and goals

Joe Koziol (born March 26, 1967) is an American retired soccer player who played professionally in the American Professional Soccer League, Major Indoor Soccer League and the National Professional Soccer League. He also won three indoor USISL titles with the Baltimore Bays.

== Youth ==
Koziol, younger brother of Stan Koziol, was born in Passaic, but grew up in Clifton, New Jersey. Growing up, he played for several local youth clubs including Polish Youth Club, Wayne Sports Friends and Thistle S.C. He graduated from Clifton High School in Clifton. Koziol attended Loyola University Maryland, playing on the men's soccer team from 1985 to 1988. He was a 1988 Third Team All American.

== Professional ==
In 1989, Koziol turned professional with the Boston Bolts of the American Soccer League. He joined the team at mid-season, continued to live in Baltimore, but commuted to Boston for games and practices. The Bolts went to the league championship where they fell to the Fort Lauderdale Strikers. In 1990, Koziol continued to play outdoor soccer with the Bolts, now playing in the American Professional Soccer League. In 1989, the Cleveland Crunch selected Koziol in the first round of the Major Indoor Soccer League Draft. On September 19, 1989, Koziol signed with the Crunch where he played two winter indoor seasons. In 1991, the Crunch released Koziol. On August 20, 1991, the Baltimore Blast signed Koziol as a free agent. When both the MISL and the Blast ceased operations in 1992, Koziol moved to the Baltimore Spirit of the National Professional Soccer League, signing with the team in August 1992. In 1993, Koziol refused to join the Spirit in the fall of 1993 and instead signed with the Baltimore Bays for the 1993–94 USISL indoor season. The Bays finished third in the playoffs which ended on February 27, 1994. Koziol then joined the Spirit as the team prepared for the NPSL playoffs. Once the NPSL playoffs were over, Koziol rejoined the Bays as they prepared for the 1994 USISL outdoor season. However, he left the team at mid-season to join the Washington Warthogs of the Continental Indoor Soccer League. This set a pattern for the next three years. Koziol would play for the Bays during the USISL indoor season during the winter, then begin the USISL outdoor season with the Bays in the spring. In August, he would leave the Bays and join the Warthogs for the CISL season. From 1994 to 1996, Koziol played 65 games, scoring 33 goals for the Warthogs. The Warthogs folded in 1997 and the Bays folded in 1998. Koziol retired at the end of the 1997–98 USISL I-League season.

May 2012, Koziol was inducted into the Maryland Soccer Hall of Fame.
