= Caleb Suri =

American soccer player-coach

Personal information
- Date of birth: May 30, 1966 (age 60)
- Place of birth: Chino, California, United States
- Positions: Forward; defender

Youth career
- 1983: Don Antonio Lugo High School

Senior career*
Years	Team	Apps	(Gls)
1984	San Diego Sockers	6	(0)
1984–1986	San Diego Sockers (indoor)	6	(0)
1985	→ Tulsa Roughnecks (loan)		
1986	San Diego Nomads		
1986–1987	Louisville Thunder (indoor)	68	(4)
1987–1988	Milwaukee Wave (indoor)	16	(3)
1988–1989	Dayton Dynamo (indoor)	35	(5)
1990–1991	Atlanta Attack (indoor)	40	(5)
1991–1994	Atlanta Magic (indoor)		
1994	Atlanta Magic		
1995	Chattanooga Express		
1995–1996	Atlanta Magic (indoor)		
1996	Atlanta Ruckus		

Managerial career
- 1995–1996: Atlanta Magic
- * Club domestic league appearances and goals

Caleb Suri is a retired American soccer player who played professionally in the North American Soccer League, Major Indoor Soccer League, American Indoor Soccer Association and USISL.

In 1984, Suri, older brother of Mo Suri, graduated from Don Antonio Lugo High School. In May 1984, the San Diego Sockers of the North American Soccer League signed Suri to an apprentice contract. He played six games during the outdoor season. He went on to play two seasons with the Sockers in the Major Indoor Soccer League. In 1985, he played on loan with the Tulsa Roughnecks who were playing an independent exhibition schedule. In 1986, he played for the San Diego Nomads of the Western Soccer Alliance. In the fall of 1986, Suri signed as a free agent with the Louisville Thunder of the American Indoor Soccer Association. When the Thunder folded, the Milwaukee Wave selected him in the dispersal draft. He played sixteen games for the Wave during the 1987–1988 AISA season. On October 27, 1988, Suri signed with the Dayton Dynamo. The Dynamo released him at the end of the season and he joined the Atlanta Attack on January 10, 1990. In 1991, Suri signed with the expansion Atlanta Magic of the USISL. In 1994, the Magic began playing outdoors in addition to its indoor seasons. In 1995, he played for the Chattanooga Express. He returned to the Magic in the fall of 1995 as a player-coach. In 1996, he played for the Atlanta Ruckus in the A-League. He retired at the end of the season.
