= David Moxom =

American soccer player (born 1972)

Personal information
- Date of birth: May 15, 1972 (age 54)
- Place of birth: Cleveland, Ohio, U.S.
- Height: 6 ft 1 in (1.85 m)
- Positions: Midfielder; defender

College career
Years	Team	Apps	(Gls)
1991–1994	Robert Morris University		

Senior career*
Years	Team	Apps	(Gls)
1995	Pittsburgh Stingers (indoor)	28	(9)
1996	Carolina Dynamo	20	(0)
1996–2001	Milwaukee Wave (indoor)	128	(18)
1997	Tampa Bay Mutiny	0	(0)
1997	→ Milwaukee Rampage (loan)	12	(0)
1997	→ Jacksonville Cyclones (loan)	1	(0)
Total		189	(27)
- * Club domestic league appearances and goals

David Moxom (born May 15, 1972) is an American retired soccer player who spent most of his career in the U.S. indoor leagues. However, he was also a member of the Milwaukee Rampage’s 1997 championship team.

== Youth ==
Born in Ohio, Moxom grew up in Pittsburgh, Pennsylvania, where he played for the Pittsburgh Beadling. He graduated from Baldwin High School in 1990. He then attended Robert Morris University, playing soccer from 1991 to 1994. He graduated with a bachelor's degree in communications. He later earned an MBA in finance from the University of Wisconsin-Milwaukee.

== Professional ==
In 1995, he signed with the Pittsburgh Stingers of the Continental Indoor Soccer League. In March 1996, the Kansas City Wiz selected Moxom in the second round (fifteenth overall) of the 1996 MLS Supplemental Draft. The Wiz released him on April 16, 1996. He then spent the 1996 season with the Carolina Dynamo of the USISL 20 (0) In the fall of 1996, Moxom signed with the Milwaukee Wave of the National Professional Soccer League. In March 1997, the Tampa Bay Mutiny selected Moxom in the first round (tenth overall) of the 1997 MLS Supplemental Draft. He never played for the Mutiny, but went on loan in the summer from the Wave to the Milwaukee Rampage of the USISL A-League, winning the league title that season. He also played one game on loan to the Jacksonville Cyclones for one game in June 1997. The Mutiny waived Moxom on April 1, 1998. He returned to the Wave in the fall of 1997. That season, Moxom and his teammates won the NPSL championship. He was forced to miss much of the 1998–1999 season after becoming ill with chronic ulcerative colitis (bleeding ulcer) during a trip to Brazil with the U.S. national futsal team. He made a comeback in 1999, playing two more seasons with the Wave, winning another two league championships. In January 2000, he joined Team USA.

== See also ==
- List of people diagnosed with ulcerative colitis
