= Casey Abrams (album) =

Studio album by Casey Abrams
- Released: June 26, 2012
- Genre: Jazz-pop
- Label: Concord
- Producers: Ian Barter, John Burk, Toby Gad, Jamie Hartman, Randy Jackson, Steve Jordan, Iain Pirie, Andy Stochansky, Martin Terefe, Rune Westberg

Singles from Casey Abrams
- 1. "Get Out" Released: June 5, 2012; 2. "Simple Life" Released: June 5, 2012

Casey Abrams is the self-titled debut album of jazz-pop artist and American Idol season ten sixth-place finalist Casey Abrams. It was released through the jazz label Concord Records on June 26, 2012, one year after Abrams competed on the Fox reality television series. The record deal was struck with the help of American Idol judge Randy Jackson, who serves as an executive producer on this album. Abrams spent six weeks recording the songs at Kensaltown Studios in London. He described this as an unusual experience, in which he often sang while sitting on a couch and recorded in an open room. Ambient noises from the city can be heard in the background of some tracks.

Abrams served as a co-writer on nine of the album's eleven tracks and, for the most part, felt that his creative vision was communicated. The album carries an upbeat tone. It predominately focuses on themes of nature and romantic yearning. Humorous subject matter is dealt with as well, such as in the songs "Wore Out My Soul", which is a double entendre about shoes, and "Stuck in London", which contains nonsense lyrics. Although Abrams had been known for jazz on American Idol, he went in a pop direction for this album, combining the two genres. "Dry Spell" has been considered the most jazz-influenced original song. However, a cover of the Ray Charles standard "Hit the Road Jack" is included as well and features a duet with fellow American Idol season 10 contestant Haley Reinhart. A deluxe version of the album, which includes covers of "Eleanor Rigby" and "Have You Ever Seen the Rain?", received a limited release.

Touring for the album was not extensive. However, Abrams opened a jazz festival on Penang Island, and after being dropped by Concord Records, he toured across Ethiopia. "Simple Life" and "Get Out" were released as dual singles a few weeks ahead of the album. Music videos were created for the two songs, as well as for non-singles "Stuck in London" and "Great Bright Morning". Jack Black, who had previously performed with Abrams on the American Idol season finale, appeared in a promotional comedy video that depicted Abrams as a homeless street busker.

Some critics were disappointed that Abrams did not make a more traditional jazz album. However, critical reception was positive overall. Some reviews compared Abrams to Jason Mraz, while others singled out the two jazziest songs, "Dry Spell and "Hit the Road Jack", as highlights. "Midnight Girl" also received high praise. It was listed as one 2012's best songs by an American Idol alumni. The album charted at No. 101 on the Billboard 200. It peaked at the No. 1 spot on Billboard's Top Heatseekers chart, while the single "Get Out" peaked at No. 23 on the Adult Contemporary chart and No. 39 on the Adult Pop Songs chart.

== Background ==
Unlike several of the other finalists from the tenth season of American Idol, Abrams did not gain a record deal in the immediate aftermath of the series. This caused Kate Ward to write an article for Entertainment Weekly, in which she called Abrams the "most musically talented contestant" from that season and suggested a petition to get him signed. In January 2012, it was reported that Abrams had signed with Concord Records, the jazz label that Esperanza Spalding - one of Abrams' musical inspirations - is a part of. When asked earlier what kind of album he would like to make, Abrams answered "between rock and jazz and everything in between."

Although he finished in sixth place, Abrams has said that he is glad he did not win American Idol. The tight schedule for releasing an album that is imposed on the winner would have placed more pressure on him than he would have liked. Instead, Abrams was able to spend as much time as he felt necessary to find "the right label and the right music". "I need a chill vibe", he said explaining his feelings on the matter. The album was released on June 26, 2012, about a year after Abrams' participation on American Idol, and about ten months later than season ten winner Scotty McCreery's debut album. As soon as the American Idol Summer tour finished, Abrams went to Los Angeles, where he began writing sessions.

== Writing and recording ==
All of the songs were co-written by Abrams, except for "A Boy Can Dream" and "Hit the Road Jack". Although he had written songs on his own before, this marked the first time that Abrams had ever co-written with someone. Only new song ideas were used for the album. Abrams valued the "collaborative process" of working with other writers and feels that this is crucial to making music "fun". The album mixes elements of jazz and pop - Abrams has said that he "learned how pop music works" from his co-writers. Describing the album's genre as "organic focal", he placed heavy emphasis on melodies and harmonies - the "focal point" - while relying primarily on organic instruments, such as acoustic guitar, upright piano, and double bass. Commenting in particular on the double bass (or upright bass), which he gained notice for using during his run on American Idol, Abrams said that he feels the instrument "adds depth, changing frequencies you wouldn't hear on an electric bass." One of the takeaways that Abrams hoped fans would get from this album is his ability to play more instruments than just those that he used on TV. In addition to the double bass, Abrams played the cello, the drums, the acoustic guitar, the melodica, the recorder, the shaker, and a wurlitzer on the album. He gave serious consideration to being the only instrumentalist, but concluded that the album would be stronger with "input from different artists".

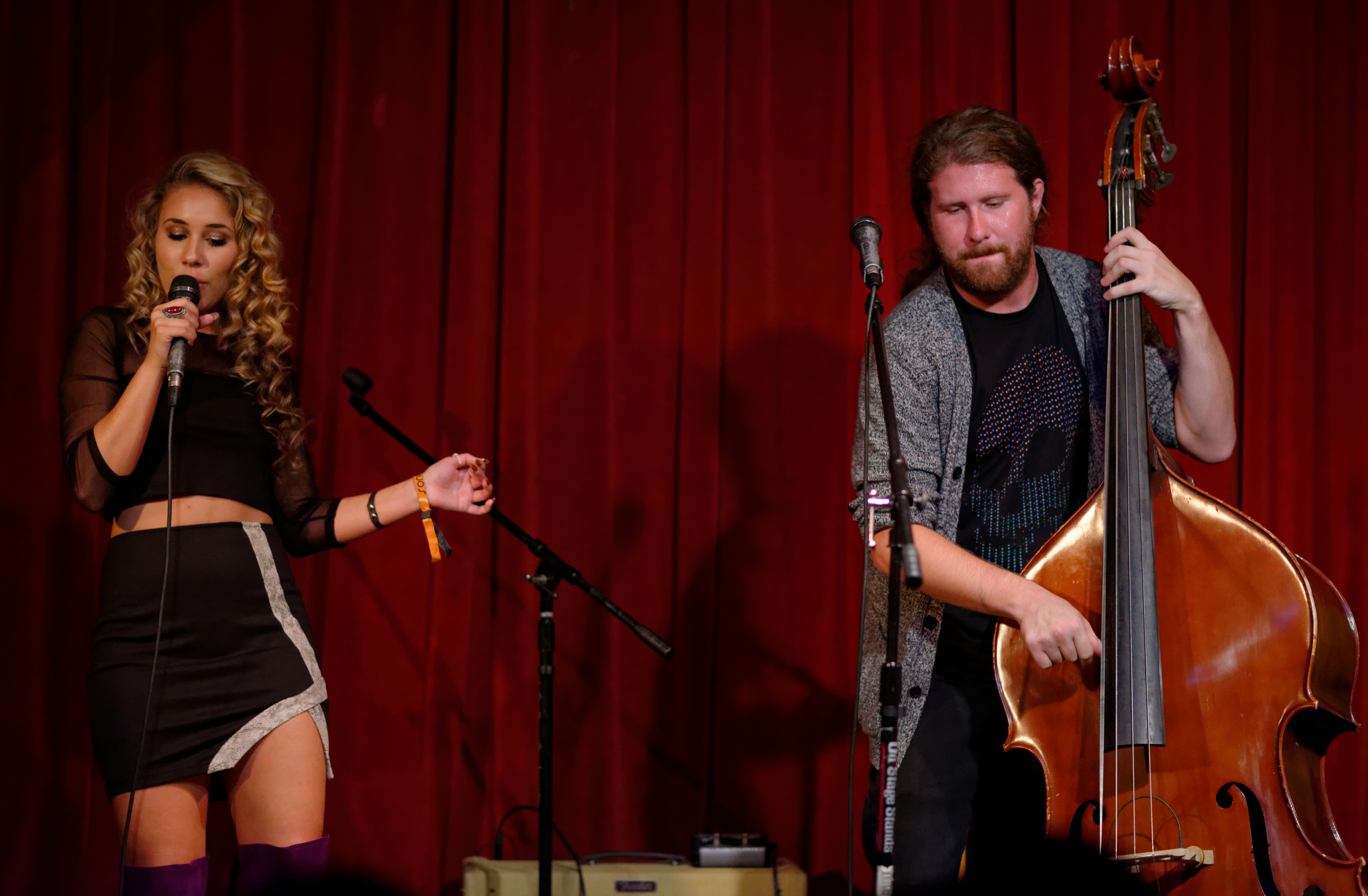
American Idol season ten third-place finalist Haley Reinhart (left) dueted with Abrams (right) on the Ray Charles standard "Hit the Road Jack".

American Idol judge and fellow upright bass player Randy Jackson served as an executive producer on the album. He suggested the possibility of collaborating, shortly after Abrams' run on the series. Although Abrams had little direct involvement with Jackson on the album, Jackson made several important connections for Abrams. Jackson is the one who connected Abrams with Concord Records.

Before recording the album, Abrams had mentioned an interest in working with Ellen DeGeneres, who judged American Idol the year before he competed. Iain Pirie and Martin Terefe also served as executive producers on the album. Commenting on Terefe, who produced many of Jason Mraz's albums, Abrams said, "I think he’s probably the nicest, but weirdest guy I've ever met...If something’s not working, he'll let you down very easily and if something's good, he’ll be your biggest cheerleader".

The tone of the album is intended to be happy and upbeat. Abrams wanted to "put out good vibes" with the music, explaining that he hoped to help people "feel good about the world". The album progresses into somewhat more negative subject matter as it goes on though. "We all thought it would be funny if we started the album off really happy and then got to the negative content", Abrams said. Opening track "Simple Life" was a collaboration with Toby Gad. A bass line that Gad played on the piano reminded Abrams of relaxing in his hammock and "looking up at the sky." The song developed from a discussion that the two had about "how nice" it is to take a break from technology every now and then and just go outside to enjoy nature. One time when Abrams wanted to do this, he was at a friend's house, in an area that he was unfamiliar with. Despite his desire to "go play guitar behind the house and be in nature", he was wary of the location. Reminding himself that he was now an adult, he "tuned [his] guitar down to a dropped D" and told himself, "I'm not scared of ghosts no more." From this emerged the song "Ghosts", which he took to Rune Westberg for further development. An additional element was then added, to make the song about staying the same in a relationship even when other aspects of your life are changing. "Great Bright Morning", which Abrams described as "a friendship song", was written with Andy Stochansky and Jamie Hartman. The song continues the theme of exploring nature and is about Abrams' dog, Rocky. "He's got a stub instead of a tail", explained Abrams. "I think [that] is probably the coolest part...[it] is so funny because whenever someone comes home, if I come home or my mom or dad walks in, he gets really excited and starts shaking his little stub." Abrams has had Rocky since the fifth grade and adopted him out of a bundle. He pictured the two of them "walking through the hills of Idyllwild" for the song - his hometown, where he has called the hills "magical", and of which he said, "You can watch a sunset [there], and the only other person to enjoy it with you is your dog."

"To be honest, I've probably eaten mangos three times in my life, but 'eating mangos in a mango tree' is fun to say".

— Casey Abrams on one of the lyrics to "Stuck in London"

Another location that had influence on the album was London. Abrams recorded all of the songs in that city, at Kensaltown Studios. He found this to be a unique experience, as the room was "totally open" and had windows. The mixer was not in a separate room - he could hear all of the music. Most of Abrams' vocals were recorded while sitting on a couch. Since Abrams played live, sounds of the city, such as buses, clock towers, and birds, made it onto the recordings and can be heard on the finished album. " I think recording anywhere else other than LA has different kinds of vibes", Abrams said about the experience. He felt that recording in London "captured the wonder" and the "wanderlust" that he felt about the city. An initial two week stay extended into six, and during this time, Abrams wrote two songs - one of these is "Stuck in London". While walking around the city, Abrams began forming a melody for the song. After playing his ideas for Terefe, he was advised to "reverse the chords of the chorus". Joined by co-writer Sacha Skarbek, the trio then took the song in a "party jazzy" direction. "I loved it. He just went along with my madness and made it into the Caribbean dance party fun track", Abrams said. Wanting to use evocative imagery in the song, Abrams came up with "fun" lyrics that held little bearing on his actual life.

Ian Barter came to Abrams with a fully formed melody for a song, which Abrams then improvised lyrics over. While joking around, Barter suggested making the whole thing into a veiled love song about shoes, to which Abrams responded, "That's hilarious, let's do it." The song is called "Wore Out My Soul". Abrams has called Barter a "genius" and was happy to write about an unconventional topic. "I feel like there's no subject that can't be sung about...every rock should be turned", he said. "Blame It On Me", which was co-written with Aron Friedman and Pamela Sheyne, allowed Abrams to "[play] a character". Abrams called this song the least like him on the record, remarking that he would "never really say" the lyrics another person. The song focuses on a woman who is trying to come up with an excuse for leaving in the middle of a date, even as the man knows that she is just intimidated by his sexiness. Abrams has joked that the album is "mostly about wanting girls to like" him.

"Get Out" is Abrams' "heartbreak song", that he described as having "a very simple 'I hate you, but I love you' kind of vibe". Written on the guitar and then recorded with "pop instruments", it was a collaboration with Westberg and Jason Reeves. "Midnight Girl" is a very personal song for Abrams. Drawing inspiration for it from a real life relationship that none of his friends were able to understand, Abrams wanted to make the point that when two people are in a loving relationship, they should not be discouraged by how others view them. The song was co-written with Stochansky and Hartman.

"A Boy Can Dream" was written by busbee, Tommy Lee James, and Zac Maloy, without any initial input from Abrams. The song reminded Abrams of a time when he had met a girl at a wedding on New Year's Eve and had felt something special between the two of them. He described the relationship as having been "kind of cinematic". When Abrams saw the song, he said that it was "eerie" how close the lyrics matched his own experience. He changed a few of the lyrics though, to make them fit him even better. The song tells of a short-lived relationship that lingers in a boy's memory, as he wonders what might have happened had it not ended. Longing gives way to desperation on the album's penultimate track, "Dry Spell". Abrams said that it is "probably the jazziest [song] on the album" and that it tells the story of a man who is a "mess" and needs to "let loose". He particularly enjoyed writing this one (with Friedman and Sheyne), and described "laying down the base track" for it as "awesome". Jamie Cullum plays the piano on this track and was characterized by Abrams as "a crazy cool piano player that just has the bebop in his soul."

Soon after the album's release, Abrams commented that he already had ideas for "several" new albums "brewing". At least one of these he hoped would be more in line with traditional jazz and would include jazz covers. One Ray Charles standard did make it onto this album - "Hit the Road Jack", which Abrams performed as a duet with fellow American Idol season ten finalist Haley Reinhart. Abrams and Reinhart had previously recorded a cover of "Baby, It's Cold Outside" together. The two are close friends, and when asked, Abrams said that he "wouldn't be opposed" to recording an entire album with her. The track's producer Steve Jordan suggested that they do a "funky" version of "Hit the Road Jack", after Abrams mentioned his desire to cover a Ray Charles song. They sought to give the song an "urban twist" - something which Abrams described as "a big risk". Initially, Abrams was going to record the song without Reinhart. However, he and Jordan decided to try recording the song as a duet, so as to better evoke the Ray Charles original. Abrams remarked that he "pulled [Reinhart] into the recording session to see what would happen, and it was magic."

"They kind of let me do my thing. They saw what I did on the show. They knew that I wouldn't take no shit from no one."

— Casey Abrams

Abrams has said that he got to do "a lot of things" he "wanted to do" on the album, and he has expressed enthusiasm over the songs, saying "I'll sing every single one 'til the day I die." However, he has also hinted that conflict may have occurred during the process of making the album - some parties were concerned that none of the songs would be viable as a single. "I did have to fight for a couple things", Abrams said. Reflecting on the situation a few years later, Abrams felt that certain individuals placed their financial goals for the album above artistic merit. Overall though, Abrams had a good experience with the label and found that people were open to his vision.

Abrams' favorite songs on the album are "Stuck in London" and "Midnight Girl". He likes "Stuck in London", because it has "kind of an odd meter" and "different time signatures", and he has described "Midnight Girl" as a "very sweet" song that can be played "with just an acoustic guitar or with a full band." As a whole, he considers the album to be a "trial record", unfocused in its genre, but still "pretty good". He toyed with the idea of recording a second album under an alias, on which he would have done "straight jazz versions" of all the songs on this album.

== Singles ==
"Simple Life" and "Get Out" were both released as singles on June 5, 2012. They were sold together on iTunes. "Simple Life" was also offered on its own as a free download from Tumblr. "Get Out" spent thirteen weeks on Billboard's Adult Contemporary chart, peaking at No. 23, and four weeks on the Adult Pop Songs chart, peaking at No. 39.

A music video for "Simple Life" was released in September 2012. It features Abrams enjoying the outdoors with hippies and was called "adorably Abrams-esque" by Lyndsey Parker of Yahoo! Music. A music video for "Get Out" was then released in February 2013, featuring multiple versions of Abrams, each playing one of the tracks instruments in a subway busking band. It was called a "hoot" by Michele Amabile Angermiller of The Hollywood Reporter and was named the second best 2013 music video for an American Idol alumni by Mark Franklin of The York Dispatch.

== Promotion ==
To promote the release of the music video for "Get Out", Abrams released a short comedy video to YouTube, which featured cameos from Jack Black (who performed with Abrams on the American Idol season 10 finale), fellow American Idol season 10 alumni Haley Reinhart (who performs "Hit the Road Jack" with Abrams on this album) and Paul McDonald, as well as season 6 runner-up Blake Lewis. Leading up to the release of the video, Abrams managed to pique public curiosity in his affairs by asking several of his friends from American Idol to launch a Twitter hashtag called #wherescasey. Those who participated (which included season 10 winner Scotty McCreery) pretended to be worried about Abrams, and the story was even reported upon by TMZ. The video depicts Abrams as a homeless busker and was envisioned as tie-in with the "Get Out" music video (which depicts Abrams in a similar condition). Although the scenario is purely fictional, Abrams really did walk down Hollywood Boulevard in his bare feet, while carrying a "giant stuffed gorilla" (which is also featured in the video) as a publicity stunt. A TMZ tour bus noticed him while he was doing this, and when it decided to stop, Abrams performed a song and danced.

Although "Stuck in London" and "Great Bright Morning" were never made into singles, music videos for the songs were released in October 2013 and February 2015 respectively. They both feature Abrams and a group of friends singing by a campfire in Abrams' own backyard. The video for "Stuck in London" features Jackie Tohn (who competed on the eighth season of American Idol), while the video for "Great Bright Morning" features Lewis, Elliott Yamin (who competed on the fifth season of American Idol), Dani Knight (who competed on The X Factor) and actress Alyson Stoner. Both videos feature Reinhart as well.

In March 2013, Abrams returned to the American Idol stage to perform a cover of "I Saw Her Standing There" by The Beatles. Although he has never recorded this song, the promotional appearance led to sales of his album rising about 2,000% over the previous week. Abrams said that appearing on the show again was nerve-racking and that he was "star-struck" by that season's new judges, Nicki Minaj, Mariah Carey, and Keith Urban.

A deluxe version of the album was released in Walmart stores. It contains two bonus tracks - covers of "Eleanor Rigby" and "Have You Ever Seen the Rain?". During the same week as the album's release, an extra original song, called "Chip on Your Shoulder", was made available as an online music video. The song is about Abrams' struggles with inflammatory bowel disease and was available exclusively at IBDIcons.com, the website for a national campaign dedicated to raising awareness of the disease. For every one of Abrams' fans who registered at the website to view the music video, a donation of one dollar was made to Crohn's & Colitis Foundation of America.

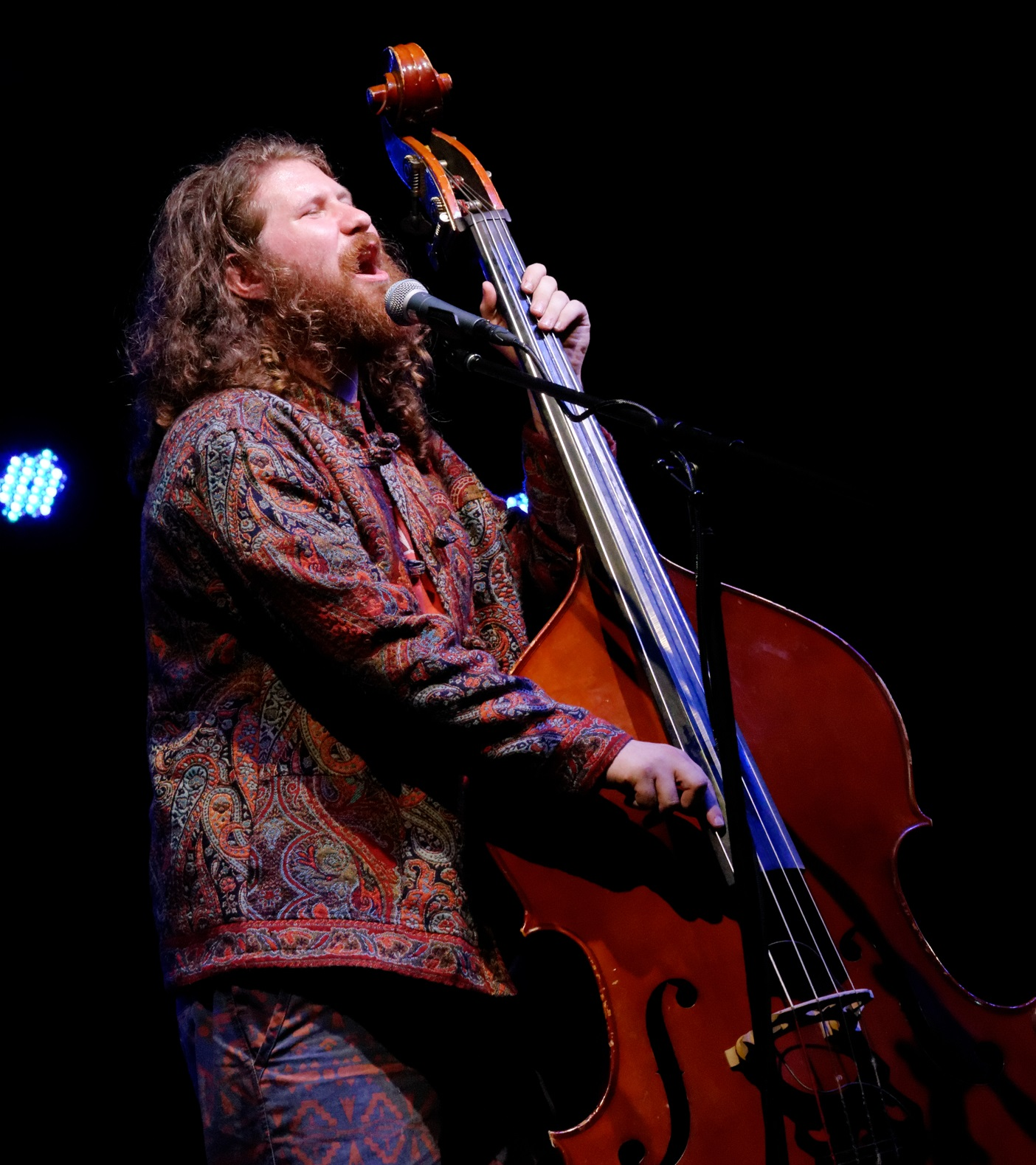
Abrams performing at a concert in 2013

== Touring ==
Upon the album's release, Abrams described his touring plans as being simple and low-key. "I might go around the country in my car. Bring a bass, a guitar, an accordion and see what happens. I'm not too sure", he said. On December 5, 2013, he opened the 10th Penang Island Jazz Festival. Jason Cheah of Malaysian newspaper The Star, wrote that ahead of the concert, some people questioned whether Abrams had strong enough jazz credentials to be a proper fit. However Cheah was greatly impressed by Abrams and praised the artist's depth of musical knowledge. He called the concert "arguably one of the best small hall gigs" in that area of the entire year. The Hollywood Reporter wrote in February 2014 that Abrams had recently toured Ethiopia upon the invitation of a friend from the charity organization Ethiopia Skate. Abrams had just been dropped by Concord Records around this time and traveled to the country extemporaneously. "I basically went there, having nothing but a will to play some music", he said. Abrams played at several jazz festivals in the country, as well as at "random night clubs". He has said that he met and occasionally played with some of the preeminent Ethiopian jazz artists during this trip.

== Reception ==
=== Critical reception ===
The album was well received by critics. Sherry Lipp of the Seattle Post-Intelligencer called it more contemporary than one would have expected from Abrams and felt that this kept it from being a traditional jazz album. However, she considered the pop elements to be "well-crafted". "Dry Spell" was singled out in her review as the most jazz-influenced original song on the album. Lipp wrote that this track did an excellent job of showcasing Abrams' skills on the double bass. She appreciated its "jazzy piano solo" and "complex drum rhythms" as well. Jim Farber of the New York Daily News agreed with Lipp that "Dry Spell" is one of the album's highlights. He noted that Jamie Cullum, who plays piano on the track, is a good match with Abrams, declaring that the two are "equally impish". In Farber's opinion the "jazzier songs [like "Dry Spell"] have more individuality than the pop ones".

[I]t's all a bit too sweet and dippy but it's hard to get mad at the amiable Abrams. It'd be like getting angry at a puppy that only wants to get pets.

— Stephen Thomas Erlewine of AllMusic

Lipp found Abrams' cover of "Hit the Road Jack" to be "more relaxed" and "slowed-down" than the original "with a more prominent bass line." She praised Reinhart's performance, writing that the guest artist proves her "jazz-blues chops". Mark Franklin of The York Dispatch called the duet "great".

The tone of the album was found to be light and casual. "There's not a lot of soul searching" wrote Lipp. Farber found the performances to be lacking in "depth" and "sex", although he determined that Abrams "makes up for [this] in charm." He thought that Abrams, with his "high, boyish pitch", comes across as an innocent. "While many songs mean to communicate romantic pining, Abrams' delivery has such ease and sweetness, it erases any sadness. He sings entirely in winks and blushes, playing the bashful best friend who never gets the girl but always gets the joke", Farber wrote. In a three out of four star review for AllMusic, Stephen Thomas Erlewine noted that Abrams carries a bright disposition throughout the album by mostly avoiding sad subject matter. "It's all love songs and paeans to the wonders of a simple life, whether it's embracing a "Great Bright Morning" or eating mangos in a mango tree", wrote Erlewine. Franklin was enamored with the album's approach, writing that it "goes down as easy as a sunny, 85-degree summer day." Commenting on whether Abrams lived up to his American Idol hype, Franklin wrote, "Mission accomplished in a mellow, just-having-fun sorta way."

Opinions differed though, on how well Abrams managed his transition from television performer to recording artist. Lipp lamented that his "ferociousness and quirkiness" do not come off as strongly on the album as she would have liked, but recognized that "what works on the Idol stage does not always translate into real world record sales." Erlewine remarked that the very qualities that had made Abrams stand out on the series prove to be "grating, but only mildly so" over the course of an entire album. He pointed to "all the good cheer, the jazzy runs and scats, [and] the way [Abrams] leans just a little too hard into his phrases whenever he wants to seem soulful" as examples. However, Farber thought that Abrams succeeded in carrying over his appeal. He wrote, "[Abrams]' vocals sound less fettered and more fluid than ever — enough to make even his busiest scats seem not skittish but pretty. It's a style as supple in tone as it is agile in cadence."

Both Farber and Erlewine compared the musical style to that of Jason Mraz, although Erlewine ultimately felt that the album comes across as "a wannabe throwback to the '70s." Farber heard similarities to Bobby McFerrin, writing that "Simple Life" could be "the long lost son" of McFerrin's song "Don't Worry, Be Happy".

My biggest complaint is that the album ends too soon at just 11 tracks. It spent just one week on the Billboard 200, so lots of you might have missed it. Shame. You’re missing out.

— Mark Franklin of Idol Chatter (The York Dispatch)

Lipp praised Abrams' abilities as a musician and a songwriter. In addition to her jazzy favorites, "Dry Spell" and "Hit the Road Jack", she pointed to "Blame It On Me" and "Great Bright Morning" as the album's best tracks. Worrying that some might overlook "Great Bright Morning" because of its subtlety, she praised it as "heartfelt" and noted that its "warm acoustic work make[s] it worth going back to." "Blame It On Me" was called the "funkiest thing here" by Erlewine, and Lipp wrote that the song's "steady-rocking, propulsive pop" is a good fit for Abrams' style of singing. While opining that none of the songs are genuinely bad, she nonetheless pointed to "Midnight Girl", "A Boy Can Dream", and "Get Out" as the three weakest, calling the former two unmemorable and likening the latter to a Justin Bieber pop song. Franklin praised "Get Out" as a highlight however, and named "Midnight Girl" as the album's best non-single, writing that it "grew on [him] with repeated listens." He also named "Midnight Girl" as the tenth best 2012 song by an American Idol alumni, while naming the album as a whole the fourth best for 2012 by an alumnus of the show.

=== Sales and chart performance ===
The album sold around 4,000 copies in its first week, debuting at No. 101 on the Billboard 200. It spent eight weeks on Billboard's Top Heatseekers chart and peaked in the No. 1 spot.

Following Abrams' March 2013 American Idol promotional performance, the album had sold 27,000 copies in total.

== Track listing ==
No.	Title	Writer(s)	Length
1.	"Simple Life"	Casey Abrams, Toby Gad	3:36
2.	"Ghosts"	Abrams, Rune Westberg	3:37
3.	"Get Out"	Abrams, Jason Reeves, Westberg	3:31
4.	"Great Bright Morning"	Abrams, Jamie Hartman, Andy Stochansky	3:38
5.	"Blame It on Me"	Abrams, Aron Friedman, Pamela Sheyne	3:33
6.	"Wore Out My Soul"	Abrams, Ian Barter	4:31
7.	"Stuck in London"	Abrams, Sacha Skarbek, Martin Terefe	2:45
8.	"Midnight Girl"	Abrams, Hartman, Stochansky	3:07
9.	"A Boy Can Dream"	Busbee, Tommy Lee James, Zac Maloy	3:17
10.	"Dry Spell"	Abrams, Friedman, Sheyne	3:14
11.	"Hit the Road Jack" (feat. Haley Reinhart)	Percy Mayfield	3:46

== Personnel ==
Credits adapted from AllMusic.

- Casey Abrams - vocals, bass, electric bass, cello, double bass, drums, guitar, melodica, recorder, shaker, wurlitzer

Additional vocals

- Haley Reinhart - vocals
- Karl Brazil - background vocals
- Lucille Findlay - background vocals
- Shaneeka Simon - background vocals
- Martin Terefe - background vocals
- Nikolaj Torp - background vocals

Additional musicians

- Ian Barter - flute, guitar, keyboards,
- Karl Brazil - drums, percussion
- Jamie Cullum - piano
- Alex Eichenburher - cello
- Larry Goldings - Hammond B3, wurlitzer
- Jamie Hartman - bass, percussion
- Steve Jordan - drums
- Sam Keyte - handclapping
- Dean Parks - guitar
- Luke Potashnik - guitar
- Sacha Skarbek - Fender Rhodes
- Kristoffer Sonne - drums
- Andy Stochansky - drums, guitar, percussion
- Martin Terefe - banjo, bass, guitar, percussion
- Nikolaj Torp - Fender Rhodes, organ, piano, synthesizer bass
- Ian Wilson - violin

Technical personnel

- Ian Barter - engineering, production
- Niko Bolas - engineering
- John Burk - executive production, vocal production
- Marten Cardona - mixing assistance
- Adam Cole - engineering
- Lorenzo Cosi - engineering
- Toby Gad - engineering, production
- Dyre Gormsen - engineering
- Jamie Hartman - engineering, production
- Justin Hergett - mixing assistance
- Randy Jackson - executive production
- Steve Jordan - production
- Thomas Juth - mixing
- Sam Keyte - engineering
- James Krauss - mixing assistance
- Dave Kutch - mastering
- Tony Maserati - mixing
- Vanessa Parr - engineering assistance
- Iain Pirie - executive production
- Seth Presant - engineering
- Jon Rezin - vocal editing
- Andy Stochansky - engineering, production
- Chris Tabron - mixing assistance
- Martin Terefe - production
- Rune Westberg - engineering, production

Misc.

- Larissa Collins - art direction
- Sam Keyte - assistance
- Kassondra Monroe - package design
- Yvette Roman - photography
- Rune Westberg - instrumentation
