= List of people diagnosed with ulcerative colitis =

List of people with ulcerative colitis

The following is a list of notable people diagnosed with ulcerative colitis.

Name	Notability	Reference
Shinzō Abe	Prime Minister of Japan (2006–2007 and 2012–2020)	
Casey Abrams	American musician	
Sunny Anderson	TV and radio show personality, food caterer	
Trevor Bauer	American baseball pitcher	
Rolf Benirschke	American football player	
Amy Brenneman	American actress	
Henryk Broder	Polish born German author and TV personality	
Marvin P. Bush	Son of George H. W. Bush	
Rashad Butler	American football player	
Apsley Cherry-Garrard	British polar explorer	
Shayne Corson	Canadian hockey player	
Jake Diekman	American baseball pitcher	
Sertab Erener	Turkish singer	
Jack Fitzwater	English footballer	
Darren Fletcher	Scottish footballer	
Chris Gedney	American former NFL player	
Brian Austin Green	American Actor	
Hank Green	American YouTuber and entrepreneur	
Käärijä	Finnish rapper, pop star	
Gregory Itzin	American film and television actor	
Adam Lallana	English football player and coach	
Stewart Lee	English comedian	
Chuck Lorre	American television writer, director, producer and composer	
Erin Martin	American pop singer	
Russell Martin	English born Scottish football player and manager	
Michael Mauti	American football player, linebacker	
Josh Mierkalns	English cricketer	
Lewis Moody	English rugby union player	
David Moxom	American soccer player	
Chie Nakamura	Japanese voice actress	
Siobhan-Marie O'Connor	English competitive swimmer	
J. Robert Oppenheimer	American theoretical physicist	
Johnny Pemberton	American actor	
Adam Pettyjohn	American baseball player	
Fernando Pisani	Canadian hockey player	
Cody Ramsey	Australian Rugby League player	
Steve Redgrave	British rower	
Dan Reynolds	American musician	
Jerry Sadowitz	Scottish stand-up comic and magician	
Josh Sims	English footballer	
Heath Slocum	American golfer	
Luke Smallbone	Australian-American singer/songwriter	
Tony Snow	American journalist, former White House press secretary	
Jason Somerville	American professional poker player	
Scott Speed	American race car driver	
Georges St-Pierre	Canadian mixed martial artist	
Paul Stewart	Scottish race car driver	
Aaron Swartz	American computer programmer and activist	
Jordan Sweeney	American musician	
Dajuan Wagner	American basketball player	
William Wilberforce	English politician	
Ray Wilkins	English footballer	
Erik Wolpaw	American video game writer	
Hannah Witton	British YouTube personality	
John J. York	American Actor	

== Bibliography ==
- Pollock, John (1977), Wilberforce, New York: St. Martin's Press, ISBN 978-0-09-460780-4, OCLC 3738175
- Hague, William (2007), William Wilberforce: The Life of the Great Anti-Slave Trade Campaigner, London: HarperPress, ISBN 978-0-00-722885-0, OCLC 80331607
