= Peter Notaro =

American soccer player

Personal information
- Date of birth: January 1, 1957 (age 69)
- Place of birth: Baltimore, Maryland, U.S.
- Position: Forward

Youth career
- 1975–1978: Loyola Greyhounds

Senior career*
Years	Team	Apps	(Gls)
1979	Chicago Sting		
1979–1980	Cleveland Force (indoor)	8	(0)
- * Club domestic league appearances and goals

Peter Notaro (born July 5, 1956) is an American retired soccer forward who played in the North American Soccer League and Major Indoor Soccer League.

Notaro graduated from Calvert Hall College High School, then attended Loyola University Maryland where he played soccer from 1975 to 1978. He holds the school's career goals record with 81 and was a 1977 Honorable Mention (third team) and 1978 First Team All American soccer player. In 1979, he signed with the Chicago Sting of the North American Soccer League. In the fall of 1979, he moved to the Cleveland Force of the Major Indoor Soccer League. He was inducted into the Maryland Soccer Hall of Fame in 1998.
