= Stan Koziol =

American soccer player

Personal information
- Full name: Joseph Stanley Koziol
- Date of birth: July 29, 1965
- Place of birth: Clifton, New Jersey, U.S.
- Date of death: March 3, 2014 (aged 48)
- Position: Midfielder

Youth career
- 1983–1987: Loyola Greyhounds

Senior career*
Years	Team	Apps	(Gls)
1988	Maryland Bays		
1989–1990	Boston Bolts		
1989–1990	Baltimore Blast (indoor)	10	(2)
1990–1991	Hershey Impact (indoor)		
1992–1993	Canton Invaders (indoor)	5	(1)
1996	Central Jersey Riptide		

International career
1992	Puerto Rico	4	(0)
- * Club domestic league appearances and goals

Joseph Stanley Koziol (July 29, 1965 – March 3, 2014) was an American soccer midfielder who played professionally in the Major Indoor Soccer League, National Professional Soccer League and American Professional Soccer League. He also competed with the Puerto Rico national football team in 1992.

== Career ==
=== Youth ===
Koziol, the older brother of Joe Koziol, attended Loyola University Maryland, playing on the men's soccer team from 1983 to 1987. He holds the school's career assists record and was a 1986 and 1987 Second Team All American. In 1994, Koziol was inducted into the Loyola Hall of Fame.

=== Professional ===
In 1988, Koziol began his professional career with the Maryland Bays of the American Soccer League. In 1989, he moved to the Boston Bolts where he spent two seasons. In the 1989 season, the Bolts played in the American Professional Soccer League. In 1989, Koziol moved indoors with the Baltimore Blast of the Major Indoor Soccer League. On November 4, 1990, Koziol signed with the Hershey Impact of the National Professional Soccer League. He played for the Canton Invaders during the 1992-93 NPSL season.

In 1996, he played for the Central Jersey Riptide of the USISL Pro League. On July 17, 1996, the MetroStars called up Koziol for an exhibition with the Italian U-23 national team.

=== International ===
Koziol competed for the Puerto Rico national football team during Puerto Rico's qualification games for the 1994 FIFA World Cup.

== Personal life ==
He died on March 3, 2014, following a short battle with leukemia. at the age of 48.
