= Casey Abrams =

American musician (born 1991)

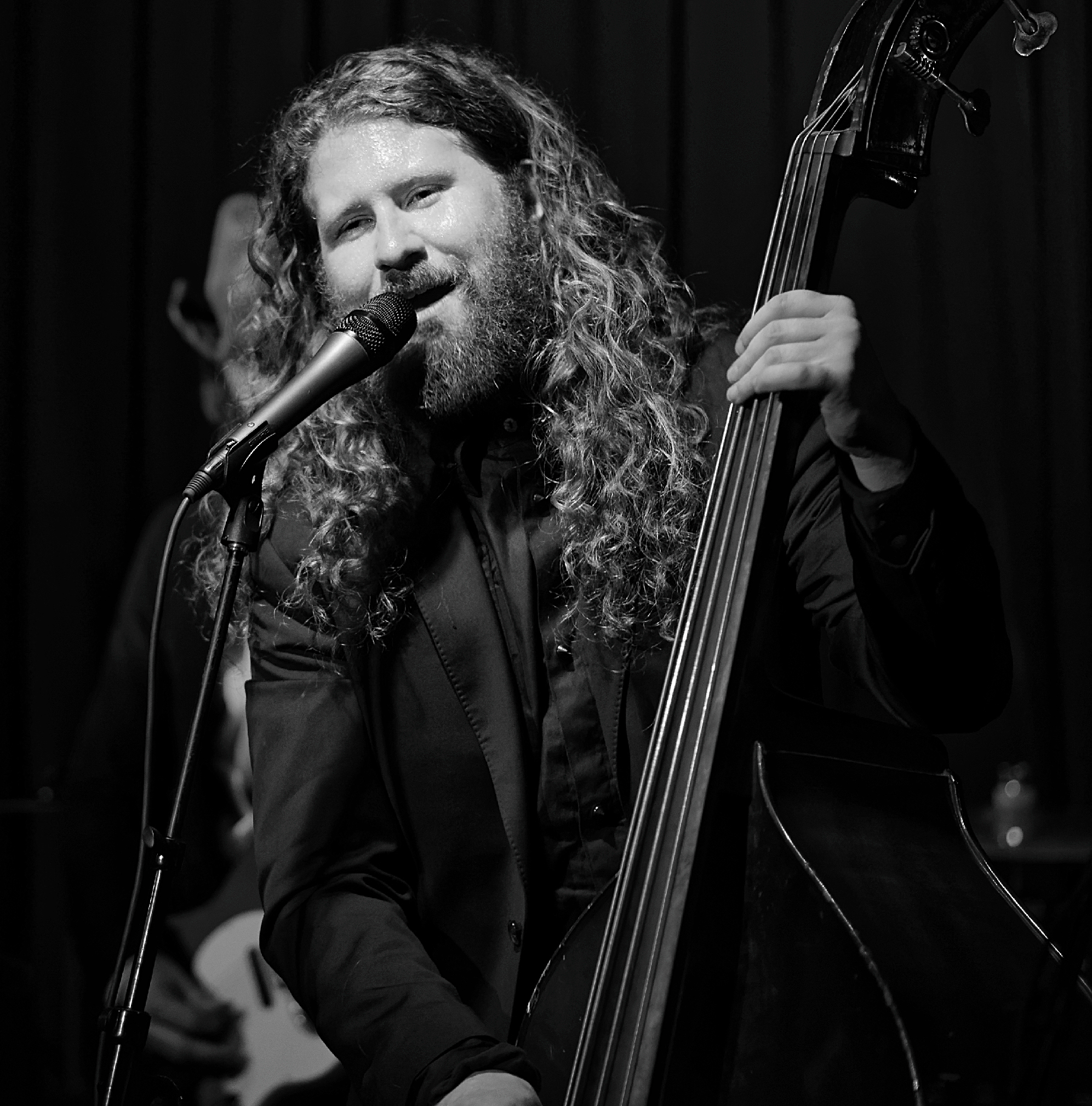
- Abrams performing in 2016

Background information
- Born: February 12, 1991 (age 35); Austin, Texas, U.S.
- Origin: Idyllwild, California
- Genres: Jazz; rock; blues
- Occupations: Musician; singer; songwriter
- Instruments: Vocals; double bass
- Years active: 2011–present
- Labels: 19; Concord; Chesky
- Website: caseybassy.com

Casey Abrams (born February 12, 1991) is an American musician from Idyllwild, California, who finished in sixth place in the tenth season of American Idol, five weeks after being saved from elimination by the judges. A self-titled debut album was released in 2012 through Concord Records. Tales from the Gingerbread House was released on January 29, 2016.

== Early life ==
Abrams was born on February 12, 1991, in Austin, Texas, to Pam Pierce and Ira Abrams. His father is Jewish and his mother is from a Catholic background, and Abrams grew up in an interfaith family. He spent his early years in the Chicago area, first in Evanston, Illinois, then in Wilmette, where he attended McKenzie Elementary School.

Abrams later moved to California and attended middle school and high school there. He was a student at Idyllwild Arts Academy in Idyllwild, California, where his father taught film production. At Idyllwild Arts, he studied classical bass instruction and improvisation, and participated in the jazz ensembles, gaining a foundation in music history, piano, and jazz piano, and learning to write musical scores for films.

After graduating from Idyllwild in 2009, he attended University of Colorado at Boulder as a music major. He worked as a film camp counselor at Idyllwild Arts Summer Camp before his appearance on American Idol.

Abrams has ulcerative colitis, an inflammatory disease which causes ulceration and inflammation of the colon, and that occasionally requires blood transfusions, which resulted in his having to be hospitalized while on American Idol.

Abrams lists as his musical influences Ray Charles, Frank Sinatra, Oscar Peterson, and James Taylor, as well as Marshall Hawkins, head of the jazz department at Idyllwild Arts Academy.

== American Idol ==
=== Overview ===
Abrams auditioned for the tenth season of American Idol in Austin, Texas. He was selected as one of the Top 24 semi-finalists, but two days before he was due to perform for the semi-finals, he suffered severe stomach pains and was rushed to the hospital. He was well enough to perform on performance night, and was one of the five male vote receivers to advance to the Top 13; however, he missed the Top 13 results show due to his illness. He was the lowest vote receiver on the Top 11 results show, but was saved by the judges; they chose to save him immediately, stopping his supposedly last performance on the show halfway through it. He is the third finalist to be saved by the judges in three seasons.

Abrams was eliminated from the competition on April 28, 2011, finishing in sixth place. During his last performance, he sang "I Put a Spell on You" by Screamin' Jay Hawkins, a song he had performed during the semi-finals. During the performance, he kissed audience members, rolled onto the stage, thanked the judges, and sang the last two words ("you're mine") to fellow contestant Haley Reinhart.

On May 25, 2011, Abrams sang "Fat Bottomed Girls" with Jack Black on the American Idol finale.

=== Performances and results ===
Episode	Theme	Song choice	Original artist	Order #	Result
Audition	Auditioner's Choice	"I Don't Need No Doctor"	Ray Charles	N/A	Advanced
Hollywood Round, Part 1	First Solo	"Lullaby of Birdland"	Ella Fitzgerald	N/A	Advanced
Hollywood Round, Part 2	Group Performance	"Get Ready"	The Temptations	N/A	Advanced
Hollywood Round, Part 3	Second Solo	"Georgia on My Mind"	Hoagy Carmichael	N/A	Advanced
Las Vegas Round	Songs of The Beatles; Group Performance	"A Hard Day's Night"	The Beatles	N/A	Advanced
Hollywood Round Final	Final Solo	"Why Don't You Do Right?"	Kansas Joe McCoy	N/A	Advanced
Top 24 (12 Men)	Personal Choice	"I Put a Spell on You"	Screamin' Jay Hawkins	12	Advanced
Top 13	Your Personal Idol	"With a Little Help from My Friends"	The Beatles	2	Safe
Top 12	Year You Were Born	"Smells Like Teen Spirit"	Nirvana	10	Safe
Top 11	Motown	"I Heard It Through the Grapevine"	The Miracles	1	Saved^{1}
Top 11^{2}	Elton John	"Your Song"	Elton John	9	Safe
Top 9	Rock & Roll Hall of Fame	"Have You Ever Seen the Rain?"	Creedence Clearwater Revival	3	Safe
Top 8	Songs from the Movies	"Nature Boy"	Nat King Cole	5	Safe
Top 7	Songs from the 21st Century	"Harder to Breathe"	Maroon 5	5	Safe
Top 6	Carole King	Duet "I Feel the Earth Move" with Haley Reinhart	Carole King	3	Eliminated
Top 6	Carole King	Solo "Hi-De-Ho"	The City	7	Eliminated

- ^Note 1 Abrams received the lowest number of votes; however, the judges decided to use their one save of the season to allow him to remain in the competition, resulting in two eliminations the following week.
- ^Note 2 Due to the judges using their one save on Abrams, the Top 11 remained intact for another week.

== Post-Idol ==
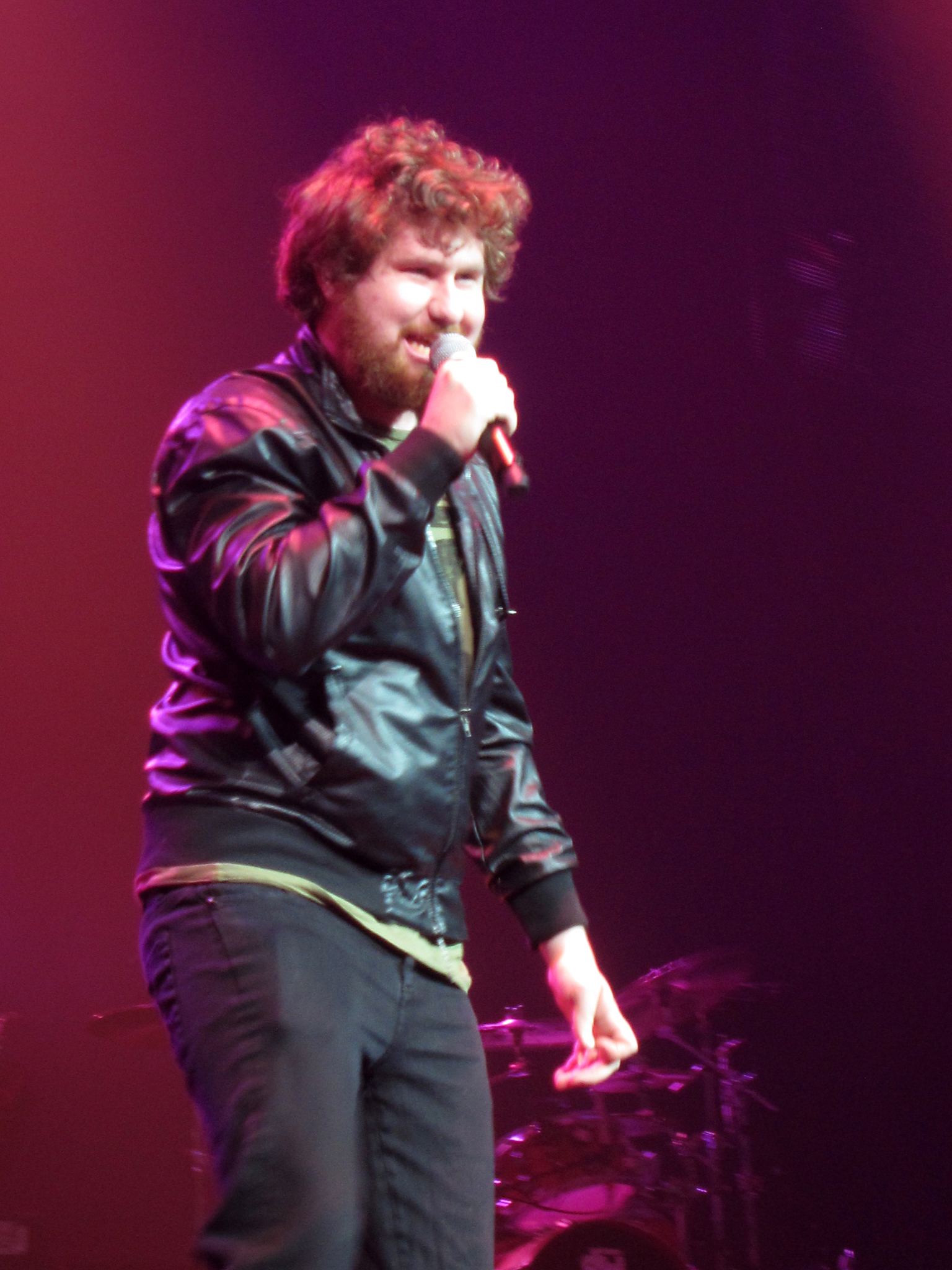
Abrams in concert

Abrams appeared and performed on The Tonight Show with Jay Leno in April 2011, and Live with Regis and Kelly, The Ellen DeGeneres Show, and MTV's The Seven in May of the same year. He was one of the performers in the American Idols LIVE! Tour 2011, which began in West Valley City, Utah, in July 2011, and ended in Manila, Philippines in September 2011.

In August 2011, Abrams became a spokesman in a national campaign called IBD Icons to raise awareness of inflammatory bowel disease.

Abrams and former American Idol season 10 contestant Haley Reinhart recorded a holiday song, "Baby, It's Cold Outside", in November 2011—also released on video.

In January, 2012 Abrams signed with jazz label Concord Music Group. His first album is self-titled, Casey Abrams. The album was executive produced by Randy Jackson and American Songwriter writes that "co-writers on the album include American Idol co-producer Iain Pirie and mega-hit songwriters Jason Mraz, Rune Westberg, Martin Terefe, and Toby Gad." The first single from the album "Get Out" was released on June 5, 2012. The album was released June 26, 2012. Performing on the show gave sales of his album a boost of nearly 2,000% over the previous week.

Abrams appeared on several YouTube videos (e.g.,) with Scott Bradlee's Postmodern Jukebox and toured with them in Europe.

In 2015, Abrams and the Gingerbread Band began work on his independently funded second album, an EP Tales from the Gingerbread House. He has also added the album to PledgeMusic and offered pre-order incentives in order to help fund the album's release. The EP contains five songs, including "Cougartown", which contains background vocals by Haley Reinhart, and "Never Knew What Love Can Do", a duet with Reinhart.

In 2018, Abrams recorded and released his second full-length album, Put a Spell on You, whose title track is a reprisal of his final performance on American Idol. The album was recorded in just two days in Brooklyn's Hirsch Center. The album debuted at #5 on the Billboard Jazz Charts.

In 2019, Abrams released Jazz, marking a full-fledged return to his jazz roots, featuring standards like "I've Got the World on a String" and "Girl from Ipanema". Like Put a Spell on You, Jazz was also recorded at the Hirsch Center, with Abrams calling the decommissioned church's acoustics "magic." The album debuted at #2 on the Billboard Jazz Charts.

== Discography ==
=== Studio albums ===
Title	Album details	Peak chart position		Sales
Title	Album details	US	US Jazz	Sales
Casey Abrams	Release date: June 26, 2012; Label: Concord Music Group; Formats: CD, digital download	101	—	27,000
Put a Spell on You	Release date: March 16, 2018; Label: Chesky Records; Formats: CD, vinyl, digital download	—	5	—
Jazz	Release date: May 31, 2019; Label: Chesky Records; Formats: CD, vinyl, digital download	—	2	—

=== Extended plays ===
Title	Details	Peak chart position	Sales	Track listing
Title	Details	US	Sales	Track listing
Tales From the Gingerbread House	Release date: January 29, 2016; Label: Independent; Format: CD, digital download	—	N/A	1. Cougartown; 2. Just One More Time (These Eyes); 3. Caught; 4. Never Knew What Love Can Do (featuring Haley Reinhart); 5. Shining A Light
Uncovered	Release date: February 21, 2020; Label: Chesky Records; Format: digital download	—	N/A	1. Smooth; 2. What a Wonderful World; 3. I Don't Need No Doctor; 4. In the Wee Small Hours of the Morning

=== Live albums ===
Title	Details	Peak chart position	Sales
Title	Details	US	Sales
Casey Abrams Live	Release date: August 18, 2017; Label: Independent; Format: digital download	—	N/A

=== Singles ===
Year	Single	Peak chart positions			Album
Year	Single	US Adult	Hot AC	US Smooth	Album
2012	"Get Out"	23	39	—	Casey Abrams
2012	"Simple Life"	—	—	9	Casey Abrams
2017	"Really Saying Something"	—	—	—	Non-album singles
2017	"Cowbell"	—	—	—	Non-album singles
2017	"Robot Lovers"	–	–	–	Put a Spell on You
2018	"Let's Make Out"	–	–	–	Put a Spell on You
2020	"Eve of Destruction"	-	-	-	Non-album single

=== Collaborations ===
Year	Title	Peak chart position	
Year	Title	Bubbling Under	Hot AC
2011	"Baby, It's Cold Outside"; Haley Reinhart and Casey Abrams	20	39
2018	"We Three Kings"; Alexander Jean feat. Casey Abrams	–	–

== Videography ==
=== Music videos ===
Year	Video
2011	"Baby, It's Cold Outside" (with Haley Reinhart)
2012	"Simple Life"
2013	"Get Out"
2013	"Stuck in London – Orchestra of People"
2015	"Great Bright Morning - Orchestra of People"
2016	"Never Knew What Love Can Do - Orchestra of People"
2016	"Shining A Light - Orchestra of People"

== See also ==
- List of people diagnosed with ulcerative colitis
