= Rashad Butler =

American football player (born 1983)

No. 78, 79
- Position: Offensive tackle

Personal information
- Born: February 10, 1983 (age 43); West Palm Beach, Florida, U.S.
- Listed height: 6 ft 4 in (1.93 m)
- Listed weight: 310 lb (141 kg)

Career information
- High school: William T. Dwyer (Palm Beach Gardens, Florida)
- College: Miami (FL)
- NFL draft: 2006: 3rd round, 89th overall pick

Career history
- Carolina Panthers (2006); Houston Texans (2007−2012); Cleveland Browns (2013); Pittsburgh Steelers (2013)

Career NFL statistics
- Games played: 42
- Games started: 4
- Fumble recoveries: 1
- Stats at Pro Football Reference

Rashad Jamaal Butler (born February 10, 1983) is an American former professional football player who was an offensive tackle in the National Football League (NFL). He was selected by the Carolina Panthers in the third round of the 2006 NFL draft. He played college football at the University of Miami.

== College career ==
Butler played college football at the University of Miami. He started parts of three seasons, including most of 2004 when Eric Winston was injured.

== Professional career ==
Pre-draft measurables
Height	Weight	Arm length	Hand span	40-yard dash	20-yard shuttle	Three-cone drill	Vertical jump	Broad jump	Bench press
6 ft 4 5/8 in (1.95 m)	293 lb (133 kg)	36 in (0.91 m)	10 1/4 in (0.26 m)	5.30 s	4.55 s	7.90 s	28.0 in (0.71 m)	8 ft 10 in (2.69 m)	16 reps
All values from NFL Combine/Pro Day

=== Carolina Panthers ===
Butler was selected 89th overall in the third round of the 2006 NFL draft by the Carolina Panthers. Thought to be a project due to his relative light weight for an NFL offensive tackle, he was inactive for his rookie year. He actually lost weight and was cut by the Panthers after 2007 training camp.

=== Houston Texans ===
After signing with the Texans, he was discovered to suffer from ulcerative colitis, a chronic medical condition which prevented him from bulking up. Under medical care, Butler was able to regain the lost weight relatively quickly.

Butler did not appear in any games for the Texans in 2008. A restricted free agent in the 2009 offseason, Butler signed his one-year tender offer from the Texans on April 7.

=== Cleveland Browns ===
Butler signed with the Cleveland Browns on May 8, 2013.

=== Pittsburgh Steelers ===
Butler signed with the Pittsburgh Steelers on November 30, 2013. He left the Steelers two days later on December 2, 2013, for personal reasons.

== See also ==
- List of people diagnosed with ulcerative colitis
