= Loyola Greyhounds men's soccer =

Represents Loyola University Maryland in NCAA Division I soccer

- Founded: 1940; 86 years ago
- University: Loyola University Maryland
- Head coach: Steve Nichols (12th season)
- Conference: Patriot League
- Location: Baltimore, Maryland, US
- Stadium: Ridley Athletic Complex (capacity: 6,000)
- Nickname: Greyhounds
- Colors: Green, Grey, and Black
Home	Away

NCAA tournament championships
- 1976

NCAA tournament appearances
- 1971, 1974, 1975, 1976, 1977, 19781, 1986, 1987, 1993, 2001, 2002, 2007, 2008, 2009, 2021

Conference tournament championships
- 1971, 1973, 1974, 1976, 1982, 1983, 1986, 1987, 1989, 1990, 1991, 1992, 1993, 1994, 1995, 1996, 2001, 2002, 2007, 2009, 2021

Conference regular season championships
- 1971, 1974, 1976, 1982, 1983, 1986, 1987, 1989, 1990, 1991, 1992, 1993, 1994, 1995, 1999, 2000, 2001, 2002, 2003, 2004, 2007, 2008, 2009, 2017, 2018, 2019, 2020-21, 2021

The Loyola Greyhounds men's soccer team represents Loyola University Maryland in NCAA Division I soccer. It became a member of the Patriot League on July 1, 2013. Previously it competed in the Metro Atlantic Athletic Conference (MAAC) from 1989 to 2013. To avoid ambiguity, the team is often referenced as Loyola Maryland or Loyola (MD), as there are two other institutions named Loyola that compete at the Division I level (Loyola-Chicago of Illinois and Loyola-Marymount of California).

The team is one of the most successful athletic programs at Loyola, winning numerous MAAC Championships (both regular season and MAAC Tournament), consistently making NCAA Tournament appearances, and often holding national rankings in both the NSCAA/Adidas Poll as well as that of CollegeSoccerNews. In 1987 the Loyola Men's soccer team was ranked #1 in the nation going into the season. The team is currently coached by Steve Nichols, a former (class of 1992) Greyhound player. Nichols was named the ninth head coach in Loyola men's soccer history on February 6, 2014, and just the third in the program's NCAA Division I history since 1982. He took over the reins of a program that advanced to the MAAC Tournaments each year it was a member of the Metro Atlantic Athletic Conference, winning a league-best 12 titles, before joining the Patriot League for the 2013 season. Prior to Nichols, the coach was Mark Mettrick, a former youth and reserve player for Manchester United, who had been at the helm since 2000 and had led the Greyhounds to four NCAA Tournament appearances, reaching the Sweet 16 in 2001. Bill Sento had a strong run prior to Mettrick and lead the team for 20 seasons filled with great success and many Top 10 and Top 20 national rankings.

Loyola won the NCAA Division II Championship in 1976 - one of two national championships in the school's history - and moved up to the Division I level following the conclusion of the 1978 season.

== History ==
=== Beginnings: 1940–1979 ===
The rich tradition of Loyola Soccer began in 1940 with a simple five game schedule against local opponents; the team's first win did not come until the following season, with a 3–0 victory over local rival Towson University. Loyola's success in its early years was limited; the team had some difficulty in finding a long-term coach and Lefty Reitz - the school's head basketball coach - filled the position three separate times on an interim basis. Loyola did have its first notably successful season in 1962 under the direction of Reitz with a 9-2-2 record, including victories against American, Georgetown, and a 5-0 massacre of local rival Johns Hopkins.

James Bullington was the fourth coach in Loyola's Soccer history, during which he enjoyed fifteen (15) consecutive winning seasons. His team gained four Mason-Dixon Championships and a South Atlantic Regional Championship in 1971 when the Greyhounds enjoyed an undefeated season. He also led the team to winning the NCAA II championship in 1976.

=== The reign of Sento: 1980–1999 ===
After Bullington retired from coaching following the 1979 season, local coach Bill Sento was hired as the head coach of the Greyhounds, and he would lead the team for 20 seasons at the NCAA Division I level. Despite Loyola's relatively small size as a Division I school and the lack of top quality athletic facilities, Sento proved a capable recruiter and was able to bring top-level talent to the Evergreen, including several players such as Bill Heiser and Zach Thornton who had international experience on US youth national teams as well as others from top-level club programs throughout the country.

Sento's first season resulted in a 4-9-2 overall record, but that was Loyola's worst during his entire tenure. In fact, Loyola had only one other losing season under Bill Sento (in 1997). Sento almost immediately progressed the Loyola men's soccer program onto the national stage. In 1983, the team finished 17-3-0 including a 4–1 victory against the University of Maryland and finished as ECAC Metro Champions. Led by players such as the Koziol brothers (Stan and Joe) and Chris Webbert, in 1986 (17-1-4) and 1987 (17-4-2) the Greyhounds went to the NCAA Division I Quarterfinals; both years they beat the University of Virginia (coached by former US National Team manager Bruce Arena) in the tournament and were ranked #1 in the nation going into the 1987 season.

Other successful seasons followed such as 1990 (16-2-5) and 1992 (16-4-1), and in 1993 (19-3-1) the Greyhounds - led by Thornton, Heiser, Mark Harrison, and Bill Wnek - again marched into the NCAA Tournament, this time losing to Virginia 2–1 in the second round after being up 1-0 for most of the game.

Despite other notable campaigns and MAAC Championships, the Greyhounds were unable to replicate the overwhelming successes of the late 1980s and early 1990s, and Sento did not have his contract renewed after the 1999 season despite a strong team with 13-6-2 record and being named MAAC Coach of the Year. The Sento Era ended with 407 total games played, of which 255 were wins against 112 losses and 40 ties.

=== Mettrick takes over: 2000–2013 ===
==== 2000–2002 ====
Following the departure of Sento, Loyola initiated a search for a new head soccer coach, receiving interest from several hundred local and national prospects. Eventually Mark Mettrick was offered the position and in January 2000, became the new head coach of Loyola Soccer. Mettrick inherited a team that had gone 13-6-2 in the previous campaign, had won the MAAC regular season and was upset in the MAAC Tournament final, so the cupboard certainly was not bare. Mettrick built the team around its core strengths - goalkeeper Reb Beatty and the defense led by Niall Lepper and Michael Nelson - and led the team to a 12-4-1 record along with a #21 national ranking in his first season. Returning all but one starter in 2001, the Greyhounds were primed for a good season but started off with an incredibly poor performance in a season-opening tournament in California with a loss to the University of California and a tie against Cal St. Fullerton. However, Loyola turned things around quickly, catalyzed by a 1–0 victory at the University of Maryland, and went on a 19-game unbeaten streak before a loss in the Round of 16 of the NCAA Tournament at St. Louis. Loyola finished the 2001 season with a record of 17-2-2 and ranked in the Top 10 nationally. Loyola lost key players for the 2002 season including Nelson, Bobby Von Bremen, and Arturo Lopez, but Beatty and Lepper returned for their senior seasons and led the team to an early season #8 national ranking and an eventual 13-5-3 overall record before falling to Furman in the NCAA Tournament.

==== 2003–2006 ====
From 2003 to 2006, Loyola was unable to continue to build upon the success that Loyola had from 1999 to 2002, entering a period without an appearance in the national tournament, including back-to-back losing seasons in 2005 and 2006 during one of the worst 2-year periods of Loyola Greyhound soccer since the 1960s. In 2003 Loyola lost for the first time at home since the 1998 season, but did battle back to make the MAAC Tournament Final narrowly losing to Saint Peters at the Wide World of Sports Complex in Orlando, Florida. Led by a strong Senior Class, the 2004 Men's Team went 9–0 in MAAC Conference play winning the regular season MAAC Title; but lost to Rider in the Semi-Finals of the MAAC Tournament during a game played in torrential rain and terrible field conditions. During 2005 and 2006, the team failed to win the regular season MAAC title for the 1st time since 1998 as the team struggled with mediocre talent.

==== 2007–2013 ====
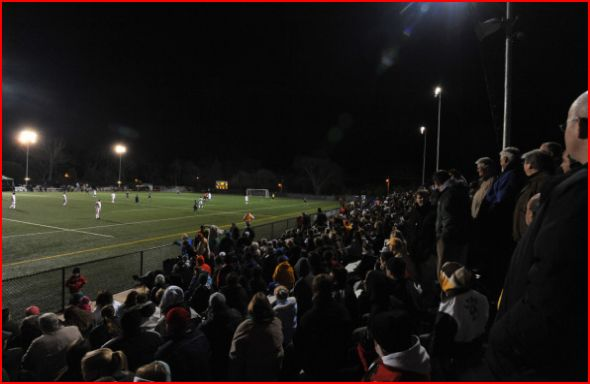
Loyola Greyhounds at home, NCAA Tournament 2008

Fortunately Mettrick and the Greyhounds were able to turn things around quickly in 2007, returning to the national stage with a 19-3-1 record, a MAAC Championship, and the team's first NCAA appearance since 2002 that saw the team victorious in a first round match against Liberty before falling to Maryland in penalty kicks. Led once again by the defense captained by 2007 and 2008 MAAC Defensive Player of the Year Tennant McVea and including goalkeeper Milos Kocic, these Greyhounds demonstrated offensive firepower as well with the likes of Jamie Darvill and Phil Bannister, and the team continued its success in the 2008 campaign, going undefeated in the regular season and earning a ranking as high as #6 in the nation before two upset defeats (in the MAAC final against Fairfield and in the NCAA Second Round against UNC Greensboro) prematurely ended the season. Loyola is well positioned for a strong start in the 2009 season, with two seniors and one junior named on the 2009 Men's Missouri Athletic Club Hermann Trophy Watch List. In addition to strengthening his non conference matches, Mettrick has called on Crystal Palace Baltimore defender and former Fairfield Stags standout Bryan Harkin as an assistant coach; and former Welsh youth International Gerwyn Jones to anchor his backline.

On November 12, 2013, Loyola University Maryland declined to re-sign Mettrick upon the completion of his contract with the 2013 season.

== Players, awards, and recognition ==
=== Current roster ===
As of 20 Sep 2024

Note: Flags indicate national team as defined under FIFA eligibility rules; some limited exceptions apply. Players may hold more than one non-FIFA nationality.

No.	Pos.	Nation	Player
0	GK	USA	Ryan Haskell
1	GK	USA	Dylan Van der Walt
2	DF	USA	Pat Kakayira
4	DF	NED	Jordy Luchies
6	MF	IRL	Sean McEvoy
7	FW	USA	Cole McEvoy
8	MF	USA	Richie Nichols
9	FW	ENG	Rolando Onu
10	FW	USA	Caden Stafford
11	FW	USA	Jake Sweeney
12	FW	ISL	Ólafur Sigurjónsson
13	DF	USA	Brandon Meminger
14	DF	ENG	Chris Ogor
15	DF	USA	Jahvar Stephenson
16	DF	USA	Eddie Smith

No.	Pos.	Nation	Player
17	MF	USA	Cody Angelini
18	MF	CAN	Ben Schouten
19	DF	USA	Jake Mayer
22	DF	ENG	Oscar Halls
23	FW	USA	Steven Ozga
24	MF	USA	Tyler Flynn
25	FW	USA	Seth Powder
26	DF	USA	Curtis Wagner
27	MF	USA	Juston Rainey
28	FW	USA	Charlie Herley
29	MF	USA	Tyler Tucker
30	GK	USA	Nathen Jones
31	GK	USA	Connor O'Keefe
32	DF	USA	Zach Tettemer
33	GK	USA	Alex Bobocea

=== NSCAA Regional All-Americans ===
Nat.	Player
(United States)	Mark Harrison (South Atlantic: 1993, 1994)
(United States)	Zach Thornton (South Atlantic: 1993, 1994)
(United States)	Christof Lindenmayer (South Atlantic: 1998, 1999)
(Scotland)	Niall Lepper (South Atlantic: 2000, 2001, 2002)
(United States)	Reb Beatty (South Atlantic: 2000, 2001, 2002)
(United States)	AJ Ogilvie (South Atlantic: 2001)
(United States)	Michael Nelson (South Atlantic: 2001)
(Colombia)	Omar Alfonso (South Atlantic: 2003, 2004)
(United States)	Gabe Ortega (South Atlantic: 2005)
(Northern Ireland)	Tennant McVea (North Atlantic: 2007, 2008, 2009)
(Serbia)	Milos Kocic (North Atlantic: 2007, 2008)
(England)	Phil Bannister (North Atlantic: 2007, 2008)
(England)	Eddie Dines (North Atlantic: 2007)
(England)	Jamie Darvill (North Atlantic: 2008, 2009)
(United States)	Mike Deasel (North Atlantic: 2008)
(Wales)	Gerwyn Jones (North Atlantic: 2010, 2011, 2012)

=== NSCAA National All-Americans ===
Nat.	Player
(United States)	Nick Kropfelder (1947 - HM)
(United States)	Ernie Cox (1973 - Second, 1974 - First)
(United States)	John Shields (1975 - HM)
(United States)	John Houska (1976 - Second, 1974 - HM)
(United States)	Ian Reid (1976 - HM)
(United States)	Peter Notaro (1977 - HM, 1978 - First)
(United States)	Nick Mangione (1979 - First)
(United States)	Craig Callinan (1983 - Third)
(United States)	Stan Koziol (1986 - Second, 1987 - Second)
(United States)	Joe Koziol (1988 - Third)
(United States)	Jeff Nattans (1988 - Academic, 1989 - Academic)
(United States)	Mark Harrison (1993 - Second)
(United States)	Zach Thornton (1993 - First, 1994 - Third)
(Serbia)	Milos Kocic (2008 - Second)
(Northern Ireland)	Tennant McVea (2008 - First)

=== CollegeSoccerNews.com National All-Americans ===
Nat.	Player
(United States)	Mark Harrison (1993 - Second, 1994 - HM)
(United States)	Zach Thornton (1993 - First, 1994 - Second)
(Scotland)	Niall Lepper (2001 - Third, 2002 - HM)
(United States)	Reb Beatty (2001 - HM, 2002 - HM)
(Northern Ireland)	Tennant McVea (2008 - Third)
(United States)	Christof Lindenmayer (MAAC Player of the Year: 1998, 1999)
(United States)	Reb Beatty (MAAC Rookie of the Year: 1999)
(United States)	Reb Beatty (MAAC Goalkeeper of the Year: 1999, 2000, 2001, 2002)
(Scotland)	Niall Lepper (MAAC Player of the Year: 2001, 2002)
(Colombia)	Omar Alfonso (MAAC Rookie of the Year: 2003)
(Colombia)	Omar Alfonso (MAAC Offensive Player of the Year: 2003)
(England)	Phil Bannister (MAAC Rookie of the Year: 2007)
(Northern Ireland)	Tennant McVea (MAAC Defensive Player of the Year: 2007, 2008, 2009)
(England)	Jamie Darvill (MAAC Offensive Player of the Year: 2008, 2009)

=== First Team All-Conference ===
Nat.	Player
(United States)	Peter Vermes, Bill Harte, Stan Koziol, Joe Koziol, (and others from 1979 to 1992)
(United States)	Michael Konopaski (MAAC: 1992, 1993, 1994)
(United States)	Bill Heiser (MAAC: 1992, 1993, 1994)
(United States)	Mark Harrison (MAAC: 1992, 1993, 1994)
(United States)	Zach Thornton (MAAC: 1993, 1994)
(United States)	Bill Wnek (MAAC: 1993, 1994)
(United States)	David Briles (MAAC: 1993, 1994, 1995)
(United States)	Brian Geraghty (MAAC: 1994 - HM)
(United States)	Chris Doyle (MAAC: 1994 - HM, 1995 MAAC PLAYER OF THE YEAR)
(United States)	Tim Shields (MAAC: 1994)
(United States)	Michael Barger (MAAC: 1995)
(United States)	Ari Edelman (MAAC: 1995 - HM, 1996)
(United States)	Michael Burke (MAAC: 1995 - HM, 1996)
(United States)	Joseph Schafer (MAAC: 1996)
(United States)	Kevin Alvero (MAAC: 1996 - HM)
(United States)	JT Dorsey (MAAC: 1996 - HM)
(United States)	Matthew Whelpley (MAAC: 1996 - HM)
(United States)	Tasos Georgiou Vatikiotis (MAAC: 1996 - HM)
(United States)	Mike Werle (MAAC: 1997)
(United States)	Eric Coles (MAAC: 1997 - HM, 1998 - HM)
(United States)	Dave Frieder (MAAC: 1998 - HM)
(United States)	Christof Lindenmayer (MAAC: 1998, 1999)
(United States)	Michael Stromberg (MAAC: 1999)
(United States)	Charlie McDoniel (MAAC: 1999)
(United States)	Pete Triolo (MAAC: 1999)
(United States)	Reb Beatty (MAAC: 1999, 2000, 2001, 2002)
(Scotland)	Niall Lepper (MAAC: 2000, 2001, 2002)
(United States)	Michael Nelson (MAAC: 2001)
(United States)	AJ Ogilvie (MAAC: 2001)
(Portugal)	Miguel Abreu (MAAC: 2001, 2002)
(Brazil)	Juliano Adriano de Oliveira (MAAC: 2002)
(United States)	Steve Coleman (MAAC: 2003)
(Colombia)	Omar Alfonso (MAAC: 2003, 2006)
(United States)	Gabe Ortega (MAAC: 2004, 2005, 2006)
(United States)	Kevin Nash (MAAC: 2004)
(Serbia)	Rade Kokovic (MAAC: 2004, 2005, 2006)
(Serbia)	Milos Kocic (MAAC: 2007, 2008)
(Northern Ireland)	Tennant McVea (MAAC: 2007, 2008, 2009)
(England)	Phil Bannister (MAAC: 2008)
(United States)	Daniel Ankrah (MAAC: 2008)
(England)	Jamie Darvill (MAAC: 2008, 2009)
(Wales)	Gerwyn Jones (MAAC: 2010, 2011, 2012)
(United States)	Brian Saramago (Patriot League: 2016, 2017, 2018, 2019)
(United States)	Barakatulla Sharifi (Patriot League: 2016, 2017, 2018, 2019)
(Sweden)	Gabriel Carlsson (Patriot League: 2017, 2018)
(United States)	A Mickey Watson (Patriot League: 2017)
(United States)	Chase Vosick (Patriot League: 2017, 2018)
(United States)	Josh Fawole (Patriot League: 2019)

=== All-time player records ===
==== Goals ====
- Peter Notaro: 81

==== Assists ====
- Stan Koziol: 29
- Mark Harrison: 29

==== Points ====
- Peter Notaro: 185

==== Saves ====
- John Houska: 471

==== Shutouts ====
- Reb Beatty: 43

== Results by year ==
Year	Div.	Conf.	Coach	Record	G.s.	G.a.	Notable
1940	N/A	N/A	Lefty Reitz	0-2-3	4	8	
1941	N/A	N/A	Francis McDonough	6-1-0	19	4	
1942	N/A	N/A	Henry Steingass, Sr.	3-2-0	9	6	
1946	N/A	N/A	Bish Baker	3-4-0	12	10	
1947	N/A	N/A	Bish Baker	6-4-1	35	19	
1948	N/A	N/A	Bish Baker	6-1-0	22	8	
1949	N/A	N/A	Bish Baker	4-4-0	17	10	
1950	N/A	N/A	Bish Baker	5-3-0	22	17	
1951	N/A	N/A	Bish Baker	3-3-0	14	8	
1952	N/A	N/A	Lefty Reitz	0-5-1	6	20	
1953	N/A	N/A	Lefty Reitz	2-6-0	15	21	
1954	N/A	N/A	Tom Lind	4-4-2	24	16	
1955	N/A	N/A	Tom Lind	3-2-4	22	18	
1956	N/A	N/A	Tom Lind	2-7-0	15	32	
1957	N/A	N/A	Tom Lind	2-7-0	16	30	
1958	N/A	N/A	Tom Lind	2-6-2	14	31	
1959	N/A	N/A	Tom Lind	4-5-2	18	26	
1960	II	N/A	Tom Lind	7-5-0	36	22	
1961	II	N/A	Lefty Reitz	4-7-1	15	28	
1962	II	N/A	Lefty Reitz	9-2-2	35	9	
1963	II	N/A	Lefty Reitz	3-6-1	11	18	
1964	II	N/A	Jim Bullington	4-8-0	16	33	
1965	II	N/A	Jim Bullington	6-5-0	25	23	
1966	II	N/A	Jim Bullington	7-6-0	28	20	
1967	II	Mason-Dixon	Jim Bullington	12-2-1	44	15	
1968	II	Mason-Dixon	Jim Bullington	9-0-2	43	11	
1969	II	Mason-Dixon	Jim Bullington	9-2-3	37	22	
1970	II	Mason-Dixon	Jim Bullington	12-2-0	40	9	
1971	II	Mason-Dixon	Jim Bullington	16-0-0	67	11	Mason-Dixon Regular Season and Tournament Champions, NCAA Division II South Region Champions
1972	II	Mason-Dixon	Jim Bullington	11-3-0	60	20	
1973	II	Mason-Dixon	Jim Bullington	11-2-0	45	12	Mason-Dixon Tournament Champions
1974	II	Mason-Dixon	Jim Bullington	14-2-2	50	16	Mason-Dixon Regular Season and Tournament Champions, NCAA Division II South Region Finals
1975	II	Mason-Dixon	Jim Bullington	11-4-0	41	7	NCAA Division II South Region First Round
1976	II	Mason-Dixon	Jim Bullington	21-1-0	89	21	Mason-Dixon Regular Season and Tournament Champions, NCAA Division II National Champions
1977	II	N/A	Jim Bullington	12-2-0	42	15	NCAA Division II First Round
1978	II	N/A	Jim Bullington	14-4-0	64	23	NCAA Division II Second Round
1979	I	ECAC	Jim Bullington	9-6-3	34	21	
1980	I	ECAC	Bill Sento	4-9-2	15	26	
1981	I	ECAC	Bill Sento	10-5-3	33	17	South Atlantic Regional Champions
1982	I	ECAC	Bill Sento	11-7-1	32	23	ECAC Metro Champions
1983	I	ECAC	Bill Sento	17-3-0	55	11	ECAC Metro Champions
1984	I	ECAC	Bill Sento	10-6-3	37	24	
1985	I	ECAC	Bill Sento	14-5-0	41	19	
1986	I	ECAC	Bill Sento	17-1-4	56	20	ECAC Metro Champions, South Atlantic Regional Champions, NCAA Quarterfinals
1987	I	ECAC	Bill Sento	17-4-2	47	16	ECAC Metro Champions, South Atlantic Regional Champions, NCAA Quarterfinals
1988	I	ECAC	Bill Sento	11-6-3	52	25	
1989	I	MAAC	Bill Sento	12-5-3	44	17	MAAC Regular Season and Tournament Champions
1990	I	MAAC	Bill Sento	16-2-5	84	15	MAAC Regular Season and Tournament Champions
1991	I	MAAC	Bill Sento	12-8-2	59	20	MAAC Regular Season and Tournament Champions
1992	I	MAAC	Bill Sento	16-4-1	50	13	MAAC Regular Season and Tournament Champions
1993	I	MAAC	Bill Sento	19-3-1	61	9	MAAC Regular Season and Tournament Champions, NCAA Round of 16
1994	I	MAAC	Bill Sento	15-5-2	78	17	MAAC Regular Season and Tournament Champions
1995	I	MAAC	Bill Sento	15-6-0	53	20	MAAC Regular Season and Tournament Champions
1996	I	MAAC	Bill Sento	11-9-2	42	27	MAAC Tournament Champions
1997	I	MAAC	Bill Sento	9-10-2	36	34	
1998	I	MAAC	Bill Sento	11-8-2	35	30	
1999	I	MAAC	Bill Sento	13-6-2	38	15	MAAC Regular Season Champions
2000	I	MAAC	Mark Mettrick	12-4-2	27	10	MAAC Regular Season Champions
2001	I	MAAC	Mark Mettrick	17-2-2	48	14	MAAC Regular Season and Tournament Champions, NCAA Round of 16
2002	I	MAAC	Mark Mettrick	13-5-2	37	21	MAAC Regular Season and Tournament Champions, NCAA First Round
2003	I	MAAC	Mark Mettrick	11-7-3	40	27	MAAC Regular Season Champions
2004	I	MAAC	Mark Mettrick	11-6-1	37	32	MAAC Regular Season Champions
2005	I	MAAC	Mark Mettrick	8-9-2	24	26	
2006	I	MAAC	Mark Mettrick	7-11-2	22	30	
2007	I	MAAC	Mark Mettrick	19-3-1	39	12	MAAC Regular Season and Tournament Champions, NCAA Second Round
2008	I	MAAC	Mark Mettrick	18-2-1	49	14	MAAC Regular Season Champions, NCAA Second Round
2009	I	MAAC	Mark Mettrick	11-8-2	32	21	MAAC Tournament Champions, 'NCAA First Round'
2010	I	MAAC	Mark Mettrick	9-7-2			
2011	I	MAAC	Mark Mettrick	10-6-2			
2012	I	MAAC	Mark Mettrick	13-6-1			
2013	I	Patriot League	Mark Mettrick	7-8-2			
2014	I	Patriot League	Steve Nichols	5-8-4			
2015	I	Patriot League	Steve Nichols	2-13-2			
2016	I	Patriot League	Steve Nichols	8-6-3			
2017	I	Patriot League	Steve Nichols	11-6-1			Patriot League Regular Season Champions
2018	I	Patriot League	Steve Nichols	12-4-1			Patriot League Regular Season Champions
2019	I	Patriot League	Steve Nichols	10-7-2			Patriot League Regular Season Champions
2021 Spring	I	Patriot League	Steve Nichols	3-2-1			Patriot League South Division Champions
2021	I	Patriot League	Steve Nichols	10-6-4			Patriot League Regular Season and Tournament Champions, NCAA 1st Round

== NCAA tournament appearances ==
- Division I: 1986, 1987, 1993, 2001, 2002, 2007, 2008, 2009, 2021
- Division II: 1971, 1974, 1975, 1976, 1977, 1978

== Titles ==
=== National ===
- NCAA D-II tournament (1): 1976

=== Conference ===
Tournament

- Mason–Dixon (4): 1971, 1973, 1974, 1976
- ECAC (4): 1982, 1983, 1986, 1987
- MAAC (12): 1989, 1990, 1991, 1992, 1993, 1994, 1995, 1996, 2001, 2002, 2007, 2009
- Patriot League (1): 2021

Regular season

- Mason–Dixon (3): 1971, 1974, 1976
- ECAC (4): 1982, 1983, 1986, 1987
- MAAC (16): 1989, 1990, 1991, 1992, 1993, 1994, 1995, 1999, 2000, 2001, 2002, 2003, 2004, 2007, 2008, 2009
- Patriot League (5): 2017, 2018, 2019, 2020–21, 2021
