= P. J. Johns =

American soccer goalkeeper

Personal information
- Full name: Philip Joseph Johns
- Date of birth: June 7, 1958 (age 68)
- Place of birth: Oconomowoc, Wisconsin, United States
- Height: 6 ft 1 in (1.85 m)
- Position: Goalkeeper

Youth career
- 1977–1979: UW–Milwaukee Panthers

Senior career*
Years	Team	Apps	(Gls)
1980–1982	Edmonton Drillers	9	(0)
1983	Vancouver Whitecaps	3	(0)
1983–1984	Vancouver Whitecaps (indoor)	0	(0)
1984–1988	Cleveland Force (indoor)	86	(1)
1988–1989	Tacoma Stars (indoor)	31	(1)
1989–1992	Cleveland Crunch (indoor)	101	(0)
1993	Denver Thunder (indoor)	2	(0)
1993–1995	Canton Invaders (indoor)	39	(0)
1995	Pittsburgh Stingers (indoor)	28	(0)
Total		299	(2)

International career
1992	U.S. Futsal	2	(0)

Managerial career
- 1993: Canton Invaders (assistant)
- * Club domestic league appearances and goals

Philip Joseph Johns (born June 7, 1958, in Oconomowoc, Wisconsin) is a retired American soccer goalkeeper. Johns spent four seasons in the North American Soccer League, eight in the Major Indoor Soccer League, two in the National Professional Soccer League and one in the Continental Indoor Soccer League. He was also a member of the United States national futsal team which placed second at the 1992 FIFA Futsal World Championship.

Johns grew up in Oconomowoc, Wisconsin. He graduated from Oconomowoc High School where he played soccer and was a drummer on the high school band. Johns attended the University of Wisconsin–Milwaukee. He tried out for the Panthers soccer team his sophomore season and played on the team from 1977 to 1979. In 1980, he turned professional with the Edmonton Drillers of the North American Soccer League. He spent three seasons in Edmonton before being traded to the Vancouver Whitecaps for the 1983 season. He played during the 1983-1984 NASL indoor season before being released on March 21, 1984. In the fall of 1984, Johns signed with the Cleveland Force of the Major Indoor Soccer League. He spent the first few months with the team on the reserve squad, moving to the first team in February 1985. He spent four seasons with the Force, including their loss to the San Diego Sockers in the 1988 championship series. He became a free agent in June 1988 and he signed with the Tacoma Stars on November 1, 1988. During the summer of 1989, the Stars and the Cleveland Crunch both bid for Johns services before he re-signed with the Stars in July. However, the Stars sold Johns contract to the Crunch three months later. He played with the Crunch through until 1992. In November and December 1992, he played for the United States national futsal team which placed second at the 1992 FIFA Futsal World Championship in Hong Kong. He then signed with the Denver Thunder where he played half a season. He has the seventh-lowest career goals against average in MISL history. In 1993, he signed as a player/assistant coach with the Canton Invaders of the National Professional Soccer League where he played until 1995.
