= Brian Moore (American soccer) =

American soccer player

Personal information
- Full name: J. Brian Moore
- Position: Midfielder

Youth career
- Maryville College

Senior career*
Years	Team	Apps	(Gls)
–1994	Atlanta Magic		
1994–1995	Dayton Dynamo (indoor)	7	(1)
1995–1996	Atlanta Ruckus		
1995–1996	Cincinnati Silverbacks (indoor)	3	(0)
1997	Columbus Comets (indoor)		
1998	Atlanta Silverbacks		
- * Club domestic league appearances and goals

J. Brian Moore is an American retired soccer midfielder who played professionally in the National Professional Soccer League, A-League and Eastern Indoor Soccer League.

Moore attended Maryville College. In 2013, he was selected for induction into the Maryville Wall of Fame. After college, Moore joined the Atlanta Magic of the USISL. In 1994, the Magic won the USISL indoor championship as Moore was named the "Sizzling Four" Most Valuable Player. During the 1994-1995 indoor season, Moore briefly played for the Dayton Dynamo of the National Professional Soccer League. In 1995, Moore played for the Atlanta Ruckus as it went to the A-League final. In 1996, he began the season with the Ruckus, was released, then rejoined the team late in the season. That fall, he joined the Cincinnati Silverbacks of the NPSL. In 1997, he played for the Columbus Comets of the Eastern Indoor Soccer League, leading the team in scoring. In 1998, Moore played at least one game for the Atlanta Silverbacks. He coaches youth soccer in the Atlanta area.
