= Lefty Reitz =

American coach and administrator (1910–1902)

Biographical details
- Born: January 18, 1910; Frederick, Maryland, U.S.
- Died: April 3, 1992 (aged 82); Timonium, Maryland, U.S.

Coaching career (HC unless noted)

Men's basketball
- 1933–1934: Baltimore (assistant)
- 1934–1935: Baltimore
- 1937–1944: Loyola (MD)
- 1945–1961: Loyola (MD)

Football
- 1933: Baltimore (assistant)
- 1934: Baltimore

Baseball
- 1939–1972: Loyola (MD)

Men's soccer
- 1940: Loyola (MD)
- 1952–1953: Loyola (MD)
- 1961–1963: Loyola (MD)

Men's lacrosse
- 1943: Loyola (MD)

Administrative career (AD unless noted)
- 1937–1973: Loyola (MD)
- 1969–1973: Mason–Dixon Conference (commissioner)

Head coaching record
- Overall: 349–227 (.606) (Men's basketball); 290–245–2 (.542) (Baseball); 18–28–8 (.407) (men's soccer)
- Tournaments: 2–4 (.333) (NAIA BB)

Accomplishments and honors

Championships
- In basketball 1x Maryland Intercollegiate League champion (1940); 5x Mason–Dixon Conference champion (1942, 1947–1949, 1953); In baseball 11x Mason–Dixon Conference champion (1941–1943, 1947, 1948, 1950, 1951, 1956, 1957, 1959, 1963)

Emil George "Lefty" Reitz Jr. (January 18, 1910 – April 3, 1992) was an American athlete, coach, and administrator who was the director of athletics at Loyola University Maryland from 1937 to 1973.

== Early life ==
Reitz was born in Frederick, Maryland and moved to Baltimore during his youth. His father, Emil Reitz, was a professional baseball player.

Reitz played baseball, football, and basketball at Loyola High School and Calvert Hall College High School. He then attended Villanova University, where he played four seasons of basketball and baseball and two seasons of football. He played three games for the Albany Senators of the International League during the 1933 season. He was a member of the Danville Leafs in 1934, but retired during the season due to a shoulder injury.

== Early coaching career ==
Reitz graduated from Villanova in 1933 and began his coaching career that fall at the University of Baltimore. After one season as a football and men's basketball assistant, he was promoted to head coach of both teams in 1934. In 1935, he managed a semipro baseball team in Charlottesville, Virginia. He then returned to Baltimore, where he coached the Bloomingdale Club's baseball and basketball teams and helped coach the Baltimore City Fire Department before their annual game against the Quantico Marines Devil Dogs football team. In 1937, he managed the Calvert Distillery's baseball team.

== Loyola University ==
In 1937, Reitz was named head basketball coach and athletic director at Loyola. At the time of his hiring, the school only competed in four intercollegiate sports. He added track and cross country soon after taking the job and later added fencing, swimming, wrestling, soccer, golf, and lacrosse. He became the school's baseball coach in 1939. He served three stints (1940, 1952–1953, and 1961–1963) as head coach of the Loyola Greyhounds men's soccer team, compiling a 18–28–8 record. In 1943, he took over the Loyola Greyhounds men's lacrosse team after coach Jack Kelly entered the United States Navy. Reitz himself entered the Navy on March 30, 1944. He served for twenty months and returned to the school three games into the 1945–46 basketball season.

From 1946 to 1949, Reitz coached one of the nation's top collegiate players, Jim Lacy. Lacy was the National Collegiate Athletic Association's fifth leading scorer during the 1947–48 season and was sixth in points the following season. He finished his career with 2,154 points, making him the first player to score 2,000 or more points in his collegiate career.

Reitz stepped down as basketball coach in 1961, but continued to serve as AD and coach the baseball team. Under his leadership, the Loyola Greyhounds men's basketball team won 349 games and 5 Mason–Dixon Conference titles.

In 1969, Reitz became commissioner of the Mason–Dixon Conference following the death of Paul Menton. Reitz had been involved with the conference since 1940, when the then-track only Mason–Dixon Conference merged with the Maryland Intercollegiate League. He served three terms as president and became the conference's treasurer in 1947. During his tenure as commissioner, University of Maryland, Baltimore County joined the conference and the rule that barred freshmen from playing varsity sports was eliminated.

In 1973, Kevin Kavanagh succeeded Reitz as Loyola's baseball coach. Reitz finished with 290 career wins and another 11 Mason-Dixon titles. He retired as athletic director later that year.

== Later life ==
Reitz was inducted into the Villanova University Varsity Club and Loyola University Maryland Athletic halls of fame. In 1984, Loyola's new arena was named Reitz Arena in his honor.

Reitz died on April 3, 1992, at a hospice in Timonium, Maryland.
