= Penang Island Jazz Festival =

- Genre: Jazz
- Location: Penang, Malaysia
- Years active: 2004-2017
- Organiser: The Capricorn Connection
- Website: https://www.penangjazz.com/

The Penang Island Jazz Festival, which ran from 2004-2017 over the first weekend in December at the Bayview Beach Resort, was an independent festival organized by The Capricorn Connection, which started out as a two-day event and ultimately expanded into four days with over 100 groups from over 25 countries.

Besides the outdoor main "Jazz By The Beach" stage featuring local and international performers, the festival, which was known for its diversity in talent, had a number of other supporting musical activities.
