= Mo Suri =

American soccer player

Personal information
- Full name: Moises Suri
- Place of birth: Burbank, California, United States
- Positions: Defender; midfielder

Senior career*
Years	Team	Apps	(Gls)
1986–1987	Louisville Thunder (indoor)	29	(5)
1987–1991	Milwaukee Wave (indoor)	110	(12)
1992–1994	Milwaukee Wave (indoor)	68	(28)
1994–1995	Atlanta Magic (indoor)	9	(16)
1995–1999	Atlanta Ruckus		
1996	Milwaukee Wave (indoor)	2	(2)
- * Club domestic league appearances and goals

Moises "Mo" Suri is a retired American soccer player. He played professionally in the National Professional Soccer League, A-League and USISL.

In 1986, Suri, younger brother of Caleb Suri, turned professional with the Louisville Thunder of the American Indoor Soccer Association. That season, the Thunder won the AISA championship and Suri was named to the All Rookie Team. He moved to the Milwaukee Wave in 1987 and went on to play four seasons with them. He left the team in 1991, but on October 22, 1992, the Wave signed Suri. He played two seasons with the Wave, then announced his retirement in August 1994. A few weeks later, he signed with the Atlanta Magic of the USISL. The Magic won the 1994-1995 USISL indoor championship and Suri was selected as league MVP. In the spring of 1995, Suri moved outdoors with the Atlanta Ruckus of the A-League. He played for Atlanta through the 1999 USL A-League season. In January 1996, the Milwaukee Wave signed Suri to a fifteen-day contract. He played two games, scoring two goals.
