= Charlie Morgan (soccer) =

American soccer player and coach

Personal information
- Date of birth: August 14, 1962 (age 64)
- Place of birth: Atlanta, Georgia, U.S.
- Position: Defender

Youth career
- 1983–1984: Clemson Tigers

Senior career*
Years	Team	Apps	(Gls)
1985–1987	Cleveland Force (indoor)	37	(0)
1989–	Atlanta Attack (indoor)		

Managerial career
- 1990: Clemson Tigers (assistant)
- –1995: Atlanta Magic
- 1995: Atlanta Ruckus (assistant)
- 1996: Atlanta Ruckus
- * Club domestic league appearances and goals

Charlie Morgan (born August 14, 1962) is an American retired soccer defender who played professionally in the Major Indoor Soccer League and the National Professional Soccer League. He coached in the A-League and was a two time USISL Coach of the Year.

== Player ==
In 1980, Morgan graduated from Southwest DeKalb High School. His junior and senior season of college, he played for the University of Clemson. His senior season, Morgan was captain of the Tigers as they captured the 1984 NCAA Division I Men's Soccer Championship. In 1985, he signed with the Cleveland Force of the Major Indoor Soccer League. On June 4, 1987, the Force released Morgan. He then moved to the Atlanta Attack of the American Indoor Soccer Association.

== Coach ==
In 1990, Morgan served as an assistant with the Clemson Tigers men's soccer team. By 1993, he was coaching the Atlanta Magic in the USISL because he was the 1993–94 USISL indoor Coach of the Year. Morgan received the award a second time a year later. In 1995, the newly established Atlanta Ruckus hired Morgan as an assistant coach. He moved up to head coach in 1996. In 1997, he moved to the Richmond Kickers as the Director of Soccer Operations. In 2004, Morgan became the head coach of the Frederica Academy boys' and girls' teams. During the eight seasons he spent as coach, Morgan led Frederica Academy girls' team to six Georgia state high school soccer championship and the boys' team to five championships.
