= John Houska =

American soccer player (1956–2020)

Personal information
- Date of birth: May 13, 1956
- Place of birth: Baltimore, Maryland, United States
- Date of death: September 7, 2020 (aged 64)
- Place of death: Baltimore, Maryland, United States
- Position: Goalkeeper

Youth career
- 1973–1976: Loyola Greyhounds

Senior career*
Years	Team	Apps	(Gls)
1978–1980	Memphis Rogues	48	(0)
1979–1980	Memphis Rogues (indoor)	12	(0)
1980–1982	Cleveland Force (indoor)	36	(0)
1982–1984	St. Louis Steamers (indoor)		
- * Club domestic league appearances and goals

John Houska (May 13, 1956 – September 7, 2020) was an American soccer goalkeeper who played professionally in the North American Soccer League and Major Indoor Soccer League.

== College ==
Houska attended Loyola University Maryland, where he played on the men's soccer team from 1973 to 1978. He holds the team records for saves in a season (193) and career (471). When he was a junior in 1976, he served as the Greyhounds' goalkeeper when they won the NCAA Men's Division II Soccer Championship, earning him a mention in Faces in the Crowd in the December 13, 1976 issue of Sports Illustrated. He was also a 1976 Honorable Mention (third team) and 1975 Second Team All American. He was inducted into the Loyola University Maryland Athletic Hall of Fame.

== Professional ==
In 1980, he signed with the Memphis Rogues of the North American Soccer League. He led the league during the 1979-1980 NASL indoor season. In the fall of 1980, he moved to the Cleveland Force of the Major Indoor Soccer League where he spent two seasons. He also played for the St. Louis Steamers from 1982 to 1984.

He was inducted into the Maryland Soccer Hall of Fame in 1999.
