= Virgil Stevens =

American soccer player

Personal information
- Positions: Forward; midfielder

Youth career
- 1990–1992: Oral Roberts Golden Eagles

Senior career*
Years	Team	Apps	(Gls)
1993–1999	Tulsa Roughnecks		
1993–1998	Tulsa Roughnecks (indoor)		
- * Club domestic league appearances and goals

Virgil Stevens is a retired American soccer player who played professionally in the USISL.

Stevens attended Oral Roberts University, playing on the men's soccer team from 1990 to 1992. In 1993, he joined the Tulsa Roughnecks of the USISL, playing five indoor and seven indoor seasons. He was the 1993-1994 USISL indoor. Although newspapers show that on August 14, 1995, the Pittsburgh Stingers of the Continental Indoor Soccer League sent Stevens to the Houston Hotshots for future considerations, he never appeared in a game for either team.
