= Pittsburgh Stingers =

- Full name: Pittsburgh Stingers
- Founded: 1994
- Dissolved: 1995
- Ground: Pittsburgh Civic Arena, Pittsburgh, Pennsylvania
- Capacity: 16,033
- Owner: Howard Baldwin
- Head Coach: Paul Child
- League: Continental Indoor Soccer League

The Pittsburgh Stingers are a defunct indoor soccer team that played in the Continental Indoor Soccer League (CISL) for two seasons from 1994 to 1995.

== History ==
Pittsburgh was awarded a franchise by the Continental Indoor Soccer League on December 16, 1992, to begin play in the 1994 CISL season, owned by then-Pittsburgh Penguins' owner Howard Baldwin. Former Pittsburgh Spirit player Paul Child served as the team's coach for both of its seasons. Following two unsuccessful seasons, the Stingers folded.

== Year-by-year ==
Year	League	Reg. season	Playoffs	Avg. attendance
1994	CISL	CISL 13–15	Lost Quarterfinals	2,929
1995	CISL	CISL 10–18	Opted out of Playoffs	3,253

== Players ==
- (United States) Bob Lilley (1994)
- (United States) P.J. Johns (1995)
- (United States) David Moxom (1995)
- (United States) Doug Petras (1994)
- (Iran) Kia Zolgharnain (1994–95)
- (Croatia) Drago (1995): 29 Apps 24 Goals
