= Mark Mettrick =

American soccer player (born 1964)

Personal information
- Date of birth: October 3, 1964 (age 62)
- Place of birth: Manchester, England
- Position: Midfielder

Youth career
- 1982–1984: Manchester United

College career
Years	Team	Apps	(Gls)
1984–1987	Hartwick Hawks		

Senior career*
Years	Team	Apps	(Gls)
1988–1992	Baltimore Blast (indoor)	117	(31)
1993–1995	Baltimore Bays		
1997	Baltimore Bays		

Managerial career
- 1993: Mount St. Mary's Mountaineers (assistant)
- 1994–1999: Mount St. Mary's Mountaineers
- 2000–2013: Loyola Greyhounds
- 2014–: Gettysburg Bullets
- * Club domestic league appearances and goals

Mark Mettrick (born October 3, 1964) is an English-American former soccer player who played four seasons as a midfielder in the Major Indoor Soccer League and three in the USISL. He is the head coach of Gettysburg College.

== Playing career ==
Mettrick grew up in Manchester, England, playing in the Manchester United youth system from 1982 to 1984. Mettrick was offered a spot in the Manchester United reserve team, but chose to attend Hartwick College where he was a member of the men's soccer team from 1984 to 1987. During his four seasons with the Hawks, they went to two NCAA Final Fours. He finished his career with forty-six career goals and earned first team All American recognition in 1985 and 1987. Mettrick was inducted into the Hartwick Athletic Hall of Fame on September 20, 1997. He graduated in 1988 with a bachelor's degree in physics. In 1988, the Baltimore Blast of Major Indoor Soccer League (MISL) picked Mettrick in the first round of the MISL Draft. He played for the Blast until 1992, the year the MISL folded. During his four seasons with the Blast, the team went to the 1989 and 1990 finals, losing both times. In 1993, Mettrick signed with the expansion Baltimore Bays of the USISL. He was named to the 1993 All Atlantic Division Team. He played for the Bays through at least the 1994–1995 USISL indoor season. In 1997, he played for the Bays during the USISL indoor season.

== Coaching career ==
=== Mount St. Mary's University ===
In 1993, Mount St. Mary's University hired Mettrick as an assistant to the men's soccer team. In 1994, he moved up to the head coaching position. In his six seasons as head coach, he took Mount St. Mary's to a 57–42–12 record.

=== Loyola College in Maryland ===
In 2000, Loyola College in Maryland hired Mettrick as its head soccer coach, replacing the veteran Bill Sento, who had been at the helm for two decades.

==== 2000–2002 ====
Mettrick's first three seasons at the Evergreen were quite successful. In 2000, he took advantage of a team that was largely intact from the 1999 season, adding only Scottish central defender Niall Lepper to the starting lineup, and led Loyola to its first national ranking since 1997. Despite a slow start in 2001 after a loss and a tie in a season-opening tournament in California, Loyola went onto a 19-game unbeaten streak before losing to Saint Louis in the Sweet 16 of the NCAA Division I Tournament, relying primarily on the strength of its defense led by Lepper and three-time regional All-America goalkeeper Reb Beatty. Loyola ended the 2001 campaign with a record of 17–2–2, including victories over nationally ranked Maryland (twice), Fairfield, and American, and finished ranked in the Top 10 in the nation. Mettrick was named the NSCAA South Atlantic Region Coach of the Year. Mettrick continued this success into the 2002 season; despite losing six starters, the core of the team in Lepper and Beatty returned and led Mettrick's gang to a 13–5–3 record and another berth in the NCAA Tournament before falling to Furman.

==== 2003–2006 ====
The 2003 season was Mettrick's first with a team based solely on his recruits; from 2000 to 2002, the majority of the starting lineup consisted of players that had been recruited by Bill Sento. Further complicating matters was the loss of Beatty and Lepper – Loyola's two best players – due to graduation. Loyola was able to reach the MAAC Championship game in 2003 but was defeated in the final by Saint Peter's, starting a streak of four consecutive years without an MAAC championship. This streak included losing seasons in both 2005 and 2006.

==== 2007–2013 ====
Under pressure to turn things around, Mettrick took the best pieces of his 2006 team and added several new recruits, leading to an incredible change of fortune. In both 2007 and 2008 he coached the Greyhounds into the NCAA Tournament, reaching the second round both years. In 2008, he was awarded the NSCAA/Adidas Coach of the Year award for the North Atlantic Region after leading the team to an undefeated regular season in the MAAC. The Greyhounds reached the NCAA College Cup for a school Division I record third-straight season in 2009. Loyola then finished with a 9–7–2 record in 2010. Mettrick was relieved of his duties on November 12, 2013.
