= Chattanooga Express =

American soccer club

- Founded: 1992
- Dissolved: 1997
- League: USISL PDSL
- 1997: 5th Southeast

Chattanooga Express were a soccer club that competed in the USISL from 1992 to 1997. The club originally started in 1992 as the Chattanooga Railroaders in the USISL. They became the Chattanooga Express in 1993. The club played in both the indoor and outdoor USISL leagues through 1996. They moved to the USISL Pro League in 1995 and were later relegated to the USISL PDSL in 1997.

== Year-by-year ==
| Year | Division | League | Reg. season | Playoffs | Open Cup |
|---|---|---|---|---|---|
| 1992 | N/A | USISL | 6th, Southeast | Did not qualify | Did not enter |
| 1992/93 | N/A | USISL Indoor | 2nd, Southeast | Playoffs | N/A |
| 1993 | N/A | USISL | 7th, Southeast | Did not qualify | Did not enter |
| 1993/94 | N/A | USISL Indoor | 2nd, Southeast | Final | N/A |
| 1994 | 3 | USISL | 7th, Midsouth | Did not qualify | Did not enter |
| 1994/95 | N/A | USISL Indoor | 3rd, Mid-South | Preliminary Games | N/A |
| 1995 | 3 | USISL Pro League | 3rd, Southeast | Divisional Finals | Did not qualify |
| 1995/96 | N/A | USISL Indoor | 6th, Southeast | Did not qualify | N/A |
| 1996 | 3 | USISL Pro League | 6th, South Atlantic | Did not qualify | Did not qualify |
| 1997 | "4" | USISL PDSL | 5th, Southeast | Did not qualify | Did not qualify |
