= Baltimore Bays (1993–1998) =

Soccer team in the United States, 1993–98

The third Baltimore Bays were a soccer team based in Baltimore, Maryland, that played in the USISL. They became the Eastern Shore Sharks in 1998 when they moved to Salisbury, Maryland. Many of the 97-98 players from the indoor version of the Bays went on to play for the Baltimore Blast of the NPSL for the 1998-99 indoor season. Additionally the long time coach of the Bays, Kevin Healey went on to a long career as a coach and later General Manager of the Blast.

== Year-by-year ==
Year	Division	League	Reg. season	W - L	Playoffs	W - L	Open Cup
1993	N/A	USISL	7th, Atlantic	5-11	Did not qualify	N/A	Did not enter
1993/94	N/A	USISL Indoor	1st, Northern	12-0	3rd Place	2-1^{1}	N/A
1994	3	USISL	8th, Atlantic	6-12	Did not qualify	N/A	Did not enter
1994/95	N/A	USISL Indoor	1st, north–south	10-2	Semifinals	1-1	N/A
1995	3	USISL Pro League	6th, Coastal	4-16	Did not qualify	N/A	Did not qualify
1995/96	N/A	USISL Indoor	1st, Northeast	7-0	Champion	3-0	N/A
1996	3	USISL Pro League	7th, Northeast	5-11	Did not qualify	N/A	Did not qualify
1996/97	N/A	USISL I-League	1st, East	11-0	Champion	2-0	N/A
1997	3	USISL D-3 Pro League	3rd, Mid-Atlantic	8-10	Quarterfinals	2-1	Did not qualify
1997/98	N/A	USISL I-League	1st	10-0	Champion	1-0	N/A

^{1} includes 3rd Place mini game results

All time regular season outdoor record 28-60, playoff record 2-1. The USISL used shootouts to resolve tie games during these seasons.

All time regular season indoor record 50-2, Playoff record 9-2.
