= 2005 PDL season =

USL Premier Development League
- Season: 2005
- Champions: Des Moines Menace (1st Title)
- Regular Season Champions: Orange County Blue Star (1st Title)
- Matches: 430
- Goals: 1,723 (4.01 per match)
- Best player: (Mexico) Daniel Frías El Paso Patriots
- Top goalscorer: (United States) Andy Metcalf Cape Cod Crusaders, (Canada) Frederico Moojen Cocoa Expos (18 Goals Each)
- Best goalkeeper: (United States) Nathan Pena Orange County Blue Star

The 2005 PDL season was the 11th USL Premier Development League season. The season began in April and ended in August.

Des Moines Menace finished the season as national champions, beating El Paso Patriots 6–5 on penalty kicks, following a 0–0 draw in the PDL Championship game in El Paso, Texas on 13 August 2005.

Orange County Blue Star finished with the best regular season record in the league, winning 15 out of their 16 games, suffering just one loss, and finishing with a +39 goal difference.

Cape Cod Crusaders striker Andy Metcalf and Cocoa Expos forward Frederico Moojen were the league's top scorers, each knocking in 18 goals. Richmond Kickers Future's Cristian Neagu led the league with 12 assists, while Orange County Blue Star keeper Nate Pena enjoyed the best goalkeeping statistics, with a goals-against average of 0.466 per game, and keeping 7 clean sheets in his 14 games.

== Changes from 2004 ==
=== Name changes ===
- Albany Blackwatch Highlanders became Albany Admirals
- South Jersey Barons became Ocean City Barons

=== New franchises ===
- Seven new teams joined the league this year, including four brand new franchises:

Team name	Metro area	Location	Previous affiliation
(Georgia (U.S. state)) Augusta FireBall	Augusta area	Augusta, GA	expansion
(California) Bakersfield Brigade	Bakersfield area	Bakersfield, CA	expansion
California Gold	Modesto area	Modesto, CA	previously in USL Pro Select
(Ontario) Ottawa Fury	Ottawa area	Ottawa, ON	expansion
(California) San Diego Gauchos	San Diego area	San Diego, CA	previously in USL Pro Select
(Missouri) Springfield Storm	Springfield area	Springfield, MO	expansion
(New York (state)) Westchester Flames	northern suburban New York area	New Rochelle, NY	previously in USL Pro Select

=== Folding ===
- Eight teams left the league prior to the beginning of the season:
  - Chesapeake Dragons – Germantown, Maryland
  - Columbus Shooting Stars – Columbus, Ohio
  - Indiana Blast – Indianapolis, Indiana
  - Jersey Falcons – Jersey City, New Jersey
  - Lafayette Swamp Cats – Lafayette, Louisiana
  - New Jersey Stallions – Wayne, New Jersey
  - St. Louis Strikers – St. Louis, Missouri
  - Wisconsin Rebels – Menasha, Wisconsin

== Standings ==
Legend
Division champion
Team qualified for playoff berth

=== Central Conference ===
==== Great Lakes Division ====
Pos	Team	Pld	W	L	T	GF	GA	GD	Pts
1	Chicago Fire Premier	16	14	1	1	47	11	+36	43
2	Michigan Bucks	16	11	4	1	44	17	+27	34
3	Indiana Invaders	16	11	5	0	34	21	+13	33
4	Fort Wayne Fever	16	7	9	0	32	46	−14	21
5	Kalamazoo Kingdom	16	6	8	2	23	28	−5	20
6	West Michigan Edge	16	6	9	1	30	35	−5	19
7	Cleveland Internationals	16	5	8	3	28	31	−3	18
8	Toledo Slayers	16	2	12	2	15	53	−38	8

==== Heartland Division ====
Pos	Team	Pld	W	L	T	GF	GA	GD	Pts
1	Boulder Rapids Reserve	16	13	2	1	53	18	+35	40
2	Des Moines Menace	16	12	3	1	45	16	+29	37
3	Kansas City Brass	16	8	8	0	43	38	+5	24
4	Thunder Bay Chill	16	6	9	1	29	37	−8	19
5	Springfield Storm	16	5	10	1	24	40	−16	16
6	Colorado Springs Blizzard	16	4	11	1	20	46	−26	13
7	Sioux Falls Spitfire	16	3	12	1	25	46	−21	10

=== Eastern Conference ===
==== Mid Atlantic Division ====
Pos	Team	Pld	W	L	T	GF	GA	GD	Pts
1	Richmond Kickers Future	16	12	2	2	43	23	+20	38
2	Carolina Dynamo	16	9	6	1	41	27	+14	28
3	Raleigh CASL Elite *	15	8	4	3	40	29	+11	27
4	Augusta Fireball *	13	6	7	0	24	25	−1	18
5	West Virginia Chaos	16	5	10	1	22	45	−23	16
6	Williamsburg Legacy	16	4	9	3	23	32	−9	15

==== Northeast Division ====
Pos	Team	Pld	W	L	T	GF	GA	GD	Pts
1	Cape Cod Crusaders	16	13	2	1	50	22	+28	40
2	Ocean City Barons	16	12	3	1	47	21	+26	37
3	Ottawa Fury	16	9	7	0	42	29	+13	27
4	Albany Admirals	16	8	7	1	31	29	+2	25
5	Vermont Voltage	16	7	9	0	28	38	−10	21
6	Reading Rage	16	6	8	2	27	24	+3	20
7	Rhode Island Stingrays	16	6	9	1	35	44	−9	19
8	Brooklyn Knights	16	4	10	2	25	54	−29	13 (Note: 1 point deducted)
9	Westchester Flames	16	3	13	0	23	47	−24	9

=== Southern Conference ===
==== Mid South Division ====
Pos	Team	Pld	W	L	T	GF	GA	GD	Pts
1	El Paso Patriots	16	11	3	2	54	23	+31	35
2	Laredo Heat	16	9	7	0	32	26	+6	27
3	Austin Lightning	16	7	7	2	33	36	−3	23
4	DFW Tornados	16	7	8	1	27	31	−4	22
5	Nashville Metros	16	7	9	0	32	43	−11	21
6	New Orleans Shell Shockers	16	6	9	1	21	31	−10	19
7	Memphis Express	16	5	10	1	27	41	−14	16

==== Southeast Division ====
Pos	Team	Pld	W	L	T	GF	GA	GD	Pts
1	Cocoa Expos	16	11	3	2	40	26	+14	35
2	Central Florida Kraze	16	8	6	2	27	19	+8	26
3	Bradenton Academics	16	8	8	0	38	25	+13	24
4	Ajax Orlando Prospects	16	4	12	0	23	44	−21	12
5	Palm Beach Pumas	16	4	12	0	25	52	−27	12

=== Western Conference ===
==== Northwest Division ====
Pos	Team	Pld	W	L	T	GF	GA	GD	Pts
1	Cascade Surge	16	12	2	2	47	23	+24	38
2	Spokane Shadow	16	10	6	0	38	33	+5	30
3	Yakima Reds	16	4	9	3	19	25	−6	15
4	Abbotsford Rangers	16	3	13	0	21	44	−23	9

==== Southwest Division ====
Pos	Team	Pld	W	L	T	GF	GA	GD	Pts
1	Orange County Blue Star (R)	16	15	1	0	46	8	+38	45
2	Southern California Seahorses	16	11	4	1	30	19	+11	34
3	Fresno Fuego	16	10	5	1	36	27	+9	31
4	BYU Cougars	16	8	7	1	32	27	+5	25
5	Bakersfield Brigade	16	6	8	2	26	28	−2	20
6	Nevada Wonders	16	5	11	0	19	37	−18	15
7	California Gold	16	4	10	2	20	39	−19	14
8	San Diego Gauchos	16	1	13	2	17	41	−24	2 (Note: 3 points deducted)

(R) Regular Season Champions

== Playoffs ==
Conference Semifinals
NE1	(Massachusetts) Cape Cod Crusaders	1
MA2	(North Carolina) Raleigh CASL Elite	2
Eastern Conference
MA1	(Virginia) Richmond Kickers Future	5
NE2	(New Jersey) Ocean City Barons	4
MS1	(Texas) El Paso Patriots	2
SE2	Central Florida Kraze	1
Southern Conference
SE1	(Florida) Cocoa Expos	1
MS2	(Texas) Laredo Heat	2
GL1	(Illinois) Chicago Fire Premier	0
HL2	(Iowa) Des Moines Menace	3
Central Conference
HL1	(Colorado) Boulder Rapids Reserve	1
GL2	Michigan Bucks	4
SW1	(California) Orange County Blue Star	2
SW3	(California) Fresno Fuego	1
Western Conference
NW	(Oregon) Cascade Surge	2
SW2	Southern California Seahorses	1

Conference Finals
MA2	(North Carolina) Raleigh CASL Elite	1
MA1	(Virginia) Richmond Kickers Future	2
MS1	(Texas) El Paso Patriots	2
MS2	(Texas) Laredo Heat	0
HL2	(Iowa) Des Moines Menace	4
GL2	Michigan Bucks	1
SW1	(California) Orange County Blue Star	3
NW	(Oregon) Cascade Surge	0

National Semifinals
MA1	(Virginia) Richmond Kickers Future	3
MS1	(Texas) El Paso Patriots	4
HL2	(Iowa) Des Moines Menace	2
SW1	(California) Orange County Blue Star	1

PDL Championship Game
MS1	(Texas) El Paso Patriots	0 (5)
HL2	(Iowa) Des Moines Menace (PSO)	0 (6)

=== Conference semifinals ===
July 29, 2005
5:30 PM

(Colorado) Boulder Rapids Reserve	1–4 (a.e.t.)	Michigan Bucks
Findley 51'	Report	Turpin 82'; Djokic 94'; Nelson 97'; Kabwe 103'

Waukee Stadium
Waukee, Iowa

July 29, 2005
6:00 PM

(Florida) Cocoa Expos	1–2	(Texas) Laredo Heat
Marino 28'	Report	Infante 2'; Su 48'

Patriot Stadium
El Paso, Texas

July 29, 2005
8:00 PM

(Iowa) Des Moines Menace	3–0	(Illinois) Chicago Fire Premier
Baker 7'; Boltnar 45' (pen.); Kother 54'	Report	Pogue (yellow card) 45'

Waukee Stadium
Waukee, Iowa

July 29, 2005
8:30 PM

(Texas) El Paso Patriots	2–1	Central Florida Kraze
Frías 31'; Andrade 56'	Report	Robertson 90' (pen.)

Patriot Stadium
El Paso, Texas

July 30, 2005
12:00 PM

(California) Orange County Blue Star	2–1	(California) Fresno Fuego
25'; 85'	Report	Codeceira 10'

La Mirada High School
La Mirada, California

July 30, 2005
3:00 PM

(Massachusetts) Cape Cod Crusaders	1–2	(North Carolina) Raleigh CASL Elite
		Camp (pen.); Mobley

Carey Stadium
Ocean City, New Jersey

July 30, 2005
5:30 PM EDT

(New Jersey) Ocean City Barons	4–5	(Virginia) Richmond Kickers Future
Williamson 27'; Carmichael 29'; Mingo 64'	Report	Oduro 25', 90+'; Boateng; Neagu; 85'

Carey Stadium
Ocean City, New Jersey

July 30, 2005
5:00 PM PDT

Southern California Seahorses	1–2	(Oregon) Cascade Surge
Lawson	Report	Ready 80'; McGregor 81'

La Mirada High School
La Mirada, California

=== Conference Finals ===
July 30, 2005
6:30 PM

(Iowa) Des Moines Menace	4–1	Michigan Bucks
Boltnar 37'; Baker 39'; Mujdzic 62'; 74' (o.g.)	Report	Dube 30'

Waukee Stadium
Waukee, Iowa

July 30, 2005
8:30 PM

(Texas) El Paso Patriots	2–0	(Texas) Laredo Heat
Frías 20', 23'	Report

Patriot Stadium
El Paso, Texas

July 31, 2005
12:00 PM

(California) Orange County Blue Star	3–0	(Oregon) Cascade Surge
Theslof 25'; Kljestan 64', 89'	Report

La Mirada High School
La Mirada, California

July 31, 2005
5:30 PM

(Virginia) Richmond Kickers Future	2–1	(North Carolina) Raleigh CASL Elite

Carey Stadium
Ocean City, New Jersey

=== National Semifinals ===
August 6, 2005
7:30 PM

(Iowa) Des Moines Menace	2–1	(California) Orange County Blue Star
Kother 45'; Farabi 63'		Evans 43'; Harvey (yellow card) 89' (yellow-red card)

Waukee Stadium
Waukee, Iowa
Attendance: 1,232

August 6, 2005
8:00 PM

(Texas) El Paso Patriots	4–3	(Virginia) Richmond Kickers Future
Larrosa 15'; Frías 70', 82' (pen.); Andrade 79'	Report	Neagu 31' (pen.), 86'; McIntosh 62'

Patriot Stadium
El Paso, Texas

=== PDL Championship Game ===
August 13, 2005
9:30 PM

(Texas) El Paso Patriots	0–0	(Iowa) Des Moines Menace
	Report
Penalties
Larrosa (penalty scored); Morin (penalty missed); Frías (penalty scored); Samano (penalty scored); Mora (penalty scored); Cabrera (penalty scored); Casteneda (penalty missed)	5–6	(penalty scored) Boltnar; (penalty scored) Mujdzic; (penalty scored) Baker; (penalty scored) Wieland; (penalty scored) Kother; (penalty scored) Farabi; (penalty scored) Frieberg

SISD Student Activities Complex
El Paso, Texas
Attendance: 6,792

Championship MVP: (United States) Andy Gruenebaum (DMM)

== Awards, All–Conference Teams and All-League team ==
=== Year End Awards ===
Scoring Champion: (Canada) Frederico Moojen (Cocoa Expos) 43 Points (18 Goals, 7 Assists)
Golden Boot: (Canada) Frederico Moojen (Cocoa Expos)
(United States) Andrew Metcalf (Cape Cod Crusaders) (18 Goals Each)
Assists Champion: (Romania) Cristian Neagu (Richmond Kickers Future) (12 Assists)
GAA Champion: (United States) Nathan Pena (Orange County Blue Star) 0.47 Goals Against
MVP: (Mexico) Daniel Frías (El Paso Patriots)
U19 Player of the Year: (United States) Brett Hite (Spokane Shadow)
Defender of the Year: (United States) Kevin Taylor (Michigan Bucks)
Goalkeeper of the Year: (United States) Nathan Pena (Orange County Blue Star)
Coach of the Year: (Zimbabwe) Methembe Ndlovu (Indiana Invaders)

=== Weekly awards ===
Player of the Week
Week	Player	Club	Position	Reason	Ref.
3	(Sierra Leone) Kei Kamara	Orange County Blue Star	Forward	4 goals in 5–1 win over Fresno Fuego	
4	(United States) Ruben Mingo	Ocean City Barons	Forward	4 goals in 6–2 win at Westchester Flames	
5	(England) Dan Broxup	Fort Wayne Fever	Forward	4 goals in 5–2 win over Toledo Slayers	
6	(Ghana) Dominic Oduro	Richmond Kickers Future	Forward	4 goals in pair of wins	
7	(Mexico) Daniel Frías	El Paso Patriots	Forward	4 goals, 2 assists in 8–2 win over Nashville Metros	
8	(Ghana) Dominic Oduro	Richmond Kickers Future	Forward	4 goals in 2 wins	
9	(Chile) Pablo Araya Espinozo	New Orleans Shell Shockers	Forward	4 goals, assist in two wins over Laredo Heat	
10	(United States) Charles Altcheck	Westchester Flames	Forward	4 goals in win over Rhode Island Stingrays	
11	(Mexico) Alberto Villarreal	Indiana Invaders	Forward	Two goals in 3-2 OT win over Chicago Fire Premier	
12	(United States) Andy Metcalf	Cape Cod Crusaders	Midfielder	6 goals in pair of wins	
13	(United States) Corey Sipos	Chicago Fire Reserves	Defender	Goal in each of 3 wins, 1 goal allowed total	
14	(United States) Andy Metcalf	Cape Cod Crusaders	Forward	4 goals, assist in 2 road wins	

Team of the Week
Week	Goalkeeper	Defenders	Midfielders	Forwards	Ref.
3	(United States) Shaughnessy (LAR)	(United States) Cooper (WV) (The Bahamas) Hall (BRD) (United States) Harvey (OCB)	(United States) Bohnenkamp (SPR) (France) Voutier (BRD) (United States) DeVall (NAS) (United States) Campbell (SPO)	(Mexico) Frías (ELP) (Sierra Leone) Kamara (OC) (Ukraine) Budnyi (CAS)	
4	(United States) Guillermo (ELP)	(Uganda) Ojuka (BYU) (United States) Pierce (ALB) (United States) Lambert (NO)	(Canada) Moojen (COA) (United States) Carson (BAK) (United States) Snodgrass (BRR) (United States) Craft (MIC)	(United States) Mingo (OCC) (United States) Clark (CAS) (Romania) Neagu (RIC)	
5	(United States) Cunning (VER)	(United States) Cox (YAK) (United States) Dominguez (ELP) (United States) McKenzie (MIC)	(United States) Guadarrama (AUS) (United States) Vacovski (FW) (United States) Theslof (OCB) (United States) Napolitano (RI)	(England) Broxup (FW) (United States) Rolfing (SF) (Morocco) Omekanda (REA)	
6	(United States) Gruenebaum (DMM)	(United States) DeBoalt (CSB) (United States) Morin (ELP) (United States) Brasil (CAL)	(Canada) Moojen (COA) (Czech Republic) Boltnar (DMM) (United States) Carmichael (OCB) (United States) Mertens (YAK)	(Ghana) Oduro (RIC) (United States) Chavez (CAS) (Kuwait) Jaman (CHI)	
7	(United States) Gruenebaum (DMM)	(Serbia) Djordjevic (RIC) (United States) Walker (BAK) (United States) Abbott (DFW)	(Mexico) Ibarra (LAR) (United States) Loch (CF) (United States) Dulworth (FW) (United States) Mingo (OCB)	(Mexico) Frías (ELP) (United States) Meyer (WME) (Brazil) De Souza (TBC)	
8	(United States) Pena (OC)	(United States) Duffy (KCB) (United States) Zayner (CHI) (United States) Wahl (OC)	(France) Voutier (BRD) (United States) McGregor (CAS) (United States) Scheufele (CCC) (United States) Devlin (REA)	(Ghana) Oduro (RIC) (United States) Perkins (KCB) (Canada) Omokhua (OTT)	
9	(United States) Kroll (KAL)	(United States) Doster (CHI) (United States) Horst (REA) (Scotland) McAnespie (NO)	(United States) Fauske (SPO) (United States) Guadarrama (AUS) (United States) McMahen (MIC) (United States) Holder (RIC)	(United States) O'Connor (SCS) (Chile) Araya (NO) (United States) Wadsworth (RAL)	
10	(United States) Munroe (FW)	(United States) Ara (NAS) (United States) Kumangai-McGee (SPO) (United States) MacDonald (RIC)	(Brazil) Guarda (DFW) (United States) Sorto (NEV) (United States) (Szczypriorski (VER) (Canada) Amahazion (OTT)	(United States) Findley (BRR) (Canada) Mavula (OTT) (United States) Altcheck (WES)	
11	(United States) Gorski (COA)	(United States) Tolleson (CAS) (Zimbabwe) Pondwa (COA) (United States) Taylor (MIC)	(United States) Stovall (SCS) (Brazil) Andrade (ELP) (United States) Williamson (OCB) (United States) López (AOP)	(Mexico) Villarreal (IND) (United States) Cook (ALB) (United States) Stacey (WME)	
12	(Argentina) Vecchio (MEM)	(United States) Dunn (OC) (United States) Gold (NO) (United States) Taylor (MIC)	(United States) Metcalf (CCC) (United States) Chambers (REA) (Czech Republic) Boltnar (DMM) (Argentina) Cignetti (FRE)	(Brazil) Antunes (RIS) (United States) Allberry (SPO) (United States) Cerroni (CFK)	
13	(United States) McCurdy (YAK)	(United States) Sipos (CHI) (United States) McKenzie (MIC) (United States) Robertson (CFK)	(United States) Rigby (CAS) (United States) Stovall (SCS) (Czech Republic) Galik (BRD) (Canada) Tachie (OTT)	(Canada) Moojen (COA) (Romania) Neagu (RIC) (United States) Metcalf (CCC)	
14	(United States) Friesz (BRR)	(United States) DeVall (NAS) (United States) Benn (CFK) (United States) Moss (CHI)	(United States) Moose (CAR) (Brazil) Codeceira (FRE) (United States) Oliveria (WVC) (United States) Pompei (REA)	(Zimbabwe) Dube (MIC) (United States) Metcalf (CCC) (United States) Bulow (CCC)	

=== All- Conference Teams ===
==== Central Conference ====
F: (United States) Kyle Brown (CHI), (Jamaica) Dave Leung (CHI), (United States) Kyle Perkins (KCB),
M: (Czech Republic) Tomas Boltnar (DMM)*, (United States) Daniel Bustos (WME)*, (Trinidad and Tobago) Stephan David (IND), (United States) Ryan McMahen (MIC)
D: (Canada) Liam Girard (BRR), (United States) Kevin Taylor (MIC)*, (United States) Jed Zayner (CHI)
G: (United States) Eric Pogue (TOL/CHI)

==== Eastern Conference ====
F: (United States) Ruben Mingo (OCB), (Romania) Cristian Neagu (RIC)*, (Ghana) Dominic Oduro (RIC),
M: (England) John Thompson (OCB)*, (United States) Tony Donatelli (OCB), (United States) Justin Moose (CAR)*, (Serbia) Bo Simić (VER)
D: (United States) David Horst (REA), (Trinidad and Tobago) Kareem Smith (CCC), (Scotland) Stephen Shirley (RIC),
G: (United States) Ryan Carr (OCB)

==== Southern Conference ====
F: (Chile) Pablo Araya (NO), (Mexico) Daniel Frías (ELP)*, (Canada) Frederico Moojen (COA)*
M: (Brazil) Bruno Guarda (AUS), (United States) Miguel Larrosa (ELP), (United States) Dax McCarty (AOP), (Venezuela) Marcelino Uriarte (AUS)
D: Daniel Robertson (CFK), (Guyana) John Rodrigues (NAS), (United States) Brad Whitsett (MEM)
G: (United States) Ryan Shaughnessy (LAR)

==== Western Conference ====
F: (Ukraine) Andriy Budnyi (CAS), (United States) Brett Hite (SPO), (Sierra Leone) Kei Kamara (OC)
M: (United States) Manuel Brasil (CAL), (Brazil) Frabricio Codeceira (FRE)*, (United States) Dana McGregor (CAS), (United States) BJ Pugmire (BYU)
D: (United States) Jose Delgadillo (FRE), (United States) Jordan Harvey (OC), (United States) Josh Westermann (CAS)*
G: (United States) Nathan Pena (OC)*
denotes All-League selection

==== All-League team ====
F: (Mexico) Daniel Frías (ELP) (League MVP); (Canada) Frederico Moojen (COA) (Scoring Champion and co Golden Boot Winner); (Romania) Cristian Neagu (RIC) (Assists Champion)
M: (Czech Republic) Tomas Boltnar (DMM); (United States) Daniel Bustos (WME); (Brazil) Frabricio Codeceira (FRE); (United States) Justin Moose (CAR)
D: (United States) Kevin Taylor (MIC) (Defender of the Year); (England) John Thompson (OCB); (United States) Josh Westermann (CAS)
G: (United States) Nathan Pena (OC) (Goalkeeper of the Year)

== See also ==
- United Soccer Leagues 2005
