= 2007 Los Angeles Galaxy season =

American soccer club season

Los Angeles Galaxy
2007 season
- Owner: Philip Anschutz (AEG)
- Coach: Frank Yallop
- Major League Soccer: Western Conference: 5th Overall: 10th
- MLS Cup: Did not qualify
- U.S. Open Cup: Third round
- SuperLiga: Runners-up
- Top goalscorer: League: Landon Donovan (8); All: Landon Donovan (12)
- Average home league attendance: 24,252
Home colors	Away colors

The 2007 LA Galaxy season was the 12th season of the team's existence, and their 12th in Major League Soccer, the top flight of American soccer. The season was highlighted by the first season of David Beckham's career in MLS with the Galaxy. Outside of MLS the Galaxy played in the U.S. Open Cup, where they reached the third round, and the inaugural edition of the North American SuperLiga, CONCACAF's former secondary club tournament. In the Open Cup, the Galaxy reached the third round, while in the SuperLiga, the Galaxy finished as runners-up. Their 5th place record in the West was not good enough for the Galaxy to earn a berth into the MLS Cup playoffs, making it the second-consecutive year the Galaxy did not qualify for the playoffs.

Along with Beckham's mid-season arrival, the team changed its image and released new home and away kits along with a new team logo. Before his arrival, Galaxy used their previous season's white away as their home kit, and the yellow home as the away kits. In an effort to keep up with the rest of the world's soccer marketing tactics, MLS allowed for clubs to have shirt sponsors on the front, and since then, local brand Herbalife became the Galaxy's main shirt sponsor.

== Club ==
Squad No.	Name	Nationality	Position(s)	Date of birth (age)	Signed from
Goalkeepers
0	Steve Cronin	(United States)	GK		(United States) San Jose Earthquakes
1	Joe Cannon	(United States)	GK		(United States) Colorado Rapids
35	Lance Friesz	(United States)	GK		(United States) Los Angeles Storm
Defenders
2	Mike Randolph	(United States)	DF		(United States) Portland Timbers
3	Ty Harden	(United States)	DF		(United States) University of Washington
4	Ante Jazić	(Canada)	DF		(Russia) Kuban Krasnodar
5	Chris Albright	(United States)	DF		(United States) D.C. United
12	Troy Roberts	(United States)	DF		(United States) Sonoma County Sol
16	Kyle Veris	(United States)	DF		(United States) Michigan Bucks
17	Abel Xavier	(Portugal)	DF		(England) Middlesbrough
22	Kelly Gray	(United States)	DF		(United States) Houston Dynamo
Midfielders
6	Kevin Harmse	(South Africa)	MF		(Slovakia) Nitra
7	Chris Klein	(United States)	MF		(United States) Real Salt Lake
8	Peter Vagenas	(United States)	MF		(United States) UCLA
13	Cobi Jones	(United States)	MF		(Brazil) Vasco da Gama
15	Quavas Kirk	(United States)	MF		(United States) IMG Soccer Academy
18	Kyle Martino	(United States)	MF		(United States) Columbus Crew
19	Josh Tudela	(United States)	MF		(United States) Indiana University
23	David Beckham	(England)	MF		(Spain) Real Madrid
Forwards
9	Gavin Glinton	(Turks and Caicos Islands)	FW		(United States) Bradley University
10	Landon Donovan	(United States)	FW		(Germany) Bayer 04 Leverkusen
11	Israel Sesay	(Sierra Leone)	FW		(United States) IMG Soccer Academy
14	Edson Buddle	(United States)	FW		(Canada) Toronto FC
20	Carlos Pavón	(Honduras)	FW		(Honduras) Real España
21	Alan Gordon	(United States)	FW		(United States) Portland Timbers
27	Mike Caso	(United States)	FW		(United States) University of San Diego

== Friendlies ==
July 22, 2007	LA Galaxy	0–1	Chelsea	Carson
19:30 PDT		Report	Terry 48'	Stadium: Home Depot Center; Attendance: 27,000; Referee: Brian Hall

7 November 2007	Vancouver Whitecaps	0–0	LA Galaxy	Vancouver
		Report		Stadium: BC Place; Attendance: 48,172

11 November 2007	Minnesota Thunder	v	LA Galaxy	Minneapolis
				Stadium: Humphrey Metrodome; Attendance: 20,123

27 November 2007	Sydney FC	5–3	LA Galaxy	Sydney
	Brosque 5', 25'; Zadkovich 29'; Middleby (yellow card) 49', (goal) 53'; Biddle (yellow card) 76'; Fyfe 87'	Report	Harmse (yellow card) 31' (yellow-red card) 76'; Beckham 45', (yellow card) 64'; Buddle 49'; Donovan 90'	Stadium: Telstra Stadium; Attendance: 80,295; Referee: Mark Shield

== Competitive ==
=== Major League Soccer ===
April 8, 2007 1	Houston Dynamo	0–0	LA Galaxy	Houston
16:00 PDT				Stadium: Robertson Stadium

April 12, 2007 2	LA Galaxy	1–2	FC Dallas	Carson
19:00 PDT				Stadium: Home Depot Center

April 28, 2007 3	LA Galaxy	3–1	Chivas USA	Carson
19:30 PDT				Stadium: Home Depot Center

May 12, 2007 4	LA Galaxy	2–3	New England Revolution	Carson
19:30 PDT				Stadium: Home Depot Center

May 20, 2007 5	Chivas USA	1–1	LA Galaxy	Carson
19:30 PDT				Stadium: Home Depot Center

May 26, 2007 6	Colorado Rapids	1–0	LA Galaxy	Commerce City
17:30 PDT				Stadium: DSG Park

June 2, 2007 7	LA Galaxy	0–0	D.C. United	Carson
19:30 PDT				Stadium: Home Depot Center

June 9, 2007 8	FC Dallas	3–1	LA Galaxy	Frisco
19:30 PDT				Stadium: Pizza Hut Park

June 17, 2007 9	LA Galaxy	3–2	Real Salt Lake	Carson
19:30 PDT				Stadium: Home Depot Center

June 23, 2007 10	LA Galaxy	2–3	Columbus Crew	Carson
19:30 PDT				Stadium: Home Depot Center

July 4, 2007 11	LA Galaxy	2–0	Chicago Fire	Carson
19:30 PDT				Stadium: Home Depot Center

July 8, 2007 12	LA Galaxy	2–2	Kansas City Wizards	Carson
19:30 PDT				Stadium: Home Depot Center

August 5, 2007 13	Toronto FC	0–0	LA Galaxy	Toronto
16:30 PDT				Stadium: BMO Field

August 9, 2007 14	D.C. United	1–0	LA Galaxy	Washington, D.C.
16:00 PDT				Stadium: RFK Stadium

August 12, 2007 15	New England Revolution	1–0	LA Galaxy	Foxborough
16:00 PDT				Stadium: Gillette Stadium

August 18, 2007 16	New York Red Bulls	5–4	LA Galaxy	East Rutherford
16:30 PDT				Stadium: Giants Stadium

August 23, 2007 17	LA Galaxy	0–3	Chivas USA	Carson
19:30 PDT				Stadium: Home Depot Center

August 26, 2007 18	Colorado Rapids	3–0	LA Galaxy	Commerce City
16:30 PDT				Stadium: DSG Park

September 1, 2007 19	LA Galaxy	1–2	Real Salt Lake	Carson
19:30 PDT				Stadium: Home Depot Center

September 8, 2007 20	LA Galaxy	3–1	Colorado Rapids	Carson
19:30 PDT				Stadium: Home Depot Center

=== U.S. Open Cup ===
July 10, 2007 Third round	Richmond Kickers (Virginia)	1–0	(California) LA Galaxy	Richmond
19:30 PDT	Bulow 29'; Alexander (yellow card) 87'	Report	Harden (yellow card) 27'; Gordon (yellow card) 49'	Stadium: City Stadium; Attendance: 4,578; Referee: Andrew Chapin

=== SuperLiga ===
==== Group stage ====
July 24, 2007 1	LA Galaxy (United States)	2–1	(Mexico) Pachuca	Carson
19:30 PDT	Gordon 50'; Donovan 81'	Report	Márquez Lugo 78'	Stadium: Home Depot Center; Attendance: 19,317; Referee: Carlos Batres (Guatemala)

July 28, 2007 2	LA Galaxy (United States)	1–2	(Mexico) Guadalajara	Los Angeles
19:30 PDT	Donovan 88'	Report	Rodríguez 59'; Bravo 82'	Stadium: Los Angeles Memorial Coliseum; Attendance: 37,337; Referee: Courtney Campbell (Jamaica)

July 31, 2007 3	FC Dallas (United States)	5–6	(United States) LA Galaxy	Frisco
17:00 PDT	Alvarez 43'; Toja 78'; Alvarez 82'; Ruíz 90+1'; Thompson 90+6'	Report	Gordon 3'; Klein 12'; Gordon 15'; Harmse 18'; Donovan 84'; Pavón 90+5'	Stadium: Pizza Hut Park; Attendance: 21,576; Referee: Kevin Stott (United States)

==== Knockout round ====
August 15, 2007 Semifinals	LA Galaxy (United States)	2–0	(United States) D.C. United	Carson
20:00 EDT	Beckham 27'; Donovan 47'	Report		Stadium: Home Depot Center; Attendance: 17,223; Referee: Alex Prus (United States)

August 29, 2007 Final	LA Galaxy (United States)	1–1 (a.e.t.) (3–4 p)	(Mexico) Pachuca	Carson
20:00 PDT	Klein 90+3'	Report	Vagenas 29' (o.g.)	Stadium: Home Depot Center; Attendance: 12,500; Referee: Carlos Batres (Guatemala)
	Penalties
	Vagenas (penalty missed); Jones (penalty scored); Klein (penalty scored); Buddle (penalty scored); Donovan (penalty missed); Xavier (penalty missed)		(penalty scored) Lugo; (penalty scored) Rey; (penalty missed) Caballero; (penalty scored) Manzur; (penalty missed) Cabrera; (penalty scored) Rodríguez

== Transfers ==
=== In ===
No.	Pos.	Player	Transferred from	Fee/notes	Date	Source
1	GK	(United States) Joe Cannon	(United States) Colorado Rapids	Traded for Herculez Gomez and Ugo Ihemelu	December 1, 2006	
35	GK	(United States) Lance Friesz	(United States) Los Angeles Storm	Free	January 1, 2007	
	FW	(United States) Robbie Findley	(United States) Oregon State Beavers	2007 MLS SuperDraft, R2 P16	January 12, 2007	
19	DF	(United States) Josh Tudela	(United States) Indiana Hoosiers	2007 MLS SuperDraft, R2 P20	January 12, 2007	
3	DF	(United States) Ty Harden	(United States) Washington Huskies	2007 MLS SuperDraft, R2 P23	January 12, 2007	
	GK	(United States) Tally Hall	(United States) San Diego State Aztecs	2007 MLS SuperDraft, R4 P44	January 12, 2007	
	DF	(United States) Bobby Burling	(United States) Loyola Marymount Lions	2007 MLS SuperDraft, R4 P45	January 12, 2007	
6	MF	(South Africa) Kevin Harmse	(Slovakia) Nitra	Undisclosed	April 2, 2007	
17	DF	(Portugal) Abel Xavier	(England) Middlesbrough	Undisclosed	May 14, 2007	
22	DF	(United States) Kelly Gray	(United States) Houston Dynamo	Trade for Nate Jaqua	June 28, 2007	
23	MF	(England) David Beckham	(Spain) Real Madrid	Free	July 11, 2007	
11	FW	(Sierra Leone) Israel Sesay	(United States) IMG Academy	Weighted lottery	August 1, 2007	

=== Draft picks ===
2007 LA Galaxy Draft
Round	Selection	Player	Pos.	College
2	16	Robbie Findley	Forward	Oregon State
2	20	Josh Tudela	Midfielder	Indiana
2	23	Ty Harden	Defender	Washington
4	44	Tally Hall	Goalkeeper	San Diego State
4	45	Bobby Burling	Defender	Loyola Marymount
