= Colorado Springs Blizzard =

American soccer team

- Full name: Colorado Springs Blizzard
- Nickname: The Blizzard
- Founded: 2004
- Dissolved: 2006
- Ground: Sand Creek Stadium
- Chairman: (United States) Bill Arbogast
- Manager: (United States) John Wells
- League: USL Premier Development League
- 2006: 6th, Heartland Division
| Home colours | Away colours |

Colorado Springs Blizzard were an American soccer team, founded in 2004. The team was a member of the United Soccer Leagues Premier Development League (PDL), the fourth tier of the American Soccer Pyramid, until 2006, when the team left the league and the franchise was terminated.

The Blizzard played their home games at Sand Creek Stadium in the city of Colorado Springs, Colorado and also in the stadium at Harrison High School, also in Colorado Springs. The team's colors were red and white.

== Final squad ==
vs Kansas City Brass, 23 July 2006 Note: Flags indicate national team as defined under FIFA eligibility rules; some limited exceptions apply. Players may hold more than one non-FIFA nationality.

| No. | Pos. | Nation | Player |
|---|---|---|---|
| 0 | GK | USA | Mike Muravez |
| 3 | MF | USA | Bobby Woods |
| 5 | MF | USA | Michael Glass |
| 6 | DF | USA | Chad Wheat |
| 7 | DF | USA | Peter Randall |
| 8 | FW | USA | Ryan Regrutto |
| 9 | FW | USA | Joel Trainer |

| No. | Pos. | Nation | Player |
|---|---|---|---|
| 10 | FW | USA | Craig Miller |
| 11 | DF | USA | Kelly Robinson |
| 13 | FW | USA | Marcus Reynolds |
| 14 | DF | USA | Garrett Maloney |
| 17 | MF | USA | Clayton Zelin |
| 18 | MF | USA | Brian Contreras |
| 19 | MF | USA | James Wade |

== Year-by-year ==
| Year | Division | League | Regular season | Playoffs | Open Cup |
|---|---|---|---|---|---|
| 2004 | 4 | USL PDL | 7th, Heartland | Did not qualify | Did not qualify |
| 2005 | 4 | USL PDL | 6th, Heartland | Did not qualify | Did not qualify |
| 2006 | 4 | USL PDL | 6th, Heartland | Did not qualify | Did not qualify |

== Competition history ==
Blizzard entered the PDL as an expansion franchise in 2004 as the third team from the Pikes Peak area to play in the league, following the runs of the Colorado Springs Stampede (1995–2000) and Colorado Springs Ascent (2001). Under owner/head coach Bill Arbogast Blizzard's first season in competition began strongly with back-to-back wins in their first two games, 4–0 over Kansas City Brass and 4–3 over state rivals Boulder Rapids Reserve, with Sean McGinnis and Daniel Wasson finding the net. This was as good as the season got, as they struggled to find consistency thereafter. They remained potent in front of goal throughout the year – they beat St. Louis Strikers 5–3 (with McGinnis scoring a hat trick), overpowered Sioux Falls Spitfire 4–1 in mid-June, and enjoyed an excellent 5–0 win on the road in St. Louis in July. This was counteracted by several heavy defeats, including a 6–2 hammering by BYU Cougars, a 4–1 defeat to Boulder Rapids Reserve, a 4–0 thrashing on the road at the El Paso Patriots, and two 3–0 losses on the end of season run in. Blizzard finished their first campaign 7th in the Heartland Division, 35 points adrift of divisional champions Chicago Fire Premier.

The 2005 season was a struggle for Blizzard; they dropped their opening three games of the season by significant margins, and left it late to pick up their first win 3–1 at home to Sioux Falls Spitfire at the end of May. However, this victory did not signal a turnaround in fortunes: they lost five of their next six games, beating expansion side Springfield Storm 3–1, but suffering heavy defeats to El Paso Patriots (3–0), Boulder Rapids Reserve (5–1) and BYU Cougars (6–2). Blizzard's fourth and final win of the season came at home in mid-July with a 3–1 victory over Kansas City Brass, but slumped to four consecutive losses in their final four games, including a 6–1 demolition by Boulder Rapids Reserve, and a humiliating 5–0 defeat by Des Moines Menace on the last day of the season. They finished the year 6th in the Heartland Division, 26 points off the leaders and just three points off the basement. Top scorer Ryan Regrutto did manage to hit 5 goals, while Craig Miller contributed 3 assists.

John Wells was brought in as head coach for the 2006 season. The team won just three games all season—3–0 over Sioux Falls Spitfire in mid-June, 4–3 over expansion franchise Ogden Outlaws in early July, and 2–0 over fellow Utah team BYU Cougars. This was as good as it got for Blizzard: most of the rest of the season was spent enduring a series of heavy defeats, including a 4–1 thrashing at home by Des Moines Menace, a 6–1 demolition at the hands of Colorado Rapids U23's, a 3–1 loss on the road in Sioux Falls, and a 1–0 loss to Kansas City Brass on the final day of the season in what turned out to be the franchise's last ever game. Blizzard finished 2006 6th in the Heartland Division for the second consecutive year, three points ahead of Thunder Bay Chill, but 30 behind divisional champions Colorado. Joel Trainer was Blizzard's top scorer, with 7 goals, while Ryan Regrutto and Craig Miller both contributed 3 assists. Following the conclusion of the 2006 season the club folded, and left the PDL. The Blizzards season was capped off by a 2 win road trip in Utah which is a tuff Road Trip and getting 2 wins on the Road the same weekend in the PDL is rare. The Road trip was on the heels of a Wednesday night match with the Colorado Rapids at Sand Creek Stadium. Coach Fernando Clavijo and John Murphy arrived with the Rapids to play in front of a crowd of about 2,000 to watch the Blizzard come away with a 3–2 win which would prove to be the highlight of the Blizzards 2006 season.

== Coaches ==
- (United States) Bill Arbogast 2004–05
- (United States) John Wells 2006

== Stadia ==
- Washburn Field, Colorado Springs, Colorado 2004–05
- Sand Creek Stadium, Colorado Springs, Colorado 2005–06
- Stadium at Harrison High School, Colorado Springs, Colorado 2006 (2 games)

== Average attendance ==
- 2006: 219
- 2005: 752
