= Springfield Storm =

- Full name: Springfield Storm
- Nickname: The Storm
- Founded: 2005
- Ground: Harrison Stadium
- Chairman: (United States) Doug Fiester
- Manager: (United States) Chris Hanlon
- League: USL Premier Development League
- 2005: 5th, Heartland Division
Home colours	Away colours

The Springfield Storm was an American soccer team which played in the United Soccer Leagues Premier Development League (PDL), the fourth tier of the American Soccer Pyramid in 2005. After its inaugural season, the franchise was sold and relocated to Glendora, California to become the Los Angeles Storm.

They played their home games primarily at Harrison Stadium on the campus of Drury University in Springfield, Missouri, but also occasionally played at Cooper Field, also in Springfield. The team's colors were white, blue and yellow.

== Year-by-year ==
Year	Division	League	Regular season	Playoffs	Open Cup
2005	4	USL PDL	5th, Heartland	Did not qualify	Did not qualify

== Competition history ==
The Springfield Storm were formed by local businessmen Chris Hanlon and Doug Fiester and former professional players Armen Tonianse and Brett Thomas, and entered the PDL in 2005. Playing out of Harrison Stadium on the campus of Drury University, the Storm enjoyed a fairly decent year of competition. They tied their first competitive game 1–1 with Des Moines Menace, and beat Colorado Springs Blizzard 3–0 in their second. As the year progressed, Storm registered a couple of impressive victories, including a 3–0 home victory over Nashville Metros and a 4–2 come-from-behind won over the other team from Tennessee, Memphis Express. Unfortunately, Storm's defence was overly-leaky; on five occasions the Storm conceded four or more goals, including a pair of 5–0 and 5–1 losses to Boulder Rapids Reserve in June, and two six-goal losses to Kansas City Brass in final two games. Storm finished the season fifth in the heartland, out of the playoffs; Mike Myers was the season's top scorer, with 4 goals, while Nick Bohnenkamp registered 4 assists. At the end of the season the ownership group sold the franchise to investors in Glendora, California, where it moved to become Los Angeles Storm.

== Coaches ==
- (United States) Chris Hanlon, 2005
- (United States) Tyler Linn, Assistant Coach, Reserves Head Coach 2005

== Stadia ==
- Harrison Stadium, Springfield, Missouri 2005
- Cooper Field, Springfield, Missouri 2005 (3 games)

== See also ==
- Springfield Demize
