= Ryan Pierce =

Ryan Pierce may refer to:

- Ryan Pierce (The West Wing), a character on The West Wing
- Ryan Pierce (soccer) (born 1983), American soccer player
