= Victoria Challenge Cup =

- Founded: 2009
- Abolished: 2009
- Region: Canada (CONCACAF)
- Number of teams: 4
- Television broadcasters: Rogers TV

The Victoria Challenge Cup was a pre-season competition between the 4 USL Premier Development League clubs from Ontario, Canada. The inaugural event took place on the Victoria Day weekend of May 15 to 17, 2009 at the Algonquin Soccer Complex in Ottawa, Ontario.

== Background ==
The establishment of Forest City London prior to the 2009 Premier Development League season brought the number of PDL teams in Ontario to four. With American PDL sides starting their season earlier than their Canadian counterparts in order to take part in US Open Cup qualifying, the Canadian PDL teams decided to establish the Victoria Challenge Cup. As of 2009, the Victoria Challenge Cup does not act as qualifying for the Canadian equivalent to the US Open Cup, the Canadian Championship.

The tournament did not take place in 2010 and has lapsed since then.

== Participating teams ==
- Toronto Lynx
- Ottawa Fury
- Thunder Bay Chill
- Forest City London

== Format ==
In 2009, the four competing clubs played a round robin tournament in Ottawa. Toronto Lynx and Forest City London did not play each other in Ottawa, but their PDL regular season match completed the tournament schedule.

== Past winners ==
| Year | Rank | Teams | Pts | Pld | W | D | L | GF | GA | GD |
|---|---|---|---|---|---|---|---|---|---|---|
| 2009 | 1 | Thunder Bay Chill | 9 | 3 | 3 | 0 | 0 | 6 | 2 | +4 |
| 2009 | 2 | Ottawa Fury | 4 | 3 | 1 | 1 | 1 | 3 | 3 | 0 |
| 2009 | 3 | Toronto Lynx | 2 | 3 | 0 | 2 | 1 | 2 | 4 | -2 |
| 2009 | 4 | Forest City London | 1 | 3 | 0 | 1 | 2 | 2 | 4 | -2 |

== 2009 Results ==
| 15 May 2009 | Thunder Bay Chill | 2 - 1 | Ottawa Fury | Algonquin College Soccer Complex; Ottawa, ON |
| 7:30 pm |

| 16 May 2009 | Forest City London | 1 - 2 | Thunder Bay Chill | Algonquin College Soccer Complex; Ottawa, ON |
| 3:00 pm |

| 16 May 2009 | Toronto Lynx | 1 - 1 | Ottawa Fury | Algonquin College Soccer Complex; Ottawa, ON |
| 6:00pm | 1 | | 1 |

| 17 May 2009 | Forest City London | 0 - 1 | Ottawa Fury | Algonquin College Soccer Complex; Ottawa, ON |
| 2:00 pm |

| 17 May 2009 | Thunder Bay Chill | 2 - 0 | Toronto Lynx | Algonquin College Soccer Complex; Ottawa, ON |
| 5:00 pm | 2 | | 0 |

| 3 June 2009 | Toronto Lynx | 1 - 1 | Forest City London | Ontario Soccer Centre; Vaughan, ON |
| 11:00 am | 57' Jordan Webb | Soccer in Toronto Report | 45' Kevin Zimmerman | Attendance: 1,000 |
