= Colin Burns =

American soccer player (born 1982)

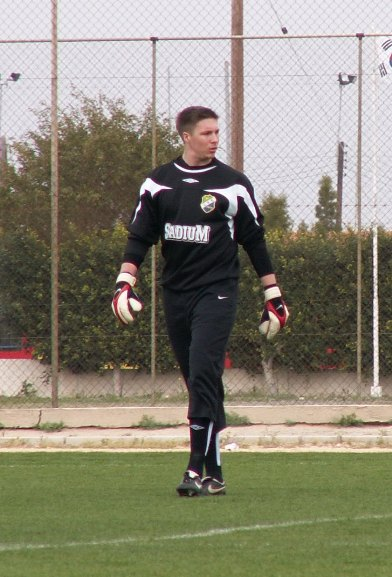

Personal information
- Full name: Colin William Burns
- Date of birth: June 30, 1982 (age 44)
- Place of birth: Newark, Delaware, U.S.
- Height: 6 ft 3 in (1.91 m)
- Position: Goalkeeper

College career
Years	Team	Apps	(Gls)
2000–2004	UMass Minutemen		

Senior career*
Years	Team	Apps	(Gls)
2003–2004	Albany Blackwatch Highlanders		
2006	Delaware Dynasty	10	(0)
2006	FC Olimpia Bălţi	8	(0)
2007	Sepsi-78	18	(0)
2007	Kokkolan Palloveikot	8	(0)
2008–2009	Ljungskile SK	28	(0)
2010–2011	Sarpsborg 08 FF	0	(0)
2011	Sandefjord Fotball	1	(0)
- * Club domestic league appearances and goals as of January 27, 2011

Colin Burns (born June 30, 1982) is a retired American soccer goalkeeper who last played for Sandefjord Fotball.

== Club career ==
=== Early career ===
Colin grew up in Newark, Delaware and played his youth soccer with the Kirkwood Soccer Club. Burns also played in the Delaware Olympic Development Program (ODP) from 1994 to 2001. While playing for Delaware ODP, he was selected to the Region one team from 2000 to 2001 traveling with them to tournaments in France, the Netherlands and Switzerland. Burns played college soccer at the University of Massachusetts Amherst.

He began his professional career with a training stint with Motherwell FC in July 2005. He then trained for five months with Scottish club, Partick Thistle FC, from July to November 2005. He had trouble obtaining a work permit in Scotland so he left in November 2005 and returned to the U.S. Later on, he also had a training stint with French club Troyes AC.

=== Olimpia Bălţi ===
Burns returned to Europe in August 2006 to sign a one-year contract with FC Olimpia Bălţi in the Divizia Naţională, the top league in Moldova. He was named the first choice goalkeeper shortly after arriving in Balti. Colin made his professional debut against FC Dacia Chişinău in Stadionul Republican on September 9, 2006. Olimpia lost 1–0 in his debut but Burns was named man of the match for his efforts in the game.

Burns played for eight matches for Olimpia before canceling his contract during the winter break due to the financial crisis of the club. Much of the football media regarded Burns as one of the top goalkeepers in the league during his short stay in Moldova.

=== Sepsi-78 ===
From Moldova, Burns joined Sepsi-78 in the Kakkonen in Seinäjoki, Finland. He would appear for Sepsi in 18 matches from April to August 2007. Burns picked up eight clean sheets and three Man of the Match honors while playing for Sepsi. He also helped Sepsi to a 1–0 win over local city rival TP-Seinäjoki. This was the first time Sepsi had beaten TP in thirteen years.

Because of Colin's form, Sepsi was getting interest from many clubs around Finland wanting to buy him for the remainder of the season. Burns was sold to Kokkolan Palloveikot (KPV) in the ykkonen in August 2007.

=== Kokkolan Palloveikot ===
Burns agreed to a short-term contract with Kokkolan Palloveikot that would keep him there till the end of the season. He played in eight matches for KPV picking up one clean sheet and named Man of the Match once, ultimately helping them avoid a late season relegation from the ykkonen. Burns gained his Man of the Match honors against Tampereen Pallo-Veikot (TPV), in only his fourth match with KPV, in a 1–0 win. After the match, TPV head coach, Mikko Purola, was quoted in a local Tampere newspaper as saying, "This game showed that Burns is the best goalkeeper in the league."

=== Ljungskile SK ===
Burns signed a two-year contract with Allsvenskan side Ljungskile SK (LSK) in February 2008.

His transfer was about to collapse because of a dispute with the Swedish Football Association over his registration. This is due to Burns having played for two clubs in the period from July 1, 2007, to June 30, 2008, under previous FIFA guidelines, he was not eligible to play for a third club during that period. FIFA changed their rules in December 2007 so that the period from July 1 to June 30 was no longer relevant. Under new regulations, the period is defined as the first game of the season to the last game of the season making Burns eligible to play for LSK. The Swedish Football Association had not adopted the new FIFA regulations and so they initially blocked his transfer. Legal action and pressure from the Swedish media, encouraged the Swedish FA to change their rules to comply with FIFA. This rule change has come to be known as the 'Burns Rule' by Swedish media.

Burns made his Allsvenskan debut on April 21, 2008, in a 2–1 win over Trelleborgs FF. He came on in the 90th minute for red-carded goalkeeper Michal Slawuta. He went on to play the final seven minutes in added time, making one save, and gaining his first league shutout.

Burns made his starting debut in the next match against 2007 Allsvenskan Champions, IFK Gothenburg on April 25. Ljungskile went on to win the match 2–1 in front of a record home crowd of 7,100 people thereby ending Gothenburg's stretch of nineteen unbeaten games started in the 2007 season. Burns was voted as one of the top three players of the match for his efforts in the game.

Burns took over the starting goalkeeping duties for the remainder of the season on August 17, playing away to Henrik Larsson and Helsingborgs IF. Ljungskile won the match 1–0, giving Helsingborgs their only home loss of the season. Colin was named as one of the men of match and also was named best goalkeeper of the week in the Allsvenskan on the weekly highlight show "Fotbollsmåndag" – Football Monday.

Burns went on to appear seventeen times for LSK gaining four man of the match honors, two top three players in the match and six shutouts in his first season in the Allsvenskan.

=== Sarpsborg 08 FF ===
Burns signed a two-year contract with Sarpsborg 08 FF in October 2009.

=== Sandefjord Fotball ===
Burns signed a one-year contract with Sandefjord Fotball in January 2011.
