= Casey Bartlett-Scott =

English professional footballer

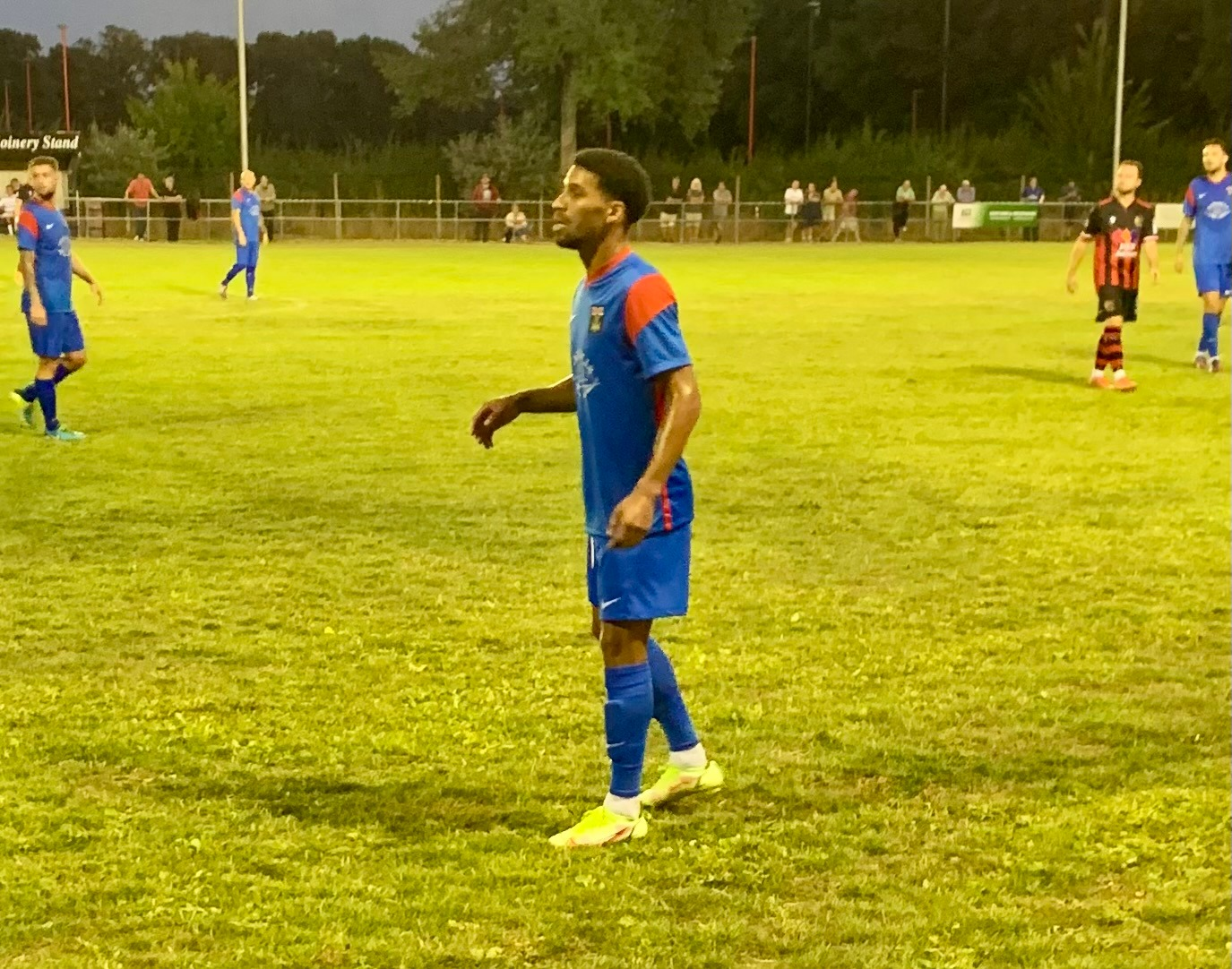

Personal information
- Full name: Casey Dion Bartlett-Scott
- Date of birth: November 11, 1994 (age 31)
- Place of birth: Portsmouth, England
- Height: 1.80 m (5 ft 11 in)
- Position: Defender

Team information
- Current team: Bognor Regis Town

College career
Years	Team	Apps	(Gls)
2015–2016	St. Louis Archers	42	(13)
2017–2019	Columbia Cougars	38	(2)

Senior career*
Years	Team	Apps	(Gls)
2017	Saint Louis FC U23	8	(1)
2018	Erie Commodores	11	(2)
2020–2021	Fareham Town	10	(3)
2021	Pittsburgh Riverhounds	1	(0)
2021–2023	Fareham Town	43	(2)
2023–2024	Baffins Milton Rovers	35	(2)
2024–2025	Horndean	36	(1)
2025	Fareham Town	15	(1)
2025–	Bognor Regis Town	8	(0)
- * Club domestic league appearances and goals as of 10:33, 21 January 2026 (UTC)

Casey Dion Bartlett-Scott (born 11 November 1994) is an English semi-professional footballer who plays as a defender for Bognor Regis Town.

== Career ==
=== College ===
In 2015, Bartlett-Scott moved to the United States to play college soccer at St. Louis Community College. In two seasons with the Archers, Bartlett-Scott made 42 appearances, scoring 13 goals and tallying 18 assists. In 2017, he transferred to Columbia College, playing a further two seasons in 2017 and 2019, making 38 appearances, scoring two goals and notching three assists for the Cougars. In 2017, Bartlett-Scott was named an All-AMC Defender, and in 2019 was named First Team All-Conference and NAIA First Team All-America.

=== Amateur ===
Whilst at college, Bartlett-Scott spent time with USL PDL side Saint Louis FC U23, scoring a single goal in eight appearances. 2018 saw him compete with NPSL side Erie Commodores, who he helped win the East Conference.

Following college, Bartlett-Scott had been set to complete with Chicago FC United in the PDL, now named the USL League Two. He instead returned to England and played with 9th-tier side Fareham Town in the Wessex Football League until the season was cancelled due to the COVID-19 pandemic.

=== Professional ===
On 18 March 2021, Barlett-Scott signed a professional contract with USL Championship side Pittsburgh Riverhounds. He made his professional debut on 11 August 2021, appearing as an 83rd-minute substitute during a 3–2 loss against The Miami FC. Following the 2021 season, Bartlett-Scott's contract option was declined by Pittsburgh.

In December 2021, Bartlett-Scott rejoined Fareham Town.

In June 2023, Bartlett-Scott joined fellow Wessex League Premier Division side Baffins Milton Rovers.

The following season he spent with Horndean. On 1 July 2025, he rejoined Fareham Town. In December 2025, he joined Bognor Regis Town.
