= Adrian Dubois =

American soccer player

Personal information
- Full name: Adrian Dubois
- Date of birth: April 16, 1987 (age 39)
- Place of birth: Acworth, New Hampshire, United States
- Height: 6 ft 1 in (1.85 m)
- Position: Midfielder

Team information
- Current team: Vermont Catamounts

Youth career
- 2005–2008: New Hampshire Wildcats

Senior career*
Years	Team	Apps	(Gls)
2007	Albany Admirals	15	(0)
2008	New Hampshire Phantoms	15	(4)
2009	Western Mass Pioneers	20	(2)
2010–2011	New Hampshire Phantoms	14	(0)
2013	Los Angeles Blues	8	(0)
2016	New Hampshire Phantoms		

Managerial career
- 2014–2019: Saint Joseph Monks
- 2019–2023: Vermont Catamounts (assistant)
- 2023–2025: San Diego State Aztecs (assistant)
- 2026–: Vermont Catamounts
- * Club domestic league appearances and goals

Adrian Dubois (born April 16, 1987) is an American soccer coach and former player who is the current coach of NCAA Division I club Vermont Catamounts

== Career ==
=== College and amateur ===
Adrian Dubois attended Fall Mountain Regional High School in Langdon, New Hampshire, where he was a 2004 NSCAA/adidas High School Boys All-Region I (New England) selection. Dubois was also the Gatorade Player of the Year in his senior season, played college soccer at the University of New Hampshire, and spent two seasons in the USL Premier Development League with the Albany Admirals and the New Hampshire Phantoms.

=== Professional ===
Dubois turned professional in 2009 with the Western Mass Pioneers, and made his pro debut on April 25, 2009, in Western Mass's 3-1 opening day defeat to the Harrisburg City Islanders. He scored his first two career goals on June 5, 2009, in a 2–1 win over Crystal Palace Baltimore, and went on to play in 20 league games for the Pioneers, but was released at the end of the year when the Pioneers self-relegated to the PDL.

Having been unable to secure a professional contract elsewhere, Dubois returned to play for the New Hampshire Phantoms in the USL Premier Development League in 2010.

=== Coaching ===
Dubois was an assistant coach at UC San Diego from 2012 to 2013. From there, Dubois's next coaching job was with New England Futbal Club from August 2013 to August 2014. He was also on coaching staff of UMass Boston as an assistant coach for the same period.

He got his first head coach role at Saint Joseph Monks in Standish, Maine. In 2019, Dubois became an assistant coach for the Vermont Catamounts. While at Vermont, Dubois was ranked as one of the top 12 assistant coaches in the country by College Soccer News. Dubois joined the San Diego State Aztecs before the beginning of the 2023 collegiate season.

== Personal life ==
Dubois is married to Ali Dubois

== Education ==
Dubois received a degree in Biology from the University of New Hampshire in 2009 and an MBA from Saint Joseph's College of Maine in 2020.
