= Leon Sharf =

Ukrainian American soccer player

Personal information
- Birth name: Leonid Sharf
- Date of birth: July 5, 1982 (age 44)
- Place of birth: Ukrainian SSR (now Ukraine)
- Height: 1.73 m (5 ft 8 in)
- Position: Midfielder

Youth career
- 2002–2004: Northridge Matadors

Senior career*
Years	Team	Apps	(Gls)
2005–2005	Bakersfield Brigade	22	(3)
2006–2007	CS Tiligul-Tiras Tiraspol	12	(0)
2007–2008	FC Olimpia Bălţi	32	(0)
2013	Los Angeles Misioneros	2	(0)
- * Club domestic league appearances and goals as of 04:55, 7 July 2009 (UTC)

Leonid "Leon" Sharf (Note: Ukrainian: Леонід «Леон» Шарф, romanized: Leonid "Leon" Sharf) (born 5 July 1982) is a Ukrainian American professional association football player.

== Playing career ==
In 2009, Sharf was named to the national football side to represent the United States at the 2009 Maccabiah Games.

== Statistics ==
Club performance			League		Cup		League Cup		Continental		Total	
Season	Club	League	Apps	Goals	Apps	Goals	Apps	Goals	Apps	Goals	Apps	Goals
Moldova			League		Cup		League Cup		Continental		Total	
2006	CS Tiligul-Tiras Tiraspol	National Division	12	0	0	0	0	0	0	0	12	0
2007	FC Olimpia Bălţi	National Division	16	0	0	0	0	0	0	0	16	0
2007–2008	FC Olimpia Bălţi	National Division	16	0	0	0	0	0	0	0	16	0
Career total			-	-	-	-	-	-	-	-	-	-
