= Mike Heald =

American soccer player

Personal information
- Place of birth: United States
- Position: Midfielder

Youth career
- 1990–1993: University of Tampa

Senior career*
Years	Team	Apps	(Gls)
1994	New Orleans Riverboat Gamblers		
1994–1996	Brandon Braves (indoor)		
1995–1997	Tampa Bay Cyclones		
- * Club domestic league appearances and goals

Mike Heald is an American retired soccer midfielder who spent most of his career with professional teams in Florida.

== Youth ==
In 1990, Heald graduated from Bloomingdale High School where he was named All-State in each of his 3 years in high school. In 1990, Heald was named by Gatorade as the Player of the Year in Florida. He was also honored as the 1990 Jose A. Alvarez Hillsborough County Outstanding High School Soccer Player of the Year.

He attended the University of Tampa where he played on the men's soccer team from 1990 to 1993. While at UT, Heald was named to the U-20 National Soccer team in 1991 and 1992. He also was selected to attend the U.S. Olympic Festival for the South Region in 1991. In 1992, University of Tampa were the NCAA National Runners-up.

== Professional ==
In 1994, Heald played for the New Orleans Riverboat Gamblers of the USISL. In both 1993 and 1994, Heald played for the U.S. men's national 'B' team. In the fall of 1994, Heald joined the Brandon Braves for the USISL indoor season. He would return for the 1995-1996 indoor season as well. In May 1995, he signed with the Tampa Bay Cyclones. He played for them both in 1995 and in 1996. On February 2, 1997, the Tampa Bay Mutiny selected Heald in the third round (twenty-seventh overall) of the 1997 MLS Supplemental Draft.
