= Olawale Adelusimi =

Nigerian soccer defender

Personal information
- Full name: Olawale Adelusimi
- Date of birth: April 1, 1983 (age 43)
- Place of birth: Ondo City, Nigeria
- Height: 6 ft 1 in (1.85 m)
- Position: Defender

Youth career
- 2003–2004: Chandler-Gilbert Coyotes
- 2005–2006: Midwestern State Mustangs

Senior career*
Years	Team	Apps	(Gls)
2007–2008	Thunder Bay Chill	24	(0)
2009	Crystal Palace Baltimore	4	(0)
- * Club domestic league appearances and goals as of 11 October 2009

Olawale Adelusimi (born April 1, 1983) is a Nigerian soccer defender who played for Crystal Palace Baltimore in the USSF Second Division.

== Career ==
=== College and amateur ===
Adelusimi came from his native Nigeria to the United States in 2002. He played two years of college soccer at Chandler-Gilbert Community College in Arizona, where he was twice selected to the All-ACCAC 1st Team, twice selected to the All-West Region I 1st Team and was a 2004 All-American Honorable Mention Selection. He transferred to Midwestern State University in his junior year, and helped them the Southwest Soccer Conference championship.

During his college years he also played with Thunder Bay Chill in the USL Premier Development League, and was part of the Chill squad which won the 2008 PDL championship title.

=== Professional ===
Adelusimi signed with Crystal Palace Baltimore in 2009, and made his professional debut on May 15, 2009 in a game against Western Mass Pioneers. Crystal Palace Baltimore released him during the 2010 pre-season.

== Honors ==
Thunder Bay Chill

- USL Premier Development League: 2008
