= Leyrielton =

Brazilian footballer

Personal information
- Full name: Leyrielton Moura de Morais
- Date of birth: June 22, 1988 (age 38)
- Place of birth: Goiânia, Brazil
- Height: 1.71 m (5 ft 7 in)
- Position: Right-back

Youth career
- 2004–2005: Goiás

Senior career*
Years	Team	Apps	(Gls)
2006–2011	Goiás		
2008–2009	→ Grêmio Prudente (loan)		
2009	→ Juventude (loan)	3	(0)
2010	→ Trindade (loan)		
2011–	São Caetano		
2012	→ Oeste (loan)		
2012	→ Rio Claro (loan)		
2013	→ Rio Claro (loan)	23	(1)
2013–	→ Icasa (loan)	3	(0)
2016	Thunder Bay Chill	14	(0)
- * Club domestic league appearances and goals

Leyrielton Moura de Morais (June 22, 1988), or simply Leyrielton, is a Brazilian former professional footballer who played as a right-back. He spent the 2016 season with Thunder Bay of the USL PDL.

He made his professional debut for Goiás in a 1–0 away defeat to Fluminense in the Campeonato Brasileiro on April 22, 2006.
