= Mohammed Takiyudin =

Ghanaian-born midfielder (born 1991)

Personal information
- Full name: Mohammed Takiyudin (Takidinho)
- Date of birth: 26 June 1991 (age 35)
- Place of birth: Ghana
- Height: 1.64 m (5 ft 5 in)
- Positions: Midfielder; winger

Youth career
- State Envoys, Feyenoord Academy

Senior career*
Years	Team	Apps	(Gls)
2000–2007	Feyenoord Ghana		
2007–2008	Medeama SC	8	(2)
2008–2009	Gamba All Blacks	10	(0)
2010–2011	Arizona Western College	10	(7)
2012–2013	BKV Norrtälje	12	(5)
2013–	Los Angeles Misioneros	8	(2)

International career^{‡}
2007	Ghana U17	1	
- * Club domestic league appearances and goals as of 7 August 2000 ‡ National team caps and goals as of 7 August 2007

Mohammed Takiyudin (born 26 June 1991 in Ghana) is a Ghanaian-born midfielder, who plays for Los Angeles Misioneros in United States.

== Career ==
Takidinho started playing football at youth level in State Envoys and then moved to Feyenoord Ghana. He moved to Feyenoord in 2001 and played for the club 6 years from the under 12 to the senior team with success. In 2007-08 moved to Kessben FC that changed their name to Medeama SC and was invited to Ghana U17. He attend Arizona Western College and played for them. In 2012, he transferred to Sweden and plays for BKV Norrtälje. Then in 2013 he played for the Los Angeles Misioneros in the USA PDL.

== Honours ==
- Runner up Best Player in National U 15 Colts games 2002
- Best player in Tiel tournament Netherlands under 17 in 2004
- Best attacker in Koforidua in Ghana Milo inter schools for SSS in 2005
- Best player in Orange U 15 tournament in Cote d' voire Abidjan 2005
- Best player in the Ghana National Inter School soccer festival for SSS 2005
- Best player in Milo inter schools for SSS (2006).
- Called up for Black Starlets National U 17 Ghana 2007
- Second Team All Conference Nomination for Arizona Western College, United States

== Video Highlights ==
- Highlight reel on YouTube
