= Steve Freeman (soccer) =

American soccer player, coach, and team founder

Personal information
- Date of birth: April 6, 1975 (age 51)
- Place of birth: United States
- Position: Midfielder

Youth career
- 1992: Hartwick College
- 1993: Siena Saints
- 1994–1995: College of Saint Rose

Senior career*
Years	Team	Apps	(Gls)
1995–1998	Albany Alleycats		
1998–1999	Electric City Shockers (indoor)		
2003	Blackwatch Highlanders	12	

Managerial career
- 2007: Blackwatch Highlanders
- * Club domestic league appearances and goals

Steve Freeman is an American retired soccer midfielder who played, coached and founded a team in the USISL.

Freeman grew up in Tampa Florida where he played for Tampa Blackwatch Keelley as a youth player. He graduated from Bloomingdale High School. In 1992, Freeman began his collegiate career at Hartwick College. He then transferred to Siena College for one season before finishing his last two seasons at the College of Saint Rose in Florida. He graduated with a bachelor's degree in education. In 1995, Freeman joined the Albany Alleycats of the USISL Pro League. In 1998, Freeman signed with the Electric City Shockers of the Northeast Indoor Soccer League

In January 1997, Freeman founded the Albany Blackwatch as a youth club. In 2003, Blackwatch formed a USL Premier Development League team under the name of Blackwatch Highlanders. Freeman was the general manager and player that first season. In 2007, he coached the Highlanders. In 2008 and 2009, Blackwatch went on hiatus. When the team returned in 2010, Freeman was the team president.

Freeman also served to terms on the US Club Soccer National Board of Directors (2002–06, 2009–11).

In 2014, Freeman became the Head Soccer Coach at Christian Brothers Academy (Albany, New York).
