= Colin McCurdy =

Northern Irish footballer and manager

Personal information
- Full name: Colin Charles McCurdy
- Date of birth: 18 July 1954 (age 72)
- Place of birth: Belfast, Northern Ireland
- Height: 1.80 m (5 ft 11 in)
- Positions: Striker; defender

Senior career*
Years	Team	Apps	(Gls)
1973–1976	Linfield		
1975	→ Cliftonville (loan)		
1976–1977	Larne		
1977–1978	Fulham	1	(0)
1978–1979	Philadelphia Fury	19	(7)
1978–1979	→ Larne (loan)		
1979–1981	Linfield		
1981–1986	Crusaders		
1982	→ Northcote City (loan)		
1986–1990	Bangor		

International career
1980	Northern Ireland	1	(1)

Managerial career
- 1987: Bangor
- 2004–2006: Ottawa Fury
- 2009–2010: Bangor
- * Club domestic league appearances and goals

Colin Charles McCurdy (born 18 July 1954) is a Northern Irish former football player and manager.

== Playing career ==
Born in Belfast, McCurdy played as a striker for Linfield, Cliftonville, Larne, Fulham, the Philadelphia Fury, Crusaders, Northcote City and Bangor. He made his only appearance for the Northern Ireland national team in June 1980, coming on as a substitute in the 57th minute against Australia and scoring the winning goal.

== Coaching career ==
He later worked in various coaching and management roles at Bangor, Glenavon, the Irish FA, the Eastern Ontario District Soccer Association, and the Ottawa Fury.
