= Stuart van Doten =

Dutch footballer

Personal information
- Full name: Stuart Eduardo Gerold van Doten
- Date of birth: 24 December 1989 (age 36)
- Place of birth: Rotterdam, Netherlands
- Height: 1.74 m (5 ft 9 in)
- Position: Left-back

Youth career
- Excelsior Maassluis
- Feyenoord
- RBC
- 2008–2009: Dordrecht
- 2009–2010: DOTO

Senior career*
Years	Team	Apps	(Gls)
2010–2012	Rijsoord		
2012	Birkirkara	0	(0)
2013	Etar 1924	0	(0)
2013	Universitatea Cluj	4	(0)
2014	Thunder Bay Chill	14	(0)
2015	Witgoor Dessel	0	(0)
2015	Al Sahel	0	(0)
2015	Inter Leipzig	2	(0)
2016	Dutch Lions	15	(0)
Total		46	(0)
- * Club domestic league appearances and goals

Stuart Eduardo Gerold van Doten (born 24 December 1989) is a Dutch former footballer who played as a left-back.

== Career ==
Van Doten played for FC Dordrecht reserves in the 2008–09 season, then had some seasons in Dutch amateur football before moving abroad to play for Maltese outfit Birkirkara. He then had an injury-hit stint in Bulgaria with Etar 1924 before joining Romanian Liga I club FC Universitatea Cluj. He was dismissed by Uni after five rounds and moved to Canada to play for Thunder Bay Chill.

After winning the award Best Defensive Player 2014 In Canada, van Doten joined KFC Witgoor in Belgium in January 2015, but left them two weeks later before even playing one match and moved to Kuwait and signed a deal with Al Sahel Club on 28 January 2015. Due to mistakes in the required documents from Belgium, FIFA blocked the transfer. Van Doten would be eligible to play official games for his new club as from 1 July 2015. On 28 October 2016, Toronto FC invited Van Doten for a short trial and a medical test. During the second training session van Doten got tackled from behind and could not proceed the trial. He flew back to The Netherlands.

== Personal life ==
Van Doten is the cousin of former Heerenveen striker Luciano Slagveer.
