= Bloomingdale High School =

Bloomingdale Senior High School

Location
- 1700 East Bloomingdale Avenue; Valrico, Florida 33596; United States; 27°53′40″N 82°15′20″W

Information
- Type: Public high school
- Motto: Discover Tomorrow Today
- Established: 1987
- School district: Hillsborough County Public Schools
- Superintendent: Addison Davis
- CEEB code: 101778
- Principal: Marcos Rodriguez
- Teaching staff: 96.50 (FTE)
- Grades: 9-12
- Enrollment: 2,311 (2023-2024)
- Student to teacher ratio: 23.95
- Campus size: 78.87 acres (319,200 m^{2})
- Campus type: Suburban
- Colors: Red, White and Black
- Nickname: Bulls; Lady Bulls
- Rivals: Newsome High School; Riverview High School; Brandon High School
- Newspaper: The Crimson Times
- Yearbook: The Minotaur
- Feeder schools: Guy O. Burns Middle School
- Website: www.hillsboroughschools.org/o/bloomingdale

Bloomingdale Senior High School is a public high school located in Valrico, Florida, United States. Bloomingdale was established in 1987, three years after Gaither High School, and has its same architectural design. Bloomingdale's first graduating class was in 1989, since Hillborough County does not pull seniors from existing schools for new schools. The current principal is Marcos Rodriguez. The football stadium is named for the first principal, Charley Harris. The school colors are red and white with black trim.

== Athletics ==
Sports offered include golf, football, soccer, baseball, softball, wrestling, basketball, volleyball, lacrosse, swimming, flag football, cross country, tennis, and track and field. Ice hockey, and bowling are club sports. Boys' sports teams are called the Bloomingdale Bulls, and girls' sports teams are called the Bloomingdale Lady Bulls.

The boys soccer team won state championships in '93, '95, and '98.

The girls soccer team won a state title in 2001 and was state runner up in 1992.

The cheerleading squad won state championships in 2008 and 2009.

The softball team won the state championship in 1993 and 2014.

== Clubs and organizations ==
Bloomingdale Senior High School currently offers three types of clubs: special interest, academic/honor, and service.

== Notable alumni ==
- Erin Andrews (1996): Fox NFL sportscaster
- Beth Bauer (1999): LPGA Professional golfer
- Chad Bratzke (1989): former National Football League player (Indianapolis Colts)
- Mark Consuelos (1989): television soap opera star and husband of Live with Regis & Kelly star Kelly Ripa
- Steve Freeman (1991): professional soccer player and coach
- Funkghost (Alvin Augustus Harris) (1990): hip-hop artist/producer
- Matt Good (2000): guitarist/vocalist of From First To Last/Destroy Rebuild Until God Shows
- Agiye Hall (2021): American football wide receiver previously with the University of Alabama
- Mike Heald (1990): professional soccer player
- Debra Lafave (1998): child rapist
- Richie Martin (2012): MLB player for the Oakland Athletics
- Alissa Nutting: author and creative writing professor
- Brent Underwood (2005): entrepreneur, owner of Cerro Gordo Mines
- Brock Wilken (2020): MLB player for the Milwaukee Brewers
