= Dwayne Whylly =

Bahamian footballer (born 1986)

Personal information
- Full name: Dwayne Desmond Whylly Jr.
- Date of birth: 26 November 1986 (age 39)
- Place of birth: Nassau, Bahamas
- Height: 1.75 m (5 ft 9 in)
- Position: Goalkeeper

College career
Years	Team	Apps	(Gls)
2004–2007	Yale Bulldogs	14	(0)

Senior career*
Years	Team	Apps	(Gls)
2006	Albany Admirals	14	(0)
2008–2010	Oxford City Nomads		
2010–2011	Witney United	10	(0)
2011–2013	FC Le Parc		

International career^{‡}
2004–	Bahamas	18	(0)
- * Club domestic league appearances and goals as of 17 November 2019 ‡ National team caps and goals as of 7 December 2008

Dwayne Desmond Whylly Jr. (born 26 November 1986) is a Bahamian footballer who plays as a goalkeeper for the Bahamas national team.

== Education ==
- Yale University (2004–2008), at Yale he pledged Delta Kappa Epsilon
- Harris Manchester College, Oxford University, Law (2008–2010)

== Club career ==
He played for St. Georges School in Rhode Island before teaming up at Yale in 2004. In 2006, he played for Albany Admirals in the USL Premier Development League.

== International career ==
He played for the Bahamas national youth and U-23 teams.

Whylly made his debut for the senior Bahamas in a March 2004 World Cup qualification match against Dominica, aged 17. He had earned 14 caps by January 2018, six of them in World Cup qualification games.

== Personal life ==
Whylly works as an associate for a Finance and Legal firm in Nassau.
