= Lee Kouadio =

Ivorian footballer

Lee Kouadio-Tobey
Personal information
- Full name: Lee Stephane Kouadio-Tobey
- Date of birth: October 27, 1987 (age 39)
- Place of birth: Côte d'Ivoire
- Height: 5 ft 8 in (1.73 m)
- Position: Forward

College career
Years	Team	Apps	(Gls)
2005–2009	Vermont Catamounts		

Senior career*
Years	Team	Apps	(Gls)
2008	Cape Cod Crusaders	9	(0)
2010	Pittsburgh Riverhounds	14	(2)
2013	Apollon Kalamarias	6	(0)

Managerial career
- 2016: Central Arkansas Bears (asst.)
- * Club domestic league appearances and goals as of November 26, 2010

Lee Kouadio (born October 27, 1987) is an Ivorian former footballer who played for Pittsburgh Riverhounds in the USL Second Division.

== Career ==
=== College and amateur ===
Kouadio-Tobey moved from his native Côte d'Ivoire to the United States as a teenager, settling in Woodlyn, Pennsylvania. He played four years of college soccer at the University of Vermont, where he was named America East Striker of the Year and Rookie of the Year in his freshman year.

During his college years he also played with the Cape Cod Crusaders in the USL Premier Development League.

=== Professional ===
After briefly trialling with the Philadelphia Union and the NSC Minnesota Stars during the early part of 2010, during which he played in several pre-season scrimmages, Kouadio-Tobey signed with the Pittsburgh Riverhounds of the USL Second Division. He made his professional debut on May 14, 2010, in a game against the Charlotte Eagles. In 2013, Kouadio spent the season with Apollon Kalamarias, making six appearances.

=== Managerial career ===
In 2016, Kouadio joined the coaching staff at Central Arkansas as an assistant coach.

== Personal ==
Kouadio-Tobey became a naturalized United States citizen on September 17, 2009.
