= Ross Schunk =

American soccer player (born 1986)

Personal information
- Full name: Ross Schunk
- Date of birth: April 28, 1986 (age 40)
- Place of birth: Portland, Oregon, United States
- Height: 6 ft 2 in (1.88 m)
- Position: Forward

Youth career
- 2005–2008: Redlands Bulldogs

Senior career*
Years	Team	Apps	(Gls)
2007–2008	Los Angeles Legends	27	(15)
2009–2010	Colorado Rapids	3	(0)
2009	→ Real Maryland Monarchs (loan)	1	(0)
- * Club domestic league appearances and goals as of 30 October 2009

Ross Schunk (born April 28, 1986, in Portland, Oregon) is an American former soccer player who played as a forward.

== Career ==
=== College and amateur ===
Schunk attended Woodrow Wilson High School, where he acquired his skills under the training of Don Juan Mercado. At a young age, Ross was known for his outstanding crossbar and soccer-tennis skills. Although widely speculated, it's known by many living in southwest Portland, Schunk developed his skills from the founding members of Gabe Academy (Don Juan Mercado and Shiloh were two of the founding fathers, among others). Ross would spend summers in Gabriel Park getting hustled by Shiloh. Many credit this with his playful spirit and love for the game, because the games were always just that: fun. No collecting ever took place.

He played college soccer at the University of Redlands from 2005 to 2008. He led his team in goals, assists and points in his junior year in 2007, and was named to the All-Far West Third-Team, the All-West First-Team, the All-SCIAC First Team, and was a Second-Team All-American. He finished his college career as a two-time Southern California Intercollegiate Athletic Conference Player of the Year, and with 126 points, making him Redlands' all-time career points leader.

Schunk also played for the Los Angeles Legends in the USL Premier Development League where he was a prolific goalscorer, netting 15 times in 27 games during his two years with the team.

=== Professional ===
Schunk was the only NCAA Division III player invited to the 2009 MLS combine; he was drafted in the fourth round (47th overall) of the 2009 MLS SuperDraft by Colorado Rapids, and signed a professional contract on March 13, 2009.

He made his professional debut on April 7, 2009, in the Lamar Hunt U.S. Open Cup against Los Angeles Galaxy. He made his MLS debut on June 6, 2009, as a late substitute in a game against Real Salt Lake.

Schunk was also briefly sent on loan to USL Second Division club Real Maryland Monarchs in May 2009.

Schunk was waived by Colorado on 24 November 2010.
