= Saint Louis FC U23 =

- Full name: Saint Louis FC U23
- Founded: 2006; 20 years ago
- Dissolved: 2018
- Stadium: SLSG Collinsville; Collinsville, Illinois
- Capacity: 2,500
- Owner: SLSG Pro LLC
- League: Premier Development League
- 2017: 3rd, Heartland Division; Playoffs: DNQ
Home colors	Away colors

Saint Louis FC U23 were an American soccer team based in Fenton, Missouri, United States. Founded in 2006, the team played in the Premier Development League (PDL), now USL League Two, the fourth tier of the American Soccer Pyramid, in the Heartland Division of the Central Conference.

The team played its home games at the Cooper Sports Complex, where they had played since 2011. The team's colors are maroon and sky blue. Saint Louis FC purchased the team on May 16, 2016 and renamed Saint Louis FC U23. They were replaced by a new USL League Two expansion team, the St. Louis Scott Gallagher Soccer Club in 2021.

== History ==
The club was founded as the Springfield Demize out of the ashes of the old Springfield Storm franchise, which had relocated to Glendora, California to become Los Angeles Storm at the end of the 2006 season. The ownership group of the Storm franchise, which included local businessman Doug Fiester and former professional players Chris Hanlon, Armen Tonianse, and Brett Thomas, launched the new team in early 2007, and began play that year.

The club rebranded as Springfield Synergy FC for the 2015 season before its sale to Saint Louis FC in 2016. The club is no longer active and the last known results of their existence appear at the league's website.

The Springfield Demize have been resurrected as a new semi-professional/amateur franchise in the new Major Arena Soccer League 3 in 2020. The USL League Two announced a new club to fill the void left by the former club by welcoming the St. Louis Scott Gallagher Soccer Club in 2021.

== Players ==
=== Notable former players ===
This list of notable former players comprises players who went on to play professional soccer after playing for the team in the Premier Development League, or those who previously played professionally before joining the team.

- (Croatia) Nikola Katic
- (Pakistan) Kashif Siddiqi
- (United States) Jack Mathis
- (Panama) Manny Forbes
- (United States) Aedan Stanley
- (Malaysia) Wan Kuzain Wan Kamal

== Year-by-year ==
Year	Division	League	Regular season	Playoffs	Open Cup
2007	4	USL PDL	6th, Heartland	Did not qualify	Did not qualify
2008	4	USL PDL	6th, Heartland	Did not qualify	Did not qualify
2009	4	USL PDL	7th, Heartland	Did not qualify	Did not qualify
2010	4	USL PDL	6th, Heartland	Did not qualify	Did not qualify
2011	4	USL PDL	7th, Heartland	Did not qualify	Did not qualify
2012	4	USL PDL	4th, Heartland	Did not qualify	Did not qualify
2013	4	USL PDL	6th, Heartland	Did not qualify	Did not qualify
2014	4	USL PDL	4th, Heartland	Did not qualify	Did not qualify
2015	4	USL PDL	4th, Heartland	Did not qualify	Did not qualify
2016	4	USL PDL	4th, Mid South	Did not qualify	Did not qualify
2017	4	USL PDL	3rd, Heartland	Did not qualify	Did not qualify
2018	On Hiatus				

== Head coaches ==
- (United States) Armen Tonianse (2007-2008)
- (United States) Chris Hanlon (2009)
- (United States) Logan Hoffman (2010)
- (Peru) Julio Reyes (2011)
- (United States) Chris Hanlon (2012)
- (Canada) Sean Fraser (2013)
- (Republic of Ireland) Ian Henry (2014)
- (United States) Andrew Bordelon (2015)
- (United States) Kevin Stoll (2016–present)

== Stadia ==
- Cooper Sports Complex; Springfield, Missouri (2007-2009, 2011–present)
- Harrison Stadium at Drury University; Springfield, Missouri (2010)

== Average attendance ==
Attendance stats are calculated by averaging each team's self-reported home attendances from the historical match archive.

- 2007: 224
- 2008: 224
- 2009: 138
- 2010: 193
