= Ottawa Fury SC =

Former Canadian soccer team

Ottawa Fury
- Full name: Ottawa Fury Soccer Club
- Nickname: The Fury
- Founded: 2005
- Dissolved: 2013 (NASL 2014)
- Stadium: Algonquin College Soccer Complex; Ottawa, Ontario
- Capacity: 1,000
- Owner: John Pugh
- League: USL Premier Development League
- 2013: 1st, Northeast; Playoffs: Northeast Conference Finals
- Website: http://www.ottawafury.com
Home colours	Away colours

Ottawa Fury Soccer Club was a Canadian soccer team based in Ottawa, Ontario. The team played in the USL Premier Development League (PDL) from 2005 to 2013. The organization joined the North American Soccer League (NASL) as Ottawa Fury FC beginning in the 2014 season. The team's home stadium was the Algonquin College soccer complex; its colours were white, red and blue.

The Fury operated a women's soccer team, Ottawa Fury Women, in the USL W-League, a team in the USL's Super-20 League, a league for players 17 to 20 years of age run under the United Soccer Leagues umbrella, as well as multiple youth teams.

== History ==
Ottawa Fury entered the PDL in 2005, joining fellow Canadian teams Thunder Bay Chill and Abbotsford Rangers in the American-based competition. Under the leadership of head coach Colin McCurdy – a Northern Irish legend from his time at Belfast club Linfield – the Fury began brightly, beating Westchester Flames 3–0 in their opening fixture, and winning two of their next four, including a 5–3 victory at home over the Albany Admirals which featured a hat trick from Kevin Omokhua. Unfortunately, Ottawa could never quite string a run of results together; throughout the season, win would follow loss would follow win, although their points tally did keep them high in the standings all year long. A staggering 10–2 annihilation of Brooklyn Knights (which saw Francis Mavula net four goals) and an impressive 6–3 victory on the road over the Westchester Flames were the highlights of the rest of the regular season. A 4–3 defeat to Cape Cod Crusaders on the final day of the season left the Fury third in the Northeast behind Cape Cod, just out of the playoffs. Kevin Omokhua and Francis Mavula were a threatening strike force, netting 21 times between them, while Desmond Tachie contributed 7 goals and 7 assists.

Ottawa moved to the New England Division in 2006, and started the new season in decent form, with a win and two ties in their first three games. However, the Fury stuttered through June, losing 2–1 to Albany Admirals, and being beaten three times in thirteen days by the Cape Cod Crusaders. The 4–4 tie with Rhode Island Stingrays at the beginning of June, in which they threw away a 2-goal lead in the last 15 minutes, may have signalled a downturn in Fury's form, but to their credit they rallied towards the season's end. Ottawa won six of their last eight games, including a 3–0 revenge win over Rhode Island, but their late charge towards the playoffs was in vain; they finished the regular season second in the division, a full 20 points behind Cape Cod Crusaders, and failed to secure the post-season wild-card slot. Kevin Omokhua was again Ottawa's outstanding player in front of goal, with 11 for the season.

Head coach McCurdy left at the end of 2006, and he was replaced by Chris Roth; unfortunately, his first season at the helm was a difficult one, as Fury suffered their worst run of results in the franchise's history. Despite an opening tie with Cape Cod Crusaders and a 3–2 win over PDL new boys Long Island Rough Riders in their first two games, Fury suffered an immediate down-turn in form. Fury won just one game in June – 4–0 over Vermont Voltage – and quickly fell out of contention for playoff consideration. Five straight games without a win in July, and eight in total, sent the Fury to the bottom of the Northeast Division table, and only a 4–0 final day win over bottom side Rhode Island Stingrays kept the Canadians from finishing last in the division. Will Beaugé was Fury's top scorer, with six goals, while English midfielder Yan Klukowski contributed 4 assists.

Head coach Roth was replaced by Stephen O'Kane in the off-season, and seemed to have a positive effect on the squad. Ottawa bounded back spectacularly in 2008, enjoying what turned out to be the most successful – but ultimately frustrating – year in franchise history. Despite a rocky start in which they lost their opening two games, Fury responded with four wins in their next five games, including a 5–2 blowout over Vermont Voltage, a 4–1 rollover of Rhode Island Stingrays, and a comprehensive 3–0 win over Long Island Rough Riders. Ottawa's scintillating form continued throughout July, when they enjoyed a 9-game unbeaten run stretching back to the aforementioned Long Island game. Fury were powerhouses in front of goal – they crushed the Rhode Island Stingrays 5–0, and followed this up with a 7–0 annihilation of New Hampshire Phantoms, which saw seven different Fury players find the net. They entered their last game knowing that a win over Vermont would most likely give them the New England Division title over Cape Cod Crusaders; shockingly, they fell to a 3–0 defeat, and then were nudged out of the playoffs by Newark Ironbound Express, who finished second in the Northeast, and finished equal on points, but took the final playoff spot on head-to-head results. Will Beaugé and Florian Decamps were Fury's top scorers, with seven goals each, while Da Costa and Andrew Rigby both contributed four assists.

Assistant Coach Klaus Linnenbruegger stepped up to take over the helm of the Ottawa Fury PDL. Linnenbruegger, who played professionally with Bielefeld in Germany, successfully coached Fury Youth teams over the previous seven seasons and is a past head coach of the Ottawa Wizards. The long-time Fury coach replaced Steve Payne who left the club by mutual consent.

== NASL in 2014 ==
On June 20, 2011, the North American Soccer League (NASL) announced that Ottawa had been awarded an expansion team. The new team will be owned by the Ottawa Sports and Entertainment Group and play home games at Frank Clair Stadium at Lansdowne Park. On February 26, 2013, it was announced that the new team would be named Ottawa Fury FC and carry on the Ottawa Fury legacy.

== Year-by-year ==
Year	Division	League	Regular season	Playoffs	Open Canada Cup
2005	4	USL PDL	3rd, Northeast	Did not qualify	Did not participate
2006	4	USL PDL	2nd, New England	Did not qualify	Did not participate
2007	4	USL PDL	7th, Northeast	Did not qualify	Did not participate
2008	4	USL PDL	2nd, New England	Did not qualify	N/A
2009	4	USL PDL	1st, Northeast	Divisional Finals	N/A
2010	4	USL PDL	1st, Northeast	Conference Finals	N/A
2011	4	USL PDL	4th, Northeast	Did not qualify	N/A
2012	4	USL PDL	1st, Northeast	Conference Finals	N/A
2013	4	USL PDL	1st, Northeast	Conference Finals	N/A

== Honours ==
- USL PDL Northeast Division Champions (4): 2009, 2010, 2012, 2013

== Head coaches ==
- (Northern Ireland) Colin McCurdy (2005–2006)
- (Canada) Chris Roth (2007)
- (Canada) Stephen O'Kane (2008–2009)
- (Canada) Carl Valentine (2010)
- (England) Steve Payne (2011)
- (Germany) Klaus Linnenbruegger (2011)
- (Canada) Stephen O'Kane (2012–2013)

== Stadia ==
- Keith Harris Stadium; Ottawa, Ontario (2005–2007)
- Soccer Complex at Algonquin College; Ottawa, Ontario (2008–2013)

== Average attendance ==
Attendance stats are calculated by averaging each team's self-reported home attendances from the historical match archive.

- 2005: 322
- 2006: 259
- 2007: 260
- 2008: 330
- 2009: 383
- 2010: 379
- 2011: 220
- 2012: 188
- 2013: 256
