= Thunder Bay Chill =

Canadian soccer team

- Full name: Thunder Bay Chill Soccer Club
- Founded: 2000; 26 years ago
- Stadium: Chapples Park Stadium; Thunder Bay, Ontario
- Capacity: 2,000
- Owner: Thunder Bay Elite Soccer Inc.
- Head Coach: Tony Colistro
- League: Prairies Premier League
- 2026: 1st
- Website: thunderbaychill.com
Home colours

Thunder Bay Chill Soccer Club is a Canadian soccer team based in Thunder Bay, Ontario, Canada. Founded in 2000, the team plays in the Prairies Premier League, in the third tier of the Canadian soccer pyramid. The team played in USL League Two, the fourth tier of the United States soccer pyramid from 2000 to 2024.

The team plays its home games at Chapples Park Stadium. The team's colours are white and blue. The club also has a large youth program, with over 2000 youth players.

== History ==
The Thunder Bay Chill were established in 2000 by founder Tony Colistro. They played their first home match on May 27, 2000, against the Wisconsin Rebels, losing 4–0. In 2002, they were named the PDL Organization of the Year.

In 2007, the Chill won their first Heartland Division title. In 2008, the Chill became the first Canadian club to win the PDL National Championship, after the defeated the Laredo Heat in penalty kicks in the final. In 2009, the four Ontario-based PDL teams (Forest City London, Toronto Lynx, Ottawa Fury, and the Chill) created a pre-season round robin tournament called the Victoria Challenge Cup, with the Chill emerging as champions, after winning all three of their matches.

From 2007 to 2013, they won the Heartland Division six times in seven seasons (finishing 2nd in 2009), and qualified for the playoffs ten times in an eleven-year span from 2007 through 2017 (missing only in 2014), as part of a dominant stretch in their history which included a five-year period, where they did not suffer a home loss until 2014. In 2015, they moved their home stadium to Fort Williams Stadium, after splitting the past two seasons between the turf stadium and the natural grass field at Chapples Field. They finished as Central Conference Champions five time over this period, earning them trips to the playoffs Final Four. After their PDL Championship title in 2008, they advanced to the Championship final an additional three times in 2010, 2013, and 2017, but ultimately lost in the finals on each of those occasions.

In 2018, the Chill formed a partnership with English Premier League club West Ham United through Global Image Sports, who are West Ham's North American partnership mechanism.

In 2020, the Chill announced they would not play in the 2020 USL League Two season due to the COVID-19 pandemic, with the league later cancelling the entire season anyways. In 2021, the Chill once again withdrew from the league due to continuing travel restrictions associated with the pandemic (although the league did return to operate a season in 2021).

After a two-year hiatus due to the COVID-19 pandemic, the Chill returned to the league for the 2022 season, also marking their return to newly reconstructed Chapples Park, which previously served as their home field until 2014. The team won the Deep North Division in both 2023 and 2024. Their entry in the league in 2024 was uncertain with the league contemplating removing them, but following a vote of confidence from the other teams in the division, their entry was confirmed in January 2024 (however, the other Canadian franchise FC Manitoba was removed for 2024). In January 2025, it was announced that the club would not participate in the 2025 USL League Two season, due to a variety of reasons, including a weakened Canadian dollar, operational costs for transportation, accommodation, and meals, and league divisional alignments, with the hope of returning in 2026. They announced instead that the team would attempt to organize a competitive friendly schedule and possibly enter certain Cup competitions instead.

With the Prairies Premier League (PPL) announced in December of 2025, the Chill were revealed to be one of the clubs participating in the nascent league's first season, which is slated to kick off in May of 2026. The Chill's men's team won the inaugural PPL season but, unlike the champions of the other four semi-professional leagues associated with Premier Soccer Leagues Canada, were not invited to compete in the 2027 Canadian Championship.

== Coaching staff ==
As of 20 March 2026

Role	Name
Manager/First Team Coach	(Canada) Marco Colistro
Goalkeeping Coach	(Italy) Francesco Leuzzi

== Notable former players ==
The following players have either played at the professional or international level, either before or after playing for the PDL/USL2 team:

- (United States) Sola Abolaji
- (Nigeria) Olawale Adelusimi
- (Canada) Tyler Attardo
- (Spain) Roberto Casabella
- (Canada) Paul Craig
- (Jamaica) Shaun Francis
- (United States) Luis Gonzalez
- (United States) Matheau Hall
- (Wales) Chris Jones
- (Honduras) Angelo Kelly-Rosales
- (Japan) Kosuke Kimura
- (Italy) Luca Mastrantonio
- (Brazil) Leyrielton
- (Cameroon) Macdonald Niba
- (Canada) Felix N'sa
- (Nigeria) Sunny Omoregie
- (Australia) Mitchell Osmond
- (United States) Sean Reynolds
- (United States) Cesar Ruvalcaba
- (Saint Kitts and Nevis) Alain Sargeant
- (Liberia) Josiah Seton
- (Brazil) Sullivan Silva
- (Sweden) Axel Sjöberg
- (Spain) Sota
- (United States) Brandon Swartzendruber
- (Saint Kitts and Nevis) Zephaniah Thomas
- (Nigeria) Muslim Umar
- (Netherlands) Stuart van Doten
- (United States) Abraham Villon

== Year-by-year ==
Men's

Year	League	Record	Regular season	Playoffs	Canadian Championship	Ref.
2000	PDL	4–1–13	6th, Heartland (6)	did not qualify	Not held	
2001	PDL	6–1–13	4th, Heartland (5)	did not qualify	Not held	
2002	PDL	5–1–12	6th, Heartland (8)	did not qualify	Not held	
2003	PDL	10–1–7	3rd, Heartland (8)	did not qualify	Not held	
2004	PDL	11–0–7	4th, Heartland (10)	did not qualify	Not held	
2005	PDL	6–1–9	4th, Heartland (7)	did not qualify	Not held	
2006	PDL	2–3–11	7th, Heartland (7)	did not qualify	Not held	
2007	PDL	10–3–3	1st, Heartland (7)	Conference semifinals (R16)	Not held	
2008	PDL	13–1–2	1st, Heartland (6)	Champions	Not eligible	
2009	PDL	8–5–3	2nd, Heartland (7)	Divisional First Round (R32)	Not eligible	
2010	PDL	12–2–2	1st, Heartland (7)	National finals (F)	Not eligible	
2011	PDL	12–2–2	1st, Heartland (7)	National semifinals (SF)	Not eligible	
2012	PDL	13–1–2	1st, Heartland (7)	Conference semifinals (R16)	Not eligible	
2013	PDL	12–1–1	1st, Heartland (7)	National finals (F)	Not eligible	
2014	PDL	6–1–7	3rd, Heartland (6)	did not qualify	Not eligible	
2015	PDL	9–3–2	2nd, Heartland (6)	Conference semifinals (R16)	Not eligible	
2016	PDL	7–5–2	2nd, Heartland (6)	Conference semifinals (R16)	Not eligible	
2017	PDL	9–2–3	1st, Heartland (6)	National finals (F)	Not eligible	
2018	PDL	6–1–7	5th, Heartland (6)	did not qualify	Not eligible	
2019	USL2	6–2–6	3rd, Heartland (6)	did not qualify	Not eligible	
2020	USL2	season cancelled due to the COVID-19 pandemic			Not eligible	
2021	USL2	did not play due to COVID-19 pandemic travel restrictions			Not eligible	
2022	USL2	6–3–3	3rd, Deep North (6)	did not qualify	Not eligible	
2023	USL2	9–2–1	1st, Deep North (7)	Conference semifinals (R16)	Not eligible	
2024	USL2	8–1–3	1st, Deep North (6)	Conference quarterfinals (R32)	Not eligible	
2025	Did not compete					
2026	PPL	6–3–1	1st (6)	—N/a	Not eligible	

Women's

Year	League	Record	Regular season	Playoffs	W Canadian Championship	Reference
2026	PPL	4–4–2	2nd (6)	—N/a	did not qualify	

== Honours ==
- Premier Development League / USL League Two
  - National Champions: 2008
    - Finalists: 2010, 2013, 2017
  - Central Conference Champions: 2008, 2010, 2011, 2013, 2017
  - Heartland Division Champions: 2007, 2008, 2010, 2011, 2012, 2013, 2017
  - Deep North Champions: 2023, 2024
- Victoria Challenge Cup
  - Champions: 2009
- Prairies Premier League
  - Champions: 2026

== Head coaches ==
- Marco Colistro (2026-Present)
- (Canada) Tony Colistro (2000–2014, 2023–2024, 2026–present)
- (Italy) Giovanni Petraglia (2015–2022)

== Stadiums ==
- Chapples Park Stadium (2004–2014, 2022–present)
- Fort William Stadium (2000–2003, 2014–2019)

== Attendances ==
Attendance stats are calculated by averaging each team's self-reported home attendances from Kenn.com https://kenn.com/blog/soccer/all-time-usl-league-two-attendance/

- 2000: 434 (8th in PDL)
- 2001: 528 (7th in PDL)
- 2002: 497 (11th in PDL)
- 2003: 522 (16th in PDL)
- 2004: 515 (16th in PDL)
- 2005: 551 (14th in PDL)
- 2006: 1,046 (6th in PDL)
- 2007: 744 (10th in PDL)
- 2008: 567 (18th in PDL) Playoffs 1,276 Total: 709
- 2009: 551 (20th in PDL)
- 2010: 704 (18th in PDL) Playoffs 1,165 or 1,491 Total: 861 or 830
- 2011: 599 (17th in PDL)
- 2012: 539 (16th in PDL)
- 2013: 799 (15th in PDL) Playoffs 1,785 Total: 1,018
- 2014: 615 (15th in PDL)
- 2015: 654 (10th in PDL)
- 2016: 674
- 2017: 610
- 2018: 415
- 2019: Playoffs 1,862 Total:
- 2022: 495
- 2023: 790
- 2024: 521
