= Mike Randolph =

American soccer player (born 1985)

Personal information
- Full name: Michael Horace Randolph
- Date of birth: December 3, 1985 (age 40)
- Place of birth: Chino Hills, California, United States
- Height: 5 ft 7 in (1.70 m)
- Positions: Left back; midfielder

College career
Years	Team	Apps	(Gls)
2004–2005	Yavapai Roughriders		

Senior career*
Years	Team	Apps	(Gls)
2006	Portland Timbers	25	(0)
2006–2008	Los Angeles Galaxy	39	(0)
2007	→ California Victory (loan)	5	(0)
2009	Los Angeles Legends	10	(0)
2010	Miami FC	26	(0)
2011	Los Angeles Blues	39	(2)
2012	Ventura County Fusion	1	(0)
2012	Cal FC		
2012–2014	Atlanta Silverbacks	42	(1)
2015	Ottawa Fury	3	(0)

International career^{‡}
2007	United States U23	7	(0)
- * Club domestic league appearances and goals as of August 31, 2015 ‡ National team caps and goals as of August 5, 2012

Michael Horace Randolph (born December 3, 1985) is an American soccer player.

== Career ==
=== College and amateur ===
Randolph attended Canyon Hills Junior High, where he played basketball, and Ruben S. Ayala High School. He is said to be one of the best soccer players to ever attend Ayala High School.

Randolph played for Yavapai College in Arizona, where he was named the ACCAC player of the year. Randolph had been recruited at UCLA but did not meet academic requirements at the time.

In 2004, he helped the Roughriders to a 23–2 record and its 16th consecutive Arizona Community College Athletic Conference championship. Randolph, the 2004 ACCAC Player of the Year, helped Yavapai reach the National Semifinals but could not advance to the championship and defend the back-to-back titles the team had won in 2002 and 2003. In 2005, he finished his career at Yavapai College in Prescott Ariz., helping his team to a 24–2 record and a berth in the NJCAA National Championship. However, in the Final, the Roughriders lost 3–1 to Georgia Perimeter College, denying Yavapai of its sixth National Championship.

=== Professional ===
Randolph began his career at the Portland Timbers, where he had played 25 matches in his rookie season and been considered as one of three finalists for the USL First Division "Rookie of the Year" honor.

Randolph was signed by Los Angeles Galaxy on September 16, 2006 and made his Galaxy debut April 13, 2007 as a substitute against FC Dallas.

He was released by Galaxy in February 2009, having made 39 appearances in his two years with the team. Having been unable to secure a spot on a professional team, he signed to play with Los Angeles Legends in the USL Premier Development League for the 2009 season.

Randolph was signed by USSF Division 2 club Miami FC on March 2, 2010. After one season in Florida, Randolph returned to California when he signed with Los Angeles Blues of the USL Pro league on March 17, 2011. After six years as a professional, Randolph scored his first professional goal on April 20, 2011, in a 4–2 win over Puerto Rico United.

== Personal ==
His younger brother Sean Randolph, who played college soccer for Wake Forest Demon Deacons from 2009 to 2011, died on December 21, 2013, in a motorcycle accident.
