= Michał Sławuta =

Polish footballer and coach

Personal information
- Date of birth: 10 February 1977 (age 49)
- Place of birth: Częstochowa, Poland
- Height: 1.89 m (6 ft 2 in)
- Position: Goalkeeper

Team information
- Current team: UKS SMS Łódź (women) (goalkeeping coach)

Senior career*
Years	Team	Apps	(Gls)
–2000	ŁKS Łódź	12	(0)
1996	→ Pogoń Zduńska Wola (loan)		
1998	→ Świt NDM (loan)		
2001	Dolcan Ząbki		
2001–2002	Hetman Zamość		
2002	Pallo-Sepot 44	2	(0)
2002	Haka	11	(0)
2003	Midtjylland	0	(0)
2003–2007	Lahti	113	(0)
2004	→ Rakuunat (loan)	1	(0)
2008	Ljungskile	16	(0)
2009	TPV	24	(0)
2010	PoPa	9	(0)
2011	Haka	12	(0)
2011	MuSa	3	(0)
- * Club domestic league appearances and goals

Michał Sławuta (born 10 February 1977) is a Polish former professional footballer who played as a goalkeeper. Following retirement, he became a goalkeeping coach, currently working for UKS SMS Łódź women's team.

== Honours ==
Lahti

- Finnish League Cup: 2007
