= Julio Daniel Frías =

Mexican footballer (born 1979)

Julio Daniel Frias
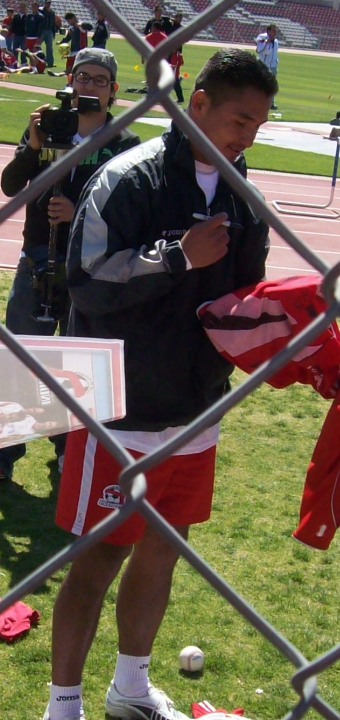

Personal information
- Full name: Julio Daniel Frias Adame
- Date of birth: March 29, 1979 (age 47)
- Place of birth: Ciudad Juárez, Mexico
- Height: 1.77 m (5 ft 10 in)
- Position: Forward

Youth career
- –1997: Tigres

Senior career*
Years	Team	Apps	(Gls)
1997–2003	Tigres II		
2002	→ El Paso Patriots (loan)	17	(9)
2004–2006	El Paso Patriots	42	(55)
2007–2011	Indios	58	(12)
2011	→ Jaguares (loan)	6	(1)
2016–2018	El Paso Coyotes (indoor)	32	(29)
- * Club domestic league appearances and goals as of 21 January 2019

Julio Daniel Frías Adame (born March 29, 1979) is a former Mexican footballer who last played for the El Paso Coyotes in the Major Arena Soccer League.

Frías made his professional debut with Indios in 2008. He is widely recognized in Ciudad Juárez due to his striking abilities and capacities. Additionally he is the leading goal scorer of Indios de Ciudad Juárez with 30 (Goals scored in Liga de Ascenso). He is known among the fans as "Maleno".
