= Lourenço Andrade =

Brazilian footballer (born 1979)

Personal information
- Full name: Lourenço Andrade de Souza Feijo
- Date of birth: March 19, 1979 (age 47)
- Place of birth: Porto Seguro, Brazil
- Positions: Forward; midfielder

Senior career*
| Years | Team | Apps | (Gls) |
| 1996–1997 | Tilleur Liégeois | 2 | (0) |
| 1999–2001 | Zacatepec | | |
| 2000–2001 | Tigres Saltillo | 0 | (0) |
| 2002 | Tigres de la UANL | 5 | (0) |
| 2002 | Tigres Saltillo | 13 | (2) |
| 2003 | Cobras de Ciudad Juárez | 18 | (3) |
| 2003 | El Paso Patriots | 20 | (9) |
| 2004 | DFW Tornados | 17 | (22) |
| 2005 | El Paso Patriots | 3 | (3) |
| 2013–2015 | Monterrey Flash (indoor) | 35 | (51) |
| 2018 | Monterrey Flash (indoor) | 7 | (4) |

Managerial career
- 2020–2024: Tigres UANL Reserves and Academy
- * Club domestic league appearances and goals

Lourenço Andrade de Souza Feijo is a Brazilian footballer who played professionally in Belgium, Mexico, and the United States.

Andrade played two games with Tilleur Liégeois in Belgium during the 1996-1997 season. He then moved to Mexico where he played for a variety of teams over the next six years. In 2003, Andrade moved to the United States to sign with the El Paso Patriots of the USL A-League.

In 2004, Andrade moved down to the DFW Tornados of the USL Premier Development League. He was All Southern Conference. In 2005, he rejoined the Patriots who had moved down to the USL PDL as well.
