= Daniel Capecci =

American soccer player (born 1983)

Dan Capecci
Personal information
- Full name: Daniel Capecci
- Date of birth: December 10, 1983 (age 42)
- Place of birth: Vestal, New York, U.S.
- Height: 5 ft 10 in (1.78 m)
- Position: Midfielder

Senior career*
Years	Team	Apps	(Gls)
1999–2000	Ancona	0	(0)
2003–2004	Syracuse Salty Dogs	-	(-)
2004–2006	Wilmington Hammerheads	18	(0)
2007	Crystal Palace Baltimore	10	(0)
2008	Oskarshamns AIK	10	(1)
2009	Valsta Syrianska IK	9	(0)
2010	IK Frej	5	(0)
2010	Sarasota United FC	9	(0)
- * Club domestic league appearances and goals

Daniel Capecci (born December 12, 1983) is an American retired soccer player.

== Career ==
Capecci joined the Wilmington Hammerheads in 2004 after a season with USL Premier Development League team Syracuse Salty Dogs. He started playing soccer with Ancona Calcio. The midfielder played the 2007 season for American USL Second Division side Crystal Palace Baltimore and joined in Winter 2008 to Sweden. In 2008 started in Sweden his European career and played for Oskarshamns AIK, Valsta Syrianska IK and IK Frej.

Capecci retired from professional soccer in 2010 and is an alumnus of the University of Florida's Applied Artificial Intelligence Group. As of 2024 he owns an AI company and works as a research software development assistant at the University of Central Florida.
