= Lance Friesz =

American soccer player

Personal information
- Full name: Lance Friesz
- Date of birth: September 16, 1983 (age 43)
- Place of birth: Mission Viejo, California, United States
- Height: 6 ft 3 in (1.91 m)
- Position: Goalkeeper

Youth career
- University of San Diego

Senior career*
Years	Team	Apps	(Gls)
2005	Boulder Rapids Reserve	3	(0)
2006	Los Angeles Storm	14	(0)
2007	Los Angeles Galaxy	0	(0)
2008	St. Patrick's Athletic	4	(0)
2010	Pateadores SC		
- * Club domestic league appearances and goals as of May 2, 2012

Lance Friesz (born September 16, 1983) is an American former soccer player.

== Early life and soccer career ==
Friesz grew up in Laguna Niguel, California with his parents and younger sister, attended Dana Hills High School, and played college soccer at the University of San Diego. During his college years he played in the USL Premier Development League for both Boulder Rapids Reserve and Los Angeles Storm.

Friesz was drafted to play for Los Angeles Galaxy, where he was second reserve goalkeeper behind Joe Cannon and Steve Cronin, but he never saw any first team playing time and was waived at the end of 2007. Friesz made headlines during his time with Galaxy for being the team's lowest wage earner. According to a BBC report his then-teammate David Beckham earned 503.9 times more than him.

Friesz moved to the Republic of Ireland in 2008, and played for St. Patrick's Athletic, but was released at the end of the season having made just four first team appearances.

Friesz returned to the United States; since 2010 he has been playing for the Yorba Linda, California-based amateur team Pateadores SC in the USASA Coast Soccer League.
