= Danny DeVall =

American soccer player (born 1972)

Danny DeVall-
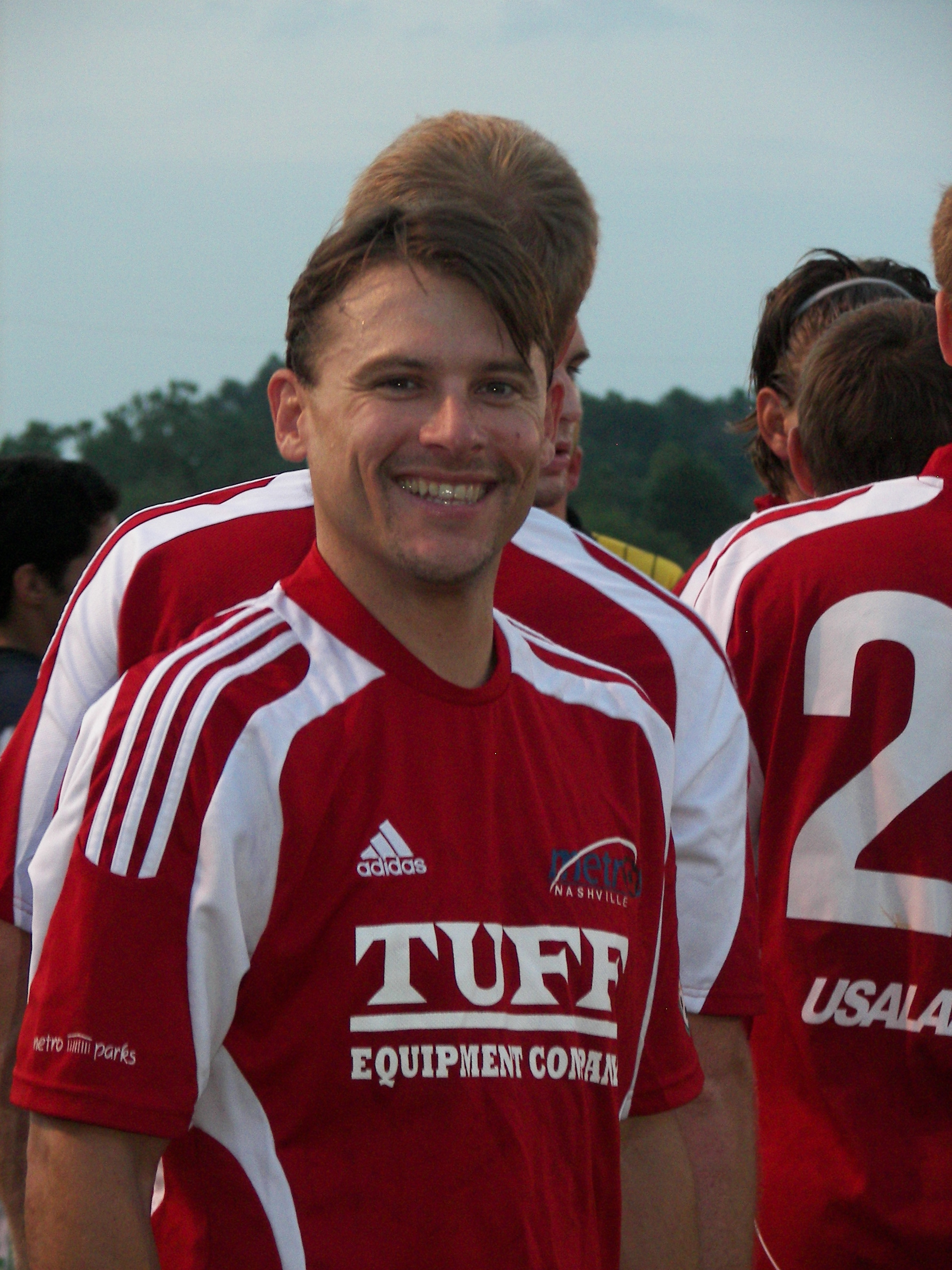

Personal information
- Full name: Daniel LeCroy DeVall
- Date of birth: September 15, 1972 (age 54)
- Place of birth: Memphis, Tennessee, United States
- Height: 5 ft 8 in (1.73 m)
- Position: Midfielder

Youth career
- 1993: University of Memphis

Senior career*
Years	Team	Apps	(Gls)
1994–1995	Memphis Jackals		
1996–2008	Nashville Metros	103	(17)
2000	→ Colorado Rapids (loan)	2	(0)
- * Club domestic league appearances and goals

Daniel LeCroy DeVall (born September 15, 1972) is a retired professional U.S. soccer midfielder and the current CEO of Merging Global Technologies. He is the founder and was the CEO of Local Business Marketing Corporation. In his professional soccer career, he played two games for the Colorado Rapids in Major League Soccer but spent most of his career with his longest tenured team, the Nashville Metros. DeVall retired from the Nashville Metros and professional competition in 2008, and has been inducted into the Nashville Metros hall of fame.

== Youth ==
The son of Roger DeVall and Diana Dillingham Mon, Daniel DeVall was born in Memphis, Tennessee. He attended St. Ann's Elementary School in Bartlett, TN, a suburb of Memphis. DeVall excelled at sports and went on to compete in Soccer and Wrestling at Memphis Catholic High School where he graduated in 1990. He was given a full scholarship for soccer by Chris Bartels, the head coach of the University of Memphis, at that time called Memphis State University.

== Soccer ==
After a year at the University of Memphis and starting at times as a freshman, he dropped out to pursue his dream of being a professional soccer player. DeVall played two years for the Memphis Jackals of the semi-pro USISL. In 1996, while playing on the Tennessee Olympic Development Program (ODP) team, the coach of the USISL club Nashville Metros, Rhomes “Zito” Aur, recruited DeVall to play for him. In 1997, the Nashville Metros were promoted to full professional status as an A-League division team of the USL. In 1999, financial considerations led to the team moving to Franklin, Tennessee and renaming itself the Tennessee Rhythm. In 2000, DeVall was called up by the Colorado Rapids of Major League Soccer. DeVall played 30 minutes of his first MLS game against the Columbus Crew. He then started and played 80 minutes of his next game for the Colorado Rapids at a home game in Denver, Colorado. DeVall was offered the league minimum, $24,000 per year, by head coach Glenn Myernick. DeVall turned down the offer as he was making more than double the money in Nashville playing for the Metros and working as a mortgage broker for People's Home Equity. In 2001, the Rhythm returned to Nashville, regaining the Metros name. It also dropped from the USL A-League to the fourth division Premier Development League. DeVall played for the Metros until officially retiring in 2008, holding the team record in games played. DeVall is one of only two players inducted into the Nashville Metros Hall of Fame.
