= Albany BWP Highlanders =

- Full name: Albany BWP Highlanders
- Nickname: Highlanders
- Founded: 2003
- Dissolved: 2010
- Ground: Frank Bailey Field; Schenectady, New York
- Capacity: 3,000
- Owner: (United States) Jeff Rockmore
- Head Coach: (United States) Franz Zwicklbauer
- League: USL Premier Development League
- 2010: 3rd, Northeast; Playoffs: DNQ
Home colors	Away colors

Albany BWP Highlanders was an American soccer team based in Schenectady, New York, United States. Founded in 2003, the team played in the USL Premier Development League (PDL), the fourth tier of the American Soccer Pyramid, in the Northeast Division of the Eastern Conference. The team spent two years on hiatus from the league in 2008 and 2009, returning to competition in 2010, then folded at the end of the season.

The team played its home games at Frank Bailey Field on the campus of Union College in nearby Schenectady, New York, The team's colors were black, gold, and white.

== History ==
The roots of the Highlanders go back to Steve Freeman's youth in Tampa, Florida where he played for Blackwatch Keelley. Freeman spent his first season of college playing for Hartwick College and another with Siena College, both in New York, before finishing college in Florida. After graduation, he returned to New York and settled in Albany where he taught school. In January 1997, he founded Albany Blackwatch, a youth club modeled on the club he played for as a boy. The club began with two boys teams, but quickly expanded to several boys and girls teams, each with a Scottish-themed name. In 2001, Blackwatch entered a team into the USL Super Y-League. In 2003, Freeman created the Blackwatch Highlanders and entered it into the USL Premier Development League. Freeman served as the general manager and Bernie Watt coached the team. The Highlanders played from 2003 until 2007, first as Blackwatch and then as the Albany Admirals, the last season with Freeman as head coach. They then went on a two-year hiatus before being resurrected in 2009 as the Albany BWP Highlanders, and re-joined the PDL for the 2010 season.

== Notable former players ==
This list of notable former players comprises players who went on to play professional soccer after playing for the team in the Premier Development League, or those who previously played professionally before joining the team.

- (Colombia) Jhonny Arteaga
- (United States) Devlin Barnes
- (Scotland) Anthony McCann
- (United States) Josh Bolton
- (United States) Colin Burns
- (United States) Scott Cannon
- (United States) Daniel Capecci
- (United States) Greg Chevalier
- (United States) Adrian Dubois
- (United States) Jordan James
- (United States) Brian Levey
- (United States) Ryan Pierce
- (United States) Chris Riley
- (The Bahamas) Dwayne Whylly

== Rosters ==
August 2010 roster

Note: Flags indicate national team as defined under FIFA eligibility rules; some limited exceptions apply. Players may hold more than one non-FIFA nationality.

No.	Pos.	Nation	Player
0	GK	USA	Ryan Jones
1	GK	USA	Adam Perron
2	DF	USA	Robert Millock
3	DF	USA	David Burke
4	DF	USA	Tommy Klim
5	MF	ENG	Chris Hobbs
6	MF	USA	Sam DeMello
7	MF	SCO	Bruce Cutler
8	MF	USA	Darko Knezevic
9	MF	USA	T. J. Popolizio
10	MF	USA	Roberto Sgueglia
11	FW	CAN	Brendan Gorman
12	FW	USA	David Clemens
13	DF	USA	Gabe Zieff
14	MF	USA	Taylor Esper
15	DF	CAN	Clifton Huxtable
16	MF	USA	Jake Johnson

No.	Pos.	Nation	Player
17	DF	USA	Austin Hughes
18	DF	USA	Austin Britt
19	FW	USA	Alen Jusic
22	FW	USA	David Chung
25	DF	GAM	Essaha Jallow
00	GK	CAN	Jonathan Viscosi
—	MF	USA	Kyle Clancy
—	MF	USA	Adam Costello
—	FW	USA	James Curley
—	FW	USA	Aaron Gallusser
—	FW	USA	Joshua Gregg
—	DF	SRB	Milos Jankovic
—	DF	USA	Trey Jasenski
—	DF	USA	Greg Lloyd
—	DF	USA	Joseph Lontrato
—	DF	USA	Domenico Vitale

== Year-by-year ==
Year	Division	League	Regular season	Playoffs	Open Cup
2003	4	USL PDL	6th, Northeast	Did not qualify	Did not qualify
2004	4	USL PDL	3rd, Northeast	Did not qualify	Did not qualify
2005	4	USL PDL	4th, Northeast	Did not qualify	Did not qualify
2006	4	USL PDL	4th, New England	Did not qualify	Did not qualify
2007	4	USL PDL	5th, Northeast	Did not qualify	Did not qualify
2008	On Hiatus				
2009	On Hiatus				
2010	4	USL PDL	3rd Northeast	Did not qualify	Did not qualify

== Head coaches ==
- (United States) Bernie Watt (2003)
- (United States) Steve Freeman (2007)
- (United States) Franz Zwicklbauer (2010)

== Stadia ==
- Frank Bailey Field; Schenectady, New York (2003–2007, 2010)
- CBA Stadium; Albany, New York (2007) 2 games

== Average attendance ==
Attendance stats are calculated by averaging each team's self-reported home attendances from the historical match archive at https://web.archive.org/web/20100105175057/http://www.uslsoccer.com/history/index_E.html.

- 2005: 149
- 2006: 138
- 2007: 130
- 2008: Did not play
- 2009: Did not play
- 2010: 185
