= Methembe Ndlovu =

Zimbabwean footballer (born 1973)

Personal information
- Full name: Methembe Ndlovu
- Date of birth: 16 August 1973 (age 53)
- Place of birth: Bulawayo , Zimbabwe
- Position: Midfielder

Youth career
- 1996: Dartmouth Big Green

Senior career*
| Years | Team | Apps | (Gls) |
| 1997 | Albuquerque Geckos | | |
| 1998–1999 | Highlanders | | |
| 1999–2000 | Boston Bulldogs | 20 | (0) |
| 2000 | Cape Cod Crusaders | 14 | (2) |
| 2001 | Boston Bulldogs | 18 | (0) |
| 2002–2003 | Cape Cod Crusaders | 24 | (1) |
| 2004–2005 | Indiana Invaders | 27 | (0) |

International career
| 1998 | Zimbabwe | 12 | (0) |

Managerial career
- 2002: Cape Cod Crusaders (assistant)
- 2003: Cape Cod Crusaders
- 2004–2005: Indiana Invaders
- 2006–2007: Highlanders
- * Club domestic league appearances and goals

Methembe Ndlovu (born 16 August 1973) is a former Zimbabwean footballer and current head coach of men's soccer at Trinity College (Connecticut). Ndlovu spent his playing career with Albuquerque Geckos, Highlanders F.C., Boston Bulldogs and as a player/coach for Cape Cod Crusaders and Indiana Invaders.

Ndlovu made several appearances for the Zimbabwe national football team, including an appearance at the 1998 COSAFA Cup. Methembe Ndlovu was recently appointed for the US coaching role for Soccer. He is said to be the last coach to lead the team Highlanders to the Premier Soccer League title after Bulawayo giants according to the article NewZimbabwe.com.
