= Ryan Pierce (soccer) =

American soccer player (born 1983)

Personal information
- Full name: Ryan Pierce
- Date of birth: July 9, 1983 (age 43)
- Place of birth: Albany, New York, United States
- Height: 5 ft 4 in (1.63 m)
- Position: Defender

College career
Years	Team	Apps	(Gls)
2002–2003	Herkimer County Generals		
2004–2005	Binghamton Bearcats		

Senior career*
Years	Team	Apps	(Gls)
2005	Albany Admirals	14	(4)
2006	Cape Cod Crusaders	16	(1)
2007–2008	Harrisburg City Islanders	18	(0)
2007–2010	Baltimore Blast (indoor)	56	(2)
2009	Crystal Palace Baltimore	15	(0)
2010	Pittsburgh Riverhounds	11	(0)
2011–2013	Syracuse Silver Knights (indoor)	47	(9)
- * Club domestic league appearances and goals as of May 12, 2020

Ryan Pierce (born July 9, 1983, in Albany, New York) is an American soccer player.

== Career ==
=== College and amateur ===
Pierce played two years of college soccer at Herkimer County Community College, where he was a NJCAA 1st Team All American, before transferring to Binghamton University as a junior in 2004.

During his college years Pierce also played in the Premier Development League with both his hometown Albany Admirals and the Cape Cod Crusaders.

=== Professional ===
Pierce turned professional with Harrisburg City Islanders in the USL Second Division in 2007, and made his professional debut on April 21, 2007, in Harrisburg's first game of the season, a 1–1 tie with the Wilmington Hammerheads.

After helping the Islanders win the 2007 USL-2 championship, he transferred to Crystal Palace Baltimore for the 2009 season.

Pierce also has professional indoor soccer experience, having helped the Baltimore Blast win the 2008/2009 NISL Championship.

Pierce signed with the Pittsburgh Riverhounds for the 2010 USL-2 season, and made his debut April 24, 2010 as a substitute against the Charleston Battery.
