= Sioux Falls Spitfire =

American soccer team

- Full name: Sioux Falls Spitfire
- Nicknames: The Spitfire, The Dragons
- Founded: 2001
- Dissolved: 2007
- Ground: McEneaney Field
- Capacity: 3,000
- Chairman: (United States) Rich Jensen
- Manager: (United States) Daniel Sullivan
- League: USL Premier Development League
- 2007: 7th, Heartland Division
Home colors	Away colors

Sioux Falls Spitfire was an American soccer team, founded in 2001. The team was a member of the United Soccer Leagues Premier Development League (PDL), the fourth tier of the American Soccer Pyramid, until 2007, when the team left the league and the franchise was terminated.

The team played its home games at McEneaney Field on the grounds of O’Gorman High School in the city of Sioux Falls, South Dakota. The team's colors were white and blue.

== Year-by-year ==
Year	Division	League	Regular season	Playoffs	Open Cup
2001	4	USL PDL	1st, Heartland	National Semifinals (3rd Place)	Did not qualify
2002	4	USL PDL	3rd, Heartland	Did not qualify	Did not qualify
2003	4	USL PDL	7th, Heartland	Did not qualify	Did not qualify
2004	4	USL PDL	8th, Heartland	Did not qualify	Did not qualify
2005	4	USL PDL	7th, Heartland	Did not qualify	Did not qualify
2006	4	USL PDL	5th, Heartland	Did not qualify	Did not qualify
2007	4	USL PDL	7th, Heartland	Did not qualify	Did not qualify

== Honors ==
- USL PDL Heartland Division Champions 2001

== Coaches ==
- (United States) Tim Grove 2005
- (United States) Daniel Ohayon 2006
- (United States) Daniel Sullivan 2007

== Stadia ==
- McEneaney Field, Sioux Falls, South Dakota 2003–07

== Average attendance ==
- 2001: 1,616 (3rd in PDL) Playoffs: 2,037 Overall: 1,681
- 2002: 1,668 (3rd in PDL)
- 2003: 1,401 (2nd in PDL)
- 2004: 710 (7th in PDL)
- 2005: 1,210 (3rd in PDL)
- 2006: 1,176 (4th in PDL)
- 2007: 1,158 (6th in PDL)

Overall Total 80,145 62 1,293 Playoffs 4,074 2 2,037 Overall 84,219 64 1,316
