= LA Laguna FC =

- Founded: 2010
- Ground: Santa Ana Stadium
- Capacity: 9,000
- Owner: Gerardo Camacho
- Head Coach: Fabian Sandoval
- League: Premier Development League
- 2016: 7th, Southwest Division; Playoffs: DNQ
Home colors	Away colors

Original Los Angeles Storm logo

Legends logo 2008–2009

Azul logo 2010

LA Laguna FC was an American soccer team based in the Los Angeles area, United States. Founded in 2010, the team played in the Premier Development League (PDL) (now USL League Two), the fourth tier of the American Soccer Pyramid, in the Southwest Division of the Western Conference.

The team would play some of its home matches at Santa Ana Stadium and others at Citrus College and Pomona College starting in May 2016.

== History ==
After acquiring the PDL franchise rights to the Springfield Storm franchise that used to play in the PDL out of Springfield, Missouri, the team began life as Los Angeles Storm under head coach Chris Volk, and made their debut in PDL competition in 2010, one of several teams joining the Southwest division as it expanded to nine teams. Playing at Citrus Stadium on the campus of Citrus College in Glendora, California, Storm made an inauspicious start, tying 1–1 with the San Fernando Valley Quakes, but quickly recovered to register impressive back-to-back victories over Fresno Fuego and Bakersfield Brigade. However, Storm's mid-season form proved to be their downfall, as the team slumped to five defeats in six games (including a humiliating 0–4 to the eventual divisional champions Southern California Seahorses), ending their first season playoff hopes. A morale-boosting 5–0 win over Bakersfield Brigade in their penultimate game was a positive, but eventually they finished sixth in the table. David Niemeyer was the Storm's top scorer in their freshman year, scoring 7 goals in his 15 games, while MLS-bound Mexican midfielder Erasmo Solorzano was the assist king with 3. Goalkeeper Lance Friesz was also a standout – so much so, that he was drafted by Los Angeles Galaxy in the offseason.

The Storm's second year began in terrible fashion, suffering a 5–0 defeat to the San Fernando Valley Quakes on the opening day of the season. They did not register their first victory – 2–1 over new boys San Jose Frogs – until their third game, and from then on the Storm's season was one of see-sawing inconsistency. Back-to-back 3–1 wins over Orange County Blue Star and Lancaster Rattlers was followed by a 1–5 disaster at home to Fresno Fuego, which was followed by a 5–1 thrashing of Bakersfield Brigade... and so it went. By the end of the season, Storm were struggling to pick up wins wherever they went, but at least they started seeing some consistency; however, the four ties in their last six games ultimately consigned them to 5th place in the table, outside the playoffs for a second year. Ross Schunk was by far their outstanding goalscorer, tallying goals 10 in a season which included a hat trick at home to Lancaster Rattlers. Alex Bengard registered 5 assists.

2008 saw a name change, with Storm becoming Los Angeles Legends following a merger between two local youth soccer organizations, and a coaching change, with Azusa Pacific soccer coach Phil Wolf taking over the reins from Chris Volk. The Legends started the season in magnificent form, downing Orange County Blue Star 1–0 in their opening game, and then registering two back-to-back 5–0 home victories over Lancaster Rattlers and San Fernando Valley Quakes, the first of which featured a hat-trick from striker Davis Paul. Legends' blistering early-season success saw them qualify for their first ever US Open Cup, where they faced USL2 side (and eventual quarter-finalists) Crystal Palace Baltimore at home in Azusa. Sadly for the Legends their foray into the Cup was a short one, as they were beaten 2–1 off a late winner by Baltimore's Pat Healey. Legends continued the year as high scoring entertainers: they put six past Orange County Blue Star in mid-June, then conceded six away at Fresno Fuego in the very next game. However, as the season wound down, the team's early season form deserted them, as four defeats in their last five games left them out of playoff contention. Legends ended the year a comfortable mid-table 6th; Davis Paul was top scorer, knocking in an impressive 10 goals, and contributing five assists for his strike partner, Ross Schunk.

Legends relocated from the San Gabriel Valley to East Los Angeles in 2009, hired a new head coach in the shape of ex-Chivas USA striker Brent Whitfield, and signed ex-Los Angeles Galaxy defender Mike Randolph to lead a new-look team; the change in fortunes on the field as a result was remarkable. Despite losing their opening two games of the season 3–2 to Lancaster Rattlers and 3–0 to Fresno Fuego, the team bounced back magnificently, and embarked on a 12-game unbeaten run through the middle of the season which kept them in the hunt for the divisional title throughout the year. Legends were the division's high-scoring entertainers; they put six past Lancaster in the return game, hammered Fresno 7–1 on the road, beat Ogden Outlaws 5–0, and overcame Orange County Blue Star 4–3 in a seesaw game in early July. Each of these four games was highlighted by hat tricks from player/coach Brent Whitfield, who would eventually go on to score 14 goals in his 9 appearances for the Legends, good for third nationally. Legends briefly topped the division as the regular season wound down, but a 2–0 loss to Fresno in their penultimate game handed the division to the Hollywood United Hitmen, with whom they had previously been involved in an astonishing 0–0 tie which featured seven red cards. The Legends secured second place in the division, and a first trip to the postseason, with a 1–0 win over Ventura County Fusion, but Fusion got their revenge in the divisional playoff semifinal with a 2–1 victory which ended Los Angeles' title hopes at the first hurdle.

During the 2009–2010 offseason the Legends were bought out by the owners of the long-standing Los Angeles-based amateur side LA Blues, and re-branded themselves as the Los Angeles Azul Legends. The team's new logo was unveiled on their new website in April 2010.

During the 2010–2011 offseason the team re-branded themselves again, this time as the Los Angeles Misioneros. The team's new logo was unveiled on their new website in January 2011.

== Players ==
=== Current roster ===
As at April 29, 2012.

Note: Flags indicate national team as defined under FIFA eligibility rules; some limited exceptions apply. Players may hold more than one non-FIFA nationality.

No.	Pos.	Nation	Player
0	GK	USA	Sheldon Steenhuis
1	GK	ENG	Matthew Mallak
2	DF	GHA	Mohammed Takiyudin
3	DF	ENG	Jamiesh Holait
4	DF	USA	Angel De Alba
5	DF	USA	Jose Ortega
6	DF	USA	Ulises Mosqueda
7	FW	JPN	Sung Kim
8	MF	USA	Rene Anguiano
9	MF	USA	Rodolfo Sandoval
10	MF	MEX	Ramiro Diaz
11	FW	MEX	Jesus Vasquez
11	MF	USA	Jonathan Tovar
12	DF	USA	Hector Romo

No.	Pos.	Nation	Player
12	MF	UKR	Leonid Sharf
13	MF	BRB	Christian King
14	MF	MEX	Alberto Garcia
15	DF	USA	Cruz Hernandez
16	FW	USA	Kyrian Nwabueze
17	DF	SLV	Diego Calix
18	MF	USA	Angel Lomeli
19	MF	NED	Vincent Weijl
20	FW	USA	Andy Contreras
21	FW	NGA	Stephon Mongu
22	DF	USA	Edgar Espinoza
23	MF	NED	Cesar Samaniego
23	MF	USA	Cesar Samaniego

=== Notable former players ===
This list of notable former players comprises players who went on to play professional soccer after playing for the team in the Premier Development League, or those who previously played professionally before joining the team.

- (United States) Joe Barton
- (United States) Tony Beltran
- (United States) Alex Bengard
- (Mexico) Javier Castro
- (United States) Kraig Chiles
- (United States) Gabriel Farfan
- (United States) Michael Farfan
- (United States) Lance Friesz
- (Cuba) Erlys García
- (United States) Maxwell Griffin
- (Cuba) Lester Moré
- (United States) Kyle Nakazawa
- (United States) Davis Paul
- (United States) Adrien Perez
- (United States) Mike Randolph
- (United States) Ross Schunk
- (Mexico) Erasmo Solorzano
- (United States) Brent Whitfield
- (El Salvador) Gerson Mayen
- (El Salvador) Edwin Miranda
- (Netherlands) Vincent Weijl
- (Ghana) Mohammed Takiyudin

== Year-by-year ==
Year	Division	League	Regular season	Playoffs	Open Cup
2006	4	USL PDL	6th, Southwest	Did not qualify	Did not qualify
2007	4	USL PDL	5th, Southwest	Did not qualify	Did not qualify
2008	4	USL PDL	6th, Southwest	Did not qualify	First Round
2009	4	USL PDL	2nd, Southwest	Divisional Semifinals	Did not qualify
2010	4	USL PDL	6th, Southwest	Did not qualify	Did not qualify
2011	4	USL PDL	8th, Southwest	Did not qualify	Did not qualify
2012	4	USL PDL	4th, Southwest	Did not qualify	Did not qualify
2013	4	USL PDL	3rd, Southwest	Did not qualify	Did not qualify
2014	4	USL PDL	2nd, Southwest	Conference Quarterfinals	First Round
2015	4	USL PDL	5th, Southwest	Did not qualify	First Round
2016	4	USL PDL	7th, Southwest	Did not qualify	Did not qualify

== General Managers ==
- (United States) Freddy Avellaneda(Club Administrator) (2011–present)
- (Mexico) Jose Antonio Jimenez (2012–present)
- (Argentina) Daniel Collazo (2014–present)

== Stadia ==
- Citrus Stadium; Glendora, California (2006–2007)
- Cougar Stadium; Azusa, California (2008)
- Keegan Stadium at Bishop Mora Salesian High School; East Los Angeles, California (2009–2010)
- Ayala Stadium; Chino, California 1 game (2009)
- Stadium at Crenshaw High School; Crenshaw, California 4 games (2010–2011)
- Stadium at Morningside High School; Inglewood, California (2011)
- Stadium at George Washington Carver Middle School; Los Angeles, California (2012; 2015–present)
- Stadium at California State University, San Bernardino; San Bernardino, California (2013–2014)
- Stadium at Linda Esperanza Marquez High School- Citrus College- Glendale Sports Complex; Huntington Park-Glendora-Glendale, California (2014)
- Santa Ana Stadium (2016)
- Stadium at Citrus College (2016)
- Stadium at Pomona College (2016)

== Average attendance ==
Attendance stats were calculated by averaging each team's self-reported home attendances from the historical match.

- 2006: 338
- 2007: 512
- 2008: not yet available
- 2009: 155
- 2010: 716
- 2011: not yet available
- 2012: not yet available
- 2013: not yet available
- 2014: 3930
