= Cape Cod Crusaders =

American soccer team

- Full name: Cape Cod Crusaders
- Nickname: The Crusaders
- Founded: 1994
- Dissolved: 2008
- Ground: Massachusetts Maritime Academy
- Chairman: (United States) Joe Bradley
- Manager: (United States) Paul Baber
- League: USL Premier Development League
- 2008: 1st, New England Division; Playoff Conference Semifinals
Home colors	Away colors

The Cape Cod Crusaders was an American soccer team based in Buzzards Bay, Massachusetts. Founded in 1994, the team played in the USL Premier Development League (PDL), the fourth tier of the American Soccer Pyramid, until 2008, when the franchise folded and the team left the league.

The team played its home games at several different venues in eastern Massachusetts: mainly in stadium on the campus of the Massachusetts Maritime Academy, but also at Whitman-Hanson High School in Whitman, Massachusetts, and at Bowditch Stadium in Framingham, Massachusetts. Also played at Barnstable High School in the town of Hyannis, Massachusetts. The Crusaders' historical home was the stadium on the grounds Dennis Yarmouth High School in the town of Yarmouth, Massachusetts, where they won back to back championships in 2002 and 2003. The team's colors were red and white.

The team had a sister organization, the Boston Renegades, who play in the women's USL W-League. The club still fields a team in the USL's Super-20 League, a league for players 17 to 20 years of age run under the United Soccer Leagues umbrella.

== History ==
The Crusaders were one of the most successful minor-league soccer teams in the United States, having been national PDL champions twice, in 2002 and 2003. The team was also one of the most long-lasting teams, having played in four different leagues, at two different levels, over the course of more than a decade. In the mid-2000s the Crusaders became part of the Massachusetts Premier Soccer (MPS) organization, which runs soccer schools and north senior and junior amateur leagues across Massachusetts, with the intent of developing and promoting the game.

For each season the Crusaders also fielded a Futures Team that won 3 Championships in a four year span led by Striker Keith Simpson, a four time scoring champion.

In 2007, Crusaders striker Ricardo Pierre-Louis was part of the Haiti squad which took part in the 2007 CONCACAF Gold Cup. Pierre-Louis was the only PDL player to take part in the tournament, coming on as a substitute in the 1–1 draw with Costa Rica, and playing a full 90 minutes in the 2–0 defeat to Canada.

== Players ==
=== Final squad ===
vs. Brooklyn Knights, 25 July 2008 Note: Flags indicate national team as defined under FIFA eligibility rules; some limited exceptions apply. Players may hold more than one non-FIFA nationality.

No.	Pos.	Nation	Player
0	GK	USA	Evan Bush
4	DF	SCO	Graham Munro
6	DF	USA	Matthew Narode
7	MF	ENG	Jason Massie
8	MF	ENG	Yan Klukowski
9	MF	IRL	Liam Maloney
10	MF	ENG	Tom Marston
11	MF	USA	Christian Vercollone
12	DF	IRL	Michael Coburn
14	DF	USA	Daniel Schultz
15	FW	USA	Matt Horth
16	FW	USA	Franklin Daniel
17	FW	ENG	Tony Awor
18	MF	HAI	Edens Chery
21	MF	USA	Jordan Lynn
23	FW	CIV	Lee Kouadio

== Year-by-year ==
Year	Division	League	Reg. season	Playoffs	Open Cup
1994	3	USISL	3rd, Northeast	Divisional Semifinals	Did not enter
1995	3	USISL Pro League	4th, Coastal	Divisional Semifinals	Did not qualify
1996	3	USISL Select League	5th, North Atlantic	Did not qualify	Did not qualify
1997	3	USISL D-3 Pro League	7th, Northeast	Did not qualify	Did not qualify
1998	3	USISL D-3 Pro League	4th, Northeast	Division Semifinals	Did not qualify
1999	3	USL D3-Pro League	7th, Northern	Did not qualify	1st Round
2000	3	USL D3-Pro League	6th, Northern	Did not qualify	2nd Round
2001	4	USL PDL	6th, Northeast	Did not qualify	2nd Round
2002	4	USL PDL	2nd, Northeast	Champion	Did not qualify
2003	4	USL PDL	2nd, Northeast	Champion	Did not qualify
2004	4	USL PDL	2nd, Northeast	Conference Semifinals	3rd Round
2005	4	USL PDL	1st, Northeast	Conference Semifinals	Did not qualify
2006	4	USL PDL	1st, New England	Conference Finals	1st Round
2007	4	USL PDL	1st, Northeast	Conference Finals	Did not qualify
2008	4	USL PDL	1st, New England	Conference Semifinals	Did not qualify

== Honors ==
- USL PDL New England Division Champion 2008
- USL PDL Northeast Division Champion 2007
- USL PDL New England Division Champion 2006
- USL PDL Northeast Division Champion 2005
- USL PDL Champion 2003
- USL PDL Eastern Conference Champion 2003
- USL PDL Champion 2002
- USL PDL Eastern Conference Champion 2002

== Head coaches ==
- (Zimbabwe) Methembe Ndlovu (2003)
- (United States) Paul Baber (2005–2008)

== Stadiums ==
Crusaders' last stadium at Massachusetts Maritime Academy

- Stadium at Dennis Yarmouth High School, South Yarmouth, Massachusetts (1994–2003)
- Stadium at Barnstable High School, Hyannis, Massachusetts (2004–2007)
- Stadium at Nauset Regional High School, North Eastham, Massachusetts 1 game (2005)
- Stadium at Weymouth High School, Weymouth, Massachusetts 1 game (2006)
- Stadium at Whitman-Hanson Regional High School, Whitman, Massachusetts 3 games (2007–2008)
- Stadium at Massachusetts Maritime Academy, Buzzards Bay, Massachusetts (2008)
- Stadium at Bridgewater-Raynham Regional High School, Bridgewater, Massachusetts 1 game (2008)
- Bowditch Stadium, Framingham, Massachusetts 1 game (2008)

== Average attendance ==
- 1994: NA
- 1995: NA
- 1996: 1,073 (16th in Select League)
- 1997: 783
- 1998: 433
- 1999: 511
- 2000: 554
- 2001: 331 (15th in PDL)
- 2002: 385 (15th in PDL) Playoffs: 2,239 Overall: 591
- 2003: 392 (20th in PDL) Playoffs: 1,238 Overall: 477
- 2004: 413 (22nd in PDL)
- 2005: 306 (32nd in PDL)
- 2006: 330 (27th in PDL)
- 2007: 284 (36th in PDL)
- 2008: 309 (35th in PDL)
