= Colorado Rapids U-23 =

American soccer team

- Full name: Colorado Rapids U-23
- Founded: 2000; 26 years ago 2017; 9 years ago (refounded)
- Stadium: Dick's Sporting Goods Park
- Capacity: 1,000
- Owner: Colorado Rapids
- Head Coach: Erik Bushey
- League: Premier Development League
- 2018: 1st, Mountain Division; Playoffs: Conference Semifinals
- Website: https://www.coloradorapids.com/u23
Home colors	Away colors

Colorado Rapids U–23 were an American soccer team based in the Denver suburb of Commerce City, Colorado. Originally founded in 2000 as part of the development system for the Colorado Rapids, the team played in the Premier Development League, the fourth tier of the American Soccer Pyramid.

== Year-by-year ==
Year	Division	League	Regular season	Playoffs	Open Cup	Avg. attendance
Boulder Nova
2000	4	USL PDL	3rd, Rocky Mountain	Did not qualify	Did not qualify	322
2001	4	USL PDL	2nd, Rocky Mountain	Conference Finals	Did not qualify	166
Boulder Rapids Reserve
2002	4	USL PDL	2nd, Heartland	National Final	Did not qualify	134
2003	4	USL PDL	4th, Heartland	Did not qualify	Did not qualify	847
2004	4	USL PDL	2nd, Heartland	National Final	3rd Round	487
2005	4	USL PDL	1st, Heartland	Conference Semifinals	Did not qualify	667
2006	4	USL PDL	1st, Heartland	Conference Semifinals	Did not qualify	603
Colorado Rapids U-23
2007	4	USL PDL	5th, Heartland	Did not qualify	Did not qualify	242
2008	4	USL PDL	2nd, Heartland	Divisional Round	Did not qualify	205

Year	Division	League	Regular season	Playoffs	Open Cup
2017	4	PDL	3rd, Mountain	Did not qualify	Did not qualify
2018	4	PDL	1st, Mountain	Conference Semifinals	Did not qualify

== Honors ==
- USL PDL Mountain Division champions 2018
- USL PDL Heartland Division champions 2005, 2006

== Coaches ==
- (United States) Mike Seabolt (2002–2003)
- (United States) Peter Ambrose (2004–2008)
- (United States) Chris Martinez (2017)
- (United States) Erik Bushey (2018)

== Stadium ==
Pleasant View Field

- Pleasant View Field, Boulder, Colorado (2003–2008)
- Dick's Sporting Goods Park Field #20, Commerce City, Colorado (2017–2018)
