= 2009 PDL season =

USL Premier Development League
- Official 2009 PDL Championship logo
- Season: 2009
- Champions: Ventura County Fusion (1st Title)
- Regular Season Champions: Reading Rage (1st Title)
- Matches: 544
- Goals: 1,790 (3.29 per match)
- Best player: (United States) Aaron Wheeler Reading Rage
- Top goalscorer: (United States) Aaron Wheeler Reading Rage (17 Goals)
- Best goalkeeper: (United States) Jimmy Maurer Chicago Fire Premier
- Biggest home win: 9–0, Ottawa Fury over Westchester Flames
- Biggest away win: 7–1, Ocean City Barons over Newark Ironbound Express; 7–1 Los Angeles Legends over Fresno Fuego
- Highest scoring: 10 goals, Portland Timbers U23's 8–2 Yakima Reds; 10 goals, Lancaster Rattlers 5–5 Fresno Fuego; 10 goals, Hollywood United Hitmen 7–3 Ogden Outlaws
- Average attendance: 542

The 2009 USL Premier Development League season was the 15th season of the PDL. The regular season began on May 1, 2009, and ended on July 19, 2009. The league consisted of 68 teams across eight divisions with the elimination of the Midwest and New England divisions. The PDL Championship Game was held on August 8, 2009, and was broadcast on Fox Soccer Channel in the United States.

Ventura County Fusion finished the season as national champions, beating Chicago Fire Premier 2–1 in the PDL Championship game in Ventura, California on August 8, 2009.

Reading Rage finished with the best regular season record in the league, winning 13 out of their 16 games, suffering just one loss, and finishing with a +41 goal difference.

Reading Rage striker Aaron Wheeler was the league's top scorer and MVP, knocking in 17 goals, while his teammate Jon Ports led the league with 10 assists. Mississippi Brilla goalkeeper Josh Pantazelos enjoyed the best goalkeeping statistics, with a goals against average of 0.615 on the season, including 8 shutouts.

== Changes From 2008 ==
=== Name Changes ===
- Cary Railhawks U23's changed their name to the Cary Clarets to reflect their new association with English Championship team Burnley.
- New Orleans Shell Shockers rebranded themselves as the New Orleans Jesters, having terminated their sponsorship deal with the Shell Oil Company.

=== New Franchises ===
- Eleven franchises have been announced as joining the league this year:

Team name	Metro area	Location	Previous affiliation
(Georgia (U.S. state)) Atlanta Blackhawks	Greater Atlanta area	Alpharetta, GA	expansion
(Ontario) Forest City London	London area	London, ON	expansion
(California) Hollywood United Hitmen	West Los Angeles area	Pacific Palisades, CA	expansion
(Washington (state)) Kitsap Pumas	Kitsap County area	Bremerton, WA	expansion
(Oregon) Portland Timbers U23's	Greater Portland area	Portland, OR	expansion
Real Colorado Foxes	Denver area	Highlands Ranch, CO	expansion
(Texas) Rio Grande Valley Bravos	Rio Grande Valley area	Pharr, TX	expansion
(Minnesota) Rochester Thunder	Rochester area	Rochester, MN	expansion
(Washington (state)) Seattle Wolves	Seattle area	Tukwila, WA	PCSL
(British Columbia) Victoria Highlanders	Victoria area	Victoria, BC	expansion
West Texas United Sockers	Midland-Odessa area	Midland, TX	expansion

=== On hiatus ===
- One team went on hiatus due to home stadium renovations:
  - Vermont Voltage – St. Albans, Vermont

=== Folding ===
- Nine teams have been announced as leaving the league prior to the beginning of the season:
  - Atlanta Silverbacks U23's – Chamblee, Georgia
  - Cape Cod Crusaders – Buzzards Bay, Massachusetts
  - Colorado Rapids U23's – Boulder, Colorado
  - Palm Beach Pumas – Wellington, Florida
  - Richmond Kickers Future – Richmond, Virginia
  - San Fernando Valley Quakes – Woodland Hills, California
  - San Francisco Seals – San Francisco, California
  - San Jose Frogs – San Jose, California
  - West Michigan Edge – Kentwood, Michigan

== Standings ==
In 2009, there was a more balanced 8 divisions (down from 10 in 2008). The top 3 from each division qualified for the play-offs, with the division champion receiving a bye through the first round.

Legend
Team won the Division Title
Team qualified for playoff berth

=== Central Conference ===
==== Great Lakes Division ====
Pos	Team	Pld	W	L	T	GF	GA	GD	Pts
1	Kalamazoo Outrage	16	11	2	3	32	17	+15	36
2	Chicago Fire Premier	16	10	1	5	33	12	+21	35
3	Forest City London	16	8	3	5	27	16	+11	29
4	Michigan Bucks	16	8	5	3	26	22	+4	27
5	Indiana Invaders	16	5	7	4	24	25	−1	19
6	Cleveland Internationals	16	5	9	2	23	26	−3	17
7	Fort Wayne Fever	16	5	9	2	15	26	−11	17
8	Cincinnati Kings	16	4	9	3	17	31	−14	15
9	Toronto Lynx	16	2	13	1	18	40	−22	7

==== Heartland Division ====
Pos	Team	Pld	W	L	T	GF	GA	GD	Pts
1	Des Moines Menace	16	11	1	4	35	13	+22	37
2	Thunder Bay Chill	16	8	3	5	27	16	+11	29
3	Real Colorado Foxes	16	8	5	3	28	19	+9	27
4	St. Louis Lions	16	6	4	6	29	25	+4	24
5	Rochester Thunder	16	5	10	1	21	25	−4	16
6	Kansas City Brass	16	4	9	3	28	37	−9	15
7	Springfield Demize	16	2	13	1	10	43	−33	7

=== Eastern Conference ===
==== Mid Atlantic Division ====
Pos	Team	Pld	W	L	T	GF	GA	GD	Pts
1	Reading Rage (R)	16	13	1	2	58	17	+41	41
2	Carolina Dynamo	16	10	4	2	38	19	+19	32
3	Cary Clarets	16	9	4	3	28	16	+12	30
4	Hampton Roads Piranhas	16	8	5	3	23	21	+2	27
5	West Virginia Chaos	16	5	8	3	23	37	−14	18
6	Fredericksburg Gunners	16	3	10	3	14	35	−21	12
7	Northern Virginia Royals	16	2	10	4	18	35	−17	10
8	Virginia Legacy	16	1	9	6	14	36	−22	9

(R) Regular Season Champions

==== Northeast Division ====
Pos	Team	Pld	W	L	T	GF	GA	GD	Pts
1	Ottawa Fury	16	12	0	4	48	8	+40	40
2	Long Island Rough Riders	16	12	2	2	32	10	+22	38
3	Ocean City Barons	16	9	4	3	31	15	+16	30
4	Brooklyn Knights	16	7	6	3	25	20	+5	24
5	Newark Ironbound Express	16	6	8	2	38	41	−3	20
6	Rhode Island Stingrays	16	4	9	3	23	41	−18	15
7	Westchester Flames	16	3	8	5	16	36	−20	14
8	New Hampshire Phantoms	16	3	9	4	20	32	−12	13
9	New Jersey Rangers	16	2	12	2	14	44	−30	8

=== Southern Conference ===
==== Mid South Division ====
Pos	Team	Pld	W	L	T	GF	GA	GD	Pts
1	Laredo Heat	16	7	1	8	29	18	+11	29
2	West Texas United Sockers	16	8	5	3	25	19	+6	27
3	Austin Aztex U23	16	7	4	5	32	27	+5	26
4	El Paso Patriots	16	8	6	2	27	22	+5	26
5	Rio Grande Valley Bravos	16	6	5	5	32	28	+4	23
6	DFW Tornados	16	5	7	4	29	33	−4	19
7	Houston Leones	16	0	13	3	10	37	−27	3

Note: Austin finish in third place as a result of winning the head-to-head season series 2–0–1 against El Paso.

==== Southeast Division ====
Pos	Team	Pld	W	L	T	GF	GA	GD	Pts
1	Mississippi Brilla	16	9	1	6	30	12	+18	33
2	Bradenton Academics	16	9	2	5	32	14	+18	32
3	New Orleans Jesters	16	5	0	11	24	13	+11	26
4	Panama City Pirates	16	6	5	5	23	21	+2	23
5	Baton Rouge Capitals	16	4	8	4	25	26	−1	16
6	Central Florida Kraze	16	4	9	3	18	31	−13	15
7	Nashville Metros	16	2	7	7	16	36	−20	13
8	Atlanta Blackhawks	16	3	10	3	16	31	−15	12

=== Western Conference ===
==== Northwest Division ====
Pos	Team	Pld	W	L	T	GF	GA	GD	Pts
1	Kitsap Pumas	16	12	1	3	40	13	+27	39
2	Portland Timbers U23's	16	11	3	2	43	20	+23	35
3	Seattle Wolves	16	10	3	3	29	18	+11	33
4	Cascade Surge	16	7	6	3	29	26	+3	24
5	Victoria Highlanders	16	6	6	4	37	25	+12	22
6	Vancouver Whitecaps Residency	16	6	7	3	26	22	+4	21
7	Tacoma Tide	16	5	7	4	34	40	−6	19
8	Abbotsford Mariners	16	4	10	2	28	36	−8	14
9	Yakima Reds	16	3	11	2	22	49	−27	11
10	Spokane Spiders	16	3	13	0	12	51	−39	9

==== Southwest Division ====
Pos	Team	Pld	W	L	T	GF	GA	GD	Pts
1	Hollywood United Hitmen	16	10	3	3	38	17	+21	33
2	Los Angeles Legends	16	9	3	4	34	15	+19	31
3	Ventura County Fusion	16	7	2	7	26	21	+5	28
4	BYU Cougars	16	7	5	4	21	22	−1	25
5	Fresno Fuego	16	6	6	4	30	28	+2	22
6	Southern California Seahorses	16	4	4	8	25	22	+3	20
7	Lancaster Rattlers	16	5	7	4	33	38	−5	19
8	Orange County Blue Star	16	5	7	4	20	25	−5	19
9	Ogden Outlaws	16	4	11	1	24	39	−15	13
10	Bakersfield Brigade	16	2	11	3	14	38	−24	9

== Playoffs ==
=== Format ===
The top three teams from each division earn playoff bids. The division champion earns a bye to the Division Finals and the rights to host. The second place team will host the third place team in the Division Semifinals either at their home field or at the division champion's field. The two notable exceptions were the Chicago Fire Premier hosting Forest City London in Fort Wayne, Indiana, and Ventura County Fusion hosting the Los Angeles Legends, despite Los Angeles having the higher seed.

=== Bracket ===
Divisional First Round	Divisional Finals
GL1	(Michigan) Kalamazoo Outrage	1
Great Lakes Division
GL2	(Illinois) Chicago Fire Premier	2
GL2	(Illinois) Chicago Fire Premier	1
GL3	(Ontario) Forest City London	0
NE1	(Ontario) Ottawa Fury	1
Northeast Division
NE3	(New Jersey) Ocean City Barons (AET)	2
NE2	(New York (state)) Long Island Rough Riders	0
NE3	(New Jersey) Ocean City Barons	2
HL1	(Iowa) Des Moines Menace	2
Heartland Division
HL3	Real Colorado Foxes	1
HL2	(Ontario) Thunder Bay Chill	0
HL3	Real Colorado Foxes	1
MA1	(Pennsylvania) Reading Rage	1
Mid-Atlantic Division
MA3	(North Carolina) Cary Clarets	2
MA2	(North Carolina) Carolina Dynamo	1
MA3	(North Carolina) Cary Clarets	3
MS1	(Texas) Laredo Heat (AET)	1
Mid-South Division
MS2	West Texas United Sockers	0
MS2	West Texas United Sockers	2
MS3	(Texas) Austin Aztex U23	1
Southern Conference
SE1	Mississippi Brilla	2
Southeast Division
SE2	(Florida) Bradenton Academics (AET)	3
SE2	(Florida) Bradenton Academics	1
SE3	(Louisiana) New Orleans Jesters	0
NW1	(Washington (state)) Kitsap Pumas	2
Northwest Division
NW3	(Washington (state)) Seattle Wolves	0
NW2	(Oregon) Portland Timbers U23's	2
NW3	(Washington (state)) Seattle Wolves	3
Western Conference
SW1	(California) Hollywood United Hitmen	1
Southwest Division
SW3	(California) Ventura County Fusion (AET)	3
SW2	(California) Los Angeles Legends	1
SW3	(California) Ventura County Fusion	2

Conference Finals
GL2	(Illinois) Chicago Fire Premier	3
NE3	(New Jersey) Ocean City Barons	0
HL1	(Iowa) Des Moines Menace	0
MA3	(North Carolina) Cary Clarets	1
MS1	(Texas) Laredo Heat (AET)	1
SE2	(Florida) Bradenton Academics	3
NW1	(Washington (state)) Kitsap Pumas	1
SW3	(California) Ventura County Fusion	2

PDL Semifinals
GL2	(Illinois) Chicago Fire Premier (AET)	2
MA3	(North Carolina) Cary Clarets	1
SE2	(Florida) Bradenton Academics	1
SW3	(California) Ventura County Fusion	6

PDL Championship
GL2	(Illinois) Chicago Fire Premier	1
SW3	(California) Ventura County Fusion	2

=== Divisional Semifinals ===
July 21, 2009
7:30 PM EDT

(North Carolina) Carolina Dynamo	1–3	(North Carolina) Cary Clarets
Rojo (yellow card) 32'; Shriver 66'; Roberts (yellow card) 70'	(Report)	Ibeagha (yellow card) 34'; Schilawski 59' 72'; Grossman (yellow card) 65'; O'Brien (yellow card) 68'; Petrasso 90'

Macpherson Stadium
Browns Summit, North Carolina
Referee: (USA)

July 22, 2009
8:00 PM EDT

(New York (state)) Long Island Rough Riders	0–2	(New Jersey) Ocean City Barons
	(Report)	Neptune (yellow card) 34'; Carmichael 23'; Noone 73'

Cy Donnelly Stadium
South Huntington, New York
Attendance: 436
Referee: Bill Renderos (USA)

July 22, 2009
8:30 PM CDT

West Texas United Sockers	2–1	(Texas) Austin Aztex U23
Rios (yellow card) 23'; Becerra (yellow card) 24'; Everson 46'; Furness 51' (yellow card) 59'; Franco (yellow card) 69'; James (yellow card) 90'	(Report)	McFayden 17' (yellow card) 42'; Helton (yellow card) 32'; Mirsky (yellow card) 71'

Grande Communications Stadium
Midland, Texas
Attendance: 1,460
Referee: Jonathan Johnson (USA)

July 23, 2009
2:00 PM PDT

(Oregon) Portland Timbers U23's	2–3	(Washington (state)) Seattle Wolves
Brown 6'; Youngblood 33'; Farfan (yellow card) 90'	(Report)	Chursky 30' 81' 90'; Zimmerman (yellow card) 52'

PGE Park
Portland, Oregon
Attendance: 235
Referee: David Grbavac (USA)

July 23, 2009
8:00 PM EDT

(Illinois) Chicago Fire Premier	1–0	(Ontario) Forest City London
Akpan 67'; Sinovic (yellow card) 69'	(Report)	Di Biase (yellow card) 70'

Hefner Soccer Complex
Fort Wayne, Indiana
Referee: David Jarzc (USA)

July 23, 2009
7:00 PM PDT

(California) Ventura County Fusion	2–1	(California) Los Angeles Legends
Motagalvan 7'; Hamilton 18'; Byrne (yellow card) 34'; Barrera (yellow card) 68'; Hill (yellow card) 80'	(Report)	Js. Barton (yellow card) 4'; Randolph (yellow card) 57'; Whitfield 77'

Bulldog Stadium
Ventura, California
Attendance: 560
Referee: Federico Figari (USA)

July 24, 2009
7:00 PM CDT

(Florida) Bradenton Academics	1–0	(Louisiana) New Orleans Jesters
Morris 34'; Hepple (red card) 88'; Kendall (yellow card) 90'	(Report)	Young (yellow card) 27'; Callon (yellow card) 59' (yellow-red card) 90'; Duncan (yellow card) 88'; Gledhill (yellow card) 90'

M&F Bank Stadium
Ridgeland, Mississippi
Attendance: 234
Referee: Justin Brown (USA)

July 24, 2009
7:30 PM CDT

(Ontario) Thunder Bay Chill	0–1	Real Colorado Foxes
Neto (yellow card) 16'; Bukoski (yellow card) 51'; Putrus (yellow card) 77'; Abolaji (yellow card) 77'	(Report)	Donaldson (yellow card) 26'; Cephers 49'; Jennings (yellow card) 51'; Stisser (yellow card) 87'

Valley Stadium
West Des Moines, Iowa
Attendance: 161
Referee: Hidajet Tica (USA)

=== Divisional Finals ===
July 25, 2009
3:00 PM PDT

(California) Hollywood United Hitmen	1–3 (AET)	(California) Ventura County Fusion
Hazdovac 26'	(Report)	Byrne 35'; Barrera (yellow card) 96'; Myerson 105' 117'; Becerra (yellow card) 111'

Stadium by the Sea
Los Angeles, California
Attendance: 358
Referee: Steve Elliott (USA)

July 25, 2009
7:00 PM EDT

(Pennsylvania) Reading Rage	1–2	(North Carolina) Cary Clarets
Mulholland (yellow card) 15'; Bienenfeld (yellow card) 45'; Hogan (yellow card) 54'; Wheeler 57'; Burke (red card) 86'	(Report)	Minogue (yellow card) 19'; Ibeagha (yellow card) 21'; Petrasso (yellow card) 35'; Drake 60'; Brown (yellow card) 64'; Lassiter (red card) 69'; 90' (OG)

Don Thomas Stadium
Reading, Pennsylvania
Attendance: 518
Referee: Tim Snyder (USA)

July 25, 2009
7:00 PM EDT

(Ontario) Ottawa Fury	1–2 (AET)	(New Jersey) Ocean City Barons
Maloney 7'; Pradié (yellow card) 63'; Schippers (yellow card) 104'	(Report)	Richter (yellow card) 35'; Melchionni (yellow card) 45'; Noone (yellow card) 45' (goal) 60'; Bellamy 98'

Algonquin College Soccer Complex
Ottawa, Ontario
Attendance: 780
Referee: Senussi Ali (USA)

July 25, 2009
7:30 PM EDT

(Michigan) Kalamazoo Outrage	1–2	(Illinois) Chicago Fire Premier
Oatley 58'; Lima (yellow card) 83'	(Report)	Cutshaw 67' (PK); Edgar 77'

Loy Norrix High School
Kalamazoo, Michigan
Attendance: 530
Referee: Jason White (USA)

July 25, 2009
7:00 PM CDT

Mississippi Brilla	2–3 (AET)	(Florida) Bradenton Academics
Hunt 33'; Lawrence (yellow card) 41'; Paulini (yellow card) 75'; Lilly 90+'; Lemma (red card) 90+'	(Report)	Lopes 22'; Boggs (yellow card) 45' (goal) 85'; Williams (yellow card) 53'; Reis (yellow card) 77'; Ingvarsson (yellow card) 91'; Morris 99'; McFarland (yellow card) 120'

Harper Davis Field
Jackson, Mississippi
Attendance: 1,806
Referee: Thai Huynh (USA)

July 25, 2009
7:30 PM CDT

(Iowa) Des Moines Menace	2–1	Real Colorado Foxes
Jordan 27' (PK); Salem 38'; Schmoker (yellow card) 41'; Pearson (yellow card) 62'; Jordan (yellow card) 78'	(Report)	Donaldson 4' (PK) (yellow card) 11'; Werth (yellow card) 88'; Salvaggione (yellow card) 90'

Valley Stadium
West Des Moines, Iowa
Attendance: 3,683
Referee: Dan Cataldi (USA)

July 25, 2009
8:15 CDT

(Texas) Laredo Heat	1–0 (AET)	West Texas United Sockers
Ordaz (yellow card) 50'; Mulamba (yellow card) 74'; Ramos 119'	(Report)	Collazo (yellow card) 5'; Furness (yellow card) 36'; Everson (yellow card) 45'; Steven (yellow card) 115'

Texas A&M International University Soccer Complex
Laredo, Texas
Attendance: 1,425
Referee: Courtney Jackson (USA)

July 25, 2009
7:30 PM PDT

(Washington (state)) Kitsap Pumas	2–0	(Washington (state)) Seattle Wolves
Phillips 15' 71'	(Report)	Bates (yellow card) 41'; Morris (yellow card) 51'; Scott (yellow card) 90'

Bremerton Memorial Stadium
Bremerton, Washington
Attendance: 2,329
Referee: Jeremy Hanson (USA)

=== Conference Finals ===
July 31, 2009
5:00 PM CDT

(Illinois) Chicago Fire Premier	3–0	(New Jersey) Ocean City Barons
Blades 18' (yellow card) 75'; Braun 66'; Akpan (yellow card) 75'; Cutshaw 76'	(Report)	Carmichael (yellow card) 38'; Banks (yellow card) 73'; K. Miller (yellow card) 79'; Chapman (red card) 88'

Valley Stadium
West Des Moines, Iowa
Attendance: 3,633
Referee: Doug Wolff (USA)

July 31, 2009
5:30 PM CDT

(Washington (state)) Kitsap Pumas	1–2	(California) Ventura County Fusion
Lipset 45'; Mohn (yellow card) 51'	(Report)	Hamilton 26'; Aghasyan (yellow card) 83'; López 92+' (yellow card) 92+'

Texas A&M International University Soccer Complex
Laredo, Texas
Attendance: 55
Referee: Jorge Luna Hernandez (USA)

July 31, 2009
7:30 PM CDT

(Iowa) Des Moines Menace	0–1	(North Carolina) Cary Clarets
Schmoker (yellow card) 48'; Salem (yellow card) 74'; Mujdzic (yellow card) 28'	(Report)	Fitzgerald (yellow card) 28'; Brown (yellow card) 48'; Grossman 70'; Drake (yellow card) 79'; Ibeagha (red card) 90'

Valley Stadium
West Des Moines, Iowa
Attendance: 3,633
Referee: George Major (USA)

July 31, 2009
8:30 PM CDT

(Texas) Laredo Heat	1–3 (AET)	(Florida) Bradenton Academics
Mulamba (yellow card) 19'; Quinones 57' (yellow card) 120'; Bautista (yellow card) 68'; Infante (yellow card) 97'; Perez (red card) 113'	(Report)	McFarland (yellow card) 19'; Hepple 20'; Reis (yellow card) 63'; Voutier (yellow card) 87'; Morris 116'; Lopes 120'

Texas A&M International University Soccer Complex
Laredo, Texas
Attendance: 1,498
Referee: John Lohr (USA)

=== PDL Semifinals ===
August 1, 2009
7:30 PM CDT

(Illinois) Chicago Fire Premier	2–1 (AET)	(North Carolina) Cary Clarets
Braun 38'; Rice (yellow card) 63'; Rodriguez (coach) (red card) 67'; Akpan 95'	(Report)	Drake 63' (PK); Grossman (yellow card) 65'; O'Brien (yellow card) 99'; Petrasso (yellow card) 105'; Bouemboue (red card) 110'; Willis (red card) 120'; Gutierrez (coach) (red card) 120'

Valley Stadium
West Des Moines, Iowa
Attendance: 206
Referee: Landis Wiley (USA)

August 1, 2009
8:15 PM CDT

(Florida) Bradenton Academics	1–6	(California) Ventura County Fusion
Lopes 35'; Reis (yellow card) 45'	(Report)	Guzman (yellow card) 27'; López 38'; Becerra 40'; Hamilton 45' 54'; Barrera 53'; Guerrero (yellow card) 62'; Aghasyan 90'

Texas A&M International University Soccer Complex
Laredo, Texas
Attendance: 101
Referee: Andrew Gage (USA)

=== PDL Championship ===
August 8, 2009
7:00 PM PDT

(California) Ventura County Fusion	2–1	(Illinois) Chicago Fire Premier
Becerra 8'; Guzman (red card) 33'; Smarte (yellow card) 35'; Mikkelsen (coach) (red card) 60'; Motagalvan (yellow card) 70' (goal) 92+'; Smith (coach) (red card) 92+'	(Report)	Blades (yellow card) 47'; Akpan 74'; Sunderland (coach) (red card) 90'

Bulldog Stadium
Ventura, California
Attendance: 3,512
Referee: Alejandro Mariscal (USA)

Championship MVP: (United States) Rodrigo López (VCF)

== Award Winners and Finalists ==
The awards finalists, Goalkeeper of the Year, and All-League teams were announced on August 4, 2009, with the winners announced on August 6.

=== Most Valuable Player ===
- (United States) Aaron Wheeler, F, Reading Rage (Winner)
- (United States) Tom Oatley, F, Kalamazoo Outrage
- (Nigeria) Debola Ogunseye, F, Mississippi Brilla

=== U19 Player of the Year ===
- (United States) Christian Ibeagha, D, Cary Clarets (Winner)
- (United States) Sheanon Williams, D, Carolina Dynamo
- (Haiti) Max Touloute, F, Fort Wayne Fever

=== Defender of the Year ===
- (United States) Christian Ibeagha, Cary Clarets (Winner)
- (Kenya) Bonivenger Misiko, Fort Wayne Fever
- (United States) Daniel Scott, Seattle Wolves
- (Wales) Chris Williams, New Orleans Jesters

=== Goalkeeper of the Year ===
- (United States) Jimmy Maurer, Chicago Fire Premier

=== Coach of the Year ===
- (United States) Casey Mann, Des Moines Menace (Winner)
- (United States) Dan Fisher, Long Island Rough Riders
- (England) Mark Spooner, Kalamazoo Outrage
- (United States) Brent Whitfield, Los Angeles Legends

== All-League and All-Conference Teams ==
=== Central Conference ===
F: (United States) Andre Akpan, CHI; (United States) Teal Bunbury, ROC; (United States) Tom Oatley*, KAL
M: (United States) Dave Hertel*, MIC; (United States) Nolan Intermoia, TB; (United States) Brad Stisser, COL
D: (Canada) Anthony Di Biase, LON; (Kenya) Bonivenger Misiko*, FW; (Brazil) Wilson Neto, TB; (United States) Brian Wurst, KC
G: (United States) Jimmy Maurer*, CHI
Honorable Mention: (United States) Justin Ferguson, D, SPR; (Kenya) Saidi Isaac, F, IND; (United States) David Mueller, D, SL; (United States) Armin Mujdzic, F, DM; (Zambia) Yoram Mwila, M, CLE; (United States) Kyle Segebart, D, CIN; (Canada) Jordan Webb, M, TOR

=== Eastern Conference ===
F: (United States) Cody Arnoux, CAR; (England) Adam Arthur, WV; (United States) Aaron Wheeler*, REA
M: (Canada) Will Beague*, OTT; (United States) Adam Gazda, REA; (United States) Zach Loyd, CAR
D: (Canada) Brien Chamney, OTT; (United States) Christian Ibeagha*, CRY; (Puerto Rico) Rich Martinez, LI; (United States) Sheanon Williams, CAR
G: (United States) Tunde Ogunbiyi, OCC
Honorable Mention: (United States) Frank Alesci, M, BRK; (United States) Zachary Carr, G, NJ; (Jamaica) Kevon Harris, M, HR; (United States) Sean Kelley, G, NV; (United States) Michael Konicoff, M, WCH; (Haiti) Jerrod Laventure, F, NWK; (United States) Ken Manaham, G, FRB; (United States) Matthew Marcin, M, RI; (United States) Timothy Murray, G, NH; (United States) Ian Stowe, M, VIR

=== Southern Conference ===
F: (United States) Zak Boggs, BRD; (Mexico) Salvador Luna, RGV; (Nigeria) Debola Ogunseye*, MIS
M: (Mexico) Danny Galvan, LAR; (South Africa) Gregory Mulamba, LAR; (England) Gary Stopforth, NO
D: (United States) Jamie Cunningham, AUS; (Trinidad and Tobago) Dwyane Demmin, MIS; (England) Thomas Wharf, PAN; (Wales) Chris Williams*, NO
G: (Honduras) Ryan Cooper, LAR
Honorable Mention: (United States) Jay Ambrosy, M, HOU; (United States) Lief Craddock, G, WTU; (Brazil) Janrai Gravely, G, DFW; (Croatia) Tommy Krizanovic, F, CF; (Guadeloupe) Wilfrid Loizeau, M, ATL; (Brazil) Felipe Lowall, M, BR; (United States) Ryan McDonald, D, NAS; (Mexico) Jorge Muniz, G, EP

=== Western Conference ===
F: (United States) Rory Agu, TAC; (United States) Brent Whitfield, LA; (United States) Ryan Youngblood, POR
M: (United States) Ely Allen, SEA; (Serbia) Tomislav Colic, SC; (United States) Michael Farfan, LA; (Mexico) Armando Ochoa*, HU
D: (United States) Nick Cardenas, OGD; (United States) Mark Lee, KIT; (United States) Dan Scott*, SEA
G: (United States) Dustyn Brim, KIT
Honorable Mention: (United States) Richie Bindrup, M, BYU; (United States) Zach Brunner, G, LAN; (Trinidad and Tobago) Jason Devinish, M, VIC; (Canada) Gagan Dosanjh, M, VAN; (United States) Eddie Gutierrez, M, FRE; (United States) Anthony Hamilton, F, VEN; (United States) Jacob Hustedt, M, BAK; (Canada) Kristjan Johannson, G, ABB; (United States) Kristopher Minton, G, ORC; (Brazil) Vinicius Oliveira, F, YAK; (United States) John Prugh, F, SPO; (United States) Steve Reese, G, CSC

* denotes All-League selection

== See also ==
- United Soccer Leagues 2009
- 2009 W-League Season
