= 2011 PDL season =

USL Premier Development League
- Official 2011 PDL Championship logo
- Season: 2011
- Champions: Kitsap Pumas (1st Title)
- Regular Season Champions: Fresno Fuego (1st Title)
- Matches: 512
- Goals: 1,643 (3.21 per match)
- Best Player: (United States) Milton Blanco Fresno Fuego
- Top goalscorer: (United States) Jake Keegan Westchester Flames (16 Goals)
- Best goalkeeper: (United States) Mitch Hildebrandt Michigan Bucks
- Biggest home win: 7–1, Real Colorado Foxes over Springfield Demize
- Biggest away win: 11–1 Jersey Express S.C. over Brooklyn Knights
- Highest scoring: 12 goals, Jersey Express S.C. 11–1 Brooklyn Knights

The 2011 USL Premier Development League season was the 17th season of the PDL. The regular season began on April 29, 2011, when the Los Angeles Blues 23 played Fresno Fuego, and ended on July 24. The league consisted of 64 teams across nine divisions with the addition of the South Atlantic division. The playoffs began on Tuesday, July 26 and concluded with the PDL Championship Game on August 6. As in previous years, the PDL Championship Game was broadcast live on Fox Soccer Channel in the United States, with commentary by Steve Bell and Keith Tabatznik.

The Kitsap Pumas ended the season as national champions, beating Laredo Heat 1–0 in the 2011 PDL Championship game. The playoffs were held at the home of the Pumas in Bremerton, Washington.

Fresno Fuego had the best regular-season record, posting an unbeaten 13–0–3 record. Fresno midfielder Milton Blanco was named League MVP, after leading the league in points (38) and assists (14) and helping his team to the Southwest Division title. Two Michigan Bucks players - Stewart Givens and Mitch Hildebrandt - were given end-of-season awards as Defender of the Year and Goalkeeper of the Year respectively, while their coach Gary Parsons was named Coach of the Year. Jake Keegan of the Westchester Flames was named Rookie of the Year after tallying 16 goals in 16 games to take the league goal-scoring crown. Keegan accounted for 64 percent of Westchester's goals in 2011 and also finished third in the league in points with 34.

== Changes from 2010 ==
=== Name changes ===
- Hampton Roads Piranhas rebranded as Virginia Beach Piranhas
- Los Angeles Azul Legends rebranded as Los Angeles Misioneros
- Newark Ironbound Express rebranded as Jersey Express

=== New franchise ===
- Ten franchises were announced as joining the league this year:

Team name	Metro area	Location	Previous affiliation
(Ohio) Akron Summit Assault	Akron area	Akron, OH	expansion
(Virginia) Fredericksburg Hotspur	Fredericksburg area	Fredericksburg, VA	expansion
(Ontario) Hamilton Rage	Hamilton area	Hamilton, ON	expansion
(Florida) FC Jax Destroyers	Jacksonville area	Jacksonville, FL	expansion
(California) Los Angeles Blues 23	West Los Angeles area	Pacific Palisades, CA	expansion
(Washington (state)) North Sound SeaWolves	Snohomish County area	Everett, WA	expansion
Real Maryland Monarchs	Montgomery County area	Rockville, MD	from USL Second Division
(Texas) Rio Grande Valley Grandes	Rio Grande Valley area	Edinburg, TX	expansion
(Kentucky) River City Rovers	Louisville area	Louisville, KY	expansion
(Manitoba) WSA Winnipeg	Winnipeg area	Winnipeg, MB	expansion

=== Folding/moving ===
- Thirteen teams were announced as leaving the league prior to the beginning of the season:
  - Albany BWP Highlanders - Schenectady, New York
  - Atlanta Blackhawks - Alpharetta, Georgia
  - Cleveland Internationals - Medina, Ohio
  - Dayton Dutch Lions - Bellbrook, Ohio - left to join USL Pro
  - DFW Tornados - Frisco, Texas
  - Hollywood United Hitmen - Los Angeles, California - left to join National Premier Soccer League
  - Houston Leones - Richmond, Texas
  - Kalamazoo Outrage - Kalamazoo, Michigan
  - Lancaster Rattlers - Lancaster, California - left to join National Premier Soccer League
  - Rio Grande Valley Bravos - Brownsville, Texas - left to join Southern Premier Soccer League, changed name to RGV Ocelots
  - Rochester Thunder - Rochester, Minnesota
  - Spokane Spiders - Spokane, Washington
  - Yakima Reds - Yakima, Washington

== Standings ==
Key to colours in group tables
Team won the Division Title
Team qualified for playoff berth

Note: The first tie-breaker in PDL standings is head-to-head results between teams tied on points, which is why some teams with inferior goal differences finish ahead in the standings.

=== Central Conference ===
==== Great Lakes Division ====
Pos	Team	Pld	W	L	T	GF	GA	GD	Pts
1	Michigan Bucks	16	12	2	2	38	9	+29	38
2	Chicago Fire Premier	16	11	3	2	28	10	+18	35
3	Forest City London	16	9	5	2	32	23	+9	29
4	Indiana Invaders	16	6	7	3	25	26	−1	21
5	Akron Summit Assault	16	5	8	3	23	28	−5	18
6	Hamilton Rage	16	5	8	3	20	27	−7	18
7	Toronto Lynx	16	5	9	2	15	25	−10	17
8	Cincinnati Kings	16	2	7	7	23	33	−10	13
9	River City Rovers	16	2	8	6	16	37	−21	12

==== Heartland Division ====
Pos	Team	Pld	W	L	T	GF	GA	GD	Pts
1	Thunder Bay Chill	16	12	2	2	31	9	+22	38
2	Des Moines Menace	16	12	4	0	41	20	+21	36
3	Real Colorado Foxes	16	11	2	3	49	23	+26	36
4	Kansas City Brass	16	4	8	4	28	36	−8	16
5	St. Louis Lions	16	4	7	5	25	24	+1	13 (Note: St. Louis Lions deducted four points for league rules infringement.)
6	WSA Winnipeg	16	3	12	1	15	44	−29	10
7	Springfield Demize	16	1	12	3	12	45	−33	6

=== Eastern Conference ===
==== Mid Atlantic Division ====
Pos	Team	Pld	W	L	T	GF	GA	GD	Pts
1	Long Island Rough Riders	16	12	1	3	42	13	+29	39
2	Reading United	16	12	2	2	41	14	+27	38
3	Jersey Express	16	11	2	3	45	12	+33	36
4	Westchester Flames	16	6	6	4	25	33	−8	22
5	Central Jersey Spartans	16	4	8	4	24	31	−7	16
6	Bermuda Hogges	16	4	9	3	17	31	−14	15
7	Ocean City Nor'easters	16	2	6	8	20	25	−5	14
8	New Jersey Rangers	16	5	10	1	15	32	−17	12 (Note: New Jersey Rangers deducted four points for league rules infringement.)
9	Brooklyn Knights	16	1	13	2	15	53	−38	5

==== Northeast Division ====
Pos	Team	Pld	W	L	T	GF	GA	GD	Pts
1	MPS Portland Phoenix	16	8	3	5	24	11	+13	29
2	New Hampshire Phantoms	16	7	6	3	25	20	+5	24
3	Western Mass Pioneers	16	6	5	5	18	20	−2	23
4	Ottawa Fury	16	4	7	5	22	31	−9	17
5	Vermont Voltage	16	3	7	6	12	21	−9	15

==== South Atlantic Division ====
Pos	Team	Pld	W	L	T	GF	GA	GD	Pts
1	Carolina Dynamo	16	11	4	1	37	14	+23	34
2	Northern Virginia Royals	16	10	5	1	20	13	+7	31
3	Real Maryland Monarchs	16	8	6	2	29	20	+9	26
4	West Virginia Chaos	16	7	5	4	32	23	+9	25
5	Virginia Beach Piranhas	16	3	10	3	13	32	−19	12
6	Fredericksburg Hotspur	16	2	11	3	10	39	−29	9

=== Southern Conference ===
==== Mid South Division ====
Pos	Team	Pld	W	L	T	GF	GA	GD	Pts
1	Laredo Heat	16	11	3	2	35	13	+22	35
2	Chivas El Paso Patriots	16	10	3	3	24	22	+2	33
3	Baton Rouge Capitals	16	8	7	1	26	20	+6	25
4	New Orleans Jesters	16	7	7	2	23	27	−4	23
5	West Texas United Sockers	16	5	11	0	20	35	−15	15
6	Rio Grande Valley Grandes	16	3	11	2	19	29	−10	11

==== Southeast Division ====
Pos	Team	Pld	W	L	T	GF	GA	GD	Pts
1	Mississippi Brilla	16	12	2	2	39	14	+25	38
2	Central Florida Kraze	16	11	3	2	34	23	+11	35
3	Bradenton Academics	16	8	6	2	34	27	+7	26
4	Jax Destroyers	16	3	9	4	22	37	−15	13
5	Nashville Metros	16	3	10	3	15	31	−16	12
6	Fort Lauderdale Schulz Academy	16	2	11	3	17	30	−13	9

=== Western Conference ===
==== Northwest Division ====
Pos	Team	Pld	W	L	T	GF	GA	GD	Pts
1	Kitsap Pumas	16	12	1	3	42	9	+33	35 (Note: Kitsap Pumas deducted four points for league rules infringement.)
2	Victoria Highlanders	16	9	4	3	29	16	+13	30
3	Vancouver Whitecaps Residency	16	8	5	3	24	21	+3	27
4	Portland Timbers U23's	16	6	6	4	34	21	+13	22
5	Abbotsford Mariners	16	6	7	3	22	25	−3	21
6	North Sound SeaWolves	16	4	8	4	20	34	−14	16
7	Washington Crossfire	16	3	8	5	22	39	−17	14
8	Tacoma Tide	16	1	10	5	21	49	−28	8

==== Southwest Division ====
Pos	Team	Pld	W	L	T	GF	GA	GD	Pts
1	Fresno Fuego (R)	16	13	0	3	43	15	+28	42
2	Ventura County Fusion	16	10	0	6	38	10	+28	36
3	Orange County Blue Star	16	9	5	2	45	31	+14	29
4	Southern California Seahorses	16	8	5	3	22	24	−2	27
5	BYU Cougars	16	4	8	4	15	21	−6	16
6	Los Angeles Blues 23	16	4	10	2	17	37	−20	14
7	Ogden Outlaws	16	2	10	4	18	36	−18	10
8	Los Angeles Misioneros	16	1	13	2	16	40	−24	5

(R) Regular Season Champions

== League post-season tournament ==
=== Division matches for qualification ===
Northeast Division; Eastern Conference
NE1	MPS Portland Phoenix	0
NE2	New Hampshire Phantoms	1

Mid Atlantic Division; Eastern Conference
MA2	Reading United	0
MA3	Jersey Express	1

South Atlantic Division; Eastern Conference
SA1	Carolina Dynamo	1
SA2	Northern Virginia Royals	0

Great Lakes Division; Central Conference
GL2	Chicago Fire Premier	3
GL3	Forest City London	0

=== Bracket ===
Conference Semifinals
SE1	Mississippi Brilla	3
MS2	Chivas El Paso Patriots	0
Southern Conference
MS1	Laredo Heat	1
SE2	Central Florida Kraze	0
MA1	Long Island Rough Riders	3
NE2	New Hampshire Phantoms	1
Eastern Conference
MA3	Jersey Express	2
SA1	Carolina Dynamo	1
SW1	Fresno Fuego	3
NW2	Victoria Highlanders	1
Western Conference
NW1	Kitsap Pumas	1
SW2	Ventura County Fusion	0
GL1	Michigan Bucks	3
HL2	Des Moines Menace	2
Central Conference
HL1	Thunder Bay Chill	1
GL2	Chicago Fire Premier	0

Conference Finals
SE1	Mississippi Brilla	2 (6)
MS1	Laredo Heat	2 (7)
MA1	Long Island Rough Riders	3
MA3	Jersey Express	2
SW1	Fresno Fuego	0
NW1	Kitsap Pumas	1
GL1	Michigan Bucks	1
HL1	Thunder Bay Chill	2

Semi-Finals
MS1	Laredo Heat	4
MA1	Long Island Rough Riders	1
NW1	Kitsap Pumas	3
HL1	Thunder Bay Chill	1

Finals
MS1	Laredo Heat	0
NW1	Kitsap Pumas	1

=== Conference Quarterfinals ===
July 26, 2011
7:00PM EST

(Illinois) Chicago Fire Premier	3–0	(Ontario) Forest City London
Vaz 37' 68'; Mallace 51'	Report 1 Report 2	Ivanovic (yellow card) 31'; Hemming (yellow card) 57'; Bibby (yellow card) 59'; Dillon (yellow card) 74'

Toyota Park
Bridgeview, IL
Attendance: 50
Referee: Miguel Panduro Jr. (USA)

July 26, 2011
7:00PM EST

(North Carolina) Carolina Dynamo	1–0	Northern Virginia Royals
Ibeagha (yellow card) 18'; Lovejoy 24'	Report	Smith (yellow card) 45'; O'Reilly (yellow card) 62'; Sheta (yellow card) 75'; Onwuka (yellow card) 87'

Macpherson Stadium
Browns Summit, NC
Attendance: 2,519
Referee: Danny Thornberry (USA)

July 26, 2011
8:00PM EST

(Pennsylvania) Reading United	0–1	(New Jersey) Jersey Express
	Report	Youhill 50'; Dacres (yellow card) 88'; Niouky (yellow card) 90+'

Don Thomas Stadium
Reading, PA
Attendance: 300
Referee: John Douglas (USA)

July 26, 2011
8:15PM EST

(Maine) MPS Portland Phoenix	0–1	New Hampshire Phantoms
Theissen (yellow card) 70'; Massie (yellow card) 70'	Report	Tsonis 32'; Schram (yellow card) 51'; Hilton (yellow card)

Memorial Stadium
Portland, ME
Attendance: 300
Referee: Guido Gonzalez (USA)

=== Conference semifinals ===
July 29, 2011
5:30PM EDT

(New Jersey) Jersey Express	2–1	(North Carolina) Carolina Dynamo
Niouky 27' (yellow card) 33'; Coulibaly 33'; Konopelsky (yellow card) 52'; Rodrigues (red card) 90'	Report	Tweed-Kent 38'; Delbono (yellow card) 78'; Robinson (red card) 90'

Cy Donnelly Stadium
South Huntington, NY
Attendance: 145
Referee: Yevgeniy Mednikov (USA)

July 29, 2011
5:30PM EDT

(Ontario) Thunder Bay Chill	1–0	(Illinois) Chicago Fire Premier
Gonzalez 37'; Putrus (yellow card) 27'; Pereira (yellow card) 55'; Neto (yellow card) 81'; Intermoia (yellow card) 90'	Report	Raj (yellow card) 65'

Ultimate Soccer Arenas
Pontiac, MI
Referee: Giuseppi Agusta (USA)

July 29, 2011
6:00PM EDT

(Texas) Laredo Heat	1–0	Central Florida Kraze
Galvan (yellow card) 45'; Ibarra 55'; Lara (yellow card) 90'	Report	Tshimpaka (yellow card) 21'; Centofanti (yellow card) 67'; Mendoza (yellow card) 76'; Gutierrez (yellow card) 90'

Harper Davis Stadium
Jackson, MS
Referee: Thaj Huynh (USA)

July 29, 2011
8:00 PM EDT

(New York (state)) Long Island Rough Riders	3–1	New Hampshire Phantoms
Sarle 18' 27' 53'	Report	Adam 43'; DeDeus (red card) 60'; Goodwin (yellow card) 73'

Cy Donnelly Stadium
South Huntington, NY
Attendance: 387
Referee: Hernan Aguilar (USA)

July 29, 2011
8:00PM EDT

Michigan Bucks	3–2 (AET)	(Iowa) Des Moines Menace
Catalano 90'; Alashe 105'; Caldwell 111'	Report 1 Report 2	Sosa 45' 103'

Ultimate Soccer Arenas
Pontiac, MI
Attendance: 944
Referee: Marc Lawrence (USA)

July 29, 2011
8:30PM EDT

Mississippi Brilla	3–0	(Texas) Chivas El Paso Patriots
Aduny 11'; Reis (yellow card) 21'; Luak 30'; Azira (yellow card) 57'; Palmer 74'	Report 1 Report 2	Salas (yellow card) 35'; Garvia (yellow card) 52'

Harper Davis Stadium
Jackson, MS
Attendance: 1,412
Referee: Jack Damrill (USA)

July 30, 2011
1:00 PM EDT

(Washington (state)) Kitsap Pumas	1–0	(California) Ventura County Fusion
Burke 11'; Besagno (yellow card) 56'; Scott (yellow card) 59'; Meredith (yellow card) 90'	Report 1 Report 2	Barrera (yellow card) 62'; Singh (yellow card) 88'

Chukchansi Park
Fresno, CA
Referee: Ezequiel Molina (USA)

July 30, 2011
3:30 PM EDT

(California) Fresno Fuego	3–1	(British Columbia) Victoria Highlanders
Reinhart 10' 83' 90'	Report 1 Report 2	Dixon 19'; Vamdenbodmen (yellow card) 43'; Voegeli (yellow card) 72'; Burbrary (yellow card) 90'

Chukchansi Park
Fresno, CA
Attendance: 2,369
Referee: Chris Hutchison (USA)

=== Conference finals ===
July 30, 2011
5:00PM EDT

(New York (state)) Long Island Rough Riders	3–2	(New Jersey) Jersey Express
Detelj 7'; Sarle 33'; Mulligan (yellow card) 52'; Arikian (yellow card) 66'; Barea (yellow card) 69' (goal) 84'	Report	Edwards (yellow card) 43'; Ovenseri 50' 56'; Niouky (yellow card) 90'

Cy Donnelly Stadium
South Huntington, NY
Attendance: 826
Referee: Ayodeji Obisesan (USA)

July 30, 2011
7:30PM EDT

Michigan Bucks	1–2	(Ontario) Thunder Bay Chill
Givens 11'; Caldwell (yellow card) 84'; Hunt (yellow card) 90+'	Report	Oliveira 8'; Pereira (yellow card) 49'; Robertson (yellow card) 82'; Neto 86' (yellow card) 86'; Vilalva (yellow card) 90+'

Ultimate Soccer Arenas
Pontiac, MI
Attendance: 796
Referee: Artem Sher (USA)

July 30, 2011
8:30PM EDT

Mississippi Brilla	2–2 (AET)	(Texas) Laredo Heat
Buffington (yellow card) 31'; Palmer 90+'; Luak 97'	Report 1 Report 2	Garcia 11' (yellow card) 36'; Mulamba (red card) 37'; Ordaz (yellow card) 45'; Ibarra (yellow card) 76'; Collozo (red card) 76'; Frias (yellow card) 78'; Estrada (yellow card) 81'; Fuentes (yellow card) 102'; Begines 116'
Penalties
	6–7

Harper Davis Stadium
Jackson, MS
Attendance: 1,027
Referee: Jared Peeler (USA)

July 31, 2011
3:00PM EDT

(California) Fresno Fuego	0–1	(Washington (state)) Kitsap Pumas
Cignetti (yellow card) 49'; Grousis (yellow card) 60'	Report 1 Report 2 Report 3	Hyde (yellow card) 8' (yellow-red card) 90' (goal) 89'; Besagno (yellow card) 35'

Chukchansi Park
Fresno, CA
Attendance: 2,573
Referee: Said Ravenfar (USA)

=== PDL Semifinals ===
August 5, 2011
8:00PM EDT

(New York (state)) Long Island Rough Riders	1–4	(Texas) Laredo Heat
Gabriele 69'; Lopez (yellow card) 69'; Sarle (yellow card) 70' (yellow-red card) 77'; Hole (yellow card) 82'	Report 1 Report 2	Bayona 38'; Ibarra 64'; Lopez 85'; Escovar 90'

Bremerton Memorial Stadium
Bremerton, WA
Attendance: 1,122
Referee: Ezequiel Molina (USA)

August 5, 2011
10:30PM EDT

(Washington (state)) Kitsap Pumas	3–1	(Ontario) Thunder Bay Chill
Burke 60'; Friesen 72' 90'	Report 1 Report 2	Robertson (yellow card) 8'; Oliveira 34'; Petrus (yellow card) 47'

Bremerton Memorial Stadium
Bremerton, WA
Attendance: 1,400
Referee: (USA)

=== PDL Final ===
August 6, 2011
7:30PM EDT

(Washington (state)) Kitsap Pumas	1–0	(Texas) Laredo Heat
Christner 11'	Report

Bremerton Memorial Stadium
Bremerton, WA
Attendance: 1,257
Referee: (USA)

Championship MVP: (United States) Bryan Burke (KIT)

== Award Winners and Finalists ==
MVP: (United States) Milton Blanco (FRE) (winner), (United States) Mitch Hildebrandt (MIC), (United States) Chandler Hoffman (OCB)
Rookie of the Year: (Australia) Albert Edward (RCR), (United States) Brian Holt (REA), (United States) Jake Keegan (WES) (winner)
Defender of the Year: (United States) Dillon Barna (VCF), (United States) Stewart Givens (MIC) (winner), (Brazil) Wilson Neto (TBC)
Goalkeeper of the Year: (United States) Mitch Hildebrandt (MIC)
Coach of the Year: (Canada) Tony Colistro (TBC), (United States) Pete Fewing (KIT), (United States) Gary Parsons (MIC) (winner)

== All-League and All-Conference teams ==
=== Eastern Conference ===
F: (Turkey) Hakan Ilhan (CAR), (United States) Jake Keegan (WES)*, (United States) Dominick Sarle (LIR)
M: (Bermuda) Keishen Bean (BER), (England) Jason Massie (POR), (Ghana) Stephen Okai (REA)
D: (United States) Matthew Baker (REA), (United States) Brian Fekete (POR), (England) Shaun Foster (JER), (United States) Kyle Manscuk (OTT)
G: (United States) Brian Holt (REA)

=== Central Conference ===
F: (United States) Adam Mena (IND), (United States) Branden Stelmak (CIN), (United States) Brandon Swartzendruber (TBC)
M: (United States) Tom Catalano (MIC), (Australia) Albert Edward (RCR), (Colombia) John Sosa (DMM)*
D: (United States) Kevin Cope (CHI), (United States) Stewart Givens (MIC)*, (New Zealand) Jonathan Raj (CHI), (Brazil) Wilson Neto (TBC)*
G: (United States) Mitch Hildebrandt (MIC)*

=== Southern Conference ===
F: (Uganda) Moses Aduny (MIS), (Colombia) Esteban Bayona (LAR), (France) Achille Campion (BRC)
M: (Uganda) Michael Azira (MIS), (United States) Enrique Cervantes (EPP), (Colombia) Jonathan Mendoza (CFK)*
D: (Mexico) Carlos Ordaz (LAR), (Brazil) Guilherme Reis (BRD), (England) Daniel Sackman (CFK), (Mexico) Hugo Samano Contreras (EPP)
G: (Jamaica) Keneil Baker (CFK)

=== Western Conference ===
F: (United States) Milton Blanco (FRE)*, (United States) Chandler Hoffman (OCB)*, (United States) Brent Richards (POR)
M: (United States) Danny Barrera (VCF)*, (United States) Nikolas Besagno (KIT), (United States) Jose Cuevas (FRE)
D: (United States) Dillon Barna (VCF)*, (United States) Fernando De Alba (LAB), (United States) Ryan Kawulok (POR), (United States) Daniel Scott (KIT)*
G. (United States) Bryan Meredith (KIT)

* denotes All-League player

== See also ==
- 2011 USL Pro season
- 2011 W-League Season
