= Student Activity Complex =

Sports and arts complex in Laredo, Texas

Coordinates: 27.497918°N 99.437428°W

- The SAC
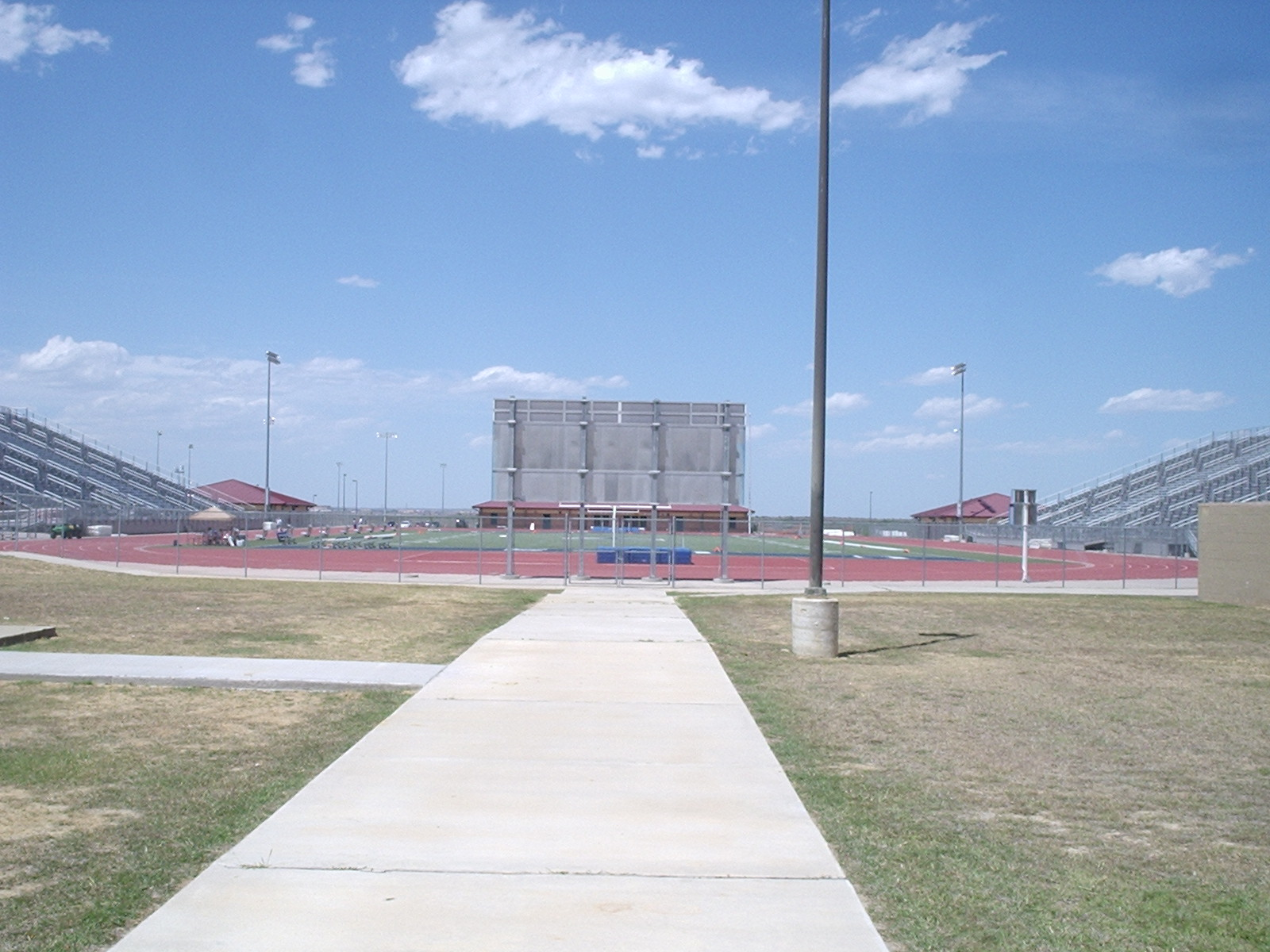
- Interactive map of Student Activity Complex
- Location: 5208 St. Claudia Lane Laredo, Texas 78040
- Owner: UISD
- Operator: UISD
- Capacity: 8,500
- Surface: FieldTurf

Construction
- Opened: 2004

Tenants
- Alexander H.S. 2004- Johnson H.S. 2004- United H.S. 2004- United South H.S. 2004- Laredo Heat (PDL) 2004-2007

The Student Activity Complex is a soccer, track and field and football stadium and performing arts auditorium in Laredo, Texas owned by the United Independent School District. The complex is better known outside of South Texas as the home stadium for PDL 2007 champion franchise Laredo Heat until 2007 when the franchise moved to the Texas A&M International University Soccer Complex. The stadium also serves as home and away to UISD schools. It is home to the Alexander Bulldogs, LBJ Wolves, United Longhorns, and the United South Panthers. The auditorium is located next to the stadium which is used for band concerts, drama, and other related attractions.

== Gallery ==
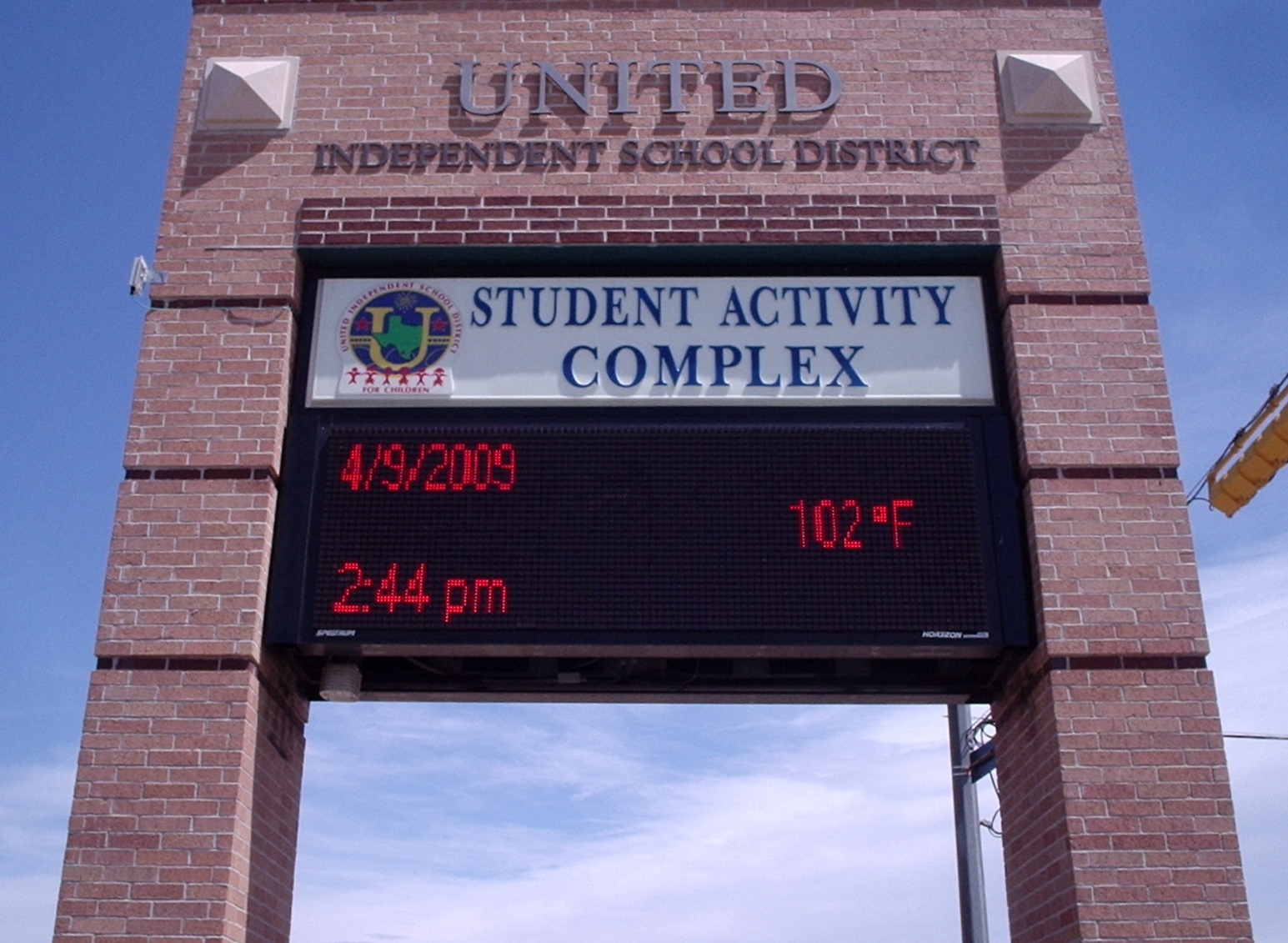
SAC Entrance

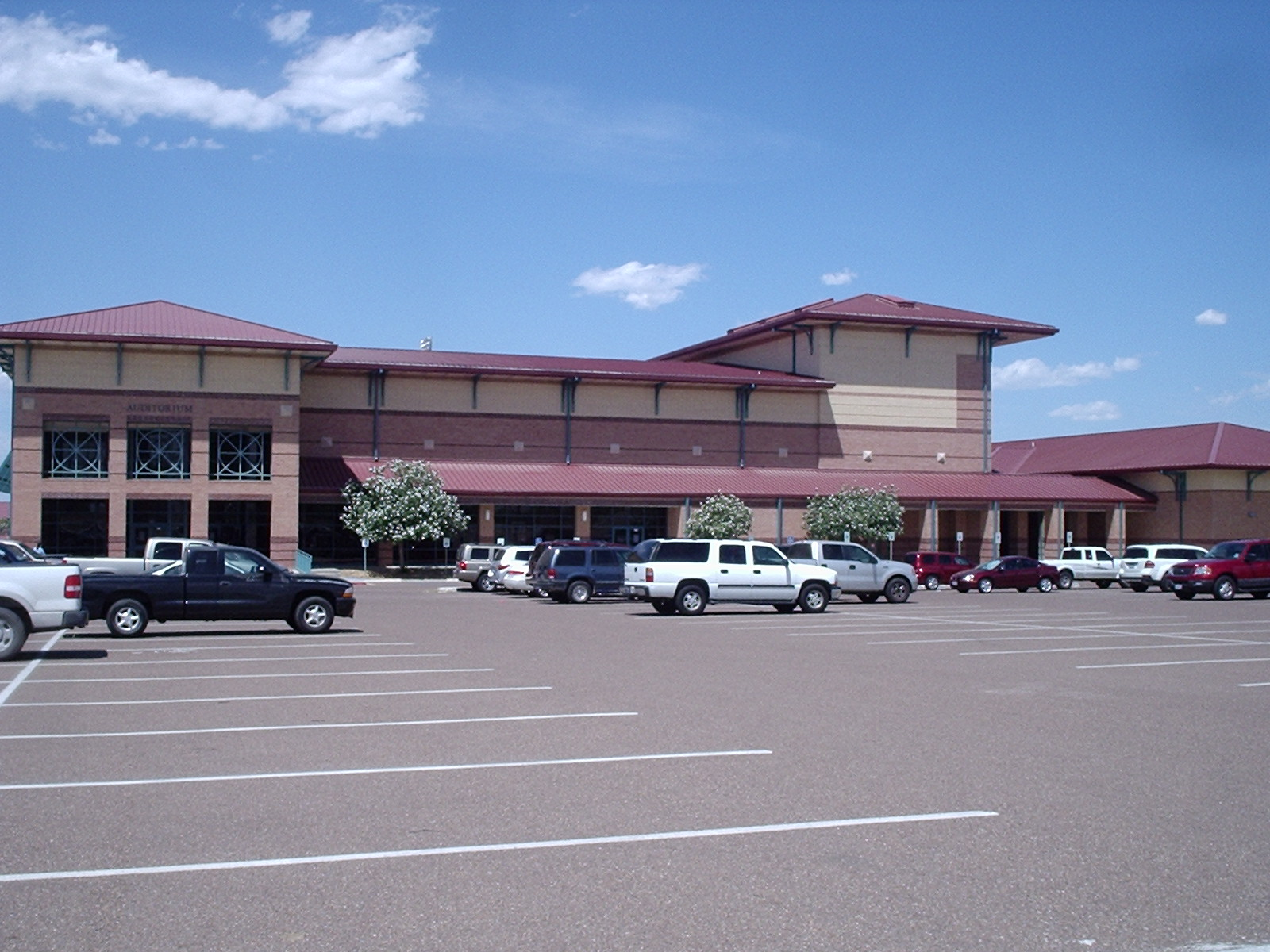
SAC Auditorium
