= Scott Caldwell =

American soccer player (born 1991)

Personal information
- Full name: Scott Caldwell
- Date of birth: March 15, 1991 (age 35)
- Place of birth: Weymouth, Massachusetts, United States
- Height: 5 ft 8 in (1.73 m)
- Position: Defensive midfielder

Youth career
- 2004–2006: South Shore United Blazers
- 2006–2008: IMG Soccer Academy
- 2008–2009: New England Revolution

College career
Years	Team	Apps	(Gls)
2009–2012	Akron Zips		

Senior career*
Years	Team	Apps	(Gls)
2010	Michigan Bucks	3	(0)
2011	Central Jersey Spartans	7	(3)
2011	Akron Summit Assault	8	(2)
2012	Michigan Bucks	4	(1)
2013–2021	New England Revolution	229	(5)
2022–2023	Real Salt Lake	30	(0)
Total		281	(11)

International career^{‡}
2006–2008	United States U17	9	(0)
2009	United States U18	3	(0)
- * Club domestic league appearances and goals as of May 7, 2023 ‡ National team caps and goals as of March 18, 2013

Scott Caldwell (born March 15, 1991) is an American former professional soccer player who played as a midfielder.

== Career ==
=== Youth, college and amateur ===
Caldwell spent a year with the New England Revolution academy, making six appearances in 2008-09 while rehabbing injuries. On February 9, 2009, it was announced that Caldwell committed to the University of Akron. In his freshman year, Caldwell made 19 appearances and went 2-for-2 in penalty kicks at the College Cup. In 2010, he made 24 appearances and scored five goals, including a game winner in the NCAA College Cup final against Louisville to capture the school's first ever national title in any sport. He also recorded an assist that year and was named Most Outstanding Offensive Player at the College Cup and Academic All-MAC. In his junior year, Caldwell finished first on the team in assists and second in points. He made 23 appearances and finished the year with six goals and 11 assists on his way to being named NSCAA All-America Third Team, CoSIDA Academic All-America Second Team, First Team All-MAC, Academic All-MAC and All-Ohio team. In his senior year, he led the team in points with 28. Appearing in 22 games and scoring nine goals and 10 assists on his way to being named NSCAA All-America First Team, NSCAA All-American Scholar Player of the Year, Mid-American Conference Player of the Year, Soccer America MVP First Team, Top Drawer Soccer's Team of the Season First Team, CoSIDA Academic All-America First Team, All-MAC First Team and Academic All-MAC.

During his college years, Caldwell also played in the USL Premier Development League for the Michigan Bucks, the Central Jersey Spartans and the Akron Summit Assault.

=== Professional ===
On December 21, 2012, Caldwell signed with MLS club New England Revolution the second Homegrown Player in club history. He made his professional debut for the club on March 16, 2013, in a 1–0 defeat on the road against the Philadelphia Union. He recorded his first career assist on June 29, 2013, setting up Chad Barrett's equalizing goal in a 1-1 draw with Chivas USA.

Caldwell scored his first MLS career goal on April 25, 2015, the fourth in the Revolution's 4-0 win over Real Salt Lake. He led the Revolution in matches started and minutes played for the 2015 season, and was named Revolution Team MVP and Revolution Player's Player of the Year.

Caldwell was named Revolution Humanitarian of the Year for the 2019 season.

at the end of the 2021 MLS Season Caldwell's contract was not picked up after nine years at the Revolution. His last appearance for the club was October 20 with an 89th-minute substitution in a 2–3 win on the road at DC United. His last start for the club was also a 2–3 win away to Chicago Fire on September 22, a match in which he made his 175th MLS career start, and the Revolution set a club record for single-season wins with 18.

On January 12, 2022, Caldwell signed as a free agent with Real Salt Lake on a two-year deal. He played in 26 matches for the club in the 2022 season, making 15 starts. He also appeared in the 2022 MLS Cup Playoffs First round, coming on as an 84th minute substitute for Pablo Ruiz, and committing a handball in the 90+2 minute, setting up Austin FC's equalizing goal. Caldwell started 3 matches in the 2023 season, announcing his retirement at the end of the season.

== Personal ==
His father Larry Caldwell played for the Rhode Island Oceaneers in the American Soccer League in 1974, as well as for the Hartford Bicentennials in the North American Soccer League in 1975. Caldwell made history in 2019 by becoming the first active professional athlete to ever march in the Boston Pride Parade.

== Career statistics ==
=== Club ===
As of match played May 7, 2023

Appearances and goals by club, season and competition
Club	Season	League			National cup		Continental		Other		Total	
Club	Season	Division	Apps	Goals	Apps	Goals	Apps	Goals	Apps	Goals	Apps	Goals
Michigan Bucks	2010	PDL	3	0	—		—		—		3	0
Central Jersey Spartans	2011	PDL	7	3	—		—		—		7	3
Akron Summit Assault	2011	PDL	8	2	—		—		—		8	2
Michigan Bucks	2012	PDL	4	1	2	0	—		—		6	1
Michigan Bucks	Total		7	1	2	0	0	0	—	—	9	1
New England Revolution	2013	MLS	29	0	2	0	2 (Note: Appearance(s) in MLS Cup Playoffs)	0	—		33	0
New England Revolution	2014	MLS	26	0	3	0	5	0	—		34	0
New England Revolution	2015	MLS	34	2	1	0	1	0	—		36	2
New England Revolution	2016	MLS	32	0	5	0	—		—		37	0
New England Revolution	2017	MLS	33	1	2	0	—		—		35	1
New England Revolution	2018	MLS	24	2	1	0	—		—		35	2
New England Revolution	2019	MLS	20	0	2	0	1	0	—		23	0
New England Revolution	2020	MLS	18	0	—		4	0	—		22	0
New England Revolution	2021	MLS	13	0	0	0	0	0	—		13	0
New England Revolution	Total		229	5	16	0	13	0	—	—	258	5
Real Salt Lake	2022	MLS	26	0	1	0	1	0	1 (Note: Appearance(s) in Leagues Cup)	0	29	0
Real Salt Lake	2023	MLS	4	0	1	0	0	0	0	0	5	0
Real Salt Lake	Total		30	0	2	0	1	0	1	0	34	0
Career total			281	11	20	0	14	0	1	0	316	11

== Honors ==
Individual

- New England Revolution Most Valuable Player: 2015

University of Akron

- NCAA College Cup (1): 2010
- MAC Conference Tournament Champions (3): 2009, 2010, 2012
- MAC Conference Regular Season Champions (4): 2009, 2010, 2011, 2012

New England Revolution

- Supporters' Shield: 2021
