= Rio Grande Valley Grandes =

Soccer team in Texas, US

- Full name: Rio Grande Valley Grandes Futbol Club
- Nickname: Grandes
- Founded: 2010
- Ground: Edinburg Field; Edinburg, Texas
- Capacity: 4000
- Owner: (United States) Jose Ignacio Larraga
- Head Coach: Vacant
- League: USL Premier Development League
- 2011: 6th, Mid South; Playoffs: DNQ
- Website: Official website
Home colors	Away colors	Third colors

Rio Grande Valley Grandes was an American soccer team based in Edinburg, Texas, United States. Founded in 2010, the team played in the USL Premier Development League (PDL), the fourth tier of the American Soccer Pyramid, in the Mid South Division of the Southern Conference. The team played its home games at Edinburg Field in nearby Edinburg, Texas. The team's colors were white, blue and gold. The team folded after its first season in 2011.

== History ==
The Grandes were awarded a PDL franchise on January 18, 2011 following the demise of their predecessor, the Rio Grande Valley Bravos, which had their franchise terminated by the USL Premier Development League in October 2010 when the club’s interim owner was unable to complete his financial obligations to the league. The team was officially announced as a USL Premier Development League expansion franchise on February 18, 2011.

The team played its first competitive game on May 6, 2011, a 5-1 loss to Laredo Heat. The first goal in franchise history was scored by Alfonso Cavazos.

== Players ==
=== Roster ===
As of June 4, 2011.

Note: Flags indicate national team as defined under FIFA eligibility rules; some limited exceptions apply. Players may hold more than one non-FIFA nationality.

No.	Pos.	Nation	Player
1	GK	USA	Juan Gamboa
2	MF	MEX	Eduardo Alvarez
3	DF	MEX	Omar Apodaca
4	DF	ENG	Brian Hardie
5	DF	MEX	Kristoffer Medina
6	MF	USA	Olaff Mina
7	MF	MEX	Alexandro Gonzalez
8	DF	MEX	David Oteo
9	FW	MEX	Alfonso Cavazos
10	FW	USA	Juan Nava
11	MF	USA	Esteban Ariel Barraza
12	MF	USA	Jesus Mireles
13	DF	USA	Jairo Castillo

No.	Pos.	Nation	Player
14	MF	MEX	Oscar Valencia
15	MF	USA	Jorge Cantu
16	MF	MEX	Mario Perez
17	DF	USA	Jesus Pena
18	DF	USA	Vivian Garza
19	MF	SWE	Fredrik Ekvall
22	DF	MEX	Mario Zamora
23	MF	MEX	Noe de los Santos
24	MF	MEX	Misael Lopez
00	GK	USA	Irving Martinez
—	MF	USA	Robert Alexe
—	MF	MEX	Guillermo Flamarique
—	MF	USA	James Stansberry

== Year-by-year ==
Year	Division	League	Regular season	Playoffs	Open Cup
2011	4	USL PDL	6th, Mid South	Did not qualify	Did not qualify

== Head coaches ==
- (Scotland) Gary Hamilton (2011)

== Stadia ==
- Edinburg Field; Edinburg, Texas (2011–present)

== Average attendance ==
Attendance stats are calculated by averaging each team's self-reported home attendances from the historical match archive at United Soccer Leagues (USL).

- 2011: to be announced
