= Neil Cassidy =

Neil Cassidy and similar spellings may refer to:

- Neil Cassidy (soccer), coach of the Rochester Thunder
- Neal Cassady, writer
- Neal Cassidy, fictional character in Once Upon a Time
