= Barry Rice (soccer) =

American soccer player

Personal information
- Full name: Barry LaShawn Rice Jr.III
- Date of birth: September 23, 1987 (age 39)
- Place of birth: Euclid, Ohio, United States
- Height: 1.80 m (5 ft 11 in)
- Position: Defender

Team information
- Current team: Akron Summit Assault
- Number: 21

Youth career
- 2006–2009: Kentucky Wildcats

Senior career*
Years	Team	Apps	(Gls)
2009	Chicago Fire Premier	13	(2)
2010	D.C. United	2	(0)
2011–	Akron Summit Assault	3	(0)
- * Club domestic league appearances and goals as of July 11, 2011

Barry LaShawn Rice Jr. (born September 23, 1987, in Euclid, Ohio) is an American soccer player who currently plays for Akron Summit Assault in the USL Premier Development League.

== Club career ==
On March 25, 2010, D.C. United officially announced the signing of Rice after he spent the off-season with the club. His contract option was not picked up by D.C. United at the end of the 2010 MLS season.

== Honors ==
=== University of Kentucky ===
- C-USA All-Freshman Team: 2006
- C-USA All-Tournament Team: 2006
- C-USA Defensive Player of the Year: 2007, 2008
- C-USA All First-Team: 2007, 2008
- NSCAA All-Region First-Team : 2007, 2008
- NCSAA All-Region First-Team : 2007, 2008
