= Paul Moran (soccer) =

American soccer player

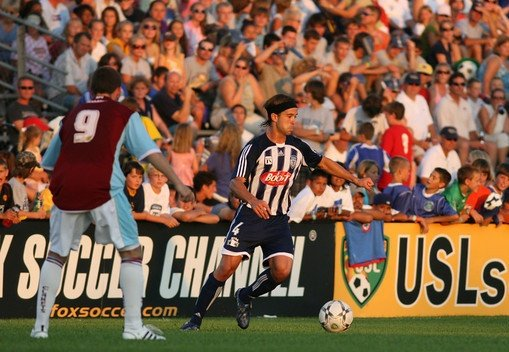

Personal information
- Date of birth: May 16, 1983 (age 43)
- Place of birth: Redwood City, California, United States
- Height: 5 ft 11 in (1.80 m)
- Position: Defender

Team information
- Current team: Rochester Thunder
- Number: 4

Youth career
- Palo Alto Pumas

College career
Years	Team	Apps	(Gls)
2001–2002	Santa Clara Broncos		
2003	Fresno State Bulldogs		
2004–2005	Fresno Pacific Sunbirds	34	(2)

Senior career*
Years	Team	Apps	(Gls)
2004–2006	Fresno Fuego	32	(3)
2007	Montreal Impact	0	(0)
2007	→ Trois-Rivieres Attak (loan)	4	(4)
2008	Minnesota Thunder	5	(0)
2009–	Rochester Thunder	8	(0)
- * Club domestic league appearances and goals as of 14 June 2009

Paul Moran (born May 16, 1983, in Redwood City, California) is an American soccer player who currently plays for Rochester Thunder in the USL Premier Development League.

== Career ==
=== Youth and college ===
Moran grew up in the San Francisco Bay Area playing for the Palo Alto Pumas which won the 2002 Dallas Cup. He graduated from Bellarmine College Prep. In 2001, he entered Santa Clara University, playing on the men's soccer team in 2001 and 2002. He transferred to Fresno State University for the 2003 season, then to Fresno Pacific University for the 2004 and 2005 seasons.

During his college years he also spent three seasons with Fresno Fuego in the USL Premier Development League.

=== Professional ===
Moran signed with the Montreal Impact of the USL First Division on May 10, 2007, but he was released a month later having never appeared with the first team, and later played four games on loan with the Trois-Rivieres Attak in the Canadian Soccer League.

On March 11, 2008, he signed a one-year contract with an option for a second year with the Minnesota Thunder of the USL First Division.

In 2009 Moran signed with Minnesota's development team, Rochester Thunder, in their inaugural campaign in the USL Premier Development League.
