= Texas A&M International Dustdevils =

- University: Texas A&M International University
- Conference: LSC (primary)
- NCAA: Division II
- Athletic director: Griz Zimmermann
- Location: Laredo, Texas
- Varsity teams: 13 (5 men's, 6 women's, 2 co-ed)
- Basketball arena: TAMIU Kinesiology and Convocation Building
- Baseball stadium: Jorge Haynes Field
- Softball stadium: Dustdevil Softball Field
- Soccer stadium: Dustdevil Soccer Field
- Mascot: Dusty
- Nickname: Dustdevils
- Colors: Maroon and silver
- Website: godustdevils.com
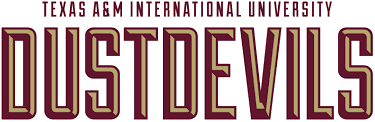

The Texas A&M International Dustdevils are the athletic teams that represent the Texas A&M International University, located in Laredo, Texas, in intercollegiate sports as a member of the Division II level of the National Collegiate Athletic Association (NCAA), primarily competing in the Lone Star Conference (LSC) since the 2019–20 academic year. The Dustdevils previously competed in the D-II Heartland Conference from 2006–07 to 2018–19; and in the Red River Athletic Conference (RRAC) of the National Association of Intercollegiate Athletics (NAIA) from 2002–03 to 2005–06.

== Varsity teams ==
TAMIU competes in 13 intercollegiate varsity sports: Men's sports included baseball, basketball, cross country, golf and soccer; while women's sports include basketball, cross country, golf, soccer, softball and volleyball; and co-ed sports include cheerleading and dance.

== History ==
=== Conference championships ===
- Men's basketball (2010 and 2013 Heartland Conference Tournament Championship)
- Women's basketball (2013 Heartland Conference Champions)
- Men's soccer (2003 Red River Athletic Conference Champions, 2010 Heartland Conference Title)
- Women's volleyball (2002 West Division Athletics Conference Champions)
- Softball (2010 Heartland Conference Tournament Championship)
