= Ole Mikkelsen =

Norwegian-American soccer forward (born 1959)

Personal information
- Full name: Ole S. Mikkelsen
- Date of birth: April 8, 1959 (age 67)
- Place of birth: Norway
- Height: 5 ft 11 in (1.80 m)
- Position: Forward

College career
Years	Team	Apps	(Gls)
1977–1980	UCLA Bruins	100	(82)

Senior career*
Years	Team	Apps	(Gls)
1980	Maccabee Athletic Club		
1981	Washington Diplomats	16	(1)
1982	San Jose Earthquakes	9	(0)
1983–1985	Los Angeles Lazers (indoor)	31	(4)
1987	Los Angeles Heat	?	(2)

Managerial career
- 2008–2009: Ventura County Fusion (assistant)
- 2010 - 2012: Ventura County Fusion
- * Club domestic league appearances and goals

Ole Mikkelsen (born April 8, 1959, in Los Angeles, California) is a Norwegian-born American businessman and former soccer manager and forward. He played in both the North American Soccer League, Major Indoor Soccer League and Western Soccer Alliance during his career. He was formerly the head coach with the Ventura County Fusion and currently Vice President of Information Technology at Mentor Corporation.

Mikkelsen attended UCLA where he majored in Scandinavian languages and played on the men's soccer team from 1977 to 1980. He was a 1978 First Team All American soccer player. In 1980, he played for Maccabee Athletic Club. In 1981, the Washington Diplomats selected Mikkelsen in the first round (13th overall) of the North American Soccer League draft. The Diplomats folded at the end of the season and in October 1981, the Fort Lauderdale Strikers selected Mikkelsen in the dispersal draft. The Strikers released Mikkelsen during the preseason and he signed with the San Jose Earthquakes for the 1982 season. He then moved to the Los Angeles Lazers of the Major Indoor Soccer League for two seasons. In 1987, he played for the Los Angeles Heat of the Western Soccer Alliance.

He later worked for Amgen before joining Mentor Corporation where he is the Vice President of Information Technology. In 2008, he replaced Rudy Ybarra as the assistant coach with the Ventura County Fusion of the Premier Development League.

He is a member of the 2022 class of the UCLA Athletics Hall of Fame.
