= Atlanta Blackhawks =

- Full name: FC Atlanta Blackhawks
- Nickname: Blackhawks
- Founded: 2009
- Dissolved: 2010
- Ground: Alpharetta High School; Alpharetta, Georgia
- Owner: (United States) Massoud Roushandel
- Head Coach: (United States) Massoud Roushandel
- League: USL Premier Development League
- 2010: 3rd, Southeast; Playoffs: DNQ
| Home colors | Away colors |

Atlanta Blackhawks was an American soccer team based in Atlanta, Georgia, United States. Founded in 2009, the team played in the USL Premier Development League (PDL), the fourth tier of the American Soccer Pyramid, in the Southeast Division of the Southern Conference. The franchise folded at the end of the 2010 season and left the league thereafter.

The team played its home games in the stadium at Alpharetta High School in nearby Alpharetta, Georgia. The team's colors were black and white.

== History ==
The Blackhawks joined the PDL in 2009, and played their first ever game on May 9, 2009, away at Mississippi Brilla. The Blackhawks lost game 2–1, with the first goal in franchise history being scored by Babayele Sodade.

== Players ==
=== Final roster ===
This list is a historical record of the final group of players on the last Blackhawks roster for their final game in August 2010.

Note: Flags indicate national team as defined under FIFA eligibility rules; some limited exceptions apply. Players may hold more than one non-FIFA nationality.

| No. | Pos. | Nation | Player |
|---|---|---|---|
| 1 | GK | USA | Jimmy Maurer |
| 2 | MF | USA | Caleb Suri |
| 3 | DF | USA | Connor Barbaree |
| 4 | DF | USA | Natt Slober |
| 5 | DF | RSA | Kyle Timm |
| 6 | DF | USA | Hunter Hayes |
| 7 | MF | USA | Kevin Sawchak |
| 8 | FW | USA | Jon Cox |
| 9 | DF | USA | Sam Arthur |
| 10 | MF | USA | Jeff Scannella |
| 11 | FW | USA | Blake Brettschneider |
| 13 | MF | GAM | Samsideen Badjic |
| 14 | MF | USA | Alex Caskey |
| 15 | MF | USA | Nick Burton |

| No. | Pos. | Nation | Player |
|---|---|---|---|
| 16 | FW | CIV | Ben Tayi |
| 17 | FW | MTN | Alhagi Touré |
| 18 | DF | GAM | Ebrima Njie |
| 19 | MF | USA | Matt Hoskins |
| 20 | FW | ENG | Daniel Waymont |
| 21 | FW | ENG | Ryan Maloney |
| 22 | DF | USA | Boubacar Toure |
| 23 | GK | USA | Will Whorton |
| 24 | FW | USA | Fode Diallo |
| 26 | DF | USA | Corey Adamson |
| 27 | GK | USA | Carl Woszczynski |
| 33 | MF | USA | Ryan Roushandel |
| — | MF | TTO | Yannick Pilgrim |

=== Notable former players ===
This list of notable former players comprises players who went on to play professional soccer after playing for the team in the Premier Development League, or those who previously played professionally before joining the team.

- (United States) Blake Brettschneider
- (United States) Alex Caskey
- (United States) Troy Cole
- (United States) Sean Johnson
- (Guadeloupe) Wilfrid Loizeau
- (China) Long Tan
- (United States) Carl Woszczynski

== Year-by-year ==
| Year | Division | League | Regular season | Playoffs | Open Cup |
|---|---|---|---|---|---|
| 2009 | 4 | USL PDL | 8th, Southeast | Did not qualify | Did not qualify |
| 2010 | 4 | USL PDL | 3rd, Southeast | Did not qualify | Did not qualify |

== Coaches ==
- (United States) Massoud Roushandel (2009–2010)
- (United States) Trent Orndorf GK Coach (2009–2010)
