= Mississippi Brilla FC =

Mississippi Brilla
- Full name: Mississippi Brilla Futbol Club
- Nickname: Brilla
- Founded: 2006; 20 years ago
- Stadium: Robinson-Hale Stadium; Clinton, Mississippi
- Capacity: 8,500
- Owner: Rusty Bryant
- Head Coach: Michael Azira
- League: USL League Two
- 2023: 4th, Mid South Division; Playoffs: DNQ
- Website: brillasoccer.org
Home colors

Mississippi Brilla Futbol Club is an amateur American soccer club based in Clinton, Mississippi, United States. Founded in 2006, the team plays in the USL League Two. The team's colors are sky blue, navy and white.

Brilla is associated with Brilla Soccer Ministries, an organization that undertakes sports ministry to share Christianity through the sport. The club’s name is derived from the Spanish word for "shine," and references the biblical passage Matthew 5:16, which says, "Therefore, let your light so shine before men that they may see your good works and glorify your Father who is in heaven."

Brilla has become one of the strongest PDL franchises in the Southeast on the pitch, winning their division regular season title in 2009, 2010, 2011, 2015, and 2021. In 2017, the club had their best showing in the playoffs, winning the Southern Conference championship and advancing to the PDL Semi-finals.

== History ==
Mississippi Brilla entered the PDL in 2007 to a great deal of fanfare, as the first soccer franchise in Mississippi since the demise of the Jackson Chargers in 1999. Under head coach Dave Dixon, Brilla tied their first game 1-1 at home to New Orleans Shell Shockers in front of over 1,000 fans, with the honor of the first goal in franchise history going to James Gledhill. Although the average attendance remained high throughout the season, the on-field results were not quite as impressive. Brilla won their first game next time out, 1-0 over DFW Tornados, but then failed to register a victory in their next four games. In the end, too many ties caused Brilla's downfall - 5 on the season - and despite some impressive results, including a 5-1 win over the Baton Rouge Capitals in June and 5-0 win over the Nashville Metros in July, it was not quite enough to make the playoffs, and they eventually finished their freshman year fourth behind divisional (and eventual national) champions Laredo Heat. James Gledhill was the team's top scorer, with six goals, while Chris Rash and Tripp Harkins led the assists stats with three apiece.

Brilla's second season in the PDL was pretty much on an equal footing with their first. With new head coach Steve DeCou at the helm, attendances remained high, often topping 900 fans per game, and the team enjoyed a number of exciting victories, including a hard-fought 2-0 win over the eventual divisional champions Austin Aztex U23, a 2-1 come-from-behind victory over New Orleans Shell Shockers in mid-June, and a 6-2 final day victory at home against Houston Leones in which Tripp Harkins scored a brace. As was the case in 2007, however, Brilla's downfall was a lack of consistency, and their inability to string a series of results together to gain momentum: their longest streak was a 5-game run in late June and early which included three wins and two ties, including the aforementioned victory over New Orleans. Mississippi ended the season in 4th place in the Mid South Division, just four points out of the playoffs, and with plenty to build on in 2009. Phillip Buffington was the team's most prolific goalscorer, with 8 for the season.

In 2009 Brilla had its most successful start in team history. Brilla qualified for the U.S. Open Cup for the first time in franchise history by going undefeated in their first four games, winning three and drawing one.

== Players and staff ==
=== Head coach ===
- (Uganda) Michael Azira (2023–Present)

=== Notable players ===
This list of notable players comprises players who have gone on to play professional soccer after playing for the team, or those who previously played professionally before joining the team.

- (Bosnia and Herzegovina) Emir Alihodžić
- (Uganda) Michael Azira
- (United States) Kharlton Belmar
- (England) Richard Bryan
- (Brazil) Gui Brandao
- (United States) Kyle Clinton
- (United States) Kyle Culbertson
- (Trinidad and Tobago) Craig Demmin
- (Trinidad and Tobago) Dwyane Demmin
- (Jamaica) Richard Dixon
- (United States) Devon Fisher
- (Turks and Caicos Islands) Billy Forbes
- (United States) Kaelon Fox
- (United States) J. J. Greer
- (United States) Kellen Gulley
- (Algeria) Chakib Hocine
- (United States) Willie Hunt
- (United States) Oscar Jimenez
- (United States) Alec Kann
- (Honduras) Angelo Kelly-Rosales
- (England) Macauley King
- (United States) Jake Leeker
- (Scotland) David Lilly
- (Lesotho) Napo Matsoso
- (United States) Brendan Moore
- (Nigeria) Debola Ogunseye
- (Argentina) Lucas Paulini
- (United States) Kyle Segebart
- (England) Jordan Skelton
- (United States) Bryce Taylor
- (French Guiana) Thomas Vancaeyezeele

=== Former head coaches ===
- (United States) Matt Horth (2022)
- (United States) Luke Sanford (2019-2021)
- (Scotland) Mark McKeever (2015-2018)
- (United States) Drew Courtney (2013-2014)
- (United States) Dave Dixon (2007, 2009–2012)
- (United States) Steve DeCou (2008)

== Year-by-year ==
Year	Division	League	Regular season	Playoffs	US Open Cup	Avg. attendance
2007	4	USL PDL	4th, Mid South	did not qualify	did not qualify	1,019 (7th in PDL)
2008	4	USL PDL	4th, Mid South	did not qualify	did not qualify	935 (10th in PDL)
2009	4	USL PDL	1st, Southeast	Divisional Finals	1st Round	852 (14th in PDL)
2010	4	USL PDL	1st, Southeast	Conference Semifinals	did not qualify	839 (13th in PDL)
2011	4	USL PDL	1st, Southeast	Conference Finals	did not qualify	732 (14th in PDL)
2012	4	USL PDL	4th, Southeast	did not qualify	1st Round	502 (18th in PDL)
2013	4	USL PDL	5th, Southeast	did not qualify	did not qualify	564 (20th in PDL)
2014	4	USL PDL	4th, Mid South	did not qualify	did not qualify	597 (17th in PDL)
2015	4	USL PDL	1st, Mid South	Conference Semifinals	did not qualify	709 (9th in PDL)
2016	4	USL PDL	3rd, Mid South	did not qualify	2nd Round	—
2017	4	USL PDL	2nd, Mid South	National Semifinals	did not qualify	—
2018	4	USL PDL	2nd, Deep South	did not qualify	3rd Round	—
2019	4	USL League Two	3rd, Deep South	did not qualify	did not qualify	—
2020	4	USL League Two	Season cancelled due to COVID-19 pandemic			
2021	4	USL League Two	1st, Mid South	Conference Semifinals	did not qualify	—
2022	4	USL League Two	2nd, Mid South	did not qualify	did not qualify	—
2023	4	USL League Two	4th, Mid South	did not qualify	did not qualify	—
2024	4	USL League Two	3rd, Mid South	did not qualify	did not qualify	—
2025	4	USL League Two	7th, Mid South	did not qualify	did not qualify	—
2026	4	USL League Two	3rd, Mid South	did not qualify	did not qualify	—

== Honors ==
- USL PDL Southeast Division champions 2009
- USL PDL Southeast Division champions 2010
- USL PDL Southeast Division champions 2011
- USL PDL Mid South Division champions 2015
- USL PDL Southern Conference champions 2017
- USL League Two Mid South Division champions 2021

== Stadium ==
- Robert P. Longabaugh Field; Mississippi College; Clinton, Mississippi (2007-2009)
- Harper Davis Stadium; Millsaps College; Jackson, Mississippi (2007, 2010–2012)
- M&F Bank Stadium (Freedom Ridge Park); Ridgeland, Mississippi (2 games in 2008-2009)
- Traceway Park, Clinton, Mississippi (4 games in 2015, 2016)
- Arrow Field at Clinton High School; Clinton, Mississippi (3 games in 2008-2010, 2013–2015, 2017-2025)
- Robinson-Hale Stadium Clinton, Mississippi (2026–Present)

== Supporters ==
The Mississippi Brilla supporter club is The Blue Battalion, founded in 2015. The Battalion tailgate before each home game and bring passion and noise to match days. Each home game the group selects their player of the game, who signs the large Blue Battalion flag.

== Broadcasts ==
Each Mississippi Brilla home game is broadcast live on YouTube and also kept there for on demand viewing.
