= Javier Santana =

Dominican footballer (born 1988)

Personal information
- Full name: Starlin Javier Santana Moncion
- Date of birth: October 16, 1988 (age 38)
- Place of birth: Palo Verde, Monte Cristi, Dominican Republic
- Position: Midfielder

Youth career
- 1999–2002: FC Spreitenbach
- 2002–2006: FC Zurich

Senior career*
Years	Team	Apps	(Gls)
2005–2010	FC Zürich II	78	(15)
2005	→ Laredo Heat (loan)	3	(0)
2006	→ Laredo Heat (loan)	3	(0)
2009	→ FC Schaffhausen (loan)	11	(0)
2010–2023	FC Tuggen	267	(56)

International career
2012–2021	Dominican Republic	3	(0)
- * Club domestic league appearances and goals as of 8 December 2025

Starlin Javier Santana (born 16 October 1988 in Palo Verde, Monte Cristi) is a Dominican former footballer and current assistant coach for FC Tuggen.

== Career ==
Santana began his career with FC Spreitenbach before in 2002 was signed by FC Zürich. He left in summer 2007 FC Zürich and played in the first half of the season 2007/2008 eleven games on loan for Laredo Heat. After a half year with the first team of FC Zürich was loaned out in January 2009 for the rest of the season to FC Schaffhausen. He played eleven games for FC Schaffhausen and returned in summer 2009 to FC Zürich, but the contract was resigned in December 2009. After the releasing by FC Zürich signed on 19 January 2010 for FC Tuggen.

After retiring in 2021, in March 2021, Santana joined SC Siebnen of the Swiss seventh division as head coach. On 30 May 2022, he returned to FC Tuggen, as assistant coach to Pino Spagnuolo.
