= David Oteo =

Mexican footballer (born 1973)

Personal information
- Full name: David Alejandro Oteo Rojas
- Date of birth: July 27, 1973 (age 53)
- Place of birth: Mexico City, Mexico
- Height: 1.75 m (5 ft 9 in)
- Position: Defender

Youth career
- UNAM

Senior career*
Years	Team	Apps	(Gls)
1992–1999	UNAM	174	(2)
1999–2004	Tigres UANL	155	(3)
2004	Toluca	7	(0)
2004–2007	Atlante	55	(2)
2008–2009	Veracruz	13	(1)
2010	Guerreros de Hermosillo	18	(0)
2011	Rio Grande Valley Grandes	14	(2)

International career^{‡}
1996–2004	Mexico	12	(1)

Managerial career
- 2013: Atlético Coatzacoalcos (Assistant)
- 2014: Coras (Liga TDP)
- 2015: UACJ (Assistant)
- 2016–2017: Chiapas Reserves and Academy
- 2018: CEFOR Águilas
- * Club domestic league appearances and goals as of 9 August 2011 ‡ National team caps and goals as of 12 May 2011

David Alejandro Oteo Rojas (Note: In this Spanish name, the first or paternal surname is Oteo and the second or maternal family name is Rojas.) (born 27 July 1973) is a Mexican former professional footballer who last played for Rio Grande Valley Grandes in the USL Premier Development League in the United States.

A central defender capable of filling in at left fullback, Oteo began his career with UNAM in the 1992–93 season. He became a starter that season and remained a regular in the Pumas lineup until leaving for Tigres in 1999. By 2001 he had formed a solid partnership with former UNAM teammate Claudio Suárez in a defense that carried Tigres to the Invierno 2001 final, where they lost to Pachuca. In 2003 Tigres again reached the final before losing to Pachuca, with Oteo now receiving much of his playing time at left back after the emergence of Hugo Sánchez Guerrero to join Suárez in the center. He joined Toluca for one season in 2004, playing infrequently, then moved to Atlante in 2005. The Clausura 2007 season was Oteo's last in the Mexican top division.

Oteo also represented Mexico from 1996 to 2004. His international career began in the 1996 U.S. Cup against Bolivia in Dallas on June 8, 1996. He was named to the squad for the 2001 FIFA Confederations Cup by coach Enrique Meza, playing in Mexico's 2–0 loss to Australia. After a spell out of the team under Javier Aguirre, Oteo returned after the appointment of Ricardo Antonio Lavolpe and appeared in Mexico's 8-0 World Cup qualifying victory over Dominica in 2004, scoring his first and only international goal. Oteo's twelfth and last cap came at the 2004 Copa America, in a 2–2 draw against Uruguay on July 7, 2004.

Oteo was a member of Mexico's squad at the 1996 Summer Olympics, but did not appear in any of the team's four matches at the competition.

== Career statistics ==
=== International ===
Appearances and goals by national team and year
National team	Year	Apps	Goals
Mexico	1996	1	0
Mexico	1997	1	0
Mexico	1998	2	0
Mexico	1999	3	0
Mexico	2000	–	
Mexico	2001	2	0
Mexico	2002	–	
Mexico	2003	1	0
Mexico	2004	2	1
Total		12	1

Scores and results list Mexico's goal tally first, score column indicates score after each Oteo goal.

List of international goals scored by David Oteo
No.	Date	Venue	Opponent	Score	Result	Competition
1	27 June 2004	Estadio Victoria, Aguascalientes, Mexico	Dominica	6–0	8–0	2006 FIFA World Cup qualification
