= Anthony Hamilton (soccer) =

American soccer player

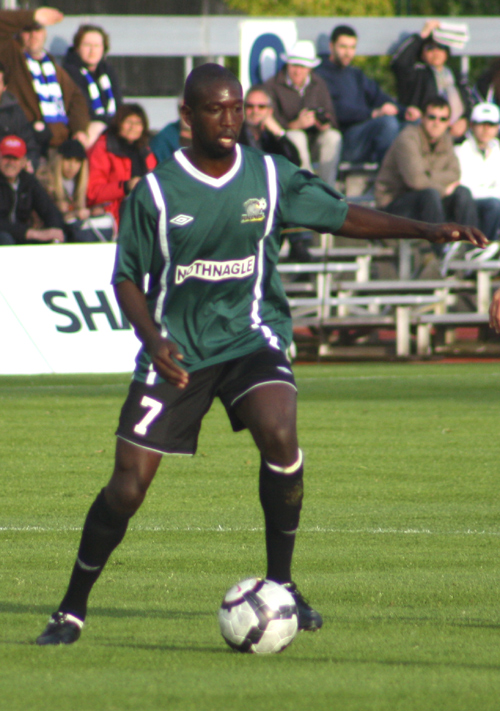

Personal information
- Full name: Anthony Hamilton
- Date of birth: August 26, 1985 (age 41)
- Place of birth: Redlands, California, United States
- Height: 6 ft 0 in (1.83 m)
- Position: Forward

Youth career
- 2003–2006: UC Irvine Anteaters

Senior career*
Years	Team	Apps	(Gls)
2006	Orange County Blue Star	14	(8)
2007–2008	Chivas USA	7	(0)
2009	Ventura County Fusion	15	(8)
2010–2011	Rochester Rhinos	47	(7)
2011	NSC Minnesota Stars	4	(0)
- * Club domestic league appearances and goals as of September 27, 2011

Anthony Hamilton (born August 26, 1985) is an American soccer player.

== Career ==
=== College and amateur ===
Hamilton played college soccer for the University of California, Irvine, featuring in 70 games during his four seasons, amassing 23 goals and seven assists. During his college years he also played for Orange County Blue Star in the USL Premier Development League. Hamilton earned his bachelor's degree in Literary Journalism from the University of California, Irvine in 2010.

=== Professional ===
Hamilton participated in Chivas USA's player combine in December 2006 at the Home Depot Center prior to being selected with the 31st overall pick in the 2007 MLS Supplemental Draft.

He was released by Chivas in February 2009, having played just 7 games for the team, and subsequently signed for Ventura County Fusion of the USL Premier Development League for the 2009 season.

Hamilton signed with Rochester Rhinos on February 16, 2010. After two seasons with Rochester, Hamilton signed with NSC Minnesota Stars of the North American Soccer League on September 6, 2011.

== Honors ==
=== Rochester Rhinos ===
- USSF Division 2 Pro League Regular Season Champions (1): 2010

=== Ventura County Fusion ===
- USL Premier Development League Champions (1): 2009
