= Vince Petrasso =

Canadian former soccer player (born 1987)

Personal information
- Full name: Vincent Anthony Petrasso
- Date of birth: April 11, 1987 (age 39)
- Place of birth: Toronto, Ontario, Canada
- Height: 5 ft 5 in (1.65 m)
- Position: Midfielder

College career
Years	Team	Apps	(Gls)
2006–2009	Campbell Fighting Camels		

Senior career*
Years	Team	Apps	(Gls)
2008	Toronto Lynx	8	(3)
2009	Cary Clarets	13	(1)
2010	Harrisburg City Islanders	17	(5)
2010	York Region Shooters	4	(0)

International career
2005–2009	Canada national soccer team		
- * Club domestic league appearances and goals as of August 15, 2010

Vince Petrasso (born April 11, 1987) is a former Canadian soccer player who played the USL Premier Development League, USL Second Division, and the Canadian Soccer League. Vince Petrasso also was part of Frosinone Calcio at the time Serie C making him youngest player only being 16 years old on the 1st team. He is currently the Director Woodbridge Soccer Club who is youngest Coach in Ontario to win back to back Ontario Cup Finals in 2014-15.

== Career ==
=== College and amateur ===
Petrasso grew up in Woodbridge, Ontario, attended Father Bressani Catholic High School, and played college soccer at Campbell University. He was named to the A-Sun All-Freshman team in his first year at Campbell in 2006, and was an A-Sun Tournament MVP and a league all-tournament team selection as a sophomore in 2007.

During his college years Petrasso also played for the Toronto Lynx and the Cary Clarets in the USL Premier Development League.

=== Professional ===
Petrasso turned professional in 2010 when he signed with the Harrisburg City Islanders of the USL Second Division.Prior to playing in USL Vince Petrasso was playing with Frosinone Calcio in Italy Serie C at 16 years old being youngest player on the squad. He made his professional debut on April 24, 2010, in a game against the Real Maryland Monarchs. At the conclusion of the season he briefly played with the York Region Shooters in the Canadian Soccer League.

=== International ===
Petrasso was a member of the Canada men's national soccer team.
