= Albert Edward (soccer) =

Tanzanian-born-Australian soccer player

Personal information
- Full name: Albert Mwombeki Edward
- Date of birth: 19 November 1991 (age 34)
- Place of birth: Dar es Salaam, Tanzania
- Height: 1.82 m (6 ft 0 in)
- Position: Defender

Youth career
- 2008: Redlands United
- 2009: Brisbane Roar
- 2010–2013: Lindsey Wilson Blue Raiders

Senior career*
Years	Team	Apps	(Gls)
2010	Nashville Metros	6	(0)
2011–2012	River City Rovers	23	(6)
2013	Des Moines Menace	6	(0)
2014	Wilmington Hammerheads	11	(0)

International career
- Australia U17
- * Club domestic league appearances and goals as of 18 September 2014

Albert Mwombeki Edward (born 19 November 1991) is a Tanzanian-born-Australian professional soccer player who played as a defender for Wilmington Hammerheads in the USL Pro.

== Career ==
=== Early career ===
Edward played four years of college soccer at Lindsey Wilson College between 2010 and 2013.

While at college, Edward appeared for USL PDL club's Nashville Metros, River City Rovers and Des Moines Menace.

=== Professional ===
On 21 January 2014 Edward was drafted in the fourth round (68th overall) of the 2014 MLS SuperDraft by Colorado Rapids. However, he was not signed by the club.

Edward signed with USL Pro club Wilmington Hammerheads on 30 May 2014.
