= Debola Ogunseye =

Nigerian footballer

Personal information
- Full name: Debola Ogunseye
- Date of birth: April 27, 1988 (age 38)
- Place of birth: Lagos, Nigeria
- Height: 5 ft 6 in (1.68 m)
- Position: Forward

Youth career
- 2003–2005: Olabisi Onabanjo University
- 2006–2008: Newberry Indians
- 2009: Furman Paladins

Senior career*
Years	Team	Apps	(Gls)
2009	Mississippi Brilla	15	(14)
2010	Charlotte Eagles	11	(5)
2010–2011	Kartalspor		
2011	TKİ Tavşanlı Linyitspor		
2011–2014	Küçük Kaymaklı		
2014	→Gençlik Gücü SK (loan)		
2015	Yeni Amasyaspor		
2015–2016	Tatvan Gençlerbirliği		
2016	Başkale Gençlik		
2016–2019	Gençlik Gücü SK		
- * Club domestic league appearances and goals

Debola Ogunseye (born April 27, 1988 in Lagos) is a Nigerian former footballer.

== Career ==
=== College and amateur ===
In his home country of Nigeria, Ogunseye attended Olabisi Onabanjo University, and was part of the team which won the 2005 West African University Games and a silver medal in the Nigerian University Football League. He moved to the United States in 2006 after being offered a scholarship to attend and play college soccer at Newberry College in Newberry, South Carolina.

At Newberry he was named to the All-SAC first team, the Daktronics All-Appalachian Region second team and the NSCAA Appalachian Region first team as a freshman, to the all-SAC First Team and the All-Appalachian Region first teams by Daktronics and the NSCCA as a sophomore, and earned NSCAA All-Southeast Region honors as a junior in 2008, before transferring to Furman University prior to his senior year. He is ranked second in Newberry history with 48 goals, 19 assists and 115 total points.

During his college years Ogunseye also played in the USL Premier Development League (PDL) with Mississippi Brilla, earning All-Conference and All-League honors and being named a finalist for the PDL most valuable player award.

=== Professional ===
After graduating from college, undrafted,, Ogunseye signed with the Charlotte Eagles of the USL Second Division after taking part in the 2010 USL Men's Player Showcase. He made his professional debut on April 17, 2010, in a game against Charleston Battery, and scored his first professional goal on May 14, 2010 in a 2-1 win over the Pittsburgh Riverhounds. He remained with Charlotte for three months before signing with Turkish side Kartalspor on July 28, 2010.

Ogunseye later moved to fellow TFF First League side TKİ Tavşanlı Linyitspor.
