= Wilfrid Loizeau =

Guadeloupean footballer (born 1985)

Personal information
- Full name: Wilfrid Loizeau
- Date of birth: 20 March 1985 (age 41)
- Place of birth: Paris, France
- Height: 1.70 m (5 ft 7 in)
- Position: Attacking midfielder

Youth career
- 2000–2004: Créteil

Senior career*
Years	Team	Apps	(Gls)
2002–2003	→ Le Havre B (loan)	0	(0)
2003–2004	→ Al-Shamal (loan)	0	(0)
2004–2005	Paris FC	0	(0)
2005–2006	Stade Auxerre	24	(4)
2005	AS Poissy	1	(0)
2006	Petrolul Ploieşti	13	(2)
2007–2008	SIAD Most	0	(0)
2007–2008	→ Chmel Blšany (loan)	11	(3)
2008–2009	Virton	4	(0)
2009	Atlanta Blackhawks	6	(2)
2009–2012	FC Bavois	5	(0)
2012	FC Baulmes	9	(0)
2012–2013	Yverdon-Sport	12	(0)
2013	FC La Sarraz-Eclépens	5	(0)
2013–2016	FC Lutry	13	(0)
2016–2017	FC Aigle	2	(0)
Total		105	(11)

International career
2007–2008	Guadeloupe	8	(1)
- * Club domestic league appearances and goals

Wilfrid Loizeau (born 20 March 1985) is a former footballer who plays as a midfielder. Born in France, he represented Guadeloupe at international level.

== Career ==
=== Early career ===
After passing through the renowned youth academies of Le Havre and Auxerre, Loizeau spent the early years of his professional career with Créteil (then in Ligue 2) and Paris FC (then in Championnat National) before moving abroad in 2006, to Romanian Liga II side Petrolul Ploieşti.

=== SIAD Most (Czech Republic) ===
After a brief spell in Romania, in the summer of 2007 Loizeau signed with SIAD Most, then competing in the Gambrinus liga, the top league in the Czech Republic. Most loaned Loizeau for the season to their subsidiary club Chmel Blšany in the Bohemian Football League (ČFL). In 2007–08 Loizeau made 11 appearances (all starts) for Blšany. At the end of the season (and the loan period), Most was relegated to the Czech 2. Liga, so rather than return to Most, Loizeau decided to leave Czech Republic.

=== Vitória de Setúbal (Portugal) ===
Loizeau spent most of preseason 2008–09 with Vitória de Setúbal of the Portuguese Liga, the top league in Portugal. During the spell Loizeau played in friendly matches against several top clubs, including English Premier League side Sunderland. Loizeau performed well and very nearly signed with the Portuguese club, but supposedly his contract could not be "approved for administrative reasons" and was nothing at all due to the fact he could not even kick a ball in a straight line.

=== Royal Excelsior Virton (Belgium) ===
After his time in Portugal, Loizeau arrived in Belgium for trials. After playing in a friendly match for Belgian Second Division club Royal Antwerp F.C. against Excelsior Virton, the opposing side Virton, also of the Belgian Second Division, quickly offered Loizeau a contract. Loizeau officially signed a one-year contract with Virton on 16 October 2008; the contract included a clause that would allow Loizeau to leave the club during the winter transfer window.

In December 2008 Loizeau was called into the Guadeloupe National Team's squad for the final round of the 2008 Caribbean Championship in Jamaica. R.E. Virton officials were not happy with Loizeau's decision to accept his national team's invitation; as a result, when Loizeau returned to Belgium following the Caribbean Championship, he and the club decided to part ways.

=== United States ===
In 2009, Loizeau moved to the United States to play with Atlanta Blackhawks in the USL Premier Development League. Following his time in Atlanta, Wilfrid was offered a contract at MLS outfit San Jose Earthquakes but decided that it was not the right move for him at the time. On 11 February 2010, AC St. Louis of the USSF Division 2 Professional League announced it had signed Loizeau to play with the team in 2010 after he had failed to turn up to other trials he had organised in Europe.; however, Wilfrid's eventual move to St. Louis did not go through for unknown reasons, as he did not end up on AC St. Louis' final roster for the season.

=== Switzerland ===
After the departure of Atlanta Silverbacks signed in summer 2009 for Swiss 1.Liga Gruppe 1 club FC Bavois.

=== International career ===
Loizeau made his Guadeloupe National Team debut at the Final Round of the 2006–07 Caribbean Nations Cup that was played in January 2007 in Trinidad and Tobago. His debut match was on 14 January 2007, a 2–1 win over Cuba.

Loizeau scored his first goal for Guadeloupe in the following group match, a 4–3 loss to Guyana on 16 January 2007. In total, Loizeau made four appearances at the Finals, scoring one goal, as Guadeloupe finished fourth overall.

Loizeau was called into Guadeloupe's squad for the Final Round of the 2008 Caribbean Championship played in December 2008 in Jamaica. Loizeau made four appearances (three starts) at the Finals, as Guadeloupe finished third overall.
