= Rudy Ybarra =

American professional soccer player

Personal information
- Date of birth: April 3, 1958 (age 68)
- Place of birth: Santa Barbara, California, United States
- Position: Forward

Senior career*
| Years | Team | Apps | (Gls) |
| 1978 | Los Angeles Aztecs | 27 | (4) |
| 1979 | Tulsa Roughnecks | | |
| 1979 | Memphis Rogues | 8 | (0) |
| 1980–1981 | Los Angeles Aztecs (indoor) | 14 | (6) |
| 1986–1987 | Hollywood Kickers | ? | (3) |
| 1989 | Real Santa Barbara | | |

Managerial career
- 2006–2008: Ventura County Fusion (assistant)
- 2012–2019: Ventura County Fusion (head coach)
- * Club domestic league appearances and goals

Rudy Ybarra (born 3 April 1958) is an American former professional soccer player who played professionally in the North American Soccer League and Western Soccer Alliance.

== Player ==
Ybarra graduated from Santa Barbara High School in the class of 1976. In 1978, he signed with the Los Angeles Aztecs of the North American Soccer League. On March 17, 1979, the Aztecs traded Ybarra to the Tulsa Roughnecks in exchange for Vito Dimitrijević and future considerations. The Roughnecks later traded him to the Memphis Rogues. He played the 1980–1981 NASL indoor season with the Aztecs. In 1986 and 1987, he played for the Hollywood Kickers of the Western Soccer Alliance. In 1989, he played for Real Santa Barbara.

== Coaching Experience ==
Ybarra has held several coaching positions at many levels and has been successful at each of those levels. Ybarra has spent time coaching at Santa Barbara High School, Santa Barbara Soccer Club (youth), Santa Barbara Soccer Club (men's team in the Central Coast Soccer League in Santa Barbara), Ventura County Fusion of the Player Development League and Westmont College of Santa Barbara, California.

Ybarra served as the head coach of the men's varsity soccer team for nine seasons at Santa Barbara High School, and guided the team to many Channel League championships as well as the 1995 CIF Division II Championship. Ybarra was also named CIF Coach of the Year in the 1994 and 1995 seasons. Ybarra is also one of the few people that have had the honor of being recognized as CIF Coach of the Year and CIF Player of the Year (1975 and 1976).

After retiring as a professional soccer player, Ybarra continued to play semi-professional soccer on the weekends for his beloved Santa Barbara Soccer Club in the Central Coast Soccer League where he served as a player/coach and captained the team to the 1991 and 1992 California State Championships, helping solidify the club as one of the premier semi-professional soccer teams in the state. After retiring from competitive soccer, Ybarra also guided the team to their third California State Championship in 2002 as the head coach.

Wanting to give back to the local community, Ybarra began coaching local youth soccer at Santa Barbara Soccer Club. Ybarra guided the Boys 1996 and Boys 1998 teams to numerous Cal South State Championships, US Youth Soccer Region IV Championships and US Youth Soccer National League Championships. The Boys 1996 group won the state, regional and national championship in 2014. The Boys 1998 group won the Cal South State Championship on six occasions (2010 and 2012–2016), six US Youth Soccer Region IV Championships (2010–2016) and three US Youth Soccer National League Championships (2012, 2013 and 2016). Due to his accomplishments in youth soccer with Santa Barbara Soccer Club, Ybarra has been recognized by Cal South, the governing body of youth club soccer in Southern California, as the Nike Competitive Coach of the Year in 2013, 2015 and 2017.

From 2006 until May 2008, Ybarra has served as an assistant with the expansion Ventura County Fusion of the Premier Development League. Ybarra then returned to the Ventura County Fusion as its head coach in April 2012 and still currently holds the position.

In August 2016, Ybarra joined the Westmont College Men's soccer team as an assistant coach and still currently forms part of the coaching staff. In these two seasons, the Westmont Warriors have won the Golden State Athletic Conference Championship (GSAC).

== Promoter ==
In addition to his coaching duties, Ybarra co-founded Santa Barbara Soccer Entertainment to market soccer events in Southern California. In June 2006, his company formed an alliance with 11 Sports Marketing LLC to expand their marketing opportunities.
