= David Lilly =

Scottish footballer (born 1986)

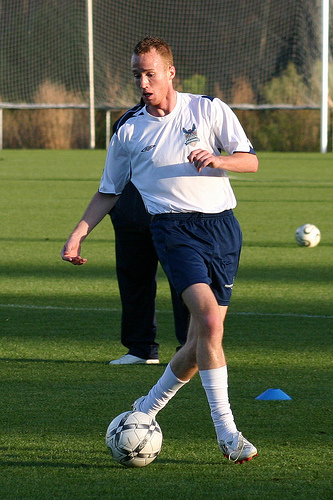

Personal information
- Date of birth: 14 January 1986 (age 40)
- Place of birth: Coatbridge, Scotland
- Height: 6 ft 0 in (1.83 m)
- Position: Midfielder

College career
Years	Team	Apps	(Gls)
2003–2006	Milligan Buffaloes		

Senior career*
Years	Team	Apps	(Gls)
2006	West Virginia Chaos	15	(4)
2007	Mississippi Brilla	15	(4)
2008	Carolina RailHawks	8	(0)
2009–2010	Mississippi Brilla	23	(0)

Managerial career
- 2007: Milligan Buffaloes (asst.)
- 2010–2017: East Tennessee State Buccaneers (asst.)
- 2018–2021: Milligan Buffaloes
- 2022–2023: East Tennessee State
- 2024–: UAB Blazers
- * Club domestic league appearances and goals as of 19 April 2021

David Lilly (born 14 January 1986 in Coatbridge) is a Scottish footballer who is currently the head coach at the University of Alabama at Birmingham.

== Career ==
=== College and amateur ===
Lilly attended Milligan College which played in the NAIA Appalachian Athletic Conference (AAC). He was the AAC Player of the Year in 2005. In 2006, he was both the Conference and Regional Player of the Year. He was also a 2005 and 2006 NAIA honorable mention All American.

Lilly began his professional career in 2006 with West Virginia Chaos of the USL Premier Development League, before going on to play for Mississippi Brilla in 2007. On 16 April 2008, the Carolina RailHawks of the USL First Division announced they had signed Lilly for the 2008 season. On 9 April 2009, he returned to the Brilla.

=== Coaching ===
In 2007, in addition to playing with Mississippi Brilla, Lilly also served as an assistant coach with both the men's and women's soccer teams at Milligan College.

David Lilly was a graduate assistant coach for East Tennessee State University men's soccer team.

In January 2018, Lilly rejoined his alma mater Milligan University as head coach of the men's soccer team.

In December 2021, Lilly rejoined ETSU Mens Soccer team as Head Coach. In December 2023, Lilly resigned to become the head coach of UAB.
