= Gregory Mulamba =

South African soccer player

Personal information
- Date of birth: 31 August 1986 (age 40)
- Place of birth: Johannesburg, South Africa
- Height: 1.82 m (6 ft 0 in)
- Position: Midfielder

Senior career*
Years	Team	Apps	(Gls)
2007–2014	Laredo Heat	94	(7)
2015	Austin Aztex	1	(0)
2015	→ Oklahoma City Energy (loan)	4	(0)
- * Club domestic league appearances and goals as of 3 October 2015

Gregory Mulamba (born 31 August 1986) is a South African soccer player who played for Austin Aztex in the USL.

== Career ==
=== Amateur ===
Mulamba enjoyed a seven-year spell with USL PDL side Laredo Heat from 2007 to 2014.

=== Professional ===
Mulamba signed his first professional contract with United Soccer League side Austin Aztex in January 2015, before been loaned out to league rivals Oklahoma City Energy in March 2015.
