= Ventura County Fusion =

- Full name: Ventura County Fusion Soccer Club
- Nickname: The Fusion
- Founded: 2006; 20 years ago
- Stadium: Ventura College Sportsplex; Ventura, California
- Capacity: 5,000
- Owner: Ranbir Shergill
- Head Coach: Keith Costigan
- League: USL League Two
- 2023: 2nd, Southwest Division; Playoffs: Conference Final
- Website: vcfusion.com
Home colors	Away colors

Ventura County Fusion is an American soccer team based in Ventura, California, United States. Founded in 2006, the team plays in USL League Two, the fourth tier of the American soccer pyramid.

The team plays its home games in the stadium on the campus of Ventura College, the VC SportsPlex, where they have played since 2011. The team's colors are blue, orange and white. All home games are streamed live on the Fusion's YouTube channel. All broadcasts are done in conjunction with CAPS TV in Ventura.

== History ==
The Fusion entered the Premier Development League in 2007 as the first ever soccer franchise from the Ventura County area of Southern California. They played their first competitive game on April 28, 2007, beating fellow expansion franchise Lancaster Rattlers 2–1, and setting the wheels in motion for what turned out to be a promising first season. Four wins in their next five games – including impressive victories over traditional regional powerhouses Fresno Fuego and Orange County Blue Star – propelled the Fusion to the top of the table by mid-season. However, a spate of injuries began to take its toll on their roster, and by the middle of July the Fusion were stuttering towards the finish line, still in with a shout of making the playoffs, but being hampered by damaging defeats to Fresno and the Southern California Seahorses. By the time the final set of games came round, Fusion needed three points from their final two games to leapfrog the San Fernando Valley Quakes into the playoffs, but two consecutive ties – 3–3 with Southern California Seahorses and a hugely disappointing 0–0 with Los Angeles Storm – meant that they finished their debut season fourth in the table. English striker Mark Draycott was the team's leading marksman, notching an impressive ten goals, while Eric Avila and Chance Myers led the assist stats.

In the offseason, Fusion played against English Premier League side Everton in a closed friendly at the Home Depot Center on July 24, 2007. The match was organised by head coach Smith, who "wanted it to be a reward for their great play during their inaugural season". Later, in early 2008, Fusion hosted games against Hammarby of the Swedish Allsvenskan, and Real Salt Lake and Columbus Crew of MLS. Fusion enjoyed a 1–0 victory over a Columbus side that included MLS veterans such as Frankie Hejduk, despite playing without all their college players, due to NCAA regulations.

Ventura started their second competitive season without the services of Chance Myers and Eric Avila, both of whom had been taken in the 2008 MLS SuperDraft, and Mark Draycott, who had returned to England to play for Swindon Supermarine. Despite this, anticipation was high that success would be swift, but they actually started the season sluggishly, losing two of their first four games, and not picking up a victory until their 3–0 triumph over Fresno Fuego in late May. This signalled an about-turn in form; Fusion enjoyed four wins in June, including an impressive 4–1 thrashing of Fresno Fuego away from home. Two more impressive victories – 2–0 over Southern California Seahorses and 4–0 over Lancaster Rattlers – kept Fusion's playoff run on course, but a shock 1–0 defeat to struggling Orange County Blue Star at home meant that they had to beat eventual divisional champions San Fernando Valley Quakes in their next game, or their season would be over. The Quakes won 3–2 in a bad-tempered game at Pierce College, and Ventura were left rueing another year of missed opportunities. They eventually finished the season in 3rd, just two points out of the playoffs; Hagop Chirishian was the team's top scorer, with 4 goals, while former Chivas USA midfielder Rodrigo López led with 3 assists.

On July 21, 2009 the Fusion played Burnley of the Barclays Premier League, however the superior class showed through and despite a spirited showing the Fusion went down 5–0.

2009 was a breakout year for Fusion. Having added former MLS players Ivan Becerra, Anthony Hamilton and Adam Smarte to the roster during the offseason, Ventura looked like a decent bet to qualify for the post-season for the first time. Things did not start well; they drew 2–2 with Bakersfield Brigade in their opening game of the season, and then were thumped 4–0 at home by the Hollywood United Hitmen next time out. The hammering, however, seemed to bring things into focus, and things improved sharply. From then on, Ventura embarked on an astonishing 12-game unbeaten streak that included six ties and hard-fought victories away at the Ogden Outlaws, a 3–2 revenge win away at Hollywood, and a 4–2 goal fest at home to the BYU Cougars in which Anthony Hamilton scored a brace. A nervy 1–0 loss to the Los Angeles Legends on the last day of the regular season meant that the Fusion finished third in the Southwest division, but sneaked into the playoffs by the back door as the lowest seed in the West. Fusion beat the Legends 2–1 in the first round of the playoffs thanks to early goals by Alfonso Motagalvan and Anthony Hamilton, and then defeated divisional champions Hollywood in extra time thanks to two late goals by Sam Myerson. For the national quarter finals Ventura travelled to Laredo, Texas, and dispatched Northwest division champions Kitsap Pumas 2–1 on an injury-time free kick from Rodrigo López, and then demolished the Bradenton Academics 6–1 in searing heat to qualify for their first ever PDL Championship game. Ventura hosted the final, which was broadcast live on Fox Soccer Channel, and snatched a victory from out of the hands of Chicago Fire Premier with an injury time winner from Alfonso Motagalvan, despite playing for most of the match with ten men. Artur Aghasyan and Anthony Hamilton were Ventura's regular-season top scorers, with 8 goals each, while Hamilton and Hagop Chirishian contributed 3 assists apiece.

On July 15, 2014, Fusion played a friendly match against Rangers from Glasgow, Scotland, which the Fusion won 3–1.

On July 15, 2018, Jermaine Jones played his last game of competitive football with the Fusion in a 1–0 home loss to FC Golden State Force.

== Players ==
=== Current squad ===
Note: Flags indicate national team as defined under FIFA eligibility rules; some limited exceptions apply. Players may hold more than one non-FIFA nationality.

No.	Pos.	Nation	Player
1	GK	USA	Luke Pruter
2	DF	NOR	Mathias Winum
3	DF	USA	Michael Arrington
4	DF	USA	Sebastian Hernandez
5	MF	SLV	Erick Serrano
6	MF	USA	Beto Apolinar
7	MF	USA	Zack Harris
8	MF	USA	Jorge Lopez
10	FW	SLE	Buba Fofanah
11	FW	CAN	Marley Edwards
12	DF	ALG	Siddiq Lezzar
13	GK	USA	Kash Oladapo
14	FW	USA	Samy Kanaan
15	MF	DEN	Mikkel Goeling
16	DF	PUR	Gio Calderón
17	FW	GHA	Michael Acquah
18	DF	USA	Kevin Carmichael

No.	Pos.	Nation	Player
19	FW	USA	Ashton Alonge
20	DF	USA	Caden Vom Steeg
21	FW	USA	Ocean Salari
—	GK	USA	David Mitzner
—	DF	USA	Palmer Bank
—	DF	USA	Ori Bitton
—	DF	GER	Nick Lockermann
—	DF	GER	Adrian Schulze Solano
—	DF	AUS	Jake Shaked
—	DF	JPN	Haruki Utsumi
—	MF	GER	Samuel Atiye
—	MF	USA	Fletcher Bank
—	MF	GIB	Niels Hartman
—	FW	USA	Cesar Bahena
—	FW	USA	David Garcia
—	FW	USA	Jackson Kestler
—	FW	GHA	Bright Nutornutsi

=== Notable former players ===
This list of notable former players comprises players who went on to play professional soccer after playing for the team in the Premier Development League, or those who previously played professionally before joining the team.

- (Armenia) Vardan Adzemian
- (Armenia) Artur Aghasyan
- (Haiti) Jean Alexandre
- (United States) Jaime Ambriz
- (United States) Rony Argueta
- (Armenia) Jack Avesyan
- (United States) Mathayo Huma
- (United States) Eric Avila
- (United States) Diego Barrera
- (Mexico) Ivan Becerra
- (Republic of Ireland) Bryan Byrne
- (France) Achille Campion
- (Mexico) Javier Castro
- (United States) Hagop Chirishian
- (United States) Jerry Desdunes
- (England) Mark Draycott
- (United States) Michael Enfield
- (United States) Gabriel Farfan
- (United States) Michael Farfan
- (Ethiopia) Michael Ghebru
- (United States) Manny Guzman
- (United States) Anthony Hamilton
- (United States) J. J. Koval
- (United States) Rodrigo López
- (United States) Alfonso Motagalvan
- (United States) Chance Myers
- (United States) Anton Peterlin
- (United States) Nelson Pizarro
- (United States) Dylan Riley
- (United States) Brad Rusin
- (England) Jamie Scope
- (Guatemala) Willie Sims
- (Brazil) Thomaz
- (United States) Marcus Watson
- (United States) Brent Whitfield
- (United States) Gyasi Zardes
- (Philippines) Henry Brauner
- (United States) Brian Rowe
- (Ghana) Abu Danladi
- (England) Joe Holland
- (United States) Nick DePuy
- (United States) Justin Vom Steeg
- (United States) Daniel Steres
- (United States) James Kiffe
- (United States) Jochen Graf
- (United States) Michael Daly
- (United States) Brandon Vincent
- (United States) Earl Edwards Jr.
- (United States) Matt LaGrassa
- (United States) Rony Argueta
- (Mexico) Tony Alfaro
- (United States) Javan Torre
- (The Gambia) Ismaila Jome
- (United States) Sam Strong

== Year-by-year ==
Year	Division	League	Regular season	Playoffs	Open Cup	Avg. attendance
2007	4	USL PDL	4th, Southwest	did not qualify	did not qualify	1,176
2008	4	USL PDL	3rd, Southwest	did not qualify	did not qualify	1,217
2009	4	USL PDL	3rd, Southwest	Champions	did not qualify	876
2010	4	USL PDL	1st, Southwest	Conference Semi-Finals	1st Round	873
2011	4	USL PDL	2nd, Southwest	Conference Semi-Finals	2nd Round	1,116
2012	4	USL PDL	1st, Southwest	Conference Finals	3rd Round	1,302
2013	4	USL PDL	2nd, Southwest	Conference Semifinals	2nd Round	1,282
2014	4	USL PDL	1st, Southwest	Conference Semifinals	did not qualify	1,322
2015	4	USL PDL	2nd, Southwest	Division Playoffs	2nd Round	—
2016	4	USL PDL	4th, Southwest	did not qualify	1st Round	—
2017	4	USL PDL	8th, Southwest	did not qualify	did not qualify	—
2018	4	USL PDL	2nd, Southwest	did not qualify	did not qualify	—
2019	4	USL League Two	2nd, Southwest	Conference Finals	did not qualify	—
2020	4	USL League Two	Season cancelled due to COVID-19 pandemic			
2021	4	USL League Two	did not play due to COVID-19 pandemic			
2022	4	USL League Two	2nd, Southwest	Champions	did not qualify	—
2023	4	USL League Two	2nd, Southwest	Conference Final	1st round	—
2024	4	USL League Two	1st, Southwest	Conference Semi-finals	did not qualify	—
2025	4	USL League Two	1st, Southwest	Conference Final	1st round	—
2026	4	USL League Two	1st, Southwest	National Semifinals	1st Round	—

== Honors ==
- USL PDL Southwest Division
  - Champions: 2010, 2012, 2014
- USL PDL Western Conference
  - Champions: 2009
- USL PDL
  - Champions: 2009
- USL League Two Southwest Division
  - Champions: 2024
- USL League Two Western Conference
  - Champions: 2022
- USL League Two
  - Champions: 2022

== Notable matches ==
July 15, 2014 Friendly	Ventura County Fusion (United States)	3–1	(Scotland) Rangers F.C.	Ventura, California
7:15 p.m. PST	Vale 42'; Argueta 73'; LaGrassa 84'	Report	Mohsni 80'	Stadium: Ventura College Sportsplex

== Head coaches ==
- (England) Graham Smith (2007–2009)
- (United States) Ole Mikkelsen (2010–2012)
- (United States) Rudy Ybarra (2013–2019)
- (England) Mike Elias (2019–2023)
- (United States) Keith Costigan (2024–present)

== Stadia ==
- Bulldog Stadium at Buena High School; Ventura, California (2007–2010)
- Panther Stadium at Newbury Park High School; Thousand Oaks, California, 2 games (2007–2008)
- Stadium at Ventura College; Ventura, California (2009, 2011–present)
