= Texas A&M International University Soccer Complex =

Soccer complex in Laredo, Texas

Coordinates: 27.5698°N 99.4318°W

- Dustdevil Field; TAMIU Soccer Complex
- Interactive map of Texas A&M International University Soccer Complex
- Full name: Texas A&M International University Soccer Complex
- Location: Laredo, Texas
- Owner: Texas A&M International University
- Capacity: Soccer: 4,000

Construction
- Built: 2006
- Opened: 2006
- Renovated: 2007

Tenants
- Laredo Heat; TAMIU Dustdevils

Texas A&M International University Soccer Complex (also known as Dustdevil Field and TAMIU Soccer Complex) was built in 2006 and renovated in 2007. The soccer complex is located in Laredo, Texas on the Texas A&M International University campus. The complex has two soccer fields with a seating capacity of 4,000 on one of them. The Dustdevil Field was the home stadium to the 2007 champion team Laredo Heat, a member of the National Premier Soccer League and the TAMIU Dustdevils women and men's soccer teams, a member of the Heartland Conference, NCAA Division II.

== Exhibition games ==
Exhibition soccer games hosted by the Texas A&M International University Soccer Complex:

- United States U-20 vs Mexico U-20
  - 3:0 U.S. win
    - attendance: 4,000
      - July 11, 2008
- Mexico U-20 vs Laredo Heat
  - 3:0 Mexico win
    - attendance: 4,000
      - July 9, 2008
