= Akron Summit Assault =

- Full name: Akron Metro Futbol Club Summit Assault
- Nicknames: Summit Assault, Metro
- Founded: 2010
- Dissolved: 2011
- Ground: St. Vincent-St. Mary High School; Akron, Ohio
- Capacity: 3,000
- Club President: (United States) Dave Laughlin
- Head Coach: (England) Denzil Antonio
- League: USL Premier Development League
- 2011: 5th, Great Lakes; Playoffs: DNQ
- Website: http://www.akronsummitassault.com/
| Home colors | Away colors |

Akron Summit Assault was an American soccer team based in Akron, Ohio, United States. Founded in 2010, they played their only season in the USL Premier Development League (PDL), the fourth tier of the American Soccer Pyramid, in the Great Lakes Division of the Central Conference.

The team played the majority of its home games in the stadium at St. Vincent-St. Mary High School, with selected games being held at Lee Jackson Field on the campus of the University of Akron. The team's colors were orange, lime green, and white.

== History ==
Akron Summit Assault was announced as a USL Premier Development League expansion franchise on February 23, 2011, as an unofficial replacement for the Cleveland Internationals franchise which folded at the end of 2010. They played their first competitive game on May 14, 2011, in a 2-0 loss to Chicago Fire Premier. The first goal in franchise history was scored by Michael O'Neill in their next game, a 2-2 tie with the Cincinnati Kings. On Sunday, July 24, 2011, the Akron played their final game, a 1-4 loss against the Chicago Fire U-23 finishing the season with a 5-8-3 record. The Akron Summit Assault folded after the 2011 season for undisclosed reasons. Although it is generally understood that the reason was financial distress.

== Players ==
=== Final roster ===
As of June 7, 2011.

Note: Flags indicate national team as defined under FIFA eligibility rules; some limited exceptions apply. Players may hold more than one non-FIFA nationality.

| No. | Pos. | Nation | Player |
|---|---|---|---|
| 1 | GK | USA | Brad Stuver |
| 2 | MF | USA | Kyle Scharfenberg |
| 3 | DF | USA | Mike Matlock |
| 4 | DF | USA | Sean Sikich |
| 5 | MF | USA | Christian Dominguez |
| 6 | MF | USA | Aodhan Quinn |
| 7 | MF | NGR | Michael Balogun |
| 8 | MF | ENG | Michael O'Neill |
| 9 | FW | USA | Mariusz Trzeciak |
| 10 | FW | ENG | Ashton Campbell |
| 11 | MF | USA | Thomas Schmitt |
| 12 | FW | USA | Vaughn Spurrier |

| No. | Pos. | Nation | Player |
|---|---|---|---|
| 13 | DF | USA | Matt Dagilis |
| 14 | DF | AUS | Ryan Johnstone |
| 15 | MF | USA | Ryan Minick |
| 16 | FW | USA | Aaron Adkins |
| 17 | MF | ENG | Rhys Cannella |
| 18 | FW | USA | Ben Truax |
| 19 | FW | BIH | Admir Suljevic |
| 20 | MF | ROU | Vlad Muresan |
| 21 | DF | USA | Kayvon Aserifard |
| 31 | GK | USA | Carl Contrasciere |
| 32 | GK | USA | Richard Ott |

== Year-by-year ==
| Year | Division | League | Regular season | Playoffs | Open Cup |
|---|---|---|---|---|---|
| 2011 | 4 | PDL | 5th, Great Lakes | Did not qualify | Did not qualify |

== Head coaches ==
- (England) Denzil Antonio (2011)

== Stadium ==
- Stadium at St. Vincent-St. Mary High School; Akron, Ohio (2011)
- Lee Jackson Field at the University of Akron; Akron, Ohio (2011) 2 games

== Average attendance ==
Attendance stats are calculated by averaging each team's self-reported home attendances from the historical match archive at https://web.archive.org/web/20100105175057/http://www.uslsoccer.com/history/index_E.html.

- 2011: 185
