= Laredo Heat SC =

Laredo Heat
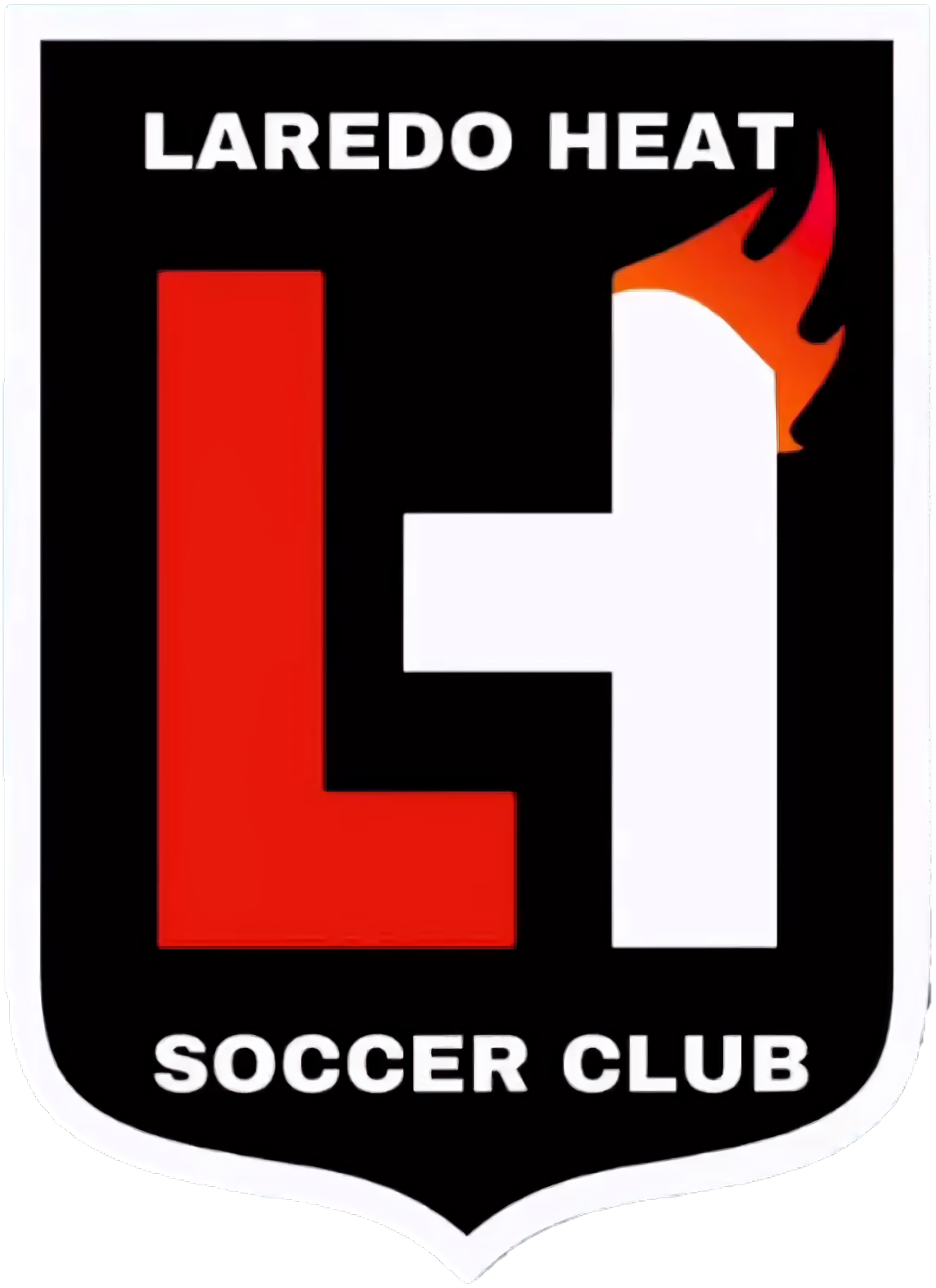
- Full name: Laredo Heat Soccer Club
- Nicknames: The Heat, The Red Flames
- Founded: 2004; 22 years ago
- Stadium: PEG Energy Stadium; Laredo, Texas
- Capacity: 4,000
- Owners: Shashi Vaswani
- General Manager: Juan Jose Vela
- Head Coach: John Powell
- League: USL League Two
- 2023: 5th, Lone Star
- Website: laredoheatsc.com
Home colors	Away colors

Laredo Heat Soccer Club is an American soccer team based in Laredo, Texas. The team competes in USL League Two, the fourth tier of the American Soccer Pyramid, as a member of the Lone Star Division.

The team plays its home games at the PEG Energy Stadium, where they have played since 2024. The team's colors are red, black and white.

Founded in 2004, the team was a member of the USL Premier Development League from 2004 to 2015. The club took a hiatus for the 2016 and 2017 seasons.

== History ==
=== 2004 ===
Laredo Heat initially joined the USL Premier Development League in 2004 as an expansion franchise, playing a limited 'exploratory' schedule of eight exhibition games against selected opponents, but only managed two wins, both over the Lafayette Swamp Cats, 4–0 and 5–0, the latter of which featured a hat trick from striker Nelson Mata-Meza. Former Tampa Bay Mutiny, D.C. United and US national team striker Roy Lassiter played for Laredo in their 2–1 loss to DFW Tornados, but did not get on the score sheet. He also played in a 1–1 draw against UNAM.

=== 2016 ===
The Heat decided to opt out of the PDL's 2016 season, citing the slow growth of the Mid-South Division as the reason.

=== 2017 ===
The Heat announced they will be part of an expansion team of the National Premier Soccer League in 2018.

=== 2025 ===
The Heat announced would return to USL League Two for the 2025 season, marking the club's return to the league after a 10-year hiatus. The Heat, who had previously competed in League Two from 2004 to 2015 and won the league title in 2007, will play their home matches at the new PEG Energy Stadium in Laredo, Texas, as part of the Lone Star Division.

== Team ==
=== Technical staff ===
Updated June 2024

Position	
Head coach	John Powell
Assistant coach	Braeden Anderson
Assistant coach	Johnny Ibarra

==== Notable former players ====
- (Mexico) Armando Begines, played for Chivas USA and Querétaro F.C.
- (United States) Roy Lassiter, played for L.D. Alajuelense, D.C. United, Miami Fusion and Kansas City Wizards
- Lexton Moy, played for the Philippines national football team
- Yaikel Perez, plays for the Cuba national football team
- Javier Santana, plays for FC Tuggen and Dominican Republic national football team

== Year-by-year ==
Year	League	Regular season	Playoffs	Open Cup
2004	USL PDL	8th, Mid South	did not qualify	did not qualify
2005	USL PDL	2nd, Mid South	Conference Finals	did not qualify
2006	USL PDL	1st, Mid South	National Final	1st Round
2007	USL PDL	1st, Mid South	Champions	did not qualify
2008	USL PDL	2nd, Mid South	National Final	did not qualify
2009	USL PDL	1st, Mid South	Conference Finals	did not qualify
2010	USL PDL	1st, Mid South	Conference Semifinal	did not qualify
2011	USL PDL	1st, Mid South	National Final	did not qualify
2012	USL PDL	1st, Mid South	Conference Semifinal	2nd Round
2013	USL PDL	2nd, Mid South	Conference Finals	2nd Round
2014	USL PDL	2nd, Mid South	Conference Semifinal	4th Round
2015	USL PDL	3rd, Mid South	did not qualify	2nd Round
2016	On Hiatus			
2017	On Hiatus			
2018	NPSL	1st, Lone Star	Regional semifinals	did not qualify
2019	NPSL	5th, Lone Star	did not qualify	2nd Round
2020	NPSL	Cancelled due to COVID		
2021	NPSL	2nd, Lone Star	Conference Final	did not qualify
2022	NPSL	1st, Lone Star	Regional semifinals	did not qualify
2023	NPSL	5th, Lone Star	did not qualify	did not qualify
2024	NPSL	4th, Lone Star	Conference Semifinals	did not qualify
2025	USL2	1st, Lone Star	Runner-up	did not qualify
2026	USL2	1st, Lone Star	National Semifinals	First Round

=== Events hosted by the Laredo Heat ===
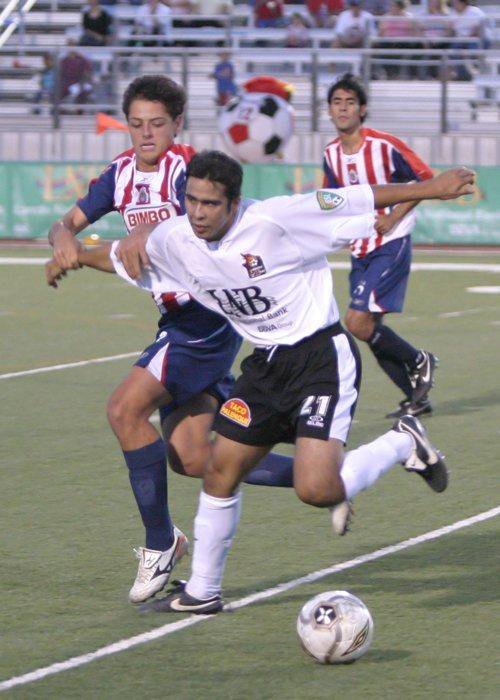
Javier "Chicharito" Hernández playing against the Laredo Heat Soccer Club on May 24, 2006

- April 20, 2006: Laredo Heat vs Tigres UANL
- May 24, 2006: Laredo Heat vs Chivas de Guadalajara
- July 9, 2008: Laredo Heat vs Mexico U-20

== Honors ==
- NPSL Lone Star Conference Champions 2018
- USL PDL Southern Conference Champions 2011
- USL PDL Mid South Division Champions 2011
- USL PDL Mid South Division Champions 2010
- USL PDL Mid South Division Champions 2009
- USL PDL Southern Conference Champions 2008
- USL PDL Champions 2007
- USL PDL Southern Conference Champions 2007
- USL PDL Mid South Division Champions 2007
- USL PDL Southern Conference Champions 2006
- USL PDL Mid South Division Champions 2006

== Stadiums ==
- Veterans Field; Laredo, Texas (2004)
- The Student Activity Center; Laredo (2005–2007)
- Texas A&M International University Soccer Complex; Laredo (2008–2023)
- PEG Energy Stadium; Laredo (2024–present)

== Average attendance ==
Attendance stats are calculated by averaging each team's self-reported home attendances from the historical match.

- 2004: 1,300 (2nd in PDL)
- 2005: 542 (15th in PDL)
- 2006: 705 (9th in PDL)
- 2007: 737 (10th in PDL)
- 2008: 974 (9th in PDL)
- 2009: 1,228 (7th in PDL)
- 2010: 989 (10th in PDL)
- 2011: 929 (11th in PDL)
- 2012: 718 (11th in PDL)
- 2013: 615 (17th in PDL)
- 2014: 610 (16th in PDL)
- 2015: 425 (18th in PDL)
