= Rochester Thunder =

- Full name: Rochester Thunder
- Nickname: The Thunder
- Founded: 2008
- Dissolved: 2010
- Ground: RCTC Stadium; Rochester, Minnesota
- Capacity: ????
- Owner: (United States) Todd Penz
- Head Coach: (England) Neil Cassidy
- League: USL Premier Development League
- 2010: 2nd, Heartland Division; Playoffs: Conference Semifinals
Home colors	Away colors

Original Rochester Thunder logo

Rochester Thunder was an American soccer team based in Rochester, Minnesota, United States. Founded in 2008, the team played in the USL Premier Development League (PDL), the fourth tier of the American Soccer Pyramid, in the Heartland Division of the Central Conference. The franchise folded at the end of the 2010 season and left the league thereafter.

The team was originally part of the official development system of the Minnesota Thunder former USL First Division franchise. They played their home games at RCTC Stadium on the campus of Rochester Community and Technical College. The team's colors were blue, white and silver.

== History ==
The Thunder joined the PDL in 2009, and played their first ever game on May 9, 2009, away at Des Moines Menace. The Thunder lost game 2–1, with the first goal in franchise history being scored by Brian Pederson.

The team was initially suspended from the USL PDL after their parent team, the Minnesota Thunder left the USL for the new North American Soccer League. However, the team was re-admitted to the PDL in 2010, and continued to compete.

Following the conclusion of the 2010 season the Thunder folded their operations. In a statement released on November 15, 2010 Thunder owner Dan Penz said "Due to unfortunate circumstances, the Rochester Thunder will no longer be able to continue. With the economy the way it is and only a handful of sponsors we could not make it work financially. This is a hard decision, but one that needed to be made".

== Players ==
=== Notable former players ===
This list of notable former players comprises players who went on to play professional soccer after playing for the team in the Premier Development League, or those who previously played professionally before joining the team.

- (Ghana) Samuel Asante
- (United States) Teal Bunbury
- (Guatemala) Juan Chang
- (United States) Paul Moran
- (United States) Brian Pederson
- (United States) Ben Sippola
- (Japan) Kentaro Takada

== Year-by-year ==
Year	Division	League	Regular season	Playoffs	Open Cup
2009	4	USL PDL	5th, Heartland	Did not qualify	Did not qualify
2010	4	USL PDL	2nd, Heartland	Conference Semifinals	Did not qualify

== Head coaches ==
- (England) Neil Cassidy (2009–2010)

== Stadia ==
- Stadium at Rochester Community and Technical College; Rochester, Minnesota (2009–2010)

== Average attendance ==
Attendance stats are calculated by averaging each team's self-reported home attendances from the historical match archive at https://web.archive.org/web/20131208011525/http://www.uslsoccer.com/history/index_E.html.

- 2009: 447
- 2010: 322
