= 2010 PDL season =

USL Premier Development League
- Official 2010 PDL Championship logo
- Season: 2010
- Champions: Portland Timbers U23's (1st Title)
- Regular Season Champions: Portland Timbers U23's (1st Title)
- Matches: 544
- Goals: 1,791 (3.29 per match)
- Best Player: (United States) Brent Richards Portland Timbers U23's
- Top goalscorer: (United States) Brandon Swartzendruber Thunder Bay Chill (15 Goals)
- Best goalkeeper: (United States) Ryan Meara Newark Ironbound Express
- Biggest home win: 9–0, Portland Timbers U23's over Spokane Spiders
- Biggest away win: 7–1, Tacoma Tide over Yakima Reds; 7–1, Reading United over New Jersey Rangers
- Highest scoring: 9 goals, Orange County Blue Star 7–2 Fresno Fuego; 9 goals, Spokane Spiders 2–7 Washington Crossfire; 9 goals, Lancaster Rattlers 3–6 Hollywood United Hitmen; 9 goals, Des Moines Menace 2–7 Thunder Bay Chill; 9 goals, Spokane Spiders 0–9 Portland Timbers U23's; 9 goals, Abbotsford Mariners 4–5 Spokane Spiders; 9 goals, Central Florida Kraze 2–7 Mississippi Brilla
- Highest attendance: 3,764, Des Moines Menace vs Rochester Thunder
- Lowest attendance: 20, Chicago Fire Premier vs Forest City London
- Average attendance: 550

The 2010 USL Premier Development League season was the 16th season of the PDL. The regular season began on April 24, 2010, and ended on July 26. The league consisted of 67 teams across eight divisions. The playoffs began on Friday, July 30 and concluded with the PDL Championship Game on August 8. As in previous years, the PDL Championship Game was broadcast live on Fox Soccer Channel in the United States, with commentary by Kenn Tomasch and Jon Billings.

The Portland Timbers U23's ended the season as national champions, beating Thunder Bay Chill 4–1 in the 2010 PDL Championship game. The Timbers also had the best regular season record, winning all their 16 games, scoring 53 goals and conceding just six along the way. In doing so the Saplings became the first team to post a perfect PDL regular season record since the Jackson Chargers in 1998, the first regular season champion to win the playoffs since the Central Coast Roadrunners in 1996, and the first team in PDL history to go through an entire PDL regular season and playoff campaign without posting a loss or a tie.

Portland Timbers U23's striker Brent Richards was named League MVP and Rookie of the Year for his stellar campaign with the national champions, while Timbers head coach Jim Rilatt was named Coach of the Year. Joe Tait of the Baton Rouge Capitals was named Defender of the Year after scoring six goals and an assist in 12 games, and helping his team to the national final four. Ryan Meara of Newark Ironbound Express was named Goalkeeper of the Year after recording an impressive eight shutout wins in only 12 games played, and ranking fourth in the league in goals-against average at 0.666.

Players from Canadian side Thunder Bay Chill led the majority of the statistical categories, with striker Brandon Swartzendruber leading the league with 15 goals, while his teammate Gustavo Oliveira led the league with 13 assists. Portland Timbers U23's goalkeeper Jacob Gleeson enjoyed the best goalkeeping statistics, allowing just five goals in 15 games and earning a 0.360 GAA average.

== Changes from 2009 ==
=== Name changes ===
- El Paso Patriots changed their name to Chivas El Paso Patriots after signing a formal partnership with Mexican side Guadalajara.
- Los Angeles Legends were taken over by the ownership group of the Los Angeles-based amateur side LA Blues, and rebranded themselves Los Angeles Azul Legends.
- Ocean City Barons changed their name to Ocean City Nor'easters after splitting from the South Jersey Barons Youth Academy and holding a "name the team" contest to decide their new nickname.
- Reading Rage became an official minor league affiliate of MLS expansion team Philadelphia Union, and renamed themselves Reading United.
- Seattle Wolves merged with a local youth soccer organization and renamed themselves Washington Crossfire.

=== New franchises ===
- Eight franchises were announced as joining the league this year:

| Team name | Metro area | Location | Previous affiliation |
|---|---|---|---|
| (New York (state)) Albany BWP Highlanders | Albany area | Schenectady, NY | expansion |
| Bermuda Hogges | Bermuda | Hamilton, Bermuda | USL Second Division |
| (New Jersey) Central Jersey Spartans | Central New Jersey area | Lawrenceville, NJ | expansion |
| (Ohio) Dayton Dutch Lions | Dayton area | Bellbrook, OH | expansion |
| (Florida) Fort Lauderdale Schulz Academy | Fort Lauderdale area | Lauderhill, FL | expansion |
| (Maine) Portland Phoenix | State of Maine | Portland, ME | expansion |
| Vermont Voltage | State of Vermont | St. Albans, VT | returning from hiatus |
| (Massachusetts) Western Mass Pioneers | Springfield (MA) area | Ludlow, MA | USL Second Division |

=== Folding ===
- Nine teams were announced as leaving the league prior to the beginning of the season:
  - Austin Aztex U23 – Austin, Texas
  - Bakersfield Brigade – Bakersfield, California
  - Cary Clarets – Cary, North Carolina
  - Cascade Surge – Salem, Oregon
  - Fort Wayne Fever – Fort Wayne, Indiana
  - Fredericksburg Gunners – Fredericksburg, Virginia
  - Panama City Pirates – Panama City, Florida
  - Rhode Island Stingrays – East Providence, Rhode Island
  - Virginia Legacy – Williamsburg, Virginia

== Standings ==
Key to colours in group tables
Team won the Division Title
Team qualified for playoff berth

Note: The first tie-breaker in PDL standings is head-to-head results between teams tied on points, which is why some teams with inferior goal differences finish ahead in the standings.

=== Central Conference ===
==== Great Lakes Division ====
| Pos | Team | Pld | W | L | T | GF | GA | GD | Pts |
|---|---|---|---|---|---|---|---|---|---|
| 1 | Michigan Bucks | 16 | 11 | 3 | 2 | 43 | 14 | +29 | 35 |
| 2 | Forest City London | 16 | 10 | 1 | 5 | 42 | 14 | +28 | 35 |
| 3 | Dayton Dutch Lions | 16 | 8 | 3 | 5 | 32 | 20 | +12 | 29 |
| 4 | Chicago Fire Premier | 16 | 9 | 5 | 2 | 28 | 12 | +16 | 29 |
| 5 | Indiana Invaders | 16 | 8 | 7 | 1 | 23 | 25 | −2 | 25 |
| 6 | Cincinnati Kings | 16 | 6 | 6 | 4 | 31 | 28 | +3 | 22 |
| 7 | Toronto Lynx | 16 | 4 | 11 | 1 | 15 | 37 | −22 | 13 |
| 8 | Kalamazoo Outrage | 16 | 3 | 13 | 0 | 17 | 55 | −38 | 9 |
| 9 | Cleveland Internationals | 16 | 2 | 12 | 2 | 15 | 41 | −26 | 8 |

==== Heartland Division ====
| Pos | Team | Pld | W | L | T | GF | GA | GD | Pts |
|---|---|---|---|---|---|---|---|---|---|
| 1 | Thunder Bay Chill | 16 | 12 | 2 | 2 | 40 | 12 | +28 | 38 |
| 2 | Rochester Thunder | 16 | 10 | 3 | 3 | 22 | 10 | +12 | 33 |
| 3 | Real Colorado Foxes | 16 | 7 | 3 | 6 | 26 | 18 | +8 | 27 |
| 4 | Des Moines Menace | 16 | 6 | 3 | 7 | 30 | 23 | +7 | 25 |
| 5 | St. Louis Lions | 16 | 5 | 7 | 4 | 23 | 21 | +2 | 19 |
| 6 | Springfield Demize | 16 | 1 | 12 | 3 | 10 | 37 | −27 | 6 |
| 7 | Kansas City Brass | 16 | 1 | 12 | 3 | 14 | 44 | −30 | 6 |

=== Eastern Conference ===
==== Mid Atlantic Division ====
| Pos | Team | Pld | W | L | T | GF | GA | GD | Pts |
|---|---|---|---|---|---|---|---|---|---|
| 1 | Reading United | 16 | 10 | 2 | 4 | 40 | 14 | +26 | 34 |
| 2 | Newark Ironbound Express | 16 | 10 | 3 | 3 | 29 | 12 | +17 | 33 |
| 3 | Central Jersey Spartans | 16 | 8 | 5 | 3 | 31 | 23 | +8 | 27 |
| 4 | Carolina Dynamo | 16 | 7 | 5 | 4 | 30 | 23 | +7 | 25 |
| 5 | Northern Virginia Royals | 16 | 6 | 6 | 4 | 24 | 28 | −4 | 22 |
| 6 | Ocean City Nor'easters | 16 | 5 | 6 | 5 | 23 | 25 | −2 | 20 |
| 7 | West Virginia Chaos | 16 | 6 | 9 | 1 | 21 | 26 | −5 | 19 |
| 8 | Hampton Roads Piranhas | 16 | 4 | 7 | 5 | 18 | 31 | −13 | 17 |
| 9 | New Jersey Rangers | 16 | 5 | 11 | 0 | 18 | 37 | −19 | 15 |
| 10 | Bermuda Hogges | 16 | 4 | 11 | 1 | 9 | 25 | −16 | 13 |

==== Northeast Division ====
| Pos | Team | Pld | W | L | T | GF | GA | GD | Pts |
|---|---|---|---|---|---|---|---|---|---|
| 1 | Ottawa Fury | 16 | 11 | 2 | 3 | 33 | 10 | +23 | 36 |
| 2 | Portland Phoenix | 16 | 10 | 2 | 4 | 37 | 14 | +23 | 34 |
| 3 | Albany BWP Highlanders | 16 | 10 | 4 | 2 | 32 | 21 | +11 | 32 |
| 4 | Long Island Rough Riders | 16 | 8 | 4 | 4 | 25 | 20 | +5 | 28 |
| 5 | Vermont Voltage | 16 | 5 | 7 | 4 | 22 | 31 | −9 | 19 |
| 6 | Western Mass Pioneers | 16 | 4 | 6 | 6 | 17 | 20 | −3 | 18 |
| 7 | New Hampshire Phantoms | 16 | 3 | 9 | 4 | 10 | 23 | −13 | 13 |
| 8 | Brooklyn Knights | 16 | 3 | 12 | 1 | 24 | 42 | −18 | 10 |
| 9 | Westchester Flames | 16 | 1 | 9 | 6 | 13 | 32 | −19 | 9 |

=== Southern Conference ===
==== Mid South Division ====
| Pos | Team | Pld | W | L | T | GF | GA | GD | Pts |
|---|---|---|---|---|---|---|---|---|---|
| 1 | Laredo Heat | 16 | 9 | 5 | 2 | 36 | 19 | +17 | 29 |
| 2 | Houston Leones | 16 | 7 | 5 | 4 | 24 | 20 | +4 | 25 |
| 3 | DFW Tornados | 16 | 7 | 5 | 4 | 23 | 19 | +4 | 25 |
| 4 | West Texas United Sockers | 16 | 6 | 7 | 3 | 20 | 24 | −4 | 21 |
| 5 | Chivas El Paso Patriots | 16 | 6 | 6 | 4 | 18 | 21 | −3 | 19 (Note: Chivas El Paso Patriots and Rio Grande Valley Bravos deducted three points for league rules infringement) |
| 6 | Rio Grande Valley Bravos | 16 | 3 | 10 | 3 | 12 | 30 | −18 | 9 |

==== Southeast Division ====
| Pos | Team | Pld | W | L | T | GF | GA | GD | Pts |
|---|---|---|---|---|---|---|---|---|---|
| 1 | Mississippi Brilla | 14 | 11 | 0 | 3 | 41 | 14 | +27 | 36 |
| 2 | Baton Rouge Capitals | 14 | 9 | 2 | 3 | 30 | 15 | +15 | 30 |
| 3 | Atlanta Blackhawks | 14 | 6 | 4 | 4 | 27 | 31 | −4 | 22 |
| 4 | Central Florida Kraze | 14 | 6 | 5 | 3 | 22 | 17 | +5 | 21 |
| 5 | New Orleans Jesters | 14 | 6 | 6 | 2 | 30 | 22 | +8 | 20 |
| 6 | Bradenton Academics | 14 | 5 | 5 | 4 | 19 | 15 | +4 | 19 |
| 7 | Nashville Metros | 14 | 1 | 10 | 3 | 8 | 34 | −26 | 6 |
| 8 | Fort Lauderdale Schulz Academy | 14 | 0 | 12 | 2 | 5 | 34 | −29 | 2 |

=== Western Conference ===
==== Northwest Division ====
| Pos | Team | Pld | W | L | T | GF | GA | GD | Pts |
|---|---|---|---|---|---|---|---|---|---|
| 1 | Portland Timbers U23's (R) | 16 | 16 | 0 | 0 | 53 | 6 | +47 | 48 |
| 2 | Kitsap Pumas | 16 | 12 | 2 | 2 | 38 | 14 | +24 | 38 |
| 3 | Tacoma Tide | 16 | 9 | 4 | 3 | 33 | 20 | +13 | 30 |
| 4 | Victoria Highlanders | 16 | 7 | 6 | 3 | 27 | 24 | +3 | 24 |
| 5 | Washington Crossfire | 16 | 6 | 8 | 2 | 35 | 31 | +4 | 20 |
| 6 | Vancouver Whitecaps Residency | 16 | 4 | 9 | 3 | 27 | 37 | −10 | 15 |
| 7 | Abbotsford Mariners | 16 | 4 | 11 | 1 | 25 | 44 | −19 | 13 |
| 8 | Yakima Reds | 16 | 4 | 12 | 0 | 18 | 42 | −24 | 12 |
| 9 | Spokane Spiders | 16 | 2 | 12 | 2 | 26 | 64 | −38 | 8 |

(R) Regular Season Champions

==== Southwest Division ====
| Pos | Team | Pld | W | L | T | GF | GA | GD | Pts |
|---|---|---|---|---|---|---|---|---|---|
| 1 | Ventura County Fusion | 16 | 11 | 4 | 1 | 35 | 12 | +23 | 34 |
| 2 | Hollywood United Hitmen | 16 | 10 | 3 | 3 | 41 | 20 | +21 | 33 |
| 3 | Orange County Blue Star | 16 | 9 | 3 | 4 | 42 | 24 | +18 | 31 |
| 4 | Fresno Fuego | 16 | 8 | 4 | 4 | 42 | 33 | +9 | 28 |
| 5 | Southern California Seahorses | 16 | 6 | 7 | 3 | 25 | 28 | −3 | 21 |
| 6 | Los Angeles Azul Legends | 16 | 5 | 8 | 3 | 27 | 33 | −6 | 18 |
| 7 | Lancaster Rattlers | 16 | 3 | 8 | 5 | 27 | 51 | −24 | 14 |
| 8 | BYU Cougars | 16 | 4 | 10 | 2 | 17 | 27 | −10 | 14 |
| 9 | Ogden Outlaws | 16 | 2 | 11 | 3 | 22 | 50 | −28 | 9 |

== Playoffs ==
=== Format ===
The 2010 PDL playoffs featured 16 teams, down from 24 the previous year. The format had each division winner play against the second-place team in their counterpart division within their respective conference.

=== Bracket ===
Conference Semifinals
NW1 | (Oregon) Portland Timbers U23's | 2
SW2 | (California) Hollywood United Hitmen | 1
Western Conference
SW1 | (California) Ventura County Fusion | 1 (3)
NW2 | (Washington (state)) Kitsap Pumas (AET/PSO) | 1 (5)
NE1 | (Ontario) Ottawa Fury | 2
MA2 | (New Jersey) Newark Ironbound Express | 0
Eastern Conference
MA1 | (Pennsylvania) Reading United | 2
NE2 | (Maine) Portland Phoenix | 1
HL1 | (Ontario) Thunder Bay Chill | 1
GL2 | (Ontario) Forest City London | 0
Central Conference
GL1 | Michigan Bucks | 2
HL2 | (Minnesota) Rochester Thunder | 0
MS1 | (Texas) Laredo Heat | 1 (5)
SE2 | (Louisiana) Baton Rouge Capitals (AET/PSO) | 1 (6)
Southern Conference
SE1 | Mississippi Brilla | 2 (5)
MS2 | (Texas) Houston Leones (AET/PSO) | 2 (6)

Conference Finals
NW1 | (Oregon) Portland Timbers U23's | 2
NW2 | (Washington (state)) Kitsap Pumas | 1
NE1 | (Ontario) Ottawa Fury | 2
MA1 | (Pennsylvania) Reading United | 3
HL1 | (Ontario) Thunder Bay Chill (AET) | 2
GL1 | Michigan Bucks | 1
SE2 | (Louisiana) Baton Rouge Capitals | 2
MS2 | (Texas) Houston Leones | 1

PDL Semifinals
NW1 | (Oregon) Portland Timbers U23's | 2
MA1 | (Pennsylvania) Reading United | 1
HL1 | (Ontario) Thunder Bay Chill | 2
SE2 | (Louisiana) Baton Rouge Capitals | 1

PDL Championship
NW1 | (Oregon) Portland Timbers U23's | 4
HL1 | (Ontario) Thunder Bay Chill | 1
Third place
MA1 | (Pennsylvania) Reading United | 2 (2)
SE2 | (Louisiana) Baton Rouge Capitals (PSO) | 2 (4)

=== Conference semifinals ===
July 30, 2010
3:00 PM EDT

| Michigan Bucks | 2–0 | (Minnesota) Rochester Thunder |
|---|---|---|
| Uzoigwe 14'; Robles (yellow card) 16'; St. Louis 54' | (Report) | Bonilla (yellow card) 31' |

Chapples Park Stadium
Thunder Bay, ON
Attendance: 515
Referee: David Barrie (USA)

July 30, 2010
5:30 PM EDT

| (Ontario) Thunder Bay Chill | 1–0 | (Ontario) Forest City London |
|---|---|---|
| Swartzendruber 5'; Buthelezi (yellow card) 45'; Heck (yellow card) 65'; Colaizzi (yellow card) 69' | (Report) | Morris (yellow card) 17'; Haworth (yellow card) 46'; Cekic (yellow card) 68'; Bibby (yellow card) 90' |

Chapples Park Stadium
Thunder Bay, ON
Attendance: 1,485
Referee: Gianni Facchini (USA)

July 30, 2010
5:00 PM CDT

| (Texas) Laredo Heat | 1–1 (AET) | (Louisiana) Baton Rouge Capitals |
|---|---|---|
| Garcia 17'; Gunderson (yellow card) 21'; Bayona (yellow card) 63'; Lewis (yellow card) 73'; Mulamba (yellow card) 80' (yellow-red card); Lara (yellow card) 85'; Ibarra (yellow card) 97' | (Report) | Williams (yellow card) 7'; McCubbin (yellow card) 17'; Chagnard 78' |
Penalties
| Galvan (penalty scored); Hernandez (penalty missed); Bautista (penalty scored); Garza (penalty scored); Abalos (penalty scored); Hergert (penalty scored); Lewis (penalty missed) | 5–6 | (penalty scored) Callon; (penalty scored) Anderson; (penalty scored) Tait; (penalty scored) Hayers; (penalty missed) Williams; (penalty scored) Chagnard; (penalty scored) Gordon |

Harper Davis Stadium
Jackson, MS
Attendance: 215
Referee: Arthur Odom (USA)

July 30, 2010
7:30 PM CDT

| Mississippi Brilla | 2–2 (AET) | (Texas) Houston Leones |
|---|---|---|
| Buffington 56' 104' | (Report) | Eastman (yellow card) 68' (yellow-red card) 95'; Vallentine 69'; Simon 112' |
Penalties
| Penalty scored Penalty missed | 5–6 | Penalty scored Penalty missed |

Harper Davis Stadium
Jackson, MS
Attendance: 1,453
Referee: Jared Peeler (USA)

July 31, 2010
4:00 PM EDT

| (Pennsylvania) Reading United | 2–1 | (Maine) Portland Phoenix |
|---|---|---|
| Mulholland 73'; Frimpong 89' | (Report) | Reilly (red card) 6'; Weightman (yellow card) 8'; Banks 55' |

Algonquin College
Ottawa, ON
Attendance: 126
Referee: Joe Audi (USA)

July 31, 2010
1:30 PM PDT

| (Oregon) Portland Timbers U23's | 2–1 | (California) Hollywood United Hitmen |
|---|---|---|
| Braun (yellow card) 34' (goal) 63'; Evans 66'; Dugoni (yellow card) 73' (yellow-red card) 88'; Ogunyemi (yellow card) 90' | (Report) | Whitfield 3' (yellow card) 90'; Corona (yellow card) 31'; Morales (yellow card) 56'; Spitz (yellow card) 90' |

Bremerton Memorial Stadium
Bremerton, WA
Referee: Manuel Soleded (USA)

July 31, 2010
7:00 PM EDT

| (Ontario) Ottawa Fury | 2–0 | (New Jersey) Newark Ironbound Express |
|---|---|---|
| Rigby (yellow card) 17'; Theissen (yellow card) 44'; Struthers 67' 72' | (Report) | Konopelsky (yellow card) 21'; Grato (yellow card) 63'; Niebles (yellow card) 72' |

Algonquin College
Ottawa, ON
Attendance: 528
Referee: Marvin Mohring (USA)

July 31, 2010
5:00 PM PDT

| (Washington (state)) Kitsap Pumas | 1–1 (AET) | (California) Ventura County Fusion |
|---|---|---|
| Gordley 2'; Scott (yellow card) 45'; Besagno (yellow card) 77' | (Report) | Da. Berrera 30' (yellow card) 42' (red card) 112'; Guerrero (yellow card) 54' (red card) 120' |
Penalties
| Hepple (penalty scored); Hyde (penalty scored); Cascio (penalty scored); Gray (penalty scored); Wallace (penalty scored) | 5–3 | (penalty scored) Johnson; (penalty missed) Nicholson; (penalty scored) Becerra; (penalty scored) Jagne |

Bremerton Memorial Stadium
Bremerton, WA
Attendance: 1,194
Referee: Nestor Chavez (USA)

=== Conference finals ===
July 31, 2010
5:30 PM EDT

| (Ontario) Thunder Bay Chill | 2–1 (AET) | Michigan Bucks |
|---|---|---|
| Robertson (yellow card) 20'; Abegar (yellow card) 37'; Intermoia (yellow card) 76'; Swartzendruber 84' 118' | (Report) | Uzoigwe 79'; Fuzetti (yellow card) 87'; C. Givens (yellow card) 99' |

Chapples Park Stadium
Thunder Bay, ON
Attendance: 1,496
Referee: David Barrie (USA)

August 1, 2010
4:00 PM EDT

| (Ontario) Ottawa Fury | 2–3 | (Pennsylvania) Reading United |
|---|---|---|
| Theissen (yellow card) 31'; Dasah 73' 90' | (Report) | Witmer 35' 49'; Hogan (yellow card) 58' (yellow-red card) 75'; Mulholland 76' (yellow card) 76' |

Algonquin College
Ottawa, ON
Attendance: 436
Referee: Mathew Arduini (USA)

August 1, 2010
7:00 PM CDT

| (Texas) Houston Leones | 1–2 | (Louisiana) Baton Rouge Capitals |
|---|---|---|
| Richards 39' (yellow card) 60'; Zelko (yellow card) 51'; Phillips (yellow card) 82' | (Report) | Settle 76'; Anderson 88' (yellow card) 89' |

Harper Davis Stadium
Jackson, MS
Attendance: 156
Referee: Doug Ferguson (USA)

August 1, 2010
5:00 PM PDT

| (Washington (state)) Kitsap Pumas | 1–2 | (Oregon) Portland Timbers U23's |
|---|---|---|
| Hyde (yellow card) 40'; Lee 42'; Phillips (yellow card) 58'; Fishbaugher (yellow card) 88' | (Report) | Ramsey 24'; Farfan 81' |

Bremerton Memorial Stadium
Bremerton, WA
Attendance: 1,200
Referee: Armando Villareal (USA)

=== PDL Semifinals ===
August 6, 2010
5:00 PM PDT

| (Ontario) Thunder Bay Chill | 2–1 | (Louisiana) Baton Rouge Capitals |
|---|---|---|
| Abegar 78'; Intermoia 81'; Heck (yellow card) 85' | (Report) | Williams 75' |

PGE Park
Portland, OR
Referee: Paul Northman (USA)

August 6, 2010
7:30 PM PDT

| (Oregon) Portland Timbers U23's | 2–1 | (Pennsylvania) Reading United |
|---|---|---|
| Ogunyemi 48'; Braun 78'; Granger (yellow card) 79' | (Report) | Houapeu 74' |

PGE Park
Portland, OR
Attendance: 2,359
Referee: Artem Sher (USA)

=== Third-Place Game ===
August 7, 2010
1:00 PDT

| (Pennsylvania) Reading United | 2–2 | (Louisiana) Baton Rouge Capitals |
|---|---|---|
| Sapong 2'; Mulholland 28' | (Report) | Hedges 26' (o.g.); McCubbin (yellow card) 26'; Tait 45'; Magill (yellow card) 89' |
Penalties
| Reid (penalty missed); Houapeu (penalty scored); Wenger (penalty scored); Mulholland (penalty missed) | 2–4 | (penalty scored) Tait; (penalty scored) Settle; (penalty scored) Ju. Portillo; (penalty missed) Williams; (penalty scored) Callon |

PGE Park
Portland, OR
Referee: Desmond Miller (USA)

=== PDL Final ===
August 7, 2010
4:00 PM PDT

| (Oregon) Portland Timbers U23's | 4–1 | (Ontario) Thunder Bay Chill |
|---|---|---|
| Hasson 30'; Richards 51' 62'; Ogunyemi (yellow card) 52'; Evans (yellow card) 54'; Braun 76' | (Report) | Heck (red card) 16'; Oliveira (yellow card) 22' (goal) 45'; Colaizzi (yellow card) 72' |

PGE Park
Portland, OR
Attendance: 3,729
Referee: Maurizio Laudani (USA)

Championship MVP: (United States) Brent Richards (POR)

== Award winners and finalists ==
MVP: (United States) Brent Richards (Portland Timbers U23's) (winner), (Uganda) Moses Aduny (Mississippi Brilla), (Canada) Andrew Rigby (Ottawa Fury), (United States) Brandon Swartzendruber (Thunder Bay Chill)
Scoring Champion: (United States) Brandon Swartzendruber (Thunder Bay Chill) 35 Points (15 Goals, 5 Assists)
Golden Boot: (United States) Brandon Swartzendruber (Thunder Bay Chill) (15 Goals)
Assists Champion: (Brazil) Gustavo Oliveira (Thunder Bay Chill) 13 Assists
GAA Champion: (New Zealand) Jacob Gleeson (Portland Timbers U23's) 0.360 GAA
Rookie of the Year: (United States) Brent Richards (POR) (winner), (Norway) Fredrik Brustad (CF), (Germany) Dominic Reinold (NJ)
Defender of the Year: (England) Joe Tait (BR) (winner), (United States) Matt Hedges (REA), (United States) Mark Lee (KIT), (France) Alexis Pradié (OTT),
Goalkeeper of the Year: (United States) Ryan Meara (NWK)
Coach of the Year: (United States) Jim Rilatt (POR) (winner), (United States) Brendan Burke (REA), (United States) Dave Dixon (MIS), (Canada) Martin Painter (LON)

== All-League and All-Conference teams ==
=== Eastern Conference ===
F: (Canada) Will Beaugé (OTT), (Germany) Dominic Reinold (NJ), (United States) C. J. Sapong (REA)
M: (United States) Frank Alesci* (NWK), (England) Luke Mulholland (REA), (United States) Scott Rojo* (CAR)
D: (United States) Chris Christian (CJ), (England) John Fletcher (OcC), (United States) Matt Hedges* (REA), (France) Alexis Pradié* (OTT)
G: (United States) Ryan Meara* (NWK)

=== Central Conference ===
F: (Brazil) Gustavo Oliveira (TB), (United States) Brandon Swartzendruber (TB), (United States) Kenny Uzoigwe* (MIC)
M: (Republic of Ireland) Steven Beattie (CIN), (Republic of Ireland) Alan McGreal (LON), (United States) Jeremy Warman (KC)
D: (United States) C.J. Brown (KAL), (United States) Stewart Givens (MIC), (United States) Logan McDaniel (DM), (Germany) Sebastian Stihler (LON)
G: (Netherlands) Oscar Moens (DAY)

=== Southern Conference ===
F: (Uganda) Moses Aduny* (MIS), (United States) Ben Callon (BR), (United States) Ryan Maloney (ATL)
M: (Colombia) Jonathan Mendoza (CF), (Argentina) Lucas Paulini (MIS), (England) Carl Reynolds (NO)
D: (United States) Willie Hunt (MIS), (United States) Ryan McDonald (NAS), (Brazil) Guilherme Reis (BRD), (England) Joe Tait* (BR)
G: (United States) Leif Craddock (WTU)

=== Western Conference ===
F: (United States) Jaime Chavez (HU), (United States) Brent Richards* (POR), (Jamaica) Amani Walker (OrC)
M: (United States) Freddie Braun* (POR), (The Bahamas) Cameron Hepple (KIT), (Canada) Jordan Hughes (VIC)
D: (Canada) Mo Aziz (ABB), (United States) Ryan Kawulok (POR), (United States) Mark Lee* (KIT), (United States) Daniel Scott (KIT)
G. (New Zealand) Jake Gleeson (POR)

* denotes All-League player

== See also ==
- United Soccer Leagues 2010
- 2010 NPSL Season
- 2010 W-League Season
