= Kitsap Pumas =

Kitsap Soccer Club
- Full name: Kitsap Soccer Club
- Nickname: Pumas
- Founded: 2009; 17 years ago
- Dissolved: 2018; 8 years ago
- Stadium: Gordon Field, Kitsap County Fairgrounds; Bremerton, Washington
- Capacity: 1,500
- 2018 (NPSL): 3rd, Northwest Conference; Playoffs: DNQ
| Home colors | Away colors |

Kitsap SC Pumas was an American soccer team based in Bremerton, Washington, United States. The team played in the National Premier Soccer League (NPSL), the fourth tier of the American soccer pyramid. From its foundation in 2009 to 2016, the club played in the Premier Development League (PDL), as a professional club. As part of the agreement upon leaving PDL after the 2016 season, the club was unable to use the "Kitsap Pumas" name during the 2017 season while playing in NPSL. The club was officially renamed Kitsap SC until September 1, 2017 when the Pumas name was restored. The club announced on July 20, 2018 that it would cease operations due to declining attendance.

Kitsap won several titles including the 2011 USL PDL national championship. They defeated the Laredo Heat 1–0 in the 2011 PDL Championship game on August 6, 2011 held on their home field in Bremerton.

The team played its home games initially at the Bremerton High School Memorial Stadium, later at Gordon Field at the Kitsap County Fairgrounds. The team's colors were blue, white and gold.

Kitsap had fielded an indoor team which played in the Northwest Division of the Premier Arena Soccer League for 4 seasons from the 2010–11 season until the 2013–14 season.

== History ==
The long-term goal of the organization was to build the club up into a USL Pro side. Club owner Robin Waite was a minority owner in the USL 1 Seattle Sounders prior to its move to Major League Soccer and acquired their USL rights. A USL PDL franchise was announced on December 17, 2008.

The Pumas were one of four expansion teams in the NW Division of 2009 PDL season along with the Victoria Highlanders, Portland Timbers U23s, and Seattle Wolves. The Pumas played their first official game on May 2, 2009, a 5–0 victory over the Spokane Spiders, with the first goal in franchise history being scored by Tony Kerr. The Pumas qualified for the Lamar Hunt U.S. Open Cup in their first year beating the Cascade Surge 3–0 at home on the final day of qualifying, outlasting the Portland Timbers U23's by 1 point. Their stay in the tournament was a short one as they lost to the USL Division I Portland Timbers 3–0 in front of a record crowd of 2,128.

Kitsap rebounded with victories in its next five games to take a commanding lead in the Northwest Division. The Pumas became the first team in the PDL to clinch a playoff spot, doing so on July 5. They missed a chance to take the division when they gave up a goal in stoppage time against the Timbers U23 on July 4, but defeated the Abbotsford Mariners 1–0 on July 11 as Stephen Phillips scored off an Alex Megson assist to earn the team's first ever Northwest Division title and a first round playoff bye.

Kitsap went on to beat the Seattle Wolves in their first ever play-off match 2–0 in front of a new club record attendance of 2,328, before losing to the Ventura County Fusion 2–1 in the PDL quarterfinals in Laredo, Texas.

On August 11, it was announced that head coach John Wedge would not return for the 2010 PDL season. It was later revealed by Wedge that the loss to the Fusion cost him his job. On November 9, 2009, the club announced the hiring of Seattle University coach Pete Fewing as its new head coach.

Kitsap got off to another strong start for the 2010 season as they won their first five games to qualify for the U.S. Open Cup for the second straight season. They defeated the NPSL Bay Area Ambassadors 4–2 for their first ever win in the tournament. They lost to the Portland Timbers in the second round, the second time in as many years they were eliminated by the then USL-1 club. The Pumas also had problems with the Portland Timbers U23's as well, losing 3–0 and 1–0 in regular season contests. Despite not repeating as division champs, Kitsap clinched the second and final playoff spot by defeating Vancouver 6–2 on July 20.

Kitsap was selected to host the Western Conference playoffs and outlasted the defending champs Ventura County Fusion on penalty kicks in their semi-final match. It was the first time in club history that a match had gone penalty kicks. Dustyn Brim made a save while Jamel Wallace converted the winning penalty attempt. But the Pumas did not have enough energy to outlast the eventual PDL national champions, losing 2–1 to the Portland Timbers U23's.

That fall, the team entered the Professional Arena Soccer League for the 2010–11 indoor season,

The Pumas made a strong start to the 2011 season, but their early results were matched by Portland Timbers U23's, who also made a strong start to the season, with both teams tied in all statistical qualifiers for the U.S. Open Cup. Instead of holding a lottery, the Pumas persuaded the Timbers and the USL to let their next regular season match against each other double as a qualification for the tournament. Kitsap beat the Timbers 3–2 as Robby Christner scored a brace while Bryan Meredith – who was drafted by Seattle Sounders FC – made a key save on a penalty kick to help the Pumas become the first PDL team to qualify for the Open Cup their first three years as an organization. The Pumas defeated the Chivas El Paso Patriots in a first round Open Cup match in penalty kicks. Goalkeeper Zac Lubin – who was starting in place of an injured Meredith – held the Patriots scoreless for the entire match. He then made two saves in the penalty shootout, which went nine rounds before Bryan Burke converted in the ninth round to send the team into the second round of the tournament. They defeated the Real Colorado Foxes 3–1 to set up a first-ever official meeting with the Seattle Sounders FC (the two teams had previously played in closed door scrimmages over the last two years). Seattle defeated Kitsap 2–1 in a match that saw the Pumas miss on two chances on goal to upset the two-time defending Cup champions.

Back in league play, Kitsap stayed undefeated for much of the season, clinching a second division championship with a scoreless draw against Abbotsford. They lost their first ever international friendly – a 1–0 defeat against Football League Two side Port Vale – and their last game of the season against Victoria Highlanders, missing another chance to run the table for the regular season. The playoffs were a different story, as Kitsap defeated Ventura County Fusion 1–0 and upset the Fresno Fuego 1–0 to win its first ever Western Conference title. The match against Fresno ended a 25-game winning streak by the Fuego. Daniel Scott scored in injury time while Meredith made a save off a penalty kick attempt by PDL MVP Milton Blanco a few seconds later to ensure the win. Kitsap returned home to host the PDL championship and made it pay off, as they defeated the Thunder Bay Chill 3–1 and the Laredo Heat 1–0 to win its first ever national title. Christner scored the game's lone goal off an assist by Burke.

On Oct 27, Waite announced that Fewing would not return next season. A month later, the club announced that assistant coach James Ritchie would take over the head coaching spot.

In the 2015 Lamar Hunt U.S. Open Cup, Kitsap was eliminated in the second round by Seattle Sounders FC 2, the USL reserve side of the MLS club.

In the 2016 Lamar Hunt U.S. Open Cup third round, Kitsap upset Sacramento Republic FC of the USL, defeating them away 3–1 and earning a match against the Seattle Sounders. The Sounders would go on to defeat Kitsap 2–0.

=== NPSL ===
In November 2016, the club announced that it would move to the National Premier Soccer League and rename itself "Kitsap Soccer Club" beginning in fall 2017.

=== Dissolution ===
Kitsap SC announced on July 20, 2018 that it would cease operations due to declining attendance.

== Players ==
=== Notable former players ===
This list of notable former players comprises players who went on to play professional soccer after playing for the team in the Premier Development League, or those who previously played professionally before joining the team.

- (United States) Leon Abravanel
- (United States) Jason Cascio
- (United States) John Fishbaugher
- (The Bahamas) Cameron Hepple
- (England) Tony Kerr
- (United States) Austin Rogers
- (United States) Bryan Meredith
- (United States) Jamel Wallace
- (United States) Bryan Burke
- (United States) Daniel Scott
- (El Salvador) Derby Carrillo
- (United States) Brandon Scott
- (United States) Robin Casillas
- (Canada) Joel Waterman

== Record ==
=== Year-by-year ===
| Year | Division | League | Regular season | Playoffs | US Open Cup | Avg. attendance |
|---|---|---|---|---|---|---|
| 2009 | 4 | USL PDL | 1st, Northwest | Conference Finals | 1st round | 868 (11th in PDL) Playoffs: 2,329 Overall: 1,031 |
| 2010 | 4 | USL PDL | 2nd, Northwest | Conference Finals | 2nd round | 772 (13th in PDL) Playoffs: 1,197 Overall: 857 |
| 2011 | 4 | USL PDL | 1st, Northwest | Champions | 3rd round | 568 (18th in PDL) Playoffs: 1,329 Overall: 720 |
| 2012 | 4 | USL PDL | 3rd, Northwest | Conference Quarter-Finals | 1st round | 438 (24th in PDL) |
| 2013 | 4 | USL PDL | 5th, Northwest | did not qualify | did not qualify | 605 (18th in PDL) |
| 2014 | 4 | USL PDL | 1st, Northwest | Championship Final | did not qualify | 463 (19th in PDL) |
| 2015 | 4 | USL PDL | 1st, Northwest | Conference Semi-final | 2nd round | — |
| 2016 | 4 | USL PDL | 4th, Northwest | did not qualify | 4th round | — |
| 2017 | 4 | NPSL | 1st, Northwest | Region Semi-final | did not qualify | — |
| 2018 | 4 | NPSL | 3rd, Northwest | did not qualify | 1st round | — |

== Honors ==
- USL PDL Championships
  - Winners: 2011
  - Runners-up: 2014
- USL PDL Western Conference
  - Winners (2): 2011, 2014
  - Runners-up: 2009, 2010
- USL PDL Northwest Division
  - Winners (4): 2009, 2011, 2014, 2015
- NPSL Northwest Conference
  - Winners (1): 2017
- Lamar Hunt U.S. Open Cup
  - USL PDL Northwest Division Qualifier (6): 2009, 2010, 2011, 2012, 2015, 2016
  - NPSL Northwest Conference Qualifier (1): 2018
- Minor Cups
  - Narrows Bridge Bell Champions (3): 2009, 2010, 2011
  - Ruffneck Cup champions (4): 2012, 2013, 2014, 2015

== Head coaches ==
- (England) John Wedge (2009)
- (United States) Pete Fewing (2010–2011)
- (Scotland) James Ritchie (2012–2013)
- (United States) Andrew Chapman (2014)
- (Scotland) Cammy MacDonald (2015–2016)
- (United States) Roy Lassiter (2017)
- (United States) Liviu Bird (2018)

== Stadia ==
- Bremerton Memorial Stadium at Bremerton High School; Bremerton, Washington (2009–2012)
- Gordon Field Park, Kitsap County Fairgrounds (2013–2018)

== Crest ==
The official Kitsap Soccer Club crest was designed by Joel DuChesne, who won a competition held by the club to design a logo for the team prior to the 2009 season. Pumas owner Robin Waite said "We were floored when Joel's entry came it. It struck so completely at the heart of what the Kitsap Soccer Club is all about – traditional, authentic, yet modern, clean and looking to the future. He absolutely nailed it." As his prize, DuChesne was presented with tickets to the club's opening match against Tacoma Tide on May 15, 2009, and a pair of 2009 full-season tickets.
