= Tony Kerr =

English footballer

Personal information
- Full name: Anthony Victor Lance Kerr
- Date of birth: 21 December 1987 (age 38)
- Place of birth: Sandown, England
- Position: Midfielder

Senior career*
Years	Team	Apps	(Gls)
2008–2009	East Cowes Victoria Athletic		
2009–2010	Kitsap Pumas	14	(7)

International career^{‡}
2008–	England Beach Soccer	12	(6)
- * Club domestic league appearances and goals as of 20 July 2009 ‡ National team caps and goals as of 3 April 2009

Tony Kerr (born 21 December 1987) is an English former professional footballer who played as a midfielder. He represented the English National Beach Soccer team.

== Club career ==
Kerr started playing beach soccer at 14 years of age, fast gaining a reputation as a goalscorer on the English scene after scoring 48 goals in his first season, winning the England Beach Soccer golden foot award. Later, at 16 years old, Kerr again won the EBS golden foot, as well as earning a place in the England Squad and being named English Rookie of the Year.

On 23 April 2009, Kerr was announced to the press as a new signing for the Kitsap Pumas, a brand new professional soccer franchise playing out of Bremerton in the Premier Development League NorthWest Division. Kerr scored the first goal in Kitsap franchise history on 3 May 2009, in a 5–0 win over the Spokane Spiders. He finished his first professional season as Kitsap's second leading points scorer with 7 goals and 2 assists. He started both play-off games as the Pumas eventually lost to eventual PDL National Champions Ventura County Fusion in Laredo, Texas.

At the end of the 2009 season, it was announced that the Pumas would be extending his contract for the 2010 season; he was the first ever player to renew their contract with the club.

== International career ==
Karr has represented England at International level being capped for the Beach Soccer team earning his first call up age 16 and being named English Rookie of the Year.

Kerr returned to the international scene in 2008, scoring the winning penalty in his debut against Estonia in the FIFA Beach Soccer World Cup Qualifiers.

He continued to do well on the International scene, scoring 2 goals in three games against Turkey and Hungary, both during England's largely unsuccessful tour of France. In 2010, the Forward was named in a ten-man squad to tour the Canary Islands with the England Beach Soccer team after a years absence from the national team. Games included Spain, Switzerland and Germany.

== Personal ==
Tony is the younger brother of FIFA beach soccer coach Luke Kerr.
