= Jake Gleeson =

New Zealand footballer

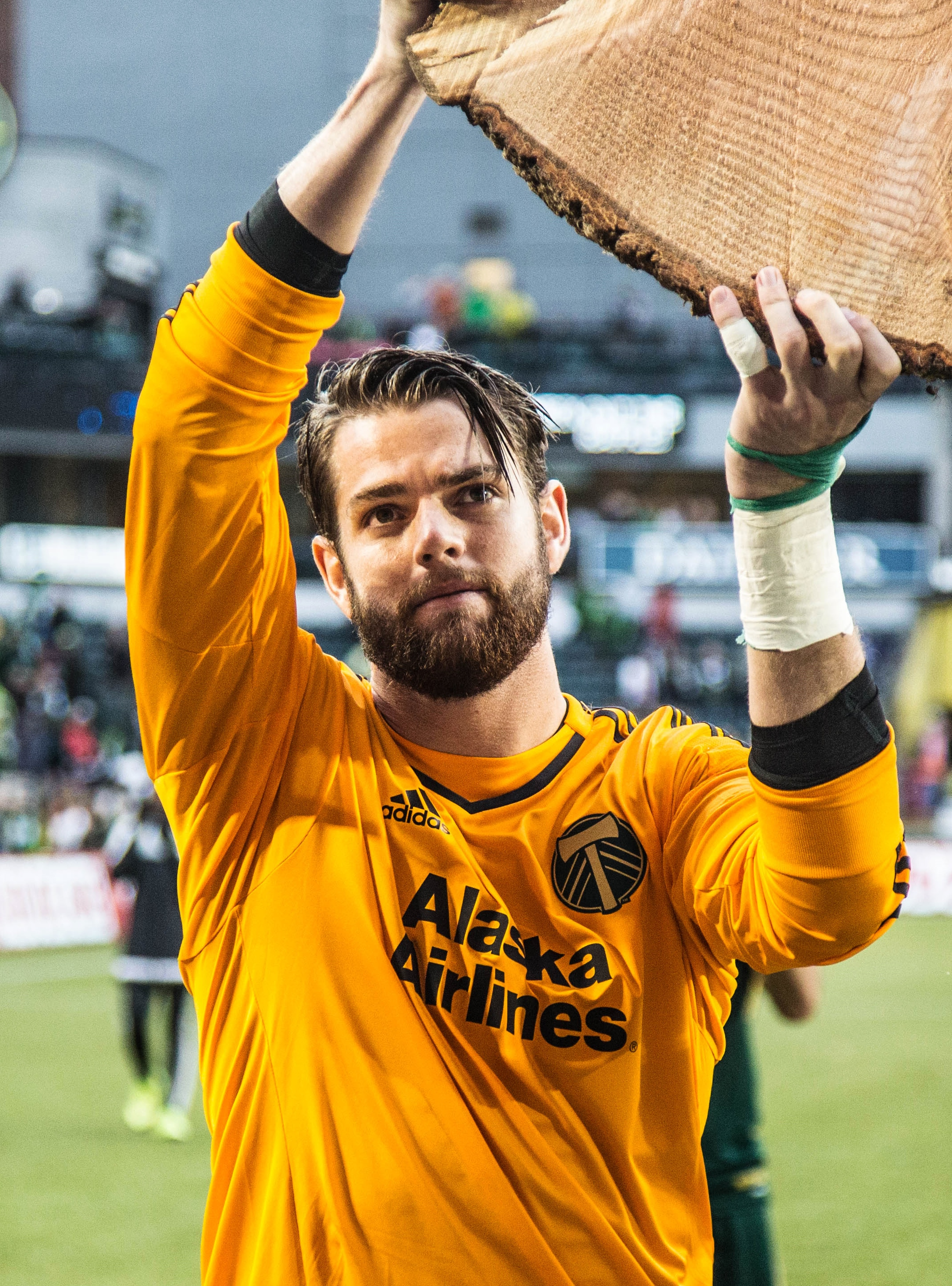
- Gleeson in November 2015

Personal information
- Full name: Jacob Christopher Gleeson
- Date of birth: 26 June 1990 (age 36)
- Place of birth: Palmerston North, New Zealand
- Height: 1.93 m (6 ft 4 in)
- Position: Goalkeeper

Senior career*
Years	Team	Apps	(Gls)
2007–2008	Western Suburbs FC		
2008–2010	Team Wellington	5	(0)
2010	Portland Timbers U23s	15	(0)
2011–2018	Portland Timbers	59	(0)
2014	→ Sacramento Republic (loan)	17	(0)
2015	→ Portland Timbers 2 (loan)	20	(0)
Total		116	(0)

International career^{‡}
2007	New Zealand U17	5	(0)
2008	New Zealand U20	1	(0)
2012	New Zealand U23	3	(0)
2011–2014	New Zealand	8	(0)
- * Club domestic league appearances and goals as of 4 November 2018 ‡ National team caps and goals as of 18 November 2014

Jacob Christopher Gleeson (born 26 June 1990) is a former New Zealand professional footballer who last played as a goalkeeper for American club Portland Timbers.

== Club career ==
=== Early career ===
Gleeson began his career playing for Western Suburbs FC of the Central Premier League. After an extremely impressive showing at the 2007 Under-17 World Cup in South Korea, Gleeson was offered week-long trials with English Premier League clubs Manchester United and Everton. During the trials, Gleeson impressed the management of both clubs but was suffering the effects of lingering illness, which management took into account. After the initial trial, Everton offered Gleeson a retrial which ultimately ended without an offer being made. Although Manchester United did not offer a retrial, they thought highly of Gleeson and goalkeeping coach Richard Harris promised to recommend Gleeson to other English clubs for a place in their academies.

Gleeson moved up to a higher division in 2008 by signing for Team Wellington of the ASB Championship, the national association football league of New Zealand, and spent the next two years with the club, featuring in 5 games in total.

=== Portland Timbers ===
Gleeson was offered a trial with Seattle Sounders FC of Major League Soccer in 2010 but declined the opportunity in favor of a guaranteed contract offered by the former USL incarnation of the Portland Timbers in preparation for their promotion to Major League Soccer. He was to train with the USL team but play for the team's USL Premier Development League affiliate, Portland Timbers U23s. In an interview with New Zealand media in April 2010, Gleeson stated, "I don't have a guaranteed spot but I'm in a really good position because I'm a youth player. I'll come in as the No3 goalie and try and work my way up from there", regarding his prospects of eventually making the transition from the Timbers-U23 team to senior roster.

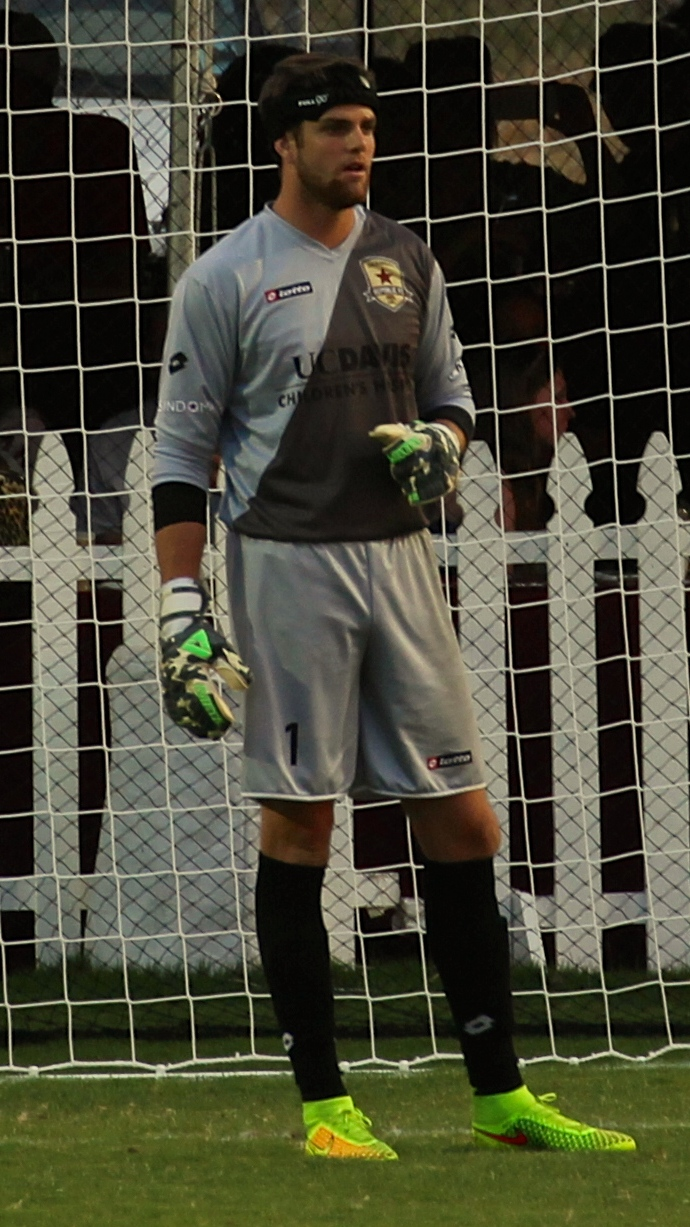
Gleeson playing for Sacramento Republic FC in a USL Pro match against Orange County Blues in 2014

In his first season with the club, Gleeson and the Timbers U-23 squad became PDL Champions. To begin the season, Gleeson logged 15 saves in three shutout performances to help the Timbers U-23s record wins over Tacoma Tide, Yakima Reds, and Spokane Spiders in a one-week period, earning him team of the week honors. By finishing with a 20–0–0 record, the team became the PDL's first undefeated championship team.

After training with the team throughout pre-season, Gleeson formally signed with the Major League Soccer Portland Timbers on 17 February 2011. He made his MLS debut on 26 March 2011 against Toronto FC as a second-half substitute for an injured Adin Brown.

Despite starting the season as the club's third-string goalkeeper, Gleeson started the first MLS home game in Timbers history and played all 90 minutes in the Timbers' 4–2 win over the Chicago Fire. Three days later, Gleeson pushed a difficult shot off the post in the 90th minute which would have given FC Dallas the game-tying goal. This save gave Gleeson his second MLS save of the week in five weeks.

On 18 February 2014 Gleeson was loaned out to Sacramento Republic FC as part of the loan agreement between MLS and USL Pro. He made 17 regular season appearances for Sacramento on this loan spell, allowing less than a goal per game, and posted the shutout in their 2–0 victory over Harrisburg City Islanders in the USL Pro Championship.

Despite starting the 2016 season as a backup, Gleeson was quickly thrown into action when starter Adam Larsen Kwarasey suffered a torn hand ligament. Over the first half of the season, Gleeson impressed as a #1 and earned the starting job over Kwarasey. Through 14 starts while Kwarasey was injured, Gleeson allowed 18 goals, while posting 70 saves and the Timbers' only 3 shutouts for the year.

In 2018, he had surgeries on his right shin due to stress fractures. Due to complications, he had eight further surgeries, which ended his career.

In 2020, Gleeson officially sued the Timbers physicians for malpractice and negligence. A jury in 2025 ruled in favor of Gleeson and he was awarded $20.6 million in damages.

== International career ==
Gleeson has represented New Zealand at the U-20 and U-17 levels. In 2007, he led the Junior All-Whites to the U-17 Oceania Football Confederation championship and a berth into the FIFA U-17 World Cup in Korea. Gleeson's performance in these tournaments led to his Premier League trials. In 2008, he led the U-20s to a third-place finish in the OFC championship tournament. Gleeson was given his first call up to the senior New Zealand team for a friendly match against China in March 2011, however Gleeson requested to be withdrawn due to injuries to goalkeepers in the Portland Timbers squad.

On 17 March 2011, New Zealand Head Coach Ricki Herbert called-up Gleeson for the friendly against China on 25 March as a substitute for the injured Mark Paston. Coach Herbert stated: "I'm excited to be able to see Jake. He's young and there's a lot of aspiration and desire. I actually spoke to him over the phone yesterday and he's just over the moon to be part of what we're doing. There is a chance that he will get some time on the pitch." The Portland Timbers however were injury-struck in the goalkeepers department at the time, so Gleeson asked Herbert for permission to stay in Canada in order to play in the MLS match that weekend. Herbert allowed Gleeson to compete for his MLS side Timbers.

He made his full international début as a substitute in a 0–3 friendly loss against Australia on 5 June 2011. Gleeson played the final 13 minutes and conceded one goal through a stoppage-time penalty kick. After not appearing for New Zealand since a 4–3 victory over the Solomon Islands on 10 June 2012, his sixth cap for his country, Gleeson was called up for friendlies against China and Thailand in November 2014.

== Career statistics ==
=== International ===
New Zealand national team
Year	Apps	Goals
2011	1	0
2012	5	0
2013	0	0
2014	2	0
Total	8	0

== Personal ==
Gleeson received his U.S. green card in 2012 which qualifies him as a domestic player for MLS roster purposes.

In October 2016 Gleeson was arrested in Lake Oswego, Oregon after a car crash and charged with driving under the influence, reckless driving and refusing a breathalyzer test. He pleaded no contest to driving under the influence and pleaded guilty to refusing a breathalyzer test, while the charge of reckless driving was dropped as part of a plea bargain. He paid US$1,140 in fines and was mandated to take an alcohol diversion program.

== Honours ==
=== Club ===
Portland Timbers U23s

- USL PDL Champions: 2010
- USL PDL Regular Season Champion: 2010
- USL PDL Western Conference Champion: 2010
- USL PDL Northwest Division Champion: 2010

Sacramento Republic FC

- USL Pro Championship: 2014

Portland Timbers

- MLS Cup: 2015
- Western Conference (playoffs): 2015

== See also ==
- List of current MLS players with national team caps
