= Kiana Swift =

Canadian-Tongan soccer player

Personal information
- Full name: Kiana Katalina Swift
- Date of birth: September 14, 2000 (age 26)
- Place of birth: Sooke, British Columbia, Canada
- Height: 5 ft 5 in (1.65 m)
- Position: Midfielder

Youth career
- Sooke SC
- Vancouver Island Wave

College career
Years	Team	Apps	(Gls)
2018–2022	UNBC Timberwolves	56	(2)

Senior career*
Years	Team	Apps	(Gls)
2019	Vancouver Island FC	6	(0)
2022	Victoria Highlanders		

International career^{‡}
2022–2023	Tonga	7	(2)
- * Club domestic league appearances and goals as of August 31, 2022 ‡ National team caps and goals as of December 1, 2023

Kiana Katalina Swift (born 14 September 2000) is a footballer. Born in Canada, she represents Tonga at international level.

== Early life ==
Swift played youth soccer with Sooke SC, before later joining the Vancouver Island Wave. She also played with the British Columbia provincial team.

== University career ==
In July 2017, she committed to attend the University of Northern British Columbia to play for the women's soccer team, beginning in the fall of 2018. In her first season, she was named the UNBC Female Rookie of the Year. In 2019 and 2020, she was named an Academic All-Canadian. On October 1, 2021, she scored her first goal in a 1–1 draw against the UBC Okanagan Heat. In 2021 and 2022, she was named the team's MVP. In 2022, she was named the UNBC Female Athlete of the Year, and became the first-ever UNBC player to be named a Canada West First Team All-Star.

== Club career ==
In 2019, Swift played with Vancouver Island FC in the Women's Premier Soccer League.

In 2022, Swift played with Victoria Highlanders FC in League1 British Columbia.

== International career ==
In July 2022, Swift joined the Tonga women's national football team for the 2022 OFC Women's Nations Cup (she had been set to join them a couple years earlier, however the COVID-19 pandemic prevented it). On 16 July 2022, she scored in a 1–1 draw against the Cook Islands.

=== International goals ===
No.	Date	Venue	Opponent	Score	Result	Competition
1.	16 July 2022	ANZ Stadium, Suva, Fiji	Cook Islands	1–1	1–1	2022 OFC Women's Nations Cup
2.	1 December 2023	SIFF Academy Fields 1 & 2, Honiara, Solomon Islands	Tahiti	2–0	2–0	2023 Pacific Games
