= 2027 FC Dallas season =

FC Dallas
2027 season
- Owner: Clark and Dan Hunt
- Head coach: Eric Quill
- Stadium: Toyota Stadium
Primary colors	Alternate colors

The 2027 FC Dallas season, also known as the sprint season, is the Major League Soccer club's 32nd season and third under head coach Eric Quill. The 2027 Sprint Season will occur from February to May 2027 in order to make the adjustment to the summer-to-spring calendar beginning in July 2027, aligning with the world’s top soccer leagues.

Due to renovations at Toyota Stadium, home match capacity is reduced to around 11,000.

== Competitions ==
=== MLS ===
==== Results by round ====
Round	1	2	3	4	5	6	7	8	9	10	11	12	13	14
Ground	A	H	H	A	H	A	H	A	H	A	A	H	H	A
Result														

Updated to match(es) played on October 29, 2026. Source: Regular Season
A = Away; H = Home; W = Win; D = Draw; L = Loss; P = Postponed

==== Regular season ====
Kickoff times are in CDT (UTC-05) unless shown otherwise

February 20 1 Copa Tejas	Austin FC	v	FC Dallas	Austin, Texas
7:00PM CDT (UTC-06)				Stadium: Q2 Stadium

February 27 2	FC Dallas	v	Portland Timbers	Frisco, Texas
7:00PM CST (UTC-06)				Stadium: Toyota Stadium

March 3 2	FC Dallas	v	LA Galaxy	Frisco, Texas
7:00PM CST (UTC-06)				Stadium: Toyota Stadium

March 6 4	San Diego FC	v	FC Dallas	San Diego, California
9:00PM CDT (UTC-05)				Stadium: Snapdragon Stadium

March 13 5	FC Dallas	v	Colorado Rapids	Frisco, Texas
7:00PM CDT (UTC-05)				Stadium: Toyota Stadium

March 20 6	Real Salt Lake	v	FC Dallas	Sandy, Utah
8:00PM CDT (UTC-05)				Stadium: America First Field

March 27 7	FC Dallas	v	Vancouver Whitecaps FC	Frisco, Texas
7:00PM CDT (UTC-05)				Stadium: Toyota Stadium

April 3 8	Los Angeles FC	v	FC Dallas	Los Angeles, California
9:00PM CDT (UTC-05)				Stadium: BMO Stadium

April 10 9	FC Dallas	v	San Jose Earthquakes	Frisco, Texas
7:00PM CDT (UTC-05)				Stadium: Toyota Stadium

April 17 10	Seattle Sounders FC	v	FC Dallas	Seattle, Washington
7:00PM CDT (UTC-05)				Stadium: Lumen Field

April 21 11	Sporting Kansas City	v	FC Dallas	Kansas City, Kansas
7:00PM CDT (UTC-05)				Stadium: Sporting Park

April 24 12 Texas Derby	FC Dallas	v	Houston Dynamo FC	Frisco, Texas
7:00PM CDT (UTC-05)				Stadium: Toyota Stadium

May 1 13	FC Dallas	v	St. Louis City SC	Frisco, Texas
7:00PM CDT (UTC-05)				Stadium: Toyota Stadium

May 8 14	Minnesota United FC	v	FC Dallas	Saint Paul, Minnesota
7:00PM CDT (UTC-05)				Stadium: Allianz Field
