= Daniel Zadravec =

Canadian soccer player (born 2000)

Personal information
- Date of birth: June 7, 2000 (age 26)
- Place of birth: Victoria, British Columbia, Canada
- Height: 6 ft 2 in (1.88 m)
- Position: Goalkeeper

Team information
- Current team: Pacific FC
- Number: 31

Youth career
- Vancouver Island Wave

College career
Years	Team	Apps	(Gls)
2018–2023	UNBC Timberwolves	48	(0)

Senior career*
Years	Team	Apps	(Gls)
2022–2023	Victoria Highlanders	13+	(0)
2024–2025	Pacific FC	3	(0)
- * Club domestic league appearances and goals as of June 27, 2024

Daniel Zadravec (born June 7, 2000) is a Canadian soccer player.

== Early life ==
He played with the Vancouver Island Wave from U13 level through U18. In his youth, he was a three-time winner of the Reynolds Centre for Soccer Excellence dedication award.

== University career ==
In 2018, Zadravec began attending the University of Northern British Columbia, where he played for the men's soccer team. In October 2022, he was named the Canada West Conference Player of the Week, as well as the U Sports Player of the Week. At the end of the 2022 season, he was named a Canada West Second Team All-Star. At the end of the 2023 season, he was named UNBC's Best Defensive Player and the Team MVP. He was also named an Academic All-Canadian five times.

== Club career ==
In 2022, he joined the Victoria Highlanders in League1 British Columbia. He had previously played with the Highlanders' second team in 2019 in the Pacific Coast Soccer League, where he was named a PCSL Second Team All-Star.

In June 2024, he signed a short-term replacement player contract with Pacific FC of the Canadian Premier League, who had both of their goalkeepers unavailable. He had been training with the club throughout the season. He made his professional debut on June 14, starting in a 3–2 victory over Valour FC. He returned to Pacific to begin the 2025 season, on a short-term replacement contract, following an injury to Sean Melvin. Later that season in September, he joined the club again for the remainder, following Max Anchor being recalled from his loan.

== Career statistics ==
As of match played June 27, 2024

Appearances and goals by club, season and competition
Club	Season	League			Playoffs		National cup		Other		Total	
Club	Season	Division	Apps	Goals	Apps	Goals	Apps	Goals	Apps	Goals	Apps	Goals
Victoria Highlanders	2023	League1 British Columbia	13	0	2	0	—		—		15	0
Pacific FC	2024	Canadian Premier League	3	0	0	0	0	0	—		3	0
Career total			16	0	2	0	0	0	0	0	18	0
