= Thomas Ryan (soccer) =

American soccer player

Personal information
- Full name: Thomas Ryan
- Date of birth: April 23, 1987 (age 39)
- Place of birth: Salem, Oregon, United States
- Height: 6 ft 1 in (1.85 m)
- Position: Defender

Youth career
- 2005–2006: Linfield Wildcats
- 2007–2008: Azusa Pacific Cougars

Senior career*
Years	Team	Apps	(Gls)
2005–2006	Cascade Surge	11	(0)
2009	Portland Timbers U23s	7	(0)
2010	Real Maryland Monarchs	1	(0)
- * Club domestic league appearances and goals as of June 29, 2012

Thomas Ryan (born April 23, 1987, in Salem, Oregon) is an American soccer player.

== Career ==
=== Youth and college ===
Ryan played two years of college soccer at Linfield College in his native Oregon, before transferring to Azusa Pacific University as a junior in 2007, the same year Azusa Pacific University won the NAIA National Championship.

=== Professional ===
Undrafted out of college, Ryan entered preseason with the Portland Timbers of the USL First Division and later signed with the Portland Timbers U23s in the USL Premier Development League in 2009, featuring in seven games. He signed his first professional contract in 2010 when he signed to play for the Real Maryland Monarchs in the USL Second Division. He made his professional debut on August 7, 2010, in a 2-2- tie with the Charlotte Eagles.

Thomas is currently retired from soccer and owns Tommy Blades Creative, LLC.; Photography and apparel company based out of the Pacific Northwest.
