= Logan Emory =

American soccer player

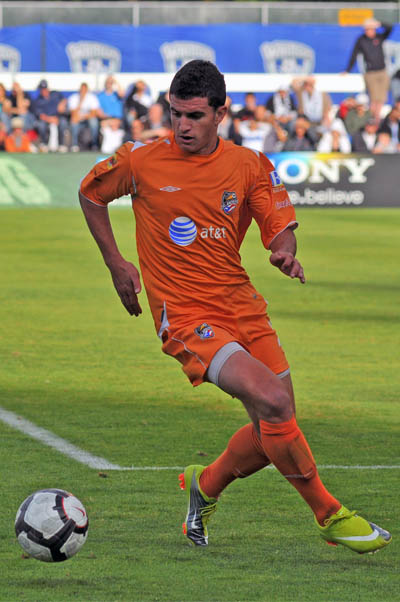

Personal information
- Full name: Logan Emory
- Date of birth: January 10, 1988 (age 38)
- Place of birth: Boise, Idaho, United States
- Height: 6 ft 1 in (1.85 m)
- Position: Defender

Youth career
- 2006–2009: Portland Pilots

Senior career*
Years	Team	Apps	(Gls)
2008	Spokane Spiders	6	(0)
2009	Portland Timbers U23s	12	(1)
2010–2011	Puerto Rico Islanders	51	(0)
2012–2013	Toronto FC	26	(0)
2013	San Antonio Scorpions	3	(0)
2014	LA Galaxy II	16	(0)
- * Club domestic league appearances and goals as of September 15, 2016

Logan Emory (born January 10, 1988) is an American soccer player who last played for LA Galaxy II in the USL Pro. He is currently an assistant coach at the University of Portland.

== Career ==
=== Youth and amateur ===
Emory attended Centennial High School, was named the Idaho Men's Gatorade Player of the Year in 2005, played club soccer for the Boise Nationals, and was part of his region's Olympic Development Program, before going on to play college soccer at the University of Portland. With the Pilots he was named to the All-West Coast Conference Freshman Team in 2006, and was an All-WCC Honorable Mention as a junior and a senior in 2008 and 2009.

During his college years Emory also played for the Spokane Spiders and Portland Timbers U23s in the USL Premier Development League.

=== Professional ===
Emory turned professional in 2010 when he signed with the Puerto Rico Islanders of the USSF Division 2 Professional League.

He made his professional debut on April 16, 2010, in a 2010 CFU Club Championship game against Haitian side Racing des Gonaïves, and made his league debut on April 21, 2010, in a game against NSC Minnesota Stars.

Emory signed with Toronto FC on March 13, 2012. He made his MLS debut against the Seattle Sounders FC on March 17, 2012. He was waived by Toronto FC on June 27, 2013.

== Honors ==
Puerto Rico Islanders

- USSF Division 2 Pro League: 2010
- CFU Club Championship: 2010
- CFU Club Championship:2011
- North American Soccer League: Semi-finalists 2011

Toronto FC

- Canadian Championship: 2012
