= Manny Gómez =

Canadian soccer player

Personal information
- Full name: Emmanuel Leonardo Gómez
- Date of birth: March 30, 1987 (age 39)
- Place of birth: Mendoza, Argentina
- Height: 5 ft 9 in (1.75 m)
- Position: Midfielder

Youth career
- 1999–2004: Victoria Football Academy
- 2005–2007: River Plate

Senior career*
Years	Team	Apps	(Gls)
2007	CSD Tristán Suárez	27	(7)
2008–2010	Sportivo Barracas	50	(19)
2011	CD Binéfar		
2012	Victoria Highlanders		
2013	Club Atletico Jorge Griffa		
2014	Victoria Highlanders		

International career
2003	Canada U15	23	(3)
2006	Canada U20	1	(1)
2013	Canada	0	(0)
- * Club domestic league appearances and goals

Emmanuel Leonardo Gómez (born March 30, 1987) is a Canadian former professional soccer player who played for Club Atlético Jorge Griffa.

== Early life ==
Gómez was just two years old when he and his family moved to Victoria, British Columbia. Both of his parents were born in Mendoza, Argentina.

== Career ==
Gómez began his career in his hometown with the Victoria Football Academy and was 2005 scouted from Argentine top club Club Atlético River Plate. After three years with Club Atlético River Plate on their youth side, he signed his first professional contract with Club Social y Deportivo Tristán Suárez. Gómez played in his first professional season for CSD Tristán Suárez in the Argentine Primera B Metropolitana, playing twenty-seven games and scoring seven goals. In January 2008 he joined Sportivo Barracas in the Primera C Metropolitana league. After two years with Sportivo Barracas, joined 2011 to Spanish lower side CD Binéfar. After one year in Spain returned to Argentine and signed for CA Griffa.

== International career ==
Gómez is former Canada men's national youth soccer teams player who played two games for the U-15 and one game for the U-20 of Canada. On 18. January 2013 earned his first call-up for the Canadian national men's soccer team but failed to make an appearance.
