= Sahil Sandhu =

Canadian soccer player (born 1991)

Personal information
- Date of birth: 5 January 1991 (age 35)
- Place of birth: Amritsar, Punjab, India
- Height: 1.80 m (5 ft 11 in)
- Position: Defender

Youth career
- Vancouver Whitecaps FC Residency
- 2009: Energie Cottbus
- Douglas College Royals

Senior career*
Years	Team	Apps	(Gls)
2009	Vancouver Whitecaps FC U-23	11	(1)
2013	Victoria Highlanders	6	(1)
2014	ICST Pegasus		(12)
2015–2016	Whitecaps FC 2	36	(0)
- * Club domestic league appearances and goals as of 01:55, 22 September 2016 (UTC)

Sahil Sandhu (born 5 January 1991) is an Indian former professional footballer who played as a defender.

== Club career ==
=== Early career ===
Born in Amritsar, Punjab in India, Sandhu started his career with the Vancouver Whitecaps FC Residency program after moving to Canada as a child. He was a part of the 2004 Whitecaps FC Residency team that won the Super Y-League. He scored the winning goal in the championship final against Schulz Academy. A couple years later, in 2007, Sandhu was awarded the B.C. Soccer Association Male Youth Player of the Year in 2007. In 2009, Sandhu was loaned out to the youth academy at Energie Cottbus. After spending time with Energie Cottbus, Sandhu played in the USL PDL with the Victoria Highlanders.

Sandhu eventually left the Whitecaps FC Residency and attended Douglas College where he went on to represent the Royals. While playing with the Royals, Sandhu also played for ICST Pegasus of the Vancouver Metro Soccer League where in 2014 he went to score twelve goals during the season.

=== Whitecaps 2 ===
On 25 March 2015, Sandhu returned to the Whitecaps FC organization when he signed for Whitecaps FC 2, the Vancouver Whitecaps FC reserve team in the United Soccer League. He made his debut for the team four days later on 29 March 2015 against the Seattle Sounders FC 2. He came on as a 46th-minute substitute for Victor Blasco. In December 2016, Whitecaps FC 2 announced that Sandhu would not return to the club for the 2017 season.

== International career ==
Sandhu has represented Canada at the under-15 and under-17 levels.

== Career statistics ==
As of 26 May 2016

Club	Season	League			League Cup		Domestic Cup		International		Total	
Club	Season	Division	Apps	Goals	Apps	Goals	Apps	Goals	Apps	Goals	Apps	Goals
Whitecaps FC 2	2015	USL	25	0	—	—	—	—	—	—	25	0
Whitecaps FC 2	2016	USL	3	0	—	—	—	—	—	—	3	0
Career total			28	0	0	0	0	0	0	0	28	0
