= Yondr =

American company

Yondr, Inc.
- Founded: 2014; 12 years ago
- Founders: Graham Dugoni
- Headquarters: Los Angeles, California, United States
- Products: Yondr Pouch
- Website: www.overyondr.com

Yondr, Inc. is an American company whose main product is the Yondr Pouch, which aids in creating phone-free environments. Its magnetic pouch allows individuals to keep their phones with them while preventing use in designated phone-free spaces, such as schools, courthouses, and live event venues.

Founded in 2014 by Graham Dugoni, it has expanded its services to 27 countries, with offices in London and Dublin. Its pouches are intended to reduce distractions and prevent unauthorized photography or recordings.

== Background ==
The concept for Yondr began in 2012 with founder and former professional soccer player, Graham Dugoni after he attended the Treasure Island Music Festival and witnessed an intoxicated festival goer dancing and people recording. Dugoni leaned on his interest in sociology, phenomenology, and the philosophy of technology and began experimenting with several options for the design of the Yondr pouch.

== Technology ==
The pouches use magnetic locks similar to those used with hard electronic article surveillance tags, with phones being placed in the pouch upon entry to the phone-free space. The owner retains possession of the phone inside the pouch, and upon departing, the pouch can be unlocked and the phone removed by tapping it on an unlocking base.

Yondr pouches do not block cell signals or the internet. Staff members typically ask phone owners to turn off their devices or switch them to airplane mode before locking them inside the pouch. Someone expecting an important message can see their screen light up through the pouch, and medical exemptions can be accommodated with easier-to-open designs using Velcro or special wristbands.

== Bypasses ==
There are several ways for students to bypass the pouch, including telling school officials they don't have a mobile phone, or placing decoys such as burner phones or calculators in a pouch, while pocketing the real device for surreptitious use. It's also possible to break into a sealed pouch: via a magnet, by brute force, or by using a pencil to pop the seal open.

== See also ==
- Mobile phone jammer
- Secret photography
