= Victoria Highlanders FC =

- Full name: Victoria Highlanders Football Club
- Nickname: The Highlanders
- Founded: 2008; 18 years ago
- Stadium: Centennial Stadium; Victoria, British Columbia
- Capacity: 5,000
- Chairman: Marvin Diercks
- 2023: L1BC, 1st Playoffs, Finalists
- Website: http://highlandersfc.ca/

Victoria Highlanders FC is a Canadian soccer team based in Victoria, British Columbia, Canada. The club was founded in 2008.

The team had played in the American USL League Two from 2009 to 2019 (except 2015) and in League1 British Columbia from 2022 to 2023. The team's colours are white, black, and gold.

== History ==
Highlanders logo 2009–2017

The Highlanders were founded in 2008 when the United Soccer League awarded the city of Victoria, British Columbia the rights to a semi-professional Premier Development League franchise. One of the major contributing factors was the successful 2007 FIFA U-20 World Cup, of which Victoria was a host city, which led local businessman Alex Campbell Jr. to create the Highlanders. The initial goal of the club was to eventually move to the fully professional USL First Division. Their initial home field was the Bear Mountain Stadium in Langford, British Columbia, achieving great attendance in their inaugural season.

The team debuted in the 2009 season, after spending a year assembling a coaching staff under head coach Colin Miller and recruiting a roster. They played their first match on May 1, 2009 against the Spokane Spiders, winning by a score of 1–0, with the first goal in franchise history being scored by Patrick Gawrys. They finished their inaugural season placing 5th in the Northwest Division with a 6–4–6 record. Over the course of their inaugural season, they averaged crowds of 1,734, including a crowd of 2,412 for their home opener. After the season, head coach Colin Miller announced his resignation to be closer to his family in Abbotsford. The club also announced an affiliation with USL First Division club Austin Aztex in a farm club role, for player development as well as exhibition matches. Ian Bridge was named Miller's replacement for the 2010 season.

In 2011, they qualified for the playoffs for the first time after placing second in their division, but lost to the Fresno Fuego in the first round by a score of 3–1. In 2012, the Juan de Fuca Plate, which was awarded to the best British Columbia PDL team based on matches between the clubs (originally the Highlanders, Vancouver Whitecaps FC U-23, and Fraser Valley Mariners and later TSS FC Rovers). The Highlanders finished as runners-up for the original title, finishing second to the Whitecaps due to a tiebreaker.

In 2013, they won their first Northwest Division title, as well as the Western Conference Championship. In the playoffs, they defeated Ventura County Fusion and Portland Timbers U23s in the first two rounds, before being defeated by the Thunder Bay Chill in the semi-finals. In 2014, the club played exhibition matches with Scottish club Rangers F.C. and NASL club FC Edmonton. They finished second in their division in 2014, but lost in the play-in round of the playoffs 7-2 to the Vancouver Whitecaps FC U-23, but they did capture their first Juan de Fuca plate title after defeating the Whitecaps U23 in both regular season matches.

In January 2015, team owner Alex Campbell Jr. folded the team due to not finding financial partners amid mounting financial losses, as the club had never posted a profit since 2009. However, on April 1, Marvin Diercks and Dave Dew, long time Victoria soccer advocates, purchased the franchise and branding rights to the Highlanders from previous owner Alex Campbell reviving the team and announcing that they would join the Pacific Coast Soccer League for the 2015 season. After a good run in the regular season, the Highlanders finished third overall and clinched a berth into the Sheila Anderson Memorial Challenge Cup play-offs. In the playoffs, the Highlanders advanced to the finals, where they lost in a penalty kick shootout to Khalsa Sporting Club.

After a successful season in the PCSL, the club started making plans to return to the USL PDL. During the USL Winter meetings in December 2015, Diercks and Dew purchased the PDL franchise rights from the Puget Sound Gunners FC and rejoined the PDL on January 29, 2016. Also in 2016, the Highlanders forged a partnership with English club Sheffield Wednesday.

In 2018, the Highlanders ownership group expanded to include Brett Large, Moreno Stefani, Grant Olson, Mark deFrias, and Ryan Wilson, in addition to Diercks and Dew. The club also revamped their logo at the time.

In December 2019, the Highlanders announced they would return to the PCSL, as they awaited the formation of League1 British Columbia for 2021. They joined the Vancouver Island Soccer League for the 2020-21 winter season, after the 2020 PCSL season was cancelled due to the COVID-19 pandemic.

In 2021, it was announced that the Highlanders would be joining the new League1 British Columbia in both the men's and women's division, with the men's Highlanders organization merging with the women's club Vancouver Island FC, which played in the Women's Premier Soccer League. Their debut match in the league occurred on May 23 with the women's match against the Whitecaps FC Academy, serving as the first ever match for the league.

In 2023, they won the League1 BC regular season title, qualifying the team for the 2024 Canadian Championship, before being defeated by the Whitecaps FC Academy in the playoff final. In April 2024, the club withdrew from the league due to rising costs, in addition withdrawing their spot in the 2024 Canadian Championship, but would continue to operate a team in the Vancouver Island Soccer League.

== Club culture ==
With the purchase of season tickets, one also gets a membership in the Victoria Highlanders Supporters Board that administers the fan's 30% ownership in the club. The Supporters Board is a democratic registered non-profit society with limited liability, and all money or other assets belonging to the Supporters Board belong to all members equally. The structure is to facilitate a formalized way to provide feedback, voice opinions, help guide the club's direction, and expand the club's membership base. Day-to-day club operations are handled by senior club management.

The Highlanders are cheered on by members of the supporters group Lake Side Buoys (LSB). The Highlanders' mascot is a Scottish sheep dog or highland terrier named Striker, who wears the highland dress.

== Stadiums ==
- Bear Mountain Stadium; Langford, British Columbia (2009–2011)
- Royal Athletic Park; Victoria, British Columbia (2011–2015)
- Centennial Stadium; Victoria, British Columbia (2016–present)

The Highlanders when first announced were to begin playing in a 4500-seat stadium at the Juan de Fuca Recreation Centre, however, after this project did not proceed the city of Langford, British Columbia built its own stadium, Bear Mountain Stadium, which the Highlanders committed to using. Capacity concerns regarding dressing rooms, field space, mid-field seating capacity, and training time conflicts for the four Highlander teams with the Victoria Rebels Football Club of the Canadian Junior Football League and other tenants resulted in the move to Royal Athletic Park in Victoria in the middle of the 2011 season. At the Royal Athletic Park, the team was a secondary tenant to the Victoria HarbourCats baseball team, consequently having their home matches scheduled around those. In 2016, they moved to Centennial Stadium in Victoria.

== Seasons ==
Year	Level	League	Record	Regular season	Playoffs	Juan de Fuca Plate	Canadian Championship	Ref
2009	4	PDL	6–4–6	5th, Northwest	did not qualify	no competition	ineligible	
2010	4	PDL	7–3–6	4th, Northwest	did not qualify	no competition	ineligible	
2011	4	PDL	9–3–4	2nd, Northwest	Round of 16	no competition	ineligible	
2012	4	PDL	6–4–6	6th, Northwest	did not qualify	Runner-Up	ineligible	
2013	4	PDL	8–4–2	1st, Northwest	Semi-finals	Runner-Up	ineligible	
2014	4	PDL	8–3–3	2nd, Northwest	Play-in Round	Winner	ineligible	
2015	–	PCSL	8–7–1	3rd	Runner-Up	no competition	ineligible	
2016	4	PDL	3–6–5	5th, Northwest	did not qualify	no competition	ineligible	
2017	4	PDL	5–1–8	4th, Northwest	did not qualify	Winner	ineligible	
2018	4	PDL	5–0–9	5th, Northwest	did not qualify	Runner-Up	ineligible	
2019	4	USL League Two	6–1–7	4th, Northwest	did not qualify	Runner-Up	ineligible	
2020–21	–	Vancouver Island Soccer League	6–0–1	2nd (Note: The 2020–21 season was cancelled before its conclusion due to the COVID-19 pandemic)	Season cancelled	no competition	ineligible	
2021–22	–	Vancouver Island Soccer League	11–4–5	4th	TBD	no competition	ineligible	
2022	3	League1 British Columbia	3–2–7	7th	did not qualify	5th (Note: The Juan de Fuca Plate became a combined men's and women's competition in 2022)	ineligible	
2023	3	League1 British Columbia	10–2–2	1st	Runner-Up	4th	did not qualify	

== Notable former players ==
This list of notable former and current players who went on to play professional soccer after playing for the team in the Premier Development League or League1 British Columbia, or those who previously played professionally before joining the team.

- (England) Cory Bent
- (Canada) Caleb Clarke
- (United States) Jamie Cunningham
- (Canada) Jamar Dixon
- (Canada) Manny Gómez
- (Canada) A. J. Gray
- (Canada) Josh Heard
- (Canada) Jordan Hughes
- (Canada) Tyler Hughes
- (Canada) Diaz Kambere
- (Canada) Brett Levis
- (Northern Ireland) Ryan McCurdy
- (Canada) Callum Montgomery
- (Canada) Riley O'Neill
- (United States) Matt Polster
- (Canada) Jake Ruby
- (Canada) Sahil Sandhu
- (Germany) Peter Schaale
- (Scotland) Blair Sturrock
- (Canada) Nolan Wirth
- (Canada) Sean Young
- (Canada) Daniel Zadravec

== Coaching history ==
- (Canada) Colin Miller (2009)
- (Canada) Ian Bridge (2010–2012)
- (Canada) Steve Simonson (2012–2015)
- (Canada) Dave Dew (2016–2017)
- (Germany) Thomas Niendorf (2018–?)
- (Canada) Steve Simonson (?–present)

== Reserves ==
The Highlanders also established reserve teams. In 2009, their U20 reserves only played exhibition matches, before joining the Men's Premier Division of the Pacific Coast Soccer League in 2010. In March 2011, the Highlanders announced an affiliation with a Nanaimo-Ladysmith based group to be named the Mid-Isle Highlanders. The Mid-Isle Highlanders play in the Pacific Coast Soccer League (PCSL) Reserves Division (a U-21 division) as a development squad. The Mid Isle side was older than the Highlanders U20 Reserves (who were U-17 and U-18) playing in the PCSL Premier Division, but younger than the U-23 PDL roster. They also have younger youth teams as part of their Victoria Highlanders Futures program.

== Women ==
In 2010, the Highlanders added a women's team, when they adopted the Victoria Stars FC of the PCSL, who ran into financial difficulties and renamed them as the Victoria Highlanders Women. In 2011, the team joined the USL W-League. After two seasons, the team returned to the PCSL for 2013, with the team rebranding as the Peninsula Co-op Women's Soccer after their major sponsor, although the Highlanders continued to be the operators of the team despite the name rebrand. The women's team folded after the 2014 season and was not part of the 2015 revival with the new ownership group.

In 2021, it was announced that the Highlanders would be joining the new League1 British Columbia in both the men's and women's division, with the men's Highlanders organization merging with the women's club Vancouver Island FC, which played in the Women's Premier Soccer League.
