= Houston Leones =

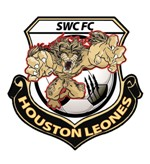
- Full name: Houston Leones
- Nickname: Leones
- Founded: 2007
- Dissolved: 2010
- Ground: Soccer World Center; Richmond, Texas
- Capacity: 4,500
- Owner: (Mexico) Juan Carlos Hernández
- Head Coach: (Mexico) Cuauhtemoc Rios
- League: USL Premier Development League
- 2010: 2nd, Mid South; Playoffs: Conference Finals
| Home colors | Away colors |

The Houston Leones were an American soccer team based in Houston, Texas, United States. Founded in 2007, the team played in the USL Premier Development League (PDL), the fourth tier of the American Soccer Pyramid, in the Mid South Division of the Southern Conference. The franchise folded at the end of the 2010 season and left the league thereafter.

The team played its home games at the soccer-specific Soccer World Center in nearby Richmond, Texas. The team's colors were blue and white.

The Leones were an official minor league affiliate of Mexican Premier League team Cruz Azul.

== History ==
The Leones' first season in competition began on a hugely positive note, with a 3–0 opening day victory at home to the New Orleans Shell Shockers in front of 500 fans, and with a squad featuring several junior players from Mexican side Cruz Azul, who were spending time with their new Texan affiliate for match experience; unfortunately, this was something of a false dawn as the men from Richmond lost their next three games on the trot, conceding five goals with no reply. Two more victories in late May, 3–0 over Mississippi Brilla and 2–1 over El Paso Patriots looked to have righted the ship, but this proved to be the last hurrah, as they failed to win another game all season. As June turned into July, the Leones' on-field performances got progressively worse and worse: they lost four close games on the bounce and then, as some of players returned to the Cruz Azul junior team for the beginning of the 2008/09 Mexican Clausura, the second string defence absolutely fell apart.

== Players ==
=== Notable former players ===
This list of notable former players comprises players who went on to play professional soccer after playing for the team in the Premier Development League, or those who previously played professionally before joining the team.

- (United States) Eric Quill

== Year-by-year ==
| Year | Division | League | Regular season | Playoffs | Open Cup |
|---|---|---|---|---|---|
| 2008 | 4 | USL PDL | 8th, Mid South | Did not qualify | Did not qualify |
| 2009 | 4 | USL PDL | 7th, Mid South | Did not qualify | Did not qualify |
| 2010 | 4 | USL PDL | 2nd, Mid South | Conference Finals | Did not qualify |

== Head coaches ==
- (Mexico) Carlos Ayala (2008)
- (Mexico) Rafael Lopez (2009)
- (Mexico) Rogelio Martinez (2009)
- (Mexico) Cuauhtemoc Rios (2010)

== Stadia ==
- Soccer World Center, Richmond, Texas (2008–2010)

The Soccer World Center is a 17-acre (69,000 m^{2}) soccer-specific facility which comprises three fields (including a 4,500-seat stadium field that is expandable to 8,000–10,000), and was built by team owner Juan Carlos Hernández.

== Average attendance ==
Attendance stats are calculated by averaging each team's self-reported home attendances from the historical match archive at https://web.archive.org/web/20100105175057/http://www.uslsoccer.com/history/index_E.html.

- 2008: 294
- 2009: 166
- 2010: 112
