= Tyler Hughes (soccer) =

Canadian soccer player (born 1980)

Personal information
- Full name: Tyler John Hughes
- Date of birth: November 5, 1980 (age 45)
- Place of birth: Victoria, British Columbia, Canada
- Height: 6 ft 0 in (1.83 m)
- Position: Defender

College career
Years	Team	Apps	(Gls)
1998–2001	Coastal Carolina Chanticleers		

Senior career*
Years	Team	Apps	(Gls)
2002	Wilmington Hammerheads	19	(1)
2003–2004	Toronto Lynx	47	(0)
2005–2009	Östers IF	85	(2)
2010	Victoria Highlanders	58	(3)

International career
2010	Canada beach soccer	3	(1)
- * Club domestic league appearances and goals as of November 08, 2014

Tyler Hughes (born November 5, 1980) is a Canadian former soccer player who played for Victoria Highlanders in the USL Premier Development League.

== Career ==
=== College ===
Hughes had a standout career at Coastal Carolina University that saw him earn four All-Conference and two All-South selections.

=== Professional ===
Hughes made his professional debut with the Wilmington Hammerheads of the USL Second Division in 2002. In 2003, he signed for the Toronto Lynx, where he earn a starting position and finished sixth on the club in minutes played in his debut season. He played for the Lynx again in 2004 playing 22 games but failed to reach the playoffs for the second straight year.

In 2005 Hughes was signed by Swedish side Östers IF, and in his first season he played ten games. In 2006 he played six games and scored two goals.

After his release from Östers IF Hughes returned to Canada; after playing in amateur leagues in his native British Columbia for a couple of years, he trialled with USSF Division 2 Pro League side Austin Aztex, before signing with the Victoria Highlanders of the USL Premier Development League in 2010.
