= Eric Quill =

American soccer player and coach

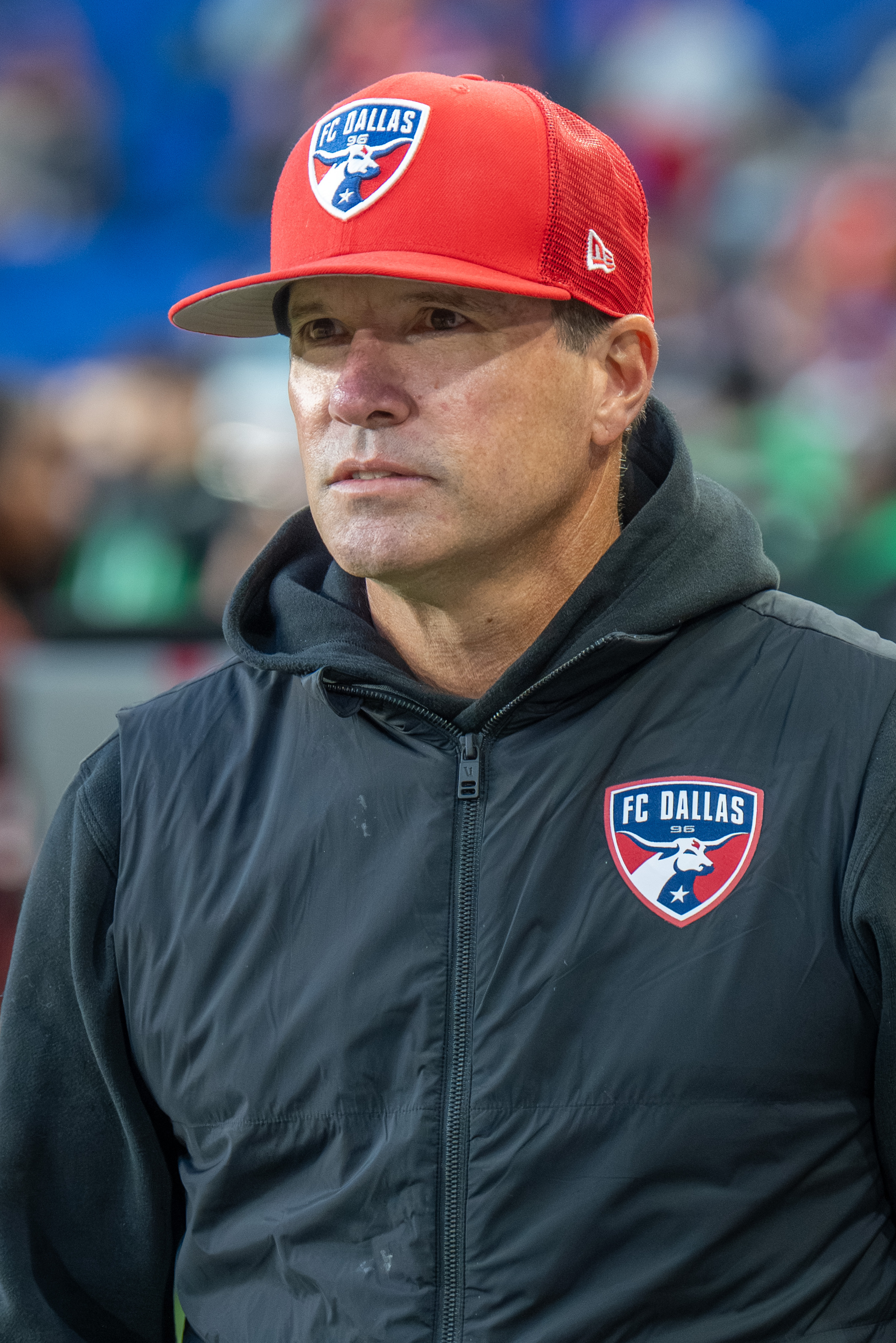
- Quill with FC Dallas in 2026

Personal information
- Full name: Eric Quill
- Date of birth: February 28, 1978 (age 48)
- Place of birth: Missouri City, Texas, U.S.
- Height: 6 ft 0 in (1.83 m)
- Position: Midfielder

College career
Years	Team	Apps	(Gls)
1996	Clemson Tigers		

Senior career*
Years	Team	Apps	(Gls)
1997–2001	Tampa Bay Mutiny	75	(8)
1997	→ Jacksonville Cyclones (loan)	6	(1)
1998	→ MLS Pro-40 (loan)	21	(6)
1999	→ MLS Pro-40 (loan)	10	(4)
2002–2003	Kansas City Wizards	43	(3)
2004	Dallas Burn	23	(1)
2005	MetroStars	2	(0)
2009	Houston Leones	1	(0)

Managerial career
- 2007–2008: Houston Cougars women (assistant)
- 2019–2021: North Texas SC
- 2022–2023: Columbus Crew (assistant)
- 2023–2024: New Mexico United
- 2024–: FC Dallas
- * Club domestic league appearances and goals as of 20 November 2024

Eric Quill (born February 28, 1978) is an American soccer coach and former player. He is currently the head coach at Major League Soccer side FC Dallas.

== Career ==
=== College ===
An outstanding youth soccer player, Quill was offered a contract by Ajax Amsterdam as a teenager, but declined the opportunity to go to Europe. He instead stayed in the United States, following the conventional route by going to Clemson University to play college soccer in 1996. After scoring six goals and five assists as a freshman for the Tigers, however, Quill decided to go pro, signing a Project-40 contract with MLS.

=== Professional ===
Quill was allocated to the Tampa Bay Mutiny for the 1997 season, but saw little playing time. After appearing extensively as a substitute in 1999, Quill finally broke into the team's starting lineup in 2000, when he started 25 games, registering five goals and eleven assists. Quill returned and played just as well in 2001, finishing the year with two goals and eight assists in 23 starts. The Mutiny were contracted at the end of 2001, however, and Quill was selected fourth overall by the Kansas City Wizards in the 2002 MLS Dispersal Draft.

Quill immediately stepped into the Wizards' left midfield position, but numerous injuries limited him to 13 starts and one assist on the season. Having recovered in 2003, Quill had a solid campaign, starting 25 games and scoring three goals and seven assists. However, Quill was traded in the offseason to the Dallas Burn along with Carey Talley for Shavar Thomas. Quill had a disappointing season with the Burn, and although he beat out Brad Davis for his left midfield position, he only registered one goal and three assists on the year. He was let go by the club early in 2005 and signed with the MetroStars in August. Quill was released by the club in November 2005.

Unable to find a club, Quill turned to coaching, spending time as the assistant coach and recruiting coordinator with the women's soccer team at the University of Houston in 2007 and 2008.

In early 2009, Quill was coaxed out of semi-retirement to play in the Premier Development League for Houston Leones, where he was expected to lend his experience to the team's midfield.

=== International ===
Although he had been called up to camps, Quill never played for the United States national team. He did, however, play for the U-23, U-20, and U-16 sides.

=== Coaching ===
Quill's first head coaching position was for North Texas SC during the club's tenure in USL League One. North Texas won the league during the inaugural 2019 season, and Quill has named League One Coach of the Year.

In December 2021, Quill was named to Caleb Porter's Columbus Crew coaching staff.

Quill was appointed head coach of New Mexico United in the USL Championship on June 13, 2023. In August 2024, New Mexico United extended Quill's contract through the 2026 season. Quill led New Mexico to their best-ever single season performance in 2024, including a Western Conference title and team single-season records in wins and points.

Quill was named head coach of Major League Soccer club FC Dallas on November 20, 2024.

== Personal life ==
Quill is married to Susan Bush, former soccer player for the U.S. national team and current coach, who he worked with while the assistant of the Houston Cougars women's team.

== Coaching statistics ==
As of match played 21 November 2026

Coaching record by team and tenure
Team	Nat	From	To	Record							
Team	Nat	From	To	G	W	D	L	GF	GA	GD	Win %
North Texas SC	(United States)	January 24, 2019	December 12, 2021	74	35	21	18	122	84	+38	47.30
New Mexico United	(United States)	June 13, 2023	November 19, 2024	63	31	10	22	92	83	+9	49.21
FC Dallas	(United States)	November 20, 2024	Present	76	31	22	23	130	120	+10	40.79
Total				213	97	53	63	344	287	+57	45.54

== Honors ==
North Texas SC

- USL League One: 2019

Individual

- USL League One Coach of the Year: 2019
