= Jordan Hughes =

Canadian soccer player (born 1984)

Personal information
- Full name: Jordan Hughes
- Date of birth: April 23, 1984 (age 42)
- Place of birth: Victoria, British Columbia, Canada
- Height: 6 ft 2 in (1.88 m)
- Position: Forward

Team information
- Current team: Victoria Highlanders
- Number: 17

College career
Years	Team	Apps	(Gls)
2002–2005	Coastal Carolina Chanticleers		

Senior career*
Years	Team	Apps	(Gls)
2006–2008	Charleston Battery	36	(1)
2009–	Victoria Highlanders	68	(32)
- * Club domestic league appearances and goals as of July 9, 2013

Jordan Hughes (born April 23, 1984) is a Canadian soccer player who currently plays for Victoria Highlanders in the USL Premier Development League.

== Career ==
=== College ===
Hughes played college soccer with Coastal Carolina University, where he was a member of the Big South All Tournament Team. He scored 7 goals in the Big South Conference, allowing Coastal Carolina to win the Big South Championship Game, and was also named Big South Player of the Week twice his senior year.

Hughes also played with the British Columbia Provincial Team from 1998 to 2001.

=== Professional ===
In 2006 Charleston Battery selected Hughes in the first round pick in the USL Draft Pick, and signed a contract with the team. He made his Battery debut on July 4 against Miami FC. In his first season, he played ten games and recorded an assist. He helped Charleston make the playoffs reaching all the way to the semi-finals. He signed a new year deal with Charleston in 2007.

On December 7, 2008 Hughes was named as one of the "original six" players to play for the expansion Victoria Highlanders in the USL Premier Development League in 2009.
