= Capital FC =

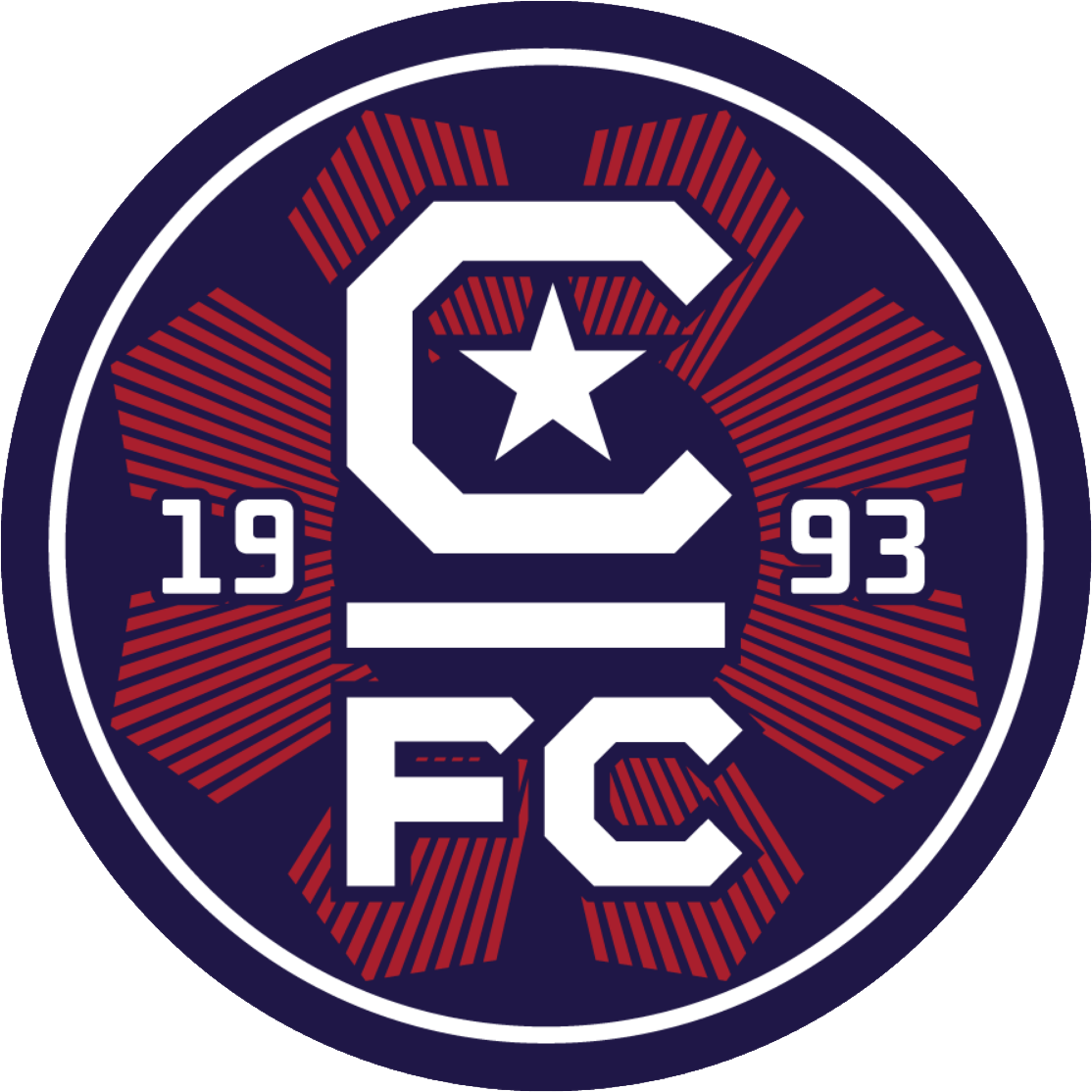
- Full name: Capital Futbol Club Atletico
- Nickname: CFC Atletico
- Founded: November 11, 2008 (as Portland Timbers U23s)
- Stadium: John Chambers Field at CFC Complex Salem, Oregon
- Capacity: 2,000
- President: Benje Orozco
- Head Coach: Matt Broadhead
- League: Men: USL League Two; Women: USL W League
- 2023: 4th, Northwest Division; Playoffs: DNQ
- Website: www.cfcsalem.com
Home colors	Away colors

Capital Futbol Club is an American soccer team based in Salem, Oregon, United States. Although founded in 2008 as part of the development system for the Portland Timbers USSF D2 organization, beginning in 2011 they were part of the development system for the Major League Soccer franchise of the same name until 2022. The team plays in USL League Two, the fourth tier of the American Soccer Pyramid. The men's team is known as Capital FC Atletico. The women's team, who plays in the USL W League, is known as Capital FC Atletica.

== History ==
The Timbers joined the PDL in 2009, and played their first ever game on May 9, 2009, against fellow expansion franchise Victoria Highlanders finishing 2–2, with the first goal in franchise history being scored by Jarad Van Schaik assisted by Matt Van Houten.

In 2017, the team announced it would be based out of Salem, in affiliation with Capital FC Timbers.

On April 1, 2022, Capital FC Timbers announced that they were severing all ties with the Portland Timbers and renamed the USL League Two team Capital FC Atletico.

== Players ==
=== Notable former players ===
This list of notable former players comprises players who went on to play professional soccer after playing for the team in the Premier Development League, or those who previously played professionally before joining the team.

- (United States) Fatai Alashe
- (United States) Freddie Braun
- (United States) Graham Dugoni
- (United States) Logan Emory
- (United States) Sterling Flunder
- (New Zealand) Jake Gleeson
- (United States) Miguel Guante
- (United States) Erik Hurtado
- (Zambia) Mutanda Kwesele
- (Australia) Daniel Leach
- (United States) Jason McLaughlin
- (United States) Andrew Ribeiro
- (United States) Brent Richards
- (United States) Thomas Ryan
- (Canada) Ross Smith
- (United States) Warren Ukah
- (United States) Jarad vanSchaik
- (United States) Collen Warner
- (Guyana) Emery Welshman
- (United States) Khiry Shelton
- (United States) Mark Sherrod
- (United States) Eric Miller
- (Uruguay) Nicolás Lugano

== Year-by-year ==
=== Men's Team ===
Year	Division	League	Regular season	Playoffs	Open Cup	Avg. attendance
Portland Timbers U23s
2009	4	USL PDL	2nd, Northwest	Divisional Semifinals	did not qualify	361
2010	4	USL PDL	1st, Northwest	Champions	did not qualify	616
2011	4	USL PDL	4th, Northwest	did not qualify	did not qualify	1,531
2012	4	USL PDL	2nd, Northwest	Conference Semifinals	First Round	3,003
2013	4	USL PDL	2nd, Northwest	Conference Final	Second Round	2,444
2014	4	USL PDL	4th, Northwest	did not qualify	Second Round	2,327
2015	4	USL PDL	2nd, Northwest	Divisional Playoffs	did not qualify	—
2016	4	USL PDL	7th, Northwest	did not qualify	First Round	—
2017	4	USL PDL	1st, Northwest	Conference Semifinals	did not qualify	—
2018	4	USL PDL	6th, Northwest	did not qualify	Second Round	—
2019	4	USL League Two	5th, Northwest	did not qualify	did not qualify	—
2020	4	USL League Two	Season cancelled due to COVID-19 pandemic			
2021	4	USL League Two	1st, Northwest	National Semifinals	Second Round	—
Capital FC Atletico
2022	4	USL League Two	1st, Northwest	Conference Quarterfinals	Second Round	—
2023	4	USL League Two	4th, Northwest	did not qualify	did not qualify	—

=== Women's team ===
As of July 21, 2024

Year	League	Regular season	Playoffs
Capital FC Atletica
2023	USL W League	5th, Northwest	did not qualify
2024	USL W League	4th, Northwest	did not qualify

== Honors ==
=== Portland Timbers U23 ===
- USL PDL Champions 2010
- USL PDL regular-season champions 2010
- USL PDL Western Conference champions 2010
- USL PDL Northwest Division champions 2010, 2017
- USL League Two Western Conference champions 2021
- USL League Two Northwest Division champions 2021

=== Capital FC ===
- USL League Two Northwest Division champions 2022

== Head coaches ==
- (United States) Matt Broadhead (2022–present)
- (United States) Aaron Lewis (2017–2021)
- (United States) Jim Rilatt (2009–2016)

== Stadiums ==
- John Chambers Field at CFC Complex; Salem, Oregon (2022–present)
- McCulloch Stadium; Salem, Oregon (2017–2021)
- Providence Park; Portland, Oregon (2009–2016)
- Tualatin Hills Park; Beaverton, Oregon one game (2009)
- Kiggins Bowl; Vancouver, Washington three games (2009–2011)
- Lincoln Park Stadium at Pacific University; Forest Grove, Oregon two games (2009)
- Stadium at Tigard High School; Tigard, Oregon two games (2009–2010)
- Hare Field; Hillsboro, Oregon two games (2010–2011)
- Stadium at Gresham High School; Gresham, Oregon one game (2010)
- Stadium at Clackamas High School; Clackamas, Oregon one game (2011)
- Stadium at Sherwood High School; Sherwood, Oregon one game (2011)
- Doc Harris Stadium at Camas High School; Camas, Washington one game (2011)
