= Dominic Reinold =

German footballer (born 1989)

Personal information
- Date of birth: 7 January 1989 (age 37)
- Place of birth: Wesseling, West Germany
- Height: 1.91 m (6 ft 3 in)
- Position: Forward

Youth career
- Hamburger SV
- 2007–2008: Bonner SC
- 2009–2010: Fairleigh Dickinson Knights

Senior career*
Years	Team	Apps	(Gls)
2010–2011	New Jersey Rangers	11	(6)
2011–2012	Beira-Mar	2	(0)
2011–2012	→ Covilhã (loan)	24	(2)
Total		37	(8)
- * Club domestic league appearances and goals

Dominic Reinold (born 7 January 1989) is a German former professional footballer who played as a forward.

== College and amateur career ==
Reinold moved to the United States to play college soccer at Fairleigh Dickinson University in 2009. In his freshman year, Reinold made 18 appearances and led his team with 12 goals and also recorded four assists for a total of 28 points. In his sophomore year, he finished with nine goals and four assists for a total of 22 points.

During his two years at Fairleigh Dickinson, Reinold was named to the First Team All-Northeast Conference in 2009 and 2010 and National Soccer Coaches Association of America Second Team All-North Atlantic Region in 2010. He was also named 2009 Northeast Conference Rookie of the Year.

Reinold also spent two seasons with the New Jersey Rangers in the USL Premier Development League.

== Professional ==
On 21 July 2011, after a successful trial, Reinold signed a two-year contract with Beira-Mar, forgoing his final two years of eligibility with Fairleigh Dickinson. He made his professional debut on 14 August, coming on as a sub for Zhang Chengdong in a 0–0 draw against Marítimo.
