= Graham Dugoni =

American soccer player

Personal information
- Full name: Graham Andrew Dugoni
- Date of birth: November 24, 1986 (age 39)
- Place of birth: Portland, Oregon, United States
- Height: 6 ft 2 in (1.88 m)
- Position: Defender

Youth career
- 2005–2008: Duke Blue Devils

Senior career*
Years	Team	Apps	(Gls)
2010	Portland Timbers U23s	12	(0)
2010	Mjøndalen	8	(1)
2011	Charleston Battery	1	(0)
- * Club domestic league appearances and goals as of April 9, 2011

Graham Andrew Dugoni (born November 24, 1986) is an American entrepreneur and former professional soccer player who is the founder of Yondr, a company that pioneered the concept of phone-free spaces with its sealed magnetic pouches.

== Early life and career ==
Dugoni was born in Portland, Oregon. He graduated with a Bachelor of Arts in political science from Duke University in 2009. He worked at a ranch in Wyoming during the summer, where he got a foot injury that kept him from playing soccer for a while. He later taught English in Vietnam and worked in finance in Portland and Atlanta.

== Career ==
=== College and amateur ===
Dugoni attended Jesuit High School, where he played both soccer and American football (as a placekicker). He was a member of the 2004 NSCAA Youth and EA Sports All-America teams, was named to the All-Star team at the prestigious adidas Elite Soccer Program (ESP), and was a member of the Region IV Olympic Development Program and Super-Y Regional Olympic Development Program teams before going in to play four years of college soccer at Duke University. He played 56 games in his career, tallying three goals and an assists for seven points.

During his college years Dugoni also played with Portland Timbers U23s in the USL Premier Development League, helping them win the PDL National Championship in 2010.

=== Professional ===
Dugoni turned professional in 2010 when he signed for Norwegian club Mjøndalen of the Adeccoligaen. He made his professional debut, and scored his first professional goal, on November 7, 2010, in a game against Nybergsund.

Dugoni returned to the United States in 2011. After impressing at open tryouts, Dugoni was invited into camp by Charleston Battery of the USL Professional Division, and played in the Carolina Challenge Cup. He signed for the team on March 23, 2011. He retired from soccer due to an injury.

== Yondr ==
Dugoni founded Yondr in 2014 after attending Treasure Island Music Festival in 2012 and witnessing a drunk concertgoer being recorded by onlookers without his permission. Dugoni started questioning modern technology's impact on freedom of expression and starting researching sociology, phenomenology, and the philosophy of technology. After experimenting with several options, he designed the Yondr pouch, which has a magnetic security tag that can be unlocked with a proprietary device. Dugoni later visited schools around San Francisco to promote the pouch. Since the invention of this pouch, many artists, school districts and even courthouses have utilized it.

== Personal life ==
Dugoni has 2 children. He uses a flip phone in his daily life.
