= Jim Rilatt =

American soccer coach (born 1963)

Personal information
- Full name: James B. Rilatt
- Date of birth: 1963 (age 62–63)
- Place of birth: Portland, Oregon, U.S.

Youth career
- Years: Team
- University of Portland

Managerial career
- Warner Pacific College (assistant)
- 1991: Lewis & Clark College
- 1992: Willamette University (women)
- 2006–2008: Pacific University (assistant)
- 2007–2010: Portland Timbers (assistant)
- 2009–2016: Portland Timbers U23s

Jim Rilatt (born 1963) is an American soccer coach who was the former head coach of the Portland Timbers U23's in the USL Premier Development League (PDL). In 2010, after an undefeated season in which the U23's won the PDL title, he was named PDL Coach of the Year.

== Career ==
Rilatt has over 20 years of experience coaching soccer in the Portland, Oregon area at the youth, high school, college and professional levels. In his 14 years coaching high school soccer, Rilatt was named Mount Hood Conference Coach of the Year five times.

As assistant coach for Warner Pacific College, Rilatt helped the Knights to two NAIA District II national titles. In 1991, he served as head coach for Lewis & Clark College and was the head coach of the women's team at Willamette University the following year.

Rilatt served as a coach, Associate Director and then Director of Coaching for F.C. Portland Soccer Academy for 13 years, coaching teams to fifteen Oregon Youth Soccer Association titles and one United States Youth Soccer Association national title in 1994.

In 2006, Rilatt was hired as an assistant coach at Pacific University under head coach Jim Brazeau and helped the Boxers recover from their worst-ever season in 2005. After his first year of coaching duties at Pacific, both Rilatt and Brazeau were added to the coaching staff of the Portland Timbers of the USL First Division.

Rilatt continued to coach youth soccer with Lake Oswego Soccer Club before being hired in 2009 as Director of Coaching for youth club EastSide United FC where Portland Timbers General Manager Gavin Wilkinson serves as Technical Director.

In 2009, Rilatt was named the inaugural head coach of the Portland Timbers U23's of the PDL, a developmental squad for the Portland Timbers. He was named PDL Coach of the Year in 2010 after leading the club during its unblemished (20–0–0) run to the PDL title.
