= Luke Kerr =

British beach soccer instructor & coach

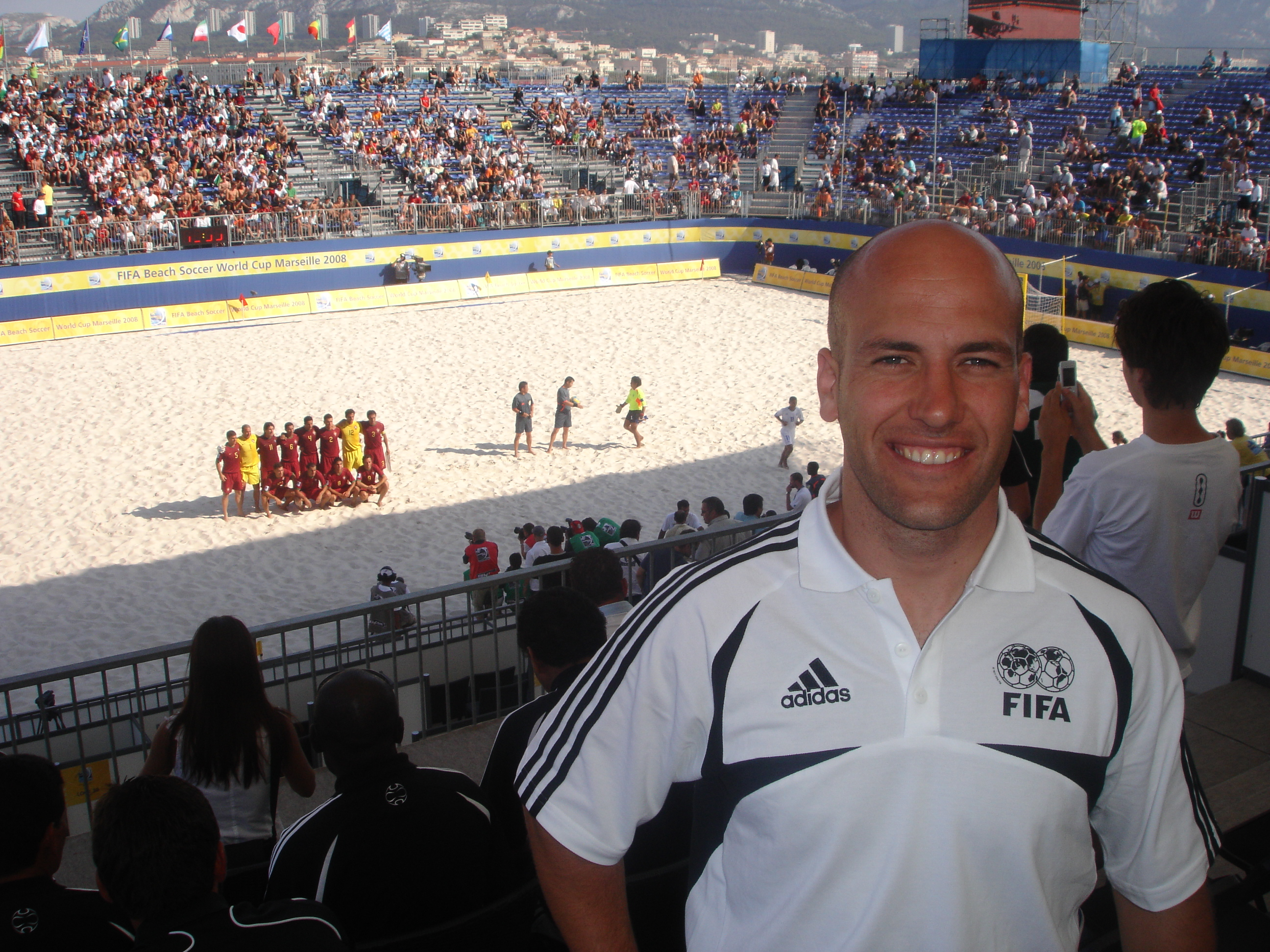

Luke Kerr is a FIFA beach soccer instructor, English Football Association and UEFA licensed football coach. Kerr attended the 2008 FIFA Beach Soccer World Cup in Marseille, France and then the 2009 World Cup in Dubai, UAE.

Part of Kerr's role as FIFA instructor is to work with international teams and players whilst producing technical analysis study reports around World Cup games for the FIFA technical team.

Whilst working for FIFA as an instructor and on the professional beach soccer circuit as a coach, Kerr has worked in close partnership with many stars of the game such as Spanish footballer Joaquín Alonso, French coach Henri Emile, Brazilian coaches Gustavo "Gugga" Zloccowick and Marcelo Mendes and French football icon Eric Cantona.

== Beach soccer and futsal ==
Kerr was the head coach of the English national team from 2007 to 2009, covering a total of 27 international matches where the team picked up 12 wins. He took England to the 2007 & 2008 Euro Beach Soccer League and the 2008 FIFA Beach Soccer World Cup Kerr started his beach soccer career by founding and establishing in what is known as the biggest beach soccer club in England, Sandown Sociedad in 2001.

He worked as a manager with club team Sandown Sociedad, guiding the club to the EBS English Cup in 2005 and the IWBSA Premier League title in 2010 whilst playing a key role outfield himself.

Upon recognising his management, leadership skills and knowledge for the game, Kerr was appointed as Performance Coach to the English National team in 2005, second to manager John Hawkins. In late 2007, John Hawkins stepped down from his position as head coach, and EBSA deemed Kerr the obvious candidate for the then vacant position. He led England into his first season in charge in 2008.

Kerr is now the general manager of beach soccer and futsal for the IW Beach Soccer Association (IWBSA) and oversees all playing and coaching development. Part of his role at IWBSA is to manage the Isle of Wight beach soccer and futsal representative sides who compete in national events.

He also continues to play an active role as a coach and as managing director of beach soccer at his home club Sandown Sociedad.

== Playing career and beach soccer achievements ==
=== Beach soccer ===
Kerr played all of his ten (10) seasons in beach soccer for English club team Sandown Sociedad BSC.

During his beach soccer playing career Kerr has won four league titles and four Cups, the EBS Charity Shield twice 2003 & 2004, the EBS English Cup 2005, Hants FA Beach Soccer Cup 2006 and most recently the IWBSA Premier League title Englands only FA affiliated beach soccer league FA Beach Soccer League all these honours were achieved with club side Sandown Sociedad .

Kerr played on the English National tour in 2008 playing for Sandown Sociedad BSC who were knocked out in the semifinals with a ruling allowing him to be signed by current England Managers team the London Knights BSC who made the national final, Kerr scoring in that final with a spectacular overhead kick.

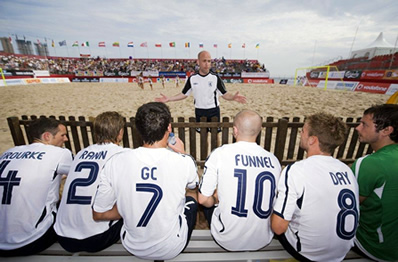

=== Beach soccer achievements ===
- 2003 EBS Beach Soccer League 2 champions “Sandown Sociedad”
- 2003 EBS Charity Shield winners “Sandown Sociedad”
- 2004 EBS Charity Shield winners “Sandown Sociedad”
- 2004 EBS Beach Soccer League 1 runners-up “Sandown Sociedad”
- 2005 EBS English Cup winners “Sandown Sociedad”
- 2005 Appointed England coach
- 2005 EBS Beach Soccer League 1 Runners up “Sandown Sociedad”
- 2006 HFA Cup winners “Sandown Sociedad”
- 2006 3rd Place Durban Beach Soccer “England”
- 2006 Moam (Gold Cost Festival) Cup winners “Sandown Sociedad”
- 2007 3rd Place UEFA European Beach Soccer League “England”
- 2007 Appointed operations director for the UK's first FA Affiliated Beach Soccer League
- 2007 Carlsberg Cup winners “Sandown Sociedad”
- 2008 Appointed England head coach
- 2008 FIFA World Cup qualifiers (qualified from the group phase) “England”
- 2008 Appointed FIFA instructor
- 2008 Attended the FIFA World Cup in France as a technical advisor
- 2009 Appointed National Game Development Manager for England
- 2009 Attended the FIFA World Cup in Dubai as a technical advisor
- 2010 IWBSA Beach Soccer Premier League winner “Sandown Sociedad”
- 2012 Beach Soccer Super Cup winners “Sandown Sociedad English Champions”
- 2013 BSWW Euro Cup Winners Cup “Sandown Sociedad”
- 2013 Beach Soccer Super Cup winners “Sandown Sociedad English Champions”
- 2016 Beach Soccer Super Cup winners “Sandown Sociedad Champions” (event has now been superseded by the English National Championships)
- 2017 Holland International Open Cup winners with “Isle Of Wight Beach Soccer team” defeating Rostocker Robben the German National Champions 5v0 in the final.

== Sports and coaching background ==
Kerr has a background in a variety of sports and is a qualified full England ABA boxing coach, FA and UEFA football licensed coach as well as a tutor and assessor; he spent several years in the British Army as a PTI (physical training instructor), where he represented the British Army at boxing, rugby, cross country and football.

Kerr is now general manager at Elite Soccer, which specialises in the coaching and development of players and teams within football, beach soccer and futsal across the UK and Europe.
