= NJ-LUSO Parma =

- Full name: NJ-LUSO Parma
- Founded: 2007 (as New Jersey Rangers)
- Ground: Morris Catholic High School; Denville, New Jersey
- Capacity: 1,500
- Owner: Aaron Balber
- Head Coach: Carlos Rasoilo
- League: USL Premier Development League
- 2014: 8th, Mid Atlantic; Playoffs: DNQ
- Website: http://www.lusosoccer.com/
Home colors	Away colors

NJ-LUSO Parma is an American soccer team based in Denville, New Jersey, United States. Founded in 2007, the team plays in the USL Premier Development League (PDL), the fourth tier of the American Soccer Pyramid, in the Mid Atlantic Division of the Eastern Conference.

The team plays its home games in the stadium on the campus of Morris Catholic High School, where they have played since 2008. The team's colors are navy blue and white.

The team also fields a team in the USL's Super-20 League, a league for players 17 to 20 years of age run under the United Soccer Leagues umbrella.

== History ==
The Rangers began their life in the PDL in a positive frame of mind under head coach Ken Cherry, but immediately found the going tough. They lost their debut game 4–1 at home to fellow expansion franchise Newark Ironbound Express, and were demolished 8–1 in their very next game at home to Ocean City Barons; coach Cherry started his third goalkeeper in three games against Westchester Flames, and although fortunes improved, they still lost 1–0, and found themselves languishing at the bottom of the divisional standings. The Rangers finally picked up their first win of the season in early June, 1–0 over Hampton Roads Piranhas off a goal by Adam Kelemet, but continued to struggle thereafter, losing their next four successive games, including a 4–0 walloping at the hands of Brooklyn Knights. The Rangers picked up their second (and final) win of the year the first weekend in July, 2–0 over Long Island Rough Riders, and were unlucky to come out on the losing end of a 7-goal thriller away in Brooklyn the following week, but faded weakly as the season ended, conceding another 6 goals in a heavy defeat to the Long Island Rough Riders in their penultimate game. The Rangers eventually finished 6th of 6 in the Northeast Division, 26 points behind divisional champions Brooklyn; testament to their lack of stability is the fact that head coach Cherry used 40 different players in the team's 16 games. Dritan Sela was top scorer, with 4 goals on the season.

== Players ==
=== Current roster ===
As of December 6, 2016.

Note: Flags indicate national team as defined under FIFA eligibility rules; some limited exceptions apply. Players may hold more than one non-FIFA nationality.

No.	Pos.	Nation	Player
13	GK	USA	Alexander Dontas
10	MF	USA	Michael Dontas
25	DF	USA	Jonathan Trigazis
16	FW	USA	Chris Marcou
11	FW	ECU	Doddi Pincay
12	DF	USA	Antonio Gonzalez
2	DF	USA	Manuel Jorge
27	FW	USA	Aidan Barret
14	MF	USA	Luke Brignola
23	DF	USA	Michael Macrino
7	DF	USA	Daniel Gonzalez
14	FW	USA	Joshua Ivlor

No.	Pos.	Nation	Player
18	FW	USA	Matt Agesen
1	GK	USA	Christian Housel
9	DF	USA	Ryan Prescott
17	GK	USA	Joseph Barbarito

=== Notable former players ===
This list of notable former players comprises players who went on to play professional soccer after playing for the team in the Premier Development League, or those who previously played professionally before joining the team.

- (United States) Bolu Akinyode
- (United States) John Borrajo
- (United States) Dilly Duka
- (United States) Samuel Petrone
- (Germany) Dominic Reinold

== Year-by-year ==
Year	Division	League	Regular season	Playoffs	Open Cup
2008	4	USL PDL	6th, Northeast	Did not qualify	Did not qualify
2009	4	USL PDL	9th, Northeast	Did not qualify	Did not qualify
2010	4	USL PDL	9th, Mid Atlantic	Did not qualify	Did not qualify
2011	4	USL PDL	8th, Mid Atlantic	Did not qualify	Did not qualify
2012	4	USL PDL	4th, Mid Atlantic	Did not qualify	Did not qualify
2013	4	USL PDL	7th, Mid Atlantic	Did not qualify	Did not qualify
2014	4	North Jersey Soccer Association	2nd, Mid Atlantic	Qualified	Qualified

== Head coaches ==
- (Greece) Jimmy Dontas (2017)
- (Ecuador) Juan Pincay (2017)

== Stadia ==
- Stadium at Morris Catholic High School; Denville, New Jersey (2008–present)

== Average attendance ==
Attendance stats are calculated by averaging each team's self-reported home attendances from the historical match archive at https://web.archive.org/web/20131208011525/http://www.uslsoccer.com/history/index_E.html.

- 2008: 150
- 2009: 60
- 2010: 101
