= UNBC Timberwolves =

Intercollegiate sports teams

- University: University of Northern British Columbia
- Association: U Sports (2012–present); CCAA (1990–2012)
- Conference: Canada West (2012–present); PWAA (1990–2012)
- Athletic director: Loralyn Murdoch
- Location: Prince George, British Columbia
- Varsity teams: 4 (2 men's, 2 women's)
- Arena: Charles Jago Northern Sport Centre
- Soccer stadium: Masich Place Stadium
- Nickname: Timberwolves
- Colours: Green and Gold
- Website: unbctimberwolves.com

The UNBC Timberwolves are the athletic teams that represent the University of Northern British Columbia in Prince George, British Columbia and currently compete in the Canada West conference of U Sports. The Timberwolves field varsity teams in basketball and soccer.

== History ==
The Timberwolves were members of the Canadian Collegiate Athletic Association (CCAA), primarily competing in the Pacific Western Athletic Association (PacWest) until the 2011–12 season. In 2011, however, they were granted probationary membership for the 2012–13 season by the Canada West Universities Athletic Association (Canada West) of the then-named Canadian Interuniversity Sport. The program first admitted the men's and women's soccer teams, as well as the men's and women's basketball teams that season. In 2014, UNBC was granted full membership to Canada West and has continued to field the aforementioned four varsity programs.

== Varsity teams ==
Men's sports	Women's sports
Basketball	Basketball
Soccer	Soccer

== Gallery ==
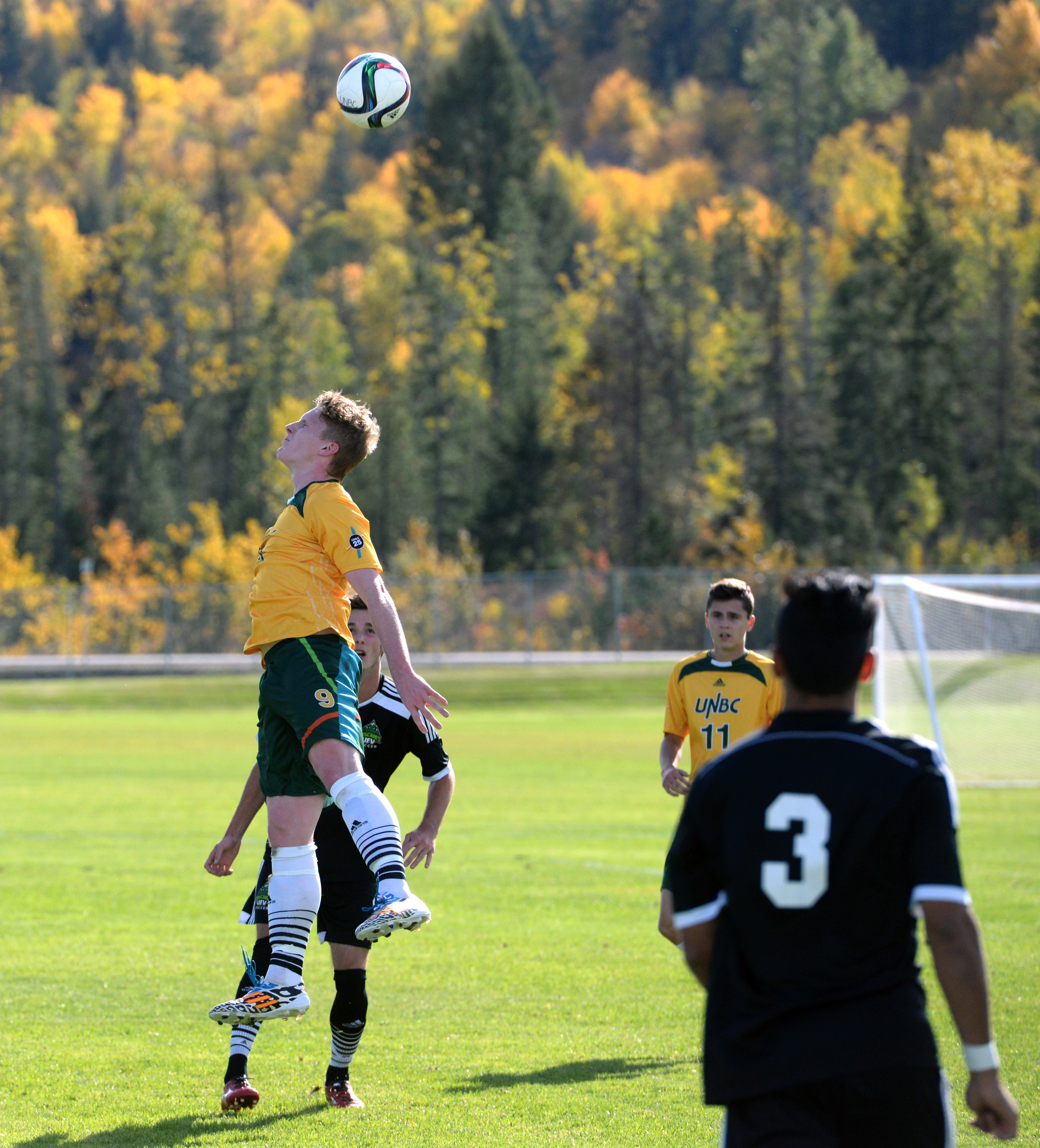
Timberwolves men's soccer team

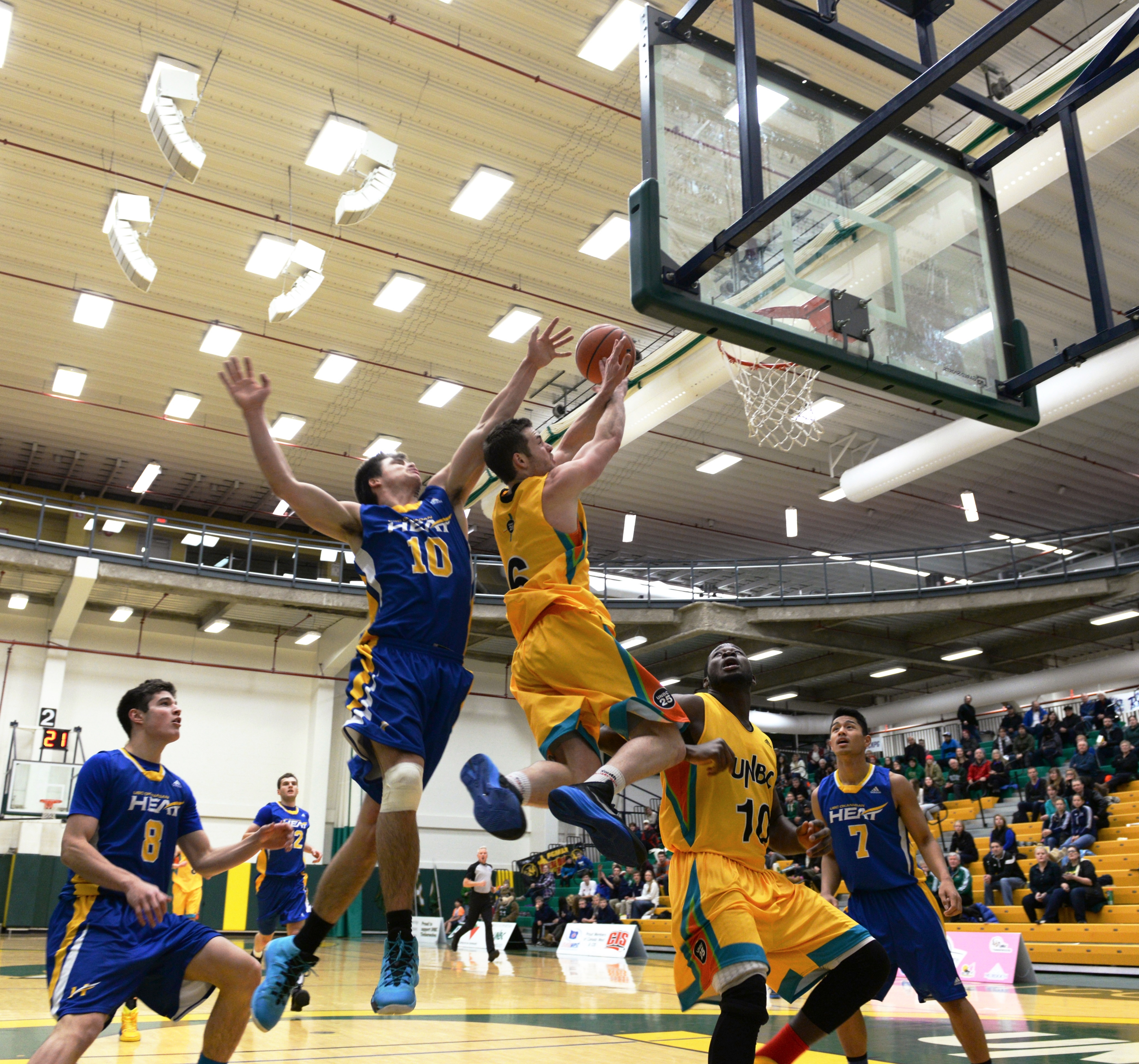
UNBC Timberwolves men's basketball team playing the UBC Okanagan Heat

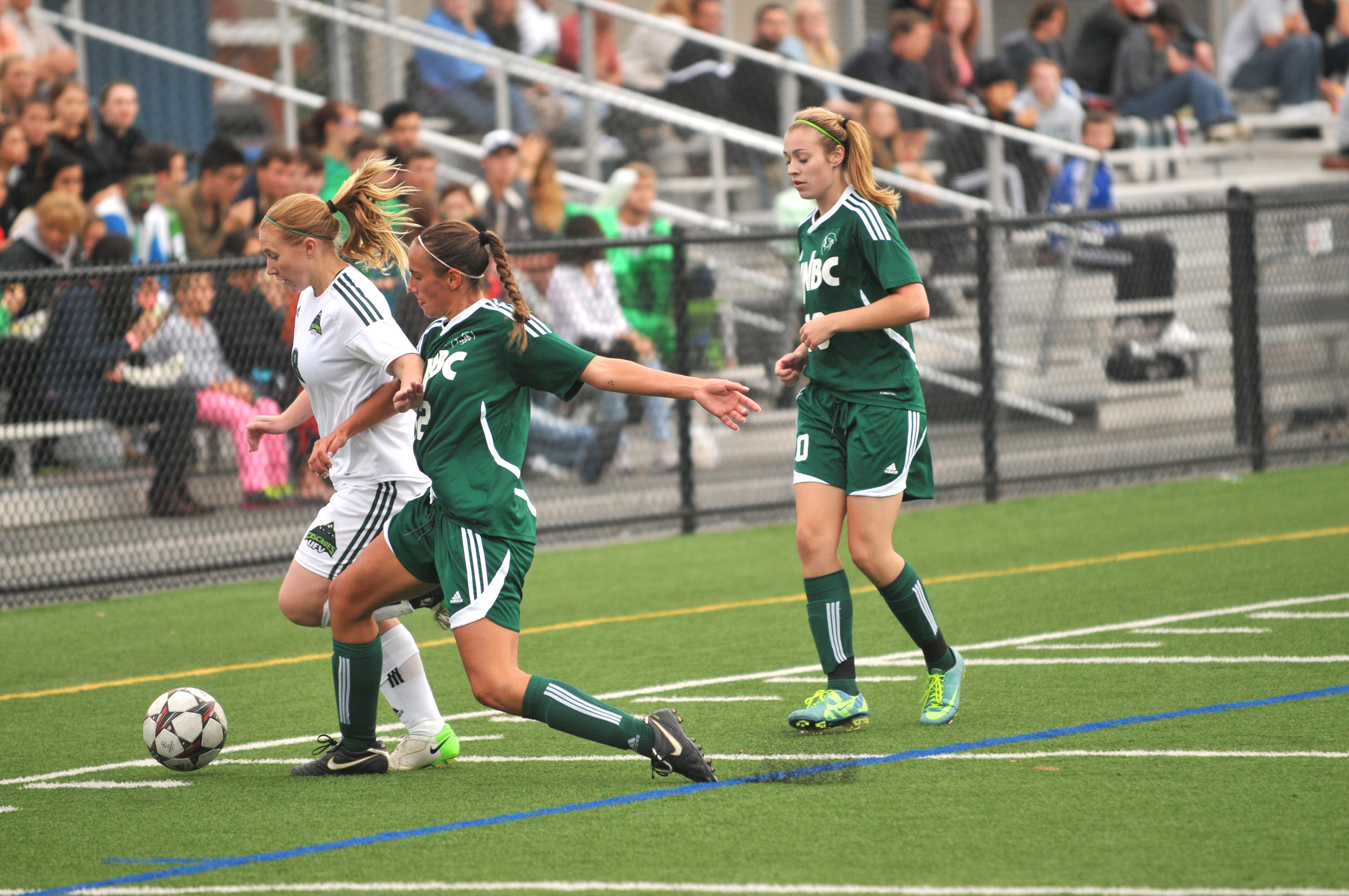
UNBC women's soccer team versus the University of Fraser Valley Cascades
