= Spokane Spiders =

- Full name: Spokane Spiders Soccer Club
- Nickname: The Spiders
- Founded: 2006
- Dissolved: 2010
- Ground: Joe Albi Stadium; Spokane, Washington
- Capacity: 28,646
- Owner: (United States) Alexander Brown
- Head Coach: (United States) Bernard Brodigan
- League: USL Premier Development League
- 2010: 9th, Northwest; Playoffs: DNQ
Home colors	Away colors

Spokane Spiders were an American soccer team based in Spokane, Washington. Founded in 2006, the team played in the USL Premier Development League (PDL), the fourth tier of the American Soccer Pyramid, in the Northwest Division of the Western Conference. The franchise folded at the end of the 2010 season and left the league thereafter.

The team played its home games at Joe Albi Stadium. The team's colors were red, black and white.

== History ==
Spokane Spiders entered the PDL in 2007, continuing the tradition of top-level minor league soccer in Eastern Washington that began with Spokane Shadow in the mid-1990s. The Spiders, under head coach Dan Philp, began quite strongly, beating Tacoma Tide 3–2 and Cascade Surge 2–1 in their first competitive games. Spokane were generally strong at home for the duration of their freshman season, enjoying four more victories at Spokane Falls Community College, but their form on the road was abysmal: they conceded 38 goals away from home while scoring just 7, and lost all of their 8 games on their travels. The nadir was a shocking 0–11 defeat to Abbotsford Mariners on the final day of the season, which left the Spiders in 5th place in the standings, 33 points behind divisional champions BYU Cougars. Jake Moug was by far Spokane's dominant player, scoring 11 of their 25 goals himself, while Ben Funkhouser contributed 4 assists.

Things went from bad to worse for Spokane in 2008. Despite the appointment of new head coach Abbas Faridnia, the Spiders lost their first game of the campaign 3–0 at home to Yakima Reds; their next game was an impressive 5–2 win over Tacoma Tide on 'neutral territory' in Idaho which saw Jay Vela score a brace; unfortunately, this was the high point of the season. Spokane took just eight points the entire rest of the season – a 1–1 tie with Cascade Surge, a battling 3–2 win over Yakima again, a 3–3 tie with Abbotsford Mariners, and a surprising 3–0 win over Vancouver Whitecaps Residency at home in their penultimate match of the season. Everything else was a struggle – Tacoma made up for their early season defeat with a 5–0 walloping at the end of May, Yakima put five past them in late June, and Cascade ended Spokane's season on a sour note with another 5-goal drubbing in the final game. Spokane were rooted to the bottom of the Northwest Division for much of the campaign, and finished three points adrift of Cascade in 8th place. Jay Vela was Spokane's top scorer, with just three goals, although Scott Davidson did tally four assists.

Jake Moug took over as head coach for the 2009 season, but things did not improve for the Spiders, who finished rock bottom of the Northwest Division for the second straight year, with just three wins and twelve goals all season long. The high points included a 3–1 win over the Seattle Wolves in early May in which the Spiders took control in the second half after the Wolves' Casey Cunningham was sent off, and the 3–2 win over the Abbotsford Mariners in June in which the Spiders held off two spirited comebacks by the Canadians and scored a 70th-minute winner through substitute Tye Perdido, despite playing for over an hour with 10 men. Elsewhere, the Spokane defense was horribly leaky: they lost 5–0 and 6–1 to Kitsap Pumas, 5–1 to Cascade Surge, 6–0 to the Vancouver Whitecaps Residency, and conceded four goals on three other occasions. Zachary Smith was the token top scorer of a dispiriting year with just 3 goals.

The team's last win was 5–4 slugfest over the Abbotsford Mariners on July 16, 2010. The following day, Sunday July 17, 2010, the Spokane Spiders lost their last game 1–5 to the Whitecaps Residency. John Prugh opening the scoring in the 24th minute. Vancouver went up 1–3 before going down to 10 men, but subsequently scored two additional late goals.

== Players ==
=== Notable former players ===
This list of notable former players comprises players who went on to play professional soccer after playing for the team in the Premier Development League, or those who previously played professionally before joining the team.

- (United States) Logan Emory
- (United States) Austin Washington

== Year-by-year ==
Year	Division	League	Regular season	Playoffs	Open Cup
2007	4	USL PDL	5th, Northwest	Did not qualify	Did not qualify
2008	4	USL PDL	8th, Northwest	Did not qualify	Did not qualify
2009	4	USL PDL	10th, Northwest	Did not qualify	Did not qualify
2010	4	USL PDL	9th, Northwest	Did not qualify	Did not qualify

== Head coaches ==
- (England) Dan Philp (2007)
- (United States) Abbas Faridnia (2008)
- (United States) Jake Moug (2009)
- (United States) Bernard Brodigan (2009–2010)

== Stadia ==
- Spokane Falls Stadium; Spokane, Washington (2007–2008)
- Plantes Ferry Park; Spokane, Washington, 1 game (2007)
- Greyhound Park; Post Falls, Idaho, (2008–2009)
- Joe Albi Stadium; Spokane, Washington (2010)

== Average attendance ==
Attendance stats are calculated by averaging each team's self-reported home attendances from the historical match archive at https://web.archive.org/web/20131208011525/http://www.uslsoccer.com/history/index_E.html.

- 2007: 424 (24th in PDL)
- 2008: 319 (34th in PDL)
- 2009: 204 (49th in PDL)
- 2010: 139 (50th in PDL)
