= 2010 MLS SuperDraft =

College draft for soccer teams

General information
- Sport: Soccer
- Date: January 14, 2010
- Time: 2:00pm (ET)
- Location: Philadelphia, Pennsylvania
- Network: ESPN2

Overview
- 64 total selections
- First selection: Danny Mwanga, Philadelphia Union
- Most selections: Philadelphia Union (6 selections)
- Fewest selections: D.C. United; Los Angeles Galaxy (1 selection)

The 2010 MLS SuperDraft was the eleventh annual SuperDraft presented by Major League Soccer. It was held on January 14, 2010 in Philadelphia, Pennsylvania, during the 2010 NSCAA Convention. The 2010 SuperDraft consisted of four rounds with sixteen selections each, for a total of 64 players selected during the draft. The draft preceded the 2010 MLS season.

Philadelphia served as host to the 2010 draft the same year the Philadelphia Union begin play in MLS. As an expansion team, Philadelphia received the rights to the first selection in each of the four rounds. As the champion from the 2009 MLS season, Real Salt Lake had the rights to the final selections in each round. As similar in other drafts, teams may trade these rights away to other teams for other rights such as players, special roster spots, or other rights of interest.

== Player selection ==
Key

*	Denotes a player contracted under the Generation Adidas program
^	Denotes player who has been selected to an MLS All-Star Game
§	Denotes a player who won the MLS Rookie of the Year
†	Denotes player who has been selected for an MLS Best XI team
~	Denotes a player who won the MLS MVP

=== Round one ===
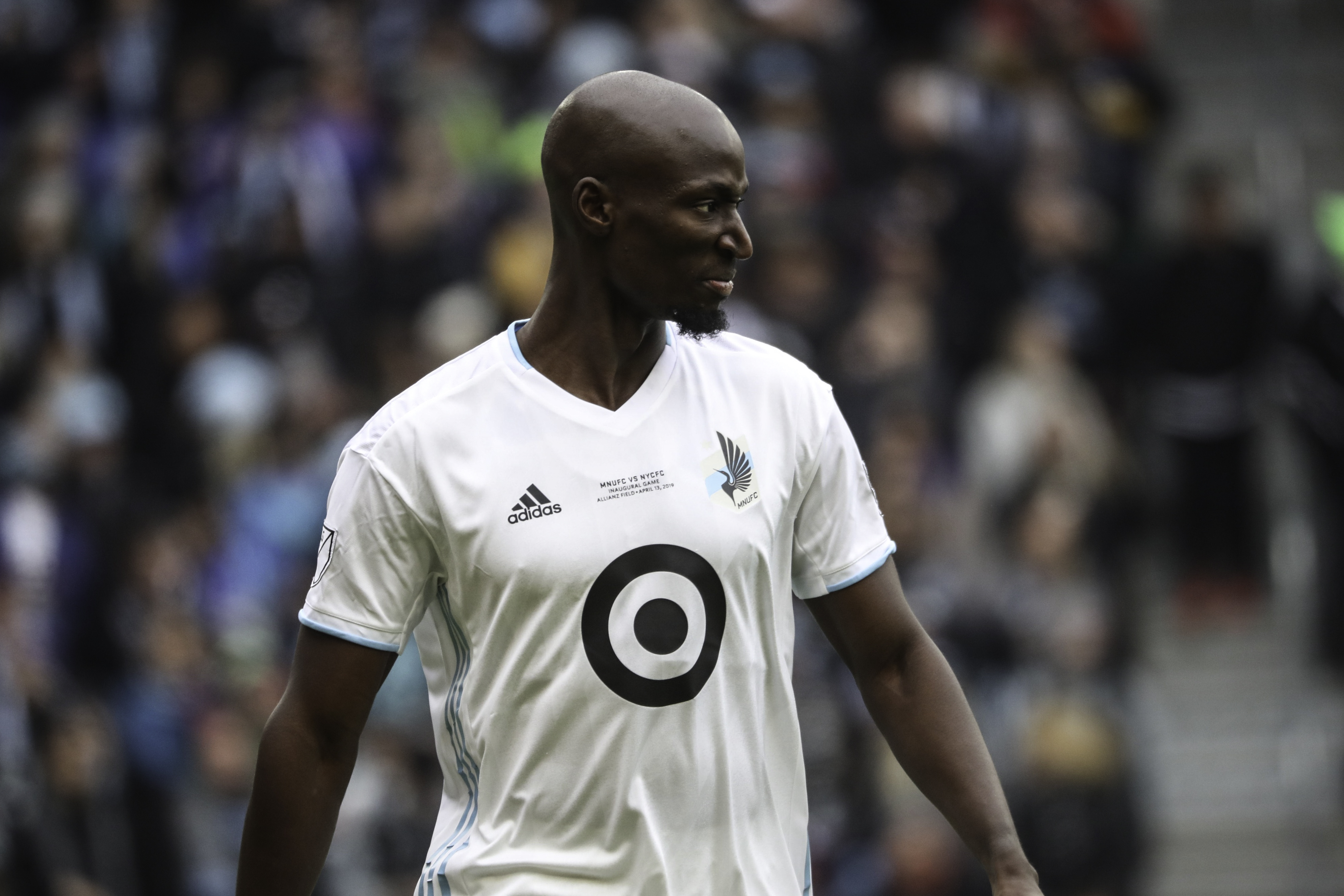
The San Jose Earthquakes selected Ike Opara 3rd overall. He is a 2x MLS Defender of the Year and 2x MLS Best XI selection.

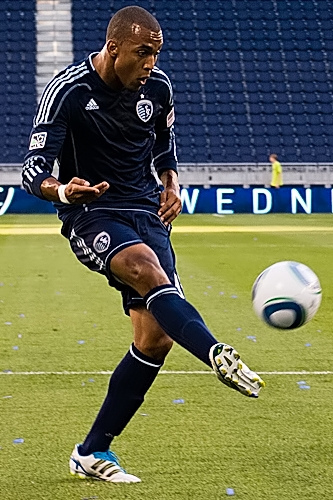
The Kansas City Wizards selected Teal Bunbury 4th overall. He has played in over 350 MLS games.

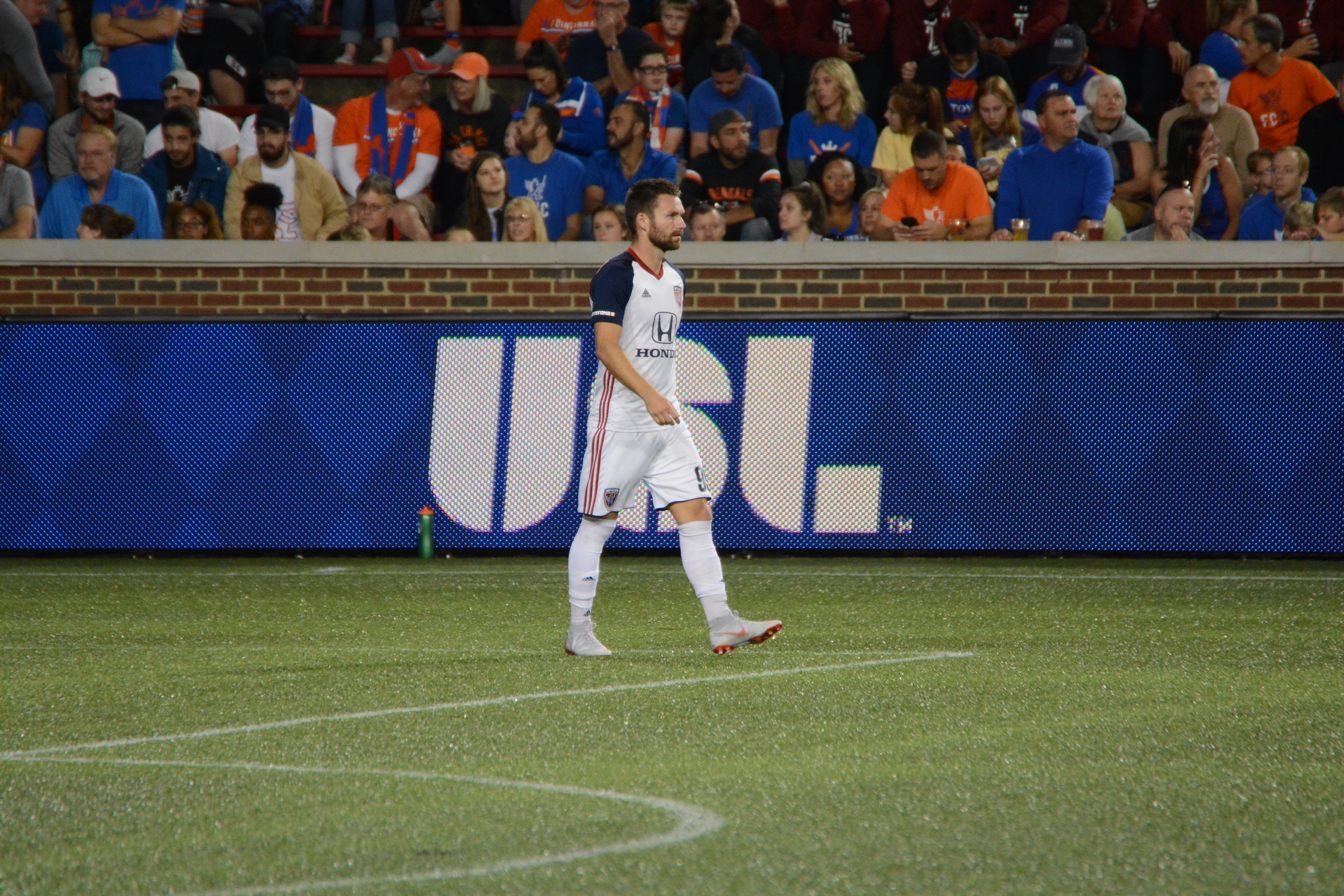
The Philadelphia Union selected Jack McInerney 7th overall. He was named to the 2013 MLS All-Star Game

Pick #	MLS Team	Player	Position	Affiliation
1	Philadelphia Union	(Democratic Republic of the Congo) Danny Mwanga*	Forward	Oregon State University
2	New York Red Bulls	(Cameroon) Tony Tchani*	Midfielder	University of Virginia; Hampton Roads Piranhas
3	San Jose Earthquakes	(United States) Ike Opara*†	Defender	Wake Forest University; Cary Clarets
4	Kansas City Wizards	(United States) Teal Bunbury*	Forward	University of Akron; Rochester Thunder
5	FC Dallas (Note: #5: Toronto FC → FC Dallas. 2009-02-24: FC Dallas acquired this first-round pick and allocation money from Toronto FC in exchange for defender Adrian Serioux. (Note: "Adrian Serioux joins Toronto" (Press release). Toronto FC Media Relations. February 24, 2009.))	(United States) Zach Loyd	Midfielder	University of North Carolina; Carolina Dynamo
6	Philadelphia Union (Note: #6: FC Dallas → Philadelphia Union. 2010-01-14: Philadelphia Union acquired this first-round pick from FC Dallas in exchange for allocation money.)	(United States) Amobi Okugo*	Midfielder	UCLA
7	Philadelphia Union (Note: #7: D.C. United → Philadelphia Union. 2010-01-14: Philadelphia Union acquired this first-round pick, allocation money, and midfielder Fred from D.C. United in exchange for the #1 selection in the MLS Allocation Order. D.C. used the allocation pick to select goalkeeper Troy Perkins.)	(United States) Jack McInerney*^	Forward	Cobb Soccer Club
8	Columbus Crew (Note: #8: Colorado Rapids → Columbus Crew. 2009-06-15: Columbus Crew acquired this first-round pick and allocation money from Colorado Rapids in exchange for forward Pat Noonan.)	(United States) Dilly Duka*	Midfielder	Rutgers University; Newark Ironbound Express
9	New England Revolution	(United States) Zack Schilawski	Forward	Wake Forest University; Cary Clarets
10	Chivas USA	(United States) Blair Gavin*	Midfielder	University of Akron; Bradenton Academics
11	Seattle Sounders FC	(United States) David Estrada	Forward	UCLA; Salinas Valley Samba
12	Columbus Crew	(Nigeria) Bright Dike	Forward	University of Notre Dame; Indiana Invaders
13	Chicago Fire	(United States) Corben Bone*	Midfielder	Wake Forest University; Carolina Dynamo
14	New York Red Bulls (Note: #14: Houston Dynamo → New York Red Bulls. 2009-05-27: New York Red Bulls acquired this first-round pick and a second-round selection in the 2011 MLS SuperDraft from Houston Dynamo in exchange for forward Dominic Oduro.)	(United States) Austin da Luz	Midfielder	Wake Forest University; Austin Aztex U23
15	Real Salt Lake (Note: #15: Los Angeles Galaxy → Real Salt Lake. 2010-01-14: Real Salt Lake acquired this first-round pick and a third-round selection in the 2011 MLS SuperDraft from Los Angeles Galaxy in exchange for midfielder Clint Mathis and the #16 pick in the 2010 SuperDraft. (Note: "Galaxy reacquire Mathis, select midfielder Stephens" (Press release). Los Angeles Galaxy Media Relations. January 14, 2010.))	(United States) Collen Warner	Midfielder	University of Portland; Portland Timbers U23's
16	Los Angeles Galaxy (Note: #16: Real Salt Lake → Los Angeles Galaxy. 2010-01-14: Los Angeles Galaxy acquired this first-round pick and midfielder Clint Mathis from Real Salt Lake in exchange for the #15 pick in the 2010 SuperDraft and a third-round selection in the 2011 MLS SuperDraft.)	(United States) Michael Stephens	Midfielder	UCLA; Chicago Fire Premier

=== Round two ===
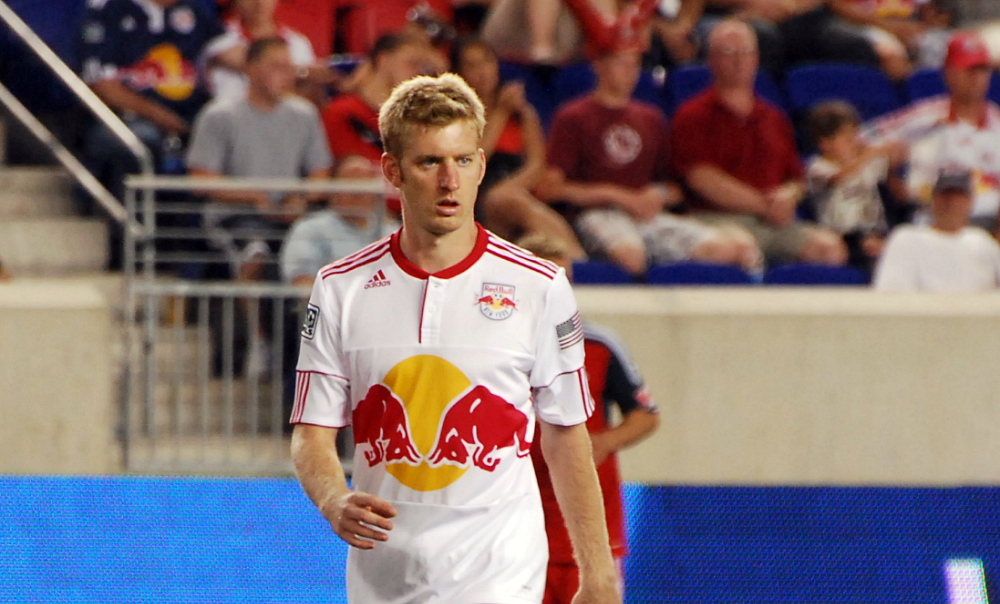
The New York Red Bulls selected Tim Ream 18th overall. The 2011 MLS All-Star has earned over 50 caps with the U.S. men's national team and was selected to the 2022 FIFA World Cup squad.

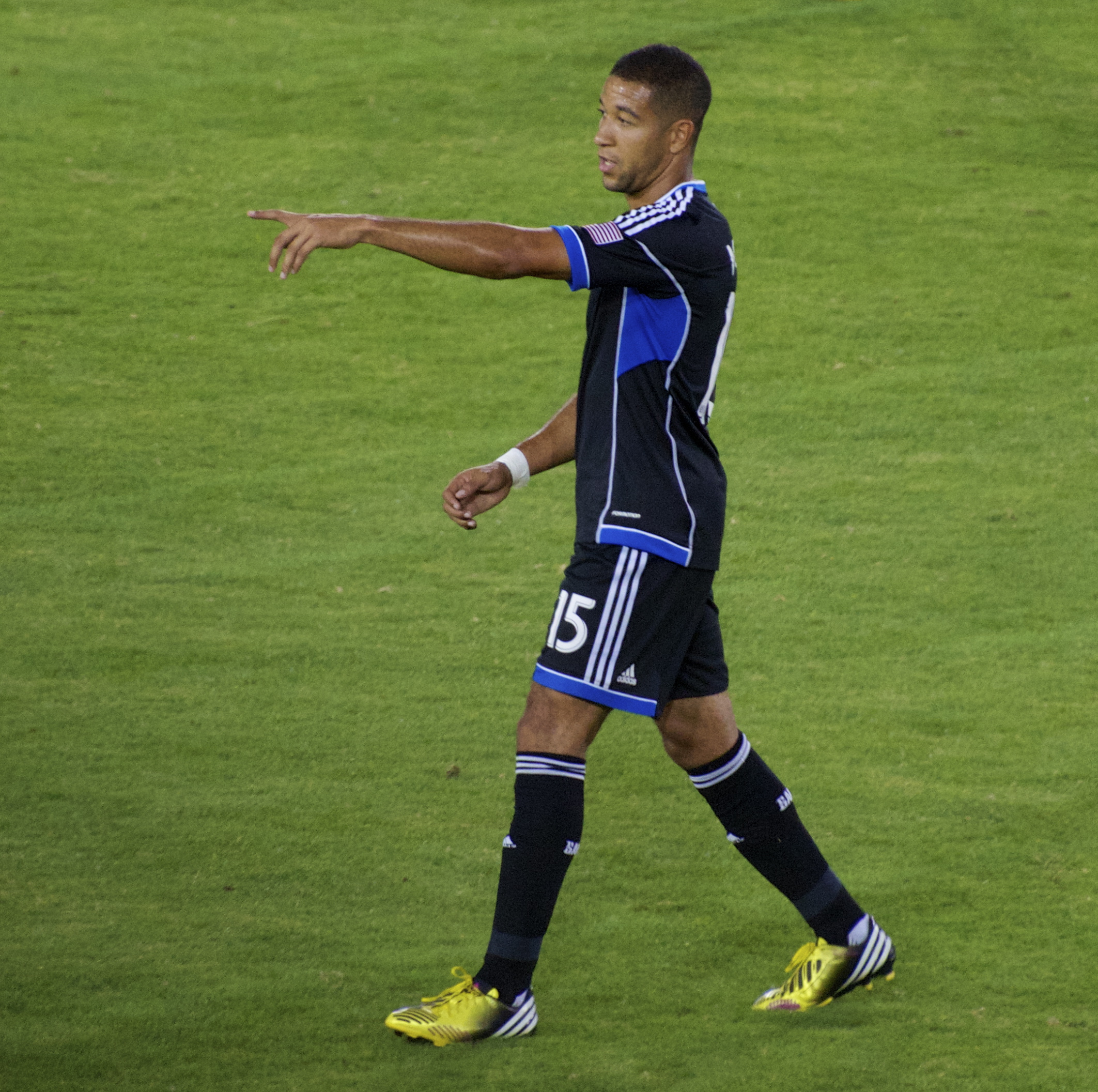
The San Jose Earthquakes selected Justin Morrow 28th overall. The 2012 MLS All-Star was named to the 2019 MLS Best XI.

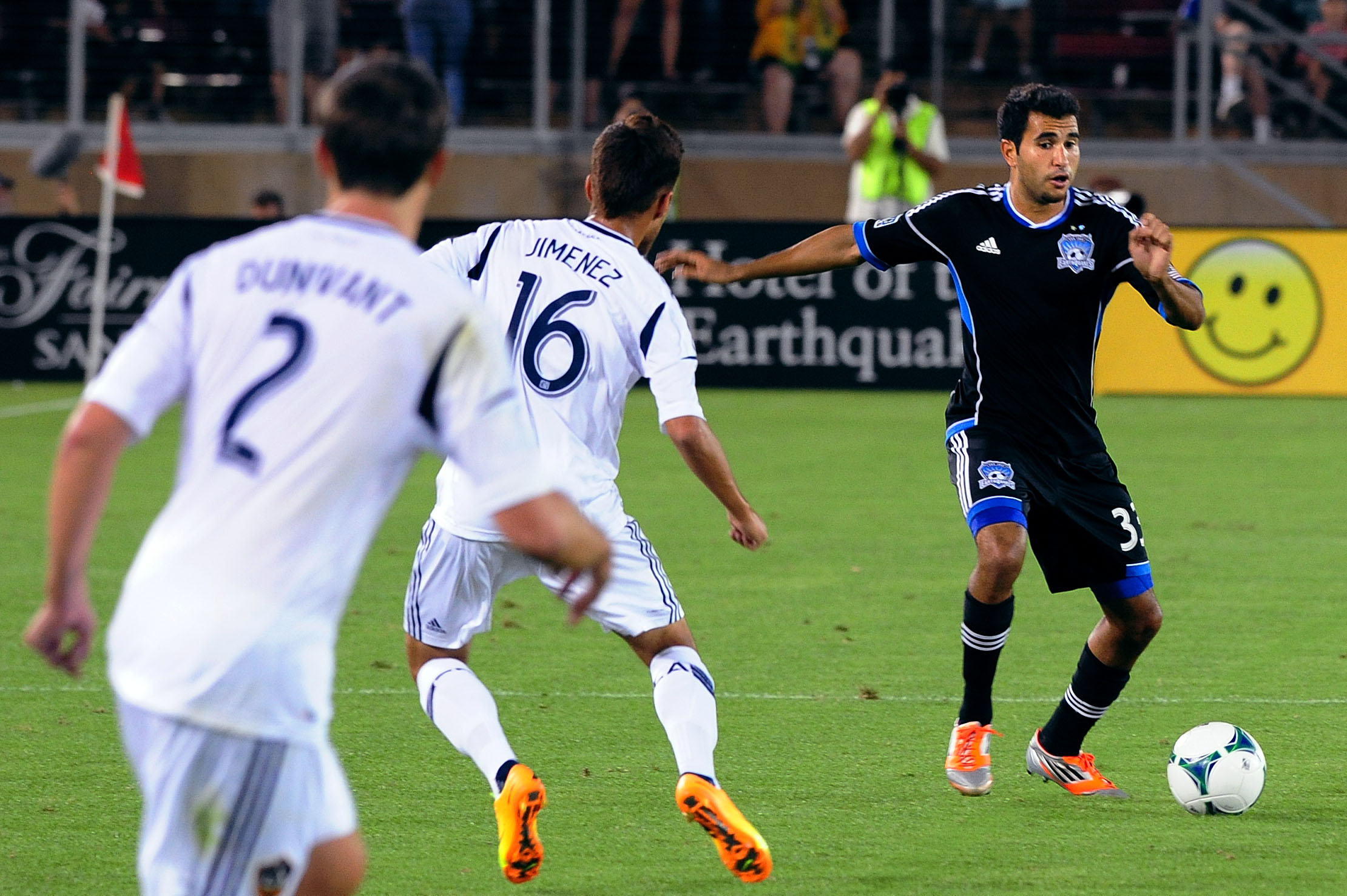
San Jose selected Steven Beitashour 30th overall. The 2012 MLS All-Star has won three Supporters' Shields and the 2017 MLS Cup. He's earned 6 caps with the Iran national football team and was selected to the 2014 FIFA World Cup squad.

Pick #	MLS Team	Player	Position	Affiliation
17	Philadelphia Union	(Finland) Toni Ståhl	Midfielder	University of Connecticut
18	New York Red Bulls	(United States) Tim Ream^	Defender	Saint Louis University; Chicago Fire Premier
19	San Jose Earthquakes	(United States) Michael Thomas	Midfielder	University of Notre Dame; Kansas City Brass
20	Kansas City Wizards	(England) Korede Aiyegbusi	Defender	North Carolina State University; Cary Clarets
21	FC Dallas (Note: #21: Toronto FC → FC Dallas. 2008-06-13: FC Dallas acquired this second-round pick, originally a conditional selection, from Toronto FC in exchange for forward Abdus Ibrahim. The conditional draft pick became a second-round pick when Ibrahim played fewer than 10 regular season games and was not traded away by Toronto. The trade also included a provision that FC Dallas is to receive 50% of any future foreign transfer fee for Ibrahim. (Note: "Breaking News - Ibrahim traded to Toronto" (Press release). FC Dallas. June 13, 2008.))	(United States) Andrew Wiedeman*	Forward	University of California; NorCal Lamorinda United
22	Colorado Rapids (Note: #22: FC Dallas → Colorado Rapids. 2009-08-31: Colorado Rapids acquired this second-round pick, defender Drew Moor, and allocation money from FC Dallas in exchange for defender Ugo Ihemelu. (Note: "FC Dallas acquires defender Ugo Ihemelu" (Press release). FC Dallas Media Relations. August 31, 2009.))	(United States) Andre Akpan	Forward	Harvard University; Chicago Fire Premier
23	Colorado Rapids (Note: #23: DC United → Colorado Rapids. 2009-02-09: Colorado Rapids acquired this second-round pick, a designated player spot, and midfielder Iván Guerrero from D.C. United in exchange for midfielder Christian Gomez, goalkeeper Mike Graczyk, an international roster spot, and salary cap considerations. (Note: "Gomez returns to D.C. United" (Press release). D.C. United Media Relations. February 9, 2009.))	(United States) Ross LaBauex	Midfielder	University of Virginia; Chicago Fire Premier
24	Toronto FC (Note: #24: Colorado Rapids → Toronto FC. 2009-02-27: Toronto FC acquired this second-round pick from Colorado Rapids in exchange for forward Gregory Richardson. (Note: "TFC acquire 2010 SuperDraft pick from Rapids" (Press release). Toronto FC Media Relations. February 27, 2009.))	(United States) Zachary Herold*	Defender	West Pines United Club
25	New England Revolution	(United States) Seth Sinovic	Defender	Creighton University; Chicago Fire Premier
26	Chicago Fire (Note: #26: Chivas USA → Chicago Fire. 2008-01-22: Chicago Fire acquired this second-round pick, originally a conditional selection, from Chivas USA in exchange for defender Jim Curtin.)	(United States) Kwame Watson-Siriboe	Defender	University of Connecticut; Westchester Flames
27	Seattle Sounders FC	(United States) Mike Seamon	Midfielder	Villanova University
28	San Jose Earthquakes (Note: #28: Columbus Crew → FC Dallas → Real Salt Lake → San Jose Earthquakes. 2009-07-15: San Jose Earthquakes acquired this second-round pick and a conditional selection in the 2011 MLS SuperDraft from Real Salt Lake in exchange for forward Pablo Campos. (Note: "Real Salt Lake Acquires FW Pablo Campos" (Press release). Real Salt Lake Media Relations. July 15, 2009.) On 2009-04-28, Real Salt Lake had acquired this pick from FC Dallas in exchange for defender Kyle Davies. (Note: "Dallas acquires US U-20 national team captain Davies" (Press release). FC Dallas Media Relations. April 28, 2009.) On 2008-01-18, FC Dallas had acquired this pick and a third-round pick in the 2010 SuperDraft from Columbus Crew in exchange for second-round and third-round picks in the 2008 MLS SuperDraft.)	(United States) Justin Morrow^†	Defender	University of Notre Dame; Chicago Fire Premier
29	Chicago Fire	(United States) Drew Yates	Midfielder	University of Maryland
30	San Jose Earthquakes (Note: #30: Houston Dynamo → San Jose Earthquakes. 2009-06-09: San Jose Earthquakes acquired this second-round pick, originally a conditional selection, and forward Chris Wondolowski from Houston Dynamo in exchange for forward Cam Weaver.)	(Iran) Steven Beitashour^	Defender	San Diego State University; San Jose Frogs
31	New England Revolution (Note: #31: LA Galaxy → New York Red Bulls → New England Revolution. 2010-01-14: New England Revolution acquired this second-round pick and pick #48 in the 2010 SuperDraft from New York Red Bulls in exchange for defender Chris Albright. On 2009-01-14, New York had acquired this pick from Los Angeles Galaxy in exchange for midfielder/forward Mike Magee. (Note: "Red Bulls trade Magee to LA Galaxy" (Press release). Red Bull New York Media Relations. January 14, 2009.))	(United States) Zak Boggs	Forward	University of South Florida; Bradenton Academics
32	Real Salt Lake	(United States) Justin Davis	Midfielder	University of New Mexico; Des Moines Menace

=== Round three ===
Pick #	MLS Team	Player	Position	Affiliation
33	Philadelphia Union	(United States) Kyle Nakazawa	Midfielder	UCLA; Los Angeles Legends
34	New York Red Bulls	(United States) Conor Chinn	Forward	University of San Francisco; Orange County Blue Star
35	Chivas USA (Note: #35: San Jose Earthquakes → Chivas USA. 2009-09-11: Chivas USA acquired this third-round pick from San Jose Earthquakes in exchange for defender Bobby Burling.)	(United States) Kevin Tangney	Defender	University of Maryland
36	Kansas City Wizards	(United States) Nick Cardenas	Defender	San Diego State University; Ogden Outlaws
37	San Jose Earthquakes (Note: #37: Toronto FC → San Jose Earthquakes. 2009-06-09: San Jose Earthquakes acquired this third-round pick from Toronto FC in exchange for defender Nick Garcia and the discovery rights to forward Ali Gerba. (Note: "Earthquakes acquire third-round pick from Toronto FC" (Press release). San Jose Earthquakes Media Relations. June 9, 2009.))	(United States) Andrew Hoxie	Forward	The College of William & Mary
38	FC Dallas	(United States) Jason Yeisley	Forward	Penn State University; Reading Rage
39	Real Salt Lake (Note: #39: D.C. United → Los Angeles Galaxy → Real Salt Lake. 2010-01-14: Real Salt Lake acquired this third-round pick from Los Angeles Galaxy in exchange for a third-round selection in the 2011 MLS SuperDraft. On 2009-03-10, Los Angeles had acquired this pick, originally a conditional selection, from D.C. United in exchange for goalkeeper Josh Wicks.)	(United States) Chris Schuler	Defender	Creighton University; Chicago Fire Premier
40	Colorado Rapids	(United States) Chad Borak	Defender	Cal State Northridge; Orange County Blue Star
41	Kansas City Wizards (Note: #41: New England Revolution → Kansas City Wizards. 2009-06-30: Kansas City Wizards acquired this third-round pick from New England Revolution in exchange for use of an international roster spot in 2009 and 2010. (Note: "Wizards acquire 2010 draft pick" (Press release). Kansas City Wizards Media Relations. June 30, 2009.))	(United States) Mauro Fuzetti	Midfielder	University of Michigan; Michigan Bucks
42	Chivas USA	(Ghana) Isaac Kissi	Midfielder	University of Dayton
43	Houston Dynamo (Note: #43: Seattle Sounders FC → Houston Dynamo. 2009-01-26: Houston Dynamo acquired this third-round pick, originally a conditional selection, from Seattle Sounders FC in exchange for defender Patrick Ianni. (Note: "Dynamo re-sign Boswell, trade Ianni" (Press release). Houston Dynamo Media Relations. January 26, 2009.))	(United States) David Walker	Midfielder	UC Santa Barbara
44	FC Dallas (Note: #44: Columbus Crew → FC Dallas. 2008-01-18: FC Dallas acquired this third-round pick and a second-round pick in the 2010 SuperDraft from Columbus Crew in exchange for second-round and third-round picks in the 2008 MLS SuperDraft.)	(United States) Eric Alexander	Midfielder	Indiana University; Kalamazoo Outrage
45	Chicago Fire	(United States) Steven Kinney	Defender	Elon University; Carolina Dynamo
46	Houston Dynamo	(Ghana) Samuel Appiah	Midfielder	Boston University
47	Chivas USA (Note: #47: Los Angeles → Chivas USA. 2009-07-01:: Chivas USA acquired this third-round pick, originally a conditional selection, and allocation money from Los Angeles Galaxy in exchange for forward Alecko Eskandarian.)	(United States) Ben Zemanski	Midfielder	University of Akron; Cleveland Internationals
48	New England Revolution (Note: #48: Real Salt Lake → New York Red Bulls → New England Revolution. 2010-01-14: New England Revolution acquired this third-round pick and pick #31 in the 2010 SuperDraft from New York Red Bulls in exchange for defender Chris Albright. On 2008-02-27, New York had acquired this pick, originally a conditional selection, from Real Salt Lake in exchange for midfielder Dema Kovalenko.)	(England) Jason Griffiths	Midfielder	University of Kentucky; Des Moines Menace

=== Round four ===
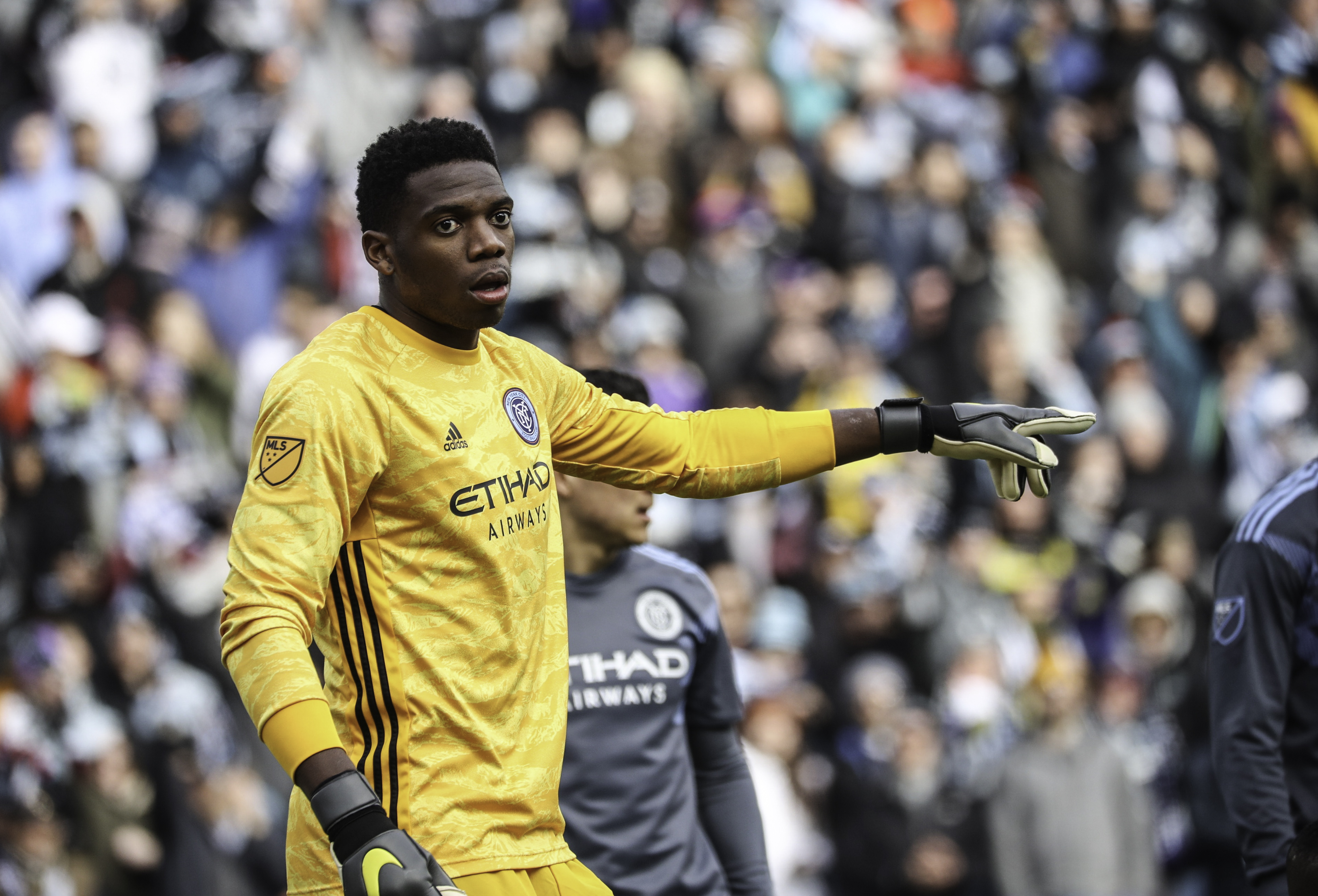
The Chicago Fire selected Sean Johnson 51st overall. The 2021 MLS Cup winner has earned 13 caps with the U.S. Men's national team and was selected to the 2022 FIFA World Cup squad.

Pick #	MLS Team	Player	Position	Affiliation
49	Philadelphia Union	(United States) Brian Perk	Goalkeeper	UCLA; Seattle Wolves
50	New York Red Bulls	(United States) Irving Garcia	Midfielder	University of California Irvine; Orange County Blue Star
51	Chicago Fire (Note: #51: San Jose Earthquakes → Chicago Fire. Though not confirmed, Chicago likely acquired this pick in exchange for the rights to forward Ryan Johnson on 4 April 2008. That trade was for a 2010 fourth-round supplemental draft choice but the supplemental draft was abolished after 2008. (Note: "Fire trade Ryan Johnson to San Jose" (Press release). MLSSoccer.com. January 23, 2010 [trade date 2008-04-04].))	(United States) Sean Johnson*	Goalkeeper	University of Central Florida; Atlanta Blackhawks
52	Kansas City Wizards	(United States) Ofori Sarkodie	Defender	Indiana University
53	Toronto FC	(Cameroon) Joseph Nane	Midfielder	Old Dominion University; Hampton Roads Piranhas
54	FC Dallas	(United States) Dane Saintus	Midfielder	Southern Methodist University; DFW Tornados
55	D.C. United	(United States) Jordan Graye	Defender	University of North Carolina; Cary Clarets
56	Colorado Rapids	(United States) Chris Cutshaw	Midfielder	Bradley University; Chicago Fire Premier
57	New England Revolution	(United States) Adam Welch	Defender	Lehigh University; Reading Rage
58	Chivas USA	(United States) Chris Ross	Midfielder	Colgate University; DFW Tornados
59	Seattle Sounders FC	(United States) Jamel Wallace	Midfielder	San Diego State University
60	Columbus Crew	(Switzerland) Kwaku Nyamekye	Defender	Harvard University
61	Columbus Crew (Note: #61: Chicago Fire → Columbus Crew. 2008-01-21: Columbus Crew acquired this fourth-round pick from Chicago Fire in exchange for the MLS rights to forward Andy Herron. (Note: "Chicago Fire sign forward Andy Herron" (Press release). Chicago Fire Media Relations. February 14, 2008.))	(United States) Othaniel Yanez	Midfielder	University of Louisville; Yakima Reds
62	Houston Dynamo	(United States) Euan Holden	Defender	University of New Mexico; Austin Aztex U23
63	Columbus Crew (Note: #63: Los Angeles Galaxy → Columbus Crew. 2009-01-09: Columbus Crew acquired this fourth-round pick from Los Angeles Galaxy in exchange for midfielder Stefani Miglioranzi. (Note: "Galaxy reacquire Miglioranzi from Crew" (Press release). Los Angeles Galaxy Media Relations. January 9, 2009.))	(Jamaica) Shaun Francis	Defender	Lindsey Wilson College; Thunder Bay Chill
64	Real Salt Lake	(United States) Kris Banghart	Defender	University of Denver; Real Colorado Foxes

== Selections by affiliation ==
Rank	Affiliation	No.
1	Chicago Fire Premier	8
2	UCLA	5
T3	Wake Forest University	4
T3	Cary Clarets	4
T5	University of Akron	3
T5	University of Notre Dame	3
T5	San Diego State University	3
T5	Carolina Dynamo	3
T5	Orange County Blue Star	3
T10	15 Affiliations	2
T24	44 Affiliations	1

== Selections by position ==
Round	Forwards	Midfielders	Defenders	Goalkeepers
1st	6	9	1	0
2nd	3	6	7	0
3rd	3	8	5	0
4th	0	7	7	2
Totals	12	30	20	2

== Trade note ==
- Los Angeles Galaxy traded the rights to American midfielder/forward Clint Mathis to Real Salt Lake on 2008-08-14. It was reported that LA would receive a conditional fourth-round pick in the 2010 SuperDraft from RSL in exchange. However, RSL kept its fourth-round 2010 selection and instead sent its natural third-round selection in the 2011 MLS SuperDraft to Los Angeles to complete the deal.

== 2010 Supplemental Draft Trades ==
In December 2008 the league decided to cancel the Supplemental Draft, which had typically been held shortly after the annual SuperDraft. Prior to the cancellation a few trades were made involving 2010 Supplemental Draft picks. It is unknown what compensation, if any, clubs trading for 2010 Supplemental Draft picks received in lieu of the draft picks. Announced trades involving 2010 Supplemental Draft selections include:

- Round 4, San Jose Earthquakes → Chicago Fire. 2008-04-04: Chicago Fire acquired a fourth-round selection in the 2010 Supplemental Draft from San Jose Earthquakes in exchange for forward Ryan Johnson. It is likely that Chicago instead received San Jose's fourth-round pick in the 2010 SuperDraft (#51) to fulfill this trade as no trade was announced between the two clubs which involved a fourth-round 2010 SuperDraft pick.
- Round 4, D.C. United → Houston Dynamo. 2008-06-30: Houston Dynamo acquired a fourth-round selection in the 2010 Supplemental Draft from D.C. United in exchange for midfielder Craig Thompson.
- Conditional, Los Angeles Galaxy → San Jose Earthquakes. 2008-11-24: San Jose Earthquakes acquired a conditional selection in the 2010 Supplemental Draft from Los Angeles Galaxy in exchange for forward Jovan Kirovski.
