= Nanchoff =

Nanchoff is a surname. Notable people with the surname include:

- George Nanchoff (born 1955), American soccer player
- Louis Nanchoff (born 1956), American soccer player, brother of George
- Michael Nanchoff (born 1988), American soccer player and coach, son of George
