= Akron Zips men's soccer =

Men's soccer team of the University of Akron

- 2026 Akron Zips men's soccer team
- Founded: 1954; 72 years ago
- University: University of Akron
- Athletic director: Andrew Goodrich
- Head coach: Jared Embick (14th season)
- Conference: Big East
- Location: Akron, Ohio, US
- Stadium: FirstEnergy Stadium (capacity: 5,800)
- Nickname: Zips
- Colors: Navy and white
Home	Away

NCAA tournament championships
- 2010

NCAA tournament runner-up
- 1986, 2009, 2018

NCAA tournament College Cup
- 1986, 2009, 2010, 2015, 2017, 2018

NCAA tournament Quarterfinals
- 1967, 1986, 2005, 2009, 2010, 2015, 2017, 2018, 2025; Division II – 1972

NCAA tournament Round of 16
- 1966, 1967, 1983, 1986, 2005, 2006, 2007, 2008, 2009, 2010, 2011, 2012, 2015, 2017, 2018, 2025; Division II – 1972

NCAA tournament appearances
- 1966, 1967, 1983, 1984, 1985, 1986, 1998, 2002, 2004, 2005, 2006, 2007, 2008, 2009, 2010, 2011, 2012, 2013, 2014, 2015, 2016, 2017, 2018, 2021, 2022, 2024, 2025; Division II – 1972

Conference tournament championships
- 1998, 2002, 2004, 2005, 2007, 2008, 2009, 2010, 2012, 2013, 2014, 2015, 2016, 2017, 2018

Conference regular season championships
- 1993, 1995, 1997, 1998, 1999, 2000, 2002, 2005, 2006, 2007, 2008, 2009, 2010, 2011, 2012, 2013, 2014, 2015, 2016, 2019, 2022

The Akron Zips men's soccer team is an intercollegiate varsity sports team of the University of Akron. As of the 2023 NCAA Division I men's soccer season, the Zips play in the Big East Conference. This move followed Akron's full-time home of the Mid-American Conference (MAC) shutting down its men's soccer league after the 2022 season.

Akron is regularly ranked in the Top 10 NSCAA collegiate men's soccer poll. They have been ranked No. 1 previously in 2005, 2009, 2010, and 2016. The Zips have played their home games at FirstEnergy Stadium-Cub Cadet Field, formerly named Lee R. Jackson Soccer Field and Cub Cadet Field, since 1966. They won their first national championship in 2010.

== History ==
In 1954, an Oberlin College transfer named Stu Parry started the soccer team at Akron. That year, they finished the season with two wins and one tie. The next year, men's soccer was officially offered by the university and after starting the season with two losses, they ended with a 2–4–1 record, with the team's first win coming against rival Kent State.

Parry eventually led the team to nine Ohio College Soccer Association titles as well as six NCAA playoff appearances. In 1986, the men's soccer team gained the most exposure in the NCAA tournament, finishing second to Duke by a score of 1–0. A Duke player, Ken Lolla, took over the program in 1993 and then became Akron's all-time winningest coach, with a record of 160–68–25. He also led the team to their first No. 1 ranking, which was also the first ever MAC team in any sport to be ranked No. 1.

In 2006, Caleb Porter became head coach, leading the team to first-place finishes in the conference every year from 2007 to 2012, an appearance in the final of the national championship (the College Cup) in 2009, and a national championship in 2010.

Jared Embick succeeded Porter as head coach after the 2012 season. The team has finished first in the conference every year since, and reached the national semi-final in 2015.

After the 2022 season, the MAC, whose men's soccer league had been decimated by conference realignment earlier in the decade, dropped that sport. Akron moved men's soccer to the Big East Conference, making it the only one of the four full MAC members with men's soccer teams that did not move that sport to the Missouri Valley Conference.

== Colors and badge ==
The team uses the school colors of blue and gold.

== Stadium ==
Lee Jackson Field was dedicated on October 22, 1966. Along with the soccer venue, the 23-acre (93,000 m^{2}) complex also includes fields for the school's baseball, softball, and track and field competition areas along with a practice field for the football team. The fields are located towards the southeast corner of the University of Akron campus, just west of InfoCision Stadium.

Other expansions and upgrades for the stadium have included a grandstand with seating capacity of 2,200, berm seating around the stadium with a capacity of 2,600, and lighting which meets national television specifications.

Announced in March 2011 was a partnership between The University of Akron and Cub Cadet, the premier brand of Cleveland-based MTD Products, which will rename the Zips' new, state-of-the-art grass soccer field Cub Cadet Field.

In June 2011, the field was renamed FirstEnergy Stadium-Cub Cadet field after Cub Cadet as well as First Energy plans were announced to build 300 new bleacher seats, permanent restrooms, and a concession stand along with the renaming.

== Supporters ==
The AK-ROWDIES are a student organization which cheer on sports teams in various sports at the university. The ROWDIES were formed as an official student organization in 2005. During the soccer games, they can be found behind the goal area, heckling the opponent's goalie.

== Notable alumni ==
- (United States) Niko De Vera (2014–2017) – Currently with Portland Timbers
- (United States) Conrad Earnest
- (United States) George Nanchoff (1973–1976) – Retired
- (United States) Louis Nanchoff (1974–1977) – Retired
- (England) Benny Dargle (1975–1977) – Retired
- (England) Shaun Pendleton (1982–1985) – Retired
- (Canada) Roderick Scott (1985–88) – Retired
- (New Zealand) Cameron Knowles (2001–04) – Retired
- (United States) Devon McKenney (2003–2007)
- (Bosnia and Herzegovina) Siniša Ubiparipović (2004–2006) – Retired
- (United States) Evan Bush (2005–2008) – Currently with Columbus Crew
- (United States) Justin Sadler (2005)
- (United States) Ben Zemanski (2006–2009)
- (Democratic Republic of the Congo) Steve Zakuani (2006–2007) – Retired
- (United States) Chris Korb (2007–2010)
- (United States) Michael Nanchoff (2007–2010) – Retired
- (United States) Blair Gavin (2007–2009) – Retired
- (United States) Teal Bunbury (2008–2009) – Currently with Nashville SC
- (United States) Darlington Nagbe (2008–2010) – Retired
- (Thailand) Anthony Ampaipitakwong (2007–2010) – Currently with Bangkok United
- (United States) Kofi Sarkodie (2008–2010)
- (United States) Zarek Valentin (2009–2010) – Currently with the Houston Dynamo
- (United States) Scott Caldwell (2009–2012) – Currently with the Real Salt Lake
- (United States) Chad Barson (2009–2012) – Retired
- (Jamaica) Darren Mattocks (2010–2011) – Retired
- (United States) Perry Kitchen (2010) – Currently with LA Galaxy
- (United States) DeAndre Yedlin (2011–2012) – Currently with FC Cincinnati
- (United States) Aodhan Quinn (2011–2013) – Currently with Phoenix Rising
- (United States) Wil Trapp (2011–2012) – Currently with Minnesota United FC
- (United States) Dillon Serna (2012) – Currently with the Colorado Rapids
- (United States) Saad Abdul-Salaam (2012–2014) – Currently with Seattle Sounders FC
- (Canada) Richie Laryea (2014–2015) – Currently with Toronto FC
- (United States) Adam Najem (2013–2016) – Currently with Bhayangkara
- (United States) Jonathan Lewis (2016) – Currently with Colorado Rapids
- (Portugal) João Moutinho (2018) – 2018 MLS Superdraft First-Overall Draft Pick for Los Angeles FC
- (Somalia) Abdi Mohamed (2018) - Currently with New Mexico United

== Previous head coaches ==
Listed according to when they became head coach for Akron (year in parentheses):

- 1950s–1960s: Stu Parry (1955)
- 1970s–1980s: Bill Killen (1970), Robert Dowdy (1974), Steve Parker (1982)
- 1990s–2000s (decade): Ken Lolla (1993), Caleb Porter (2006)

== Honours ==
- NCAA Division I Championship:
  - Winners (1): 2010
  - Runners-up (3): 1986, 2009, 2018
- Mid-American Conference tournament:
  - Winners (15): 1998, 2002, 2004, 2005, 2007, 2008, 2009, 2010, 2012, 2013, 2014, 2015, 2016, 2017, 2018
  - Runners-up (4): 1995, 1997, 2001, 2006
- Mid-American Conference regular season:
  - Winners (17): 1993, 1995, 1997, 1998, 1999, 2000, 2002, 2005, 2006, 2007, 2008, 2009, 2010, 2011, 2012, 2013, 2014, 2015, 2016
  - Runners-up (5): 1994, 1996, 2001, 2003, 2004
- Ohio College Soccer Association:
  - Winners (19): 1958, 1959, 1960, 1961, 1963, 1964, 1966, 1967, 1968, 1971, 1975, 1976, 1980, 1981, 1982, 1983, 1984, 1986, 1987
- Mid-Continent Conference Regular Season:
  - Winners (1): 1991

== Records ==
- Most Goals in a game: 14 (12–2) vs. Cleveland State, September 9, 2005
- Most Goals in a half: 8 vs. Green Bay, 1986
- Lee Jackson Field attendance: 4,744 vs. Tulsa, September 22, 2010
- FirstEnergy Stadium–Cub Cadet Field attendance: 5,819 vs. Ohio State, September 28, 2011

== See also ==
- Akron Zips football
- Akron Zips men's basketball
- Collegiate soccer
- 2010 Akron Zips men's soccer team
