= Mark Briggs =

English footballer (born 1982)

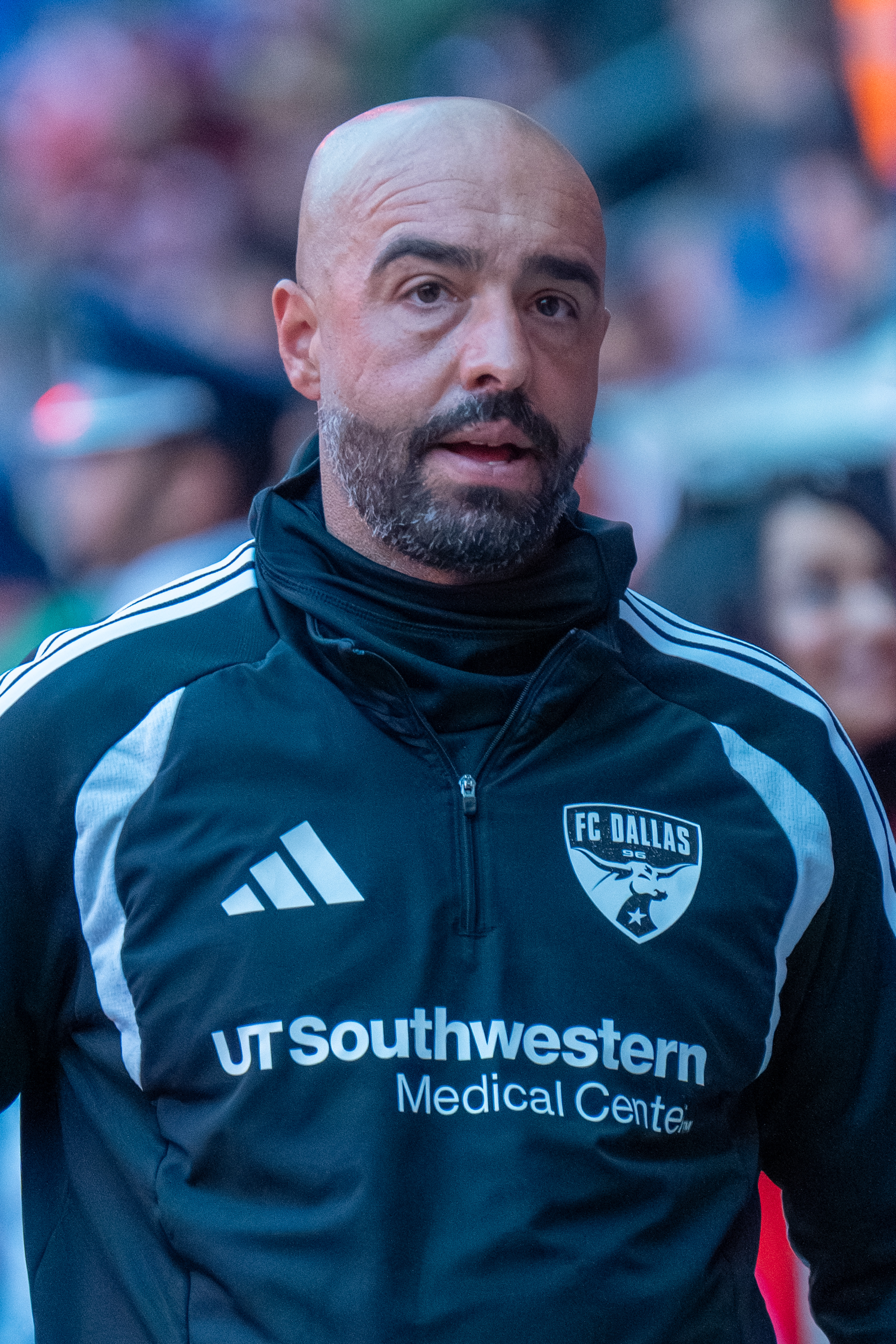
- Briggs with FC Dallas in 2026

Personal information
- Full name: Mark Jonathan Briggs
- Date of birth: 16 February 1982 (age 44)
- Place of birth: Wolverhampton, England
- Position: Midfielder

Youth career
- West Bromwich Albion

Senior career*
Years	Team	Apps	(Gls)
1998–2003	West Bromwich Albion	0	(0)
2003–2004	Herfølge	1	(0)
2004	Notts County	0	(0)
2004	Tipton Town	3	(0)
2004	AFC Telford United	6	(0)
2004–2005	Shrewsbury Town	0	(0)
2005	Northwich Victoria	3	(0)
2005	Redditch United	8	(0)
2005	The New Saints	0	(0)
2005	Welshpool Town	4	(0)
2005–2006	Hednesford Town	18	(0)
2006	Willenhall Town		
2007	Chasetown	2	(0)
2008	Kalamazoo Outrage	14	(6)
2008–2009	Hednesford Town		
2009	Wilmington Hammerheads		
2009–2011	Mosta		
2010	→ Charleston Battery (loan)	0	(0)
2011	Tooting & Mitcham United		
2011–2012	Rushall Olympic		
2012–2013	Wilmington Hammerheads		

Managerial career
- 2015: Wilmington Hammerheads (assistant)
- 2015–2016: Wilmington Hammerheads
- 2016–2017: Real Monarchs (assistant)
- 2017–2018: Real Monarchs
- 2019: Sacramento Republic (academy director)
- 2019–2024: Sacramento Republic
- 2025: Birmingham Legion FC
- 2026–: FC Dallas (assistant)
- * Club domestic league appearances and goals

Mark Jonathan Briggs (born 16 February 1982) is an English football coach and former player who is the assistant coach of FC Dallas in the MLS.

== Playing career ==
=== England and Denmark ===
Briggs began his career with West Bromwich Albion, joining them on leaving Sedgley's Dormston School in the summer of 1998. Briggs captained the youth team to a cup win at Wembley Stadium in 1999 and was Youth Team Player of the Year the same season. In 1999, he also signed his first professional contract. He made his first team debut in the 2000–01 season. After making 12 first-team and 150 reserve-team appearances for the Baggies, he moved to Danish football for two seasons with Herfølge in 2002, where they were the Danish 1st Division Champions and won promotion to Supa Liga.

Briggs then proceeded to bounce around the English and Welsh lower leagues, playing briefly for a multitude of clubs including Notts County, Shrewsbury Town, Hednesford Town. He then crossed the pond and played for Kalamazoo Outrage before returning for a second stint at Hednesford Town. Briggs then went back to America and spent the 2009 season with the Wilmington Hammerheads before signing with Mosta FC in Malta, where he was Player of the Year in 2009, 2010, and 2011. Briggs then returned to Wilmington, where he finished his career and transitioned into coaching with the Wilmington Hammerheads.

=== United States and Malta ===
In May 2008, Briggs was convinced to cross the Atlantic by former New Zealand international Stu Riddle to play for Kalamazoo Outrage in the USL Premier Development League as an over-age player. He played the PDL season in Kalamazoo, helping the team reach the PDL playoffs.

After a brief stint back in England with Hednesford in the US offseason, Briggs signed with the Wilmington Hammerheads in the USL Second Division in 2009. The Hammerheads won the USL 2 title, and Briggs was the team's Player of the Year.

Following the end of the American season, Briggs signed for Mosta of the Maltese First Division on a two-year contract on 1 October 2009.

On 25 February 2010, Charleston Battery announced the signing of Briggs on loan then for the remaining season.

A spell with Tooting & Mitcham United, whom he joined for the 2011–12 season, was followed in December 2011 by a move to Rushall Olympic.

In February 2012, he rejoined Wilmington Hammerheads for a second spell in the USL Pro Division. After the 2012 season, Briggs was named the Hammerheads Player of the Year.

== Managerial career ==
In November 2016, Briggs joined Mike Petke's staff at Real Monarchs as an assistant. Upon Petke's promotion to the Real Salt Lake senior team in March 2017, Briggs was elevated to head coach for Real Monarchs. On 20 November 2017, Briggs was named USL coach of the year after leading the Monarchs to the playoffs for the first time in their history.

In 2019, Briggs joined USL Championship club Sacramento Republic FC as Academy Director. Briggs was promoted to head coach for the 2020 season. On 7 December 2021, the Republic announced that Briggs had agreed to a new contract to bring him back for the 2022 season. On 13 July 2022, Briggs was named USL Championship coach of the month for June 2022 after leading the club to victory in all four of their league games and reaching the semifinals of the 2022 U.S. Open Cup for the first time. On November 4th, 2024 it was announced that Sacramento Republic and Mark Briggs mutually agreed to part ways.

In January 2026, FC Dallas of Major League Soccer announced the hiring of Briggs as first-team assistant under head coach Eric Quill.

== Honours ==
=== As player ===
Wilmington Hammerheads

- USL Second Division Regular Season: 2009

=== As manager ===
Real Monarchs SLC

- USL Championship Regular Season: 2017

Individual

- USL Championship Coach of the Year: 2017
