= Michael Nanchoff =

American soccer player (born 1988)

Michael John Nanchoff
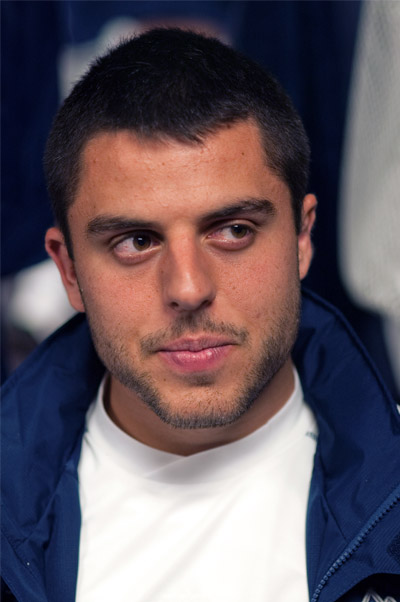

Personal information
- Date of birth: September 23, 1988 (age 38)
- Place of birth: North Royalton, Ohio, United States
- Height: 5 ft 8 in (1.73 m)
- Position: Winger

Youth career
- 1995–2007: Internationals SC

College career
Years	Team	Apps	(Gls)
2007–2010	Akron Zips	62	(16)

Senior career*
Years	Team	Apps	(Gls)
2006–2009	Cleveland Internationals	38	(17)
2011–2012	Vancouver Whitecaps FC	24	(1)
2011	→ Vancouver Whitecaps FC U-23 (loan)	4	(6)
2013–2015	Portland Timbers	18	(4)
2013	→ Jönköpings Södra (loan)	11	(4)
2015	→ Portland Timbers 2 (loan)	6	(3)
2016–2018	Tampa Bay Rowdies	58	(1)

Managerial career
- 2019–: Akron Zips (assistant)
- * Club domestic league appearances and goals

Michael Nanchoff (born September 23, 1988) is an American retired soccer player who is currently an assistant coach for the Akron Zips men's soccer team.

== Career ==
=== College and amateur ===
Before college, Nanchoff played for Walsh Jesuit High School in Ohio where he won an OHSAA State Championship in 2006. He then spent four years at the University of Akron playing in three after redshirting the 2008 season. He skipped his final year of NCAA eligibility to sign a lucrative Generation Adidas contract after being named one of the top collegiate players by several sources.

Nanchoff also played for the Cleveland Internationals in the USL Premier Development League.

=== Professional ===
Nanchoff was drafted in the first round (8th overall) in the 2011 MLS SuperDraft, thereby helping Akron set a record for the most players drafted in the first round and the most players drafted overall from one school in an MLS SuperDraft. After missing the first several months of the season with an injury, he made his professional debut on June 4, 2011, as a late substitute in a 2–0 loss to Real Salt Lake.

Nanchoff was not retained by the Whitecaps following the 2012 season. On February 13, 2013, his rights were traded to Portland Timbers in exchange for a fourth-round 2015 MLS SuperDraft pick.

on July 9, 2013, Nanchoff was loaned to Swedish club Jönköpings Södra until November 27, 2013.

After splitting 2015 between the Portland Timbers first team and Portland Timbers 2, Nanchoff signed a one-year contract with an option for 2017 with the Tampa Bay Rowdies on January 8, 2016.

Nanchoff announced his retirement from professional soccer on February 28, 2019. Nanchoff joined the coaching staff at the University of Akron the same day.

== Personal ==
Both his father, George Nanchoff, and his uncle, Louis Nanchoff, played for Akron and later in the NASL. Both collected ten caps and scored a goal for the US national team.

== Honors ==
University of Akron

- NCAA Men's Division I Soccer Championship: 2010

Portland Timbers

- MLS Cup: 2015
- Western Conference (playoffs): 2015
- Western Conference (regular season): 2013
