= Eric Alexander (soccer) =

American soccer player

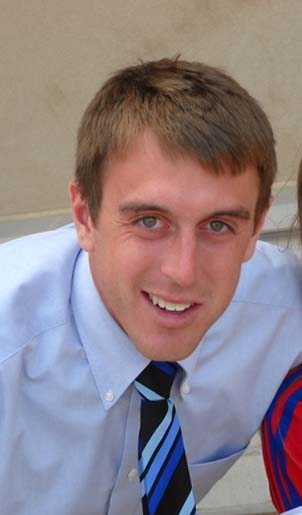

Personal information
- Full name: Eric Alexander
- Date of birth: April 14, 1988 (age 38)
- Place of birth: Portage, Michigan, US
- Height: 6 ft 1 in (1.85 m)
- Position: Midfielder

College career
Years	Team	Apps	(Gls)
2006–2009	Indiana Hoosiers		

Senior career*
Years	Team	Apps	(Gls)
2006	Kalamazoo Kingdom	8	(2)
2007	West Michigan Edge	12	(1)
2008–2009	Kalamazoo Outrage	17	(4)
2010–2011	FC Dallas	39	(2)
2011–2012	Portland Timbers	30	(0)
2013–2014	New York Red Bulls	68	(6)
2015–2016	Montreal Impact	32	(0)
2015	→ FC Montreal (loan)	1	(0)
2016–2018	Houston Dynamo	43	(1)
2017	→ Rio Grande Valley FC Toros (loan)	1	(0)
2019	FC Cincinnati	6	(0)
2019	FC Dallas	0	(0)
Total		257	(16)

International career^{‡}
2011–2014	United States	2	(0)
- * Club domestic league appearances and goals as of August 6, 2019 ‡ National team caps and goals as of February 2, 2014

Eric Alexander (born April 14, 1988) is an American former professional soccer player.

== Career ==
=== College and amateur ===
Alexander attended Portage Central High School, where he was named NSCAA/adidas Boys High School National Player of the Year and Gatorade National Boys Soccer Player of the Year in 2005, before playing college soccer for the Indiana University Hoosiers from 2006 to 2009. He was named to the Big Ten All-Freshman team in his first year, started all 22 matches and was named to the All-Big Ten first-team and the NSCAA/adidas Great Lakes All-Region second-team as a sophomore and a junior.

During his college years Alexander also played for Portage Soccer Club Kalamazoo Kingdom, West Michigan Edge and Kalamazoo Outrage in the USL Premier Development League.

=== Professional ===
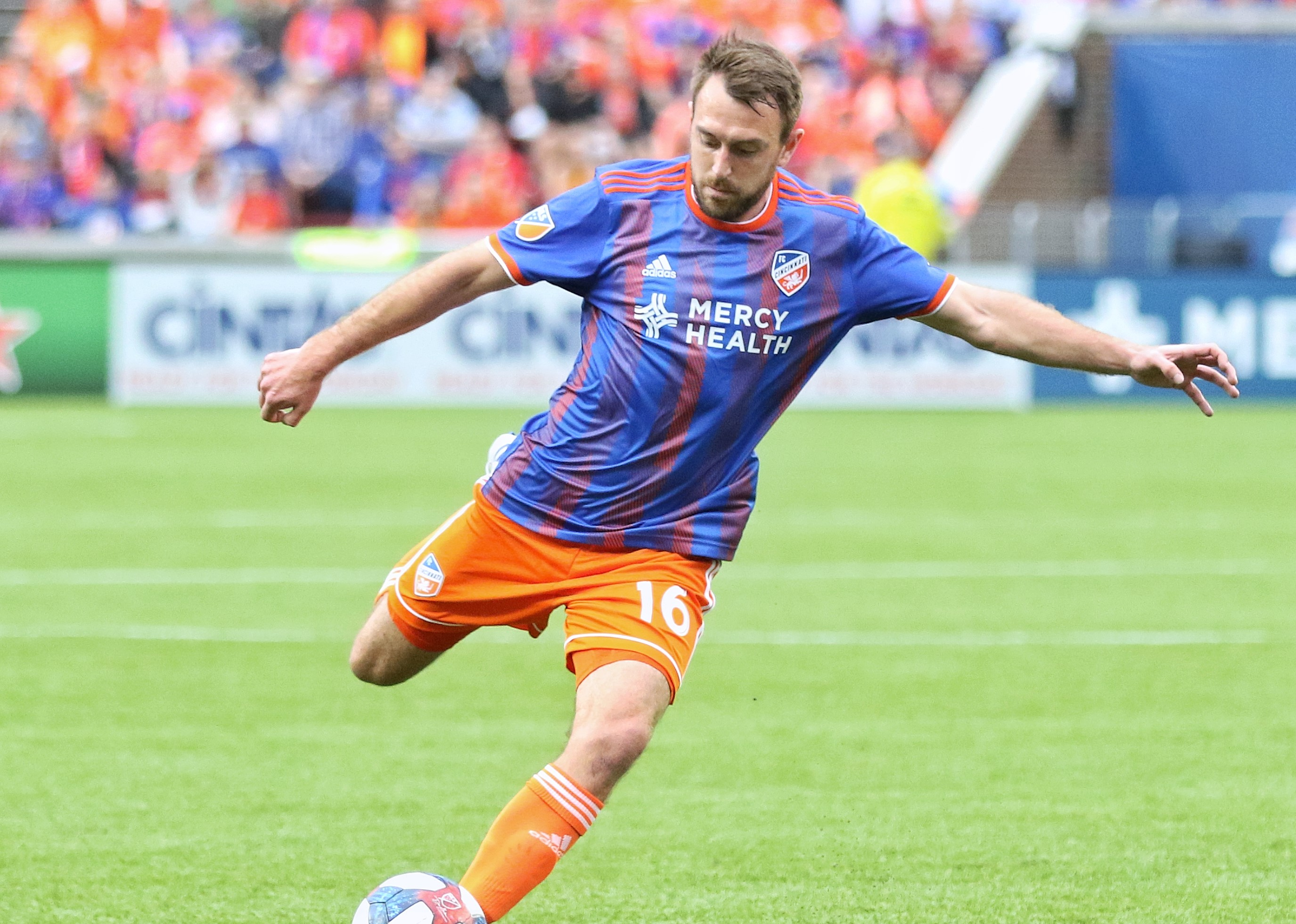
Eric Alexander playing for FC Cincinnati of Major League Soccer in 2019

Alexander was drafted in the third round (44th overall) of the 2010 MLS SuperDraft by FC Dallas. He made his professional debut on March 27, 2010, in Dallas's opening game of the 2010 MLS season against Houston Dynamo. After initially receiving limited time in his first season, Alexander started eleven consecutive matches to close the 2010 season and was a key player during FC Dallas' nineteen-game unbeaten streak. In all he would appear in 17 league matches scoring two goals and assisting on three.

Alexander was traded to Portland Timbers on August 19, 2011, after making 22 league appearances during the 2011 campaign for FC Dallas in exchange for Jeremy Hall. In his first full season in Portland, Alexander appeared in 24 league matches and recorded a team leading 6 assists.

On February 11, 2013, Alexander was traded to New York Red Bulls in exchange for allocation money. Alexander was an important player for New York in his first year at the club as he appeared in all 34 league matches and scored 4 goals, helping the club to its first major title the 2013 MLS Supporters' Shield. During the 2014 season Alexander once again appeared in all 34 league matches scoring 2 goals and assisting on 9 others.

On January 27, 2015, Alexander was traded to Montreal Impact alongside Ambroise Oyongo, an international player roster spot and allocation money for Felipe and the 1st pick in the MLS allocation ranking. After a season and a half with Montreal, Alexander was traded to the Houston Dynamo in exchange for general and targeted allocation money.

In his first year with the Dynamo, Alexander made only 10 appearances, 3 of them starts. In 2017 he helped the Dynamo make the playoffs for the first time in 3 seasons, however Alexander suffered a MCL sprain on May 6 that caused him to miss 4 months. He was able to return to action on September 23 against New York City FC. Alexander appeared in all 5 of the Dynamo playoff games that season and got an assist on Mauro Manotas's goal that put the Dynamo up 2–1 against his former club the Portland Timbers in the Western Conference Semi Finals.

Alexander was selected by FC Cincinnati in the 2018 MLS Expansion Draft.

On August 9, 2019, Alexander returned to FC Dallas following his release from Cincinnati two days previously. His FC Dallas contract expired at the end of 2019. Retired to finish college at Indiana University. Finishing MBA at Auburn University 2025

=== International ===
On December 21, 2010, Alexander was called up to the United States national team for a friendly game against Chile. He made his debut on January 22, 2011.

On January 3, 2014, he was again called up, this time as part of a 26-man roster that trained in Carson, California and São Paulo, Brazil as coach Jürgen Klinsmann prepared the side for the 2014 FIFA World Cup.

== Honors ==
FC Dallas

- Major League Soccer Western Conference Championship (1): 2010

New York Red Bulls

- MLS Supporters' Shield(1): 2013

Houston Dynamo

- US Open Cup(1): 2018

== Career statistics ==
=== Club ===
As of match played October 29, 2018

Appearances and goals by club, season and competition
Club	Season	League			Playoffs (Note: Includes MLS Cup Playoffs and USL PDL playoffs matches.)		Cup (Note: Includes U.S. Open Cup and Canadian Championship matches.)		Continental (Note: Includes CONCACAF Champions Leaguematches.)		Total	
Club	Season	Division	Apps	Goals	Apps	Goals	Apps	Goals	Apps	Goals	Apps	Goals
Kalamazoo Kingdom	2006	USL PDL	8	2	–		–		–		8	2
West Michigan Edge	2007	USL PDL	12	1	–		–		–		12	1
Kalamazoo Outrage	2008-09	USL PDL	17	4	–		–		–		17	4
FC Dallas	2010	MLS	17	2	2	0	–		–		19	2
FC Dallas	2011	MLS	22	0	–		2	0	3	0	27	0
FC Dallas	Total		39	2	2	0	2	0	3	0	46	2
Portland Timbers	2011	MLS	6	0	–		0	0	–		6	0
Portland Timbers	2012	MLS	24	0	–		1	0	–		25	0
Portland Timbers	Total		30	0	0	0	1	0	0	0	31	0
New York Red Bulls	2013	MLS	34	4	2	1	2	0	–		38	5
New York Red Bulls	2014	MLS	34	2	5	0	1	0	3	0	43	2
New York Red Bulls	Total		68	6	7	1	3	0	3	0	81	7
Montreal Impact	2015	MLS	20	0	0	0	3	0	0	0	23	0
Montreal Impact	2016	MLS	12	0	–		2	0	–		14	0
Montreal Impact	Total		32	0	0	0	5	0	0	0	37	0
FC Montreal (loan)	2015	USL	1	0	–		–		–		1	0
Houston Dynamo	2016	MLS	10	0	–		0	0	–		10	0
Houston Dynamo	2017	MLS	12	0	5	0	0	0	–		17	0
Houston Dynamo	2018	MLS	21	1	–		2	0	–		23	1
Houston Dynamo	Total		43	1	5	0	2	0	0	0	50	1
Rio Grande Valley Toros (loan)	2017	USL	1	0	–		–		–		1	0
Career Total			251	16	14	1	13	0	6	0	383	17
