= Cleveland Internationals =

American soccer team

- Full name: Cleveland Internationals Soccer
- Nickname: Internationals
- Founded: 2004
- Dissolved: 2010
- Ground: Pinnacle Sports Complex; Medina, Ohio
- Capacity: ????
- Owners: George Nanchoff; Louie Nanchoff; Zdravko Popovich
- Head Coach: George Nanchoff
- League: USL Premier Development League
- 2010: 9th, Great Lakes; Playoffs: DNQ
Home colors	Away colors

Cleveland Internationals was an American soccer team based in Cleveland, Ohio, United States. Founded in 2004, the team played in the USL Premier Development League (PDL), the fourth tier of the American Soccer Pyramid, in the Great Lakes Division of the Central Conference. The franchise folded at the end of the 2010 season and left the league thereafter.

The team played its home games at the Pinnacle Sports Complex in nearby Medina, Ohio. The team's colors were blue and white.

In addition to the PDL team, the Internationals had a sister club - Cleveland Internationals Women - in the USL W-League, as well as an entry in the Super Y-League.

== History ==
The Cleveland Internationals were first entered into the PDL in 2004 by George Nanchoff, a Yugoslavian ex-NASL player who now runs the Internationals Soccer Club, which was established in 1976 as an outlet for young Ohio players who had graduated from college but still had a desire to continue to play competitively.

The Internationals' first competitive season was a difficult one. Despite winning their first ever game 3-0 over Toledo Slayers (goals by Anthony DiBello, William Kletzien and John Sand) they only managed to pick up one more win all season (ironically also over Toledo), and suffered through several tough defeats, including a 5-0 drubbing at the hands of Michigan Bucks, a 5-1 loss to Indiana Invaders, and a 4-1 defeat by Kalamazoo Kingdom. By the end of the year the team was last in the Great Lakes Division, with just 7 points on the board, and 28 behind divisional champions Michigan Bucks.

2005 started more brightly for the Internationals, who began the year with two wins and a tie in their first three games. However, the sharp start proved to be something of a false dawn for the team, as from mid-June to mid-July the Internationals endured a 7-game winless streak that included a 4-0 drubbing by Kalamazoo Kingdom, and a heartbreaking 3-2 loss to Indiana Invaders, who scored two goals in injury time to register a come-from-behind win. A couple of late-season triumphs - 3-0 over Toledo Slayers and 2-1 over Fort Wayne Fever - provided a ray of sunshine in an otherwise rather bleak season, but they still finished the year 7th in the Great Lakes, 25 points behind divisional champs Chicago Fire Premier. William Kletzien was the Internationals' top scorer with 9 goals, while Chris Green and George Nanchoff himself contributed 4 assists each.

If 2005 was bad for the Internationals, 2006 was a disaster. Having failed to secure their usual home at St. Edward High School in Lakewood for the entire season, the team was forced to travel all over Ohio, and even as far as western Pennsylvania in search of a field to play on, and the lack of stability clearly influenced results. The team registered just a single victory all year - 4-2 over Kalamazoo Kingdom on the final day of the season, in front of just 53 fans - eventually ending with just six points, rock bottom of the Great Lakes for the second time in two years. The Internationals' defense was like an open door, conceding four or more goals on five different occasions, including a dismaying 5-0 thrashing by Chicago Fire Premier in July, and this was compounded by their lack of success in front of goal: top scorer Danny Bartulovic netted just four times all year.

2007 was an improvement for the Internationals, in that they picked up more wins and did not finish last in the division, but they remained one of the least effective teams in the entire Central Conference. Things started badly with a sequence of seven straight defeats at the beginning of the season, including a 5-0 lashing by Michigan Bucks in early June. However, July provided an unexpected turn in form, as the team rattled of five victories, including a comprehensive 3-1 home win over PDL new boys Toronto Lynx, and a hugely impressive 2-0 victory over traditional regional powerhouse Chicago Fire Premier at home on the last day of the regular season. Strikers Corey Sipos and Matt Tutich saw some success in the goal scoring stakes, netting 10 times between them, while Chris Korb led the team in assists.

2008 turned out to the best season in Internationals history; they started the season well, winning both their opening fixtures 3-0 over Cincinnati Kings and West Michigan Edge, and continued their impressive form pretty much throughout the year. They overcame new boys Kalamazoo Outrage 4-1 the first week in June (with all four goals being scored by Steve Zakuani), battered West Virginia Chaos 5-0, and took down Cincinnati again 5-1 at home, leaving the club on the verge of the playoffs for the first time in franchise history. Despite dropping points on the road in Kalamazoo at the end of June, the Internationals finished the season with a strong 6-game unbeaten streak which included a pair of 3-1 wins over Fort Wayne Fever and Indiana Invaders and a battling 3-3 tie with West Michigan Edge, and eventually finished second in the Great Lakes behind Michigan Bucks, and in the post season for the first time. They overcame Toronto Lynx in the play-in round off a late winner by Ben Zemanski, but were outplayed by eventual PDL champs Thunder Bay Chill in the Central Conference semi-final, losing 2-0 despite playing against 9 men for 45 minutes; nevertheless, Cleveland's season was by far their most successful, and is testament to head coach Nanchoff's longevity in the league. Justin Morrow and Steve Zakuani - the younger brother of English pro Gabriel Zakuani - were the team's top scorers, with 11 and 9 goals respectively, while Matt Tutich contributed 8 assists.

The Internationals did not fare as well in 2009, finishing sixth in the Great Lakes division, and out of the playoffs. Despite a convincing 2-0 win over Fort Wayne Fever in their second fixture, the Internationals lost four and tied two of their next six (including conceding a 90th-minute goal in a 3-2 loss to the Michigan Bucks) and were struggling to catch up with the league leaders halfway through the year. A 1-0 road win over high flying Kalamazoo Outrage off a 90th minute Yoram Mwila penalty kick briefly raised hopes of a resurgence, but the 4-1 loss to Forest City London in their vert next game brought the Cleveland team back down to earth with a bump. Their record was made a little more respectable with three wins in their last five regular season games, including a 4-1 hammering of Toronto Lynx that represented their biggest win of the season, but ultimately the peak in form was too little too late. Darlington Nagbe was Cleveland's top scorer, with 5 goals, while Chris Korb contributed three assists.

== Players ==
=== Final roster ===
This list is a historical record of the final group of players on the last Internationals roster for their final game in August 2010. Source:

Note: Flags indicate national team as defined under FIFA eligibility rules; some limited exceptions apply. Players may hold more than one non-FIFA nationality.

No.	Pos.	Nation	Player
0	GK	USA	Anthony Ponikvar
1	GK	USA	Brad Stuver
2	MF	USA	Mike Matlock
3	MF	USA	Brian Cothern
4	MF	USA	Shawn Gross
5	DF	USA	Cameron Jordan
6	DF	USA	Cameron Boyd
7	MF	USA	Martin Nesic
8	MF	ROU	Vlad Muresan
9	MF	USA	Matt Dagilis
10	FW	BIH	Admir Suljevic
11	FW	USA	Mike Mangotic
12	FW	USA	Josh Williams
13	DF	USA	Danny Mortemore
14	MF	USA	Dan Cooperider
15	FW	USA	Aaron Adkins

No.	Pos.	Nation	Player
16	MF	USA	Byron Kaverman
17	DF	USA	Nathaniel Milhoan
18	FW	USA	Stefan Ostergren
19	DF	USA	Sam Galloway
20	FW	USA	Steve Kane
21	MF	USA	Matt Horth
22	MF	USA	Jacob Naumann
23	MF	ENG	Rhys Cannella
24	DF	USA	Justin Kibler
29	FW	USA	Ryan Minick
30	DF	USA	Lucas Martorana
—	MF	USA	Carl Contrasciere
—	MF	BRA	Manuel Conde Fuentes
—	FW	USA	Patrick Murray
—	FW	USA	Darlington Nagbe
—	MF	ENG	Michael O'Neill

=== Notable former players ===
This list of notable former players comprises players who went on to play professional soccer after playing for the team in the Premier Development League, or those who previously played professionally before joining the team.

- (United States) Marc Burch
- (United States) Steve Gillespie
- (United States) Matt Horth
- (United States) Dustin Kirby
- (United States) Tony Labudovski
- (United States) Darlington Nagbe
- (United States) Michael Nanchoff
- (United States) Mark Nerkowski
- (United States) Brad Stuver
- (Bosnia and Herzegovina) Siniša Ubiparipović
- (Democratic Republic of the Congo) Steve Zakuani
- (United States) Ben Zemanski
- (United States) Josh Williams

== Year-by-year ==
Year	Division	League	Regular season	Playoffs	Open Cup
2004	4	USL PDL	7th, Great Lakes	Did not qualify	Did not qualify
2005	4	USL PDL	7th, Great Lakes	Did not qualify	Did not qualify
2006	4	USL PDL	7th, Great Lakes	Did not qualify	Did not qualify
2007	4	USL PDL	6th, Great Lakes	Did not qualify	Did not qualify
2008	4	USL PDL	2nd, Great Lakes	Conference Semifinals	Did not qualify
2009	4	USL PDL	6th, Great Lakes	Did not qualify	Did not qualify
2010	4	USL PDL	9th, Great Lakes	Did not qualify	Did not qualify

== Head coaches ==
- (United States) George Nanchoff (2005, 2009-2010)
- (United States) Tony Dore (2006-2008)

== Stadia ==
- Byers Field; Parma, Ohio (2004)
- Coughlin Field at St. Edward High School; Lakewood, Ohio (2005-2008)
- Stadium at St. Vincent - St. Mary High School; Akron, Ohio 1 game (2006)
- Medina Soccer Field; Medina, Ohio 1 game (2006)
- Stadium at Gannon University; Erie, Pennsylvania 1 game (2006)
- Krenzler Field at Cleveland State University; Cleveland, Ohio 1 game (2006)
- Valley Sports Center; Struthers, Ohio 1 game (2006)
- Don Shula Stadium at Wasmer Field, John Carroll University; University Heights, Ohio 3 games (2007-2008, 2010)
- Pinnacle Sports Complex; Medina, Ohio (2009-2010)

== Average attendance ==
Attendance stats are calculated by averaging each team's self-reported home attendances from the historical match archive at https://web.archive.org/web/20100105175057/http://www.uslsoccer.com/history/index_E.html

- 2004: 163
- 2005: 82
- 2006: 128
- 2007: 86
- 2008: 95
- 2009: 84
- 2010: 61
