= Andrew Wiedeman =

American soccer player (born 1989)

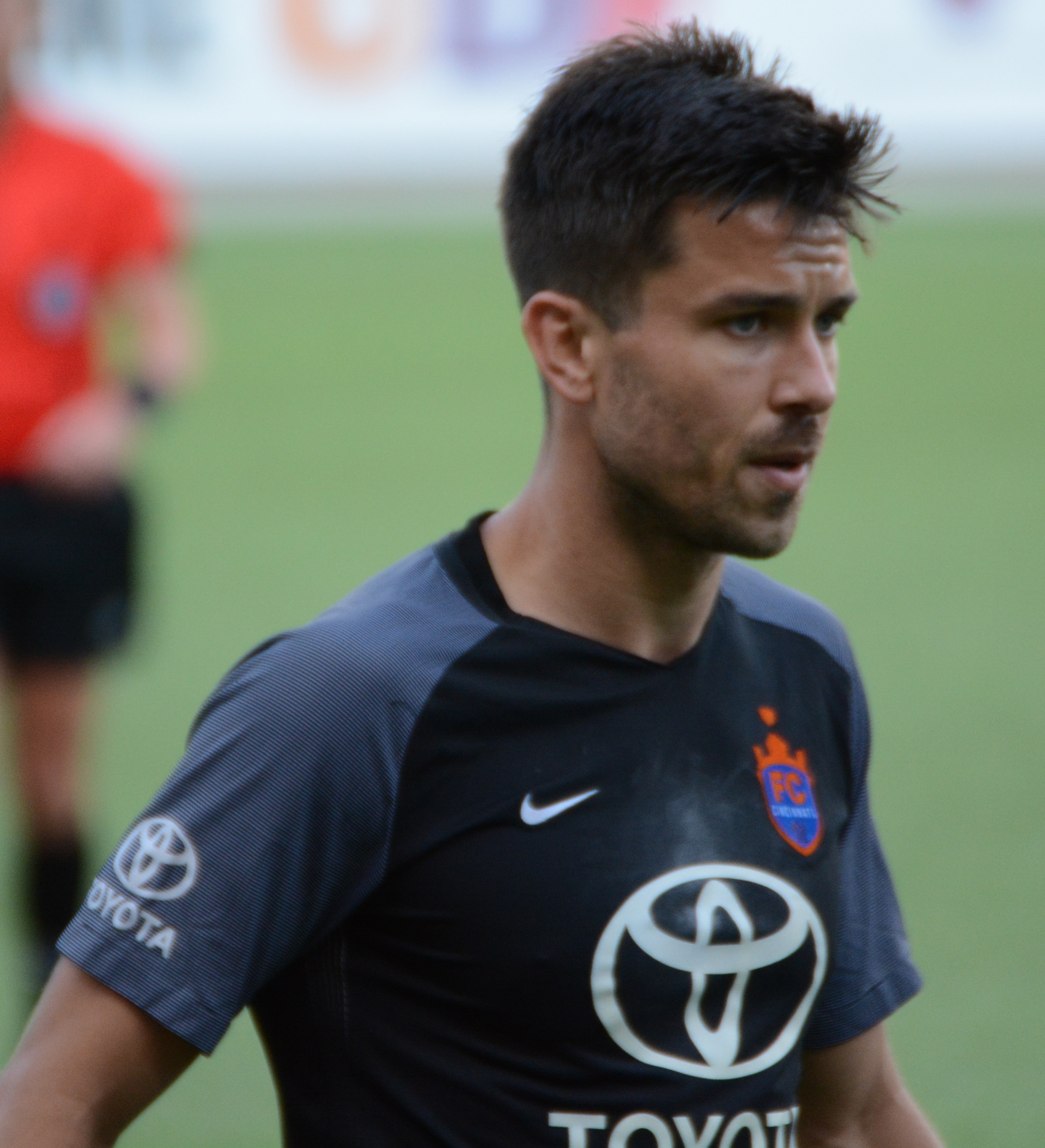
- Wiedeman playing with FC Cincinnati in 2017

Personal information
- Full name: Andrew Dennis Wiedeman
- Date of birth: August 22, 1989 (age 37)
- Place of birth: San Ramon, California, U.S.
- Height: 5 ft 11 in (1.80 m)
- Position: Forward

College career
Years	Team	Apps	(Gls)
2007–2009	California Golden Bears	59	(30)

Senior career*
Years	Team	Apps	(Gls)
2008	San Jose Frogs	12	(6)
2009	NorCal Lamorinda United		
2010–2012	FC Dallas	8	(0)
2012–2014	Toronto FC	36	(4)
2015	Ottawa Fury	22	(4)
2016–2017	FC Cincinnati	59	(9)
Total		137	(23)

International career
2007	United States U18	4	(1)
- * Club domestic league appearances and goals

Andrew Dennis Wiedeman (born August 22, 1989) is an American former professional soccer player, who played as a forward.

== Career ==
=== College and amateur ===
Wiedeman played college soccer at the University of California, where he earned numerous individual honors, including NSCAA Far West All-Region and All-Pac-10 first teams in 2009 and NSCAA third-team All-American, All-Pac-10 first-team selection, Top Drawer Soccer's Team of the Season, NSCAA Far West All-Region first team and Pac-10 all-academic second-team selection in 2008. He left college early to enter the 2010 MLS SuperDraft as a Generation Adidas player.

During his college years Wiedeman also played with San Jose Frogs in the USL Premier Development League during the 2008 season and NorCal Lamorinda United in the National Premier Soccer League during the 2009 season. Wiedeman was also a four-year starter for the California High School Fighting Grizzlies, earning all-East Bay Athletic League Honors his Junior year. Wiedeman holds an Irish passport through descent.

=== Professional ===
Wiedeman was drafted in the second round (21st overall) of the 2010 MLS SuperDraft by FC Dallas. He made his professional debut on April 28, 2010, in US Open Cup game against D.C. United.

Wiedeman was traded to Toronto FC in exchange for Julian de Guzman on July 13, 2012.

In Toronto, he rejoined former FC Dallas teammate and fellow Californian Eric Avila. He made his debut for the club a day later coming on as a substitute for Danny Koevermans, who exited with an injury, in the 41st minute. Toronto FC went on to win that game 1–0 against the New England Revolution.

He scored his first professional goal in only his second appearance for Toronto FC on July 18, 2012, coming on as a substitute for Eric Avila in the 59th minute of a home game against the Colorado Rapids and scoring the game-winning goal in the 67th minute of play, off a deflected shot from teammate Luis Silva, to earn Toronto a 2–1 victory.

Wiedeman was signed by Ottawa Fury FC of the North American Soccer League on January 26, 2015. He would score his first and second goals for the club in a 4–1 win over Indy Eleven on August 8, 2015.

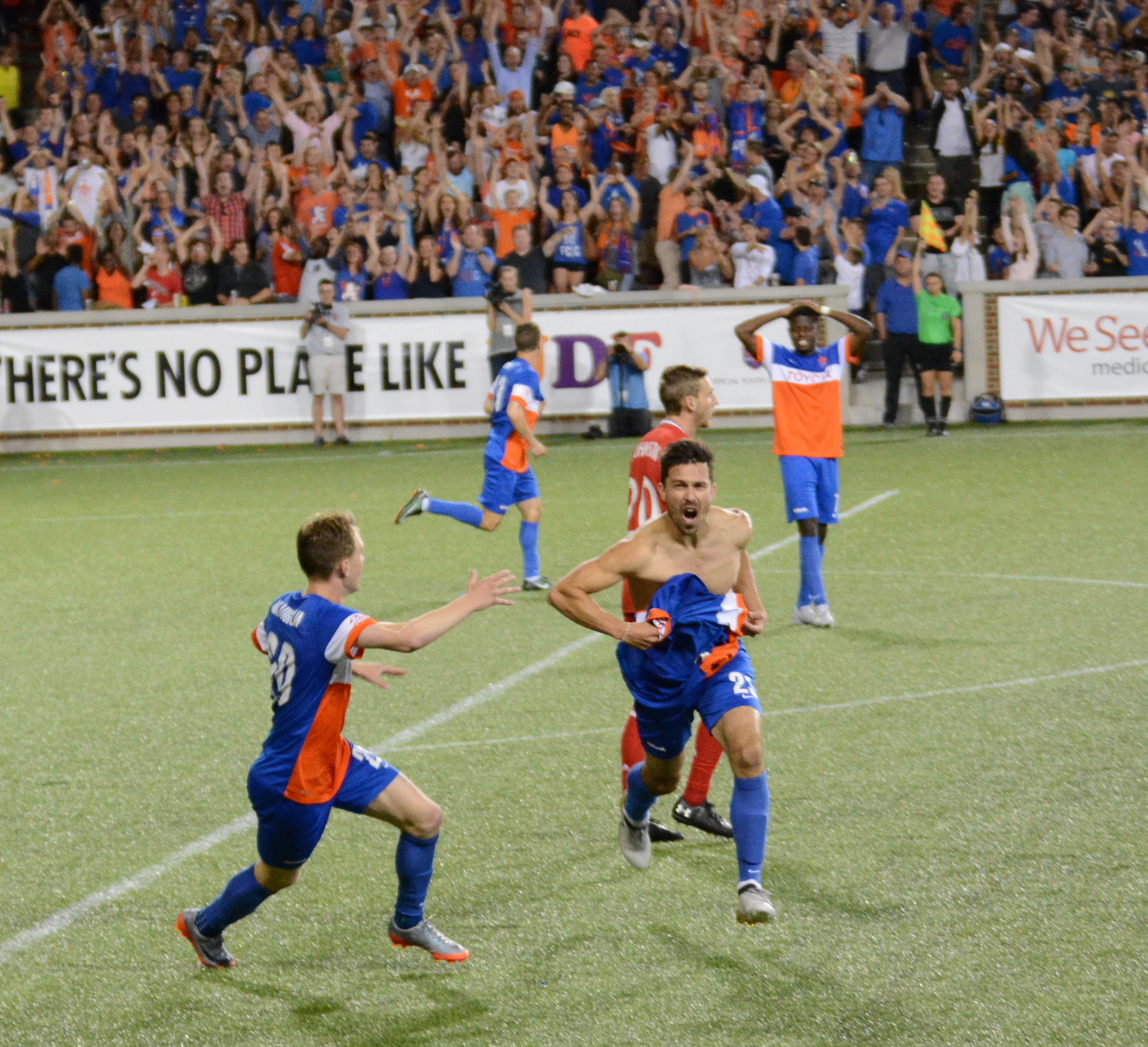
Wiedeman celebrates after scoring a goal in the 2017 U.S. Open Cup, unaware of the linesman behind him signaling that he was offside.

On December 7, 2015, Wiedeman was announced as one of the first 11 signings for USL expansion club FC Cincinnati.

Following the end of the 2017 season at FC Cincinnati, Wiedeman retired from professional soccer to pursue a bachelor's degree at the University of California, Berkeley.

Wiedeman played in the inaugural edition of The Soccer Tournament. Wiedeman played for Nati SC, a team composed for FC Cincinnati alumni.
