= Conrad Earnest =

American soccer player and exercise physiologist (born 1957)

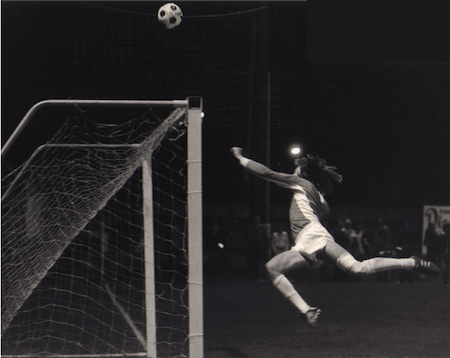

Personal information
- Full name: Conrad P. Earnest
- Date of birth: December 20, 1957 (age 68)
- Place of birth: Woodstock, New York, U.S.
- Height: 6 ft 0 in (1.83 m)
- Position: Goalkeeper

College career
Years	Team	Apps	(Gls)
- Ulster Senators
- Akron Zips

Senior career*
Years	Team	Apps	(Gls)
1979	New York Eagles		
1981	Cleveland Cobras		
- * Club domestic league appearances and goals

Conrad Earnest (born December 20, 1957) is an American retired soccer goalkeeper and an exercise physiologist. He spent two seasons in the American Soccer League.

== Career ==
Earnest began playing soccer at the age of 16. Within two years he earned high school All New York State/All-American status. He began playing collegiate soccer at Ulster County Community College winning the Junior College National Championship in his second year. Earnest then attended the University of Akron. During his time at Akron, Earnest was twice awarded NCAA Division I player of the week honors.

Following college, he played in the American Soccer League with the New York Eagles and the Cleveland Cobras. He later returned to the University of Akron where he earned his master's degree in exercise science. He completed his education after receiving a Ph.D.in Exercise Physiology from Texas Woman's University. After working for several years at the Cooper Institute in Dallas, Texas, he became the Director of Exercise Biology at the Pennington Biomedical Research Center in Baton Rouge, Louisiana.

Overall, the focus of his scientific research centers on the benefits of exercise in clinical patients at risk for or present with various metabolic diseases. In addition, he has published a variety of studies examining the use of nutritional supplements aimed at improving sports performance, as well as different health outcomes. With respect to the high performance athlete, Earnest has published several notable papers with colleagues from Spain examining the physiologic characteristics of professional cyclists competing in the three-week Grand Tours of cycling: The Tour de France, Giro d'Italia, and the Vuelta a España.
