= 2016 MAC men's soccer tournament =

Tournament details
- Country: United States
- Teams: 4

Final positions
- Champions: Akron Zips
- Runners-up: Buffalo Bulls

Tournament statistics
- Matches played: 3
- Goals scored: 9 (3 per match)
- Top goal scorer(s): 9 players, 1 goal each

The 2016 Mid-American Conference men's soccer tournament was the 23rd edition of the tournament. It determined the Mid-American Conference's automatic berth into the 2016 NCAA Division I Men's Soccer Championship.

== Qualification ==
2016 Mid-American Conference men's soccer standings
	Conf.					Overall
Team	W		L		T	W		L		T
No. 24 Akron ‡	3	–	1	–	1	13	–	6	–	3
Bowling Green	2	–	0	–	3	9	–	6	–	4
Buffalo	2	–	1	–	2	12	–	4	–	3
Western Michigan	1	–	1	–	3	9	–	6	–	4
Northern Illinois	1	–	3	–	1	2	–	10	–	4
West Virginia	1	–	4	–	0	8	–	7	–	1
‡-Tournament Champion +-Invited to the 2016 NCAA Tournament; As of 13 December 2016; Rankings from NSCAA

The top four teams in the Mid-American Conference based on their conference regular season records qualified for the tournament. Akron, Bowling Green, Buffalo, and Western Michigan earned berths into the tournament.

== Bracket ==
Semifinals
1	Akron	4
4	Western Michigan	0
2	Bowling Green	1
3	Buffalo (OT)	2

Final
1	Akron	2
3	Buffalo	1

== Schedule ==
=== Semi-finals ===
November 11, 2016	Bowling Green	1–2 (a.e.t.)	Buffalo	Akron, Ohio
4:00 PM ET	Roth 57'	Report	Fogarty-Cameron 49'; Enstrom 94'	Stadium: FirstEnergy Stadium; Attendance: 0 Referee: Brandon Artis

November 11, 2016	Akron	4–0	Western Michigan	Akron, Ohio
7:00 PM ET	Holthusen 23'; Gainford 35' (pen.); Zajac 51'; Kahsay 59'	Report		Stadium: FirstEnergy Stadium; Attendance: 1,509; Referee: Dimitar Chavdarov

=== MAC Championship ===
November 13, 2016	Akron	2–1	Buffalo	Akron, Ohio
1:00 PM ET	Hinds 32', 53'	Report	Cicerone 62'	Stadium: FirstEnergy Stadium; Attendance: 1,428; Referee: Sorin Stoica

== Statistical leaders ==
=== Top goalscorers ===
9 goals scored by 9 players.

== Tournament Best XI ==
Nick Hinds, Akron

Stuart Holthusen, Akron

Adam Najem, Akron

Brad Ruhakk, Akron

Jacob Roth, Bowling Green

Pat Flynn, Bowling Green

Joseph Kuta, Buffalo

Fox Slotemaker, Buffalo

Russell Cicerone, Buffalo

Edu jimenez, Western Michigan

Hunter Vandenboom, Western Michigan
