= Justin Sadler =

American soccer player

Personal information
- Full name: Justin Sadler
- Date of birth: October 29, 1982 (age 44)
- Place of birth: Harrisburg, Pennsylvania, United States
- Height: 5 ft 9 in (1.75 m)
- Position: Midfielder

College career
Years	Team	Apps	(Gls)
2001–2004	Drexel Dragons		
2005	Akron Zips	23	(3)

Senior career*
Years	Team	Apps	(Gls)
2003–2004	South Jersey Barons		
2006	Harrisburg City Islanders	15	(1)
- * Club domestic league appearances and goals as of November 30, 2006

Justin Sadler (born October 29, 1982, in Harrisburg, Pennsylvania), is a U.S. soccer midfielder who last played for USL Second Division side Harrisburg City Islanders.

== Youth ==
Sadler attended Cumberland Valley High School where he was a high school All American soccer player in 2000. He then entered Drexel University where he was the team's freshman of the year in 2001. At some point, he transferred to the University of Akron where he finished his collegiate soccer career.

== Professional ==
In 2003 and 2004, Sadler played for the amateur South Jersey Barons. On March 8, 2006, the St. Louis Steamers of the Major Indoor Soccer League selected Sadler in the third round of the MISL College Draft. However, the team folded before the 2006–2007 season and the Detroit Ignition picked up Sadler in the Dispersal Draft. That summer, he spent the season with the Harrisburg City Islanders of the USL Second Division and does not appear to have played for the Ignition at any time.
