= Soisson-Rapacz-Clason Field =

Multipurpose stadium in Michigan

- Mayor's Riverfront Stadium
- Interactive map of Soisson-Rapacz-Clason Field
- Location: 251 Mills Street; Kalamazoo, MI 49048
- Coordinates: 42.291598°N 85.56537°W
- Capacity: 2,200

Tenants
- Kalamazoo Christian Comets; Hackett Catholic Fighting Irish; Kalamazoo Kingdom (PDL) (2003–2006); Kalamazoo Outrage (PDL) (2008); Kalamazoo FC (USL2) (2016–present)

Soisson-Rapacz-Clason Field, in Kalamazoo, Michigan, is a 2,200 seat multipurpose stadium. Its primary tenants are Kalamazoo Christian High School, Hackett Catholic Central High School and Kalamazoo FC of USL League Two. They also hosted the Kalamazoo Outrage, a soccer team playing in the USL Premier Development League from 2007 to 2010.

Soisson-Rapacz Field was also home to the Kalamazoo Lassies of the All-American Girls Professional Baseball League from 1950-1954. The Lassies were one of the more popular teams in the AAGPBL, routinely drawing crowds of over 1,000 spectators. They won the League championship in 1954, the last year of the AAGPBL.
