= 2018 MAC men's soccer tournament =

- Classification: Division I
- Teams: 6
- Matches: 5
- Semifinals site: Dick Dlesk Soccer Stadium; Morgantown, West Virginia
- Finals site: Dick Dlesk Soccer Stadium; Morgantown, West Virginia
- Champions: Akron (15th title)
- Winning coach: Jared Embick (6th title)
- MVP: Marcel Zajac (Akron)
- Broadcast: ESPN+
MAC men's soccer tournament
«2017	2019»

2018 Mid-American Conference men's soccer standings
	Conf.					Overall
Team	W		L		T	W		L		T
No. 22 West Virginia +	5	–	0	–	0	14	–	7	–	0
Bowling Green	2	–	1	–	2	6	–	7	–	4
Western Michigan	1	–	1	–	2	11	–	6	–	3
No. 2 Akron ‡	1	–	2	–	1	15	–	7	–	2
SIU Edwardsville	1	–	3	–	1	9	–	5	–	4
Northern Illinois	1	–	4	–	0	8	–	9	–	1
‡ – 2018 MAC Tournament champion + – Invited to the 2018 NCAA Division I Men's Soccer Championship; As of December 11, 2018; Rankings from United Soccer Coaches

The 2018 MAC men's soccer tournament, was the 25th edition of the tournament. It determined the Mid-American Conference's automatic berth into the 2018 NCAA Division I Men's Soccer Championship. The tournament began on November 6 and concluded on November 11.

Akron won the MAC Championship, 3–0 against Western Michigan, making it a rematch of last year's championship. Akron entered the tournament as the six-time defending champions, and the fourth overall seed.

The tournament was expanded this year from four teams to six teams.

== Seeds ==
Seed	School	Conference	Tiebreaker
1	West Virginia	5–0–0	
2	Bowling Green	2–2–1	
3	Western Michigan	1–1–2	
4	Akron	1–2–1	
5	SIU Edwardsville	1–3–1	
6	Northern Illinois	1–4–0	

== Bracket ==
First round Nov. 6
4	Akron	2
5	SIU Edwardsville	1
3	Western Michigan	3
6	Northern Illinois	1

Semifinals; Nov. 9
1	West Virginia	1
4	Akron	3
2	Bowling Green	0
3	Western Michigan	2

Final; Nov. 11
4	Akron	3
3	Western Michigan	0

== Results ==
=== First round ===
November 6
2:30 p.m. EST

No. 3 Western Michigan	3–1	No. 6 Northern Illinois
Sipple 20'; Jackman 30'; Clark 33'	Report	Maertins 14'

WMU Soccer Complex, Kalamazoo
Attendance: 315

November 6
4:00 p.m. EST

No. 4 Akron	2–1	No. 5 SIU Edwardsville
Hackworth 8'; Zajac 33'	Report	Solawa 18'

Cub Cadet Field, Akron
Attendance: 360
Referee: Nikola Aleksic

=== Semifinals ===
November 9
2:30 p.m. EST

No. 2 Bowling Green	0–2	No. 3 Western Michigan
	Report	Melaragni 5'; Shane 43'

Dlesk Stadium, Morgantown
Attendance: 0
Referee: Art Arustamyan

November 9
5:40 p.m. EST

No. 1 West Virginia	1–3	No. 4 Akron
Albino 1'	Report	Ritaccio 2', 66'; Kahsay 43'

Dlesk Stadium, Morgantown
Attendance: 250
Referee: Nicholas Balcer

=== Final ===
November 11
1:00 p.m. EST

No. 3 Western Michigan	0–3	No. 4 Akron
	Report	Egbo 65'; Zajac 85', 88'

Dlesk Stadium, Morgantown
Attendance: 94
Referee: Gregory Dopka

== Statistics ==
=== Top goalscorers ===
3 Goals

- (Canada) Marcel Zajac – Akron

2 Goals

- (Italy) Carlo Ritaccio – Akron

1 Goal

- (Nigeria) David Egbo – Akron
- (United States) Morgan Hackworth – Akron
- (Eritrea) Ezana Kahsay – Akron
- (Germany) Jan Maertins – Northern Illinois
- (United States) Greg Solawa – SIU Edwardsville
- (Spain) Andres Muriel Albino – West Virginia
- (United States) Tommy Clark – Western Michigan
- (United States) Caden Jackman – Western Michigan
- (United States) Mike Melaragni – Western Michigan
- (United States) Zack Shane – Western Michigan
- (United States) Cameron Sipple – Western Michigan

== All Tournament Team ==
**2018 MAC Men's Soccer All-Tournament team**

Carlo Ritaccio, Akron
Ezana Kahsay, Akron
**Marcel Zajac, Akron**
Abdi Mohaned, Akron
Moe Mustafa, Bowling Green
Charlie Maciejewski, Bowling Green
Logan Lucas, West Virginia
Sebastian Garcia-Herreros, West Virginia
Ben Thornton, Western Michigan
Jake Rufe, Western Michigan
Anthony Bowie, Western Michigan

MVP in **Bold**
