= NorCal Lamorinda United SC =

- Full name: NorCal Lamorinda United Soccer Club
- Founded: 2009
- Dissolved: 2009
- Ground: Miramonte High School
- League: National Premier Soccer League
- 2009: Regular Season: 2nd, Western; Playoffs: Divisional Finals
Home colors	Away colors

NorCal Lamorinda United SC was an American soccer team based in Orinda, California, United States. Founded in 2009, the team played in the National Premier Soccer League (NPSL) for a single season before disssolving. The team played its home games in the stadium on the campus of Miramonte High School. The team's colors were red, white and blue.

== Players ==
=== Final roster ===
Note: Flags indicate national team as defined under FIFA eligibility rules; some limited exceptions apply. Players may hold more than one non-FIFA nationality.

No.	Pos.	Nation	Player
0	GK	USA	Derek Leslie
1	GK	USA	David Bingham
2	DF	GER	Stefan Clemens
4	MF	USA	Dylan Leslie
5	DF	SDN	Mohamed Fofana
6	FW	PER	Manuel Vasquez
7	MF	BRA	Pedro Osorio
8	FW	USA	Yousef Samy
9	FW	ARG	Javier Ayala-Hill
12	DF	USA	Dylan Kiyomura
13	DF	USA	Evan Sassano
15	DF	USA	Nick Murphy
16	DF	USA	Ryan Lucas

No.	Pos.	Nation	Player
18	MF	USA	Jasko Begovic
20	FW	USA	Andrew Wiedeman
21	MF	MEX	Ricky Dorrego
—	DF	USA	Victor Cortez
—	MF	USA	Jeff Cosgriff
—	DF	USA	Joseph De Venuta
—	DF	LBR	Boyah Kaar
—	FW	USA	Jordan Keyes
—	DF	USA	Oscar Monjaras
—	DF	USA	Benno Nagel
—	FW	USA	Billal Samy
—	FW	USA	Daniel Walker

== Stadium ==
- Miramonte High School; Orinda, California (2009)
