= Yousef Samy =

Afghan-American footballer (born 1985)

Personal information
- Full name: Mohammed Yousef Samy
- Date of birth: 4 November 1985 (age 40)
- Place of birth: United States
- Position: Defender

College career
Years	Team	Apps	(Gls)
2006–2007	San Jose State Spartans	20	(0)
2008	Saint Mary's Gaels	15	(6)

Senior career*
Years	Team	Apps	(Gls)
2008	San Francisco Seals	13	(0)
2011–2012	Bay Area Ambassadors		

International career
2007–2011	Afghanistan	3	(0)
- * Club domestic league appearances and goals

Mohammed Yousef Samy (born 4 November 1985) is a former soccer player who played as a defender. Born in the United States, he was an Afghanistan international.

== Career ==
Samy started his career with American fourth tier side San Francisco Seals.
