= Stu Riddle =

New Zealand footballer

Personal information
- Full name: Stuart Riddle
- Date of birth: 23 May 1976 (age 50)
- Place of birth: Luton, England
- Height: 5 ft 11 in (1.80 m)
- Position: Striker

Youth career
- 1991–1992: Tawa AFC
- Wellington United

College career
| Years | Team | Apps | (Gls) |
| 1997–1998 | Coastal Carolina Chanticleers | | |

Senior career*
| Years | Team | Apps | (Gls) |
| 1995 | Wellington United | 18 | (18) |
| 1996 | Chelmsford City | 4 | (1) |
| 1996 | Miramar Rangers | 6 | (1) |
| 1997 | Western Suburbs | 6 | (3) |
| 1997 | Tawa | 11 | (7) |
| 1999 | Nelson Suburbs | 15 | (18) |
| 1999–2000 | Football Kingz | 9 | (2) |
| 2001–2002 | Des Moines Menace | 41 | (23) |
| 2001 | Oxford City | 2 | (1) |
| 2001 | Greenock Morton | 4 | (0) |
| 2004 | West Michigan Edge | 18 | (9) |
| 2004 | YoungHeart Manawatu | 5 | (1) |
| 2005 | Altona Magic | 7 | (4) |
| 2006 | Kalamazoo Kingdom | 14 | (6) |
| 2008 | Kalamazoo Outrage | 1 | (4) |
| Total | | 196 | (111) |

International career^{‡}
| 1996 | New Zealand U-23 | 4 | (0) |

Managerial career
- 1999: Coastal Carolina Chanticleers (Asst.)
- 2002–2004: Southern Indiana Screaming Eagles (Asst.)
- 2005–2006: Evansville Purple Aces (Asst.)
- 2006: Kalamazoo Kingdom
- 2008: Kalamazoo Outrage
- 2008: Fairfield Stags (Asst.)
- 2009–2012: Western Michigan Broncos
- 2013–2016: Buffalo Bulls
- 2017–2021: Northern Kentucky Norse
- 2024: Bowling Green State Falcons (Asst.)
- 2025: Midway University
- * Club domestic league appearances and goals as of 26 August 2008 ‡ National team caps and goals as of 26 August 2008

Stu Riddle (born 23 May 1976) is a former footballer who played as a striker. He is currently the head men's soccer coach at Midway University and was formerly the head coach of the men's soccer team at Western Michigan University, University at Buffalo, and Northern Kentucky University.

== Playing career ==
Riddle went to Wellington's Scots College. Riddle played for Wellington United in the New Zealand Superclub competition.

At the age of 19, Riddle was the youngest member of Bobby Clark's 1996 New Zealand Olympic Team, where he made four appearances including one as a substitute, in a 1–0 victory over then Oceania rivals Australia.

After brief stints with several clubs including Chelmsford City in the UK, Riddle turned to the US college system and spent two years with the Myrtle Beach-based Coastal Carolina University before being signed by Kiwi football icon Wynton Rufer for the Kingz debut season in the National Soccer League in 1999.

Although he signed a two-year contract, Riddle struggled to regularly feature in the Kingz side and only managed nine appearances with a return of two goals, both of which came away from home against Adelaide United and Brisbane Strikers.

Better form would be found in the lower United States leagues with Riddle being a mainstay of the Laurie Calloway-coached Des Moines Menace side that would achieve an undefeated season in the 2002 USL Premier Development League competition.

Riddle turned to the UK again in the hope of being signed by a Football League side but again struggled with the higher level of play and had short spells at Oxford City and Greenock Morton before being reunited with former Kingz teammates Marcus Stergiopoulos and Levent Osman at the Melbourne-based Altona Magic in the Victorian Premier League.

He fell out of favour with the management of the Macedonian flavoured club and returned to the United States.

== Management career ==
In 2006, he became a coach in the United Soccer Leagues when he accepted a player-coaching job with Kalamazoo Kingdom in the USL Premier Development League, United States elite development league.

In 2008, he served as the head coach for the Kalamazoo Outrage in the USL Premier Development League, United States elite development league team in the franchise's inaugural year. On 13 July 2008 the Kalamazoo Outrage qualified for the 2008 USL Premier Development League playoffs in their inaugural year.

Riddle guided his side to second place in the Central Conferences Midwest Division narrowly finishing behind the Chicago Fire Premier in the regular season standings. His side would get their revenge eliminating the Chicago Fire Premier from the 2008 playoffs by virtue of a 2–0 victory at Toyota Park on 22 July.

The teams run would continue under Riddle and they defeated perennial USL Premier Development League powerhouse the Michigan Bucks on 26 July to advance to the national quarter finals where the Thunder Bay Chill would end the Outrage's season.

Riddle became the sixth head coach of Western Michigan University when he was named the men's soccer coach on 30 January 2009. With this announcement he became the first New Zealander to be a head men's soccer coach at the National Collegiate Athletic Association (NCAA) Division I level.

Riddle coached at the University at Buffalo for four seasons where he compiled a record of 28-32-13. In his final two seasons as head coach, he guided the Bulls to the MAC championship, falling short both times.

He was hired as the 4th coach in Northern Kentucky University men's soccer program history. He led the Norse to an overall record of 37-36-5 during his 5 seasons at the helm of the program. This included a Horizon League Regular Season Championship and being named Horizon League Coach of the Year. Coach Riddle resigned as head coach of the Norse in December 2021.

== Personal ==
Riddle earned his master's degree in public service administration from the University of Evansville in 2007 while serving as an assistant coach for the Purple Aces.
