= Kalamazoo Outrage =

- Full name: Kalamazoo Outrage
- Nickname: Outrage
- Founded: 2007
- Dissolved: 2010
- Ground: Loy Norrix High School; Kalamazoo, Michigan
- Capacity: 500
- Owner: (United States) TKO Premier Soccer Club
- Head Coach: (United States) Chris Adrian
- League: USL Premier Development League
- 2010: 8th, Great Lakes; Playoffs: DNQ
Home colors	Away colors

Kalamazoo Outrage was an American soccer team based in Kalamazoo, Michigan, United States. Founded in 2007, the team played in the USL Premier Development League (PDL), the fourth tier of the American Soccer Pyramid. The franchise folded at the end of the 2010 season and left the league thereafter.

The team played its home games in the stadium on the campus of Loy Norrix High School, where they had played since 2009. The team's colors were blue and white.

The team had a sister organization, the Kalamazoo Outrage Women, who played in the women's USL W-League, and also fielded a team in the USL’s Super-20 League, a league for players 17 to 20 years of age run under the United Soccer Leagues umbrella.

Outrage were not affiliated with the Kalamazoo Kingdom soccer club, which competed in the PDL for many years until 2006, although Outrage's original head coach, Stu Riddle, was the head coach of Kingdom during its last competitive season.

== History ==
Kalamazoo Outrage's entry into the PDL was announced in late 2007, just as that season's competition was ending. The club is part of the larger Kalamazoo TKO organization, which has runs men, women's and junior teams in the greater Kalamazoo area for many years. The acronym TKO apparently has no official meaning – it was first coined by a former coach, Paul Wolpert, when he was 11 years old and was part of a group of local Michigan AYSO players who participated in the Adidas Domino's Pizza Soccer Tournament in Lansing, Michigan and called themselves The Kalamazoo Outfit, or TKO for short. Since then, TKO has been used as an acronym for Technical Knock-Out, and even The Killer Oranges, both of which are listed as being correct on the official TKO website.

On November 14, 2007, the club announced a player development deal with one of England's oldest soccer teams, Sheffield Wednesday, who have a history of working with American players (former USA international team player John Harkes played successfully with the Owls in the 1990s, and current international Frank Simek is their current first-choice right-back). The Owls further cemented their link with the Outrage on April 16, 2008, when the Wednesday Academy sent midfielder Scott Ellis to play with Outrage for the 2008 season, the player having impressed head coach Stu Riddle during their educational trip to Wednesday's Middlewood Road training ground in early 2008.

On May 13, 2008 the Outrage took part in the Old Burdicks Challenge Cup, in which they defeated perennial PDL powerhouse Michigan Bucks in their first ever official match. The match, which was dubbed the "Battle of Michigan", was settled on penalty kicks, with the Outrage emerging as 5–4 victors. The scores were locked at 1–1 after 90 minutes with former Plymouth Argyle schoolboy Dan Bulley scoring the Outrage's first ever goal. Striker Chase Corricelli scored the winning penalty kick.

Outrage's first weeks in PDL competition were extremely positive: after tying 0–0 with West Virginia Chaos in their opening game, they proceeded to win three of their next four matches, including a comprehensive 4–0 win over 9-man Indiana Invaders, and a 3–2 victory on the return fixture against West Virginia. An unexpected 4–1 defeat at the hands of Cleveland Internationals at the beginning of June notwithstanding, Outrage's impressive form continued through the middle of the summer; three back-to-back wins over Cincinnati Kings, West Michigan Edge and Fort Wayne Fever kept them well in the hunt for the playoffs. A couple of stutters in the run-in, including two home defeats to Indiana and Michigan Bucks, briefly raised the heart rate in Kalamazoo, but a playoff spot was secured following their 5–2 home victory against West Michigan Edge, which featured a hat trick from midfielder Mark Briggs. Outrage entered the playoffs having suffered a 2–1 final day defeat, again to Michigan, but impressively overcame Chicago Fire Premier 2–0 in the divisional round to take their place in the Central Conference tournament in Pontiac, Michigan. Against the run of form, Kalamazoo dispatched hot favorites Michigan Bucks 3–1 in their semi final, following a late equalizer from Tom Oatley and two goals in extra time. Despite being beaten 4–0 by eventual national champions Thunder Bay Chill in the Central Conference final, Kalamazoo's impressive debut season bodes well for the future. Mark Briggs was the team's top scorer, with 6 goals. It is also worth nothing that Kalamazoo striker Troy Mellanson played for the Antiguan national team in two of its qualifying games for the 2010 World Cup against Cuba on 17 June 2008, and 22 June 2008.

On September 1, 2010, Outrage announced that they were ceasing operations and would not compete in PDL or W League play in 2011.

== Players ==
=== Notable former players ===
This list of notable former players comprises players who went on to play or work in professional soccer after playing for the team in the Premier Development League, or those who previously played professionally before joining the team.

- (Brazil) Rafa Arlen
- (Brazil) Marcelo Lima
- (United States) Eric Alexander
- (England) Mark Briggs
- (England) Scott Ellis
- (Antigua and Barbuda) Troy Mellanson
- (New Zealand) Stu Riddle
- (United States) Mitch Hildebrandt

== Year-by-year ==
Year	Division	League	Regular season	Playoffs	Open Cup
2008	4	USL PDL	2nd, Midwest	Conference Finals	Did not qualify
2009	4	USL PDL	1st, Great Lakes	Divisional Finals	Did not qualify
2010	4	USL PDL	8th, Great Lakes	Did not qualify	Did not qualify

== Honors ==
- USL PDL Great Lakes Division Champions 2009

== Head coaches ==
- (New Zealand) Stu Riddle (2008)
- (England) Mark Spooner (2009)
- (United States) Chris Adrian (2010)

== Stadia ==
- Mayors Riverfront Stadium; Kalamazoo, Michigan (2008)
- Stadium at Loy Norrix High School; Kalamazoo, Michigan (2009–present)

== Average attendance ==
Attendance stats are calculated by averaging each team's self-reported home attendances from the historical match archive at https://web.archive.org/web/20100105175057/http://www.uslsoccer.com/history/index_E.html

- 2008: 371
- 2009: 221
- 2010: 158
