= Kalamazoo Kingdom =

- Full name: Kalamazoo Kingdom
- Nicknames: The Kings, The Royals
- Founded: 1996
- Dissolved: 2006
- Stadium: Mayor's Riverfront Park
- Capacity: 4,000
- Chairman: (England) Chris Keenan
- Manager: (New Zealand) Stu Riddle
- League: USL Premier Development League
- 2006: 4th, Great Lakes Division
Home colours	Away colours

Kalamazoo Kingdom were an American soccer team, founded in 1996. The team was a member of the United Soccer Leagues Premier Development League (PDL), the fourth tier of the American Soccer Pyramid, until 2006, when the team left the league and the franchise was terminated.

The Kingdom folded their franchise at the end of the 2006 season to re-focus their efforts on youth soccer in the Kalamazoo area, specifically supporting their teams for the Super Y-League, as well as their own indoor soccer league.

They played their home games at Mayor's Riverfront Stadium in Kalamazoo, Michigan. The team's colors were red, white and black.

== Year-by-year ==
Year	Division	League	Regular season	Playoffs	Open Cup
1996	4	USISL Premier League	5th, Central Northern	Division Semifinals	Did not qualify
1997	4	USISL PDSL	3rd, North Central	Division Finals	Did not qualify
1998	4	USISL PDSL	3rd, Great Lakes	Division Semifinals	Did not qualify
1999	4	USL PDL	5th, Great Lakes	Did not qualify	Did not qualify
2000	4	USL PDL	3rd, Great Lakes	Did not qualify	Did not qualify
2001	4	USL PDL	5th, Great Lakes	Did not qualify	Did not qualify
2002	4	USL PDL	4th, Great Lakes	Did not qualify	Did not qualify
2003	4	USL PDL	4th, Great Lakes	Did not qualify	Did not qualify
2004	4	USL PDL	4th, Great Lakes	Did not qualify	Did not qualify
2005	4	USL PDL	5th, Great Lakes	Did not qualify	Did not qualify
2006	4	USL PDL	4th, Great Lakes	Did not qualify	Did not qualify

== Coaches ==
- (United States) Rich Shelton 1996–97
- (United States) Mark Sweet 1998
- (United States) Chris Keenan 1998–2000
- (New Zealand) Stu Riddle 2006

== Stadia ==
- Soisson-Rapacz-Clason Field, Kalamazoo, Michigan 1996–2000
- Mayor's Riverfront Stadium, Kalamazoo, Michigan 2003–06
  - McCamley Field, Portage, Michigan 2003–04, 2006 (4 games)
  - Stadium at Mattawan High School, Mattawan, Michigan 2006 (1 game)

== Average Attendance ==
- 1996: 1,845 (1st in Premier League) Playoffs: 1,142 Overall: 1,795
- 1997: 2,192 (1st in PDSL) Playoffs: 1,205 Overall: 2,122
- 1998: 1,970 (2nd in PDSL) Playoffs: 3,217 Overall: 2,109
- 1999: 793 (4th in PDL)
- 2000: 1,058 (3rd in PDL)
- 2001: 1,044 (5th in PDL)
- 2002: 1,232 (5th in PDL)
- 2003: 1,248 (3rd in PDL)
- 2004: 1,160 (3rd in PDL)
- 2005: 701 (9th in PDL)
- 2006: 442 (16th in PDL)

== See also ==
- Kalamazoo Outrage
