= George Nanchoff =

Soccer player (born 1954)

Personal information
- Date of birth: April 17, 1954 (age 72)
- Place of birth: Resen, Yugoslavia
- Positions: Forward; midfielder

Youth career
- 1973–1976: University of Akron

Senior career*
Years	Team	Apps	(Gls)
1977	Fort Lauderdale Strikers (indoor)		(1)
1977–1978	Fort Lauderdale Strikers	32	(8)
1979–1980	Atlanta Chiefs	38	(6)
1979–1980	Atlanta Chiefs (indoor)	7	(7)
1980–1982	Phoenix Inferno (indoor)	37	(42)
1982–1985	Cleveland Force (indoor)	110	(54)
2005	Cleveland Internationals		

International career
1977–1979	United States	10	(1)

Managerial career
- 2003–: Cleveland Internationals
- * Club domestic league appearances and goals

George Nanchoff (born 1954) is an American retired soccer player. He spent three seasons in the North American Soccer League and seven seasons in the Major Indoor Soccer League. Born in Yugoslavia and raised in the United States, he also earned ten caps, scoring one goal, with the U.S. national team between 1979 and 1980.

== Youth and college career ==
In 1969, Nanchoff emigrated with his family from Yugoslavia, he was fifteen years old. His family settled in Akron, Ohio, United States, where he attended Central-Hower High School. After high school, he attended the University of Akron where he played as a forward on the men's soccer team from 1973 to 1976. He led the team in scoring his first three seasons, but lost out to his brother Louis in 1976. That year, both George and Louis earned first team All American. George also had garnered first team honors in 1975. He finished his four-year career with the Zips second on the team's career scoring list with fifty-six goals and thirty-two assists. The University of Akron inducted George into the school's Athletic Hall of Fame in 1986. In 1987, Summit County inducted Louis into its Sports Hall of Fame.

== Club career ==
=== NASL ===
In 1977, the Fort Lauderdale Strikers of the North American Soccer League (NASL) selected Nanchoff in the NASL College Draft. He scored one goal for the Strikers playing indoors. That outdoor season, he led the team in both scoring and points with eight goals and twenty-two points. His points production dropped precipitously in 1978 as he scored no goals in ten games. The Strikers then traded him to the Atlanta Chiefs where he rejoined his brother Louis. He played two outdoor seasons and one indoor with the Chiefs before moving to indoor soccer full-time in the MISL.

=== MISL ===
In 1980, Nanchoff signed with the Phoenix Inferno of Major Indoor Soccer League. In 1982, the Inferno traded Nanchoff to the Cleveland Force midway through the season. Nanchoff remained with the Force until he retired from playing professionally in 1985.

== International career ==
Nanchoff earned ten caps, scoring one goal, with the U.S. national team between 1977 and 1979. His first cap came in a September 18, 1977, loss to Guatemala. On October 16, 1977, he scored his lone national team goal in a 2–1 victory over China. His last game came in a February 11, 1979, loss to the Soviet Union.

In 1979, Nanchoff was also a critical part of the U.S. Olympic soccer team which qualified for the 1980 Summer Olympics to be held in Moscow. He led the team in scoring, but his and his teammates' hopes for success at the games were crushed when President Carter boycotted the games in protest of the Soviet Union's invasion of Afghanistan.

== Coaching career ==
After retiring from playing professionally, Nanchoff became a youth soccer coach with the Cleveland-based Internationals Soccer Club. In 2003, Internationals S.C. entered a men's team, the Cleveland Internationals in the U.S. Fourth Division USL Premier Development League. Nanchoff has served as the team's coach since then as well as the club's Director of Coaching. He has also trained multiple national team prospects. Nanchoff played some games for the Internationals during the 2005 PDL season, recording 4 assists.

== Career statistics ==
Scores and results list the United States' goal tally first.

No	Date	Venue	Opponent	Score	Result	Competition
1.	16 October 1977	Candlestick Park, San Francisco, United States	China	1-0	2–1	Friendly
