= Louis Nanchoff =

Soccer player (born 1956)

Louie Nanchoff
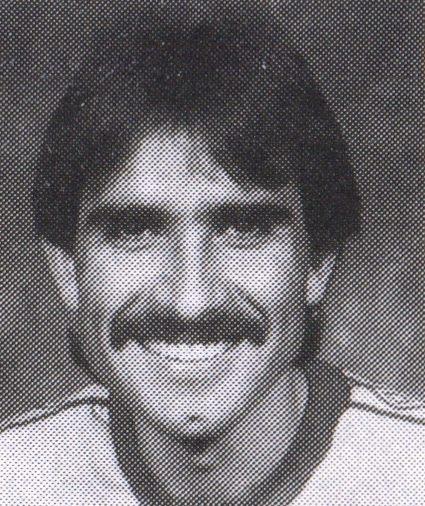
- Nanchoff circa 1984

Personal information
- Date of birth: May 13, 1956 (age 70)
- Place of birth: Resen, Yugoslavia (now North Macedonia)
- Height: 5 ft 10 in (1.78 m)
- Positions: Forward; midfielder

College career
Years	Team	Apps	(Gls)
1974–1977	Akron Zips		

Senior career*
Years	Team	Apps	(Gls)
1978	Colorado Caribous	23	(4)
1979–1980	Atlanta Chiefs	32	(7)
1979–1980	Atlanta Chiefs (indoor)	6	(7)
1980–1982	Philadelphia Fever (indoor)	48	(37)
1982–1985	Cleveland Force (indoor)	122	(90)
1985–1986	Dallas Sidekicks (indoor)	41	(37)
1986–1987	St. Louis Steamers (indoor)	14	(4)
1987	Kansas City Comets (indoor)	27	(14)

International career
1979–1980	United States	10	(1)
- * Club domestic league appearances and goals

Louis "Louie" Nanchoff (born May 13, 1956) is a retired soccer player. He spent three seasons in the North American Soccer League and seven seasons in the Major Indoor Soccer League. Born in Yugoslavia, he represented the United States national team.

== Youth and college ==
Louis immigrated with his family from North Macedonia, then Yugoslavia, when he was thirteen years old. His family settled in Akron, Ohio, where he attended Central-Hower High School. After high school, he attended the University of Akron where he played as a forward on the men's soccer team from 1974 to 1977. He and his brother George were top players with the Zips. Both Louie and George earned first team All American honors in 1976. This was the first time in NCAA history that two brothers received first team recognition the same year. Louie then garnered second team honors in 1977.

== NASL ==
In 1978, the expansion franchise Colorado Caribous of the North American Soccer League selected Nanchoff in the NASL College Draft. He spent that season with the Caribous, then moved with the team when it relocated to Atlanta between the 1978 and 1979 seasons. Nanchoff continued with the team, now known as the Atlanta Chiefs, for the next two outdoor seasons and the 1979–80 indoor season before leaving the NASL. Nanchoff played in fifty-five regular-season outdoor games during his three seasons in the NASL.

== MISL ==
In 1980, Nanchoff signed with the Philadelphia Fever of the Major Indoor Soccer League. He spent the next two indoor seasons with the Fever. He signed with the Cleveland Force for the 1982–83 season. In the 1983–1984 season, his most productive with the Force, he scored thirty-six goals in forty-two games. On August 16, 1985, Nanchoff signed as a free agent with the Dallas Sidekicks. In his one season with the Sidekicks, he scored thirty-eight goals in forty-five regular season and playoff games. In July 1986, Dallas sold Nanchoff's contract to the St. Louis Steamers. His contract required that his salary be guaranteed if the team was sold. New team ownership was quoted in the Dallas Morning News as saying "Not even Tatu has that." He began the season in St. Louis, but finished it with the Kansas City Comets.

== National and Olympic Teams ==
Nanchoff earned ten caps, scoring one goal, with the U.S. national team between 1979 and 1980. His first cap came in a February 11, 1979, loss to the Soviet Union. On October 26, 1979, he scored his lone national team goal in a 2–0 victory over Hungary in Budapest. His last game came in a November 9, 1980, loss to Mexico.

In 1979, Nanchoff was also a critical part of the U.S. Olympic soccer team which qualified for the 1980 Summer Olympics to be held in Moscow. He led the team in scoring, but his and his teammates' hopes for success at the games were crushed when President Carter boycotted the games in protest of the Soviet Union's invasion of Afghanistan.

== Coaching ==
Since retiring, Nanchoff has joined his brother George as a coach with the Cleveland-based Internationals Soccer Club where he coaches a boys' team.

In 1996, Summit County inducted Nanchoff into its Sports Hall of Fame
