= 2008 Carolina RailHawks FC season =

The Carolina RailHawks played the second season in team history in 2008.

== 2008 Competitions ==
Competition	Record	Result	Home Matches	Home Attendance	Avg. Home Attendance
USL First Division Regular Season	9-11-10	8th Place	15		
U.S. Open Cup	2-1	Third Round	3		
Southern Derby	2-1-1	Champion	2		
Exhibitions	3-3-2	N/A	8		
All Competitions	16-16-13	N/A	28		

== 2008 squad ==
Note: Flags indicate national team as defined under FIFA eligibility rules; some limited exceptions apply. Players may hold more than one non-FIFA nationality.

No.	Pos.	Nation	Player
0	GK	USA	Chris McClellan
1	GK	USA	Brian Levey
2	DF	USA	David Stokes
3	MF	USA	Kupono Low
4	DF	HON	Richard Perdomo
5	MF	SCO	David Lilly
6	FW	USA	Nathan Zuzga
7	MF	URU	Martin Nuñez
8	DF	USA	Joey Worthen
10	FW	SLV	Ronald Cerritos
11	MF	SCO	Ross MacKenzie
12	MF	USA	Ryan Solle
13	MF	USA	Eddie Gutierrez
14	DF	USA	Caleb Norkus

No.	Pos.	Nation	Player
15	DF	USA	Frank Sanfilippo
16	MF	USA	Steven Curfman
17	MF	ENG	Matthew Watson
18	MF	USA	Chris Lemons
19	FW	CIV	Hamed Diallo
20	FW	USA	Jacob Coggins
21	MF	ARG	Santiago Fusilier
22	FW	USA	Dan Antoniuk
23	DF	USA	Chad Dombrowski
24	DF	CHI	Mauricio Segovia
25	MF	USA	Phillip Long
30	GK	USA	Gregory Walters
34	MF	CUB	Rey Ángel Martínez

Transfers:

- OUT: Jamil Walker to Rochester Rhinos (7/9/2008); Connally Edozien to Miami FC (9/1/2008)
- IN: Hamed Diallo from Rochester Rhinos (7/9/2008); Ronald Cerritos from Real Maryland Monarchs (8/1/2008); Eddie Gutierrez from Miami FC (8/1/2008); Rey Ángel Martínez from Rochester Rhinos (8/21/2008)

== 2008 Staff ==
Coach - (United States) Scott Schweitzer
Assistant Coach - (United States) Damon Nahas
Assistant Coach - (United States) Mark Girard
Goalkeeping Coach - (United States) David Noyes
Equipment Manager - (United States) Jeff Morsch
Trainer - (United States) Elise Caceres

== 2008 Schedule ==
Date	Opponent	Location	Time (ET)	Result
March 21	UNC-Greensboro (Exhibition)	WakeMed Soccer Park, Cary, NC	7:00 PM	5-0 W
March 25	Campbell University (Exhibition)	WakeMed Soccer Park, Cary, NC	7:00 PM	3-1 W
March 28	New York Red Bulls (Exhibition)	WakeMed Soccer Park, Cary, NC	7:30 PM	0-1 L
March 29	Wake Forest University (Exhibition)	WakeMed Soccer Park, Cary, NC	7:00 PM	2-3 L
April 9	UNC-Chapel Hill (Exhibition)	WakeMed Soccer Park, Cary, NC	7:00 PM	0-4 L
April 12	University of Virginia (Exhibition)	WakeMed Soccer Park, Cary, NC	12:00 PM	1-0 W
April 13	Minnesota Thunder (Exhibition)	WakeMed Soccer Park, Cary, NC	1:00 PM	1-1 D
April 19	Atlanta Silverbacks	Silverbacks Park, Atlanta, GA	7:55 PM	1-1 D
April 26	Charleston Battery	WakeMed Soccer Park, Cary, NC	7:30 PM	1-0 W
May 4	Miami FC	Tropical Park Stadium, Miami, FL	6:00 PM	1-0 W
May 10	Atlanta Silverbacks^^	WakeMed Soccer Park, Cary, NC	7:30 PM	2-2 D
May 18	Minnesota Thunder	WakeMed Soccer Park, Cary, NC	6:00 PM	0-0 D
May 24	Rochester Rhinos	WakeMed Soccer Park, Cary, NC	7:30 PM	1-1 D
May 28	Seattle Sounders	WakeMed Soccer Park, Cary, NC	7:30 PM	2-1 W
May 31	Atlanta Silverbacks^^	Silverbacks Park, Atlanta, GA	7:55 PM	0-1 L
June 10	Brooklyn Knights^^^	WakeMed Soccer Park (Field 2), Cary, NC	7:30 PM	1-0 W
June 12	Puerto Rico Islanders	Estadio Juan Ramón Loubriel, Bayamon, PR	8:00 PM	0-3 L
June 14	Miami FC	Tropical Park Stadium, Miami, FL	7:30 PM	0-2 L
June 20	Rochester Rhinos	PAETEC Park, Rochester, NY	7:35 PM	3-3 D
June 22	Montreal Impact	Stade Saputo Montréal, Quebec	3:30 PM	0-3 L
June 24	Real Maryland^^^	WakeMed Soccer Park, Cary, NC	7:30 PM	1-0 W
June 27	Portland Timbers^	WakeMed Soccer Park, Cary, NC	8:00 PM	1-0 W
July 1	Kansas City Wizards^^^	WakeMed Soccer Park, Cary, NC	7:30 PM	2-4 L aet
July 3	Seattle Sounders	WakeMed Soccer Park, Cary, NC	8:00 PM	2-2 D
July 11	Minnesota Thunder	James Griffin Stadium, St. Paul, MN	8:05 PM	2-2 D
July 13	Vancouver Whitecaps	Swangard Stadium, Burnaby, BC	10:00 PM	1-1 D
July 18	Puerto Rico Islanders	WakeMed Soccer Park, Cary, NC	7:30 PM	0-2 L
July 20	Club de Futbol Monterrey (exhibition)	WakeMed Soccer Park, Cary, NC	4:00 PM	0-0 (1-4 PK)
July 24	Portland Timbers	PGE Park, Portland, OR	10:00 PM	0-0 D
July 26	Vancouver Whitecaps	Swangard Stadium, Burnaby, BC	10:00 PM	0-1 L
August 1	Vancouver Whitecaps^	WakeMed Soccer Park Cary, NC	8:00 PM	2-3 L
August 3	Puerto Rico Islanders	Estadio Juan Ramón Loubriel, Bayamon, PR	6:00 PM	0-1 L
August 8	Montreal Impact	WakeMed Soccer Park Cary, NC	7:30 PM	0-2 L
August 15	Miami FC^	WakeMed Soccer Park Cary, NC	8:00 PM	3-2 W
August 22	Minnesota Thunder	James Griffin Stadium, St. Paul, MN	8:05 PM	2-1 W
August 24	Seattle Sounders	Starfire Sports Complex, Tukwila, WA	10:00 PM	3-4 L
August 30	Montreal Impact	WakeMed Soccer Park Cary, NC	7:30 PM	0-2 L
September 6	Charleston Battery^^	WakeMed Soccer Park Cary, NC	7:30 PM	3-1 W
September 14	Rochester Rhinos	WakeMed Soccer Park Cary, NC	6:00 PM	1-1 D
September 19	Charleston Battery^,^^	Blackbaud Stadium, Charleston, SC	7:30 PM	2-1 W
September 20	Portland Timbers	WakeMed Soccer Park Cary, NC	7:30 PM	1-0 W

^ Televised nationally on Fox Soccer Channel

^^ Southern Derby fixtures

^^^ U.S. Open Cup fixtures
