= 2007 Carolina RailHawks FC season =

The Carolina RailHawks launched their inaugural season on April 21, 2007, in front of a crowd of 6,327 at SAS Soccer Park in Cary, North Carolina when they drew 1–1 with the Minnesota Thunder in their first official regular season match. Midfielder Kupono Low scored the first goal in franchise history when he blasted a 24-yard left-footed shot past Thunder keeper Joe Warren in the 8th minute of the inaugural match. On May 8, 2007, the RailHawks earned their first franchise victory 2–0 against Chivas USA in an exhibition match.

On August 14, 2007, with a 3–0 victory over the Charleston Battery, the Carolina RailHawks secured their first piece of silverware, the 2007 Southern Derby Cup, with one match remaining in the contest. The RailHawks finished their first USL-1 season in 8th place in the league table, securing the league's final playoff spot on the last day of the regular season with a 2–0 victory away over fellow expansion franchise the California Victory. The RailHawks were eliminated from the playoff quarterfinals by the eventual league champion Seattle Sounders.

== 2007 Competitions ==
| Competition | Record | Result | Home Matches | Home Attendance | Avg. Home Attendance |
|---|---|---|---|---|---|
| USL First Division Regular Season | 8-12-8 | 8th Place | 14 | 71,735 | 5,124 |
| USL First Division Playoffs | 0-2 | Quarterfinals | 1 | 923 | 923 |
| U.S. Open Cup | 4-1 | Semifinals | 4 | 13,447 | 3,362 |
| Southern Derby | 3-0-1 | Champion | 2 | 9,587 | 4,794 |
| Exhibitions | 1-1-0 | N/A | 2 | 13,705 | 6,853 |
| All Competitions | 13-16-8 | N/A | 21 | 99,810 | 4,753 |

== 2007 squad ==
Note: Flags indicate national team as defined under FIFA eligibility rules; some limited exceptions apply. Players may hold more than one non-FIFA nationality.

| No. | Pos. | Nation | Player |
|---|---|---|---|
| 0 | GK | USA | Chris McClellan |
| 1 | GK | IRL | John O'Hara |
| 2 | DF | USA | David Stokes |
| 3 | MF | USA | Kupono Low |
| 4 | DF | USA | Demetrius Donald |
| 5 | MF | GHA | Philip Kutsu |
| 6 | MF | TRI | Joel John Bailey |
| 7 | MF | BRA | Marcio Leite |
| 8 | FW | NGA | Connally Edozien |
| 9 | FW | LBR | McColm Cephas |
| 10 | FW | TRI | Kevin Jeffrey |
| 11 | MF | USA | Chris Carrieri |
| 12 | FW | USA | Anthony Maher |
| 13 | DF | USA | Matthew Maher |

| No. | Pos. | Nation | Player |
|---|---|---|---|
| 14 | DF | USA | Caleb Norkus |
| 15 | DF | USA | Frank Sanfilippo |
| 16 | DF | USA | Cooper Friend |
| 17 | MF | USA | Eric Kaufman |
| 18 | DF | ENG | Stuart Brightwell |
| 19 | MF | USA | David Sartorio |
| 20 | MF | USA | Mark Jonas |
| 21 | MF | ARG | Santiago Fusilier |
| 22 | MF | NIR | Jonny Steele |
| 23 | DF | USA | Chad Dombrowski |
| 24 | MF | USA | Joey Worthen |
| 25 | MF | USA | Phillip Long |
| 26 | MF | USA | Jon Caldwell |
| 27 | MF | USA | Dario Brose |

Transfers: OUT - Sola Abolaji to Vancouver Whitecaps (7/27/2007); IN - Joel John Bailey from Vancouver Whitecaps (7/27/2007)

== 2007 Staff ==
Coach - (United States) Scott Schweitzer
Assistant Coach - (United States) Damon Nahas
Assistant Coach - (United States) Mark Girard Oldest coach in the usa Goalkeeping Coach - (United States) David Noyes
Equipment Manager - (United States) Steven Economides
Trainer - (United States) Elise Caceres

== 2007 Schedule ==
| Date | Opponent | Location | Time (ET) | Result |
|---|---|---|---|---|
| Sat, Mar 24 | Wake Forest University (exhibition) | SAS Soccer Park, Field #2 | 7:00 PM | 1-3 L |
| Sat, Mar 31 | North Carolina Tar Heels (exhibition) | SAS Soccer Park, Field #2 | 7:00 PM | 0-1 L |
| Wed, Apr 4 | Charlotte Eagles (exhibition) | SAS Soccer Park, Field #2 | 7:00 PM | 1-3 L |
| Sat, Apr 7 | Richmond Kickers (exhibition) | University of Richmond Stadium | 7:00 PM | 1-3 L |
| Fri, Apr 13 | Duke University (exhibition) | Koskinen Stadium, Durham, NC | 7:00 PM | 1-3 L |
| Sat, Apr 21 | Minnesota Thunder | SAS Soccer Park, Cary, NC | 7:30 PM | 1-1 D |
| Sat, Apr 28 | Atlanta Silverbacks | SAS Soccer Park, Cary, NC | 7:30 PM | 0-0 D |
| Fri, May 4 | Puerto Rico Islanders | SAS Soccer Park, Cary, NC | 7:30 PM | 0-0 D |
| Sat, May 5 | Atlanta Silverbacks | Silverbacks Park, Atlanta, GA | 7:55 PM | 0-2 L |
| Tue, May 8 | Chivas USA (exhibition) | SAS Soccer Park, Cary, NC | 7:30 PM | 2-0 W |
| Sat, May 12 | Atlanta Silverbacks^^ | Silverbacks Park, Atlanta, GA | 7:55 PM | 1-2 W |
| Sat, May 19 | Charleston Battery | SAS Soccer Park, Cary, NC | 7:30 PM | 1-0 W |
| Wed, May 23 | Seattle Sounders | Qwest Field, Seattle, WA | 10:00 PM | 0-1 L |
| Fri, May 25 | Vancouver Whitecaps | Swangard Stadium Burnaby, BC | 10:00 PM | 0-1 W |
| Sun, May 27 | Portland Timbers | PGE Park, Portland, OR | 9:00 PM | 0-0 D |
| Fri, Jun 8 | Rochester Raging Rhinos | SAS Soccer Park, Cary, NC | 7:30 PM | 2-2 D |
| Tue, Jun 12 | RWB Adria^^^ | SAS Soccer Park, Cary, NC | 7:30 PM | 4-1 W |
| Fri, Jun 15 | Seattle Sounders^ | SAS Soccer Park, Cary, NC | 8:00 PM | 0-1 L |
| Sat, Jun 23 | Charleston Battery^^ | SAS Soccer Park, Cary, NC | 7:30 PM | 2-0 W |
| Tue, Jun 26 | Bavarian SC^^^ | SAS Soccer Park, Cary, NC | 7:30 PM | 4-0 W |
| Tue, Jul 3 | Vancouver Whitecaps | SAS Soccer Park, Cary, NC | 8:00 PM | 0-0 D |
| Fri, Jul 6 | Rochester Raging Rhinos^ | PAETEC Park, Rochester, NY | 8:00 PM | 1-2 L |
| Sun, Jul 8 | Montreal Impact | Sherbrooke University Stadium, Sherbrooke, QC | 4:00 PM | 2-2 D |
| Fri, Jul 13 | Montreal Impact | SAS Soccer Park, Cary, NC | 7:30 PM | 0-1 L |
| Sun, Jul 15 | Chicago Fire^^^ | SAS Soccer Park, Cary, NC | 7:30 PM | 1-0 W |
| Fri, Jul 20 | Miami FC | Tropical Park Stadium, Miami, FL | 7:30 PM | 1-2 L |
| Sun, Jul 22 | Puerto Rico Islanders | Estadio Juan Ramón Loubriel, Bayamon, PR | 5:00 PM | 1-3 L |
| Wed, Jul 25 | Cruz Azul (exhibition) | SAS Soccer Park, Cary, NC | 8:00 PM | 0-2 L |
| Sat, Jul 28 | Miami FC | SAS Soccer Park, Cary, NC | 7:30 PM | 1-4 L |
| Wed, Aug 1 | Montreal Impact | Complexe sportif Claude-Robillard, Montreal, QC | 7:30 PM | 1-4 L |
| Fri, Aug 3 | California Victory^ | SAS Soccer Park, Cary, NC | 8:00 PM | 2-0 W |
| Tue, Aug 7 | Richmond Kickers^^^ | SAS Soccer Park, Cary, NC | 7:30 PM | 1-0 W |
| Fri, Aug 10 | Rochester Raging Rhinos | PAETEC Park, Rochester, NY | 7:35 PM | 0-2 L |
| Tue, Aug 14 | Charleston Battery^^ | Blackbaud Stadium, Charleston, SC | 7:30 PM | 3-0 W |
| Fri, Aug 17 | Atlanta Silverbacks^^ | SAS Soccer Park, Cary, NC | 7:30 PM | 0-0 D |
| Sun, Aug 26 | Montreal Impact | SAS Soccer Park, Cary, NC | 6:00 PM | 1-0 W |
| Sat, Sep 1 | Portland Timbers | SAS Soccer Park, Cary, NC | 7:30 PM | 0-1 L |
| Tue, Sept 4 | New England Revolution^^^ | Veteran's Stadium, New Britain, CN | 7:30 PM | 2-1(aet) L |
| Thu, Sep 6 | Minnesota Thunder | James Griffin Stadium, St. Paul, MN | 8:05 PM | 0-5 L |
| Sat, Sep 8 | California Victory | Kezar Stadium, San Francisco, CA | 10:00 PM | 0-2 W |
| Fri, Sep 14 | Seattle Sounders^^^^ | SAS Soccer Park, Cary, NC | 7:30 PM | 0-2 L |
| Sun, Sep 16 | Seattle Sounders^^^^ | Qwest Field, Seattle, WA | 6:00 PM | 0-1 L |

^ Televised nationally on Fox Soccer Channel

^^ Southern Derby fixtures

^^^ U.S. Open Cup fixtures

^^^^ USL-1 Playoffs fixtures
