= John Ball (soccer, born 1972) =

American soccer player

Personal information
- Date of birth: November 5, 1972 (age 54)
- Place of birth: Newtown, Connecticut, United States
- Height: 5 ft 10 in (1.78 m)
- Positions: Defender; midfielder

College career
Years	Team	Apps	(Gls)
1992–1995	Southern Connecticut State Owls		

Senior career*
Years	Team	Apps	(Gls)
1996–1997	Cleveland Crunch (indoor)	40	(18)
1996	Connecticut Wolves		(3)
1997	Carolina Dynamo	24	(6)
1998	Staten Island Vipers	24	(4)
1998–2005	Cleveland Crunch/Force (indoor)	240	(150)
1999	Chicago Fire	9	(0)
2000	Rochester Raging Rhinos	18	(5)
2001	Charleston Battery	23	(6)
2002	Carolina Dynamo	12	(2)
2003	Milwaukee Wave United	26	(4)
2004	Atlanta Silverbacks	21	(3)
2005–2009	Rochester Rhinos	123	(10)
2005	Chicago Storm (indoor)	5	(3)
2005–2007	California Cougars (indoor)	30	(16)
2007	Chicago Storm (indoor)	18	(7)
2010	CASL Elite		
2010–2011	Ohio Vortex (indoor)	7	(3)
2012	Rochester Lancers (indoor)	5	(1)
2013–2014	Cleveland Freeze (indoor)	13	(3)

International career
2004–2007	U.S. Futsal		
- * Club domestic league appearances and goals as of February 25, 2013

John Ball (born November 5, 1972, in Newtown, Connecticut) is an American soccer player who most recently played for the PASL team Cleveland Freeze. He has an extensive career, playing both indoor and outdoor soccer. He spent one season in Major League Soccer with the Chicago Fire and was a part of the United States national futsal team which went to the second round of the 2004 FIFA Futsal World Championship.

== Player ==
=== College ===
Ball played college soccer for Southern Connecticut State. While at Southern Connecticut State, his team won the NCAA Division II Championship in his freshman and senior year while reaching the Final Four in all four years.

=== Professional ===
On January 1, 1996, the Cleveland Crunch selected Ball in the second round of the 1995 National Professional Soccer League Amateur Draft. He played game at the end of the regular season. However, he played several during the playoffs as the Crunch won the league championship. He remained with the Crunch for the 1996–1997 season. He was named to the All Rookie team that year, despite playing one game during the previous season, as the Crunch fell to the Kansas City Attack in the championship series.

In addition to his indoor career, Ball had an extensive outdoor career as well. In the summer of 1996, he signed with the Connecticut Wolves of the USISL. In 1997, he moved to the Carolina Dynamo and then the Staten Island Vipers in 1998. He was All League that season. In 1998, Ball returned to the Crunch and played for them every winter until the team folded in 2005. On July 15, 1999, the Chicago Fire signed Ball as a discovery player. He made his debut against the Dallas Burn, playing 90 minutes, on August 22, 1999. He scored his first and only MLS goal in the Western Conference Semifinals against the Dallas Burn on October 16, 1999. The Fire released him at the end of the season. In 2000, Ball moved to the Rochester Rhinos for one season before signing with the Charleston Battery in 2001. He continued his nomadic ways, playing for the Carolina Dynamo in 2002, the Milwaukee Wave United in 2003 and the Atlanta Silverbacks in 2004.

In 2005, Ball rejoined the Rochester Raging Rhinos of the USL-1. While he had spent most of his outdoor career in the midfield, he moved to right back in 2008. In 2010, the Rhinos did not re-sign Ball and he moved to the amateur CASL Elite. During these years, Ball continued to play indoor soccer. In 2005, the Chicago Storm selected Ball in the MISL Dispersal Draft after Cleveland folded. However, in a December 3, 2005, game against the Baltimore Blast, Ball had an altercation with a fan which led to a two-game suspension by the league. This led the Storm to trade Ball to the California Cougars for Anthony Maher and the rights to Andy Rosenband on December 27, 2005. In January 2007, the Cougars traded Ball back to the Storm in exchange for Semir Mesanovic, Elvir Kafedzic and a first round draft pick in the 2007 MISL Amateur Draft.

On January 27, 2010, Ball joined the Ohio Vortex of the Professional Arena Soccer League. Ball played the amateur team CASL Elite in the Lamar Hunt U.S. Open Cup in 2010; his team won their regional qualification group (which also featured NPSL teams FC Tulsa and Atlanta FC) before falling 4–2 to USL Second Division pro side Charleston Battery in the first round of tournament proper. On January 27, 2010, Ball signed with the Ohio Vortex of the Professional Arena Soccer League, playing three games and scoring one goal through the end of the season. In February 2012, he joined the Rochester Lancers.

== Coach ==
Ball is a coach in the Cleveland, Ohio area. He was the boys' high school coach at Elyria from 2012 to 2014 and is currently a club coach with Cleveland Futbol Club.
