= Dustin Swinehart =

American soccer player

Personal information
- Full name: Dustin Swinehart
- Date of birth: July 1, 1974 (age 52)
- Place of birth: Columbus, Ohio, United States
- Height: 6 ft 0 in (1.83 m)
- Position: Forward

College career
| Years | Team | Apps | (Gls) |
| 1992–1995 | Miami RedHawks | | |

Senior career*
| Years | Team | Apps | (Gls) |
| 1998–2009 | Charlotte Eagles | 228 | (125) |
| 2004 | → Richmond Kickers (loan) | 3 | (1) |
| 2005 | → Richmond Kickers (loan) | 5 | (0) |
| 2010 | CASL Elite | | |
- * Club domestic league appearances and goals as of June 16, 2010

Dustin Swinehart (born July 1, 1974, in Columbus, Ohio) is a former American soccer player. He spent virtually his entire professional career playing with the Charlotte Eagles. Swinehart was named the Director of Community Relations for Charlotte FC in January 2020 and terminated in August 2024.

== Career ==
=== College ===
Swinehart grew up in Worthington, Ohio and played college soccer at Miami University from 1992 to 1995. He finished his college career with 32 career goals, a school record.

=== Professional ===
Swinehart professional career began in 1996 when he signed with the Hampton Road Mariners in the USISL. 1997 he played with the Indiana Blast. In 1998, Swinehart signed with the Charlotte Eagles in the USISL, where he remained, with the exception of two brief loan periods with the Richmond Kickers in 2004 and 2005.

Swinehart was named the MVP of the 2000 USL Second Division championship game, and in 2001, after the Eagles moved up to the USL First Division, he was named to the USL-1 All League First Team. In 2004, after the Eagles returned to the USL Second Division, Swinehart considered retiring, but decided to continue with the team. He was named to the USL-2 All League first team in 2005, 2006 and 2008, while in 2008 he was also named as the USL-2 MVP.

On March 10, 2010, Swineheart announced his retirement from professional soccer. At his retirement, he was the Eagles' all-time leading goal scorer and was with the team longer than any other player. He was six time First Team All-League, and was part of two National Championship squads with the Eagles. He finished his professional career with 135 goals.

Swinehart played the amateur team CASL Elite in the Lamar Hunt U.S. Open Cup in 2010; his team won their regional qualification group (which also featured NPSL teams FC Tulsa and Atlanta FC) before falling 4–2 to USL Second Division pro side Charleston Battery in the first round of tournament proper.

Swinehart worked for Charlotte Football Club of Major League Soccer as the Director of Community Engagement from January 2020 until August 2024, when he was terminated. Swinehart sued Charlotte FC and its parent, Tepper Sports and Entertainment, in July 2026, claiming he was wrongfully terminated and alleging that the organization fosters "an uneven gender landscape" with "disparate standards for women and men in hiring, promotions, and terminations."
