= Curfman =

Curfman is a surname. Notable people with the surname include:

- Raymond A. Curfman (1915–1993), American football player and coach
- Shannon Curfman (born 1985), American blues-rock guitarist and singer
- Steven Curfman (born 1986), American soccer player
