= Chris McClellan =

Chris McClellan may refer to:

- Chris McClellan (soccer) (born 1981), American soccer player
- Chris McClellan (American football) (born 2003), American football defensive tackle
