= 2010 U.S. Open Cup =

2010 Lamar Hunt U.S. Open Cup
Tournament details
- Country: United States
- Teams: 40

Final positions
- Champions: Seattle Sounders FC (2nd title)
- Runners-up: Columbus Crew
- 2011–12 CONCACAF Champions League: Seattle Sounders FC

Tournament statistics
- Matches played: 39
- Goals scored: 110 (2.82 per match)
- Top goal scorer(s): Paulo Araujo Jr. Nate Jaqua (5)

The 2010 Lamar Hunt U.S. Open Cup was the 97th edition of the USSF's annual national soccer championship, running from June through early October.

The tournament proper featured teams from the top five levels of the American Soccer Pyramid. These five levels, namely Major League Soccer, the USSF D-2 Pro League, the United Soccer Leagues (Second Division and Premier Development League), and the United States Adult Soccer Association, each have their own separate qualification process to trim their ranks down to their final eight team delegations in the months leading up to the start of the tournament proper. The eight MLS clubs received byes into the third round, while the remaining 32 teams played in the first two rounds, with brackets influenced by geography.

The final took place on October 5, with Seattle Sounders FC defeating the Columbus Crew 2–1 at Qwest Field in Seattle, WA, in front of a U.S. Open Cup record crowd of 31,311. The Sounders became the first MLS team (and first team in 27 years) to win back-to-back Open Cups.

== Matchdays ==
Date	Round	Notes
June 15	First	32 USSF D2, USL, and USASA clubs enter
June 22	Second	
June 29/30	Round of 16	8 MLS clubs enter
July 6/7	Quarterfinals	
Sept. 1	Semifinals	
Oct. 5	Final	

== Participating teams ==
The tournament consisted of 40 teams. Eight teams each from the MLS, PDL, and USASA qualified according to their own procedures. All 15 American D-2 Pro league and USL Second Division teams qualified. The final slot went to the winner of a one-game playoff between the Sonoma County Sol and PSA Los Gatos Storm.

Major League Soccer (8 teams)

- Chicago Fire
- Chivas USA
- Columbus Crew
- Houston Dynamo
- Los Angeles Galaxy
- Seattle Sounders FC
- New York Red Bulls
- D.C. United

USSF D-2 Pro League (9 teams)

- Austin Aztex FC
- Carolina RailHawks FC
- Crystal Palace Baltimore
- Miami FC
- NSC Minnesota Stars
- Portland Timbers
- Rochester Rhinos
- AC St. Louis
- FC Tampa Bay

USL Second Division (6 teams)

- Charleston Battery
- Charlotte Eagles
- Harrisburg City Islanders
- Pittsburgh Riverhounds
- Real Maryland Monarchs
- Richmond Kickers

Premier Development League (8 teams)

- Kitsap Pumas
- Reading United
- Ventura County Fusion
- Long Island Rough Riders
- Dayton Dutch Lions
- Des Moines Menace
- DFW Tornados
- Central Florida Kraze

United States Adult Soccer Association (9 teams)

- Brooklyn Italians
- New York Pancyprian-Freedoms
- KC Athletics
- Detroit United
- CASL Elite
- Legends FC
- Arizona Sahuaros (NPSL)
- Bay Area Ambassadors (NPSL)
- Sonoma County Sol (NPSL)

== Open Cup bracket ==
Match pairings were determined by a blind draw. The Second round winners advanced to play one of eight MLS clubs in 16-team knockout tournament.
Home teams listed on top of bracket

First round
Harrisburg City Islanders (AET)	4
Brooklyn Italians	2
Long Island Rough Riders	2
NY Pancyprian-Freedoms	0

Second round
Harrisburg City Islanders	1
Long Island Rough Riders	0

First round
Richmond Kickers (AET)	1
Crystal Palace Baltimore	0
Reading United	1
Real Maryland Monarchs (AET)	2

Second round
Richmond Kickers	3
Real Maryland Monarchs	1

First round
Charleston Battery	4
CASL Elite	2
Carolina RailHawks	1
Charlotte Eagles	0

Second round
Charleston Battery	2
Carolina RailHawks	1

First round
Rochester Rhinos	2
Dayton Dutch Lions	0
Pittsburgh Riverhounds	2
Detroit United	0

Second round
Rochester Rhinos	3
Pittsburgh Riverhounds	0

First round
NSC Minnesota Stars	4
KC Athletics	2
Des Moines Menace	0
AC St. Louis	1

Second round
NSC Minnesota Stars	0
AC St. Louis	1

First round
Miami FC (AET)	5
Central Florida Kraze	1
Legends FC	0
FC Tampa Bay	3

Second round
Miami FC (AET)	2
FC Tampa Bay	1

First round
Austin Aztex	3
DFW Tornados	0
Ventura County Fusion	1 (2)
Arizona Sahuaros (AET/PSO)	1 (4)

Second round
Austin Aztex	3
Arizona Sahuaros	1

First round
Kitsap Pumas (AET)	4
Bay Area Ambassadors	2
Portland Timbers	3
Sonoma County Sol	0

Second round
Kitsap Pumas	1
Portland Timbers	4

Round of 16
Portland Timbers	1 (3)
Seattle Sounders FC	1 (4)
Los Angeles Galaxy	2
AC St. Louis	0
Houston Dynamo	1
Miami FC	0
Chivas USA	1
Austin Aztex	0
D.C. United	2
Richmond Kickers	0
Harrisburg City Islanders (AET)	1
New York Red Bulls	0
Columbus Crew	2
Rochester Rhinos	1
Chicago Fire	0 (0)
Charleston Battery (AET/PSO)	0 (3)

Quarterfinals
Seattle Sounders FC	2
Los Angeles Galaxy	0
Houston Dynamo	1
Chivas USA	3
D.C. United	2
Harrisburg City Islanders	0
Columbus Crew	3
Charleston Battery	0

Semifinals
Seattle Sounders FC	3
Chivas USA	1
D.C. United	1
Columbus Crew	2

Final
Seattle Sounders FC	2
Columbus Crew	1

== Schedule ==
Note: Scorelines use the standard U.S. convention of placing the home team on the right-hand side of box scores.

=== First round ===
June 15, 2010	Brooklyn Italians (USASA)	2–4 (a.e.t.)	Harrisburg City Islanders (USL-2)	Harrisburg, PA
7:00 pm EDT	Hamilton 16'; Nittoli 65' (yellow card) 74'; Hunter (yellow card) 115'; Candela (yellow card) 115'	Report	Jafta 19'; Hotchkin (yellow card) 66'; Calvano (yellow card) 76'; Bloes 89'; Pelletier (yellow card) 90+'; Noone 97'; Oppong 119'	Stadium: Skyline Sports Complex; Attendance: 521; Referee: Ian Bongaardt

June 15, 2010	Crystal Palace Baltimore (USSF D-2)	0–1 (a.e.t.)	Richmond Kickers (USL-2)	Richmond, VA
7:00 pm EDT	Brooks (yellow card) 70'; Yoshitake (yellow card) 100'; Neto (yellow card) 104'	Report	Burke (yellow card) 41'; Foglesong (yellow card) 70'; Delicâte 119'	Stadium: University of Richmond Stadium; Attendance: 1,123; Referee: Terrence Andrews

June 15, 2010	Detroit United (USASA)	0–2	Pittsburgh Riverhounds (USL-2)	Bridgeville, PA
7:00 pm EDT	Gatica (yellow card) 51'	Report	Weekes 35'; Gazda 42'; Tuttle (yellow card) 85'	Stadium: Chartiers Valley High School; Attendance: 257; Referee: John Safar

June 15, 2010	Dayton Dutch Lions (PDL)	0–2	Rochester Rhinos (USSF D-2)	Rochester, NY
7:05 pm EDT		Report	Nuñez 18'; Franks 28' (pen.)	Stadium: Marina Auto Stadium; Attendance: 3,127; Referee: Islam Sallaj

June 15, 2010	Charlotte Eagles (USL-2)	0–1	Carolina Railhawks (USSF D-2)	Cary, NC
7:30 pm EDT	Bentos (yellow card) 80'; Herrera (yellow card) 86'	Report	Bundu 23'	Stadium: WakeMed Soccer Park; Referee: Daniel Burak

June 15, 2010	NY Pancyprian-Freedoms (USASA)	0–2	Long Island Rough Riders (PDL)	South Huntington, NY
7:30 pm EDT	Pafitis (yellow card) 40'; Matteo (yellow card) 43'; Gustafsson (yellow card) 68'	Report	Hole (yellow card) 16'; Kramer 19'; Todd (yellow card) 42'; Grendi 65'; Gatti (yellow card) 78'	Stadium: Cy Donnelly Stadium; Attendance: 250; Referee: Richard Sanchez

June 15, 2010	Real Maryland Monarchs (USL-2)	2–1 (a.e.t.)	Reading United (PDL)	Reading, PA
7:30 pm EDT	Paterson (yellow card) 20' (goal) 71'; Hunter (yellow card) 44'; Evans (yellow card) 69'; Noviello (yellow card) 90' (goal) 99'; Sesay (yellow card) 105'; Borrajo (yellow card) 116'	Report	Schoenle 57'; Gaddis (yellow card) 98'	Stadium: Don Thomas Stadium; Attendance: 236; Referee: Stan Nagle

June 15, 2010	CASL Elite (USASA)	2–4	Charleston Battery (USL-2)	Charleston, SC
7:30 pm EDT	Merritt 53'; Coggins (yellow card) 76'; Swinehart 80'	Report	Massie 7'; Coleman 12'; Prince 42'; Heinemann 68'	Stadium: Blackbaud Stadium; Attendance: 797; Referee: Skye Arthur-Banning

June 15, 2010	Central Florida Kraze (PDL)	1–5 (a.e.t.)	Miami FC (USSF D-2)	Lauderhill, FL
7:30 pm EDT	Sosa (yellow card) 1'; Gutierrez (yellow card) 20'; Millar 57'		Gómez 2'; Dias (yellow card) 10'; Araujo 110', 112', 113', 119'	Stadium: Central Broward Regional Park; Referee: Fernando Iturriaga

June 15, 2010	KC Athletics (USASA)	2–4	NSC Minnesota Stars (USSF D-2)	Blaine, MN
7:00 pm CDT	Vermillion (yellow card) 27'; Hoffman 61' (pen.); Perkins 72'	Report	Ukah 35', 45+1'; Hlavaty (yellow card) 45' (goal) 75' (pen.); Bracalello 71'	Stadium: National Sports Center; Referee: Sam Trigui

June 15, 2010	AC St. Louis (USSF D-2)	1–0	Des Moines Menace (PDL)	West Des Moines, IA
7:30 pm CDT	Ambersley (yellow card) 52' (goal) 70'; Velten (yellow card) 56'; Nzinga (yellow card) 82'	Report	Bradford (yellow card) 46' (yellow-red card) 59'; Pearson (yellow card) 72'	Stadium: Valley Stadium; Attendance: 2,090; Referee: Landis Wiley

June 15, 2010	DFW Tornados (PDL)	0–3	Austin Aztex (USSF D-2)	Austin, TX
7:30 pm CDT	Ward (yellow card) 45'; Shirley (yellow card) 49'; Noel-Williams (yellow card) 58'	Report	Caicedo (yellow card) 21'; Watson 25', 63'; Worthen 33'; Campbell (yellow card) 37'	Stadium: House Park; Referee: Luis Guardia

June 15, 2010	FC Tampa Bay (USSF D-2)	3–0	Legends FC (USASA)	Dallas, TX
8:00 pm CDT	Burt 2'; Adjeman-Pamboe 38'; Ustruck (yellow card) 43'; King 85'			Stadium: Richland Stadium; Referee: Jorge Luna Hernandez

June 15, 2010	Sonoma County Sol (USASA)	0–3	Portland Timbers (USSF D-2)	Portland, OR
7:00 pm PDT	Santoya (yellow card) 34'; Summerscales (yellow card) 77'	Report	Nimo 58'; Suzuki 88'; Marcelin 90'	Stadium: PGE Park; Attendance: 2,107; Referee: Josh Wilkens

June 15, 2010	Bay Area Ambassadors (USASA)	2–4 (a.e.t.)	Kitsap Pumas (PDL)	Bremerton, WA
7:00 pm PDT	Begovic (yellow card) 16'; Mohammed (yellow card) 26'; Da Silva 71' 77'	Report	Fishbaugher 3', 110' (yellow card) 40'; Hyde 16'; Besagno (yellow card) 38'; Gray (yellow card) 80'; Phillips 96'	Stadium: Bremerton Memorial Stadium; Attendance: 504; Referee: Jeff Hosking

June 15, 2010	Arizona Sahuaros (USASA)	1–1 (a.e.t.) (4–2 p)	Ventura County Fusion (PDL)	Ventura, CA
7:05 pm PDT	DeLeon 26'; Parsons (yellow card) 40'	Report	Nicholson (yellow card) 25'; Jagne 60'	Stadium: Ventura College; Attendance: 487; Referee: Miguel Chicas
	Penalties
	C. Green (penalty scored); B. Green (penalty missed); LaMarca (penalty scored); Garcia (penalty scored); DeLeon (penalty scored)		(penalty missed) Watson; (penalty scored) Hustedt; (penalty scored) Di. Barrera; (penalty missed) Da. Barrera

=== Second round ===
June 22, 2010	Long Island Rough Riders (PDL)	0–1	Harrisburg City Islanders (USL-2)	Harrisburg, PA
7:00 pm EDT	Magill (yellow card) 83'	Report	Bloes 33'	Stadium: Skyline Sports Complex; Attendance: 457; Referee: Brian Dunn

June 22, 2010	Real Maryland Monarchs (USL-2)	1–3	Richmond Kickers (USL-2)	Richmond, VA
7:00 pm EDT	Sola (yellow card) 58'; Hunter (yellow card) 73'; Sanchez 83'	Report	William 10'; Vercollone (yellow card) 60'; Delicâte 69'; Foglesong 79'	Stadium: University of Richmond Stadium; Attendance: 1,360; Referee: Mark Gorak

June 22, 2010	Pittsburgh Riverhounds (USL-2)	0–3	Rochester Rhinos (USSF D-2)	Rochester, NY
7:05 pm EDT		Report	Rosenlund 3', 66'; Pitchkolan 8'	Stadium: Marina Auto Stadium; Attendance: 1,788; Referee: Sorin Stoica

June 22, 2010	Carolina RailHawks (USSF D-2)	1–2	Charleston Battery (USL-2)	Charleston, SC
7:30 pm EDT	Richardson (yellow card) 16'; Shields 64'	Report	Mayard 23'; Neagle 41'	Stadium: Blackbaud Stadium; Attendance: 1,409; Referee: Mark Cleland

June 22, 2010	FC Tampa Bay (USSF D-2)	1–2 (a.e.t.)	Miami FC (USSF D-2)	Fort Lauderdale, FL
7:30 pm EDT	Diaz (yellow card) 32' (goal) 82'; Nyazamba (yellow card) 58'; Valentino (yellow card) 79'; Burt (yellow card) 110'	(Report)	Araujo 2'; Kirby (yellow card) 22'; Thompson (yellow card) 61' (goal) 98' (pen.); Arguez (yellow card) 85'	Stadium: Lockhart Stadium; Attendance: 972; Referee: Mark Kadlecik

June 22, 2010	AC St. Louis (USSF D-2)	1–0	NSC Minnesota Stars (USSF D-2)	Blaine, MN
7:00 CDT	Cole (yellow card) 5'; Ambersley (yellow card) 30' (goal) 35'; Stisser (yellow card) 62'	Report		Stadium: National Sports Center; Attendance: 265; Referee: Elias Bazakos

June 22, 2010	Arizona Sahuaros (USASA)	1–3	Austin Aztex (USSF D-2)	Austin, TX
7:30 CDT	Cornwall 55'; Thames (yellow card) 64'; Blaze (yellow card) 74'; Hampton (yellow card) 90'	Report	Marošević (yellow card) 31' (goal) 35', 81', 90+'; Callahan (yellow card) 89'	Stadium: House Park; Referee: Carlos Salas

June 22, 2010	Portland Timbers (USSF D-2)	4–1	Kitsap Pumas (PDL)	Bremerton, WA
7:00 PDT	Smith 34'; Dike 37', 47', 62'; Keel (yellow card) 85'	(Report)	Besagno (yellow card) 63'; Christner 90'	Stadium: Bremerton Memorial Stadium; Attendance: 1,205; Referee: Manuel Soledad

=== Third round ===
June 29, 2010	New York Red Bulls (MLS)	0–1 (a.e.t.)	Harrisburg City Islanders (USL-2)	Harrisburg, PA
7:00 pm EDT	Chinn (yellow card) 11'	Report	Oppong 117'	Stadium: Skyline Sports Complex; Attendance: 1,868; Referee: Alex Prus (South Carolina)

June 29, 2010	Rochester Rhinos (USSF D-2)	1–2	Columbus Crew (MLS)	Columbus, OH
7:30 pm EDT	Spicer 69'; Motagalvan (red card) 85'	Report	Iro 30'; Lenhart 90+4'	Stadium: Columbus Crew Stadium; Attendance: 1,760; Referee: Hilario Grajeda (Ohio)

June 29, 2010	Chicago Fire (MLS)	0–0 (a.e.t.) (0–3 p)	Charleston Battery (USL-2)	Bridgeview, IL
7:30 pm CDT	Nyarko (yellow card) 48'; Conde (yellow card) 70'; Watson-Siriboe (yellow card) 73'; Pappa (yellow card) 88'	Report	Armstrong (yellow card) 16'; Zaher (yellow card) 90'	Stadium: Toyota Park; Attendance: 2,526; Referee: Victor Herrera (Illinois)
	Penalties
	McBride (penalty missed); Król (penalty missed); Conde (penalty missed)		(penalty scored) Neagle; (penalty scored) Zaher; (penalty scored) Fuller

June 29, 2010	Miami FC (USSF D-2)	0–1	Houston Dynamo (MLS)	Houston, TX
7:30 pm CDT	Patterson-Sewell (yellow card) 48'; Rodrigues (yellow card) 66' (yellow-red card) 83'	Report	Palmer 80'	Stadium: Robertson Stadium; Attendance: 832; Referee: Chris Penso (Ohio)

June 29, 2010	AC St. Louis (USSF D-2)	0–2	Los Angeles Galaxy (MLS)	Carson, CA
7:30 pm PDT	Salvaggione (yellow card) 72'	Report	Kirovski (yellow card) 55'; Klein 69'; Juninho 80'	Stadium: The Home Depot Center; Attendance: 2,179; Referee: Alejandro Mariscal (California)

June 29, 2010	Austin Aztex (USSF D-2)	0–1	Chivas USA (MLS)	Fullerton, CA
7:30 pm PDT	Needham (yellow card) 25'	Report	Padilla 13'	Stadium: Fullerton State Sports Complex; Referee: Josh Wilkens (Washington)

June 30, 2010	Richmond Kickers (USL-2)	0–2	D.C. United (MLS)	Fairfax, VA
7:30 pm EDT	Kalungi (yellow card) 31'	(Report)	Moreno 47'; Quaranta 56'; Allsopp (yellow card) 72'	Stadium: George Mason Stadium; Attendance: 2,985; Referee: Richard Sanchez (New York)

June 30, 2010	Seattle Sounders FC (MLS)	1–1 (a.e.t.) (4–3 p)	Portland Timbers (USSF D-2)	Portland, OR
7:30 pm PDT	Jaqua 13'; Riley (yellow card) 23'; Graham (yellow card) 43' (yellow-red card) 100'; Nyassi (yellow card) 58'	(Report)	Suzuki (yellow card) 23'; Dike 38'; Thompson (yellow card) 39'	Stadium: PGE Park; Attendance: 15,422; Referee: Ronald Lagraff (Oregon)
	Penalties
	Sturgis (penalty scored); Zakuani (penalty scored); Montero (penalty scored); Ianni (penalty missed); Scott (penalty scored)		(penalty missed) Pore; (penalty scored) DeMartin; (penalty scored) Danso; (penalty missed) Smith; (penalty scored) López

=== Quarterfinals ===
July 6, 2010	Charleston Battery (USL-2)	0–3	Columbus Crew (MLS)	Columbus, OH
7:30 pm EDT	Fuller (yellow card) 37'; Woodbine (yellow card) 64'	Report	Zayner (yellow card) 24'; Rentería 38' (pen.); Lenhart (yellow card) 42' (goal) 70'; Gaven 87'	Stadium: Columbus Crew Stadium; Attendance: 1,847; Referee: Hilario Grajeda (Ohio)

July 6, 2010	Chivas USA (MLS)	3–1	Houston Dynamo (MLS)	Houston, TX
7:30 pm CDT	Braun 5', 90'; Lahoud 65'; Padilla (yellow card) 68'; Mayen (yellow card) 90+5'	Report	Robinson (yellow card) 54'; Oduro 86'; Waibel (yellow card) 90+3'; Cruz (yellow card) 90+3'	Stadium: Robertson Stadium; Attendance: 1,097; Referee: Daniel Fitzgerald (North Carolina)

July 7, 2010	Los Angeles Galaxy (MLS)	0–2	Seattle Sounders FC (MLS)	Tukwila, WA
7:00 pm PDT	Cazumba (yellow card) 45'; Jordan (yellow card) 70'; Gordon (yellow card) 89'	Report	Jaqua 50', 62'; Estrada (yellow card) 89'	Stadium: Starfire Sports Complex; Attendance: 4,512; Referee: Jair Marrufo (Texas)

July 21, 2010	Harrisburg City Islanders (USL-2)	0–2	D.C. United (MLS)	Boyds, MD
7:30 pm EDT	Pelletier (yellow card) 23'; Noone (yellow card) 33'; Ruthven (red card) 75'	Report	Bošković 1'; Khumalo 47'; Rice (yellow card) 62'	Stadium: Maryland SoccerPlex; Attendance: 2,089; Referee: Hilario Grajeda (Ohio)

=== Semifinals ===
September 1, 2010	Columbus Crew (MLS)	2–1 (a.e.t.)	D.C. United (MLS)	Washington, D.C.
7:30 pm EDT	Iro 89'; O'Rourke (yellow card) 59'; Lenhart (yellow card) 96'; Barros Schelotto 98' (pen.)	Report	Hernández 13' (pen.); Jakovic (yellow card) 39'; Hernández (red card) 59'; Talley (yellow card) 97'	Stadium: RFK Stadium; Attendance: 3,411; Referee: Chris Penso (Ohio)

September 1, 2010	Chivas USA (MLS)	1–3	Seattle Sounders FC (MLS)	Tukwila, WA
7:30 pm PDT	Nagamura (yellow card) 51'; Padilla 66'	Report	Jaqua 10', 92'; Montero 59'; Alonso (yellow card) 79'	Stadium: Starfire Sports Complex; Attendance: 4,547; Referee: Ricardo Salazar (California)

=== Final ===
October 5, 2010
7:00 pm PDT

Columbus Crew (MLS)	1–2	Seattle Sounders FC (MLS)
Burns 24'; Francis (yellow card) 28'; Carroll (yellow card) 41'; Barros Schelotto (yellow card) 87'	(Report)	Riley (yellow card) 23'; Nyassi 38', 66' (yellow card) 76'; Alonso (yellow card) 72'

Qwest Field, Seattle, WA
Attendance: 31,311
Referee: Michael Kennedy (Wisconsin)

== Goal scorers ==
5 goals

- (Brazil) Paulo Araujo Jr. (MIA)
- (United States) Nate Jaqua (SEA)

4 goals

- (United States) Bright Dike (POR)

3 goals

- (United States) Perica Marošević (AUS)

2 goals

- (United States) Mike Ambersley (STL)
- (United States) Geoff Bloes (HAR)
- (United States) Justin Braun (CHV)
- (United States) Phil Da Silva (BAY)
- (England) Matthew Delicâte (RIC)
- (United States) John Fishbaugher (KIT)
- (England) Andy Iro (CLB)
- (South Africa) Thabiso Khumalo (DC)
- (United States) Steven Lenhart (CLB)
- (The Gambia) Sanna Nyassi (SEA)
- (Canada) Dominic Oppong (HAR)
- (Mexico) Jesús Padilla (CHV)
- (Canada) Tyler Rosenlund (ROC)
- (United States) Warren Ukah (MIN)
- (United States) Jamie Watson (AUS)

1 goal

- (United States) Kwame Adjeman-Pamboe (TB)
- (Argentina) Guillermo Barros Schelotto (CLB)
- (Italy) Simone Bracalello (MIN)
- (Montenegro) Branko Bošković (DC)
- (Sierra Leone) Sallieu Bundu (CAR)

1 goal (continued)

- (United States) Kevin Burns (CLB)
- (United States) Chad Burt (TB)
- (United States) Robby Christner (KIT)
- (United States) Levi Coleman (CHS)
- (Republic of Ireland) Kevin Cornwall (AZ)
- (United States) Nick DeLeon (AZ)
- (Cuba) Yendry Diaz (TB)
- (United States) Bobby Foglesong (RIC)
- (United States) Jamie Franks (ROC)
- (United States) Eddie Gaven (CLB)
- (United States) Adam Gazda (PIT)
- (Argentina) Christian Gómez (MIA)
- (United States) Alex Grendi (LI)
- (United States) Marco Hamilton (BRK)
- (United States) Tommy Heinemann (CHS)
- (Argentina) Pablo Hernández (DC)
- (United States) Neil Hlavaty (MIN)
- (United States) Stephen Hoffman (KC)
- (United States) Taylor Hyde (KIT)
- (South Africa) Nate Jafta (HAR)
- (The Gambia) Ousman Jagne (VEN)
- (Brazil) Juninho (LA)
- (United States) Aaron King (TB)
- (United States) Chris Klein (LA)
- (United States) Danny Kramer (LI)
- (United States) Michael Lahoud (CHV)
- (Haiti) James Marcelin (POR)
- (Canada) Pierre-Rudolph Mayard (CHS)
- (United States) Tim Merritt (CAS)

1 goal (continued)

- (England) Josiah Millar (CF)
- (Colombia) Fredy Montero (SEA)
- (Bolivia) Jaime Moreno (DC)
- (United States) Alex Nimo (POR)
- (United States) Paul Nittoli (BRK)
- (United States) J.T. Noone (HAR)
- (United States) Jyler Noviello (RMM)
- (United States) Tino Nuñez (ROC)
- (Ghana) Dominic Oduro (HOU)
- (Jamaica) Lovel Palmer (HOU)
- (Scotland) Nicki Paterson (RMM)
- (United States) Kyle Perkins (KC)
- (United States) Stephen Phillips (KIT)
- (United States) Aaron Pitchkolan (ROC)
- (United States) Zach Prince (CHS)
- (United States) Santino Quaranta (DC)
- (Venezuela) Emilio Rentería (CLB)
- (United States) Alan Sanchez (RMM)
- (United States) Eric Schoenle (REA)
- (Scotland) Greg Shields (CAR)
- (Canada) Ross Smith (POR)
- (United States) Darren Spicer (ROC)
- (Japan) Takayuki Suzuki (POR)
- (United States) Dustin Swinehart (CAS)
- (United States) Abe Thompson (MIA)
- (United States) Alex Weekes (PIT)
- (Cameroon) Yomby William (RIC)
- (United States) Joey Worthen (AUS)
