= 2011 U.S. Open Cup qualification (NPSL) =

2011 NPSL U.S. Open Cup Qualifying determined the four NPSL qualifiers for the 2011 U.S. Open Cup. In contrast to prior years, where NPSL teams had to qualify for the U.S. Open Cup through the USASA Regional tournaments, the NPSL was awarded four entries to the 2011 U.S. Open Cup. The NPSL elected to give one berth to each of its four divisions.

== Northeast Division ==
The Northeast Division representative was determined by a three-team tournament played on May 7 and May 27, 2011. Brooklyn Italians qualify.

Semifinal		Final
		Brooklyn Italians	2
FC Buffalo	0	FC Sonic Lehigh Valley	1
Brooklyn Italians	1

May 7, 2011	Brooklyn Italians	1 – 0	FC Buffalo	Brooklyn, New York
19:00 EDT	Joseph 25'	Report		Stadium: John Dewey High School

May 27, 2011	FC Sonic Lehigh Valley	1 – 2	Brooklyn Italians	Bethlehem, PA
19:30 EDT		Report		Stadium: Ulrich Sports Complex

== Southeast Division ==
The Southeast Division's qualifier was determined in a six-team tournament held at Finley Stadium in Chattanooga, Tennessee, on May 27–29, 2011. Chattanooga FC qualify.

First Round; May 27, 2011
Jacksonville United	1
Knoxville Force	0
FC Tulsa	1
Rocket City United	7

Semifinals; May 28, 2011
Jacksonville United	1
Atlanta Silverbacks Reserves	3
Rocket City United	0
Chattanooga FC	2

Finals; May 29, 2011
Atlanta Silverbacks Reserves	0
Chattanooga FC	1

May 27, 2011	Knoxville Force	1 – 0	Jacksonville United	Chattanooga, Tennessee
17:30 EDT		Report	Williams 53'	Stadium: Finley Stadium

May 27, 2011	Rocket City United	7 – 1	FC Tulsa	Chattanooga, Tennessee
20:00 EDT	Hyde 13', 22', 33', 64'; Nkurunungi 59'; Nunez 80' (pen.)	Report	Cottage 31'	Stadium: Finley Stadium

May 28, 2011	Atlanta Silverbacks Reserves	3 – 1	Jacksonville United	Chattanooga, Tennessee
17:30 EDT	Nandi 28'; Morgan 86'; Duque 90+'	Report	Williams 23'	Stadium: Finley Stadium

May 28, 2011	Chattanooga FC	2 – 0	Rocket City United	Chattanooga, Tennessee
20:00 EDT	Moore 65'; Ochieng 74'	Report		Stadium: Finley Stadium; Attendance: 1350

May 29, 2011	Chattanooga FC	1 – 0	Atlanta Silverbacks Reserves	Chattanooga, Tennessee
19:00 EDT	Ochieng 116'	Report		Stadium: Finley Stadium; Attendance: 1402

== Midwest Division ==
The Midwest Division slot was automatically awarded to the Madison 56ers. The 56ers earned the bid as 2010 U.S. Open Cup division qualifying champions, as well as the fact none of the other divisional rivals had expressed interest in a qualifying tournament.

== West Division ==
The West Division representative was awarded to the club with the highest point total after its first seven league matches. The berth was clinched by the Hollywood United Hitmen after the San Diego Flash had two games forfeited by the NPSL for the use of an illegal player.

Team	Pld	W	L	D	GF	GA	GD	Pts
Hollywood United Hitmen*	7	7	0	0	34	3	+31	21
Santa Ana Winds	6	5	1	0	15	6	+9	15
San Diego Flash*	7	5	2	0	14	9	+5	15
Sonoma County Sol	6	3	2	1	16	10	+6	10
San Diego Boca	7	3	4	0	14	16	-2	9
Sacramento Gold	6	2	2	2	10	8	+2	8
FC Hasental	7	2	4	1	13	17	-4	7
Bay Area Ambassadors*	7	1	5	1	9	22	-13	4
Lancaster Rattlers	4	1	3	0	4	9	-5	3
Real San Jose	7	1	6	0	4	32	-28	3

Updated to games played 19 May 2011.
Tiebreakers: (1) Points; (2) Goal difference; (3) Goals scored
*-Includes 3-0 forfeitures imposed on San Diego Flash for using an illegal player
