= CASL Elite =

American amateur soccer team

- Full name: Capital Area Soccer League Elite
- Founded: 2009
- Ground: WakeMed Soccer Park; Cary, North Carolina
- Capacity: 10,000
- Owner: (United States) Vinny Mangelli
- Head Coach: (United States) Scott McGuinn
- League: Capital Area Soccer League; USASA
Home colors	Away colors

CASL Elite is an American amateur soccer team based in Raleigh, North Carolina, United States. Founded in 2009, the team plays in Region III of the United States Adult Soccer Association, a network of amateur leagues at the fifth tier of the American Soccer Pyramid.

The team plays its home games at WakeMed Soccer Park in nearby Cary, North Carolina. The team's colors are red, white, and black.

== History ==
CASL Elite was founded in 2009 by members of the Raleigh-based Capital Area Soccer League, and was originally intended to be a loose group which would train with and play against the upper level Capital Area Soccer League youth teams, including the club’s CASL Chelsea teams that play in the US Soccer Federation Development Academy. However, when it became apparent that the wealth of talent playing for the team could compete on a more professional level, the team decided to enter the Lamar Hunt U.S. Open Cup in 2010

CASL Elite qualified for the 2010 tournament at the first attempt, winning their regional qualification group (which also featured NPSL teams FC Tulsa and Atlanta FC) before falling 4–2 to USL Second Division pro side Charleston Battery in the first round of tournament proper.

CASL Elite is closely associated with, but is not the same team as, the Raleigh CASL Elite amateur team which competed in the USL Premier Development League for many years, and was known as the Cary Clarets in its final competitive season in 2009.

== Players ==
=== 2010 USOC roster ===
Note: Flags indicate national team as defined under FIFA eligibility rules; some limited exceptions apply. Players may hold more than one non-FIFA nationality.

No.	Pos.	Nation	Player
—	DF	USA	John Ball
—	DF	USA	Evan Brown
—	DF	USA	Shane Carew
—	DF	NGA	Chiedu Chukwumah
—	FW	USA	Jacob Coggins
—	MF	USA	Steven Curfman
—	MF	USA	Pat Danford
—	DF	USA	Tim Evans
—	GK	USA	Chris McClellan

No.	Pos.	Nation	Player
—	MF	USA	Scott McGuinn
—	MF	USA	Tim Merritt
—	MF	SKN	John Queeley
—	MF	USA	Dave Sartorio
—	FW	USA	Scott Schweitzer
—	MF	USA	Dustin Swinehart
—	MF	USA	Andy Truex
—	GK	USA	Matt Waldrop
—	DF	USA	Mike Walters

== Year-by-year ==
Year	Division	League	Regular season	Playoffs	Open Cup
2013	4	NPSL	5th, Mid-Atlantic	Did not qualify	Did not qualify

== Head coaches ==
- (United States) Scott McGuinn (2009–present)

== Stadia ==
- WakeMed Soccer Park; Cary, North Carolina (2009–present)
