= Jacob Coggins =

American soccer player (born 1978)

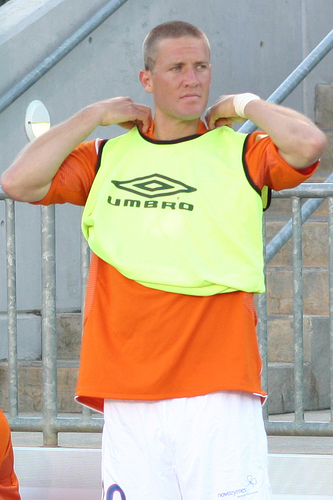

Personal information
- Date of birth: November 28, 1978 (age 47)
- Place of birth: Charlotte, North Carolina, United States
- Height: 6 ft 4 in (1.93 m)
- Position: Forward

Team information
- Current team: Sporting Charlotte

Senior career*
Years	Team	Apps	(Gls)
1998–1999	Wilmington Hammerheads		
2000–2007	Charlotte Eagles	103	(50)
2008	Carolina RailHawks	10	(1)
2009-2010	Charlotte Eagles	18	(2)
2010–	CASL Elite		
- * Club domestic league appearances and goals as of June 16, 2010

Jacob Coggins (born November 28, 1978) is an American soccer player who plays as a forward for USASA amateur team Sporting Charlotte.

== Career ==
=== Youth ===
Born in Charlotte, North Carolina, Coggins attended Independence High School in Charlotte. He was not recruited by any major colleges and passed on offers from small schools.

=== Professional ===
While attending a community college in Charlotte in 1998, he attended to a tryout with the Wilmington Hammerheads of the USISL D-3 Pro League who offered him a contract. In 2000, he moved to the Charlotte Eagles. In 2001, the Eagles moved up to the second division USL A-League, dropping back to the USL Second Division for the 2004 season. That year, he was the USL-2 scoring leader and league MVP, repeating both titles in 2005, as the Eagles won the league championship. He suffered from injuries during the 2006 season, which limited him to fourteen games. However, he returned strong in 2007, again leading the USL-2 in scoring.

On December 5, 2007, Coggins signed with the Carolina RailHawks of the USL First Division. He made his league debut in a 1–1 tie with the Atlanta Silverbacks on April 19, 2008.

At the end of the season, he returned to Charlotte where he became a coach in the Eagles youth system. On March 31, 2009, he signed with the Eagles, and played 18 games for the team over the course of the season before being released at the end of the year.

Coggins played the amateur team CASL Elite in the Lamar Hunt U.S. Open Cup in 2010; his team won their regional qualification group (which also featured NPSL teams FC Tulsa and Atlanta FC) before falling 4–2 to USL Second Division pro side Charleston Battery in the first round of tournament proper.

=== International ===
In February 2005, Coggins was called into the United States national team training camp when a contract dispute led the first team players to refuse to enter camp. He was going to start against Trinidad with teammate Dustin Swinehart. However, Coggins never played a game with the national team.
