= George Gorse =

American art historian

- Born: George Lawrence Gorse; January 6, 1949 (age 77); Ithaca, New York, U.S.
- Occupations: Art historian Educator
- Spouse: Naomi Sawelson

Academic background
- Education: Johns Hopkins University (BA); Brown University (MA and Ph.D.)
- Thesis: The Villa Doria in Fassolo, Genoa (1980)
- Doctoral advisor: Catherine Zerner

Academic work
- Discipline: Art history
- Sub-discipline: Medieval and Renaissance architecture
- Institutions: Pomona College

George Lawrence Gorse (born January 6, 1949) is an American art historian and educator. A scholar of medieval and Renaissance architecture, Gorse is the Viola Horton Professor of Art History at Pomona College.

== Early life and education ==
Gorse was born on January 6, 1949, in Ithaca, New York, the son of George Edward, a veterinarian, and Ruth Marie Knox. He was raised in Stroudsburg, Pennsylvania, where he graduated from Stroudsburg High School in 1967.

He attended Johns Hopkins University, where he received a Bachelor of Arts in Humanities in 1971 and then Brown University, where he received a Master of Arts in 1974 and a Doctor of Philosophy in art history in 1980. He wrote a master's thesis on the Castel Sant'Angelo in Rome, while his doctoral dissertation was on the villa of Andrea Doria in Genoa, supervised by Professor Catherine Zerner.

While in school, Gorse gained teaching experience as an instructor and lecturer at Brown (1974-1975), University of Rhode Island (1974-1975), Bryant University (1977), and the University of Pennsylvania (1980).

== Career ==
Gorse began his professorial career at Pomona College, where he has since been employed. He was Viola Horton Assistant Professor from 1980 to 1985, Viola Horton Associate Professor from 1985 to 1993, and became the Viola Horton Professor of Art History in 1993. Gorse was also the chair of the art history department.

Gorse is a scholar of medieval and Renaissance architecture. He focuses especially on the eleventh through sixteenth centuries in Genoa, and has published extensively on the topic.
