= List of Colorado Rockies first-round draft picks =

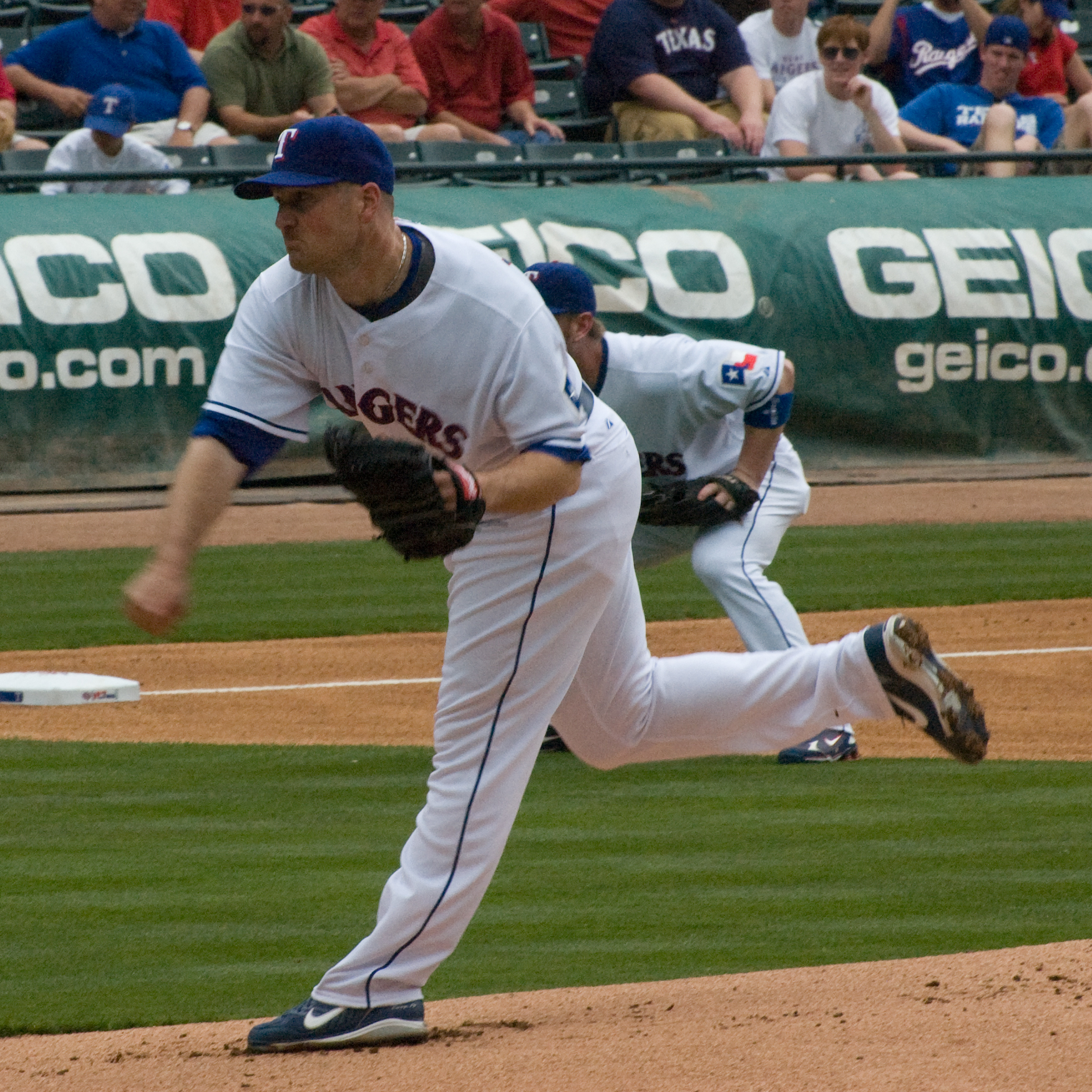
Jason Jennings is the only of the Rockies' first-round draft picks to win the Rookie of the Year Award (2002).

The Colorado Rockies are a Major League Baseball (MLB) franchise based in Denver, Colorado. They play in the National League West division. The Rockies have participated in MLB's annual June draft since 1992. Officially known as the "First-Year Player Draft", the Rule 4 Draft is MLB's primary mechanism for assigning players from high schools, colleges, and other amateur clubs to its franchises. The draft order is determined based on the previous season's standings, with the team possessing the worst record receiving the first pick. In addition, teams which lost free agents in the previous off-season may be awarded compensatory or supplementary picks. Since the franchise was established as an expansion team in 1992, the Rockies have selected 31 players in the first round. The First-Year Player Draft is unrelated to the 1992 expansion draft through which the Rockies filled their roster. Of the 31 players selected in the first round by the Rockies, 18 have been pitchers, the most of any position; 12 of these have been right handed, and 6 have been left-handed. The Rockies have also selected six outfielders, four shortstops, and one player each at catcher, first base, and third base. The Rockies have never selected a second baseman in the first round. The Rockies have drafted 16 players out of high school, and 14 out of college. Colorado has drafted seven players from high schools or colleges in the state of California, with five coming from Texas and three from Tennessee. The Rockies' 2002 selection—Jeff Francis—is the only selection from outside the United States.

None of the Rockies' first-round picks have won a World Series championship with the team. One pick has been elected to the Hall of Fame, Todd Helton who was the 8th overall pick in 1995. The Rockies' first-round selection in 1999—Jason Jennings—won the MLB Rookie of the Year award with the franchise in 2002, his first full season in the Major Leagues. Todd Helton—the Rockies' 1995 selection—has won four Silver Slugger Awards and three Gold Gloves, as well as being named to five All-Star teams. Casey Weathers, the Rockies' 2007 selection, won a bronze medal in baseball with the United States team at the 2008 Summer Olympics. The Rockies have never held the first overall pick in the draft, but held the second overall pick once, which they used in 2006 to select Greg Reynolds.

The Rockies have received nine compensatory picks, including seven selections made in the supplemental round of the draft since the franchise's first draft in 1992. These additional picks are provided when a team loses a particularly valuable free agent in the previous off-season,^{[V]} or, more recently, if a team fails to sign a draft pick from the previous year. The Rockies have failed to sign their first round pick only once—2000 selection Matt Harrington—for which they received the 44th overall pick in the 2001 draft.

== Key ==
Year	Links to an article about that year's Major League Baseball draft
Position	Indicates the secondary/collegiate position at which the player was drafted, rather than the professional position the player may have gone on to play
Pick	Indicates the number of the pick
*	Player did not sign with the Rockies
§	Indicates a supplemental pick
‡	Indicates a competitive balance pick
†	Member of the National Baseball Hall of Fame and Museum

== Picks ==
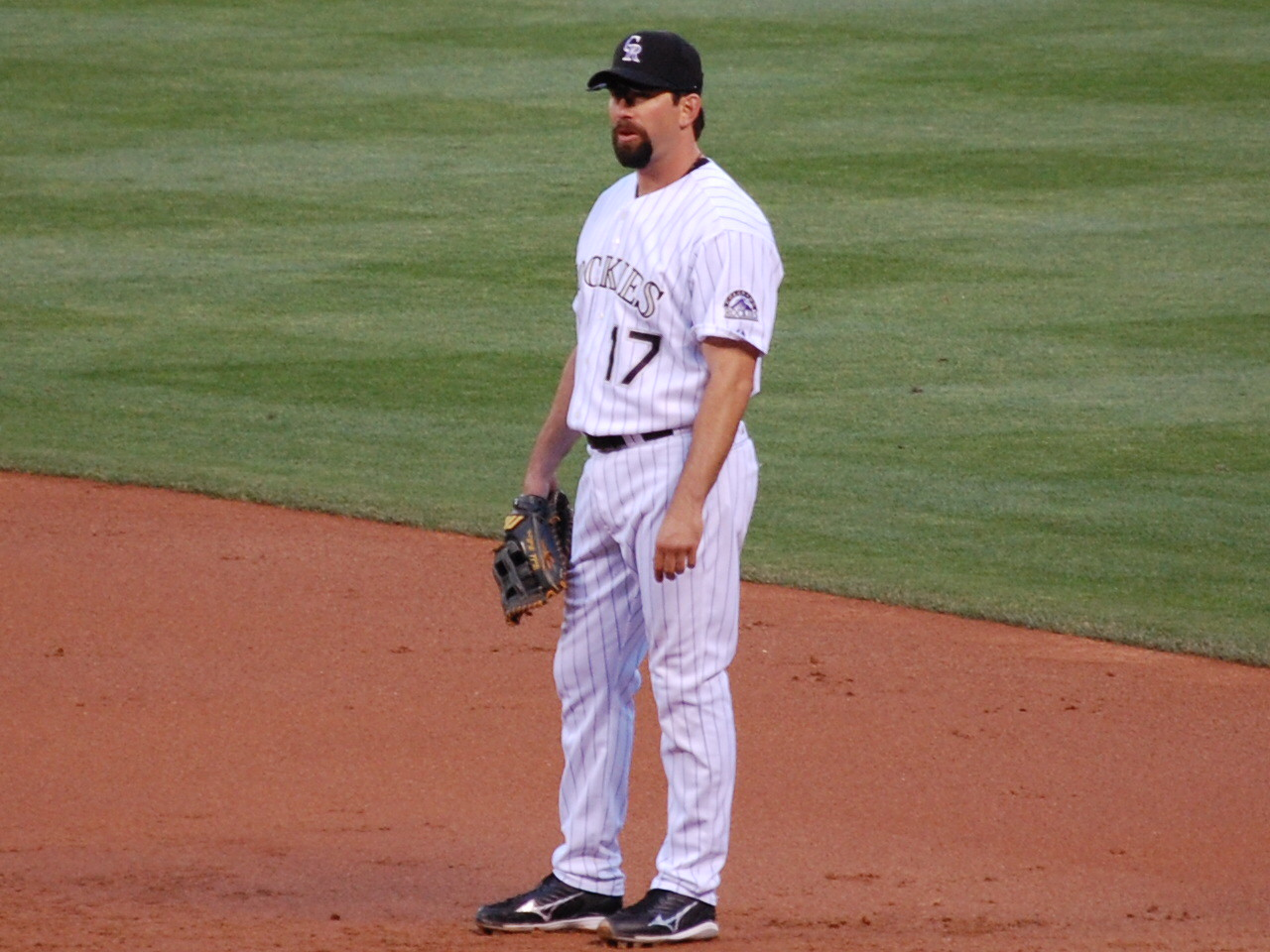
Todd Helton (1995) is a five-time All-Star selection.

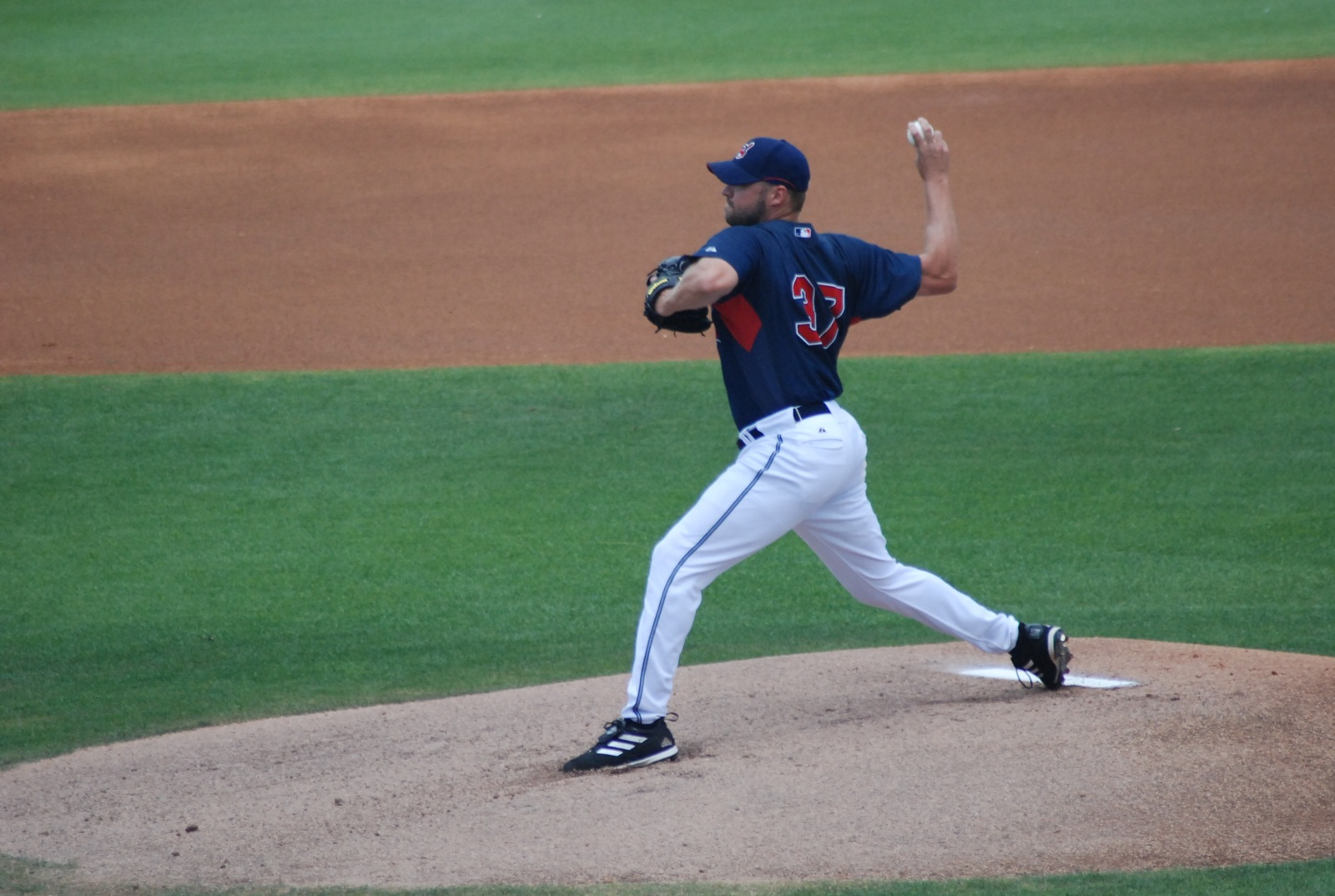
Jake Westbrook (1996) is the Rockies' only selection out of Georgia.

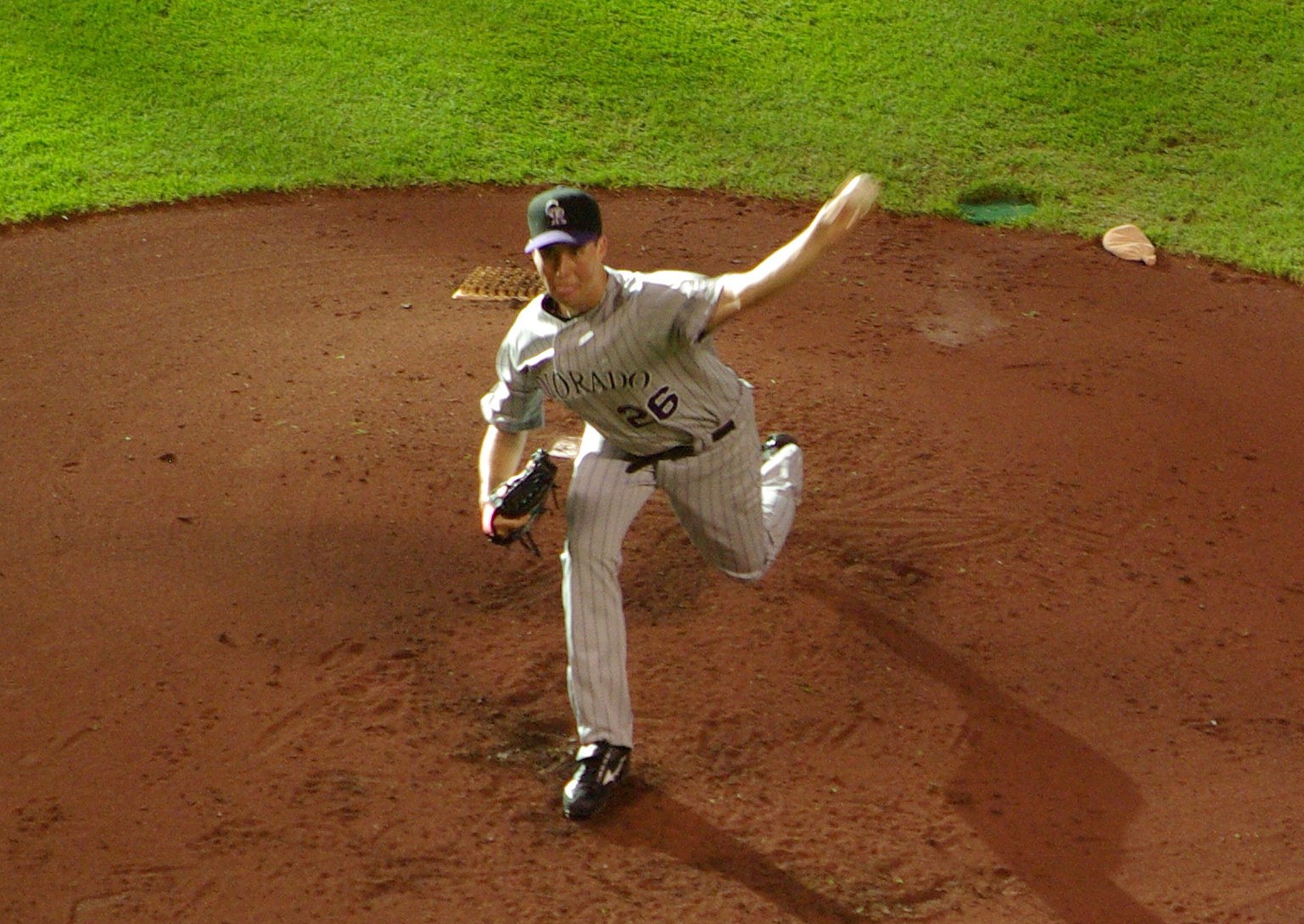
Jeff Francis (2002) is the Rockies' only selection from outside the United States.

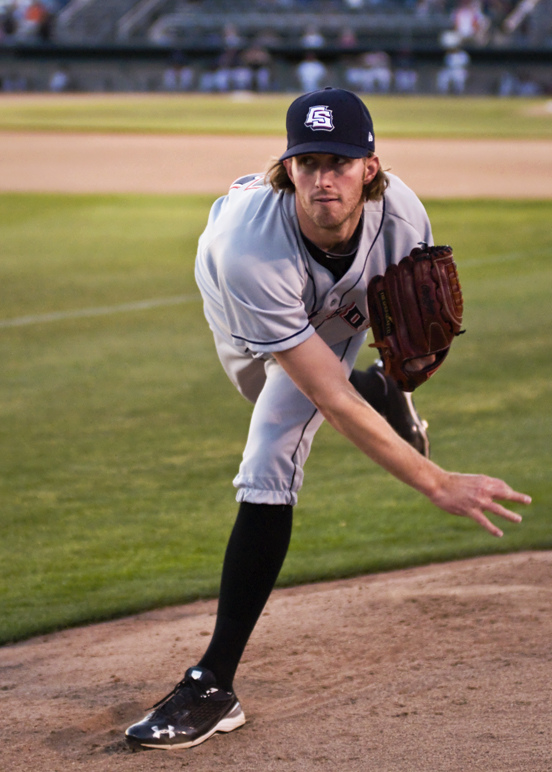
Greg Reynolds (2006) was drafted second overall by the Rockies, their highest draft selection in team history.

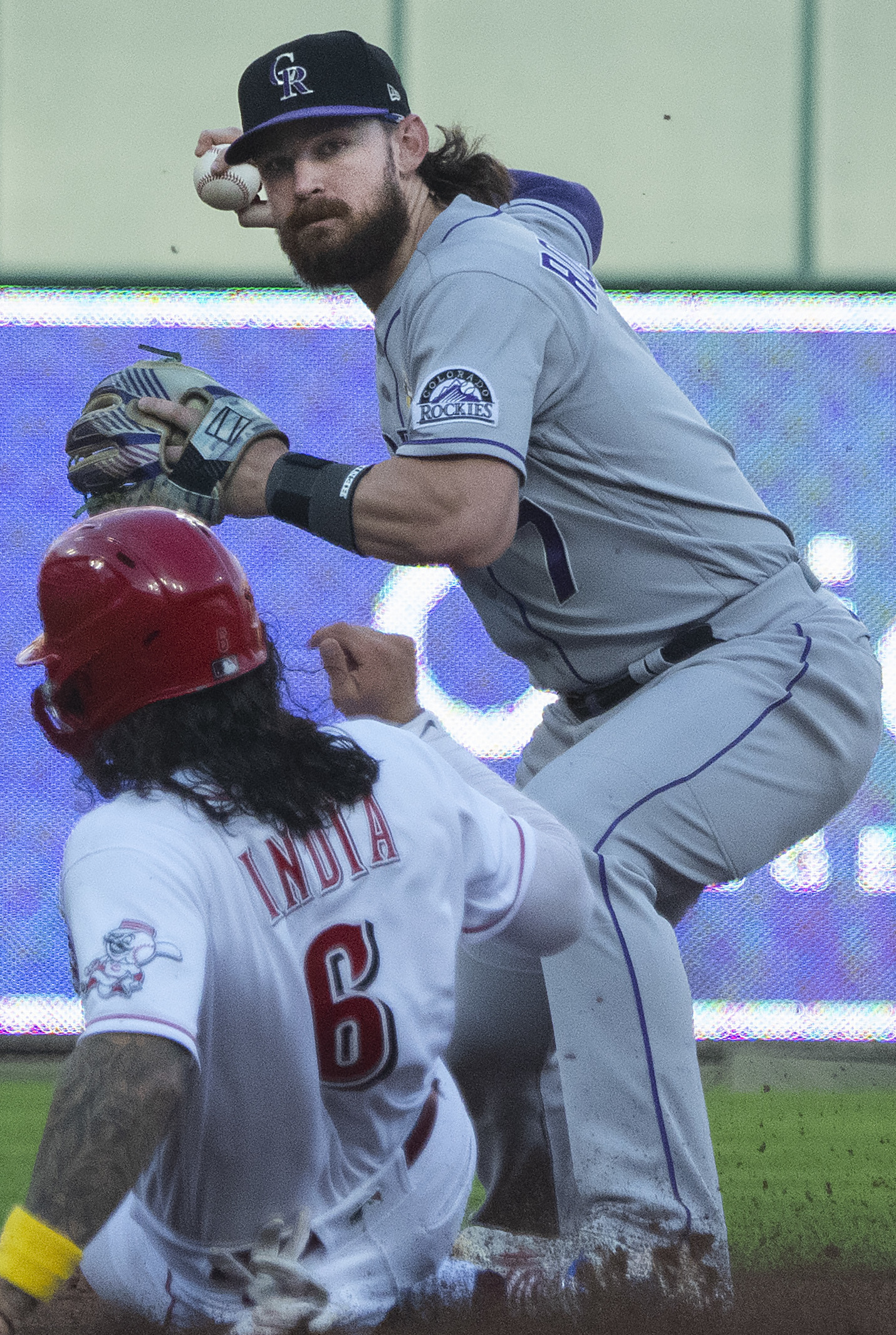
Brendan Rodgers was the first of three players selected by the Rockies in the first round of the 2015 draft.

Year	Name	Position	School (location)	Pick	Ref
1992	John Burke	Right-handed pitcher	University of Florida (Gainesville, Florida)	27	
1993	Jamey Wright	Right-handed pitcher	Westmoore High School (Oklahoma City, Oklahoma)	28	
1994	Doug Million	Left-handed pitcher	Sarasota High School (Sarasota, Florida)	7	
1995	Todd Helton^{†}	First baseman	University of Tennessee (Knoxville, Tennessee)	8	
1996	Jake Westbrook	Right-handed pitcher	Madison County High School (Danielsville, Georgia)	21	
1997	Mark Mangum	Right-handed pitcher	Kingwood High School (Kingwood, Texas)	18	
1997	Jason Fitzgerald	Outfielder	Tulane University (New Orleans, Louisiana)	41§^{[e]}	
1998	Matt Roney	Right-handed pitcher	Edmond North High School (Edmond, Oklahoma)	28^{[a]}^{[b]}	
1998	Choo Freeman	Outfielder	Dallas Christian School (Rowlett, Texas)	36§^{[c]}	
1998	Jeff Winchester	Catcher	Archbishop Rummel High School (Metairie, Louisiana)	40§^{[d]}	
1999	Jason Jennings	Right-handed pitcher	Baylor University (Waco, Texas)	16	
2000	Matt Harrington*	Right-handed pitcher	Palmdale High School (Palmdale, California)	7	
2001	Jayson Nix	Shortstop	Midland High School (Midland, Texas)	44§^{[e]}^{[f]}	
2002	Jeff Francis	Left-handed pitcher	University of British Columbia (Vancouver, British Columbia)^{[g]}	9	
2003	Ian Stewart	Third baseman	La Quinta High School (La Quinta, California)	10	
2004	Chris Nelson	Shortstop	Redan High School (Stone Mountain, Georgia)	9	
2005	Troy Tulowitzki	Shortstop	California State University, Long Beach (Long Beach, California)	7	
2005	Chaz Roe	Right-handed pitcher	Lafayette High School (Lexington, Kentucky)	32§^{[h]}	
2006	Greg Reynolds	Right-handed pitcher	Stanford University (Stanford, California)	2	
2007	Casey Weathers	Right-handed pitcher	Vanderbilt University (Nashville, Tennessee)	8	
2008	Christian Friedrich	Left-handed pitcher	Eastern Kentucky University (Richmond, Kentucky)	25	
2009	Tyler Matzek	Left-handed pitcher	Capistrano Valley High School (Mission Viejo, California)	11	
2009	Timothy Wheeler	Outfielder	California State University, Sacramento (Sacramento, California)	32^{[i]}	
2009	Rex Brothers	Left-handed pitcher	Lipscomb University (Nashville, Tennessee)	34§^{[j]}	
2010	Kyle Parker	Outfielder	Clemson University (Clemson, South Carolina)	26	
2010	Peter Tago	Right-handed pitcher	Dana Hills High School (Dana Point, California)	47§^{[k]}	
2011	Tyler Anderson	Left-handed pitcher	University of Oregon (Eugene, Oregon)	20	
2011	Trevor Story	Shortstop	Irving High School (Irving, Texas)	45§^{[l]}	
2012	David Dahl	Outfielder	Oak Mountain High School (Birmingham, Alabama)	10	
2012	Eddie Butler	Right-handed pitcher	Radford University (Radford, Virginia)	46§^{[m]}	
2013	Jon Gray	Right-handed pitcher	University of Oklahoma (Norman, Oklahoma)	3	
2014	Kyle Freeland	Left-handed pitcher	University of Evansville (Evansville, Indiana)	8	
2014	Forrest Wall	Second baseman	Orangewood Christian School (Maitland, Florida)	35‡	
2015	Brendan Rodgers	Shortstop	Lake Mary High School (Lake Mary, Florida)	3	
2015	Mike Nikorak	Right-handed pitcher	Stroudsburg High School (Stroudsburg, Pennsylvania)	27§^{[n]}	
2015	Tyler Nevin	Third baseman	Poway High School (Poway, California)	38‡	
2016	Riley Pint	Right-handed pitcher	St. Thomas Aquinas High School (Overland Park, Kansas)	4	
2016	Robert Tyler	Right-handed pitcher	University of Georgia (Athens, Georgia)	38‡	
2018	Ryan Rolison	Left-handed pitcher	University of Mississippi (Oxford, Mississippi)	22	
2019	Michael Toglia	First baseman	University of California, Los Angeles (Los Angeles, California)	23	
2020	Zac Veen	Outfielder	Spruce Creek High School (Port Orange, Florida)	9	
2021	Benny Montgomery	Outfielder	Red Land High School (Lewisberry, Pennsylvania)	8	
2022	Gabriel Hughes	Right-handed pitcher	Gonzaga University (Spokane, Washington)	10	
2022	Sterlin Thompson	Outfielder	University of Florida (Gainesville, Florida)	31§^{[o]}	
2022	Jordan Beck	Outfielder	University of Tennessee (Knoxville, Tennessee)	38‡	
2023	Chase Dollander	Right-handed pitcher	University of Tennessee (Knoxville, Tennessee)	9	
2024	Charlie Condon	Outfielder	University of Georgia (Athens, Georgia)	3	
2025	Ethan Holliday	Shortstop	Stillwater High School (Stillwater, Oklahoma)	4	
2026	Tyler Bell	Shortstop	University of Kentucky (Lexington, Kentucky)	10	
2026	Daniel Jackson	Catcher	University of Georgia (Athens, Georgia)	37§	

== See also ==
- Colorado Rockies minor league players

== Footnotes ==
- ^{V} Through the 2012 draft, free agents were evaluated by the Elias Sports Bureau and rated "Type A", "Type B", or not compensation-eligible. If a team offered arbitration to a player but that player refused and subsequently signed with another team, the original team was able to receive additional draft picks. If a "Type A" free agent left in this way, his previous team received a supplemental pick and a compensatory pick from the team with which he signed. If a "Type B" free agent left in this way, his previous team received only a supplemental pick. Since the 2013 draft, free agents are no longer classified by type; instead, compensatory picks are only awarded if the team offered its free agent a contract worth at least the average of the 125 current richest MLB contracts. However, if the free agent's last team acquired the player in a trade during the last year of his contract, it is ineligible to receive compensatory picks for that player.
- ^{a} The Rockies lost their original first-round pick in 1998 to the Houston Astros as compensation for signing free agent Darryl Kile. The lost pick was the 17th overall selection.
- ^{b} The Rockies gained a compensatory first-round pick in 1998 from the Atlanta Braves for losing free agent Andrés Galarraga.
- ^{c} The Rockies gained a supplemental first-round pick in 1998 for losing free agent Andrés Galarraga.
- ^{d} The Rockies gained a supplemental first-round pick in 1998 for losing free agent Walt Weiss.
- ^{e} The Rockies lost their original first-round pick in 2001 to the New York Mets as compensation for signing free agent Mike Hampton. The lost pick was the 17th overall selection.
- ^{f} The Rockies gained a supplemental first-round pick in 2001 for failing to sign draft pick Matt Harrington.
- ^{g} Although Baseball-Reference shows Francis being drafted from the University of Lethbridge, MLB.com and several other media outlets report him as having been drafted out of the University of British Columbia.
- ^{h} The Rockies gained a supplemental first-round pick in 2005 for losing free agent Vinny Castilla.
- ^{i} The Rockies gained a compensatory first-round pick in 2009 from the Los Angeles Angels of Anaheim for losing free agent Brian Fuentes.
- ^{j} The Rockies gained a supplemental first-round pick in 2009 for losing free agent Brian Fuentes.
- ^{k} The Rockies gained a supplemental first-round pick in 2010 for losing free agent Jason Marquis.
- ^{l} The Rockies gained a supplemental first-round pick in 2011 for losing free agent Octavio Dotel.
- ^{m} The Rockies gained a supplemental first-round pick in 2012 for losing free agent Mark Ellis.
- ^{n} The Rockies gained a supplemental first-round pick in 2015 for losing free agent Michael Cuddyer.
- ^{n} The Rockies gained a supplemental first-round pick in 2022 for losing free agent Trevor Story.
