= Stroudsburg High School =

Public high school in Monroe County, Pennsylvania

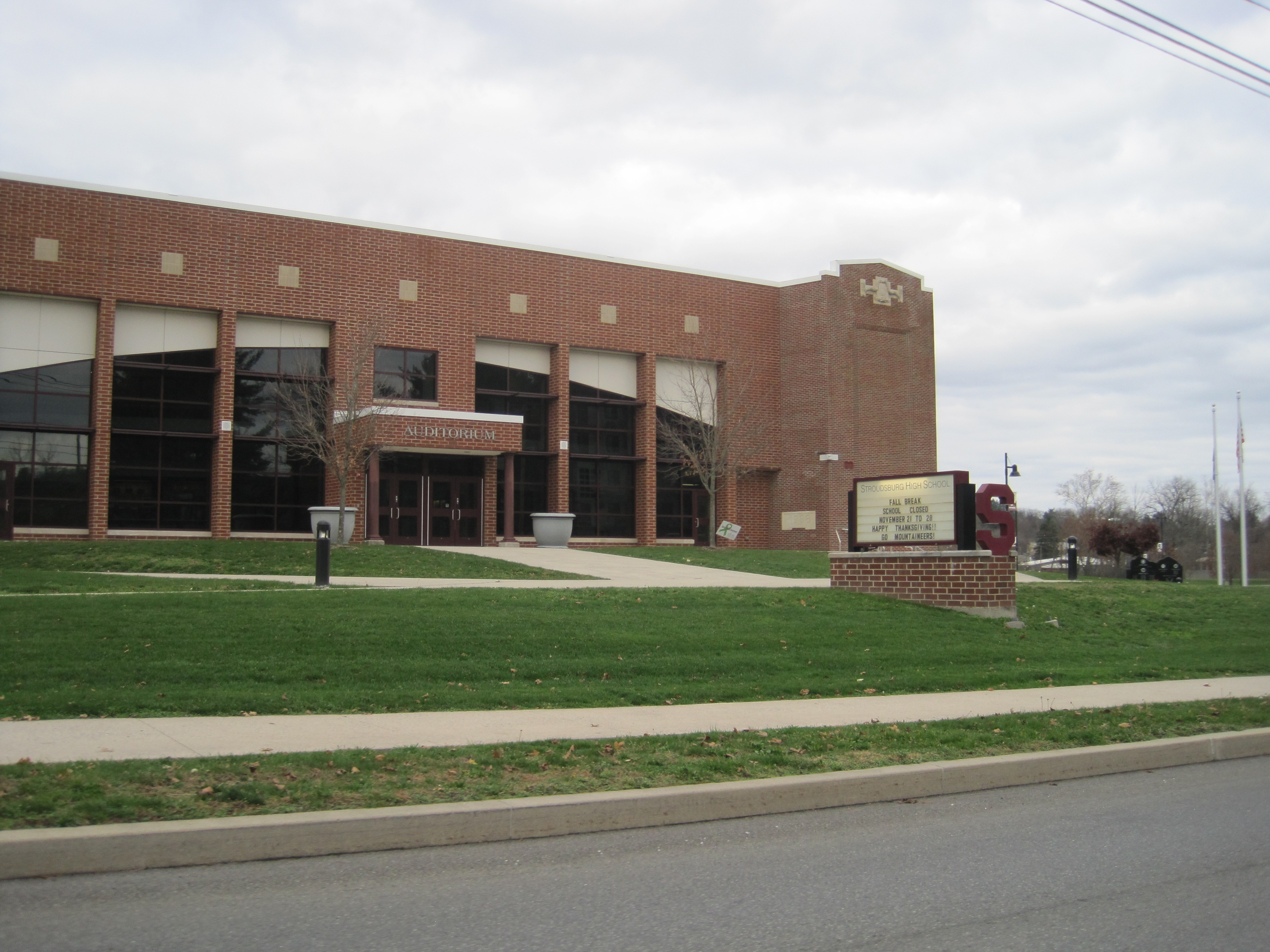
- School front entrance

Location
- 1100 West Main Street; Stroudsburg, Pennsylvania, U.S. 40.9841°N 75.2046°W

Information
- Type: Public high school
- School district: Stroudsburg Area School District
- NCES School ID: 422286003224
- Principal: Jeffrey Sodl
- Staff: 76.59 (on an FTE basis)
- Grades: 10–12
- Enrollment: 1,245 (as of 2023–24)
- Student to teacher ratio: 16.26
- Campus type: Suburb: Small
- Colors: Maroon and white
- Athletics conference: Eastern Pennsylvania Conference
- Team name: Mountaineers
- Rival: East Stroudsburg South High School
- Newspaper: Mountaineer
- Yearbook: Pioneer
- Website: https://high.sburg.org/

Stroudsburg High School is a public high school located in Stroudsburg in Monroe County, Pennsylvania. The school is part of the Stroudsburg Area School District. The school's mascot is the Mountaineers. As of 2023–24 school year, Stroudsburg High School has 1,245 students, according to National Center for Education Statistics data.

== History ==
In April 2008, facing an influx of new students, the district expressed the need for a new building. Residents had debated whether the current building should be renovated or whether a new building should be built to accommodate this growth. Members of the school board voted 5–4 in favor of renovating the existing high school on West Main Street.

In May 2008, the school district discovered that the current dress code which had formerly only banned the wearing of ripped or sagged jeans on boys, and the wearing of revealing clothes on girls, was being flagrantly violated. In response to this, it was proposed that there be a standardized dress policy consisting of khaki or black pants and skirts and polos in either black, white, or maroon. This policy was immensely unpopular among parents, teachers, and students alike and sparked an online protest group apply named Stroudsburg Students Against The Dress Code. This group produced little real protest besides making limited appearances at school district meetings and convincing students to wear black arm bands for a short period of time, the group was unsuccessful, and the policy went into effect on August 30, 2008.

Students questioned whether or not this new dress code was an infringement on their right to free speech. In large part, the dress code was reported to have increased problems rather than solving them because of its inability to define what was considered appropriate, and its ambiguous enforcement. In the spring of 2009, the administration released findings that showed the dress code had caused disciplinary referrals to decrease by 1000, but this recent statistic has been thrown into question by many staff members as well as students due to the fact that it did not include any of the violations for dress code. The figures from the past years, however, did include dress code violations, and there were many more violations in 2009.

As of January 2012, a newly built section was opened to students, which hosts its 4,000 capacity new gymnasium, a library and media center, new science labs, art rooms, workshops, and a film studio.

== Activities ==
Stroudsburg High School District offers an extensive number of clubs, activities, and an athletic program. These include such activities as student council, chess club, marching band, and yearbook committee. The school's quiz team has won the Scholastic Scrimmage three times in 1985, 2014, and 2016.

=== School newspaper ===
The school newspaper, The Mountaineer, is a recipient of the Pennsylvania School Press Association Gold Award for Overall Excellence. Its staff consistently receives high-ranking awards for its in-depth coverage of school and teen related topics. Its current adviser is Mr. Matthew Sobrinski. In the past, it was funded entirely through local advertisers and sold for fifty cents to the student body. However, in the 2007–2008 school year, school funding has allowed the staff to disseminate the periodical to every student in the building. Five issues are typically printed each year through the local newspaper, the Pocono Record. The front, center, and back are full color pages. The final issue of the year lists the future plans for all graduating seniors, whether they intend on continuing their education, joining a branch of the military, or obtaining a job.

== Athletics ==
Stroudsburg High School competes athletically in the Eastern Pennsylvania Conference (EPC) in the District XI division of the Pennsylvania Interscholastic Athletic Association, one of the premier high school athletic divisions in the nation. In 2007–08, Stroudsburg High School won the MVC Cup, a trophy for the best winning percentage in MVC games. All home football games, track meets, and occasional home boys and girls soccer games are held inside Ross-Stulgaitis Stadium, which was renamed for former head football coaches Fred Ross and Jerry Stulgaitis. The Varsity "S" Club raised funds to renovate the field with new artificial turf as well as a composite track. Teams include football, cross country, soccer, tennis, volleyball, field hockey, golf, cheerleading, basketball, swimming, wrestling, baseball, and softball.

== Notable alumni ==
- Rita Kogler Carver, artist
- George Gorse, art historian, Pomona College
- Sebastian Joseph-Day, professional football player, San Francisco 49ers
- Chris Neild, former professional football player, Houston Texans and Washington Redskins
- Mike Nikorak, former professional baseball player, Colorado Rockies
- Artie Owens, former professional football player, Buffalo Bill, New Orleans Saints, and San Diego Chargers
- Thomas P. Shoesmith, former U.S. ambassador to Malaysia
- Bob Stetler, former professional soccer player, Memphis Rogues, Phoenix Inferno, San Jose Earthquakes, Tampa Bay Rowdies, and Washington Diplomats
- Nathan Voorhis, NFL defensive end, New York Jets
- Alex Weekes, former professional soccer player, Pittsburgh Riverhounds SC and Pocono Snow
