= Chris Neild =

American football player (born 1987)

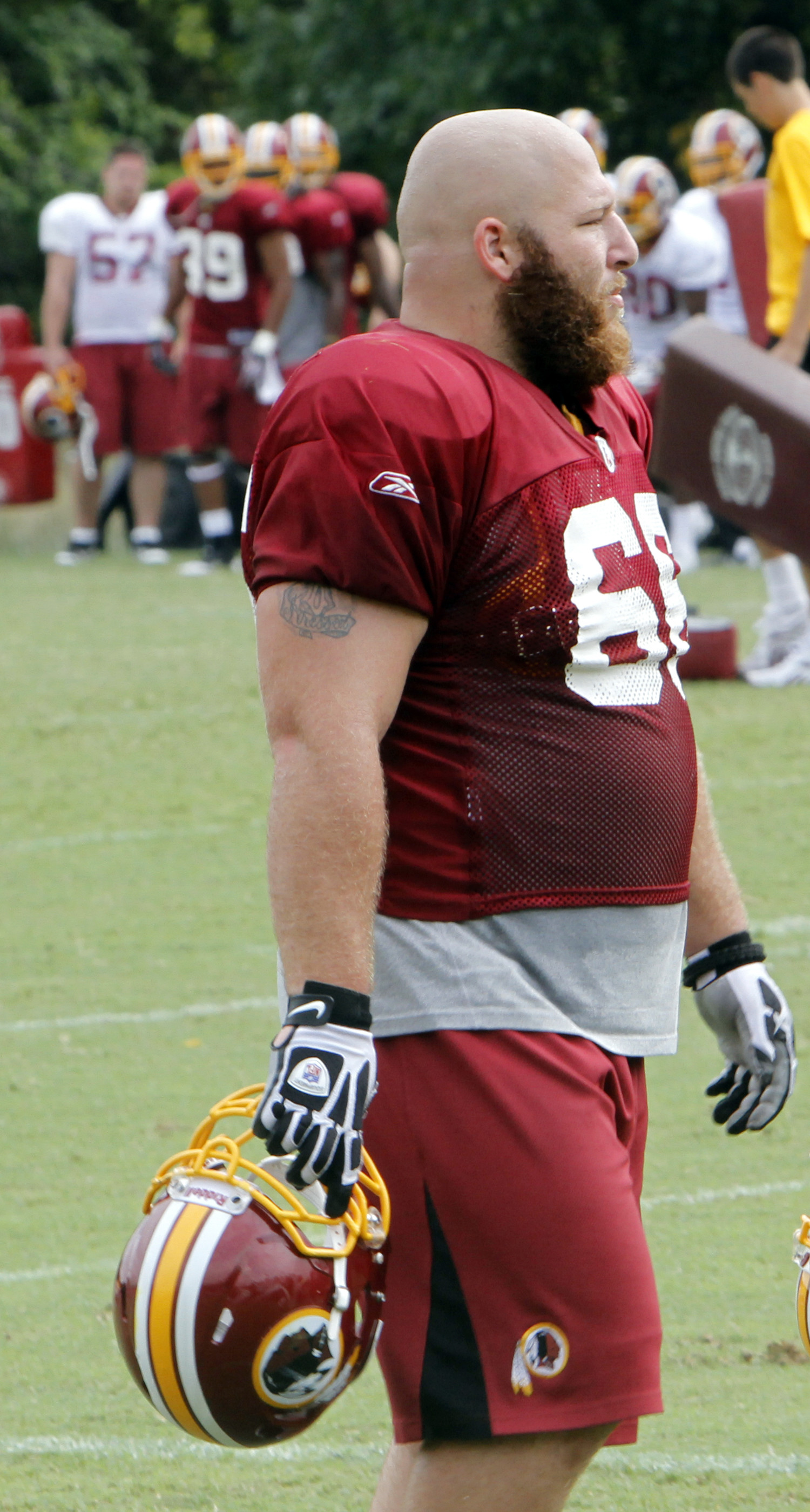
- Neild with the Washington Redskins in 2011

No. 95
- Position: Nose tackle

Personal information
- Born: December 1, 1987 (age 38); Cliffside Park, New Jersey, U.S.
- Listed height: 6 ft 2 in (1.88 m)
- Listed weight: 328 lb (149 kg)

Career information
- High school: Stroudsburg (Stroudsburg, Pennsylvania)
- College: West Virginia
- NFL draft: 2011: 7th round, 253rd overall pick

Career history
- Washington Redskins (2011–2014); Houston Texans (2015)*
- * Offseason or practice squad member only

Awards and highlights
- First-team All-Big East (2010)

Career NFL statistics
- Total tackles: 16
- Sacks: 2
- Stats at Pro Football Reference

Chris Neild (born December 1, 1987) is an American former professional football player who was a nose tackle in the National Football League (NFL). He was selected by the Washington Redskins in the seventh round of the 2011 NFL draft. He played college football for the West Virginia Mountaineers.

== Early life ==
Neild attended Stroudsburg High School in Stroudsburg, Pennsylvania.

== Professional career ==
Pre-draft measurables
Height	Weight	Arm length	Hand span	Wingspan	40-yard dash	10-yard split	20-yard split	20-yard shuttle	Three-cone drill	Vertical jump	Broad jump	Bench press
6 ft 1 3/4 in (1.87 m)	319 lb (145 kg)	31 7/8 in (0.81 m)	10 3/4 in (0.27 m)	6 ft 5 1/8 in (1.96 m)	5.11 s	1.71 s	2.99 s	4.46 s	7.35 s	29.0 in (0.74 m)	8 ft 10 in (2.69 m)	30 reps
All values from NFL Combine/Pro Day

=== Washington Redskins ===
Neild was selected 253rd overall in the seventh round of the 2011 NFL draft by the Washington Redskins. He was converted from a defensive tackle to a nose tackle. Neild made his NFL debut in Week 1 against the New York Giants, where he recorded 1.5 sacks on Eli Manning. In the 2011 season, Neild played in all 16 games as the backup nose tackle for Barry Cofield.

In 2012, Neild was expected to compete for a roster spot with Chris Baker. His second season was cut short after tearing the anterior cruciate ligament in his left knee during practice on August 13, 2012. The Redskins waived-injured him two days later. After not being claimed off waivers, Neild was officially placed on the team's injured reserve list.

During the 2013 season, Neild returned to being the back-up nose tackle and played a total of eight games.

In the last 2014 preseason game against the Tampa Bay Buccaneers, Neild suffered an injury in his right leg and was carted off the field. On August 30, 2014, it was confirmed that he tore his right ACL and was placed on the team's injured reserve.

=== Houston Texans ===
Neild signed with the Houston Texans on July 31, 2015. He was waived on August 31, 2015.
