= Steven Curfman =

American soccer player

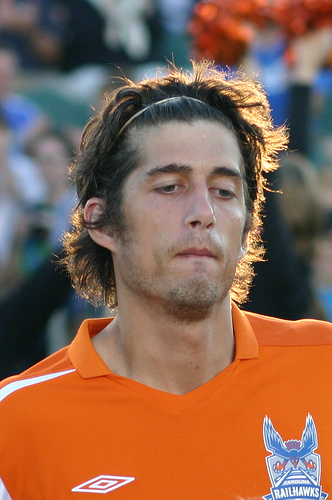

Personal information
- Date of birth: October 8, 1986 (age 40)
- Place of birth: Manassas, Virginia, United States
- Height: 5 ft 11 in (1.80 m)
- Position: Midfielder

Youth career
- 2003–2004: US U-17 Residency Program
- 2003–2006: Wake Forest Demon Deacons

Senior career*
Years	Team	Apps	(Gls)
2004–2005	Raleigh CASL Elite	7	(2)
2007	Real Salt Lake	0	(0)
2008	Carolina RailHawks	30	(2)
2009	Wilmington Hammerheads	16	(1)
2010–2012	CASL Elite		

International career^{‡}
2003	United States U-17	3	(1)
2004	United States U-20	3	(0)

Managerial career
- 2014–: North Carolina FC (youth)
- * Club domestic league appearances and goals as of June 16, 2010 ‡ National team caps and goals as of 2 April 2010

Steven Curfman (born October 8, 1986) is an American former soccer player who is currently a youth coach for North Carolina FC.

== Career ==
=== College and amateur ===
Curfman grew up in Raleigh, North Carolina, attended Athens Drive High School and played club soccer with the Capital Area Soccer League before being selected to the U.S. Soccer U-17 Residency Program in Bradenton, Florida in 2002. He was also selected as a McDonald's and Parade Magazine All-American in 2003.

Curfman played college soccer at Wake Forest University, where he was a four-year letterman under coach Jay Vidovich. In 2003, his freshman season, he started 13 games and appeared in 20, and scored nine goals and 13 assists, which earned him a spot on the All-ACC Freshman team. In his sophomore season, he started 17 games and appeared in 18 and scored 1 goal and four assists. In 2005, he started 20 games and scored 5 goals and 3 assists before suffering a knee injury prior to the NCAA Tournament. He was named to the All-ACC Tournament team and All-ACC Academic Team. During his senior season, he led the squad in games played (23), assists (8), point (20), and shots (50), and 2nd in goals (6), in helping his team reach the #1 ranking, the ACC regular season co-championship, and the school's first-ever appearance in the Men's NCAA College Cup.

During his college years he also played with Raleigh CASL Elite in the USL Premier Development League.

=== Professional ===
Curfman was drafted in the third round (30th overall) of the 2007 MLS SuperDraft by Real Salt Lake, whose coach John Ellinger had been his coach during the U-17 residency program. Curfman saw no playing time with Salt Lake, and was released at the end of the season.

On March 7, 2008, it was announced that Curfman had been signed by his hometown USL First Division team, the Carolina Railhawks. He scored in his first game with the RailHawks, a 1–1 tie with the Atlanta Silverbacks on April 19, 2008, and went on to make 30 appearances before being released in March 2009. He signed with the Wilmington Hammerheads of the USL Second Division in April 2009, and played for the team throughout the 2009 season until the team folded at the end of the year.

Curfman played the amateur team CASL Elite in the Lamar Hunt U.S. Open Cup in 2010; his team won their regional qualification group (which also featured NPSL teams FC Tulsa and Atlanta FC) before falling 4–2 to USL Second Division pro side Charleston Battery in the first round of tournament proper.

=== International ===
Curfman was selected to U.S. roster for the 2003 FIFA U-17 World Championship in Finland, where he started three matches, and scored his first international goal against South Korea on August 14, 2003. In 2004, he earned three caps, starting one game, with the United States U-20 men's national soccer team.

== Honors ==
=== Wilmington Hammerheads ===
- USL Second Division Regular Season Champions: 2009
