= Sean Rush =

American soccer player (born 1985)

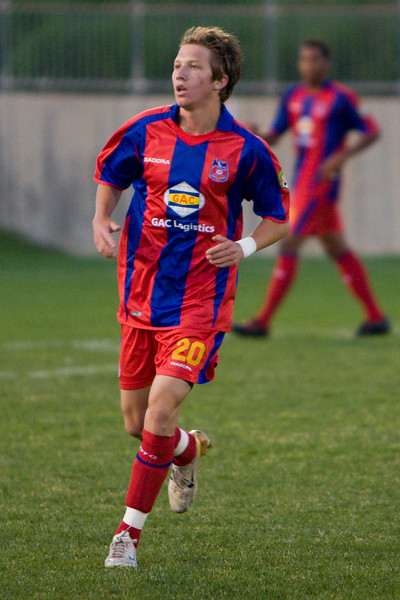

Personal information
- Full name: Sean Patrick Rush
- Date of birth: February 27, 1985 (age 41)
- Place of birth: Baltimore, Maryland, United States
- Height: 5 ft 9 in (1.75 m)
- Position: Midfielder

Youth career
- 2001–2005: Baltimore Bays
- 2005–2006: Venezia
- 2006–2007: Treviso

Senior career*
Years	Team	Apps	(Gls)
2006–2007	Treviso	0	(0)
2007–2008	Crystal Palace Baltimore	12	(1)
2008	Osvaldo Cruz	0	(0)
2009	Real Maryland Monarchs	16	(1)
2009	Vila Meã	9	(0)
2010	Real Maryland Monarchs	11	(1)
2010	Ribeirão	0	(0)
- * Club domestic league appearances and goals as of September 15, 2010

Sean Patrick Rush (born February 27, 1985, in Baltimore, Maryland) is an American soccer player who last played for Ribeirão in the Portuguese Second Division.

== Career ==
=== Youth ===
Rush grew up through the ranks of Baltimore Football Club, before the club merged with Baltimore Bays. Rush won state, regional, and national titles with both teams. On a select trip to Italy, including a match against Milan at the Nereo Rocco Cup, Rush was invited by Milan's Franco Baresi to join their youth squad, but could not sign due to regulations. Rush returned to Italy, leaving school behind in the United States on the word of his agent.

=== Professional ===
At age 19, Rush became only the second American to be signed by a team in Italy's top two divisions, Serie B side Treviso – the first was Alexi Lalas who played for Padova. In 2007, the coaching staff was changed, bringing in an entirely new outfit. Rush and a few others who were expected to be a part of the next season were not offered another deal.

Rush signed for Crystal Palace Baltimore of the USL Second Division for their inaugural 2007 season. Rush scored an important goal in the 92nd minute against New Hampshire on July 21, 2007, to keep Palace's playoff hopes alive.

After one season at Palace, Rush decided to take the advice of a close friend and went to Brazil to play, subsequently spending the year with Osvaldo Cruz in the Campeonato Paulista Serie A3.

Rush signed to play with Real Maryland Monarchs on February 10, 2009. Starting and playing 80 minutes of the season opener against Bermuda Hogges, He scored the first goal of the season in the second minute of play. Rush Tallied 1 goal and 5 assists in 2009, he played in 16 games before leaving early to play in Europe.

Following conclusion of the 2009 USL2 regular season, Rush went on trial and after three days signed a yearlong contract with Portuguese side Vila Meã. Rush made his first appearance in the 3–0 win over AD Olivereanse.

In April 2010, Rush announced he would be signing back with Real Maryland Monarchs under head coach Anthony Hudson. For two consecutive seasons, Rush scored the seasons first goal for Real Maryland.

In September 2010, Rush signed a yearlong contract with Ribeirão of the Portuguese Second Division.

== Personal ==
Rush is the Owner and founder of Pipeline International Soccer Academy, an American-based training academy for youths playing soccer. Sean Rush and Santino Quaranta have started a non-profit premier soccer club in Baltimore, MD called Pipeline Soccer Club. Rush holds an Irish passport, His great-grandfather, grandfather, and father all played the game at different levels. He was born and raised in Baltimore, Maryland, with his older brother, William, and his younger sisters, Dani and Kelly. They all attended Dulaney High School in Timonium, Maryland.

== Career statistics ==
(correct as of 23 September 2008)

Club	Season	League			Cup			Play-offs			Total		
Club	Season	Apps	Goals	Assists	Apps	Goals	Assists	Apps	Goals	Assists	Apps	Goals	Assists
Treviso	2006	0	0	0	0	0	0	–	–	–	0	0	0
Crystal Palace Baltimore	2007	12	1	1	0	0	0	0	0	0	12	1	1
Osvaldo Cruz	2008	2	0	0	0	0	0	0	0	0	0	0	0
Real Maryland Monarchs	2009	16	3	5	2	0	0	0	0	0	18	1	3
Vila Meã	2009/10	9	0	1	1	0	0	0	0	0	10	0	0
Real Maryland Monarchs	2010	11	1	0	2	0	0	0	0	0	0	0	0
Ribeirão	2010-	0	0	0	0	0	0	0	0	0	0	0	0
Career total	2006–2010	82	12	7	6	0	0	0	0	0	38	2	4
