= Alex Weekes =

American soccer player

Personal information
- Full name: Alexander Thacher Weekes
- Date of birth: March 20, 1988 (age 38)
- Place of birth: Stroudsburg, Pennsylvania, United States
- Height: 5 ft 11 in (1.80 m)
- Position: Midfielder

Youth career
- 2006–2009: Colgate Raiders

Senior career*
Years	Team	Apps	(Gls)
2009	Pocono Snow		
2010	Pittsburgh Riverhounds SC	18	(4)
- * Club domestic league appearances and goals as of August 25, 2010

Alex Weekes (born March 20, 1988) is an American soccer player who last played for Pittsburgh Riverhounds in the USL Second Division.

== Career ==
=== College and amateur ===
Weekes attended Stroudsburg High School, played club soccer for Stroudsburg United AC Perugia, and played four years of college soccer at Colgate University. He led the Raiders in scoring during both the 2008 and 2009 seasons, was a two-time All-League selection (earning first team honors as a senior in 2009), and also in 2009 became the first Colgate player to be named to the Hermann Trophy Watch List.

During his college years Weekes also played for Pocono Snow in the National Premier Soccer League, alongside his Riverhounds teammate Matthew Baker.

=== Professional ===
Weekes turned professional in 2010 when he signed to play for the Pittsburgh Riverhounds in the USL Second Division. He made his professional debut on April 17, 2010, in the team's 2010 season opener against the Real Maryland Monarchs. He scored his first professional goal on June 15, 2010, in a US Open Cup first round match against Detroit United.
