= Tim Merritt =

American soccer player (born 1982)

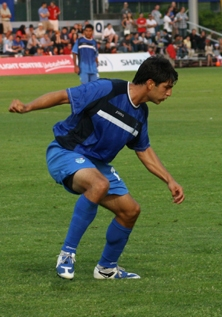

Personal information
- Date of birth: June 28, 1982 (age 44)
- Place of birth: Gig Harbor, Washington, United States
- Height: 6 ft 0 in (1.83 m)
- Position: Defender

Team information
- Current team: CASL Elite

College career
Years	Team	Apps	(Gls)
2001–2004	North Carolina Tar Heels		

Senior career*
Years	Team	Apps	(Gls)
2003	Boulder Rapids Reserve	16	(0)
2004	Carolina Dynamo	18	(7)
2005	D.C. United	0	(0)
2006–2007	FSV Oggersheim	40	(1)
2008	Seattle Wolves		
2009	Miami FC	24	(1)
2010–	CASL Elite		
- * Club domestic league appearances and goals as of June 16, 2010

Tim Merritt (born June 28, 1982, in Gig Harbor, Washington) is an American soccer player who currently plays for USASA amateur team CASL Elite.

== Career ==
=== High school and college ===
Merritt attended Bellarmine Preparatory School and played college soccer at the University of North Carolina from 2001 to 2004. Merritt was a two-time second-team All-ACC selection at defender for Carolina and was a member of the Tar Heels’ 2001 NCAA Championship team. He scored 10 goals and had 11 assists for 31 points over his collegiate career.

During his college years he also played with Carolina Dynamo in the USL Premier Development League, and was named to the PDL All-Central Conference team in 2004.

=== Professional ===
Merritt was drafted in the fourth round (48th overall) 2005 MLS SuperDraft by D.C. United. Merritt made only one appearance with United's regular squad but was a strong contributor to the reserve team's inaugural MLS Reserve Division championship in 2005.

Merritt spent the next two years playing abroad in Germany with FSV Oggersheim. At FSV Oggersheim, Merritt helped the club win promotion to the Regionalliga Süd in 2007. In his two years with the club, he compiled 40 appearances while tallying 1 goal and 6 assists.

After suffering a knee injury while playing in Germany, Merritt returned to the United States in 2008. While recovering, he played with the amateur Seattle Wolves in the South Puget Sound League, and having trialed with the San Jose Earthquakes during pre-season, Merritt signed with Miami FC in 2009. He went on to play 24 games and score one goal for Miami before choosing to retire from professional soccer and pursue other career opportunities at the end of the season.
