= Richard Perdomo =

Honduran-American footballer (born 1985)

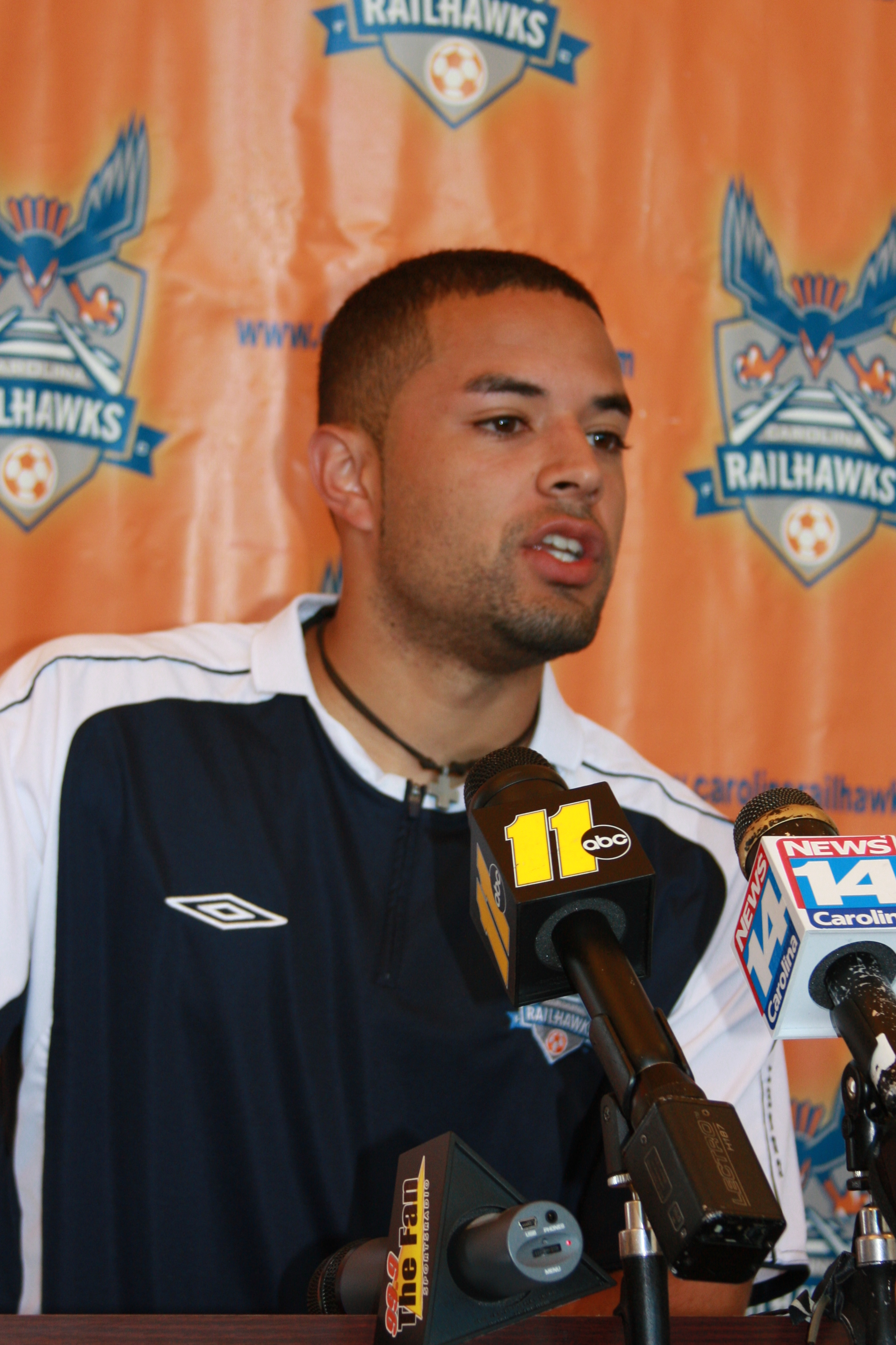
- Perdomo with the Carolina RailHawks in 2008

Personal information
- Full name: Richard Perdomo
- Date of birth: October 1, 1985 (age 41)
- Place of birth: Miami, Florida, United States
- Height: 5 ft 8 in (1.73 m)
- Position: Defender

College career
Years	Team	Apps	(Gls)
2004–2005	Creighton Bluejays		
2006–2007	Mercer Bears		

Senior career*
Years	Team	Apps	(Gls)
2008	Carolina RailHawks	10	(0)
2009	Miami FC	8	(1)
2009	Platense	3	(0)
- * Club domestic league appearances and goals as of 19 October 2009

Richard Perdomo (born October 1, 1985) is an American soccer player of Honduran heritage.

== Club career ==
=== College ===
Perdomo attended Gulliver Preparatory School, and played college soccer at Creighton University for two years before transferring to Mercer University for his junior and senior seasons.

=== Professional ===
On March 12, 2008, Perdomo signed with the Carolina RailHawks of the USL First Division. He gained his first start in a 1–1 tie with the Atlanta Silverbacks on April 19, 2008. In 2009, Perdomo moved to Miami FC.

On June 12, 2009, Perdomo scored his first professional goal in 3–2 loss to Vancouver Whitecaps FC in Vancouver. In July 2009, Miami sold Perdomo's contract to Honduras First Division Club Deportivo Platense. He was released by Platense after the 2009 Apertura season,

=== Post-professional ===
In 2018, Perdomo captained the KITH Flamingos playing in the West Kendall Premier League.

== International career ==
Despite being born in the United States, Perdomo has Honduran heritage, and has trained with the Honduras national football team.

== Coaching career ==
He has been a youth soccer coach at Weston FC since 2011, following a season at Kendall Soccer Coalition.
