= Phillip Long =

American soccer player

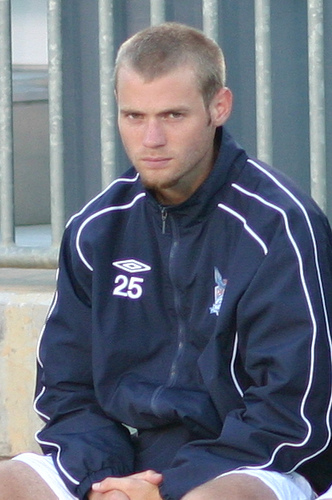

Personal information
- Date of birth: May 16, 1983 (age 43)
- Place of birth: Oklahoma City, United States
- Height: 5 ft 8 in (1.73 m)
- Position: Midfielder

Team information
- Current team: Carolina RailHawks
- Number: 25

Youth career
- 2002–2004: University of Virginia

Senior career*
Years	Team	Apps	(Gls)
2007–2008	Carolina RailHawks	30	(1)
- * Club domestic league appearances and goals as of September 30, 2008

Phillip Long (born May 16, 1983, in Oklahoma City, Oklahoma) is an American soccer midfielder who spent two seasons with the Carolina Railhawks of the USL First Division.

== High school and college ==
He attended Hunt High School in Wilson, North Carolina, graduating in 2002. He was named the North Carolina Soccer Coaches Association's male soccer player of the year for 2001 (an award that was awarded in 1996 to his future teammate Caleb Norkus). He was also named a McDonald's High School All-American in soccer for the 2001–2002 season, being named the 2002 McDonald's All American Games MVP. He attended the University of Virginia where he played for the Cavaliers in 2002 to 2004. In 2002, he played in 14 games with 4 goals scored. In 2003, he played in 13 games with 1 goal scored.

== Professional ==
In 2007, Long attended try outs with the expansion Carolina Railhawks of the USL First Division. He impressed the coaches enough to be offered a contract and signed for the 2007 season. Long scored a goal in the team's first franchise win against MLS club Chivas USA.
