= Chris McClellan (soccer) =

American soccer player (born 1981)

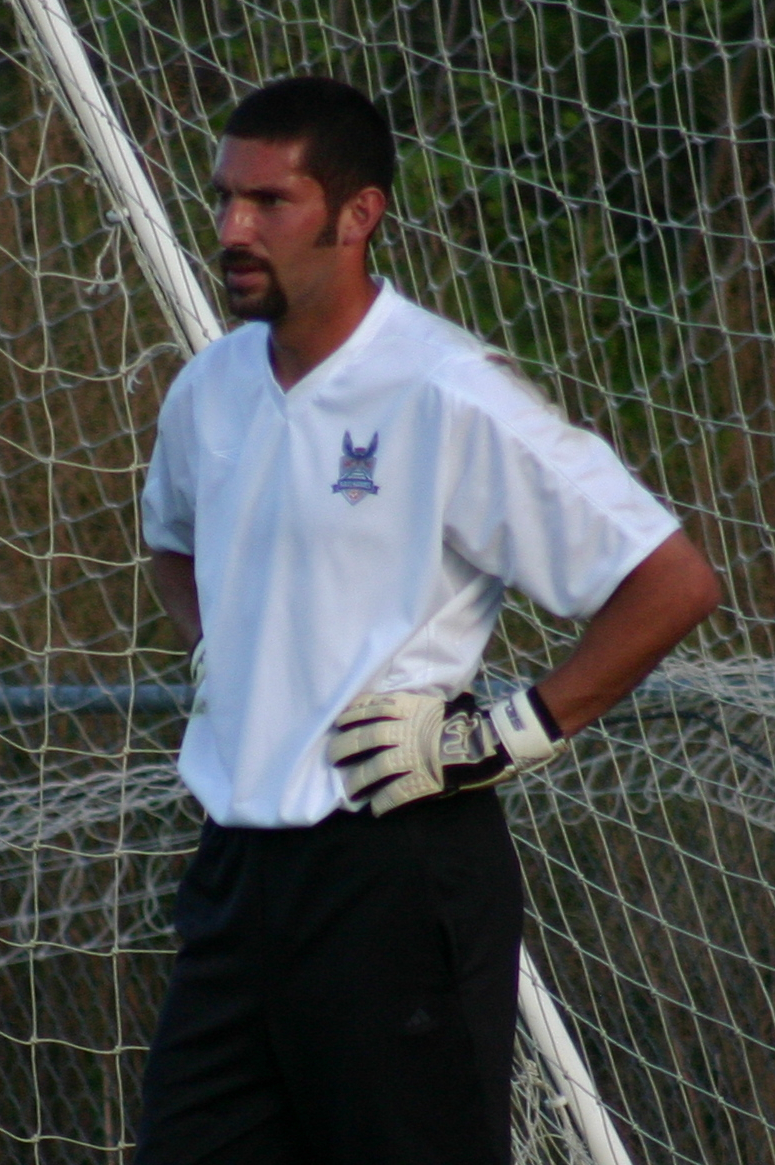

Personal information
- Date of birth: May 9, 1981 (age 45)
- Place of birth: Boulder, Colorado, United States
- Height: 6 ft 0 in (1.83 m)
- Position: Goalkeeper

Team information
- Current team: CASL Elite

Youth career
- 1999–2002: Colorado Christian Cougars

Senior career*
Years	Team	Apps	(Gls)
2003–2006	Charlotte Eagles	39	(0)
2007–2008	Carolina RailHawks	57	(0)
2009	Puerto Rico Islanders	1	(0)
2009	Wilmington Hammerheads	5	(0)
2009	→ Charleston Battery (loan)	2	(0)
2010–	CASL Elite		
- * Club domestic league appearances and goals as of June 16, 2010

Chris McClellan (born May 9, 1981) is an American soccer player who currently plays for USASA amateur team CASL Elite.

== Career ==
=== Youth and college ===
McClellan played college soccer at Colorado Christian University where he still holds the single season records for most saves (145 in 2002) and goals against average (1.44 in 1999) as well as the career records for saves (486), goals against average (1.60), and shutouts (14). In 2008, McClellan was inducted into the Colorado Christian University Hall of Fame. In addition to the Hall of Fame nomination, McClellan was also named in 2009 to the Rocky Mountain Athletic Conference All-Century Men's Soccer team

=== Professional ===
In 2003, McClellan signed with the Charlotte Eagles of the USL Second Division. In 2005, he backstopped the Eagles to the USL-2 title after taking over starting goalkeeper duties when Trevor Upton was injured. In August 2005, USL named McClellan its USL-2 Goalkeeper of the Year. On April 5, 2007, the Carolina RailHawks announced they had signed McClellan.

Initially expected to be a backup keeper, McClellen impressed the coaching staff and became the starting goalkeeper. He held the RailHawks starting position for two seasons, but left the team following the 2008 season to sign with the Puerto Rico Islanders of USL-1. In July 2009, McClelland moved to the Wilmington Hammerheads of the USL Second Division. After the USL-2 season concluded, he finished the regular season and playoff with USL-1 sided Charleston Battery, playing in 3 games total.

McClellan played the amateur team CASL Elite in the Lamar Hunt U.S. Open Cup in 2010; his team won their regional qualification group (which also featured NPSL teams FC Tulsa and Atlanta FC) before falling 4–2 to USL Second Division pro side Charleston Battery in the first round of tournament proper.
