= Kevin Cornwall =

Irish footballer (born 1988)

Personal information
- Date of birth: 16 May 1988 (age 38)
- Place of birth: Dublin, Ireland
- Position: Forward

Team information
- Current team: Vanguard University of Southern California

Senior career*
Years	Team	Apps	(Gls)
2006–2007	St Patrick's Athletic	4	(0)
2008	Shelbourne	0	(0)
2009–	Glebe North		
- * Club domestic league appearances and goals

Kevin Cornwall (born 16 May 1988) is an Irish footballer who plays for Vanguard University of Southern California. Cornwall plays as a centre forward.

== Career ==
Cornwall joined St. Patrick's Athletic under 21 squad in the summer of 2006 and quickly established himself in the team. His performances caught the eye of John McDonnell who gave Kevin his first appearance for the senior squad in a league fixture against Sligo Rovers in the Showgrounds. He made 3 further league appearances for the Saints during the 2007 season and scored his first senior goal for the Saints in a 4-0 FAI Cup 2nd round victory against Phoenix FC on 15 June 2007. Also during the 2007 season, Cornwall was once again part of St. Patrick's Athletic's under 21 squad that finished runners-up in that seasons Dr. Tony O'Neill League, losing to UCD on penalties after a scoreless draw after extra time.

Cornwall departed St. Patrick's Athletic at the end of the 2007 campaign and joined rival Dublin club Shelbourne on 27 February 2008. He made his Shelbourne debut as a second-half substitute during an Eircom League Cup 1st round tie on 24 March 2008 against Sporting Fingal at Morton Stadium, a match Shelbourne won 6–5 on penalties after a 2–2 draw after extra-time.

Cornwall departed Shelbourne in July 2008 and later joined Leinster Senior League Senior Division club Glebe North.
