= Nathan Zuzga =

American soccer player

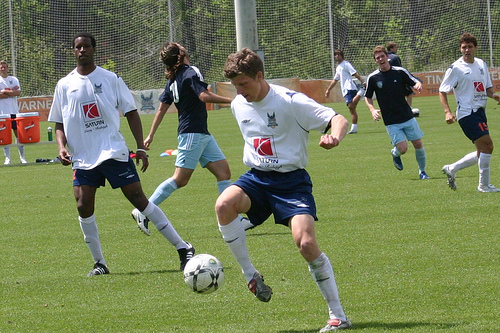

Personal information
- Date of birth: January 8, 1985 (age 41)
- Place of birth: Troy, Michigan, United States
- Height: 6 ft 0 in (1.83 m)
- Position: Forward

Youth career
- 2003–2006: Catawba College

Senior career*
Years	Team	Apps	(Gls)
2007	Michigan Bucks	0	(0)
2008	Carolina RailHawks	2	(0)
- * Club domestic league appearances and goals

Nathan Zuzga is a retired American soccer forward who played one season for the Carolina RailHawks in the USL First Division.

== High school and college ==
Zuzga attended Troy High School where he was an All State soccer player. In 2002, his high school team took fourth in the Michigan State High School soccer tournament. Zuzga then attended Catawba College from 2003 to 2006. While at Catawba Zuzga was three-time All Region, four-time All Conference, two-time All State, three-time SAC Tournament Team and two-time MVP. Zuzga set a school record for NCAA Tournament goals and points.

== Professional ==
In 2007, he tried out with the expansion Carolina RailHawks of the USL First Division, but was not offered a contract. He then spent the 2007 season with the Michigan Bucks of the Premier Development League. During that time, he played only Open Cup, but saw no time in league games. On April 16, 2008, the RailHawks announced they had signed him for the 2008 season. He played two games for the RailHawks during the 2008 season but was not offered a contract for the 2009 season.
