= Caleb Norkus =

American soccer player

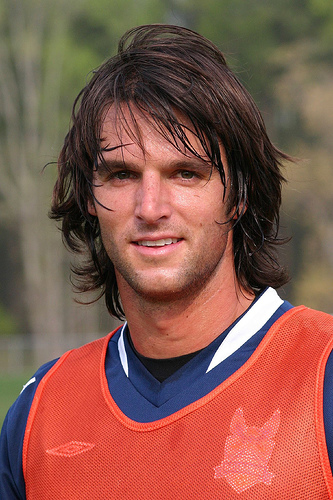

Personal information
- Full name: Joshua Caleb Norkus
- Date of birth: March 14, 1979 (age 47)
- Place of birth: Raleigh, North Carolina, U.S.
- Height: 6 ft 0 in (1.83 m)
- Position: Defender

College career
Years	Team	Apps	(Gls)
1997–2000	North Carolina Tar Heels		

Senior career*
Years	Team	Apps	(Gls)
2000	Boulder Nova		
2001–2002	Charlotte Eagles	49	(6)
2003	Sportfreunde Siegen	7	(1)
2004	Richmond Kickers	9	(0)
2004	Charleston Battery	4	(0)
2004–2005	Unión Española	16	(1)
2005–2006	Puerto Rico Islanders	22	(6)
2007–2010	Carolina RailHawks	57	(3)
2010	→ Charleston Battery (loan)	1	(0)
2012	Puerto Rico Islanders	3	(0)
2014	Puerto Rico Bayamón	0	(0)

International career^{‡}
1995	United States U17	2	(0)
- * Club domestic league appearances and goals as of 28 July 2021 ‡ National team caps and goals as of 28 July 2021

Joshua Caleb Norkus (born March 14, 1979) is an American former soccer player. He played professionally in Germany, Chile, Puerto Rico and the United States. He was a member of the United States U-17 men's national soccer team at the 1995 FIFA U-17 World Championship held in Quito, Ecuador, as well as the United States U-18 men's national soccer team and the United States U-20 men's national soccer team.

== Career ==
=== College and amateur ===
Caleb, who was nicknamed PlayStation by the Puerto Rico Islanders supporters for his tireless work rate, grew up playing youth soccer for the Capital Area Soccer League and was North Carolina High School player of the year in 1996 when he helped lead Sanderson High School to the North Carolina State title. During this time, he was also a member of the U17 and U18 United States men's national soccer team where he played alongside Tim Howard, Steve Cherundolo, Carlos Bocanegra and Chris Albright.

Norkus played for the University of North Carolina at Chapel Hill from 1997 to 2000. In 2000, in the most exciting 13 seconds of college soccer, a play that involved a 50-yard pass, three headers and a volley, Caleb scored the golden goal to bring the Tar Heels the Atlantic Coast Conference tournament title. Later in 2000, he played for the Boulder Nova of the Premier Development League.

=== Professional ===
Norkus was drafted by D.C. United in the fifth round of 2001 MLS SuperDraft. Although he trained with the team, Caleb did not catch on with the MLS side and later signed with Charlotte Eagles of the then United Soccer Leagues A-League.

After two seasons with the Eagles, Norkus moved to Sportfreunde Siegen of the German Regionalliga-Süd (German 3rd Division). In 2004, Caleb returned to the United States with the Richmond Kickers of USL First Division (at the time) but transferred midseason to Charleston Battery of the same league. At the end of that season, Norkus took an opportunity to play in the Primera División de Chile with Unión Española and helped the team to the 2005 Apertura title.

At the conclusion of the Chilean 2005 Apertura, Norkus moved to Puerto Rico Islanders of USL-1 for the remainder of the USL 2005 season. In 2006, Norkus season got off to a brilliant start as he scored 4 goals in the Islanders' first 10 games before being sidelined with a sports hernia injury. After off-season surgery in Argentina, Norkus returned to the States to sign with the expansion Carolina RailHawks of USL-1.

Throughout Norkus' career, he has continually struggled with a series of unfortunate injuries which have limited his playing time and tenure at many of the clubs he has played for professionally. However, in his 2007 season after having surgery to correct a groin injury his fitness was not an issue. He played for the RailHawks through the 2010 season, going on loan to the Charleston Battery for one game at the end of the season. The following season, he accepted a role as player-coach for the Carolina RailHawks.

Norkus' coaching career began during his early years at the University of North Carolina at Chapel Hill, where he began leading sessions at both the men's and women's summer camps. Throughout his playing career, Norkus coached youth soccer in multiple settings, including Charlotte Christian Academy's men's varsity program in 2002 and the Capital Area Soccer League, beginning in 2006. In 2009, Norkus obtained his US Soccer Federation (USSF) National B coaching license. After ending the 2010 season as a full-time player, Norkus became Community Outreach Liaison and Youth Soccer Ambassador for the Carolina RailHawks and the Capital Area Soccer League. He continued in this role until he relocated to Puerto Rico, joining the Puerto Rico Islanders as a player-coach for the remainder of their final season in 2012. He also held the title of Community Outreach & Fan Development Manager for the team during this period.

==== Controversy ====
Puerto Rico Islanders President Andy Guillemard-Noble accused the RailHawks of piracy in the signing of Norkus, who was out of contract with the Islanders after the 2006 season. While the club executive insists that the Islanders had a verbal agreement with Norkus to return to Puerto Rico for the 2007 season, the player refutes that accusation, saying the two sides never reached terms and cites the lack of an offered written contract as evidence of their lack of agreement.

=== International ===
Norkus made two appearances for the United States at the 1995 FIFA U-17 World Championship's played at Atahualpa Stadium in Quito, Ecuador. As a member of the U-15, U-17, and U-19 National Teams, Norkus played in over 40 international games in the Caribbean and Europe. During the summer of 1997, he won the MVP Trophy at the Voreppe Tournament in Paris, France, and was subsequently invited to a try-out with Anderlecht of Belgium's Premier League.

== Honors ==
=== Club ===
Unión Española

- Primera División de Chile (1): 2005 Apertura
