= Real Maryland F.C. =

- Full name: Real Maryland Football Club
- Nickname: The Monarchs
- Founded: 2007
- Stadium: Lester Stadium; Rockville, Maryland
- Capacity: 5,000
- Owner: (Spain) Victor Moran
- General Manager: (United States) David Noyes
- Head Coach: (Spain) Silvino Gonzalo
- League: USL League Two
- 2012: 2nd, South Atlantic; Playoffs: Quarter Finals
- Website: http://www.realmaryland.us/
Home colors	Away colors

Real Maryland F.C., commonly known as the Real Maryland Monarchs, was an American soccer team based in Rockville, Maryland, United States. Founded in 2007, the team played the majority of its existence in the USL Premier Deveuppuntil ment League (PDL), the fourth tier of the American Soccer Pyramid, in the South Atlantic Division of the Eastern Conference, having voluntarily self-relegated from The team suspended operations after the 2012 season.

From 2009 to 2012, the team played its home games at Roy Lester Stadium on the campus of Richard Montgomery High School. The team's colors are white, gold and black. The team's nickname, the Monarchs or "Los Monarcas", is intended to reflect the state of Maryland's colonial roots under Lords Calvert and Baltimore.

In addition to the professional team, the club fielded a team in the USL's Super-20 League, a league for players 17 to 20 years of age run under the United Soccer Leagues umbrella. The club also fielded four teams in the USL's Super Y-League, with teams in the U14, U15, U16, and U17 divisions.

== History ==
Real Maryland was launched in July 2007 as an expansion franchise joining the USL Second Division in 2008. The club's majority owner, Victor Moran, named the club Real Maryland because he intended "to create a REAL event, not just a soccer game", and hired former Northern Virginia Royals head coach Silvino Gonzalo to lead his team in its inaugural campaign.

The Monarchs played their first official game on April 20, 2008, a 1–0 loss to the Western Mass Pioneers, but secured their first ever victory the following week with a 2–0 win over the Pittsburgh Riverhounds; the first goal in franchise history was scored by Bill Brindley. Unfortunately, the Monarchs' first season in USL2 was a difficult one, despite the on-field presence of former Salvadoran internationals Dennis Alas and Ronald Cerritos. They secured two more victories in May, 3–2 over the Cleveland City Stars and 2–1 over the Wilmington Hammerheads, but after conceding a last minute goal to lose 2–1 at home to Cleveland on June 8, fell apart thereafter, and by mid-season were already adrift at the bottom of the standings. Head coach Gonzalo was replaced by Antonio Carlos Vieira in July, but he could do nothing to halt the slide. They suffered several embarrassing defeats towards the end of the regular season, losing 4–0 to the Harrisburg City Islanders, 5–2 to the Wilmington Hammerheads, 6–0 to the Richmond Kickers, and 8–0 to the Charlotte Eagles, their worst result of the season. A 1–1 tie with the Pittsburgh Riverhounds on the last day of the regular season did little to brighten the mood at the Maryland Soccer Plex, as the Monarchs finished dead last in the division; to make matters worse, the team was then docked a point by the league for rules infringement, leaving them seven points adrift of their closest rivals, the Bermuda Hogges. Nilson Perez was the team's top scorer in its debut season, with six goals.

In 2010, it was announced that the Monarchs would move from the USL Second Division to the USL Premier Development League (PDL).

In November 2012, the team announced that it was suspending operations for both the PDL team and the youth programs.

== Players ==
=== 2012 roster ===
Note: Flags indicate national team as defined under FIFA eligibility rules; some limited exceptions apply. Players may hold more than one non-FIFA nationality.

No.	Pos.	Nation	Player
1	GK	USA	Dustin Butcher
2	DF	USA	Matthew Griffin
3	MF	USA	Josh Danza
4	DF	USA	Adetomiwa Adewole
6	DF	ENG	Samuel Clare
7	MF	POR	Val Teixeira
8	MF	USA	George Fochive
9	FW	USA	Olakunle Banjo
10	MF	USA	Julio Arjona
11	FW	USA	David Neuberth
12	DF	IRL	Paul Andrews
13	MF	SLV	Caleb Iglesias
14	MF	USA	Jesse Sokolow

No.	Pos.	Nation	Player
15	FW	SOL	Dennis Runikera
17	DF	CMR	Uzi Tayou
18	FW	CMR	Franck Tayou
19	DF	USA	Travis Dennis
22	MF	USA	Alan Flott
23	MF	SEN	Aboubacarim Ndaw
24	DF	LBR	Bush Yormie
25	MF	USA	John Snyder
26	DF	USA	Nicholas Van Hollen
27	MF	USA	Ian Hendrie
28	DF	ARG	Emilio Cornago
29	FW	USA	Michael Brennan
30	DF	USA	Spencer Williams

=== Staff ===
- (United States) David Noyes - General Manager
- (Spain) Silvino Gonzalo - Head Coach
- (United States) David Edlow - Assistant Coach
- (Portugal) Val Teixeira - Assistant Coach
- (United States) Edward Brown - Assistant/Goalkeeper Coach
- (United States) Jordan Friedlander-Tapia - Assistant U-20s and U-17s

=== Notable former players ===
This list of notable former players comprises players who went on to play professional soccer after playing for the team in the Premier Development League, or those who previously played professionally before joining the team.

- (El Salvador) Dennis Alas
- (United States) David Bulow
- (El Salvador) Ronald Cerritos
- (Russia) Rod Dyachenko
- (Wales) Gareth Evans
- (United States) Brian Levey
- (Cuba) Rey Ángel Martínez
- (Scotland) Nicki Paterson
- (United States) Sean Rush
- (United States) Israel Sesay
- (Canada) Mason Trafford

== Year-by-year ==
Year	Division	League	Regular season	Playoffs	Open Cup
2008	3	USL Second Division	10th	did not qualify	2nd Round
2009	3	USL Second Division	5th	Quarter Finals	2nd Round
2010	3	USL Second Division	6th	did not qualify	2nd Round
2011	4	USL PDL	3rd, South Atlantic	did not qualify	did not qualify
2012	4	USL PDL	2nd, South Atlantic	Quarter Finals	did not qualify

== Head coaches ==
- (Spain) Silvino Gonzalo (2008, 2011–2012)
- (Brazil) Antonio Carlos Vieira (2008)
- (England) Anthony Hudson (2009–2010)

== Stadium ==
- Maryland SoccerPlex; Germantown, Maryland (2008)
- Roy Lester Stadium at Richard Montgomery High School; Rockville, Maryland (2009–2012)

== Average attendance ==
Attendance stats are calculated by averaging each team's self-reported home attendances from the historical match archive at here

- 2009: 608
- 2010: 798
- 2011: 923
- 2012: 1,051
