= FC Tulsa (NPSL) =

- Full name: FC Tulsa
- Founded: 2009
- Dissolved: 2010
- Ground: Memorial High School; Tulsa, Oklahoma
- Capacity: 7,500
- Owner: (United States) David Mortazavi
- Head Coach: (Colombia) Pilo Godoy
- League: National Premier Soccer League
- 2010: 2nd, Southeast; Playoffs: DNQ
Home colors	Away colors

FC Tulsa was an American soccer team based in Tulsa, Oklahoma, United States. Founded in 2009, the team played in the National Premier Soccer League (NPSL), a national amateur league at the fourth tier of the American Soccer Pyramid, in the Southeast Division.

The team played its home games in the stadium at Tulsa Memorial High School. The team's colors were pale blue and white.

The team folded after the 2010 season.

== Players ==
=== 2010 Roster ===
Note: Flags indicate national team as defined under FIFA eligibility rules; some limited exceptions apply. Players may hold more than one non-FIFA nationality.

No.	Pos.	Nation	Player
1	GK	USA	Irving Peralta
3	DF	USA	Sheldon Barrett
4	DF	USA	Brandon Waller
5	DF	USA	Jacob Rutledge
6	DF	USA	Armando Cruz
7	MF	USA	Carlos Pinto
8	MF	USA	Ismael Gaona
9	MF	USA	Emerson Aguilera
10	FW	USA	Abed Elkour
11	FW	USA	Ernesto Marquez
12	MF	USA	Tomas Rodriguez
14	MF	USA	George Esparza

No.	Pos.	Nation	Player
17	MF	USA	Angel Frausto
19	MF	USA	Marvin Escalante
21	MF	USA	Gary Duran
23	FW	USA	Miguel Peralta
24	DF	USA	Brian Beckford
25	DF	USA	Promise Heme
26	MF	USA	Ivo Abangma
20	FW	USA	Jorge Ernesto Lopez
—	GK	USA	Rafael Gonzalez
—	FW	USA	Daniel Peralta
—	MF	USA	Juan Peralta
—	GK	USA	Hector Zapata

== Year-by-year ==
Year	Division	League	Regular season	Playoffs	Open Cup
2010	4	NPSL	2nd, Southeast	Did not qualify	Did not qualify
2011	4	NPSL	On hiatus		Did not qualify

== Head coaches ==
- (Colombia) Pilo Godoy (2010–present)

== Stadia ==
- Stadium at Memorial High School; Tulsa, Oklahoma (2010–present)
