= 2009 U.S. Open Cup qualification =

American soccer cup qualification competition

This page details the qualification process for the 2009 U.S. Open Cup.

The tournament proper features teams from the top five levels of the American Soccer Pyramid. These five levels, namely Major League Soccer, the United Soccer Leagues (First Division, Second Division, and Premier Development League), and the United States Adult Soccer Association, each have their own separate qualification process to trim their ranks down to their final eight team delegations in the months leading up to the start of the tournament proper. It is expected that eight teams from each level will compete in the tournament proper, with the eight clubs from MLS receiving byes into the Third Round.

The qualifying process for MLS will take the form of an eight-team play-off tournament. The top six finishers, regardless of conference, in 2008 were given six of the berths into the Third Round. The eight remaining U.S.-based clubs will compete for the final two berths via a playoff.

Continuing the format of recent seasons, no qualification process will be needed for USL-1 and USL-2 as each level has exactly eight U.S.-based clubs for the 2009 season. The PDL has announced that selected early season games will again double as qualifying matches, as they had in recent years. Each conference will be given two berths that will be awarded to the best team in each division.

The qualifying process for the USASA will take the form of four regional tournaments. Assuming the continuation of recent seasons' format, the two finalists in each region will be awarded berths.

== Tier 1: Major League Soccer (MLS) ==
=== Bracket ===
Qualification Semifinals
New York Red Bulls	2
San Jose Earthquakes	1
FC Dallas	0
D.C. United	2
Colorado Rapids (AET/PK)	0 (4)
Los Angeles Galaxy	0 (2)
Real Salt Lake	1
Seattle Sounders FC	4

Qualification Finals
New York Red Bulls	3
D.C. United	5
Colorado Rapids	0
Seattle Sounders FC	1

Qualified
D.C. United
Seattle Sounders FC

=== Schedule ===
Note: Scorelines use the standard U.S. convention of placing the home team on the right-hand side of box scores.

==== Qualification Semifinals ====
April 7, 2009	Colorado Rapids	0 – 0 (aet) (4 – 2 p)	Los Angeles Galaxy	Carson, California
20:00 PDT	Dalby (red card) 36'	Report	Gonzales (yellow card) 41'; Marshall (yellow card) 63'; Magee (yellow card) 109'	Stadium: The Home Depot Center; Attendance: 6,219; Referee: Abiodun Okulaja
	Penalties
	Cummings (penalty scored); Ballouchy (penalty scored); Clark (penalty scored); Ihemelu (penalty scored)		(penalty scored) Gordon; (penalty missed) Klein; (penalty scored) Jordan; (penalty missed) Magee

April 22, 2009	FC Dallas	0 - 2	D.C. United	Washington, D.C.
19:30 EDT		Report	Fred 21'; Barklage 66'	Stadium: Robert F. Kennedy Memorial Stadium; Attendance: 5,163; Referee: Jeff Gontarek

April 28, 2009	Real Salt Lake	1 - 4	Seattle Sounders FC	Tukwila, Washington
19:00 PDT	Johnson 32'; Olave (yellow card) 41'	Report	Ianni (yellow card) 20'; Le Toux 25' (PK) 54'; Nyassi 27'; King 52'; Nyassi (yellow card) 71'	Stadium: Starfire Sports Complex; Attendance: 3,890

April 29, 2009	New York Red Bulls	2 - 1	San Jose Earthquakes	Santa Clara, California
19:30 PDT	Petke 2'; Sassano (yellow card) 76'; Wolyniec 80'; Pietravallo (yellow card) 82'	Report	Salinas (yellow card) 39'; Campos (yellow card) 47' (goal) 71'; Denton (yellow card) 67'	Stadium: Buck Shaw Stadium; Attendance: 4,011; Referee: Alejandro Mariscal

==== Qualification Finals ====
May 20, 2009
7:00 PM EDT

New York Red Bulls	3 - 5	D.C. United
Richards 44'; Rojas 48', 61' (pen.)	Report	Pontius 8', 52'; Khumalo 18'; Barklage 21'; Fred 28'

Robert F. Kennedy Memorial Stadium
Washington, D.C.
Attendance: 5,056
Referee: Mark Kadlecik

D.C. United qualify for the Third round.

May 26, 2009
7:00 PM PDT

Colorado Rapids	0 - 1	Seattle Sounders FC
Harvey (yellow card) 71'	Report	Forrest 62'

Starfire Sports Complex
Tukwila, Washington
Attendance: 4,007

Seattle Sounders F.C. qualify for the Third round.

== Tier 2: USL-1 and Tier 3: USL-2 ==
No qualification is necessary for USL-1 and USL-2 since each level has eight U.S.-based clubs for the 2009 season.

== Tier 4: USL Premier Development League (PDL) ==
Winners in each division advance to tournament
All teams play 4 designated games doubled as regular season games
Green indicates U.S. Open Cup berth clinched

=== Central Conference ===
==== Great Lakes Division ====
Team	GP	W	L	T	Pts	GD*
Chicago Fire Premier	4	3	0	1	10	+5
Kalamazoo Outrage	4	2	0	2	8	+2
Michigan Bucks	4	2	1	1	7	+3
Indiana Invaders	4	1	2	1	4	-1
Fort Wayne Fever	4	1	2	1	4	-2
Cleveland Internationals	4	1	3	0	3	-2
Cincinnati Kings	4	1	3	0	3	-7

==== Heartland Division ====
Team	GP	W	L	T	Pts	GD*
St. Louis Lions	4	3	0	1	10	+6
Des Moines Menace	4	3	0	1	10	+4
Real Colorado Foxes	4	2	2	0	6	+2
Rochester Thunder	4	2	2	0	6	+1
Kansas City Brass	4	1	3	0	3	-4
Springfield Demize	4	0	4	0	0	-9

=== Eastern Conference ===
==== Mid Atlantic Division ====
Team	GP	W	L	T	Pts	GD*
Reading Rage	4	3	0	1	10	+7
Carolina Dynamo	4	2	1	1	7	+2
Fredericksburg Gunners	4	2	1	1	7	+1
West Virginia Chaos	4	1	1	2	5	-2
Cary Clarets	4	1	2	1	4	-3
Virginia Legacy	3	0	0	3	3	0
Northern Virginia Royals	4	0	2	2	2	-2
Hampton Roads Piranhas	3	0	2	1	1	-3

==== Northeast Division ====
Team	GP	W	L	T	Pts	GD*
Ocean City Barons	4	3	0	1	10	+6
Long Island Rough Riders	4	3	1	0	9	+3
Brooklyn Knights	4	2	0	2	8	+2
Newark Ironbound Express	4	2	2	0	6	+3
Westchester Flames	4	1	1	2	5	-1
Rhode Island Stingrays	4	1	2	1	4	-3
New Hampshire Phantoms	4	0	3	1	1	-3
New Jersey Rangers	4	0	3	1	1	-7

=== Southern Conference ===
==== Mid South Division ====
Team	GP	W	L	T	Pts	GD*
El Paso Patriots	4	3	1	0	9	+3
Austin Aztex U23	4	2	1	1	7	+3
Laredo Heat	4	2	1	1	7	+2
Rio Grande Valley Bravos	4	1	1	2	5	0
West Texas United Sockers	4	1	1	2	5	-1
DFW Tornados	4	1	2	1	4	-2
Houston Leones	4	0	3	1	1	-5

==== Southeast Division ====
Team	GP	W	L	T	Pts	GD*
Mississippi Brilla	4	3	0	1	10	+3
Bradenton Academics	4	2	0	2	8	+5
New Orleans Jesters	4	1	0	3	6	+1
Baton Rouge Capitals	4	1	1	2	5	0
Atlanta Blackhawks	4	1	2	1	4	0
Nashville Metros	4	1	2	1	4	-2
Panama City Pirates	4	1	2	1	4	-4
Central Florida Kraze	4	0	3	1	1	-3

=== Western Conference ===
==== Northwest Division ====
Team	GP	W	L	T	Pts	GD*
Kitsap Pumas	4	3	0	1	10	+8
Portland Timbers U23's	4	3	1	0	9	+5
Seattle Wolves	4	2	1	1	7	+3
Cascade Surge	4	2	2	0	6	+1
Tacoma Tide	4	1	1	2	5	0
Spokane Spiders	4	1	3	0	3	-7
Yakima Reds	4	0	4	0	0	-10

==== Southwest Division ====
Team	GP	W	L	T	Pts	GD*
Orange County Blue Star	4	3	0	1	10	+5
Hollywood United Hitmen	4	3	1	0	9	+4
Ventura County Fusion	4	2	0	2	8	+4
BYU Cougars	4	2	1	1	7	0
Southern California Seahorses	4	1	0	3	6	+3
Los Angeles Legends	4	2	2	0	6	0
Fresno Fuego	4	1	2	1	4	0
Lancaster Rattlers	4	1	3	0	3	-4
Ogden Outlaws	4	0	3	1	1	-6
Bakersfield Brigade	4	0	3	1	1	-6

*-maximum goal differential of +/- 3 per game

== Tier 5: United States Adult Soccer Association (USASA) ==
=== Region I ===
Nine teams will compete for the two Region I berths in the U.S. Open Cup.

==== Bracket ====
Preliminary Round
NJ	GO Soccer FC	0
NPSL	Charm City FC	5

Qualification Semifinals
NY	New York Pancyprian-Freedoms	2
MA	Emigrantes Das Ilhas	4
CLS	U.S. PARMA	1
CT	Danbury United	6
VA	Aegean Hawks	2
PA	Vereinigung Erzgebirge	0
MD	Christos FC	1
NPSL	Charm City FC	4

Qualification Finals
MA	Emigrantes Das Ilhas	4 (AET)
CT	Danbury United	2
VA	Aegean Hawks	1
NPSL	Charm City FC	0

Qualified
MA	Emigrantes Das Ilhas
VA	Aegean Hawks

==== Preliminary Round ====
April 19, 2009
14:30 EDT

GO Soccer FC	0-5	Charm City FC

Calvert Hall College High School, Baltimore

==== Qualification Semifinals ====
May 3, 2009
14:00 EDT

New York Pancyprian-Freedoms	2-4	Emigrantes Das Ilhas

Massasoit Community College Field, Brockton

May 3, 2009
14:00 EDT

U.S. PARMA	1-6	Danbury United

Portuguese Cultural Center, Danbury

May 3, 2009
14:00 EDT

Aegean Hawks	2-0	Vereinigung Erzgebirge

VE Main Field, Warminster Township

May 3, 2009
14:00 EDT

Christos F.C.	1-4	Charm City FC

Cedar Lane Park, Harford County

==== Qualification Finals ====
May 24, 2009
14:00 EDT

Danbury United	2-4 (AET)	Emigrantes Das Ilhas

Portuguese Cultural Center, Danbury

May 24, 2009
15:30 EDT

Aegean Hawks	1-0	Charm City FC

Denison Nursery Field, Waldorf

=== Region II ===
Seven teams have qualified from Illinois, Michigan, Wisconsin, Nebraska, Indiana and Iowa.

Qualification Semifinals
MN	Minnesota Hawks	1
NE	402 FC	10
IL	RWB Adria
Bye
MI	Ann Arbor FC Elite	0
WI	Bavarian SC	1
NPSL	FC Indiana	2
IA	Des Moines Menace Reserves	4

Qualification Finals
NE	402 FC	5 (aet)
IL	RWB Adria	3
WI	Bavarian SC	3
IA	Des Moines	2

Qualified
NE	402 FC
WI	Bavarian SC

=== Region III ===
The following teams have qualified for the regional finals to be held in St. Johns, Florida from May 22 to 25, 2009.

Group A

- Lynch's Irish Pub F.C. (Florida)
- Pumas FC (NPSL - Alabama)
- Baton Rouge Classics (Louisiana)
- Greenwood Wanderers (South Carolina)

Group B

- Dynamo New Tampa (Florida)
- Legends F.C. (North Texas)
- Rocket City United (NPSL - Alabama)
- Atlanta FC (NPSL - Georgia)

Group A

Team	P	W	L	T	GF	GA	GD	Points
Lynch's Irish Pub F.C.	3	2	0	1	11	2	+9	7
Pumas FC (NPSL)	3	2	0	1	10	2	+8	7
Baton Rouge Classics	3	1	2	0	3	11	-8	3
Greenwood Wanderers	3	0	3	0	0	9	-9	0

May 22, 2009

Lynch's Irish Pub F.C.	2–2	Pumas FC

Fruit Cove Middle School, St. Johns, Florida
May 22, 2009

Baton Rouge Classics	3–0*	Greenwood Wanderers

Fruit Cove Middle School, St. Johns, Florida
May 23, 2009

Pumas FC	5–0	Baton Rouge Classics

Fruit Cove Middle School, St. Johns, Florida
May 23, 2009

Lynch's Irish Pub F.C.	3–0*	Greenwood Wanderers

Fruit Cove Middle School, St. Johns, Florida
May 24, 2009

Lynch's Irish Pub F.C.	6–0	Baton Rouge Classics

Fruit Cove Middle School, St. Johns, Florida
May 24, 2009

Pumas FC	3–0*	Greenwood Wanderers

Fruit Cove Middle School, St. Johns, Florida

*Greenwood Wanderers failed to show, so all games were 3–0 forfeits

Group B

Team	P	W	L	T	GF	GA	GD	Points
Atlanta FC (NPSL)	3	3	0	0	6	1	+5	9
Legends F.C.	3	2	1	0	4	1	+3	6
Rocket City United (NPSL)	3	1	2	0	4	3	+1	3
Dynamo New Tampa	3	0	3	0	0	9	-9	0

May 22, 2009

Dynamo New Tampa	0–3*	Rocket City United

Fruit Cove Middle School, St. Johns, Florida
May 22, 2009

Legends F.C.	0–1	Atlanta FC

Fruit Cove Middle School, St. Johns, Florida
May 23, 2009

Rocket City United	0–1	Legends F.C.

Fruit Cove Middle School, St. Johns, Florida
May 23, 2009

Dynamo New Tampa	0–3*	Atlanta FC

Fruit Cove Middle School, St. Johns, Florida
May 24, 2009

Dynamo New Tampa	0–3*	Legends F.C.

Fruit Cove Middle School, St. Johns, Florida
May 24, 2009

Rocket City United	1–2	Atlanta FC

Fruit Cove Middle School, St. Johns, Florida

*Dynamo New Tampa failed to show, so all games were 3–0 forfeits

Final

Final
1	Lynch's Irish Pub F.C.	3
2	Atlanta FC	4

May 25, 2009

Lynch's Irish Pub F.C.	3 - 4	Atlanta FC

Fruit Cove Middle School, St. Johns, Florida

=== Region IV ===
The following teams participated in the regional finals to be held in Scottsdale, Arizona from May 15 to 17, 2009.

Group A

- Doxa-Italia (Southern California)
- F.C. Hasental (Southern California)
- San Diego United (on hiatus from NPSL)
- Sonoma County Sol (on hiatus from NPSL)

Group B

- All Sol F.C. (New Mexico)
- Arizona Sahuaros (on hiatus from NPSL)
- Miran F.C. (Southern California)
- Rockstar United (Arizona)

Group A

Team	P	W	L	T	GF	GA	GD	Points
Sonoma County Sol	3	2	0	1	7	2	+5	7
Doxa-Italia	3	2	0	1	8	5	+3	7
San Diego United	3	1	2	0	5	7	-2	3
F.C. Hasental	3	0	3	0	3	9	-5	0

May 15, 2009

F.C. Hasental	0 – 3	San Diego United

Reach 11 Sports Complex, Phoenix
May 15, 2009

Sonoma County Sol	1 – 1	Doxa-Italia

Reach 11 Sports Complex, Phoenix
May 16, 2009

Doxa-Italia	4 – 2	F.C. Hasental

Reach 11 Sports Complex, Phoenix
May 16, 2009

San Diego United	0 – 4	Sonoma County Sol

Reach 11 Sports Complex, Phoenix
May 16, 2009

San Diego United	2 – 3	Doxa-Italia

Reach 11 Sports Complex, Phoenix
May 16, 2009

F.C. Hasental	1 – 2	Sonoma County Sol

Reach 11 Sports Complex, Phoenix

Group B

Team	P	W	L	T	GF	GA	GD	Points
Miran F.C.*	3	2	0	1	4	0	+4	7
Arizona Sahuaros	3	1	0	2	5	1	+4	5
All Sol F.C.	3	1	1	1	4	4	0	4
Rockstar United	3	0	3	0	2	10	-8	0

May 15, 2009

Rockstar United	0 – 3	Miran F.C.

Reach 11 Sports Complex, Phoenix
May 15, 2009

Arizona Sahuaros	1 – 1	All Sol F.C.

Reach 11 Sports Complex, Phoenix
May 16, 2009

Arizona Sahuaros	4 – 0	Rockstar United

Reach 11 Sports Complex, Phoenix
May 16, 2009

Miran F.C.	1 – 0	All Sol F.C.

Reach 11 Sports Complex, Phoenix
May 16, 2009

All Sol F.C.	3 – 2	Rockstar United

Reach 11 Sports Complex, Phoenix
May 16, 2009

Miran F.C.	0 – 0	Arizona Sahuaros

Reach 11 Sports Complex, Phoenix

Final

Final
1	Sonoma County Sol	2
2	Miran F.C.	1

May 18, 2009

Sonoma County Sol	2 – 1	Miran F.C.

Reach 11 Sports Complex, Phoenix

*Miran F.C. was disqualified for using illegitimate players, so the group runner up (Arizona Sahuaros) will participate in the U.S. Open Cup
