= 2007 U.S. Open Cup qualification =

American soccer cup qualification competition

This page describes the qualification procedure for the 2007 U.S. Open Cup.

== Major League Soccer ==
2 teams advance (1 from each bracket) to tournament
Top team hosts match

Semifinal (April 24, 7:30 PM EDT)		Final (May 8, 10:30 PM EDT)
		Los Angeles Galaxy (AET)	3
Columbus Crew	0	New York Red Bulls	1
Los Angeles Galaxy	1

Semifinal (April 18, 7:00 PM EDT)		Final (May 23, 9:30 PM EDT)
		Colorado Rapids	2
Real Salt Lake (AET)	2	Real Salt Lake	1
Kansas City Wizards	1

== USL 1st Division ==
All 9 US-based USL First Division teams will be entered into the Cup. The Puerto Rico Islanders are not eligible for the tournament, as Puerto Rico has a soccer federation independent from US Soccer.

== USL 2nd Division ==
Top 6 teams in table will advance to tournament
All regular season games through May 28 count
Green indicates U.S. Open Cup berth clinched

Club	GP	W	L	T	Pts	Pts/G	GD	Total games
Cleveland City Stars	5	4	0	1	13	2.6	+7	5
Charlotte Eagles	7	5	2	0	15	2.14	+7	7
Harrisburg City Islanders	7	3	1	3	12	1.71	+1	7
Western Mass Pioneers	6	2	2	2	8	1.33	0	6
Cincinnati Kings	7	2	3	2	8	1.14	+1	7
Crystal Palace Baltimore	6	1	4	1	4	0.67	-6	6
Wilmington Hammerheads	7	0	4	3	3	0.43	-7	7
New Hampshire Phantoms	6	0	4	2	2	0.33	-10	6

== USL Premier Development League ==
Winners in each division advance to tournament
All teams play 4 designated games doubled as regular season games
Green indicates U.S. Open Cup berth clinched

=== Central Conference ===
==== Great Lakes Division ====
Club	GP	W	L	T	Pts	GD*
Michigan Bucks	4	3	0	1	10	+7
Indiana Invaders	4	2	0	2	8	+3
Chicago Fire Premier	4	2	1	1	7	0
Fort Wayne Fever	4	2	2	0	6	-1
West Michigan Edge	4	1	3	0	3	-2
Cleveland Internationals	4	0	4	0	0	-8

==== Heartland Division ====
Club	GP	W	L	T	Pts	GD*
Kansas City Brass	4	4	0	0	12	+6
St. Louis Lions	4	2	2	0	6	0
Springfield Demize	4	2	2	0	6	0
Colorado Rapids U23's	4	2	2	0	6	-2
Des Moines Menace	4	1	3	0	3	-1
Sioux Falls Spitfire	4	1	3	0	3	-3

=== Eastern Conference ===
==== Mid Atlantic Division ====
Club	GP	W	L	T	Pts	GD*
Ocean City Barons	4	4	0	0	12	+7
Hampton Roads Piranhas	4	3	0	1	10	+8
Richmond Kickers Future	4	2	1	1	7	+2
Fredericksburg Gunners	4	2	1	1	7	+2
Virginia Legacy	4	2	2	0	6	-1
Reading Rage	4	1	1	2	5	-2
Northern Virginia Royals	4	1	2	1	4	-5
Delaware Dynasty	4	0	4	0	0	-4
West Virginia Chaos	4	0	4	0	0	-7

==== Northeast Division ====
Club	GP	W	L	T	Pts	GD*
Long Island Rough Riders	4	4	0	0	12	+5
Cape Cod Crusaders	4	2	0	2	8	+6
Brooklyn Knights	4	2	1	1	7	+2
Albany Admirals	4	2	2	0	6	-2
Rhode Island Stingrays	4	1	3	0	3	-2
Westchester Flames	4	0	2	2	2	-2
Vermont Voltage	4	0	3	1	1	-7

=== Southern Conference ===
==== Mid South Division ====
Club	GP	W	L	T	Pts	GD*
El Paso Patriots	4	3	0	1	10	+4
DFW Tornados	4	2	1	1	7	+2
Laredo Heat	4	1	1	2	5	+2
New Orleans Shell Shockers	4	1	1	2	5	+1
Austin Lightning	4	1	2	1	4	0
Mississippi Brilla	4	1	2	1	4	-2
Baton Rouge Capitals	4	1	3	0	3	-7

==== Southeast Division ====
Club	GP	W	L	T	Pts	GD*
Central Florida Kraze	4	3	1	0	9	+4
Atlanta Silverbacks U23's	4	2	0	2	8	+3
Carolina Dynamo	4	2	1	1	7	+4
Bradenton Academics	4	2	2	0	6	+2
Cary RailHawks U23's	4	1	1	2	5	0
Nashville Metros	4	1	1	2	5	-1
Palm Beach Pumas	4	1	3	0	3	-3
Cocoa Expos	4	0	3	1	1	-9

=== Western Conference ===
==== Northwest Division ====
Club	GP	W	L	T	Pts	GD*
BYU Cougars	4	3	1	0	9	+2
Tacoma Tide	4	2	1	1	7	+2
Yakima Reds	4	2	1	1	7	+1
Spokane Spiders	4	2	2	0	6	-2
Ogden Outlaws	4	1	3	0	3	-1
Cascade Surge	4	1	3	0	3	-2

==== Southwest Division ====
Club	GP	W	L	T	Pts	GD*
Bakersfield Brigade	4	3	1	0	9	+6
Ventura County Fusion	4	3	1	0	9	+3
San Jose Frogs	4	3	1	0	9	+2
San Fernando Valley Quakes	4	2	1	1	7	+2
Fresno Fuego	4	2	2	0	6	0
Los Angeles Storm	4	2	2	0	6	-1
San Francisco Seals	4	2	2	0	6	-2
Southern California Seahorses	4	1	3	0	3	-2
Lancaster Rattlers	4	1	3	0	3	-5
Orange County Blue Star	4	0	3	1	1	-3

*-maximum goal differential of +/- 3 per game

== USASA ==
=== Region 1 ===
Teams that reach final advance to tournament

First round April 29	Quarterfinals; May 6
MD	A.C. United	7
E PA 2	Ukrainian Nationals	1
MD	A.C. United	4
E PA 1	Vereinigung Erzebirge	1
Group A
DC/VA	Aegean Hawks (AET, PSO)	1 (4)
E NY	Greek American Atlas	1 (2)
NH	NH Phantoms Future	0
NPSL NE	Queen City FC	5
NPSL NE	Queen City FC	0
RI	Emigrantes Das Ilhas	1
Group B
CT	Danbury United	5
MA	Lowell Revolution	0

Semifinals; May 20
MD	A.C. United	0
DC/VA	Aegean Hawks	4
RI	Emigrantes Das Ilhas	1 (5)
CT	Danbury United (AET/PSO)	1 (6)

Region Final; June 24
DC/VA	Aegean Hawks
CT	Danbury United

=== Region 2 ===
Teams that reach final advance to tournament.

Quarterfinals; April 21
MO	St. Louis Kutis S.C.	L
MI 2	AAFC Elite (forfeit)	W
IN	Lafayette Veracruz	1
WI	Milwaukee Bavarians	4
IL	RWB Adria	1
IA	Des Moines Menace Reserves	0
NPSL MW	Princeton 56ers	1
MI 1	Detroit United	2

Semifinals; May 12
MI 2	AAFC Elite	0
WI	Milwaukee Bavarians	6
IL	RWB Adria	3
MI 1	Detroit United	0

Finals; June 17
WI	Milwaukee Bavarians	1
IL	RWB Adria	2

=== Region 3 ===
Winners of groups advance to tournament
All matches at Jordan Soccer Complex in Fayetteville, North Carolina
Green indicates U.S. Open Cup berth clinched

==== Group A ====
Club	GP	W	L	T	Pts	GD
Lynch's Irish Pub	2	2	0	0	6	+6
Dallas Roma F.C.	2	1	1	0	3	-1
Saturn FC	2	0	2	0	0	-5

==== Group B ====
Club	GP	W	L	T	Pts	GD
Azzurri FC	2	2	0	0	6	+8
Death Penguins	2	1	1	0	3	0
Lake Charles Sting	2	0	2	0	0	-8

==== Matches ====
May 25

Saturn FC	1–3	Lynch's Irish Pub

Group A
May 25

Death Penguins	1–4	Azzurri FC

Group B

May 26

Dallas Roma F.C.	4–1	Saturn FC

Group A
May 26

Lake Charles Sting	1–6	Azzurri FC

Group B

May 27

Lynch's Irish Pub	4–0	Dallas Roma F.C.

Group A
May 27

Lake Charles Sting	1–4	Death Penguins

Group B

=== Region 4 ===
Teams that reach final advance to tournament
All times in Pacific Daylight Time

==== First round ====
Winners of groups plus best second-place finisher advance to Semifinal
Green indicates advancement to Semifinal

Group A

Club	GP	W	L	T	Pts	GD
Indios USA	3	2	0	1	7	+4
San Diego Pumitas	3	0	2	1	1	-12
SudaCA FC	3	0	3	0	0	-17

Group B

Club	GP	W	L	T	Pts	GD
Banat Arsenal	3	2	1	0	6	+10
Sonoma County Sol	3	2	1	0	6	+9
Albuquerque Asylum	3	1	0	2	5	+6

Group C

Club	GP	W	L	T	Pts	GD
Arizona Sahuaros	3	2	0	1	7	+2
Hollywood United	3	2	1	0	6	+5
Southern Cal. Fusion	3	1	1	1	4	-2
Salinas Valley Samba	3	0	3	0	0	-5

==== First round matches ====
May 17
9:00 AM

Indios USA	3–0	Sonoma County Sol

Field 1
May 17
9:00 AM

San Diego Pumitas	1–1	Albuquerque Asylum

Field 2
May 17
9:00 AM

SudaCA FC	0–5	Banat Arsenal

Field 3
May 17
11:00 AM

Hollywood United	1–2	Arizona Sahuaros

Field 1
May 17
11:00 AM

Southern California Fusion	2–1	Salinas Valley Samba

Field 2

May 17
3:00 PM

Albuquerque Asylum	2–2	Indios USA

Field 3
May 17
3:00 PM

Banat Arsenal	6–0	San Diego Pumitas

Field 1
May 17
3:00 PM

Sonoma County Sol	6–0	SudaCA FC

Field 2
May 17
5:00 PM

Salinas Valley Samba	3–6	Hollywood United

Field 3
May 17
5:00 PM

Arizona Sahuaros	1–1	Southern California Fusion

Field 4

May 18
10:00 AM

Banat Arsenal	0–1	Indios USA

Field 2
May 18
10:00 AM

San Diego Pumitas	0–6	Sonoma County Sol

Field 4
May 18
10:00 AM

SudaCA FC	0–6	Albuquerque Asylum

Field 1
May 18
12:00 PM

Southern California Fusion	0–3*	Hollywood United

Field 1
May 18
12:00 PM

Arizona Sahuaros	1–0	Salinas Valley Samba

Field 2

* - Southern California Fusion were forced to forfeit the match (originally a 3–2 win) due to use of an illegal player

==== Tournament ====
Semifinals; May 19, 1:00 PM
A1	Indios USA	3
C1	Arizona Sahuaros	1
B1	Banat Arsenal	4
B2	Sonoma County Sol	2

Final; May 20, 10:00 AM
A1	Indios USA	2
B1	Banat Arsenal	3

== See also ==
- 2007 U.S. Open Cup
- United States Soccer Federation
- Lamar Hunt U.S. Open Cup
- Major League Soccer
- United Soccer Leagues
- USASA
- National Premier Soccer League
