= 2010 U.S. Open Cup qualification =

American soccer cup qualification competition

The 2010 U.S. Open Cup tournament proper features teams from the top five levels of the American Soccer Pyramid. These five levels, namely Major League Soccer, the United Soccer Leagues (First Division, Second Division, and Premier Development League), and the United States Adult Soccer Association, each have their own separate qualification process to trim their ranks down to their final team delegations in the months leading up to the start of the tournament proper.

The 2010 Cup will feature 8 teams from the MLS, 9 from the USSF Division 2 (being all 9 US-based teams), all 6 teams from the USL Second Division, 8 teams from the PDL, 8 from USASA, and an additional team resulting from a single match between Sonoma County Sol of the National Premier Soccer League and PSA Los Gatos Storm of US Club Soccer. The eight clubs from MLS will receive byes into the Third Round.

== Tier 1: Major League Soccer (MLS) ==
The top six MLS clubs in the 2009 standings were given six of the berths into the Third Round while the nine remaining U.S.-based clubs will compete for the final two berths via a playoff.

=== Bracket ===
Play-in Round
9	Philadelphia Union	1
8	New York Red Bulls	2

Qualification Semifinals
1	New England Revolution	0
8	New York Red Bulls	3
3	Colorado Rapids	2
6	Kansas City Wizards	1
2	Real Salt Lake (p)	3
7	San Jose Earthquakes	3
5	FC Dallas	2
4	D.C. United	4

Qualification Finals
8	New York Red Bulls	3
3	Colorado Rapids	0
2	Real Salt Lake	1
4	D.C. United (aet)	2

Qualified
8	New York Red Bulls
4	D.C. United

=== Schedule ===
Note: Scorelines use the standard U.S. convention of placing the home team on the right-hand side of box scores.

==== Play-in Round ====
April 27, 2010	Philadelphia Union	1 – 2	New York Red Bulls	Harrison, New Jersey
20:00 EST	Jacobson (yellow card) 31'; Le Toux 68'; Miglioranzi (yellow card) 76'	(Report)	16' 41' Chinn; (yellow card) 66' Borman; (yellow card) 81' Boyens	Stadium: Red Bull Arena; Attendance: 3,015; Referee: Andrew Chapin

==== Qualification Semifinals ====
April 14, 2010	Real Salt Lake	3 – 3 (a.e.t.) (5 – 3 p)	San Jose Earthquakes	Santa Clara, California
19:00 PDT	Findley 7'; Johnson (yellow card) 8'; González 60'; Beckerman (yellow card) 89'; Borchers 117'	(Report)	(yellow card) 51' Beitashour; 68' Leitch; 88' Álvarez; 108' (yellow card) 109' Burling	Stadium: Buck Shaw Stadium; Attendance: 2,718; Referee: Alejandro Mariscal
	Penalties
	Johnson (penalty scored); Beckerman (penalty scored); Findley (penalty scored); Russell (penalty scored); Williams (penalty scored)		(penalty missed) Álvarez; (penalty scored) Gjertsen; (penalty scored) McDonald; (penalty scored) Sánchez

April 14, 2010	Colorado Rapids	2 – 1	Kansas City Wizards	Kansas City, Missouri
19:30 CDT	Thompson 24' (yellow card) 32' (goal) 80'	(Report)	4' Bunbury; (yellow card) 20' Chhetri; (yellow card) 60' Conrad	Stadium: Durwood Soccer Stadium; Attendance: 1,226; Referee: Tony Russo

April 28, 2010	FC Dallas	2 – 4	D.C. United	Washington, D.C.
19:30 EDT	Guarda 52'; McCarty 57' (pen.); Wallace (yellow card) 67'; Edward (yellow card) 72'	(Report)	4', 59' Cristman; (yellow card) 21' Morsink; (yellow card) 28' Wallace; 39' Castillo; 51' Najar	Stadium: Robert F. Kennedy Memorial Stadium; Attendance: 2,804; Referee: Chris Penso

May 12, 2010	New England Revolution	0 – 3	New York Red Bulls	Harrison, New Jersey
20:00 EDT	Phelan (yellow card) 88'	(Report)	36' 64' Wolyniec; 62' Ubiparipović	Stadium: Red Bull Arena; Attendance: 1,935; Referee: Shane Moody

==== Qualification Finals ====
May 26, 2010
20:00 EDT

Colorado Rapids	0 – 3	New York Red Bulls
Larentowicz (yellow card) 12'; Thompson (yellow card) 54'; Earls (red card) 86'	(Report)	11' 43' Wolyniec; 56' Chinn; (yellow card) 77' Stammler

Red Bull Arena
Harrison, New Jersey
Attendance: 2,637
Referee: Niko Bratsis

New York Red Bulls qualify for the Round of 16.

June 2, 2010
19:30 EST

Real Salt Lake	1 – 2 (aet)	D.C. United
Beltran (yellow card) 70'; Warner (yellow card) 73'; Alexandre (yellow card) 77'; Johnson 81' (pen.)	(Report)	75' (pen.) Emilio; (yellow card) 90+3' Morsink; 107' Najar; (red card) 120+2' James

Robert F. Kennedy Memorial Stadium
Washington, D.C.
Attendance: 3,074
Referee: Mark Kadlecik

D.C. United qualify for the Round of 16.

== Tier 2: USSF D-2 Pro League and Tier 3: USL-2 ==
Due to the reshuffling of teams and the compromise between the United Soccer Leagues and the breakaway North American Soccer League, there are only 6 teams in USL-2 and 9 eligible teams in the newly formed USSF Division 2 Professional League (Montreal Impact, Vancouver Whitecaps FC and Puerto Rico Islanders are not eligible because they are Canadian or Puerto Rican clubs). All 15 eligible teams will automatically qualify rather than 8 from each league as in years past, leaving an additional slot to be filled .

== Tier 4: Premier Development League ==
PDL eligible clubs (59 of 67) qualify by playing in PDL league matches in April and May that double as US Open Cup qualifying matches. The team with the best record in those games from each of the eight divisions will advance to the Cup.

The Abbotsford Mariners, Ottawa Fury, Toronto Lynx, Thunder Bay Chill, Vancouver Whitecaps Residency, Victoria Highlanders and Forest City London are not eligible because they are Canadian clubs. Also the Bermuda Hogges is not eligible because it is a Bermudian club.

Western Conference
Northwest Division	Kitsap Pumas
Southwest Division	Ventura County Fusion
Central Conference
Great Lakes Division	Dayton Dutch Lions
Heartland Division	Des Moines Menace
Southern Conference
Mid-South Division	DFW Tornados
Southeast Division	Central Florida Kraze
Eastern Conference
Mid-Atlantic Division	Reading United
Northeast Division	Long Island Rough Riders

Northwest Division
Team	W	D	L	Pts
Kitsap Pumas	4	0	0	12
Portland Timbers U23's	4	0	0	12
Tacoma Tide	2	0	2	6
Yakima Reds	1	0	3	3
Washington Crossfire	1	0	3	3
Spokane Spiders	0	0	4	0

Southwest Division
Team	W	D	L	Pts
Ventura County Fusion	3	0	1	9
Orange County Blue Star	2	2	0	8
Los Angeles Azul Legends	2	1	1	7
Fresno Fuego	1	2	1	5
Lancaster Rattlers	1	2	1	5
BYU Cougars	1	1	2	4
Hollywood United Hitmen	1	1	2	4
Ogden Outlaws	1	1	2	4
Southern California Seahorses	1	0	3	3

Great Lakes Division
Team	W	D	L	Pts
Dayton Dutch Lions	3	1	0	10
Michigan Bucks	3	0	1	9
Chicago Fire Premier	2	1	1	7
Indiana Invaders	1	1	1	4
Cleveland Internationals	1	1	2	4
Cincinnati Kings	1	0	3	3
Kalamazoo Outrage	0	0	3	0

Heartland Division
Team	W	D	L	Pts
Des Moines Menace	3	0	1	9
Rochester Thunder	2	1	1	7
Real Colorado Foxes	2	1	1	7
St. Louis Lions	2	0	2	6
Kansas City Brass	1	1	2	4
Springfield Demize	0	1	3	1

Mid-South Division
Team	W	D	L	Pts
DFW Tornados	3	0	1	9
Rio Grande Valley Bravos	2	1	1	7
Laredo Heat	2	0	2	6
El Paso Patriots	2	0	2	6
West Texas United Sockers	2	0	2	6
Houston Leones	0	1	3	1

Southeast Division
Team	W	D	L	Pts
Central Florida Kraze	3	1	0	10
Mississippi Brilla	3	1	0	10
Baton Rouge Capitals	2	2	0	8
New Orleans Jesters	2	0	2	6
Atlanta Blackhawks	1	2	1	5
Bradenton Academics	1	1	2	4
Nashville Metros	1	1	2	4
Fort Lauderdale Schulz Academy	0	0	3	0

Mid-Atlantic Division
Team	W	D	L	Pts
Reading United	4	0	0	12
Newark Ironbound Express	4	0	0	12
New Jersey Rangers	3	0	1	9
Carolina Dynamo	1	1	1	4
Central Jersey Spartans	1	1	2	4
West Virginia Chaos	1	0	3	3
Ocean City Nor'easters	0	2	2	2
Hampton Roads Piranhas	0	1	2	1
Northern Virginia Royals	0	1	3	1

Northeast Division
Team	W	D	L	Pts
Long Island Rough Riders	3	1	0	10
Albany BWP Highlanders	3	1	0	10
Western Mass Pioneers	2	1	1	7
Portland Phoenix	1	3	0	6
New Hampshire Phantoms	1	2	1	5
Vermont Voltage	1	0	3	3
Westchester Flames	0	2	2	2
Brooklyn Knights	0	0	4	0

== Tier 5: United States Adult Soccer Association (USASA) ==
USASA is divided into four geographical regions, each of which will advance two teams to the US Open Cup. Assuming the continuation of recent seasons' format, the two finalists in each region will be awarded berths.

=== Region I ===
Region I represents the northeastern region of the US. The regional tournament began April 10 and the remaining four teams will compete in the semifinals on May 23. The two regional finalists will advance to the 2010 US Open Cup. The quarterfinalists are:

Aegean Hawks	Virginia
Brooklyn Italians	New York
Charm City FC	Maryland
Danbury United	Connecticut
Fenerbahce USA	New York
Go Soccer FC	New Jersey
NY Pancyprian-Freedoms	New York
United German Hungarians	Pennsylvania

Quarterfinals
United German Hungarians	3
Charm City FC	1
NY Pancyprian-Freedoms	2
Aegean Hawks	1
Go Soccer FC	0
Brooklyn Italians	1
Fenerbahce USA	4
Danbury United	4

Semifinals
United German Hungarians	0 (0)
NY Pancyprian-Freedoms	0 (3)
Brooklyn Italians	4
Fenerbahce USA	0

Qualified
NY Pancyprian-Freedoms
Brooklyn Italians

=== Region II ===
Region II represents the midwestern region of the US. The regional tournament began May 1 and the semifinal matches were played May 15. Both finalists qualified for the 2010 US Open Cup. The quarterfinalists were:

402 FC	Nebraska
AAC Eagles	Illinois
Des Moines Menace	Iowa
Detroit United	Michigan
Fire SC '00	Minnesota
KC Athletics	Kansas
Milwaukee Kickers	Wisconsin
St. Paul Twin Stars (NPSL)	Minnesota

Quarterfinals
Fire SC '00	3
AAC Eagles	8
KC Athletics	4 (6)
Des Moines Menace	4 (5)
St. Paul Twin Stars	1
402 FC	2
Detroit United	2
Milwaukee Kickers	1

Semifinals
AAC Eagles	3 (3)
KC Athletics	3 (5)
402 FC	5 (2)
Detroit United	5 (4)

Qualified
KC Athletics
Detroit United

=== Region III ===
Region III represents the southeastern region of the US. The regional tournament was conducted from May 29 to May 30 at the University of Alabama. Though it was originally scheduled to feature nine clubs organized into three groups of three followed by an elimination bracket, a lightning storm canceled the first day of games and Brazil Soccer Academy was disqualified for failing to show. The tournament was reorganized into two groups of four with the winner of each group qualifying for the US Open Cup.

Group A
Team		W	D	L	Pts
Legends FC	Texas	3	0	0	9
Pumas FC (NPSL)	Alabama	1	0	1	3
Lynch's Irish Pub	Florida	0	1	1	1
Rocket City United (NPSL)	Alabama	0	1	2	1

Group B
Team		W	D	L	Pts
CASL Elite	North Carolina	2	1	0	7
FC Tulsa (NPSL)	Oklahoma	1	1	1	4
Atlanta FC (NPSL)	(Georgia (U.S. state)) Georgia	1	1	1	4
ASC New Stars	Texas	0	1	2	1

=== Region IV ===
Region IV represents the western region of the US. The regional tournament was conducted from May 21 to May 23 in Sacramento, CA. An initial eleven teams divided into three groups, each of which played round-robin, and the winner of each group as well as the best performing second place team advanced to a four team bracket. The two semifinal winners advanced to the regional final as well as the 2010 US Open Cup.

Flight A
Team		W	D	L	Pts
Real San Jose (NPSL)	California	2	0	0	6
FC Hasental	California	1	0	1	3
SF Italian Athletics	California	0	0	2	0

Flight B
Team		W	D	L	Pts
Bay Area Ambassadors (NPSL)	California	3	0	0	9
San Diego Boca FC (NPSL)	California	1	1	1	4
French Soccer Academy	Washington	1	1	1	4
Arizona Pros	Arizona	0	0	3	0

Flight C
Team		W	D	L	Pts
Sacramento Gold (NPSL)	California	3	0	0	9
Arizona Sahuaros (NPSL)	Arizona	1	1	1	4
Doxa Italia	California	1	1	1	4
Yakima United	Washington	0	0	3	0

Semifinals
1	Bay Area Ambassadors	1
4	Sacramento Gold (NPSL)	0
3	Real San Jose	1
2	Arizona Sahuaros	2

Qualified
Bay Area Ambassadors
Arizona Sahuaros

== 40th place ==
Due to the 2010 restructuring of the USSF Division 2, only 15 US-based teams were available to take the USL and NASL's non-amateur slots. On May 5, 2010 the USSF announced that the remaining slot would be allotted to the winner of a game between the Sonoma County Sol and PSA Los Gatos Storm, two California-based clubs in the US Soccer amateur structure.

May 22, 2010
7:00 PDT

Los Gatos Storm	0 – 3	Sonoma County Sol (NPSL)
	(Report)

PAL Stadium, San Jose
