= 2008 U.S. Open Cup qualification =

American soccer cup qualification competition

This page describes the qualification procedure for the 2008 U.S. Open Cup. This was the first season where 8 teams from each level of the American Soccer Pyramid competed in the tournament proper. As a result, each level trimmed its ranks to its 8 team delegation before entering the full tournament.

== Major League Soccer (MLS) ==
First Round (April 30)
Real Salt Lake	4
San Jose Earthquakes	0

Second Round (May 27)
Colorado Rapids	1
Los Angeles Galaxy	0
Columbus Crew	2
Real Salt Lake	0

Qualification Finals (June 4/10)
Kansas City Wizards (AET/PSO)	2 (5)
Colorado Rapids	2 (3)
Chicago Fire	3
Columbus Crew	2

Qualified
Kansas City Wizards
Chicago Fire

== United Soccer Leagues (USL) ==
=== USL 1st Division (USL-1) ===
All American-based USL-1 teams qualify.

=== USL 2nd Division (USL-2) ===
Harrisburg City Islanders (2007 USL-2 champions) and Richmond Kickers (2007 USL-2 Regular Season Champions) qualified based on their end of season performance in 2007.

Early season USL-2 games doubled as Open Cup qualification. Because teams played an uneven number of games the percentage of "Points per Points Possible" was used to rank the teams. All but the bottom-ranked team qualified for the tournament proper.

Green indicates Open Cup berth clinched

Team	GP	W	L	T	Pts.	Pts. %	GD
Crystal Palace Baltimore	5	5	0	0	15	100%	+9
Charlotte Eagles	6	4	1	1	13	72%	+10
Cleveland City Stars	6	3	1	2	11	61%	+7
Real Maryland Monarchs	6	3	3	0	9	50%	-2
Western Mass Pioneers	6	2	3	1	7	39%	-3
Pittsburgh Riverhounds	7	0	5	2	2	10%	-10
Wilmington Hammerheads	5	0	4	1	1	7%	-6

Standings as of May 26.

=== USL Premier Development League (PDL) ===
Each conference has its own qualification process.

All teams play 4 designated regular season games that double as Open Cup qualification
Green indicates Open Cup berth clinched

==== Central Conference ====
Top two teams qualify

Team	GP	W	L	T	Pts.	GD*
Michigan Bucks	4	4	0	0	12	+9
St. Louis Lions	4	3	0	1	10	+3
Chicago Fire Premier	4	3	1	0	9	+5
Cleveland Internationals	4	2	1	1	7	+5
Des Moines Menace	4	2	1	1	7	+3
Colorado Rapids U23's	4	2	1	1	7	+2
Kalamazoo Outrage	4	2	1	1	7	+1
Cincinnati Kings	4	2	2	0	6	-2
Kansas City Brass	4	1	2	1	4	0
Fort Wayne Fever	4	1	2	1	4	-4
West Michigan Edge	4	1	3	0	3	-5
West Virginia Chaos	4	0	2	2	2	-4
Indiana Invaders	4	0	3	1	1	-5
Springfield Demize	4	0	4	0	0	-8

*maximum goal differential of +/- 3 per game
Standings as of May 26.

==== Eastern Conference ====
Top two teams qualify

Team	GP	W	L	T	Pts.	GD*
Fredericksburg Gunners	4	4	0	0	12	+7
Brooklyn Knights	4	3	0	1	10	+5
Cape Cod Crusaders	4	3	1	0	9	+6
Reading Rage	4	3	1	0	9	+4
Ocean City Barons	4	2	0	2	8	+5
Newark Ironbound Express	4	2	0	2	8	+4
New Hampshire Phantoms	4	2	0	2	8	+2
Westchester Flames	4	2	1	1	7	+2
Long Island Rough Riders	4	1	1	2	5	+1
Vermont Voltage	4	1	3	0	3	-4
Northern Virginia Royals	4	1	3	0	3	-6
Virginia Legacy	4	0	2	2	2	-5
Richmond Kickers Future	4	0	3	1	1	-4
Hampton Roads Piranhas	4	0	3	1	1	-5
Rhode Island Stingrays	4	0	3	1	1	-5
New Jersey Rangers	4	0	3	1	1	-7

*maximum goal differential of +/- 3 per game
Standings as of May 26.

==== Southern Conference ====
Top team in each division qualifies

===== Mid South Division =====
Team	GP	W	L	T	Pts.	GD*
Austin Aztex U23	4	3	0	1	10	+6
Laredo Heat	4	2	1	1	7	+1
New Orleans Shell Shockers	4	2	1	1	7	-1
Houston Leones	4	2	2	0	6	+2
El Paso Patriots	4	1	1	2	5	0
Mississippi Brilla	4	1	2	1	4	-3
Baton Rouge Capitals	4	1	3	0	3	-1
DFW Tornados	4	1	3	0	3	-4

*maximum goal differential of +/- 3 per game
Standings as of May 26.

===== Southeast Division =====
Team	GP	W	L	T	Pts.	GD*
Bradenton Academics	4	3	0	1	10	+7
Carolina Dynamo	4	3	1	0	9	+4
Central Florida Kraze	4	3	1	0	9	+2
Atlanta Silverbacks U23's	4	2	1	1	7	+2
Nashville Metros	4	2	2	0	6	-1
Cary RailHawks U23's	4	1	2	1	4	-2
Panama City Pirates	4	0	3	1	1	-3
Palm Beach Pumas	4	0	4	0	0	-9

*maximum goal differential of +/- 3 per game
Standings as of May 26.

==== Western Conference ====
Top team in each division qualifies

===== Northwest Division =====
Team	GP	W	L	T	Pts.	GD*
Yakima Reds	4	3	0	1	10	+5
BYU Cougars	4	2	1	1	7	+3
Tacoma Tide	4	2	1	1	7	+3
Ogden Outlaws	4	1	2	1	4	-1
Spokane Spiders	4	1	3	0	3	-4
Cascade Surge	4	0	2	2	2	-6

*maximum goal differential of +/- 3 per game
Standings as of May 26.

===== Southwest Division =====
Team	GP	W	L	T	Pts.	GD*
Los Angeles Legends	4	3	0	1	10	+7
San Jose Frogs	4	3	0	1	10	+5
San Francisco Seals	4	2	0	2	8	+2
Fresno Fuego	4	2	1	1	7	+1
Bakersfield Brigade	4	1	0	3	6	+1
Orange County Blue Star	4	1	2	1	4	0
San Fernando Valley Quakes	4	1	2	1	4	-3
Southern California Seahorses	4	1	3	0	3	-3
Ventura County Fusion	4	0	2	2	2	-2
Lancaster Rattlers	4	0	4	0	0	-8

*maximum goal differential of +/- 3 per game
Standings as of May 26.

== United States Adult Soccer Association (USASA) ==
=== Region I ===
First Round (April 27)
Sport Club Portuguese	0
Aegean Hawks	1

Qualification Semifinals (May 4)
Queen City FC	0
Danbury United	2
SC Vistula Garfield (forfeit)	L
Boston Olympiakos	W
Baltimore Colts FC	2
Aegean Hawks	3
Pancyprian-Freedoms	3
United German-Hungarians	1

Qualification Finals (May 18)
Danbury United	0
Boston Olympiakos	1
Aegean Hawks	2
Pancyprian-Freedoms	3

Qualified (June 22)
Boston Olympiakos
Pancyprian-Freedoms

=== Region II ===
Qualification Semifinals (May 3)		Qualification Finals (May 17)		Qualified (June 27)
Carpathia Kickers	0 (5)
RWB Adria (AET, PSO)	0 (6)	RWB Adria	2
Bloomington Cutters (forfeit)	L	Princeton 56ers	0
Princeton 56ers	W			RWB Adria
Bavarian SC	2			AAC Eagles
AAC Eagles	3	AAC Eagles	2
WC Arsenal Soccer	0	Des Moines Menace Reserves	1
Des Moines Menace Reserves	2

=== Region III ===
Group winners qualify
All times in Eastern Daylight Time

==== Group stage ====
Green indicates Open Cup berth clinched

Group A

Team	GP	W	L	T	Pts.	GD
Clearwater Galactics	3	2	0	1	7	+6
Atlanta FC	3	2	1	0	6	+4
Dallas Roma F.C.	3	1	1	1	4	+2
LA Mudbugs	3	0	3	0	0	-12

Group B

Team	GP	W	L	T	Pts.	GD
ASC New Stars	3	2	0	1	7	+5
Mustang Legends FC	3	2	1	0	6	+1
Lynch's F.C.	3	1	2	0	3	+3
Greenwood Wanderers	3	0	2	1	1	-9

===== Group Stage Matches =====
May 23
1:00 PM

Dallas Roma F.C.	5 – 0	LA Mudbugs

Eagle Harbor Soccer Complex
May 23
1:00 PM

Atlanta FC	3 – 4	Clearwater Galactics

Eagle Harbor Soccer Complex
May 23
1:00 PM

Lynch's F.C.	1 – 2	Mustang Legends FC

Eagle Harbor Soccer Complex
May 23
1:00 PM

ASC New Stars	4 – 4	Greenwood Wanderers

Eagle Harbor Soccer Complex

May 24
10:30 AM

Dallas Roma F.C.	0 – 0	Clearwater Galactics

Eagle Harbor Soccer Complex
May 24
6:00 PM

Mustang Legends FC	0 – 3	ASC New Stars

Eagle Harbor Soccer Complex
May 24
6:00 PM

LA Mudbugs	1 – 3	Atlanta FC

Eagle Harbor Soccer Complex
May 24
6:00 PM

Greenwood Wanderers	1 – 7	Lynch's F.C.

Eagle Harbor Soccer Complex

May 25
4:00 PM

Dallas Roma F.C.	0 – 3	Atlanta FC

Eagle Harbor Soccer Complex
May 25
4:00 PM

LA Mudbugs	1 – 6	Clearwater Galactics

Eagle Harbor Soccer Complex
May 25
4:00 PM

Lynch's F.C.	1 – 3	ASC New Stars

Eagle Harbor Soccer Complex
May 25
4:00 PM

Mustang Legends FC	4 – 1	Greenwood Wanderers

Eagle Harbor Soccer Complex

===== Final match =====
May 26
11:30 AM

Clearwater Galactics	2 – 1	ASC New Stars

Eagle Harbor Soccer Complex

=== Region IV ===
Group winners qualify
All times in Eastern Daylight Time

==== Group stage ====
Green indicates Open Cup berth clinched

Group A

Team	GP	W	L	T	Pts.	GD
Arizona Sahuaros	3	2	0	1	7	+5
Sonoma County Sol	3	2	0	1	7	+4
Rockstar United	3	1	2	0	3	0
Salinas Valley Samba	3	0	3	0	0	-9

Group B

Team	GP	W	L	T	Pts.	GD
Hollywood United F.C.	3	3	0	0	9	+5
Santa Cruz County Breakers	3	1	1	1	4	+2
San Diego United	3	1	1	1	4	+1
Banat Arsenal	3	0	3	0	0	-8

===== Group Stage Matches =====
May 16
11:00 PM

Arizona Sahuaros	4–0	Salinas Valley Samba

Scottsdale Sports Complex Field 1
May 16
11:00 PM

Rockstar United	0–1	Sonoma County Sol

Scottsdale Sports Complex Field 2
May 16
11:00 PM

San Diego United	4–1	Banat Arsenal

Scottsdale Sports Complex Field 3
May 16
11:00 PM

Hollywood United F.C.	2–0	Santa Cruz County Breakers

Scottsdale Sports Complex Field 4

May 17
1:00 PM

Salinas Valley Samba	0–3	Sonoma County Sol

Scottsdale Sports Complex Field 3
May 17
1:00 PM

Banat Arsenal	1–5	Santa Cruz County Breakers

Scottsdale Sports Complex Field 1
May 17
1:00 PM

Rockstar United	1–2	Arizona Sahuaros

Scottsdale Sports Complex Field 4
May 17
1:00 PM

Hollywood United F.C.	2–0	San Diego United

Scottsdale Sports Complex Field 2

May 17
9:00 PM

Sonoma County Sol	0–0	Arizona Sahuaros

Scottsdale Sports Complex Field 2
May 17
9:00 PM

Salinas Valley Samba	0–2	Rockstar United

Scottsdale Sports Complex Field 3
May 17
9:00 PM

Santa Cruz County Breakers	1–1	San Diego United

Scottsdale Sports Complex Field 4
May 17
9:00 PM

Banat Arsenal	2–3	Hollywood United F.C.

Scottsdale Sports Complex Field 1

===== Final match =====
May 18
11:00 AM

Arizona Sahuaros	1–0	Hollywood United F.C.

Scottsdale Sports Complex Field 1

== See also ==
- 2008 U.S. Open Cup
- United States Soccer Federation
- Lamar Hunt U.S. Open Cup
- Major League Soccer
- United Soccer Leagues
- USASA
- National Premier Soccer League
