= Mohanta =

Mohanta is an Indian surname. Notable people include:

- Imone Mohanta (born 1984), Canadian–American soccer player
- Madhumita Mohanta, West Bengal chef
- Mamata Mohanta, Odisha politician

== See also ==
- Ashutosh Mohunta (1953–2020), Indian judge
