= Las Vegas Dustdevils =

Former American indoor soccer team

The Las Vegas Dustdevils were an indoor soccer team based in Las Vegas Valley, Nevada, that played in the Continental Indoor Soccer League (CISL). The team won the league championship in 1994, but folded after their second season.

== History ==
On December 1, 1992, the Dustdevils became a charter member of the newly established Continental Indoor Soccer League. The team ownership, Nevada Pro Sports, planned to play their home games at the MGM Grand Garden Arena, but the facility was not completed until late 1993, causing the Dustdevils to sit out the league’s first season. In 1994, Las Vegas, coached by Guy Newman, finished with a 17–11 regular season record. Once in the playoffs, the team ran to the league title, defeating the Dallas Sidekicks two games to one in the championship series. In 1995, the Dustdevils moved to the Thomas & Mack Center. Despite having a losing record, they made the playoffs, but lost in the quarterfinals. The team withdrew from the league and disbanded following the loss. They averaged just under 3,000 fans at their home games.

=== Year-by-year ===
Year	Record	Regular season	Playoffs	Avg. attendance
1994	17–11	3rd Western	Champions	2,709
1995	13–15	3rd Western	Quarterfinal	3,274
2	30–26	–	–	2,992

== Honor ==
League Championship

- Winner (1): 1994

Championship MVP

- Branko Segota: 1994
