= Emigrantes das Ilhas =

- Full name: Futebol Clube Emigrantes das Ilhas Cabo Verde
- Founded: 1987
- Ground: Parmenter Playground; Brockton, Massachusetts
- Capacity: 500
- Owner: (Cape Verde) Carlos Amado
- Head Coach: (Cape Verde) Bobby Monteiro
- League: New England Luso American Soccer League; USASA
Home colors	Away colors

Futebol Clube Emigrantes das Ilhas Cabo Verde ("Emigrants of the Cape Verde Islands Football Club"), also known as Emigrantes das Ilhas or simply Emigrantes, is an American amateur soccer team based in Brockton, Massachusetts, United States. Founded in 1987, the team plays in Region I of the United States Adult Soccer Association, a network of amateur leagues at the fifth tier of the American Soccer Pyramid.

The team plays its home games at the Parmenter Playground in Brockton, Massachusetts. The team's colors are blue and white.

== History ==
Emigrantes das Ilhas was founded in 1987 by members of the Portuguese-speaking communities in Massachusetts originally from the Western Azores and Cape Verde. The name of the club translates as "Emigrants of the Islands". The team plays in the New England Luso American Soccer League, which is a member of the United States Adult Soccer Association Region I group of leagues. Emigrantes were the NELASA champions in 2004, and won the 2008 Massachusetts State Cup.

Emigrantes narrowly failed to qualify for the 2007 Lamar Hunt U.S. Open Cup, overcoming National Premier Soccer League side Queen City before falling to Danbury United in the final round of their regional qualification tournament.

They qualified for the final stages of the 2009 Lamar Hunt U.S. Open Cup by beating the New York Pancyprian-Freedoms and Danbury United, before losing 3-2 after extra time in the first round to USL Second Division side Western Mass Pioneers. Emigrantes's goals against Western Mass were scored by Zico Viega and Valdir Fernandes.

== Players ==
=== 2009 USOC roster ===
Note: Flags indicate national team as defined under FIFA eligibility rules; some limited exceptions apply. Players may hold more than one non-FIFA nationality.

No.	Pos.	Nation	Player
—	DF	CPV	Carlos Amado
—	MF	CPV	Denivaldo Da Silva
—	DF	CPV	Felipe Depina
—	DF	POR	Carlos Fernandes
—	DF	USA	Kyle Courteau
—	FW	CPV	Valdir Fernandes
—	MF	CPV	Joao Fidalgo

No.	Pos.	Nation	Player
—	DF	CPV	Carlos Gomes
—	MF	CPV	Jairson Jesus
—	FW	CPV	Luis Landim
—	GK	CPV	Jordan Mota
—	FW	CPV	Cassio Ribeiro
—	MF	POR	Carlos Semedo
—	FW	CPV	Zico Viega

== Year-by-year ==
Year	Division	League	Regular season	Playoffs	Open Cup
2007	5	USASA			Did not qualify
2009	5	USASA			First Round

== Head coaches ==
- (Cape Verde) Carlos Amado
- (Cape Verde) Bobby Monteiro

== Stadia ==
- Parmenter Playground; Brockton, Massachusetts
