= Andrei Gotsmanov =

Belarusian footballer (born 1986)

Personal information
- Full name: Andrei Sergeevich Gotsmanov
- Date of birth: 6 May 1986 (age 40)
- Place of birth: Minsk, Soviet Union
- Height: 5 ft 8 in (1.73 m)
- Position: Midfielder

College career
Years	Team	Apps	(Gls)
2004–2008	Creighton Bluejays		

Senior career*
Years	Team	Apps	(Gls)
2009	402 FC		
2009	Minnesota Thunder	1	(0)
2010–2011	NSC Minnesota Stars	44	(3)
2015–2016	Minnesota United FC	6	(0)
- * Club domestic league appearances and goals as of 12 April 2016

Andrei Sergeevich Gotsmanov (Russian: Андрей Сергеевич Гоцманов; born 6 May 1986) is a Belarusian footballer.

== Career ==
=== College ===
Gotsmanov grew up in Woodbury, Minnesota and played college soccer at Creighton University, with whom he earned the Missouri Valley Conference Player of the Year Award and was named MVC Tournament MVP. Moreover, Gotsmanov was also awarded a first-team selection on the 2008 NSCAA/adidas Men's Division I All-America Team, as well as a Hermann Trophy semi-finalist.

=== Professional ===
Gotsmanov was drafted in the second round (24th overall) of the 2009 MLS SuperDraft by New England Revolution, but opted to finish college before turning pro.

After graduating Gotsmanov attempted to re-join Revolution, but was unsuccessful as the Revolution would have had to drop a player from their squad in order to sign him. As a result, Gotsmanov went on trial with Sweden's Mjällby AIF. Despite scoring twice in a friendly for Mjällby, he was not offered a contract.

Upon his return from Sweden, Gotsmanov played with the Nebraska-based amateur team 402 FC which qualified for the 2009 Lamar Hunt U.S. Open Cup; he scored in the team's 3-2 first round loss to the Minnesota Thunder, but impressed the Thunder's coaches with his performance. He signed with the Thunder in July 2009, and made his debut for them on 11 July 2009, in a 3–0 win over Montreal Impact. On 17 February 2010 signed with new founded NSC Minnesota Stars of the USSF Division 2. He re-signed with the club, now playing in the North American Soccer League, on 22 March 2011.

Gotsmanov was re-signed by Minnesota United FC (which was re-branded from the NSC Minnesota Stars following the teams purchase prior to the 2013 season by Bill Mcguire) on 13 August 2015. Gotsmanoav was released on 12 April 2016.

== Personal ==
Andrei is the son of former professional footballer Sergey Gotsmanov, a four-time Belarusian Footballer of the Year who played for the Soviet Union at the 1988 UEFA European Football Championship. He was born in Minsk, then part of the Soviet Union, but came to the United States with his family in 1996 when his father signed to play for Minnesota Thunder. He also has an older brother, Sasha, who played for the Colorado Rapids and the former professional club Minnesota Thunder.
