= Hollywood United F.C. =

American amateur soccer team

Hollywood United
- Full name: Hollywood United Football Club
- Founded: 1988
- Ground: Crossroads High School; Santa Monica, Los Angeles, California
- Owners: (England) Steve Jones (Australia) Anthony LaPaglia
- Head Coaches: Brendan Bourke (O-40s) (United States) Mark Tabberner (O-30s) (United States) Tom Tate (LAPL)
- League: Los Angeles Olympic Soccer League
Home colors	Away colors	Third colors

Hollywood United is an American amateur soccer team based in Los Angeles, California. Founded in 1988, the team plays in Region IV of the United States Adult Soccer Association, a network of amateur leagues at the fifth tier of the American soccer pyramid.

== History ==
=== Origins ===
Hollywood United was founded in the late-1980s by a group of British expatriates who frequented the Cat & Fiddle, an English-style pub on Sunset Boulevard in the heart of Hollywood, California. The original team was made up of several U.S.-based British celebrities from the world of music, film and television, including Paul Cook and Steve Jones of the Sex Pistols, Billy Duffy and Ian Astbury of The Cult, and Vivian Campbell of Def Leppard. Word eventually spread throughout the entertainment world about the club and its players and, before long, not only other well-known stars, but also former national team soccer players from around the world asked to play.

Initially, Hollywood United basically had one team that competed in different Sunday leagues around Los Angeles, including the Los Angeles Metro League and the Glendale League. It was loosely organized and comprised roughly of the same 20 players in all games.

=== 2003–2007 ===
By the mid-2000s, there were two Hollywood United teams: an over-30s squad that competed in the Los Angeles Premier League from 2003 to 2005, and then in the now-defunct Olympic Soccer League from 2005–2006, and a Sunday League team that of older players that did not want to compete with the younger players. The over-30s team started to be the focus of international notoriety when people such as actors Anthony LaPaglia, Dermot Mulroney, Jason Statham, Brandon Routh, Ralf Little, Donal Logue, Gilles Marini and Jimmy Jean-Louis, singers Robbie Williams and Ziggy Marley, film director Danny Cannon, Colorado Rapids veteran Paul Bravo, and former international soccer players Vinnie Jones, Eric Wynalda, John Harkes, Alexi Lalas, Richard Gough and Frank Leboeuf, began playing regularly for the team.

=== 2008 U.S. Open Cup Run ===
Hollywood United qualified for the 2008 Lamar Hunt U.S. Open Cup by going 3-0-0 in a group with National Premier Soccer League's Santa Cruz County Breakers, San Diego United and Phoenix Banat Arsenal. They then advanced to the first round to take on the Portland Timbers of the USL First Division. Hollywood stunned the Timbers by beating them 3-2 thanks to penalties from Matt Taylor, but were defeated 6-0 by Seattle Sounders in the second round.

== Teams ==
=== Hollywood United Hitmen ===
The Hollywood United Hitmen were formed in early 2009 and compete in the USL Premier Development League, having acquired the franchise rights from the San Fernando Valley Quakes. They play in the "Stadium by the Sea" at Palisades Charter High School in the Los Angeles neighborhood of Pacific Palisades.

=== Los Angeles Premier League ===
Hollywood United LAPL over-30 team plays its home games at Crossroads High School in Santa Monica, California. This is the team that was formed out of the remnants of the O-30 Olympic League side that brought HUFC a considerable amount of notoriety.

=== Over 30s (Tabo's Army) ===
Tabo's Army is an over-30s side that competes in the Los Angeles Metro League at Griffith Park.

=== Over 40s (Dad's Army) ===
Dad's Army consists of most of the original Hollywood United team, and competes in the City of Los Angeles Metro Soccer League Senior Division. Over the years, the team has featured players such as Vinnie Jones, Steve Jones, Billy Duffy, Vivian Campbell and Paul Cook, and currently includes film director and producer Danny Cannon on the roster.

=== HUFC 7s ===
The Hollywood United 7-a-side teams compete in the Santa Monica Adult Soccer League. The men's team features players from all teams, and has recently included Anthony LaPaglia, Jason Statham, Steve Jones, Frank Leboeuf, Olivier Biaggi & Jason Harris. HUFC no longer fields a 7's team.

== Charity work ==
Some of Hollywood United's recent charity events include:

- Hollywood United vs Simon Bolivar XI, October 30, 2010. A game to raise funds for the family of murdered El Salvadoran player Nelson Rivera, played at Miguel Contreras High School in downtown Los Angeles. Players for Hollywood in this game included Che Bernardi, Jimmy Jean-Louis, Anthony La Paglia, Donal Logue, Jason Mathot, Humberto Mier, Christian Olde Wolbers and Michael Raymond-James.
- Champions United v. Hollywood United, 22 November 2008. As part of the activities surrounding the 2008 MLS Cup Hollywood United will host a special charity match. All proceeds from the match, including donations collected on the day of the game, will be for people whose lives were severely affected by the devastation of Hurricane Ike. Players for Hollywood in this game included Ziggy Marley, Santiago Cabrera, Jimmy Jean-Louis and John Harkes.
- Los Angeles Galaxy v. Hollywood United, November 4, 2007. Following the string of devastating wildfires in Southern California, the Los Angeles Galaxy, Hollywood United FC and the Herbalife Family Foundation joined together to host a special charity match. All proceeds from the match, including donations collected on the day of the game, went towards the American Red Cross and The Salvation Army to aid in their efforts to assist those affected by the wild fires. Players for Hollywood in this game included, in addition to their usual celebrities, Mauricio Cienfuegos, Joe-Max Moore, Jorge Campos and Yari Allnutt.
- Match to Benefit Survivors of Torture, July 22, 2007. Proceeds from the event benefited PTV, a nonprofit organization dedicated to providing free medical care, psychological evaluation and other essential social services to alleviate the suffering and health consequences of torture victims living in Los Angeles. Funds raised at the event also benefited the Hollywood United Youth Soccer Association (HUYSA), an organization dedicated to supporting youth soccer programs.
- Match to Benefit Children of Puerto Vallarta, Mexico, June 15, 2007. Hollywood United FC participated in a match against a team of Mexican International legends. Luis Hernández, Benjamin Galindo, and Adolfo Rios spearheaded the Mexican team against Hollywood United regulars Eric Wynalda, Richard Gough, and Jimmy Jean-Louis. The event raised thousands of dollars to benefit the homeless children of Puerto Vallarta, Mexico.

== Sponsors ==
- Puma AG
