= Imone Mohanta =

Canadian-born American soccer player

Personal information
- Date of birth: 1984 (age 41–42)
- Height: 1.76 m (5 ft 9 in)
- Positions: Defender; midfielder

Senior career*
Years	Team	Apps	(Gls)
2008–2009	San Diego United	7	(0)
2009–2010	Churchill Brothers S.C.	14	(2)
- * Club domestic league appearances and goals

Imone Mohanta (born 1984) is a retired Canadian–American professional soccer player, who last played for Churchill Brothers S.C. in the I-League as a defender. He is currently the head coach of Stanford men's team of the West Coast Soccer Association.

== Earlier career ==
Mohanta, graduated from San Diego State University, began his professional career with newly formed San Diego United of National Premier Soccer League in 2008. He played for a single season until 2009, under coaching of Guy Newman, then manager of the San Diego–based side.

== India ==
While playing in tournaments organized by the Indian community in the United States, Mohanta was encouraged to play in the Indian I-League by players from JCT Mills FC. Eventually, he signed for I-League side Churchill Brothers SC, where he almost scored an individual goal on debut against Salgaocar SC.

== Managerial career ==
After retirement, Mohanta began his coaching career in West Coast Soccer Association as a head coach.

== Mohanta Sports ==
Mohanta, a football lover started his footballing management division named Mohanta Sports, which is a group of sports attorneys, work collaboratively with FIFA licensed agents to ensure the highest level of player and coaching representation.
