= Guy Newman (soccer) =

Anglo-American soccer player

Personal information
- Date of birth: 26 November 1957 (age 68)
- Place of birth: Portsmouth, England
- Position: Defender

Senior career*
| Years | Team | Apps | (Gls) |
| 1977 | Maccabi Los Angeles | | |
| 1978 | Tampa Bay Rowdies | 0 | (0) |
| 1979 | Fort Lauderdale Strikers | 5 | (0) |
| 1980 | Miami Americans | | |
| 1981–1984 | San Diego Sockers (indoor) | 38 | (5) |
| 1982–1984 | San Diego Sockers | 11 | (0) |
| 1982–1987 | San Diego Sockers (MISL) | 45 | (6) |

Managerial career
- 1986–1993: San Diego Sockers (assistant)
- 1994–1995: Las Vegas Dustdevils
- 1996–2000: Kansas City Wizards (assistant)
- 2000–2008: Del Mar Sharks
- 2009–: San Diego United
- Encinitas Express
- East County Surf Soccer Club
- * Club domestic league appearances and goals

Guy Newman (born 26 November 1957) is an English-American retired soccer defender who played in the North American Soccer League, American Soccer League and the Major Indoor Soccer League. He is currently coaching at East County Surf Soccer Club.

== Player ==
The son of English player and coach, Ron Newman, Guy grew up in the United States. In 1977, he played for the semi professional Maccabi Los Angeles club when it won the National Challenge Cup. He turned professional in 1978 with the Tampa Bay Rowdies of the North American Soccer League, but injured his shoulder less than 30 seconds into an indoor friendly vs Norwich City F.C. He was never able to break into the first team outdoors and moved on to the Fort Lauderdale Strikers in 1979. In 1980, he followed his father to the expansion Miami Americans of the American Soccer League. The team lasted only one season before folding. When Ron Newman moved to coach the San Diego Sockers in 1980, he brought in Guy. In 1982, Guy took the field with the Sockers and played three outdoor seasons with them. He also played forty-five regular season games for the Sockers indoor team which played in both the NASL indoor circuit as well as in the Major Indoor Soccer League. Newman retired from playing professionally in 1987.

== Coach ==
After retiring as a player, Newman assisted his father at the Sockers from 1987 to 1993. In March 1994, he was hired as the head coach of the Las Vegas Dustdevils which won the 1994 Continental Indoor Soccer League championship. The Dustdevils folded at the end of the 1995 season. In 1996, Newman became an assistant to his father at the Kansas City Wizards of Major League Soccer. In 2000, he became the head coach of the Del Mar Sharks and in 2009 became Director of Coaching Encinitas Express.
