= Aegean Hawks =

- Full name: Aegean Hawks Football Club
- Nickname: Hawks
- Founded: 1996; 30 years ago
- Ground: Dulles SportsPlex; Sterling, Virginia
- Owner: Jonathan Knight
- Head Coach: Doug Homer
- League: Washington Premier League (USASA)
Home colors	Away colors

Aegean Hawks FC is an American amateur soccer team based in Arlington, Virginia, United States. Founded in 1996, the team plays in Region I of the United States Adult Soccer Association, a network of amateur leagues at the fifth tier of the American Soccer Pyramid.

The team plays its home games at the Dulles SportsPlex in nearby Sterling, Virginia. The team's colors are black, red, and white.

== History ==
The Aegean Hawks Football Club was founded in 1996 by a group of Greek and Cypriot university students from the Arlington, Virginia area. The team plays in the Washington Premier League, which is a member of the United States Adult Soccer Association Region I group of leagues. The Hawks are record 8-time WPL champions, having taken the title in the Spring 2006, Fall 2006, Spring 2007, Fall 2007, Spring 2008, Fall 2008, Spring 2009 and Fall 2009 seasons. They also won the USASA National Amateur Cup in 2009, in addition to numerous other local and regional trophies.

The Hawks also have a good pedigree in qualifying for the Lamar Hunt U.S. Open Cup. They made their first appearance in 2007, overcoming Greek American AA and AC United in their regional qualification group before falling to USL Second Division pro side Harrisburg City Islanders in the first round of tournament proper.

They returned to the tournament in 2009 by beating the Vereinigung Erzgebirge and Charm City FC, before losing 1-0 to USL Second Division side Real Maryland Monarchs in a game which was abandoned in the 74th minute due to lightning.

After failing to advance far enough in regional USASA Open Cup qualifiers in 2010 and 2011, the Hawks made a triumphant return to the Lamar Hunt US Open Cup in 2012 to knock off the Carolina Dynamo (Professional Development League) in the first round. The Hawks fell to the Richmond Kickers in the second round by a score of 4-0.

== Year-by-year ==
Year	Division	League	Regular season	Playoffs	Open Cup
2007	5	USASA			First Round
2008	5	USASA			Region I finals
2009	5	USASA			First Round
2010	5	USASA			Region I quarterfinals
2011	5	USASA			Did not enter
2012	5	USASA			Second Round
2013	5	USASA			Did not enter
2014	5	USASA			Did not enter
2015	5	USASA			Did not enter
2016	5	USASA			2nd Qualifying Round
2017	5	USASA			1st Qualifying Round
2018	5	USASA			1st Qualifying Round
2019	5	USASA			2nd Qualifying Round
2020	5	USASA			Cancelled due to COVID-19
2021	5	USASA			Cancelled due to COVID-19
2022	5	USASA			2nd Qualifying Round
2023	5	USASA			1st Qualifying Round
2024	5	USASA			2nd Qualifying Round
2025	5	USASA			4th Qualifying Round
2026	5	USASA			1st Qualifying Round
2027	5	USASA			2nd Qualifying Round

== Head coach ==
- (United States) Doug Homer (2008–2010)
- (United States) Jonathan Knight (2002–present)

== Assistant coach ==
- (United States) Doug Homer (2010–present)

== Stadia ==
- Maryland SoccerPlex; Germantown, Maryland (2008)
