= 2009 U.S. Open Cup =

2009 Lamar Hunt U.S. Open Cup
Tournament details
- Country: United States
- Teams: 40

Final positions
- Champions: Seattle Sounders FC (1st title)
- Runners-up: D.C. United
- 2010–11 CONCACAF Champions League: Seattle Sounders FC

Tournament statistics
- Matches played: 39
- Goals scored: 107 (2.74 per match)
- Top goal scorer(s): Taiwo Atieno; Stephen King; Sébastien Le Toux; Keita Mandjou; Randi Patterson; Melvin Tarley (3 goals each)

The 2009 Lamar Hunt U.S. Open Cup was the 96th edition of the USSF's annual national soccer championship, running from June through early September.

The tournament proper features teams from the top five levels of the American Soccer Pyramid. These five levels, namely Major League Soccer, the United Soccer Leagues (First Division, Second Division, and Premier Development League), and the United States Adult Soccer Association, each have their own separate qualification process to trim their ranks down to their final eight team delegations in the months leading up to the start of the tournament proper. The eight MLS clubs receive byes into the third round, while the remaining 32 teams play in the first two round with brackets influenced by geography.

Seattle Sounders FC defeated defending-champion D.C. United 2–1 in the final at RFK Stadium in Washington, D.C. Both clubs had started in the MLS qualification tourney, and ended up playing 6 matches each.

== Matchdays ==
Match pairings were announced on May 27.

Date	Round	Notes
June 9	First round	32 USL and USASA clubs enter
June 16	Second round	
June 30/July 1	Third round	8 MLS clubs enter
July 7	Quarterfinals	
July 21	Semifinals	
September 2	Final	

== Teams ==
As in the previous tournament, forty teams qualified to the tournament. The qualifying process for MLS took the form of an eight-team play-off tournament. The top six finishers, regardless of conference, in 2008 were given six of the berths into the Third Round. The eight remaining U.S.-based clubs competed for the final two berths via a playoff.

Continuing the format of recent seasons, no qualification process was needed for USL-1 and USL-2 as each level has exactly eight U.S.-based clubs for the 2009 season. The PDL announced that four selected early season games will again double as qualifying matches, as they had in recent years. Each division received a berth, since there are eight divisions instead of the ten that existed in 2008. The qualifying process for the USASA took the form of four regional tournaments, with the two finalists in each region being awarded berths.

Major League Soccer (8 teams)

- Chicago Fire
- Chivas USA
- Columbus Crew
- D.C. United
- Houston Dynamo
- Kansas City Wizards
- New England Revolution
- Seattle Sounders FC

USL First Division (8 teams)

- Austin Aztex FC
- Carolina RailHawks FC
- Charleston Battery
- Cleveland City Stars
- Miami FC
- Minnesota Thunder
- Portland Timbers
- Rochester Rhinos

USL Second Division (8 teams)

- Charlotte Eagles
- Crystal Palace Baltimore
- Harrisburg City Islanders
- Pittsburgh Riverhounds
- Real Maryland Monarchs
- Richmond Kickers
- Western Mass Pioneers
- Wilmington Hammerheads

USL PDL (8 teams)

- Chicago Fire Premier
- El Paso Patriots
- Kitsap Pumas
- Mississippi Brilla
- Ocean City Barons
- Orange County Blue Star
- Reading Rage
- St. Louis Lions

USASA (8 teams)

- Region I: Aegean Hawks, Emigrantes das Ilhas
- Region II: 402 FC, Milwaukee Bavarians
- Region III: Atlanta FC (NPSL), Lynch's Irish Pub F.C.
- Region IV: Sonoma County Sol, Arizona Sahuaros

== Open Cup bracket ==
Second Round winners advance to play one of 8 clubs in 16-team knockout tournament
Home teams listed on top of bracket

First Round
Harrisburg City Islanders	4
Reading Rage	1
Western Mass Pioneers (aet)	3
Emigrantes das Ilhas	2

Second Round
Harrisburg City Islanders (aet/pso)	0 (4)
Western Mass Pioneers	0 (3)

First Round
Ocean City Barons	3
Crystal Palace Baltimore	0
Real Maryland Monarchs	1
Aegean Hawks	0

Second Round
Ocean City Barons (aet)	1
Real Maryland Monarchs	0

First Round
Carolina RailHawks	2
Richmond Kickers	1
Wilmington Hammerheads	2
Charlotte Eagles	0

Second Round
Carolina RailHawks (aet/PSO)	3 (3)
Wilmington Hammerheads	3 (4)

First Round
Miami FC	2
Lynch's FC	1
Charleston Battery	2
Atlanta FC	0

Second Round
Miami FC	0
Charleston Battery	1

First Round
Rochester Rhinos	1 (4)
Pittsburgh Riverhounds	1 (2)
Cleveland City Stars	3
St. Louis Lions	0

Second Round
Rochester Rhinos (aet)	2
Cleveland City Stars	1

First Round
Minnesota Thunder	3
402 FC	2
Chicago Fire Premier	3
Milwaukee Bavarians	1

Second Round
Minnesota Thunder	4
Chicago Fire Premier	0

First Round
Austin Aztex	2
Mississippi Brilla	0
El Paso Patriots	2
Arizona Sahuaros	1

Second Round
Austin Aztex	2
El Paso Patriots	0

First Round
Orange County Blue Star	2
Sonoma County Sol	5
Kitsap Pumas	0
Portland Timbers	3

Second Round
Sonoma County Sol	0
Portland Timbers	3

Third Round
D.C. United	2
Ocean City Barons	0
New England Revolution	1
Harrisburg City Islanders	2
Rochester Rhinos	1 (5)
Columbus Crew	1 (3)
Wilmington Hammerheads	1
Chicago Fire	0
Portland Timbers	1
Seattle Sounders FC	2
Minnesota Thunder	3 (2)
Kansas City Wizards	3 (4)
Austin Aztex	0
Houston Dynamo	2
Charleston Battery	3
Chivas USA	1

Quarterfinals
D.C. United	2
Harrisburg City Islanders	1
Rochester Rhinos	2
Wilmington Hammerheads	1
Seattle Sounders FC	1
Kansas City Wizards	0
Houston Dynamo	4
Charleston Battery	0

Semifinals
D.C. United	2
Rochester Rhinos	1
Seattle Sounders FC (aet)	2
Houston Dynamo	1

Final
D.C. United	1
Seattle Sounders FC	2

== Schedule ==
Note: Scorelines use the standard U.S. convention of placing the home team on the right-hand side of box scores.

=== First round ===
June 9, 2009	Sonoma County Sol (USASA)	5–2	Orange County Blue Star (PDL)	Irvine, California
5:00 PM EDT	Hurst 5'; Percell 55', 81'; Lafon 73'; Larson 78'	Report	Turner (red card) 60'; Stoll 80'; Ponce 83'	Stadium: Concordia University; Attendance: 50; Referee: Miguel Chicas

June 9, 2009	Milwaukee Bavarians (USASA)	1–3	Chicago Fire Premier (PDL)	Bridgeview, Illinois
6:00 PM EDT	Sabich (yellow card) 30'; Meier (yellow card) 40'; Zenoni 63' (pen.), (yellow card) 74'; Asen (yellow card) 88'	Report	Braun 26'; Akpan 28'; Milien 53'; Maurer (red card) 63'	Stadium: Toyota Park Practice Field; Referee: Pawel Wydra

June 9, 2009	Charlotte Eagles (USL-2)	0–2	Wilmington Hammerheads (USL-2)	Wilmington, North Carolina
7:00 PM EDT	Shak (yellow card) 63'	Report	Watson 82'; Bundy (yellow card) 88'; Hufstader 90'	Stadium: Legion Stadium; Referee: Abbas Piran

June 9, 2009	Emigrantes das Ilhas (USASA)	2–3 (a.e.t.)	Western Mass Pioneers (USL-2)	Ludlow, Massachusetts
7:00 PM EDT	Viega 16'; Fernandes 62' (pen.)	Report	Willis 45+'; Neil Krause 73'; Barbosa 98'	Stadium: Lusitano Stadium; Attendance: 1,401; Referee: Niko Bratsis

June 9, 2009	Pittsburgh Riverhounds (USL-2)	1–1 (a.e.t.) (2–4 p)	Rochester Rhinos (USL-1)	Rochester, New York
7:00 PM EDT	Bonseu 22' (yellow card) 1' (yellow-red card) 72'; Gray (yellow card) 29'; Evans (yellow card) 36'; Katic (yellow card) 48'; Salsi (yellow card) 90'; Riley (yellow card) 118'	Report	Bertz (yellow card) 57'; Salles (yellow card) 67'; Nurse (yellow card) 71'; Atieno 90+'	Stadium: Rochester Rhinos Stadium; Attendance: 2,723; Referee: Jason Krnac
	Penalties
	Hayden (penalty scored); Salsi (penalty missed); Evans (penalty missed); Brown (penalty scored)		(penalty missed) Atieno; (penalty scored) Gregor; (penalty scored) Bertz; (penalty scored) Salles; (penalty scored) Fitzpatrick

June 9, 2009	Richmond Kickers (USL-2)	1–2	Carolina RailHawks (USL-1)	Cary, North Carolina
7:00 PM EDT	Bulow 20' (pen.); Kalungi (yellow card) 59'	Report	Paladini 14'; Diallo 48'; McKenney (yellow card) 54'; Kabwe (yellow card) 76'	Stadium: WakeMed Soccer Park; Attendance: 1,362; Referee: Daniel Fitzgerald

June 9, 2009	St. Louis Lions (PDL)	0–3	Cleveland City Stars (USL-1)	Bedford, Ohio
7:00 PM EDT		Report	Stewart 29'; Pierre-Louis 33'; Gillespie 68'	Stadium: Middlefield Cheese Stadium; Attendance: 827; Referee: Mikael Lundqvist

June 9, 2009	402 FC (USASA)	2–3	Minnesota Thunder (USL-1)	Blaine, Minnesota
7:05 PM EDT	Gotsmanov 12' (yellow card) 84'; Schmitz 57' (yellow card) 38' (yellow-red card) 84'; Walters (red card) 90'	Report	Saint-Preux (yellow card) 25' (goal) 40'; Cvilikas 30', 46'	Stadium: National Sports Center; Attendance: 245; Referee: Elias Bazakos

June 9, 2009	Reading Rage (PDL)	1–4	Harrisburg City Islanders (USL-2)	Harrisburg, Pennsylvania
7:05 PM ET	Ports 8'; Oblio (yellow card) 28'; Smith (yellow card) 31'; Wheeler (yellow card) 57'; O'Connor (yellow card) 59'	Report	Fisher 1'; Pelletier (yellow card) 22'; Reinberg (yellow card) 30'; Shipalane 42'; Paterson 49'; Severs 60' (pen.); Velten (yellow card) 68'	Stadium: Skyline Sports Complex; Referee: Ian Bongaardt

June 9, 2009	Atlanta FC (USASA)	0–2	Charleston Battery (USL-1)	Charleston, South Carolina
7:30 PM EDT	Sand (yellow card) 24'; Venn (red card) 28'; Munilla (yellow card) 40' (yellow-red card) 66'; Liza (yellow card) 42'; Sandoval (yellow card) 49' (yellow-red card) 69'; Quintero (yellow card) 72'	Report	Patterson 1'; Yoshitake 32'; Williams (yellow card) 64'	Stadium: Blackbaud Stadium; Attendance: 1,318; Referee: Alan Schechtman

June 9, 2009	Lynch's Irish Pub FC (USASA)	1–2	Miami FC (USL-1)	Miami, Florida
8:00 PM	Catullo 35'; Schell (yellow card) 52'; Command (yellow card) 55'	Report	Serna (yellow card) 51' (goal) 65'; Araujo 64'; Marcina (yellow card) 82'; Hannigan (yellow card) 90'	Stadium: Tropical Park Stadium; Referee: Brian Poeschel

June 9, 2009	Mississippi Brilla (PDL)	0–2	Austin Aztex (USL-1)	Austin, Texas
8:30 PM EDT	Lawrence (yellow card) 16'	Report	Harwell 18'; Caugherty (yellow card) 32'; Johnson 64'; Pope (yellow card) 69'; Alcala (yellow card) 73'	Stadium: Nelson Field; Referee: Matthew Foerster

June 9, 2009	Arizona Sahuaros (USASA)	1–2	El Paso Patriots (PDL)	El Paso, Texas
10:00 PM EDT	Kellar 67'	Report	Morín 27'; Moreira 59'	Stadium: Patriot Stadium; Referee: Carlos Salas

June 9, 2009	Portland Timbers (USL-1)	3–0	Kitsap Pumas (PDL)	Bremerton, Washington
10:00 PM EDT	Farber (yellow card) 33' (goal) 46'; Savage (yellow card) 37'; McLaughlin 90'; Hayes 90'	Report	Kerr (yellow card) 11'; Megson (yellow card) 74'; Wheelock (yellow card) 90'	Stadium: Memorial Stadium; Referee: Josh Wilkens

June 10, 2009	Aegean Hawks (USASA)	0–1	Real Maryland Monarchs (USL-2)	Rockville, Maryland
6:30 PM EDT Note: Match stopped at 74' due to lightning.	Goldman (red card) 16'	Report	Cordeiro 14'	Stadium: Richard Montgomery HS; Referee: Matthew Kreitzer

June 10, 2009	Crystal Palace Baltimore (USL-2)	0–3	Ocean City Barons (PDL)	Ocean City, New Jersey
7:00 PM EDT		Report	Carmichael 7', 33'; Noone 78'	Stadium: Carey Stadium; Referee: Hossam Saad

=== Second round ===
June 16, 2009	Real Maryland Monarchs (USL-2)	0–1 (a.e.t.)	Ocean City Barons (PDL)	Ocean City, New Jersey
7:00 PM EDT	Brooks (yellow card) 72'	Report	Swetra (yellow card) 78'; Noone 108' (pen.)	Stadium: Carey Stadium; Attendance: 350; Referee: Garry Beauliere

June 16, 2009	Wilmington Hammerheads (USL-2)	3–3 (a.e.t.) (4–3 p)	Carolina RailHawks (USL-1)	Cary, North Carolina
7:00 PM EDT	Tatters (yellow card) 18'; Bagley 21'; Watson (yellow card) 32'; Karalexis 93'; Falvey (yellow card) 120'; Bundy 120+'	Report	Diallo 34'; Lowery (yellow card) 35'; Cunliffe (yellow card) 43'; McKenny (yellow card) 95'; Plotkin 98'; Schulte (yellow card) 105'; Glinton 118'	Stadium: WakeMed Soccer Park; Referee: Mark Kadlecik
	Penalties
	Murray (penalty scored); Bundy (penalty scored); Briggs (penalty scored); Watson (penalty scored)		(penalty missed) Paladini; (penalty scored) Cunliffe; (penalty scored) Glinton; (penalty scored) Plotkin; (penalty missed) Schulte

June 16, 2009	Cleveland City Stars (USL-1)	1–2 (a.e.t.)	Rochester Rhinos (USL-1)	Rochester, New York
7:00 PM EDT	Kljestan (yellow card) 25'; Stewart 59' (pen.), (yellow card) 66'; Aguilera (yellow card) 101'	Report	Vallow (yellow card) 59'; Nurse (yellow card) 70'; Salles (yellow card) 77'; Heins 82' (yellow card) 101'; Gregor (yellow card) 89'; Bertz 111'	Stadium: Marina Auto Stadium; Attendance: 2,788; Referee: Steve Montanino

June 16, 2009	Western Mass Pioneers (USL-2)	0–0 (a.e.t.) (3–4 p)	Harrisburg City Islanders (USL-2)	Harrisburg, Pennsylvania
7:05 PM EDT		Report		Stadium: Skyline Sports Complex; Referee: Ed Marco
	Penalties
	Molinari (penalty scored); Klukowski (penalty missed); Barbosa (penalty missed); Dubois (penalty scored); Deren (penalty scored); Tyrie (penalty missed)		(penalty scored) Severs; (penalty missed) Baker; (penalty missed) Velten; (penalty scored) Paterson; (penalty scored) Kasiguran; (penalty scored) Swartzendruber

June 16, 2009	Charleston Battery (USL-1)	1–0	Miami FC (USL-1)	Miami, Florida
8:00 PM EDT	Hemming 65' (pen.)	Report		Stadium: Tropical Park Stadium; Referee: Carlos Sandoval

June 16, 2009	Chicago Fire Premier (PDL)	0–4	Minnesota Thunder (USL-1)	Blaine, Minnesota
7:05 PM CDT	Adlard (yellow card) 79'	Report	Saint-Preux 23'; Cvilikas 39'; Clements (yellow card) 41'; Dyachenko (yellow card) 68'; Tarley 78', 81'	Stadium: National Sports Center; Attendance: 359; Referee: Fotis Bazakos

June 16, 2009	El Paso Patriots (PDL)	0–2	Austin Aztex (USL-1)	Austin, Texas
7:30 PM CDT	Castañeda (yellow card) 28'; Garcia (red card) 75'; Muniz (red card) 75'; Alvarez (red card) 77'	Report	McMahen 45+'; O'Brien 48'; Silva (yellow card) 69' (red card) 75'	Stadium: Nelson Field; Referee: Luis Guardia

June 16, 2009	Portland Timbers (USL-1)	3–0	Sonoma County Sol (USASA)	Santa Rosa, California
7:00 PM PDT	Josten 7'; Suzuki (yellow card) 45+1'; Mandjou 87', 90+1'	Report	M. Daly (yellow card) 51'	Stadium: Ernie Nevers Stadium; Attendance: 2,000 approx Referee: Andres Pfefferkorn

=== Third round ===
June 30, 2009	Harrisburg City Islanders (USL-2)	2–1 (a.e.t.)	New England Revolution (MLS)	New Britain, Connecticut
7:00 PM EDT	Calvano (yellow card) 51'; Odour 72'; Bloes 105'	Report	Larentowicz 38'; Osei (yellow card) 63'; Nyassi (yellow card) 67'; Colaluca (yellow card) 92' (yellow-red card) 117'	Stadium: Veteran's Stadium; Attendance: 3,100; Referee: Lee Suckle

June 30, 2009	Chicago Fire (MLS)	0–1	Wilmington Hammerheads (USL-2)	Wilmington, North Carolina
7:00 PM EDT	Soumaré (yellow card) 42'	Report	Walters (yellow card) 6'; Bundy 37'; Briggs (yellow card) 66'; Watson (yellow card) 70'	Stadium: Legion Stadium; Referee: Daniel Fitzgerald

June 30, 2009	Columbus Crew (MLS)	1–1 (a.e.t.) (3–5 p)	Rochester Rhinos (USL-1)	Rochester, New York
7:00 PM EDT	Oughton 37'	Report	Harden 32'	Stadium: Marina Auto Stadium; Attendance: 6,098; Referee: Shane Moody
	Penalties
	Ekpo (penalty scored); Moreno (penalty scored); Oughton (penalty missed); Garey (penalty scored)		(penalty scored) Kenton; (penalty scored) Salles; (penalty scored) Gregor; (penalty scored) Bertz; (penalty scored) Heins

June 30, 2009	Ocean City Barons (PDL)	0–2	D.C. United (MLS)	Boyds, Maryland
7:30 PM EDT	Brown (yellow card) 67'	Report	Gómez 74'; N'Silu 93'	Stadium: Maryland SoccerPlex; Attendance: 2,021; Referee: Jeff Gontarek

June 30, 2009	Chivas USA (MLS)	1–3	Charleston Battery (USL-1)	Charleston, South Carolina
7:30 PM EDT	Marsch 28'; Victorine (yellow card) 43'; Nagamura (yellow card) 54'; Harris (yellow card) 83'; Galindo (yellow card) 86'; Marsch (yellow card) 89'; Talley (red card) 90'	Report	Patterson 9', 45'; Hemming (yellow card) 66'; Wilson (yellow card) 86'; Treschuk (yellow card) 87'; Hudock (yellow card) 89'; Yoshitake 90+'	Stadium: Blackbaud Stadium; Attendance: 3,268; Referee: Mark Kadlecik

June 30, 2009	Kansas City Wizards (MLS)	3–3 (a.e.t.) (4–2 p)	Minnesota Thunder (USL-1)	Blaine, Minnesota
7:05 PM CDT	Kraus 17'; Thompson 20' (pen.); Wolff (yellow card) 103'; McKenzie 105+'	Report	Sánchez 41' (pen.), 84' (pen.); Arango (yellow card) 56'; Tarley (yellow card) 85' (goal) 117'	Stadium: National Sports Center; Attendance: 3,878; Referee: Chris Penso
	Penalties
	López (penalty scored); Wolff (penalty scored); Thompson (penalty scored); Gomez (penalty scored)		(penalty scored) Greenfield; (penalty scored) Sánchez; (penalty missed) Bass; (penalty missed) Weiler

July 1, 2009	Houston Dynamo (MLS)	2–0	Austin Aztex (USL-1)	Austin, Texas
7:30 PM CDT	Ashe 70'; Oduro 90'	Report	Caugherty (yellow card) 37'; Callahan (yellow card) 62'	Stadium: Nelson Field; Attendance: 4,826; Referee: Jeremy Vehar

July 1, 2009	Seattle Sounders FC (MLS)	2–1	Portland Timbers (USL-1)	Portland, Oregon
7:00 PM PDT	Ianni (yellow card) 5'; Levesque 1'; King 26'; Nyassi (yellow card) 59'; Riley (yellow card) 93+'	Report	Hayes (yellow card) 26'; Mandjou 43'; McManus (yellow card) 61'	Stadium: PGE Park; Attendance: 16,382 (SO); Referee: Yader Reyes

=== Quarterfinals ===
July 7, 2009	Wilmington Hammerheads (USL-2)	1–2	Rochester Rhinos (USL-1)	Rochester, New York
7:00 PM EDT	Walters (yellow card) 43'; Watson 72'	Report	Short (yellow card) 41'; Atieno 54'; Menyongar (yellow card) 62'; Gregor 67' (pen.), (yellow card) 69'	Stadium: Marina Auto Stadium; Attendance: 3,598; Referee: Niko Bratsis (Massachusetts)

July 7, 2009	Harrisburg City Islanders (USL-2)	1–2	D.C. United (MLS)	Boyds, Maryland
7:30 PM EDT	Oduor (red card) 49'; Paterson 64'	Report	Khumalo 8'; Jacobson 18'; N'Silu (yellow card) 83'; Gómez (yellow card) 86'	Stadium: Maryland SoccerPlex; Attendance: 2,137; Referee: Lee Suckle (New York)

July 7, 2009	Houston Dynamo (MLS)	4–0	Charleston Battery (USL-1)	Charleston, South Carolina
7:30 p.m. EDT	Cameron 16', 73'; Boswell 47'; Oduro 52'; Ustruck (yellow card) 53'	Report	Buete (yellow card) 1'; Treschuk (yellow card) 80'; Yoshitake (yellow card) 90+'	Stadium: Blackbaud Stadium; Attendance: 2,473; Referee: Tony Russo (Georgia)

July 7, 2009	Kansas City Wizards (MLS)	0–1	Seattle Sounders FC (MLS)	Tukwila, Washington
7:00 PM PDT	Hirsig (yellow card) 76' (yellow-red card) 93+'	Report	Montero (yellow card) 79'; Le Toux 89' (pen.)	Stadium: Starfire Sports Complex; Attendance: 4,352; Referee: Abbey Okulaja (Illinois)

=== Semifinals ===
July 21, 2009	Rochester Rhinos (USL-1)	1–2	D.C. United (MLS)	Boyds, Maryland
7:00 PM EDT	Gregor (yellow card) 18'; Atieno 68'; Bertz (yellow card) 88'		Jacobson (yellow card) 39'; Moreno 41' (pen.); John (yellow card) 42'; Khumalo 83'	Stadium: Maryland SoccerPlex; Attendance: 2,457; Referee: Abbey Okulaja (Illinois)

July 21, 2009	Houston Dynamo (MLS)	1–2 (a.e.t.)	Seattle Sounders FC (MLS)	Tukwila, Washington
7:00 PM PDT	James (yellow card) 30'; Boswell (yellow card) 30'; Akinbiyi 32'; Davis (yellow card) 42'; Mullan (yellow card) 70'; Chabala (yellow card) 91+'		Jaqua (yellow card) 62' (goal) 89'; Hurtado (yellow card) 67' (yellow-red card) 110'; Marshall (yellow card) 80'; King 94'	Stadium: Starfire Sports Complex; Attendance: 4,895; Referee: Edvin Jurisevic (Nebraska)

=== Final ===
September 2, 2009
7:30 PM EDT

Seattle Sounders FC (MLS)	2–1	D.C. United (MLS)
Ianni (yellow card) 25'; González (yellow card) 49'; Montero 67'; Vagenas (yellow card) 79'; Levesque 86'	(Report)	Wicks (red card) 69'; Simms 89'

RFK Stadium
Washington, D.C.
Attendance: 17,329
Referee: Alex Prus (South Carolina)

== Goal scorers ==
3 goals

- (Kenya) Taiwo Atieno (ROC)
- (United States) Brian Cvilikas (MIN)
- (Guinea) Keita Mandjou (POR)
- (France) Sébastien Le Toux (SEA)
- (United States) Stephen King (SEA)
- (Trinidad and Tobago) Randi Patterson (CHA)
- (Liberia) Melvin Tarley (MIN)

2 goals

- (United States) Kenny Bundy (WIL)
- (United States) Geoff Cameron (HOU)
- (United States) Byron Carmichael (OCC)
- (Ivory Coast) Hamed Diallo (CAR)
- (United States) Nate Jaqua (SEA)
- (United States) Roger Levesque (SEA)
- (United States) J.T. Noone (OCC)
- (Ghana) Dominic Oduro (HOU)
- (Scotland) Nicki Paterson (HAR)
- (United States) Shawn Percell (SON)
- (Haiti) Leonel Saint-Preux (MIN)
- (Mexico) Ricardo Sánchez (MIN)
- (Trinidad and Tobago) Ryan Stewart (CLE)
- (United States) Jamie Watson (WIL)
- (Japan) Tsuyoshi Yoshitake (CHA)
- (South Africa) Thabiso Khumalo (DC)

1 goal

- (Nigeria) Ade Akinbiyi (HOU)
- (United States) Andre Akpan (CHI)
- (Brazil) Paulo Araujo Jr. (MIA)
- (United States) Corey Ashe (HOU)

1 goal (continued)

- (United States) Chris Bagley (WIL)
- (United States) Almir Barbosa (WM)
- (United States) Kenney Bertz (ROC)
- (United States) Geoff Bloes (HAR)
- (Uganda) Tenywa Bonseu (PIT)
- (United States) Bobby Boswell (HOU)
- (United States) Freddie Braun (CHI)
- (United States) David Bulow (RIC)
- (United States) Carl Catullo (LYN)
- (United States) Ryan Cordeiro (RM)
- (United States) Brian Farber (POR)
- (Portugal) Carlos Fernandes (EI)
- (United States) Steve Fisher (HAR)
- (United States) Steve Gillespie (CLE)
- (Turks and Caicos Islands) Gavin Glinton (CAR)
- (Argentina) Christian Gómez (DC)
- (Belarus) Andrei Gotsmanov (402)
- (United States) Andrew Gregor (ROC)
- (United States) Ty Harden (ROC)
- (United States) Jeff Harwell (AUS)
- (United States) David Hayes (POR)
- (United States) Ryan Heins (ROC)
- (Canada) Tyler Hemming (CHA)
- (United States) Philip Hufstader (WIL)
- (United States) Trevor Hurst (SON)
- (United States) Andrew Jacobson (DC)
- (England) Eddie Johnson (AUS)
- (United States) George Josten (POR)
- (United States) Tim Karalexis (WIL)
- (United States) Skelly Kellar (ARI)
- (United States) Michael Kraus (KC)
- (United States) Neil Krause (WM)

1 goal (continued)

- (United States) Eric Lafon (SON)
- (United States) Jeff Larentowicz (NE)
- (United States) Eric Larson (SON)
- (United States) Jesse Marsch (CHV)
- (United States) Rauwshan McKenzie (KC)
- (United States) Jason McLaughlin (POR)
- (United States) Ryan McMahen (AUS)
- (Haiti) Pascal Milien (CHI)
- (Colombia) Fredy Montero (SEA)
- (Mexico) Gerardo Moreira (EP)
- (Bolivia) Jaime Moreno (DC)
- (United States) Rodrigo Morín (EP)
- (United States) Ciaran O'Brien (AUS)
- (Kenya) Mo Oduor (HAR)
- (New Zealand) Duncan Oughton (CLB)
- (United States) Daniel Paladini (CAR)
- (Haiti) Ricardo Pierre-Louis (CLE)
- (United States) Brian Plotkin (CAR)
- (United States) David Ponce (ORC)
- (United States) Jon Ports (REA)
- (United States) Tony Schmitz (402)
- (Colombia) Diego Serna (MIA)
- (United States) Chad Severs (HAR)
- (South Africa) Ty Shipalane (HAR)
- (United States) Clyde Simms (DC)
- (Democratic Republic of the Congo) Ange N'Silu (DC)
- (United States) Kevin Stoll (ORC)
- (United States) Abe Thompson (KC)
- (Cape Verde) Zico Viega (EI)
- (United States) Jay Willis (WM)
- (United States) Kyle Zenoni (MIL)
