= Detroit United =

Detroit United FC
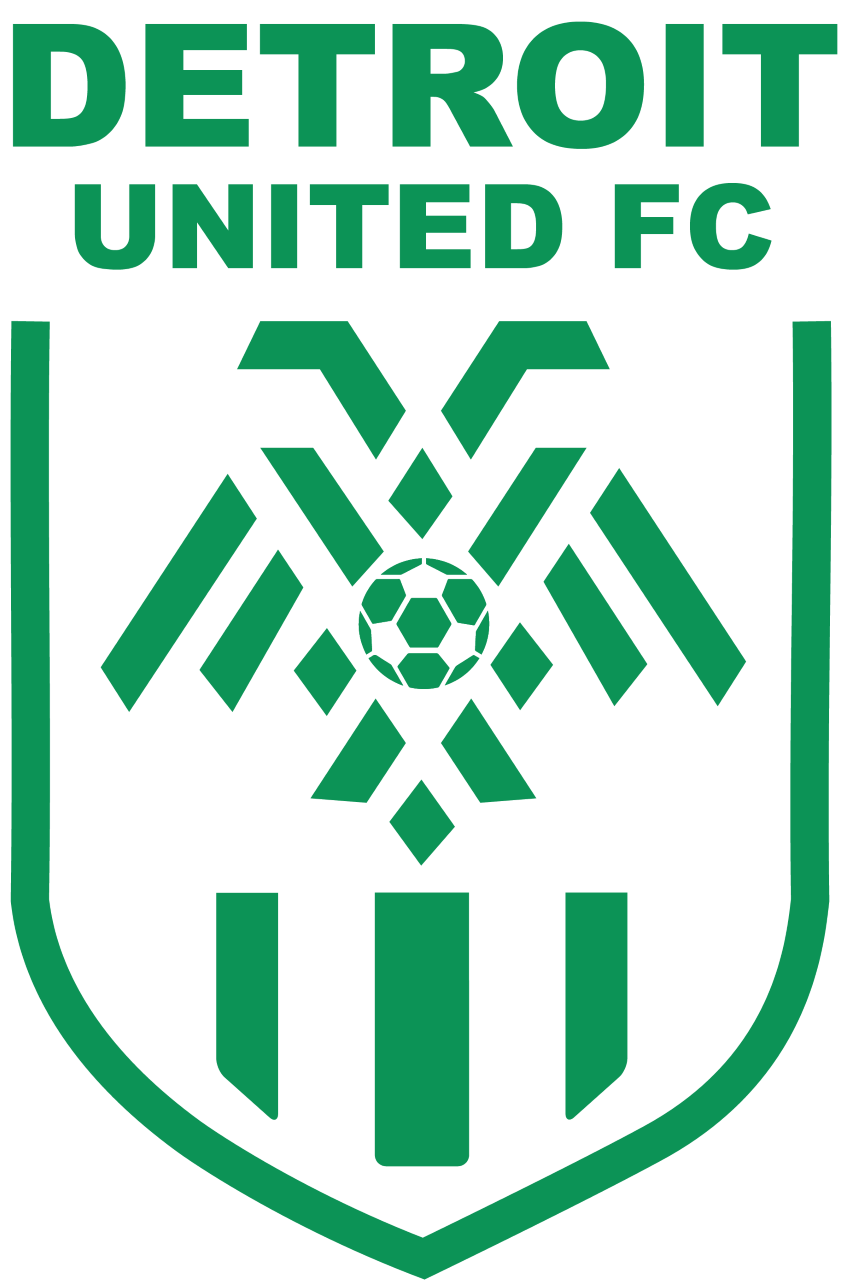
- Full name: Detroit United FC
- Founded: 2002
- Ground: Hurley Field; Farmington Hills, Michigan
- Capacity: 2,000
- Owner: Beni Tetaj
- Head coach: Beni Tetaj
- League: United Premier Soccer League (UPSL), Midwest East
Home colors	Away colors

Detroit United FC is an American amateur soccer team based in the Detroit–Metro area of Michigan, United States. Founded in 2002, the club now fields a team in the United Premier Soccer League (UPSL), competing in the Midwest East (Premier) division. Although once part of Region II of the United States Adult Soccer Association (USASA) via the MPSL, Detroit United made a formal move into the UPSL in 2020. The club’s ownership is now listed as Beni Tetaj, who also serves as head coach.

The team’s home venue has changed over time. While they previously played at Bicentennial Park in Livonia, Michigan, their current home matches are held at Hurley Field in Farmington Hills.

== History ==
Detroit United FC was founded in 2002 by George Juncaj, a former semi-professional soccer player from Montenegro, and originally competed in the Michigan Premier Soccer League (MPSL), part of the United States Adult Soccer Association Region II. The club finished second in the MPSL Premier Division in 2006, third in 2007, and second again in 2008. The team played its home matches at Bicentennial Park in Livonia during this period.

United entered the Lamar Hunt U.S. Open Cup for the first time in 2007, losing to RWB Adria in the regional qualification semi-finals. The club achieved its major breakthrough in 2010, defeating Nebraska side 402 FC on penalties in the final round of USASA Region II qualifying, which secured their first appearance in the tournament proper. United were drawn against the Pittsburgh Riverhounds of the USL Second Division and were defeated 2–0 in the first round.

The club continued in the USASA system into the early 2010s, including another strong Michigan Open Cup campaign in 2011, before later re-emerging in national amateur and semi-professional circuits. By the late 2010s and early 2020s, Detroit United transitioned into the United Premier Soccer League, joining the UPSL Midwest East Conference. During this shift, the club relocated matches to newer facilities, including the Total Sports Complex in Wixom and later Hurley Field. Leadership also evolved, with Beni Tetaj taking on ownership and operational roles as the club moved into the UPSL.

== Head coaches ==
- (Kosovo) Nikolle Oroshi (2020–present)
- (Montenegro) George Juncaj (2005–2019)

== Stadia ==
- Bicentennial Park; Livonia, Michigan (????–c.2019)
- Hurley Field; Farmington Hills, Michigan (2020–present)
- Total Sports Complex; Wixom, Michigan (2020, temporary UPSL home games)
