= 2007 U.S. Open Cup =

2007 Lamar Hunt U.S. Open Cup
Tournament details
- Country: United States

Final positions
- Champions: New England Revolution (1st title)
- Runners-up: FC Dallas
- 2008–09 CONCACAF Champions League: New England Revolution

Tournament statistics
- Top goal scorer(s): Sébastien Le Toux (5 goals)

The 2007 Lamar Hunt U.S. Open Cup was the 94th edition of the USSF's annual national soccer championship, running from June through early October.

The New England Revolution defeated FC Dallas 3–2 in the final played at Pizza Hut Park, Frisco, Texas.

Pairings for the competition were announced on Tuesday, May 29, 2007. The 2007 tournament was the first since 2002 to not include all Major League Soccer teams. Instead, MLS had eight teams in the tournament; six qualified automatically, while the remaining six US-based sides participated in a playoff for the final two positions. In another change for the tournament, all nine US-based USL First Division teams entered into the Cup. The Puerto Rico Islanders are not eligible for the tournament, as Puerto Rico has a soccer federation independent from US Soccer.

== Matchdays ==
Date	Round	Notes
June 12	First	All 32 lower division teams enter
June 26	Second	
July 10	Third	8 MLS teams enter
Aug. 7	Quarterfinals	
Sept. 4	Semifinals	
Oct. 2	Final	

== Participating teams ==
The tournament consists of 40 teams, according to the following distribution:

Classification	Number of Teams
Major League Soccer	8
United Soccer Leagues First Division	9
United Soccer Leagues Second Division	7
Amateur	16*

*Includes 8 USL Premier Development League teams and 8 USASA regional qualifiers

== Prize money ==
There is a total of $180,000 in prize money at stake in the 2007 version of the competition. The prize money breakdown is as follows: $100,000 to the champion, $50,000 to the runner up and $10,000 to the team advancing the deepest in the tournament from each of the Division II, Division III and amateur levels.

== Qualified teams by classification ==
=== Tier 1: Major League Soccer (MLS) ===
- Chicago Fire
- Chivas USA
- Colorado Rapids
- D.C. United
- FC Dallas
- Houston Dynamo
- Los Angeles Galaxy
- New England Revolution

=== Tier 2: USL First Division (USL-1) ===
- Atlanta Silverbacks
- California Victory
- Carolina RailHawks
- Charleston Battery
- Miami FC
- Minnesota Thunder
- Portland Timbers
- Rochester Raging Rhinos
- Seattle Sounders

=== Tier 3: USL Second Division (USL-2) ===
- Charlotte Eagles
- Cincinnati Kings
- Cleveland City Stars
- Crystal Palace Baltimore
- Harrisburg City Islanders
- Richmond Kickers
- Western Mass Pioneers

=== Tier 4: Premier Development League (PDL) ===
- Bakersfield Brigade
- BYU Cougars
- Central Florida Kraze
- El Paso Patriots
- Kansas City Brass
- Long Island Rough Riders
- Michigan Bucks
- Ocean City Barons

=== Tier 5: United States Adult Soccer Association (USASA) ===
- Aegean Hawks (Va.)
- Azzurri FC (Tex.)
- Banat Arsenal (Ariz.)
- Danbury United (Conn.)
- Indios USA (Tex./NPSL)
- Lynch's Irish Pub FC (Fla.)
- Milwaukee Bavarians (Wisc./NPSL)
- RWB Adria (Ill.)

== Open Cup bracket ==
Second Round winners advance to play one of 8 MLS clubs in 16-team knockout tournament
Home teams listed on top of bracket

First Round; June 12
USL-1	Seattle Sounders	4
USASA	Banat Arsenal	1
PDL	Bakersfield Brigade	0
USL-1	Portland Timbers	2

Second Round; June 26
USL-1	Seattle Sounders	2
USL-1	Portland Timbers	1

First Round; June 12
USL-1	Minnesota Thunder	3
USASA	Indios USA	2
PDL	BYU Cougars	1
USL-1	California Victory	2

Second Round; June 26
USL-1	Minnesota Thunder	0
USL-1	California Victory (AET)	1

First Round; June 12
USL-1	Charleston Battery	3
PDL	Central Florida Kraze	0
PDL	El Paso Patriots (AET/PSO)	2 (4)
USL-1	Miami FC	2 (3)

Second Round; June 26
USL-1	Charleston Battery	1
PDL	El Paso Patriots	0

First Round; June 12/13
USL-1	Atlanta Silverbacks	10
USASA	Azzurri FC	0
USL-2	Charlotte Eagles	2
USASA	Lynch's Irish Pub FC	0

Second Round; June 26
USL-1	Atlanta Silverbacks	1
USL-2	Charlotte Eagles	0

First Round; June 12
USL-1	Rochester Raging Rhinos	1
PDL	Long Island Rough Riders	0
USASA	Danbury United	2
USL-2	Western Mass Pioneers (AET)	3

Second Round; June 26
USL-1	Rochester Raging Rhinos (AET)	2
USL-2	Western Mass Pioneers	1

First Round; June 12
PDL	Ocean City Barons	1
USL-2	Crystal Palace Baltimore	0
USL-2	Harrisburg City Islanders	4
USASA	Aegean Hawks	0

Second Round; June 26
PDL	Ocean City Barons	1
USL-2	Harrisburg City Islanders	2

First Round; June 12
USL-1	Carolina RailHawks	4
USASA	RWB Adria	1
USASA	Milwaukee Bavarians	1
USL-2	Cincinnati Kings	0

Second Round; June 26
USL-1	Carolina RailHawks	4
USASA	Milwaukee Bavarians	0

First Round; June 12
USL-2	Richmond Kickers	4
PDL	Michigan Bucks	2
PDL	Kansas City Brass	0
USL-2	Cleveland City Stars	4

Second Round; June 26
USL-2	Richmond Kickers	2
USL-2	Cleveland City Stars	1

Third Round; July 9 – 18
USL-1	Seattle Sounders	3
MLS	Chivas USA	1
MLS	Colorado Rapids	3
USL-1	California Victory	1
USL-1	Charleston Battery (AET)	1
MLS	Houston Dynamo	0
MLS	FC Dallas (AET/PSO)	1 (4)
USL-1	Atlanta Silverbacks	1 (3)
USL-1	Rochester Raging Rhinos	2
MLS	New England Revolution	4
USL-2	Harrisburg City Islanders	1
MLS	D.C. United	0
USL-1	Carolina RailHawks	1
MLS	Chicago Fire	0
USL-2	Richmond Kickers	1
MLS	Los Angeles Galaxy	0

Quarterfinals; August 7 – 8
USL-1	Seattle Sounders	5
MLS	Colorado Rapids	0
USL-1	Charleston Battery	1
MLS	FC Dallas (AET)	2
MLS	New England Revolution	2
USL-2	Harrisburg City Islanders	1
USL-1	Carolina RailHawks	1
USL-2	Richmond Kickers	0

Semifinals; September 4
USL-1	Seattle Sounders	1
MLS	FC Dallas (AET)	2
MLS	New England Revolution (AET)	2
USL-1	Carolina RailHawks	1

Final; October 3
MLS	FC Dallas	2
MLS	New England Revolution	3

== Schedule ==
Note: Scorelines use the standard U.S. convention of placing the home team on the right-hand side of box scores.

=== First round ===
June 12, 2007	Western Mass Pioneers (USL-2)	3–2 (a.e.t.)	Danbury United (USASA)	Danbury, CT
5:15 ET	Maciel 59' (pen.); Deren 105' (pen.); Wilson 109'	(Report)	Costa 86'; Santos 92'	Stadium: Portuguese Cultural Center; Referee: Kenneth Etheridge (USA)

June 12, 2007	Michigan Bucks (PDL)	2–4	Richmond Kickers (USL-2)	Richmond, VA
7:00 ET	Uzoigwe (yellow card) 62'; Djokic 73' 76'; Holody (yellow card) 80'	(Report)	Ssejjemba 7'; McEachron 36'; Gorres 70'; Dotsenko (yellow card) 85'; Watson 86'	Stadium: University of Richmond Stadium; Attendance: 522; Referee: Shaun Papperman (USA)

June 12, 2007	Aegean Hawks (USASA)	0–4	Harrisburg City Islanders (USL-2)	Harrisburg, PA
7:05 ET	Bodiya (yellow card) 19'	(Report)	Morman (yellow card) 28'; Clay 56'; Velten (yellow card) 64'; Pierce (yellow card) 67'; Oduor 68'; Schofield 69'; Fisher 87'	Stadium: Skyline Sports Complex; Attendance: 874; Referee: Daun White (USA)

June 12, 2007	Crystal Palace Baltimore (USL-2)	0–1	Ocean City Barons (PDL)	Ocean City, NJ
7:30 ET	Urquijo (red card) 22'; Flores (red card) 90+'	(Report) Report 2	Carmichael 45'	Stadium: Carey Stadium; Attendance: 307; Referee: Mark Geiger (USA)

June 12, 2007	RWB Adria (USASA)	1–4	Carolina RailHawks (USL-1)	Cary, NC
7:30 ET	Carrillo 76'; Alebic (red card) 89'	(Report)	Worthen 5'; Edozien 31' 34'; Norkus 64'	Stadium: SAS Soccer Park; Attendance: 3,062; Referee: Mark Kadlecik (USA)

June 12, 2007	Central Florida Kraze (PDL)	0–3	Charleston Battery (USL-1)	Charleston, SC
7:30 ET	Fadida (red card) 76'	(Report)	Armstrong 5'; Vercollone 12' 42'	Stadium: Blackbaud Stadium; Attendance: 1,800; Referee: Shane Moody (USA)

June 12, 2007	Long Island Rough Riders (PDL)	0–1	Rochester Raging Rhinos (USL-1)	Rochester, NY
7:35 ET		(Report)	Matthew Delicâte 20'	Stadium: PAETEC Park; Attendance: 3,712; Referee: Jason Krnac (USA)

June 12, 2007	Azzurri FC (USASA)	0–10	Atlanta Silverbacks (USL-1)	Chamblee, Georgia
7:55 ET		(Report)	Dayton O'Brien 10'; Rodrigo Rios 14', 25', 90'; Rafique Hassim 19', 74'; Dan Antoniuk 80'; Warren Ukah 84', 86', 88'	Stadium: Silverbacks Park; Attendance: – Referee: Tony Russo (USA)

June 12, 2007	Indios USA (NPSL)	2–3	Minnesota Thunder (USL-1)	St. Paul, Minnesota
8:05 ET	Marco Vidal 5'; Joel Rios 77'	(Report)	Jeremiah Bass 37'; Darren Spicer 40'; Leo Gibson 66'	Stadium: James Griffin Stadium; Attendance: 1,132; Referee: Troy Cohrs (USA)

June 12, 2007	Cleveland City Stars (USL-2)	4–0	Kansas City Brass (PDL)	Liberty, Missouri
8:30 ET	Ian Leibbrant 19', 81'; Adam Moffat 34'; Nigel Codrington 63'	(Report)		Stadium: William Jewell College; Attendance: -- Referee: Younasse Tarbouni (USA)

June 12, 2007	Cincinnati Kings (USL-2)	0–1	Milwaukee Bavarians (NPSL)	Milwaukee, Wisconsin
8:30 ET		(Report)	Steve Sperl 10'	Stadium: Bavarian Soccer Park; Attendance: -- Referee: Pawel Wydra (USA)

June 12, 2007	Miami FC (USL-1)	2–2 (a.e.t.)	El Paso Patriots (PDL)	El Paso, Texas
9:30 ET	Zinho 70'; Sean Fraser 78'	(Report)	Michael Griego 21'; Omar Mora 89'	Stadium: Patriot Stadium; Attendance: -- Referee: Jeremy Vehar (USA)

June 12, 2007	California Victory (USL-1)	2–1	BYU Cougars (PDL)	Provo, Utah
9:30 ET	Raul Palomares 23'; Yuri Morales 65'	(Report)	Daniel McKinley 89'	Stadium: South Stadium; Attendance: -- Referee: Tyler Ploeger (USA)

June 12, 2007	Portland Timbers (USL-1)	2–0	Bakersfield Brigade (PDL)	Bakersfield, California
10:30 ET	Lawrence Olum 4'; Luc Harrington 18'	(Report)		Stadium: Bakersfield Christian HS; Attendance: -- Referee: Miguel Chicas (USA)

June 12, 2007	Banat Arsenal (USASA)	1–4	Seattle Sounders (USL-1)	Tukwila, Washington
11:00 ET	Hughes 18'	(Report)	Nathan Knox 9'; Sébastien Le Toux 32', 37'; Greg Howes 45'	Stadium: Starfire Sports Complex; Attendance: -- Referee: Mike Rottersman (USA)

June 13, 2007	Lynch's Irish Pub FC (USASA)	0–2	Charlotte Eagles (USL-2)	Charlotte, North Carolina
7:30 ET		(Report)	Dustin Swinehart 21'; Jacob Coggins 84'	Stadium: Transamerica Field; Attendance: -- Referee: Daniel Burak (USA)

=== Second round ===
June 26, 2007	Cleveland City Stars (USL-2)	1–2	Richmond Kickers (USL-2)	Richmond, Virginia
7:00 ET	Nigel Codrington 64'	(Report)	Matt Watson 28'; Robert Ssejjemba 45'+	Stadium: University of Richmond Stadium; Attendance: 1,107; Referee: Robert Velbis (USA)

June 26, 2007	Harrisburg City Islanders (USL-2)	2–1	Ocean City Barons (PDL)	Ocean City, New Jersey
7:30 ET	Chad Severs 44'; David Schofield 48'	(Report)	Leon Brown 42'	Stadium: Carey Stadium; Attendance: 1,019; Referee: Hossam Saad (USA)

June 26, 2007	Milwaukee Bavarians (NPSL)	0–4	Carolina RailHawks (USL-1)	Cary, North Carolina
7:30 ET		(Report)	Connally Edozien 37'; Anthony Maher 45', 56'; Marcio Leite 79'	Stadium: SAS Soccer Park; Attendance: 3,000 + Referee: Charles Mitchell (USA)

June 26, 2007	El Paso Patriots (PDL)	0–1	Charleston Battery (USL-1)	Charleston, South Carolina
7:30 ET		(Report)	Anthony Catalano 74'	Stadium: Blackbaud Stadium; Attendance: -- Referee: Roni Canales (USA)

June 26, 2007	Western Mass Pioneers (USL-2)	1–2 (a.e.t.)	Rochester Raging Rhinos (USL-1)	Rochester, New York
7:35 ET	Omar McFarlane 43'	(Report)	Matthew Delicâte 83'; Aaran Lines 105'	Stadium: PAETEC Park; Attendance: 3,125; Referee: Rizal Milliken (USA)

June 26, 2007	Charlotte Eagles (USL-2)	0–1	Atlanta Silverbacks (USL-1)	Atlanta, Georgia
7:55 ET		(Report)	Warren Ukah 49'	Stadium: Silverbacks Park; Attendance: -- Referee: William Cleland (USA)

June 26, 2007	California Victory (USL-1)	1–0 (a.e.t.)	Minnesota Thunder (USL-1)	St. Paul, Minnesota
8:05 ET	Ricardo Sanchez 95'	(Report)		Stadium: James Griffin Stadium; Attendance: 1,258; Referee: Edvin Jurisevic (USA)

June 26, 2007	Portland Timbers (USL-1)	1–2	Seattle Sounders (USL-1)	Tukwila, Washington
10:00 ET	Justin Thompson 19'; Cameron Knowles (red card) 40'	(Report)	Hugo Alcaraz-Cuellar 41' (pen.); Jacob Besagno 70'	Stadium: Starfire Sports Complex; Attendance: 711; Referee: Hidajet Tica (USA)

=== Third round ===
July 9, 2007	Atlanta Silverbacks (USL-1)	1–1 (a.e.t.) (3–4 p)	FC Dallas (MLS)	Frisco, Texas
8:30 ET	Dan Antoniuk 78'	(Report)	Carlos Ruiz 74'	Stadium: Pizza Hut Park; Attendance: 2,510; Referee: Colin Tait (USA)
	Penalties
	Rodrigo Rios scored Justin Moore saved Dayton O'Brien missed Angel Rivillo scored David Hayes scored Scott Buete missed		Carlos Ruiz scored Pablo Ricchetti saved Juan Carlos Toja saved Chris Gbandi scored Abe Thompson scored Arturo Alvarez scored

July 10, 2007	Los Angeles Galaxy (MLS)	0–1	Richmond Kickers (USL-2)	Richmond, Virginia
7:00 ET		(Report)	David Bulow 31'	Stadium: University of Richmond Stadium; Attendance: 4,578; Referee: Andrew Chapin (USA)

July 10, 2007	Houston Dynamo (MLS)	0–1 (a.e.t.)	Charleston Battery (USL-1)	Charleston, South Carolina
7:30 ET		(Report)	Stephen Armstrong 108'	Stadium: Blackbaud Stadium; Attendance: 2,569; Referee: Shane Moody (USA)

July 10, 2007	New England Revolution (MLS)	4–2	Rochester Raging Rhinos (USL-1)	Rochester, New York
7:35 ET	Steve Ralston 19', 94'+ (pen); Taylor Twellman 67', 90'	(Report)	Hamed Diallo 76', 85'	Stadium: PAETEC Park; Attendance: 8,551; Referee: Richard Sanchez (USA)

July 10, 2007	California Victory (USL-1)	1–3	Colorado Rapids (MLS)	Commerce City, Colorado
9:00 ET	Juan Epitié 79'	(Report)	José Cancela 22'; Herculez Gomez 50'; Omar Cummings 89'	Stadium: Dick's Sporting Goods Park; Attendance: -- Referee: Ramon Hernandez (USA)

July 11, 2007	D.C. United (MLS)	0–1	Harrisburg City Islanders (USL-2)	Landisville, Pennsylvania
7:30 ET		(Report)	Steve Fisher 44'	Stadium: Hempfield High School; Attendance: 5,219; Referee: Jeff Gonerik (USA)

July 15, 2007	Chicago Fire (MLS)	0–1	Carolina RailHawks (USL-1)	Cary, North Carolina
7:30 ET		(Report)	McColm Cephas 56'	Stadium: SAS Soccer Park; Attendance: 4,485; Referee: Roni Canales (USA)

July 18, 2007	Chivas USA (MLS)	1–3	Seattle Sounders (USL-1)	Seattle, Washington
10:30 ET	Laurent Merlin 16'	(Report)	Sébastien Le Toux 44', 50'; Roger Levesque 81'	Stadium: Qwest Field; Attendance: 3,589; Referee: Richard Heron (USA)

=== Quarterfinals ===
August 7, 2007	Richmond Kickers (USL-2)	0–1	Carolina RailHawks (USL-1)	Cary, North Carolina
7:30 ET		(Report)	Connally Edozien 64'	Stadium: SAS Soccer Park; Attendance: 2,900 + Referee: Alex Prus (USA)

August 7, 2007	FC Dallas (MLS)	2–1 (a.e.t.)	Charleston Battery (USL-1)	Charleston, South Carolina
7:30 ET	Clarence Goodson 22'; Arturo Alvarez 95'	(Report)	Stephen Armstrong 17'	Stadium: Blackbaud Stadium; Attendance: 3,262; Referee: Hilario Grajeda (USA)

August 7, 2007	Colorado Rapids (MLS)	0–5	Seattle Sounders (USL-1)	Seattle, Washington
10:00 ET		(Report)	Taylor Graham 23'; Zach Scott 25'; Ugo Ihemelu og 41'; Josh Gardner 56'; Sébastien Le Toux 68'	Stadium: Qwest Field; Attendance: 6,619; Referee: Ricardo Salazar (USA)

August 8, 2007	Harrisburg City Islanders (USL-2)	1–2	New England Revolution (MLS)	Foxborough, Massachusetts
7:30 ET	Matt Tanzini 78'	(Report)	Andy Dorman 4'; Taylor Twellman 17'	Stadium: Gillette Stadium; Attendance: 1,512; Referee: Richard Heron (USA)

=== Semifinals ===
September 4, 2007	Carolina RailHawks (USL-1)	1–2 (a.e.t.)	New England Revolution (MLS)	New Britain, Connecticut
7:00 ET	Anthony Maher 6'	(Report)	Jeff Larentowicz 47'+ Pat Noonan 94'	Stadium: Veteran's Stadium; Attendance: 4,203; Referee: Shane Moody (USA)

September 4, 2007	FC Dallas (MLS)	2–1 (a.e.t.)	Seattle Sounders (USL-1)	Seattle, Washington
10:00 ET	Carlos Ruiz 92'; Abe Thompson 119'(pen)	(Report)	Leighton O'Brien 120'+	Stadium: Qwest Field; Attendance: 10,385; Referee: Abiodun Okulaja (USA)

=== Final ===
October 3, 2007
8:00 EDT

New England Revolution (MLS)	3–2	FC Dallas (MLS)
Pat Noonan 21'; Taylor Twellman 41'; Wells Thompson 57'		Arturo Alvarez 30'; Abe Thompson 64'

Pizza Hut Park, Frisco, Texas
Attendance: 10,618
Referee: Alex Prus (USA)

New England Revolution	FC Dallas

== Top scorers ==
Position	Player	Club	Goals
1	Sébastien Le Toux	Seattle Sounders	5
2	Taylor Twellman	New England Revolution	4
	Warren Ukah	Atlanta Silverbacks	4
	Connally Edozien	Carolina Railhawks	4

== Notes ==
- Charlotte v. Lynch's Irish Pub was postponed after delayed and cancelled flights prevented Lynch's Irish Pub from arriving in North Carolina on time. The game was pushed back one day.
- Top goal scorers

== See also ==
- 2007 U.S. Open Cup qualification
- United States Soccer Federation
- Lamar Hunt U.S. Open Cup
- Major League Soccer
- United Soccer Leagues
- USASA
- National Premier Soccer League
- 2007 National Amateur Cup
