= Lynch's Irish Pub F.C. =

- Full name: Lynch's Irish Pub Football Club
- Nicknames: Lynch's, LIP
- Founded: 1999
- Ground: Patton Park; Jacksonville, Florida
- Capacity: ????
- Head Coach: (United States) Roberto Apunte
- League: Beaches Adult Soccer League; USASA
Home colors	Away colors

Lynch's Irish Pub F.C. (usually known by the shortened name, Lynch's F.C.) is an American amateur soccer team based in Jacksonville, Florida, United States. Founded in 1999, the team plays in the Beaches Adult Soccer League, part of Region III of the United States Adult Soccer Association.

The team plays its home games at Patton Park. The team's colors are green and white.

== History ==
The team was founded in 1999 by soccer fans who frequented Lynch's Irish Pub in Jacksonville Beach, Florida. They were known as D. S. United until 2004, when the owners changed the name to Lynch's Irish Pub F.C. to reflect their history and their sponsorship arrangement with the pub. Lynch's played in the Beaches Adult Soccer League, a member of the United States Adult Soccer Association Region III group of leagues. In 2014 Beaches Adult Soccer League became a member of USSSA.

Lynch's has a distinguished history in the Lamar Hunt U.S. Open Cup, having qualified for the final stages of the tournament three times. As D. S. United, they qualified for their first Cup in 2003, but lost 4–1 in the first round to Raleigh CASL Elite of the USL Premier Development League. The newly monickered Lynch's qualified for the cup the a second time in 2007, topping their regional qualification group containing Dallas Roma and Saturn FC in the final round of tournament, before losing 2–0 to the Charlotte Eagles in the first round of the tournament proper.

Lynch's qualified for the final stages of the cup again in 2009, topping their regional qualifying group (that included Pumas FC, Baton Rouge Classics and Greenwood Wanderers), before losing 2–1 in the first round to USL First Division side Miami FC. Lynch's goal against Miami was scored by Tommy Krizanovic.

== Players ==
=== 2009 USOC roster ===
Note: Flags indicate national team as defined under FIFA eligibility rules; some limited exceptions apply. Players may hold more than one non-FIFA nationality.

No.	Pos.	Nation	Player
—	MF	TRI	Mikhail Awai
—	DF	USA	Steve Command
—	FW	USA	Hollis Donaldson
—	MF	USA	Patrick Gambone
—	DF	USA	Jacobi Goodfellow
—	MF	USA	Jonathan Jackson
—	DF	USA	Tony Kattreh
—	FW	CRO	Tommy Krizanovic
—	MF	USA	Wale Leyimu

No.	Pos.	Nation	Player
—	FW	USA	Jay Mainville
—	MF	USA	Rammy Nikansae
—	MF	USA	Mark Rowland
—	GK	USA	Joe Sanchez
—	MF	USA	Dominic Schell
—	DF	USA	Thomas Senecal
—	FW	USA	Tony Taylor
—	GK	USA	Greg Williams

== Year-by-year ==
Year	Division	League	Regular season	Playoffs	Open Cup
2003	5	USASA			First Round
2007	5	USASA			First Round
2009	5	USASA			First Round
2010	5	USASA			Did not qualify

== Head coaches ==
- (Ecuador) Roberto Apunte (2007-2014)
- (United States) Moses Williams (2009)
- (United States) Patrick Cannon (2010–present)

== Stadia ==
- Patton Park; Jacksonville, Florida (2007–present)
