= 402 FC =

American football club

- Full name: 402 Football Club
- Founded: 2008
- Ground: Morrison Stadium; Omaha, Nebraska
- Capacity: 6,000
- Owner: (United States) Jason Mims
- Head Coach: (United States) Jason Mims
- League: USASA
Home colors	Away colors

402 FC was an American amateur soccer team based in Omaha, Nebraska, United States. Founded in 2008, the team played in Region II of the United States Adult Soccer Association, a network of amateur leagues at the fifth tier of the American Soccer Pyramid.

They played its home games at Morrison Stadium on the campus of Creighton University. The team's colors were blue and white.

== History ==
402 FC was formed in 2008 by Jason Mims, a former Saint Louis University player and current assistant soccer coach for Creighton University, to provide a way for young soccer players from Nebraska to compete in high-level nationwide competition. The team is named after Eastern Nebraska's telephone area code.

402 qualified for the final stages of the 2009 Lamar Hunt U.S. Open Cup at the first attempt, by beating the Minnesota Hawks and RWB Adria in their regional qualification tournament, and in doing so became the first team from Nebraska ever to appear in the main draw of the US Open Cup. They lost 3–2 in the first round to USL First Division side Minnesota Thunder. 402's goals in the Thunder game were scored by Andrei Gotsmanov and Tony Schmitz.

The team played in the qualifying tournament for the 2010 Lamar Hunt U.S. Open Cup, and beat St. Paul Twin Stars of the National Premier Soccer League in the first game, but were knocked out at the final qualifying stage, 4–2 on penalties, by Detroit United.

== Players ==
=== 2009 USOC roster ===
Note: Flags indicate national team as defined under FIFA eligibility rules; some limited exceptions apply. Players may hold more than one non-FIFA nationality.

No.	Pos.	Nation	Player
—	MF	USA	Adam Banister
—	MF	USA	Tim Bohnenkamp
—	DF	USA	Chris Brunt
—	MF	BLR	Andrei Gotsmanov
—	DF	USA	Ryan Junge
—	GK	USA	Ross Kaufan
—	DF	USA	Jason Mims
—	FW	PER	Joshua Moran
—	GK	USA	Daniel Padilla

No.	Pos.	Nation	Player
—	MF	USA	Jace Peters
—	FW	USA	Tony Schmitz
—	FW	USA	Alex Stica
—	DF	USA	Matt Thomas
—	FW	COL	Johnny Torres
—	DF	USA	Matt Wadleigh
—	MF	USA	Tim Walters
—	DF	USA	Andrew Watts
—	FW	USA	Damien Westfield

== Year-by-year ==
Year	Division	League	Regular season	Playoffs	Open Cup
2009		USASA			First Round
2010		USASA			Did not qualify
2011		USASA			Did not qualify

== Head coaches ==
- (United States) Jason Mims (2008–present)

== Stadia ==
- Morrison Stadium at Creighton University; Omaha, Nebraska (2008–present)
