= Saturn FC =

- Full name: Saturn Futbol Club
- Founded: 2009
- 2009: Regular Season: 5th, Southeast; Playoffs: did not qualify
Home colors	Away colors

Saturn FC was an American soccer team based in Marietta, Georgia, United States. Founded in 2009, the team plays in National Premier Soccer League a national amateur league at the fourth tier of the American Soccer Pyramid, in the Southeast Division.

The team is defunct, and played in 2009.
