= Dallas Roma F.C. =

- Full name: Dallas Roma Football Club
- Founded: 2000
- League: NTPSA Division 1A (Tier 5)
Home colors	Away colors

Dallas Roma F.C. is an American amateur soccer club based in Dallas, Texas, consisting of Men's, Woman's, Youth, and Coed Teams. Established in 2000, The Roma men's team last played in 2011 in the North Texas Premier Soccer Association, a United States Adult Soccer Association-affiliated league, that represents the fifth tier of the American soccer pyramid. The Roma youth teams currently play in the prestigious Classic League, a competitive playing league sponsored by the Chamber Classic Soccer Alliance, Inc. (“Alliance” or “CCSAI”), which is affiliated with and sanctioned by the North Texas State Soccer Association.

The club is best known for their run in the 2006 U.S. Open Cup, a knock-out tournament open to all tiers of the American soccer pyramid, where they reached the fourth round.

== 2006 Lamar Hunt U.S. Open Cup ==
The club earned national fame in 2006 when it became the first amateur (non MLS or USL) club to defeat teams from the top two divisions (Major League Soccer and USL First Division) in the Lamar Hunt U.S. Open Cup since the MLS era started. Roma beat USL team Miami FC (and former FIFA World Cup winner Romário) 1-0 in the second round. In the third round, Roma tied MLS side Chivas USA (whose lineup included both American and Mexican internationals) 0-0 and won 4-2 on penalty kicks. Roma again traveled to Los Angeles for the fourth round, falling 2-0 to the defending MLS Cup champions, Los Angeles Galaxy.

== 2014 Youth Soccer Club ==
In June 2014, the Dallas Roma F.C. brand was expanded to include a Youth division in order to focus on the development of youth soccer in North Texas. The club's mission is to offer a world-style soccer club to players of all socio-economic backgrounds that provides them with a direct path to play at the highest level of soccer possible. The club currently conducts its training sessions at a privately owned facility located in east Plano, Texas. The club's official website is located at http://www.dallasromafc.com.

== See also ==
- USASA
- 2006 Lamar Hunt U.S. Open Cup
