= Pumas FC =

- Full name: Pumas FC
- Founded: 1999
- Owner: (Mexico) Juan Esparza
- Head Coach: (Mexico) Juan Esparza
- League: National Premier Soccer League
- 4th, Southeast; Playoffs: DNQ
Home colors	Away colors

Pumas FC was an American soccer team based in Birmingham, Alabama, United States. Founded in 1999, the team played in the National Premier Soccer League (NPSL), a national amateur league at the fourth tier of the American Soccer Pyramid, in the Southeast Division.

The team played its home games on the soccer field at the campus of the University of Alabama at Birmingham, where they had played since 2009. The team's colors were gold, blue, and white.

As of February 2011 the team was no longer listed on the NPSL website and its own website was not available.

== Players ==
=== 2009 Roster ===
Note: Flags indicate national team as defined under FIFA eligibility rules; some limited exceptions apply. Players may hold more than one non-FIFA nationality.

No.	Pos.	Nation	Player
—		USA	Luis Alvarez
—		USA	Neftali Arenas
—		USA	Edgar Avalos
—		USA	Frank Brown
—		USA	Jose De Los Santos
—		USA	Trey Gregory
—		MEX	David Lopez
—		USA	Johnny Markey
—		USA	Eduardo Martinez
—		USA	Luis Montejano
—		BRA	Lucas Manzoli
—		USA	Isaac Moralez

No.	Pos.	Nation	Player
—		USA	Michal Mravic
—		USA	Jesus Orellana
—		USA	Luis Quainoo
—		CAN	Derek Rios
—		CAN	Carlo Schiavoni
—		USA	Jonah Stewart
—		USA	Josh Stewart
—		USA	Ken Tabata
—		USA	Julio Uribe
—		USA	Paolo Vasquez
—		USA	Olaide Yusuf

== Year-by-year ==
Year	Division	League	Regular season	Playoffs	Open Cup
2009	4	NPSL	4th, Southeast	Did not qualify	Did not qualify
2010	4	NPSL	4th, Southeast	Did not qualify	Did not qualify

== Head coaches ==
- (Mexico) Rolando Hernandez (2009)
- (Mexico) Juan Esparza (2010–present)
