= San Diego United =

- Full name: San Diego United Futbol Club
- Founded: 2008
- Ground: Torero Stadium
- Capacity: 6,000
- Chairman: Elio Bello
- Manager: Guy Newman
- League: National Premier Soccer League
- 2009: on hiatus
| Home colors | Away colors |

San Diego United was an American soccer team based in San Diego, California, that competed in the National Premier Soccer League (NPSL), a national amateur league at the fourth tier of the American soccer pyramid. The team was founded in 2008. The team and Southwest Division went on hiatus from the NPSL for the 2009 season due to a lack of teams in the Southwest Division after the 2008 season. As of 2010, neither the Southwest Division nor SD United are listed as being part of NPSL.

The team played its home games at Torero Stadium. The team's colors were black, white, red and gold.

The team had a sister organization, also called San Diego United, in the Women's Premier Soccer League.

== Players ==
=== Current roster ===
Note: Flags indicate national team as defined under FIFA eligibility rules; some limited exceptions apply. Players may hold more than one non-FIFA nationality.

| No. | Pos. | Nation | Player |
|---|---|---|---|
| — | FW | USA | Josh Barton |
| — | MF | USA | Nick Clemens |
| — | FW | USA | Kirk Fonseca |
| — | MF | USA | Matt Horne |
| — | DF | USA | Jose Luna |
| — | MF | USA | Miguel Luna |
| — | FW | USA | Scott Martin |
| — | GK | USA | Tommy McClain |
| — | GK | USA | Zac McPheeters |
| — | DF | USA | Anthony Medina |
| — | DF | USA | Kevin Meissner |
| — | DF | USA | Mike Mercuriali |

| No. | Pos. | Nation | Player |
|---|---|---|---|
| — | MF | CAN | Imone Mohanta |
| — | MF | USA | Tyler Norby |
| — | MF | USA | Brian O'Connor |
| — | FW | USA | Erin O'Connor |
| — | DF | USA | Damien Quinn |
| — | MF | USA | Matthew Quinzi |
| — | DF | USA | Tim Roty |
| — | FW | USA | Shane Walton |
| — | DF | USA | Ian Weinberg |
| — | MF | USA | Brett Williams |
| — | FW | USA | Eric Wunderle |
| — | MF | USA | Tony Mercuriali |

=== Notable former players ===
Steve Bruce Leslie Cunningham

== Year-by-year ==
| Year | Division | League | Reg. season | Playoffs | Open Cup |
|---|---|---|---|---|---|
| 2008 | 4 | NPSL | 1st, Southwest | Divisional Round | Did not qualify |
| 2009 | 5 | USASA | stats not available | | Did not qualify |

== Honors ==
- NPSL Southwest Division Champions 2008

National Champions 2008

== Head coaches ==
- (United States) Jason Heth (2008)
- (United States) Guy Newman (2009–2010)

== Stadia ==
- Valhalla Stadium at Valhalla High School; El Cajon, California (2008)
- Torero Stadium; San Diego, California (2009–present)
- Stadium at Granite Hills High School; El Cajon, California 2 games (2009)
