= Charm City FC =

American soccer team

- Full name: Charm City FC
- Founded: 2007
- Ground: Carrol Field (Arundel High School)
- Capacity: Unknown
- Chairman: (United States) Patrick Crawford
- Manager: (United States) Jason Rims
- League: National Premier Soccer League
- 2009: Regular Season: 6th, Keystone; Playoffs: did not qualify
Home colors	Away colors

Charm City FC was an American soccer team based in Gambrills, Maryland, United States, and was founded in 2007.

The team plays its home games in the athletic stadium on the campus of Arundel High School, where they have played since 2009. The team's colors are orange, silver and white.

The team formerly played at the Harford Community College's venue in Bel Air, when they were known as Maryland United FC.

== History ==
Charm City FC began as a member of the Maryland Major Soccer League (MMSL) in 2003 under the name Allied SC. In 2007, they merged with Christos FC and became AC United, but that partnership only lasted one year. After they split, the club joined the National Premier Soccer League (NPSL), replacing Maryland United and changing their name from Allied SC to Charm City FC. They would spend two seasons in the league (2007–08), while continuing to play in the MMSL simultaneously. Before the 2009 season, they left the NPSL to focus on the Maryland state cups and the MMSL.

== Year-by-year ==
Year	Division	League	Regular season	Playoffs	Open Cup
2008	4	NPSL	3rd, Mid Atlantic	Did not qualify	Did not qualify
2009	4	NPSL	6th, Keystone	Did not qualify	Did not qualify

== Head coaches ==
- (United States) James Oman (2008)
- (United States) Jason Rims (2009–present)

== Stadia ==
- Stadium at Harford Community College; Bel Air, Maryland (2008)
- Carrol Field at Arundel High School; Gambrills, Maryland (2009–present)
- Stadium at Meade Senior High School; Fort Meade, Maryland 1 game (2009)

== Logos ==
Maryland United FC logo
