= Phoenix Banat Storm =

- Full name: Phoenix Banat Storm
- Nickname: The Storm
- Founded: 2006
- Ground: Friendship Park
- Chairman: Bruce Denewrth
- Head Coach: Jon Ruzan
- League: National Premier Soccer League
Home colors	Away colors

Phoenix Banat Storm are an American soccer team, founded in 2006, who played in the National Premier Soccer League (NPSL), the fourth tier of the American Soccer Pyramid, for just one season. The team is named after the eastern part of the Banat region in present-day Romania and Serbia.

The Storm played their home matches at Friendship Park in Avondale, Arizona, 18 miles west of downtown Phoenix. The team's colors were red and white.

The club currently plays at an amateur level in a local league as Banat Arsenal.

== Year-by-year ==
Year	Division	League	Reg. season	Playoffs	Open Cup
2006	4	NPSL	5th, Southwest	Did not qualify	Did not qualify
