= Danbury United =

- Full name: Danbury United
- Founded: 2003
- Ground: Portuguese Cultural Center; Danbury, Connecticut
- Capacity: 250
- General Manager: (Portugal) Carlos Canhao
- Head Coach: (Portugal) Mauro Costa
- League: Connecticut Soccer League; USASA
Home colors	Away colors

Danbury United is an American soccer club based in Danbury, Connecticut. The team is an arm of the Portuguese Cultural Center, a group that allows the large Portuguese-American population of Connecticut to stay in touch with their roots. The "open" team plays in the Connecticut Soccer League, the top state league in Connecticut.

The team qualified for the 2007 Lamar Hunt U.S. Open Cup and lost in the first round, but not without giving the professional Western Mass Pioneers a scare by taking them to extra time.

== 2011 USOC roster ==
Note: Flags indicate national team as defined under FIFA eligibility rules; some limited exceptions apply. Players may hold more than one non-FIFA nationality.

No.	Pos.	Nation	Player
1	GK	(Portugal) POR	André Faria
2	MF	(Portugal) POR	Mauro Costa
3	DF	(United States) USA	Matthew Cusack
4	DF	(United States) USA	Justin Dell
5	FW	(United States) USA	Zachary Dell
6	MF	(United States) USA	Steven DeMoura
7	FW	(Brazil) BRA	José dos Santos
8	MF	(Brazil) BRA	Mauro dos Santos
9	MF	(Portugal) POR	Tony Fernandes
10	MF	(United States) USA	Jeffrey Matteo
11	FW	(United States) USA	Arthur Hilaro

No.	Pos.	Nation	Player
12	DF	(Canada) CAN	John Meyer
13	MF	(United States) USA	Nick Christopher
14	MF	(United States) USA	Michael Palacio
15	DF	(United States) USA	Mark Pataky
16	MF	(Mozambique) MOZ	Alexandre Paulichi
17	MF	(Greece) GRE	Adam Mathioudis
19	MF	(Cape Verde) CPV	Herakton Silva
20	FW	(Brazil) BRA	Julio Cesar dos Santos
21	MF	(United States) USA	John Koutsounadis
22	FW	(Portugal) POR	Gerson Canhaõ
28	DF	(Portugal) POR	Philip Santos Moreira
