= 2004 PDL season =

USL Premier Development League
- Season: 2004
- Champions: Central Florida Kraze (1st Title)
- Regular Season Champions: Chicago Fire Reserves (1st Title)
- Matches: 456
- Goals: 1,963 (4.3 per match)
- Best player: (United States) Ruben Mingo South Jersey Barons
- Top goalscorer: (Mexico) Julio Frías El Paso Patriots (25 Goals)
- Best goalkeeper: (United States) Brad Guzan Chicago Fire Reserves

The 2004 USL Premier Development League season was the 10th PDL season. The season began in April 2004 and ended in August 2004.

Central Florida Kraze finished the season as national champions, beating Boulder Rapids Reserve 1–0 in the PDL Championship game. Chicago Fire Reserves finished with the best regular season record in the league, winning 17 out of their 18 games, suffering no losses, and finishing with a +66 goal difference.

El Paso Patriots striker Julio Frias was the league's top scorer, with 25 goals, while DFW Tornados midfielder Mark Rowland led the league with 11 assists. Chicago Fire Reserves keeper Brad Guzan enjoyed the best goalkeeping statistics, with a goals-against average of 0.39 per game in his 13 games.

== Changes from 2003 ==
=== Name changes ===
- Louisiana Outlaws changed their name to Lafayette Swamp Cats.
- Mid-Michigan Bucks changed their name to Michigan Bucks.
- Texas Spurs changed their name to Dallas-Fort Worth Tornados.

=== New franchises ===
- Ten teams joined the league this year, including four brand new franchises:

Team name	Metro area	Location	Previous affiliation
(Florida) Ajax Orlando Prospects	Orlando area	Orlando, Florida	expansion
(North Carolina) Carolina Dynamo	Greensboro area	Greensboro, NC	previously in Pro Select
(Ohio) Cleveland Internationals	Cleveland area	Cleveland, OH	expansion
Colorado Springs Blizzard	Colorado Springs area	Colorado Springs, CO	expansion
(Texas) El Paso Patriots	El Paso area	El Paso, TX	previously in A-League
Indiana Blast	Indianapolis area	Indianapolis, IN	previously in A-League
(Texas) Laredo Heat	Laredo area	Laredo	expansion
New Jersey Stallions	Northern New Jersey area	Wayne, NJ	previously in Pro Select
(Pennsylvania) Reading Rage	Greater Reading area	Reading, PA	previously in Pro Select
West Michigan Edge	Grand Rapids area	Kentwood, MI	returned from hiatus

=== Folding ===
- Five teams left the league prior to the beginning of the season:
  - Calgary Storm Prospects - Calgary, Alberta
  - Greenville Lions - Greenville, South Carolina
  - Houston Toros - Houston, Texas
  - Jersey Shore Boca - Toms River, New Jersey
  - Worcester Kings - Worcester, Massachusetts

== Standings ==
Legend
Division champion
Team qualified for playoff berth

=== Central Conference ===
==== Great Lakes Division ====
Pos	Team	Pld	W	L	T	GF	GA	GD	Pts
1	Michigan Bucks	16	11	3	2	47	16	+31	35
2	Fort Wayne Fever	16	11	4	1	47	32	+15	34
3	Indiana Invaders	16	11	5	0	51	34	+17	33
4	Kalamazoo Kingdom	16	8	6	2	30	25	+5	26
5	Toledo Slayers	16	6	10	0	33	36	−3	18
6	West Michigan Edge*	15	4	11	0	26	50	−24	12
7	Cleveland Internationals*	16	2	13	1	19	53	−34	7
8	Columbus Shooting Stars	0	0	0	0	0	0	0	0

==== Heartland Division ====
Pos	Team	Pld	W	L	T	GF	GA	GD	Pts
1	Chicago Fire Reserves (R)	18	17	0	1	73	7	+66	52
2	Boulder Rapids Reserve	18	13	4	1	51	28	+23	40
3	Des Moines Menace	18	12	6	0	51	29	+22	36
4	Thunder Bay Chill	18	11	7	0	28	28	0	33
5	St. Louis Strikers	18	7	11	0	34	63	−29	21
6	Kansas City Brass	18	6	11	1	36	60	−24	19
7	Colorado Springs Blizzard	18	5	11	2	36	48	−12	17
8	Sioux Falls Spitfire	18	5	12	1	45	57	−12	16
9	Indiana Blast	18	5	12	1	38	56	−18	16
10	Wisconsin Rebels	18	2	15	1	26	71	−45	7

(R) Regular Season Champions

=== Eastern Conference ===
==== Mid Atlantic Division ====
Pos	Team	Pld	W	L	T	GF	GA	GD	Pts
1	Carolina Dynamo	18	11	6	1	58	37	+21	34
2	Williamsburg Legacy	18	11	7	0	35	27	+8	33
3	Richmond Kickers Future	18	9	5	4	48	31	+17	31
4	Raleigh CASL Elite	18	7	9	2	26	44	−18	23
5	Chesapeake Dragons	18	4	13	1	35	55	−20	13
6	West Virginia Chaos	18	4	13	1	25	46	−21	13

==== Northeast Division ====
Pos	Team	Pld	W	L	T	GF	GA	GD	Pts
1	South Jersey Barons	18	14	0	4	50	15	+35	46
2	Cape Cod Crusaders	18	13	5	0	38	15	+23	39
3	Albany Blackwatch Highlanders	18	12	3	3	45	23	+22	39
4	Rhode Island Stingrays	18	10	8	0	55	34	+21	30
5	Reading Rage	18	8	8	2	32	25	+7	26
6	Brooklyn Knights	18	8	9	1	34	39	−5	25
7	New Jersey Stallions	18	4	13	1	19	43	−24	13
8	Vermont Voltage	18	2	15	1	11	58	−47	7
9	Jersey Falcons	18	2	16	0	18	68	−50	5 (Note: 1 point deducted)

=== Southern Conference ===
==== Mid South Division ====
Pos	Team	Pld	W	L	T	GF	GA	GD	Pts
1	El Paso Patriots	18	15	3	0	64	23	+41	45
2	DFW Tornados	18	14	4	0	52	19	+33	41 (Note: 1 point deducted)
3	Memphis Express	18	12	6	0	37	23	+14	36
4	Nashville Metros	18	7	9	2	31	32	−1	23
5	New Orleans Shell Shockers	18	5	12	1	26	54	−28	15 (Note: 1 point deducted)
6	Lafayette Swamp Cats	18	4	13	1	19	52	−33	13
7	Austin Lightning	18	2	13	3	21	46	−25	9
8	Laredo Heat *	8	2	5	1	12	15	−3	7

==== Southeast Division ====
Pos	Team	Pld	W	L	T	GF	GA	GD	Pts
1	Central Florida Kraze	18	14	3	1	46	19	+27	43
2	Cocoa Expos	18	11	5	2	39	26	+13	35
3	Ajax Orlando Prospects	18	11	6	1	47	26	+21	34
4	Bradenton Academics	18	8	10	0	35	34	+1	24
5	Palm Beach Pumas	18	2	16	0	18	67	−49	6

=== Western Conference ===
==== Northwest Division ====
Pos	Team	Pld	W	L	T	GF	GA	GD	Pts
1	Cascade Surge	16	11	4	1	40	23	+17	34
2	Spokane Shadow	16	11	4	1	36	31	+5	34
3	Abbotsford Rangers	16	4	11	1	22	36	−14	13
4	Yakima Reds	16	3	11	2	27	37	−10	11

==== Southwest Division ====
Pos	Team	Pld	W	L	T	GF	GA	GD	Pts
1	Orange County Blue Star	18	12	3	3	39	21	+18	39
2	Fresno Fuego	18	11	5	2	46	27	+19	35
3	Southern California Seahorses	18	8	7	3	41	34	+7	27
4	BYU Cougars	18	8	9	1	36	35	+1	25
5	Nevada Wonders	18	6	11	1	29	44	−15	19

== Playoffs ==
Conference Semifinals
NE1	(New Jersey) South Jersey Barons	2
MA2	(Virginia) Williamsburg Legacy	1
Eastern Conference
MA1	(North Carolina) Carolina Dynamo	3
NE2	(Massachusetts) Cape Cod Crusaders	2
MS1	(Texas) El Paso Patriots	4
SE2	(Florida) Cocoa Expos	5
Southern Conference
SE1	Central Florida Kraze	4
MS2	(Texas) DFW Tornados	2
HL1	(Illinois) Chicago Fire Reserves	3
GL2	(Indiana) Fort Wayne Fever	1
Central Conference
GL1	Michigan Bucks	2
HL2	(Colorado) Boulder Rapids Reserve	3
SW1	(California) Orange County Blue Star	3
NW2	(Washington (state)) Spokane Shadow	2
Western Conference
NW1	(Oregon) Cascade Surge	1
SW2	(California) Fresno Fuego	2

Conference Finals
NE1	(New Jersey) South Jersey Barons	2
MA1	(North Carolina) Carolina Dynamo	3
SE2	(Florida) Cocoa Expos	1
SE1	Central Florida Kraze	3
HL1	(Illinois) Chicago Fire Reserves	0
HL2	(Colorado) Boulder Rapids Reserve	1
SW1	(California) Orange County Blue Star	1
SW2	(California) Fresno Fuego	2

National Semifinals
MA1	(North Carolina) Carolina Dynamo	1 (1)
SE1	Central Florida Kraze (PSO)	1 (2)
HL2	(Colorado) Boulder Rapids Reserve	3
SW2	(California) Fresno Fuego	0

PDL Championship Game
SE1	Central Florida Kraze	1
HL2	(Colorado) Boulder Rapids Reserve	0

=== Conference semifinals ===
July 23, 2004
5:30 PM EDT

(New Jersey) South Jersey Barons	2–1 (OT)	(Virginia) Williamsburg Legacy
Ruben Mingo 47'; Neil Holloway (yellow card) 66'; Matt Maher 94'	Report	(yellow card) 9' (goal) 87' Patrick Scherder; (yellow card) 60' Gonzalo Segares; (yellow card) 63' Robbie Wright; (yellow card) 76' Clayton Voss

Macpherson Stadium
Browns Summit, North Carolina
Referee: Jeff Muschik

July 23, 2004
6:00 PM EDT

Michigan Bucks	2–3	(Colorado) Boulder Rapids Reserve
Richard Strong 17'; Mychal Turpin (yellow card) 33'; Joseph Kabwe 70'	Report	(yellow card) 34' John Pulido (yellow card) 34'; 51' Miguel Guante; (yellow card) 66' Colin Clark; (yellow card) 68' (goal) 74' Brett Branan; 82' (pen.) Javier Vegas

Hefner Stadium
Fort Wayne, Indiana
Attendance: 350
Referee: David Jarze

July 23, 2004
6:00 PM EDT

(Texas) El Paso Patriots	4–5	(Florida) Cocoa Expos
Miguel Larrosa 12', 32' (pen.) (yellow card) 67'; Salvador Mercado 23'; Esteban Palacios (yellow card) 34'; Ricky Francis 77'; Paul Cabrera (yellow card) 87'	Report	30' (pen.) Frederico Moojen; 45' Jordan Hughes; (yellow card) 51' Derek Smith; 70', 90' David Atkinson; 74' Robin Chan; (yellow card) 82' Charles Hupp; (yellow card) 85' Declain McGrory; (yellow card) 90' James Phillips

Showalter Field
Winter Park, Florida
Attendance: 400
Referee: Merrit Guthrie

July 23, 2004
7:30 PM EDT

(North Carolina) Carolina Dynamo	3–2	(Massachusetts) Cape Cod Crusaders
Marcus Storey 6', 81'; Michael Farrell (yellow card) 51'; Jamal Shteiwi 89'	Report	4' Thucanil Ncube; 32' Brendan Burke; (yellow card) 47' Neil Jones; (yellow card) 78' David Bulow; (red card) 90' Kurt Morsink

Macpherson Stadium
Browns Summit, North Carolina
Attendance: 874

July 23, 2004
8:00 PM EDT

(California) Orange County Blue Star	3–2 (OT)	(Washington (state)) Spokane Shadow
Nick Theslof 14'; Michael Enfield 18' 100'; Cameron Dunn (yellow card) 71'; Daniel Kennedy (yellow card) 94'	Report	9' (yellow card) 89' Kieran Barton; (yellow card) 25' (goal) 83' Garth Cummings; (yellow card) 44' Evan Cummings; (yellow card) 49' Troy Ready; (yellow card) 65' Brett Hite

Fresno Pacific University
Fresno, California
Attendance: 1,327
Referee: Dinesh Singh

July 23, 2004
8:00 PM EDT

Central Florida Kraze	4–2	(Texas) DFW Tornados
Orville Mullings 22', 74', 78'; Sasha Barber (yellow card) 44'; Sean Steed (yellow card) 55'; Sherwin Sargeant (yellow card) 61'; Daniel Robertson (yellow card) 82'; Clifton Philip 90'	Report	49' James Koehler; 58' Mark Rowland; (yellow card) 74' Joard Odera; (yellow card) 78' Robert Hammett

Showalter Field
Winter Park, Florida
Attendance: 450
Referee: Shane Moody

July 23, 2004
8:30 PM EDT

(Indiana) Fort Wayne Fever	1–3	(Illinois) Chicago Fire Reserves
Paul Dolinsky (yellow card) 38'; Josh Tudela 44'; Salim Bullen (yellow card) 79'	Report	19' James Klatter; 47' Nowaf Jaman; (yellow card) 75' Daniel O'Rourke; 88' Julian Nash

Hefner Stadium
Fort Wayne, Indiana
Attendance: 690
Referee: Tony Delois

July 23, 2004
10:30 PM EDT

(California) Fresno Fuego	2–1	(Oregon) Cascade Surge
Jarrod Souza (yellow card) 39'; Victor Lopez (yellow card) 42'; Eddie Gutierrez 45'; Gaston Cignetti (yellow card) 58'; Raul Rivera 70'; Orlando Ramirez (yellow card) 87'	Report	(yellow card) 13' Nick Donaldson; (yellow card) 24' Carlos Calderson; 31' (yellow card) 33' Adrian Balc; (yellow card) 44' Dana McGregor; (yellow card) 84' Andriy Budnyy

Fresno Pacific University
Fresno, California
Attendance: 1,675
Referee: Miguel Chicas

=== Conference Finals ===
July 24, 2004
7:30 PM EDT

(North Carolina) Carolina Dynamo	3–2	(New Jersey) South Jersey Barons
Jamal Shteiwi 10'; Michael Farrell (yellow card) 21'; Marcus Storey 40'; Ryan Caugherty 90'	Report	(yellow card) 15' (goal) 38' Ruben Mingo; 44' (pen.) Tony Donatelli; (yellow card) 45' Leon Brown; (yellow card) 51' David Daigle; (yellow card) 71' (yellow-red card) 88' Gene Braxton

Macpherson Stadium
Browns Summit, North Carolina
Attendance: 1,021
Referee: Mark Kadlecik

July 24, 2004
8:00 PM EDT

Central Florida Kraze	3–1	(Florida) Cocoa Expos
Orville Mullings 19'; William Judino (yellow card) 40'; Justin Cook 44'; Jonathan Hargis (yellow card) 58'; Sasha Barber (yellow card) 62'; Sherwin Sargeant (yellow card) 68'; Clifton Philip 90'	Report 1 Report 2	(red card) 42' Andrew Sypura; (yellow card) 77' (goal) 89' James Phillips; (yellow card) 90' Matthew Balkanloo; (yellow card) 90' Derek Smith

Showalter Field
Winter Park, Florida
Attendance: 2,200
Referee: Chris Kenney

July 24, 2004
8:30 PM EDT

(Illinois) Chicago Fire Reserves	0–1 (OT)	(Colorado) Boulder Rapids Reserve
Drew Moor (yellow card) 20'; Thabiso Khumalo (yellow card) 52'; Daniel O'Rourke (yellow card) 90'	Report	(yellow card) 47' Colin Clark; (yellow card) 90' 98' John Pulido; (yellow card) 90' Brett Branan

Hefner Stadium
Fort Wayne, Indiana
Attendance: 160
Referee: Cien Asoera

July 24, 2004
10:30 PM EDT

(California) Fresno Fuego	2–1	(California) Orange County Blue Star
Gaston Cignetti (yellow card) 29' (goal) 47'; Raul Rivera 51' (yellow card) 51'; Derek Lopez (yellow card) 69'	Report	20' Brad Evans; (yellow card) 64' Rogelio Lopez; (yellow card) 71' (yellow-red card) 90' Thomas Poltl; (yellow card) 82' (yellow-red card) 90' Cameron Dunn

Fresno Pacific University
Fresno, California
Attendance: 2,177
Referee: Cory Dean

=== National Semifinals ===
July 30, 2004
7:30 PM EDT

(Colorado) Boulder Rapids Reserve	3–0	(California) Fresno Fuego
Javier Vegas 47' (pen.) (yellow card) 83'; Alejandro Salazar 60'; Peter Lowry 84'; Aaron Pitchkolan (yellow card) 88'	Report	(yellow card) 85' Marco Lopez

Pleasant View Field
Boulder, Colorado
Attendance: 500
Referee: Jose Carro

July 31, 2004
8:00 PM EDT

Central Florida Kraze	1–1 (a.e.t.)	(North Carolina) Carolina Dynamo
Eric Vasquez (yellow card) 41'; Justin Cook 45'; Sherwin Sargeant (yellow card) 46'; Orville Mullings (yellow card) 90'; Clifton Philip (yellow card) 90'	Report	27' (yellow card) 68' Stephen Rhyne; (yellow card) 84' James Riley; (yellow card) 115' Ryan Caugherty
Penalties
Sean Steed (penalty missed); Eric Vasquez (penalty missed); Sasha Barber (penalty scored); Xavier Delgado (penalty missed); Daniell Robertson (penalty scored)	2–1	(penalty scored) James Riley; (penalty missed) Ryan Caugherty; (penalty missed) Tim Merritt; (penalty missed) Marcus Storey; (penalty missed) Amir Lowery

UCF Soccer Complex
Orlando, Florida
Attendance: 750
Referee: Sean Hurd

=== PDL Championship Game ===
August 7, 2004
7:00 PM EDT

Central Florida Kraze	1–0	(Colorado) Boulder Rapids Reserve
Justin Cook 88'

UCF Soccer Complex
Orlando, Florida

Championship MVP: (United States) Justin Cook (CFK)

== Awards ==
=== Year End Awards ===
Scoring Champion: (Mexico) Daniel Frías (El Paso Patriots) 56 Points (25 Goals, 6 Assists)
Golden Boot: (Mexico) Daniel Frías (El Paso Patriots) (25 Goals)
Assists Champion: (United States) Mark Rowland (DFW Tornados) (11 Assists)
GAA Champion: (United States) Brad Guzan (Chicago Fire Reserves) 0.39 Goals Against
MVP: (United States) Ruben Mingo (South Jersey Barons)
Rookie of the Year: (United States) Justin Moose (Carolina Dynamo)
U19 Player of the Year: (United States) Brett Hite (Spokane Shadow)
Defender of the Year: (England) John Thompson (South Jersey Barons)
Goalkeeper of the Year: (United States) Brad Guzan (Chicago Fire Reserves)
Coach of the Year: (United States) Dan Christian (South Jersey Barons)

=== Weekly awards ===
Player of the Week
Week	Player	Club	Position	Reason	Ref.
1	(United States) Orlando Ramirez	Fresno Fuego	Forward	2 goals, assist in 5-1 win at San Diego Guachos	
2	(United States) Steve Patterson	Orange County Blue Star	Forward	Two goals in 2-0 win at Nevada Wonders	
3	(United States) Bryce Wegerle	Cocoa Expos	Midfielder	Two goals in 2-1, 1-0 wins over Central Florida Kraze, Ajax Orlando Prospects	
4	(United States) Mike Todd	Brooklyn Knights	Forward	4 goals in pair of wins	
5	(Bosnia and Herzegovina) Vedad Ibišević	St. Louis Strikers	Forward	5 goals in 6-4 win over Kansas City Brass	
6	(United States) Brad Guzan	Chicago Fire Reserves	Goalkeeper	Three shutouts against Wisconsin Blast, Thunder Bay Chill, and Des Moines Menace	
7	(United States) Tony Amato	Cocoa Expos	Midfielder	Hat-trick in 3-2 OT win over Palm Beach Pumas	
8	(United States) Alejandro Salazar	Boulder Rapids Reserve	Midfielder	4 goals, 2 assists in 2 wins, draw	
9	(United States) Alex Brown	Williamsburg Legacy	Defender	2 goals, 1 assist in 5-4 OT win at Sioux Falls Spitfire	
10	(England) Dan Broxup	Fort Wayne Fever	Forward	Hat-trick, assist in 4-1 win over Toledo Slayers	
11	(Brazil) Zico Antunes	Rhode Island Stingrays	Forward	Hat-trick, assist in 5-2 win over Western Mass Pioneers	
12	(United States) David Bulow	Cape Cod Crusaders	Forward	Hat-trick in 4-3 OT win at Reading Rage	
13	(Jamaica) Orville Mullings	Central Florida Kraze	Forward	Seven goals in wins at Lafayette Swamp Cats, New Orleans Shell Shockers	
14	(United States) David Bulow	Cape Cod Crusaders	Forward	Four goals, two assists in pair of wins	

Team of the Week
Week	Goalkeeper	Defenders	Midfielders	Forwards	Ref.
3	(Colombia) Rengifo (NEV)	(United States) Ward (SCS) (Scotland) McAnespie (NO) (United States) Thibodeau (STL)	(United States) Wegerle (COA) (United States) Rosenthal (KCB) (United States) Loera (NEV) (Republic of Ireland) Veldhouse (SFS)	(Mexico) Contreras (FRE) (Bosnia and Herzegovina) Ibišević (STL) (United States) Stanco (REA)	
4	(Mexico) Gallardo (AUS)	(United States) Odera (DFW) (United States) Ward (SCS) (United States) Stueckle (SPO)	(United States) Kuykendall (CCC} (United States) Segastume (COS) (United States) Fernandes (RIS) (United States) Albert (WIL)	(Brazil) Andrade (DFW) (United States) Rowland (DFW) (United States) Todd (BRO)	
5	(United States) Carney (NO)	(United States) Rotunno (CAS) (England) Thompson (SJB) (United States) Taylor (MIC)	(United States) John (KCB) (United States) Elkins (SCS) (United States) Popovich (ABH) (Canada) Simpson (BRR)	(Mexico) Frías (ELP) (Bosnia and Herzegovina) Ibišević (STL) (United States) Cameron (MIC)	
6	(United States) Guzan (CHI)	(United States) Blinzler (KCB) (United States) Robbins (NAS) (United States) Banks (SJB)	(United States) Johnson (SPO) (Zimbabwe) Chisoni (IND) (United States) McCormick (RIC)	(United States) Storey (CAR) (Mexico) Larrosa (ELP) (United States) McGinnis (COS) (Democratic Republic of the Congo) Mupier (AOP)	
7	(United States) Eylander (YAK)	(United States) Taylor (MIC) (United States) Oyler (BYU) (United States) Lewis (MEM)	(United States) Amato (COA) (Mexico) Barrera (ELP) (United States) Tudela (FWF) (United States) Chapoy (REA)	(United States) Bulow (CCC) (United States) Mehreioskouei (CHI) (United States) Hite (SPO)	
8	(Republic of Ireland) O'Hara (RIC)	(United States) Schroeder (SCS) (United States) Whyte (NAS) (United States) Cofar (NJS)	(United States) Fauske (CAS) (Zimbabwe) Chisoni (IND) (United States) Anderson (KCB) (United States) Salazar (BRR)	(England) Broxup (FWF) (Jamaica) Mullings (CFK) (United States) Bickford (RAL)	
9	(United States) Hannigan (SJB)	(Canada) Ballard (ABB) (United States) Brown (WIL) (United States) Coleman (REA)	(United States) Ramirez (FRE) (United States) Rowland (IND) (United States) O'Brien (CCC) (United States) Cameron (MIC)	(Bosnia and Herzegovina) Kafedžić (STL) (Jamaica) Mullings (CFK) (Kuwait) Jaman (CHI)	
10	(United States) Connelly (WIL)	(South Korea) Barnes (ABH) (United States) Hargis (CFK) (United States) Cruz (DFW)	(United States) Cuevas (AOP) (United States) Oliveria (WVC) (United States) Kirk (INB) (United States) Ryan (KCB)	(England) Broxup (FWF) (Uganda) Mugabi (KAL) (Ukraine) Budnyi (CAS)	
11	(United States) Mahoney (CCC)	(United States) Bourne (DMM) (United States) Hargis (CFK) (Canada) Christey (TBC)	(United States) Fauske (CAS) (United States) Rowland (IND) (United States) Severs (REA) (United States) Moose (CAR)	(United States) Nonnemacher (YAK) (Brazil) Antunes (RIS) (Mexico) Frías (ELP)	
12	(United States) Guzan (CHI)	(United States) Steed (CFK) (Canada) Ballard (ABB) (Trinidad and Tobago) L. Brown (SJB)	(United States) McGregor (CAS) (United States) Popovich (ABH) (United States) Poltl (OC) (Zimbabwe) Kabwe (MIC)	(United States) Bulow (CCC) (United States) Gold (BRD) (United States) Mingo (SJB)	
13	(United States) Graham (REA)	(United States) Tolleson (CAS) (United States) Padilla (FRE) (England) Thompson (SJB)	(United States) Shteiwi (CAR) (Eswatini) Seilbea (NAS) (Zimbabwe) Kabwe (MIC) (United States) Rowland (IND)	(Jamaica) Mullings (CFK) (United States) Cameron (MIC) (Canada) Androutsos (TBC)	
14	(United States) Guzan (CHI)	(New Zealand) Lochhead (OC) (United States) Taylor (MIC) (Brazil) Olivera (DMM)	(United States) Vasquez (CFK) (Federal Republic of Yugoslavia) Holloway (SJB) (Canada) Moojen (COA) (United States) Allberry (SPO)	(United States) Wylie (SFS) (Romania) Neagu (IND) (United States) Bulow (CCC)	

== All-League and All- Conference Teams ==
=== Central Conference ===
F: (England) Dan Broxup (FWF), (United States) Hamid Mehreioskouei (CHI), (United States) Kenny Uzoigwe (TOL)
M: (Bulgaria) Lubo Bogdanov (SFS), (Zimbabwe) Mubarike Chisoni (IND)*, (United States) Jeff Rowland (IND), (Canada) Josh Simpson (BRR)
D: (Zimbabwe) Methembe Ndlovu (IND), (United States) Erik Nelson (MIC), (United States) Kevin Taylor (MIC)*
G: (United States) Brad Guzan (CHI)*

=== Eastern Conference ===
F: (Brazil) Zico Antunes (RIS), (United States) David Bulow (CCC)*, (United States) Ruben Mingo (SJB)*
M: (United States) Neil Holloway (SJB)*, (United States) Justin Moose (CAR), (Costa Rica) Jose Umana (WIL), (United States) Gregory Victor (ABH)
D: (United States) Tim Merritt (CAR), (England) John Thompson (SJB)*, (United States) Chris Williams (SJB),
G: (United States) Stash Graham (REA)

=== Southern Conference ===
F: (Brazil) Lourenço Andrade (DFW), (Mexico) Daniel Frías (ELP)*, (Jamaica) Orville Mullings (CFK)
M: (England) Ian Bishop (NO), (Malaysia) Robin Chan (COA), (Brazil) Diego Silvy (MEM), (United States) Eric Vasquez (CFK)*
D: (United States) Christian Cuevas (AOP), (United States) Greg Devito (COA), (United States) Robert Gibbons (CFK)
G: (United States) Ryan McIntosh (CFK)

=== Western Conference ===
F: (Ukraine) Andriy Budnyi (CAS), (Mexico) Edgardo Contreras (FRE), (United States) Brett Hite (SPK)
M: (Brazil) Fabricio Codeceira (FRE), (United States) John Palladino (SPK), (United States) Tom Poltl (OC)*, (Canada) Michael Riehl (ABB)
D: (New Zealand) Tony Lochhead (OC), (United States) Brad Peterson (BYU), (United States) Jeremy Tolleson (CAS)*
G: (United States) Eric Reid (SCS)

* denotes All-League selection

=== All-League Team ===
F: (United States) David Bulow (CCC), (United States) Ruben Mingo (SJB) (League MVP), (Mexico) Daniel Frías (ELP) (Scoring Champion and Golden Boot)
M: (Zimbabwe) Mubarike Chisoni (IND), (United States) Neil Holloway (SJB), (United States) Tom Poltl (OC), (United States) Eric Vasquez (CFK)
D: (United States) Kevin Taylor (MIC), (England) John Thompson (SJB) (Defender of the Year), (United States) Jeremy Tolleson (CAS)
G: (United States) Brad Guzan (CHI) (Goalkeeper of the Year and GAA Champion)
