= Spendlove =

Spendlove is a surname. Notable people with the surname include:

- Ben Spendlove (born 1978), British cricketer
- Chris Spendlove (born 1984), British footballer
- Randy Spendlove, American record producer, songwriter, and music executive
- Richard Spendlove (born 1939), British radio producer/presenter and television writer
- Rob Spendlove (born 1953), British actor
- Robert Spendlove, American politician
- Ryan Spendlove, British singer-songwriter
