= Paul Ballard =

Paul Ballard may refer to:

- Paul Ballard (rugby league) (born 1984), English rugby player
- Paul Ballard (actor) (born 1982), English television presenter
- Paul Ballard (soccer) (born 1983), Canadian soccer player
- Paul Ballard (Dollhouse), fictional character on Dollhouse played by Tahmoh Penikett
