= Cincinnati Kings =

- Full name: Cincinnati Kings
- Nickname: Kings
- Founded: 2005
- Stadium: Town and Country Sports Complex; Wilder, Kentucky
- Capacity: 3,000
- Owner: Yacoub Abdallahi
- Head Coach: Roby Stahl
- League: USL Premier Development League
- 2011: 8th, Great Lakes; Playoffs: DNQ
- Website: http://www.kingssa.com

Cincinnati Kings were a professional American soccer club based in Cincinnati, Ohio, United States. Founded in 2005, the team played in the USL Premier Development League (PDL), the fourth tier of the American Soccer Pyramid, in the Great Lakes Division of the Central Conference.

The Cincinnati Kings indoor team was founded in 2008. The club was formed to provide year-round professional soccer in Cincinnati.

The team played its home games at the Town and Country Sports Complex in nearby Wilder, Kentucky, where they played starting in 2007. The team's colors were red and black.

== History ==
=== USL Second Division ===
The Cincinnati Kings first entered the USL Second Division in 2005, under the leadership of Yacoub Abdallahi, an entrepreneur from Mauritania in Africa who graduated from Northern Kentucky University, and player-manager Jon Pickup, a former English U-16 international, who played professionally in England with Wigan Athletic, Blackburn Rovers and Chester City. From their home at Corcoran Field on the campus of Xavier University, the Kings made an immediate splash in the league, remaining unbeaten in their first five games, and enjoying a comprehensive 5–0 win over Northern Virginia Royals in just their second ever competitive match. However, Cincinnati's mid-season form stuttered slightly; the Kings lost four in a row, conceding a late goal against Long Island Rough Riders, and giving Wilmington Hammerheads and own-goal winner in the first game of June. Even their first foray into the US Open Cup was a disappointing one, as they shockingly lost 4–2 in the first round to Indianapolis-based USASA amateur side Reggae Boyz. This, really, remained the story for much of the rest of the season. Xavier University was not the fortress they needed it to be, and despite an away win over Charlotte Eagles in early July, and a 4–1 thrashing of Northern Virginia Royals on the last day of the season, the Kings finished their first year in 5th place behind regular season champions Western Mass Pioneers. George Kithas was the top scorer with 5 goals; Jack Cummings and Tiest Sondaal were the top assist providers with three each.

2006 was a slight improvement for the Kings. Despite losing their opening two fixtures, the Kings nevertheless became a tough team to beat, and enjoyed improved home form throughout the season. The Kings' main problem was a lack of consistency, and their inability to build any kind of unbeaten momentum – their strongest run of form coming towards the end of July when they rattled off four wins in a row, including two 4-goal hauls against Long Island Rough Riders. Most of the rest of the time, however, win followed loss followed win followed loss, and all the while the Kings lost ground on the teams ahead of them. For the second consecutive year the Kings' US Open Cup run was a short one, going out at the first hurdle with a 2–1 loss to PDL side Michigan Bucks. However, despite losing their final two regular season games of the year to Pittsburgh Riverhounds and Western Mass Pioneers, their results were enough to leave them in fourth place in the table, and in the playoffs. They were drawn against Richmond Kickers in the semi-final; Richmond took the first leg at home in Virginia 2–1, and despite a home crowd of 1,465, and despite outshooting the Kickers, the Kings simply couldn't find the net in the second leg, and Richmond went through to the final 2–1 on aggregate. Jeff Hughes and John Krause were Cincinnati's top scorers, with 4 goals each, Nowaf Jaman contributed 4 assists, and head coach Pickup was named USL2 Manager of the Year.

2007, however, was tough all round for the Ohioans. The year started positively with a move away from University accommodation to the Town and Country Sports Club, just across the border in Wilder, Kentucky, which owner Yacoub purchased as the Kings' permanent home for $11.3 million. On the field, however, the Kings' fortunes were much less favorable. The Kings only managed two wins – 1–0 over Crystal Palace Baltimore and 4–0 over New Hampshire Phantoms – in their first ten games, and by the end of June were already struggling to remain in contention for the playoffs. For the third year in a row the Kings' US Open Cup run lasted just one game, as they lost to a USASA side for the second time – this time a 1–0 defeat to National Premier Soccer League team Milwaukee Bavarians – and this seemed to signal Cincinnati's doom for the rest of the season. The Kings just managed to win just two more regular season games – 1–0 over Richmond Kickers in July and 3–1 over New Hampshire Phantoms on the last day of the season – eventually finishing a distant 8th in the table. Chad Eckerlin and Byron Neal did score 13 goals between them, but on the whole it was a hugely disappointing season for the Kings.

Prior to the beginning of the 2008 season, it was announced that the Kings would be taking voluntary relegation, and would henceforth be competing in the USL Premier Development League.

=== USL Premier Development League ===
The Kings' first season in the PDL did not go entirely to plan, despite winning their opening game 1–0 over the Indiana Invaders. The Kings lost five of their next six games, dropping 3–0 to Ohio rivals Cleveland Internationals, and only just scraping past West Virginia Chaos 2–1 off a late, late winner from Braden Bishop. Things didn't get much better during the middle of the season; Cleveland compounded their state superiority with a thumping 5–1 win at the end of July, and although the Kings managed to hold perennial powerhouses Chicago Fire Premier to a goalless draw, and pick up another win over West Virginia, things were generally fairly grim. The Kings were out of the playoff race by mid-August, and dropped three of their last five games, including a 0–4 loss to Toronto Lynx on the final day of the season. Thy eventually finished fourth in their division, almost 30 points behind league-leaders Michigan Bucks; Branden Stelmak was the top scorer, the 5 goals on the season.

2009 was not much better for the Kings. In their second season in the amateur ranks they managed just four wins in a difficult season – a 2–0 win over the Indiana Invaders in May, a pair of 3–1 wins over Fort Wayne Fever in June, and a 3–2 win over Toronto Lynx in July in which substitute Judson McKinney scored a last minute winner. The rest of the year was a disappointment, especially on the defensive end; they conceded three goals on five occasions, including four of their first five games of the season. Their worst defeat of the season was the 5–1 thrashing they suffered at the hands of Chicago Fire Premier in July. The Kings finished the season in 8th place in the Great Lakes division, decisively out of the playoffs; Judson McKinney was the team's top scorer, with four goals, while Aaron Miller and Jonathan Sutton contributed two assists each.

== Players ==
=== Final roster ===
As of June 7, 2011.

Note: Flags indicate national team as defined under FIFA eligibility rules; some limited exceptions apply. Players may hold more than one non-FIFA nationality.

No.	Pos.	Nation	Player
30	GK	USA	Tristram Barnard
31	MF	USA	Dylan Lax
32	DF	USA	Darius Khan
33	MF	USA	Jonathan Williams
34	DF	JAM	Kemar Jackson
35	DF	USA	Kyle Culbertson
36	FW	USA	Ben Thomas
37	FW	JAM	Andre Sharpe
38	MF	JAM	Shamar Shelton
39	FW	USA	Branden Stelmak
41	MF	USA	D. J. Albert
42	MF	USA	Aaron Denney
43	MF	USA	Brent Hobson

No.	Pos.	Nation	Player
44	FW	USA	Marc Miller
45	FW	USA	Alex Konchar
14	FW	USA	Bryan Kanu
46	MF	IRL	Andrew Montgomery
47	MF	ENG	Chris Elliott
48	DF	USA	Matt McKain
50	GK	EST	Kaido Koppel
51	MF	USA	Justin Robbins
53	DF	USA	Chris Dobrowolski
54	DF	USA	Jamie Dollar
55	DF	USA	Alex Hadley
56	DF	USA	Brodie Steigerwald
—	DF	USA	Michael Bartlett
—	DF	USA	William Peppard
—	FW	NIR	Barry Magee

=== Notable former players ===
This list of notable former players comprises players who went on to play professional soccer after playing for the team in the Premier Development League, or those who previously played professionally before joining the team.

- (United States) Trey Alexander
- (United States) Derek Smith
- (Mexico) Ivan Becerra
- (France) Moussa Dagnogo
- (France) François Dubourdeau
- (United States) Kwame Sarkodie
- (United States) Jeff Hughes
- (United States) Jordan James
- (United States) John Krause
- (Scotland) John McGinlay
- (England) Michael McGinlay
- (United States) Nathan Micklos
- (Philippines) Charley Pettys
- (Benin) Florent Raimy

== Year-by-year ==
Year	Division	League	Regular season	Playoffs	Open Cup
2005	3	USL Second Division	5th	Did not qualify	1st round
2006	3	USL Second Division	4th	Semifinals	2nd round
2007	3	USL Second Division	8th	Did not qualify	1st round
2008	4	USL PDL	4th, Great Lakes	Did not qualify	Did not qualify
2009	4	USL PDL	8th, Great Lakes	Did not qualify	Did not qualify
2010	4	USL PDL	6th, Great Lakes	Did not qualify	Did not qualify
2011	4	USL PDL	8th, Great Lakes	Did not qualify	Did not qualify
2012	4	USL PDL	4th, Great Lakes	Did not qualify	Did not qualify

== Head coaches ==
- (England) Jon Pickup (2005–2007)
- (United States) Roby Stahl (2008–present)

== Stadia ==
Kings' current stadium, Town and Country Sports Club

- Corcoran Field; Cincinnati, Ohio (2005–2006)
- Town and Country Sports Complex; Wilder, Kentucky (2007–present)

== Average attendance ==
Attendance stats are calculated by averaging each team's self-reported home attendances from the historical match archive at https://web.archive.org/web/20100105175057/http://www.uslsoccer.com/history/index_E.html

- 2005: 1,301
- 2006: 1,153
- 2007: 1,384
- 2008: 214 (44th in PDL)
- 2009: 859 (13th in PDL)
- 2010: 751
- 2011: 151
- 2012: 188

== Supporters ==
In 2006 the Cincinnati Kings supporters founded a group dubbed 'The Pride', inspired by the lion in the club's crest. The dedicated group cheers on the Kings at every game with banners, flags, drums and chants. The Pride's crest has the message Juncta Juvant, which was inspired by the city of Cincinnati flag, which also has the message which means "Strength in Unity". The Pride can be found online at
