= Nathan Micklos =

American soccer player

Personal information
- Date of birth: August 5, 1983 (age 43)
- Place of birth: Palatine, Illinois, United States
- Height: 6 ft 3 in (1.91 m)
- Position: Forward

Youth career
- Chicago Sockers

College career
Years	Team	Apps	(Gls)
2002–2005	Rochester Yellowjackets	75	(57)

Senior career*
Years	Team	Apps	(Gls)
2005	Indiana Invaders	16	(6)
2006	Virginia Beach Mariners	8	(0)
2007	Cincinnati Kings	20	(7)
- * Club domestic league appearances and goals

Nathan Micklos (born August 5, 1983, in Palatine, Illinois) is an American former soccer forward who played professionally in the USL First and USL Second Division.

== Youth ==
Micklos played club soccer with the Chicago Sockers from age thirteen until eighteen. During his time with the team, they won five State Cup Championships, two Region II Championships and finished second at USYSA National Championships. They also won the U-17 Dallas Cup.

In 2002, Micklos graduated from William Fremd High School. He attended the University of Rochester, playing on the men's soccer team from 2002 to 2005. During his four seasons, he set school records for career goals (57), career points (140) and goals in a season (20). Micklos was University Athletic Association's Player of the Year as a junior and senior and the 2005 ESPN The Magazine College Division Academic All-American of the Year. He was an NSCAA Division III Second Team All-American as a junior and Third Team All-American as a senior. He was also named a First Team Scholar All-American by the National Soccer Coaches Association of America. He graduated in December 2005 with a dual bachelor's degrees in political science and history with a minor in philosophy.

== Club ==
During the 2005 college off season, Micklos played for the Indiana Invaders of the USL Premier Development League. In 2006, he began his professional career with the Virginia Beach Mariners after being selected third overall in the USL First Division Draft. In 2007, Micklos moved down to the Cincinnati Kings of the USL Second Division. He retired at the end of the season.
