= Seminole Soccer Complex (Sanford) =

Dedicated soccer park in Sanford, Florida

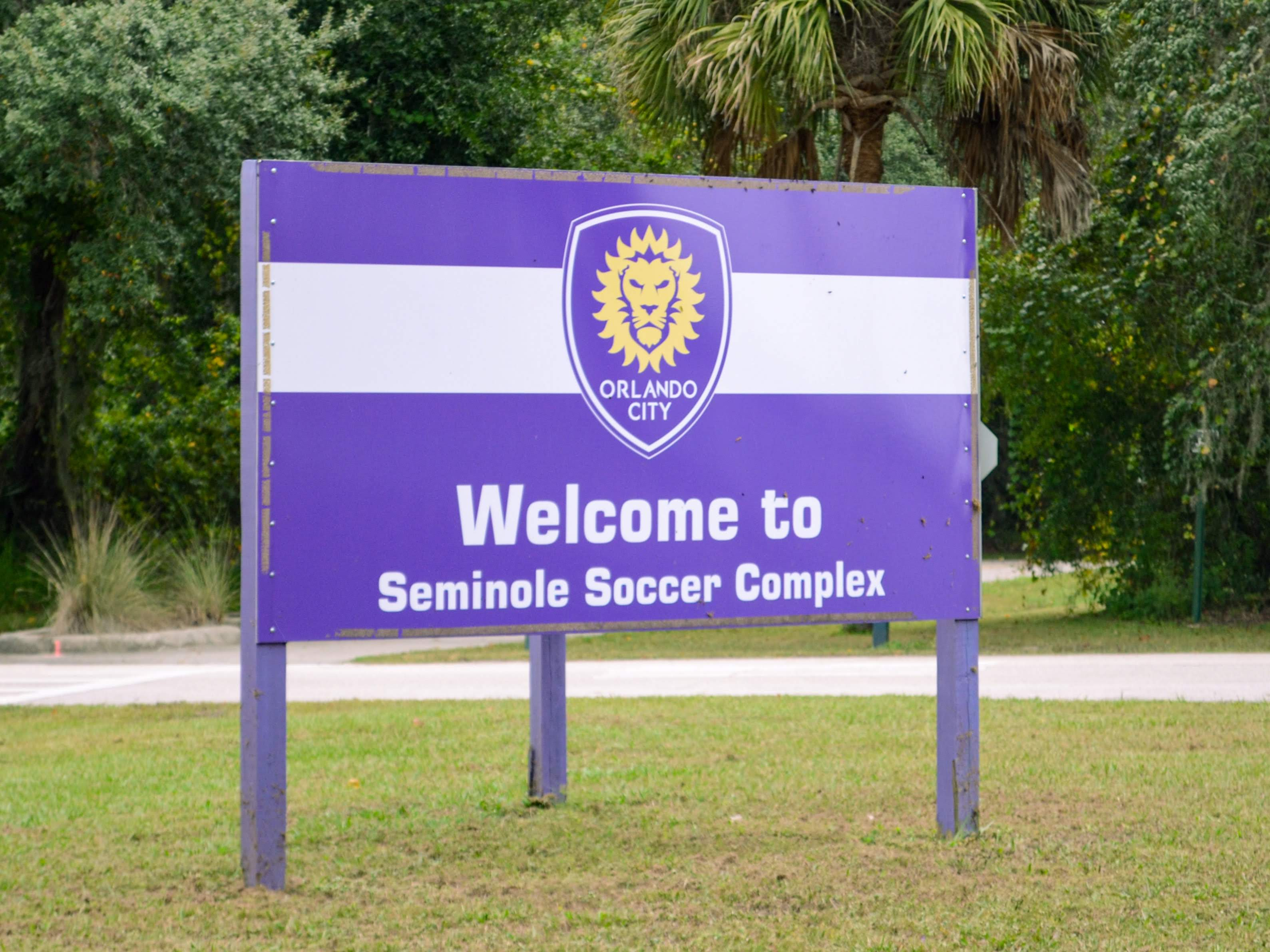
- Welcome sign at the entrance of the Seminole Soccer Complex
- Interactive map of Seminole Soccer Complex
- Location: Sanford, Florida
- Coordinates: 28°47′40.58″N 81°23′18.76″W
- Operator: Orlando City Youth Soccer
- Capacity: 3,666
- Surface: Grass

Construction
- Opened: 1995

Tenant
- Orlando City U-23 (PDL)

The Seminole Soccer Complex is a dedicated soccer park that includes over eleven fields and a soccer-specific stadium, located in Sanford, Seminole County, Florida. The facility is home to the Orlando City U-23 team (formerly known as the Central Florida Kraze). It has been used by the Central Florida Krush, and the Lake Mary High School football team.

Address: 1900 Seminole Soccer Loop Sanford, FL 32771
