= GPS Portland Phoenix =

- Full name: GPS Portland Phoenix
- Nickname: Phoenix
- Founded: 2009
- Dissolved: 2019; 7 years ago
- Stadium: Memorial Stadium; Portland, Maine
- Capacity: 5,200
- Head Coach: Josh Thornton
- League: USL League Two
- 2019: 2nd, Northeast Division; Playoffs: Conference Semifinal
- Website: https://www.mainepremiersoccer.com
Home colors	Away colors

GPS Portland Phoenix was an American soccer team based in Portland, Maine. Founded in 2009, the team played in USL League Two, the fourth tier of the American Soccer Pyramid, in the Northeast Division of the Eastern Conference. It has not played since 2019.

The team played its home games at Memorial Stadium on the campus of Deering High School. The team's colors were sky blue, white and black.

== History ==
The Phoenix acquired their PDL franchise rights from the now-defunct Cape Cod Crusaders, the PDL national champions in 2002 and 2003 who left the league at the end of the 2008 season. They are part of the larger Maine Premier Soccer ("MPS") organization, which was founded in 2009 as a sister company to Massachusetts Premier Soccer, with a mission to develop aspiring professional soccer players and coaches in Maine.

The team played its first official game on May 9, 2010, a 3–0 victory over the Westchester Flames. The first goal in franchise history was scored by Chris Banks.

Global Premier Soccer rebranded the team GPS Portland Phoenix in 2012.

=== Notable former players ===
This list of notable former players comprises players who went on to play professional soccer after playing for the team in the Premier Development League, or those who previously played professionally before joining the team.

- (Nigeria) Ifunanyachi Achara
- (United States) Chris Banks
- (England) Jonathan Barden
- (United States) Kyle Clinton
- (United States) Bryan Gaul
- (United States) Forrest Lasso
- (England) Jason Massie
- (England) Paul Nicholson
- (France) Pierre Omanga
- (United States) Charlie Rugg
- (United States) Aaron Schoenfeld
- (England) Nathaniel Short
- (England) Chris Spendlove
- (Jamaica) Ryan Thompson
- (United States) Brandon Tyler
- (United States) Jacob VanCompernolle

== Year-by-year ==
Year	Level	League	Regular season	Playoffs	U.S. Open Cup
2010	4	USL PDL	2nd, Northeast	Conference Semifinals	did not qualify
2011	4	USL PDL	1st, Northeast	Divisional Playoff	did not qualify
2012	4	USL PDL	2nd, Northeast	Divisional Playoff	did not qualify
2013	4	USL PDL	2nd, Northeast	Divisional Playoff	2nd Round
2014	4	USL PDL	6th, Northeast	did not qualify	1st Round
2015	4	USL PDL	1st, Northeast	Conference Semifinals	did not qualify
2016	4	USL PDL	1st, Northeast	Divisional Playoff	1st Round
2017	4	USL PDL	5th, Northeast	did not qualify	1st Round
2018	4	USL PDL	2nd, Northeast	did not qualify	did not qualify
2019	4	USL League Two	2nd, Northeast	Conference Semifinals	did not qualify
2020	Season cancelled due to COVID-19 pandemic				

== Honors ==
- USL PDL Northeast Division
  - Champions (3): 2011, 2015, 2016

== Head coaches ==
- (Scotland) Alistair Bain (2010–2016)

== Stadia ==
- Memorial Field at Deering High School; Portland, Maine (2010–?)
- Stadium at Scarborough High School; Scarborough, Maine 2 games (2010–2011)
- Stadium at Windham High School; Windham, Maine 1 game (2010)

== Average attendance ==
Attendance stats are calculated by averaging each team's self-reported home attendances from the historical match archive.

- 2010: 426
- 2011: 483
- 2012: 550
- 2013: 584
- 2014: 525
- 2015: 512
