= DeLand High School =

Public high school in DeLand, Florida, United States

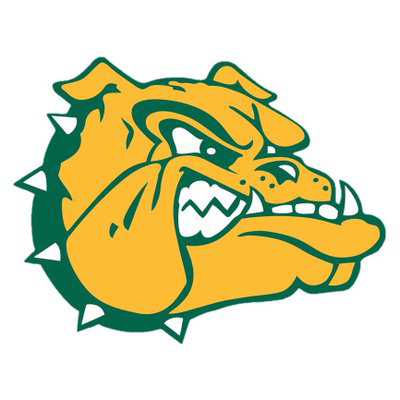

Location
- 800 North Hill Avenue; DeLand, Florida 32724-3726; United States; 29°02′29″N 81°17′00″W

Information
- Type: Public High School
- Motto: Rooted in tradition, destined for greatness.
- Established: 1922
- School district: Volusia County School District
- Principal: Michael Degirolmo
- Teaching staff: 131.00 (FTE)
- Enrollment: 2,936 (2024–2025)
- Student to teacher ratio: 22.41
- Colors: Green and gold
- Mascot: Bulldog
- Yearbook: The Athenian
- Website: www.delandhs.org

DeLand High School is a public high school in DeLand, Florida, established in 1922, with an enrollment of 3,616 students, a student/teacher ratio of 16.5, and a graduation rate above 90%.

== Special programs ==
=== International Baccalaureate ===
DeLand High School has been an International Baccalaureate high school since the 1990s. The program is a rigorous academic program that prepares its students for college with the development of an international outlook.

=== Engineering Academy ===
DeLand High School hosts an Engineering Program where students take specific courses to train in the Engineering field. This academy includes AP courses in physics, principles of technology, electrical and mechanical Engineering as well as a manufacturing-based engineering courses.

The Academy also emphasizes on math, science, computer, and communication skills while giving students experiences with problem solving, logical sequencing, presentation skills and organizational skills.

=== Construction Academy ===
DeLand High School built a brand new facility for the Construction Academy that opened for the 2007 school year. Students are able to learn the concepts of construction so they can go into the work field. The academy also provides an after school club open to all students who want to learn more about construction. This club, FCCMA (Future Carpenter and Cabinet Makers of America), strives to teach students the importance of teamwork and community service as well as carpentry, construction and proper safety precautions.

== Athletics ==
DeLand High School's athletic teams are known as the Bulldogs. The school colors are green and gold. The following varsity sports are offered at DeLand:

- Baseball (boys)
  - State champion – 1961
- Basketball (girls & boys)
  - Boys state champion – 1963
  - Girls state champion – 1984
- Bowling (girls & boys)
  - Boys state champion – 2003, 2004
  - Girls state champion – 2004, 2005, 2007
- Competitive cheer (girls)
- Cross country (girls & boys)
- Flag football (girls)
- Football (boys)
- Golf (girls & boys)
- Soccer (girls & boys)
- Softball (girls)
- Swimming and diving (girls & boys)
- Tennis (girls & boys)
- Track and field (girls & boys)
- Volleyball (girls)
- Weightlifting (boys)
  - State champion – 1975–1978, 1983, 1991, 1993, 2005
- Wrestling (boys)

== Controversies ==
On May 2, 1997, a DeLand High School teacher and coach, while teaching a class, pulled out a starting pistol and pointed it at a 15-year-old student after the boy talked back to him. The teacher was placed on leave. He resigned several weeks later. The State Attorney's Office decided not to file charges against the teacher, saying that the modified pistol does not fit the state's legal definition of a firearm. He was cleared to return to teaching a year after the incident.

In May 2002, 12 students super-glued stolen beehives within the school and also glued a large number of classroom and building doors shut. The school prank resulted in the release of a swarm of 80,000 bees. The students were suspended and later sentenced to perform community service. This prank was also the first to air on MTV's show High School Stories: Scandals, Pranks & Controversies, receiving an hour-long special.

== Notable alumni ==
- Terence Trent D'Arby, singer–songwriter, now known as Sananda Maitreya. Was a member of the chorus. (Class of 1979)
- Tra Thomas, former professional football player, offensive tackle for the Philadelphia Eagles. (Class of 1993)
- Vincent Martella, actor and singer. Known for his role as Greg Wuliger on Everybody Hates Chris, and for the voice of Phineas Flynn in Phineas and Ferb. (Class of 2011)
- Luke Scott, Major League Baseball, former outfielder and designated hitter.
- Craig Candeto American football coach and former college quarterback at the United States Naval Academy. (Class of 2000)
- Dominic Cianciarulo retired American soccer midfielder.
- Bridgette Gordon, member of the 1988 US Olympic gold medal women's basketball team. (Class of 1985)
- Nancy Benoit, former professional wrestling valet and wife of Chris Benoit. (Class of 1982)
- Gary Glover, Major League Baseball, former pitcher who last played for the Miami Marlins organization (Class of 1994)
- Mike Gillislee, former Running Back for the Florida Gators football team, and the National Football League
- Luke Weaver, Major League Baseball pitcher for the Arizona Diamondbacks. (Class of 2011)
- Jack C. Inman, member of the Florida House of Representatives.
- Nick Fortes, Major League Baseball Catcher for the Tampa Bay Rays. (Class of 2015)
