= Sterling Wescott =

American soccer player (born 1972)

Personal information
- Date of birth: January 30, 1972 (age 54)
- Place of birth: Aurora, Colorado, United States
- Height: 5 ft 4 in (1.63 m)
- Position: Midfielder

Youth career
- 1990–1994: Fresno State Bulldogs

Senior career*
Years	Team	Apps	(Gls)
1995	Hawaii Tsunami		
1995–1999	Wichita Wings (indoor)	142	(90)
1996	D.C. United	2	(0)
1996	Hampton Roads Mariners		
1997	Colorado Foxes	16	(4)
1999–2000	Utah Freezz (indoor)		
2000–2003	Utah Blitzz		
2004	St. Louis Strikers	9	(1)
2003–2006	St. Louis Steamers (indoor)	87	(47)

Managerial career
- 1994–1995: Clovis West High School
- 1997: Smoky Hill High School
- 2004: St. Louis Strikers
- * Club domestic league appearances and goals

Sterling Wescott (born January 30, 1972) is a retired U.S. soccer midfielder who played in the USISL, National Professional Soccer League, World Indoor Soccer League, Major Indoor Soccer League and two games with D.C. United in Major League Soccer. He has coached at the high school and professional levels.

== Youth ==
Wescott grew up in Aurora, Colorado, attending Smoky Hill High School where he was a four-year starter and three-time All State on the boys’ soccer team. He graduated from high school in the spring of 1990 and entered Fresno State University that fall. From 1990 to 1994, he played for the Fresno State Bulldogs soccer team. He graduated in 1995 with a bachelor's degree in physical education and teaching.

== Professional ==
In the summer of 1994, Wescott trained with F.C. Laufen, an amateur Swiss team. He turned professional in 1995 with the Hawaii Tsunami of the USISL. That fall, he signed with the Wichita Wings of the National Professional Soccer League (NPSL). He remained with the Wings through the 1998–1999 season. On February 7, 1996, D.C. United selected Wescott in the 14th round (140th overall) in the 1996 MLS Inaugural Player Draft. He played two games with United, then was placed on waivers on May 3, 1996. He then signed with the Hampton Roads Mariners of the USISL. In the summer of 1997, he played for the Colorado Foxes of the USISL A-League. From 1999 to 2000, Wescott played for the Utah Freezz in the World Indoor Soccer League. In 2001, he signed with the Utah Blitzz of the USISL, winning the 2001 championship. On July 23, 2003, the St. Louis Steamers of the Major Indoor Soccer League selected Wescott in the eighth round of the Expansion Draft. He played for the Steamers until the folded following the 2005–2006 seasons. In September 2006, the Chicago Storm selected Wescott in the fifth round of the 2006 MISL Dispersal Draft, but Wescott chose to retire and did not sign with the Storm.

== Coach ==
Wescott's coaching career began in 1993 when he joined the Clovis Soccer Club, a youth club in Clovis, California. In 1994, he became the head coach of the Clovis West High School soccer team. As he moved from team to team as a player, he would move to other clubs and high schools. In 1997, he was an assistant coach with Smoky Hill High School, his alma mater. In 1999, he entered the Olympic Development Program as a coach and evaluator, holding that position until 2003. In 2004, he spent one season as the head coach of the St. Louis Strikers in the fourth division Premier Development League. He is currently the Coaching Director for youth club Missouri Premier in St. Louis, Missouri.
