= Dominic Cianciarulo =

American soccer player

Personal information
- Date of birth: March 3, 1986 (age 40)
- Place of birth: DeLand, Florida, U.S.
- Height: 5 ft 9 in (1.75 m)
- Position: Midfielder

Youth career
- 2004–2007: Furman

Senior career*
Years	Team	Apps	(Gls)
2004–2005	Central Florida Kraze	8	(1)
2007	Carolina Dynamo	8	(0)
2008	Charleston Battery	15	(2)
- * Club domestic league appearances and goals

Dominic Cianciarulo (born March 3, 1986) is an American retired soccer midfielder.

Cianciarulo attended DeLand High School where he was an All State soccer player. He then attended Furman University, playing on the men's soccer team from 2004 to 2007. In 2005, he played the collegiate off season with the Central Florida Kraze in the fourth division Premier Development League and in 2007 with the Carolina Dynamo. On April 10, 2008, he signed with the Charleston Battery of the USL First Division.

== Honors ==
=== Central Florida Kraze ===
- USL Premier Development League Champions (1): 2004
