= Brian Plotkin =

US soccer player and coach

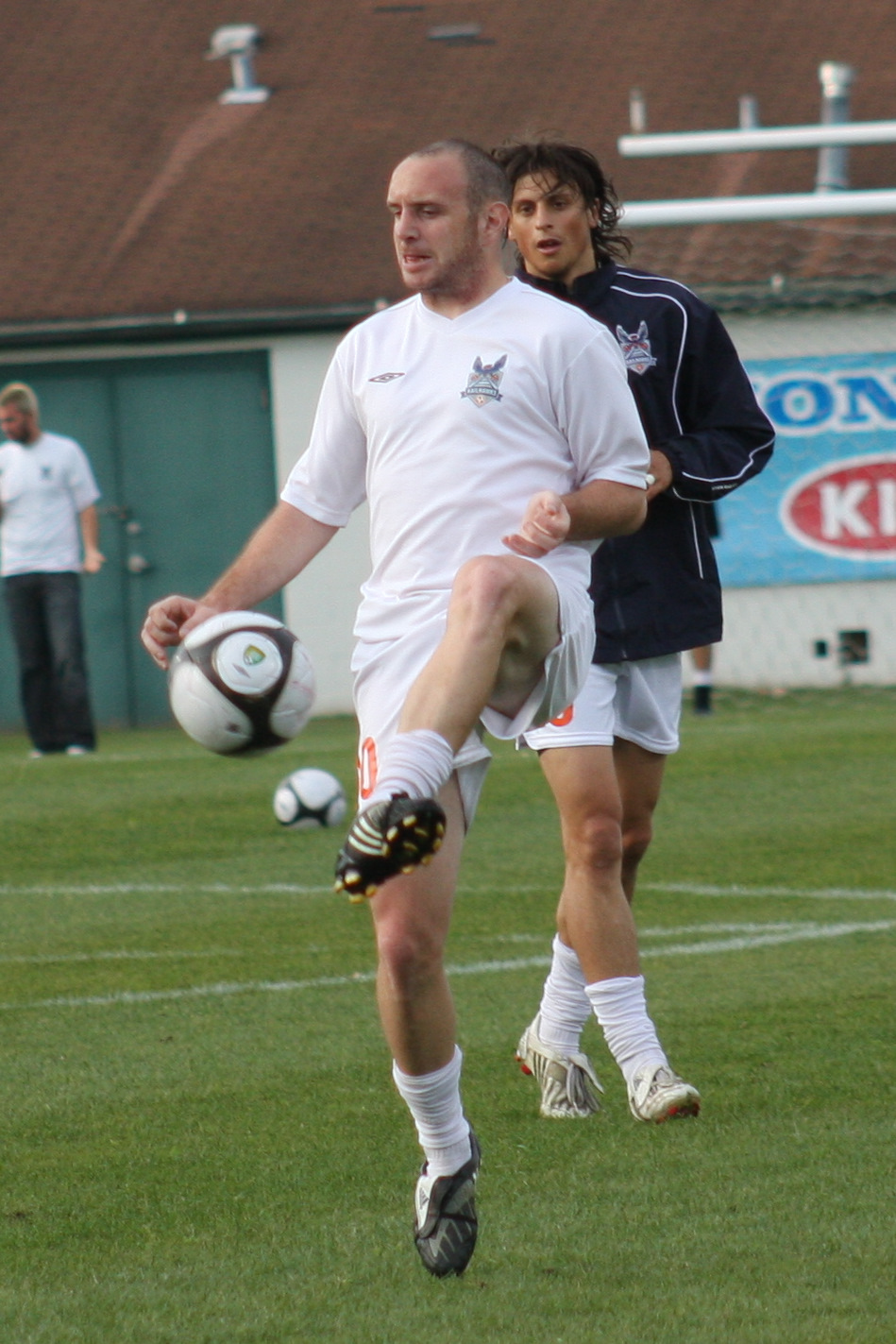

Personal information
- Full name: Brian Plotkin
- Date of birth: August 3, 1984 (age 42)
- Place of birth: Lisle, Illinois, United States
- Height: 5 ft 9 in (1.75 m)
- Position: Midfielder

Youth career
- 2002–2005: Indiana Hoosiers

Senior career*
Years	Team	Apps	(Gls)
2003	Chicago Fire Premier	7	(2)
2005	Indiana Invaders	1	(0)
2006–2008	Chicago Fire	23	(1)
2008	Columbus Crew	0	(0)
2009–2010	Carolina RailHawks	16	(2)

Managerial career
- 2013–2015: Loyola University (Chicago) (assistant)
- 2016–2018: Dartmouth (assistant)
- 2018–2021: Notre Dame (assistant)
- 2021–: Army
- * Club domestic league appearances and goals as of April 7, 2010

Brian Plotkin (born August 3, 1984, in Lisle, Illinois) is the head coach of the Army Black Knights men's soccer team and is a retired professional soccer player.

== Career ==
=== College and amateur ===
Brian Plotkin played college soccer for Indiana University from 2002 to 2005, featuring in 90 games and accumulating 24 goals and 36 assists. He was a member of National Championship winning teams in 2003 and 2004. He was the runner-up for the 2005 Hermann Trophy Award and was also named NSCAA First Team All-American and Big 10 Player of the Year. He also went on to gain First Team All Big Ten honors three consecutive years from 2003 to 2005, and an Academic All Big-Ten award in 2003. Plotkin played club soccer for the Chicago Sockers from the U12 to U19 levels and was a member of their U16 National Championship team in 2001. He was also named a Parade All-American and played at various times for US Youth National Teams at the U14, U16, U17 and U20 levels.

=== Professional ===
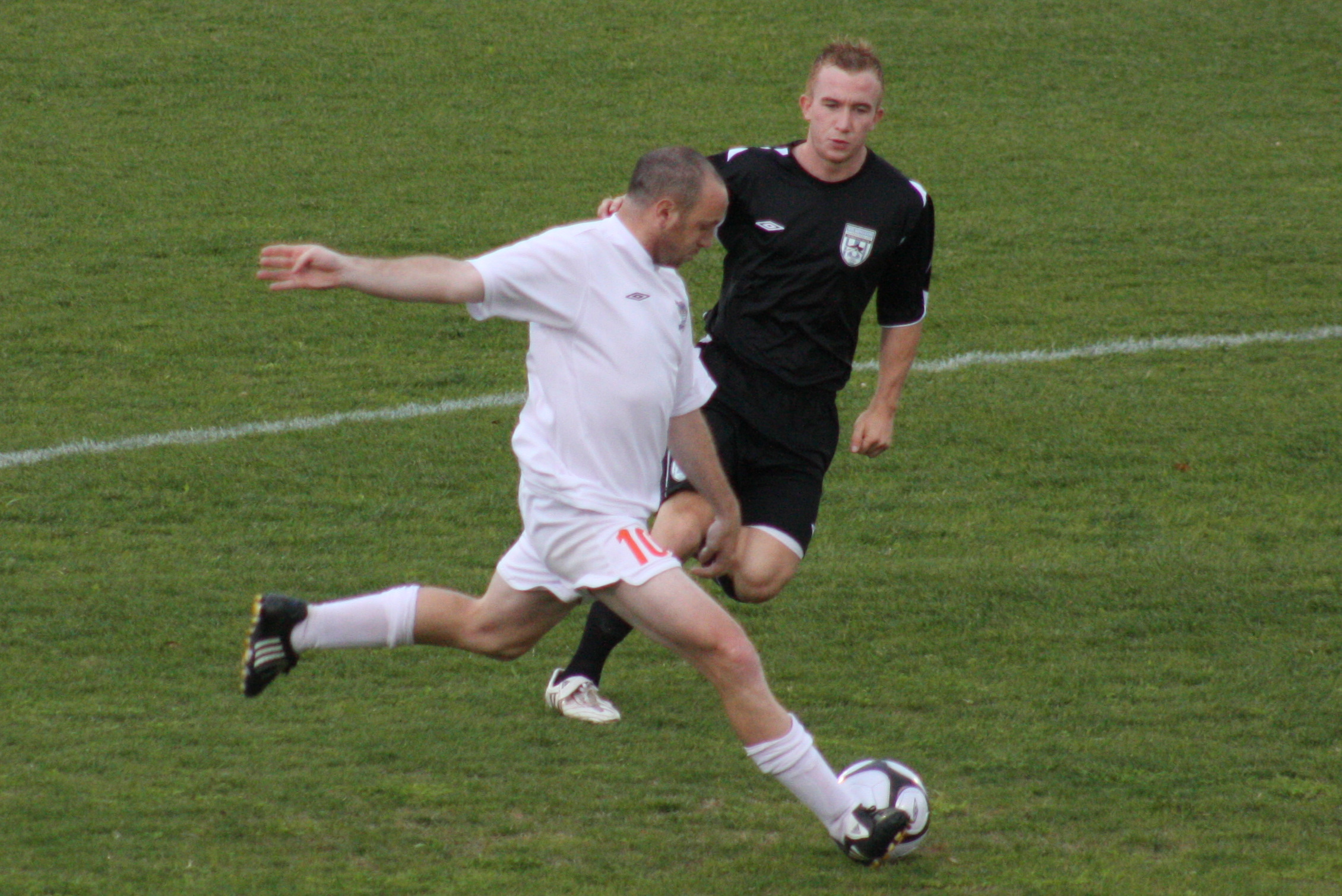
Plotkin pictured in 2009

Plotkin was selected in the second round 20th overall by the Chicago Fire in the 2006 MLS SuperDraft. During his time with the Chicago Fire, Plotkin won the 2006 US Open Cup and 2006 Chicago Fire educator of the Year. He featured in 23 first team and 14 reserve team games in his three seasons with the Fire. Columbus Crew then signed him in 2008 and was a member of the 2008 MLS Cup Championship Team.

In January 2009, Plotkin joined the Carolina RailHawks of the USL First Division.

In May 2010, Plotkin retired from professional soccer after a series of injuries.

=== Coaching ===
Plotkin began his college coaching career with Loyola University Chicago in 2013. The team's record improved in each of the three seasons that he was on staff. In his final season as Loyola in 2015, he helped Loyola lo two NCAA top rankings. The team conceded the fewest goals (8) in the entire country and also had the lowest Goals Against Average (.39). During his time at Loyola he helped develop multiple All-Missouri Valley selections as well was Freshman of the Year, Kyle Thomson (2013), Goalkeeper of the Year, Tim Dobrowolski (2014 and 2015) and Player of the Year, Eric Schoendorf (2015).

In January 2016, he was hired by Dartmouth College and in his first season at Dartmouth helped lead the team to a 9–5–5 record them to their 3rd consecutive Ivy League Tournament and NCAA Tournament berth. Dartmouth was selected with the All-Ivy Goalkeeper, James Hickok and Defensive Player of the Year, Wyatt Omsberg in addition to a total of 7 All-Ivy selections in 2016. Omsberg was also names as an NSCAA Second Team All-American. In 2017, Dartmouth won its 4th consecutive Ivy League Title and was awarded the #15 seed in the NCAA Tournament. Chad Riley was awarded Ivy League Coach of the Year, Wyatt Omsberg the Ivy League Defensive Player of the Year and Dawson McCartney the Ivy League Freshmen of the Year. Wyatt Omsberg was the first Ivy League player ever selected in the first round of the MLS SuperDraft and Matt Danilack with a fourth round selection of the Philadelphia Union.

In January 2018 Plotkin was hired as an assistant coach alongside Chad Riley at Notre Dame.

== Honors ==
=== Columbus Crew ===
- 2008 MLS Cup Champion

=== Chicago Fire ===
- 2006 US Open Cup Champion -
- 2006 Chicago Fire Educator of the Year

=== Indiana University ===
- NCAA Men's Division I Soccer Championship (2): 2003 2004
- 2005 Herrman Trophy Runner-Up -
- 2005 NSCAA 1st Team All-American -
- 2005 Big 10 Player of the Year
