= Ryan Stewart (footballer, born 1982) =

Trinidadian footballer (born 1982)

Personal information
- Full name: Ryan Stewart
- Date of birth: December 5, 1982 (age 43)
- Place of birth: Mayaro, Trinidad and Tobago
- Height: 5 ft 8 in (1.73 m)
- Positions: Midfielder; forward

College career
Years	Team	Apps	(Gls)
2004–2007	Lindsey Wilson Blue Raiders		

Senior career*
Years	Team	Apps	(Gls)
2007	Indiana Invaders	15	(4)
2008–2009	Cleveland City Stars	24	(2)
2010–	Caledonia AIA	0	(0)
- * Club domestic league appearances and goals as of 22 October 2009

Ryan Stewart (born December 5, 1982, in Mayaro) is a Trinidadian professional footballer, currently without a club.

== Career ==
=== College and amateur ===
Stewart attended Mayaro Composite High School in his native Trinidad before coming to the United States in 2003. He played college soccer at Lindsey Wilson College, where he was a three-time NAIA All-American selection in 2005, 2006, and 2007, a member of the NAIA National Championship squad as a sophomore in 2005, and the NAIA Region XI Player of the Year in 2007. Stewart completed his four-year career with 53 goals and 12 assists. He helped the Blue Raiders to the 2005 NAIA National Championship, and ranks fourth on the program's all-time goals scored list and fifth on the program's all-time points list with 118 points.

During his college years Stewart also played with the Indiana Invaders in the USL Premier Development League.

=== Professional ===
Stewart joined the Cleveland City Stars of the USL First Division in 2008.
