= Sasha Gotsmanov =

American-Belarusian soccer player (born 1982)

Personal information
- Full name: Alexander "Sasha" Gotsmanov
- Date of birth: September 19, 1982 (age 44)
- Place of birth: Minsk, Soviet Union
- Height: 6 ft 0 in (1.83 m)
- Position: Forward

College career
Years	Team	Apps	(Gls)
2001–2004	Rhode Island Rams		

Senior career*
Years	Team	Apps	(Gls)
2005–2006	Colorado Rapids	1	(0)
2006	→ Minnesota Thunder (loan)	6	(0)
2007	Minnesota Thunder	25	(0)
- * Club domestic league appearances and goals as of 15 February 2008

Sasha Gotsmanov (born September 19, 1982, in Minsk, Belarus) is an American-Belarusian soccer player, who spent one season in the MLS and two in the USL First Division.

Sasha was born into a soccer family. His father, Sergey Gotsmanov was a member of the Soviet Union national team that were runners-up for the 1988 European Football Championship. His mother, Olga, was the Belarusian national gymnastics coach. When Sasha was 15 his family moved from Belarus to Minnesota, so that Sergei could play for the Minnesota Thunder. Meanwhile, Sasha became a star player at the high school level.

In 2001, he enrolled under scholarship at the University of Rhode Island where he would play soccer for the next four years. During his time with Rhode Island he played in 82 games, scored 35 goals and assisted on 19. He was named Atlantic 10 Player of the Year in 2004.

On 8 April 2005 he signed with the Colorado Rapids as a developmental player. In 2005, he played most of the year with the Rapids Reserve team and was named the Reserves Most Valuable Player. He earned his lone MLS appearance on October 12 against Real Salt Lake. In the beginning of June 2006 he was loaned to the Minnesota Thunder but returned to the Rapids in July. At the end of the season, Gotsmanov was waived by the team. For the 2007 season, he signed up with the Thunder again, this time on a permanent deal.

He has a younger brother, Andrei, who played for the NSC Minnesota Stars.
