= Brandon Curran =

American soccer defender

Personal information
- Date of birth: October 13, 1980 (age 46)
- Place of birth: Papillion, Nebraska, United States
- Height: 6 ft 2 in (1.88 m)
- Position: Defender

Youth career
- 2001–2004: Umass Lowell

Senior career*
Years	Team	Apps	(Gls)
2002	Worcester Kings		
2003–2005	New Hampshire Phantoms	46	(3)
2006–2008	Charleston Battery	49	(1)
2008	→ Wilmington Hammerheads (loan)	5	(0)

Managerial career
- 2003–2005: UMass Lowell (assistant)
- * Club domestic league appearances and goals as of November 10, 2008

Brandon Curran (born October 13, 1980, in Papillion, Nebraska) is an American soccer defender, who currently plays for the Charleston Battery of the USL First Division.

Curran attended UMass Lowell, playing on the men's soccer team from 1999 to 2002. He was a 2002 second team All American and finished his career ranked seventh on the school's all-time points list. He graduated in 2003. He was inducted into the UMass Lowell Athletic Hall of Fame in 2008. Curran began playing for the Worcester Kings of the USL Professional Development League (PDL) in 2002 between his Junior and Senior year of college and then signed a professional contract with the New Hampshire Phantoms of the USL Second Division in 2003 at the end of his college career. In 2004, he played a handful of games on trial with the New England Revolution. In 2005, he was a second team All Star. In April 2006, Curran signed with the Charleston Battery of the USL First Division; started 32 games and completed the season as the player with the most minutes played. In 2008, he went on loan for five games with the Wilmington Hammerheads of the USL Second Division.

== Coach ==
In 2003, Curran became an assistant coach with UMass Lowell.
