= Allan Brown (soccer) =

South African-born Canadian soccer player

Personal information
- Full name: Allan Brown
- Date of birth: 21 December 1984 (age 41)
- Place of birth: Johannesburg, South Africa
- Height: 5 ft 11 in (1.80 m)
- Position: Defender

Youth career
- 2004–2007: Robert Morris Colonials

Senior career*
Years	Team	Apps	(Gls)
2008–2009	Pittsburgh Riverhounds	24	(0)
- * Club domestic league appearances and goals as of 11 October 2009

Allan Brown (born 21 December 1984 in Johannesburg) is a South African-born Canadian soccer player, currently without a club.

== Career ==
=== College and amateur ===
Allan moved from his native South Africa to Canada as a child, settling with his family in Newmarket, Ontario. He attended Sacred Heart Catholic High School, and subsequently played college soccer at Robert Morris University, where he majored in management and was an NEC All-Conference and Regional All-American performer.

=== Professional ===
Brown turned professional in 2008, playing with the Pittsburgh Riverhounds in the USL Second Division.

== Personal ==
Despite being born in South Africa, Brown is now a Canadian citizen.
