= Freddy Ruiz =

American soccer player

Personal information
- Full name: Freddy Ivan Ruiz
- Date of birth: November 11, 1993 (age 32)
- Place of birth: Rome, Georgia, United States
- Height: 1.80 m (5 ft 11 in)
- Position: Forward

College career
Years	Team	Apps	(Gls)
2012–2015	UAB Blazers	51	(29)

Senior career*
Years	Team	Apps	(Gls)
2014	Ocala Stampede	9	(2)
2015	Orlando City U-23	5	(0)
2016	Arizona United	3	(0)
- * Club domestic league appearances and goals as of March 28, 2016

Freddy Ivan Ruiz (born November 11, 1993) is an American soccer player.

== Career ==
=== College & Semi Professional ===
Ruiz played four years of college soccer at the University of Alabama at Birmingham between 2012 and 2015.

While at UAB, Ruiz appeared for Premier Development League clubs Ocala Stampede and Orlando City U-23.

=== Professional ===
Ruiz went undrafted in the 2016 MLS SuperDraft, later signing with United Soccer League side Arizona United on March 23, 2016.
