= Kenney Bertz =

American soccer player

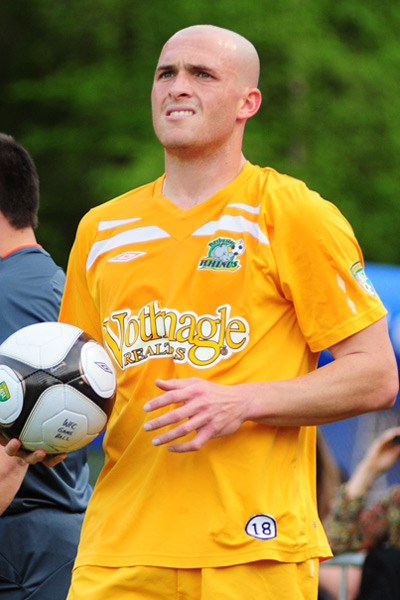

Personal information
- Full name: Kenneth Daniel Bertz
- Date of birth: December 7, 1983 (age 42)
- Place of birth: Fountain Valley, California, United States
- Height: 6 ft 2 in (1.88 m)
- Position: Defender

College career
Years	Team	Apps	(Gls)
2002–2005	Maryland Terrapins		

Senior career*
Years	Team	Apps	(Gls)
2003	Columbus Shooting Stars	4	(0)
2006–2007	Rochester Raging Rhinos	46	(2)
2008	SV Elversberg	5	(1)
2008–2009	Rochester Rhinos	34	(2)
Total		89	(5)
- * Club domestic league appearances and goals as of 21 October 2009

Kenney Bertz (born December 7, 1983, in Fountain Valley, California) is an American former soccer player. He spent the majority of his professional career in the United States with the Rochester Rhinos in the USL First Division.

== College and amateur soccer ==
Bertz attended the University of Maryland, College Park where he played on the men's soccer team from 2002 to 2005. His senior season, the Terrapins won the NCAA Men's Soccer Championship. In 2003, he also played for the Columbus Shooting Stars in the USL Premier Development League.

== Professional soccer ==
On January 20, 2006, D.C. United selected Bertz in the fourth round (47th overall) in the 2006 MLS SuperDraft. The Portland Timbers also selected him in the 2006 USL Draft. He elected to pursue a contract with United, but after failing in that effort, signed with the Rochester Rhinos of the USL First Division. In 2007, he acted as captain of the Rhinos for part of the season.

In January 2008, he signed with SV Elversberg of the German Regionalliga. On August 11, 2008, he rejoined the Rhinos, signing a two-year contract.

== Retirement ==
In December, 2009, Kenney announced through the Rochester Democrat & Chronicle and on the local talk radio show "Kick This" that he would be retiring from professional soccer to pursue a career in law enforcement. In September, 2010 Kenney began his training in law enforcement with the Butler Tech Police Academy. According to Kenney's LinkedIn profile, he joined the law firm as a legal assistant in January 2011.
