= Alistair Bain =

British association football manager

Personal information
- Date of birth: 14 October 1985 (age 41)
- Place of birth: Hamilton, Scotland

Team information
- Current team: Seacoast United Phantoms

Managerial career
- Years: Team
- 2010–2016: GPS Portland Phoenix
- 2016–2018: Seacoast United Phantoms

Alistair Bain is a football manager who in 2010 became the youngest head coach to hold a position in the men's US Soccer league pyramid.

== Youth coaching career ==
Bain began coaching within the Scottish Football Association development program, but moved on to hold youth team roles with Crystal Palace FC, Fulham FC, Watford FC, and Celtic FC.

== GPS Portland Phoenix ==
Bain was part of the management group who formed GPS Portland Phoenix in 2009, holding a General Manager position and Head Coach of the club's USL2 team. During his time with the Phoenix Bain presided over three league championship winning teams and created a culture of professional graduation within the playing staff. More than thirty players moved on from the club into the MLS, NASL and various leagues across Europe.

== Seacoast United Phantoms ==
In July 2016 Bain was appointed the head coach of the Seacoast United Phantoms USL2 team, a role that also saw him assume control of the club's youth academy who participate in the US Soccer Development Academy.

In his first season in charge of the Phantoms Bain lead the club to top spot in the North East conference, finishing the regular season with only one loss throughout the campaign. Bain then lead the Phantoms to the Eastern Conference semi-finals, losing out to eventual winners Charlotte Eagles. The Phantoms closed out the 2017 season having amassed their highest points total and highest goals scored tally in club history.

== Honours ==
GPS Portland Phoenix

- USL PDL Northeast Division: 2011, 2015, 2016

Seacoast United Phantoms

- USL PDL Northeast Division: 2017
