= Pierre Omanga =

French footballer (born 1988)

Pierre Adam Omanga
Personal information
- Date of birth: 10 April 1988 (age 38)
- Place of birth: Paris, France
- Height: 6 ft 2 in (1.88 m)
- Position: Forward

Youth career
- 2012: Montevallo Falcons
- 2013: Southern New Hampshire Penman

Senior career*
Years	Team	Apps	(Gls)
2013	GPS Portland Phoenix	13	(7)
2014	Rochester Rhinos	2	(0)
2015	FC Jazz	3	(0)
- * Club domestic league appearances and goals as of 19 May 2015

Pierre Adam Omanga (born 10 April 1988 in Paris, France) is a French footballer.

== Career ==
=== College and amateur ===
Omanga played college soccer at the University of Montevallo in 2012 and Southern New Hampshire University in 2013.

During his college years Omanga also played for GPS Portland Phoenix in the USL Premier Development League.

=== Professional ===
On 21 January 2014 Omanga was drafted in the third round (50th overall) of the 2014 MLS SuperDraft by New England Revolution.

Omanga signed with New England's USL Pro affiliate Rochester Rhinos in March 2014. He went on to make his professional debut on 3 August 2014 in a 0-0 draw with Orlando City.

In May 2015 Omanga was signed by the Finnish side FC Jazz.
