= Lafayette Swamp Cats =

- Full name: Lafayette Swamp Cats
- Nickname(s): The Swamp Cats
- Founded: 2000
- Dissolved: 2004
- Ground: Clark Field
- Manager: Sean Connor
- League: USL Premier Development League
- 2004: 6th, Mid South Division

Lafayette Swamp Cats were an American soccer team, founded in 2000. The team was a member of the United Soccer Leagues Premier Development League (PDL), the fourth tier of the American Soccer Pyramid, until 2004, when the team left the league and the franchise was terminated.

They were given "provisional status" in 2000, and played 12 exhibition games against other PDL sides, before joining the league full-time in 2001 as the Louisiana Outlaws, a name they kept until 2003, when they changed their name to the Swamp Cats.

The Swamp Cats played their home games at Clark Field in the city of Lafayette, Louisiana. The team's colors were red and yellow.

== Year-by-year ==
Year	Division	League	Regular season	Playoffs	Open Cup
2001	4	USL PDL	3rd, Mid-South	Did not qualify	Did not qualify
2002	4	USL PDL	5th, Mid-South	Did not qualify	Did not qualify
2003	4	USL PDL	7th, Mid-South	Did not qualify	Did not qualify
2004	4	USL PDL	6th, Mid-South	Did not qualify	Did not qualify

== Coaches ==
- (Northern Ireland) Sean Connor

== Stadia ==
- Clark Field, Lafayette, Louisiana 2003–04
