= Phil Tuttle =

American soccer player

Personal information
- Full name: Philip Tuttle
- Date of birth: October 19, 1987 (age 39)
- Place of birth: Hooksett, New Hampshire, United States
- Height: 6 ft 1 in (1.85 m)
- Position: Goalkeeper

Youth career
- 2006–2010: Notre Dame Fighting Irish

Senior career*
Years	Team	Apps	(Gls)
2008	Indiana Invaders	8	(0)
2009	New Hampshire Phantoms	2	(0)
2011	Harrisburg City Islanders	5	(0)
2013	Wilmington Hammerheads	14	(0)
- * Club domestic league appearances and goals as of April 18, 2014

Phil Tuttle (born October 19, 1987, in Hooksett, New Hampshire) is an American soccer player.

== Career ==
=== College and amateur ===
Tuttle is a product of the University of Notre Dame, where during his five years he appeared in 33 games, starting 29 and posted a 0.94 goals against average with nine shutouts. He ended his collegiate career with a 16-10-4 record and helped lead the Irish to the second round of the NCAA Tournament in 2008, 2009 and 2010.

During his college years, Tuttle also played in the USL Premier Development League for Indiana Invaders and New Hampshire Phantoms.

=== Professional ===
On January 18, 2011, Tuttle was drafted in the second round (33rd overall) in the 2011 MLS Supplemental Draft by San Jose Earthquakes, but was released by the club without signing. Tuttle signed his first professional contract with Harrisburg City Islanders on April 12, 2011.
