= Seacoast United Phantoms =

Seacoast United
- Full name: Seacoast United Soccer Club
- Nickname: Phantoms
- Founded: 1996; 30 years ago
- Stadium: Seacoast United Outdoor Complex; Epping, New Hampshire
- Owner: Jim De Deus
- Coach: Drou Goff
- League: USL League Two
- 2024: 1st, Northeast Division; Playoffs: League Champions
- Website: seacoastunited.com
Home colors

The Seacoast United Soccer Club (nicknamed the Phantoms) are an American soccer team based in Epping, New Hampshire. The team was originally based in Manchester, New Hampshire, before moving to Portsmouth, New Hampshire, where it played from 2011 to 2017, in the stadium of Portsmouth High School. Founded in 1996, the team plays in USL League Two, the fourth tier of the American soccer pyramid. The team's colors are blue and white.

== History ==
=== USISL Pro League/USISL D-3 Pro League ===
New Hampshire Phantoms joined the ranks of American pro soccer in 1996 as an expansion franchise in the third-tier USISL Pro League. They finished their first season in competition with a decent 8–7–1 record, in 6th place in the Northeast Conference behind Central Jersey Riptide, but out of the playoffs. They improved to a 9–5–4 record in 1997 and finished third in the Northeast behind North Jersey Imperials, and qualified for the post-season for the first time. Their run through the playoffs was impressive: they took out divisional rivals Rhode Island Stingrays 2–1 in overtime in the divisional semi finals, and then beat Central Jersey Riptide 2–0 to progress to the national tournament. The Phantoms squeaked past Mid-Atlantic division side Baltimore Bays 1–0 in overtime in the quarter-finals, and were just one win away from the Championship Game, but lost 2–1 in overtime to eventual champions Albuquerque Geckos in the semi-finals. Ron Murphy was the Phantoms' top scorer in a very successful year, with 19 goals, the fourth best in the league.

Things were even better for the Phantoms in 1998, as they improved their regular season performance for the second straight year, finishing with a 10–6–2 records and 2nd in the Northeast behind Rhode Island Stingrays. Their '98 playoff run was even more impressive than the previous year's: they beat Western Mass Pioneers 2–1 in overtime in the divisional semi final, and qualified for the national tournament for the second time with a dogged 3–2 win over Rhode Island in the divisional final. The Phantoms downed Central Jersey Riptide 3–0 in the quarter-finals, and then overcame South Central Division champions Austin Lone Stars 2–1 in overtime in the semis. New Hampshire faced the Chicago Stingers in the Championship Game, but fell 3–2 in another overtime classic, and eventually finished the year as the second-best team in the D3 Pro League. In the post-season awards, goalkeeper Jeremy Bailey was honored as one of the top stoppers in the league, with an impressive 1.09 GAA average.

=== USL D-3 Pro League ===
1999 cemented New Hampshire's position as perennial contenders: they finished third in the re-structured Northern Division behind Western Mass Pioneers with a 13–5–0 record, and beat New Jersey Stallions 1–0 in the conference playoff semi-finals, but failed to progress to the national competition for a third straight year as they were beaten 1–0 in overtime by Western Mass in the Conference Final. Ron Murphy was again the Phantoms' top scorer, with 15 goals, while Andrew Boyea posted encouraging 1.27 GAA goalkeeping stats.

The Phantoms made the post season for a fourth time in 2000, finishing third behind the New Jersey Stallions in the regular season table, but fell at the first hurdle in the playoffs, losing 3–2 to Reading Rage first time out. 2001 was much of the same: second in the regular season behind the expansion Boston Bulldogs with an 8–8–2 record, but out in the first round of the playoffs following a 4–2 loss to their divisional rivals, the New Jersey Stallions, although Ron Murphy continued to be a potent goal scoring force for the Phantoms, with 17 goals on the season. 2002 was the first year that things did not go the Phantoms' way, as they finished the year bottom of the Northern Conference table with just four wins all season, and out of the playoffs for the first time in four years.

=== USL Pro Select League ===
The D3 Pro League became the Pro Select League in 2003, and the Phantoms bounced back superbly in regular season play, finishing second in the Northern Region behind Westchester Flames with a hugely encouraging 11–7–2 record, before falling to the Flames 5–3 on aggregate in the first round of the playoffs. 2003 also saw New Hampshire's first foray into the US Open Cup, but their stay in the competition was marked by controversy: they originally beat USASA team Bridgeport Italians 3–0 in the second round; however, the team the Italians beat in the first round – PDL outfit Chesapeake Dragons – protested the result of the first-round game, due to the Italians fielding an ineligible player, and as a result the Italians were disqualified from the competition. This meant that New Hampshire had to play a *second* second-round game, this time against Chesapeake. Fortunately, the Phantoms won the game 3–2 with a golden goal from Ebbie Kodiat, and progressed to the third round – where they were unceremoniously dumped out of the competition 4–1 by A-League side Rochester Raging Rhinos. Bjørn Hansen was New Hampshire's top scorer, with 17 goals, the fourth best figures in the league.

2004 brought the first piece of silverware to New Hampshire when, after eight years of competition, they topped the Northern Division standings, four points clear of second placed Westchester Flames. The Phantoms got a bye to the Pro Soccer League playoff semi finals, and were well-placed to make their second trip to the Championship game, but were unexpectedly beaten 1–0 by Southern Division winners Charlotte Eagles, and went home early. The Phantoms also made their second trip to the US Open Cup in '04, but unexpectedly lost 5–1 to PDL team Chicago Fire Reserves in the second round. Bjørn Hansen was again New Hampshire's top scorer, with 16 goals on the season, while Kyle Singer posted 1.223 GAA goalkeeping stats.

=== USL Second Division ===
The USL Pro Select League was renamed the USL Second Division in 2005, and converted to a single-table format, but the Phantoms never got to grips with the new setup, and struggled on the field. The Phantoms lost five of their six opening games, conceding three goals in four of the games, and were grasping for any kind of run in form almost from the beginning of the season. A 6–0 hammering of the Northern Virginia Royals at home in early June that featured a brace from striker Mark Manganello briefly raised the spirits, and back-to-back wins over Long Island Rough Riders and Charlotte Eagles hinted that a late-season surge could be on the cards in Manchester, but the Phantoms reverted to their poor form quickly. A win and three ties in July effectively ended their playoff hopes, and the 5–2 defeat on the road at Long Island was the low point of the year. A final day victory over the Rough Riders made up for their pummeling earlier in the season, but it was too little too late for New Hampshire, who ended the season in 7th place, 22 points behind regular season champions Western Mass Pioneers. Bjørn Hansen and Thomas McNeil shared the goal scoring spoils, with 6 goals each, while Ricky Charles, Hansen and James Proctor weighed in with 3 assists apiece.

2006 was a year of mid-table obscurity for the Phantoms, finishing with a 9–10–1 record, and in 5th place in the USL Second Division standings, just missing out on the post season once more. The year started brightly for New Hampshire, with two wins and a tie in their first three games, including 3–1 victory over Long Island Rough Riders. The Phantoms were quite excellent at home, losing just two games in front of their own fans all season. Defender Narciso Fernandes scored twice in their 3–1 win over Western Mass Pioneers in mid-July, and Almir Barbosa hit a hat trick against the Cincinnati Kings in their 3–1 win in early August. The Phantoms even enjoyed a brief run to the third round of the US Open Cup, taking out Connecticut-based USASA side Milford International before being walloped 5–1 by USL First Division outfit Rochester Raging Rhinos. Unfortunately, the Phantoms' form on the road was abysmal, with eight straight road losses away from home stretching from early June through to the edge of the season. They also suffered some humiliating defeats during this stretch: Western Mass Pioneers hit them for six in mid-July, and put another half dozen past them in a 6–2 win in August. The Harrisburg City Islanders hit four in a bad-tempered game which saw three men sent off in injury time, and the Richmond Kickers showed no mercy to goalkeeper T.J. Tomasso when completing an 8–0 rout on the final day of the season. Almir Barbosa was the Phantoms' top scorer, with 10 goals, while Thomas McNeil contributed 5 assists.

The Phantoms sank to their lowest ebb in 2007, winning just three games in what turned out to be a long and difficult season. They started the season with a 7-game winless streak, being hammered 4–0 by both the Richmond Kickers and the Cincinnati Kings, and conceding an injury time goal to Cleveland City Stars in their 3–2 defeat there, before eventually winning their first game of the season, 1–0 over Western Mass Pioneers in early June. Due to stadium issues, the Phantoms were forced to play 10 of their first 14 games on the road, prior to embarking on a 6-game home stand to finish the season. The Phantoms did manage to pick up two more wins – 2–1 over Richmond Kickers and a hard-fought 3–2 over Wilmington Hammerheads – but were eliminated from playoff contention well before their 3–1 loss to Cincinnati on the final day of the season. They eventually finished the year 9th of 10 in the standings, just one point ahead of rock-bottom Bermuda Hogges, to whom they lost twice. Almir Barbosa was New Hampshire's top scorer for the second year in a row, with 6 goals, while Thomas McNeil contributed 2 assists.

In an attempt to consolidate their finances and restructure their organization, the Phantoms took voluntary relegation from the USL Second Division to the Premier Development League at the end of 2007.

=== USL Premier Development League ===
In 2011 the club moved to Portsmouth, NH, merged with Seacoast United Soccer Club, and become known as the Seacoast United Phantoms. The club's transition into the PDL began with an inconsistent run of performances, however after winning their division and reaching the regional finals in 2014 the Phantoms established themselves as a force within the North East Division. In 2016 they appointed Alistair Bain as their new head coach, who arrives from GPS Portland Phoenix having had a very successful 7-year tenure in charge. In 2017 they won the regular season of their division.

=== USL League Two ===
In 2019, the club moved to the newly created USL League Two, the fourth division of American soccer. In their inaugural season, they finished 6th in the Northeast division, and missed out on the playoffs.

== Current roster ==
As of May 31, 2026

Note: Flags indicate national team as defined under FIFA eligibility rules; some limited exceptions apply. Players may hold more than one non-FIFA nationality.

No.	Pos.	Nation	Player
0	GK	USA	David Skorodumov
1	GK	USA	Aden Deyamin
2	DF	USA	Reed Cash
4	MF	USA	Nicolas Juliano
6	MF	CAN	Ethan Kang
7	MF	USA	Aidan Sheppela
8	MF	USA	Emmett Shea
9	FW	USA	Elias Novina
11	FW	ENG	Louis Crofts
12	MF	USA	Danny Dokov
13	MF	USA	Cedrick Isho
14	FW	USA	Eduard Fandunyan
15	DF	USA	William Wagner
16	DF	USA	Brady Lewis

No.	Pos.	Nation	Player
18	MF	ARG	Alejo Cáceres
19	MF	IRL	Jack Kehoe
21	MF	USA	Nicholas Juliano
23	DF	CYP	Sergios Feneridis
24	DF	ARG	Ignacio Arribere
26	DF	USA	Quinn Philips
27	MF	USA	Myles Culley
28	DF	GER	Luc Haller
29	MF	USA	Nicholas Bourne
30	GK	USA	Brady Elmblad
31	MF	USA	John Labelle
32	MF	USA	Gavin Díaz
35	MF	USA	Tyler Kraft
—	GK	USA	Cameron Hall

== Academy players ==
Note: Flags indicate national team as defined under FIFA eligibility rules; some limited exceptions apply. Players may hold more than one non-FIFA nationality.

No.	Pos.	Nation	Player
22	DF	USA	Lincoln Cross

== Notable former players ==
This list of notable former players comprises players who went on to play professional soccer after playing for the team in the Premier Development League, or those who previously played professionally before joining the team.

- (United States) Chris Banks
- (Canada) Moise Bombito
- (Philippines) Henry Brauner
- (Barbados) Romelle Burgess
- (United States) Preston Burpo
- (Grenada) Ricky Charles
- (United States) Jim Cherneski
- (Republic of Ireland) Joseph Clancy
- (United States) Brandon Curran
- (United States) Adrian Dubois
- (United States) Miguel Gonzalez
- (Bermuda) Andrew Kempe
- (United States) Neil Krause
- (United States) Jeff Larentowicz
- (Australia) Jackson Lee (soccer)
- (United States) Brian Levey
- (United States) Chris Loftus
- (United States) Gabriel Mercier
- (United States) Tim Murray
- (United States) Benjamin Secord
- (United States) Charlie Sharp
- (United States) Dushawne Simpson
- (United States) Kyle Singer
- (Portugal) Val Teixeira
- (United States) T. J. Tomasso
- (United States) Phil Tuttle
- (United States) Luke Vercollone
- (United States) Travis Worra

== Year-by-year ==
Year	Level	League	Regular season	Playoffs	U.S. Open Cup
New Hampshire Phantoms
1996	3	USISL Pro League	6th, Northeast	did not qualify	did not qualify
1997	3	USISL D-3 Pro League	3rd, Northeast	Semifinals	did not qualify
1998	3	USISL D-3 Pro League	2nd, Northeast	Final	did not qualify
1999	3	USL D-3 Pro League	3rd, Northern	Conference Finals	did not qualify
2000	3	USL D-3 Pro League	3rd, Northern	Conference Quarterfinals	did not qualify
2001	3	USL D-3 Pro League	2nd, Northern	Conference Semifinals	did not qualify
2002	3	USL D-3 Pro League	4th, Northern	did not qualify	did not qualify
2003	3	USL Pro Select League	2nd, Northern	Regional Finals	3rd round
2004	3	USL Pro Soccer League	1st, Northern	Semifinals	2nd round
2005	3	USL Second Division	8th	did not qualify	did not qualify
2006	3	USL Second Division	5th	did not qualify	3rd round
2007	3	USL Second Division	9th	did not qualify	did not qualify
2008	4	USL PDL	4th, New England	did not qualify	did not qualify
2009	4	USL PDL	8th, Northeast	did not qualify	did not qualify
2010	4	USL PDL	7th, Northeast	did not qualify	did not qualify
2011	4	USL PDL	2nd, Northeast	Conference Semifinals	did not qualify
Seacoast United Phantoms
2012	4	USL PDL	6th, Northeast	did not qualify	did not qualify
2013	4	USL PDL	7th, Northeast	did not qualify	did not qualify
2014	4	USL PDL	1st, Northeast	Conference Semifinals	did not qualify
2015	4	USL PDL	2nd, Northeast	Divisional Playoff	2nd round
2016	4	USL PDL	5th, Northeast	did not qualify	1st round
2017	4	USL PDL	1st, Northeast	Conference Semifinals	did not qualify
2018	4	USL PDL	7th, Northeast	did not qualify	2nd round
2019	4	USL League Two	6th, Northeast	did not qualify	did not qualify
2020	4	USL League Two	Season cancelled due to COVID-19 pandemic		
2021	4	USL League Two	3rd, Northeast	Conference Semifinals	did not qualify
2022	4	USL League Two	1st, Northeast	Conference Final	did not qualify
2023	4	USL League Two	1st, Northeast	Conference Quarterfinals	did not qualify
2024	4	USL League Two	1st, Northeast	Champions	did not qualify
2025	4	USL League Two	6th, Northeast	did not quality	did not quality
2026	4	USL League Two	7th, Northeast	did not quality	did not quality

== Honors ==
- USL Premier Development League / USL League Two
  - Playoff Champions: 2024
  - Eastern Conference Champions: 2024
  - Northeast Division Champions: 2014, 2017, 2022, 2023, 2024
- USL Pro Select League
  - Northern Division Champions: 2004
- Hank Steinbrecher Cup
  - Vice-Champions: 2025

== Head coaches ==
- (United States) Sean Carey (2006–2009)
- (United States) Stefano Franciosa (2010)
- (United States) Alistair Bain (2016–2018)
- (United Kingdom) Alex Ryan (2020–2024)
- (United States) Josh Taylor (2025)
- (United States) Drou Goff (2026)

== Stadiums ==
- Singer Family Park; Manchester, New Hampshire (2003)
- Stadium at Souhegan High School; Amherst, New Hampshire, 3 games (2003, 2005–2006)
- Owl Stadium; Keene, New Hampshire, 3 games (2003, 2006)
- Stadium at Manchester West High School; Manchester, New Hampshire (2004)
- Stadium at Southern New Hampshire University; Manchester, New Hampshire (2005, 2009–2010)
- Veterans Memorial Stadium; Lawrence, Massachusetts (2006)
- Clement Lemire Stadium; Manchester, New Hampshire (2007–2008)
- Stadium at Portsmouth High School; Portsmouth, New Hampshire (2011–2022)
- Stadium at New England Sports Park; Amesbury, Massachusetts (2022)
- Seacoast United Outdoor Complex (2023); Epping, New Hampshire

== Average attendance ==
Attendance stats are calculated by averaging each team's self-reported home attendances from the historical match archive at https://web.archive.org/web/20100105175057/http://www.uslsoccer.com/history/index_E.html.

- 1996: 867
- 1997: 1,419 Playoffs: 2,727 Overall: 1,583
- 1998: 1,236 Playoffs: 2,094 or 2,593 Overall: 1,358
- 1999: 1,156 Playoffs: NA
- 2000: 1,845 Playoffs: NA
- 2001: 1,541
- 2002: 985
- 2003: 675 Playoffs: NA
- 2004: 768
- 2005: 594
- 2006: 1,027
- 2007: 899
- 2008: 2,901
- 2009: 434
- 2010: 106
- 2011: 275
- 2012: 198
- 2013: 83
- 2014: 171
