= Mo Oduor =

Kenyan footballer (born 1978)

Mo Oduor aka Moffat Ongwena
Personal information
- Full name: Moffat Oduor aka Moffat Ongwena
- Date of birth: January 25, 1978 (age 48)
- Place of birth: Eldoret, Kenya
- Height: 6 ft 1 in (1.85 m)
- Position: Midfielder

Youth career
- 1998–1999: Charleston Golden Eagles
- 2000–2001: Furman Paladins

Senior career*
Years	Team	Apps	(Gls)
2002	Carolina Dynamo	11	(2)
2002–2003	Long Island Rough Riders	5	(0)
2004–2011	Harrisburg City Islanders	86	(13)

International career
1997	Kenya U-20		
- * Club domestic league appearances and goals as of 11 October 2009

Moffat "Mo" Oduor, a.k.a. Moffat Ongwena (born January 25, 1978, in Eldoret) is a former Kenyan soccer player who previously played for Harrisburg City Islanders in the USL Second Division. Now Mo works as a coach for youth soccer. He coaches SCPASA a youth club in South-Central Pennsylvania.

== Career ==
=== College ===
Oduor came to the United States from his native Kenya in 1998 to attend and play college soccer at the University of Charleston, where he earned All-American honors as a sophomore, before transferring to Furman University for his junior and senior years, where he was a college teammate of former US national team member Clint Dempsey.

=== Professional ===
Odour turned professional in 2002 with Carolina Dynamo of the USL. In 2003, he played for the Long Island Rough Riders., before transferring to the Harrisburg City Islanders in 2004.

Oduor has played over 80 games for the Islanders since then, and was part of the Harrisburg team which won the 2007 USL Second Division championship. He garnered All league selection and was named to the USL team of the decade.
