= St. Louis Strikers =

American soccer team

- Full name: St. Louis Strikers
- Nickname: The Strikers
- Founded: 2003
- Dissolved: 2004
- Ground: St. Louis Soccer Park, St. Louis, Missouri
- Capacity: 5,000
- Manager: Sterling Wescott
- League: USL Premier Development League
- 2004: 5th, Heartland Division

St. Louis Strikers were an American soccer team, founded in 2003, and was a member of the United Soccer Leagues Premier Development League (PDL), the fourth tier of the American Soccer Pyramid, until 2004, when the team left the league and the franchise was terminated.

The Strikers played their home games at the St. Louis Soccer Park in the city of St. Louis, Missouri, and also at the Cooper Sports Complex in Springfield, Missouri, some 216 miles away. The team's colors were green and white.

== Year-by-year ==
Year	Division	League	Reg. season	Playoffs	Open Cup
2003	4	USL PDL	5th, Heartland	Did not qualify	Did not qualify
2004	4	USL PDL	5th, Heartland	Did not qualify	Did not qualify

== Coaches ==
- Sterling Wescott 2004

== Stadiums ==
- Sportport Soccer Complex, St. Louis, Missouri 2003
- St. Louis Soccer Park, St. Louis, Missouri 2004
- Cooper Sports Complex, Springfield, Missouri 2004
