= Florent Raimy =

Beninese footballer (born 1986)

Personal information
- Date of birth: February 7, 1986 (age 40)
- Place of birth: Laon, France
- Height: 1.84 m (6 ft 0 in)
- Position: Midfielder

Senior career*
| Years | Team | Apps | (Gls) |
| 2004–2006 | Sedan | | |
| 2006 | Virton | 4 | (0) |
| 2007 | Cincinnati Kings | 11 | (0) |
| 2007–2008 | FC Oberneuland | 1 | (0) |
| 2008–2009 | FCM Bacău | 34 | (2) |
| 2009–2010 | Marsaxlokk | 28 | (6) |
| 2010–2010 | Omonia Aradippou | 5 | (0) |
| 2011–2012 | Marsaxlokk | 23 | (2) |
| 2012 | Mosta | 14 | (1) |

International career
| 2005 | Benin | 1 | (0) |
- * Club domestic league appearances and goals

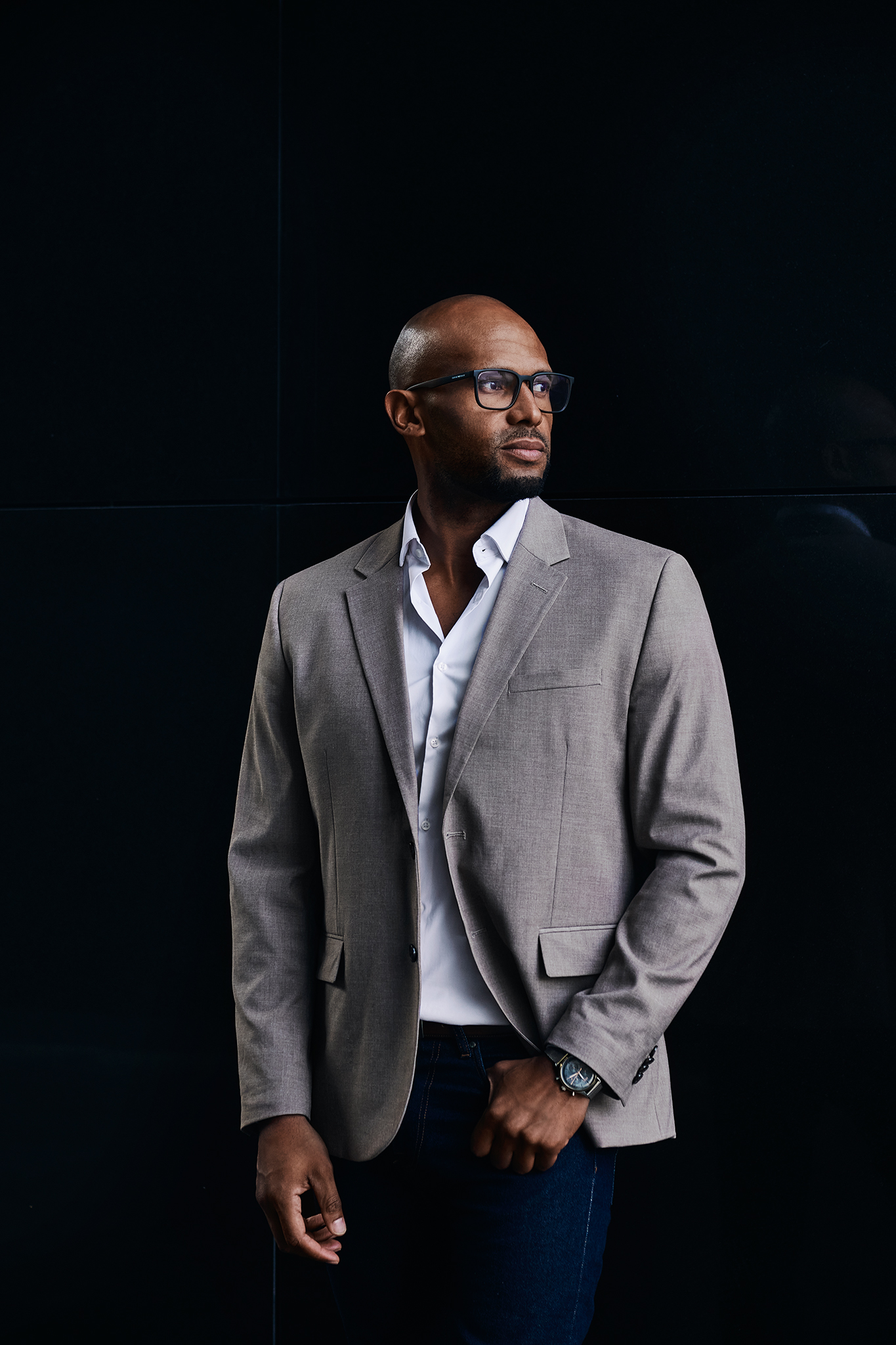
Florent Raimy

Florent Raimy (born 7 February 1986) is a French–Beninese former international professional footballer who played as a midfielder. Following a back injury, he retired from professional football and transitioned into financial services.

In 2022, Raimy founded the international matchmaking and relationship consultancy Edwige International, through which he assists clients worldwide in forming long-term, values-based relationships.

== International football career ==
Raimy played in the 2005 FIFA World Youth Championship. He also got the bronze medal during the 2005 African Youth Championship.

== Honours ==
Marsaxlokk

- Maltese First Division: 2009–10
- 3rd 2005 African Youth Championship.
