= Kwame Sarkodie =

American soccer player (born 1985)

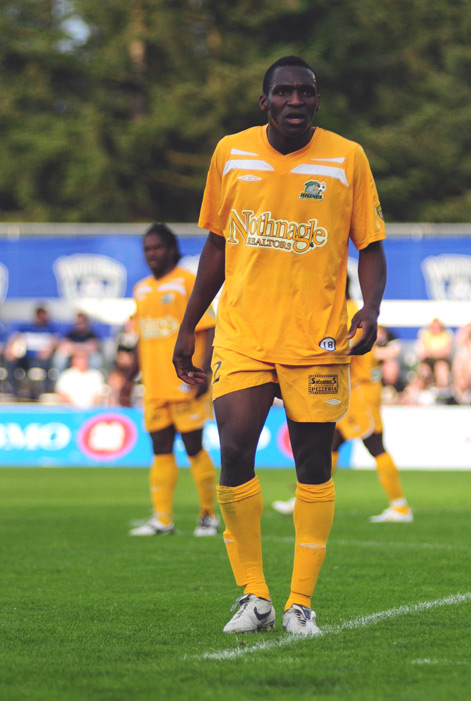

Personal information
- Date of birth: April 27, 1985 (age 41)
- Place of birth: Dayton, Ohio, USA
- Height: 5 ft 11 in (1.80 m)
- Positions: Defender; midfielder

College career
Years	Team	Apps	(Gls)
2003–2006	Cincinnati Bearcats		

Senior career*
Years	Team	Apps	(Gls)
2006	Indiana Invaders	8	(1)
2007	Cincinnati Kings	14	(3)
2008	Cleveland City Stars	5	(0)
2008	Colorado Rapids	0	(0)
2009	Rochester Rhinos	24	(1)
2010–2013	Cincinnati Kings (indoor)	43	(42)
2013–2014	Cincinnati Saints (indoor)	9	(10)
- * Club domestic league appearances and goals

Kwame Sarkodie (born April 27, 1985) is an American former professional soccer player.

== Career ==
=== College and amateur ===
Born in Dayton, Ohio, Sarkodie played college soccer at the University of Cincinnati. While at college Sarkodie also played in the USL Premier Development League for the Indiana Invaders and the Cincinnati Kings.

=== Professional ===
Sarkodie signed his first professional contract in 2008, playing for the Cleveland City Stars in the USL Second Division, and helping them to the USL-2 championship. Following the title game, Sarkodie played two games for the Colorado Rapids reserve team, and signed a brief professional contract to play with the team during the playoffs, but he never made a senior appearance for the team and was waived on March 3, 2009.

On March 26, 2009, the Rochester Rhinos announced the signing of Sarkodie to a one-year contract.

== Personal life ==
Sarkodie's parents are from Ghana. He has two younger brothers who also played soccer at the collegiate level: Ofori Sarkodie at Indiana University and Kofi Sarkodie who's with Houston Dynamo.
