= Jeremy Tolleson =

American retired defender (born 1982)

Personal information
- Date of birth: April 30, 1982 (age 44)
- Place of birth: Atlanta, Georgia, United States
- Height: 1.75 m (5 ft 9 in)
- Position: Defender

Youth career
- 2001–2004: Wheaton Thunder

Senior career*
Years	Team	Apps	(Gls)
2004–2005	Cascade Surge	30	(0)
2007–2008	Cleveland City Stars	39	(0)
2009	Carolina RailHawks	25	(0)
2009	→ Richmond Kickers (loan)	1	(0)

Managerial career
- 2007–2009: Gordon College (assistant)
- * Club domestic league appearances and goals

Jeremy Tolleson is an American retired defender and now teacher, who played professionally in the United Soccer Leagues.

== Player ==
Tolleson attended Wheaton College, where he played on the men's NCAA Division III college soccer team from 2001 to 2004, and was the 2004 College Conference of Illinois and Wisconsin Player of the Year.

During his college years Tolleson also played two seasons for the Cascade Surge in the USL Premier Development League, where he was named to the 2004 All Western Conference team.

Tolleson signed with the Cleveland City Stars in the USL Second Division on January 7, 2007. He led the team in minutes played in 2008, helping the Stars win the USL-2 championship. On February 13, 2009, he signed with the Carolina RailHawks of the USL First Division. He was the team defender of the year and also went on loan to the Richmond Kickers for one game. In February 2010, Tolleson retired to become a missionary in Honduras.

== Coach ==
From 2007 to 2009, Tolleson served as an assistant coach with the Gordon College men's soccer team.
