= Kevin Taylor (soccer) =

American soccer player (born 1982)

Personal information
- Full name: Kevin Taylor
- Date of birth: November 4, 1982 (age 43)
- Place of birth: Miami, Florida, United States
- Height: 6 ft 5 in (1.96 m)
- Position: Defender

Youth career
- 2000–2003: Michigan Wolverines

Senior career*
Years	Team	Apps	(Gls)
2002–2005	Michigan Bucks	56	(13)
2005–2006	Rochester Raging Rhinos	4	(0)
2007–2008	Minnesota Thunder	40	(2)
2009–?	Michigan Bucks	12	(1)
2013–?	Detroit City FC	2	(1)
2017	AFC Ann Arbor		
- * Club domestic league appearances and goals as of 18 May 2013

Kevin Taylor (born November 4, 1982) is an American soccer player who most recently played for AFC Ann Arbor in the National Premier Soccer League.

== Career ==
=== College and amateur ===
Taylor grew up in Miami, Florida, where he was a 1997 and 1998 All State and 2000 second team All American soccer player at Gulliver Preparatory School. He played college soccer at the University of Michigan from 2000 to 2003., and spent the 2003 collegiate off-season with the Michigan Bucks of the USL Premier Development League.

Taylor was drafted in the third round (25th fifth overall) of the 2004 MLS SuperDraft by the Colorado Rapids, but he was not offered a contract by the team, and he returned to play for Bucks for the 2004 and 2005 PDL seasons. In 2005, he was named the PDL Defender of the Year.

=== Professional ===
Following the Bucks’ elimination from the 2005 PDL playoffs, Taylor signed with the Rochester Rhinos of the USL First Division. He played one game with the Rhinos in 2004 and then three games in 2005. On March 30, 2007, he signed a one-year contract with an option for a second year with the Minnesota Thunder of the USL First Division.

After being released by the Thunder in February 2009, Taylor re-signed with the Michigan Bucks.

In 2013, Taylor signed with Detroit City, and scored on a penalty kick in his second game.
