= Chris Spendlove =

English footballer (born 1984)

Personal information
- Full name: Christopher Spendlove
- Date of birth: 18 December 1984 (age 41)
- Place of birth: Liverpool, England
- Height: 1.78 m (5 ft 10 in)
- Position: Defender

Youth career
- Everton
- Preston North End

College career
Years	Team	Apps	(Gls)
2007–2010	Oklahoma City Stars	83	(26)

Senior career*
Years	Team	Apps	(Gls)
2006–2007	St. Helens Town		
2008–2009	Austin Aztex U23	15	(1)
2010	GPS Portland Phoenix	14	(1)
2011	Wilmington Hammerheads	21	(0)
2013	OKC Energy	1	(0)
Total		51+	(2+)

Managerial career
- 2011–2013: Oklahoma State Cowgirls (assistant)
- 2014: OKC Energy (assistant)
- 2015–2017: OKC Energy U23
- 2015–2017: OKC Energy (assistant)
- 2019: Hartford Athletic (assistant)
- 2020: Miami FC (assistant)
- * Club domestic league appearances and goals

Chris Spendlove (born 18 December 1984) is an English former footballer.

== Early life and education ==
As a schoolboy, Spendlove played football for Everton and Preston North End. He was a five-year captain of district and regional representative squads back in his home town of Liverpool before he began his undergraduate and master's degrees at Oklahoma City University, playing with their soccer team during his four years there, recording 26 goals and 9 assists.

During his college career, Spendlove also played with USL Premier Development League club GPS Portland Phoenix during their 2010 season.

== Professional career ==
Spendlove signed his first professional contract in February 2011, joining USL Pro club Wilmington Hammerheads. He made his professional debut on 17 April 2011, in Wilmington's first game of the 2011 season, a 1–0 win over the Rochester Rhinos.

Prior to the 2020 USL Championship season, Spendlove became the assistant coach at Miami FC.

== Trial ==
In December 2014, Spendlove was arrested and charged with the murder of a police officer and two counts of malicious wounding in Liverpool, England. On 22 December, Oklahoma City Energy dismissed him as a result.

During the subsequent murder trial at Liverpool Crown Court, it was alleged that Spendlove had struck PC Steventon whilst he was on the floor. CCTV was released by Merseyside Police following the trial which appears to show the alleged punch. Spendlove was accused of watching out for his two friends whilst they attacked the officers.

In July 2015 he was cleared of all charges, while his two co-defendants were convicted.
