= Showalter Field =

Multi-purpose stadium in Winter Park, Florida

Coordinates: 28.594392°N 81.319877°W

Bob Mosher Track at Showalter Field
- Interactive map of Bob Mosher Track at Showalter Field
- Location: 2525 Cady Way; Winter Park, Florida
- Operator: Orange County Public Schools
- Surface: Grass

Construction
- Renovated: 1986

Tenants
- Central Florida Kraze (USL PDL) (2004-06, 2010-2011); Brooke House FC (USL League Two) (2024-present); Central Florida Panthers SC (NPSL) (2019-2022); Club de Lyon; (NISA) (2024-present): Winter Park High School

Bob Mosher Track at Showalter Field is a multi-purpose stadium located at Cady Way Park in Winter Park, Florida. It is operated by Orange County Public Schools, and serves as the primary sports facility for Winter Park High School. It is also the home venue for USL2 side Brooke House FC as well as National Independent Soccer Association team Club de Lyon. The field was named after Bob Mosher to dedicate his 33-year career at Winter Park High School.

Previously, Central Florida Kraze of the USL Premier Development League and National Premier Soccer League side Central Florida Panthers SC played home matches at the stadium. It has also hosted the FHSAA track and field finals through 2011.

The current Showalter Field is on land that was once the Aloma Country Club, until the land was purchased by brothers Howard and Sandy Showalter, and was turned into an upscale airpark for flying lessons and charter flights. In 1963 the land was purchased and changed to its present use

On February 24, 1995, the US Women's National Team defeated Denmark 7–0 in a match held at the venue. Michelle Akers scored a hat trick and Mia Hamm scored two goals.
