= Brett Branan =

American soccer player

Personal information
- Full name: Brett Branan
- Date of birth: February 17, 1983 (age 43)
- Place of birth: Atlanta, Georgia, United States
- Height: 6 ft 4 in (1.93 m)
- Position: Defender

College career
Years	Team	Apps	(Gls)
2001–2003	Clemson Tigers		
2004	Saint Louis Billikens		

Senior career*
Years	Team	Apps	(Gls)
2003	Greenville Lions	14	(1)
2004	Boulder Rapids Reserve	11	(1)
2005–2006	Minnesota Thunder	40	(0)
- * Club domestic league appearances and goals

Brett Branan (born February 17, 1983, in Atlanta) is a defender who last played for American USL First Division side Minnesota Thunder. His older brother Dustin Branan also played professional soccer. He played for the Thunder for two seasons, making 14 appearances in his inaugural season, and 24 in his second campaign where he was second on the team in total minutes played.

He graduated from Saint Louis University in 2005.
