= Orlando City U-23 =

Soccer team

- Full name: Orlando City Under-23s
- Founded: 1998 (as Central Florida Lionhearts)
- Dissolved: 2016
- Stadium: Seminole Soccer Complex; Lake Mary, Florida
- Capacity: 3,666
Home colors	Away colors

Orlando City U-23 was an American soccer team based in Lake Mary, Florida, United States. Founded in 1998, the team played in the Premier Development League (PDL), the fourth tier of the American Soccer Pyramid, in the Southeast Division of the Southern Conference. The team was part of the Orlando City SC youth development system, and played the majority of their home games at Seminole Soccer Complex in nearby Lake Mary, Florida.

The team's colors as the Kraze were blue, white and red, while they also occasionally wore forest green.

== History ==
The team was known as the Central Florida Lionhearts during their first year of existence. From 1999 to 2011, it was known as the Central Florida Kraze.

On November 30, 2011, Orlando City Soccer Club announced that it has purchased controlling interest in the Kraze, and would rename the club Orlando City U-23. The team also acquired a different youth club, Florida Soccer Alliance, and integrated them as Orlando City Youth Soccer to create a European-style development system.

== Players ==
=== Current roster ===
As of August 10, 2015

Note: Flags indicate national team as defined under FIFA eligibility rules; some limited exceptions apply. Players may hold more than one non-FIFA nationality.

No.	Pos.	Nation	Player
0	GK	USA	Braeden Luna
0	GK	USA	Mason Stajduhar
1	GK	AUS	Mitch Thorn
3	FW	USA	Ramzey Hassen
4	MF	HON	Christian Funes
5	MF	USA	Noah Franke
6	DF	ENG	Michael O'Sullivan
9	DF	BRA	Bernardo Carabelli
9	MF	COL	Nicholas Melo
10	DF	ENG	Jonathan Coleby
11	MF	USA	Andrew Brody
12	FW	USA	Freddy Ruiz
13	MF	USA	Alexis Martinez

No.	Pos.	Nation	Player
14	MF	USA	Eli Lockaby
15	DF	USA	Jeffery George
16	FW	BRA	Lucas Diniz
17	MF	USA	John Nartowicz
19	DF	USA	Nicholas O'Callaghan
20	DF	USA	Kyle Carr
21	FW	BRA	Joao Romalho
22	MF	USA	Dennis Zapata
23	MF	BRA	Pedro Codo
25	DF	USA	Ian Svantesson
26	MF	JAM	Jordan Thorpe
27	FW	USA	Alexander Norris
28	MF	USA	Eli Beates

=== Notable former players ===
This list of notable former players comprises players who went on to play professional soccer after playing for the team in the Premier Development League, or those who previously played professionally before joining the team.

- (Jamaica) Lyle Adams
- (England) Nick Regan
- (England) Tyler Blackwood
- (United States) Dennis Chin
- (United States) Dominic Cianciarulo
- (Argentina) Gonzalo De Mujica
- (United States) Jon Gruenewald
- (United States) Aly Hassan
- (Senegal) Adama Mbengue
- (United States) Ryan McIntosh
- (Colombia) Jonathan Mendoza
- (Russia) Sergei Raad
- (United States) Keith Savage
- (Panama) Tony Taylor
- (United States) Eric Vasquez
- (United States) Tanner Wolfe
- (United States) Graham Zusi

== Year-by-year ==
Year	Division	League	Regular season	Playoffs	Open Cup
1998	4	USISL PDSL	6th, Southeast	did not qualify	did not qualify
1999	4	USL PDL	3rd, Southeast	did not qualify	did not qualify
2000	4	USL PDL	4th, Southeast	did not qualify	1st round
2001	4	USL PDL	4th, Southeast	did not qualify	did not qualify
2002	4	USL PDL	3rd, Southeast	did not qualify	did not qualify
2003	4	USL PDL	2nd, Southeast	Conference Semi-finals	did not qualify
2004	4	USL PDL	1st, Southeast	PDL Champions	did not qualify
2005	4	USL PDL	2nd, Southeast	Conference Semi-finals	did not qualify
2006	4	USL PDL	2nd, Southeast	did not qualify	did not qualify
2007	4	USL PDL	2nd, Southeast	Conference Semi-finals	1st round
2008	4	USL PDL	1st, Southeast	Conference Semi-finals	did not qualify
2009	4	USL PDL	6th, Southeast	did not qualify	did not qualify
2010	4	USL PDL	4th, Southeast	did not qualify	1st round
2011	4	USL PDL	2nd, Southeast	Conference Semi-finals	1st round
2012	4	USL PDL	2nd, Southeast	Semi-finals	1st round
2013	4	USL PDL	3rd, Southeast	did not qualify	1st round
2014	4	USL PDL	5th, Southeast	did not qualify	did not qualify
2015	4	USL PDL	7th, Southeast	did not qualify	did not qualify

== Honors ==
- USL PDL Southern Conference Champions 2012
- USL PDL Southeast Division Champions 2008
- USL PDL Champions 2004
- USL PDL Southern Conference Champions 2004
- USL PDL Southeast Division Champions 2004

== Head coaches ==
- (United States) Joe Avallone (1999–2012)
- (England) Paul Shaw (2013–2015)

== Stadium ==
- Stadium at Edgewater High School; Orlando, Florida (1999–2002)
- Stadium at Winter Springs High School; Winter Springs, Florida (2003)
- Showalter Field; Winter Park, Florida (2004–2006, 2010–2011)
- Central Winds Park; Winter Springs, Florida (2006) 2 matches
- Kraze and Krush Stadium; Lake Mary, Florida (2007–2009)
- Cahall-Sandspur Field at Rollins College; Winter Park, Florida (2011) 1 match
- Citrus Bowl; Orlando, Florida (2011) 2 matches
- Stadium at The Master's Academy; Oviedo, Florida (2011) 1 match
- Seminole Soccer Complex; Lake Mary, Florida (2012–)

== Average attendance ==
Attendance stats are calculated by averaging each team's self-reported home attendances from the historical match archive at and Kenn.com https://kenn.com/blog/soccer/all-time-usl-league-two-attendance/

Central Florida Lionhearts

- 1998: 122 (19th in PDSL)

Central Florida Kraze

- 1999: 269 (19th in PDL)
- 2000: 338 (11th in PDL)
- 2001: 236 (21st in PDL)
- 2002: 300 (19th in PDL)
- 2003: 307 (27th in PDL)
- 2004: 361 (25th in PDL) Playoffs: 950 (1 Missing) or 1,133 (1 Missing) Overall: 542 or 554 (1 missing)
- 2005: 308 (30th in PDL)
- 2006: 271 (35th in PDL)
- 2007: 451 (22nd in PDL)
- 2008: 358 (27th in PDL)
- 2009: 261 (41st in PDL)
- 2010: 333 (33rd in PDL)
- 2011: 129 (52nd in PDL)

Orlando City U-23

- 2012: 296 (34th in PDL)
- 2013: 127 (52nd in PDL)
- 2014: 0 (63rd in PDL)
- 2015: 105
