= Narciso Fernandes =

American soccer player

Personal information
- Full name: Narciso Lima Fernandes
- Date of birth: September 20, 1978 (age 48)
- Place of birth: Brockton, Massachusetts, United States
- Height: 6 ft 3 in (1.91 m)
- Position: Midfielder

Youth career
- 1997–2000: Wisconsin Badgers

Senior career*
Years	Team	Apps	(Gls)
2001	Kansas City Wizards	1	(0)
2001	→ Pittsburgh Riverhounds (loan)	1	(0)
2003–2005	Rhode Island Stingrays	32	(17)
2006–2007	New Hampshire Phantoms	29	(7)
Total		64	(24)
- * Club domestic league appearances and goals

Narciso Lima Fernandes (born September 20, 1978) is an American former professional soccer player.

== Career ==
Fernandes was drafted in the fifth round of the 2001 MLS SuperDraft (59th overall) by Kansas City Wizards where he made one appearance. He also played for Pittsburgh Riverhounds, Rhode Island Stingrays and New Hampshire Phantoms.
