= John Pulido =

Colombian footballer (born 1981)

Personal information
- Full name: John Pulido Santodomingo
- Date of birth: October 3, 1981 (age 45)
- Place of birth: Barranquilla, Colombia
- Height: 5 ft 10 in (1.78 m)
- Position: Midfielder

Youth career
- 2000–2003: FIU Golden Panthers

Senior career*
Years	Team	Apps	(Gls)
2004	Colorado Rapids	23	
2005	FC Dallas	18	(0)
2008	Miami FC	92	(14)
- * Club domestic league appearances and goals as of 22 October 2009

John Pulido (born October 3, 1981) is a Colombian former footballer.

== Career ==
=== Youth and college ===
Pulido grew up in Miami, Florida, attended American High School, college soccer at Florida International University.

=== Professional ===
Pulido was drafted in the sixth round (55th overall) of the 2004 MLS SuperDraft by the Colorado Rapids. Instead, Pulido played with Colorado's development team while the green card was approved. Finally the green card was granted and signed with the first team. Boulder Rapids Reserve, in the USL Premier Development League, and featured for Boulder in the 2004 PDL Championship game.

His rights were traded to FC Dallas in June 2005 for a fourth-round pick in the 2006 MLS Supplemental Draft. After a spell with FC Dallas's team in 2005, Pulido was signed by USL First Division side Miami FC prior to their inaugural season in 2006. He was Miami's club captain in 2008 and stayed with the club until 2009.
