= Jeff Rowland (soccer) =

American soccer player and coach

Personal information
- Date of birth: June 18, 1984 (age 42)
- Place of birth: Albuquerque, New Mexico, United States
- Height: 6 ft 1 in (1.85 m)
- Position: Forward

Youth career
- 2002–2005: University of New Mexico

Senior career*
Years	Team	Apps	(Gls)
2003–2004	Indiana Invaders	25	(21)
2005	Chicago Fire Premier	11	(5)
2007	Real Salt Lake	0	(0)
2008	Wilmington Hammerheads	18	(5)
2008	FC Dallas	0	(0)

Managerial career
- 2011–2020: Washington Huskies (assistant)
- 2021-: Notre Dame (assistant)
- * Club domestic league appearances and goals as of August 16, 2008

Jeff Rowland (born June 18, 1984, in Albuquerque, New Mexico) is an American former soccer forward and soccer coach who serves as an assistant coach for the University of Notre Dame.

== Youth ==
Rowland attended La Cueva High School where he played on the boys soccer team. He missed his senior season with a knee injury and was not recruited by any major colleges. In 2002, he entered the University of New Mexico, making the Lobos soccer team as a walk on. He finished the season with three goals in ten games, earning a roster spot for the next season. Rowland led the Lobos in scoring the next three seasons, being selected as a 2004 and 2005 first team All American. He left the University of New Mexico as the most decorated soccer player in school history; as a Hermann Trophy finalist, the only two-time All-American in school history, a two-time Academic All-American, ranking 3rd in points, 2nd in goals, 9th in assists with 5 goals and 3 assists in NCAA Tournament play.

== Professional ==
During the 2003, 2004 and 2005 collegiate off seasons, Rowland played in the fourth division Premier Development League. In 2003 and 2004, he was with the Indiana Invaders and in 2005 with the Chicago Fire Premier. In 2004, he scored 18 goals in 15 games with the Invaders. On January 26, 2006, the Real Salt Lake picked Rowland second overall in the 2006 MLS Supplemental Draft. Rowland tore the anterior cruciate ligament in his right knee during the preseason. He had surgery, but Salt Lake waived him on March 31, 2006. Rowland lost the 2006 season, then rejoined Real Salt Lake in 2007 only to tear his right ACL before he played a game.

Salt Lake waived him again on May 10, 2007, when it became clear that he would lose the 2007 season. In 2008, Rowland rejoined Real Salt Lake, but was released in February. He then signed with the Wilmington Hammerheads of the USL Second Division.

Rowland signed a senior developmental contract with FC Dallas in September, 2008. However, he was waived a few months later after the 2008 season ended.

== Coaching ==
Ahead of the 2011 NCAA Division I men's soccer season, Rowland was named an associate head coach for the Washington Huskies men's soccer program. Prior to 2021, he moved to Notre Dame.
