= Ryan McIntosh =

American soccer player (born 1983)

Personal information
- Date of birth: March 19, 1983 (age 43)
- Place of birth: Hollywood, FL, U.S.
- Height: 6 ft 0 in (1.83 m)
- Position: Goalkeeper

College career
Years	Team	Apps	(Gls)
2002–2004	UCF Knights		

Senior career*
Years	Team	Apps	(Gls)
2004–2005	Central Florida Kraze	24	(0)
2006	D.C. United	0	(0)
2007–2008	Atlanta Silverbacks	28	(0)
- * Club domestic league appearances and goals as of 4 July 2013

Ryan McIntosh (born March 19, 1983) is an American former soccer goalkeeper.

== Early life and education ==
McIntosh grew up in South Florida playing on travel teams becoming one of the top youth goalkeepers in the State of Florida by the time he graduated from high school. He was selected to the Florida State ODP Team prior to his senior year at St. Thomas Aquinas High School. During his senior year, he posted .62 GAA and 17 shutouts, which helped lead his team to the Florida State Semi-Finals.

He went on to play college soccer for the University of Central Florida from 2002 to 2005. As a redshirt freshman, he earned the starting goalkeeper position and was voted to be a captain. He continued to be the starting goalkeeper and captain all four years, playing in every match and helping the team win three consecutive Atlantic Sun Conference Titles in 2002, 2003, and 2004. He was also named the Atlantic Sun Defensive Player of the Year in 2003 and 2004.

== Career ==
During his college career, he played for the Central Florida Kraze in the Premier Development League and earned a record of 16–5–1 in 22 games over two seasons, including winning the PDL National Championship in 2004.

In 2006, following his graduation from UCF, he was invited to preseason tryouts with the Chicago Fire, New York Red Bulls, and D.C. United. In March 2006, he signed a one-year developmental contract with D.C. United as the third-string goalkeeper behind USMNT Goalkeeper Nick Rimando and USMNT Goalkeeper Troy Perkins. McIntosh spent his first season with the club developing under these two goalkeepers and playing with the reserve squad but made the game-day roster several times. He appeared in seven reserve team games (four starts) helping the team earn a 6–5–1 record. He allowed seven goals during his time in goal and recorded one shutout while maintaining a goals-against-average of 1.25.

In 2007, McIntosh signed for USL-1 side Atlanta Silverbacks with a plan to earn more match experience. During the 2007 Lamar Hunt U.S. Open Cup McIntosh grabbed national attention following a performance against FC Dallas, though his ten-man Atlanta side fell short following a shootout McIntosh was lauded by fans and pundits. He also made a save in a penalty shootout to win the USL Playoff Semi-Final at the Portland Timbers stadium in front of thousands of fans.

In 2008, McIntosh began the season as the starting goalkeeper the Atlanta Silverbacks but the team struggled to win matches the first half of the season resulting in the coach making several changes to the starting line-up. The Atlanta Silverbacks did not make the USL-1 playoffs. Though McIntosh was still under contract with Atlanta, he decided it was best to retire from soccer and go back to school.

== Honors ==
=== University of Central Florida ===
- Atlantic Sun Conference Champions (3): 2002, 2003, 2004
- Atlantic Sun Defensive Player of the Year (2): 2003, 2004

=== Central Florida Kraze ===
- USL Premier Development League National Champions (1): 2004
