= Paul Ballard (soccer) =

Canadian soccer coach

Personal information
- Full name: Paul Ballard
- Date of birth: May 17, 1983 (age 43)
- Place of birth: New Westminster, British Columbia, Canada
- Height: 5 ft 11 in (1.80 m)
- Position: Defender

Youth career
- 2003–2006: Trinity Western Spartans

Senior career*
Years	Team	Apps	(Gls)
2007	Vancouver Whitecaps Residency		
2008	Aziz Kara		
2009	Cleveland City Stars	15	(0)
2010–2012	Abbotsford Mariners	1	(0)
- * Club domestic league appearances and goals as of 22 October 2009

Paul Ballard (born May 17, 1983 in New Westminster, British Columbia) is a Canadian soccer coach. He is currently the head coach of the women's soccer program at Bishop's University.

== Career ==
Ballard received his UEFA A coaching license from IFA in 2018. He is currently the director of soccer at Bishop's University and the head coach of the varsity women's soccer team.

Ballard started his coaching career in Langley with the Langley United Soccer Association, where he was awarded the Fraser Valley coach of the year. He was also an assistant coach with the Trinity Western Men's soccer team from 2012 to 2016.

=== University ===
Ballard played college soccer at Trinity Western, where he was a four-time Canada West Conference First Team All-Star, a two-time All-Canadian in 2005 and 2006, and the Trinity Western University Athlete of the Year in both 2005 and 2006. He graduated with an undergrad degree in 2006. He completed his master's degree in leadership in 2017 at Trinity Western University.

=== Professional ===
Ballard began his professional career playing in Vancouver Whitecaps developmental program, with Vancouver Whitecaps Residency in the Pacific Coast Soccer League.

After spending the 2008 season playing in South Africa with F.C. AK in the National First Division, Ballard joined the Cleveland City Stars of the USL First Division on April 20, 2009. He played 15 games for Cleveland before being released at the end of the season when the club folded.

Having been unable to secure a professional contract elsewhere, Ballard signed to play for Abbotsford Mariners in the USL Premier Development League in 2010.

From 2010 to 2012, Paul played in the NIFL Championship 1 in Northern Ireland with H&W Welders and Dundela FC. Due to multiple serious knee injuries, Paul retired from professional soccer at the end of the 2012 season.

== Honors and awards ==
Western Men's Soccer Wall of Fame 2016
