= Indiana Invaders =

- Full name: Indiana Invaders
- Nickname: Invaders
- Founded: 1998
- Dissolved: 2011
- Ground: Indiana Invaders Sports Complex; South Bend, Indiana
- Capacity: 5,000
- Owner: Mario Manta
- League: USL Premier Development League
- Website: www.invaderscomplex.com
Home colors	Away colors

The Indiana Invaders was an American soccer team based in South Bend, Indiana, United States. Founded in 1998, the team played in the USL Premier Development League (PDL), the fourth tier of the American Soccer Pyramid, in the Great Lakes Division of the Central Conference.

The team played its home games at the soccer-specific Indiana Invaders Soccer Complex since 2003. The team's colors were blue, gold and black.

The team was part of the larger Invaders FC soccer club, which organizes more than 25 boys and girls youth soccer teams in northern Indiana. The club also fielded a team in the USL's Super-20 League, a league for players 17 to 20 years of age run under the United Soccer Leagues umbrella.

== Players ==
=== Notable former players ===
This list of notable former players comprises players who went on to play professional soccer after playing for the team in the Premier Development League, or those who previously played professionally before joining the team.

- (United States) Clint Dempsey
- (United States) Brent Brockman
- (United States) Conner Cappelletti
- (Zimbabwe) Mubarike Chisoni
- (United States) Bright Dike
- (Jamaica) Shaun Francis
- (United States) Kevin Goldthwaite
- (United States) Brad Knighton
- (United States) Nathan Micklos
- (United States) Steven Perry
- (United States) Brian Plotkin
- (United States) Alec Purdie
- (United States) Jeff Rowland
- (United States) Kwame Sarkodie
- (Japan) Minori Sato
- (United States) Jack Stewart
- (Trinidad and Tobago) Ryan Stewart
- (Japan) Hideaki Takeda
- (United States) Michael Tanke
- (United States) Phil Tuttle
- (United States) Lance Watson

== Year-by-year ==
Year	Division	League	Regular season	Playoffs	Open Cup
1998	4	USISL PDSL	5th, Great Lakes	Did not qualify	Did not qualify
1999	4	USL PDL	4th, Great Lakes	Did not qualify	Did not qualify
2000	4	USL PDL	5th, Great Lakes	Did not qualify	Did not qualify
2001	4	USL PDL	4th, Great Lakes	Did not qualify	Did not qualify
2002	4	USL PDL	5th, Great Lakes	Did not qualify	Did not qualify
2003	4	USL PDL	2nd, Great Lakes	Conference Semifinals	Did not qualify
2004	4	USL PDL	3rd, Great Lakes	Did not qualify	Did not qualify
2005	4	USL PDL	3rd, Great Lakes	Did not qualify	Did not qualify
2006	4	USL PDL	3rd, Great Lakes	Did not qualify	Did not qualify
2007	4	USL PDL	5th, Great Lakes	Did not qualify	Did not qualify
2008	4	USL PDL	3rd, Midwest	Did not qualify	Did not qualify
2009	4	USL PDL	5th, Great Lakes	Did not qualify	Did not qualify
2010	4	USL PDL	5th, Great Lakes	Did not qualify	Did not qualify
2011	4	USL PDL	4th, Great Lakes	Did not qualify	Did not qualify

== Head coach ==
- (Uruguay) Mario Manta (2003–2011)

== Stadium ==
- Indiana Invaders Sports Complex; South Bend, Indiana (2003–Present)

== Average attendance ==
Attendance stats are calculated by averaging each team's self-reported home attendances from the historical match archive at https://web.archive.org/web/20100105175057/http://www.uslsoccer.com/history/index_E.html and Kenn.com https://kenn.com/blog/soccer/all-time-usl-league-two-attendance/

- 1998: 447 (11th in PDSL)
- 1999: 362 (12th in PDL)
- 2000: 323 (12th in PDL)
- 2001: 338 (11th in PDL)
- 2002: 372 (16th in PDL)
- 2003: 357 (21st in PDL)
- 2004: 363 (24th in PDL)
- 2005: 443 (17th in PDL)
- 2006: 499 (12th in PDL)
- 2007: 336 (30th in PDL)
- 2008: 282 (41st in PDL)
- 2009: 583 or 571 (19th in PDL)
- 2010: 599 (20th in PDL)
- 2011: 308 (28th in PDL)
