= 2005 U.S. Open Cup =

2005 Lamar Hunt U.S. Open Cup
Tournament details
- Country: United States

Final positions
- Champions: Los Angeles Galaxy (2nd title)
- Runners-up: FC Dallas

Tournament statistics
- Top goal scorer(s): Herculez Gomez; Melvin Tarley (6 goals each)

The 2005 Lamar Hunt U.S. Open Cup ran from June through September, 2005, open to all soccer teams in the United States.

The Los Angeles Galaxy won their second Open Cup championship with a 1–0 victory over FC Dallas at the Home Depot Center in Carson, California.

Although two Major League Soccer sides played in the final, the tournament featured several runs by underdogs. The Des Moines Menace of the Premier Development League beat two USL First Division teams to reach the Fourth Round. The Minnesota Thunder of the USL First Division beat three MLS teams in succession to reach the semifinals. The Rochester Raging Rhinos continued to play to record crowds and beat the MetroStars before losing in a shootout to the Chicago Fire. Four of the tournament's final 15 games went to overtime.

== Open Cup Bracket ==
Home teams listed on top of bracket

Third Round
USL1	Portland Timbers	2
USL1	Seattle Sounders	0
USL2	Charlotte Eagles	2
MLS	Chivas USA (AET)	3
USL1	Atlanta Silverbacks	1
PDL	Des Moines Menace	5
USL1	Minnesota Thunder (AET)	6
MLS	Real Salt Lake	4
USL1	Richmond Kickers	8
PDL	Ocean City Barons	4
MLS	FC Dallas (AET)	3
USL2	Wilmington Hammerheads	2
USL1	Rochester Rhinos	2
USL1	Virginia Beach Mariners	1
USL2	Western Mass Pioneers	1
MLS	Chicago Fire	3

Fourth Round
USL1	Portland Timbers	0
MLS	San Jose Earthquakes	2
MLS	Chivas USA	2
MLS	Los Angeles Galaxy	5
MLS	Kansas City Wizards	6
PDL	Des Moines Menace	1
USL1	Minnesota Thunder	4
MLS	Colorado Rapids	1
USL1	Richmond Kickers	1
MLS	D.C. United	3
MLS	Columbus Crew	1
MLS	FC Dallas (AET)	3
USL1	Rochester Rhinos	3
MLS	MetroStars	1
MLS	New England Revolution	2
MLS	Chicago Fire (AET)	3

Quarterfinals
MLS	San Jose Earthquakes	1
MLS	Los Angeles Galaxy	2
MLS	Kansas City Wizards	1
USL1	Minnesota Thunder	3
MLS	D.C. United	1 (1)
MLS	FC Dallas (AET, PEN)	1 (4)
USL1	Rochester Rhinos	1 (4)
MLS	Chicago Fire (AET, PEN)	1 (5)

Semifinals
MLS	Los Angeles Galaxy	5
USL1	Minnesota Thunder	2
MLS	FC Dallas	1
MLS	Chicago Fire	0

Final
MLS	Los Angeles Galaxy	1
MLS	FC Dallas	0

== Schedule ==
Note: Scorelines use the standard U.S. convention of placing the home team on the right-hand side of box scores.

=== Qualifying round ===
Teams from USASA and PDL start.

June 8, 2005	Salinas Valley Samba (USASA)	1–1 (a.e.t.) (4–2 p)	Cascade Surge (PDL)	Salem, Oregon
	Jeffery Stepan 33'	(Report) Report 2	Tony Chavez 26'	Stadium: McCulloch Stadium; Attendance: 511; Referee: Eduardo Irigoyen (USA)

June 8, 2005	Dallas Roma F.C. (USASA)	7–2	Cocoa Expos (PDL)	Cocoa, Florida
	Jamie Harrigan 10', 89'; Patrick Shamu 24', 38'; Carl Bussey 24'; Juan Sastoque 46'; Matt Williams 59'	(Report)	Janak Altidore 44'; James Phillips 47' (pen)	Stadium: Cocoa Expo Sports Center; Attendance: 100; Referee: Richard Rodriguez (USA)

=== First round ===
Teams from USASA, PDL, and USL-2.

June 15, 2005	Baltimore Colts F.C. (USASA)	0–3	Richmond Kickers Future (PDL)	Richmond, Virginia
		Report	Dominic Oduro 45', 62'; Christian Neagu 64'	Stadium: Sports Backers Stadium; Attendance: 254; Referee: John Schmitz (USA)

June 15, 2005	Cincinnati Kings (USL-2)	2–4	Reggae Boyz (USASA)	Indianapolis, Indiana
	Travis Sobers 85'; George Kithas 86'	(Report)	Dave Beck 8', 70'; Moussa Zagnogo 25', 49'	Stadium: Kuntz Memorial Stadium; Attendance: 293; Referee: Doug Ferguson (USA)

June 15, 2005	Ocean City Barons (PDL)	3–0	Greek American Atlas (USASA)	Jamaica, New York
	Byron Carmichael 63'; Mike Todd 65'; Tony Donatelli 86'	Report		Stadium: Belson Stadium; Attendance: 101; Referee: Steve Karaduzovic (USA)

June 15, 2005	AAC Eagles (USASA)	1–4	Chicago Fire Premier (PDL)	Algonquin, Illinois
	Marek Nowicki 48'	Report	Drew Deguarian 9'; Jeffery Rowland 29'; David Leung 42'; Brandon Moss 84'	Stadium: Jacobs High School; Attendance: -- Referee: Abbey Okulaja (USA)

June 15, 2005	Azzurri F.C. (USASA)	2–5	Dallas Roma F.C. (USASA)	Bedford, Texas
	Alex Smith 50'; Jay Needham 57'	Report	Carl Bussey 17'; Juan Sastoque 36'; Matt Williams 63'; Mark Rowland 77'; Jesus Rodriguez 89'	Stadium: Pennington Field; Attendance: -- Referee: Fernando Galvan (USA)

June 15, 2005	Orange County Blue Star (PDL)	1–3	El Paso Patriots (PDL)	El Paso, Texas
	Daniel Frias 90'	Report	Omar Mora 28'; Tyson Wahl 42' (og); Tyler Theslof 43'	Stadium: Patriot Stadium; Attendance: -- Referee: Jair Marrufo (USA)

June 15, 2005	Pittsburgh Riverhounds (USL2)	1–1 (a.e.t.) (2–4 p)	Des Moines Menace (PDL)	Waukee, Iowa
	Greg Victor 101'	(Report)	Brian Biggerstaff 111'	Stadium: Waukee Stadium; Referee: Hidajet Tica (USA)

June 15, 2005	Salinas Valley Samba (USASA)	2–2 (a.e.t.) (6–5 p)	Sonoma County Sol (USASA)	Santa Rosa, California
	David Frank 90'; Chris Bessimer 113'	(Report)	Trevor Hurst 59'; D.J. Sigler 108'	Stadium: Ernie Nevers Field; Attendance: 550; Referee: Pete Fletcher (USA)

=== Second round ===
Four USL-1 and four USL-2 teams enter.

June 29, 2005	Charleston Battery (USL1)	2–3	Des Moines Menace (PDL)	Waukee, Iowa
	Greg Simmonds 60'; Lazo Alavanja 65'	(Report)	Tomas Boltnar 8'; Michael Kraus 14'; Armin Mujdzic 80'	Stadium: Waukee Stadium; Attendance: 1,492; Referee: Doug Jotzke (USA)

June 29, 2005	Charlotte Eagles (USL2)	4–1	El Paso Patriots (PDL)	El Paso, Texas
	Patrick Daka 12; Chris Lemons 47'; Dustin Swinehart 71', 77'	(Report)	Miguel Larrosa 90'	Stadium: Patriot Stadium; Attendance: -- Referee: Fernando Galvan (USA)

June 29, 2005	Long Island Rough Riders (USL2)	0–4	Ocean City Barons (PDL)	Ocean City, New Jersey
		(Report)	Ruben Mingo 30'; Tony Donatelli 64' (pen); Christopher Williamson 67'; Steven Wacker 70'	Stadium: Carey Stadium; Attendance: -- Referee: Hossam Saad (USA)

June 29, 2005	Dallas Roma F.C. (USASA)	0–5	Wilmington Hammerheads (USL2)	Wilmington, North Carolina
		(Report)	Kenny Bundy 9'; Paul Chase 11'; Ben Hill 25'; James Gledhill 75'; Junior Zarate 90'	Stadium: Legion Stadium; Attendance: -- Referee: Kenneth George (USA)

June 29, 2005	Richmond Kickers Future (PDL)	0–3	Virginia Beach Mariners (USL1)	Virginia Beach, Virginia
		(Report)	David Castellanos 5'; Darren Caskey 23'; Tim O'Neill 71'	Stadium: Virginia Beach Sportsplex; Attendance: 530; Referee: Dan Stead (USA)

June 29, 2005	Reggae Boyz (USASA)	0–5	Western Mass Pioneers (USL2)	Ludlow, Massachusetts
		(Report)	Omar McFarlane 5', 61'; Kyle Fletcher 41'; Rigel Qosa 59'; Kevin McMenamin 79'	Stadium: Lusitano Stadium; Attendance: 1,250; Referee: Guido Gonzalez (USA)

June 29, 2005	Chicago Fire Premier (PDL)	1–2	Minnesota Thunder (USL1)	Saint Paul, Minnesota
	Brandon Moss 90'	(Report)	Johnny Menyongar 62'; 89' (og)	Stadium: James Griffin Stadium; Attendance: 1,115; Referee: Troy Cohrs (USA)

June 29, 2005	Salinas Valley Samba (USASA)	1–3	Seattle Sounders (USL1)	Tukwila, Washington
	Adam Smart 51'	(Report)	Brent Whitfield 65', 90'; Roger Levesque 75'	Stadium: Starfire Sports Complex; Attendance: 521; Referee: Jeff Hosking (USA)

=== Third round ===
Four USL-1 and four MLS teams enter.

July 12, 2005	Seattle Sounders (USL1)	0–2	Portland Timbers (USL1)	Portland, Oregon
		(Report)	15' Hugo Alcaraz-Cuellar; 59' Dan Antoniuk	Stadium: PGE Park; Attendance: 2,462; Referee: Yader Reyes (USA)

July 13, 2005	C.D. Chivas USA (MLS)	3–2 (a.e.t.)	Charlotte Eagles (USL2)	Davidson, North Carolina
	Esteban Arias 3'; Thiago Martins 84'; Isaac Romo 20'	(Report) Report 2	24' Jacob Coggins; 81' Dustin Swinehart	Stadium: Richardson Stadium; Attendance: 2,500; Referee: Andrew Chapin (USA)

July 13, 2005	Des Moines Menace (PDL)	5–1	Atlanta Silverbacks (USL1)	Clarkston, Georgia
	Matthew Kreikemeyer 8'; Tomas Boltnar 12' (PK); Michael Kraus 26' 51'; Edwin Disang 50'	(Report)	33' David Hayes	Stadium: DeKalb Memorial Stadium; Attendance: -- Referee: Roni Canales (USA)

July 13, 2005	Real Salt Lake (MLS)	4–6 (a.e.t.)	Minnesota Thunder (USL1)	Saint Paul, Minnesota
	Jason Kreis 9' (PK) 50' 70'; Jamie Watson 38'	(Report)	16' 66' Melvin Tarley; 17' Johnny Menyongar; 89' 107' Aaron Paye; 96' Matt Schmidt	Stadium: James Griffin Stadium; Attendance: 2,218; Referee: Abbey Okulaja (USA)

July 13, 2005	Ocean City Barons (PDL)	4–8	Richmond Kickers (USL1)	Richmond, Virginia
	Byron Carmichael 4' 41'; Tony Donatelli 54'; Matthew Delicate 84'	(Report)	12' Peter Luzak; 13' 16' 28' McColm Cephas; 69' Kevin Jeffrey; 77' Tim Brown; 82' Matt Bobo; 84' Michael Todd 84'	Stadium: Sports Backers Stadium; Attendance: 702; Referee: Ben Jones (USA)

July 13, 2005	Wilmington Hammerheads (USL2)	1–3 (a.e.t.)	FC Dallas (MLS)	Dallas, Texas
	Derek Popovich 18'	(Report)	35' Abe Thompson; 98' Carey Talley; 112' Roberto Mina	Stadium: UT-Dallas; Attendance: -- Referee: Jair Marrufo (USA)

July 13, 2005	Virginia Beach Mariners (USL1)	1–2	Rochester Raging Rhinos (USL1)	Rochester, New York
	John Barry Nusum 43'	(Report) Report 2	50' (PK) Rene Rivas; 80' Kirk Wilson	Stadium: Frontier Field; Attendance: 7,838; Referee: Kenneth Heller (USA)

July 13, 2005	Chicago Fire (MLS)	3–1	Western Mass Pioneers (USL2)	Ludlow, Massachusetts
	Will John 16' 45'; Lubos Reiter 24'	(Report) Report 2	5' Neil Krause	Stadium: Lusitano Stadium; Attendance: 3,124; Referee: Erich Simmons (USA)

=== Fourth round ===
August 3, 2005	San Jose Earthquakes (MLS)	2–0	Portland Timbers (USL1)	Portland, Oregon
	Wade Barrett 27'; Brian Mullan 63'	(Report)		Stadium: PGE Park; Attendance: 6,607; Referee: Alex Prus (USA)

August 3, 2005	C.D. Chivas USA (MLS)	2–5	Los Angeles Galaxy (MLS)	Carson, California
	Douglas Sequeira 4'; Ramon Ramirez 20'	(Report)	Cobi Jones 16'; Joseph Ngwenya 36'; Herculez Gomez 45'; Landon Donovan 89'; Paulo Nagamura 90'+	Stadium: Home Depot Center Track & Field Stadium; Attendance: -- Referee: Michael Kennedy (USA)

August 3, 2005	Des Moines Menace (PDL)	1–6	Kansas City Wizards (MLS)	Parkville, Missouri
	Matt Wieland 12'	(Report)	Davy Arnaud 9'; Josh Wolff 16' (pen), 65' (pen); Sasha Victorine 31'; Scott Sealy 75'; Davy Arnaud 83'	Stadium: Julian Field; Attendance: 2,000; Referee: Roni Canales (USA)

August 3, 2005	Colorado Rapids (MLS)	1–4	Minnesota Thunder (USL1)	Saint Paul, Minnesota
	Alain Nkong 69'	(Report)	Melvin Tarley 38', 48', 72', 76'	Stadium: James Griffin Stadium; Attendance: 3,191; Referee: Marcel Yonan (USA)

August 3, 2005	D.C. United (MLS)	3–1	Richmond Kickers (USL1)	Richmond, Virginia
	Freddy Adu 26'; Christian Gomez 76' (pen), 81'	(Report)	McColm Cephas 69'	Stadium: University of Richmond Stadium; Attendance: 8,412; Referee: Abbey Okulaja (USA)

August 3, 2005	FC Dallas (MLS)	3–1 (a.e.t.)	Columbus Crew (MLS)	Columbus, Ohio
	Carey Talley 29'; Abe Thompson 113'; Eddie Johnson 116'	(Report)	Kyle Martino 36'	Stadium: Jesse Owens Memorial Stadium; Attendance: -- Referee: Ricardo Salazar (USA)

August 3, 2005	MetroStars (MLS)	1–3	Rochester Raging Rhinos (USL1)	Rochester, New York
	Sergio Galvan Rey 85'	(Report)	Scott Palguta 20'; Mauro Carabajal 30'; Rene Rivas 58' (pen)	Stadium: Frontier Field; Attendance: 10,547; Referee: Erich Simmons (USA)

August 3, 2005	Chicago Fire (MLS)	3–2 (a.e.t.)	New England Revolution (MLS)	Ludlow, Massachusetts
	Andy Herron 18', 99'; C.J. Brown 96'	(Report) Report 2	Shalrie Joseph 22'; Andy Dorman 120'	Stadium: Lusitano Stadium; Attendance: 3,866; Referee: Terry Vaughn (USA)

=== Quarterfinals ===
August 24, 2005	Los Angeles Galaxy (MLS)	2–1	San Jose Earthquakes (MLS)	San Jose, California
	Herculez Gomez 5', 31'	(Report)	Ronald Cerritos 76'	Stadium: Spartan Stadium; Attendance: 5,134; Referee: Terry Vaughn (USA)

August 24, 2005	Minnesota Thunder (USL1)	3–1	Kansas City Wizards (MLS)	Parkville, Missouri
	Johnny Menyongar 33', 58'; Shavar Thomas 54' (og)	(Report)	Ryan Pore 71'	Stadium: Julian Field; Attendance: 1,551; Referee: Michael Kennedy (USA)

August 24, 2005	FC Dallas (MLS)	1–1 (a.e.t.) (4–1 p)	D.C. United (MLS)	Germantown, Maryland
	Carlos Ruiz 90+4'	(Report)	Christian Gomez 47'	Stadium: Maryland SoccerPlex; Attendance: 4,258; Referee: Abbey Okulaja (USA)
	Penalties
	Carlos Ruiz (penalty scored); Greg Vanney (penalty scored); Bobby Rhine (penalty scored); Abe Thompson (penalty scored)		Freddy Adu (penalty scored); John Wilson (penalty missed); Joshua Gros (penalty missed)

August 24, 2005	Chicago Fire (MLS)	1–1 (a.e.t.) (5–4 p)	Rochester Raging Rhinos (USL1)	Rochester, New York
	Samuel Caballero 34'	(Report)	Doug Miller 60'	Stadium: Frontier Field; Attendance: 11,121; Referee: Alex Prus (USA)
	Penalties
	Thiago (penalty scored); Chad Barrett (penalty scored); Iván Guerrero (penalty scored); Zach Thornton (penalty scored); Chris Armas (penalty scored)		Doug Miller (penalty scored); Tenywa Bonseu (penalty scored); Jonathan Bolaños (penalty missed); Greg Howes (penalty scored); Rene Rivas (penalty scored)

=== Semifinals ===
September 14, 2005	Minnesota Thunder (USL1)	2–5	Los Angeles Galaxy (MLS)	Carson, California
	Johnny Menyongar 54'; Chad Dombrowski 85'	(Report)	Landon Donovan 29'; Herculez Gomez 44', 81'; Tyrone Marshall 77'; Joseph Ngwenya 82'	Stadium: Home Depot Center; Attendance: 4,373; Referee: Jair Marrufo (USA)

September 14, 2005	Chicago Fire (MLS)	0–1	FC Dallas (MLS)	Frisco, Texas
		(Report)	Ronnie O'Brien 20'	Stadium: Pizza Hut Park; Attendance: 7,311; Referee: Baldomero Toledo (USA)

=== Final ===
September 28, 2005
TV: GolTV

FC Dallas (MLS)	0–1	Los Angeles Galaxy (MLS)
	(Report)	Herculez Gomez 25'

Home Depot Center; Carson, California
Attendance: 10,000 (capacity)
Referee: Alex Prus (USA)

FC Dallas	Los Angeles Galaxy

== Top scorers ==
Position	Player	Club	Goals
1	Herculez Gomez	Los Angeles Galaxy	6
	Melvin Tarley	Minnesota Thunder	6
3	Johnny Menyongar	Minnesota Thunder	5
4	McColm Cephas	Richmond Kickers	4

== See also ==
- United States Soccer Federation
- Lamar Hunt U.S. Open Cup
- Major League Soccer
- United Soccer Leagues
- USASA
- National Premier Soccer League
- 2005 National Amateur Cup
