= 2006 U.S. Open Cup =

2006 Lamar Hunt U.S. Open Cup
Tournament details
- Country: United States

Final positions
- Champions: Chicago Fire (4th title)
- Runners-up: Los Angeles Galaxy

Tournament statistics
- Top goal scorer(s): Tomas Boltnar; Andy Herron; Ben Hollingsworth; Randi Patterson (4 goals each)

The 2006 Lamar Hunt U.S. Open Cup ran from June through September, open to all soccer teams in the United States.

The Chicago Fire won 3–1 over defending-champion Los Angeles Galaxy in the final at Toyota Park in Bridgeview, Illinois. It was the Fire's fourth Open Cup title in nine years.

The early rounds were most notable for the surprising run of amateur side Dallas Roma F.C. of the North Texas Premier Soccer Association. Roma barely survived the first round in a penalty shootout win over PDL side Laredo Heat before upsetting Miami FC of the USL First Division 1–0 in the second round. Roma's biggest upset came in the third round with another shootout win, this time over CD Chivas USA.

The latter rounds of the tournament were dominated by MLS teams and both semifinals were matchups between conference rivals. The Galaxy, who had ended Roma's Cinderella run, beat Houston Dynamo in one semifinal, while Chicago beat league leader D.C. United in the other semifinal. In the championship game played at first-year Toyota Park, the host side scored two early goals en route to their 3–1 win.

== Open Cup bracket ==
Home teams listed on top of bracket

Third Round; July 12
MLS	Kansas City Wizards	2
PDL	Des Moines Menace	1
USL1	Rochester Rhinos	5
USL2	New Hampshire Phantoms	1
PDL	Michigan Bucks	1
MLS	Columbus Crew	4
USL2	Wilmington Hammerheads	2
USL1	Atlanta Silverbacks	1
MLS	Chivas USA	0 (2)
USASA	Dallas Roma FC (AET, PSO)	0 (4)
MLS	Real Salt Lake (AET)	2
USL1	Virginia Beach Mariners	1
PDL	Carolina Dynamo (AET)	3
USL1	Seattle Sounders	2
USL1	Charleston Battery	3
USL1	Portland Timbers	1

Fourth Round; August 2
MLS	Chicago Fire	2
MLS	Kansas City Wizards	0
USL1	Rochester Rhinos	0 (4)
MLS	New England Revolution (AET, PSO)	0 (5)
MLS	D.C. United (AET)	2
MLS	Columbus Crew	1
USL2	Wilmington Hammerheads	1
MLS	New York Red Bulls	2
MLS	Los Angeles Galaxy	2
USASA	Roma FC	0
MLS	Real Salt Lake	0
MLS	Colorado Rapids	1
MLS	Houston Dynamo	4
PDL	Carolina Dynamo	2
USL1	Charleston Battery	3 (3)
MLS	FC Dallas (AET, PSO)	3 (5)

Quarterfinals; August 23
MLS	Chicago Fire	2
MLS	New England Revolution	1
MLS	D.C. United	3
MLS	New York Red Bulls	1
MLS	Los Angeles Galaxy (AET)	3
MLS	Colorado Rapids	1
MLS	Houston Dynamo	3
MLS	FC Dallas	0

Semifinals; September 6
MLS	Chicago Fire	3
MLS	D.C. United	0
MLS	Los Angeles Galaxy	3
MLS	Houston Dynamo	1

Final; September 27
MLS	Chicago Fire	3
MLS	Los Angeles Galaxy	1

== Schedule ==
Note: Scorelines use the standard U.S. convention of placing the home team on the right-hand side of box scores.

=== Qualifying round ===
Teams from USASA and PDL start.

June 7, 2006	Cape Cod Crusaders (PDL)	2–0	Allied SC (USASA)	Baltimore, Maryland
	Adam Mitchinson 30'; Eric Breach 65' (og)	(Report)		Attendance: -- Referee: Jeff Gontarek (USA)

June 7, 2006	Croatian Eagles (USASA)	1–4	Des Moines Menace (PDL)	Waukee, Iowa
	Jason Willan 72' (pen)	(Report)	Armin Mujdzic 22'; Edwin Disang 45'+ Tomas Boltnar; Cody Kother 90'	Stadium: Waukee Stadium; Attendance: 476; Referee: Daniel Cataldi (USA)

=== First round ===
Teams from USASA, PDL, and USL-2.

June 14, 2006	Pittsburgh Riverhounds (USL-2)	0–2	Michigan Bucks (PDL)	Rochester, Michigan
		(Report)	Kenny Uzoigwe 14'; Mychal Turpin 56'	Stadium: Adams High School; Attendance: -- Referee: Richard Rodriguez (USA)

June 14, 2006	Virginia Beach Submariners (PDL)	1–3	Wilmington Hammerheads (USL-2)	Wilmington, North Carolina
	Dave Horst 84'	(Report)	Anthony Maher 42'; Kenny Bundy 73'; Junior Zarate 80'	Stadium: Legion Stadium; Attendance: -- Referee: -- (USA)

June 14, 2006	Dallas Roma F.C. (USASA)	2–2 (a.e.t.) (4–2 p)	Laredo Heat (PDL)	Laredo, Texas
	Brad Flanagan 50'; John Calandro 116'	(Report)	Ernesto Contreras 33'; Arnoldo Presas 106'	Stadium: The Student Activity Center; Attendance: -- Referee: Elias Bazakos (USA)

June 14, 2006	Dallas Mustang Legends (USASA)	2–3	Des Moines Menace (PDL)	Waukee, Iowa
	Mike Anderson 51' ??	(Report)	Tomas Boltnar 40' (pen); Tomas Boltnar 53'; Edwin Disang 86'	Stadium: Waukee Stadium; Attendance: 547; Referee: Hidajet Tica (USA)

June 14, 2006	Milford International (USASA)	1–0	Chicago Lightning (USASA)	Chicago, Illinois
	Alex DeFaria 20'	(Report)		Stadium: Loyola University; Attendance: -- Referee: Peter Balciunas (USA)

June 14, 2006	BYU Cougars (PDL)	1–5	Arizona Sahuaros (USASA)	Phoenix, Arizona
	Brock Trejo 70' (pen)	(Report)	Brian Thames 53'; Giber Becerra 68'; Giber Becerra 73' (pen); Dominic Papa 79'; Dominic Papa 88'	Stadium: Grand Canyon University; Attendance: -- Referee: Richard Mackey (USA)

June 14, 2006	Ogden Outlaws (PDL)	1–1 (a.e.t.) (5–6 p)	Sonoma County Sol (NPSL)	Santa Rosa, California
	Noah Sharpersteen 55'	(Report)	Quincy Amarikwa 48'	Stadium: Ernie Nevers Field; Attendance: -- Referee: Yader Reyes (USA)

June 15, 2006	Cape Cod Crusaders (PDL)	3–4	Carolina Dynamo (PDL)	Greensboro, North Carolina
	David Bulow 48' (pen); David McGuire 51'; David Bulow 70'	(Report)	Randi Patterson 40'; Randi Patterson 45'; Adam Mitchinson 57' (og); Randi Patterson 60'	Stadium: Macpherson Stadium; Attendance: -- Referee: Michael Hill (USA)

=== Second round ===
USL-1 teams enter.

June 28, 2006	Sonoma County Sol (NPSL)	0–1	Charleston Battery (USL-1)	Charleston, South Carolina
		(Report)	Ben Hollinsworth 49'	Stadium: Blackbaud Stadium; Attendance: 1,302; Referee: Roni Canales (USA)

June 28, 2006	Charlotte Eagles (USL-2)	1–3	Wilmington Hammerheads (USL-2)	Wilmington, North Carolina
	Patrick Daka 69'	(Report)	Derek Popovich 26'; Anthony Maher 80'; Anthony Maher 83'	Stadium: Legion Stadium; Attendance: 1,185; Referee: Saeed Mohamed (USA)

June 28, 2006	Cincinnati Kings (USL-2)	1–2	Michigan Bucks (PDL)	Rochester Hills, Michigan
	Mike McGinlay 38'	(Report)	Tyiselani Shipalane 1'; Nate Jafta 49'	Stadium: Stoney Creek H.S; Attendance: -- Referee: Marc Lawrence (USA)

June 28, 2006	Richmond Kickers (USL-2)	0–1	Carolina Dynamo (PDL)	Greensboro, North Carolina
		(Report)	Ben Hunter 30'	Stadium: Macpherson Stadium; Attendance: -- Referee: Charles Mitchell (USA)

June 28, 2006	Milford International (USASA)	1–4	New Hampshire Phantoms (USL-2)	Manchester, New Hampshire
	Michael Butler 15'	(Report)	Nick Tornaritas 27'; Almir Barbosa 79'; Almir Barbosa 80'; Valderar Tiexeira	Stadium: Southern New Hampshire University; Attendance: -- Referee: Kenneth Etheridge (USA)

June 28, 2006	Des Moines Menace (PDL)	1–0	Minnesota Thunder (USL-1)	St. Paul, Minnesota
	Tomas Boltnar 54'	(Report)		Stadium: James Griffin Stadium; Attendance: 1,060; Referee: Fotis Bazakos (USA)

June 28, 2006	Miami FC (USL-1)	0–1	Dallas Roma F.C. (USASA)	Richardson, Texas
		(Report)	John Waters 13' (pen)	Stadium: UT-Dallas; Attendance: ~600; Referee: Fernando Galvan (USA)

June 28, 2006	Virginia Beach Mariners (USL-1)	1–0	Arizona Sahuaros (USASA)	Phoenix, Arizona
	Gregory Simmonds 74'	(Report)		Stadium: Grand Canyon University; Attendance: 1,100; Referee: Robert Walker (USA)

=== Third round ===
Four MLS teams enter.

July 11, 2006	Virginia Beach Mariners (USL-1)	1–2 (a.e.t.)	Real Salt Lake (MLS)	Salt Lake City, Utah
	Tim O'Neill 37'	(Report)	Jeff Cunningham 28' (pen); Andy Williams 93'	Stadium: Rice-Eccles Stadium; Attendance: 6,960; Referee: Richard Heron (USA)

July 12, 2006	Portland Timbers (USL-1)	1–3	Charleston Battery (USL-1)	Charleston, South Carolina
	Luke Kreamalmeyer 4'	(Report)	Ben Hollinsworth 37', 86' (pen); Gavin Glinton 79'	Stadium: Blackbaud Stadium; Attendance: 1,437; Referee: Roni Canales (USA)

July 12, 2006	Atlanta Silverbacks (USL-1)	1–2	Wilmington Hammerheads (USL-2)	Wilmington, North Carolina
	Alex Pineda Chacon 60'	(Report)	Kevin Nylan 25'; Chris Bagley 75'	Stadium: Legion Stadium; Attendance: -- Referee: Mark Kadlecik (USA)

July 12, 2006	Columbus Crew (MLS)	4–1	Michigan Bucks (PDL)	Rochester Hills, Michigan
	Knox Cameron 17'; Ivan Becerra 60'; Jacob Thomas 86'; Erik Nelson 88' (og)	(Report)	Doug Rice 22'	Stadium: Stoney Creek H.S; Attendance: ~3,000; Referee: Hilario Grajeda (USA)

July 12, 2006	Seattle Sounders (USL-1)	2–3 (a.e.t.)	Carolina Dynamo (PDL)	Greensboro, North Carolina
	Cam Weaver 76'; Andrew Gregor 96' (pen)	(Report)	Michael Lahoud 78'; Ben Hunter 98'; Darryl Roberts	Stadium: Macpherson Stadium; Attendance: -- Referee: Guy Goodrich (USA)

July 12, 2006	New Hampshire Phantoms (USL-2)	1–5	Rochester Raging Rhinos (USL-1)	Rochester, New York
	Almir Barbosa 18'	(Report)	John Ball 12'; Matthew Delicate 32'; Charles Gbeke 40'; Connally Edozien 86'; Aaran Lines 89'	Stadium: PAETEC Park; Attendance: 5,412; Referee: Kevin Barci (USA)

July 12, 2006	Des Moines Menace (PDL)	1–2	Kansas City Wizards (MLS)	Overland Park, Kansas
	Brad Whitsitt 72'	(Report)	Ryan Pore 64'; Scott Sealy 90'	Stadium: Blue Valley Athletic Complex; Attendance: 2,012; Referee: Ramon Hernandez (USA)

July 12, 2006	Dallas Roma F.C. (USASA)	0–0 (a.e.t.) (4–2 p)	C.D. Chivas USA (MLS)	Santa Barbara, California
		(Report)		Stadium: Harder Stadium; Attendance: 2,127; Referee: Baldomero Toledo (USA)

=== Fourth round ===
Eight MLS teams enter.

August 1, 2006	Columbus Crew (MLS)	1–2 (a.e.t.)	D.C. United (MLS)	Germantown, Maryland
	Chad Marshall 18'	(Report)	Jaime Moreno 22'; Jamil Walker 93'	Stadium: Maryland SoccerPlex; Attendance: 4,774; Referee: Terry Vaughn (USA)

August 1, 2006	Dallas Roma F.C. (USASA)	0–2	Los Angeles Galaxy (MLS)	Carson, California
		(Report)	Quavas Kirk 35'; Alan Gordon 70'	Stadium: Home Depot Center Track Stadium; Attendance: 4,937; Referee: Richard Heron (USA)

August 2, 2006	New England Revolution (MLS)	0–0 (a.e.t.) (5–4 p)	Rochester Raging Rhinos (USL-1)	Rochester, New York
		(Report)		Stadium: PAETEC Park; Attendance: 9,503; Referee: Michael Kennedy (USA)
	Penalties
	Shalrie Joseph (penalty missed); Andy Dorman (penalty missed); José Cancela (penalty scored); Steve Ralston (penalty scored); Matt Reis (penalty scored); James Riley (penalty scored); Jeff Larentowicz (penalty scored)		Mike Ambersley (penalty scored); John Ball (penalty scored); Matthew Delicate (penalty missed); Tenywa Bonseu (penalty missed); Aaran Lines (penalty scored); Kenney Bertz (penalty scored); Frank Sanfilippo (penalty missed)

August 2, 2006	Colorado Rapids (MLS)	1–0	Real Salt Lake (MLS)	Salt Lake City, Utah
	Jacob Peterson 61'	(Report)		Stadium: Rice-Eccles Stadium; Attendance: 4,546; Referee: Ricardo Salazar (USA)

August 2, 2006	FC Dallas (MLS)	3–3 (a.e.t.) (5–3 p)	Charleston Battery (USL-1)	Charleston, South Carolina
	Kenny Cooper 45'+ Kenny Cooper 89'; Kenny Cooper 120'	(Report)	Ben Hollinsworth 63' pen Ian Fuller 91'+ pen Luc Harrington 114'	Stadium: Blackbaud Stadium; Attendance: 2,332; Referee: Mark Geiger (USA)
	Penalties
	Ronnie O'Brien (penalty scored); Chris Gbandi (penalty scored); Ramón Núñez (penalty scored); Kenny Cooper (penalty scored); Simo Valakari (penalty scored)		Luc Harrington (penalty scored); Lazo Alavanja (penalty scored); Troy Lesesne (penalty scored); Luke Vercollone (penalty missed)

August 2, 2006	Carolina Dynamo (PDL)	2–4	Houston Dynamo (MLS)	Houston, Texas
	Wells Thompson 62'; Randi Patterson 71'	(Report)	Alejandro Moreno 29'; Alejandro Moreno 33'; Ronald Cerritos 58'; Eddie Robinson 82'	Stadium: Robertson Stadium; Attendance: 10,428; Referee: Óscar Ortiz (USA)

August 2, 2006	New York Red Bulls (MLS)	2–1	Wilmington Hammerheads (USL-2)	Wilmington, North Carolina
	Seth Stammler 4'; Jordan Cila 86'	(Report)	Ryan Miller 85'	Stadium: Legion Stadium; Attendance: 4,263; Referee: Roni Canales (USA)

(PPD from August 2) August 14, 2006	Kansas City Wizards (MLS)	0–2	Chicago Fire (MLS)	Bridgeview, Illinois
		(Report)	Calen Carr 18'; Andy Herron 65'	Stadium: Toyota Park; Attendance: 5,874; Referee: Marcel Yonan (USA)

=== Quarterfinals ===
August 23, 2006	New York Red Bulls (MLS)	1–3	D.C. United (MLS)	Washington, D.C.
	Amado Guevara 41'	(Report)	Josh Gros 37'; Jamil Walker 61'; Jamil Walker 84'	Stadium: RFK Stadium; Attendance: 8,637; Referee: Alex Prus (USA)

August 23, 2006	New England Revolution (MLS)	1–2	Chicago Fire (MLS)	Bridgeview, Illinois
	Taylor Twellman 27'	(Report)	Andy Herron 12'; Andy Herron 58'	Stadium: Toyota Park; Attendance: 5,214; Referee: Jair Marrufo (USA)

August 23, 2006	FC Dallas (MLS)	0–3	Houston Dynamo (MLS)	Houston, Texas
		(Report)	Eddie Robinson 13'; Alejandro Moreno 57'; Chris Wondolowski 61'	Stadium: Carl Lewis Track & Field Stadium; Attendance: 4,000; Referee: Terry Vaughn (USA)

August 23, 2006	Colorado Rapids (MLS)	1–3 (a.e.t.)	Los Angeles Galaxy (MLS)	Carson, California
	Clint Mathis 3'	(Report)	Quavas Kirk 45'; Landon Donovan 93'; Landon Donovan 115'	Stadium: Home Depot Center; Attendance: 6,014; Referee: Kevin Stott (USA)

=== Semifinals ===
September 6, 2006	D.C. United (MLS)	0–3	Chicago Fire (MLS)	Bridgeview, Illinois
		(Report)	Justin Mapp 58'; Calen Carr 76'; Calen Carr 91+'	Stadium: Toyota Park; Attendance: 5,153; Referee: Richard Heron (USA)

September 6, 2006	Houston Dynamo (MLS)	1–3	Los Angeles Galaxy (MLS)	Carson, California
	Dwayne De Rosario 12'	(Report)	Alan Gordon 6'; Landon Donovan 44'; Santino Quaranta 93+'	Stadium: Home Depot Center; Attendance: 6,144; Referee: Jair Marrufo (USA)

=== Final ===
September 27, 2006
8:00 PM
Fox Soccer Channel

Los Angeles Galaxy (MLS)	1–3	Chicago Fire (MLS)
Alan Gordon 51'	(Report)	Nate Jaqua 10'; Andy Herron 16'; Thiago 88'

Toyota Park
Bridgeview, Illinois
Attendance: 8,151
Referee: Terry Vaughn (USA)

Los Angeles Galaxy	Chicago Fire

Note: All times Eastern Daylight Time unless noted.

== Top scorers ==
Position	Player	Club	Goals
1	Ben Hollingsworth	Charleston Battery	4
1	Andy Herron	Chicago Fire	4
1	Randi Patterson	Carolina Dynamo	4
1	Tomas Boltnar	Des Moines Menace	4

== See also ==
- 2006 National Amateur Cup
