= 2001 USL D3 Pro League =

USL D3 Pro League
- Season: 2001
- Champions: Utah Blitzz (1st Title)
- Regular Season title: Utah Blitzz (1st Title)
- Matches: 152
- Goals: 557 (3.66 per match)
- Best Player: (Syria) Fadi Afash Utah Blitzz
- Top goalscorer: (United States) Mark Manganello Rhode Island Stingrays (17 Goals)
- Best goalkeeper: (United States) J. J. Woziak Stanislaus County Cruisers

Statistics of USL D3 Pro League in season 2001.

== League standings ==
Northern Conference
Team	Pld	W	D	L	GF	GA	GD	BP	Pts
Boston Bulldogs	18	10	2	6	41	27	+14	8	50
New Hampshire Phantoms	18	8	2	8	35	31	+4	7	41
New Jersey Stallions	18	9	2	7	26	25	+1	3	41
Reading Rage	18	8	2	8	32	33	−1	5	39
Rhode Island Stingrays	18	8	1	9	34	39	−5	5	38
South Jersey Barons	18	6	1	11	35	42	−7	5	30
Western Mass Pioneers	18	6	1	11	29	36	−7	4	29

Southern Conference
Team	Pld	W	D	L	GF	GA	GD	BP	Pts
Wilmington Hammerheads	17	11	0	6	39	23	+16	6	50
Carolina Dynamo	18	9	3	6	29	20	+9	5	44
Greenville Lions	18	5	3	10	25	31	−6	4	27
Northern Virginia Royals	17	1	0	16	9	63	−54	0	4

Western Conference
Team	Pld	W	D	L	GF	GA	GD	BP	Pts
Utah Blitzz	18	14	1	3	59	22	+37	11	68
Chico Rooks	18	11	1	6	43	25	+18	7	52
Stanislaus United Cruisers	18	10	1	7	32	31	+1	4	45
Arizona Sahuaros	18	5	2	11	25	39	−14	4	26
Tucson Fireballs	18	5	0	13	40	64	−24	5	25
Northern Nevada Aces	18	4	1	13	24	55	−31	3	20

== Playoffs ==
=== Conference semi-finals ===
- Boston defeated Reading, 6-0
- New Jersey defeated New Hampshire 4-2
- Greenville defeated Carolina 2-1
- Stanlslaus defeated Arizona 2-1
- Chico defeated Tucson 5-1
August 10, 2001

Boston Bulldogs	6–0	Reading Rage
Seth Lilburn 13', 83'; Kevin Jones 24', 46'; Methembe Ndlovu 26'; Ryan Lucas 74'

Bowditch Field, Framingham, Massachusetts

August 10, 2001

Stanislaus United Cruisers	2–1	Arizona Sahuaros
Manuel Brasil	Report	Brad Moore

Patton Field, Modesto, California
Attendance: 300

August 11, 2001
7:30 PM EDT

New Jersey Stallions	4–2	New Hampshire Phantoms
Julio Cesar Dos Santos 2'; Jason Cairns; Jeff Rigby		Jamie Williams; 80' Elie Monteiro

Memorial Stadium, New Brunswick, New Jersey

August 11, 2001

Chico Rooks	5–1	Tucson Fireballs
Brandon Kaplan 43'; Joe Munoz 44', 55'; Luis Mario Orellana 59', 90'	Report	67' (pen.) Milos Tomic; (red card) 80' Maxi Viera; (red card) 80' Drazenko Pendic

Rooks Stadium, Chico, California

August 15, 2001
7:30 PM EDT

Carolina Dynamo	1–2	Greenville Lions
CJ. Robinson 85'	Report	25', 90+5' Herbert Dos Santos; (yellow card) Taylor Tucker

Bryan Park Soccer Complex, Browns Summit, North Carolina

=== Conference Finals/Quarterfinals ===
- Boston defeated New Jersey 2-0
- Greenville defeated Wilmington 3-3 (4-3 PK)
- Stanislaus United defeated Chico 2-1
Northern Conference Final
August 18, 2001
7:30 PM EDT

Boston Bulldogs	2–0	New Jersey Stallions
James Proctor 44'; Kevin Jones 75'	Report

Alan Carson Field, South Yarmouth, Massachusetts

Southern Conference Final
August 18, 2001
7:30 PM EDT

Wilmington Hammerheads	3–3 (a.e.t.)	Greenville Lions
Jeff Nikocaj 3'; Mike Franks 81'	Report	80' Jerome Lee Yaw
Penalties
Chad Crandell (penalty missed); Junior Zarate (penalty missed)	3–4

UNCW Soccer Stadium, Wilmington, North Carolina

Western Conference Final
August 18, 2001

Chico Rooks	1–2	Stanislaus United Cruisers
Luis Mario Orellana 87'	Report	62', 74' Manuel Brasil

Rooks Stadium, Chico, California

=== Semifinals ===
- Greeneville defeated Boston 2-1 (OT)
- Utah defeated Stanislaus United 3-0
August 24, 2001
7:30 PM EDT

Boston Bulldogs	1–2 (OT)	Greenville Lions
Ryan Lucas 90+'	Report	18' 94' Mike Adeyemi

Bowditch Field, Framingham, Massachusetts
August 24, 2001

Utah Blitzz	3–0	Stanislaus United Cruisers
Adolfo Ovalle 44' (pen.); Fadi Afash 65', 86'	Report

South Field, Provo, Utah

=== USL D3 Pro League Championship ===
- Utah defeated Greenville 1-0

September 1, 2001
3:00 PM

Utah Blitzz	1–0	Greenville Lions
Jorge Estrada 90'	Report

Franklin Covey Field, Salt Lake City, Utah
Attendance: 6,000
