= Chad Crandell =

American soccer player (born 1975)

Personal information
- Date of birth: July 8, 1975 (age 51)
- Place of birth: Des Moines, Iowa, U.S.
- Height: 5 ft 10 in (1.78 m)
- Position: Midfielder

Youth career
- Creighton
- Miami University

Senior career*
Years	Team	Apps	(Gls)
1999–2003	Wilmington Hammerheads	62	(5)
2004	Des Moines Menace	15	(5)
2005–2007	Wilmington Hammerheads	22	(0)
- * Club domestic league appearances and goals as of 17 September 2006

Chad Crandell (born July 8, 1975) is an American former soccer midfielder who spent most of his career with the USL Second Division Wilmington Hammerheads.

Crandell grew up in Des Moines, Iowa, where he attended Theodore Roosevelt High School. He played college soccer at Creighton University and Miami University.

Crandell began his professional career with the San Diego Flash of the A-League before playing a season of indoor soccer with the Wichita Wings of the National Professional Soccer League.

In 1999, Crandell signed with the Wilmington Hammerheads of the USL Second Division. In 2004 he played for the Des Moines Menace of the Premier Development League. He was the oldest player on the team.

He enjoys the outdoors and likes skiing, cycling and fishing and his favorite TV show is CSI: Crime Scene Investigation. His favorite food is sushi.
