= Legends FC =

- Full name: Legends Football Club
- Founded: 1992
- Ground: Richland Stadium; Dallas, Texas
- Owner: (Afghanistan) Kanishka Ali
- Head Coach: (Afghanistan) Kanishka Ali
- League: NTPSA Division 1A (Tier 5)
- Spring 2014: NTPSA Division 1A, 1st
Home colors	Away colors

Legends FC is an American semi-professional soccer team based in Dallas, Texas, United States. Founded in 1992, the team plays in Region III of the United States Adult Soccer Association, a network of amateur leagues at the fifth tier of the American Soccer Pyramid.

The team plays its home games in the stadium at Richland College. The team's colors are white and red.

== History ==
Legends FC was founded in 1992 by Kanish Ali, an immigrant from Afghanistan, and several friends who played together at the high school, college and club levels.

The team plays in the North Texas Premier Soccer Association, a successful league which is a member of the United States Adult Soccer Association Region III group of leagues. The Legends won the USASA U-23 Cup in 2009, in addition to numerous other local and regional trophies.

The Legends have a long and successful history in competing in the Lamar Hunt U.S. Open Cup. They first qualified for the tournament in 2004, but lost 3-1 to state rivals DFW Tornados in the first round, despite fielding a team that included future MLS players such as Ugo Ihemelu.

They qualified again in 2006 (playing as the Dallas Mustang Legends), but lost again in the first round, this time to USL Premier Development League side Des Moines Menace. After narrowly missing out in qualification in 2008 and 2009 they returned to the competition again in 2010, but lost in the first round for a third time, 3-0 to USSF Division 2 Professional League side FC Tampa Bay.

== Players ==
=== 2014 USASA Region III National Cup roster ===
Note: Flags indicate national team as defined under FIFA eligibility rules; some limited exceptions apply. Players may hold more than one non-FIFA nationality.

No.	Pos.	Nation	Player
—	DF	USA	Adriel Adibi
—	MF	USA	Gabriel Arredono
—	MF	USA	Sean Bellomy
—	DF	USA	Beau Bellomy
—	MF	USA	Cameron Brown
—	FW	BRA	Paulo da Silva
—	DF	BRA	Diogo de Almeida
—	DF	USA	Cody Ellis
—	FW	CMR	Kaze Etienne
—	DF	SEN	Abdoulay Faly

No.	Pos.	Nation	Player
—	MF	BRA	Authur Ivo
—	FW	USA	Ryan Latham
—	MF	USA	Daniel Lopez
—	FW	ENG	Jamie Lovegrove
—	MF	USA	Robert Luevano
—	MF	USA	Tommy Nelson
—	MF	USA	Kristian Quintana
—	FW	USA	Anthony Santaga
—	GK	USA	Matt Wideman
—	GK	USA	Ryan Shaughnessy
—	GK	USA	James Webb
—	FW	USA	Kevin White
—	FW	USA	Anoop Sankar

=== 2014 Fall NTPSA Division 1A Squad ===
Note: Flags indicate national team as defined under FIFA eligibility rules; some limited exceptions apply. Players may hold more than one non-FIFA nationality.

No.	Pos.	Nation	Player
—	DF	USA	Adriel Adibi
—		AFG	Kanishka Ali
—			Gabriel Arredondo
—	MF	USA	Sean Bellomy
—	DF	USA	Beau Bellomy
—	MF	USA	Cameron Brown
—	FW	BRA	Paulo da Silva
—	DF	BRA	Diogo de Almeida
—			Tuan Doan
—	DF	USA	Kevin Ellis
—	FW	CMR	Kaze Etienne
—	DF	SEN	Abdoulay Faly

No.	Pos.	Nation	Player
—	MF	BRA	Authur Ivo
—			Alex Johnston
—	FW	USA	Ryan Latham
—	MF	USA	Daniel Lopez
—	FW	ENG	Jamie Lovegrove
—	MF	USA	Robert Luevano
—	MF	USA	Tommy Nelson
—	MF	USA	Kristian Quintana
—	FW	USA	Anthony Santaga
—			Jules Renner
—	GK	USA	Matt Wideman
—	GK	USA	Ryan Shaughnessy
—	GK	USA	James Webb
—	FW	USA	Kevin White

=== Notable players ===
- (United States) Bobby Rhine
- (United States) Ugo Ihemelu
- (United States) T.J. Tomasso
- (United States) Esteban Mariel
- (United States) Manuel Mariel
- (United States) Steven McCarthy
- (United States) Dillon Powers

== Year-by-year ==
Year	Division	League	Regular season	Playoffs	Open Cup
2004	5	USASA			First Round
2006	5	USASA			First Round
2008	5	USASA			Did not qualify
2009	5	USASA			Did not qualify
2010	5	USASA			First Round

== Managers ==
- (Afghanistan) Kanishka Ali (1992–present)

== Stadium ==
- Richland Stadium; Dallas, Texas (????-present)
