= 2006 National Amateur Cup =

Soccer tournament

Following are the results of the 2006 National Amateur Cup, the annual amateur cup held by the United States Adult Soccer Association.

== Region I ==
Preliminary round

May 7, 2006

| Boston Olympiakos | 1-0 | Pancyprian |

May 7, 2006

| Baltimore Colts | 3-2 | Ukrainian Nationals |

Quarterfinals

May 21, 2006

| Boston Olympiakos | - | St. Michael's |

May 21, 2006

| Phantom Future | 3-0 | U.S. Parma |

May 21, 2006

| Baltimore Colts | 5-0 | Kirkwood |

May 21, 2006

| LCC International | 3-2 | German American Kickers |

Semifinals

June 11, 2006

| Boston Olympiakos | - | Phantom Future |

June 11, 2006

| Baltimore Colts | 6-2 | LCC International |

Final

June 25, 2006
2:00PM

| Boston Olympiakos | - | Baltimore Colts |

== Region II ==
The Region II winner was HNK Zrinski (Chicago).

== Region III ==
The Region III tournament took place at Burbank Soccer Complex in Baton Rouge, LA from May 27–28.

Azzurri (North Texas) advanced to the National finals.

== Region IV ==
The Region IV tournament took place in Seattle, WA from May 19–21.

Group A

May 19, 2006
3:00PM

| Rovers | 0-2 | Santa Clara Sporting |

Seattle, WA
May 19, 2006
3:00PM

| Tepeaca La Puenta | 4-2 | FC Pacific |

Seattle, WA
May 20, 2006
9:00AM

| Tepeaca La Puenta | 2-0 | Rovers |

Seattle, WA
May 20, 2006
9:00AM

| FC Pacific | 1-3 | Santa Clara Sporting |

Seattle, WA
May 20, 2006
3:00PM

| Rovers | 3-2 | FK Pacific |

Seattle, WA
May 20, 2006
3:00PM

| Santa Clara Sporting | 0-1 | Tepeaca La Puenta |

Seattle, WA

Group B

May 19, 2006
3:00PM

| Seattle Americans | 1-5 | Westside Action |

Seattle, WA
May 19, 2006
3:00PM

| Hibernian Saints | 4-3 | Lazio |

Seattle, WA
May 20, 2006
9:00AM

| Lazio | 1-1 | Seattle American |

Seattle, WA
May 20, 2006
9:00AM

| Westside Action | 1-5 | Hibernian Saints |

Seattle, WA
May 20, 2006
3:00PM

| Westside Action | 0-1 | Lazio |

Seattle, WA
May 20, 2006
3:00PM

| Hibernian Saints | 3-0 | Seattle American |

Seattle, WA

Final

May 21, 2006
9:00AM

| Hibernian Saints | 1-0 | Tepeaca La Puente |

Seattle, WA

== National Championship ==
Semifinals

August 4, 2006
10:00AM

| Boston Olympiakos | 0-1 | HNK Zrinski |

Frisco, TX
August 4, 2006
10:00AM

| Azzurri | 1-0 | Hibernian Saints |
|---|---|---|
| 55' Ryan Kneipper |

Frisco, TX

Final

August 6, 2006
10:00AM

| HNK Zrinski | 3-6 | Azzurri |
|---|---|---|
| 1H' (2); 1OT' | | 2', 16' Shawn Casella; 1OT', 2OT' Ryan Kneipper; 1OT', 2OT' Alejandro Perez |

Frisco, TX

== U.S. Open Cup Qualifying ==
=== Region I ===
Preliminary round

May 7, 2006

| Pancyprian | 1-1 | Allied SC |

May 7, 2006

| St. Michael | 0-3 | Phantom Future |

Quarterfinals

May 14, 2006

| Allied SC | 3-3 | SC Portuguese |

May 14, 2006

| Aegean Hawks | 1-4 | Ukrainian Nationals |
|---|---|---|
| | | Virgus Anusauskas (4) |

May 14, 2006

| Phantom Future | 1-4 | White Eagles |

May 14, 2006

| Green Briar | 0–4 | Milford International |

Semifinals

May 28, 2006

| Ukrainian Nationals | 1-2 | Allied SC |

Horsham, PA
May 28, 2006

| White Eagles | - | Milford International |

Final

June 25, 2006
4:00PM

| Allied SC | - | Milford International |

Horsham, PA

=== Region II ===
Croatian Eagles (Wisconsin) and Lightning (Chicago) qualify for Lamar Hunt Open Cup. Lightning advance to USASA Open Cup finals.

=== Region III ===
Roma (Dallas) and Mustang Legends (Dallas) qualify for Lamar Hunt Open Cup. Roma advance to USASA Open Cup finals.

=== Region IV ===
Group A

May 19, 2006
7:00PM

| CD Azteca | 0-6 | San Jose Frogs |

Seattle, WA
May 20, 2006
1:00PM

| Arizona Sahuaros | 8-1 | CD Azteca |

Seattle, WA
May 20, 2006
7:00AM

| San Jose Frogs | 0-3 | Arizona Sahuaros |

Seattle, WA

Group B

May 19, 2006
7:00PM

| Sonoma County Sol | 9-0 | SudaCa |

Seattle, WA
May 20, 2006
1:00PM

| Chico Rooks | 5-0 | SudaCa |

Seattle, WA
May 20, 2006
7:00PM

| Sonoma County Sol | 0-0 | Chico Rooks |

Seattle, WA

Final

May 21, 2006
9:00AM

| Sonoma County Sol | 2-1 | Arizona Sahuaros |

Seattle, WA

=== National Semifinals ===
August 4, 2006
8:00AM

| Milford International | 0-6 | Lightning |

Frisco, TX
August 4, 2006
8:00AM

| Dallas Roma | 2-3 | Sonoma County Sol |
|---|---|---|
| | | Michael Briceno; David Briceno (2) |

Frisco, TX

=== National Final ===
August 5, 2006
8:30AM

| Lightning | 0-1 | Sonoma County Sol |
|---|---|---|
| | | David Briceno |

Frisco, TX

== See also ==
2006 U.S. Open Cup
