= Mediacom Stadium =

Sports venue in Des Moines, Iowa, United States

- Interactive map of Mediacom Stadium
- Full name: Mediacom Stadium
- Address: 1427 25th St; Des Moines, Iowa; United States
- Coordinates: 41°36′16″N 93°39′7″W
- Owner: Des Moines Public Schools
- Operator: Drake University
- Capacity: 4,000
- Surface: Artificial turf

Construction
- Built: 2021
- Opened: 2023
- Cost: $24 million (est.)

Tenants
- Drake Bulldogs (NCAA) soccer (2023–present); Des Moines Menace (2026–); Des Moines Public Schools football: North HS (2023–present); Hoover HS (2023–2024); Lincoln HS (2023–present); Roosevelt HS (2023–present); Des Moines Public Schools soccer (select matches): North HS (2024–present); Hoover HS (2024–present); Lincoln HS (2024–present); Roosevelt HS (2024–present)

Website
- godrakebulldogs.com/facilities/mediacom-stadium/1020

Mediacom Stadium is a multipurpose rectangular stadium in Des Moines, Iowa. Owned by Des Moines Public Schools and located on the campus of Drake University, it serves as the home of the university's men's and women's soccer programs, the home football venue for three Des Moines high schools, and a home field for four of the city's boys' and girls' soccer programs.

== History ==
First announced in 2019, the stadium is a partnership between the school district and the university. The stadium allowed the university's teams to move on-campus, having previously played at Cownie Soccer Complex on the south side of the city. The stadium replaced multiple on-campus home stadiums for high school football; the scholastic soccer programs continue to play some games on campus to supplement Mediacom Stadium matches.

== Uses ==
In addition to its primary tenants, the stadium hosts the state high school boys' soccer championship. Grand View University and the Des Moines Menace have also played home games at the facility.
