= North Texas Premier Soccer Association =

NTPSA Division 1A
- Founded: 1974
- Country: United States
- Confederation: US Soccer
- Divisions: 1
- Number of clubs: 10
- Level on pyramid: 5
- Promotion to: Regionals/US Open Cup
- Relegation to: NTPSA Division 1B
- Current champions: NTX Rayados
- Website: http://www.ntpsa.futbol

NTPSA Division 1B
- Founded: 1974
- Country: United States
- Confederation: US Soccer
- Divisions: 1
- Number of clubs: 10
- Level on pyramid: 6
- Promotion to: NTPSA Division 1A
- Relegation to: NTPSA Division 2
- Current champions: Rangers FC
- Website: http://www.ntpsa.futbol

NTPSA Division 2
- Founded: 1974
- Country: United States
- Confederation: US Soccer
- Divisions: 1
- Number of clubs: 10
- Level on pyramid: 7
- Promotion to: NTPSA Division 1B
- Relegation to: NTPSA Division 3
- Current champions: E.D.S.A.
- Website: http://www.ntpsa.futbol

NTPSA Division 3
- Founded: 1974
- Country: United States
- Confederation: US Soccer
- Divisions: 1
- Number of clubs: 10
- Level on pyramid: 8
- Promotion to: NTPSA Division 2
- Relegation to: NTPSA Division 4
- Current champions: FC Denton
- Website: http://www.ntpsa.futbol

NTPSA Division 4
- Founded: 1974
- Country: United States
- Confederation: US Soccer
- Divisions: 1
- Number of clubs: 10
- Level on pyramid: 9
- Promotion to: NTPSA Division 3
- Relegation to: NTPSA Division 5
- Current champions: Dallas iTeam
- Website: http://www.ntpsa.futbol

NTPSA Division 5
- Founded: 1974
- Country: United States
- Confederation: US Soccer
- Divisions: 1
- Number of clubs: 10
- Level on pyramid: 10
- Promotion to: NTPSA Division 4
- Relegation to: None
- Current champions: Olympia FC
- Website: http://www.ntpsa.futbol

The North Texas Premier Soccer Association (NTPSA) is a soccer league based in North Texas which is run under the USASA. The league gained some fame once one of their clubs Dallas Roma F.C. reached the fourth round of the 2006 Lamar Hunt U.S. Open Cup. This was followed by the NTX Rayados also reaching the fourth round of the 2018 Lamar Hunt U.S. Open Cup.

NTPSA is a non-profit adult men's sports organization serving Dallas and the seven surrounding counties in North Texas. Organized in 1974 as a combination of two leagues, NTPSA has grown over the last 25 years to 5,000+ players annually in five age groupings. This league has age group divisions for "Open" (18+), Over-30, Over-40, Over-50, and Over-60 age brackets.

== Clubs ==
=== Men's open divisions ===
Accurate as of 29 January 2019

Division 1A	Division 1B	Division 2	Division 3	Division 4	Division 5
01A LEGENDS FC	01B BORUSSIA DALLAS	2 FC PREMIER SENIOR	3 SOMERSET RAIDERS	4 TIKKI TAKKA TOE FC	5 FC FORTNITE
01A MATADORS	01B DUNDER MIFFLIN PC	2 SOMERSET FC	3 FURY FC	4 NEXUS FC	5 LOS COMPAS
01A RANGERS FC	01B DARTOS	2 INTER DALLAS FC	3 TURLES FC	4 RED PHOENIX	5 AVERAGE JOES
01A PROVIDENT FC	01B GAMTEX FC	2 BAD FC	3 DRAGON	4 VN UNITED-SGP	5 THE FIGHTING OWLS
01A SANTOS	01B CRUSADERS ASF	2 LONESTAR REPUBLIC	3 LANES FC	4 EL DIABLO BLANCO	5 FC BOLTS
01A NTX RAYADOS	01B TRINITY UNITED	2 AC MILAN	3 DIAVOLO ROSE	4 ZOMBO	5 DOT'S HOP HOUSE
01A CELTICS	01B CLEARLY OFFSIDE	2 FC THAL	3 FC RETRO UNITED	4 AUTOBOTS FC	5
01A LEON FC	01B	2 DALLAS OLD BOYS FC	3 WEEKENDERS FC	4 LONESTAR TOWN	5
01A SOMERSET UNITED					

== Previous Division 1A winners ==
Season	Champion	Best record in the regular season
Spring 2006	Azzurri	
Fall 2006	Dallas Roma	
Spring 2007	Dallas Roma	
Fall 2007	Legends FC	
Spring 2008	Dallas Roma	
Fall 2008	Dallas Roma	
Spring 2009	Legends FC	
Fall 2009	Legends FC	
Spring 2010	United	
Fall 2010	Legends FC	
Spring 2011	Dallas Roma	
Fall 2011	NTX Rayados	
Spring 2012	NTX Rayados	
Fall 2012	NTX Rayados	
Spring 2013	NTX Rayados	
Fall 2013	Legends FC	
Spring 2014	Legends FC	
Fall 2014	Santos FC	Legends FC
Spring 2015	??	??
Fall 2015	Legends FC	Legends FC (9-0-0)
Spring 2016	Matadors	Legends FC
Fall 2016	??	??
Spring 2017	NTX Rayados	
Fall 2017	Legends FC	TXWarriorsFC
Spring 2018	??	??
Fall 2018	Season cancelled	Season cancelled
Spring 2019		Provident FC

Team	Titles won
Legends FC	7 (Fall 2007, Spring 2009, Fall 2009, Fall 2010, Fall 2013, Spring 2014, Fall 2015)
Dallas Roma F.C.	5 (Fall 2006, Spring 2007, Spring 2008, Fall 2008, Spring 2011)
NTX Rayados	5 (Fall 2011, Spring 2012, Fall 2012, Spring 2013, Spring 2017)
Azzurri	1 (Spring 2006)
United	1 (Spring 2010)
Santos FC	1 (Fall 2014)
Matadors	1 (Spring 2016)
