= NTX Rayados =

- Full name: North Texas Rayados
- Founded: 2011; 15 years ago
- Ground: Richland College Soccer Fields
- League: NTPSA Division 1A
- Website: http://ntxrayados.com/

The NTX Rayados are a soccer team based in Dallas, Texas that currently competes in North Texas Premier Soccer League.

== History ==
NTX Rayados plays North Texas Premier Soccer Association, Division 1A since 2011. The team won the NTPSA Division 1A five times (Fall 2011, Spring 2012, Fall 2012, Spring 2013, Spring 2017). The NTX Rayados have played the Lamar Hunt U.S. Open Cup nine times, from 2011 to 2020.

== Year-by-year ==
| Year | Division | League | Regular season | Playoffs | Open Cup |
|---|---|---|---|---|---|
| 2012 | 5 | USASA | | | 1st Round |
| 2013 | 5 | USASA | | | 1st Round |
| 2014 | 5 | USASA | | | 3rd Round |
| 2015 | 5 | USASA | | | 1st Round |
| 2016 | 5 | USASA | | | 1st Round |
| 2017 | 5 | USASA | | | 1st Round |
| 2018 | 5 | USASA | | | 4th Round |
| 2019 | 5 | USASA | | | 2nd Round |

== Honors ==
- NTPSA Division 1A (5) : Fall 2011, Spring 2012, Fall 2012, Spring 2013, Spring 2017
