= Edwin Disang =

Motswana footballer

Personal information
- Full name: Edwin Disang
- Date of birth: 13 July 1980 (age 46)
- Place of birth: Botswana
- Height: 6 ft 0 in (1.83 m)
- Position: Striker

Senior career*
Years	Team	Apps	(Gls)
1996–2003	Mogoditshane Fighters		
2003	Grand View Vikings	19	(7)
2003–2007	Des Moines Menace	61	(27)
2007–	Mogoditshane Fighters		

International career
1999–2001	Botswana	5	(0)
- * Club domestic league appearances and goals

Edwin Disang (born 13 July 1980) is a Motswana footballer who played as a striker. He played for the Botswana national football team under Major David Bright between 1999 and 2001. He subsequently moved to the United States, where he played for Grandview College, later becoming the team's assistant coach.

Disang was head coach at Melbourne Central Catholic High School in Florida, winning a boys' regional championship there in 2013 and reaching the state final four.

As of 2025, Disang works at Stone Magnet Middle School as the soccer coach & coding and pre-engineering teacher.
