= Juan Sastoque =

American soccer player

Personal information
- Date of birth: June 26, 1977 (age 49)
- Place of birth: Brooklyn, New York, U.S.
- Height: 6 ft 2 in (1.88 m)
- Position: Forward

Youth career
- 1995: Cal State Northridge

Senior career*
Years	Team	Apps	(Gls)
1996	DFW Toros		
1997–1998	Dallas Burn	5	(0)
1997	→ Dallas Toros (loan)		
1997	→ El Paso Patriots (loan)	4	(1)
1997	→ Riverboat Gamblers (loan)	9	(1)
1998	→ MLS Pro 40 (loan)	19	(6)
1998	→ Texas Toros (loan)		(1)
1999	Juan Aurich		
2000	CD Badajoz		
2000	Dallas Sidekicks (indoor)	2	(3)
2001	Dallas Knights		
2002	Texas Spurs		
2002	Dallas Sidekicks (indoor)	5	(0)
2003	Cincinnati Riverhawks	27	(5)
2005–2006	Dallas Roma		
2007–2008	Soccer Studio (indoor)		
- * Club domestic league appearances and goals

Juan Sastoque is an American retired soccer player who spent two seasons in Major League Soccer.

Born in New York, Sastoque grew up in California, graduating from El Cajon Valley High School. He attended Cal State Northridge for one year, playing on the men's soccer team in 1995. In 1996, he turned professional with the DFW Toros of the USISL. He was selected as the 1996 USISL Rookie of the Year. In 1997, Sastoque signed a MLS Project 40 contract with Major League Soccer and was assigned to the Dallas Burn. The Burn sent him on loan to the Toros at the beginning of June 1997, to the El Paso Patriots later in June and to the New Orleans Riverboat Gamblers in July. In 1998, Sastoque spent most of the season on loan with the Project 40 team, in addition to a few games with the Toros. The Burn waived Sastoque on November 2, 1998. He then moved to Juan Aurich in the Peruvian Primera División. In 2000, he played for CD Badajoz of the Spanish Segunda División. He returned to the United States in the fall of 2000 to sign with the Dallas Sidekicks of the World Indoor Soccer League. He scored a hat trick in the Sidekicks final game of the regular season, Sastoque's second game with the team. He remained in the Dallas area, playing for the amateur West Dallas Knights in 2001 before rejoining the Toros, now known as the Texas Spurs for the 2002 season. On October 2, 2002, Sastoque rejoined the Sidekicks, now playing in the second Major Indoor Soccer League. The Sidekicks released him on November 14, 2002. In 2003, Sastoque played for the Cincinnati Riverhawks of the USL A-League. He moved back to Texas where he played for Dallas Roma F.C. in both 2005 and 2006. In the fall of 2006, he began playing for Soccer Studio, an indoor team which competed in the Premier Arena Soccer League. Currently enjoys playing soccer with his kids, Logan, Sebastian & Ava and is a professional Real Estate Agent with his wife, Bettina, in Allen, TX. Allen is a suburb of Dallas, TX.
