= Abbey Okulaja =

Major League Soccer referee

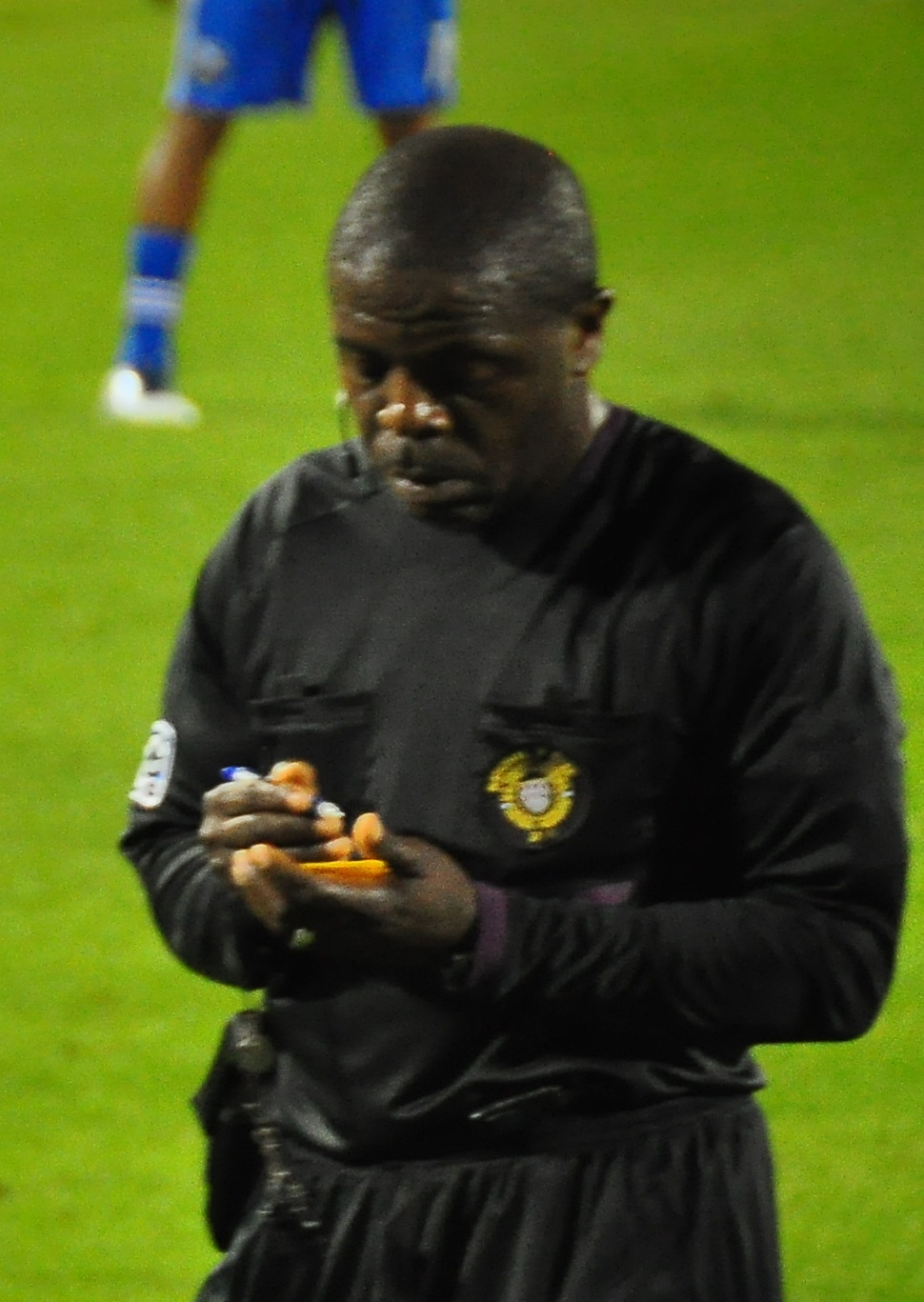
- Okulaja in 2012
- Full name: Abiodun Okulaja
- Born: 1965
- Other occupation: PRO2 Referee Coach

Domestic
Years	League	Role
2003-2012	Major League Soccer	referee

Abbey Okulaja is a former Major League Soccer referee, and was named referee of the year in 2004.

== Career ==
Okulaja made his Major League Soccer debut in 2003, and refereed matches in the league until 2012. He was the referee for the MLS All Star Game in 2006, and was the 4th official for the MLS Cup in 2004. Okulaja was announced the MLS Referee of the Year in 2004.

Okulaja ended his career in 2012, but returned to the field as a replacement official during the 2014 referee lockout. He refereed two matches before the regular officials returned.

After retirement, Abbey Okulaja became a national referee coach with US Soccer and a referee coach with the Professional Referee Organization.
