= Carl Bussey =

American soccer player (born 1978)

Personal information
- Date of birth: October 11, 1978 (age 48)
- Place of birth: Plano, Texas, U.S.
- Height: 5 ft 8 in (1.73 m)
- Position: Forward

Youth career
- 1998–2001: SMU Mustangs

Senior career*
Years	Team	Apps	(Gls)
2002–2003	Dallas Burn	9	(0)
2003	Virginia Beach Mariners	8	(0)
2005	Dallas Roma		

International career
- U.S. U-17
- * Club domestic league appearances and goals

Carl Bussey is an American retired soccer midfielder who played professionally in Major League Soccer and the USL First Division. He played three games for the U.S. at the 1995 FIFA U-17 World Championship.

Bussey graduated from Plano East Senior High School. He attended Southern Methodist University where he was a 1999 and 2000 First Team All American soccer player.

On February 10, 2002, the Dallas Burn selected Bussey in the first round (ninth overall) of the 2002 MLS SuperDraft. He played nine games for Dallas in 2002, but saw no first team game time in 2003 before being released in June. He signed with the Virginia Beach Mariners of the USL First Division for the remainder of the season. In 2005, he played for the amateur Dallas Roma F.C. He also played in the South Korea First Division.

Bussey played three games for the United States men's national under-17 soccer team at the 1995 FIFA U-17 World Championship.
