= Des Moines Menace =

American soccer team based in Iowa

- Full name: Des Moines Menace Soccer Club
- Nicknames: Menace, Red Army
- Founded: 1994; 32 years ago
- Stadium: Mediacom Stadium; Des Moines, Iowa
- Capacity: 14,557
- Owner: Kyle Krause
- Head Coach: Charlie Latshaw III
- League: USL League Two
- 2024: 1st, Heartland Division; Playoffs: Conference Semifinal
- Website: menacesoccer.com
Home colors

Des Moines Menace is an American soccer team based in Des Moines, Iowa, United States. Founded in 1994, the team plays in USL League Two, the fourth tier of the United States soccer league system. The Menace have had sustained success in USL League Two during their tenure, claiming the USL League Two championship in the 2021 campaign. The Menace also hold three regular season championships, coming in the 2018, 2019, and 2021 campaigns respectively.

Beginning with 2026 season, the team plays its home games at Mediacom Stadium on the campus of Drake University in Des Moines. For many years, the Menace played at Valley Stadium in West Des Moines, Iowa. The team's colors are red, white and black.

== History ==
=== The early years (1994–1999) ===
Des Moines Menace began their competitive life as an expansion team in the old United States Interregional Soccer League (USISL), playing in the Midwest Division. They finished their first season in 1994 with a 5–13 record, in seventh place behind divisional champions Minnesota Thunder. They dropped down to the USISL Premier League in 1995, and finished third in the Central Division with a 10–8 record behind divisional champs and Iowa neighbors Sioux City Breeze, qualifying for the post-season playoffs in the process. They dispatched the Austin Lone Stars 3–2 in overtime in the divisional semi-final, and then overcame Sioux City 1–0 in the Divisional Final to progress to the national finals tournament. Menace lost the national semi final 3–1 to Florida outfit Cocoa Expos, and they then lost the third place playoff to San Francisco United All-Blacks, but it set the wheels in motion for one of American amateur soccer's most storied franchises; Aaron Leventhal led the attack, scoring 10 goals on the season, while goalkeeper Casey Mann posted an impressive 1.73 GAA rating.

The 1996 campaign was disappointing for Des Moines, finishing with a 7–7 record in the Southern Division, in 5th place behind Austin Lone Stars, and out of the playoffs in the first round following a 1–0 defeat to the Lone Stars. The USISL Premier League became the PDSL in 1997, and again Des Moines finished the Central Division campaign in 4th place behind Nebraskan champs Lincoln Brigade with a 6–1–9 record. The playoffs were slightly more successful, as they surprisingly dispatched Lincoln 4–0 in the divisional semi finals, and overcame the Omaha Flames 6–0 in the divisional finals, before falling to 3–0 to the Mid-Michigan Bucks in the national quarter finals.

1998 saw an improvement in regular season play from the Iowans, as they finished second in the Central Division behind the Colorado Comets with a 9–4–3 record, and qualified for the post-season for the fourth consecutive time. They beat Twin Cities Tornado 1–0 in overtime in the divisional semi-finals, and then dispatched Kansas City Brass on penalty kicks in the divisional final to reach the national tournament once more; Menace again faced Cocoa Expos in the regional round, but this time emerged from the encounter 3–1 winners, and were now just 90 minutes from the championship game. Des Moines' opponents were the on form San Gabriel Valley Highlanders from Glendale, California, who won 3–1 and went on to take the title, while Menace were left to console themselves with a 4–1 win over Kalamazoo Kingdom in the 3rd/4th place playoff.

The PDSL became the PDL in 1999, but Des Moines were unable to capitalize on their playoff run from the previous year; they ended the season fourth in the Heartland Division behind Twin Cities Tornado, and with the change in the playoff qualification system missed the post-season for the first time in five seasons. The Menace missed the playoffs again in 2000, finishing the season with a 10–0–8 record, just one point behind the Rockford Raptors. The PDL qualification rules were changed again prior to the 2001 season which meant that, despite Menace finishing second to Sioux Falls Spitfire in the Heartland Division, they made it all the way to the national semi-finals, before eventually falling 5–1 to eventual national champions Westchester Flames.

=== 2000s Success (2000–2003) ===
Logo used from 2002-2023.

2002 was a banner year for Des Moines, who had a tremendous regular season, winning during the entire season, and topping the Heartland Division by twenty points from their closest rivals, Boulder Rapids Reserve, and in the process winning the first silverware in franchise history. Their form also took the Menace to the US Open Cup for first time in franchise history. They beat the D3 Pro League side New Jersey Stallions 3–1 in the First Round, before losing 3–2 to A-League stalwarts Rochester Raging Rhinos on a Lenin Steenkamp golden goal. However, during the Central Conference Semifinals they lost to the Mid-Michigan Bucks; despite the early exit, Menace's Czech striker Tomas Boltnar was awarded the PDL MVP award, the PDL Rookie of the Year awards, and was the league's top scorer with twenty four goals, while head coach Laurie Calloway was named Coach of the Year.

Calloway left his manager's post in the 2002–03 offseason to become head coach of the Syracuse Salty Dogs in the A-League, and he was replaced by Greg Petersen. Petersen's season in charge was a generally good one; Menace got off to a flying start, rattling off six wins on the trot at the beginning of the year, including a 7–0 demolition of Wisconsin Rebels and a 4–1 thrashing of St. Louis Strikers. Once again, Menace's excellent early form took them to the US Open Cup for the second consecutive season, although their campaign was a short one as they fell 2–1 at home to Milwaukee-based USASA side Bavarian SC. Menace stuttered a little in June, losing both their matchups against Boulder Rapids Reserve, but still putting 10 goals past Sioux Falls Spitfire in their two meetings, with Boltnar scoring four. The goalscoring highlight of the year was the astonishing 8–2 win over Kansas City Brass at home in early July in which Joseph Kabwe scored five goals, and Boltnar scored a hat trick. Des Moines coasted down the home stretch, winning two of their last four games, eventually finishing in second place in the Heartland Division behind Chicago Fire Premier. Des Moines' trip to the post-season was a short one, as they fell to Great Lakes champions Mid-Michigan Bucks in the Conference Semifinals. Boltnar was named PDL MVP for the second consecutive year, and again was Menace's top scorer with 14 goals, while Boltnar and Joseph Kabwe registered 10 assists apiece.

=== Coaching rotations and Heartland success (2004–2006) ===
Despite the team's success, head coach Petersen was replaced by Marc Grune prior to the 2004 season; under his tenure the team suffered slightly, as league expansion in the Midwest took its toll. Menace were inconsistent in the first part of the year, winning three and losing three of their opening six games. They put five past the Wisconsin Rebels and Sioux Falls Spitfire, but uncharacteristically conceded three at home to the St. Louis Strikers. The month of June was magnificent for Menace, as they enjoyed a seven-game winning streak that featured a two six-goal hammerings of Wisconsin Rebels and Indiana Blast. Everything looked to be on course for another trip to the post season, but Menace inexplicably fell apart during the run-in, losing three of their final five games, including a devastating 5–4 loss to Thunder Bay Chill in which the Canadians scored a last-minute winner having been down 4–3 with 20 minutes to go. The end of season stutter cost Des Moines dearly, as they eventually finished the year third in the Heartland Division behind Chicago Fire Premier and out of the playoffs. Boltnar was Menace's top scorer, with 9 goals, while Edwin Disang contributed 7 assists.

Grune paid for his failure with his job, as Menace hired former standout goalkeeper Casey Mann as their new head coach. Mann's impact on the Menace was felt almost immediately; they started the season six wins in seven games, including a 5–1 hammering of Kansas City Brass, a 3–0 win on the road over Colorado Springs Blizzard, and a 3–0 victory at home over their increasingly bitter rivals Thunder Bay Chill. Once again, Des Moines' excellent early form took them to the US Open Cup, and on their first cup run: they beat USL Second Division side Pittsburgh Riverhounds on penalties in the first round, USL First Division side Charleston Battery 3–2 in the second round, and absolutely destroyed USL First Division's Atlanta Silverbacks 5–1 in a game which saw Michael Kraus hit a brace. Menace played their first ever competitive match against a Major League Soccer team in the fourth round, away at the Kansas City Wizards, and although the fairytale was ended by a comprehensive 6–1 defeat, it was testament to Des Moines' increasingly high standard of play that they got as far as they did. Back in PDL league play, and despite a couple of mid-season losses, both to Thunder Bay, Des Moines continued to provide value for money and goalscoring prowess as the season reached its conclusion: they hit Sioux Falls Spitfire for ten in their two games in early July, with Boltnar and Disangagain doing the damage, and coasted into the playoffs off the back of a 5–0 final day demolition of nine-man Colorado Springs Blizzard, with another two goals from Disang. The Menace faced Great Lakes Division winners Chicago Fire Premier in the Central Conference Semifinals, and walked away with a resounding 4–0 victory; they then took the conference title with ease, outplaying the Michigan Bucks to the tune of a comprehensive 4–1 scoreline. Menace moved on to the national stage for the first time since 2001, and beat Western Conference champions Orange County Blue Star 2–1 to reach the 2005 PDL Championship game. Their opponents were Southern Conference champions El Paso Patriots and, after a tight 0–0 in regulation time, Des Moines triumphed 6–5 on penalty kicks to take their first PDL title, with Andy Gruenebaum making two vital saves, and Luke Frieberg converting the winning spot kick. Boltnar was Menace's top player on all parts of the pitch for the third straight year, with 10 goals and 10 assists.

Des Moines began 2006 looking to defend their PDL title, and began the season in the best possible way, rattling off six wins in their first seven games, including a trio of impressive home wins, 3–0 over Colorado Springs Blizzard, 5–1 over Sioux Falls Spitfire and 4–1 over Thunder Bay Chill, the latter of which featured a brace from Armin Mujdzic. Menace enjoyed their fourth US Open Cup campaign off the back of their early form, and for the second year in a row they proved to be formidable opponents for higher league opposition. They beat the Milwaukee-based USASA team Croatian Eagles 4–1 in the qualifying round, and a second amateur team – Dallas Mustang Legends – in the first round proper, before causing a huge upset by knocking out USL First Division powerhouse Minnesota Thunder in the second round 1–0, with the winning goal being scored by Boltnar. In the third round, Menace faced off against the Wizards in the third round second consecutive season; this year, they would hang in the match until Scott Sealy won it in stoppage time. The mid-season saw a slight stutter from Des Moines as they lost three of their next four games, including a pair of demoralizing losses to Boulder Rapids Reserve which would eventually decide the divisional title. Menace did bounce back down the home stretch, remaining unbeaten in their final five regular season games, but the results included two ties against the St. Louis Lions, which left the Rapids ten points clear of Menace at the top of the Heartland Division standings. Menace faced Great Lakes division champions Chicago Fire Premier in the Central Conference Semifinal; the game was an epic one, with Menace hanging on for a 1–1 tie at the end of regular time despite being a man short following a red card. Extra time saw the Menace fight back from two goals down to force penalty kicks after a 3–3 tie; however, the Menace lost the penalty shootout 5–3, ending their title defense. Once more, Boltnar and Disang led the scoring tables with 7 goals each.

=== Post title struggles and resurgence (2007–2009) ===
2007 did not go the way of The Red Army, as the Iowans missed the playoffs for just the second time in seven seasons. Everything started brightly for Des Moines with a 5–0 opening day victory of Sioux Falls Spitfire, but fell apart quickly, as Menace slumped to an unprecedented three consecutive losses in their next three games. Unusually, it was Des Moines' road form which proved to be their downfall: they suffered unexpected defeats to St. Louis Lions and Thunder Bay Chill, including a 4–0 battering at the hands of the latter in the penultimate game of the season. Menace's home form continued to be impressive, and they enjoyed several high-scoring victories in front of their fans, including a 5–1 thrashing of Kansas City Brass, and an easy 8–0 flattening of the torrid Springfield Demize in which Tucker Sindlinger and Nicki Paterson scored two goals each. However, the lack of consistency in Des Moines' play left them a distant fourth in the table, eight points behind divisional champions Thunder Bay. For the sixth straight year Boltnar was the team's joint top scorer, sharing the honors with Nicki Paterson with 9 goals each.

Des Moines began 2008 sluggishly; they won just two of their opening six games (although one of those was a 7–0 hammering of Springfield Demize) and were left playing catch-up behind Colorado Rapids U23's and Thunder Bay Chill for the remainder of the season. The Menace won three games in June, including a hugely satisfying 3–1 on the road in Thunder Bay, but suffered two unexpected home losses to their closest rivals before enjoying their second win over Thunder Bay, a comprehensive 5–1 home victory in front of 3,217 delirious fans. In a very tight run-in, Des Moines beat Springfield Demize 2–0 on the road, but then were made to endure two ties in their final two regular season games, which meant their playoff fate was out of their hands. Their third-place finish meant that the Great Lakes Division game between Michigan Bucks and Toronto Lynx would determine the final standings; Michigan won the game, and in doing so finished with the best record in the Central Conference, which meant Toronto got in as the lucky third placed team, and Des Moines missed out in the closest of circumstances. For the first time in seven years Boltnar was not Menace's top scorer – that honor went to Nicki Paterson with 6 goals, although the 29-year-old Czech player did tally 5 assists.

2009 would see the retirement of the legendary Boltnar, the announcement of the end of the Mann era, and the first divisional title for the Menace since 2002. The Menace would open with three consecutive wins before drawing three consecutive matches where they would concede late goals for the draw. A draw and win at defending PDL champion Thunder Bay put Des Moines well in control of the Heartland Division, and the Menace would run their unbeaten streak to 15 matches dating over a year before finally falling at home to Thunder Bay. The Menace would finish the regular season 11–1–4. A 2–1 victory over Real Colorado would send Des Moines to the quarterfinals, where they would fall at home, 1–0, to Cary. The 2009 squad featured a balanced attack where eighteen different players scored over the course of sixteen league matches, with no player tallying more than Armin Mujdzic's five.

=== 2010s and USL (2010–2019) ===
The 2010 season started off seemingly like a potential title repeat with the Menace racing to a 4–1–0 start and qualifying for the Open Cup for the first time in four years. However, four straight league ties broke up the team's momentum. The Menace then stepped away from PDL play to host 2nd division AC St. Louis in first round play of the Open Cup, where they suffered a heartbreaking 1–0 loss. A 7–2 shellacking at arch-rival Thunder Bay was followed by two more draws. Despite a pair of dominating shutouts (6–0 against Springfield and 3–0 against the Brass), a 3–1 loss to the Chill all but knocked the Menace from playoff contention. The season ended on a fitting note: after rallying to take a 2–1 lead on the Lions, the Menace conceded late for their 7th draw of the year. Despite losing just three matches all season, seven draws in sixteen matches left them eight points out of playoff qualification in fourth. Captain Clark Bradford and defender Logan McDaniel shared the scoring lead with five goals each.

The 2011 season saw the Menace finish unbeaten in the regular season (12–0–4). In a tight playoff race (the top three clubs finished twenty points clear of the fourth-place team), the Menace edged out Real Colorado on head-to-head. However, in the playoffs, they would concede a late goal to force extra time against the Michigan Bucks and lose, 3–2, in extra time.

In 2012, once again they engaged in a close battle with Colorado for the second playoff spot behind Thunder Bay. A dramatic late victory against the Chill would keep the Menace's hopes alive, but they fell one point short of the Foxes for the final spot. After the season, it was announced that Calloway would be parting ways with the club again.

The 2013 season—the 20th season of Menace Soccer—was highlighted by a run to the third round of the U.S. Open Cup. On May 28, the Menace visited Sporting Park, losing against Sporting Kansas City in a 2–0 match played in front of more than 15,000 fans. This showdown with a Major League Soccer team was made possible by the Menace's 1–0 upset at Minnesota United FC one week earlier. Captain Brandon Fricke headed in the match's only goal on May 21, and the Menace held on to knock off the North American Soccer League side.

The Menace entered the 2013 season under the direction of a new head coach, Mike Jeffries, and a new general manager, Matt Homonoff. The season of highs and lows ended with a 6–6–2 regular-season record—the team's first nonwinning record since 1999. For the second-straight year, the team missed the PDL playoffs.

In 2014, the Menace's 12–1–1 record was the best in the PDL and they won the Heartland Division title. They lost the Central Conference Final to the eventual PDL Champion Michigan Bucks 2–0. Mike Jeffries was named PDL Coach of the Year and Forward Chris Hellmann was named to the All-League team.

Mike Jeffries left to become head coach of the Charlotte Independence, a USL Pro expansion team. Original Chicago Fire Premier head coach Mike Matkovich was hired as head coach on February 5, 2015.

On January 5, 2017, John Pascarella, formerly goalkeeper coach for Sporting Kansas City, was named head coach.

In April 2019, Mark McKeever was announced as new head coach of the Menace, replacing departing Alen Marcina. The Menace were also part of the rebranding of the former PDL into USL League Two.

=== COVID-19 and league championship (2020–present) ===
Following a cancelled 2020 USL League Two season, the Menace embarked on what would be a historic 2021 season. Winning their first nine consecutive games, the Menace spent most of the season on top of the league rankings. Falling just once at an away game in Chicago, the Menace finished the season 11–1–0 as both Heartland Division champions and USL2 regular-season champions. The Menace entered the playoffs as the No. 1 overall seed, and dominated Texas United 5–0, followed by a tense 1–0 victory over Flint City to qualify for the Central Conference Final. Sticking to their winning ways, the Menace triumphed over Kalamazoo FC 2–1 to claim the Central Conference Title. Just two days later, the Menace faced Portland Timbers U23 in the National Semifinal and emerged with a 2–0 victory. In the final playoff match of the 2021 season, the Menace put one goal past NC Fusion U23, which was enough to secure their second league title. Each of their playoff matches were hosted at Valley Stadium in West Des Moines, with the league final breaking both a club and league attendance record with 7,342 fans in attendance. Manel Busquets was named MVP of the match.

In 2022, the team once again made a run in the playoffs after completing an undefeated regular season under first year Head Coach Dean Johnson. However, the team ultimately fell to Flint City in the Elite 8 round in penalty kicks. Johnson was named USL2 Coach of the Year. The team set a record winning 30 consecutive home games in 2023. They qualified for the playoffs yet again as well reaching the Elite 8 before being defeated by Flint City in back-to-back seasons, losing 2–0. On November 16, 2023, Troy McKerrell was named as the thirteenth head coach in club history. McKerrell is a former Menace player who had most recently coached Chicago City to the USL League Two Round of 16 in the 2023 season.

The 2024 season was another successful campaign. They made a run in the playoffs but lost to Peoria in penalties.

In 2025, the Menace went on to win the Great Plains Division and clinch a spot in the playoffs. However, they fell to Sueno FC 4-2 in the quarterfinals at Valley Stadium.

Beginning with the 2024 U.S. Open Cup, the Menace recruited former Major League Soccer players to play in the tournament's early rounds, which take place before the USL League Two season begins. Eight former professional players signed to play for Des Moines in the 2025 U.S. Open Cup, including Sacha Kljestan for his second campaign and fellow MLS media analysts Bradley Wright-Phillips and Osvaldo Alonso.

=== USL Pro Iowa (Future) ===
On September 18, 2019, Menace owner Kyle Krause announced plans to bring a USL Championship team to Des Moines, pending construction of a downtown stadium. Said USL President Jake Edwards, “There is very strong local ownership and a huge appetite for professional soccer. All that’s remaining now is the development of a soccer-specific stadium, and once that occurs, we look forward to delivering a professional soccer club that this community can be proud of.” On January 27, 2022, USL officially awarded Des Moines a USL Championship expansion club, originally set to play its inaugural season in 2024. However, a series of delays set the project back by several years. On December 8, 2025, the club announced that the plan for a new stadium was back on track, with the city approving additional funding. On August 26, 2026, the city of Des Moines announced they were pulling funding from the project. In a news release provided to KCCI, the city pointed to recent legislation at the statehouse as one factor that ended negotiations.

"Recent property tax legislation leading to a $12 million budget gap for the City in Fiscal Year 2028 and a further $5 million gap the following year have changed the City’s negotiating position," the release states, "leaving a significant funding gap for the proposed stadium district that the City can no longer responsibly commit to."

== Players ==
=== Current squad ===
As of April 2025

Note: Flags indicate national team as defined under FIFA eligibility rules; some limited exceptions apply. Players may hold more than one non-FIFA nationality.

No.	Pos.	Nation	Player
2	DF	BRA	Lucas Rosa
3	DF	USA	Mikey Ambrose
4	DF	USA	Matt Hedges
5	MF	USA	Kyle Owen
6	MF	CUB	Osvaldo Alonso
7	DF	USA	Tommy Thompson
8	MF	MEX	Víctor Ulloa
9	MF	IRQ	Justin Meram
10	MF	USA	Benny Feilhaber
11	MF	JPN	Yoshiya Okawa
12	MF	USA	Felipe Hernández

No.	Pos.	Nation	Player
13	MF	USA	Dax McCarty
14	MF	USA	Cade Hagan
16	MF	USA	Sacha Kljestan
17	MF	USA	Elton Chifamba
19	FW	USA	Leroy Enzugusi
20	DF	GUM	A. J. DeLaGarza
25	DF	USA	Donny Toia
26	FW	ENG	Bradley Wright-Phillips
29	DF	GUA	Moisés Hernández
42	GK	USA	Enzo Carvalho

=== Notable former players ===
This list of notable former players comprises players who went on to play professional soccer after playing for the team in the Premier Development League, USL2, or those who previously played professionally before joining the team.

- (United States) Tom Barlow
- (Lebanon) Joey Batrouni
- (United States) Matt Bobo
- (United States) Danny Cruz
- (Botswana) Edwin Disang
- (United States) Tighe Dombrowski
- (United States) Zeke Dombrowski
- (Canada) Edson Edward
- (United States) Joe Germanese
- (South Africa) Neathan Gibson
- (United States) Andy Gruenebaum
- (United States) Garrett Halfhill
- (Saint Vincent and the Grenadines) Ezra Hendrickson
- (Zimbabwe) Joseph Kabwe
- (United States) Brent Kallman
- (United States) Michael Kraus
- (United States) Leonard Krupnik
- (Scotland) Barry Lavety
- (Jamaica) Shawn-Claud Lawson
- (England) Mickey Lewis
- (United States) Chris Mueller
- (Zimbabwe) Eddie Mukahanana
- (United States) Lamar Neagle
- (United States) Matt Nickell
- (United States) Dan O'Brien
- (Scotland) Nicki Paterson
- (United States) Andrew Putna
- (New Zealand) Stu Riddle
- (United States) Joe Salem
- (Brazil) Andre Shinyashiki
- (Scotland) Kevin Souter
- (United States) Josh Wicks
- (United States) Chase Wileman

== Team record: year-by-year ==
Year	Division	League	Regular season	Playoffs	Open Cup	Avg. attendance
1994	3	USISL	7th, Midwest	did not qualify	did not enter	67
1995	4	USISL Premier League	3rd, Central	4th Place	did not qualify	234
1996	4	USISL Premier League	5th, Southern	Conference Semifinals	did not qualify	806
1997	4	USISL PDSL	3rd, Central	Conference Quarterfinals	did not qualify	576
1998	4	USISL PDSL	2nd, Central	3rd Place	did not qualify	789
1999	4	USL PDL	4th, Heartland	did not qualify	did not qualify	1,226
2000	4	USL PDL	3rd, Heartland	did not qualify	did not qualify	2,356
2001	4	USL PDL	2nd, Heartland	3rd Place	did not qualify	2,626
2002	4	USL PDL	1st, Heartland	Conference Semifinals	2nd Round	4,402
2003	4	USL PDL	2nd, Heartland	Conference Semifinals	1st Round	3,971
2004	4	USL PDL	3rd, Heartland	did not qualify	did not qualify	4,415
2005	4	USL PDL	2nd, Heartland	PDL Champions	4th Round	4,112
2006	4	USL PDL	2nd, Heartland	Conference Semifinals	3rd Round	3,927
2007	4	USL PDL	4th, Heartland	did not qualify	did not qualify	3,589
2008	4	USL PDL	3rd, Heartland	did not qualify	did not qualify	3,364
2009	4	USL PDL	1st, Heartland	Conference Final	did not qualify	3,837
2010	4	USL PDL	4th, Heartland	did not qualify	1st Round	3,488
2011	4	USL PDL	2nd, Heartland	Conference Semifinals	1st Round (*)	3,372
2012	4	USL PDL	3rd, Heartland	did not qualify	did not qualify	3,474
2013	4	USL PDL	3rd, Heartland	did not qualify	3rd Round	3,137
2014	4	USL PDL	1st, Heartland	Conference Final	3rd Round	3,340
2015	4	USL PDL	1st, Heartland	Conference Semifinals	2nd Round	—
2016	4	USL PDL	1st, Heartland	Conference Final	3rd Round	2,856
2017	4	USL PDL	2nd, Heartland	Conference Final	1st Round	—
2018	4	USL PDL	1st, Heartland	Conference Final	did not qualify	—
2019	4	USL League Two	1st, Heartland	Conference Semifinals	2nd Round	—
2020	4	USL League Two	Season cancelled due to COVID-19 pandemic			
2021	4	USL League Two	1st, Heartland	USL2 Champions	Cancelled	—
2022	4	USL League Two	1st, Deep North	Conference Final	2nd Round	—
2023	4	USL League Two	2nd, Heartland	Conference Final	2nd Round	—
2024	4	USL League Two	1st, Heartland	Conference Semifinal	2nd Round	—
2025	4	USL League Two	1st, Heartland	Conference Quarterfinals	2nd Round	—
2026	4	USL League Two	3rd, Heartland	Did not qualify	1st Round	—

(*) competing as Iowa Menace

== Honors ==
=== Premier Development League / USL League Two ===
- League champions (2): 2005, 2021
- Regular-season champions (5): 2002, 2014, 2018, 2019, 2021
- Central Conference champions (2): 2005, 2021
- Division champions (11)
  - Central Division champions (2): 1995, 1998
  - Heartland Division champions (8): 2002, 2009, 2014, 2015, 2016, 2018, 2019, 2021
  - Deep North Division champions (1): 2022
- PDL Organization of the Year (1): 2009

== Head coaches ==
- (United States) Blair Reid (1994)
- (United States) Blair Reid and Doug Mello (1995)
- (United States) Blair Reid (1996–1997)
- (United States) Al Driscoll (1998–2000)
- (England) Laurie Calloway (2001–2002)
- (United States) Greg Petersen (2003)
- (United States) Marc Grune (2004)
- (United States) Casey Mann (2005–2009)
- (England) Laurie Calloway (2010–2012)
- (United States) Mike Jeffries (2013–2014)
- (United States) Mike Matkovich (2015–2016)
- (United States) John Pascarella (2017)
- (United States) Alen Marcina (2018)
- (Scotland) Mark McKeever (2019–2021)
- (England) Dean Johnson (2022–2023)
- (Scotland) Troy McKerrell (2024)
- (United States) Charlie Latshaw III (2025-)

== Stadiums ==
- Stadium at Dowling Catholic High School; West Des Moines, Iowa (1994)
- Cara McGrane Memorial Stadium; Des Moines, Iowa (1995–2004)
- Waukee Stadium; Waukee, Iowa (2005–2007)
- Valley Stadium; West Des Moines, Iowa (2008–2018, 2021–2025)
- Drake Stadium; Des Moines, Iowa (2019)
- Mediacom Stadium; Des Moines, Iowa (2026–present)

In their early days, the Menace played their home matches on the soccer fields of Dowling Catholic High School in West Des Moines, with very limited bleachers and no lights. To meet league stadium requirements, the Menace moved to Cara McGrane Memorial Stadium, located on the campus of Herbert Hoover High School on the west side of Des Moines. With bleachers and lights at their new home, the Menace were able to push games to evenings instead of summer afternoons.

Attendance skyrocketed at McGrane Stadium. After averaging a mere 67 fans in their inaugural season and between 234 and 341 from 1995 to 1997, attendance passed 2,000 in 2001 and hit a record 4,415 fans/match in the final season at McGrane, 2004.

Buoyed by the increasing attendance averages (far and away the league leaders), the Menace began making plans to build a soccer-specific stadium. The proposed Liberty Bank Stadium would have been a 6,000 seater capable of hosting team, youth, and international matches. However, a land negotiation with western suburb Urbandale broke down and the Menace were unable to find another interested party.

With plans for a new stadium collapsing, the Menace moved to Waukee Stadium in nearby Waukee for the 2005 season, where they remained through 2007. Attendance was in the high 3000s to low 4000s at Waukee Stadium. The Menace also played home matches at Coach Cownie Stadium on the south side of Des Moines when Waukee Stadium had conflicts in the preseason.

For the 2008 season, Menace relocated to Valley Stadium in nearby West Des Moines.

The Menace moved to historic Drake Stadium for the 2019 season. This was the first time the team played in Des Moines proper since 2004.

Starting in 2021, the Menace returned to Valley Stadium in West Des Moines after playing one season at Drake Stadium.

In late 2025, the team announced that it was moving from Valley Stadium to Mediacom Stadium in Des Moines.
