= Julian Osgood Field =

American novelist

- Born: 1852; Stockbridge, Massachusetts, United States
- Died: 1925 (aged 72–73)
- Occupation: Short story writer
- Writing career
- Pen name: X.L.
- Period: 1893–1925
- Genre: Horror fiction
- Movement: Decadent movement

Julian Osgood Field (1852–1925) was an American socialite and writer. Some of his works were published under the pseudonyms X.L. or Sigma.

== Biography ==
Julian Osgood Field was born on April 23, 1852, the son of Maunsell Bradhurst Field (1822–75), who was an official of the US Treasury under Abraham Lincoln, and Julia Field (née Stanton). Educated in England, he lived largely in London and Paris and became an intimate of the future King Edward VII of Great Britain. Field used the pseudonym "X.L." (or "Sigma") to write decadent horror fiction. His anonymously authored books of recollections have been mined by biographers.

Despite his background, Field was a crook, moneylender's tout, and undischarged bankrupt, pursued by many creditors. In 1901 he was sentenced to three months in prison for forging a document under the signature of a representative of Lord Astor's estate office which claimed he was to be paid a large sum of money for authoring society novels. Field used the document in an attempt to raise a loan.

He was responsible for involving Lady Ida Sitwell, mother of Osbert Sitwell, Sacheverell Sitwell and Edith Sitwell in a long-running financial scandal, which began in 1912. In 1914, Lady Ida successfully sued Field for fraud and breach of duty. The following year, she was imprisoned for three months, and Field for 18 months, for conspiring to defraud another wealthy lady, Francis Bennett Dobbs.

== Fiction bibliography ==
- 1893 "A Kiss of Judas" published in The Pall Mall Magazine, July 1893
  reprinted in Vampyres: Lord Byron to Count Dracula, ed. Christopher Frayling (London: Faber, 1991)
- 1893 "The Luck of the Devil" published in The Pall Mall Magazine, October 1893
- 1894 Aut Diabolus Aut Nihil and Other Tales (London: Methuen & Co.)
- 1896 The Limb: An Episode of Adventure (A.D. Innes)
- 1898 With All the Powders of the Merchant published in The Pall Mall Magazine, September to December 1898

== Non-fiction bibliography ==
- 1893 "A Few Words About Jules Sandeau" published in The Pall Mall Magazine, November 1893
- 1924 Things I Shouldn't Tell (London, Eveleigh Nash & Grayson, 1924). (This and the next two items were volumes of often scandalous reminiscences about late Victorian and Edwardian high society. All were published anonymously.)
- 1924 Uncensored Recollections (London, Eveleigh Nash & Grayson, 1924)
- 1925 More Uncensored Recollections (London, Eveleigh Nash & Grayson, 1925)

== Plays ==
- "Society's Verdict", otherwise known as "Found Guilty or the Shadow of Shame". (Shaftesbury Theatre, 1899).

== Works regarding ==
- 1998 "Alas, Poor Ghost" by David G. Rowlands, published in All Hallows #16

== See also ==
- List of horror fiction authors
