= Waukee Stadium =

Multipurpose stadium in Waukee, Iowa

- Warrior Zone
- Interactive map of Waukee Stadium
- Location: 555 SE University Avenue; Waukee, Iowa 50263
- Coordinates: 41°36′14″N 93°52′02″W
- Owner: Waukee Community School District
- Operator: Waukee High School
- Capacity: 7,501
- Surface: FieldTurf (2009-present)

Construction
- Groundbreaking: Unknown
- Opened: 1996
- Architect: Local

Tenants
- Waukee Warriors (WCSD); Des Moines Menace (2004-2007)

Waukee Stadium is a field located in Waukee, Iowa. It is the home field for Waukee High School's football games, soccer games, and track meets.

Along with the high school's sports teams, the stadium is also a locale for a number of the high school's physical education programs. It previously hosted the Des Moines Menace soccer team.

The Waukee Stadium also hosts Waukee's Marching Band invitational called "Waukee Marching Invitational (WMI), and also hosts State contest the same day. In the summer it hosts "Celebration in Brass", a Drum Corp competition. Drum Corps from all over the nation come to compete in "Celebration in Brass".

The stands on the west side of the stadium serve as the home bleachers and the east bleachers for the visitors.

Waukee Stadium is surrounded by Centennial Park which consists of baseball and softball fields, a sand volleyball court, and a frisbee golf course.

Waukee High School is a Class 4A school in the CIML conference. The school is located just east of the stadium. Waukee Stadium has also hosted Waukee Raven football games, and in 2005 Drake University played a football game there while their stadium was being renovated.

In 2008, a large new wing was built in the north endzone.

In 2009, Waukee Stadium was renovated. The natural turf was replaced with FieldTurf, the old black track was taken out and a new purple one was installed. Also, a building was constructed, closing off the south side of the stadium. This new building consists of 3 locker rooms, meeting rooms, a training room, and a visitors' concession stand. In 2009, the stadium was used for the 5th grade field day. It is the fourth largest high school stadium in the state. The third largest high school stadium in the state is Valley Stadium (capacity of 8,000), behind Brady Street Stadium in Davenport (10,000) and Kingston Stadium in Cedar Rapids (15,000).
