= Junior Zarate =

Mexican footballer (born 1978)

Personal information
- Full name: Juvenal Zarate
- Date of birth: December 24, 1978 (age 47)
- Place of birth: Degollado, Mexico
- Height: 5 ft 9 in (1.75 m)
- Position: Midfielder

Senior career*
Years	Team	Apps	(Gls)
2001–2007	Wilmington Hammerheads	106	(25)
- * Club domestic league appearances and goals

Juvenal "Junior" Zarate (born December 24, 1978) is a soccer midfielder who played for the USL Second Division side Wilmington Hammerheads.

Zarate was born in Degollado, Mexico. He moved to Tennessee with his family when he was 17 and he spent several years playing in local recreational soccer leagues. In 2001, after a trial, he signed with the Wilmington Hammerheads. In 2003, he was a substitute in the Hammerheads' shock victory against the Dallas Burn of the MLS to progress to the quarter-finals of the U.S. Open Cup. Between the 2005 and 2007 seasons, Zarate made 47 appearances and scored 5 goals in the USL Second Division.
