= Carenza =

Carenza may refer to

== Given name ==
- Carenza, a medieval Occitan composer
- Carenza Lewis (born 1963), English archaeologist

== Surname ==
- Chris Carenza (born 1952), American soccer player
- Joe Carenza Sr. (died 1981), American soccer player
- John Carenza (born 1950), American soccer player
- Ranieri Carenza (born 1963), an Italian long-distance runner

== See also ==
- Karenza (disambiguation)
- Charenza
