= Saint Louis–SIU Edwardsville men's soccer rivalry =

American college soccer rivalry

Saint Louis–SIU Edwardsville soccer rivalry
- Sport: Soccer
- Teams: Saint Louis Billikens; SIU Edwardsville Cougars
- First meeting: November 22, 1969; Saint Louis 4, SIUE 0
- Latest meeting: September 2, 2023; SIUE 2, Saint Louis 0
- Trophy: Joseph Carenza Sr. Trophy "The Bronze Boot"

Statistics
- Total meetings: 41
- All-time series: Saint Louis leads, 27–11–3

The Saint Louis–SIU Edwardsville men's soccer rivalry is an American college soccer rivalry between the Saint Louis University Billikens and Southern Illinois University Edwardsville Cougars. The winner of each year's game receives the Bronze Boot.

== History ==
In the late 1950s through early 1970s, the Saint Louis Billikens men's soccer program was in its golden age, and won all 10 of its NCAA Division I Men's Soccer Championship titles during that span. The program became noteworthy for focusing on recruiting domestic talent from the Saint Louis region rather than other top college programs that were reliant on international recruitment. The talent pool of players from the St. Louis region caused nearby universities such as Quincy, Rockhurst, and SIU Edwardsville to experience strong soccer seasons as well.

After Saint Louis experienced Division I success, SIU Edwardsville also experienced success with their program winning the inaugural Division II national championship in 1972, then moving to Division I and winning that title in 1979. Due to the proximity of the schools, early matches between the schools attracted large crowds to their games. In 1971, the Catholic Youth Council of St. Louis (CYC) initiated the annual Bronze Boot match which would be played for a trophy awarded annually for the regular season match up between SLU and SIUE. The popularity saw crowd sizes that set college soccer records, including the most-attended college soccer match for over 45 years: 22,512 between the two sides on October 30, 1980. This remains the record attendance in college men's soccer, but was broken in 2026 when Georgia hosted James Madison in a women's match at Georgia's football home of Sanford Stadium, drawing 25,433. From 1972 through 1985, the SIUE–SLU games were played at Busch Stadium to accommodate the large crowds.

In 1995, the series ended when SIU Edwardsville's program moved down to Division II along with the school's other sports. In 2007, the Cougars' athletic program was elevated to Division I. With the move, speculation rose about the teams playing again and resuming the series, although it remained dormant for another decade. Despite this, the teams played each other in spring season friendlies and preseason friendlies.

The series resumed when both programs agreed to play in a home-and-home series in 2018 and 2019.

Starting 2023, each edition will again be a single game rather than an alternating home-and-home series and will be held at CityPark, the home field of St. Louis City SC, the MLS club which had its inaugural season that year.

NCAA All-Time Largest Men's Soccer Crowds
#	Date	Opponents	Location	Game	Attendance
1	October 30, 1980	SIUE vs St. Louis	Busch Memorial Stadium, St. Louis, MO	11h Annual Bronze Boot Game	22,512
7	November 9, 1973	SIUE vs St. Louis	Busch Memorial Stadium, St. Louis, MO	4th Annual Bronze Boot Game	20,112
14	November 5, 1972	SIUE vs St. Louis	Busch Memorial Stadium, St. Louis, MO	3rd Annual Bronze Boot Game	≥15,000

== Coach Bob Guelker ==
The Billikens' program was begun as a club program in 1958 by St. Louis U. alumnus Bob Guelker. After going 4–1–0 in that first season, the administration promoted the team to varsity status in 1959. The new team was 11–1–0 and won the inaugural NCAA Soccer Championship. The Billikens defended their title in 1960 and won again in 1962, 1963, and 1965 under Coach Guelker.

In 1966, SIU Edwardsville began establishing an NCAA College Division (now Division II) athletic program. In doing so, SIUE hired away two coaches from St. Louis U.'s higher profile University Division (now Division I) program. Bob Guelker was hired as the Cougars' first soccer coach, and he would later succeed Harry Gallatin as athletic director. As he had done at SLU, Coach Guelker quickly turned his new program into a regional and national power. In their first three seasons of eligibility. the Cougars were in the NCAA Tournament and nationally ranked. 1972 was the first year of the NCAA College Division Men's Soccer Championship. As his Billikens had won the first NCAA title in 1959, Guelker's Cougars won the first College Division/Division II crown in 1972. After the 1972 season, SIU Edwardsville and a number of other schools that emphasized their soccer programs took advantage of a then-current NCAA rule that allowed a Division II school to play one sport in Division I and moved into the higher division. In addition to winning the first NCAA title in 1969 and the first Division II title in 1972, in 1979, Guelker's Cougars won Division I, and he became the first coach to win Division I and II titles and the only coach to win both divisions at the same school.

== Results ==
SLU victories	SIUE victories

No.	Date	Location	Winner	Score	Attendance
1	November 22, 1969†	St. Louis, MO	SLU	4–0	
2	November 7, 1970	Edwardsville, IL	SLU	3–1	
3	November 28, 1970†	Edwardsville, IL	SLU	2–1	
4	November 6, 1971	St. Louis, MO	SLU	2–1	
5	December 4, 1971†	Edwardsville, IL	SLU	3–1	
6	November 5, 1972	Edwardsville, IL	Tie	1–1^{ot}	≥15,000
7	November 9, 1973	St. Louis, MO	SLU	1–0	20,112
8	December 9, 1973†	St. Louis, MO	SLU	3–0	
9	November 8, 1974	St. Louis, MO	SIUE	1–0	
10	November 29, 1974†	St. Louis, MO	SLU	2–1^{3ot}	
11	November 7. 1975	St. Louis, MO	SIUE	2–1	
12	November 29, 1975†	Edwardsville, IL	SIUE	2–1	
13	November 6, 1976	St. Louis, MO	SLU	1–0	
14	November 21, 1976†	Edwardsville, IL	SIUE	2–1	
15	November 4, 1977	St. Louis, MO	SIUE	3–2	
16	November 11, 1978	St. Louis, MO	SLU	1–0	
17	November 19, 1978†	St. Louis, MO	SIUE	3–2^{3ot}	
18	November 2, 1979	St. Louis, MO	SIUE	2–0	
19	November 17, 1979†	Edwardsville, IL	SIUE	2–1	
20	October 30, 1980	St. Louis, MO	SLU	5–1	22,512
21	October 30, 1981	St. Louis, MO	SLU	2–1	
22	October 29, 1982	Edwardsville, IL	SIUE	2–0	

No.	Date	Location	Winner	Score	Attendance
23	October 28, 1983	St. Louis, MO	SLU	3–0	
24	October 26, 1984	St. Louis, MO	SLU	1–0	6,799
25	October 25, 1985	St. Louis, MO	SLU	4–1	4,216
26	November 1, 1986	Edwardsville, IL	SLU	1–0	2,735
27	October 30, 1987	St. Louis, MO	SLU	2–0	1,949
28	October 8, 1988	Edwardsville, IL	SLU	5–0	2,657
29	September 29, 1989	St. Louis, MO	SLU	3–1^{ot}	3,621
30	September 29, 1990	Edwardsville, IL	SLU	3–2	2,424
31	September 27, 1991	St. Louis, MO	SLU	3–2	3,678
32	September 26, 1992	Edwardsville, IL	SLU	1–0^{ot}	1,514
33	September 24, 1993	St. Louis, MO	SLU	3–0	1,729
34	October 15, 1994	Edwardsville, IL	SLU	4–1	1,668
35	September 8, 1995	St. Louis, MO	SLU	4–0	2,944
36	September 21, 2018	St. Louis, MO	Tie	1–1	4,903
37	September 13, 2019	Edwardsville, IL	SLU	2–1^{2ot}	3,107
38	September 14, 2021	St. Louis, MO	Tie	1–1	2,433
39	September 13, 2022	Edwardsville, IL	SLU	4–1	1,849
40	September 2, 2023	St. Louis, MO	SIUE	2–0	8,574
41	September 8, 2024	St. Louis, MO	SIUE	1–0	6,128
42	September 7, 2025	St. Louis, MO	SLU	2–1	2,245
Series: SLU leads 28–11–3

↑ = NCAA Tournament game

Bronze Boot Game series: SLU leads 27-11-3

== See also ==
- Soccer in St. Louis
- Saint Louis Billikens men's soccer
- SIU Edwardsville Cougars men's soccer
