= Soccer in St. Louis =

Soccer in St. Louis, which dates from 1882, includes pro, college, select and prep soccer teams in St. Louis, Missouri, collectively forming one of the nation's richest municipal soccer heritages.

== Roots ==
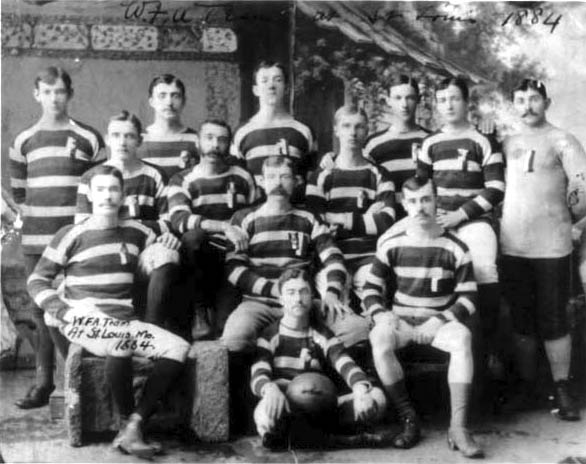
The Western Football Association of Canada team that visited St. Louis in December 1884

One of the earliest soccer games in St. Louis took place on Sunday, February 12, 1882, at 3:25 p.m. The Hurleys defeated the Hornets in front of 2,000 people at Sportsman's Park. The game was played under the "Association Foot-Ball Rules of Great Britain".

== Former professional teams ==
=== St. Louis Soccer League (1907–39) ===
The St. Louis Soccer League, founded in 1907, was the country's only fully professional soccer league of its day. St. Leo's, the league's only fully professional squad, dominated the standings for seven years.

Before 1914, most teams participated only in local competitions. In 1913, the St. Louis Soccer League came to national attention when St. Leo's tied the Paterson True Blues, winners of the American Cup. At the time, the American Cup was the most recognized regional cup and was the de facto East Coast championship.

In 1914, the new United States Football Association established the National Challenge Cup. When the St. Louis teams entered the competition in 1918, it became the first truly national competition; over the next few years, it replaced the regional cups. St. Louis teams initially had difficulty getting past Chicago and Cleveland teams, but in 1920 Ben Millers stunned the East Coast teams by knocking off Fore River to become the first club outside of the northeast to win the cup. SLSL teams went to the next four finals, winning the cup again in 1922. SLSL team also went to the final in 1926, 1929 and every season from 1932 to 1939.

The club Stix, Baer and Fuller F.C. was successful during the 1930s, reaching the finals of the National Challenge Cup for six consecutive years from 1932 to 1937, and winning titles in 1933, 1934, and 1935.

In 1935, the SLSL began to see internal strife, including lawsuits between teams over player tampering, which led in 1939 to its dissolution.

=== Stars (NASL) (1967–77) ===
The St. Louis Stars played from 1967–77 in the North American Soccer League. The team was known for its high concentration of American players, many from the St. Louis area, in contrast to other NASL teams' reliance on foreign players. The team moved to Anaheim in 1978 and became the California Surf.

=== Steamers (MISL) (1979–88) ===
The St. Louis Steamers played in the Major Indoor Soccer League in 1979–88. The league awarded St. Louis a franchise on July 31, 1979, and the home opener on December 14, 1979, drew over 18,000 fans to the team's home field at the St. Louis Arena. Part of the Steamers' attraction was that their roster was drawn in large part from local talent.

Their average seasonal attendance exceeded 12,000 fans from 1980–81 to 1984–85, and reached its peak during the 1981–82 season, when the team averaged 17,107 fans per game, including 19,298 fans in the Steamers' match at the Arena against the Denver Avalanche. They outdrew the NHL's St. Louis Blues in four consecutive seasons: 1980–81 through 1983–84.

In 1981–82, the Steamers won their second straight division title, and reached the MISL Championship finals, where they lost to New York in a five-game series.

The Steamers played their final match on April 15, 1988, in front of 4,839 fans. The club folded after the 1987–88 season, and the MISL terminated the Steamers' franchise.

=== Storm (MISL) (1989–92) ===
The St. Louis Storm were a soccer team based at the St. Louis Arena that played in the Major Indoor Soccer League from 1989 to 1992.

=== Ambush (NPSL) (1992–2000) ===
The St. Louis Ambush was a professional indoor soccer team that played in the National Professional Soccer League from 1992 to 2000. The team was founded in Tulsa, Oklahoma, where they played one season before coming to St. Louis. The Ambush made the playoffs every year that they played in St. Louis, except their final year of 1999–2000. The Ambush won one National Professional Soccer League championship (1994–95 season), defeating the Harrisburg Heat. They played in four NPSL Championship series (1994, 1995, 1998, 1999), losing to the Cleveland Crunch twice (in 1994 and 1999), and to the Milwaukee Wave (1998).

=== Steamers (WISL/MISL) (1998–2006) ===
The second team to use the name, these Steamers played in the World Indoor Soccer League in 2000–01, then in the MISL from the 2003–04 season to the 2005–06 season.

The Steamers were granted a World Indoor Soccer League expansion franchise in December 1998 but did not begin play until the 2000 season. In 2002, the team, along with fellow WISL teams Dallas Sidekicks and San Diego Sockers joined the Major Indoor Soccer League when the two leagues merged.

=== Athletica (WPS) (2009–10) ===
Founded in 2008 by St. Louis native Jeff Cooper, the Saint Louis Athletica competed in Women's Professional Soccer from 2009 to 2010. Athletica initially played its home matches on the campus of Southern Illinois University - Edwardsville, and later moved to Anheuser-Busch Soccer Park in the suburb of Fenton, Missouri. The team folded in May 2010 when English owners brought on by Cooper before the 2010 season stopped funding the team.

=== AC St. Louis (NASL) (2010) ===
Cooper also founded the AC St. Louis, which played its only season in 2010 in the NASL Conference of the temporary Division II Pro League. Wearing green, white, and yellow, A.C. St. Louis also played its home games at the Anheuser-Busch Soccer Park. Its first coach was Claude Anelka, the older brother of French international striker Nicolas Anelka, who was replaced by Dale Schilly midway through the season as a consequence of the same ownership issues that doomed the Athletica. The club planned to join the new North American Soccer League in the 2011 season, but folded in January 2011 after USSF stopped backing the team's finances and new owners were not found.

=== Saint Louis Football Club (USL) (2015–2020) ===
In May 2014, the Division III USL Pro league (now the Division II USL Championship) announced that an expansion franchise would begin play in the 2015 season at the St. Louis Soccer Park in Fenton.

== Current professional teams ==
=== St. Louis Ambush (MISL/MASL, 2013–) ===
The St. Louis Ambush is a professional indoor soccer team based in St. Charles, Missouri. The second team to use this name, the Ambush joined the Major Indoor Soccer League in 2013. In the 2013–14 season, their only season as members of the MISL, the Ambush posted 4–16 record. After the season, the team announced that it would leave the MISL, along with five other teams, to join the MASL.

=== St. Louis City SC (MLS, 2019–) ===
In 1993, the new Major League Soccer league looked at St. Louis and 26 other cities for original franchises, but St. Louis did not ultimately submit a bid.

The city later made several unsuccessful efforts to land a franchise as Major League Soccer expanded from 10 teams in 2004 to 19 teams by 2012. In 2007, the Real Salt Lake team came close to moving to St. Louis until the Utah governor intervened to help build a stadium in Salt Lake City. In 2008, efforts to establish an expansion team in the St. Louis suburb of Collinsville, Illinois, floundered when MLS awarded its 16th franchise to Philadelphia, which opened play in 2010. Later in 2008, St. Louis bid for one of two MLS expansion slots to enter the league in 2011. St. Louis was considered one of the early front runners, due in part to the city's soccer history and a stadium plan. But the St. Louis bid lacked an ownership group with deep pockets, and MLS awarded the expansion slots to Portland and Vancouver.

In 2017, MLS began to consider adding a team in St. Louis, beginning in 2023. The wealthy people who would own the team sought public funds to help build a $200 million soccer-specific stadium next to Union Station in downtown St. Louis. On January 26, 2017, a funding plan was approved by the city's Aldermanic Ways and Means Committee, and later by the entire Board of Aldermen, that would have directed $60 million in city tax revenue to the new stadium. But voters rejected the plan in an April 4, 2017, referendum, leaving the city's MLS future in doubt.

In September 2018, the St. Louis Post-Dispatch reported on a meeting between officials with the Missouri Department of Economic Development and MLS representatives regarding a stadium proposal; St. Louis Mayor Lyda Krewson later confirmed that a new group was trying to bring a team to St. Louis. St. Louis's MLS bid was effectively re-launched on October 9 of that year, with Carolyn Kindle Betz and other heirs to the Enterprise Rent-a-Car fortune as the primary investors. The stadium location remains the same as in the original 2016 location, near Union Station. On November 28, 2018, the Board of Aldermen's Housing, Urban Development, and Zoning Committee unanimously voted 8–0 to approve the stadium plan.

On August 20, 2019, Major League Soccer announced that St. Louis had been granted an expansion team, to start play in 2022.

On August 13, 2020, the St. Louis MLS ownership group announced the official name of the team as St. Louis City SC, along with the crest and colors of the club.

On February 25, 2023, St. Louis City SC played in and won its first match in Major League Soccer by a score of 3–2, against Austin FC at Q2 Stadium in Austin, Texas.

=== St. Louis City 2 (MLS Next Pro, 2021–) ===
On December 6, 2021, MLS and City SC jointly announced that City would field a reserve side, unveiled as St. Louis City 2 (City2), in MLS' revived reserve league of MLS Next Pro starting in 2022. In its first season, City2 played home games at Hermann Stadium at Saint Louis University and Ralph Korte Stadium at Southern Illinois University Edwardsville. Starting in 2023, City SC moved all City2 home games to its home ground of Energizer Park.

== College ==
=== SLU Billikens (NCAA) ===
The Saint Louis University Billikens men's soccer team competes in NCAA Division I in the Atlantic 10 Conference, and play at Hermann Stadium.

The Billikens were dominant in men's collegiate soccer during the late 1950s through the mid-1970s, winning 10 NCAA Division I Men's Soccer Championships, a record that still stands, and making another six NCAA Final Four appearances. During their dynasty run from the 1960s through 1970s, coach Bob Guelker led the team to their first five championships and notched an 89% winning percentage. Harry Keough coached the last five championship teams. SLU's longest winning streaks were 19 games from 1969–70 and 24 games (including 14 consecutive road wins) during 1970–71, plus an unbeaten streak (wins and ties) of 45 games in 1969–71. The Billikens last appeared in an NCAA national championship finals in 1974.

Soccer is the main fall sport at SLU, which has not sponsored American football since 1949. The team consistently ranks among the top of all Division I soccer teams in attendance. The Billikens led the NCAA in average attendance for the 1999, 2001, and 2003 seasons. Dan Donigan was the head coach from February 2001 until January 2010. As of 2016, the Billikens are coached by Mike McGinty.

SLU soccer graduates who went on to play for the U.S. national team or play Division I professional soccer include Brian McBride and Mike Sorber.

=== Southern Illinois University Edwardsville Cougars (NCAA) ===
The SIUE Cougars men's soccer team competes in the NCAA Division I in the Ohio Valley Conference (OVC), and play their home matches on Bob Guelker Field at Ralph Korte Stadium.

The Cougars soccer program entered competition in 1967 under National Soccer Hall of Fame coach Bob Guelker, who led the team to two national championships. Over time they have moved back and forth between Division I and Division II, winning a national championship in each. In Division II, the team has also won six regular-season titles, four conference tournaments; it has received seven invitations to the NCAA Division II tournament, where the team reached the Division II College Cup semifinals three times and were national runner-up in 2004.

Now back in Division I, the team named new head coach Mario Sanchez, formerly associate head coach of the Louisville Cardinals, in 2015.

SIUE's most recent conference move in men's soccer took place in 2023, when its primary home of the OVC launched a men's soccer league for the first time.

==== Record attendance ====
Three of the four highest attended NCAA men's soccer regular-season matches of all time were between St. Louis University and SIU Edwardsville at the second Busch Stadium in St. Louis (22,512 in 1980, 20,122 in 1973, and 15,000 in 1972).

=== Other schools ===
SLU and SIUE are only two of 14 traditional colleges/universities in the Greater St. Louis area. Lindenwood, located in St. Charles, Missouri, started a transition from NCAA Division II to Division I in 2022, joining the OVC. With the OVC then sponsoring soccer only for women, Lindenwood men's soccer joined the Summit League. After the 2022 season, the OVC added men's soccer and Lindenwood moved that sport to its primary home.

The other 11 area schools compete in men's and women's soccer in either the National Collegiate Athletic Association (NCAA) (Divisions II or III) or the National Association of Intercollegiate Athletics (NAIA).

== Amateur teams ==
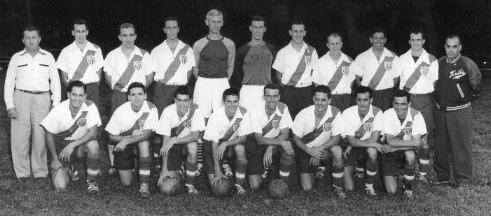
St. Louis Kutis circa 1954.

St. Louis hosted a number of strong amateur teams and leagues that were prominent before the modern professional era. Two teams in particular stand out, Simpkins-Ford and St. Louis Kutis.

=== Simpkins-Ford ===
Simpkins-Ford was an amateur team that went to the U.S. Open Cup in 1948 and 1950, and the team contributed several players to the U.S. national team that competed in the 1948 Olympics and the 1950 FIFA World Cup.

=== St. Louis Kutis ===
St. Louis Kutis was one of the best soccer clubs in the country during the 1950s, winning six consecutive National Amateur Cup titles from 1956 to 1961. Kutis included prominent players Harry Keough, Bob Kehoe, and Bill Looby — each of whom landed in the Hall of Fame. The entire Kutis squad was selected for the roster for the U.S. national team in two qualifying matches for the 1958 FIFA World Cup.

== International friendlies ==
May 24, 2013, St. Louis hosted a friendly between Chelsea and Manchester City with a sell-out crowd of 48,263 at Busch Stadium.

On August 10, 2013, Real Madrid and Inter Milan played a friendly at the Edward Jones Dome in front of 54,184 fans, a record attendance for a soccer match in St. Louis.

On November 18, 2013, the national teams of Bosnia and Herzegovina and Argentina played a match at Busch Stadium.

On May 30, 2014, Bosnia again played in the city at the Edward Jones Dome against Ivory Coast in the Road to Brazil series.

On April 4, 2015, the U.S. Women's National Team hosted New Zealand at Busch Stadium.

On August 1, 2016 AS Roma and Liverpool played a friendly match.

On May 16, 2019, the U.S. Women's National team hosted New Zealand, winning 5 to 0.

On April 11, 2023 the USWNT hosted the Republic of Ireland at Energizer Park, winning 1-0.

On September 9, 2023 the U.S. Men's National team hosted Uzbekistan at Energizer Park, winning 3-0.

== International matches ==
The United States men's national soccer team has played several times in the St. Louis area. On May 16, 1985, they won 2–1 against Trinidad and Tobago in a 1985 CONCACAF Championship match in front of 15,823 fans at Busch Memorial Stadium. On November 13, 2015, the United States played St. Vincent and the Grenadines in the first match of World Cup qualifiers for the 2018 FIFA World Cup at the new Busch Stadium. The United States defeated St. Vincent and the Grenadines 6–1. The official attendance for the game was 43,433.

Energizer Park, the home of St. Louis City SC, hosted its first men's international matches on June 28, 2023: a pair of CONCACAF Gold Cup group stage matches attended by 21,216 spectators. In those matches, Jamaica defeated Trinidad and Tobago 4–1 and the United States won 5–0 against Saint Kitts and Nevis. The stadium will host the United States against Jamaica on November 18, 2024 for their home leg in the 2024–25 CONCACAF Nations League.

The United States women's national team have played six matches in the St. Louis area from 1996 to 2023, including friendlies at the Edward Jones Dome and Busch Stadium.

Energizer Park will host eight Olympic soccer matches during the 2028 Summer Olympics.

== Noted players ==
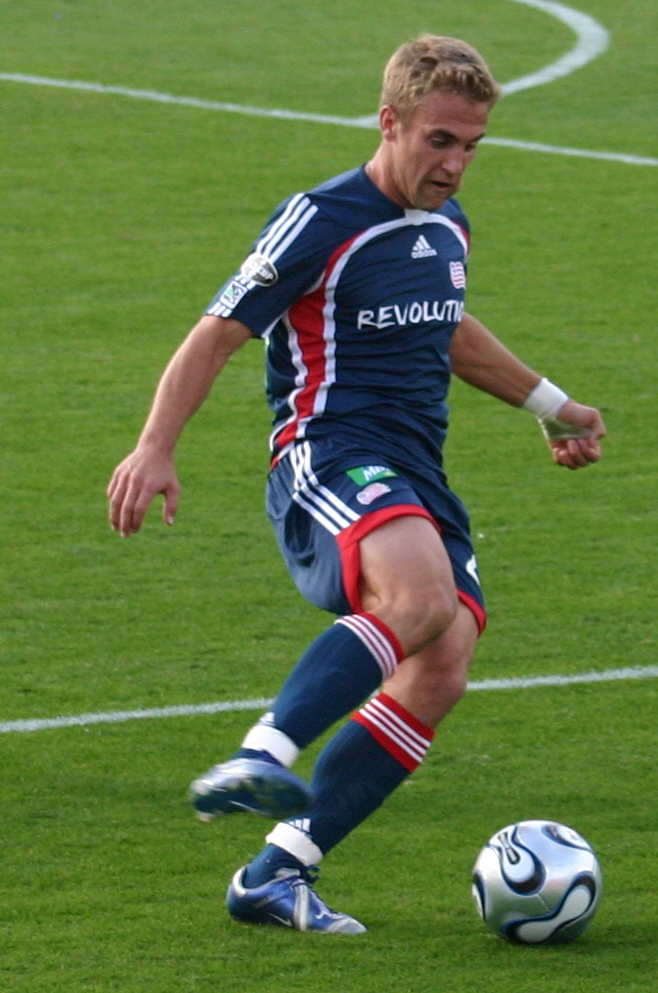
Taylor Twellman, Major League Soccer MVP in 2005.

Twenty-nine St. Louisans have been inducted into the National Soccer Hall of Fame.

The U.S. team for the 1950 World Cup, which defeated England 1–0 in one of the most noted upsets in World Cup history, had five of the eleven players on the team from St. Louis, including many from the historically Italian neighborhood of The Hill. This event was chronicled in the 2005 film The Game of Their Lives (released on DVD as The Miracle Match).

Several current or former Major League Soccer players are from St. Louis, including: Mike Sorber, Chris Klein, Pat Noonan, Jack Jewsbury, Matt Pickens, Brad Davis (#5 in MLS career assists), Steve Ralston (#2 in MLS career assists), Taylor Twellman (MLS MVP 2005), Tim Ream, Matt McKeon, Patrick Schulte, Joe Willis, Brian Kamler, Steve Trittschuh, Bobby Rhine and Will Bruin.

=== St. Louis Soccer Hall of Fame ===
The St. Louis Soccer Hall of Fame, established in 1971, is located at the Midwest Soccer Academy and includes a museum with various exhibits. The first annual dinner was held in 1971.

== See also ==
- Sports in St. Louis
- Soccer in the United States
- History of soccer in the United States
- United States soccer league system
- Bob Hermann
- Craig League
