= 2025 SIU Edwardsville Cougars men's soccer team =

American college soccer season

2025 SIU Edwardsville Cougars men's soccer
- Conference: Ohio Valley Conference
- Record: 6-11-2 (4-4-2 OVC)
- Head coach: Cale Wassermann (7th season)
- Assistant coaches: Jordan Grant; Drew Romig; Alsadiq Hasan
- Home stadium: Ralph Korte Stadium; Capacity, 4,000

2025 Ohio Valley Conference men's soccer standings
	Conf.					Overall
Team	W		L		T	W		L		T
Lindenwood †‡	6	–	2	–	2	14	–	3	–	4
Houston Christian	5	–	3	–	2	11	–	5	–	3
Liberty	4	–	2	–	4	9	–	5	–	6
SIU Edwardsville	4	–	4	–	2	6	–	11	–	2
Western Illinois	3	–	3	–	4	5	–	11	–	4
Eastern Illinois	3	–	4	–	3	4	–	9	–	4
Southern Indiana	1	–	4	–	5	2	–	10	–	5
Incarnate Word	1	–	5	–	4	5	–	7	–	6
† – Conference champion ‡ – 2025 Ohio Valley tournament champion + – At-large invitation to the 2025 NCAA tournament; As of December 6, 2025; Rankings from United Soccer Coaches; Source: OVC

The 2025 SIU Edwardsville Cougars men's soccer team represented Southern Illinois University Edwardsville during the 2025 NCAA Division I men's soccer season, the school's 59th season. The Cougars are coached by Cale Wassermann. The team plays its home games on Bob Guelker Field at the Ralph Korte Stadium as a member of the Ohio Valley Conference (OVC).

== Preseason ==
The Cougars returned fourteen players from 2024 as well as three redshirts. They were joined by six freshmen and five transfers from other schools. None of the Cougars' top seven scorers from 2024 return, but most of the defenders do.

Following consecutive Ohio Valley Conference regular season and tournament championships, SIUE men's soccer was voted the favorites to do it again. The Cougars received 14 of a possible 16 first-place votes and 98 total points in the preseason poll. The top six teams in league play advance to the OVC Championship tournament, with the first and second seeds receiving byes straight through to the semifinal round, and the tournament winner earns the league's automatic bid to the NCAA Tournament.

2025 OVC Men's Soccer Preseason Poll

- 1. SIUE (14 first-place votes) - 98 points
- 2. HCU (2) - 69
- 3. Lindenwood - 67
- 4. Liberty - 64
- 5. UIW - 55
- 6. Western Illinois - 39
- 7. Eastern Illinois - 38
- 8. Southern Indiana - 18

== Regular season ==
The regular season began on August 21, 2025 following three exhibition games.

The seven game non-conference schedule included three teams--- 21st ranked Denver, 18th ranked Saint Louis, and Kansas City who ended-the season ranked #21-- that were, like the Cougars, in last season's NCAA tournament. All three defeated SIUE, with Saint Louis regaining possession of the Bronze Boot.

Only Evan Howard, a transfer from Coastal Carolina, was able to help replacing the loss of last season's scoring, and the Cougars offense suffered. Only the defense kept the season from being a total disaster. Of the seven nonconfernce opponents, SIUE defeated only Air Force, who finished near the bottom of the NCAA's RPI ratings at number 206 of 213 teams.

After starting the OVC schedule with two loses, the Cougars put together a five game streak with three wins and two draws. However, they then lost two games before ending the season on a winning note.

The final regular season record was a disappointing 5-10-2 with an RPI rating of 167.

== Postseason ==
SIUE entered the 2025 Ohio Valley Men's Soccer Championship with its two leading scorers, Evan Howard (8 goals, 3 assists) and Carles Zomeno (2 & 2) out with injuries. Their quarterfinals match was versus Western Illinois, who had defeated the Cougars twice. Led by two grad students, captain defender Wes Gibson and midfielder Ethan Hackenberg, the team put on its best display of both offense and defence for the season. In a contest that could only be described as "chippy", there were thirtyone (31) fouls, with seven yellow cards issued, but Hackenberg scored his only two goals of the season, and SIUE prevailed 2-0.

The OVC Championship semifinal was fourth seeded SIUE versus top-seeded regular season champion Lindenwood on its home field. The Lions fairly well dominated the Cougars during the first half, getting off twelve shots (6 on goal) to the Cougars' four (0), and the home team scored twice. In the second half, with Carles Zomeno back on the field, the Cougars from the quarterfinals returned, monopolizing the offense and playing solid defense, outshooting the Lions 10 to three. However, the home squad packed in its defnse and refused to let the visitors score. The Cougars finished their season with a 6-11-2 record. Lindenwood, the regular season champion is 14-2-3 and will play in Saturday night's OVC Championship game. Through the season, the Cougars lost six games to five schools that made the NCAA Championship tournament.

== Honors ==
Two days ahead of the start of the 2025 OVC Championship in St. Charles, Missouri, SIUE's defender Wes Gibson, midfielder Carles Zomeno, and forward Evan Howard were named to the ALL-OVC First Team. Howard and goalkeeper Noah Scheidweiler were named to the OVC All-Newcomer Team.

Following Lindenwood's defeat of Houston Chriistian in the OVC Championship game, the OVC All-Tournament Team was announced. Cougar midfielders grad student Ethan Hackenberg and freshman Dan Murray were named to the eleven member squad.

== Roster ==
Source=

Buff background indicates returning players from 2024. Pink background indicates players "4redshirted" in 2024.

#	Name	Nationality	Height	Weight	Class	Hometown	High School	Academy/Club	Transfer from
Goalkeepers
1	Noah Scheidweiler	(Luxembourg)	6'2"	165	Freshman	Gasperich, Luxembourg City, Luxembourg		FC Swift Hesperange	
29	Ethan Kornas	(United States)	5'11"	150	Redshirt Juunior	Huntley, Illinois	Huntley	Eclipse Select SC	
30	Patrick O'Day	(United States)	6'2"	180	RedshirtJunior	O'Fallon, Missouri	Liberty		Lewis and Clark
Defenders
3	Elliott Forestier	(Australia)	5'11"	175	Senior	Sydney, Australia	Sydney Secondary College	Sydney Olympic FC	Oklahoma Christian
4	Wesley Gibson*	(United States)	6'1"	180	Graduate Student	Morton, Illinois	Morton	Central Illinois United	
5	Archie McDonnell	(England)	6'4"	187	Redshirt Sophomore	Leeds, England	St Mary's Menston	UFCA and Horsforth St. Margaret's	
12	Enrique Ezquerro	(Spain)	6'1"	177	Senior	Pradejon, Spain	Valle del Cidacos	Pradejon	WVU Tech
13	Paulo Júnior Sousa Rodrigues	(Luxembourg)	6'	176	Freshman	Bertrange, Luxembourg		FC Rodange	
15	Bobby Pauly	(United States)	6'	165	Junior	St. Charles, Missouri	Orchard Farm	St. Louis Scott Gallagher	
16	Garrison Hill	(United States)	6'2"	175	Redshirt Sophomore	Kansas City, Missouri	The Pembroke Hill School	Sporting Blue Valley SC	
19	Colin Bastianoni	(United States)	6'	170	Redshirt Junior	Naperville, Illinois	Metea Valley	Eclipse SC	
20	Mathias Clausen	(Costa Rica)	5'11"	176	Freshman	San Jose, Costa Rica		Futbol Consultants Desamparados	
25	Anton Mosley	(United States)	6'1"	180	Redshirt Freshman	Shiloh, Illinois	Belleville-East	St. Louis Scott Gallagher	
26	Seth Comer	(United States)	5'11"	165	Freshman	Cedar Rapids, Iowa	Linn-Mar High School	VSA Rush	
28	Murray Peart	(Australia)	6"	167	Freshman	Eleebana, New South Wales, Australia		Newcastle Jets	
Midfielders
2	Tyler Sargent	(United States)	5'10"	145	Redshirt Freshman	Oakville, Missouri	Whitfield School	St. Louis City	
6	Carles Zomeno	(Spain)	6'	160	Senior	Valencia, Spain			Salt Lake CC
8	Ethan Hackenberg	(United States)	5'9"	160	Graduate Student	Pittsburgh, Pennsylvania	United School of Sports	Swiss 1.Liga Group 3	Virginia Tech
14	Zach Renz	(United States)	5'10"	165	Redshirt Junior	Wentzville, Missouri	Timberland	St. Louis Scott Gallagher Elite	
18	Ben Perkins	(United States)	6'2"	165	Redshirt Freshman	Affton, Missouri	St. John Vianney	St. Louis Scott Gallagher	
22	Jake Karolczak	(United States)	5'10"	175	Redshirt Senior	St. Charles, Missouri	St. Dominic		
23	Daniel Murray	(England)	5'10"	160	Freshman	Croydon, London, England		Portsmouth Football Club	
24	Karson Gibbs	(United States)	5'10"	160	Senior	St. Charles, Missouri	Fort Zumwalt South	St. Louis City 2	St. Louis
Forwards
7	Ron Arie	(Israel)	6'	170	Sophomore	Zikhron Ya'akov, Israel			FIU
9	Evan Howard	(England)	6'5"	185	Senior	Newcastle, England			Coastal Carolina
10	Hugo Cornish	(Australia)	6'1"	170	Junior	Sydney, Australia			William Penn
21	Ryley Gibbs	(United States)	6'	170	Sophomore	O'Fallon, Missouri	Fort Zumwalt South	St. Louis City 2	
27	Dominic Bartoni	(United States)	6'2"	188	Redshirt Freshman	St. Louis, Missouri	CBC		SMU

- (redshirt) = Players "redshirted' for the 2025 season.
- * = Captain

== Schedule and results ==
Source=

=== Exhibitions ===
August 6, 2025	Lewis and Clark	v	SIUE	Edwardsville, Illinois
7:00 PM		[ ]		Stadium: Ralph Korte Stadium

August 9, 2025	SIUE	v	Illinois College	Edwardsville, Illinois
6:00 PM		[ ]		Stadium: Ralph Korte Stadium

August 16, 2025 Cougar Kickoff	Evansville	v	SIUE	Edwardsville, Illinois
7:00 PM		[ ]		Stadium: Ralph Korte Stadium

=== Regular season ===
August 21, 2025	Florida Gulf Coast	2-1	SIUE	Edwardsville, Illinois
7:30 PM	Oliveira 18' ( Martinez); Oliveira 61' (Murguia)		Zomeno 76' (McDonnell)	Stadium: Ralph Korte Stadium; Attendance: 432; Referee: Matthew Rodman

August 28, 2025	SIUE	2-1	Air Force	Air Force Academy, Colorado
8:00 PM	Howard 27' (unassisted); Bastianoni 42' (Gibson)		Toth 52' (unassisted} )	Stadium: Cadet Soccer Stadium; Attendance: 105; Referee: Jeff Arthurholtz

August 31, 2025	SIUE	1-2	#21 Denver	Denver, Colorado
4:00 PM	Howard 33' (pen.)		Holger 11' (pen.); Wright 42' (Holger)	Stadium: Denver Soccer Stadium; Attendance: 678; Referee: Younes Marrakchi

September 7, 2025 Bronze Boot Game	SIUE	1-2	#16 St. Louis	Saint Louis, Missouri
6:00 PM	Howard 87' (Cornish)		O'Neil 58' (Heckenlaible); Franca 66' (Unassisted)	Stadium: Hermann Stadium; Attendance: 2245; Referee: Matthew Stein

September 11, 2025	Loyola Chicago	2-1	SIUE	Edwardsville, Illinois
7:00 PM	Ivancic 76' (Janjic); Bischof 78' (Chavarria)		Howard 45' (McDonnell); McDonnell (red card) 76'	Stadium: Ralph Korte Stadium; Attendance: 269; Referee: Adam Herges

September 17, 2025	Kansas City	2-0	SIUE	Edwardsville, Illinois
7:00 PM	Outman; Francou 30' (Betina)			Stadium: Ralph Korte Stadium; Attendance: 212; Referee: Velimir Milovic

September 21, 2025	SIUE	1-2	Omaha	Omaha, Nebraska
1:00 PM	Howard 52' (Forestier)		M.Perkins 30' (Igarashi); Klien	Stadium: Al F. Caniglia Field; Attendance: 144

September 27, 2025 Homecoming	Lindenwood	2-0	SIUE	Edwardsville, Illinois
	Soares 77' (Chandler); Csiszar 89' (Csiszar)		McDonnell (red card) 56'	Stadium: Ralph Korte Stadium; Attendance: 2372; Referee: George Major

October 2, 2025	SIUE	0-1	Western Illinois	Macomb, Illinois
3:30 PM			Graham 80' (unassisted)	Stadium: MacKenzie Alumni Field; Attendance: 50; Referee: Art Arustamyan

October 5 2025	Eastern Illinois	0-1	SIUE	Edwardsville, Illinois
1:00 PM			Howard 9' (pen.)	Stadium: Ralph Korte Stadium; Attendance: 397; Referee: Josh Few

October 9, 2025	SIUE	0-0	Lindenwood	St. Charles, Missouri
7:00 PM				Stadium: Hunter Stadium; Attendance: 207; Referee: Heber Estrada

October 21 2025	SIUE	2-2	Southern Indiana	Evansville, Indiana
5:00 PM	Bartoni 23' (Howard); Perkins 31' (Sousa- Rodrigues & Cornish)	[ ]	Bello 37' (Smith); Davila 74' (unassisted)	Stadium: Strassweg Field; Attendance: 225; Referee: Aaron Rawlins

October 16, 2025 Alumni Day	Houston Christian	0-1	SIUE	Edwardsville, Illinois
5:00 PM		[ ]	Renz	Stadium: Ralph Korte Stadium; Attendance: 187; Referee: Christopher Koloffon

October 19, 2025 Senior Day	Incarnate Word	0-2	SIUE	Edwardsville, Illinois
12:00 PM		[ ]	Howard 40' (unassisted); Peart	Stadium: Ralph Korte Stadium; Attendance: 271; Referee: Youssef Elmessoussi

October 25 2025	SIUE	1-2	Liberty	Lynchburg, Virginia
1:00 PM	Conneh 19' (Blay); Carman 32' (McCarthy)	[ ]	Zomeno	Stadium: Osborne Stadium; Attendance: 340; Referee: Kevin Uitto

October 30, 2025	Western Illinois	2-1	SIUE	Edwardsville, Illinois
7:00 PM	Gagnon 59' (Porras); Porras 67' (Gainey)	[ ]	Howard 14' (Zomeno)	Stadium: Ralph Korte Stadium; Attendance: 115; Referee: John Kennedy

November 2, 2025	SIUE	2-1	Eastern Illinois	Charleston, Illinois
3:00 PM	Gibson {{}goal|39|unassisted}} R.Gibbs 64' (Gibson)	[ ]	Roberti 31' (TODA)	Stadium: Lakeside Field; Attendance: 171; Referee: Cesar Ibarra

=== Post-season ===
2025 Ohio Valley Conference men's soccer tournament

November 9, 2025 Quarterfinals	SIUE	2-0	Western Illinois	St. Charles, Missouri
12:00 Noon	Hackenberg 11' (Clausen); Hackenberg 57' (pen.)			Stadium: Hunter Stadium; Attendance: 127; Referee: Christopher Spasovici

November 12, 2025 Semifinals	Lindenwood	2-1	SIUE	St. Charles, Missouri
4:00 PM	blake 9' (Haesler); Bartoni 36' (Legai); Lasndais (red card) 87'		Karolczak (red card) 90'	Stadium: Hunter Stadium; Attendance: 789; Referee: Cesar Ibarra

== Scoring ==
Source=

- Through game of November 12

Player	Goals	Assists	Points
Evan Howard	8	3	19
Carles Zomeno	2	2	6
Ethan Hackenberg	2	0	4
Wesley Gibson	1	1	3
Zach Renz	1	1	3
Dominic Bartoni	1	1	3
Hugo Cornish	0	3	3
Ryley Gibbs	1	0	2
Murray Peart	1	0	2
Ben Perkins	1	0	2
Colin Bastianoni	1	0	2
Archie McDonnell	0	2	2
Mathias Clausen	0	1	1
Jake Karolczak	0	1	1
Paulo Júnior Sousa Rodrigues	0	1	1
Elliott Forestier	0	1	1

== Statistics ==
- Through game of November 12

Field Players
#	Name	Games	Starts	Minutes	Goals	Assists	Points	Shots	Shot %age	Shots On Goal	OG %age	Yellow/Red cards	Game Winners	Penalty Goals/Kicks
9	Evan Howard	16	16	1309	8	3	19	50	.160	24	.480	3-0	2	3-4
6	Carles Zomeno	18	17	1489	2	2	6	28	.071	13	.464	3-0	0	0-0
4	Wesley Gibson	19	18	1658	1	2	4	7	0.173	4	0.571	5-0	0	0-1
8	Ethan Hackenberg	16	11	857	2	0	4	22	0.091	7	.318	5-0	1	1-1
10	Hugo Cornish	19	12	988	0	3	3	25	0.000	11	.440	3-0	0	0-0
14	Zach Renz	18	10	869	1	1	3	9	0.111	5	0.556	0-0	1	0-0
27	Dominic Bartoni	12	5	416	1	0	2	11	0.091	3	0.273	4-0	0	0-0
19	Colin Bastianoni	16	9	791	1	0	2	8	.125	3	.375	3-0	1	0-0
21	Ryley Gibbs	13	3	393	1	0	2	8	0.125	3	0.375	1-0	1	0-0
5	Archie McDonnell	16	16	1392	0	2	2	1	0.000	0	0.000	3-2	0	0-0
28	Murray Peart	10	2	318	1	0	2	3	0.333	2	0.667	0-0	0	0-0
18	Ben Perkins	19	11	931	1	0	2	17	0.059	4	.235	0-0	0	0-0
20	Mathias Clausen	13	9	738	0	1	1	7	0.000	2	0.286	1-0	0	0-0
3	Elliott Forestier	16	10	877	0	1	1	4	0.000	1	0.250	1-0	0	0-0
22	Jake Karolczak	17	7	677	0	1	1	8	0.00	3	0.375	1-1	0	0-0
13	Paulo Júnior Sousa Rodrigues	9	2	272	0	1	1	0	0.000	0	0.000	2-0	0	0-0
1	Noah Scheidweiler	19	19	1633	0	0	0	0	0.000	0	0.000	0-0	0	0-0
2	Tyler Sargent	2	0	22	0	0	0	0	0.000	0	0.000	0-0	0	0-0
7	Ron Arie	6	0	98	0	0	0	2	0.000	1	0.500	1-0	0	0-0
12	Enrique Ezquerro	1	0	19	0	0	0	0	0.000	0	0.000	0-0	0	0-0
15	Bobby Pauly	19	19	1690	0	0	0	2	0.000	0	0.000	1-0	0	0-0
23	Daniel Murray	15	121	930	0	0	0	2	0.000	1	0.500	4-0	0	0-0
24	Karson Gibbs	6	1	193	0	0	0	1	0.000	0	0.000	0-0	0	0-0
25	Anton Mosley	3	0	17	0	0	0	0	0.000	0	0.000	0-0	0	0-0
29	Ethan Kornas	1	0	77	0	0	0	0	0.000	0	0.000	0-0	0	0-0
16	Garrison Hill	0	0	0	0	0	0	0	0.000	0	0.000	0-0	0	0-0
26	Seth Comer	0	0	0	0	0	0	0	0.000	0	0.000	0-0	0	0-0
30	Patrick O'Day	0	0	0	0	0	0	0	0.000	0	0.000	0-0	0	0-0
	Totals	19	19	18,762	19	17	55	218	0.087	87	.399	44-3	6	4-6
	Opponents	19	19	18,790	25	22	72	215	.116	95	.442	40-2	11	1-1

Goalkeepers
#	Name	Games	Starts	Minutes	Goals allowed	GA Ave.	Saves	Save %	Wins	Loses	Ties	Shutouts	Shots Faced
29	Ethan Kornas	1	0	77:03	1	1.17	3	.750	0	1	0	0	19
1	Noah Scheidweiler	19	19	1632:57	24	1.32	66	.733	6	10	2	5	196
30	Patrick O'Day	0	0	0:00	0	0.000	0	0.000	0	0	0	0	0
	Totals	19	19	1720:00	25	1.32	69	.734	6	11	2	5	218
	Opponents	18	18	1620:00	19	1.06	67	.779	10	6	2	4	205

Additional stats	Corner kicks	Offsides	Fouls	Goals/game
SIUE	88	33	212	1.00
Opponents	77	34	218	1.22
