= Scott Donnelly (soccer coach) =

American soccer player, coach and scout

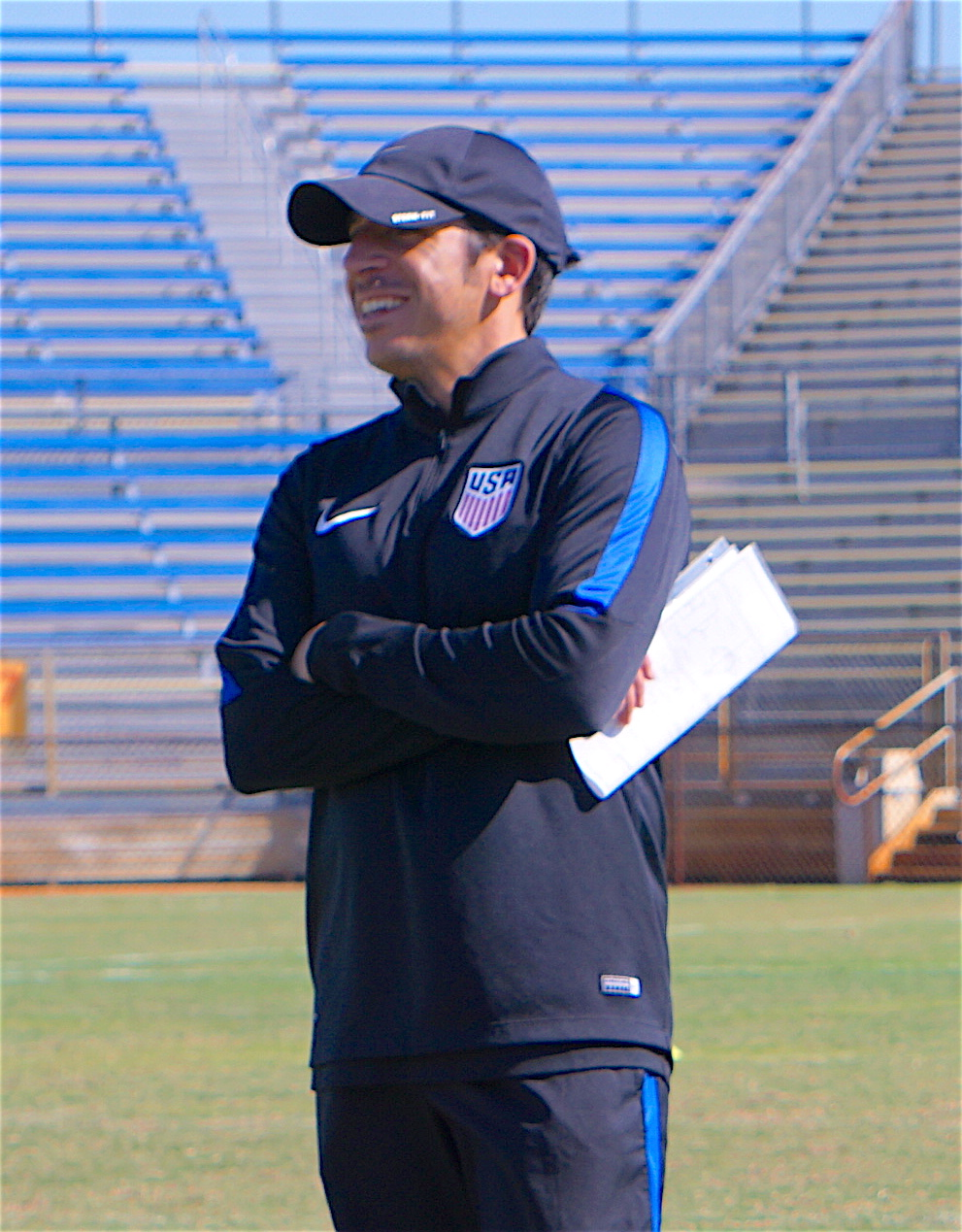

Personal information
- Date of birth: c. 1980 (age 45–46)
- Place of birth: New York, New York, U.S.

College career
Years	Team	Apps	(Gls)
1998	Binghamton Bearcats		
2000–2002	Geneseo Knights		

Managerial career
- 2003–2005: Washington College (assistant)
- 2005–2006: Sewanee (assistant)
- 2007–2008: Mars Hill
- 2009–2011: Northern Illinois (associate)
- 2012–2013: SIU Edwardsville Cougars (associate)
- 2013–2014: SIU Edwardsville Cougars
- 2014–2017: United States U18 (assistant)
- 2018–2019: Atlanta United 2
- 2019–: Manchester United (scout)

Scott Donnelly (born c. 1980) is an American soccer player, coach, scout and football executive.

== Youth & education ==
Donnelly attended Binghamton University for his freshman year, then transferred to the State University of New York at Geneseo, where he played for three years. He graduated from SUNY Geneseo in 2002 with dual bachelor's degrees in English Literature and Spanish Language. He earned a master's degree in European History from Washington College in 2005.

== Coaching ==
Donnelly began his coaching as an assistant for three seasons at Division III Washington College in Chestertown, Maryland. That was followed by two seasons as an assistant (and interim head coach) at Sewanee: The University of the South in Sewanee, Tennessee, another Division III school.

In 2007, Donnelly moved up to Division II when he was named head coach at Mars Hill College (now University) of Mars Hill, North Carolina. His two seasons at Mars Hill turned the program from a perennial loser into a winner, prompting his early hiring away from that job.

In 2009, Donnelly was hired as an assistant at Division I Northern Illinois University, and in 2010, he was promoted to the position of Associate Head Coach. After three years at NIU, he was lured away to the higher profile program at Southern Illinois University Edwardsville, where he was hired as Associate Head Coach in 2012. When, at the conclusion of the 2013 season, Kevin Kalish resigned for a job that would allow him more time with his family, Donnelly was named as his successor, becoming only the fourth head coach in the program's distinguished history. In 2014, Donnelly accepted a position with the USSF as a coach and scout with the youth national teams, working with the U15 – U20 national teams at various points. Donnelly worked primarily with the U-18 men's national team, alongside Omid Namazi and took part in the 2017 FIFA U-17 World Cup in India as part of the USA staff.

In 2018, Donnelly was hired by Atlanta United to coach Atlanta United 2 in the team's inaugural USL season. Following the season, Donnelly accepted a role as a first team scout for Manchester United.

Donnelly's credentials include a USSF "A" License, the NSCAA Premier Diploma and the USSF "Academy Director" License. <>

Record table
Season	Team	Overall	Conference	Standing	Postseason
Mars Hill College (South Atlantic Conference) (2007–2008)
2007	Mars Hill	8–9–3	1–5–1	7th	SAC 1st round
2008	Mars Hill	10–9–0	4–4–0	5th	SAC 1st round
Mars Hill:		18–18–3	5–9–1		
SIU Edwardsville (Missouri Valley Conference) (2014–present)
2014	SIUE	0–0–0	0–0–0	0–0–0	0–0–0
SIUE:		0–0–0	0–0–0		
Total:		18–18–3			
National champion Postseason invitational champion Conference regular season champion Conference regular season and conference tournament champion Division regular season champion Division regular season and conference tournament champion Conference tournament champion
