= SIU Edwardsville Cougars men's soccer =

American college soccer team

- 2025 SIU Edwardsville Cougars men's soccer team
- Founded: 1967; 59 years ago
- University: Southern Illinois University Edwardsville
- Head coach: Cale Wassermann (7th season)
- Conference: OVC
- Location: Edwardsville, Illinois
- Stadium: Ralph Korte Stadium (capacity: 4,000)
- Nickname: Cougars
- Colors: Red and white
Home	Away

NCAA tournament championships
- 1972*, 1979

NCAA tournament runner-up
- 1975, 2004*

NCAA tournament College Cup
- 1972*, 1975, 1977, 1979, 1982, 2001*, 2004*, 2005*

NCAA tournament Quarterfinals
- 1970, 1971, 1972*, 1973, 1974, 1975, 1977, 1978, 1979, 1982, 2001*, 2004*, 2005*

NCAA tournament Round of 16
- 1969, 1970, 1971, 1972*, 1973, 1974, 1975, 1977, 1978, 1979, 1982, 2001*, 2003*, 2004*, 2005*, 2006*, 2007*, 2016

NCAA tournament appearances
- 1969, 1970, 1971, 1972*, 1973, 1974, 1975, 1976, 1977, 1978, 1979, 1980, 1981, 1982, 1997*, 2001*, 2003*, 2004*, 2005*, 2006*, 2007*, 2014, 2016, 2023, 2024

Conference tournament championships
- 1997*, 2002*, 2004*, 2006, 2014, 2016, 2023, 2024

Conference Regular Season championships
- 1987, 1997*, 2001*, 2003*, 2004*, 2005*, 2006*, 2015, 2023, 2024 * - at Division II level

The SIU Edwardsville Cougars men's soccer team represents Southern Illinois University Edwardsville (SIUE) in the Ohio Valley Conference (OVC) of NCAA Division I soccer. The Cougars play their home matches on Bob Guelker Field at Ralph Korte Stadium located in the southwest corner of the SIUE campus in Edwardsville, Illinois.

It was announced on June 2, 2017, that the Cougars' men's soccer and wrestling teams would become affiliate members of the Mid-American Conference beginning in the 2018 season. Through the cooperative efforts of the MVC and the MAC, the Cougars soccer team made the move a year earlier than originally announced and played the 2017 season in the MAC.

On November 30, 2018, it was reported that Mario Sanchez had resigned to accept the position of director of youth development and community relations for Louisville City FC of the United Soccer League. The search for a permanent replacement began immediately. On January 18, Michigan State assistant coach Cale Wassermann was named as the Cougars' new head coach.

SIUE would return to MVC men's soccer in 2021. In March 2023, the Cougars' primary conference home of the OVC announced it would launch a men's soccer league in the 2023 fall season with SIUE as one of its eight members.

== History ==
=== Beginning: Bob Guelker era ===
The SIUE soccer program first entered competition in 1967 under the leadership of National Soccer Hall of Fame coach Bob Guelker. Guelker had been hired away from St. Louis University, where he had also started the program, winning five NCAA championships in eight seasons, including the first NCAA soccer title in 1959. The Cougars were invited to the NCAA tournament in Guelker's third year at the helm and reached the Elite 8 the next two seasons.

When the NCAA started a second division for soccer in 1972, SIUE moved into the new division, since its other athletic programs were also in Division II, and a number of other college soccer powers also made the move. That team went 11–0–3 for the season, winning the 1972 championship. (Of the 24 schools in that inaugural Division II tournament, SIUE and 7 others currently play in Division I (3 others moved into Division I in 1973 but have since moved down), 5 others would later win Division II championships, and Akron, Hartwick, and SIUE would later win Division I crowns.)

After winning the Division II title, SIUE took advantage of the NCAA rule then in effect that allowed Division II schools to play one sport in Division I and one sport in Division III, and moved to Division I. In the next ten seasons, Guelker's Cougars were invited to the Division I tournament every year, advancing to four College Cup semifinals appearances and winning the Division I title in 1979.

Toward the end of Guelker's tenure, scandal in some of the university's other sports programs brought about a major reduction of funding for all sports, and the program went into a period of decline.

Guelker headed the program until his death in February 1986. In his nineteen seasons, only the first (3–3–0) was a non-winning one, and he compiled a record of 216–67–21, with fourteen appearances in the NCAA tournament (thirteen in Division I).

=== The Ed Huneke era ===
Coach Guelker was succeeded by former Cougar player Ed Huneke. During Huneke's years, the program moved from a Division I independent to membership in the short-lived Big Central Soccer Conference, back to being an independent, a short associate membership in the Mid-Continent Conference, and then reluctantly stepped down to join the Division II Great Lakes Valley Conference (GLVC) in 1996.

During the university's twelve years in the GLVC, Huneke's Cougars won six regular season titles, four conference tournaments, and received seven invitations to the NCAA Division II tournament, where they reached the Division II College Cup semifinals three times and were national runner-up in 2004.

Huneke coached the Cougars for twenty-two seasons, building a record of 251–155–34.

=== The Kevin Kalish era ===
From Huneke's retirement in 2008 through the 2013 season, the program was led by Kevin Kalish, who took it both back into Division I and into competition in the Missouri Valley Conference (MVC). During the Cougars' first season (2010) in the MVC, they finished second in both the conference regular season (to Creighton) and the conference tournament (to Bradley).

In 2012, the Cougars were ranked during the season for the first time since the 1980s, finished second in the MVC in both the regular season and the conference tournament (both to NCAA semifinalist Creighton), and narrowly missed returning to the Division I tournament for the first time since 1982. For the season, Kalish was named the National Soccer Coaches Association of America (NSCAA) Midwest Region Coach of the Year, and his staff was named the Missouri Valley Conference Coaching Staff of the year.

Kalish compiled a 49–46–14 record in his six seasons.

On December 6, 2012, it was announced that Kevin Kalish was leaving for a job that would allow him to spend more time with his family.

=== The Interim ===
On December 6, 2013, Associate Head Coach Scott Donnelly was named to succeed Kevin Kalish and become SIUE's fourth head coach. For the second year in a row, Donnelly's incoming players were rated one of the top recruiting classes in the country.

On August 10, 2014, it was announced that Donnelly had suddenly and unexpectedly resigned after being recruited to be the new Technical Advisor for the Northeast region of the United States Soccer Federation (U.S. Soccer). Seventh year goalkeepers coach Brian Jones and first year assistant coach David Korn were named co-head coaches.

The Cougars started the 2014 season in frustrating fashion, with five overtime games in the first six and a record of 0–6–2 after eight games. Then they entered Missouri Valley Conference play and ran off four straight victories. An embarrassing loss at NIU was followed by a tie at nationally ranked Louisville and another tie at home to eventual MVC champion Missouri State. Completing the regular season at 5–8–2, the Cougars entered the MVC Tournament as the #2 seed and an opening round bye at Bradley. The Cougars rallied from trailing early to defeat Bradley 2–1 in the semifinals. Then, in their school record ninth overtime game of the season, the Cougars downed Missouri State 1–0 to win SIUE's first MVC Tournament Championship and earn a spot in the NCAA Division I Men's Soccer Championship for the first time since 1982 and then advanced to the second round.

Athletic Director Dr. Brad Hewitt announced on December 5 that SIUE would conduct a nationwide search for a new head coach stating, "We will secure the best possible leadership to maintain and enhance the strong academic, athletic and community engagement standards that define SIUE Soccer and SIUE Athletics.". David Korn remained as associate head coach and Scott Gyllenberg was retained as assistant coach. Brian Jones, however, departed to become the goalkeepers coach of the professional Saint Louis Football Club of the United Soccer Leagues.

=== The Mario Sanchez era ===
On January 27, 2015, Mario Sanchez, the associate head coach of the Louisville Cardinals was introduced as the new Cougars head coach.

In Sanchez' first season, the Cougars went 12–4–1 overall and 5–1–0 in the MVC, earning the first conference title since joining the league in 2010. With a Rating Percentage Index (RPI) of 39 (out of 206 teams), the Cougars were 28th of the teams that did not receive an automatic bid to the 2015 NCAA Division I Men's Soccer Championship; since there were only 24 at-large berths available, SIUE was passed over.

In Sanchez' second season, the Cougars won the 2016 Missouri Valley Conference Men's Soccer Tournament, the team's second title in three years, and earned the MVC's automatic bid to the 2016 NCAA Division I Men's Soccer Championship. The Cougars tied #13 Michigan State 1–1 and advanced to the second round on penalty kicks 9–8. They tied #11 Butler 0–0 and advanced to the third round on penalty kicks 5–4. They finally lost at #2 Wake Forest 2–1 in the program's first Division I Sweet 16 game since 1982.

On May 9, 2017, SIUE and Saint Louis U. (SLU) verbally agreed to resume their soccer rivalry in the 2018 and 2019 seasons. The annual Bronze Boot game was once the premier rivalry game in U.S. college soccer. The 1972, 1973, and 1980 games rank as the 14th, 7th, and 1st largest crowds in NCAA soccer history. “I remember hearing about the Bronze Boot;” declared SIUE coach Mario Sanchez. “It was one of college soccer’s biggest games every year. I’m ready for it to happen again." While the annual match was once played at Busch Memorial Stadium, the 2018 game will be at SLU's Hermann Stadium, with the 2019 meeting moving to SIUE's Ralph Korte Stadium. SLU leads the series 9–26–1.

The news was released on November 30, 2018, that Mario Sanchez resigned to join the Louisville City FC as director of youth development and community relations for the United Soccer League team.

=== The Cale Wassermann era ===
On January 18, 2019, following a national search, Michigan State assistant coach Cale Wassermann was named as the Cougars' new head coach.

On June 12, 2020, a month after the MAC announced the cancellation of its men's soccer tournament, MVC Commissioner Doug Elgin and SIUE Director of Athletics Tim Hall announced that SIUE men's soccer would return to the Missouri Valley Conference beginning with the 2021 season.

After SIUE had played two seasons in the MVC, the OVC announced on March 28, 2023 that it would add men's soccer for the 2023 season and beyond. The new league includes SIUE, three other full OVC members, and four single-sport affiliates.

On October 22, 2023, the Cougars clinched the regular season championship of the OVC. It was SIUE's first regular season soccer title since 2015 and the first OVC regular season title in any men's sport. On November 11, the Cougars added the Inaugural OVC Men's Soccer Tournament title. In defeating Incarnate Word 1-0, they earned the OVC's Automatic qualifier to the NCAA Tournament, the program's first bid in seven years. They lost a hard-fought match at Memphis 2-1 to finish the season 16-1-3.

On Halloween, October 31, 2024, the Cougars clinched their second regular season OVC championship. On November 16, the Cougars added their second OVC Men's Soccer Tournament title. In defeating Houston Christian 3-2 on a second overtime golden goal, they earned the OVC's Automatic qualifier to the NCAA Tournament. After losing OVC Goalkeeper of the Year Rob Gjelaj to a leg injury during pre-game warmups, the Cougars lost on a snowy afternoon at 23rd ranked Western Michigan 5-1 to finish the season 12-5-3.

== Players ==
=== Current roster ===
As of Nov 2025

Note: Flags indicate national team as defined under FIFA eligibility rules; some limited exceptions apply. Players may hold more than one non-FIFA nationality.

No.	Pos.	Nation	Player
1	GK	LUX	Noah Scheidweiler
2	MF	USA	Tyler Sargent
3	DF	AUS	Elliott Forestier
4	DF	USA	Wes Gibson
5	DF	ENG	Archie McDonnell
6	MF	ESP	Carles Zomeño
7	FW	ISR	Ron Arie
8	MF	USA	Ethan Hackenberg
9	FW	ENG	Evan Howard
10	FW	AUS	Hugo Cornish
12	DF	ESP	Enrique Ezquerro
13	DF	LUX	Paulo Júnior
14	MF	USA	Zach Renz

No.	Pos.	Nation	Player
15	DF	USA	Bobby Pauly
16	DF	USA	Garrison Hill
18	MF	USA	Ben Perkins
19	DF	USA	Colin Bastianoni
20	DF	CRC	Mathias Clausen
21	FW	USA	Ryley Gibbs
22	MF	USA	Jake Karolczak
23	MF	ENG	Daniel Murray
24	MF	USA	Karson Gibbs
25	DF	USA	Anton Mosley
29	GK	USA	Ethan Kornas
30	GK	USA	Patrick O'Day

=== All Americans ===
Through the years, more than 70 Cougars have gone on to play professionally, and 28 have been named All-Americans for their play at SIUE.

- (United States) Jack Blake 1970
- (United States) John Carenza 1970–71
- (United States) Vince Fassi 1972
- (United States) Tom Galati 1973
- (United States) John Stremlau 1973 & 1975
- (United States) Chris Carenza 1974
- (United States) Bob Kessen 1974
- (United States) Greg Makowski 1975–77
- (United States) Mike Kelley 1978
- (United States) Tom Groark 1981 First Team
- (United States) Ed Gettemeier 1982 Third Team
- (United States) Chris Hundelt 1983 Third Team
- (United States) Bill Stallings 1984 Third Team
- (United States) Steve Trittschuh 1985 Third Team &1986 First Team
- (United States) Matt Little 1997 First Team
- (United States) Justin McMillian 2001 First Team
- (United States) Chris Camacho 2002 Third Team
- (Trinidad and Tobago) Addae Rique 2003 First Team
- (United States) Cal Thomas 2003 First Team
- (United States) Tim Velten 2003 Third Team
- (United States) Michael Burgund 2004 Second Team
- (United States) Mike Banner 2005 First Team
- (United States) Kevin Thibodeau 2005 Second Team
- (United States) John Matthews 2006 Third Team
- (United States) Greg Crook 2007 Second Team
- (United States) Zach Bauer 2007 Third Team
- (United States) Randy Roy 2007 Second Team
- (United States) Dustin Attarian 2007 Second Team

Three Cougars have been named to the NSCAA Men's University Division Scholar All-America Teams.

- (United States) Ryan Bauer, 2012, Second Team
- (United States) Matt Polster. 2014. First Team
- (United States) Jacob Wieser. 2015. First Team

== Coaches ==
=== Current staff ===
As of 15 August 2025

Position	Staff
Head coach	Cale Wassermann
Assistant coach	Jordan Grant
Assistant coach	Drew Romig
Assistant coach	Alsadiq Hasan

=== Coaching history ===
#	Name	Tenure
1	Bob Guelker	1967–1985
2	Ed Huneke	1986–2007
3	Kevin Kalish	2008–2013
4	Brian Jones	2014
5	David Korn	2014
6	Mario Sanchez	2015–2018
7	Cale Wassermann	2019–present

== Statistics ==
=== Record by year ===
Season	Coach	Overall	Conference	Standing	Postseason
SIU Edwardsville (Single Division Independent) (1967–1971)
1967	Bob Guelker	3-3-0			
1968	Bob Guelker	10-0-0			
1969	Bob Guelker	10-1-1			NCAA Round of 16
1970	Bob Guelker	9-3-0			NCAA Elite 8
1971	Bob Guelker	10-2-1			NCAA Elite 8
SIU Edwardsville (Division II Independent) (1972–Only)
1972	Bob Guelker	11-0-3			NCAA Div. II College Cup Champion
SIU Edwardsville (Division I Independent) (1973–1987)
1973	Bob Guelker	11-2-1			NCAA Elite 8
1974	Bob Guelker	12-3-0			NCAA Elite 8
1975	Bob Guelker	14-4-0			NCAA College Cup Runner-up
1976	Bob Guelker	12-4-0			NCAA Elite 8
1977	Bob Guelker	12-4-1			NCAA College Cup 3rd Place
1978	Bob Guelker	14-3-1			NCAA Elite 8
1979	Bob Guelker	19-2-3			NCAA College Cup Champion
1980	Bob Guelker	10-8-2			NCAA 1st round
1981	Bob Guelker	13-4-1			NCAA 1st round
1982	Bob Guelker	15-4-1			NCAA College Cup 3rd Place
1983	Bob Guelker	10-6-2			
1984	Bob Guelker	8-7-4			
1985	Bob Guelker	13-7-0			
Bob Guelker:		216-67-21 .745			
1986	Ed Huneke	11-5-2			
SIU Edwardsville (Big Central Soccer Conference) (1987–1990)
1987	Ed Huneke	9-8-3	2-0-2	t-1st of 5	
1988	Ed Huneke	10-9-2	4-2-0	2nd of 7	
1989	Ed Huneke	11–9–1	2–4–0	t-4th of 6	
1990	Ed Huneke	11–10–1	4–2-0	3rd of 7	
SIU Edwardsville (Division I Independent) (1991–1993)
1991	Ed Huneke	9-11-0			
1992	Ed Huneke	12–5-1			
1993	Ed Huneke	4-14-0			
SIU Edwardsville (Mid-Continent Conference) (1994–1995)
1994	Ed Huneke	6-12-0	3-5-0	4th of 5 West	
1995	Ed Huneke	3–13–1	2-5-1	5th of 5 West	
SIU Edwardsville (Great Lakes Valley Conference (Division II)) (1996–2007)
1996	Ed Huneke	11–7-1	6-4-1	6th of 12	
1997	Ed Huneke	18–2-1	2–4–1	1st of 12	NCAA Div. II 1st round
1998	Ed Huneke	7–11–1	5–6-0	7th of 12	
1999	Ed Huneke	11-7–1	8-2–1	3rd of 12	
2000	Ed Huneke	11-7–2	8-3–0	3rd of 12	
2001	Ed Huneke	17-3-3	9-0-1	1st (tie) of 11	NCAA Div. II College Cup 3rd Place
2002	Ed Huneke	13-4–2	7–2–1	2nd (tie) of 11	
2003	Ed Huneke	16–4-1	10-0-0	1st of 11	NCAA Div. II Round of 16
2004	Ed Huneke	19-3-2	8-0-2	1st of 11	NCAA Div. II College Cup Runner-up
2005	Ed Huneke	16-3-3	11–0–1	1st of 14	NCAA Div. II College Cup 3rd Place
2006	Ed Huneke	15-4-3	10-2–1	1st of 14	NCAA Div. II Round of 16
2007	Ed Huneke	11–4-3	9–2–2	2nd of 14	NCAA Div. II Round of 16
Ed Huneke:		251-155-34 .609			
SIU Edwardsville (Division I Independent) (2008–2009)
2008	Kevin Kalish	5–8-1			
2009	Kevin Kalish	5-9-3			
SIU Edwardsville (Missouri Valley Conference) (2010–2016)
2010	Kevin Kalish	10-5-4	4–1–2	2nd of 8	
2011	Kevin Kalish	8–8–4	1-4-1	6th of 7	
2012	Kevin Kalish	13-7-0	4–2–0	2nd of 7	
2013	Kevin Kalish	8-9-2	3-3-0	4th of 7	
Kevin Kalish:		49-46-14 .514			
2014	Brian Jones & David Korn	8-9-4	4-1-1	2nd of 7	NCAA 2nd round
Jones & Korn:		8-9-4 .476	4-1-1		
2015	Mario Sanchez	12–4–2	5–1–0	1st of 7	
2016	Mario Sanchez	10–5–7	4–1–3	2nd of 7	NCAA Round of 16
SIU Edwardsville (Mid-American Conference) (2017–2020)
2017	Mario Sanchez	7–10–1	2–3–0	3rd of 6	
2018	Mario Sanchez	9–5–4	1–3–1	5th of 6	
Mario Sanchez:		38–24–14 .592	12–8–4		
2019	Cale Wassermann	8–5–4	2–1–2	t-2nd of 6	
2020	Cale Wassermann	5–5–0	2–5–0	6th of 6	
SIU Edwardsville (Missouri Valley Conference) (2021–2022)
2021	Cale Wassermann	6–10–2	4–6–0	3rd of 6	
2022	Cale Wassermann	5–9–2	2–6–0	6th of 7	
SIU Edwardsville (Ohio Valley Conference) (2023–present)
2023	Cale Wassermann	16–1–3	9–0–1	1st of 8	NCAA 1st Round
2024	Cale Wassermann	12–5–3	8–1–1	1st of 8	NCAA 1st Round
Cale Wassermann:		52–35–14 .584	27–19–4		
Total:		614–333–102	158–71–25		
National champion Postseason invitational champion Conference regular season champion Conference regular season and conference tournament champion Division regular season champion Division regular season and conference tournament champion Conference tournament champion

=== Conference standings ===
Program inaugurated, 1966–67
Independent 1967–71 (Single NCAA Division)
Division II Independent 1972
Division I Independent 1973–86

1987 Big Central Soccer Conference standings
	Conf.					Overall
Team	W		L		T	W		L		T
Quincy	2	–	0	–	2	13	–	4	–	2
SIU Edwardsville	2	–	0	–	2	9	–	8	–	3
Wisconsin–Milwaukee	1	–	2	–	1	11	–	8	–	2
Marquette	1	–	2	–	1	9	–	11	–	1
Northern Illinois	1	–	3	–	0	6	–	10	–	2
Cincinnati*	0	–	0	–	0	9	–	9	–	1
Rankings from NSCAA *-Charter member did not compete

1988 Big Central Soccer Conference standings
	Conf.					Overall
Team	W		L		T	W		L		T
Quincy $	5	–	1	–	0	12	–	6	–	2
SIU Edwardsville	4	–	2	–	0	10	–	9	–	2
Cincinnati	3	–	2	–	1	12	–	7	–	2
Wisconsin–Milwaukee	3	–	3	–	0	9	–	12	–	0
Drake	2	–	2	–	2	10	–	7	–	4
Marquette	2	–	3	–	1	12	–	7	–	2
Northern Illinois	0	–	6	–	0	7	–	10	–	1
$ – Conference champion; Rankings from NSCAA

1989 Big Central Soccer Conference standings
	Conf.					Overall
Team	W		L		T	W		L		T
Cincinnati	5	–	1	–	0	14	–	4	–	1
Wisconsin–Milwaukee	5	–	1	–	0	12	–	5	–	3
Northern Illinois $	4	–	2	–	0	14	–	4	–	2
Quincy	3	–	3	–	0	12	–	8	–	1
SIU Edwardsville	2	–	4	–	0	11	–	9	–	1
Drake	1	–	5	–	0	9	–	10	–	0
Louisville	1	–	5	–	0	8	–	11	–	2
$ – Conference champion; Rankings from NSCAA

1990 Big Central Soccer Conference standings
	Conf.					Overall
Team	W		L		T	W		L		T
No. 20 Wisconsin–Milwaukee $	4	–	1	–	0	16	–	4	–	2
SIU Edwardsville	4	–	2	–	0	11	–	10	–	1
Drake	4	–	2	–	0	10	–	8	–	4
Wright State	3	–	1	–	0	12	–	6	–	2
Cincinnati	3	–	3	–	0	9	–	10	–	2
Quincy	1	–	4	–	0	7	–	11	–	0
Louisville	0	–	6	–	0	2	–	13	–	2
$ – Conference champion; Rankings from NSCAA

Division I Independent 1991–93

1994 Mid-Continent Conference men's soccer standings
	Conf.					Overall
Team	W		L		T	W		L		T
East
Buffalo	5	–	0	–	1	11	–	7	–	1
Central Connecticut †	3	–	2	–	1	15	–	6	–	2
Valparaiso	2	–	4	–	0	2	–	13	–	1
Northeastern Illinois	1	–	5	–	0	1	–	19	–	0
West
Eastern Illinois	6	–	1	–	1	12	–	3	–	1
Kansas City	5	–	3	–	0	10	–	10	–	0
Quincy	3	–	4	–	1	8	–	8	–	4
SIU Edwardsville	3	–	5	–	0	6	–	12	–	0
Western Illinois	2	–	6	–	0	4	–	15	–	0
† 1994 Mid-Con Tournament winner As of December 13, 1994; Rankings from NSCAA

1995 Mid-Continent Conference men's soccer standings
	Conf.					Overall
Team	W		L		T	W		L		T
East
Central Connecticut †	5	–	0	–	1	15	–	3	–	3
Buffalo	3	–	2	–	1	9	–	8	–	2
Valparaiso	3	–	3	–	0	5	–	12	–	1
Northeastern Illinois	0	–	6	–	0	3	–	14	–	1
West
Western Illinois	7	–	1	–	0	15	–	4	–	1
Kansas City	4	–	4	–	0	9	–	10	–	0
Quincy	3	–	4	–	1	5	–	9	–	1
Eastern Illinois	3	–	5	–	0	3	–	12	–	0
SIU Edwardsville	2	–	5	–	1	3	–	13	–	1
† 1995 Mid-Con Tournament winner As of December 12, 1994; Rankings from NSCAA

GLVC Standings 1996–2007 N/A
Division I Independent 2008–09

2010 Missouri Valley Conference men's soccer standings
	Conf.					Overall
Team	W		L		T	W		L		T
No. 14 Creighton	5	–	1	–	1	13	–	5	–	2
SIU Edwardsville	4	–	1	–	2	10	–	5	–	4
Missouri State	4	–	1	–	2	8	–	7	–	3
Drake	4	–	2	–	1	8	–	8	–	2
Bradley †	3	–	3	–	1	11	–	9	–	3
Evansville	3	–	4	–	0	7	–	10	–	1
Eastern Illinois	1	–	5	–	1	4	–	12	–	1
Central Arkansas	0	–	7	–	0	3	–	13	–	0
† 2010 MVC Tournament winner As of December 14, 2010; Rankings from NSCAA

2011 Missouri Valley Conference men's soccer standings
	Conf.					Overall
Team	W		L		T	W		L		T
Missouri State	5	–	1	–	0	9	–	8	–	2
No. 4 Creighton †	5	–	1	–	0	21	–	2	–	1
No. 25 Bradley	4	–	2	–	0	15	–	6	–	2
Drake	3	–	3	–	0	11	–	8	–	1
Central Arkansas	1	–	3	–	2	2	–	12	–	4
SIU Edwardsville	1	–	4	–	1	8	–	8	–	4
Evansville	0	–	5	–	1	5	–	11	–	1
As of December 13, 2011; Rankings from NSCAA

2012 Missouri Valley Conference men's soccer standings
	Conf.					Overall
Team	W		L		T	W		L		T
No. 4 Creighton†	5	–	0	–	1	16	–	4	–	2
SIU Edwardsville	4	–	2	–	0	13	–	7	–	0
Bradley	3	–	2	–	1	10	–	6	–	4
Evansville	3	–	2	–	1	9	–	8	–	1
Drake	2	–	2	–	2	6	–	11	–	4
Central Arkansas	1	–	4	–	1	8	–	9	–	1
Missouri State	0	–	6	–	0	5	–	8	–	4
As of December 11, 2012; Rankings from NSCAA

2013 Missouri Valley Conference men's soccer standings
	Conf.					Overall
Team	W		L		T	W		L		T
Missouri State	5	–	1	–	0	11	–	5	–	2
Drake	3	–	1	–	2	8	–	8	–	4
Bradley ‡	3	–	2	–	1	14	–	7	–	2
SIU Edwardsville	3	–	3	–	0	8	–	9	–	2
Loyola Chicago	2	–	3	–	1	6	–	11	–	2
Evansville	2	–	4	–	0	10	–	8	–	1
Central Arkansas	0	–	4	–	2	4	–	11	–	2
‡ - Tournament champion + - Invited to the NCAA Division I Men's Soccer Championship; Rankings from November 25, 2013 NSCAA

2014 Missouri Valley Conference men's soccer standings
	Conf.					Overall
Team	W		L		T	W		L		T
Missouri State	4	–	0	–	2	9	–	5	–	4
SIU Edwardsville ‡	4	–	1	–	1	8	–	9	–	4
Evansville	4	–	2	–	0	6	–	11	–	1
Drake	3	–	3	–	0	5	–	11	–	3
Loyola Chicago	2	–	2	–	2	8	–	6	–	5
Bradley	1	–	5	–	0	9	–	11	–	0
Central Arkansas	0	–	5	–	1	2	–	13	–	1
‡ - MVC Tournament champion + - Invited to the NCAA Division I Men's Soccer Championship; As of November 23, 2014; Rankings from NSCAA

2015 Missouri Valley Conference men's soccer standings
	Conf.					Overall
Team	W		L		T	W		L		T
SIUE	5	–	1	–	0	12	–	5	–	2
Bradley	4	–	1	–	1	7	–	10	–	1
Drake ‡	3	–	1	–	2	13	–	5	–	3
Missouri State	3	–	2	–	1	6	–	6	–	5
Loyola Chicago	2	–	2	–	2	10	–	4	–	5
Central Arkansas	1	–	5	–	0	2	–	15	–	1
Evansville	0	–	6	–	0	3	–	13	–	0
‡-MVC Tournament Champion +-Invited to the NCAA Division I Men's Soccer Championship; As of November 22, 2015; Rankings from NSCAA

2016 Missouri Valley Conference men's soccer standings
	Conf.					Overall
Team	W		L		T	W		L		T
No. 21 Loyola Chicago +	6	–	1	–	1	14	–	4	–	1
No. 22 SIUE ‡	4	–	1	–	3	10	–	5	–	7
Evansville	4	–	2	–	2	9	–	8	–	3
Central Arkansas	4	–	3	–	1	7	–	7	–	3
Missouri State	3	–	4	–	1	9	–	8	–	2
Drake	2	–	5	–	1	6	–	12	–	1
Bradley	0	–	7	–	1	2	–	15	–	3
‡-MVC Tournament Champion +-Invited to the NCAA Division I Men's Soccer Championship; As of 13 December 2016; Rankings from NSCAA

2017 Mid-American Conference men's soccer standings
	Conf.					Overall
Team	W		L		T	W		L		T
No. 9 Western Michigan +	5	–	0	–	0	17	–	4	–	1
No. 3 Akron ‡	4	–	1	–	0	18	–	4	–	2
SIU Edwardsville	2	–	3	–	0	7	–	10	–	1
West Virginia	1	–	2	–	2	9	–	6	–	4
Bowling Green	1	–	3	–	1	7	–	9	–	1
Northern Illinois	0	–	4	–	1	3	–	11	–	1
‡ – 2017 MAC Tournament champion + – Invited to the 2017 NCAA Division I Men's Soccer Championship; As of December 13, 2017; Rankings from United Soccer Coaches

2018 Mid-American Conference men's soccer standings
	Conf.					Overall
Team	W		L		T	W		L		T
No. 22 West Virginia +	5	–	0	–	0	14	–	7	–	0
Bowling Green	2	–	1	–	2	6	–	7	–	4
Western Michigan	1	–	1	–	2	11	–	6	–	3
No. 2 Akron ‡	1	–	2	–	1	15	–	7	–	2
SIU Edwardsville	1	–	3	–	1	9	–	5	–	4
Northern Illinois	1	–	4	–	0	8	–	9	–	1
‡ – 2018 MAC Tournament champion + – Invited to the 2018 NCAA Division I Men's Soccer Championship; As of December 11, 2018; Rankings from United Soccer Coaches

2019 Mid-American Conference men's soccer standings
	Conf.					Overall
Team	W		L		T	W		L		T
Akron	4	–	0	–	1	6	–	10	–	2
Western Michigan	2	–	1	–	2	11	–	6	–	2
SIUE	2	–	1	–	2	8	–	5	–	4
Northern Illinois	2	–	3	–	0	7	–	10	–	1
Bowling Green	2	–	3	–	0	13	–	7	–	1
West Virginia ‡	0	–	4	–	1	10	–	9	–	2
‡ – 2019 MAC Tournament champion + – Invited to the 2019 NCAA tournament; As of 25 November 2019; Rankings from United Soccer Coaches; Source: MAC

2020 Mid-American Conference men's soccer standings
	Conf.					Overall
Team	W		L		T	W		L		T
Bowling Green †	5	–	2	–	1	7	–	5	–	1
Western Michigan	5	–	3	–	1	7	–	3	–	1
West Virginia	4	–	3	–	1	6	–	3	–	1
Akron	3	–	4	–	1	4	–	4	–	2
Northern Illinois	4	–	6	–	0	5	–	8	–	1
SIU Edwardsville	2	–	5	–	0	5	–	5	–	0
† – Conference champion + – Also invited to the 2020 NCAA tournament; As of May 3, 2021; Rankings from United Soccer Coaches

2021 Missouri Valley Conference men's soccer standings
	Conf.					Overall
Team	W		L		T	W		L		T
No. 22 Missouri State ‡	10	–	0	–	0	17	–	2	–	0
Loyola Chicago	6	–	3	–	1	9	–	5	–	2
SIU Edwardsville	4	–	6	–	0	6	–	10	–	2
Evansville	3	–	6	–	1	4	–	14	–	2
Drake	3	–	7	–	0	6	–	9	–	0
Bradley	3	–	7	–	0	5	–	12	–	1
‡ – 2021 MVC Tournament champion + – At-large invitation to the 2021 NCAA tournament; As of December 14, 2021; Rankings from United Soccer Coaches; Source: MVC

2022 Missouri Valley Conference men's soccer standings
	Conf.					Overall
Team	W		L		T	W		L		T
Missouri State‡	6	–	0	–	2	12	–	2	–	4
Drake	5	–	2	–	1	7	–	4	–	4
Evansville	3	–	2	–	3	8	–	5	–	6
Belmont	2	–	2	–	4	7	–	4	–	7
UIC	3	–	4	–	1	5	–	9	–	2
SIU Edwardsville	2	–	6	–	0	5	–	9	–	2
Bradley	1	–	6	–	1	5	–	11	–	3
‡ – 2022 MVC Tournament champion + – At-large invitation to the 2022 NCAA tournament; As of December 13, 2022; Rankings from United Soccer Coaches; Source: MVC

2023 Ohio Valley Conference men's soccer standings
	Conf.					Overall
Team	W		L		T	W		L		T
SIU Edwardsville ‡	9	–	0	–	1	16	–	1	–	3
Incarnate Word	4	–	3	–	3	7	–	8	–	5
Liberty	4	–	4	–	2	9	–	6	–	3
Lindenwood ^{#}	3	–	3	–	4	7	–	7	–	6
Chicago State	3	–	4	–	3	5	–	10	–	4
Eastern Illinois	3	–	5	–	2	4	–	10	–	5
Houston Christian	2	–	4	–	4	4	–	8	–	6
Southern Indiana ^{#}	1	–	6	–	3	2	–	12	–	3
‡ – 2023 Ohio Valley tournament champion + – At-large invitation to the 2023 NCAA tournament ^{#} – Ineligible for NCAA tournament (In transition); As of December 12, 2023; Rankings from United Soccer Coaches; Source: OVC

2024 Ohio Valley Conference men's soccer standings
	Conf.					Overall
Team	W		L		T	W		L		T
SIU Edwardsville ‡	8	–	1	–	1	12	–	5	–	3
Lindenwood ^{#}	6	–	2	–	2	11	–	6	–	3
Houston Christian	5	–	2	–	3	8	–	7	–	5
Liberty	5	–	3	–	2	7	–	7	–	3
Incarnate Word	3	–	2	–	5	6	–	6	–	6
Western Illinois	3	–	7	–	0	8	–	11	–	1
Southern Indiana ^{#}	1	–	7	–	2	2	–	14	–	2
Eastern Illinois	1	–	8	–	1	2	–	12	–	2
‡ – 2024 Ohio Valley tournament champion + – At-large invitation to the 2024 NCAA tournament ^{#} – Ineligible for NCAA tournament (In transition); As of December 17, 2024; Rankings from United Soccer Coaches; Source: OVC

=== Attendance records ===
#	Date	Rival	Location	Game	Att.
1	October 30, 1980	St. Louis Billikens	Busch Memorial Stadium, St. Louis, MO	11h Annual Bronze Boot Game	22,512
7	November 8, 1973	St. Louis Billikens	Busch Memorial Stadium, St. Louis, MO	4th Annual Bronze Boot Game	20,112
10	December 4, 1977	Brown Bears (Note: Hartwick vs San Francisco also played in the same day.)	Edwards Stadium, Berkeley, CA	NCAA College Cup Semifinals	16,503
14	November 5, 1972	St. Louis Billikens	Busch Memorial Stadium, St. Louis, MO	3rd Annual Bronze Boot Game	≥15,000

== Titles ==
=== National ===
- NCAA D-I Championship (1): 1979
- NCAA D-II Championship (1): 1972

=== Conference ===
- Missouri Valley tournament (2): 2014, 2016
- Ohio Valley tournament (2): 2023, 2024
- Great Lakes Valley tournament (4): 1997, 2002, 2004, 2006
- Big Central regular season (1): 1987
- Great Lakes Valley regular season (6): 1997, 2001, 2003, 2004, 2005, 2006
- Missouri Valley regular season (1): 2015
- Ohio Valley regular season (1): 2023, 2024

== See also ==
- SIU Edwardsville Cougars women's soccer
- Saint Louis–SIU Edwardsville men's soccer rivalry
