= 1972 NCAA College Division soccer tournament =

1972 College Division College Cup

Tournament details
- Country: United States
- Teams: 24

Final positions
- Champions: SIU Edwardsville (1st title)
- Runners-up: Oneonta (1st title game)

Tournament statistics
- Matches played: 23
- Goals scored: 88 (3.83 per match)
- Top goal scorer: N/A

Awards
- Best player: John Stremlau (offense); Farrukh Quraishi (defense)

The 1972 NCAA Division II Men's Soccer Championship (then named the NCAA College Division Men's Soccer Championship) was the inaugural Division II men's college soccer tournament held by the National Collegiate Athletic Association. Since 1959, all schools had competed in a single division. The SIU Edwardsville Cougars won their first NCAA title in any sport by defeating the Oneonta Red Dragons in the championship game, 1–0. The final match was played on December 9, 1972, in Edwardsville, Illinois, at SIUE's Cougar Field, which also hosted the Division I College Cup in 1970 and 1975.

== Early rounds ==
First round
Bridgeport	1
New Haven	0
Springfield	2(2OT)
Hartford	1
Hartwick	2(2OT)
Brockport	1
Adelphi	0
Oneonta	6
East Stroudsburg State	2(2OT)
Montclair State	1
Muhlenberg	5
Philadelphia Textile	4
South Florida	1(OT)
Madison College	0
Baltimore	7
Loyola Maryland	1

Second round
Bridgeport	0
Springfield	1
Hartwick	0
Oneonta	3
Cal State Fullerton	6
San Francisco State	1
Chico State	3
Seattle Pacific	2
East Stroudsburg State	2(2OT)
Muhlenberg	1
South Florida	0
Baltimore	1
UMSL	2
Akron	6
Eastern Illinois	0
SIU Edwardsville	3

Quarterfinals
Springfield	1
Oneonta	2
Cal State Fullerton	0
Chico State	1
East Stroudsburg	0
Baltimore	3
Akron	2
SIU Edwardsville	3

Semifinals
Oneonta	6
Chico State	0
Baltimore	1
SIU Edwardsville	4

Championship
Oneonta	0
SIU Edwardsville	1

== Final ==
December 9, 1972

SIU Edwardsville	1–0	Oneonta
Chris Carenza 52' (Driscoll)	Report

Cougar Field, Edwardsville, Illinois
Attendance: 3,000 (est.)

== Division change ==
1972 was the only year that this tournament was known as the "College Division Men's Soccer Championship." In 1973, the NCAA renamed the University Division as Division I and the College Division as Division II.

Several of the teams in the new Division II that placed a high emphasis on their soccer programs, including both SIUE and Oneonta, moved to Division I after only one season, taking advantage of a then-current NCAA rule that allowed a Division II school to play one sport in Division I and a Division I school to play one sport in Division II. As a result, seven of the twenty-four teams in the 1972 College Division tournament were among the twenty-four teams in the 1973 Division I tournament.

NCAA Men's Soccer Teams that were in 1972 College Division Tournament & 1973 Division I Tournament
School	School's current name	Current Division
University of Bridgeport	Same	II
Hartwick College	Same	III
Madison College	James Madison University	I
Oneonta State University College of Education	State University of New York at Oneonta	III
Philadelphia College of Textiles & Science	Thomas Jefferson University	II
Southern Illinois University at Edwardsville	Southern Illinois University Edwardsville	I
University of South Florida	Same	I

Although four of the seven teams have since stepped down to a lower division, five other schools in the 1972 tournament have since moved up to Division I. These are: Akron, Cal State Fullerton, Eastern Illinois, Hartford, and Loyola Maryland.

== See also ==
- 1972 NCAA University Division soccer tournament
- 1972 NAIA Soccer Championship
