= Big Central Soccer Conference =

- Sport: Association football
- Founded: 1987
- Folded: 1991; 35 years ago
- Organizing body: NCAA
- Divisions: Division I
- Country: United States
- Region: Big Central

The Big Central Soccer Conference was a Division I soccer conference in the NCAA. It was originally known as the Big Central Six Soccer Conference. The founding members were Southern Illinois University Edwardsville (SIU Edwardsville or SIUE), Quincy College (now Quincy University), Marquette University, Northern Illinois University, and the University of Wisconsin-Milwaukee (now athletically branded as "Milwaukee"), with the University of Cincinnati joining in 1988.

Three of the founding members—Quincy, SIU Edwardsville, and Wisconsin–Milwaukee—were Division II schools that played Division I men's soccer (Milwaukee moved to Division I for all sports in 1990, and SIUE did the same in 2008). The conference existed from 1987 through 1990 with nine member schools in its short history. In 1991, the primary conferences of all but the two remaining Division II schools, SIU Edwardsville and Quincy, sponsored competition in men's soccer. Since only the two Division II schools had a need for the Big Central, the conference ceased to exist, and those two, Quincy and SIUE, joined the division II Great Lakes Valley Conference in all sports following a brief period as independents and two seasons in the Mid-Continent Conference.

== Members ==
Team	Period	Ref
Cincinnati Bearcats	1988–90	
Drake Bulldogs	1988–90	
Louisville Cardinals	1989–90	
Marquette Warriors	1987–88	
Northern Illinois Huskies	1987–89	
Quincy Hawks	1987–90	
SIU Edwardsville Cougars	1987–90	
Wisconsin–Milwaukee Panthers	1987–90	
Wright State Raiders	1990	

== Standings ==
1987 Big Central Soccer Conference standings
	Conf.					Overall
Team	W		L		T	W		L		T
Quincy	2	–	0	–	2	13	–	4	–	2
SIU Edwardsville	2	–	0	–	2	9	–	8	–	3
Wisconsin–Milwaukee	1	–	2	–	1	11	–	8	–	2
Marquette	1	–	2	–	1	9	–	11	–	1
Northern Illinois	1	–	3	–	0	6	–	10	–	2
Cincinnati*	0	–	0	–	0	9	–	9	–	1
Rankings from NSCAA *-Charter member did not compete

1988 Big Central Soccer Conference standings
	Conf.					Overall
Team	W		L		T	W		L		T
Quincy $	5	–	1	–	0	12	–	6	–	2
SIU Edwardsville	4	–	2	–	0	10	–	9	–	2
Cincinnati	3	–	2	–	1	12	–	7	–	2
Wisconsin–Milwaukee	3	–	3	–	0	9	–	12	–	0
Drake	2	–	2	–	2	10	–	7	–	4
Marquette	2	–	3	–	1	12	–	7	–	2
Northern Illinois	0	–	6	–	0	7	–	10	–	1
$ – Conference champion; Rankings from NSCAA

1989 Big Central Soccer Conference standings
	Conf.					Overall
Team	W		L		T	W		L		T
Cincinnati	5	–	1	–	0	14	–	4	–	1
Wisconsin–Milwaukee	5	–	1	–	0	12	–	5	–	3
Northern Illinois $	4	–	2	–	0	14	–	4	–	2
Quincy	3	–	3	–	0	12	–	8	–	1
SIU Edwardsville	2	–	4	–	0	11	–	9	–	1
Drake	1	–	5	–	0	9	–	10	–	0
Louisville	1	–	5	–	0	8	–	11	–	2
$ – Conference champion; Rankings from NSCAA

1990 Big Central Soccer Conference standings
	Conf.					Overall
Team	W		L		T	W		L		T
No. 20 Wisconsin–Milwaukee $	4	–	1	–	0	16	–	4	–	2
SIU Edwardsville	4	–	2	–	0	11	–	10	–	1
Drake	4	–	2	–	0	10	–	8	–	4
Wright State	3	–	1	–	0	12	–	6	–	2
Cincinnati	3	–	3	–	0	9	–	10	–	2
Quincy	1	–	4	–	0	7	–	11	–	0
Louisville	0	–	6	–	0	2	–	13	–	2
$ – Conference champion; Rankings from NSCAA

== Regular season champions ==
(From above)

- 1987 Quincy & SIUE
- 1988 Quincy
- 1989 UW-Milwaukee* & Cincinnati
- 1990 UW-Milwaukee
- * = Top seed on tiebreaker.

== Tournament champions ==
- 1987 No tourney
- 1988 Quincy
- 1989 Northern Illinois (Beat UW-M on PKs)
- 1990 Wisconsin-Milwaukee
