= Karenza =

Karenza may refer to:

- Skol Veythrin Karenza, a Cornish-speaking school in Cornwall
- 'Karenza', a daffodil cultivar named by Arthur Boscawen

== People with the given name ==
- Karenza Mathews (born 1950), English table tennis player

== See also ==
- Carenza (disambiguation)
- Charenza
- Polwhele House School, whose Polwhele family has the motto Karenza wheelas Karenza (Cornish for "Love seeks out love")
