= Energizer Park =

Soccer stadium in St. Louis, United States

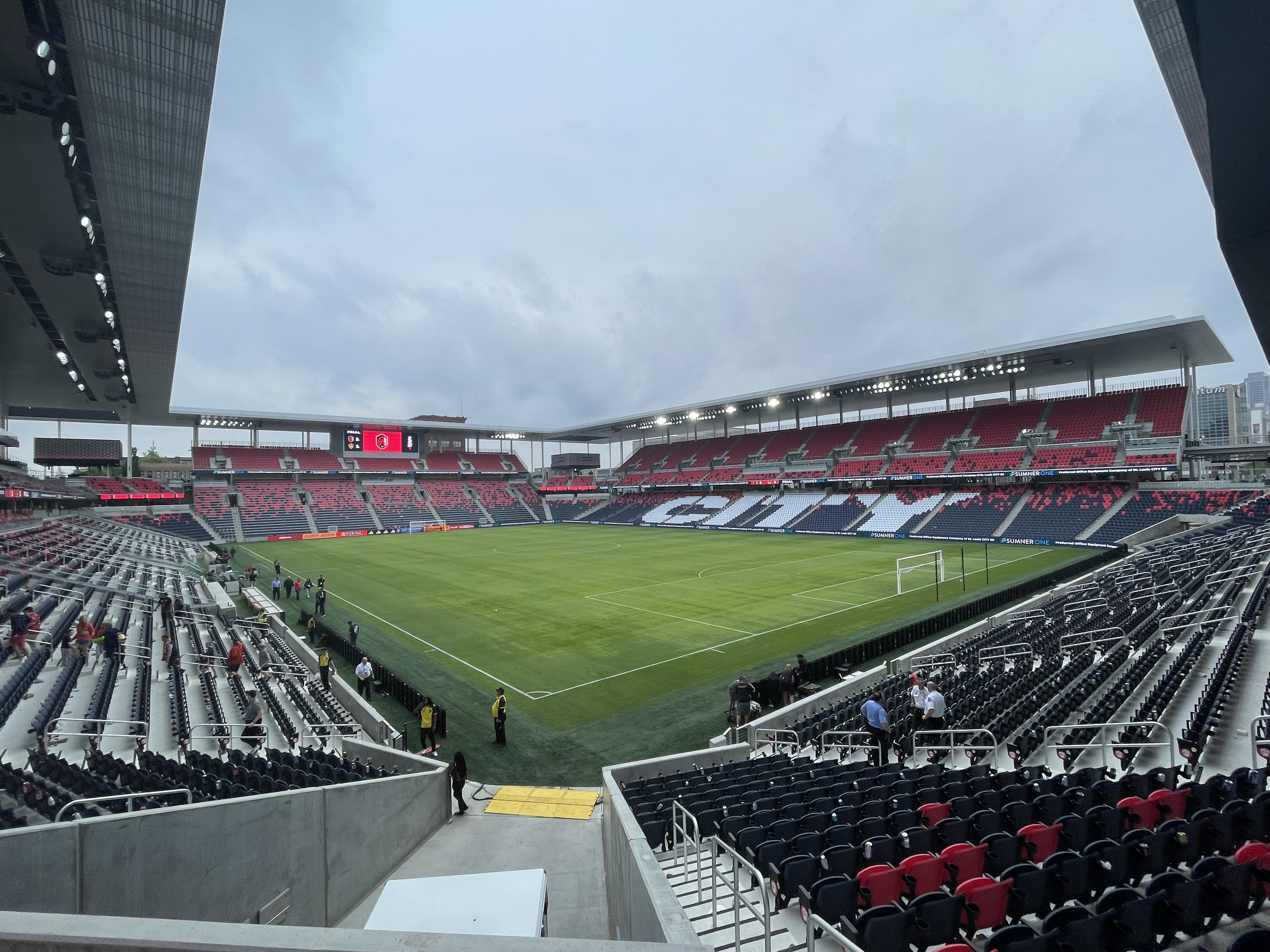
- Energizer Park in 2023

- Location in Missouri Location in the United States
- Former names: St. Louis City Stadium (planning/construction); Centene Stadium (February–October 2022); CityPark (2023–2024)
- Address: 2019 Market Street
- Location: St. Louis, Missouri, U.S.
- Coordinates: 38°37′53″N 90°12′37″W
- Operator: St. Louis City SC
- Capacity: 22,423
- Type: Soccer-specific stadium
- Surface: Bermuda Grass
- Record attendance: 22,423 (Soccer; U.S. Open Cup - St. Louis City SC vs. Union Omaha; April 25, 2023)
- Field size: 114 × 74 yards
- Public transit: Red Blue at Union Station

Construction
- Groundbreaking: February 2020
- Opened: November 16, 2022
- Cost: $457.8 million
- Architects: HOK and Snow Kreilich Architects

Tenants
- St. Louis City SC (MLS) 2023–present; St. Louis City 2 (MLSNP) 2023–present

Website
- stlcitysc.com/stadium

Energizer Park, previously CityPark, is a 22,423-seat soccer-specific stadium in St. Louis, Missouri, United States. It is the home of St. Louis City SC, the city's Major League Soccer (MLS) franchise. The stadium is next to Union Station in the city's Downtown West neighborhood, and was completed in November 2022, ahead of the 2023 MLS season. The stadium is also the home of St. Louis City 2 of MLS Next Pro.

The stadium's naming rights were initially acquired by healthcare company Centene Corporation in 2022. It was known as Centene Stadium until Centene rescinded its naming rights agreement later that year; the club announced CityPark as the stadium's new name. Energizer signed a new naming rights agreement that took effect in 2025.

== History ==
=== Original proposal ===
In February 2016, MLS began the search for a downtown site to house a soccer-specific stadium. One of the locations surveyed had previously been intended for a stadium for the St. Louis Rams before the team moved back to Los Angeles.

On February 17, an exploratory group of local businessmen calling itself "MLS2STL" formed with the goal of bringing an MLS franchise to St. Louis. Among its members were St. Louis Cardinals President Bill DeWitt III, UniGroup President Jim Powers, St. Louis Blues CEO Chris Zimmerman, Saint Louis FC owner Jim Kavanaugh and Dave Peacock, former president of Anheuser-Busch who had recently co-chaired the unsuccessful NFL stadium task force.

On November 18, a proposal for a $200 million stadium, to be built on 30 acres (12 ha) of land owned by the Missouri Department of Transportation, was unveiled. The land was the site of off-ramps from Interstate 64 that were the remnants of a North-South Distributor Highway that was never built. The proposal included a request for $80 million in public money, not counting potential additional land purchases. At the same time, the full prospective ownership group was also unveiled, led by Paul Edgerley, the former managing director of Bain Capital in Boston, and including Peacock, Powers, and Kavanaugh from the original exploratory group.

==== Opposition and failed public funding vote ====
On December 19, Missouri governor-elect Eric Greitens came out against any public funding for the project, calling it "nothing more than welfare for millionaires." Edgerley said that without public funding, it would be "hard to get" an expansion franchise in St. Louis. A competing prospective ownership group, Foundry St. Louis, offered to pay the $80 million public portion if they were allowed to join SC STL's bid for MLS expansion. SC STL later asked for $40 million in state funds, but Greitens reiterated his opposition to any public contribution from the state, either tax credits or direct subsidy.

The project was endangered in January 2017 when Alderwoman Christine Ingrassia withdrew the proposal to put the $80 million public contribution to a vote. Ingrassia said that SC STL was "asking for way more than I feel like we could support here in the city."

By the end of January, the St. Louis Board of Aldermen revised the stadium bill, this time with a public contribution reduced to $60 million. It was passed on February 3, after the 10-week statutory cutoff before the public vote, requiring a judge's approval to be placed on the ballot. That approval came on February 9, when St. Louis Circuit Court Judge Michael Mullen issued a ruling allowing the city election board to add two funding measures to the city ballot.

With the city contribution on its way to the voters, SC STL formally applied for an MLS franchise on January 31, 2017.

The stadium proposal was brought to a public vote on the April 4, 2017, general municipal ballot, where it was defeated 53 to 47 percent. This defeat was seen as being potentially fatal to SC STL's efforts to bring MLS to St. Louis. However, there were reports indicating that St. Louis' bid for an MLS franchise was still active.

=== Revived proposal and construction ===
On October 9, 2018, the group "MLS 4 The Lou" announced a new proposal to build a soccer-specific stadium on the same land next to Union Station. The new ownership group was led by the Taylor family, founders of St. Louis based Enterprise Holdings, and Jim Kavanaugh, CEO of St. Louis based World Wide Technology and USL Championship side Saint Louis FC owner. The Taylor family members forming the group would make the team majority-owned by women, the first in the league and one of few ownership groups majority-controlled by women in all of professional sports. Given Kavanaugh's stake in both the MLS bid and Saint Louis FC, many people assumed that the new MLS team would inherit the Saint Louis FC identity, similar to other recent MLS expansions. However, the team ownership group clarified that this would not be the case.

Unlike previous proposals, the ownership group did not ask for any public funding for the stadium. The stadium would be privately funded and owned by the team, with upkeep funded by a tax on tickets and items sold at the stadium. Despite the lack of up-front public financing, the group did receive over $60 million in tax incentives from St. Louis, in the form of amusement and real-estate tax breaks, among other tax considerations.

The proposal had widespread support from public officials, including Missouri Governor Mike Parson, St. Louis Mayor Lyda Krewson, and former St. Louis County Executive Steve Stenger. The bid met all of the criteria put forth by MLS, including a solid financial backing, local government support, a strong soccer fan base, and a downtown Soccer-specific stadium with access to public transit.

On April 18, 2019, the MLS Board of Governors approved a proposal to expand to 30 teams. This was followed shortly by the release of new stadium renderings. On August 20, 2019, MLS announced it had approved St. Louis as the league's 28th franchise with the team expected to join in the 2023 season. Construction on the stadium site began in February 2020 with the closure of the exit 39 and 38B ramps off I-64 that crossed the site.

On February 15, 2022, a fifteen-year partnership with Centene Corporation was announced, renaming the stadium to Centene Stadium.

The stadium was due to open in September 2022 with two scheduled matches featuring St. Louis City 2, St. Louis City's developmental squad, but a power failure caused by an unrelated construction project forced the matches to be moved and for the stadium opening to be delayed.

On October 25, 2022, St. Louis City SC announced that the name was to be changed to CityPark. Centene, which had been looking to cut costs, backed out as the naming rights sponsor eight months after agreeing to the deal. The club announced that Centene would remain as a sponsor and that it would be searching for a new naming sponsor.

The stadium opened on November 16, 2022 with a friendly match between St. Louis City 2 and Bayer 04 Leverkusen of the German Bundesliga. Leverkusen won 3–0.

The first home MLS match for St. Louis City SC was played March 4, 2023, hosting Charlotte FC. The first MLS goal scored in the stadium was scored in the 25th minute for Charlotte by Enzo Copetti; the match ended in a 3–1 win for St. Louis City SC, with goals scored by Eduard Löwen and João Klauss for City SC, in addition to an own-goal scored by Charlotte's Bill Tuiloma.

=== Rebranding to Energizer Park ===
On October 31, 2024, St. Louis City SC announced that CityPark will be renamed Energizer Park starting in 2025. Energizer, a St. Louis-based company that manufactures batteries, signed a naming rights agreement for an undisclosed fee and length of time. Along with the naming rights, the club announced a new premium seating section in the stadium, presented by Energizer to deliver an 'immersive fan experience'.

== Design ==
The stadium is built within historic Mill Creek Valley, a once-thriving Black neighborhood that was displaced through eminent domain and urban renewal in the late 1950s. Outside the stadium entrance, the "Pillars of the Valley" monument by Damon Davis memorializes the neighborhood and past residents.

The stadium features a grass pitch 40 feet (12 m) below street level, surrounded by two tiers of seating totaling 22,423 seats (with the ability to add an additional 2,500), topped with a clear plastic awning to keep out weather while keeping in crowd noise and avoiding disrupting shadows on the pitch. Every seat is within 120 feet (37 m) of the pitch, the closest of any stadium in Major League Soccer.

The stadium contains a supporters' section with space for more than 3,000 standing spectators, three capo stands, a 257-foot (78 m) long integrated tifo rigging system, a drum platform for drum corps during matches, and a dedicated supporters bar.

== Notable events ==
Date	Home team	Result	Away team	Competition	Attendance
November 16, 2022	St. Louis CITY2 (United States)	0–3	(Germany) Bayer 04 Leverkusen	Club Friendly / CITYPARK opener	22,423
April 11, 2023	United States	1–0	Republic of Ireland	Women's International Friendly	22,294
June 28, 2023	Jamaica	4–1	Trinidad and Tobago	2023 CONCACAF Gold Cup Group A	21,216
June 28, 2023	United States	6–0	Saint Kitts and Nevis	2023 CONCACAF Gold Cup Group A	21,216
September 2, 2023	SIUE Cougars (women's)	1–5	Saint Louis Billikens (women's)	2023 Bronze Boot	8,574
September 2, 2023	Saint Louis Billikens (men's)	0–2	SIUE Cougars (men's)	2023 Bronze Boot	8,574
September 9, 2023	United States	3–0	Uzbekistan	International Friendly	15,569
September 8, 2024	SIUE Cougars (women's)	1–6	Saint Louis Billikens (women's)	2024 Bronze Boot	6,128
September 8, 2024	Saint Louis Billikens (men's)	0–1	SIUE Cougars (men's)	2024 Bronze Boot	6,128
November 18, 2024	United States	4–2	Jamaica	2024–25 CONCACAF Nations League A	21,080
June 3, 2025	United States	4–0	Jamaica	Women's International Friendly	17,689
July 2, 2025	United States	2–1	Guatemala	2025 CONCACAF Gold Cup semifinal	22,423
July 30, 2025	St. Louis City SC (United States)	1–2	(England) Aston Villa	Club Friendly	22,423
June 6, 2026	Bosnia and Herzegovina	1–1	Panama	International Friendly	20,000
September 29, 2026	United States	4–2	Chile	International Friendly	21,680

=== 2028 Summer Olympics ===
The stadium will host eight soccer matches during the 2028 Summer Olympics, marking the first Olympic competition of any kind to be held in St. Louis since the city hosted the 1904 Summer Olympics.

== See also ==
- Soccer-specific stadium
- List of Major League Soccer stadiums
