= Ralph Korte Stadium =

Stadium in Edwardsville, Illinois

- The Ralph
- Interactive map of Ralph Korte Stadium
- Former names: The Stadium @ Bob Guelker Field; Cougar Field
- Address: Stadium Drive; SIUE Campus
- Location: Edwardsville, Illinois
- Coordinates: 38.781755°N 90.011379°W
- Owner: Southern Illinois University
- Operator: Southern Illinois University Athletics
- Seating type: Bleachers
- Capacity: 3,000 seats +1,000 on lawn
- Type: Stadium
- Surface: Artificial turf
- Scoreboard: Electronic
- Record attendance: Soccer = 8,000+ (est.); Current Config. = 4,665; T&F = 11,07
- Field size: Field: 120x75 yards Track: 400 meter oval
- Current use: Soccer; Track and field

Construction
- Built: 1993–94
- Opened: 24 June 1994; 32 years ago
- Renovated: 2013 (latest)
- Expanded: 1993–94, 2009

Tenants
- SIU Edwardsville Cougars (NCAA) teams: men's and women's soccer; Track & field; Professional teams: St. Louis City 2 (MLS Next Pro)

Website
- siuecougars.com/ralph-korte-stadium

Ralph Korte Stadium, also known as "The Ralph", is a 4,000 seat stadium located on the campus of Southern Illinois University Edwardsville in Edwardsville, Illinois. It is home to the SIUE Cougars men's and women's soccer and outdoor track & field teams. In addition to the stands on the west side of the field, a berm was put in on the east side in 2011 to provide lawn seating for the tailgating fans known as "The East Siders."

== Construction ==
The stadium was constructed on university property surrounding the existing "Bob Guelker Field" in 1993–94 by the City of Edwardsville as a site to host the 1994 U.S. Olympic Festival. In 1998, the university trustees named the stadium to honor Ralph Korte, the founder of The Korte Company of Highland, an SIUE alumnus and strong advocate of the school.

The soccer playing surface was named, on November 1, 1986, in honor of Bob Guelker, the coach who inaugurated SIUE's men's soccer program and led it to the NCAA Division II championship in 1972 and the Division I crown in 1979.

== Usage ==
The Korte Stadium and its earlier incarnation, Cougar Field, has hosted the NCAA Division I Men's Soccer Championship in 1970 and 1975, the 1972 Division II Men's Soccer Championship, and the Division II NCAA Men's Outdoor Track and Field Championship in 1997, 1998, 2001, and 2003. It was also the home stadium for the Saint Louis Athletica of Women's Professional Soccer for part of their 2009 season, during which the capacity was expanded to 5,000 seats; the team later started playing at Anheuser-Busch Soccer Park. As its permanent home of Energizer Park would not finish construction until later in the year, St. Louis City 2 played most of its inaugural MLS Next Pro season in 2022 at Korte Stadium, initially splitting time between it and Hermann Stadium on the Saint Louis University campus before moving fully to Edwardsville in the second half of the season.

== Features ==
The track features eight 48-inch lanes, with European-style broad turns (118 meters) and short straightaways (82 meters). The field event facilities include high jump aprons; pole vault runways; long jump/triple jump pits; shot put, discus, and hammer throw rings; and javelin throw runways on the west side, just outside the stadium grandstand.

The Gateway Arch on the St. Louis riverfront, 25 miles to the southwest, can be seen from the top of the stands at The Ralph.

== Record attendance ==
The record single-day attendance for a track & field competition is 11,072 on July 10, 1994 at the U.S. Olympic Festival.

Although an estimated crowd of over 8,000 was present for the 1971 Bronze Boot game versus St. Louis at Cougar Field, the largest soccer crowd in the stadium's current configuration was 4,665 for the Homecoming game against Bradley on October 4, 2014.

Preceded by Spartan Stadium; Busch Memorial Stadium	Host of the College Cup; 1970; 1975	Succeeded by Miami Orange Bowl; Franklin Field
