= Joe Carenza Sr. =

American soccer player and coach

Joseph S. Carenza Sr. (November 9, 1924 – October 17, 1981) was a U.S. soccer midfielder who played for numerous St. Louis teams in the 1940s and 1950s. He went on to coach the Washington University Bears men's soccer team from 1959 to 1964. He is a member of the National Soccer Hall of Fame.

== Player ==
Carenza was born and raised in St. Louis, Missouri. He served in the Navy during World War II. After the war, he joined the amateur team St. Margaret's Senior in the St. Louis Catholic Youth Council (CYC). In the late 1940s, he joined the Steamfitters of St. Louis Major League, before moving to Patterson and then St. Louis Simpkins-Ford. In 1951, he played for Zenthoefer Furs, who won the St. Louis Major League by ten points over Simpkins. In 1954, he became a player-coach for St. Louis Kutis. During his time with Kutis, the team won the 1956 and 1957 National Amateur Cup and the 1957 National Challenge Cup. In 1958, he moved to back to Simpkins.

== Coach ==
In 1959, Washington University in St. Louis hired Carenza to establish a men's soccer team. Carenza was the head coach of the team through the 1964 season, amassing a 31-17-6 (.630) record. Carenza died in St. Louis on October 17, 1981.

In 1982, Carenza was inducted into the National Soccer Hall of Fame. In 1996, he was inducted into the Washington University Sports Hall of Fame.

== Family ==
He married Mary Ella Newsome after returning from World War II. Their four children include Joseph Carenza Jr., John Carenza, Christopher Carenza, and Mary Lisa Carenza Keenan.

Joe Carenza Jr. also coached the men's soccer team at Washington University, and joined his father in their Hall of Fame in 2004. John Carenza became an Olympic soccer player. Both John and his brother Chris Carenza played professionally in the North American Soccer League.
