= Chris Carenza =

American soccer player (born 1952)

Personal information
- Full name: Christopher James Carenza
- Date of birth: March 3, 1952 (age 74)
- Place of birth: St. Louis, Missouri, U.S.
- Position: Defender

Youth career
- 1971–1974: SIU Edwardsville Cougars

Senior career*
Years	Team	Apps	(Gls)
1975–1976	San Antonio Thunder	37	(0)
1977	Team Hawaii	13	(0)
- * Club domestic league appearances and goals

Christopher James Carenza is an American retired soccer defender who played professionally in the North American Soccer League.

== College ==
Carenza, son of Hall of Famer Joe Carenza, Sr. and brother of John Carenza, graduated from St. Mary's High School in St. Louis, Missouri in 1970. He attended Southern Illinois University at Edwardsville where he played on the men's soccer team from 1971 to 1974. In 1972, he led the team in scoring and scored the winning goal in the NCAA Men's Division II Soccer Championship. He was also a 1974 Honorable Mention All American. In 2005, SIUE inducted Carenza into the school's Athletic Hall of Fame. He was inducted into the St. Louis Soccer Hall of Fame in 2004.

== Professional ==
In 1975, Carenza signed with the San Antonio Thunder of the North American Soccer League. In 1977, the Thunder moved to Hawaii to become Team Hawaii. Carenza played that season, then left the league.

Carenza spent a few months beginning in October 1978 with London Football League side Leyton Orient. In December 1978, after seven reserve outings and an appearance against Sweden's IFK Goteborg in a friendly he was offered a professional contract. However, he tore his groin in a training session, and had to return home. Once recovered he signed for Team Hawaii in 1978, but retired from the game soon after and went into coaching.

In later years he became an Assistant Attorney General in Missouri and in March 2012 he was appointed the executive director of the Vehicle Protection Association, a position he still held in July 2013.
