= Cincinnati Bearcats men's soccer =

Defunct soccer team of the University of Cincinnati

- Founded: 1982
- Folded: 2020
- University: University of Cincinnati
- Head coach: Hylton Dayes (18th season)
- Conference: American
- Location: Cincinnati, Ohio, US
- Stadium: Gettler Stadium (capacity: 1,400)
- Nickname: Cats
- Colors: Red and black

NCAA tournament Round of 32
- 1998

NCAA tournament appearances
- 1998, 2003, 2006

Conference Regular Season championships
- 1989

For information on all University of Cincinnati sports, see Cincinnati Bearcats

The Cincinnati Bearcats men's soccer team represented the University of Cincinnati in all NCAA Division I men's college soccer competitions. Cincinnati previously competed in various conferences including the American Athletic Conference, Big East Conference, Conference USA, the Great Midwest Conference and the Big Central Soccer Conference. The Bearcats played their home fixtures at Gettler Stadium on the University of Cincinnati campus in Cincinnati, Ohio. Cincinnati was most recently coached by Hylton Dayes, a former player who had coached the Bearcats since 2001.

The University of Cincinnati Department of Athletics discontinued its men's soccer program effective immediately, Director of Athletics John Cunningham announced on April 14, 2020.

The men's soccer program dated to 1973 with an all-time record of 385–408–84. The Bearcats were 5–11–1 in 2019 and longtime head coach Hylton Dayes stepped down following the season.

== Seasons ==
The following is a list of Cincinnati's records since forming in 1982.

Statistics overview
Season	Coach	Overall	Conference	Standing	Postseason
Cincinnati (Independent) (1973–1987)
1973	Dick Kleinschmidt	7–5–2			
1974	Dick Kleinschmidt	9–10–1			
1975	Jim McDowell	7–8–2			
1976	Jim McDowell	8–7–0			
1976	Jim McDowell	8–7–0			
1977	Jim McDowell	11–4–0			
1978	Jim McDowell	9–7–1			
1979	Jim McDowell	8–10–0			
1980	Jim McDowell	7–10–1			
1981	Jim McDowell	6–9–3			
1982	Jim McDowell	9–5–2			
1983	Jim McDowell	7–10–1			
1984	Bob Muro	10–7–1			
1985	Bob Muro	12–6–0			
1986	Bob Muro	11–8–0			
1987	Bob Muro	9–9–1			
Independent Total:		0–0–0			
Cincinnati (Big Central Soccer Conference) (1988–1990)
1988	Bob Muro	12–7–2	3–2–1	3rd	
1989	Bob Muro	14–4–1	5–1–0	1st	
1990	Bob Muro	9–10–2	3–3–0	5th	
Big Central Total:		35–21–5	11–6–1		
Cincinnati (Great Midwest Conference) (1991–1994)
1991	Bob Muro	9–12–1	2–2–1	3rd	
1992	Bob Muro	10–11–0	2–3–0	4th	
1993	Bob Muro	9–9–3	1–2–2	5th	
1994	Bob Muro	3–14–1	1–5–0	6th	
Great Midwest Total:		31–46–5	6–12–3		
Cincinnati (Conference USA) (1995–2004)
1995	Bob Muro	6–14–1	4–4–0		
1996	Jeff Cook	7–12–3	0–6–2		
1997	Jeff Cook	7–8–3	2–4–2		
1998	Jeff Cook	11–5–3	4–3–1		NCAA First Round
1999	Jeff Cook	11–8–1	3–5–0		
2000	Jeff Cook	7–9–3	3–2–3		
2001	Hylton Dayes	7–8–4	5–4–1		
2002	Hylton Dayes	10–8–3	5–4–1		
2003	Hylton Dayes	10–4–6	6–2–1		NCAA First Round
2004	Hylton Dayes	7–10–2	5–3–1		
Conference USA Total:		0–0–0	0–0–0		
Cincinnati (Big East Conference) (2005–2012)
2005	Hylton Dayes	10–7–2	6–3–2		
2006	Hylton Dayes	11–6–2	7–3–1		NCAA First Round
2007	Hylton Dayes	9–10–2	5–5–1		
2008	Hylton Dayes	7–10–2	4–6–1		
2009	Hylton Dayes	8–10–0	3–7–0		
2010	Hylton Dayes	7–5–7	5–1–3		
2011	Hylton Dayes	6–11–1	2–7–0		
2012	Hylton Dayes	6–9–4	3–4–2		
Big East Conference Total:		0–0–0	0–0–0		
Cincinnati (American Athletic Conference) (2013–2019)
2013	Hylton Dayes	6–12–1	1–7–0		
2014	Hylton Dayes	5–10–3	2–5–1		
2015	Hylton Dayes	7–9–3	1–4–3		
2016	Hylton Dayes	9–7–1	3–4–0	4th	
2017	Hylton Dayes	7–9–1	0–7–0	8th	
2018	Hylton Dayes	3–14–1	1–6–0	8th	
2019	Hylton Dayes	5–11–1	1–5–1	7th	
American Athletic Conference Total:		0–0–0	0–0–0		
Total:		0–0–0			
National champion Postseason invitational champion Conference regular season champion Conference regular season and conference tournament champion Division regular season champion Division regular season and conference tournament champion Conference tournament champion

=== NCAA tournament results ===
Cincinnati appeared in three NCAA tournaments. They held a combined record of 0–2–1.

Year	Record	Seed	Region	Round	Opponent	Results
1998	11–5–3	N/A	Bloomington	First round	Butler	L 0–1 (OT)
2003	10–4–6	N/A	1	First round	Kentucky	T 0–0 ^{L PK} (OT)
2006	11–6–2	N/A	3	First round	Northwestern	L 0–3
