= Cale Wassermann =

American soccer coach

Personal information
- Date of birth: October 24, 1983 (age 43)
- Place of birth: United States
- Position: Midfielder

Youth career
- Years: Team
- 2002–2005: Saginaw Valley State Cardinals

Managerial career
- 2006–2007: Saginaw Valley State Cardinals (assistant)
- 2006: Saginaw Heritage High School JV
- 2008–2009: Lewis Flyers (assistant)
- 2009–2014: Saginaw Valley State Cardinals
- 2014–2018: Michigan State Spartans (assistant)
- 2019–: SIU Edwardsville Cougars

Cale Wassermann (born October 24, 1983) is the head coach of the SIU Edwardsville Cougars men's soccer team.

== Youth ==
As a high school student in his native Southfield, Michigan, Wasserman was twice named to the Michigan All-State first team.

Attending college as a four-year midfielder at Saginaw Valley State University, he was team captain and was named to the All-Great Lakes Intercollegiate Athletic Conference (GLIAC) first team in both 2004 and 2005

== Coaching career ==
In 2006 and 2007 Wassermann was a volunteer assistant for the men's soccer team at Saginaw Valley State. In 2006, he also served as the head coach of the junior varsity boys' soccer team at Saginaw Heritage High School. In 2007, he was head trainer and coach for Saginaw area youth teams.

In 2008 and 2009, Wassermann was an assistant coach for the Lewis University Flyers men's soccer team of the Division II Great Lakes Valley Conference (GVLC). The Flyers played in the NCAA Division II Men's Soccer Championship Tournament during both seasons, advancing to the Regional Championship match in 2008 and to the College Cup semifinals in 2009.

From 2010 through 2014, Wassermann was head coach at his alma mater, Saginaw Valley State. Taking over a program without a winning tradition, he quickly turned SVSU into a national power in Division II, advancing to the national championship game in only his third season. In his five-year tenure at SVSU, his Cardinals teams won two GLIAC season championships, two GLIAC tournament championships, and advanced to the NCAA tournament in 2011, 2012, and 2014. Wassermann received GLIAC Coach of the Year honors in 2011 and 2012. After the 2012 Cardinals advanced to the Division II College Cup championship game. Wassweman was named both the Midwest Region Coach of the Year and the Division II National Coach of the Year by the National Soccer Coaches Association of America (NSCAA) (now known as the United Soccer Coaches).

From 2014 through 2018, Wassermann was assistant coach and recruiting coordinator for the Michigan State Spartans. With Wassermann on staff, the Spartans were in the NCAA tournament in 2016, 2017, and 2018.. The 2018 squad reached the NCAA College Cup before being beaten by Akron in the national semifinals. The 2018 squad advanced to the quarterfinals, and the 2016 team was upset on penalty kicks in the NCAA first round by SIUE. At Michigan State, Wassermann coached two All-America selections, 13 All-Region picks, and 17 All-Big Ten performers, including the 2016 Big Ten Freshman of the Year, 2017 Goalkeeper of the Year, and 2018 Midfielder of the Year.

On January 17, 2019, Wassermann was announced as the new head coach of the SIUE Cougars. He told the St. Louis Post-Dispatch that, of the 11 available Division I head coaching positions, SIUE was the only school that was desirable enough for him to apply. He also said that he had been aware of the program since playing against the Cougars as a midfielder at SVSU.

Wassermann has also previously served as the head coach for the Under-18 USA Youth team for Maccabi USA and as the associate head coach for Detroit City FC of the National Premier Soccer League (NPSL).

== Personal ==
Cale Wassermann is a native of Southfield, Michigan and played high school soccer at Birmingham Groves.

Wassermann received his bachelor's degree in communication from Saginaw Valley State University in 2007. In 2015, he earned a master's degree in higher education from Lewis University.

Wassermann and his wife, Shelby, welcomed their son, Judah, in May 2019.

== Coaching record ==
Record table
Season	Team	Overall	Conference	Standing	Postseason
Saginaw Valley State University Cardinals (GLIAC) (2010–2014)
2010	SVSU Cardinals	9–6–3	4–5–3	t-4th	
2011	SVSU Cardinals	12–5–3	7–3–1	1st	NCAA DII 1st round
2012	SVSU Cardinals	18–3–4	9–2–2	1st (North)	NCAA DII runners-up
2013	SVSU Cardinals	11–4–5	8–2–4	3rd	
2014	SVSU Cardinals	14–5–2	9–3–2	t-3rd	NCAA DII Round of 16
SVSU Cardinals:		64–23–17 (.697)	37–15–12 (.672)		
Southern Illinois University Edwardsville Cougars (MAC) (2019–2021)
2019	SIUE Cougars	8–5–4	2–1–2	3rd	MAC Tournament Quarterfinal
2020	SIUE Cougars	5–5–0	2–5–0	6th	
SIUE Cougars (MAC):		13–10–4 (.556)	4–6–2 (.417)		
Southern Illinois University Edwardsville Cougars (Missouri Valley) (2021–2022)
2021	SIUE Cougars	6–10–2	4–6–0	3rd	MVC Tournament Quarterfinal
2022	SIUE Cougars	5–9–2	2–6–0	6th	MVC Tournament Quarterfinal
SIUE Cougars (MVC):		11–19–4 (.382)	6–12–0 (.333)		
Southern Illinois University Edwardsville Cougars (Ohio Valley) (2023–present)
2023	SIUE Cougars	16–1–3	9–0–1	1st	NCAA DI 1st round
SIUE Cougars (OVC):		16–1–3 (.875)	9–0–1 (.950)		
SIUE Cougars:		40–30–11 (.562)	19–18–3 (.513)		
Total:		104–53–28 (.638)			
National champion Postseason invitational champion Conference regular season champion Conference regular season and conference tournament champion Division regular season champion Division regular season and conference tournament champion Conference tournament champion
