= SIU Edwardsville Cougars women's soccer =

American college soccer team

- Founded: 1981; 45 years ago
- University: Southern Illinois University Edwardsville
- Head coach: Derek Burton (14th season)
- Conference: Ohio Valley Conference
- Location: Edwardsville, Illinois, US
- Stadium: Ralph Korte Stadium (capacity: 4,000)
- Nickname: Cougars
- Colors: Red and white
Home	Away

NCAA tournament Round of 32
- 2016

NCAA tournament appearances
- D I: 2014, 2016, 2020, 2021; D II: 1993, 1996, 1998, 2005, 2007

Conference tournament championships
- OVC 2014, 2016, 2020, 2021

Conference regular season championships
- OVC 2014 (tie), 2021 (tie); GLVC 1998, 1999 (tie), 2004 (tie), 2007

The SIU Edwardsville Cougars women's soccer team represent Southern Illinois University Edwardsville (SIUE) in the Ohio Valley Conference of NCAA Division I soccer. The Cougars play their home matches on Bob Guelker Field at Ralph Korte Stadium located in the southwest corner of the SIUE campus in Edwardsville, Illinois. Derek Burton has been head coach since 2008.

== History ==
The program was started by Lori Stark in 1981 as a club team and was elevated to varsity status the following year. Stark departed after the 1983 season and was replaced by a series of co-head coaches.

In 1984 and 1985, the program was led by Mike Kelly and head softball coach Cindy Jones. Jones was replaced in 1986 by Ed Huneke, who also became the new men's head coach. Kelly left after five seasons and was replaced in 1989 by Brian Korbesmeyer.

In 1990, Korbesmeyer became the sole head coach, a position he held through 2002, leading the Cougars to two Great Lakes Valley Conference (GLVC) titles and three trips to the NCAA Division II Women's Soccer Championship tournament.

Cougar alumna Lynda Bowers became head coach in 2003. She led the Cougars to two more GLVC championships and two more NCAA tournaments before leaving the program after the 2007 season.

Derek Burton assumed the reins of the program in 2008 and led it into Division I and the Ohio Valley Conference (OVC).

In 2014, Burton's Cougars tied for the regular season OVC championship, then won the conference tournament to become the school's first entry in the NCAA Division I Women's Soccer Championship. Playing at heavily favored Kentucky, the Cougars held the Wildcats to a scoreless tie through regulation time and two extra periods before falling on penalty kicks.

The 2016 squad finished the regular season in fourth place with a record of only 8–7–4 (6–3–1 OVC). They got through the first round of the OVC tournament by besting Austin Peay on penalty kicks 5–4, sending them to the semifinals at top-seeded Murray State. The Racers had not lost on their home field since October 2014, but the Cougars took the victory 2–1 with 11 seconds left in the first overtime period. In the tournament final, they faced co-champions Eastern Kentucky. The Cougars scored early, then successfully argued that the referee had not let the goalkeeper get set on a penalty kick. Goalkeeper Juli Rossi blocked the re-try, and SIUE then held on to win 1–0 for their second title in three years. Playing in the NCAA tournament at heavily favored and 11th ranked Notre Dame, the Cougars held the Fighting Irish to a scoreless tie through regulation time and two extra periods. In the penalty kicks, Rossi made two saves, while the SIUE women nailed 5 of six to win 5–4 and became only the second OVC team to advance to the NCAA second round where they lost to Northwestern 1–0 at Duke.

== Players ==
=== Current roster ===
As of 18 Sep 2024

Note: Flags indicate national team as defined under FIFA eligibility rules; some limited exceptions apply. Players may hold more than one non-FIFA nationality.

No.	Pos.	Nation	Player
00	GK	USA	Tavey Duncan
0	GK	USA	Samaya Hogg
1	GK	USA	Abby Haskell
2	FW	USA	Maddie Clark
3	FW	USA	Kaitlyn Nichols
4	MF	USA	Aleah Minehart
5	DF	USA	MaryClaire Imig
6	DF	USA	Kelsey Kehoe
7	MF	USA	Kasey Neidhardt
8	MF	USA	Marin Vines
9	FW	USA	Savannah DeFini
10	DF	USA	Taylor Babb
11	MF	USA	Ava Lewis
12	MF	USA	Sydney Lane
13	MF	USA	Macie Begley

No.	Pos.	Nation	Player
14	DF	USA	Emma Czech
15	DF	USA	Matea Diekema
16	MF	USA	Ava Talley
17	FW	USA	Ella Robinson
18	DF	USA	Allie Fishering
19	MF	USA	Taryn Moore
20	MF	USA	Sidney Christopher
21	MF	USA	Mia Loza
22	DF	USA	Bella Jackson
23	FW	USA	Mackenzie Hayes
24	MF	USA	Grace Ferguson
25	DF	USA	Miranda Malcom
26	DF	USA	Mary Fetter
27	DF	USA	Calli Chiarelli
28	FW	JPN	Kira Kumada

=== All-Americans ===
Two players have been named All-Americans for their play at SIUE.

- (United States) Janece Friederich, 1996 First Team, 1998 Second Team
- (United States) Elizabeth Valenti, 2007 Second Team

One player has been named to the NSCAA Women's University Division Scholar All-American Teams.

- (United States) Samantha Jones, 2014 Third Team

== Record by year ==
Record table
Season	Coach	Overall	Conference	Standing	Postseason
SIU Edwardsville (Division II Independent) (1982–1994)
1982	Lori Stark	8–6–2			
1983	Lori Stark	5–12–0			
1984	Mike Kelley & Cindy Jones	12–5–1			
1985	Mike Kelley & Cindy Jones	8–4–2			
1986	Mike Kelley & Ed Huneke	11–6–1			
1987	Mike Kelley & Ed Huneke	9–4–1			
1988	Mike Kelley & Ed Huneke	5–13–1			
1989	Brian Korbesmeyer & Ed Huneke	6–9–1			
1990	Brian Korbesmeyer	13–5–1			
1991	Brian Korbesmeyer	9–7–1			
1992	Brian Korbesmeyer	9–5–1			
1993	Brian Korbesmeyer	11–7–1			NCAA Div. II 1st round
1995	Brian Korbesmeyer	9–3–4			
SIU Edwardsville (Great Lakes Valley Conference Div. II) (1982–1971)
1995	Brian Korbesmeyer	8–6–4	4–4–1	3rd (tie)	
1996	Brian Korbesmeyer	16–4–2	7–1–1	2nd	NCAA Div. II 1st round
1997	Brian Korbesmeyer	15–7–0	7–2–0	2nd	
1998	Brian Korbesmeyer	13–3–2	9–0–1	1st	NCAA Div. II 1st round
1999	Brian Korbesmeyer	13–6–0	9–2–0	1st	
2000	Brian Korbesmeyer	13–4–3	8–0–3	2nd	
2001	Brian Korbesmeyer	9–6–1	4–5–1	6th	
2002	Brian Korbesmeyer	9–5–4	5–1–4	3rd (tie)	
2003	Lynda Bowers	10–7–0	4–6–0	8th	
2004	Lynda Bowers	13–6–0	9–1–0	1st (tie)	
2005	Lynda Bowers	17–6–0	11–2–0	2nd	NCAA Div. II 1st round
2006	Lynda Bowers	12–5–3	8–3–2	3rd	
2007	Lynda Bowers	13–5–1	11–2–0	1st	NCAA Div. II 1st round
SIU Edwardsville (Division I Independent) (2008–2010)
2008	Derek Burton	5–8–0			
2009	Derek Burton	3–10–2			
2010	Derek Burton	8–7–1			
SIU Edwardsville (Ohio Valley Conference) (2011–present)
2011	Derek Burton	6–9–1	4–5–0	6th (tie)	
2012	Derek Burton	7–8–4	4–4–1	5th (tie)	
2013	Derek Burton	13–5–3	6–3–1	4th	
2014	Derek Burton	13–6–2	8–2–0	1st (tie)	NCAA 1st round
2015	Derek Burton	5–11–3	2–7–1	10th	
2016	Derek Burton	10–8–5	6–3–1	4th	NCAA 2nd round
2017	Derek Burton	7–10–2	4–5–1	t-6th	
2018	Derek Burton	6-9-2	4-5-1	5th	
2019	Derek Burton	10-5-5	5-2-3	t1st	OVC Tournament 2nd
2020 (spring 2021)	Derek Burton	8-2-2	7-2-2	2nd	
Total:		377–254–69	167–74–30		
National champion Postseason invitational champion Conference regular season champion Conference regular season and conference tournament champion Division regular season champion Division regular season and conference tournament champion Conference tournament champion

== See also ==
- SIU Edwardsville Cougars men's soccer
