= Kevin Kalish =

American soccer player-coach (born 1977)

Personal information
- Date of birth: March 3, 1977 (age 49)
- Place of birth: Florissant, Missouri, United States
- Height: 5 ft 10 in (1.78 m)
- Position: Defender

College career
Years	Team	Apps	(Gls)
1995–1996	Connecticut Huskies		
1997–1998	Saint Louis Billikens		

Senior career*
Years	Team	Apps	(Gls)
1999–2000	St. Louis Ambush (indoor)	33	(?)
2000–2001	Buffalo Blizzard (indoor)	7	(1)
2001–	Kansas City Attack (indoor)		

Managerial career
- 1999: Saint Louis Billikens (assistant)
- 2000–2007: SIU Edwardsville Cougars (assistant)
- 2008–2013: SIU Edwardsville Cougars
- 2018–: Saint Louis Billikens
- * Club domestic league appearances and goals

Kevin Kalish (born March 3, 1977) is an American soccer coach and former player who, as of 2018, was serving as head coach of the Saint Louis Billikens men's soccer team. He played professionally in the National Professional Soccer League.

== Youth ==
In 1995, Kalish graduated from St. Thomas Aquinas-Mercy High School. During his four-year prep soccer career, Kalish was three-time All State as Aquinas-Mercy won the 1992 and 1993 State Championships. His senior season, he was the MVP of the Midwest Championship and a Parade Magazine High School All American. In 1995, Kalish entered the University of Connecticut where he was a two-year starter on the men's soccer team. He played defender as well as attacking and holding midfield. Following his sophomore season, he transferred to St. Louis University. He finished his collegiate career with two seasons as a Billiken. He was a 1998 First Team All American. He graduated in 1999 with a bachelor's degree in marketing. In 2007, St. Louis University inducted Kalish into its Athletic Hall of Fame. During his collegiate career, Kalish continued to play club soccer with Scott Gallagher, winning the 1998 U-23 National Championship with them.

== Professional ==
In 1998, the St. Louis Ambush of the National Professional Soccer League drafted Kalish. He did not sign with them. On February 8, 1999, the Kansas City Wizards selected Kalish in the third round (26th overall) of the 1999 MLS College Draft. The Nashville Metros also drafted Kalish. On November 16, 1999, Kalish signed with the Ambush. When the Ambush folded at the end of the season, Kalish moved to the Buffalo Blizzard. On January 26, 2001, the Blizzard traded Kalish to the Kansas City Attack for Chris Handsor.

== Coach ==
In 1999, Kalish served as an assistant coach with the Saint Louis Billikens. In 2000, he moved to Southern Illinois University Edwardsville as an assistant. In 2008, he became the Cougars' head coach.

On December 6, 2013, he resigned to assume a position with the St. Louis Scott Gallagher Soccer Club that would allow him to spend more time with his family.

On January 20, 2018, he was named head coach of his alma mater, St. Louis University,

== Record by Year ==
Record table
Season	Coach	Overall	Conference	Standing	Postseason
SIU Edwardsville (Division I Independent) (2008–2009)
2008	SIUE Cougars	5–8–1			
2009	SIUE Cougars	5–9–3			
SIU Edwardsville (Missouri Valley Conference) (2010–2016)
2010	SIUE Cougars	10–5–4	4–1–2	2nd of 8	
2011	SIUE Cougars	8–8–4	1–4–1	6th of 7	
2012	SIUE Cougars	13–7–0	4–2–0	2nd of 7	
2013	SIUE Cougars	8–9–2	3–3–0	4th of 7	
SIUE Cougars:		49–46–14 .514			
Saint Louis Billikens (Atlantic 10 Conference) (2018–present)
2018	SLU Billikens	6–4–7	3–1–4	5th of 13	
2019	SLU Billikens	10–7–0	6–2–0	4th of 13	
2020	SLU Billikens	9–5–0 *	4–2–0 *	2nd of 4	
2021	SLU Billikens	16–1–4	8–0–0	1st of 13	NCAA Elite Eight
2022	SLU Billikens	12–5–3	6–1–1	1st of 14	NCAA 2nd Round
2023	SLU Billikens	8–4–5	4–1–3	2nd of 14 tie	
SLU Billikens:		61–26–19 (.665)	31–7–8 (.761)		
Total:		110–65–29 .610			
National champion Postseason invitational champion Conference regular season champion Conference regular season and conference tournament champion Division regular season champion Division regular season and conference tournament champion Conference tournament champion

*=2020 season curtailed due to the COVID-19 pandemic.
