= Bob Guelker =

American soccer coach

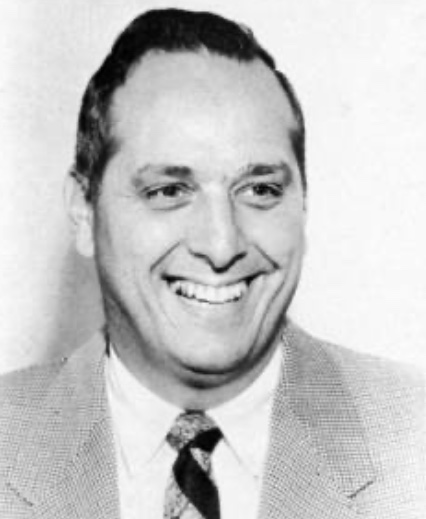
- Guelker in 1964

Personal information
- Full name: Robert Guelker
- Date of birth: June 26, 1923
- Place of birth: St. Louis, Missouri, United States
- Date of death: February 22, 1986 (aged 62)
- Place of death: United States

Managerial career
- Years: Team
- St. Louis Preparatory Seminary
- 1959–1966: Saint Louis Billikens
- 1967–1985: SIU Edwardsville Cougars

Robert Guelker (June 26, 1923 – February 22, 1986) was an American soccer coach and administrator. He coached 24 years at the collegiate level, including coaching St. Louis University to five championships (1959, 1960, 1962, 1963, 1965). He coached the U.S. teams at both the 1971 Pan American Games and the 1972 Summer Olympics. He was president of the United States Soccer Football Association from 1967 to 1969 and is a member of the National Soccer Hall of Fame.

== Coach ==
After graduating from Saint Louis University (SLU), Guelker coached soccer at St. Louis Preparatory Seminary. In 1958, he approached SLU regarding establishing a men's soccer team. The university agreed and Guelker, working on a shoestring budget of $200 played five club (4–1 record) games that season. In 1959, the school took the sport to the intercollegiate level. The move paid off as the Billikens won the inaugural NCAA Division I championship. Guelker continued to coach St. Louis through the 1966 season, taking the team to a 95–10–5 record and winning five championships (1959, 1960, 1962, 1963, 1965). The Billikens also finished as runners-up in 1961. He was inducted into the St. Louis University Hall of Fame in 1979. On September 30, 2009, Guelker was named to SLU's Half-Century Team.

In 1966, Guelker left SLU and moved to Southern Illinois University Edwardsville (SIUE) to establish the soccer program and serve as the Cougars' athletic director. In 1972, when the NCAA established Division II soccer, Guelker's team won the first NCAA Division II championship. In 1973, he was selected as the NSCAA Coach of the Year. After winning the Division II title, SIUE moved into Division I competition, and Guelker won one last title when the Cougars took the 1979 title 3–2 over the Clemson Tigers. Guelker's role as SIUE's head coach ended with his death in February 1986, after having compiled a 216–67–21 record with SIUE. In 2005, SIUE inducted Guelker into the school's Athletics Hall of Fame.

As a college coach, Guelker achieved a record of 311–77–26 and won seven NCAA titles, including the first in both Division I and Division II. In 1971, Guelker coached the U.S. soccer team at the Pan American Games, and a year later, he coached the U.S. at the 1972 Summer Olympics. He also coached the U.S. Under 19 national team.

== Executive ==
In addition to coaching, Guelker held various executive positions at the local and national levels. In 1946, he became the Executive Secretary for the Catholic Youth Council, Archdiocese of St. Louis, a position he held until 1969. . He was the president of the United States Soccer Football Association from 1967 to 1969. He was also the Chair of the National Junior Cup Competition Committee, USSF Olympic Development Committee, Missouri Soccer Federation, and Missouri Senior Soccer Association.

The Catholic Youth Council of St. Louis holds an annual “Bob Guelker Soccer Tournament” in his honor. He was inducted into the National Soccer Hall of Fame in 1980 and the St. Louis Soccer Hall of Fame in 1986 and the National Soccer Coaches Association of America's Hall of Fame in 1993.

== Coaching record ==
Record table
Season	Team	Overall	Conference	Standing	Postseason
Saint Louis University (Single Division Independent) (1959–1966)
1959	SLU Billikens	11–1–0			NCAA Champions
1960	SLU Billikens	14–1–0			NCAA Champions
1961	SLU Billikens	13–2–0			NCAA Runner-up
1962	SLU Billikens	12–0–1			NCAA Champions
1963	SLU Billikens	13–1–0			NCAA Champions
1964	SLU Billikens	11–1–1			NCAA Semifinals
1965	SLU Billikens	14–0–0			NCAA Champions
1966	SLU Billikens	7–4–3			Lost Elite 8
SLU Billikens:		95–10–5 (.886)			
SIU Edwardsville (Single Division Independent) (1967–1971)
1967	SIUE Cougars	3–3–0			Ineligible-in transition
1968	SIUE Cougars	10–0–0			Ineligible-in transition
1969	SIUE Cougars	10–1–1			Lost 2nd round
1970	SIUE Cougars	9–3–0			Lost Elite 8
1971	SIUE Cougars	10–2–1			Lost Elite 8
SIU Edwardsville (Division II Independent) (1972–Only)
1972	SIUE Cougars	11–0–3			NCAA Div. II Champion
SIU Edwardsville (Division I Independent) (1973–1985)
1973	SIUE Cougars	11–2–1			Lost Elite 8
1974	SIUE Cougars	12–3–0			Lost Elite 8
1975	SIUE Cougars	14–4–0			NCAA Runner-up
1976	SIUE Cougars	12–4–0			Lost Elite 8
1977	SIUE Cougars	12–4–1			3rd Place
1978	SIUE Cougars	14–3–1			Lost Elite 8
1979	SIUE Cougars	19–2–3			NCAA Champion
1980	SIUE Cougars	10–8–2			Lost 1st round
1981	SIUE Cougars	13–4–1			Lost 1st round
1982	SIUE Cougars	15–4–1			3rd Place
1983	SIUE Cougars	10–6–2			
1984	SIUE Cougars	8–7–4			
1985	SIUE Cougars	13–7–0			
SIUE Cougars:		216–67–21 (.745)			
Total:		311–77–26 (.780)			
National champion Postseason invitational champion Conference regular season champion Conference regular season and conference tournament champion Division regular season champion Division regular season and conference tournament champion Conference tournament champion
