= John Carenza =

American soccer player (1950–2023)

Personal information
- Date of birth: January 3, 1950
- Place of birth: St. Louis, Missouri, U.S.
- Date of death: March 17, 2023 (aged 73)
- Height: 6 ft 4 in (1.93 m)
- Positions: Center-back; forward

Youth career
- 1954–1964: Southwest Kiwanis Club
- 1968–1972: SIUE

Senior career*
Years	Team	Apps	(Gls)
1973–1976	St. Louis Stars	52	(5)
- * Club domestic league appearances and goals

John Carenza (January 3, 1950 – March 17, 2023) was an American soccer player who was a member of the U.S. Olympic soccer team. He also spent five seasons in the North American Soccer League.

== College ==
Carenza graduated from St. Mary's High School in St. Louis, Missouri in 1968. He is a member of the school's Hall of Fame. After high school, he attended Southern Illinois University Edwardsville (SIUE) where he played as a forward on the SIUE Cougars men's soccer team from 1968 to 1971. SIUE had established its soccer program in 1967, but Carenza carried the team to national prominence. He still holds the career record for goals with 71 and is second on the career assists list with 29. Carenza earned second team All-American recognition in 1971. He was also a two time runner-up for the Hermann Trophy. Carenza is a member of Who's Who Among Colleges & Universities and was a charter member of the Sigma Pi fraternity chapter at SIUE.

== 1972 Olympic Team ==
His collegiate success led to his selection to the U.S. Olympic soccer team as it began the qualification process for the 1972 Summer Olympics. He quickly made an impact on the team when he scored the U.S. goal in a 1–1 tie with El Salvador on July 18, 1971. He scored again in a 3–1 dismantling of Barbados in August. On January 23, 1972, he scored another significant goal when the U.S. tied Mexico in Mexico. He scored twice more, the last goal coming in the last qualification game, a 2–1 victory over Jamaica which clinched the first U.S. appearance at the Olympics in 1956. The actual games themselves were an anti-climax as the U.S. went 0–2–1. Despite Carenza's success with the Olympic team, he was never selected for the full national team.

== NASL ==
In 1973, the St. Louis Stars of the North American Soccer League (NASL) selected Carenza in the first round of the College Draft. While he had made his reputation as a high-scoring forward, the Stars also used him in defense. He spent four seasons with the Stars, playing in 52 games and scoring 5 goals.

== Personal life and death ==
His father, Joe Carenza, Sr., was a member of the National Soccer Hall of Fame.

John Carenza died on March 17, 2023, at the age of 73.
