= Missouri Valley Conference men's soccer tournament =

- NCAA Tournament Qualifier
- Sport: College soccer
- Conference: Missouri Valley Conference
- Number of teams: 7
- Format: Single-elimination
- Current stadium: Betty & Bobby Allison South Stadium
- Current location: Springfield, Missouri
- Played: 1991–present
- Last contest: 2026
- Current champion: Bowling Green (1st title)
- Most championships: Creighton (13)
- TV partner: ESPN+
- Official website: mvc-sports.com/msoc

The Missouri Valley Conference men's soccer tournament is the conference championship tournament in soccer for the Missouri Valley Conference (MVC). The tournament has been held every year since the MVC began men's soccer competition in 1991. It is a single-elimination tournament and seeding is based on regular season conference records. The winner, declared conference champion, receives the conference's automatic bid to the NCAA Division I men's soccer championship.

Creighton is the most winning team of the competition with 13 titles.

== List of champions ==
=== Finals ===
Key

- (1) – Title number
- a.e.t. – Match went to extra time
- p – Match decided by a penalty shootout after extra time
- – Winning team won regular season

Ed.	Year	Champion	Score	Runner-up	MVP	Stadium	City	Att.	Season Champion	Teams to NCAA Tourney
1	1991	Tulsa (1)	2–1	Illinois State	Frank Velez, Tulsa	Chapman Stadium	Tulsa, OK	1,042	Tulsa	Tulsa
2	1992	Creighton (1)	6–2	Illinois State	Ray Ferri, Creighton	Tranquility Park	Omaha, NE	3,131	Creighton	Creighton
3	1993	Creighton (2)	2–0	Tulsa	Brian Kamler, Creighton	Tranquility Park	Omaha, NE	3,849	Creighton	Creighton
4	1994	Creighton (3)	1–0	Drake	Jay Fitzgerald, Creighton	Tranquility Park	Omaha, NE	2,700	Creighton	Creighton
5	1995	Creighton (4)	2–1	Evansville	Ross Paule, Creighton	McCutchan Stadium	Evansville, IN	1,065	Creighton	Creighton
6	1996	Evansville	3–2 (a.e.t.)	Creighton	Mike LaBerge, Evansville	Tranquility Park	Omaha, NE	2,030	Creighton	Evansville, Creighton
7	1997	Creighton (5)	4–1	Missouri State	Johnny Torres, Creighton	Black Beauty Field	Evansville, IN	750	Missouri State	Creighton; Missouri State
8	1998	Creighton (6)	1–0	Missouri State	Richard Mulrooney, Creighton	Cooper Park	Springfield, MO	3,912	Bradley	Creighton
9	1999	Missouri State (1)	2–1 (a.e.t.)	Bradley	Jarod Bertrand, Missouri St	Chiefs Club Field	Peoria, IL	3,073	Missouri St	Missouri St, Creighton
10	2000	Creighton (7)	2–1 (a.e.t.)	Bradley	Brian Mullan, Creighton	SportPort in	Maryland Heights, MO	2,233	SMU	Creighton, Bradley, SMU
11	2001	SMU (1)	2–1 (a.e.t.)	Creighton	Luchi Gonzalez, SMU	SportPort	Maryland Heights, MO	4,758	SMU	SMU, Creighton
12	2002	Creighton (8)	1–0	Bradley Braves	Mike Tranchilla, Creighton	SportPort	Maryland Heights, MO	3,353	SMU	Creighton, Bradley, SMU
13	2003	SMU (2)	1–1 (4–3 p)	Missouri State	Kevin Hudson, SMU	SportPort	Maryland Heights, MO	4,002	Creighton	SMU, Creighton, Tulsa
14	2004	SMU (3)	2–1	Tulsa	Ugo Ihemelu, SMU	Morrison Stadium	Omaha, NE	7,199	SMU	SMU, Tulsa, Creighton
15	2005	Creighton (9)	2–0	Bradley	Matt Wieland, Creighton	Shea Stadium	Peoria, IL	6,056	Bradley	Creighton, Bradley
16	2006	Creighton (10)	2–1 (a.e.t.)	Bradley	Byron Dacy, Creighton	Shea Stadium	Peoria, IL	3,033	Bradley, Creighton	Creighton
17	2007	Bradley (1)	1–0	Creighton	Teddy Anderson, Bradley	Morrison Stadium	Omaha, NE	6,507	Bradley, Creighton	Bradley, Creighton
18	2008	Creighton (11)	1–0	Missouri State	Andrei Gotsmanov, Creighton	Goebel Soccer Complex	Evansville, IN	1,121	Creighton	Creighton, Drake
19	2009	Drake	2–1	Evansville	Calvin Clark, Drake	Cownie Soccer Park	Des Moines, IA	1,955	Missouri St	Drake, Missouri St
20	2010	Bradley (2)	0–0 (4–3 p)	SIU Edwardsville	Aodhan Quinn, Bradley	Shea Stadium	Peoria, IL	4,185	Creighton	Bradley, Creighton
21	2011	Creighton (12)	1–0	Missouri State	Brian Holt, Creighton	Morrison Stadium	Omaha, NE	6,453	Creighton, Missouri State	Creighton, Bradley
22	2012	Creighton (13)	2–1	SIU Edwardsville	Jose Gomez, Creighton	Shea Stadium	Peoria, IL	1,230	Creighton	Creighton
23	2013	Bradley (3)	1–0	Missouri State	Brian Billings, Bradley	Shea Stadium	Peoria, IL	1,435	Missouri State	Bradley
24	2014	SIU Edwardsville	1–0 (a.e.t.)	Missouri State	Jabari Danzy, SIUE	Shea Stadium	Peoria, IL	1,254	Missouri St	SIUE
25	2015	Drake	1–0	SIU Edwardsville	Kyle Whigham, Drake	Ralph Korte Stadium	Edwardsville, IL	2,481	SIU Edwardsville	Drake
26	2016	SIU Edwardsville	1–0	Missouri State	Austin Ledbetter, SIUE	Allison South Stadium	Springfield, MO	2,168	Loyola Chicago	SIUE, Loyola
27	2017	Central Arkansas (1)	1–0	Missouri State	Niklas Brodacki, Central Arkansas	Shea Stadium	Peoria, IL	127	Missouri St	Cen Arkansas
28	2018	Central Arkansas (2)	2–1	Loyola Chicago	Daltyn Knutson, Cen Arkansas	McCutchan Stadium	Evansville, IN	157	Cen Arkansas	Cen Arkansas
29	2019	Loyola Chicago	1–1 (5–4 p)	Missouri State	Aidean Megally, Loyola Ch	Loyola Soccer Park	Chicago, IL	303	Missouri St	Missouri St, Loyola Ch
30	2020	Missouri State (2)	1–0	Loyola Chicago	Nicolo Mulatero, Missouri State	Allison Stadium	Springfield, MO	643	Missouri St	Missouri St
31	2021	Missouri State (3)	3–0	Evansville	Michael Creek, Missouri State	Allison Stadium	Springfield, MO	270	Missouri St	Missouri St
32	2022	Missouri State (4)	1–0	Evansville	Harry Townsend, Missouri St	Allison Stadium	Springfield, MO	257	Missouri St	Missouri St
33	2023	Western Michigan (1)	2–1	Missouri State	Charlie Sharp, West Michigan	WMU Soccer Complex	Kalamazoo, MI	2,751	West Michigan	West Michigan, Missouri St
34	2024	Evansville (2)	3–2	Bowling Green	Kai Phillips, Evansville	Allison Stadium	Springfield, MO	2,343	Missouri St	Evansville; Missouri State; West. Michigan
35	2025	Western Michigan (2)	1–0	Evansville	Braxton Arpachinda, WM	McCutchan Stadium	Evansville, IN	1,810	Evansville, Drake, Northern Illinois	Western Michigan
36	2026	Bowling Green (1)	1–1 (7–6 p)	Western Michigan	Jason Ball, Bowling Green	Mickey Cochrane Stadium	Bowling Green, OH	1,523	Bowling Green, Evansville	Bowling Green

=== By school ===
As of November 2026

School	Seasons	Titles	Title years	App.	Last	W	L	T	Pct
Belmont	5	0		4	2026	1	6	0	.143
Bowling Green	4	1	2026	3	2026	3	2	1	.583
Bradley	36	3	2007, 2010, 2013	25	2022	23	19	7	.541
Central Arkansas*	8	2	2017, 2018	5	2017	2	3	2	.429
Creighton*	22	13	1992, 1993, 1994, 1995, 1997, 1998, 2000, 2002, 2005, 2006, 2008, 2011, 2012	22	2012	34	8	1	.802
Drake	36	2	2009, 2015	30	2026	16	25	3	.398
Eastern Illinois*	15	0		8	2008	1	7	2	.200
Evansville	36	2	1996, 2024	26	2026	14	22	4	.400
Illinois State^{#}	4	0		4	1994	3	4	0	.429
Loyola*	9	1	2019	9	2021	5	6	3	.464
Missouri State*	34	4	1999, 2020, 2021, 2022	25	2024	24	22	7	.519
Northern Illinois*	3	0		2	2025	1	2	0	.333
SIUE	9	2	2014, 2016	9	2022	7	6	2	.533
SMU*	5	3	2001, 2003, 2004	5	2004	10	2	1	.808
TCU*	1	0		0	–	0	0	0	–
Tulsa*	10	1	1991	8	2004	4	7	1	.375
UIC	5	0		4	2026	3	4	0	.429
Valparaiso#	3	0		3	2019	0	3	0	.000
Vanderbilt*	9	0		7	2005	1	7	1	.167
Western Kentucky*	11	0		5	2003	2	4	1	.357
Western Michigan	4	2	2023, 2025	4	2026	6	1	2	.778

- BF = Current active members
- * = Former Member or Affiliate.
- ^{#} = MVC member, no longer plays soccer.
