= 2013 Missouri Valley Conference men's soccer season =

Missouri Valley Conference
- Season: 2013
- Champions: Missouri State
- MVC Tourney Winner: Bradley
- To NCAA Tournament: Bradley
- Top goalscorer: Wojciech Wojcik; Bradley 5 G, 14 A
- Biggest home win: UCA 3-0 UMKC (September 8); Bradley 3-0 Drake (November 15)
- Biggest away win: EIU 1-4 Loyola (September 13); E'ville 1-4 Drake (October 5); Loyola 2-5 E'ville (October 12)
- Highest scoring: E'ville 5-4 EIU (September 22)
- Longest winning run: 6 — Bradley
- Longest unbeaten run: 7 — Missouri State
- Longest winless run: 10 — Loyola
- Longest losing run: 5 — Loyola & UCA
- Highest attendance: 2375—UCA @ SIUE
- Lowest attendance: 132—E'ville @ UCA

The 2013 Missouri Valley Conference men's soccer season was the 23rd season of men's varsity soccer in the conference. The defending regular and postseason champions, Creighton, left the conference to join the new Big East Conference.

The 2013 Missouri Valley Conference Men's Soccer Tournament was hosted and won by Bradley.

== Changes from 2012 ==
- Creighton left for the Big East Conference.
- Loyola joined The Valley from the Horizon League.

== Teams ==
2013 Missouri Valley Conference men's soccer standings
	Conf.					Overall
Team	W		L		T	W		L		T
Missouri State	5	–	1	–	0	11	–	5	–	2
Drake	3	–	1	–	2	8	–	8	–	4
Bradley ‡	3	–	2	–	1	14	–	7	–	2
SIU Edwardsville	3	–	3	–	0	8	–	9	–	2
Loyola Chicago	2	–	3	–	1	6	–	11	–	2
Evansville	2	–	4	–	0	10	–	8	–	1
Central Arkansas	0	–	4	–	2	4	–	11	–	2
‡ - Tournament champion + - Invited to the NCAA Division I Men's Soccer Championship; Rankings from November 25, 2013 NSCAA

Team	Location	Stadium	Capacity	Head coach	Captain	Uniform supplier
Bradley Braves	Peoria, Illinois	Shea Stadium	3,800	(United States) Jim DeRose	TBA	(United States) Nike
Central Arkansas Bears	Conway, Arkansas	Bill Stephens Track/Soccer Complex	300	(United States) Ross Duncan	TBA	(United States) Nike
Drake Bulldogs	Des Moines, Iowa	Cownie Sports Complex	2,000	(Switzerland) (Canada) Sean Holmes	TBA	(Germany) adidas (DU) (United States) Nike (MVC)
Evansville Purple Aces	Evansville, Indiana	McCutchan Stadium	2,500	(United States) Mike Jacobs	TBA	(United States) Nike
Loyola Ramblers	Chicago, Illinois	Loyola Soccer Park	500	(New Zealand) Neil Jones	TBA	(United States) Nike
Missouri State Bears	Springfield, Missouri	Plaster Sports Complex	16,600	(United States) John Leamy	TBA	(United States) Nike
SIU Edwardsville Cougars	Edwardsville, Illinois	Korte Stadium	4,000	(United States) Kevin Kalish	John Berner	(Germany) adidas (SIUE) (United States) Nike (MVC)

== Season outlook ==
2013 Preseason Coaches' Poll

Rank	Team (1st-place votes)	Points
1	SIUE (1)	40
T2	Evansville (2)	36
T2	Drake (1)	36
4	Bradley (2)	35
5	Missouri State (1)	21
6	Central Arkansas	19
7	Loyola	9

2013 Preseason MVC All-Conference Team

Player	School	Position	Class	Hometown (High school)
Jarred Arde	Drake	Midfield	Junior	Gulfport, Miss. (Gulfport)
John Berner	SIUE	Goalkeeper	Senior	St. Louis, Mo. (St. Mary's)
Addison Eck	Drake	Midfield	Senior	Springfield, Ill. (Sacred Heart Griffin)
James Fawke	Missouri State	Defender	Junior	Cheltenham, England (Bournside School)
Mark Gonzalez	Evansville	Midfield	Sophomore	Toronto, Canada (Robert F. Hall Catholic)
Faik Hajderovic	Evansville	Forward	Soophomore	St. Louis, Mo. (Mehlville)
Patrick Hodges	Evansville	Defender	Junior	Evansville, Ind. (Harrison)
Matt Polster	SIUE	Midfield	Junior	Las Vegas, Nev. (Palo Verde)
Matt Taphorn	Central Arkansas	Defender	Junior	Denver, Colo. (Rangeview)
Christian Volesky	SIUE	Forward	Junior	Henderson, Nev. (Foothill)
Wojciech Wojcik	Bradley	Forward	Senior	Elmwood Park, Ill. (Elmwood Park)

== MVC Tournament ==
Quarterfinals; Wednesday, November 13
4	SIUE	2
5	Loyola	1
3	Bradley	3 (2OT)
6	Evansille	2

Semifinals; Friday, November 15
1	Missouri State	1
4	SIUE	0
3	Bradley	3
2	Drake	0

Final; Sunday, November 17
1	Missouri State	0
3	Bradley	1

== Honors ==
=== 2013 NSCAA/Continental Tire NCAA Division I Men's All-Midwest Region Teams ===
First Team— Midfielder James Fawke, Missouri State; Midfielder Faik Hajderovic, Evansville; Forward Wojciech Wojcik, Bradley

Second Team— Goalkeeper Brian Billings, Bradley; Defender Alec Bartlett, Drake; Forward Mark Anthony Gonzalez, Evansville

Third Team— Goalkeeper Trevor Spangenberg, Missouri State; Defender Grant Bell, Bradley; Midfielder Matt Polster, SIUE; Forward Christian Okeke, Bradley

=== 2013 MVC All-Conference First Team ===
Player	School	Position	Class	Hometown (High school)
John Berner	SIUE	Goalkeeper	Senior	St. Louis, Mo. (St. Mary's)
Trevor Spangenberg	Missouri State	Goalkeeper	Senior	Valparaiso, Ind. (Boone Grove)
Alec Bartlett	Drake	Defender	Sophomore	Overland Park, Kan. (St. James Academy)
James Fawke	Missouri State	Defender	Junior	Cheltenham, England (Bournside School)
Nick Marshall	Drake	Defender	Senior	Glen Carbon, Ill. (Edwardsville)
Faik Hajderovic	Evansville	Forward	Sophomore	St. Louis, Mo. (Mehlville)
Matt Polster	SIUE	Midfield	Junior	Las Vegas, Nev. (Palo Verde)
Jack Roberts	Missouri State	Midfield	Junior	Leceiser, England (John Cleveland College)
Mark Gonzalez	Evansville	Forward	Sophomore	Toronto, Canada (Robert F. Hall Catholic)
Christian Volesky	SIUE	Forward	Junior	Henderson, Nev. (Foothill)
Wojciech Wojcik	Bradley	Forward	Senior	Elmwood Park, Ill. (Elmwood Park)

=== 2013 MVC All-Freshman Team ===
Player	School	Position	Hometown (High school)
Darrin McLeod	Drake	Goalkeeper	Waterloo, Ontario (Resurrection Catholic)
Andrew Kendall-Moulin	SIUE	Defender	Faribault, Minn (Shattuck-St. Mary's)
Austin Ledbetter	SIUE	Defender	St. Charles, Mo. (CBC)
Kirill Likhovid	Loyola	Defender	Arlington Heights, Ill. (Buffalo Grove)
Jack Griffin	Missouri State	Midfield	Beverley, England (Beverley Grammar School)
Ben LeMay	Drake	Midfield	Hugo, Minn. (Saint Thomas Academy)
Landon Souder	Evansville	Midfield	Harrodsburg, Ky. (Mercer County)
Mueng Sunday	Drake	Midfield	Coralville, Iowa (Iowa City West)
Wes Carson	Central Arkansas	Forward	Fort Smith, Ark. (Fort Smith Southside)
Christian Okeke	Bradley	Forward	Wichita Falls, Texas (Rider)
Jared Robinson	Evansville	Forward	Powell, Ohio (Olentangy Liberty)
