= 2018 Missouri Valley Conference men's soccer tournament =

- Classification: Division I
- Teams: 7
- Matches: 6
- Attendance: 664
- Site: Arad McCutchan Stadium; Evansville, Indiana
- Champions: Central Arkansas (2nd title)
- Winning coach: Ross Duncan (2nd title)
- MVP: Daltyn Knutson (Central Arkansas)
- Broadcast: ESPN+

2018 Missouri Valley Conference men's soccer standings
	Conf.					Overall
Team	W		L		T	W		L		T
Central Arkansas ‡	4	–	1	–	1	8	–	6	–	4
Loyola Chicago	3	–	1	–	2	10	–	7	–	2
Valparaiso	2	–	1	–	3	5	–	8	–	4
Missouri State	2	–	2	–	2	9	–	2	–	6
Evansville	2	–	2	–	2	4	–	8	–	7
Drake	2	–	3	–	1	7	–	7	–	3
Bradley	1	–	5	–	0	8	–	5	–	4
‡ – 2018 MVC Tournament champion + – Invited to the 2018 NCAA Division I Men's Soccer Championship; As of November 30, 2018; Rankings from United Soccer Coaches

The 2018 Missouri Valley Conference men's soccer tournament was the 29th edition of the competition. The tournament was played from November 7 until November 11, 2018.

The Central Arkansas Bears won the tournament, defeating Loyola Chicago 2–1 in the final. The win give the UCA their second consecutive MVC men's soccer championship, and a berth into the 2018 NCAA Division I men's soccer tournament.

== Background ==
The 2018 Missouri Valley Conference Men's Soccer Tournament is the culmination of the regular season. The regular season conference matches determine the seeding in the tournament, which determines the conference's automatic berth into the NCAA Tournament. All teams in the Missouri Valley Conference, or MVC, play each other once during the season. Teams play certain teams at home during even number years, and then will play those teams on the road during odd number years. Teams are awarded three points for a win, a point for a draw and no points for a loss.

In the event that teams are tied on points, the first tiebreaker is head-to-head record. If that tiebreaker is tied, goal differential is applied, followed by goals scored, then away goals, then RPI.

Central Arkansas won the regular season with a 4–1–1 record.

== Seeding ==
Seed	School	Conference	Tiebreaker
1	Central Arkansas	4–1–1	
2	Loyola Chicago	3–1–2	
3	Valparaiso	2–1–3	
4	Missouri State	2–2–2	
5	Evansville	2–2–2	
6	Drake	2–3–1	

== Bracket ==
Opening Round; Wednesday, Nov. 7
3	Valparaiso	1
6	Drake	2^{2OT}
4	Missouri State	5
5	Evansville	2

Semifinals; Friday, Nov. 9
2	Loyola Chicago	1^{2OT}
6	Drake	0
1	Central Arkansas	2 (5)
4	Missouri State	2 (4)

Final; Sunday, Nov. 11
2	Loyola Chicago	1
1	Central Arkansas	2

== Results ==
=== Quarterfinals ===
November 7, 2018
3:00 p.m. CDT

No. 3 Valparaiso	1–2 (a.e.t.)	No. 6 Drake
Tyler Curylo 36'	Report	3' Leroy Enzugusi; 104' Steven Enna

Arad McCutchan Stadium, Evansville, Indiana
Attendance: 131
November 7, 2018
6:00 p.m. CDT

No. 4 Missouri State	5–2	No. 5 Evansville
Stuart Wilkin 34'; Greg Stratton 35'; Harry Lewis 43'; Conor Ingram 59'; Josh Dolling 70' (pen.)	Report	1' Hunter Deweese; 23' Ryan Harris

Arad McCutchan Stadium, Evansville, Indiana
Attendance: 219

=== Semifinals ===
November 9, 2018
3:00 p.m. CDT

No. 2 Loyola Chicago	1–0 (a.e.t.)	No. 6 Drake
Aidan Megally 108'	Report

Arad McCutchan Stadium, Evansville, Indiana
Attendance: 157
Referee: Landis Wiley
November 9, 2018
6:00 p.m. CDT

No. 1 Central Arkansas	2–2 (a.e.t.)	No. 4 Missouri State
Niklas Brodacki 43' (pen.); Daltyn Knutson 64'	Report	18' Ben Stroud; 57' Stuart Wilkin
Penalties
Daltyn Knutson (penalty scored); Vicent Abaso (penalty missed); Jake Bates (penalty scored); Niklas Sandquiest (penalty scored); Niklas Brodacki (penalty scored); Soren Jensen (penalty scored)	5–4	(penalty scored) Jake Buckle; (penalty scored) Josh Dolling; (penalty scored) Conor Ingram; (penalty missed) Stuart Wilkin; (penalty scored) Ben Stroud; (penalty missed) Kyle Hiebert

Arad McCutchan Stadium, Evansville, Indiana
Attendance: 157
Referee: Shane Butler

=== MVC Championship ===
November 11, 2018
1:00 p.m. CDT

No. 2 Loyola Chicago	1–2	No. 1 Central Arkansas
Aidan Megally 79' (pen.)	Report	17' Niklas Brodacki; 53' Daltyn Knutson

Arad McCutchan Stadium, Evansville, Indiana
Attendance: 157
Referee: Ben Trevino

== Statistics ==
=== Goalscorers ===
2 Goals

- Niklas Brodacki - Central Arkansas
- Daltyn Knutson - Central Arkansas
- Aidan Megally - Loyola Chicago
- Stuart Wilkin - Missouri State

1 Goal

- Tyler Curylo - Valparaiso
- Hunter Deweese - Evansville
- Josh Dolling - Missouri State
- Steven Enna - Drake
- Leroy Enzugusi - Drake
- Ryan Harris - Evansville
- Conor Ingram - Missouri State
- Harry Lewis - Missouri State
- Greg Stratton - Missouri State
- Ben Stroud - Missouri State

== Honors and awards ==
=== MVC All-Tournament team ===
**MVC Men's Soccer All-Tournament team**

Nacho Miras, Valparaiso
Simon Waever, Evansville
Jared Brown, Drake
Steven Enna, Drake
Jake Buckle, Missouri State
Jake Laird, Missouri State
Grant Stoneman, Loyola
Aidan Megally, Loyola
Tucker Stephenson, Loyola
Niklas Brodacki, Central Arkansas
Marc Olsen, Central Arkansas
Jake Bates, Central Arkansas
**Daltyn Knutson, Central Arkansas**

MVP in Bold

== See also ==
- 2018 Missouri Valley Conference Women's Soccer Tournament
