= 2005 Missouri Valley Conference men's soccer season =

Missouri Valley Conference
- Season: 2005
- Champions: Bradley
- MVC Tourney Winner: Creighton
- To NCAA Tournament: Creighton; Bradley

The 2005 Missouri Valley Conference men's soccer season was the 15th season of men's varsity soccer in the conference.

The 2005 Missouri Valley Conference Men's Soccer Tournament was hosted by Bradley and won by Creighton.

== Teams ==
2005 Missouri Valley Conference men's soccer standings
	Conf.					Overall
Team	W		L		T	W		L		T
Bradley	5	–	1	–	1	15	–	6	–	1
No. 6 Creighton †	5	–	2	–	0	15	–	5	–	3
Vanderbilt	4	–	2	–	1	9	–	7	–	2
Drake	4	–	2	–	1	9	–	9	–	2
Missouri State	4	–	3	–	0	12	–	4	–	2
Eastern Illinois	2	–	4	–	1	5	–	9	–	3
Western Kentucky	2	–	5	–	0	8	–	8	–	1
Evansville	0	–	7	–	0	2	–	14	–	1
† 2005 MVC Tournament winner As of December 13, 2005; Rankings from NSCAA
