= 1997 Missouri Valley Conference men's soccer season =

Missouri Valley Conference
- Season: 1997
- Champions: Missouri State
- MVC Tourney Winner: Creighton
- To NCAA Tournament: Creighton; Missouri State

The 1997 Missouri Valley Conference men's soccer season was the 7th season of men's varsity soccer in the conference.

The 1997 Missouri Valley Conference Men's Soccer Tournament was hosted by Evansville and won by Creighton.

== Teams ==
1997 Missouri Valley Conference men's soccer standings
	Conf.					Overall
Team	W		L		T	W		L		T
No. 23 Missouri State	6	–	0	–	1	13	–	5	–	3
No. 10 Creighton †	6	–	1	–	0	16	–	5	–	1
Evansville	4	–	3	–	0	9	–	10	–	1
Vanderbilt	2	–	2	–	3	9	–	8	–	3
Eastern Illinois	3	–	4	–	0	4	–	15	–	0
Drake	2	–	4	–	1	8	–	10	–	1
Western Kentucky	1	–	5	–	1	5	–	13	–	1
Bradley	1	–	6	–	0	11	–	8	–	0
† 1997 MVC Tournament winner As of December 16, 1997; Rankings from NSCAA
