= 2003 Missouri Valley Conference men's soccer season =

Missouri Valley Conference
- Season: 2003
- Champions: Creighton
- MVC Tourney Winner: SMU
- To NCAA Tournament: SMU; Creighton; Tulsa

The 2003 Missouri Valley Conference men's soccer season was the 13th season of men's varsity soccer in the conference.

The 2003 Missouri Valley Conference Men's Soccer Tournament was hosted by the Missouri Valley Conference and won by SMU.

== Teams ==
2003 Missouri Valley Conference men's soccer standings
	Conf.					Overall
Team	W		L		T	W		L		T
No. 8 Creighton	7	–	1	–	1	12	–	6	–	4
Tulsa	6	–	1	–	2	13	–	6	–	2
Western Kentucky	6	–	3	–	0	10	–	9	–	1
Bradley	5	–	2	–	2	11	–	8	–	4
Drake	4	–	3	–	2	10	–	6	–	3
Evansville	4	–	4	–	1	9	–	7	–	3
No. 23 SMU †	4	–	5	–	0	13	–	6	–	3
Missouri State	3	–	5	–	1	9	–	7	–	3
Vanderbilt	0	–	7	–	2	3	–	10	–	5
Eastern Illinois	0	–	8	–	1	15	–	12	–	2
† 2003 MVC Tournament winner As of December 9, 2003; Rankings from NSCAA
