= 1998 Missouri Valley Conference men's soccer season =

Missouri Valley Conference
- Season: 1998
- Champions: Bradley
- MVC Tourney Winner: Creighton
- To NCAA Tournament: Creighton

The 1998 Missouri Valley Conference men's soccer season was the 8th season of men's varsity soccer in the conference.

The 1998 Missouri Valley Conference Men's Soccer Tournament was hosted by Missouri State and won by Creighton.

== Teams ==
1998 Missouri Valley Conference men's soccer standings
	Conf.					Overall
Team	W		L		T	W		L		T
Bradley	6	–	1	–	0	14	–	2	–	2
No. 7 Creighton †	4	–	1	–	2	16	–	4	–	2
Western Kentucky	4	–	3	–	0	12	–	8	–	1
Missouri State	3	–	3	–	1	13	–	7	–	1
Vanderbilt	3	–	3	–	1	11	–	8	–	1
Eastern Illinois	2	–	4	–	1	12	–	5	–	3
Evansville	2	–	5	–	0	6	–	14	–	0
Drake	1	–	5	–	1	6	–	11	–	1
† 1998 MVC Tournament winner As of December 15, 1998; Rankings from NSCAA
