= 2021 Missouri Valley Conference men's soccer tournament =

- Classification: Division I
- Teams: 6
- Matches: 5
- Attendance: 1,057
- Site: Betty & Bobby Allison South Stadium (Semifinals & Final); Springfield, Missouri
- Champions: Missouri State (3rd title)
- Winning coach: Michael Seabolt (2nd title)
- MVP: Michael Creek (Missouri State)
- Broadcast: ESPN+

2021 Missouri Valley Conference men's soccer standings
	Conf.					Overall
Team	W		L		T	W		L		T
No. 22 Missouri State ‡	10	–	0	–	0	17	–	2	–	0
Loyola Chicago	6	–	3	–	1	9	–	5	–	2
SIU Edwardsville	4	–	6	–	0	6	–	10	–	2
Evansville	3	–	6	–	1	4	–	14	–	2
Drake	3	–	7	–	0	6	–	9	–	0
Bradley	3	–	7	–	0	5	–	12	–	1
‡ – 2021 MVC Tournament champion + – At-large invitation to the 2021 NCAA tournament; As of December 14, 2021; Rankings from United Soccer Coaches; Source: MVC

The 2021 Missouri Valley Conference men's soccer tournament was the postseason men's soccer tournament for the Missouri Valley Conference held from November 9 through November 14, 2021. The First Round was held at campus sites. The semifinals and finals took place at Betty & Bobby Allison South Stadium in Springfield, Missouri. The six-team single-elimination tournament consisted of three rounds based on seeding from regular season conference play. The defending champions were the Missouri State Bears, who successfully defended their title by defeating Evansville 3–0 in the final. The conference tournament title was the third for the Missouri State men's soccer program, and second for head coach Michael Seabolt. As tournament champions, Missouri State earned the Missouri Valley's automatic berth into the 2021 NCAA Division I men's soccer tournament.

== Seeding ==
All six Missouri Valley Conference men's soccer programs qualified for the 2021 Tournament. Teams were seeded based on their regular season records. Tiebreakers were used to determine the seedings of teams who finished with identical conference records. One tiebreaker was required to determine the fifth and sixth seeds as Drake and Bradley both finished the regular season with a record of 3–7–0. Drake earned the 5th seed by virtue of defeating Bradley 2–1 both times the teams met during the regular season.

Seed	School	Conference Record	Points
1	Missouri State	10–0–0	30
2	Loyola Chicago	6–3–1	19
3	SIU Edwardsville	4–6–0	12
4	Evansville	3–6–1	10
5	Drake	3–7–0	9
6	Bradley	3–7–0	9

== Bracket ==
Quarterfinals; Wednesday, Nov. 9
4	Evansville	4
5	Drake	2
3	SIU Edwardsville	1
6	Bradley	2

Semifinals; Saturday, Nov. 12
1	Missouri State	1
6	Bradley	0
2	Loyola Chicago	2 (7)
4	Evansville (pen.)	2 (8)

Final; Sunday, Nov. 14
1	Missouri State	3
4	Evansville	0

== Schedule ==
=== Opening Round ===
November 9, 2021	#4 Evansville	4–2	#5 Drake	Evansville, IN
12:00 p.m. CT	Edward Mendy 41', (yellow card) 41'; Drake 55' (o.g.); Nkosi Graham 64', 72'	Report	(red card) 23' Absalom Solorio-Villalpando; 30', 83' Juan Louis	Stadium: Arad McCutchan Stadium; Attendance: 345

November 9, 2021	#3 SIU Edwardsville	1–2	#6 Bradley	Edwardsville, IL
7:00 p.m. CT	Alex Pontoni (yellow card) 52'; Harvey Moyes 56', (yellow card) 86'; Max Broughton (yellow card) 89'; Vincent Jackson II (yellow card) 90'	Report	(yellow card) 52' Michael Rogalski; 54' Danny Collins; 73' Rasmus Smidtslund; (yellow card) 90' Jake Schoffstall	Stadium: Korte Stadium; Attendance: 142; Referee: Calin Radosav; Assistant referees: Adam Herges; Quinton McFarlen; Fourth official: Velimir Milovic

=== Semifinals ===
November 12, 2021	#2 Loyola Chicago	2–2 (a.e.t.) (7–8 p)	#4 Evansville	Springfield, Missouri
3:00 p.m. CT	Andrew Mitchell 20'; Alex Moskal 37'	Report	6' (pen.) Pablo Guillen; 40' Carlos Barcia; (yellow card) 58' Nkosi Graham; (yellow card) 88' Brian Zambrano; (yellow card) 95' Jon Varela	Stadium: Betty & Bobby Allison South Stadium; Attendance: 75; Referee: Alex Beehler; Assistant referees: Vitali Hantsevich; Besnik i Rexhep; Fourth official: Andrew Ellsworth
	Penalties
	Marc Torrellas (penalty scored); Billy Hency (penalty scored); Tomas Dias (penalty scored); Tyler Biggs (penalty scored); Jason Ybarra (penalty scored); Oscar Dueso (penalty scored); Andrew Mitchell (penalty scored); Andrew Schweinert (penalty missed)		(penalty scored) Oliver Hald; (penalty scored) Jakub Hall; (penalty scored) Jose Vivas; (penalty scored) Pablo Guillen; (penalty scored) Francesco Brunetti; (penalty scored) Carlos Barcia; (penalty scored) Brian Zambrano; (penalty scored) Davis Peck

November 12, 2021	#1 Missouri State	1–0	#6 Bradley	Springfield, Missouri
6:00 p.m. CT	Josh Dolling 33'	Report	(yellow card) 29' Jack Douglas	Stadium: Betty & Bobby Allison South Stadium; Attendance: 225; Referee: Heber Estrada; Assistant referees: Zachary Richter; Kurt Wuebbels; Fourth official: Andrew Ellsworth

=== Final ===
November 14, 2021	#1 Missouri State	3–0	#4 Evansville	Springfield, Missouri
1:00 p.m. CT	Javier Martin Gil 29'; Jon Koka 39'; Jesus Barea 53'; Nicolo Mulatero (yellow card) 56'	Report	(yellow card) 52' Owen Butcher	Stadium: Betty & Bobby Allison South Stadium; Attendance: 270; Referee: Art Arustamyan; Assistant referees: Eulogio Villalpando; Khalaf Al-Latayfeh; Fourth official: Daniel Ortega

== Statistics ==
=== Goalscorers ===
There were 17 goals scored in 5 matches, for an average of 3.4 goals per match (as of November 14, 2021).

2 goals

- Juan Louis – Drake
- Nkosi Graham – Evansville

1 goal

- Danny Collins – Bradley
- Rasmus Smidtslund – Bradley
- Carlos Barcia – Evansville
- Pablo Guillen – Evansville
- Edward Mendy – Evansville
- Alex Moskal – Loyola Chicago
- Andrew Mitchell – Loyola Chicago
- Jesus Barea – Missouri State
- Josh Dolling – Missouri State
- Javier Martin Gil – Missouri State
- Jon Koka – Missouri State
- Harvey Moyes – SIU Edwardsville

1 own goal

- Drake (vs. Evansville)

== All-Tournament team ==
Player	Team
Juan Louis	Drake
Harvey Moyes	SIUE
Giann Magno	Loyola-Chicago
Tyler Biggs	Loyola-Chicago
Bryce Logan	Bradley
Michael Rogalski	Bradley
Jacob Madden	Evansville
Nkosi Graham
Ethan Garvey
Connor Langan	Missouri State
Josh Dolling	Missouri State
Kyle Hiebert	Missouri State
**Michael Creek**	Missouri State

MVP in bold
