= 2007 Missouri Valley Conference men's soccer season =

Missouri Valley Conference
- Season: 2007
- Champions: Creighton
- MVC Tourney Winner: Bradley
- To NCAA Tournament: Bradley; Creighton

The 2007 Missouri Valley Conference men's soccer season was the 17th season of men's varsity soccer in the conference.

The 2007 Missouri Valley Conference Men's Soccer Tournament was hosted by Creighton and won by Bradley.

== Teams ==
2007 Missouri Valley Conference men's soccer standings
	Conf.					Overall
Team	W		L		T	W		L		T
No. 9 Creighton	4	–	0	–	2	12	–	3	–	5
No. 10 Bradley †	4	–	0	–	2	16	–	6	–	4
Evansville	3	–	3	–	0	10	–	9	–	1
Drake	2	–	2	–	2	9	–	6	–	4
Eastern Illinois	2	–	3	–	1	12	–	6	–	3
Missouri State	1	–	3	–	2	6	–	10	–	4
Western Kentucky	0	–	5	–	1	3	–	12	–	4
† 2007 MVC Tournament winner As of December 11, 2007; Rankings from NSCAA
