= 1999 Missouri Valley Conference men's soccer season =

Missouri Valley Conference
- Season: 1999
- Champions: Missouri State
- MVC Tourney Winner: Missouri State
- To NCAA Tournament: Missouri State; Creighton

The 1999 Missouri Valley Conference men's soccer season was the 9th season of men's varsity soccer in the conference.

The 1999 Missouri Valley Conference Men's Soccer Tournament was hosted by Bradley and won by Missouri State.

== Teams ==
1999 Missouri Valley Conference men's soccer standings
	Conf.					Overall
Team	W		L		T	W		L		T
No. 13 Missouri State †	5	–	0	–	2	17	–	1	–	3
No. 21 Creighton	5	–	1	–	1	11	–	5	–	2
Western Kentucky	4	–	3	–	0	14	–	5	–	0
Vanderbilt	4	–	3	–	0	10	–	9	–	0
Evansville	3	–	3	–	1	10	–	9	–	1
Bradley	3	–	4	–	0	10	–	10	–	0
Drake	1	–	5	–	1	4	–	13	–	1
Eastern Illinois	0	–	6	–	1	6	–	11	–	1
† 1999 MVC Tournament winner As of December 14, 1999; Rankings from NSCAA
