= 2001 Missouri Valley Conference men's soccer season =

Missouri Valley Conference
- Season: 2001
- Champions: SMU
- MVC Tourney Winner: SMU
- To NCAA Tournament: SMU; Creighton

The 2001 Missouri Valley Conference men's soccer season was the 11th season of men's varsity soccer in the conference.

The 2001 Missouri Valley Conference Men's Soccer Tournament was hosted by the Missouri Valley Conference and won by SMU.

== Teams ==
2001 Missouri Valley Conference men's soccer standings
	Conf.					Overall
Team	W		L		T	W		L		T
No. 5 SMU †	9	–	0	–	0	21	–	1	–	0
Missouri State	7	–	2	–	0	10	–	9	–	1
Creighton	6	–	3	–	0	11	–	9	–	1
Bradley	6	–	3	–	0	12	–	7	–	1
Tulsa	4	–	5	–	0	10	–	9	–	0
Evansville	4	–	5	–	0	7	–	10	–	1
Western Kentucky	3	–	6	–	0	7	–	10	–	0
Vanderbilt	3	–	6	–	0	6	–	10	–	1
Eastern Illinois	2	–	7	–	0	6	–	10	–	0
Drake	1	–	8	–	0	6	–	10	–	1
† 2001 MVC Tournament winner As of December 18, 2001; Rankings from NSCAA
