= 2006 Missouri Valley Conference men's soccer season =

Missouri Valley Conference
- Season: 2006
- Champions: Bradley
- MVC Tourney Winner: Creighton
- To NCAA Tournament: Creighton

The 2006 Missouri Valley Conference men's soccer season was the 16th season of men's varsity soccer in the conference.

The 2006 Missouri Valley Conference Men's Soccer Tournament was hosted by Bradley and won by Creighton.

== Teams ==
2006 Missouri Valley Conference men's soccer standings
| | Conf. | | | | | Overall |
| Team | W | | L | | T | W | | L | | T |
|---|---|---|---|---|---|---|---|---|---|---|
| Bradley | 4 | – | 1 | – | 1 | 8 | – | 8 | – | 4 |
| Creighton † | 4 | – | 1 | – | 1 | 13 | – | 5 | – | 3 |
| Missouri State | 3 | – | 2 | – | 1 | 8 | – | 8 | – | 3 |
| Drake | 2 | – | 1 | – | 3 | 6 | – | 7 | – | 6 |
| Evansville | 2 | – | 4 | – | 0 | 9 | – | 8 | – | 0 |
| Eastern Illinois | 1 | – | 3 | – | 2 | 11 | – | 7 | – | 2 |
| Western Kentucky | 0 | – | 4 | – | 2 | 4 | – | 9 | – | 3 |
† 2006 MVC Tournament winner As of December 5, 2006; Rankings from NSCAA
