= 2000 Missouri Valley Conference men's soccer season =

Missouri Valley Conference
- Season: 2000
- Champions: SMU
- MVC Tourney Winner: Creighton
- To NCAA Tournament: Creighton; Bradley; SMU

The 2000 Missouri Valley Conference men's soccer season was the 10th season of men's varsity soccer in the conference.

The 2000 Missouri Valley Conference Men's Soccer Tournament was hosted by the Missouri Valley Conference and won by Creighton.

== Teams ==
2000 Missouri Valley Conference men's soccer standings
	Conf.					Overall
Team	W		L		T	W		L		T
No. 3 SMU	10	–	1	–	0	20	–	5	–	0
No. 2 Creighton †	9	–	2	–	0	20	–	4	–	0
Western Kentucky	7	–	4	–	0	10	–	11	–	0
Bradley	6	–	4	–	1	15	–	7	–	2
Eastern Illinois	6	–	5	–	0	12	–	6	–	1
Vanderbilt	6	–	5	–	0	9	–	11	–	0
Tulsa	5	–	4	–	2	10	–	7	–	2
Missouri State	4	–	5	–	1	9	–	7	–	3
Drake	4	–	7	–	0	7	–	12	–	0
Evansville	3	–	7	–	1	4	–	10	–	3
TCU	3	–	8	–	0	7	–	11	–	0
Belmont	0	–	11	–	0	1	–	17	–	0
† 2000 MVC Tournament winner As of December 12, 2000; Rankings from NSCAA
