= 2004 Missouri Valley Conference men's soccer season =

Missouri Valley Conference
- Season: 2004
- Champions: SMU
- MVC Tourney Winner: SMU
- To NCAA Tournament: SMU; Tulsa; Creighton

The 2004 Missouri Valley Conference men's soccer season was the 14th season of men's varsity soccer in the conference.

The 2004 Missouri Valley Conference Men's Soccer Tournament was hosted by Creighton and won by SMU.

== Teams ==
2004 Missouri Valley Conference men's soccer standings
| | Conf. | | | | | Overall |
| Team | W | | L | | T | W | | L | | T |
|---|---|---|---|---|---|---|---|---|---|---|
| No. 11 SMU † | 8 | – | 0 | – | 0 | 16 | – | 4 | – | 1 |
| No. 13 Creighton | 6 | – | 3 | – | 0 | 14 | – | 4 | – | 2 |
| Bradley | 5 | – | 2 | – | 1 | 10 | – | 6 | – | 3 |
| No. 8 Tulsa | 5 | – | 3 | – | 1 | 12 | – | 7 | – | 4 |
| Missouri State | 4 | – | 4 | – | 1 | 11 | – | 6 | – | 2 |
| Drake | 4 | – | 4 | – | 1 | 8 | – | 9 | – | 1 |
| Evansville | 4 | – | 5 | – | 0 | 6 | – | 13 | – | 1 |
| Vanderbilt | 3 | – | 6 | – | 0 | 7 | – | 10 | – | 1 |
| Western Kentucky | 1 | – | 7 | – | 1 | 5 | – | 11 | – | 1 |
| Eastern Illinois | 1 | – | 7 | – | 1 | 5 | – | 12 | – | 1 |
† 2004 MVC Tournament winner As of December 14, 2004; Rankings from NSCAA
