= 2002 Missouri Valley Conference men's soccer season =

Missouri Valley Conference
- Season: 2002
- Champions: SMU
- MVC Tourney Winner: Creighton
- To NCAA Tournament: Creighton; Bradley; SMU

The 2002 Missouri Valley Conference men's soccer season was the 12th season of men's varsity soccer in the conference.

The 2002 Missouri Valley Conference Men's Soccer Tournament was hosted by the Missouri Valley Conference and won by Creighton.

== Teams ==
2002 Missouri Valley Conference men's soccer standings
	Conf.					Overall
Team	W		L		T	W		L		T
No. 12 SMU	7	–	0	–	2	16	–	3	–	3
No. 4 Creighton †	7	–	1	–	1	18	–	4	–	2
Missouri State	6	–	3	–	0	9	–	11	–	0
Drake	5	–	2	–	2	9	–	7	–	2
Bradley	4	–	3	–	2	14	–	6	–	4
Tulsa	4	–	5	–	0	10	–	9	–	0
Eastern Illinois	3	–	5	–	1	8	–	11	–	1
Evansville	2	–	7	–	0	7	–	11	–	2
Western Kentucky	2	–	7	–	0	8	–	10	–	1
Vanderbilt	1	–	5	–	0	3	–	15	–	0
† 2002 MVC Tournament winner As of December 17, 2002; Rankings from NSCAA
