= 2008 Missouri Valley Conference men's soccer season =

Missouri Valley Conference
- Season: 2008
- Champions: Creighton
- MVC Tourney Winner: Creighton
- To NCAA Tournament: Creighton; Drake

The 2008 Missouri Valley Conference men's soccer season was the 18th season of men's varsity soccer in the conference.

The 2008 Missouri Valley Conference Men's Soccer Tournament was hosted by Evansville and won by Creighton.

== Teams ==
2008 Missouri Valley Conference men's soccer standings
	Conf.					Overall
Team	W		L		T	W		L		T
No. 5 Creighton †	4	–	0	–	1	16	–	2	–	2
Drake	4	–	1	–	0	13	–	5	–	1
Missouri State	3	–	1	–	1	7	–	10	–	5
Evansville	2	–	3	–	0	9	–	7	–	2
Bradley	1	–	4	–	0	6	–	12	–	2
Eastern Illinois	0	–	5	–	0	5	–	11	–	3
† 2008 MVC Tournament winner As of December 16, 2008; Rankings from NSCAA
