= 2010 Missouri Valley Conference men's soccer season =

Missouri Valley Conference
- Season: 2010
- Champions: Creighton
- MVC Tourney Winner: Bradley
- To NCAA Tournament: Bradley; Creighton

The 2010 Missouri Valley Conference men's soccer season was the 20th season of men's varsity soccer in the conference.

The 2010 Missouri Valley Conference Men's Soccer Tournament was hosted and won by Bradley.

== Teams ==
2010 Missouri Valley Conference men's soccer standings
	Conf.					Overall
Team	W		L		T	W		L		T
No. 14 Creighton	5	–	1	–	1	13	–	5	–	2
SIU Edwardsville	4	–	1	–	2	10	–	5	–	4
Missouri State	4	–	1	–	2	8	–	7	–	3
Drake	4	–	2	–	1	8	–	8	–	2
Bradley †	3	–	3	–	1	11	–	9	–	3
Evansville	3	–	4	–	0	7	–	10	–	1
Eastern Illinois	1	–	5	–	1	4	–	12	–	1
Central Arkansas	0	–	7	–	0	3	–	13	–	0
† 2010 MVC Tournament winner As of December 14, 2010; Rankings from NSCAA
