= 2011 Missouri Valley Conference men's soccer season =

Missouri Valley Conference
- Season: 2011
- Champions: Missouri State
- MVC Tourney Winner: Creighton
- To NCAA Tournament: Creighton; Bradley

The 2011 Missouri Valley Conference men's soccer season was the 21st season of men's varsity soccer in the conference.

The 2011 Missouri Valley Conference Men's Soccer Tournament was hosted and won by Creighton.

== Teams ==
2011 Missouri Valley Conference men's soccer standings
	Conf.					Overall
Team	W		L		T	W		L		T
Missouri State	5	–	1	–	0	9	–	8	–	2
No. 4 Creighton †	5	–	1	–	0	21	–	2	–	1
No. 25 Bradley	4	–	2	–	0	15	–	6	–	2
Drake	3	–	3	–	0	11	–	8	–	1
Central Arkansas	1	–	3	–	2	2	–	12	–	4
SIU Edwardsville	1	–	4	–	1	8	–	8	–	4
Evansville	0	–	5	–	1	5	–	11	–	1
As of December 13, 2011; Rankings from NSCAA
