= 2012 Missouri Valley Conference men's soccer season =

Missouri Valley Conference
- Season: 2012
- Champions: Creighton
- MVC Tourney Winner: Creighton
- To NCAA Tournament: Creighton

The 2012 Missouri Valley Conference men's soccer season was the 22nd season of men's varsity soccer in the conference.

The 2012 Missouri Valley Conference Men's Soccer Tournament was hosted by Bradley and won by Creighton.

== Teams ==
2012 Missouri Valley Conference men's soccer standings
	Conf.					Overall
Team	W		L		T	W		L		T
No. 4 Creighton†	5	–	0	–	1	16	–	4	–	2
SIU Edwardsville	4	–	2	–	0	13	–	7	–	0
Bradley	3	–	2	–	1	10	–	6	–	4
Evansville	3	–	2	–	1	9	–	8	–	1
Drake	2	–	2	–	2	6	–	11	–	4
Central Arkansas	1	–	4	–	1	8	–	9	–	1
Missouri State	0	–	6	–	0	5	–	8	–	4
As of December 11, 2012; Rankings from NSCAA
