= 1996 Missouri Valley Conference men's soccer season =

Missouri Valley Conference
- Season: 1996
- Champions: Creighton
- MVC Tourney Winner: Evansville
- To NCAA Tournament: Evansville; Creighton

The 1996 Missouri Valley Conference men's soccer season was the 6th season of men's varsity soccer in the conference.

The 1996 Missouri Valley Conference Men's Soccer Tournament was hosted by Creighton and won by Evansville.

== Teams ==
1996 Missouri Valley Conference men's soccer standings
	Conf.					Overall
Team	W		L		T	W		L		T
No. 3 Creighton	5	–	0	–	0	17	–	5	–	2
No. 25 Evansville †	4	–	1	–	0	18	–	5	–	0
Missouri State	3	–	2	–	0	12	–	6	–	0
Drake	2	–	3	–	0	6	–	11	–	0
Eastern Illinois	1	–	4	–	0	8	–	11	–	0
Bradley	0	–	5	–	0	7	–	11	–	0
† 1996 MVC Tournament winner As of December 17, 1996; Rankings from NSCAA
