= 2022 Missouri Valley Conference men's soccer tournament =

- Classification: Division I
- Teams: 7
- Matches: 6
- Attendance: 1,910
- Site: Betty & Bobby Allison South Stadium (Semifinals & Final); Springfield, Missouri
- Champions: Missouri State (4rd title)
- Winning coach: Michael Seabolt (3rd title)
- MVP: Harry Townsend (Missouri State)
- Broadcast: ESPN+

2022 Missouri Valley Conference men's soccer standings
	Conf.					Overall
Team	W		L		T	W		L		T
Missouri State‡	6	–	0	–	2	12	–	2	–	4
Drake	5	–	2	–	1	7	–	4	–	4
Evansville	3	–	2	–	3	8	–	5	–	6
Belmont	2	–	2	–	4	7	–	4	–	7
UIC	3	–	4	–	1	5	–	9	–	2
SIU Edwardsville	2	–	6	–	0	5	–	9	–	2
Bradley	1	–	6	–	1	5	–	11	–	3
‡ – 2022 MVC Tournament champion + – At-large invitation to the 2022 NCAA tournament; As of December 13, 2022; Rankings from United Soccer Coaches; Source: MVC

The 2022 Missouri Valley Conference men's soccer tournament was the postseason men's soccer tournament for the Missouri Valley Conference held from November 6 through November 13, 2022. The First Round was held at campus sites. The semifinals and finals took place at Betty & Bobby Allison South Stadium in Springfield, Missouri. The seven-team single-elimination tournament consisted of three rounds based on seeding from regular season conference play. The defending champions were the Missouri State Bears, who successfully defended their title by defeating Evansville 1–0 in the final. This was the second straight year that Missouri State and Evansville played in the title game. The conference tournament title was the fourth, and third in a row for the Missouri State men's soccer program, and third for head coach Michael Seabolt. As tournament champions, Missouri State earned the Missouri Valley's automatic berth into the 2022 NCAA Division I men's soccer tournament.

== Seeding ==
All seven Missouri Valley Conference men's soccer programs qualified for the 2022 Tournament. Teams were seeded based on regular season conference record and tiebreakers were used to determine seedings of teams that finished with the same record. A tiebreaker was required to determine the fourth and fifth seeds in the tournament as UIC and Belmont both finished the season with 10 points in regular season play. The teams drew 3–3 during their regular season match-up, so goal differential in league play was used as the second tiebreaker. UIC earned the fourth seed as they finished with a +2 goal difference while Belmont was the fifth seed after finishing with a -2 goal difference.

Seed	School	Conference Record	Points
1	Missouri State	6–0–2	20
2	Drake	5–2–1	16
3	Evansville	3–2–3	12
4	UIC	3–4–1	10
5	Belmont	2–2–4	10
6	SIU Edwardsville	2–6–0	6
7	Bradley	1–6–1	4

== Bracket ==
Teams were re-seeded after the first round.

Quarterfinals; Sunday, Nov. 6
2	Drake	1
7	Bradley	2
3	Evansville	1
6	SIU Edwardsville	0
4	UIC	0
5	Belmont	1

Semifinals; Thursday, Nov. 10
1	Missouri State	2
7	Bradley	0
3	Evansville	1
5	Belmont	0

Final; Sunday, Nov. 13
1	Missouri State	1
3	Evansville	0

== Schedule ==
=== Quarterfinals ===
November 6	#2 Drake	1–2	#7 Bradley	Des Moines, IA
12:00 p.m. CT	Declan Watters (yellow card) 21'; Leroy Enzugusi 80', (yellow card) 87'; AJ Franklin (yellow card) 83'; Bradan Allen (yellow card) 87'	Report	50' Jack Douglas; 62' Anthony Calleri; (yellow card) 78' Jared Sinnaeve; (yellow card) 79' Pepe Mellado; (yellow card) 85' Kaloyan Somov	Stadium: Cownie Sports Complex; Attendance: 216; Referee: Dimitar Chavdarov; Assistant referees: Jacob Larson; Tyler Turner; Fourth official: Haris Mujic

November 6	#4 UIC	0–1	#5 Belmont	Chicago, IL
1:00 p.m. CT	Manny Cerritos (yellow card) 67'	Report	16' Ayden von Essen; (yellow card) 37' Kyle Barks; (yellow card) 45' (yellow-red card) 54' Esteban Leiva	Stadium: Flames Field; Attendance: 211; Referee: Nicholas Balcer; Assistant referees: Jason White; Justin Tatsak; Fourth official: Michael Kennedy

November 6	#3 Evansville	1–0	#6 SIU Edwardsville	Evansville, IN
2:00 p.m. CT	Team (yellow card) 22'; Ola Arntsen (yellow card) 39'; Ethan Garvey (yellow card) 75'; Jose Vivas 75'	Report	(yellow card) 24' Ignacio Abeal Pou; (yellow card) 68' Owen Hardy; (yellow card) 81' Max Broughton	Stadium: Arad McCutchan Stadium; Attendance: 702

=== Semifinals ===
November 10	#3 Evansville	1–0	#5 Belmont	Springfield, MO
3:00 p.m. CT	Ola Arntsen 65'; Evan Dekker (yellow card) 79'; Jose Vivas (yellow card) 80'	Report	(yellow card) 77' Riley Clothier; (yellow card) 87' Jansen Wilson	Stadium: Betty & Bobby Allison South Stadium; Attendance: 137; Referee: Andrew Ellsworth; Assistant referees: Shane Kennard; Shane Cowger; Fourth official: Tim Wagner

November 10	#1 Missouri State	2–0	#7 Bradley	Springfield, MO
6:00 p.m. CT	Kian Yari 31'; Jon Koka 71'	Report		Stadium: Betty & Bobby Allison South Stadium; Attendance: 387; Referee: Calin Radosav; Assistant referees: Daniel Ortega; Misael Cordero; Fourth official: Dion Webb

=== Final ===
November 13	#1 Missouri State	1–0	#3 Evansville	Springfield, MO
1:00 p.m. CT	Jesus Barea (yellow card) 37'; James Jennings 59'; Jack Denton (yellow card) 72'; Michael Peck (yellow card) 83'	Report	(yellow card) 37' Jose Vivas; (yellow card) 56' Carlos Barcia	Stadium: Betty & Bobby Allison South Stadium; Attendance: 257; Referee: Nikola Aleksic; Assistant referees: Daniel Ortega; Tim Wagner; Fourth official: Andrew Ellsworth

== Statistics ==
=== Goalscorers ===
There were 9 goals scored in 6 matches, for an average of 1.5 goals per match (as of November 13, 2022).

1 goal

- Ayden Von Essen – Belmont
- Anthony Calleri – Bradley
- Jack Douglas – Bradley
- Leroy Enzugusi – Drake
- Ola Arnsten – Evansville
- Jose Vivas – Evansville
- James Jennings – Missouri State
- Jon Koka – Missouri State
- Kian Yari – Missouri State

== All-Tournament team ==
Player	Team
Damian Segura	Drake
Oskar Lenz	SIU Edwardsville
Paul Brauckmann	UIC
Jackson Fyda	Bradley
Erik Catus	Bradley
Dylan Steely	Belmont
Michael Saunders	Belmont
Ethan Garvey	Evansville
Jose Vivas	Evansville
Ola Arntsen	Evansville
Lewis Green	Missouri State
Michael Peck	Missouri State
James Jennings	Missouri State
**Harry Townsend**	Missouri State

MVP in bold
