= 1995 Missouri Valley Conference men's soccer season =

Missouri Valley Conference
- Season: 1995
- Champions: Creighton
- MVC Tourney Winner: Creighton
- To NCAA Tournament: Creighton

The 1995 Missouri Valley Conference men's soccer season was the 5th season of men's varsity soccer in the conference.

The 1995 Missouri Valley Conference Men's Soccer Tournament was hosted by Evansville and won by Creighton.

== Teams ==
1995 Missouri Valley Conference men's soccer standings
	Conf.					Overall
Team	W		L		T	W		L		T
No. 10 Creighton †	4	–	0	–	1	14	–	3	–	1
Evansville	4	–	1	–	0	10	–	7	–	3
Tulsa	2	–	2	–	1	7	–	8	–	2
Missouri State	2	–	3	–	0	14	–	5	–	0
Drake	1	–	3	–	1	8	–	5	–	3
Bradley	0	–	4	–	1	3	–	11	–	4
† 1995 MVC Tournament winner As of December 12, 1995; Rankings from NSCAA
