= 2009 Missouri Valley Conference men's soccer season =

Missouri Valley Conference
- Season: 2009
- Champions: Missouri State
- MVC Tourney Winner: Drake
- To NCAA Tournament: Drake; Missouri State

The 2009 Missouri Valley Conference men's soccer season was the 19th season of men's varsity soccer in the conference.

The 2009 Missouri Valley Conference Men's Soccer Tournament was hosted and won by Drake.

== Teams ==
2009 Missouri Valley Conference men's soccer standings
	Conf.					Overall
Team	W		L		T	W		L		T
Missouri State	7	–	1	–	1	12	–	5	–	2
No. 8 Drake †	6	–	3	–	1	16	–	7	–	2
Creighton	4	–	2	–	4	7	–	5	–	5
Evansville	5	–	4	–	1	12	–	17	–	1
Eastern Illinois	2	–	6	–	1	6	–	8	–	3
Bradley	1	–	9	–	0	6	–	11	–	1
† 2009 MVC Tournament winner As of December 15, 2009; Rankings from NSCAA
