= 2020 Missouri Valley Conference men's soccer tournament =

- Classification: Division I
- Teams: 4
- Matches: 3
- Attendance: 1,193
- Site: Campus sites Various
- Champions: Missouri State
- Broadcast: ESPN+

The 2020 Missouri Valley men's soccer tournament was the 31st edition of the Missouri Valley Conference Men's Soccer Tournament. The tournament decided the Missouri Valley Conference champion and guaranteed representative into the 2020 NCAA Division I men's soccer tournament.

== Background ==
The 2020 Missouri Valley Men's Soccer Tournament was originally to be played in November 2020. However, the Missouri Valley Conference postponed all fall sports with the hope to play them in the spring.

== Format ==
The MVC Tournament will be contested by the league's top four teams, with the higher seed hosting each game.

== Qualified teams ==
In the event that not all teams in the conference finish with the same number of games played, points per game will be used to determine the final standings.

Seed	Team	Conference record
1	Missouri State	7-1-0
2	Drake	5-2-1
3	Loyola-Chicago	5-2-1
4	Bradley	1-6-1

== Bracket ==
Semifinals
1	Missouri State	3
4	Bradley	1
3	Loyola-Chicago	4
2	Drake	1

Finals
1	Missouri State	1
3	Loyola-Chicago	0

== Matches ==
=== Semifinals ===
April 13, 2021
6:00 p.m. CT

Missouri State	3–1	Bradley
Aadne Bruseth 10'; Nicolo Mulatero 38'; Jesus Barea 40'	Report	Rasmus Smidtslund 5'

Betty & Bobby Allison South Stadium
Attendance: 477
April 13, 2021
2:00 p.m. CT

Drake	1–4	Loyola-Chicago
Erik Sigman 37'	Report	Billy Hency 33' (pen.); Erik Fahner 42' (o.g.); Oscar Dueso 48'; Marc Torrellas 73'

Drake Stadium
Attendance: 73

=== Final ===
April 17, 2021
2:00 p.m. CT

Missouri State	1–0	Loyola-Chicago
Adrian Barosen 76'	Report

Betty & Bobby Allison South Stadium
Attendance: 643
