= 1992 Missouri Valley Conference men's soccer season =

Missouri Valley Conference
- Season: 1992
- Champions: Creighton
- MVC Tourney Winner: Creighton
- To NCAA Tournament: Creighton

The 1992 Missouri Valley Conference men's soccer season was the 2nd season of men's varsity soccer in the conference.

The 1992 Missouri Valley Conference Men's Soccer Tournament was hosted and won by Creighton.

== Teams ==
1992 Missouri Valley Conference men's soccer standings
	Conf.					Overall
Team	W		L		T	W		L		T
No. 2 Creighton †	4	–	0	–	1	14	–	3	–	1
Illinois State	3	–	2	–	0	10	–	8	–	2
Bradley	3	–	2	–	0	11	–	7	–	1
Drake	2	–	2	–	1	6	–	12	–	2
Tulsa	2	–	3	–	0	7	–	8	–	2
Missouri State	0	–	5	–	0	4	–	15	–	0
† 1992 MVC Tournament winner As of December 8, 1992; Rankings from NSCAA
