= 1991 Missouri Valley Conference men's soccer season =

Missouri Valley Conference
- Season: 1991
- Champions: Tulsa
- MVC Tourney Winner: Tulsa
- To NCAA Tournament: Tulsa

The 1991 Missouri Valley Conference men's soccer season was the 1st season of men's varsity soccer in the conference. It was contested by teams from the Midwest region of the United States.

The 1991 Missouri Valley Conference Men's Soccer Tournament was hosted and won by Tulsa.

== Teams ==
1991 Missouri Valley Conference men's soccer standings
	Conf.					Overall
Team	W		L		T	W		L		T
No. 21 Tulsa †	4	–	0	–	0	14	–	3	–	0
Creighton	3	–	1	–	0	12	–	5	–	2
Illinois State	3	–	2	–	0	10	–	12	–	0
Missouri State	1	–	2	–	0	9	–	10	–	0
Drake	1	–	2	–	0	6	–	10	–	0
Bradley	0	–	5	–	0	6	–	14	–	0
† 1991 MVC Tournament winner As of December 10, 1991; Rankings from NSCAA
