= 2023 Missouri Valley Conference men's soccer tournament =

- Classification: Division I
- Teams: 6
- Matches: 5
- Attendance: 2,751
- Site: WMU Soccer Complex (Semifinals & Final); Kalamazoo, Michigan
- Champions: Western Michigan (1st title)
- Winning coach: Chad Wiseman (1st title)
- MVP: Charlie Sharp (Western Michigan)
- Broadcast: ESPN+

2023 Missouri Valley Conference men's soccer standings
	Conf.					Overall
Team	W		L		T	W		L		T
No. 24 Missouri State +	7	–	0	–	1	12	–	2	–	2
Drake	5	–	1	–	2	9	–	4	–	3
Bowling Green	4	–	3	–	1	10	–	5	–	2
No. 20 Western Michigan	3	–	1	–	4	11	–	1	–	6
Evansville ‡	4	–	3	–	1	8	–	6	–	3
UIC	3	–	5	–	0	7	–	9	–	0
Belmont	1	–	5	–	2	5	–	8	–	4
Bradley	1	–	5	–	2	4	–	8	–	4
Northern Illinois	1	–	6	–	1	3	–	12	–	1
‡ – 2023 MVC Tournament champion + – At-large invitation to the 2023 NCAA tournament; As of December 17, 2024; Rankings from United Soccer Coaches; Source: MVC

The 2023 Missouri Valley Conference men's soccer tournament was the postseason men's soccer tournament for the Missouri Valley Conference held from November 5 through November 11, 2023. The First Round was held at campus sites. The semifinals and finals took place at WMU Soccer Complex in Kalamazoo, Michigan. The six-team single-elimination tournament consisted of three rounds based on seeding from regular season conference play. The defending champions were the Missouri State Bears They were unable to defend their title, losing in the final to the Western Michigan Broncos This was the first conference tournament title for the Western Michigan men's soccer program, as the joined the conference in 2023. Western Michigan had two MAC conference tournament titles prior to joining the MVC. It was also Chad Wiseman's first MVC title as head coach, previously having one in the MAC. As tournament champions, Western Michigan earned the Missouri Valley's automatic berth into the 2023 NCAA Division I men's soccer tournament.

== Seeding ==
Six of the nine Missouri Valley Conference men's soccer programs qualified for the 2023 Tournament. Teams were seeded based on regular season conference record and tiebreakers were used to determine seedings of teams that finished with the same record. A tiebreaker was required to determine the fifth and sixth seeds of the tournament as Belmont and Northern Illinois both finished with 3–4–1 regular season records. Northern Illinois defeated Belmont 1–0 in their October 22 regular season meeting. Therefore, Northern Illinois was the fifth seed and Belmont was the sixth seed.

Seed	School	Conference Record	Points
1	Western Michigan	7–0–1	22
2	Missouri State	6–1–1	19
3	UIC	4–2–2	14
4	Bowling Green	4–4–0	12
5	Northern Illinois	3–4–1	10
6	Belmont	3–4–1	10

== Bracket ==
Teams were re-seeded after the first round.

Quarterfinals; Sunday, Nov. 5
4	Bowling Green	1
5	Northern Illinois	2
3	UIC	2
6	Belmont	1

Semifinals; Wednesday, Nov. 8
1	Western Michigan (a.e.t.)	3
5	Northern Illinois	1
2	Missouri State	1
3	UIC	0

Final; Saturday, Nov. 11
1	Western Michigan	2
2	Missouri State	1

== Schedule ==
=== Quarterfinals ===
November 5	#3 UIC	2–1	#6 Belmont	Chicago, IL
1:00 p.m. CT	Jesus De Vicente 52' (pen.); Luka Nedic (yellow card) 60'; Sidney Warden 81', (yellow card) 90'; Ezau Millan (yellow card) 89'; Darien Martin (yellow card) 90'	Report	(yellow card) 55' Riley Clothier; 56' Jansen Wilson	Stadium: Flames Field; Attendance: 917; Referee: Dimitrios Katsimingos; Assistant referees: Ethan Buege; Vasillios Vouris; Fourth official: Jorge Cuate Ballinas

November 5	#4 Bowling Green	1–2	#5 Northern Illinois	Bowling Green, OH
6:00 p.m. ET	Alberto Anaya (yellow card) 34'; Jake Bergin (yellow card) 55'; Mads Christensen (yellow card) 76'; Kyle Cusimano 81'	Report	(yellow card) 46' Patrick Coleman; 57' Diego Maynez; 63' Camilo Estrada; (yellow card) 76' Taisei Arima	Stadium: Cochrane Stadium; Attendance: 697; Referee: Eulogio Villalpando; Assistant referees: Rob Ruta; David Eberline; Fourth official: Maxwell Unger

=== Semifinals ===
November 8	#2 Missouri State	1–0	#3 UIC	Kalamazoo, MI
11:00 a.m. ET	Gijs Hovius 10'; Mattia Petricca (yellow card) 31'; Tyler Caton (yellow card) 39'; Team (yellow card) 71'	Report	(yellow card) 18' Darrell Turcios; (yellow card) 71' Jesus De Vicente; (yellow card) 78' Ezau Millan	Stadium: WMU Soccer Complex; Attendance: 100

November 8	#1 Western Michigan	3–1 (a.e.t.)	#5 Northern Illinois	Kalamazoo, MI
2:00 p.m. ET	Charlie Sharp 82', 103', (yellow card) 87'; Jonathan Robinson 99'	Report	(yellow card) 58' Dylan Banker; 63' Zachariah Thomas	Stadium: WMU Soccer Complex; Attendance: 276

=== Final ===
November 11	#1 Western Michigan	2–1	#2 Missouri State	Kalamazoo, MI
1:00 p.m. ET	Charlie Sharp 13', 89'	Report	84' Jack Denton	Stadium: WMU Soccer Complex; Attendance: 761

== Statistics ==
=== Goalscorers ===
There were 14 goals scored in 5 matches, for an average of 2.8 goals per match (as of November 11, 2023).

4 goals

- Charlie Sharp – Western Michigan

1 goal

- Jansen Wilson – Belmont
- Kyle Cusimano – Bowling Green
- Jack Denton – Missouri State
- Gijs Hovius – Missouri State
- Camilo Estrada – Northern Illinois
- Diego Maynez – Northern Illinois
- Zachariah Thomas – Northern Illinois
- Jesus De Vicente – UIC
- Sidney Warden – UIC
- Jonathan Robinson – Western Michigan

== All-Tournament team ==
Player	Team
Jansen Wilson	Belmont
Nathan Masters	Bowling Green
Jesus Barea	Missouri State
Tyler Caton	Missouri State
Gijs Hovius	Missouri State
Rakub Rojek	Northern Illinois
Luis Hernandez	Northern Illinois
Juan Gutierrez	UIC
Ezau Millan	UIC
Landon Fisher	Western Michigan
Noah Janes	Western Michigan
**Charlie Sharp**	Western Michigan
Nick Stone	Western Michigan

MVP in bold
