= 2024 Missouri Valley Conference men's soccer tournament =

- Classification: Division I
- Teams: 6
- Matches: 5
- Attendance: 2,343
- Site: Allison South Stadium (Semifinals & Final); Springfield, Missouri
- Champions: Evansville (2nd title)
- Winning coach: Robbe Tarver (1st title)
- MVP: Kai Phillips (Evansville)
- Broadcast: ESPN+

2024 Missouri Valley Conference men's soccer standings
	Conf.					Overall
Team	W		L		T	W		L		T
No. 11 Missouri State +	7	–	0	–	1	12	–	3	–	2
Drake	5	–	1	–	2	9	–	5	–	3
Bowling Green	4	–	3	–	1	12	–	6	–	2
No. 23 Western Michigan+	3	–	1	–	4	11	–	2	–	6
Evansville ‡	4	–	3	–	1	11	–	6	–	3
UIC	3	–	5	–	0	7	–	10	–	0
Bradley	1	–	5	–	2	4	–	8	–	3
Belmont	1	–	5	–	2	5	–	8	–	4
Northern Illinois	1	–	6	–	1	3	–	12	–	1
‡ – 2024 MVC tournament champion + – At-large invitation to the 2024 NCAA tournament; As of November 18, 2024; Rankings from United Soccer Coaches; Source: MVC

The 2024 Missouri Valley Conference men's soccer tournament was the postseason men's soccer tournament for the Missouri Valley Conference held from November 10 through November 16, 2024. The First Round was held at campus sites. The semifinals and finals took place at Allison South Stadium in Springfield, Missouri. The six-team single-elimination tournament consisted of three rounds based on seeding from regular season conference play. The defending champions were the Western Michigan Broncos They were unable to defend their title, losing as the fourth seed in the First Round to the Evansville Purple Aces in overtime 2–1. Fifth seed Evansville would go on to win the tournament, defeating Bowling Green in overtime, in the Final, 3–2. This was the second conference tournament title for the Evansville men's soccer program. It was the first tournament title for head coach Robbe Tarver. As tournament champions, Evansville earned the Missouri Valley's automatic berth into the 2024 NCAA Division I men's soccer tournament.

== Seeding ==
Six of the nine Missouri Valley Conference men's soccer programs qualified for the 2024 Tournament. Teams were seeded based on regular season conference record and tiebreakers were used to determine seedings of teams that finished with the same record. A three-team tiebreaker was required as Bowling Green, Evansville, and Western Michigan all finished with thirteen points during regular season conference play. The first tiebreaker was record against the other tied teams. Each team had a 1–1 record in this tiebreaker. The second tiebreaker was conference-only goal differential. Bowling Green earned the third seed in this tiebreaker with their +3 goal difference. Western Michigan had a 0 goal difference and Evansville had a -1 goal difference. Western Michigan earned the fourth seed by virtue of their head-to-head regular season conference victory over Evansville.

Seed	School	Conference Record	Points
1	Missouri State	7–0–1	22
2	Drake	5–1–2	17
3	Bowling Green	4–3–1	13
4	Western Michigan	3–1–4	13
5	Evansville	4–3–1	13
6	UIC	3–5–0	9

== Bracket ==
Teams were re-seeded after the first round.

Quarterfinals; Sunday, Nov. 10
4	Western Michigan	1
5	Evansville (a.e.t)	2
3	Bowling Green	4
6	UIC	1

Semifinals; Wednesday, Nov. 13
1	Missouri State	0
5	Evansville	1
2	Drake	0
3	Bowling Green	1

Final; Saturday, Nov. 16
5	Evansville (a.e.t)	3
3	Bowling Green	2

== Schedule ==
=== Quarterfinals ===
November 10, 2024	#4 Western Michigan	1–2 (a.e.t.)	#5 Evansville	Kalamazoo, MI
10:00 a.m. CT	Landon Fisher (yellow card) 19'; Duarte Chapelas (yellow card) 62'; Noah James 74'	Report	(yellow card) 11' Michal Mroz; (yellow card) 12' Jose Vivas; 79', (yellow card) 86' Kai Phillip; 108' Martin Wurschmidt	Stadium: WMU Soccer Complex; Attendance: 245; Referee: Austin Saini; Assistant referees: Peter Charpentier; Fernando Pina; Fourth official: John Douglas

November 10, 2024	#3 Bowling Green	4–1	#6 UIC	Bowling Green, OH
6:00 p.m. CT	Jake Bergin 1'; Josh Erlandson (yellow card) 30'; Ryko Bodurov 43', 64'; Bennett Painter 81'	Report	72' Bart Muns	Stadium: Cochrane Stadium; Attendance: 1,124; Referee: Dimitar Chavdarav; Assistant referees: Josh Braunstein; Cristian Vorovenci; Fourth official: Stephen Phiri

=== Semifinals ===
November 13, 2024	#2 Drake	0–1	#3 Bowling Green	Springfield, MO
3:00 p.m. CST	Kai Knuchel (yellow card) 21'; J.P. Pascarella (yellow card) 83'	Report	(yellow card) 64' Josh Erlandson; (yellow card) 67' Gus Peacock; (yellow card) 79' Alberto Anaya; 81' Trace Terry	Stadium: Allison South Stadium; Attendance: 135; Referee: Shane Butler; Assistant referees: Drew Klemp; Dan Ortega; Fourth official: Tim Wagner

November 13, 2024	#1 Missouri State	0–1	#5 Evansville	Springfield, MO
6:00 p.m. CST		Report	(yellow card) 26' Jose Vivas; 50' Nacho Garcia; (yellow card) 50' Kai Phillip; (yellow card) 60' Nacho Diaz-Caneja; (yellow card) 60' Tobias Bak	Stadium: Allison South Stadium; Attendance: 635; Referee: Calin Radosav; Assistant referees: Zachary Richter; Ryan Cook; Fourth official: Luis Tribaldo

=== Final ===
November 16, 2024	#3 Bowling Green	2–3 (a.e.t.)	#5 Evansville	Springfield, MO
6:30 p.m. CST	Andrew Shaffer 34'; Jake Lane 40'; Kyle Blasingame (yellow card) 80'	Report	30' Kai Phillip; 79' Baraka Tarleton; (yellow card) 82' Nacho Garcia; (yellow card) 94' Jacopo Fedrizzi; 99' Bowling Green Own Goal	Stadium: Allison South Stadium; Attendance: 204; Referee: Eulogio Villalpando; Assistant referees: Misael Cordero; Shane Cowger; Fourth official: Shadd Delmez

== Statistics ==
=== Goalscorers ===
There were 15 goals scored in 5 matches, for an average of 3 goals per match (as of November 16, 2024).

2 goals

- Ryko Bodurov – Bowling Green
- Kai Phillip – Evansville

1 goal

- Jake Bergin – Bowling Green
- Nacho Garcia – Evansville
- Noah James – Western Michigan
- Jake Lane – Bowling Green
- Bart Muns – UIC
- Bennett Painter – Bowling Green
- Andrew Shaffer – Bowling Green
- Baraka Tarleton – Evansville
- Trace Terry – Bowling Green
- Martin Wurschmidt – Evansville

1 own goal

- Bowling Green (vs. Evansville)

== All-Tournament team ==
Player	Team
Brendan Graves	Bowling Green
Jake Lane	Bowling Green
Trace Terry	Bowling Green
Ryder Barrett	Drake
Eskil Gjerde	Drake
Jacopo Fedrizzi	Evansville
Nacho Garcia	Evansville
**Kai Phillips**	Evansville
Martin Wurschmidt	Evansville
Tyler Caton	Missouri State
Alex Matthews	Missouri State
Bart Muns	UIC
Noah James	Western Michigan

MVP in bold
