= 2018 Missouri Valley Conference women's soccer tournament =

- Classification: Division I
- Teams: 6
- Matches: 5
- Attendance: 1,279
- Site: Loyola Soccer Park; Chicago, Illinois (Semifinals & Final)
- Champions: Loyola (1st title)
- Winning coach: Barry Bimbi (1st title)
- MVP: Jenna Szczesny (Loyola)
- Broadcast: ESPN+

2018 Missouri Valley Conference women's soccer standings
	Conf.						Overall
Team	W		L		T	PCT	W		L		T	PCT
Loyola ‍†‍‡‍^{y}	6	–	1	–	0	.857	11	–	7	–	1	.605
Drake ‍‍‍	5	–	1	–	1	.786	9	–	9	–	1	.500
UNI ‍‍‍	4	–	3	–	0	.571	9	–	7	–	3	.553
Illinois State ‍‍‍	4	–	3	–	0	.571	10	–	9	–	2	.524
Missouri State ‍‍‍	2	–	3	–	2	.429	8	–	9	–	2	.474
Valparaiso ‍‍‍	2	–	4	–	1	.357	5	–	8	–	3	.406
Evansville ‍‍‍	2	–	4	–	1	.357	4	–	12	–	3	.289
Indiana State ‍‍‍	0	–	6	–	1	.071	6	–	9	–	3	.417
† – Conference champion ‡ – 2018 Missouri Valley Tournament champion y – Invited to the NCAA tournament As of November 14, 2018; Rankings from United Soccer Coaches Poll; Source:Missouri Valley Conference

The 2018 Missouri Valley Conference women's soccer tournament was the postseason women's soccer tournament for the Missouri Valley Conference held from October 28 through November 4, 2018. The opening round matches of the tournament were held at campus sites, while the semifinals and final took place at Loyola Soccer Park in Chicago, Illinois. The six-team single-elimination tournament consisted of three rounds based on seeding from regular season conference play. The defending champions were the Missouri State Lady Bears, but they were eliminated from the 2018 tournament with a 1–0 loss to the Illinois State Redbirds in the opening round. The Loyola won the tournament with a 3–2 win over Drake in the final. The conference tournament title was the first for the Loyola women's soccer program and the first for head coach Barry Bimbi.

== Bracket ==
Opening Round; Sunday, Oct. 28
3	UNI	0 (2)
6	Evansville	0 (3)
4	Illinois State	1
5	Missouri State	0

Semifinals; Friday, Nov. 2
2	Drake	1^{2OT}
6	Evansville	0
1	Loyola	2
4	Illinois State	1

Final; Sunday, Nov. 4
2	Drake	2
1	Loyola	3

== Schedule ==
=== Opening Round ===
October 28, 2018	#3 UNI	0–0 (a.e.t.) (2–3 p)	#6 Evansville	Waterloo, Iowa
12:00 p.m.		Report	Jordyn Rolli (yellow card) 106'	Stadium: Cedar Valley Soccer Complex; Attendance: 289; Referee: Tyler Tuner; Assistant referees: Trent Payne; Chris Civitate; Fourth official: Bryan Foster
	Penalties
	Kelsey Yarrow (penalty missed); Sydney Hayden (penalty missed); Maddy Germann (penalty scored); Julianne Trizzino (penalty scored); Hannah McDevitt (penalty missed); Claire Netten (penalty missed); Genevieve Cruz (penalty missed)		Karsyn Kleinrichert (penalty missed); Jayme-Lee Hunter (penalty scored); Emily Ormson (penalty missed); Maggie Leazer (penalty missed); Morgan Blair (penalty scored); Montana Portenier (penalty missed); Amanda DaSilva (penalty scored)

October 28, 2018	#4 Illinois State	1–0	#5 Missouri State	Normal, Illinois
1:00 p.m.	Abby Basler 75'	Report		Stadium: Adelaide State Field; Attendance: 166; Referee: Keith Angel; Assistant referees: Miguel Chavez; Victor Herrera; Fourth official: Brian Lynch

=== Semifinals ===
November 2, 2018	#2 Drake	1–0 (a.e.t.)	#6 Evansville	Chicago, Illinois
3:30 p.m.	Hannah Bormann (yellow card) 58'; Libby Helverson 102'	Report		Stadium: Loyola Soccer Park; Referee: Tony Delois; Assistant referees: Sergio Alvarez; Russ Doszak; Fourth official: Zach Bond

November 2, 2018	#1 Loyola	2–1	#4 Illinois State	Chicago, Illinois
6:00 p.m.	Madison Kimball 6'; Jenna Szczesny 30'	Report	Mikayla Unger 51', (yellow card) 83'	Stadium: Loyola Soccer Park; Attendance: 511; Referee: Kyle Trimble; Assistant referees: Victor Herrera; Juan Matute; Fourth official: Abby Okaluja

=== Final ===
November 4, 2018	#1 Loyola	3–2	#2 Drake	Chicago, Illinois
1:00 p.m.	Jenna Szczesny 11' (pen.), (yellow card) 50'; Abby Swanson 69'; Kat Stephens 75'	Report	Olivia Bruce 11' (pen.), 54'; Team (yellow card) 60'	Stadium: Loyola Soccer Park; Attendance: 313; Referee: Rebecca Pagan; Assistant referees: Ethan Buege; Rachel Smith; Fourth official: Abiodun Okulaja

== Statistics ==
=== Goalscorers ===
2 Goals

- Olivia Bruce - Drake
- Jenna Szczesny - Loyola

1 Goal

- Abby Basler - Illinois State
- Libby Helverson - Drake
- Madison Kimball - Loyola
- Kat Stephens - Loyola
- Abby Swanson - Loyola
- Mikayla Unger - Illinois State

== All-Tournament team ==
Player	Team
Kaitlin Maxwell	Missouri State
Jami Reichenberger	UNI
Morgan Blair	Evansville
Michaela Till	Evansville
Abby Basler	Illinois State
Alissa Ramsden	Illinois State
Linda Fiorito	Drake
Olivia Bruce	Drake
Cassie Rohan	Drake
Abby Swanson	Loyola
Katharine Stephens	Loyola
Madison Laudeman	Loyola
Jenna Szczesny	Loyola (MVP)

== See also ==
- 2018 Missouri Valley Conference Men's Soccer Tournament
