= Tom Howe =

Tom Howe may refer to:

- Tom Howe (soccer) (born 1949), American soccer midfielder
- Tom Howe (rugby union) (born 1995), English rugby union player
- Tom Howe (musician) (born 1977), British-born musician
