= Matt Caution =

American soccer player (born 1974)

Personal information
- Date of birth: November 29, 1974 (age 51)
- Place of birth: St. Louis, Missouri, U.S.
- Height: 5 ft 8 in (1.73 m)
- Positions: Forward; defender

College career
Years	Team	Apps	(Gls)
1993–1997	Missouri State Bears		

Senior career*
Years	Team	Apps	(Gls)
1994	St. Louis Knights		
1998–1999	Cincinnati Riverhawks	48	(13)
1999–2000	St. Louis Ambush (indoor)	18	(1)
2000	Indiana Blast	23	(7)
2000–2001	Buffalo Blizzard (indoor)	29	(7)
2001–2002	Cleveland Crunch (indoor)	25	(2)
2003–2005	St. Louis Steamers (indoor)	61	(7)
2005–2008	California Cougars (indoor)	58	(5)
2008	Orlando Sharks (indoor)	6	(1)
- * Club domestic league appearances and goals

Matthew Caution is an American retired soccer player who played professionally in the USISL and the National Professional Soccer League.

== Youth ==
In 1993, Caution graduated from Fort Zumwalt South High School. He attended Southwest Missouri State University, playing on the men's soccer team from 1993 to 1997. In 1994, he broke his leg while playing for the St. Louis Knights of the USISL during the collegiate off-season. He lost his 1994 season with the Bears, but returned in 1995 and played through the 1997 season. He holds the school record for points (125), goals (46) and assists (33).

== Professional ==
On February 1, 1998, the Dallas Burn selected Caution in the third round (twenty-fifth overall) of the 1998 MLS College Draft. On March 1, 1998, the Burn waived him during a pre-season roster reduction. He signed with the Cincinnati Riverhawks of the USISL A-League where he played the 1998 and 1999 season. In December 1999, he signed with the St. Louis Ambush of the National Professional Soccer League and played through the end of the 1999–2000 season. In 2000, he played for the Indiana Blast. In the fall of 2000, Caution signed with the Buffalo Blizzard of the NPSL. The Blizzard folded at the end of the season and the Cleveland Crunch selected Caution in the Dispersal Draft. The Crunch traded Caution to the St. Louis Steamers in exchange for Clint Regier in 2002. When the Steamers announced they would sit out the 2002–2003 season, the league held a dispersal draft in August 2002 and the Philadelphia KiXX selected Caution. On October 2, 2002, The KiXX then traded Caution to the Kansas City Comets for Matt Knowles. Through all these trades, Caution did not suit up for any of these teams. On October 2, 2003, Caution joined the Steamers as they re-entered the league. In 2005, the California Cougars selected Caution in the MISL Expansion Draft. In 2008, the Cougars traded Caution to the Orlando Sharks where Caution finished his career.
