= Tom Howe (soccer) =

American soccer player

Personal information
- Date of birth: October 5, 1949 (age 77)
- Place of birth: St. Louis, Missouri, U.S.
- Position: Midfielder

College career
Years	Team	Apps	(Gls)
1968–1971	SIU Edwardsville Cougars		

Senior career*
Years	Team	Apps	(Gls)
1973–1974	St. Louis Stars	23	(0)
1975	Denver Dynamos	1	(0)
1976	Minnesota Kicks	6	(0)

Managerial career
- 1990–1991: Southwest Missouri State
- * Club domestic league appearances and goals

Tom Howe is an American retired soccer midfielder who played professionally in the North American Soccer League.

Howe attended Southern Illinois University Edwardsville, playing on the men's soccer team from 1968 to 1971. In 2007, he was inducted into the Cougars Hall of Fame. In 1973, Howe joined the St. Louis Stars of the North American Soccer League. He went on to play for the Denver Dynamos and the Minnesota Kicks.

In 2004, Howe was inducted into the St. Louis Soccer Hall of Fame. Howe helped found and coached at the Scott Gallagher Soccer Club. He currently is the executive director of Coaching and Player Development at Sporting St. Louis.
