= Arad McCutchan Stadium =

Stadium in Evansville, Indiana, United States

McCutchan Stadium
- Interactive map of McCutchan Stadium
- Address: 1800 Lincoln Ave. Evansville, IN; United States
- Owner: University of Evansville
- Operator: Univ. of Evansville Athletics
- Capacity: 2,500
- Type: Soccer-specific stadium
- Surface: Grass
- Public transit: METS

Construction
- Groundbreaking: November 3, 1984
- Built: 1984–1985
- Opened: September 21, 1985
- Renovated: 2000

Tenants
- Evansville Purple Aces (NCAA) teams: Men's soccer (2000–present); football (1985–1997)

Website
- gopurpleaces.com/mccutchan-stadium

Arad McCutchan Stadium is a stadium located in Evansville, Indiana, United States, owned and operated by the University of Evansville.

The venue was originally built for the University's football team, which played there until the program was discontinued in 1997. Since 2000, it has served as home of the Evansville Purple Aces men's and women's soccer teams.

The stadium is named after Arad McCutchan, who was the basketball coach at the university for 31 years, (1946–1977), achieving a record of 514–314. McCutchan is regarded as the most important person in the athletics history of the university.

Since its establishment as a soccer-specific venue, McCutchan Stadium has hosted numerous post season Missouri Valley Conference tournaments, and even NCAA tournaments.
