= Loyola Ramblers men's soccer =

American college soccer team

- Founded: 1981; 45 years ago
- University: Loyola University Chicago
- Head coach: Kevin Robson (1st season)
- Conference: A-10
- Location: Chicago, Illinois, US
- Stadium: Loyola Soccer Park (capacity: 500)
- Nickname: Ramblers
- Colors: Maroon and gold
Home	Away

NCAA tournament appearances
- 2006, 2008, 2011, 2016, 2019

Conference tournament championships
- Horizon–2006, 2008, 2011; MVC– 2019

Conference regular season championships
- Horizon–2000, 2007; MVC– 2016

The Loyola Ramblers men's soccer team represents Loyola University Chicago in the Atlantic 10 Conference of NCAA Division I soccer. The Ramblers play their home matches at Loyola Soccer Park in the Rogers Park neighborhood of Chicago.

== Record by year ==
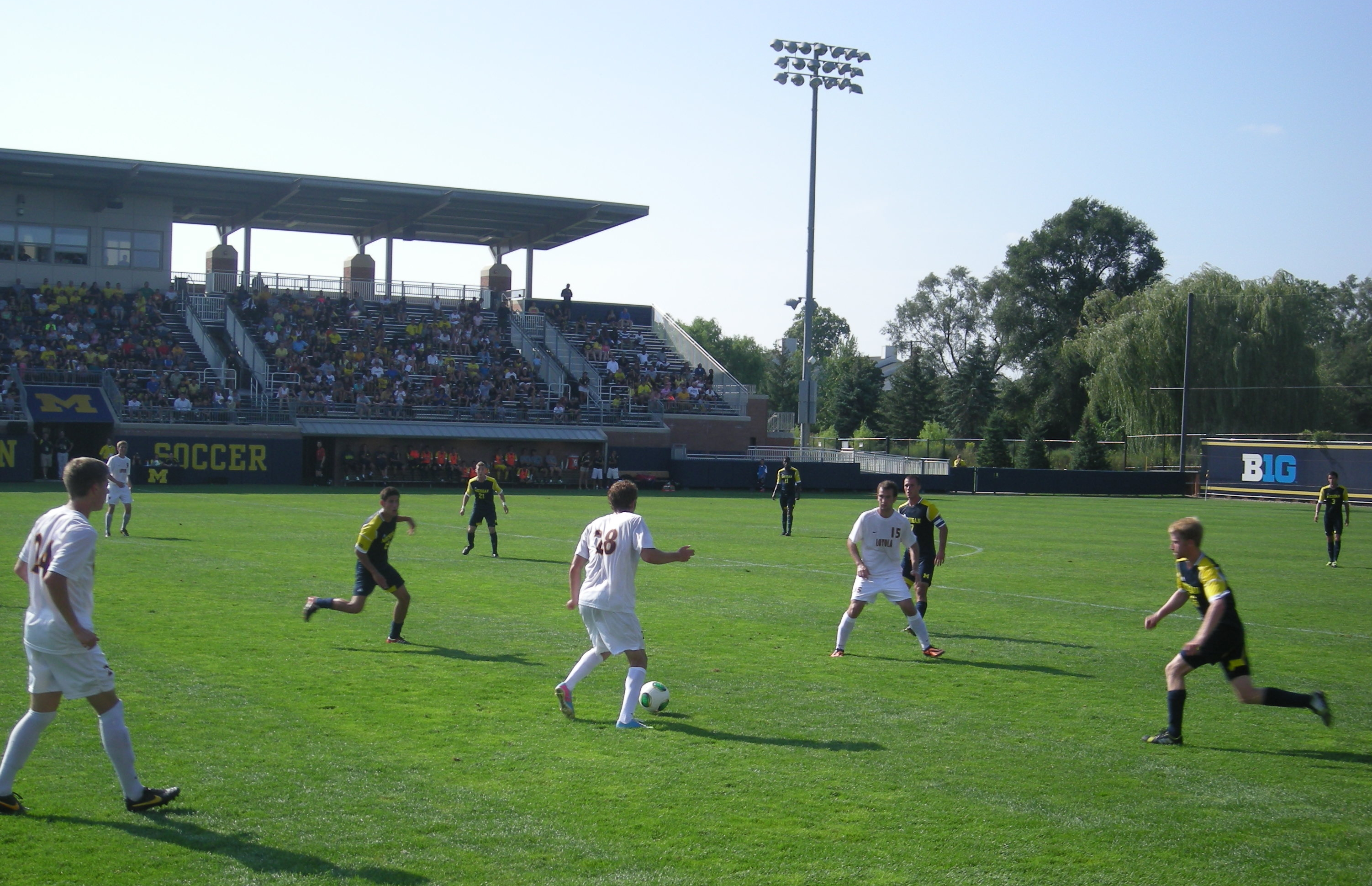
Loyola (in white) playing against Michigan in 2013

Record table
Season	Coach	Overall	Conference	Standing	Postseason
Loyola Ramblers (Division I Independent) (1981–Only)
1981	Ray O’Connell	7–11–4			
Loyola Ramblers (MMSC) (1982–1986)
1982	Ray O’Connell	12–7–1	2–2–1	t-5th	
1983	Ray O’Connell	12–10–1	2–3–0	n/a	
1984	Ray O’Connell	13–7–2	2–3–0	n/a	
1985	Ray O’Connell	9–11–0	0–5–0	6th	
1986	Ray O’Connell	10–10–1	1–3–1	n/a	
Loyola Ramblers (Horizon League (aka MCC 1987–98)) (1987–2012)
1987	Ray O’Connell	9–9–4		5th	
1988	Ray O’Connell	5–14–2	0–4–1	7th	
1989	Ray O’Connell	10–10–0	1–5–0	t-4th North	
1990	Ray O’Connell	8–9–4	2–5–1	t-6th	
1991	Ray O’Connell	9–7–2	4–1–1	t-2nd	
1992	Ray O’Connell	5–12–1	2–4–1	t-5th	
1993	Ray O’Connell	9–8–1	2–4–0	t-4th	
1994	Ray O’Connell	8–11–0	2–5–0	5th West	
1995	Ray O’Connell	8–10–1	2–6–0	t-7th	
1996	Ray O’Connell	11–7–1	3–4–1	t-4th	
1997	Ray O’Connell	4–14–1	0–6–1	8th	
1998	Ray O’Connell	5–14–0	2–5–0	6th	
1999	Ray O’Connell	6–10–3	3–3–1	4th	
2000	Ray O’Connell	11–8–1	5–1–1	t-1st	
2001	Ray O’Connell	6–10–2	3–4–0	5th	
2002	Ray O’Connell	3–16–0	0–7–0	8th	
2003	Ray O’Connell	7–9–2	2–5–0	t-6th	
2004	Ray O’Connell	3–14–1	2–5–0	7th	
2005	Brendan Eitz	7–9–2	4–3–0	t-4th	
2006	Brendan Eitz	11–8–2	4–2–1	t-3rd	NCAA 1st round
2007	Brendan Eitz	10–5–4	5–1–2	1st	
2008	Brendan Eitz	12–6–4	3–3–2	5th	NCAA 1st round
2009	Brendan Eitz	4–8–4	1–5–2	9th	
2010	Brendan Eitz	5–11–2	4–3–1	t-3rd	
2011	Brendan Eitz	7–12–1	3–5–0	6th	NCAA 1st round
2012	Brandon Eitz	5–12–2	2–3–2	t-5th	
Loyola Ramblers (Missouri Valley Conference) (2013–2021)
2013	Neil Jones	6–11–2	2–3–1	5th of 7	
2014	Neil Jones	8–6–5	2–2–2	5th of 7	
2015	Neil Jones	10–4–5	2–2–2	5th of 7	
2016	Neil Jones	14–4–1	6–1–1	1st of 7	NCAA 2nd round
2017	Neil Jones	7–8–3	3–4–1	t-4th of 7	
2018	Neil Jones	10–7–2	3–1–2	2nd of 7	
2019	Neil Jones	11–5–4	5–2–3	2nd of 6	NCAA 1st round
2020	Neil Jones	7–4–2	5–2–1	2nd	
2021	Neil Jones	9–5–2	6–3–1	2nd	
Loyola Ramblers (Atlantic 10 Conference) (2022–present)
2022	Steve Bode	9–2–7	3–2–3	5th	
2023	Steve Bode	8–2–5	4–1–3	2nd	
2024	Steve Bode	5–9–2	3–4–1	9th	
2025	Steve Bode	4–5–7	1–3–4	10th	
Total:		355–386–96	102–142–41		
National champion Postseason invitational champion Conference regular season champion Conference regular season and conference tournament champion Division regular season champion Division regular season and conference tournament champion Conference tournament champion
