= Western Kentucky Hilltoppers and Lady Toppers =

Athletic team for Western Kentucky University

- University: Western Kentucky University
- Nickname: Hilltoppers and Lady Toppers
- NCAA: Division I (FBS)
- Conference: Conference USA
- Athletic director: Todd Stewart
- Location: Bowling Green, Kentucky
- Varsity teams: 16 (7 men’s and 9 women’s)
- Football stadium: Houchens Industries - L. T. Smith Stadium
- Basketball arena: E. A. Diddle Arena
- Baseball stadium: Nick Denes Field
- Softball stadium: WKU Softball Complex
- Colors: Red and white
- Mascot: Big Red
- Fight song: Stand Up and Cheer
- Website: www.wkusports.com

Team NCAA championships
- 1

Individual and relay NCAA champions
- 6

The Western Kentucky Hilltoppers and Lady Toppers are the athletic teams that represent Western Kentucky University (WKU), located in Bowling Green, Kentucky, in intercollegiate sports as a member of the NCAA Division I ranks, competing in the Conference USA (C-USA) since the 2014–15 academic year. The Hilltoppers and Lady Toppers previously competed in the Sun Belt Conference from 1982–83 to 2013–14; and in the Ohio Valley Conference (OVC) from 1948–49 to 1981–82.

The men's teams use the name Hilltoppers; however, the women's teams use the name Lady Toppers.

== Varsity teams ==
WKU competes in 16 intercollegiate varsity sports: Men's sports include baseball, basketball, cross country, football, golf and track & field; while women's sports include basketball, cross country, golf, soccer, softball, tennis, track & field and volleyball.

Men's sports	Women's sports
Baseball	Basketball
Basketball	Cross country
Cross country	Golf
Football	Soccer
Golf	Softball
Track and field^{1}	Tennis
	Track and field^{1}
	Volleyball
^{1} – includes both indoor and outdoor

=== Baseball ===
Conference USA logo in WKU's colors

WKU baseball competes at Nick Denes Field. The team won the Sun Belt Conference championship in 2009, their first Sun Belt title. The team also won the Conference USA championship in 2025.

First Year: 1910 All-Time Record:1736–1448–17 (.545) Conference Championships: 3 (1952, 80, 2009) Tournament Championships: 3 (2004, 08, 25) NCAA Tournaments: 5 (1980, 2004, 08, 09, 25) Postseason Record:6–8 (.429) Best Record (1980): 47–13–1 (.779) Best in NCAA's (2009):.3–2 (.600) Players Drafted:59 (last, Gavin Perry)

=== Basketball ===
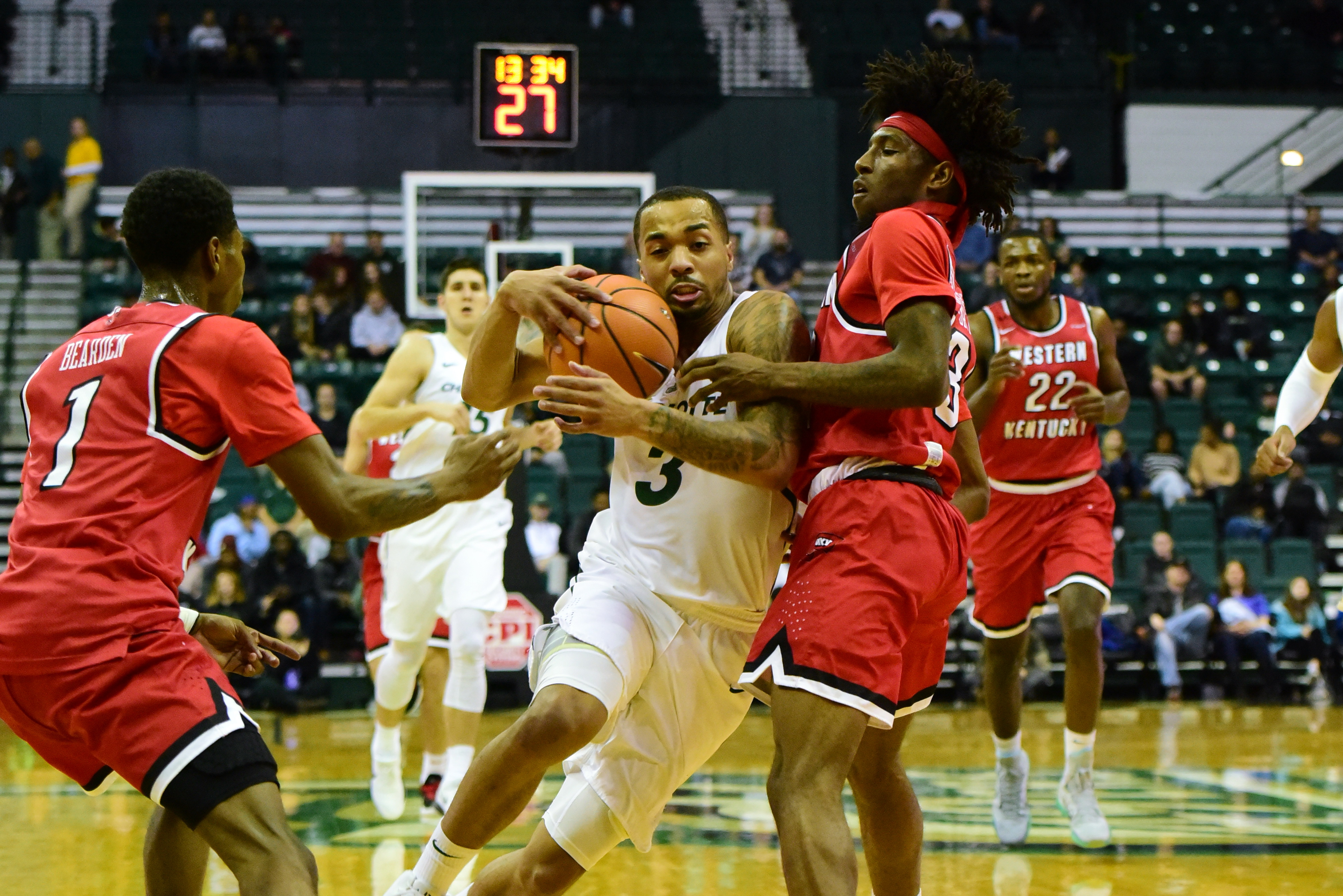
A WK men's game in 2018

The men's basketball program is nationally recognized, and one of the winningest programs in NCAA history. Hank Plona is the current head coach of the Hilltoppers. The program has over 1,600 victories, forty 20-win seasons, 38 Postseason Tournament Appearances and 28 All-Americans.

During the 1980s, Coach Paul Sanderford built Western Kentucky Lady Toppers basketball into a national power, appearing in 3 NCAA Final Fours. In recent years, the Lady Toppers have had a continued record of success; under head coach Michelle Clark-Heard, the Lady Toppers won the Conference USA title in 2015, advancing to the NCAA Women's Division I Basketball Championship tournament in 2014 and 2015, and receiving invitations to the Women's National Invitation Tournament in 2013 and 2016. Following the completion of the 2018–2019 season, Michelle Clark-Heard accepted the head coaching position at the University of Cincinnati. The current head coach of the Western Kentucky University Lady Toppers is Greg Collins.

=== Football ===
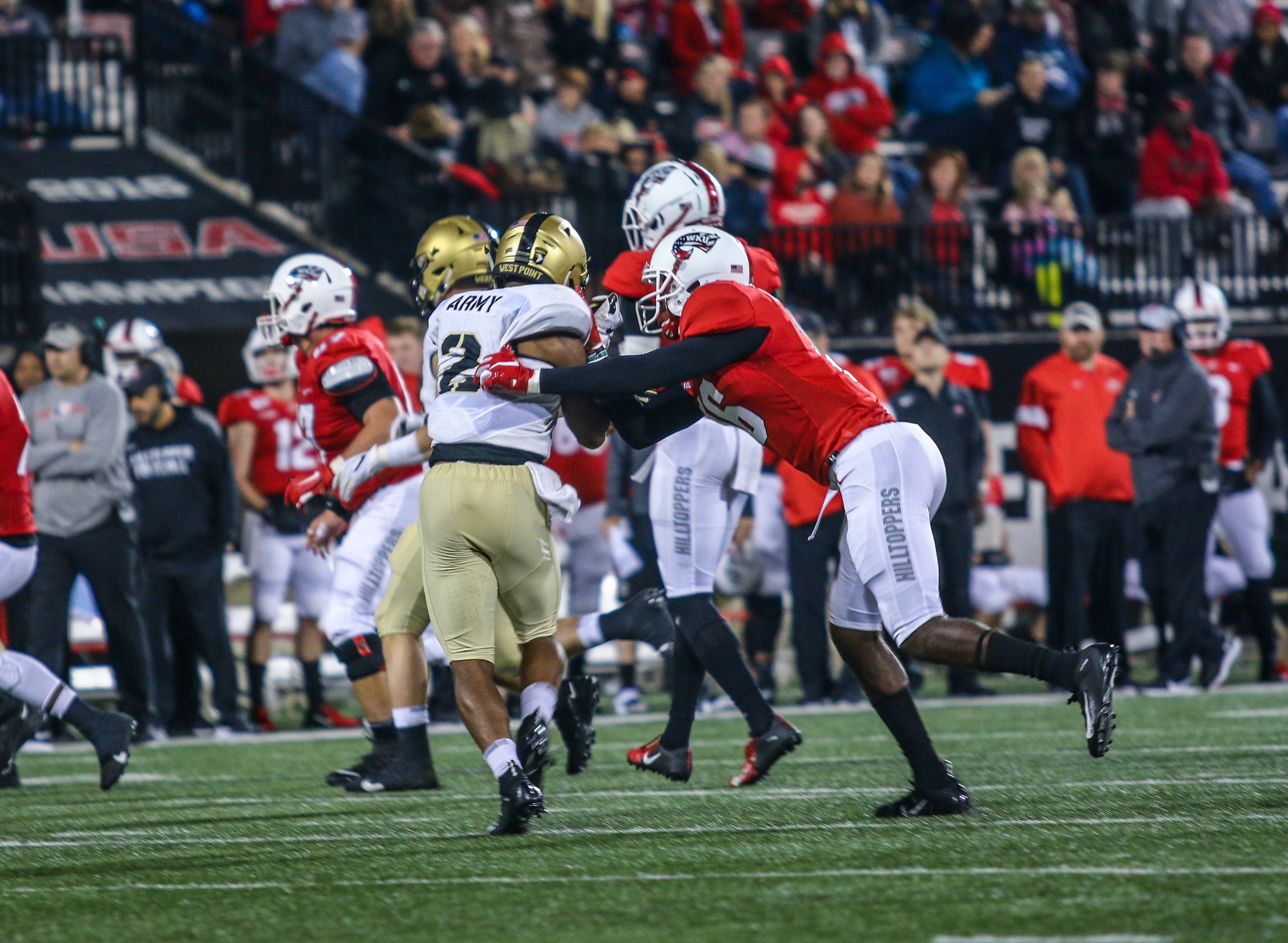
WK v Army game in October 2019

The Western Kentucky football team is currently a member of Conference USA. Previously, the school was a member of the Gateway Conference through the 2006 football season and then began its 2-year transition into becoming a full Division I FBS (formerly Division I-A) member. As a member of Division I-AA, now Division I FCS, the Hilltoppers won a Division I-AA Football Championship in 2002. In 2008, the Hilltoppers were among the Division I-A Independents, along with the Army Black Knights, Navy Midshipmen and the Notre Dame Fighting Irish. In 2009, the Hilltoppers completed the transition and joined the Sun Belt Conference. In 2015, the Hilltoppers clinched the Conference USA championship, won the Miami Beach Bowl and finished ranked 24th in the final Associated Press college football poll.

Following Jeff Brohm's departure to Purdue after back to back Conference USA Titles in 2015 & 2016, Mike Sanford Jr. was hired as his replacement. In his first season, Sanford posted a 6–7 record. His second season saw Western Kentucky finish 3–9, its worst finish since 2010. Shortly following the end of the season, Sanford was relieved of his duties as head coach.

The current head coach is Tyson Helton who came to Western Kentucky after serving one season as the offensive coordinator under Tennessee head coach Jeremy Pruitt.

=== Men's golf ===
The men's golf team has won 10 conference championships:

- Ohio Valley Conference (9): 1949, 1950, 1952, 1953, 1957, 1959, 1965, 1968, 1969
- Sun Belt Conference (1): 2006

=== Swimming ===
The men's swimming program was founded by Bill Powell in 1969. He served as the head coach for 36 seasons and retired in 2005. During his tenure, the program recorded 35 consecutive winning seasons, with Powell's first season being his only with a losing record. The program under Powell also recorded seven undefeated seasons. In 1997, a women's program was established. As head coach of this program as well, he led them to seven consecutive winning seasons and five consecutive conference championship seasons in the Sun Belt. Following Powell's retirement, Bruce Marchionda took over as the head coach for the men's and women's swimming and diving programs. Under Marchionda, the programs continued to win conference championships, and going into 2015, the men's team had won two consecutive championships in Conference USA. Under Marchionda, Claire Donahue, who won a gold medal at the 2012 Summer Olympics, competed for the university's swim team. In 2015, she was training as a postgraduate at WKU under Marchionda. Another swimmer training under Marchionda around the same time was Fabian Schwingenschlögl, who was training to compete in the NCAA Division I men's swimming and diving championships and had earned All-America honors at the university. Overall, by 2015, the men's team had won 15 conference championships, while the women's team had won nine, prompting multiple sources to describe WKU's swimming program as having a "rich history".

On April 14, 2015, WKU announced that it would suspend its men's and women's swimming and diving teams for at least 5 years, effective immediately. This followed a police investigation into claims of assault and hazing by a former men's team member which in turn found multiple violations of university policies on harassment and sexual misconduct. On June 26 2018, three years after the men's and women's swimming and diving teams had been suspended, the school canceled all funding for those programs, and in the spring of 2020 the COVID-19 pandemic stalled any efforts that might have been made to resume them.
