= Evansville Purple Aces men's soccer =

American college soccer team

- Founded: 1974; 52 years ago
- University: University of Evansville
- Head coach: Marshall Ray (3rd season)
- Conference: Missouri Valley Conference
- Location: Evansville, Indiana, US
- Stadium: McCutchan Stadium (capacity: 2,500)
- Nickname: Purple Aces
- Colors: Purple, white, and orange
Home	Away

NCAA tournament College Cup
- 1985, 1990

NCAA tournament Quarterfinals
- 1985, 1990

NCAA tournament appearances
- 1982, 1984, 1985, 1986, 1987, 1988, 1989, 1990, 1991, 1992, 1996, 2024

Conference tournament championships
- MCC: 1987, 1989, 1990, 1991, 1992; MVC: 1996, 2024

Conference regular season championships
- MCC: 1990, 1991

The Evansville Purple Aces men's soccer team represents the University of Evansville in the Missouri Valley Conference (MVC) of NCAA Division I soccer. The Purple Aces play their home matches on Black Beauty Field at Arad McCutchan Stadium on the north end of the university's campus in Evansville, Indiana. The team is currently coached by Marshall Ray.

== History ==
The program began in 1974, under head coach Bill Vieth. Since then, the Purple Aces have made the NCAA Division I Men's Soccer Tournament 11 times.

=== 1985 ===
Evansville first made the Final Four in 1985, under head coach Fred Schmalz. After going 21–1–2 in the regular season, the Purple Aces qualified for the NCAA tournament, a feat the program has accomplished twice up to this point. During the tournament, Evansville beat the likes of Indiana (3–0), and Penn State (1–0). It was UCLA who bested them in the Final Four, by a score of 3 to 1. The Bruins would eventually beat American to win the tournament.

=== 1990 ===
Still under head coach Schmalz, the program reached the NCAA tournament for the sixth year in a row. Going 24–1–2 in the regular season, the team won the MCC championship and topped the regular season standings. During the NCAA tournament, Evansville bested Boston and Indiana, both by a score of 1–0. Rutgers would go on to beat them in the Final Four, and advance to the championship, where they lost to UCLA.

== Notable players ==
Through the years, many Purple Aces have gone on to play professionally, and twelve have been named All-Americans for their play at Evansville.

=== Professional players ===
(Years in parentheses denote years playing for the Purple Aces)

- Marc Burch (2002–2004), currently plays for Memphis 901 FC
- Scott Cannon (1986–1990), last played for the Tampa Bay Mutiny in 2001
- Frank D'Amelio (1978–1979), last played for New York United in 1981; assistant coach of UNLV Rebels soccer from 1998 to 2005
- Alec Dufty (2006–2008), last played for Chicago Fire; current goalkeeper coach for Sporting Kansas City
- Cory Elenio (2004–2007), currently plays for the Syracuse Silver Knights
- Mark Anthony Gonzalez (2012–2015), last played for Reno 1868 FC in 2018
- Diego Gutiérrez (1992–1993), last played for Chicago Fire in 2008; United States national
- Michael LaBerge (1994–1996), last played for the Hershey Wildcats in 2000
- Brian Loftin (1993–1994), last played for the Milwaukee Wave in 2003; United States futsal national
- Ian McGrath (2014–2017), currently playing for Scottish Championship side Queen of the South F.C.
- Richard Menjívar (2008–2009), last played for Penn FC in 2018; current El Salvador national
- Mike Mikes (1983–1986), last played for the Colorado Foxes in 2005
- Robert Paterson (1989–1990), last played for Portland Timbers in 1990
- Troy Perkins (2003), last played for Seattle Sounders FC in 2015; 2006 MLS Goal of the Year Award winner; United States national
- David Weir (1988–1992), last played for Scottish Premier League side Rangers F.C. in 2012; Managed Sheffield United F.C. in 2013; Scotland national

=== All-Americans ===
- Shawn Beyer 1996
- Scott Cannon 1990
- Trey Harrington 1990 & 1992
- Just Jensen 1982
- Mick Lyon 1987
- Dan McHugh 1985
- Graham Merryweather 1991
- Mike Mikes 1985 & 1986
- John Nunes 1982
- Andrew Norton 1985
- Robert Paterson 1989†
- David Weir 1990

† = National Player of the Year

== Record by year ==
Record table
Season	Coach	Overall	Conference	Standing	Postseason
Evansville Purple Aces (Division I Independent) (1974–1986)
1974	Bill Vieth	3–8–0			
1975	Bill Vieth	6–6–0			
1976	Bill Vieth	3–8–0			
1977	Bob Gaudin	8–7–1			
1978	Bob Gaudin	13–6–0			
1979	Fred Schmalz	9–5–6			
1980	Fred Schmalz	12–6–3			
1981	Fred Schmalz	11–8–3			
1982	Fred Schmalz	15–3–4			NCAA 2nd round
1983	Fred Schmalz	13–5–4			
1984	Fred Schmalz	17–5–0			NCAA 2nd round
1985	Fred Schmalz	21–1–2			NCAA College Cup 3rd
1986	Fred Schmalz	17–3–2			NCAA 2nd round
Independent:		148–71–25			
Evansville Purple Aces (Midwestern Collegiate Conference) (1987–1993)
1987	Fred Schmalz	16–8–0		1st seed	NCAA 1st round
1988	Fred Schmalz	15–5–2		3rd seed	NCAA 2nd round
1989	Fred Schmalz	19–4–0	5–1–0	t-1st South	NCAA 1st round
1990	Fred Schmalz	24–1–2	8–0–0	1st	NCAA College Cup 3rd
1991	Fred Schmalz	15–5–3	5–0–1	1st	NCAA 1st round
1992	Fred Schmalz	11–9–3	4–1–2	2nd	NCAA 1st round
1993	Fred Schmalz	6–13–2	3–2–1	3rd	
MCC (Horizon League now):		103–45–12	25–4–4		
Evansville Purple Aces (Missouri Valley Conference) (1994–Present)
1994	Fred Schmalz	10–8–2	3–2–1	4th	
1995	Fred Schmalz	10–7–3	4–1–0	2nd	
1996	Fred Schmalz	18–5–0	4–1–0	2nd	NCAA 1st round
1997	Fred Schmalz	9–10–1	4–3–0	3rd	
1998	Fred Schmalz	6–14–0	2–5–0	7th	
1999	Fred Schmalz	10–9–1	3–3–1	5th	
2000	Fred Schmalz	4–10–3	3–7–1	10th	
2001	Fred Schmalz	7–10–1	4–5–0	t-5th	
2002	Fred Schmalz	7–11–2	2–7–0	t-8th	
2003	Dave Golan	9–7–3	4–4–1	6th	
2004	Dave Golan	6–13–1	4–5–1	7th	
2005	Dave Golan	2–14–1	0–7–0	8th	
2006	Mike Jacobs	9–8–0	2–4–0	5th	
2007	Mike Jacobs	10–9–1	3–3–0	3rd	
2008	Mike Jacobs	9–7–2	2–3–0	4th	
2009	Mike Jacobs	12–7–1	5–4–1	4th	
2010	Mike Jacobs	7–10–1	3–4–0	6th	
2011	Mike Jacobs	5–11–1	5–0–1	7th	
2012	Mike Jacobs	9–8–1	3–2–1	t-3rd	
2013	Mike Jacobs	10–8–1	2–4–0	6th	
2014	Mike Jacobs	6–11–1	4–2–0	3rd	
2015	Marshall Ray	3–13–0	0–6–0	7th	
2016	Marshall Ray	9–8–3	4–2–2	3rd of 7	
2017	Marshall Ray	11–8–2	3–4–1	4th of 7	
2018	Marshall Ray	4–8–7	2–2–2	5th of 7	
2019	Marshall Ray	2–15–1	0–10–0	6th of 6	
2020	Marshall Ray	0–9–1	0–7–1		
2021	Marshall Ray	4–14–2	3–6–1	4th of 6	
2022	Marshall Ray	8–5–6	3–2–3	3rd of 7	
2023	Robbe Tarver	4–8–4	2–4–2	7th of 9	
2024	Robbe Tarver	11–7–3	4–3–1	5th of 9	NCAA First round
MVC:		231–292–56	87–122–21		
Total:		478–400–89			
National champion Postseason invitational champion Conference regular season champion Conference regular season and conference tournament champion Division regular season champion Division regular season and conference tournament champion Conference tournament champion

== Current Team ==
0	Jacob Madden	GK	6–3	R-Jr.	Round Rock, Texas / Appalachian State
00	Landon Amick	GK	5–11	Fr.	Las Vegas, Nevada / Faith Lutheran HS
1	Matt Bryant	GK	6–2	R-Sr.	Indialantic, Fla. / Brevard Soccer Alliance
2	Francesco Brunetti	D	5–11	Sr.	Arezzo, Italy / University of the Southwest
3	Ethan Garvey	D	6–7	Jr.	New Orleans, La. / Holy Cross HS
4	Evan Dekker	M	6–5	Sr.	Mississauga, Ontario, Canada / Malone
5	Raphaello Perez Colasito	M	5–8	R-Sr.	Gilbert, Ariz. / Chandler-Gilbert CC
6	Johan Helander	D	6–1	Sr.	Malmö, Sweden / Lunds BK
7	Filip Johansson	D	6–0	Gr.	Malmö, Sweden / Lunds BK
8	Pablo Guillen	M	5–9	So.	La Coruna, Spain / C.D. Lugo
9	Jakub Hall	F	6–5	R-Jr.	West Lafayette, Ind. / William Henry Harrison HS
10	Leonardo Barba	F	5–9	Gr.	Midland, Texas / Adams State
11	Oliver Hald	D	6–3	So.	Copenhagen, Denmark / Muskegon CC
12	Karl Mbouombouo	F	6–0	Sr.	Paris, France / Post University
13	Ryan Harris	M	5–11	Sr.	Franklin, Tenn. / Centennial HS
14	Nkosi Graham	W	5–7	Jr.	Lumberton, N.J. / Holy Ghost Prep
15	Jon Varela	D	6–0	Fr.	Vitoria, Spain / Aurerrá Vitoria
16	Jacob Grant	W	5–7	So.	Westerville, Ohio / Club Ohio
17	Einar Andresson	D	6–2	So.	Keflavik, Iceland / Fjölbrautaskóli Suðurnesja
18	Brian Zambrano	M	5–10	Sr.	Wheeling, Ill. / Wheeling HS
19	Jose Vivas	M	5–6	Fr.	Teruel, Spain / SD Huesca
20	Davis Peck	W	5–7	R-Sr.	Gilbert, Ariz. / Grand Canyon
21	Carlos Barcia	M	6–1	Jr.	Gijon, Spain / Ohio Valley University
22	Adam Dahou	D	5–7	Jr.	Grenoble, France / Indian Hills CC
23	Edward Mendy	W	5–9	Fr.	Overland Park, Kansas / Blue Valley West HS
24	Alec McAlister	M	5–9	So.	Lancaster, Ky. / Lexington FC
25	Porter Hedenberg	M	5–10	So.	Dayton, Ky. / King's Hammer SC
26	Brock Wandel	D	6–3	Jr.	Newburgh, Ind. / Castle HS
27	Porter Pomykal	M	6–0	Fr.	Corinth, Texas / Marcus HS
28	Eyob McFarland	W	5–9	Fr.	Louisville, Ky. / Kentucky Country Day
29	Simon Paez	M	5–9	Sr.	Caracas, Venezuela / Castle HS
30	Caleb Knight	D	6–1	So.	Carterville, Ill. / St. Louis Scott Gallagher
31	Michael Adams	GK	5–11	So.	Maineville, Ohio /
32	Owen Butcher	M	6–1	Fr.	Plano, Texas / Liberty HS
