= Drake Bulldogs men's soccer =

American college soccer team

- Founded: 1986; 39 years ago
- University: Drake University
- Head coach: Pat Flinn (4th season)
- Conference: Missouri Valley
- Location: Des Moines, Iowa
- Stadium: Mediacom Stadium (Capacity: 4,000)
- Nickname: Bulldogs
- Colors: Blue and white
Home	Away

NCAA Tournament Quarterfinals
- 2009

NCAA Tournament appearances
- 2008, 2009, 2015

Conference Tournament championships
- 2009, 2015

Conference Regular Season championships
- 2025

The Drake Bulldogs men's soccer team represent Drake University in the Missouri Valley Conference of NCAA Division I soccer. The team plays its home matches at Cownie Sports Complex on the south side of Des Moines, Iowa.

== History ==
The Drake program began in 1986. Under coach Bob Wood, the Bulldogs would compile a 16–16 record over two seasons as an independent before joining the Big Central Soccer Conference for the 1988 season. After a three-year run in the BCSC saw Drake post a collective 29–25–4 record (8–7–3 in conference), the Bulldogs would join their traditional sporting conference, the Missouri Valley Conference, for the 1991 season.

Upon joining the MVC, the Bulldogs went 6–10–0 (1–2–0) in 1991 season and 6–12–2 (2–2–1) in 1992. The Bulldogs would bounce back to post three consecutive winning seasons for the first time in school history from 1993 to 1995 (including a record-best 4–2–0 mark in 1994 MVC play). During his final seasons, Wood's teams totaled a combined 14–21–1 record in 1996–1997.

For the 1998 season, Drake hired Swiss-born Canadian, 32-year-old Evansville assistant Sean Holmes. In 1998, the Bulldogs earned a 6–11–1 mark. In 1999, Drake went 4–13–1 (1–5–1).

For the 2003 season, the Bulldogs moved from the larger Drake Stadium into the more-intimate off-campus Cownie Sports Complex, and Holmes began to turn the program around, guiding the Bulldogs to a fourth-place finish in the conference, good enough to host a quarterfinal match in the conference tournament. The 2003 squad achieved the first top 25 ranking in the program's history. The 2004 squad would begin the season ranked for the first time in school history, and the 2005 season saw victories over three ranked opponents, including a win over then-sixteenth-ranked Creighton for the first time in school history.

In 2008, Holmes' Drake squad had a breakout season. Drake would win a school-record 13 matches (against 5 losses and 1 draw) and earned an NCAA Tournament berth for the first time. Drawn into the Queens, New York region of the bracket, the Bulldogs would battle hard at Saint Louis before falling on a goal just 4.1 seconds away from penalty kicks.

The 2009 season saw Holmes' team take the program to new heights. Hosting the Missouri Valley Conference tournament after finishing second in the regular season, the Bulldogs edged third-seeded Creighton, 2–1, before defeating fourth-seeded Evansville, 2–1, to win the school's first-ever conference tournament title and clinching their second consecutive College Cup appearance. In the tournament, the Bulldogs would earn their first-ever NCAA victory with a 2–1 win over Western Illinois and then stunned fourth-seeded Ohio State 1–0 to advance to the Sweet 16 In the Sweet 16, after falling behind 2–0, the Bulldogs rallied to a stunning 6–4 win at Boston College before falling in a 2–1 heartbreaker to No. 5 North Carolina in the national quarterfinals.

Hours before the start of the 2015 season, Drake announced that assistant Gareth Smith would replace 17-year head coach Holmes to become interim head coach. Smith was promoted to head coach after Drake finished third in the MVC regular season. The third seeded Bulldogs then won three consecutive matches in the conference tournament to earn the conference's automatic bid to the 2015 NCAA Division I Men's Soccer Championship. In the tournament, the Bulldogs knocked of No. 17 Kentucky 2–1 in the first round before falling to former MVC member Creighton in the second round.

== All-time record ==
=== Seasons ===
Statistics overview
Season	Coach	Overall	Conference	Standing	Postseason
Drake (Independent) (1986–1987)
1986	Bob Wood	5–10–0			
1987	Bob Wood	11–6–0			
Drake (Big Central Soccer Conference) (1988–1990)
1988	Bob Wood	10–7–4	2–2–2	5th	
1989	Bob Wood	9–10–0	2–4–0	6th	
1990	Bob Wood	10–8–4	4–1–1	3rd	
Drake (Missouri Valley Conference) (1991–present)
1991	Bob Wood	6–10–0	1–2–0	T–4th	
1992	Bob Wood	6–12–2	2–2–1	4th	
1993	Bob Wood	11–5–1	1–3–1	4th	
1994	Bob Wood	9–8–0	4–2–0	T–2nd	
1995	Bob Wood	8–5–3	1–3–1	5th	
1996	Bob Wood	6–11–0	2–3–0	4th	
1997	Bob Wood	8–10–1	2–4–1	6th	
1998	Sean Holmes	6–11–1	1–5–1	8th	
1999	Sean Holmes	4–13–1	1–5–1	7th	
2000	Sean Holmes	7–12–0	4–7–0	9th	
2001	Sean Holmes	6–10–1	1–8–0	10th	
2002	Sean Holmes	9–7–2	5–2–2	4th	
2003	Sean Holmes	10–6–3	4–3–2	5th	
2004	Sean Holmes	8–9–1	4–4–1	T–5th	
2005	Sean Holmes	9–9–2	4–2–1	T–3rd	
2006	Sean Holmes	6–7–6	2–1–3	4th	
2007	Sean Holmes	9–6–4	2–2–2	4th	
2008	Sean Holmes	13–5–1	4–1–0	2nd	NCAA First Round
2009	Sean Holmes	16–7–2	6–3–1	2nd	NCAA Elite Eight
2010	Sean Holmes	8–8–2	4–2–1	4th	
2011	Sean Holmes	11–8–1	3–3–0	4th	
2012	Sean Holmes	6–11–4	2–2–2	5th	
2013	Sean Holmes	8–8–4	3–1–2	2nd	
2014	Sean Holmes	5–11–3	3–3–0	4th	
2015	Gareth Smith	12–5–3	3–1–2	3rd	NCAA 2nd Round
2016	Gareth Smith	6–12–1	2–5–1	6th	
2017	Gareth Smith	6–11–2	2–4–2	6th	
2018	Gareth Smith	7–7–3	1–3–2	5th	
2019	Gareth Smith	8–9–1	4–5–1	4th	
2020–21	Gareth Smith	5–3–1	5–2–1	2nd	
2021	Gareth Smith	6–9–0	3–7–0	T–5th	
2022	Pat Flinn	7–4–5	5–2–1	2nd	
2023	Pat Flinn	3–10–3	1–6–1	T–8th	
2024	Pat Flinn	9–5–3	5–1–2	2nd	
Total:		309–325–85	100–111–38		
National champion Postseason invitational champion Conference regular season champion Conference regular season and conference tournament champion Division regular season champion Division regular season and conference tournament champion Conference tournament champion

== Notable former players ==
The players in bold have senior international caps.

- **(Saint Vincent and the Grenadines) Ezra Hendrickson** featured for six different Major League Soccer (MLS) clubs, was a three-time MLS Cup winner (2002, 2004, 2008), and earned 123 international appearances with Saint Vincent and the Grenadines before serving as an assistant coach with several MLS clubs
- (United States) Aaron Leventhal played for the Minnesota Thunder of the USL A-League from 1995 to 2001
- (United States) Kirk Wilson was selected in the first round of the 1999 MLS Supplemental Draft and played for the Dallas Burn of Major League Soccer and the El Paso Patriots, Rochester Raging Rhinos, and Impact de Montreal of the USL A-League and USL First Division
- (United States) Matt Nickell was selected in the first round of the 2005 MLS Supplemental Draft and made seven appearances with D.C. United from 2005 to 2006
- (United States) Jesse Baker played for the Minnesota Thunder of the USL First Division in 2006
- (United States) Corey Farabi was selected by the Kansas City Wizards in the third round of the 2006 MLS Supplemental Draft and made several reserve appearances with the club
- (United States) Chris Hamburger was selected by the Kansas City Wizards in the fourth round of the 2006 MLS Supplemental Draft
- (United States) Garrett Webb played for Capital City F.C. of the Canadian Soccer League in 2011.
- Julien Edwards played for Capital City F.C. of the Canadian Soccer League in 2011 and was called up by Guyana for World Cup qualifying
- (Albania) Besmir Bega played for KF Tirana and Partizani Tirana of the Albanian Superliga in 2008–09.
- (United States) Matt Kuhn was selected by D.C. United in the fourth round of the 2012 MLS Supplemental Draft
- (Canada) Darrin MacLeod currently plays for North Carolina FC
- (United States) Steven Enna currently plays for FC Fredericia in Denmark
