= Bradley Braves men's soccer =

American college soccer team

- Founded: 1987; 39 years ago
- University: Bradley University
- Head coach: Tim Regan (1st season)
- Conference: Missouri Valley Conference
- Location: Peoria, Illinois, US
- Stadium: Shea Stadium (capacity: 3,800)
- Nickname: Braves
- Colors: Red and white
Home	Away

NCAA tournament Quarterfinals
- 2007

NCAA tournament appearances
- 2000, 2002, 2005, 2007, 2010, 2011, 2013

Conference tournament championships
- 2007, 2010, 2013

Conference regular season championships
- 1998, 2005, 2006 (tie), 2007 (tie)

The Bradley Braves men's soccer team represents Bradley University, located in Peoria, Illinois, United States, in NCAA Division I soccer competition. They compete in the Missouri Valley Conference. The team last played in the NCAA tournament in 2013, when they advanced to the second round, defeating Northwestern before losing at California. The Braves are currently coached by Tim Regan.

== Roster ==
As of Jul 2026

Note: Flags indicate national team as defined under FIFA eligibility rules; some limited exceptions apply. Players may hold more than one non-FIFA nationality.

No.	Pos.	Nation	Player
1	GK	ESP	Marçal Salom Chandre
2	DF	USA	Anel Kafedzic
5	MF	USA	Kael Drummond
7	FW	USA	Stephen Saladin
8	MF	USA	Cohen Musschoot
16	MF	USA	Caden Frank
17	MF	USA	Ardit Abdullai
20	MF	USA	Connor Chester
26	MF	USA	Luke Knotts
27	GK	CAN	Michael Barrett

No.	Pos.	Nation	Player
30	DF	USA	Ivan Reyes
32	DF	USA	Tommy Graham
33	FW	USA	Mitch Coughlon
36	FW	USA	Franc Nmengah
37	FW	USA	Ian Ferguson
-	DF	LVA	Dāvis Bormanis
-	MF	USA	Liam Healey
-	GK	USA	Joseph Heiar
-	MF	GER	Max Manzelmann
-	FW	USA	Braden Missey

== Year-to-year records ==
Record table
Season	Coach	Overall	Conference	Standing	Postseason
Bradley Braves (Division I Independent) (1987–1990)
1987	Tim Conley	8–14–0			
1988	Tim Conley	5–15–0			
1989	Tim Conley	4–14–2			
Tim Conley:		17–43–2			
1990	Jerry Crabtree	5–15–0			
Bradley Braves (Missouri Valley Conference) (1991–1995)
1991	Jerry Crabtree	6–14–0	0–5–0	6th of 6	
1992	Jerry Crabtree	11–7–1	3–2–0	t-2nd of 6	
1993	Jerry Crabtree	8–10–2	0–4–1	6th of 6	
1994	Jerry Crabtree	3–14–2	0–6–0	7th of 7	
1995	Jerry Crabtree	3–11–4	0–4–1	6th of 6	
Jerry Crabtree:		36–71–9	3–21–2		
Bradley Braves (Missouri Valley Conference) (1996–present)
1996	Jim DeRose	7–11–0	0–5–0	6th of 6	
1997	Jim DeRose	11–8–0	1–6–0	8th of 8	
1998	Jim DeRose	14–2–2	6–1–0	1st of 8	
1999	Jim DeRose	10–10–0	3–4–0	6th of 8	
2000	Jim DeRose	15–7–2	6–4–1	4th of 12	NCAA 1st round
2001	Jim DeRose	12–7–1	6–3–0	t-3rd of 10	
2002	Jim DeRose	14–6–4	4–3–2	5th for 10	NCAA 1st round
2003	Jim DeRose	11–8–4	5–2–2	4th of 10	
2004	Jim DeRose	10–6–3	5–2–1	3rd of 10	
2005	Jim DeRose	15–6–1	5–1–1	1st of 8	NCAA 1st round
2006	Jim DeRose	8–8–4	3–1–1	t-1st of 7	
2007	Jim DeRose	16–6–4	4–0–2	1–1st of 7	NCAA Elite 8
2008	Jim DeRose	6–12–2	1–4–0	5th of 6	
2009	Jim DeRose	6–11–1	1–9–0	6th of 6	
2010	Jim DeRose	11–9–3	3–3–1	5th of 8	NCAA 1st round
2011	Jim DeRose	15–6–2	4–2–0	3rd of 7	NCAA 1st round
2012	Jim DeRose	10–6–4	3–2–1	t-3rd of 7	
2013	Jim DeRose	13–6–2	3–2–1	3rd of 7	NCAA 2nd round
2014	Jim DeRose	9–5–4	1–5–0	6th of 7	
2015	Jim DeRose	7–10–1	4–1–1	2nd of 7	
2016	Jim DeRose	2–15–3	0–7–1	7th of 7	
2017	Jim DeRose	11–7–3	4–3–1	3rd of 7	
2018	Jim DeRose	8–5–4	1–5–0	7th of 7	
2019	Jim DeRose	8–7–4	5–3–2	3rd of 6	
2020	Jim DeRose	2–7–2	1–6–1	4th of 5	
2021	Jim DeRose	5–12–1	3–7–0	T-5th of 6	
2022	Jim DeRose	5–11–3	1–6–1	7th of 7	
2023	Jim DeRose	5–6–6	1–6–1	8th of 9	
Jim DeRose:		266–220–70	84–103–21		
2024	Tim Regan	4–8–4	1–5–2	T-7th of 9	
Tim Regan:		4–8–4	1–5–2		
Total:		323–342–85			
National champion Postseason invitational champion Conference regular season champion Conference regular season and conference tournament champion Division regular season champion Division regular season and conference tournament champion Conference tournament champion
