= Missouri State Bears soccer =

American college soccer team

Missouri State Bears men's soccer
- Founded: 1981; 44 years ago
- University: Missouri State University
- Head coach: Michael Seabolt
- Conference: American
- Location: Springfield, Missouri
- Stadium: Betty & Bobby Allison South Stadium (Capacity: 1,000)
- Nickname: Bears
- Colors: Maroon and white
Home	Away

NCAA Tournament Round of 16
- 2020

NCAA Tournament Round of 32
- 2019, 2020, 2024

NCAA Tournament appearances
- 1997, 1999, 2009, 2019, 2020, 2021, 2022, 2023, 2024

Conference Tournament championships
- 1999, 2020, 2021, 2022

Conference Regular Season championships
- 1997, 1999, 2009, 2011, 2013, 2014, 2017, 2019, 2020, 2021

The Missouri State Bears men's soccer team represents Missouri State University in NCAA Division I men's soccer. Since the 2025 NCAA soccer season, the Bears have competed in the American Conference (American), following more than 30 years as a member of the Missouri Valley Conference. The team plays its home matches at Betty & Bobby Allison South Stadium. They are currently coached by Michael Seabolt, who completed his fourth season as head coach in 2025. Missouri State has made 9 NCAA tournament appearances, most recently in 2024. The Bears' overall record in the NCAA tournament is 3–9. They have won 12 conference regular-season titles and three conference tournaments. Missouri State has had 8 players selected in the MLS Draft.

== History ==
=== Conference memberships ===
For the first seven years of the program's existence, it was an independent. They switched their conference affiliation for a year in 1989 to the Association of Mid-Continent Universities (now known as the Summit League). They switched back to being an independent for the 1990 season. From 1991 to 2024, the team was a member of the Missouri Valley Conference. In May 2024, Missouri State announced it would move its athletic program to Conference USA, which sponsors soccer only for women, effective in July 2025. In October 2024, the Bears were announced as a new men's soccer associate of the American, also effective in 2025. (Note: The Bears' new conference was known at the time of announcement as the American Athletic Conference. The word "Athletic" was dropped in July 2025.)

Prior to 2005, Missouri State was known as Southwest Missouri State.

- 1981-1988: Independent
- 1989: Association of Mid-Continent Universities†
- 1990: Independent
- 1991–2024: Missouri Valley Conference†
- 2025–present: American Conference

†Founding member of the conference

== Players ==
=== Current roster ===
As of July 31, 2025

Note: Flags indicate national team as defined under FIFA eligibility rules; some limited exceptions apply. Players may hold more than one non-FIFA nationality.

No.	Pos.	Nation	Player
2	DF	ENG	Victor Wachowicz
3	DF	SCO	Harris O'Connor
5	DF	ENG	Michael Peck
6	DF	ITA	Mattia Petricca
8	MF	ENG	Kian Yari
9	FW	IRL	James Jennings
10	FW	ITA	Nicolo Mulatero
12	MF	SCO	Tyler Caton
13	MF	ENG	Jared Harlock
14	MF	ENG	Joseph Ling
15	MF	ENG	Alex Matthews
16	MF	ESP	Adrián Esteban
17	FW	JPN	Fumiya Shiraishi
18	FW	ENG	Ollie Bate
21	DF	ENG	Harry Jolley
22	MF	ITA	Daniel Verdirosi
24	MF	POR	Daniel Souza
26	MF	ITA	Pascal Corvino

No.	Pos.	Nation	Player
27	DF	GER	Lucas Freese
30	GK	USA	Will Lowry
31	GK	ENG	Jonathan Kliewer
36	MF	ESP	Diego Real
—	GK	ENG	Danny Cullum
—	GK	USA	Justin Stewart
—	DF	BRA	Gabriel Atienza
—	DF	LVA	Hugo Jinkinson
—	DF	ITA	Bruno Cellerino
—	DF	ENG	Harry Hogben
—	DF	ENG	Lucas Dawson
—	DF	ENG	Hugo Jinkinson
—	DF	JPN	Wato Matoba
—	MF	JPN	Kei Kinoshita
—	MF	ITA	Niccolò Marcellusi
—	MF	ITA	Daniele Aracri
—	MF	ESP	Alex Rodriguez
—	MF	POR	Rodrigo Ferreira
—	MF	ISL	Patrekur Gretarsson
—	MF	NOR	Petter Elimio Hassen
—	FW	DEN	Christoffer Dommer

== Facilities ==
Betty and Bobby Allison South Stadium

Missouri State plays their home matches at Betty and Bobby Allison South Stadium. The on-campus, 1,500-seat stadium was built in the summer of 2014. The stadium has a combination of bleacher and chair-back seating. The stadium features a Sport Turf artificial turf playing surface. The stadium has locker rooms for both men's and women's soccer programs. It also has a press box and Daktronics LED premier video board.

== Championships ==
=== Conference championships ===
==== Regular season ====
Missouri State has won 12 regular-season conference championships in the team's history. They won back-to-back championships twice, in 2013–2014 and 2019–2022. In 2019 the Bears finished the regular season undefeated in both conference and non-conference play. Jon Leamy coached the team for its first 10 championships, with current coach Michael Seabolt on board for the two most recent championships.

Season	Conference	Coach	Overall Record	Conference Record
1997	Missouri Valley	Jon Leamy	13-5-3	6–0–1
1999	Missouri Valley	Jon Leamy	17-1-3	6–0-1
2009	Missouri Valley	Jon Leamy	12-5–2	7-1–1
2011†	Missouri Valley	Jon Leamy	9-8-2	5-1-0
2013	Missouri Valley	Jon Leamy	11-5–2	5-1–0
2014	Missouri valley	Jon Leamy	9-5–4	4–0-2
2017	Missouri Valley	Jon Leamy	9-5-3	5-2-1
2019	Missouri Valley	Jon Leamy	18–1-1	10–0-0
2020–21	Missouri Valley	Jon Leamy	12-2-0	7-1-0
2021	Missouri Valley	Jon Leamy	17-2-0	10-0-0
2022	Missouri Valley	Michael Seabolt	12-2-4	6-0-2
2024	Missouri Valley	Michael Seabolt	12-4-2	7-0-1
Total Conference Championships:			12	
† Denotes co-champions

== NCAA tournament history ==
Missouri State has appeared in 9 NCAA tournaments, including each tournament since 2019, and has an overall record of 3–9. Missouri State won their first tournament game 2019 at home against Denver 1–0. This was the first time the program hosted a tournament game. Prior to 2005 Missouri State was known as Southwest Missouri State, making 2 appearances in 1997 and 1999. Jon Leamy coached the Bears in their first six tournament appearances, and current coach Michael Seabolt has led the Bears to three tournaments.

Season	Coach	Round	Host	Opponent	Result
1997	Jon Leamy	First round	Saint Louis	Saint Louis	L 2-1
1999	Jon Leamy	First round	UAB	UAB	L 2-1
2009	Jon Leamy	First round	Saint Louis	Saint Louis	L 2-1
2019	Jon Leamy	First round Round of 32	Missouri State; UCF	Denver; UCF	W 1-0; L 2-1 (OT)
2020–21	Jon Leamy	Round of 32; Round of 16	UNCW; Cary, NC	Maryland; Washington	W 2-1; L 2-0 (OT)
2021	Jon Leamy	First round	Missouri State	Creighton	L 1-0
2022	Michael Seabolt	First round	Creighton	Creighton	L 2-1
2023	Michael Seabolt	First round Round of 32	Missouri State; Stanford	Omaha; Stanford	W 1-0; L 3-1
2024	Michael Seabolt	Second round	Missouri State	Kansas City	L 2-1

Last updated: January 6, 2025.
Source: NCAA Soccer

== Yearly results ==
Missouri State's first season was in 1981 where they went 4-6-1 under head coach Frank Dinka. From the inaugural season in 1981 to the end of the 2004 season Missouri State was known as Southwest Missouri State. The school changed their name to Missouri State in 2005 and since then has been known as Missouri State. The Bears were an independent until 1988 when they joined what is now the Summit League for a year. After a lone season as an independent again, Missouri State joined the Missouri Valley Conference. They remained members of the MVC through the 2024 season, after which they will join the American Athletic Conference. They made their first NCAA Tournament appearance in 1997 when they lost to Saint Louis University in the first round 2–1. The Bears have appeared 3 more times since then, most recently in 2019 where they reached the round of 32. 2019 was also Missouri State's most successful season as they went 18-1-1 and went an undefeated 10-0-0 in conference play and 16-0-0 during the regular season.

Statistics overview
Season	Coach	Overall	Conference	Standing	Postseason
Southwest Missouri State Bears (Independent) (1981–1988)
1981	Frank Dinka	4–6–1			
1982	Frank Dinka	5–10–2			
1983	Frank Dinka	3–12–1			
1984	Frank Dinka	6–11–0			
1985	Frank Dinka	7–10–2			
1986	Frank Dinka	8–11–0			
1987	Jan Stahle	9–10–1			
1988	Jan Stahle	9–12–1			
Southwest Missouri State Bears (AMCU) (1989–only)
1989	Jan Stahle	14–8–3	3–3–0	4th	
Southwest Missouri State Bears (Independent) (1990–only)
1990	Tom Howe	8–8–1			
Southwest Missouri State Bears (Missouri Valley Conference) (1991–2004)
1991	Tom Howe	9–10–0	1–2–0	t-4th	
1992	Jon Leamy	4–15–0	0–5–0	6th	
1993	Jon Leamy	9–9–0	1–4–0	5th	
1994	Jon Leamy	12–5–1	1–4–1	6th	
1995	Jon Leamy	14–5–0	2–3–0	4th	
1996	Jon Leamy	12–6–0	3–2–0	3rd	
1997	Jon Leamy	13–5–3	6–0–1	1st	NCAA 1st round
1998	Jon Leamy	13–7–1	3–3–1	t-4th	
1999	Jon Leamy	17–1–3	5–0–2	1st	NCAA 1st round
2000	Jon Leamy	10–7–2	4–5–2	8th	
2001	Jon Leamy	10–9–1	7–2–0	2nd	
2002	Jon Leamy	9–11–0	6–3–0	3rd	
2003	Jon Leamy	9–7–3	3–5–1	8th	
2004	Jon Leamy	11–6–2	4–4–1	t-5th	
Missouri State Bears (Missouri Valley Conference) (2005–2024)
2005	Jon Leamy	12–4–2	4–3–0	5th	
2006	Jon Leamy	8–8–3	3–2–1	3rd	
2007	Jon Leamy	6–10–4	1–3–2	6th	
2008	Jon Leamy	7–10–5	3–1–1	3rd	
2009	Jon Leamy	12–5–2	7–1–1	1st	NCAA 1st round
2010	Jon Leamy	8–7–3	4–1–2	t-2nd	
2011	Jon Leamy	9–8–2	5–1–0	t-1st	
2012	Jon Leamy	5–8–4	0–6–0	7th	
2013	Jon Leamy	11–5–2	5–1–0	1st	
2014	Jon Leamy	9–5–4	4–0–2	1st	
2015	Jon Leamy	6–6–5	3–2–1	4th of 7	
2016	Jon Leamy	9–8–2	3–4–1	5th of 7	
2017	Jon Leamy	9–5–3	5–2–1	1st	
2018	Jon Leamy	9–2–6	2–2–2	4th of 7	
2019	Jon Leamy	18–1–1	10–0–0	1st	NCAA Round of 32
2020–21	Jon Leamy	12–2–0	7–1–0	1st	NCAA Round of 16
2021	Jon Leamy	17–2–0	10–0–0	1st	NCAA 1st round
2022	Michael Seabolt	12–2–4	6–0–2	1st	NCAA 1st round
2023	Michael Seabolt	12–4–3	6–1–1	2nd	NCAA Round of 32
2024	Michael Seabolt	12–4–2	7–0–1	1st	NCAA Round of 32
MVC:		330–261–64	131–65–23		
Missouri State Bears (American Conference) (2025–present)
2025	Michael Seabolt	6–6–4	3–3–2	T–5th	
American:		6–6–4	3–3–2		
Total:		409–366–76			
National champion Postseason invitational champion Conference regular season champion Conference regular season and conference tournament champion Division regular season champion Division regular season and conference tournament champion Conference tournament champion

== MLS Draft History ==
Missouri State has had several alumni drafted by Major League Soccer clubs in the various MLS drafts.

=== MLS College Draft ===
Missouri State has had 1 player drafted in the MLS College Draft. Matt Caution was drafted in the third round of the 1998 Draft by the Dallas Burn, now known as FC Dallas.

Player	Position	Year	Draft Round	Team
Matt Caution	FW	1998	3	Dallas Burn

_{Note: The MLS College Draft was held from 1996 to 1999.}

Last updated: August 21, 2020.
Source: Soccer America

=== MLS Supplemental Draft ===
Missouri State has had 2 players drafted in the MLS Supplemental Draft. Doug Lascody was drafted in the third round of the 2005 Draft by the Kansas City Wizards, now known as Sporting Kansas City. Justin Douglass was drafted in the fourth round of the 2007 Draft by the Houston Dynamo.

Player	Position	Year	Draft Round	Team
Doug Lascody	MF	2005	3	Kansas City Wizards
Justin Douglass	DF	2007	4	Houston Dynamo

_{Note: The MLS Supplemental Draft has been held off and on since 1996. The last draft to have taken place was in 2013.}

Last updated: August 21, 2020.
Source: Major League Soccer

Source: Major League Soccer

=== MLS SuperDraft ===
Missouri State has had 5 players drafted in the MLS SuperDraft. Chris Brunt was drafted in the third round of the 2002 draft by the then-Kansas City Wizards. Missouri State had two players selected in the 2004 Draft; Matt Pickens in the second round with the Chicago Fire and Jamal Sutton in the fourth round with the Columbus Crew. Matthew Bentley was selected in the fourth round of the 2020 draft by Minnesota United FC. Jesús Barea was selected in the first round of the 2025 MLS SuperDraft by Real Salt Lake.

Player	Position	Year	Draft Round	Team
Chris Brunt	DF	2002	3	Kansas City Wizards
Matt Pickens	GK	2004	2	Chicago Fire
Jamal Sutton	FW	2004	4	Columbus Crew
Matthew Bentley	FW	2020	4	Minnesota United FC
Jesús Barea	FW	2025	1	Real Salt Lake

Last updated: June 16, 2025.
Source: Major League Soccer
