= 1974 NAIA soccer championship =

1974 NAIA Soccer Championship

Tournament details
- Country: United States
- Venue: Florissant, Missouri
- Teams: 8

Final positions
- Champions: Quincy (IL) (5th title)
- Runners-up: Davis & Elkins
- Third place: Benedictine (KS)
- Fourth place: Erskine

Tournament statistics
- Matches played: 12
- Goals scored: 52 (4.33 per match)

Awards
- Best player: Jim Pollihan, Quincy (IL)

The 1974 NAIA Soccer Championship was the 16th annual tournament held by the NAIA to determine the national champion of men's college soccer among its members in the United States.

Defending champions Quincy (IL) defeated Davis & Elkins in the final, 6–0, to claim the Hawks' fifth NAIA national title. This was a rematch of the 1968, 1970, and 1971 championships.

The final was played in Florissant, Missouri.

== Qualification ==
For the fourth year, the tournament field remained fixed at eight teams. Unlike the previous three years, however, additional fifth- and seventh-place finals were not contested.

Qualified Teams
School	Appearance	Last Bid
Benedictine (KS)	1st	Never
Cedarville	1st	Mever
Davis & Elkins	7th	1973
Erskine	4th	1973
George Mason	1st	Never
Keene State	3rd	1972
Quincy (IL)	8th	1973
Westmont	6th	1972

== Bracket ==
Fifth place
Keene State	6
Cedarville	1
Seventh place
Westmont	6*
George Mason	4

Consolation semifinals
Westmont	0
Keene State	1
Cedarville	3
George Mason	0

First round
Davis & Elkins	2
Westmont	1
Benedictine (KS)	1
Keene State	0
Erskine	1
Cedarville	0
Quincy (IL)	8
George Mason	1

Championship semifinals
Davis & Elkins	1
Benedictine (KS)	0
Erskine	1
Quincy (IL)	6

Championship
Florissant, MO
Davis & Elkins	0
Quincy (IL)	6
Third place
Benedictine (KS)	2
Erskine	1

== See also ==
- 1974 NCAA Division I soccer tournament
- 1974 NCAA Division II soccer tournament
- 1974 NCAA Division III soccer tournament
