= 1973 NAIA soccer championship =

1973 NAIA Soccer Championship

Tournament details
- Country: United States
- Venue: Florissant, Missouri
- Teams: 8

Final positions
- Champions: Quincy (IL) (4th title)
- Runners-up: Rockhurst
- Third place: Davis & Elkins
- Fourth place: Erskine

Tournament statistics
- Matches played: 12
- Goals scored: 63 (5.25 per match)

Awards
- Best player: Mickey Whelan, Davis & Elkins

The 1973 NAIA Soccer Championship was the 15th annual tournament held by the NAIA to determine the national champion of men's college soccer among its members in the United States.

Quincy (IL) defeated Rockhurst in the final, 3–0, to claim the Hawks' fourth NAIA national title.

The final was played in Florissant, Missouri.

== Qualification ==
For the fourth year, the tournament field remained fixed at eight teams. Unlike the previous three years, however, additional fifth- and seventh-place finals were not contested.

Qualified Teams
School	Appearance	Last Bid
Davis & Elkins	6th	1972
Eastern Connecticut	3rd	1969
Erskine	3rd	1972
Goshen	2nd	1971
Newark Engineering	4th	1971
Pomona Pitzer	1st	Never
Quincy (IL)	7th	1972
Rockhurst	4th	1968

== Bracket ==
Fifth place
Pomona-Pitzer	5
Goshen	7*
Seventh place
Eastern Connecticut	1
Newark Engineering	0

Consolation semifinals
Pomona-Pitzer	4
Eastern Connecticut	1
Goshen	6*
Newark Engineering	4

First round
Erskine	1
Pomona-Pitzer	0
Rockhurst	2
Eastern Connecticut	0
Davis & Elkins	7
Goshen	0
Quincy (IL)	7
Newark Engineering	1

Championship semifinals
Erskine	0
Rockhurst	4
Davis & Elkins	1
Quincy (IL)	4

Championship
Rockhurst	0
Quincy (IL)	3
Third place
Erskine	1
Davis & Elkins	4

== See also ==
- 1973 NCAA Division I soccer tournament
- 1973 NCAA Division II soccer tournament
