= Tony Brottem =

American baseball player (1891–1929)

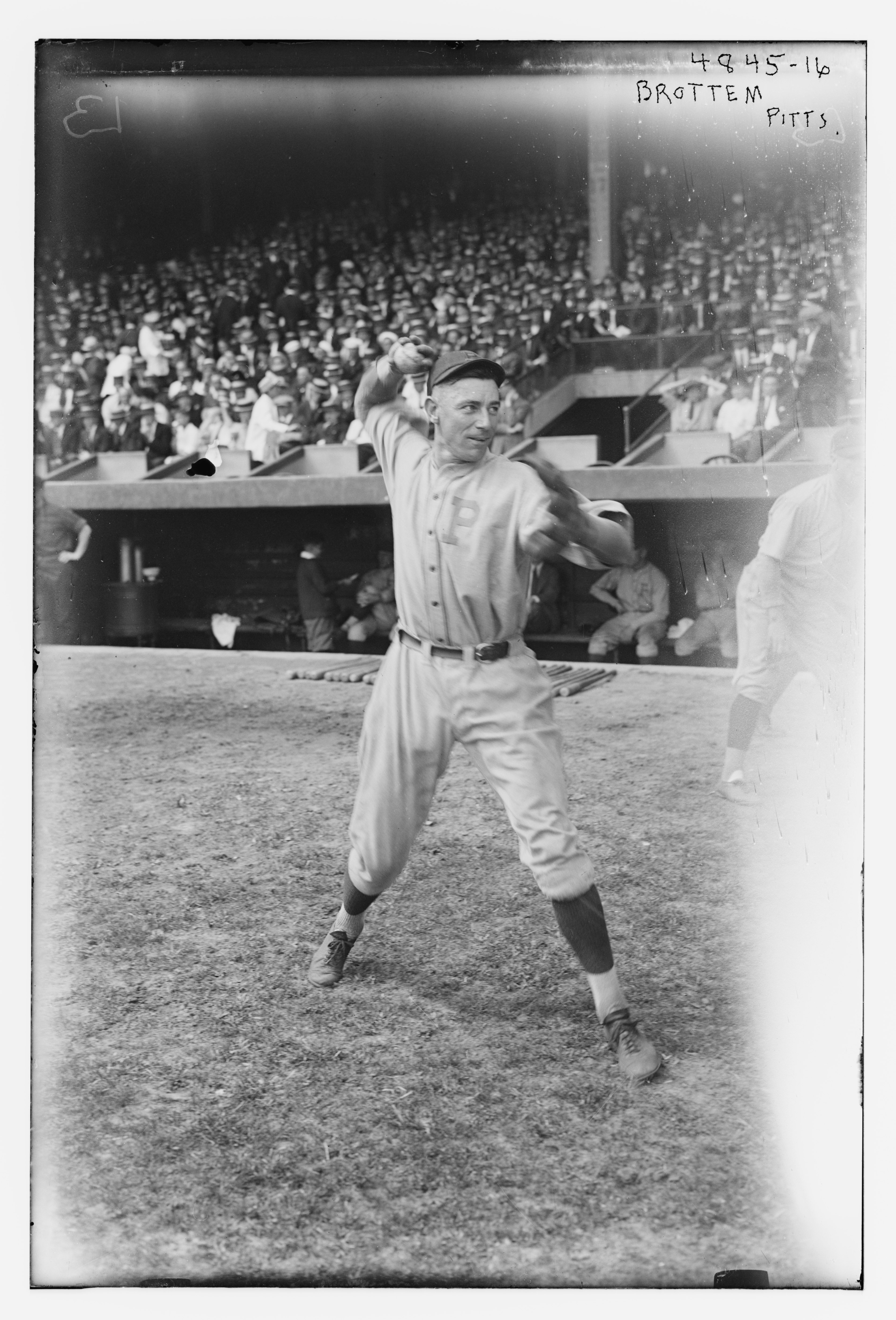
- Catcher
- Born: April 30, 1891; Halstad, Minnesota, U.S.
- Died: August 5, 1929 (aged 38); Chicago, Illinois, U.S.
- Batted: Right Threw: Right

MLB debut
- April 17, 1916, for the St. Louis Cardinals

Last MLB appearance
- September 29, 1921, for the Pittsburgh Pirates

MLB statistics
- Batting average: .215
- Home runs: 0
- Runs batted in: 13
- Stats at Baseball Reference

Teams
- St. Louis Cardinals (1916, 1918); Washington Senators (1921); Pittsburgh Pirates (1921)

Anton Christian "Tony" Brottem (April 30, 1891 – August 5, 1929) was born on the family farm in the northwest corner of Hendrum Township, Norman County, MN, a few miles southeast of Halstad, MN. His father, John Olson Brottem, was an immigrant from Trondheim, Norway, who homesteaded in rural Minnesota in the 1870s. Tony was the youngest of 7 siblings. At a young age his father moved the family to Washington state where Tony blossomed into a Major League Baseball player. In primary school at Pacific Lutheran Academy(now Pacific Lutheran University) he was a standout athlete in basketball and baseball. He was noted to have been the primary catcher for Oscar Harstad who also rose up and played in the majors. Oscar's father, Bjug Harstad, founded Pacific Lutheran Academy after doing missionary work in Minnesota and the Dakota territories while the Brottem's lived in that area.

From 1913 to 1915, Tony played pro ball for three different teams in the Class-B Northwestern League, Victoria, Tacoma, and Vancouver. His season at Vancouver in 1915 was strong; Tony played in 128 games, slugging .429, with 6 Home Runs, and a .283 batting average. This got him the call, and he joined the St. Louis Cardinals in 1916. Playing sporadically as the backup catcher, Tony was on the big league roster the whole season, but only appeared in 26 games and had a .250 OBP. 1917 saw Tony back in the minors, playing 127 games with Omaha of the Class-A Western League. Most of the 1918 season was spent with Little Rock of the Class-A Southern Association, but he returned to the Cardinals in July for two more big league games, including his first career start. That season was shortened significantly in the minors and a month was taken off in the majors due to WWI. Tony was the starting catcher on a strong Little Rock Travelers team from 1918 to 1920 in the Class-A Southern Association. Winning the league pennant in 1920. The Pirates purchased his contract on September 8, 1920, but he didn't report that fall because Little Rock was in a pennant race. By 1921 he was back in the majors with the Washington Senators. Mid season he was traded to the Pittsburgh Pirates for cash considerations. Tony played in 30 games in the last half of the season for the Bucs, getting 22 hits in 91 at bats, good for a .242 batting average. August 5, 1921, Tony was the Bucs starting catcher in the first baseball game ever broadcast over commercial radio, Pirates vs. Phillies. Tony was 2–4 with an RBI and threw out 2 base stealers. His time with the Pirates ended on October 15, 1921, when he was released back to Little Rock after the Pirates acquired catcher Bubber Jonnard. Even though the Pirates finished in 2nd place in the NL (behind the World Series winning New York Giants) in 1921, the rules of the day gave them a share of the World Series Gate receipts. Tony received a full players share. After being released to Little Rock, he moved up a level to join Louisville of the American Association for the 1922 season. That league was Double-A, which was the top level of the minors at the time. His next 4 seasons were spent playing under manager Joe McCarthy, who would go on to manage the powerhouse Yankee teams of the 1930s–40s (and was elected to the baseball hall of fame in 1957).

After being released by Louisville after just 20 games in 1925, Tony joined Rochester of the International League. He became a player-manager for a semi-pro team in 1926, but he was fired early in the season and saw sporadic action on various Midwest teams until joining Dayton Aviators of the Class-B Central League for his final season in 1929. Just two weeks after being released from the Aviators, and believing his baseball career was over, he committed suicide by slashing his own throat on August 5, 1929, in Chicago, Illinois. The coroner was able to identify the deceased as Brottem with the assistance of MLB umpire Charley Moran. He was 38 years old. He is buried in the family plot in Parkland Lutheran Cemetery in Tacoma, Washington.

Brottem played primarily as a catcher throughout his career; he batted and threw right-handed. Of his 62 total MLB games played, he is credited with catching both ends of a double header three times.
