= C. Stephen Layman =

C. Stephen Layman is an American philosopher and Professor Emeritus of Philosophy at Seattle Pacific University. His academic work focuses on philosophy of religion, ethics, and logic. Layman is known for his contributions to debates on the existence of God, moral philosophy, and Christian philosophical theology, as well as for writing an introductory text in logic.

== Education ==
Layman completed his undergraduate studies at Calvin University in 1977. He later pursued graduate studies in philosophy at the University of California, Los Angeles, where he earned his Ph.D. in 1983.

During his graduate studies, Layman received several fellowships, including the Chancellor's Intern Fellowship, and the Chancellor's Dissertation Fellowship, as well as the Charlotte W. Newcombe Doctoral Dissertation Fellowship

== Career ==
=== Early academic career ===
Following the completion of his doctoral degree, Layman served as a Visiting Lecturer at the University of California, Los Angeles (1983–1984) and as a Visiting assistant professor at Reed College (1984–1985). He subsequently held a postdoctoral fellowship at the University of Notre Dame (1985–1986), affiliated with the Center for the Philosophy of Religion.

=== Seattle Pacific University ===
Layman joined Seattle Pacific University in 1986 as an assistant professor of philosophy. He was promoted to associate professor in 1991 and to full Professor in 1996, a position he held until 2016. At Seattle Pacific University, Layman taught a wide range of courses, including:

- Introduction to Philosophy
- Introduction to Logic and Advanced Logic
- Ethical Theory and Social Ethics
- Philosophy of Religion
- Philosophical Theology
- Epistemology

== Publications ==
=== Books ===
Layman is the author of several books including:

- The Shape of the Good (University of Notre Dame Press, 1991; paperback 1994)
- The Power of Logic (Mayfield Publishing, 1999; 2nd ed. McGraw-Hill, 2002; 3rd ed. McGraw-Hill, 2005)
- Letters to Doubting Thomas: A Case for the Existence of God (Oxford University Press, 2007)
- Philosophical Approaches to Atonement, Incarnation, and the Trinity (Palgrave Macmillan, 2016)
- God: Eight Enduring Questions (University of Notre Dame Press, 2022)
- The Gray Man and Other Stories (Wipf and Stock, 2023)
- Is the Bible the Word of God (Wipf and Stock, 2025)

=== Selected Articles and chapters ===
Layman's noteworthy chapters and articles include:

- “The Truth in ‘The Will to Believe’” (History of Philosophy Quarterly, 1987)
- “Tritheism and the Trinity” (Faith and Philosophy, 1988)
- “Faith Has Its Reasons,” in Thomas V. Morris, ed., God and the Philosophers (Oxford University Press, 1994).
- “God and the Moral Order” (Faith and Philosophy, 2002)
- “Moral Evil: The Comparative Response” (International Journal for the Philosophy of Religion, 2003)
- “Natural Evil: The Comparative Response” (International Journal for the Philosophy of Religion, 2003)
- “A Moral Argument for the Existence of God” in Is Goodness Without God Good Enough? (2009)
- “The Problem of Pain in the Philosophy of Religion” in The Routledge Handbook of Philosophy of Pain (2017)

== Awards and recognition ==
- Layman has received several academic honors and awards, including:
- Chancellor's Intern Fellowship, UCLA (1977–1978)
- Chancellor's Dissertation Fellowship, UCLA (1982)
- Charlotte W. Newcombe Doctoral Dissertation Fellowship (1982–1983)
- Postdoctoral Fellowship, Center for the Philosophy of Religion, University of Notre Dame (1985–1986)
- President's Citation for Excellence, Seattle Pacific University (1998)
- Winifred E. Weter Award for Meritorious Scholarship, Seattle Pacific University (2014)
- Faculty Servant Award, Seattle Pacific University (2016)
