= Northwest Collegiate Rowing Conference =

The Northwest Collegiate Rowing Conference (NCRC) consists of seven NCAA Division II and III member schools in USRowing's Northwest region. Its mission is to provide for the advancement of small college and university rowing within the Pacific Northwest primarily through the organization and administration of a championship regatta. This conference no longer exists.

== Eligibility ==
The only eligibility requirements for membership is that the program be located within USRowing's northwest region, and that member programs be from NCAA Division II or Division III programs. In addition, each program must maintain a commitment to the constitution and bylaws. Member programs may be either varsity or club status within their respective institutional setting.

== Members ==
School	Location	Oar Design
Humboldt State University	Arcata, California	
Lewis & Clark College	Portland, Oregon	Lewis & Clark College
Pacific Lutheran University	Tacoma, Washington	Pacific Lutheran University
University of Puget Sound	Tacoma, Washington	
Seattle Pacific University	Seattle, Washington	
Western Washington University	Bellingham, Washington	
Willamette University	Salem, Oregon	Willamette University

== Regattas ==
The Conference hosts two major regattas each year. The NCRC Invite takes place during late-March on Vancouver Lake, Washington and has welcomed non-conference members from California, Oregon, and Washington. Conference championships are annually held the third weekend of April at the Cascade Sprints Regatta on Lake Stevens, Washington.

== Conference Champions ==
Each year the Conference Champion is recognized based on team points received at the Championship Regatta at Lake Stevens WA or Dexter Lake OR.

Past Conference Champions
Year	Men	Women
2000		Willamette University
2001	Puget Sound	Pacific Lutheran
2002	Puget Sound	Puget Sound
2003	Puget Sound	Puget Sound
2004	Puget Sound	Puget Sound
2005	Puget Sound	Western Washington
2006	Western Washington	Western Washington
2007	Lewis & Clark	Western Washington
2008	Puget Sound	Western Washington
2009	Puget Sound	Western Washington
2010	Lewis & Clark	Western Washington
2011	Lewis & Clark	Western Washington
2012	Western Washington	Humboldt State University
2013	Western Washington	Western Washington
2014	Puget Sound	Humboldt State University

== See also ==
- College rowing
