= Richard Hamill =

American football and basketball coach

Biographical details
- Born: September 9, 1894; Elkins, West Virginia, U.S.
- Died: December 7, 1975 (aged 71); Fredericksburg, Virginia, U.S.
- Education: Davis & Elkins (1916)

Coaching career (HC unless noted)

Football
- 1919: Glenville State
- 1920–1921: Davis & Elkins
- 1922–1923: Fairmont State

Basketball
- 1916–1917: Glenville State
- 1918–1923: Davis & Elkins

Richard Fairfax Hamill (September 9, 1894 – December 7, 1975) was an American football and basketball coach. He served as the head football coach (1920–1921) and head basketball coach (1918–1923) at his alma mater, Davis & Elkins College in Elkins, West Virginia.

He also served as the head football coach (1919) and head men's basketball coach (1916–1917) at Glenville State College, as well as serving as the head football coach at Fairmont State College from 1922 to 1923.
