= 1969 NAIA soccer championship =

1969 NAIA Soccer Championship

Tournament details
- Country: United States
- Venue(s): Earlham College; Richmond, Indiana
- Teams: 8

Final positions
- Champions: Eastern Illinois (1st title)
- Runners-up: Davis & Elkins
- Third place: Drew
- Fourth place: Spring Arbor

Tournament statistics
- Matches played: 12
- Goals scored: 40 (3.33 per match)

Awards
- Best player: William Smyth, Davis & Elkins

The 1969 NAIA Soccer Championship was the 11th annual tournament held by the NAIA to determine the national champion of men's college soccer among its members in the United States.

Eastern Illinois defeated defending champions Davis & Elkins in the final, 1–0 after two overtime periods, to claim the Panthers' first NAIA national title.

The final was played at Earlham College in Richmond, Indiana.

== Qualification ==
The tournament field remained fixed at eight teams.

Qualified Teams
School	Appearance	Last Bid
Campbell	1st	Never
Davis & Elkins	2nd	1968
Drew	1st	Never
Eastern Connecticut	2nd	1968
Eastern Illinois	1st	Never
Ottawa (KS)	1st	Never
Spring Arbor	1st	Never
Westmont	2nd	1968

== Bracket ==
Fifth place
Campbell	2
Ottawa (KS)	1
Seventh place
Westmont	0
Eastern Connecticut	4

Consolation semifinals
Campbell	2
Westmont	1
Ottawa (KS)	3
Eastern Connecticut	0

First round
Eastern Illinois	4
Campbell	0
Drew	2
Westmont	1
Davis & Elkins	1
Ottawa (KS)	0
Spring Arbor	1******
Eastern Connecticut	0

Championship semifinals
Eastern Illinois	6
Drew	0
Davis & Elkins	4
Spring Arbor	0

Championship
Eastern Illinois	1**
Davis & Elkins	0
Third place
Drew	4
Spring Arbor	3

== See also ==
- 1969 NCAA soccer tournament
