= 1973 NCAA Division II soccer tournament =

Tournament details
- Country: United States
- Teams: 25

Final positions
- Champions: UMSL (1st title)
- Runners-up: Cal State Fullerton (1st title game)
- Third place: Adelphi

Tournament statistics
- Matches played: 24
- Goals scored: 78 (3.25 per match)

The 1973 NCAA Division II soccer tournament was the second annual tournament held by the NCAA to determine the top men's Division II college soccer program in the United States. It was also the first to be branded as the "Division II" tournament, following the NCAA splitting its former College Division to create Divisions II and III. However, this tournament continued to feature D-III schools, as the NCAA did not establish a separate D-III championship until 1974.

UMSL defeated Cal State Fullerton in the final match, 3–0, to win their first national title. The final was played in Springfield, Massachusetts at Springfield College on December 8, 1973.

== Bracket ==
First round
Springfield	2
Westfield State	0
Babson	2(OT)
Hartford	1
Adelphi	4
Merchant Marine	0
Albany (NY)	1
Binghamton	2(OT)
Western Illinois	3
Wooster	1
Baltimore	3
Washington College	1
Loyola Maryland	3
Rollins	0
East Stroudsburg State	2
Lock Haven State	0
Elizabethtown	4
Muhlenberg	1

Second round
Springfield	4
Babson	0
Adelphi	3
Binghamton	0
UMSL	3
Western Illinois	1
MacMurray	0
Eastern Illinois	2
Baltimore	6
Loyola Maryland	1
East Stroudsburg State	1(2OT)
Elizabethtown	0
Cal State Fullerton	3
UC Davis	1
Seattle Pacific	1
Westmont	3

Quarterfinals
Springfield	0
Adelphi	1
UMSL	2
Eastern Illinois	1
Baltimore	6
East Stroudsburg State	3
Cal State Fullerton	1
Westmont	0

Semifinals
Adelphi	0
UMSL	1
Baltimore	0
Cal State Fullerton	1

Championship
UMSL	3
Cal State Fullerton	0

== Final ==
December 8, 1973

Missouri–Saint Louis	3–0	Cal State Fullerton
Kevin Missey 40:14' (Flemming), 79:50'; Mark LeGrand 43:20'	Report

Benedum Field, Springfield, Massachusetts
Attendance: 2,241

== See also ==
- 1973 NCAA Division I Soccer Tournament
- 1973 NAIA Soccer Championship
