= 1972 NAIA soccer championship =

1972 NAIA Soccer Championship

Tournament details
- Country: United States
- Venue: Dunn, North Carolina
- Teams: 8

Final positions
- Champions: Westmont (1st title)
- Runners-up: Davis & Elkins
- Third place: Quincy (IL)
- Fourth place: Keene State

Tournament statistics
- Matches played: 12
- Goals scored: 47 (3.92 per match)

Awards
- Best player: Gary Allison, Westmont

The 1972 NAIA Soccer Championship was the 14th annual tournament held by the NAIA to determine the national champion of men's college soccer among its members in the United States.

Westmont defeated Davis & Elkins in the final, 2–1, to claim the Warriors' first NAIA national title. Davis & Elkins would later forfeit their second-place finish after it was determined they fielded an ineligible player.

For the third consecutive year, the final was played in Dunn, North Carolina.

== Qualification ==
For the fourth year, the tournament field remained fixed at eight teams. Unlike the previous three years, however, additional fifth- and seventh-place finals were not contested.

Qualified Teams
| School | Appearance | Last Bid |
|---|---|---|
| Davis & Elkins | 5th | 1971 |
| Earlham | 5th | 1970 |
| Erskine | 2nd | 1971 |
| Fredonia State | 1st | Never |
| Harris Teachers | 1st | Never |
| Keene State | 2nd | 1971 |
| Quincy (IL) | 6th | 1971 |
| Westmont | 5th | 1971 |

== Bracket ==
Fifth place
Harris Teachers | 4
Fredonia State | 1
Seventh place
Earlham | 2
Erskine | 0

Consolation semifinals
Harris Teachers | 4
Earlham | 1
Fredonia State | 5
Erskine | 3

First round
Keene State | 1
Harris Teachers | 0
Davis & Elkins | 8
Earlham | 0
Westmont | 3
Fredonia State | 0
Quincy (IL) | 2
Erskine | 0

Championship semifinals
Keene State | 0
Davis & Elkins | 3
Westmont | 2
Quincy (IL) | 0

Championship
Dunn, NC
Davis & Elkins | 1
Westmont | 2
Third place
Keene State | 1
Quincy (IL) | 4

- Davis & Elkins forfeited their second place finish due to an ineligible player.

== See also ==
- 1972 NCAA University Division soccer tournament
- 1972 NCAA College Division soccer tournament
