= Nils Joseph Hong =

Nils Joseph Hong (7 February 1866 – 1939) was a teacher of Norwegian descent. He was president of the Pacific Lutheran Academy 1898–1918.

== Early life and education ==
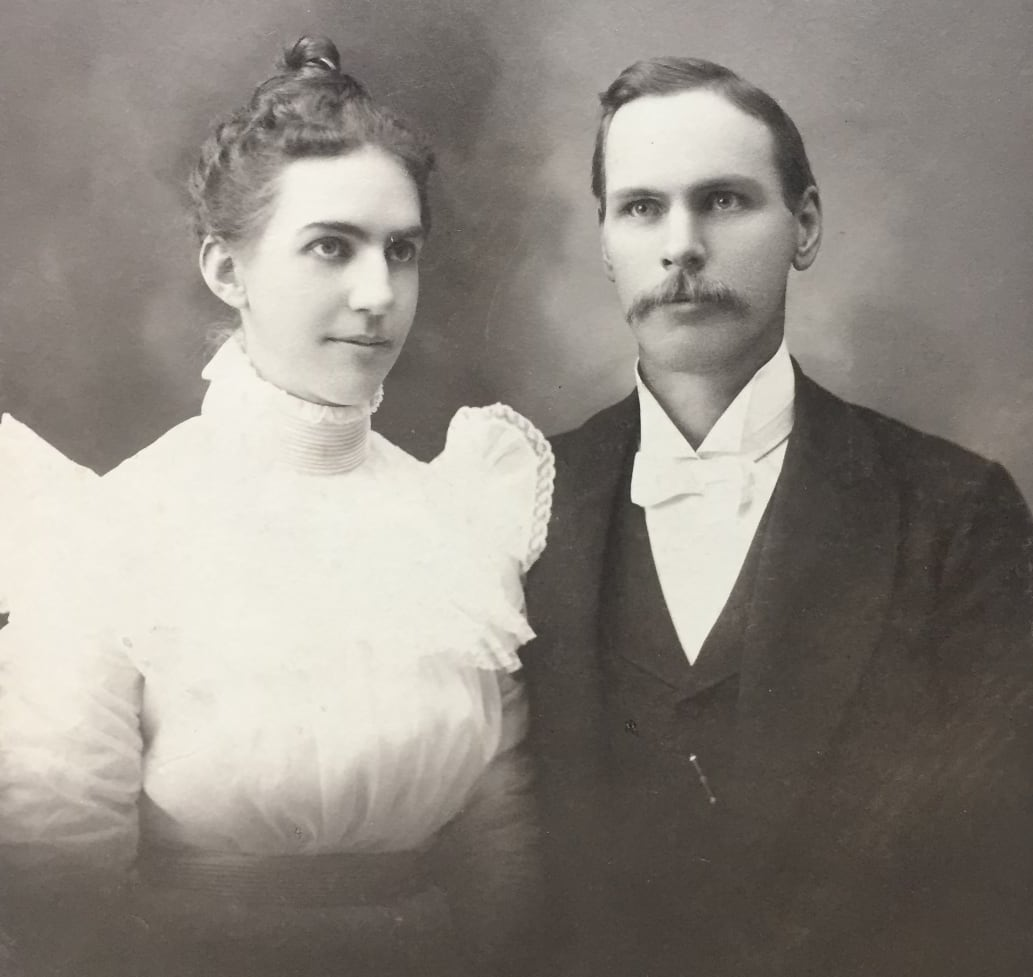
Mary Wiborg Hong and Nils J Hong photographed in St. Paul, MN circa 1898.

Hong was born on February 7, 1866, to Norwegian parents Thore Olsen Hong and Helen Nilsdatter Brendum Hong in Westby, Wisconsin. The family moved to Minnesota when he was a child. He attended the Willmar Seminary in Minnesota at various times from 1881 to 1892. When not attending school, Hong taught at parochial and public schools. He graduated from Luther College in 1895, and returned to Willmar Seminary as an instructor. He married Mary W Wiborg in 1898.

== Career ==
He was 31 years old when he came to the Pacific Lutheran University (PLU) in 1897, as a teacher. One of his tasks was to prepare the catalog for the coming year and also to teach psychology, history, rhetoric and English literature.

Nils Hong was elected principal and president of Pacific Lutheran in 1898, the year the name was changed to Pacific Lutheran Academy and Business College. He held the position he held until 1918 when the school suspended instruction for two years. During President Hong's tenure, the school received full accreditation making it possible for students to transfer with full credits.

When PLA suspended instruction between 1918 and 1920, Hong acted as superintendent of Parkland Children's Home for a year and then took a position as an English teacher at Lincoln High School. He returned to the renamed Pacific Lutheran College in 1929, where he remained as a teacher until his retirement in 1938, one year before his death.

Nils Hong was a reformer and a staunchly religious and moral man. Throughout his life in Parkland, he was active in the affairs of the Norwegian Lutheran Church – including serving as a deacon for Parkland's Trinity Lutheran Church.

He was instrumental in the organization of Parkland Light and Water Company in 1914. He held various offices there and served on the Board of Directors until 1938. Parkland Light and Water is the oldest privately held utility company in the United States.

Hong died on September 11, 1939, in Parkland, Pierce, Washington. North Hall built in 1954, was renamed Hong Hall to honor the third president of the school. His wife Mary W Wiborg (born May 3, 1867) died September 28, 1944. Both Mary and Nils are buried in the Parkland Lutheran Cemetery in Tacoma, Washington.
