= 1974 NCAA Division III soccer tournament =

1974 NCAA Division III Men's Soccer Championship
Tournament details
- Country: United States
- Teams: 16

Final positions
- Champions: Brockport State (1st title)
- Runners-up: Swarthmore

Tournament statistics
- Matches played: 15
- Goals scored: 59 (3.93 per match)
- Top goal scorer(s): (Brazil) Nelson Cupello, Brockport State (5); McWilling Todman, Swarthmore (5)

The 1974 NCAA Division III Soccer Championship was the inaugural tournament held by the NCAA to determine the top men's Division III college soccer program in the United States.

Brockport State defeated Swarthmore in the championship match, 3–1, to win their first Division III national title.

The semifinals and final were played at Wheaton College in Wheaton, Illinois.

== Bracket ==
First Round; Campus sites
*	Westfield State	10
Coast Guard	1
*	Framingham State (OT)	2
Plymouth State	1
*	SUNY Binghamton	2
SUNY Brockport (2OT)	3
*	Rutgers–Newark	1
Trenton State (OT)	2
*	Lynchburg	1
Swarthmore	2
*	Lock Haven State	1
Eckerd	0
*	Mount Union	5
Denison	2
*	Wheaton (IL)	1
MacMurray (OT)	2

Quarterfinals; Campus sites
*	Westfield State	3
Framingham State	0
SUNY Brockport	1
*	Trenton State	0
Swarthmore	1
*	Lock Haven State	0
*	Mount Union	1
MacMurray	2

Semifinals; Wheaton, IL
Westfield State	0
SUNY Brockport	6
Swarthmore (OT)	1
MacMurray	0

Final; Wheaton, IL
SUNY Brockport	3
Swarthmore	1
Third place
Westfield State	3
MacMurray	1

== Final ==
November 30, 1974

SUNY Brockport	3–1	Swarthmore

Wheaton, Illinois
Attendance: 100

== See also ==
- 1974 NCAA Division I Soccer Tournament
- 1974 NCAA Division II Soccer Championship
- 1974 NAIA Soccer Championship
