= Pacific Lutheran University Crew =

This article features terminology unique to rowing. For further information see main article Glossary of Rowing Terms

PLU Crew is the varsity rowing program for Pacific Lutheran University in Tacoma, Washington. Today the team consists of a varsity Women's programs, a member of National Collegiate Athletic Association Division III, as well as the Northwest Conference, and a club Men's program.

pre-2017 Oar Design

== History and Traditions ==
The team was founded in 1964 as a joint program with University of Puget Sound. Following the demise of the PLU-UPS rowing club, Pacific Lutheran rowers formed the Lute Varsity Rowing Club in 1965.

PLU Crew first received national notoriety in 1967, when University of Washington requested the return of their old shell the "Husky Clipper," which the Huskies had used to win at the 1936 Berlin Olympics. In exchange, UW arranged for Green Lake Crew to donate a shell, the "Loyal Shoudy" to the PLU team. Faced with no means of transporting the boat from north Seattle to PLU's home course in south Tacoma, team Commodore/Captain Jim Ojala devised a plan for the team to row the shell from Lake Union, through the Ballard Locks and down Puget Sound to the Tacoma Narrows. After several months of endurance training, contacting the Navy and Coast Guard, and obtaining a parade permit to walk the shell through North Seattle from Green Lake to Lake Union, the ten team members prepared to embark on their journey. The stunt resulted in the team receiving coverage of the event from the Seattle Post-Intelligencer newspaper, as well as national rowing magazine Rowing News.

The team received a major setback after its boathouse burnt to the ground in Spring 1975. However, in 1998 the team moved up the lake to its new boathouse, located on American Lake at Harry Todd Park in Tillicum.

In 2002, the women's team earned their first ever selection to the NCAA Division III rowing championship.They have competed a total of eight times (2002, 2016, 2017, 2018, 2019, 2021, 2022, 2025), with a highest finish of 4th in 2016.

PLU's lightweight rowing program achieved some successes. In 2002, the Men's Lwt 4+ won the Dad Vails Regatta in Philadelphia The Men's team has not returned to Dad Vails since 2002, they have since won the NCRC title in 2005 and 2007.

Not to be outdone, the Women's Lwt 4+ won the 2004 WIRA Championships at Lake Natoma, California. They followed up their win with second-place finishes in the event in 2005 and 2006.

The team's last red cedar shell, the Marjory Anderson, was refurbished in 2004, and was located for display in the new college bookstore beginning in July 2007.

They formerly competed as a member of the Northwest Collegiate Rowing Conference (NCRC) until 2015, when the Northwest Conference began sponsoring the women's rowing championship. The team went on to win every conference championship from 2016 until 2022.

== Meyer Cup (Men) and Lamberth Cup (Women) ==
Each Spring marks the annual Meyer-Lamberth Cup .

Meyer Cup Results (men's varsity eight)

- PLU: 29 wins
- UPS: 27 wins

Meyer Cup Results
Date	Winner	Series (PLU-UPS)
1964	Pacific Lutheran	01-00
1965	Pacific Lutheran	02-00
1966	Pacific Lutheran	03-00
1967	Pacific Lutheran	04-00
1968	Pacific Lutheran	05-00
1969	Pacific Lutheran	06-00
1970	Pacific Lutheran	07-00
1971	Pacific Lutheran	08-00
1972	Pacific Lutheran	09-00
1973	Pacific Lutheran	10-00
1974	Pacific Lutheran	11-00
1975	Puget Sound	11-01
1976	Puget Sound	11-02
1977	Pacific Lutheran	12-02
1978	Pacific Lutheran	13-02
1979	Pacific Lutheran	14-02
1980	Puget Sound	14-03
1981	Puget Sound	14-04
1982	Puget Sound	14-05
1983	Puget Sound	14-06
1984	Pacific Lutheran	15-06
1985	Pacific Lutheran	16-06
1986	Pacific Lutheran	17-06
1987	Pacific Lutheran	18-06
1988	Pacific Lutheran	19-06
1989	Pacific Lutheran	20-06
1990	Puget Sound	20-07
1991	Puget Sound	20-08
1992	Puget Sound	20-09
1993	Pacific Lutheran	21-09
1994	Pacific Lutheran	22-09
1995	Pacific Lutheran	23-09
1996	Pacific Lutheran	24-09
1997	Pacific Lutheran	25-09
1998	Pacific Lutheran	26-09
1999	Pacific Lutheran	27-09
2000	Pacific Lutheran	28-09
2001	Puget Sound	28-10
2002	Puget Sound	28-11
2003	Puget Sound	28-12
2004	Puget Sound	28-13
2005	Puget Sound	28-14
2006	Puget Sound	28-15
2007	Puget Sound	28-16
2008	Puget Sound	28-17
2009	Puget Sound	28-18
2010	Puget Sound	28-19
2011	Puget Sound	28-20
2012	Pacific Lutheran	29-20
2013	Puget Sound	29-21
2014	Puget Sound	29-22
2015	Puget Sound	29-23
2016	Puget Sound	29-24
2017	Puget Sound	29-25
2018	Puget Sound	29-26
2019	Puget Sound	29-27

Lamberth Cup Results (women's varsity eight)

- PLU: 29 wins
- UPS: 19 wins

Lamberth Cup Results
Date	Winner	Series (PLU-UPS)
1977	Pacific Lutheran	01-00
1978	Pacific Lutheran	02-00
1979	Pacific Lutheran	03-00
1980	Pacific Lutheran	04-00
1981	Pacific Lutheran	05-00
1982	Puget Sound	05-01
1983	Puget Sound	05-02
1984	Pacific Lutheran	06-02
1985	Pacific Lutheran	07-02
1986	Pacific Lutheran	08-02
1987	Pacific Lutheran	09-02
1988	Pacific Lutheran	10-02
1989	Pacific Lutheran	11-02
1990	Pacific Lutheran	12-02
1991	Pacific Lutheran	13-02
1992	Pacific Lutheran	14-02
1993	Pacific Lutheran	15-02
1994	Pacific Lutheran	16-02
1995	Pacific Lutheran	17-02
1996	Pacific Lutheran	18-02
1997	Pacific Lutheran	19-02
1998	Puget Sound	19-03
1999	Pacific Lutheran	20-03
2000	Pacific Lutheran	21-03
2001	Pacific Lutheran	22-03
2002	Pacific Lutheran	23-03
2003	Puget Sound	23-04
2004	Puget Sound	23-05
2005	Puget Sound	23-06
2006	Puget Sound	23-07
2007	Puget Sound	23-08
2008	Puget Sound	23-09
2009	Puget Sound	23-10
2010	Puget Sound	23-11
2011	Pacific Lutheran	24-11
2012	Puget Sound	24-12
2013	Puget Sound	24-13
2014	Puget Sound	24-14
2015	Puget Sound	24-15
2016	Pacific Lutheran	25-15
2017	Pacific Lutheran	26-15
2018	Puget Sound	26-16
2019	Pacific Lutheran	27-16
2021	Pacific Lutheran	28-16
2022	Pacific Lutheran	29-16
2023	Puget Sound	29-17
2024	Puget Sound	29-18
2025	Puget Sound	29-19

== Head coaches ==
Coach	Tenure
Paul Meyer	1964-1965
J.R. Goerke	1965-1966
Jim Ojala	1966-1969
Norm Purvis	1969-1970
Ralph Neils	1971-1972
Dave Peterson	1974-1985
Bob Trondsen / Elise Lindborg	1986
Jeff Glenn / Elise Lindborg	1987
Doug Herland	1988-1991
Doug Nelson	1991-2000
Sarah Halsted	2000-2003
Tone Lawver	2004-2011
Thomas Schlenker	2012-2014
Tara Brunsfield	2014-2015
Lori Cark	2015-2016
Dave Harvey	2016-2021
Andy Foltz	2015-2022
Lizzie	2022-2023
Sienna Mathes	2023-2024
Matthew Oclander	2024-present

== All-Americans ==
Year	Athlete(s)
1993	Brian Erstguard
2004	Lauren Rutledge
2005	Katie Schlepp
2006	Katie Schlepp Erin Wolf
2007	Amber Iverson
2008	Kat Jenkins
2009	Kat Jenkins
2011	Abby Smith
2016	Hannah Peterson
2017	Hannah Peterson
2018	Hannah Peterson
2019	Hannah Peterson Madeline Woods
2021	Julez Johnson Elizabeth Horner
2022	Julez Johnson Elizabeth Horner

== National team members ==
- Sarah Jones '93, competitor in the Women's 8+ at the 2000 Summer Olympics and in the 2- at the 2004 Athens Olympic Games.
- Doug Herland '73, Bronze medalist coxswain in the M2+ at the 1984 Los Angeles Olympic Games.
- Bjorn Larsen '03, Silver medalist in the ML4- at the 2007 Pan American Games.
- Elise Linborg '84, competitor at the 1996 Atlanta Olympic Games.

== See also ==
- College rowing in the United States
- NCAA Division III rowing championship
