= Oscar Harstad =

American baseball player (1892–1985)

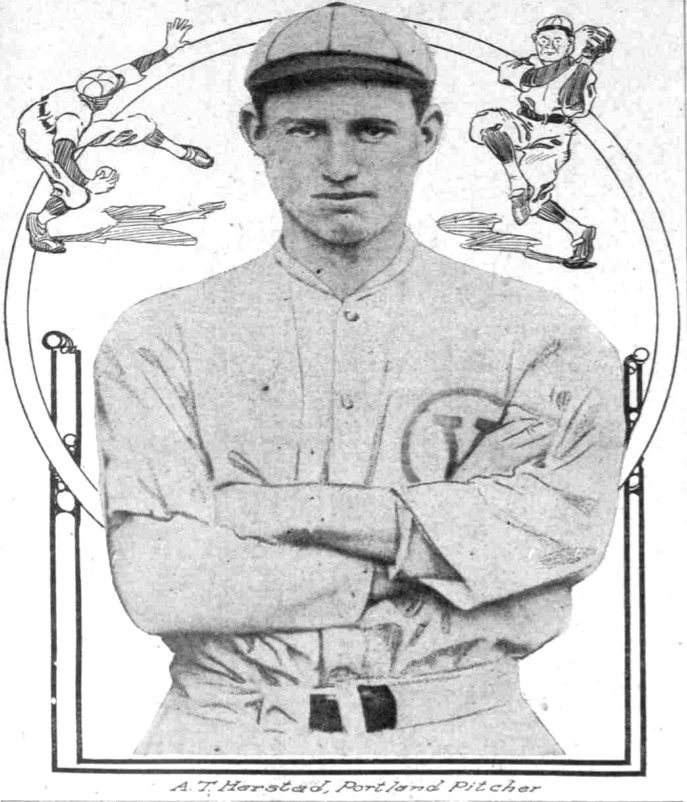
- Pitcher
- Born: May 24, 1892; Parkland, Washington
- Died: November 14, 1985 (aged 93); Corvallis, Oregon
- Batted: Right Threw: Right

MLB debut
- April 23, 1915, for the Cleveland Indians

Last MLB appearance
- August 28, 1915, for the Cleveland Indians

MLB statistics
- Win–loss record: 3–5
- Earned run average: 3.40
- Strikeouts: 35
- Stats at Baseball Reference

Teams
- Cleveland Indians (1915)

Oscar Theander Harstad (May 24, 1892 – November 14, 1985) was an American Major League Baseball pitcher who appeared in 32 games for the Cleveland Indians during the 1915 Cleveland Indians season. Known by his family and friends as "Theander," in his baseball career he was also known as "O.T.", and then as "Doc" when he became a dentist, serving the Milton-Freewater, Oregon community for over 50 years.

Harstad was born in Parkland, Washington,the eighth of 11 children of Guro Omlid and Bjug Harstad, the founder of Pacific Lutheran University. He died in Corvallis, Oregon, at age 93. He was buried at Oaklawn Cemetery in Corvallis.
