= 1970 NAIA soccer championship =

1970 NAIA Soccer Championship

Tournament details
- Country: United States
- Venue: Dunn, North Carolina
- Teams: 8

Final positions
- Champions: Davis & Elkins (2nd title)
- Runners-up: Quincy (IL)
- Third place: Campbell
- Fourth place: New Paltz State

Tournament statistics
- Matches played: 12
- Goals scored: 36 (3 per match)

Awards
- Best player: William Nuttall, Davis & Elkins

The 1970 NAIA Soccer Championship was the 12th annual tournament held by the NAIA to determine the national champion of men's college soccer among its members in the United States.

Davis & Elkins defeated Quincy (IL) in the final, 2–0, to claim the Senators' second NAIA national title. This was a rematch of the 1968 final, also won by Davis & Elkins.

The final was played at Dunn, North Carolina.

== Qualification ==
For the third year, the tournament field remained fixed at eight teams.

Qualified Teams
School	Appearance	Last Bid
Campbell	2nd	1969
Davis & Elkins	3rd	1969
Earlham	4th	1968
New Haven	1st	Never
New Paltz State	1st	Never
Ottawa (KS)	2nd	1969
Quincy (IL)	4th	1968
Westmont	3rd	1969

== Bracket ==
Fifth place
Westmont	0
Ottawa (KS)	1
Seventh place
Earlham	2
New Haven	4

Consolation semifinals
Westmont	3
Earlham	0
Ottawa (KS)	3
New Haven	0

First round
Quincy (IL)	4
Westmont	0
Campbell	4
Earlham	1
New Paltz State	2
Ottawa (KS)	0
Davis & Elkins	1******
New Haven	0

Championship semifinals
Quincy (IL)	4
Campbell	1
New Paltz State	0
Davis & Elkins	1

Championship
Quincy (IL)	0
Davis & Elkins	2
Third place
Campbell	2
New Paltz State	1

== See also ==
- 1970 NCAA soccer tournament
