= 1973 NCAA Division I soccer tournament =

1973 College Cup

Tournament details
- Country: United States
- Venue(s): Miami Orange Bowl; Miami, Florida
- Teams: 24

Final positions
- Champions: Saint Louis (10th title)
- Runners-up: UCLA
- Semifinalists: Brown; Clemson

Tournament statistics
- Matches played: 23
- Goals scored: 85 (3.7 per match)

Awards
- Best player: None designated

The 1973 NCAA Division I soccer tournament was the 15th annual tournament organized by the National Collegiate Athletic Association to determine the national champion of men's college soccer among its Division I members in the United States. Beginning with this season, the NCAA changed its classification system, and the former University Division was rebranded as Division I.

The final match was played at the Miami Orange Bowl in Miami, Florida on January 4.

Saint Louis won their tenth national title, and second consecutive, by defeating UCLA in the championship game, 2–1 after one overtime period.

== Qualifying ==
Five teams made their debut appearances in the NCAA soccer tournament: Madison College (James Madison), Northern Illinois, Oneonta (SUNY Oneonta), Santa Clara, and Yale.

== Bracket ==
First round
Bridgeport	1
Yale	3
Connecticut	0
Brown (a.e.t.)	1
Oneonta (a.e.t.)	2
Army	1
Hartwick College	3
Long Island	2
Clemson	7
Madison College	0
West Virginia	1
South Florida	3
Penn	5
Temple	1
Penn State	5
Philadelphia Textile	3

Second round
Yale	1
Brown (a.e.t.)	2
Oneonta	0
Hartwick College	2
Saint Louis	6
Bowling Green	0
SIU Edwardsville	3
Northern Illinois	0
Clemson (a.e.t.)	1
South Florida	0
Penn	4
Penn State	0
San Francisco	5
Santa Clara	0
UCLA	3
Washington	0

Quarterfinals
Brown (a.e.t.)	1
Hartwick College	0
Saint Louis	3
SIU Edwardsville	0
Clemson	1
Penn	0
San Francisco	2
UCLA	3

Semifinals
Brown	1
Saint Louis	3
Clemson	1
UCLA (a.e.t.)	2

Championship
Saint Louis	2*
UCLA	1

== Final ==
January 4, 1974

Saint Louis	2–1 (OT)	UCLA

Miami Orange Bowl, Miami, Florida
Attendance: 5,861

== See also ==
- 1973 NCAA Division II Soccer Championship
- 1973 NAIA Soccer Championship
