= Pacific Lutheran University =

Private university in Parkland, Washington, US

- Former names: Pacific Lutheran University (1890–1898); Pacific Lutheran Academy and Business College (1898–1918); Columbia Lutheran College (1909–1919); Spokane College (1906–1929); Pacific Lutheran College (1920–1960)
- Motto: Educating for Lives of Thoughtful Inquiry, Service, Leadership, and Care
- Type: Private university
- Established: 1890
- Religious affiliation: Evangelical Lutheran Church in America
- Endowment: $123.1 million
- President: Allan Belton
- Provost: Joanna Gregson
- Faculty: 340
- Students: 2754
- Undergraduates: 2366
- Postgraduates: 388
- Location: Parkland, Washington, U.S. 47.1449°N 122.4428°W
- Campus: Suburban, 156 acres (63 ha)
- Colors: Black and gold
- Nickname: Lutes
- Sporting affiliations: NCAA Division III - Northwest Conference
- Mascot: Sir Lance-a-Lute
- Website: plu.edu
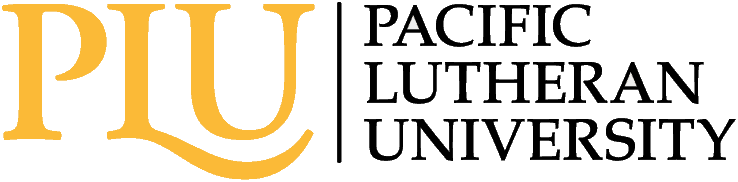

Pacific Lutheran University (PLU) is a private Lutheran university in Parkland, Washington, United States. It was founded by Norwegian Lutheran immigrants in 1890. PLU is sponsored by the 580 congregations of Region I of the Evangelical Lutheran Church in America. It has approximately 2,700 students enrolled. As of 2023, the school employs approximately 238 full-time professors on the 156-acre (63 ha) woodland campus.

PLU’s academic programs into four colleges: the College of Health Professions; the College of Liberal Studies; the College of Natural Sciences; and the College of Professional Studies.

== History ==
=== Early years ===
The university was chartered by the State of Washington as the Pacific Lutheran Academy on December 11, 1890. In naming the university, the Norwegian immigrants who founded it recognized the role that a Lutheran educational institution on the Western frontier could play in the region. They wanted the institution to help immigrants adjust to their new land and find jobs, but they also wanted it to produce graduates who would serve church and community. Education—and educating for service—was a venerated part of the Scandinavian traditions from which these pioneers came.

Classes first began in 1894 with the student body consisting of 30 students. Tuition at the time cost $1 per week. Bjug Harstad was the school's first president. The entire university was housed in one building from 1894 to 1912. This building was formerly known as Old Main but has since been renamed Harstad Hall in honor of the school's founding president.

In 1898, the university's name was changed to Pacific Lutheran Academy and Business College. Attempting to eliminate the debt plaguing the school, Bjug Harstad left for Alaska to search for gold. He spent one and a half years there but was unable to discover any gold. In 1902, the PLA athletic club celebrated its first victory in men's basketball with a 15–12 win over the University of Washington. Five years later women would be allowed to play basketball.

In 1912, a second building, a gymnasium, was constructed on the university campus. It included a track, a stage, and a science laboratory in the basement. Two years later students built a tennis court in what is now Red Square. By 1914, PLA received full accreditation meaning students could transfer to universities and retain their credits.

Although founded as a university, the institution functioned primarily as an academy until 1918, when it suspended instruction for two years. It reopened as the two-year Pacific Lutheran College, after merging with Columbia Lutheran College, previously located in Everett. Further consolidations occurred when Spokane College merged with PLC in 1929. Four-year baccalaureate degrees were first offered in education in 1939 and in the liberal arts in 1942. The institution was reorganized as a university in 1960, reclaiming its original name.

=== Pacific Lutheran College ===
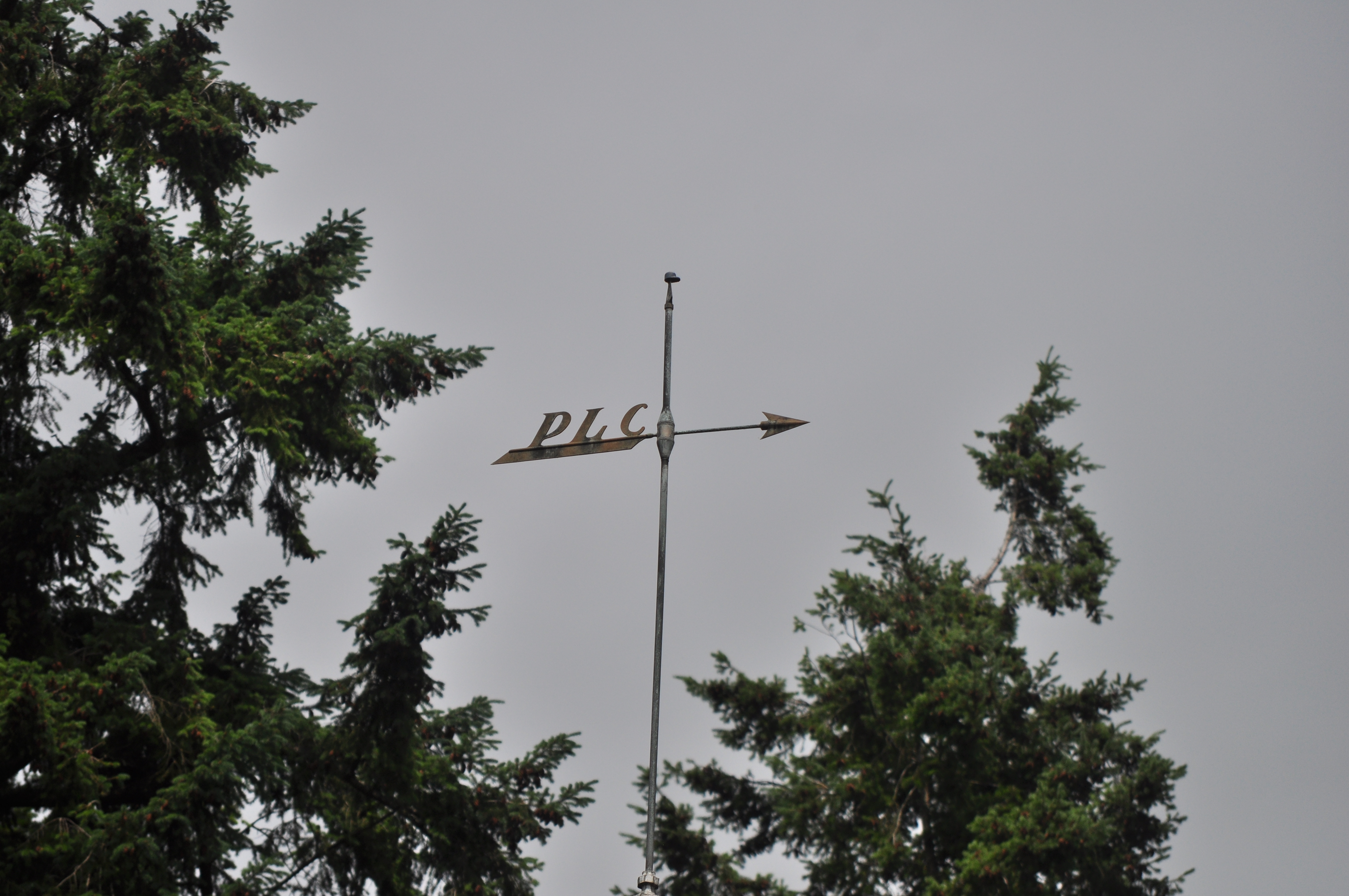
The PLC initials can still be seen on this weather vane atop Xavier Hall.

In 1920, the school merged with Columbia College in Everett, Washington, and reopened as Pacific Lutheran College. With the reopening of the school, came the construction of the chapel. Classes were held in the chapel until 1967. The chapel was also the home of Trinity Lutheran Church until the congregation built its own church in 1937. The school's first football team was launched in 1926. They were originally known as the "Greyhounds", then the "Gladiators" (although they are unofficially referred to as the "Lutes"). Also in 1926, Polly Langlow, a member of PLC's women's basketball team, scored 270 points in 12 games setting a national record. In 1927, the college's great musical tradition, the Choir of the West, was founded. The Choir acquired its name on a trip to the Great Lakes region.

Another merger occurred in 1929 when Spokane College, another Northwest Norwegian Lutheran school, closed. Its academic records were merged with PLC's, and several of its faculty members came to PLC. In 1937 the university acquired the golf course through a generous donation. In 1937, the cornerstone was also laid for the library. The first of several visits by Norwegian royalty happened in 1939, when Crown Prince Olav and Crown Princess Märtha came to PLC's campus.

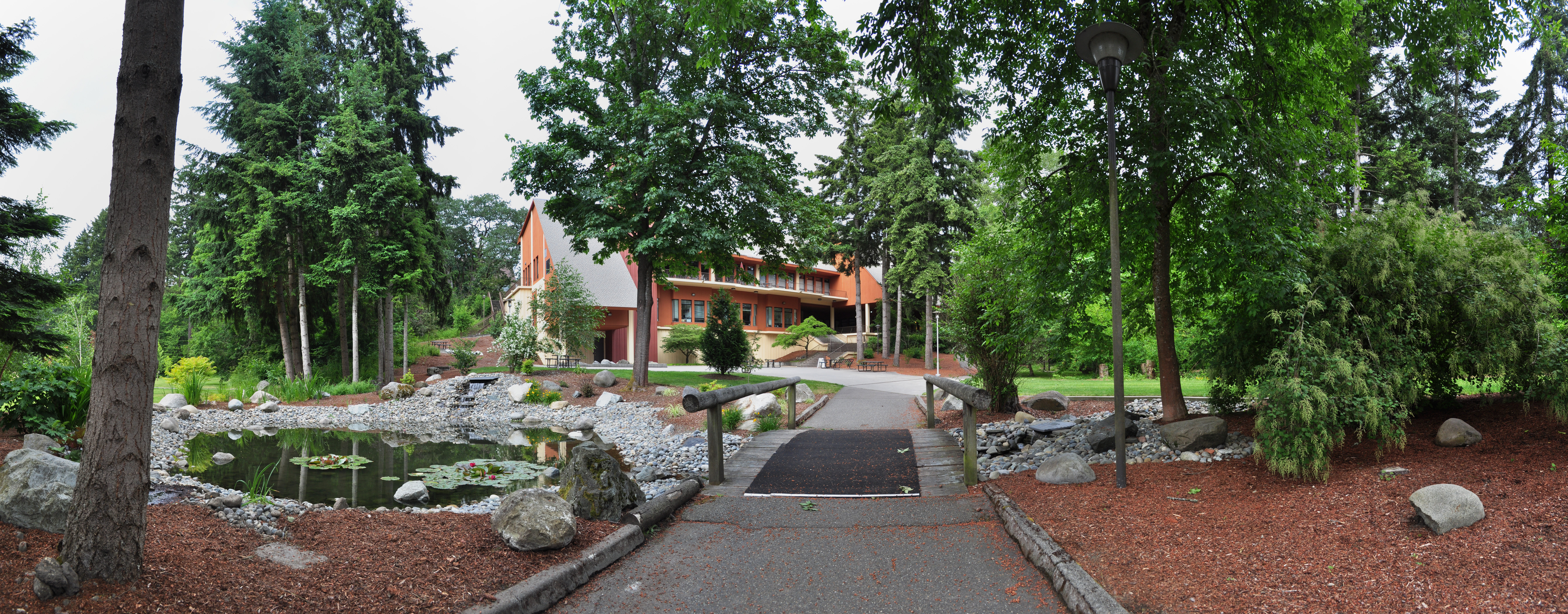
Rear view of Anderson University Center, showing the garden behind the building

During the early 1940s, PLC's student body was almost all female as most men were fighting in World War II. People returning to college post-war, specifically veterans using the G.I. Bill, caused a boom in enrollment. The student body at that time was half veteran and no longer mostly female. A number of buildings were completed in the following years including Ramstad Hall, Memorial Gymnasium, and the Student Union Building (now renamed as Anderson University Center). In 1952 the new Chapel-Music-Speech Building was constructed and later named Eastvold Chapel (renamed in 2013 as the Karen Hille Phillips Center for the Performing Arts). Chapel became mandatory for the first time with attendance being taken and seats being assigned. Two years later North and South Halls, the first dormitories, were built (later renamed Hong Hall and Hinderlie Hall, respectively.) Until that time students had lived in Old Main or boarded with Parkland families.

=== University status ===
Reclaiming the original name, Pacific Lutheran College became known as Pacific Lutheran University in 1960. Along with the name of the school being changed the PLU mascot was also changed from the Gladiators to the Knights. In the 1960s a decade-long construction boom began and 10 buildings were built by 1970, almost as many as had been built in the previous 70 years. The 1960s and 1970s were a time of great change on PLU's campus when restrictions on student life began to loosen. Chapel was no longer required and two dormitories became coed. Girls' dormitories' restrictive hours were replaced with a card-key system, and opposite-sex visitation was allowed 3 times a week instead of 2 times a year. Dancing was allowed for the first time on campus in 1963. Several well-known entertainers performed at PLU including Louis Armstrong, Ray Charles, The Steve Miller Band, The Righteous Brothers, B.B. King, Ike & Tina Turner, and Bob Hope.

Throughout its history PLU has remained close to its Scandinavian roots. In 1975 the school played host to King Olav V of Norway. Three years later in 1978, 14 members of Stortinget, the Norwegian Parliament, visited PLU. In 1982 King Carl XVI Gustaf and Queen Silvia of Sweden visited PLU and in 1983, Princess Astrid of Norway paid a visit to the university. Also in 1983, a monument was erected in Valle Municipality in Norway, to honor the Rev. Bjug Harstad, founder of PLU. By 1989 a Scandinavian Cultural Center would be completed on the lower floor of the University Center. King Harald V and Queen Sonja of Norway came to PLU in 1995 with Queen Sonja receiving an honorary Doctorate of Humane Letters. Crown Prince Haakon of Norway visited PLU in 1999. King Harald V and Queen Sonja of Norway visited PLU once again in the summer of 2015. To mark its 125th anniversary in 2015, PLU awarded an honorary Doctor of Laws degree to King Harald V of Norway.

=== Presidents ===
The first President of the Pacific Lutheran University was Rev. Bjug Harstad. The entire university was housed in one building from 1894 to 1912. The building was formerly known as Old Main but has since been renamed Harstad Hall in honor of the founding president.

The 14th president of the Pacific Lutheran University is L. Allan Belton, appointed in April 2019 after serving in the role as acting president for the past two years.

Number	Name	Years in office
1	Bjug Harstad	1894–1895, 1897–1898
2	Ole Grönsberg	1895–1897
3	Nils Joseph Hong	1898–1918
4	J. U. Xavier	1920–1921
5	Ola Ordal	1921–1928
6	Oscar Tingelstad	1928–1943
7	Seth C. Eastvold	1943–1962
8	Robert A. L. Mortvedt	1962–1969
9	Eugene Wiegman	1969–1974
10	Richard P. Jungkuntz	1974–1975
11	William O. Rieke	1975–1992
12	Loren J. Anderson	1992–2012
13	Thomas W. Krise	2012–2017
14	L. Allan Belton	2017–present

=== AAUP censure ===
In June 2020, PLU was added to the American Association of University Professors (AAUP) list of censured administrations. An AAUP report found that a long-serving PLU faculty member had been dismissed in violation of the AAUP's 1940 Statement of Principles on Academic Freedom and Tenure allegedly in retaliation for engaging in labor union organizing activities.

=== Reductions and reallocations ===
In April 2021, the board of regents at PLU announced its approval for cuts to 36 full-time faculty equivalent (FTE) positions, which included some tenured faculty members losing their positions. The university planned to discontinue two majors (German, Nordic Studies), four minors (Classical Studies, Norwegian, German), and one master's program (Master of Science in Finance). The cuts also affected various programs in other ways. For example, some departments, including anthropology, lost so many faculty that they had to give up their majors. All cuts were planned to be implemented beginning with the fall 2022 semester. That was expected to save between $2.5 million and $4 million.

The cuts announced in April 2021 followed cuts of about 31 FTE faculty announced during the 2017–2018 academic year, with savings of around $2.8 million. Cuts announced in 2018 also affected some majors and minors. PLU had 376 faculty members in September 2017. More than 1 in 6 FTE faculty positions (67 positions) will have been eliminated as a result of the cuts announced in 2017-2018 and April 2021. The faculty cuts announced in 2017-2018 were made largely through attrition or enticing professors close to retirement to retire early, whereas the cuts announced in April 2021 involved more involuntary cuts, with some tenured and tenure-track and most contingent professors involuntarily losing their jobs.

== Admission and financial aid ==
Tuition for the 2025-2026 school year is $53,831, with room and board costing an additional $13,710. More than 97 percent of PLU students received some sort of financial support. The 2020 U.S. News College and University rankings listed PLU as the seventh most innovative school, ninth best undergraduate teaching, and tenth best value school in the west region. The 2019–2020 student body was as follows: 64 percent female, 36 percent male; 41 percent were students of color; 75 percent were from Washington state; 13 percent were Lutheran; 3 percent were international students representing 23 countries.

== Academics ==
The academic calendar at PLU is divided into two semesters, fall and spring, with a one-month term during January known as J-term. Summer classes are also offered. During J-term students take one class for the entire month of January which counts as a normal 4-credit class one would take during a semester. PLU offers 44 majors and 54 minors in a wide array of disciplines.

Pacific Lutheran University is institutionally accredited by the Northwest Commission on Colleges and Universities (NWCCU). Several academic programs also hold specialized accreditation, including business (AACSB International), nursing (Commission on Collegiate Nursing Education), music (National Association of Schools of Music), social work (Council on Social Work Education), and marriage and family therapy (COAMFTE).

=== Study away ===
In 2009, PLU received the Senator Paul Simon Award for Campus Internationalization. In the same year PLU matched a $1 million grant from the Bill & Melinda Gates Foundation to create an endowment to assist low-income students to participate in study away programs. The Wang Center for International Programs opened in 2002 as the result of a $4 million donation from Peter, a 1960 PLU graduate, and Grace Wang. PLU maintains a partnership with Sichuan University, a university on the Entity List of the United States Department of Commerce's Bureau of Industry and Security. Nearly 50% of PLU students study away.

=== Partnerships ===
PLU has hosted a Confucius Institute since 2020 when it took over the Confucius Institute from the University of Washington.

== Campus ==
The Pacific Lutheran University campus is located six miles (10 km) south of Tacoma, Washington, in suburban Parkland on a 156-acre (63 ha) woodland campus. Joint Base Lewis-McChord is less than a half-mile (800 m) west of Parkland. The campus is unofficially divided into two sections, upper campus and lower campus.

Upper campus is home to many of the academic and administration buildings including the Phillip Hauge Administration Building, Mortvedt Library, Ramstad Hall and Xavier Hall. In 1964, the Board of Regents engaged Richard Haag—'the father of Northwest Landscape Architecture'—to design the landscape architecture plan for upper campus. Haag is famous for his work on Gas Works Park in Seattle, Washington and on the Bloedel Reserve on Bainbridge Island as well as the Seattle Center.

The Mortvedt Library offers over 260,000 volumes of books as well as over 23,000 full-text journals. The oldest book in the PLU collection is a psalter by Johann Bugenhagen published in 1524. Built in 1937, Xavier Hall served as the library until the Mortvedt Library was built in 1967. Since then the Division of Social Sciences has been housed in Xavier. In 2000 Xavier underwent a $5 million renovation project that saw the addition of the Philip Nordquist Lecture Hall. The Anderson University Center is also located on upper campus. This building houses the all-campus cafeteria, called The Commons, and the Old Main Market convenience store. In addition it houses the offices of Campus Ministry, Student Involvement and Leadership, Residential Life, the Diversity Center, the Scandinavian Center, Student Media, Residence Hall Association, the Associated Students of PLU (ASPLU), Hospitality and Dining Services, and the Chris Knutzen Lecture Hall.

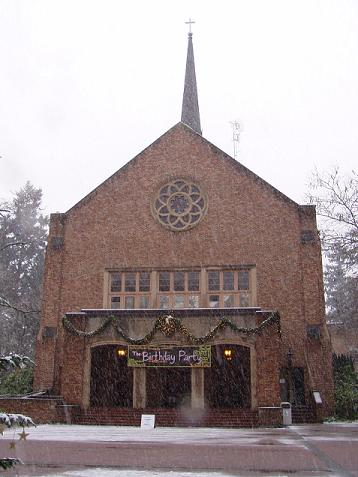
Eastvold Auditorium

Along with the academic and administration buildings upper campus also houses PLU's art programs. The Mary Baker Russell Music Center was built in 1997 and is the home of PLU's Department of Music. The acoustically impressive and well-known Lagerquist Concert Hall houses the Gottfried and Mary Fuchs Organ (the largest University-based mechanical action organ on the West Coast) as well as state-of-the-art practice and performance facilities. Ingram Hall is home to a communication computer lab, a digital photography/graphic design lab, and studio art classrooms for painting, ceramics, sculpture, photography and printmaking. Ingram boasts two galleries: the University Gallery (which houses major shows and exhibitions) and the Wekell Gallery (which generally houses student and class work). Eastvold Auditorium, formerly called Eastvold Chapel, seats 1100 and is the home of PLU Theatre. Eastvold hosts all main stage productions as well as a range of smaller productions throughout the year. In October 2011, PLU Theatre premiered a new addition to its arts department, the Karen H. Phillips Center for the Performing Arts. Named after the former Regent, this space is a symbol of the completion of phase one in Eastvold Auditorium's renovations. Eastvold is set to reopen with a new performing arts center in the fall of 2013.

Lower campus is home to many of the university's athletic facilities including Olson Auditorium, Memorial Gymnasium, Names Fitness Center, and the university swimming pool. Also located on lower campus are the Rieke Science Center, Morken Center for Learning and Technology, Martin J. Neeb Building, and the Keck Observatory. Additional buildings around the perimeter of campus are also used for University purposes, including offices, the Wang Center for International Studies, East Campus, the Women's Center, the University House and Trinity Lutheran Church.

=== Residential life ===
PLU requires that all students under 20 years of age or junior status on or before September 1 live on campus or at home with a parent, spouse or child. Approximately half of all students enrolled at PLU live on campus. There are eight residence halls at PLU. There were 10 halls with six located on upper campus and four located on lower campus. Every year, the PLU football team helps move new students into their PLU home.

The residence halls:

- Harstad Hall, built in 1894, is the oldest building on campus and housed the entire university from 1894 to 1912. It became a residence hall in 1960. It is an all-female hall, the only single sex hall on campus. Harstad is five stories tall and houses approximately 200 female residents. In 1984 the building was listed on the National Register of Historic Places.
- Hinderlie Hall, built in 1954, Hinderlie Hall was first named South Hall but changed to Hinderlie in 1966 in honor of Berent and Ragna Hinderlie, university staff members between 1923 and 1955. The hall is four stories tall, with resident rooms on each floor including the south side of the basement, which is open to the hillside. Approximately 130 residents reside in Hinderlie.
- Hong International Hall, built in 1954, was originally named North Hall. In 1966 the building was renamed in honor of Nils Joseph Hong, president from 1898 until 1918 and a faculty member at Pacific Lutheran College until he retired in 1938. The hall had five language wings (Norwegian, Chinese, French, German, and Spanish) and the International Honors wing. Approximately 75 residents resided in Hong. In Summer 2025, Hong Hall ceased functioning as student housing and is now home to Wellbeing Services and Resources (WSR), which includes counseling services, student care support, health promotion, accessibility services, and the Dean of Students office.
- Kreidler Hall, built in 1957, was originally named West Hall. In 1966 the hall was renamed Kreidler Hall after Lora Bradford Kreidler, the Dean of Women and teacher of arts from 1921 to 1943. All rooms in Kreidler are single rooms and students must be 20 years of age or junior standing to reside in Kreidler. Approximately 65 students reside in Kreidler.
- Stuen Hall, built in 1966, is named after Ole J. Stuen, faculty member and administrator from 1913 to 1952. Approximately 100 residents reside in Stuen.
- Ordal Hall, built in 1967, is named in honor of Ola J. Ordal, president of Pacific Lutheran College from 1921 to 1928. The Hall was originally built to house 187 female students but has since become co-ed.
- Pflueger Hall, built in 1962, was the first residence hall built on lower campus. The building is named after Jesse P. Pflueger, professor of religion and philosophy from 1930 to 1958. It was designed to be a three-story hall to house 212 men, but since then has been converted to house both men and women.
- Foss Hall, built in 1965, is named after Rev. Halfdan L. Foss, chairman of the Pacific Lutheran Board of Trustees from 1942 to 1964. The hall originally housed 188 men but has since become co-ed. It was taken offline after Spring 2015. Foss Hall was demolished in June 2023.
- Tingelstad Hall, built in 1967, was originally designed to house 396 men but has since then become co-ed. The hall was named to honor Oscar A. Tingelstad, president of Pacific Lutheran College from 1928 to 1943. Standing nine stories tall Tingelstad is the tallest building in Parkland. The hall is divided into four houses, Alpine, Cascade, Evergreen and Ivy with every two floors sharing a common lounge.
- South Hall, built in 2000, is an apartment-style complex located on the south edge of campus. Students must be 20-years of age or junior standing to reside in South.
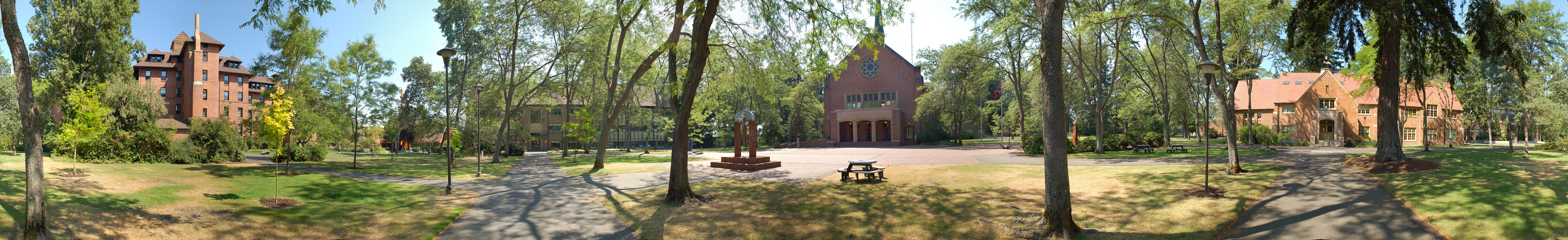
360° panorama of Pacific Lutheran University's campus as seen on a summer afternoon.

=== Commitment to sustainability ===
PLU has a long history of being committed to a sustainable campus and leading the way as an example for institutions around the world. A certification program in environmental studies was developed in the 1970s, and a major was established in the 1990s. On April 22, 2004, PLU President Loren Anderson signed the Talloires Declaration, making PLU the first Pacific Northwest University to sign the declaration. Leading the nation as a charter signatory to the American College and University presidents Climate Commitment in 2007, PLU accepted the challenge, showing commitment to achieving carbon neutrality. The agreement called for universities to reduce greenhouse gas emissions, but PLU has taken the initiative to set their goal of becoming carbon neutral by December 31, 2020. The 2015 edition of The Princeton Review's Guide to 353 Green Colleges recognized PLU as a green college leader. Highlights of the review include PLU dining services using 25 percent of its food budget to buy local and/or organic food and 95 percent of the products used by the cleaning services crew being Green Seal Certified.

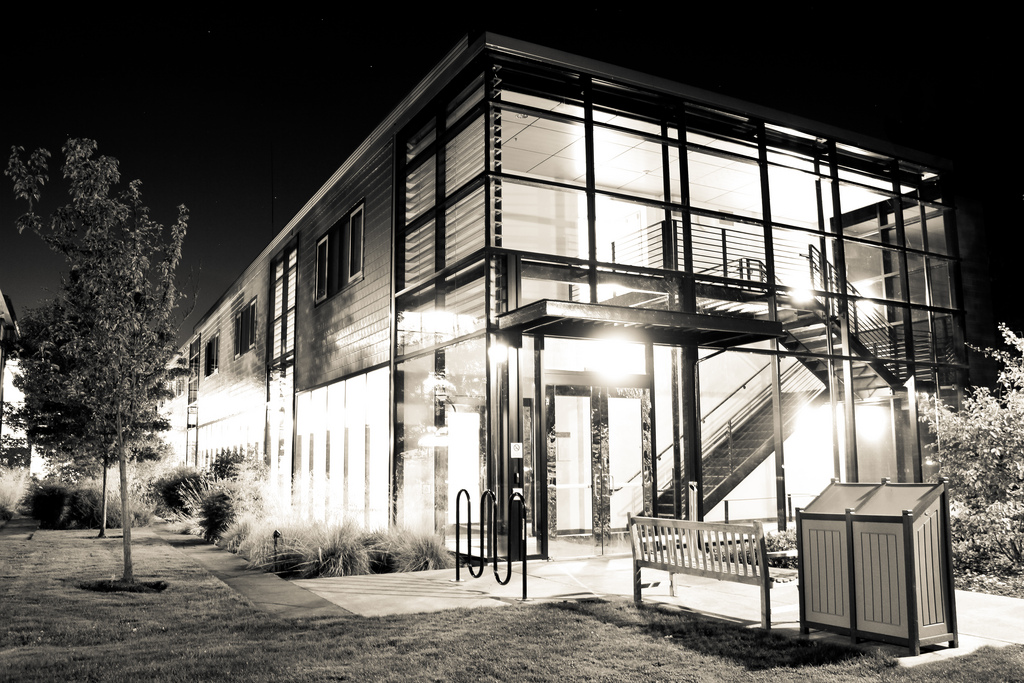
Morken Center at night

PLU is in the process of remodeling and reconstructing multiple buildings throughout campus. The goal is for each building to obtain a Leadership in Energy and Environmental Design (LEED) rating of Gold. Currently two buildings have been awarded a Gold rating by LEED. In 2006 the Morken Center for Learning and Technology became the first building to earn the award. The Morken Building is home to the School of Business and the Computer Science department. This 55,000 sq ft (5,100 m^{2}), $21 million building requires no fossil fuel to operate and is heated and cooled by using a geothermal heat-pump system that regulates its temperature with water stored in 85 wells located 300 feet (100 m) underground. In 2009 a second building would earn the LEED Gold rating when the Martin J. Neeb Center was completed. This building was home to the radio station 88.5 KPLU and at the time of the award being presented it was the only radio facility in the nation with a LEED Gold ranking. The University Center was the third building to receive a LEED rating. Following the completion of the 2006–2007 academic year, the University Center underwent $14 million in construction renovations and as a result earned a LEED Silver rating.

As of 2013, PLU diverted more than 70% of its waste. For its record on sustainability, the university was recognized with a Gold Award from the Association for the Advancement of Sustainability in Higher Education (AASHE). In 2008, a student-led initiative brought awareness about saving money by consuming tap water instead of buying bottled water. Bottled water is not sold in campus restaurants as a result of the student-run initiative in 2011. All of the programs in the PLU Sustainability Office are student-led i.e. Bike Coop, Community Garden, surPLUs store, and habitat restoration.

== Student activities ==
=== Music ===
PLU's instrumental groups include the University Symphony Orchestra, Wind Ensemble, Concert Band, Jazz Ensemble, Jazz Combo, and Chamber Music. Along with these groups the university has a variety of vocal groups which include the Choir of the West, University Chorale, University Singers, University Men's Chorus, Choral Union, and Chapel Choir.

=== The Mast and Student Media ===
The Mast is PLU's student-run newspaper. It was first printed in 1924 in the basement of the university chapel. It was originally named "The Mooring Mast", but was changed in Fall 2015 to simply "The Mast." The unusual, original name "The Mooring Mast" came from the USS Shenandoah, a U.S. Navy airship. In nearby Fort Lewis there was a large mooring structure for the airship and the students derived the name from this in honor of the famed ship. The Mast has won several awards for the publication.

The Mast has since converged into a student media group run through the Communications Department, which includes Late Knight, Rose Window Studios (formerly Showrunners), and Lute Air Student Radio (referred to as LASR). Late Knight and Showrunners were originally created as a part of Mast TV in 2015, though, upon Showrunners name change to in the 2022-2023 academic year, Rose Window Studios only loosely associates with Mast TV. LASR was created after the sale of KPLU-FM.

As of the 2025-2026 academic year, Late Knight is producing Season 11 of its sketch comedy show, which airs four times a year. Rose Window Studios produces short films and small documentaries multiple times a year, being selected to past film festivals. LASR provides the opportunity for many students to host their own radio shows to play music or talk about a variety of topics.

=== Media Lab ===
Also run by the Communications Department, Media Lab works with outside entities to create video projects on their behalf’s. Media Lab also typically creates documentaries, which have won numerous awards.

=== Army ROTC ===
PLU has a US Army Reserve Officer Training Corps (ROTC) detachment that each year commissions officers into the active Army, Army National Guard and Army Reserve. In addition to Army scholarships, PLU provides a room and board scholarship. The Lute Battalion of Army ROTC won the McArthur Award—the highest award available—in 2010, 2012 and 2013.

== KPLU-FM ==
KPLU-FM (88.5 MHz) is a news and jazz format National Public Radio member station that was owned by Pacific Lutheran University. While PLU held the license for the radio station and all KPLU staff members were also university employees, the university took a hands-off approach to on-air content. PLU supported the station with infrastructure amounting to more than $1.5 million annually.

=== Sale of KPLU ===
On November 12, 2015, it was announced to KPLU staff that PLU intended to sell the radio station to the University of Washington, which already operated KUOW. On May 26, 2016, Friends of 88.5 FM announced that they had raised $7 million to match the offer made by the University of Washington. On June 28, 2016, PLU announced that it had reached an agreement to transfer the license for 88.5 FM to Friends of 88.5 FM. The sale was consummated on August 30, 2016.

== Athletics ==
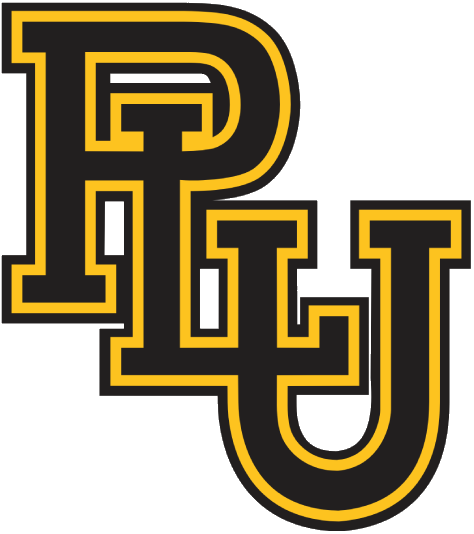
Pacific athletics logo

PLU is a member of National Collegiate Athletic Association Division III, as well as the Northwest Conference. PLU has a rich tradition of athletic success: in the Northwest Conference, no other school has won the All-Sports Trophy as many times as PLU. In 2014, PLU was honored as first recipient of Diversity Spotlight award for LGBTQ inclusion efforts by student-athletes.

PLU offers many varsity sports: baseball, men's and women's basketball, men's and women's cross country, football, men's and women's golf, women's lacrosse, women's rowing, men's and women's soccer, softball, men's and women's Swimming, men's and women's tennis, men's and women's track and field, and women's volleyball. In addition to varsity sports PLU offers men's rowing, men's lacrosse, and ultimate frisbee as club sports.

=== National championships ===
Championships won by the Lutes include:

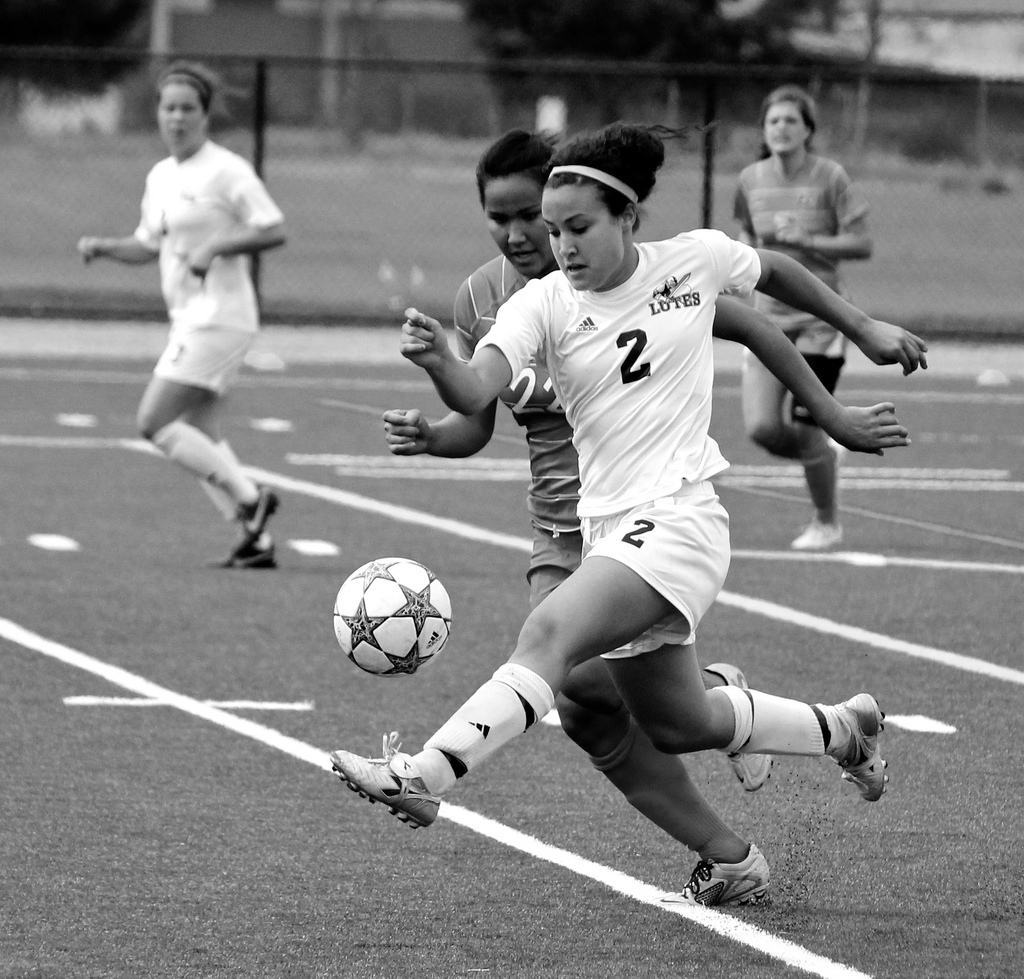
A women's soccer match in 2012; the program has won 3 championships

Year	Sport	Coach	Location	Ass./Div.
1980	Football	Frosty Westering	Tacoma, Washington	NAIA Division II
1987	Football	Frosty Westering	Tacoma, Washington	NAIA Division II
1988	Cross country (w)	Brad Moore	Kenosha, Wisconsin	NAIA
1988	Softball	Ralph Weekly	Oklahoma City, Oklahoma	NAIA
1988	Soccer (w)	Colleen Hacker	Abilene, Texas	NAIA
1989	Soccer (w)	Colleen Hacker	Due West, South Carolina	NAIA
1991	Soccer (w)	Colleen Hacker	Boca Raton, Florida	NAIA
1992	Softball	Ralph Weekly	Pensacola, Florida	NAIA
1993	Football	Frosty Westering	Portland, Oregon	NAIA Division II
1999	Football	Frosty Westering	Salem, Virginia	NCAA Division III
2010	Ultimate frisbee	Katie Silveria, Marissa Lyons	Appleton, Wisconsin	Division III
2012	Softball	Erin Van Nostrand	Salem, Virginia	NCAA Division III

== Traditions ==
During the academic processional at commencement, Processional of Joy by Dr. Lawrence J. Meyer is traditionally played by the University Symphony Orchestra. Composed as a unique ceremonial score in 1969, Processional of Joy has been played at each commencement since 1970.

== Notable alumni ==
=== Athletics ===
- Lisa Cole, professional soccer coach
- Chris Egan, sports anchor and reporter
- Ken Flajole, professional football coach
- Craig Fouhy, sports broadcaster and assistant college football coach
- Marv Harshman, college basketball coach
- Lucas Hatton, strongman
- Doug Herland, Olympic rower
- Megan Jendrick, Olympic swimmer
- Craig Kupp, National Football League quarterback
- Don Poier, sports broadcaster
- Scott Squires, Canadian Football League coach
- Kirk Talley, college football coach
- Marv Tommervik, professional football player and football coach at Pacific Lutheran
- Karen Weekly, college softball coach
- John Zamberlin, NFL football player with the New England Patriots and the Kansas City Chiefs, college football coach

=== Art and music ===
- Crystal Aikin, gospel singer-songwriter and reality television personality
- Angela Meade, operatic soprano
- Marissa Meyer, author
- Aaron Padilla, artist and art educator
- Michael Peterson, country music artist
- Connor Trinneer, actor

=== Business ===
- Brad Tilden, former CEO of Alaska Airlines

=== Law and politics ===
- Joyce A. Barr, diplomat
- Lois Capps, member of the United States House of Representatives
- Jane Gillette, dentist and member of the Montana House of Representatives
- Calvin Goings, Washington state senator
- Rick Larsen, member of the U.S. House of Representatives
- Jack Metcalf, member of the U.S. House of Representatives
- John Nilson, Canadian politician; member of the Legislative Assembly of Saskatchewan
- Sean Parnell, lawyer and former governor of Alaska
- Jan Shabro, member of the Washington House of Representatives
- Sue Rieke Smith, member of the Oregon House of Representatives

=== Science and medicine ===
- William Foege, physician and epidemiologist who is credited with "devising the global strategy that led to the eradication of smallpox in the late 1970s"
- Martin W. Johnson, marine biologist and author
- Marvin Ronning, senior administrator at the Rhode Island Free Clinic
- Gene Strandness, pioneer in the field of vascular surgery and "founding father" of the University of Washington School of Medicine and Medical Center
- David B. Wake, professor of integrative biology at UC Berkeley and expert on speciation
- Scott Ransom, physician, researcher, and teacher; former president at University of North Texas Health Science Center
- Neil L. Kelleher, chemist and biologist

=== Other ===
- Lute Jerstad, mountaineer and mountain guide and one of the first Americans to climb Mount Everest
- Rosanna Pansino, YouTuber and cookbook author
