= Ole Grönsberg =

American pastor and academic administrator

Ole N. Grønsberg was a pastor, second president of Pacific Lutheran University (PLU) and a travelling missionary.

Grønsberg graduated from Luther College in Decorah, Iowa and trained at Concordia Seminary in St. Louis, Missouri. He was ordained in 1880 and was pastor of Our Saviour's Lutheran Church in San Francisco. He became PLU president, succeeding Bjug Harstad, on October 3, 1895 where he was an advisory member of the Board of Trustees and taught World History. He resigned after two years and went on to be a travelling missionary in California.
