= 1974 NCAA Division I soccer tournament =

1974 College Cup

Tournament details
- Country: United States
- Venue(s): Busch Memorial Stadium; St. Louis, Missouri
- Teams: 24

Final positions
- Champions: Howard (1st title)
- Runners-up: Saint Louis
- Third place: Hartwick
- Fourth place: UCLA

Tournament statistics
- Matches played: 23
- Goals scored: 85 (3.7 per match)
- Top goal scorer(s): Dale Russell, Philadelphia Textile (6)

The 1974 NCAA Division I soccer tournament was the 16th annual tournament organized by the National Collegiate Athletic Association to determine the national champion of men's college soccer among its Division I members in the United States.

The final match was played at the first Busch Memorial Stadium in St. Louis, Missouri on December 7.

Howard won their first national title by defeating two-time defending champion Saint Louis in the championship game, 2–1 after four overtimes.

== Qualifying ==
Four teams made their debut appearances in the NCAA Division I soccer tournament: Bucknell, George Washington, Indiana, and St. Francis (NY).

== Tournament ==
First round
Connecticut	4
Bridgeport	1
Brown	5
Harvard	1
Hartwick	1
Oneonta	0
Cornell	4
St. Francis (NY)	2
Howard	2
George Washington	0
Clemson (2OT)	3
Navy	2
Philadelphia Textile	4
Fairleigh Dickinson	2
Penn State	0
Bucknell	1

Second round
Connecticut (3OT)	4
Brown	3
Hartwick (4OT)	3
Cornell	2
Howard	1
Clemson	0
Philadelphia Textile	1
Bucknell	0
SIU Edwardsville	2
Indiana	0
Saint Louis	1
Cleveland State	0
UCLA (3OT)	3
San Jose State	2
San Francisco	3
Chico State	1

Quarterfinals
Connecticut	0
Hartwick	2
Howard	5
Philadelphia Textile	3
SIU Edwardsville	1
Saint Louis (3OT)	2
UCLA	1
San Francisco	0

Semifinals
Hartwick	1
Howard	2
Saint Louis (2OT)	2
UCLA	1

Championship
Howard	2****
Saint Louis	1

== Championship Rounds ==
=== Third-Place Final ===
Hartwick College	3–1	UCLA

=== Final ===
January 4, 1975

Howard	2–1 (4OT)	Saint Louis

Busch Memorial Stadium, St. Louis, Missouri
Attendance: 2,921

== See also ==
- 1974 NCAA Division II Soccer Championship
- 1974 NCAA Division III Soccer Championship
- 1974 NAIA Soccer Championship
