= 1971 NAIA soccer championship =

1971 NAIA Soccer Championship

Tournament details
- Country: United States
- Venue: Dunn, North Carolina
- Teams: 8

Final positions
- Champions: Quincy (IL) (3rd title)
- Runners-up: Davis & Elkins
- Third place: Ottawa (KS)
- Fourth place: Westmont

Tournament statistics
- Matches played: 10
- Goals scored: 39 (3.9 per match)

Awards
- Best player: Al Harte, Quincy (IL)

The 1971 NAIA Soccer Championship was the 13th annual tournament held by the NAIA to determine the national champion of men's college soccer among its members in the United States.

In a rematch of the previous year's final, Quincy (IL) defeated defending champions Davis & Elkins in the final, 1–0, to claim the Hawks' third NAIA national title.

For the second consecutive year, the final was played in Dunn, North Carolina.

== Qualification ==
For the fourth year, the tournament field remained fixed at eight teams. Unlike the previous three years, however, additional fifth- and seventh-place finals were not contested.

Qualified Teams
School	Appearance	Last Bid
Davis & Elkins	4th	1970
Erskine	1st	Never
Goshen	1st	Never
Keene State	1st	Never
Newark Engineering	3rd	1961
Ottawa (KS)	3rd	1970
Quincy (IL)	5th	1970
Westmont	4th	1970

== Bracket ==
Fifth place
Fifth place match not held
Newark Engineering
Keene State
Seventh place
Seventh place match not held
Goshen
Erskine

Consolation semifinals
Newark Engineering	6
Goshen	1
Keene State	4
Erskine	2

First round
Ottawa (KS)	2
Newark Engineering	1
Davis & Elkins	3
Goshen	1
Quincy (IL)	8
Keene State	1
Westmont	3
Erskine	2

Championship semifinals
Ottawa (KS)	0
Davis & Elkins	2
Quincy (IL)	1
Westmont	0

Championship
Dunn, NC
Davis & Elkins	0
Quincy (IL)	1
Third place
Ottawa (KS)	1
Westmont	0

== See also ==
- 1971 NCAA soccer tournament
