= Seth C. Eastvold =

American theologian and college president

Seth Clarence Eastvold (December 19, 1895 – 1963) was an American theologian.

Born in Chicago, Illinois, he graduated from Jewell College in 1913, received his undergraduate degree from St. Olaf College in 1916 and went on to graduate from Luther Theological Seminary four years later. Continuing his education, Eastvold went to Augustana College and Seminary where he earned his B.D. (1924), S.T.M. (1926), and S.T.D. (1931). He then served in several Lutheran parishes throughout the Midwest over a twenty-three-year time span.

During this time, he also wrote five different books: Immortality – Intermediate State and Final Issue (1930), Rev. C. J. Eastvold, D.D. – His Life and Work (1930), Paul and Luther (1937), The Meaning and Practice of the Rite of Confirmation in the Lutheran Church (1936), and Beyond the Grave (1942), along with various brochures and articles on theological subjects.

Eastvold became president of Pacific Lutheran College in 1943 and stayed until 1962 during which time many buildings were built on campus, student enrollment increased by over one thousand, the university’s assets increased by millions, and PLU became one of the largest schools of The Lutheran Church. Credited with reviving a dying school, Eastvold chose the motto “Build for Character,” which could be seen at the entrance to campus. This motto was integrated into every aspect of college life: intellectual, social, physical, cultural, and religious.

Eastvold went on a six-month leave of absence in 1958 and he and his wife travelled to Europe, Africa, India, Taiwan, and Japan. While in Africa, he conferred an honorary doctorate on Albert Schweitzer, possibly the only American university to have conferred this degree on Schweitzer. During his trip around the world, he saw many institutions similar to PLC that were called universities and he was determined that PLC also become a university. So in 1960, PLC attained university status adopting its original name Pacific Lutheran University with a new University Seal implemented.

While maintaining his presidency at Pacific Lutheran University, Eastvold served as the first vice president of the Evangelical Lutheran Church from 1948 until 1960. In 1952, he was the delegate to the Lutheran World Federation convention in Germany and then again in Minneapolis, Minnesota, in 1957. Eastvold retired from his position as president of Pacific Lutheran University in July 1962. He and his wife, Enga Olena Eastvold, whom he married in 1918, moved to California, where he became the executive vice president of the California Lutheran Education Foundation. Later that year, he became acting president of California Lutheran College.

In February 1963, less than one year after having left Pacific Lutheran University, Dr. Eastvold was stricken by a cerebral hemorrhage in Minnesota where he was attending a meeting for Lutheran college presidents. He was not able to regain consciousness and died shortly thereafter.

The Chapel-Music-Speech Building built in 1952 was renamed Eastvold Chapel in 1962 to honor the seventh president of the school. The building was renamed again in 2013 as the Karen Hille Phillips Center for the Performing Arts and the auditorium was named Eastvold Auditorium.
