= 1974 NCAA Division II soccer tournament =

Tournament details
- Country: United States
- Teams: 16

Final positions
- Champions: Adelphi (1st title)
- Runners-up: Seattle Pacific (1st title game)
- Third place: Federal City College

Tournament statistics
- Matches played: 16
- Goals scored: 65 (4.06 per match)

The 1974 NCAA Division II soccer tournament was the third annual tournament held by the NCAA to determine the top men's Division II college soccer program in the United States.

With the introduction of a separate Division III tournament this year, the Division II tournament field decreased from 25 to 16 teams.

Adelphi defeated Seattle Pacific in the final match, 3–2, to win their first national title.

The final was played at the University of Missouri St. Louis in St. Louis, Missouri on November 30, 1974.

== Bracket ==
First round
Adelphi	3
Babson	0
Springfield	5
WPI	0
Loyola Maryland	2
East Stroudsburg State	0
Baltimore	3
Federal City College	5
Eastern Illinois	2
Illinois Chicago	0
Western Illinois	2
UMSL	1
Cal State Fullerton	3
UC Riverside	1
Cal State Hayward	2
Seattle Pacific	3

Quarterfinals
Adelphi	1
Springfield	0
Loyola Maryland	2
Federal City College	3
Eastern Illinois	2
Western Illinois	1
Cal State Fullerton	1
Seattle Pacific	2

Semifinals
Adelphi	3
Federal City College	0
Eastern Illinois	2
Seattle Pacific	3****

Championship
Adelphi	3
Seattle Pacific	2
Third place
Federal City College	5
Eastern Illinois	3

== Final ==
November 30, 1974

Adelphi	3–2	Seattle Pacific
Charles O'Donnell,,	Report 1 Report 2	Kit Zell 71:42' (Covell), 75:41'

University of Missouri–St. Louis, St. Louis, Missouri

== See also ==
- 1974 NCAA Division I soccer tournament
- 1974 NCAA Division III soccer tournament
- 1974 NAIA soccer tournament
