= Kit Zell =

American soccer player

Christopher Brian "Kit" Zell
Personal information
- Date of birth: August 19, 1954 (age 72)
- Place of birth: Seattle, Washington, United States
- Position: Forward

College career
Years	Team	Apps	(Gls)
1972–1975	Seattle Pacific Falcons		

Senior career*
Years	Team	Apps	(Gls)
1976	Portland Timbers	2	(0)
- * Club domestic league appearances and goals

Christopher Brian "Kit" Zell is a retired American soccer forward who played one season in the North American Soccer League.

Zell played collegiate soccer at Seattle Pacific University from 1972 to 1975. In 1976, the Portland Timbers selected Zell in the second round of the North American Soccer League draft. He played two games as an amateur with the Timbers that season. After his soccer career, Zell taught Healthy Living, Physical Education and Drivers Ed at the Bio/Med academy of Marysville Getchell High School.
