= Bjug Harstad =

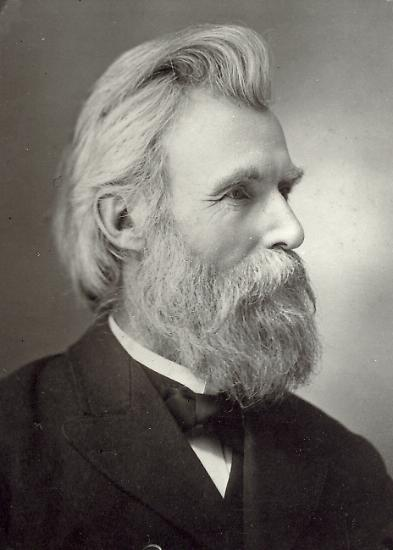
- Born: December 17, 1848; Setesdal, Norway
- Died: June 20, 1933 (aged 84)
- Relatives: Oscar Harstad (son)

Bjug Harstad (December 17, 1848 – June 20, 1933) was a Lutheran pastor, founding president of Pacific Lutheran University, and first president of the Evangelical Lutheran Synod.

== Biography ==
Bjug Aanondson was one of ten children born on the Harstad farm in Valle Municipality in Nedenes county, Norway. In 1861 his family emigrated to the United States. Bjug was a student at Luther College from 1865 to 1871. He studied theology at Concordia Seminary in St. Louis from 1871 to 1874. It was his experiences there that became the model for the rest of his scholarly and religious life. After seminary, he traveled as a pastor to remote areas of Minnesota, where he built schools and churches.

Harstad married Guro Svensdatter Omlid in 1877. From 1877 to 1891 he was pastor in Mayville and missionary in the Red River Valley of North Dakota. He was the founder of seventeen congregations; president of the Minnesota District of the Norwegian Synod (1884-1892); and founder of three academies: Franklin School (1878), Gran Boarding School (1880), and the Bruflat Academy (1889), all in North Dakota.

The Lutheran Church sent Harstad to the Pacific Coast in 1889 to start a school. He visited Portland, Seattle, and Tacoma. It was decided that Brookdale, (now Parkland) in Pierce County, Washington, should be the Lutheran education center of the Northwest. Pacific Lutheran University Association was formed on December 11, 1890. Harstad was elected president of the association, and the Norwegian Synod formed a new Pacific District in June 1893. Harstad resigned his position as president of the Minnesota District, and acquired additional responsibilities by being elected president of the new Pacific District. He spent a considerable amount of time traveling to supervise the new far-reaching district and to raise money for the university.

The cornerstone laying was held in 1891 and Old Main was completed in 1894. Pacific Lutheran University opened for classes on October 25, 1894, with 30 students. Harstad taught religion, Latin, German, and Norwegian. On October 3, 1895, Harstad stepped down from the presidency at the university and was replaced by Rev. Ole Grönsberg from San Francisco. After leaving the university, Harstad traveled through the Willamette Valley, ministering to churchless Norwegian immigrants. He then stayed in San Francisco serving the congregation that Grønsberg had left, which had had some difficulty securing a new pastor. In addition, Harstad spent much of this time attempting to persuade people to help the university pay off its debt. President Grønsberg resigned in April 1897, and Harstad was reelected president and served for the next year.

By 1898 gold had been discovered in Alaska, and Harstad became excited by the prospects of finding a fortune there. In February of the same year Harstad and Parkland resident Otis Larson left for Alaska on the SS City of Seattle. Harstad and Larson landed in Dyea, Alaska, and lived in a tent in sub-zero weather. They eventually staked a claim at Dawson City in the Yukon. The two men encountered adventurers, cold, mud, irreligion, and human vagaries, but no gold. After a year and a half, Harstad and Larson returned. Harstad continued as a member of the Board of Trustees until 1900, when his term was completed.

In 1917, the Norwegian Synod, which had founded Pacific Lutheran University, merged with the United Norwegian Lutheran Church of America and the Hauge Synod to celebrate the four hundredth anniversary of the Reformation. Harstad refused to join the new Norwegian Lutheran Church of America, thus formally separating himself from the school he had founded. From 1917 until 1922, Bjug Harstad served as president of the Evangelical Lutheran Synod. Harstad died on June 20, 1933, at age 84. His wife Guro, eight of his children, and eleven grandchildren survived him. A granite monument was dedicated to him in Valle, Norway on June 26, 1983. One of his sons, Oscar Harstad, played major League Baseball with the Cleveland Indians in 1915.

== See also ==
- The Norwegian Lutheran Church in the United States

== Other sources ==
- Harstad, Bjug A. (1930) A Brief History of Valle, Saetersdal, Norway and of some families from there (Parkland, Wash)
- Norlie, Olaf Morgan, Knut Seehuus (1915) Norsk lutherske prester i Amerika, 1843-1915

== Related reading ==
- Gavett, Joseph L. (2007) North Dakota Immigrants: Coming to America (Watchmaker Publishing, Ltd) ISBN 9781929148745
- Lovoll, Odd Sverre (1984) The Promise of America: A History of the Norwegian-American People (Minneapolis: University of Minnesota Press) ISBN 0-8166-1331-1
- Nelson, E. Clifford, and Fevold, Eugene L. (1960) The Lutheran Church among Norwegian-Americans: a history of the Evangelical Lutheran Church (Augsburg Publishing House)
- Stephenson, George M (1926) Norwegian-American Lutheran Church History (Northfield, MN: The Norwegian-American Historical Association)
