= J. U. Xavier =

Norwegian-American educator

Johan Ulrik Xavier
- Born: 26 June 1870; Lyngen, Norway
- Died: 13 September 1963 (aged 93); Stanwood, Washington, U.S.

Johan Ulrik Xavier (1870–1963) was born to Nils Paul and Amanda Magdalene Xavier on 26 June 1870 in Lyngen Municipality in Troms county, Norway. His family was Sami. The second son of a family of ten, he and his family immigrated to the United States three years after his birth. They became naturalized citizens in 1878.

Johan Ulrik was first educated in a rural elementary school and then moved on to Luther College Preparatory, and got his Bachelor of Arts degree in 1893 from Luther College. He earned his Theological Degree from Luther Seminary in Saint Paul, Minnesota in 1898 and did graduate work during the summers at both the University of Minnesota and the University of Washington, which ended with a Master of Arts Degree from the University of Washington in 1929.

He was hired at Pacific Lutheran Academy in 1908 as the school librarian and continued working until the school closed in 1918. He then earned his living at a number of odd jobs and eventually settled down to work at a wholesale grocers' named Younglove.

When the school re-opened in 1920 Xavier returned and because he was now the most senior member of the staff, he acted as president for the first year of the newly named Pacific Lutheran College. From 1921 until he retired in 1942, Xavier taught history, Bible, Augsburg Confession, Latin, Greek, nutrition, library science, botany and zoology as well as serving as the school's librarian. He also served as a pastor all over the Northwest.

It was at Pacific Lutheran Academy that Dr. Xavier met his future wife, Signe Skattebol, who was a teacher and the women's basketball coach. He proposed to her in 1910 and they married on 27 December 1912.

Xavier received an honorary Doctorate of Divinity degree from Pacific Lutheran College in 1953.

The library built in 1937 was renamed Xavier Hall in 1967 to honor the fourth president of the school.
