= Scott Squires (American football) =

American gridiron football player and coach

Playing career
- 1984–1987: Pacific Lutheran

Coaching career (HC unless noted)
- 1989–1995: Cal Lutheran (LB)
- 1996–2006: Cal Lutheran
- 2007: Edmonton Eskimos (ST)
- 2008–2010: Montreal Alouettes (ST)

Head coaching record
- Overall: 54–45

Accomplishments and honors

Championships
- 1 SCIAC (1997)

Scott Squires is an American retired football coach and former player. He served as the head football coach at California Lutheran University from 1996 to 2006, compiling a career coaching record of 54–45. As the head coach at Cal Lutheran, Squires recruited both Dave Aranda and Texas head coach Tom Herman. Squires later was a special teams coordinator in the Canadian Football League (CFL), spending a year with the Edmonton Eskimos (2007) and two years with the Montreal Alouettes.

== Head coaching record ==
Year	Team	Overall	Conference	Standing	Bowl/playoffs
Cal Lutheran Kingsmen (Southern California Intercollegiate Athletic Conference) (1996–2006)
1996	Cal Lutheran	3–6	2–3	T–3rd	
1997	Cal Lutheran	5–4	4–1	T–1st	
1998	Cal Lutheran	5–4	2–3	T–3rd	
1999	Cal Lutheran	3–6	3–2	3rd	
2000	Cal Lutheran	3–6	1–4	T–5th	
2001	Cal Lutheran	6–3	3–2	T–2nd	
2002	Cal Lutheran	4–5	3–2	3rd	
2003	Cal Lutheran	5–4	4–2	T–2nd	
2004	Cal Lutheran	6–3	4–2	2nd	
2005	Cal Lutheran	8–1	5–1	2nd	
2006	Cal Lutheran	6–3	3–3	T–3rd	
Cal Lutheran:		54–45	34–25		
Total:		54–45			
National championship Conference title Conference division title or championship game berth
