= Seattle Pacific University =

Christian university in Seattle, Washington, US

- Former names: Seattle Seminary (1891–1913); Seattle Seminary and College (1913–1915); Seattle Pacific College (1915–1977)
- Motto: Engaging the Culture, Changing the World
- Type: Private university
- Established: 1891; 135 years ago
- Affiliations: CIC; CCCU; CCC
- Religious affiliation: Free Methodist Church
- Endowment: $149.4 million (2025)
- President: Deana L. Porterfield
- Students: 2,101 (2025)
- Undergraduates: 1,657 (2025)
- Postgraduates: 428 (2025)
- Location: Seattle, Washington, U.S. 47°39′01″N 122°21′42″W
- Campus: Urban, 43 acres (170,000 m^{2})
- Colors: Maroon and white
- Nickname: Falcons
- Sporting affiliations: NCAA Division II – GNAC
- Mascot: Talon the Falcon
- Website: spu.edu
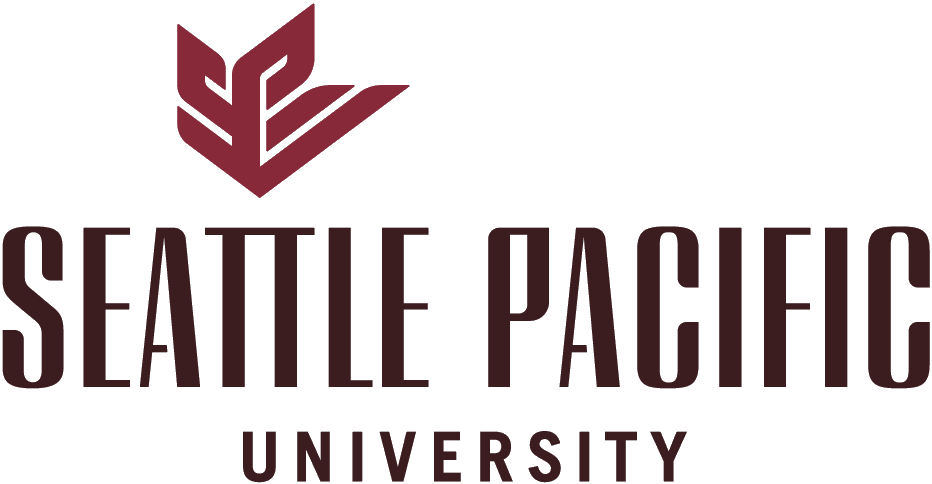

Seattle Pacific University (SPU) is a private Christian university in Seattle, Washington, United States. It was founded in 1891 in conjunction with the Oregon and Washington Conference of the Free Methodist Church as the Seattle Seminary. It became the Seattle Seminary and College in 1913, adopted the name Seattle Pacific College two years later, and received its current name in 1977.

== History ==
Seattle Pacific College in its first year with the new name, 1915.

Seattle Pacific University was founded in 1891 by Free Methodist pioneers to train missionaries for overseas service. Built on land donated by Mr. and Mrs. Nels B. Peterson, the neighborhood was originally known as Ross Station and was annexed to Seattle the same year the college was founded; the school was colloquially referred to as the Ross Seminary during this era. The first permanent building built on campus, designed by John B. Parkinson, was completed in early 1893 and the seminary held its first classes that Spring.

In May 2022, the university's board of trustees voted to keep rules in place that ban LGBTQ people from becoming employees, prompting student protests. The vote by the board of trustees occurred in wake of faculty voting with an 80% majority no-confidence in the board regarding this issue. Washington Attorney General Bob Ferguson announced on July 29 that his office was investigating the university's hiring practices, describing them as potentially illegal and discriminatory. In turn, the university filed a lawsuit against the attorney general, saying that the investigation violates its religious freedom. In September 2022, multiple faculty, students, and staff brought a lawsuit against the board for breach of fiduciary duty, a suit that was later dismissed on all but one count.

On June 16, 2023, the university's interim president, Peter Menjares, announced in an email to faculty that it would cut 40 percent of its budget academic programs via steep faculty layoffs; university leadership blamed post-COVID-19 pandemic national trends in higher education for declining enrollment, while faculty blamed the university's anti-LGBTQ+ faculty policy for exacerbating the issue. Roberts Wesleyan University president Deanna Porterfield became president at Seattle Pacific University later that year. In November 2024, Porterfield announced further academic cuts, eliminating 19 more majors and cutting more faculty through layoffs, effective by June 2025.

=== Previous names ===
As the school developed from a seminary of the Free Methodist Church to its current status as a doctoral degree granting institution, its name has changed over time to befit its changes in status:

- 1891 – Seattle Seminary
- 1913 – Seattle Seminary and College
- 1915 – Seattle Pacific College/Seattle Pacific Christian College
- 1977 – Seattle Pacific University

=== 2014 shooting ===
On June 5, 2014, a shooting occurred in the Otto Miller Hall, during which one student was killed and two other students were injured. The suspect, who lived in Mountlake Terrace, Washington at the time, was not a student at the school and had no connection to the university. On November 16, 2016, the gunman was convicted in the shooting and sentenced to 112 years in prison.

== Academics ==
Academic rankings

National
- Forbes: 289
- U.S. News & World Report: 196
- Washington Monthly: 195
- WSJ/College Pulse: 343

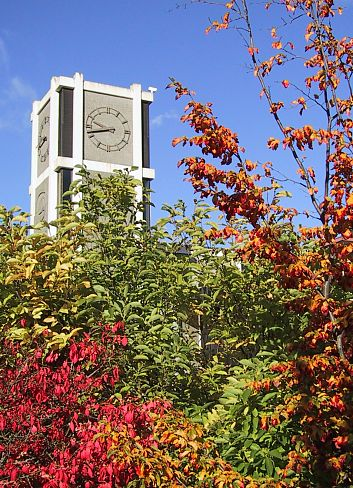
The SPU Clock Tower

The university's academic programs are divided into three colleges and a seminary:

- College of Applied and Natural Sciences
- College of Business and Technology
- College of Humanities, Education, and the Arts
- Seattle Pacific Seminary

=== Honors program ===
SPU offers a four-year alternate series of general education classes for honors students called University Scholars, in which every student double-majors, earning a major in "Honors: Liberal Arts" as well as another major of their choice. Their honors coursework involves classes centering the question "What does it mean to be human?", on cultural and social systems, ethics and critical reasoning, and history; by their senior year honors students write senior research thesis. Along with the preliminary core classes, the curriculum includes two Faith & Science classes and a Christianity & Scholarship class. Students in the program takes their sequence of University Scholars courses with the same cohort of 40 students for the entire four years. A student may be admitted to the program regardless of major. There are no University Scholars classes scheduled for the fall of junior year so students have the opportunity to study abroad.

== Enrollment ==
As of the 2025 autumn quarter, 2,101 students were enrolled. This included 1,657 undergraduate students, 16 post-baccalaureate students, and 428 graduate students. There were also 747 continuing education students enrolled in the previous year (2024-2025). Eighty percent of autumn quarter 2025 undergraduate classes had enrollments of 30 or less and the university had a student-faculty Ratio of 15:1 based on the Common Data Set definition.

== Campus ==
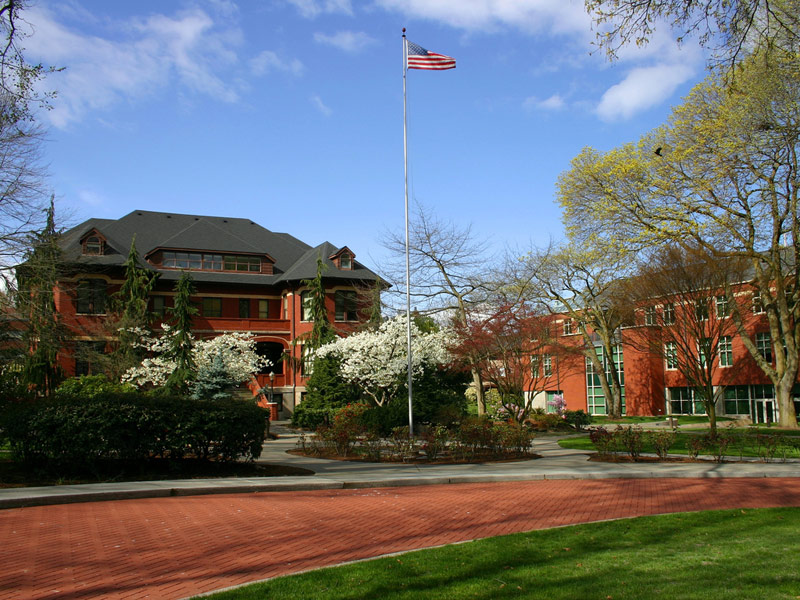
SPU Tiffany Loop

The university sits on a 43-acre campus at the northern end of Queen Anne Hill, near the Fremont neighborhood and approximately four miles north of downtown Seattle. Many of the trees on the campus' central Tiffany Loop are among the oldest in the city. SPU also owns and operates a satellite campus: a wilderness field station specializing in biology on Blakely Island in the San Juan Islands. Notable buildings on the Seattle campus include:

=== Alexander and Adelaide Hall ===
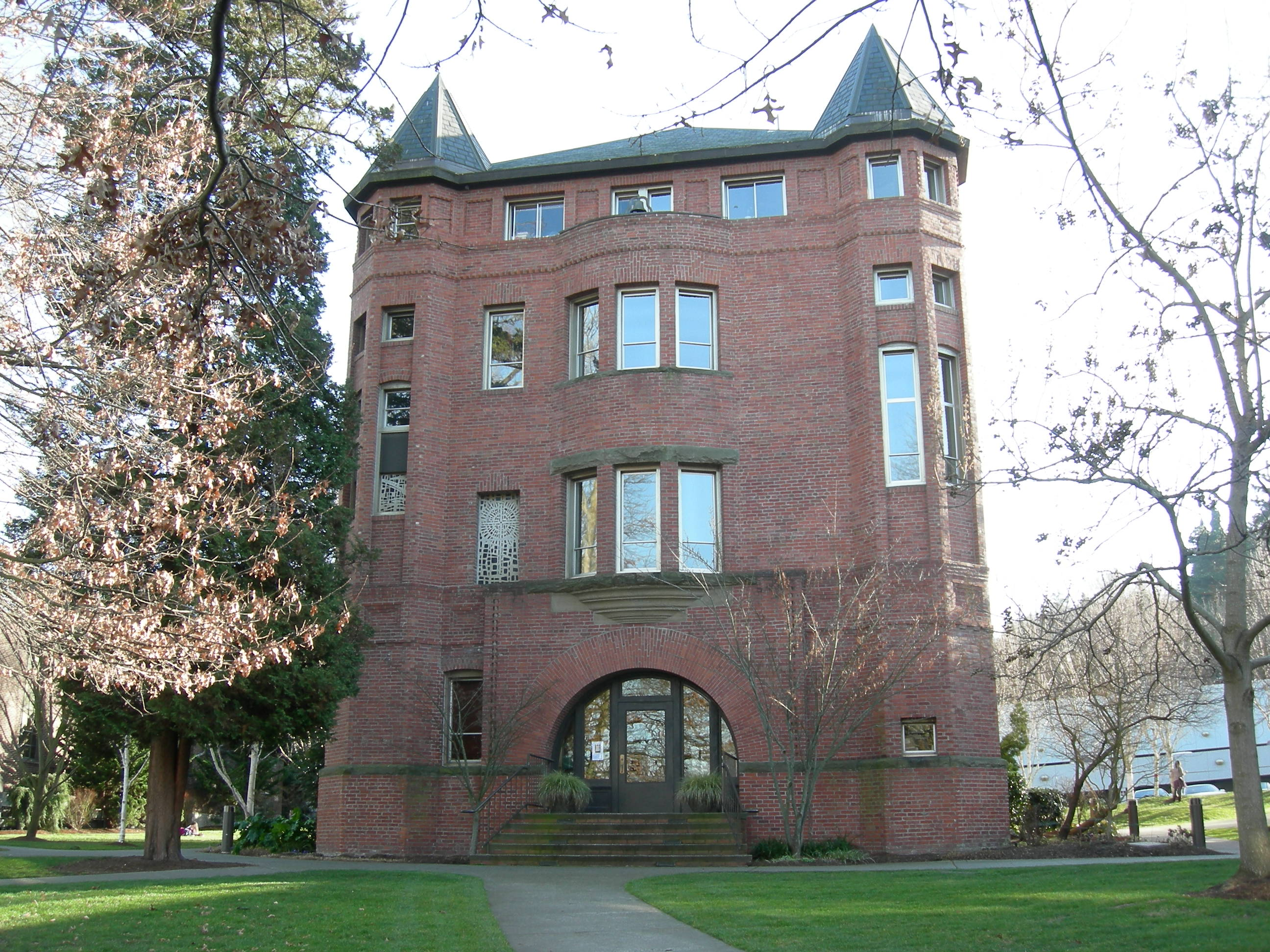
Alexander Hall

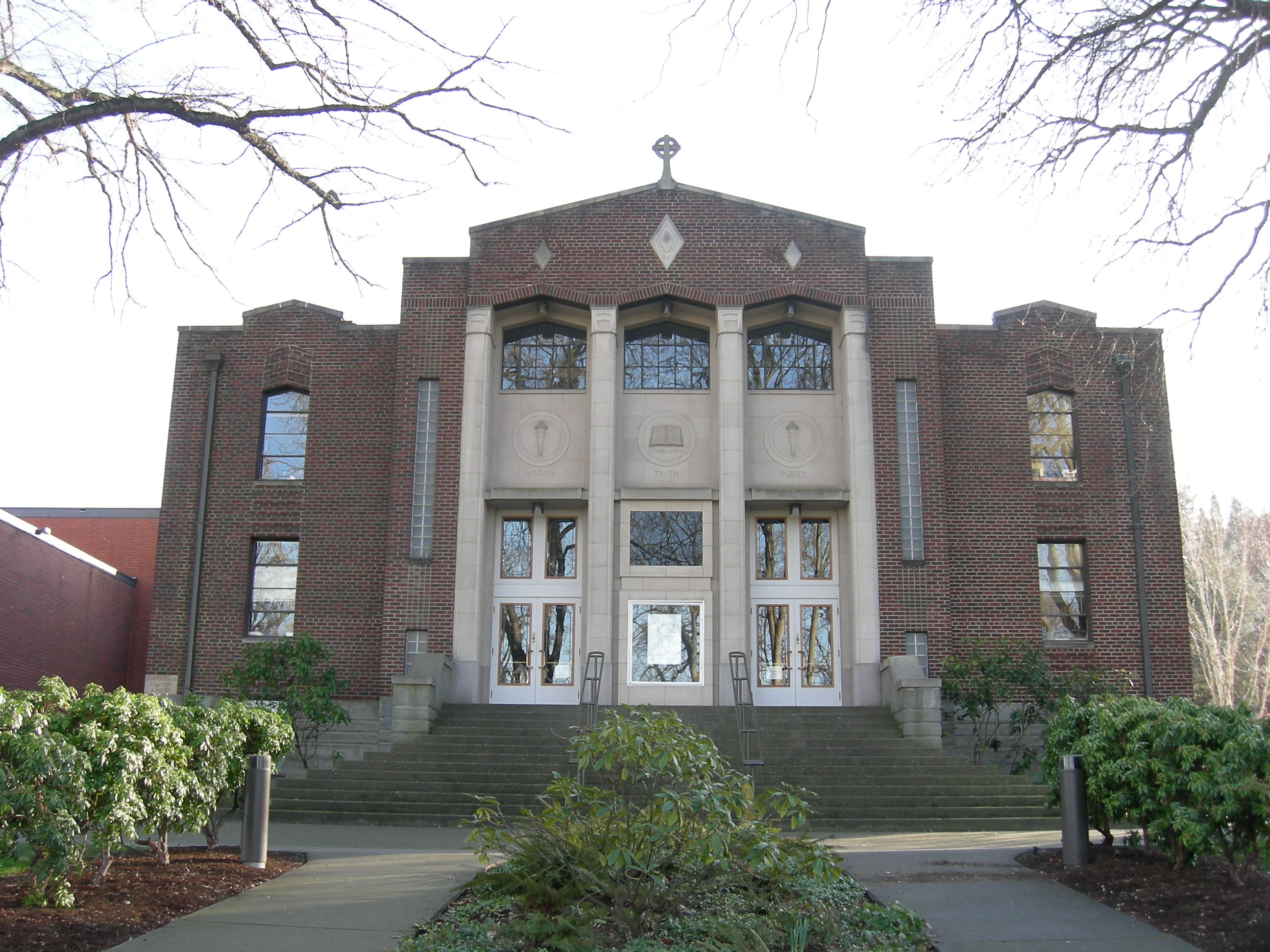
McKinley Theater

Named for the first president of Seattle Pacific University, Alexander Beers, this four-story brick building is home to the School of Theology. The founder's first name, Alexander, was used, as the board did not want a building on campus called Beers Hall. The building also houses the Sociology and History departments within the College of Arts and Sciences. Completed in early 1893, Alexander Hall is the oldest building on campus, and at the time of the university's founding was the campus' only building. It was designed by architect John B. Parkinson, who was responsible for the designs of many of Seattle's school buildings built during this era. Upon completion of Peterson Hall in 1905, it was used for a time as a boys dormitory. A $6.2-million A seismic retrofitting and renovation of the interior office space and chapel was completed in 2014. Next door to Alexander is the main performing arts space on campus, the McKinley Theater.

=== Demaray Hall/Clocktower ===
Demaray Hall is the central academic building at Seattle Pacific University, housing numerous classrooms as well as the Office of Undergraduate Admissions, Student Academic Services and Student Financial Services. Administrative offices, including the offices of the president and provost, are also located in Demaray. The building is named for Calvin Dorr Demaray, president of SPU from 1959 to 1968 and pastor of First Free Methodist Church from 1948 to 1959.

The clocktower in front of Demaray Hall was given to Seattle Pacific University by the class of 1966. It displays a bas-relief sculpture designed by former Professor of Art Ernst Schwidder, titled "Science, Religion and Humanities," which was brought to fruition by former Professor of Art Larry Metcalf and three of his students. The cast-stone relief panels depict various areas of study: the physical sciences, social sciences and humanities. Its symbols are drawn from American Pima, Arabic, Aztec, Babylonian, Egyptian and Greek cultures.

=== Gwinn Commons ===
Gwinn Commons

Gwinn Commons is home to three different points of interest. The Crossroads at Gwinn Commons is the main dining hall on campus. Upstairs is the university's main, multi-use location. A pair of large rooms, the Queen Anne Room (named after the neighborhood in which SPU is located) and the Cascade Room (named after the mountain range that can be seen from Upper Gwinn Commons) can each hold up to 500 people. Multiple functions are held in Upper Gwinn, ranging from Group (a Wednesday night worship service), admissions events, lectures, board meetings and more. The President's Dining room is also located here. In addition, there is the Corner Place Market, or C-Store, which holds Einstein Bros. Bagels and also a market where students can purchase various daily necessities. Wells Gwinn, for whom the dining facility is named, served 32 years on the Seattle Pacific Board of Trustees.

=== Ames Library ===
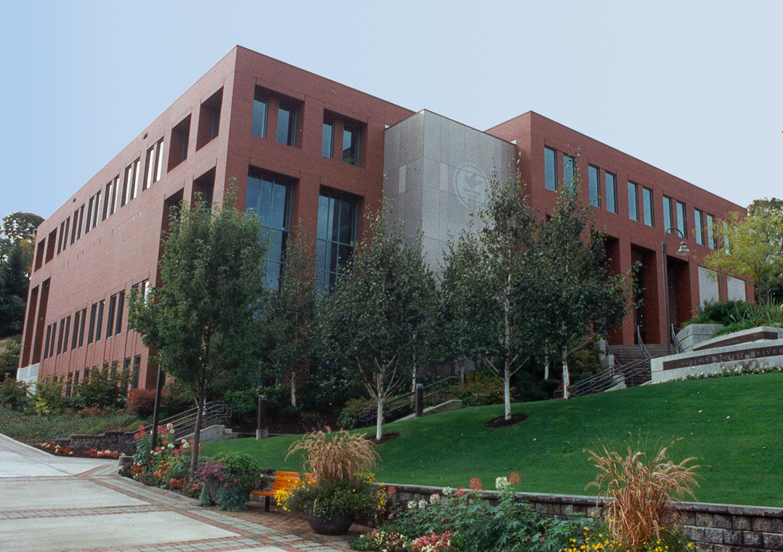
Ames Library (View from Lower Campus)

The Ames Library was completed in 1994. Housing over 250,000 volumes and 1,300 print periodicals, it grows by 6,000 new titles a year. Students, faculty, and alumni have access to the collections of Summit and the Orbis Cascade Alliance, comprising over 30 million items held in Washington and Oregon academic libraries, including the University of Washington.

=== Peterson Hall ===
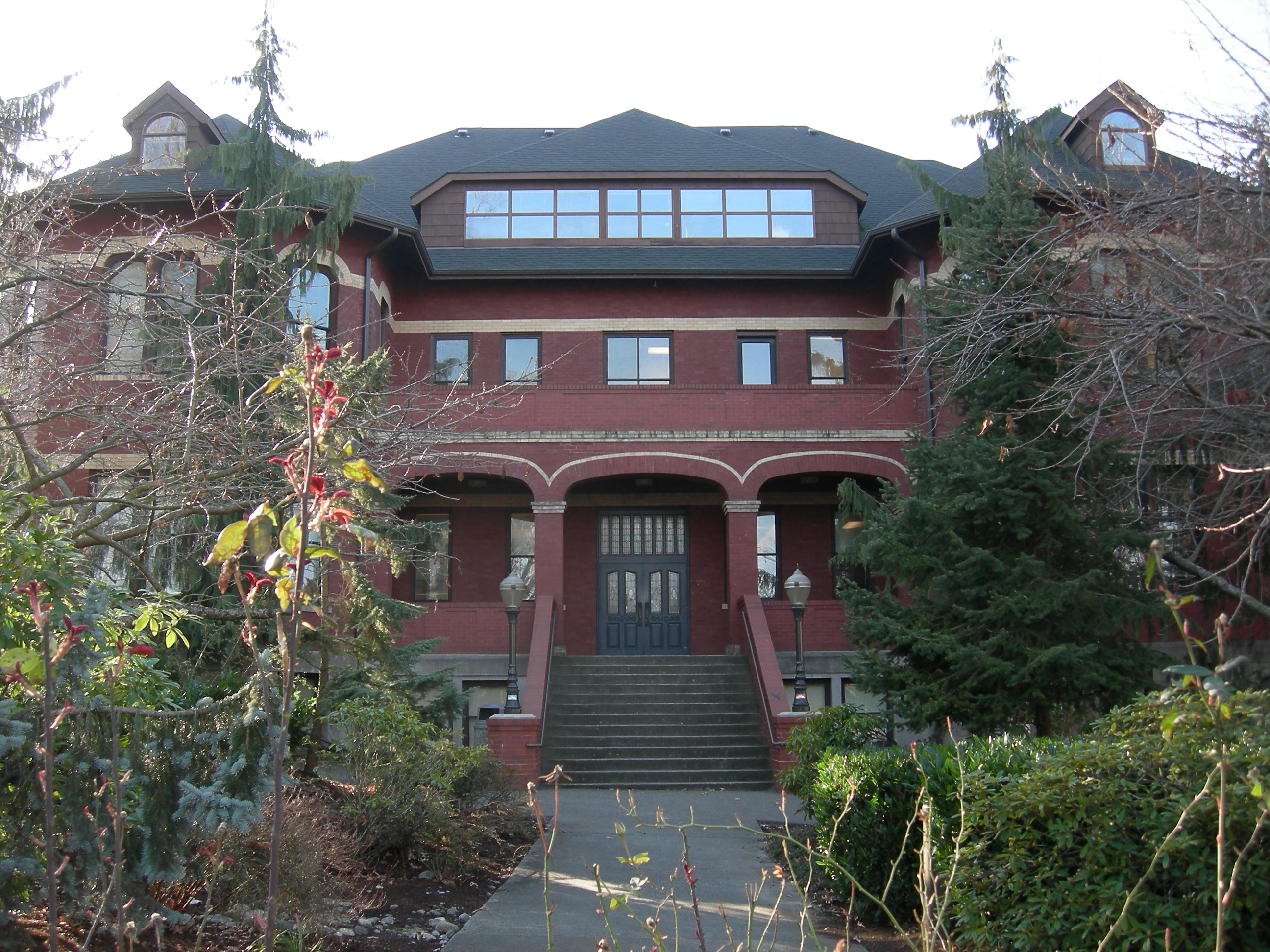
Peterson Hall

Opened in 1905, Peterson Hall is the second-oldest building on campus and houses the School of Education as well as the Department of Family and Consumer Sciences. Originally built to house administration and additional classrooms, it was designed by Seattle architect William Jewett. In the basement is a food lab, as well as a sewing lab. Each month, SPU's food lab plays host to a Community Kitchen - an outreach to the city's homeless population wherein these individuals join with members of the university community in cooking and sharing a common meal.

=== Student Union Building ===
The Student Union Building (commonly known as the "SUB") was built in the 1960s and still serves as a central point where many students gather. On the first floor is the Pacific Collegium, a hub for commuter students. Dining options provided by the on campus dining services can also be found in the SUB. UNICOM, a student-run information desk assists with ticket sales, bus passes, pool passes, among other general information items. ASSP, the student government of SPU has its offices in the SUB along with STUB, the student event programming organization.

=== Philip W. and Sharon K. Eaton Hall ===
SPU's main hard sciences facility houses biology, chemistry and some psychology labs. Built in 2003, it is the most advanced building on campus, complete with an electron microscope, cold room, fully contained greenhouse and LEED Certification. This building is central to those students in the Pre-Professional Health Sciences programs. SPU's pre-med track has become widely known for its annual 90–100% acceptance into medical schools following graduation. On May 23, 2012, the SPU Board of Trustees announced that it named the building in honor of past SPU president Philip W. Eaton and his wife Sharon.

=== McKenna Hall ===
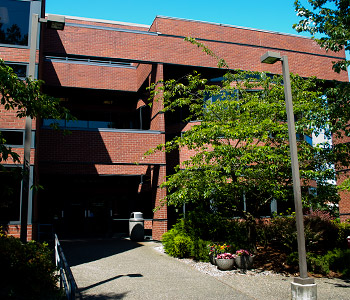
McKenna Hall

The School of Business, Government, and Economics (SBGE) is located in McKenna Hall. In addition to undergraduate degrees in management, accounting, economics, political science, and global development studies, SBGE also offers three graduate level degrees: Master of Business Administration, Master of Science in Information Management, and a Master of Arts in management. SBGE is home to the Center for Applied Learning and the Center for Integrity in Business which examines the intersections of theology and contemporary business.

=== Residences ===
Seattle Pacific University has five residence halls. The university offers other on-campus residence options, such as the Cremona and Wesley apartments, and other small suite- or apartment-style living facilities for continuing students. All residence halls feature single-gender floors. The five residence halls are Ashton Hall, Hill Hall, Moyer Hall, Emerson Hall, and Arnett Hall.

Freshmen are required to live on campus in the residence halls unless they are living with family. Meal plans are required for all students living in the dorms. Students may leave campus housing when they are 20 years old, have junior class status, have petitioned and been approved to live off campus by Campus Housing, or are graduate students.

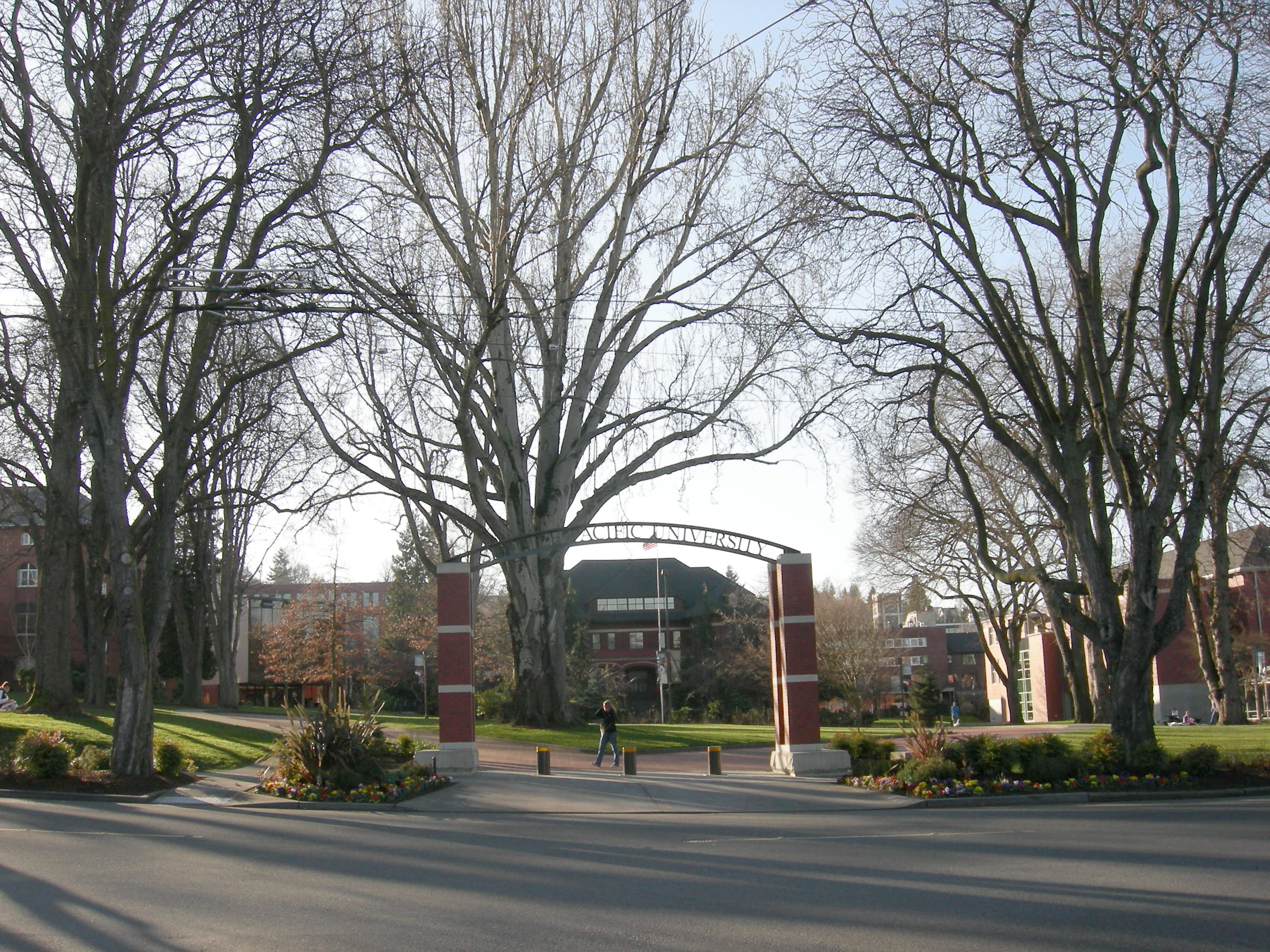
SPU Main Gate

- Arnett Hall welcomed its inaugural residents in Autumn 2014. As SPU's second smallest dorm with only four resident floors, it features suite-style single, double, and triple rooms, a main lounge on the first floor, and a green roof and roof deck on the fifth floor. Rooms on the upper floors may also feature views of the Lake Washington Ship Canal. It is located in the northwest corner of campus, just across the street from Demaray Hall and just down the hill from Gwinn Commons, SPU's dining hall.
- Ashton Hall, opened in 1965, is SPU's largest residence hall with more than 400 students on 6 floors. It was named in honor of Philip F. Ashton, PhD, a psychology professor (1929–1971). The hall is located on the highest point of SPU's campus. Many rooms have views of the campus and the Lake Washington Ship Canal. Annual Ashton Pop events include the Ashton Cup lip-sync contest, the Ashton Art Show, and a formal ball. In previous years the ball has been held at the Space Needle, on an Argosy Cruise, and at Seattle's W Hotel.
- Emerson Hall opened in 2001 and is the campus's second newest residence hall, featuring suite-style single, double, and triple rooms, card-access security, a main lounge with gas fireplace and Northwest wood beams, and an exercise center. Emerson also has a "Bridges Program", which lets students participate in intentional programs and conversations related to global issues and cross-cultural relationships. Emerson events include a quarterly Coffee House, the Emerson Film Festival, and the Spring Banquet. The hall is named for the street on which it resides.
- Hill Hall, which opened in 1962, located in the upper middle of the campus just steps from Gwinn Commons and the SPU Library, is known as the "family" hall for its comfortable atmosphere. It features a newly updated main lounge, the REX athletic center, and the Hill Hall "beach", a grassy area behind the hall popular for outdoor recreation and sunbathing. Hill Hall events include "Decade" Skate (a song-based skit competition), a retreat to Camp Casey, an annual ball, and 6th Hill "Beach Bash." It is named for the Reuben Hill family who donated property to the school for its expansion.
- Moyer Hall, opened in 1953 and remodeled in 1983, is located in the center of the campus on the edge of Tiffany Loop. The smallest of the traditional residence halls, Moyer was named in honor of Jacob Moyer, PhD, professor of chemistry and dean (1925–46). The hall's annual events include a fall retreat, an ice-broomball game, a citywide scavenger hunt, and an all-hall banquet. In the past, the ice-broomball game was played between residents of Moyer and Marston Hall (no longer used for housing).

The university owns multiple additional residences including Bailey, Cremona, 37 West Dravus, Falcon, Wesley and other buildings known by address rather than name are owned and maintained by SPU. These apartments are closer to campus but provide a more independent-living situation.

== Athletics ==
The university's athletic teams participate in the Great Northwest Athletic Conference at the Division II level of the NCAA.

Men's varsity athletics

- Basketball
- Cross country
- Soccer
- Track & field

Women's varsity athletics

- Basketball
- Cross country
- Rowing
- Soccer
- Track & field
- Volleyball

== Notable alumni ==
- Ken Bone, college basketball coach
- Jim Cornelison, singer
- Cross Makani Crabbe, politician
- Jake DeShazer, Doolittle raider, missionary to Japan
- Jason Farrell, professional soccer player
- Gordon Fee, professor of New Testament, biblical scholar, textual critic
- Chad Forcier, professional basketball coach
- Andrew Foster, pioneer of deaf education in Africa
- Robert A. Funk, business executive
- Gaylord T. Gunhus, 20th Chief of Chaplains of the United States Army
- Marcus Hahnemann, professional soccer player
- Doris Brown Heritage, cross-country runner
- Joseph Kearney, college athletic director
- Ali bin Ahmed Al Kuwari, Qatari Minister of Finance
- Conrad Lee, mayor of Bellevue, Washington
- Rodger Nishioka, Christian educator and professor of Christian education
- Nikkita Oliver, lawyer, non-profit administrator, educator, poet, and politician
- Eugene H. Peterson, author
- Dan Price, business executive
- Jeff Probst, television host
- Daniel Sandrin, professional basketball player
- Esther Snyder, business executive
- Jean Stothert, politician
- Larry Wall, programmer, linguist, author, and creator of the Perl programming language
- Turner Wiley, marathon runner
- David T. Wong, inventor
- Phil Zevenbergen, professional basketball player
- Kit Zell, soccer player
