= 1968 NAIA soccer championship =

1968 NAIA Soccer Championship

Tournament details
- Country: United States
- Venue(s): Quincy College; Quincy, Illinois
- Teams: 8

Final positions
- Champions: Davis & Elkins (1st title)
- Runners-up: Quincy (IL)
- Third place: Eastern Connecticut
- Fourth place: Plattsburgh State

Tournament statistics
- Matches played: 12
- Goals scored: 48 (4 per match)

Awards
- Best player: William Smyth, Davis & Elkins

The 1968 NAIA Soccer Championship was the tenth annual tournament held by the NAIA to determine the national champion of men's college soccer among its members in the United States.

Davis & Elkins defeated hosts and two-time defending champions Quincy (IL) in the final, 2–1 after five overtime periods, to claim the Senators' first NAIA national title. This was the first NAIA national championship game to go into extra time.

The final was again played at Quincy College in Quincy, Illinois.

== Qualification ==
The tournament field expanded for the first time in 1968, increasing from four to eight. The tournament format, meanwhile, remained single-elimination format, but added additional matches to determine the teams in fifth to eighth place, increasing the number of matches from 4 to 12.

== Bracket ==
Fifth place
Westmont	1
Earlham	4
Seventh place
St. Andrews (NC)	3
Rockhurst	1

Consolation semifinals
St. Andrews (NC)	0
Westmont	4
Earlham	4
Rockhurst	1

First round
Quincy (IL)	6
St. Andrews (NC)	1
Eastern Connecticut	4
Westmont	1
Davis & Elkins	3**
Earlham	2
Plattsburgh State	3
Rockhurst	1

Championship semifinals
Quincy (IL)	5
Eastern Connecticut	0
Davis & Elkins	1
Plattsburgh State	0

Championship
Quincy (IL)	1
Davis & Elkins	2*****
Third place
Eastern Connecticut	0**†
Plattburgh State	0

† Eastern Connecticut was awarded victory after two overtimes for having most corner kicks.

== See also ==
- 1968 NCAA soccer tournament
