= Westmont Warriors =

Athletic teams representing Westmont College

- University: Westmont College
- Conference: PacWest (primary)
- NCAA: Division II (reclassifying)
- Athletic director: Robert Ruiz
- Location: Santa Barbara, California
- Varsity teams: 15 (7 men's, 8 women's)
- Basketball arena: Murchison Gymnasium
- Baseball stadium: Russell Carr Field
- Soccer stadium: Thorrington Field
- Aquatics center: Westmont Pool
- Golf course: Stan Anderson Golf Complex
- Tennis venue: Lynn Abbott Tennis Courts
- Outdoor track and field venue: Westmont Track
- Nickname: Warriors
- Colors: Crimson, black, and gold
- Website: athletics.westmont.edu
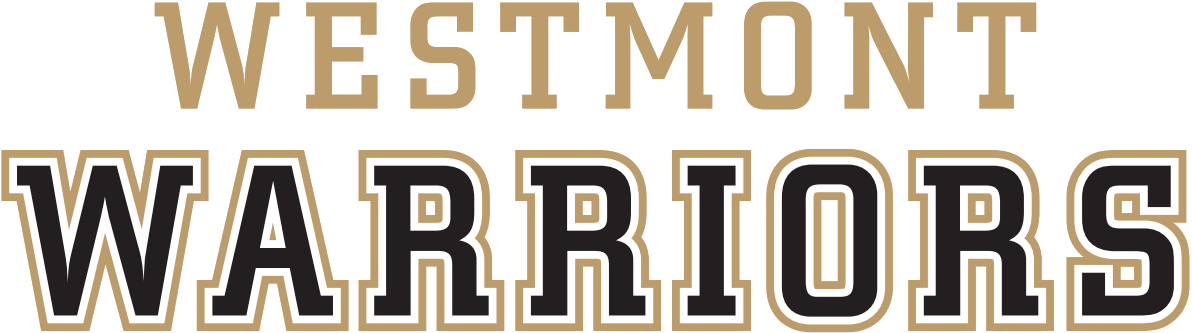

The Westmont Warriors are the athletic teams that represent Westmont College, located in Santa Barbara, California, in NCAA intercollegiate sports. Having moved its athletic programs from the National Association of Intercollegiate Athletics at the start of the 2023–24 season, the Warriors are currently in the second year of their transition into full NCAA Division II membership.

The Warriors are primarily members of the Pacific West Conference (PacWest), where 12 of its 15 athletics programs compete. The men's and women's indoor track and field programs are independents while the women's swimming and diving program is a member of the Pacific Collegiate Swim and Dive Conference.

On July 14, 2022, Westmont College has been notified by the National Collegiate Athletic Association (NCAA) that it was accepted into the multi-year membership process for Division II, while subsequently joining the (PacWest). Before making this move, the Warriors had been long-time members of the Golden State Athletic Conference (GSAC) of the National Association of Intercollegiate Athletics (NAIA), where they had competed from 1986 to 2023.

== Varsity sports ==
=== Teams ===
Men's sports (7)

- Baseball
- Basketball
- Cross Country
- Golf
- Soccer
- Tennis
- Track and field (indoor and outdoor)

Women's sports (8)

- Basketball
- Cross Country
- Golf
- Soccer
- Swimming and diving
- Tennis
- Track and field (indoor and outdoor)
- Volleyball

== National championships ==
=== Team ===
| Sport | Association | Division | Year | Runner-up | Score |
|---|---|---|---|---|---|
| Baseball (1) | NAIA | Single | 2023 | Lewis–Clark State | 7–6 |
| Men's soccer (1) | NAIA | Single | 1972 | Davis & Elkins | — |
| Women's soccer (5) | NAIA | Single | 1985 | Puget Sound | 4–2 |
| Women's soccer (5) | NAIA | Single | 1999 | Transylvania | 3–0 |
| Women's soccer (5) | NAIA | Single | 2001 | Oklahoma City | 1–0 |
| Women's soccer (5) | NAIA | Single | 2002 | Azusa Pacific | 2–1 |
| Women's soccer (5) | NAIA | Single | 2003 | Lindsey Wilson | 2–1 (7OT) |
| Women's tennis (1) | NAIA | Single | 1982 | Guilford | 28–25 |

== Individual programs ==
=== Basketball ===
The women's basketball team won the NAIA basketball championship in 2013 and 2021.

=== Soccer ===
The men's soccer team won the NAIA national championship in 1972. The women's soccer team has won the NAIA national championships in 1985, 1999, 2001, 2002, and 2003.

=== Tennis ===
The women's tennis team won the NAIA national championship in 1982.

== Club sports ==
Westmont has several club sports. The Equestrian Polo Team were the NCAA Polo National Champions in 2013 and 2014 and was a runner-up in 2007 to Texas A&M (12–8) and again in 2012 to the University of Virginia (23–17). They also compete in rugby football, ultimate frisbee, men's volleyball and cheerleading.
