= Davis & Elkins Senators =

- University: Davis & Elkins College
- Conference: MEC (primary); G-MAC (men's lacrosse)
- NCAA: Division II
- Athletic director: Jennifer Riggleman
- Location: Elkins, West Virginia
- Varsity teams: 20 (10 men's, 10 women's)
- Basketball arena: McDonnell Center
- Baseball stadium: Harpertown Field
- Soccer stadium: Nuttall Field
- Other venues: George A. Myles Pool
- Mascot: The Senator
- Nickname: Senators
- Colors: Scarlet and white
- Website: senatornation.com
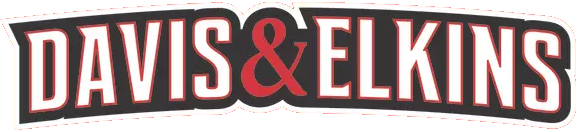

The Davis & Elkins Senators are the athletic teams that represent Davis & Elkins College, located in Elkins, West Virginia, in NCAA Division II intercollegiate sports. The Senators compete as members of the Mountain East Conference (MEC) for all sports except men's lacrosse, which is an affiliate of the Great Midwest Athletic Conference (G-MAC). In 2019, the Senators joined the MEC, thereby reuniting with most of their historic rivals.

The Senators were previously members of the West Virginia Intercollegiate Athletic Conference (WVIAC), joining as a founder in 1924 and remaining as a member until it was disbanded in 2012. Davis & Elkins was then forced to join the G-MAC after the football-playing members of the WVIAC formed the MEC. The Senators remained in the G-MAC until 2019, when the Mountain East added Davis & Elkins to replace Shepherd University.

== Varsity teams ==
Men's sports	Women's sports
Baseball	Basketball
Basketball	Cross country
Cross country	Golf
Golf	Lacrosse
Lacrosse	Soccer
Soccer	Softball
Swimming	Swimming
Tennis	Tennis
Track and field	Track and field
Wrestling	Volleyball

== National championships ==
Sport	Titles	Assoc.	Year	Rival	Score	Ref.
Soccer (men's)	2	NAIA	1968	Quincy (IL)	2–1 (a.e.t.)	
Soccer (men's)	2	NAIA	1970	Quincy (IL)	2–0	
