= 2016 Missouri Valley Conference men's soccer season =

Missouri Valley Conference
- Season: 2016
- Champions: Loyola
- MVC Tourney Winner: SIUE
- NCAA tournament: SIUE, Loyola
- Matches: 110
- Goals: 176 (1.6 per match)
- Top goalscorer: Niklas Brodacki (UCA) 13
- Biggest home win: UCA 4–0 Central Baptist (September 2); Loyola 4–0 Drake (October 8)
- Biggest away win: UCA 5–0 Green Bay (August 28)
- Highest scoring: Bradley 3–4 Fort Wayne (September 9 @ Evansville); Evansville 4–3 @ Drake (October 22)
- Longest winning run: 7 games Loyola (August 27–September 27)
- Longest unbeaten run: 14 games SIUE (September 28–November 27)
- Longest winless run: 12 games Bradley (September 24–November 8)
- Longest losing run: 8 games Bradley (October 11–November 8)
- Highest attendance: 2,651; Drake @ SIUE (October 1)
- Lowest attendance: 54; Missouri State vs CSU Bakersfield @ New Mexico
- Average attendance: 595.9
- All statistics correct as of November 29, 2016.

2016 Missouri Valley Conference men's soccer standings
	Conf.					Overall
Team	W		L		T	W		L		T
No. 21 Loyola Chicago +	6	–	1	–	1	14	–	4	–	1
No. 22 SIUE ‡	4	–	1	–	3	10	–	5	–	7
Evansville	4	–	2	–	2	9	–	8	–	3
Central Arkansas	4	–	3	–	1	7	–	7	–	3
Missouri State	3	–	4	–	1	9	–	8	–	2
Drake	2	–	5	–	1	6	–	12	–	1
Bradley	0	–	7	–	1	2	–	15	–	3
‡-MVC Tournament Champion +-Invited to the NCAA Division I Men's Soccer Championship; As of 13 December 2016; Rankings from NSCAA

The 2016 Missouri Valley Conference men's soccer season was the 26th season of men's varsity soccer in the conference.

The SIU Edwardsville Cougars were the defending regular season champions, while the Drake Bulldogs were the defending tournament champions.

The SIU Edwardsville Cougars defeated the host Missouri State Bears in the Missouri Valley Conference Men's Soccer Tournament final 1–0 and advanced to the NCAA tournament. The regular season champion Loyola Ramblers received an at-large bid to the tournament, giving the MVC two entries for the first time since 2011.

Loyola defeated UIC 2–0 in the first round before falling in the second round at 15th ranked and 13th seeded Notre Dame 1–0.

SIUE tied at 13th ranked Michigan State before advancing to the second round in an epic penalty kick battle 9–8. The Cougars then tied at 11th ranked and 15th seeded Butler 0–0 and advanced to the third round on penalty kicks 5–4. SIUE finally fell at 2nd ranked and 2nd seeded Wake Forest 2–1.

== Changes from 2015 ==
The MVC expanded the conference schedule from six games to eight. Each of the seven schools played a home-and-home series with two conference opponents and single games against the other four. The teams playing home-and-home series will change each year.

== Teams ==
Team	Location	Stadium	Capacity	Head coach	Uniform supplier
Bradley Braves	Peoria, Illinois	Shea Stadium	3,800	(United States) Jim DeRose	(Germany) adidas
Central Arkansas Bears	Conway, Arkansas	Bill Stephens Track/Soccer Complex	300	(United States) Ross Duncan	(Germany) adidas
Drake Bulldogs	Des Moines, Iowa	Cownie Sports Complex	2,000	(Scotland) Gareth Smith	(Germany) adidas
Evansville Purple Aces	Evansville, Indiana	Arad McCutchan Stadium	2,500	(United States) Marshall Ray	(Germany) adidas
Loyola Ramblers	Chicago, Illinois	Loyola Soccer Park	500	(New Zealand) Neil Jones	(United States) Nike
Missouri State Bears	Springfield, Missouri	Robert W. Plaster Stadium	16,600	(United States) John Leamy	(Germany) adidas
SIU Edwardsville Cougars	Edwardsville, Illinois	Ralph Korte Stadium	4,000	(United States) Mario Sanchez	(Germany) adidas

== Season outlook ==
2016 Preseason MVC Coaches' Poll

Rank	Team (1st-place votes)	Points
1	SIUE (4)	45
2	Drake (1)	39
3	Loyola	34
4	Missouri State (2)	32
4	Bradley	25
6	Central Arkansas	12
7	Evansville	9

2016 Preseason MVC All-Conference Team

Player	School	Position	Class	Hometown (High school)
Wes Carson	Central Arkansas	Forward	Senior	Fort Smith, Arkansas (Fort Smith Southside H.S.)
Elliot Collier †	Loyola	Forward	Junior	Hamilton, New Zealand (Saint Paul's Collegiate)
Jack Griffen	Missouri State	Midfielder	Senior	Beverley, England (Beverley Grammar School)
Ivan Gutierrez	SIUE	Midfielder	Senior	Hallandale Beach, Florida (Hallandale H.S)
Devyn Jambga	SIUE	Forward	Junior	Harare, Zimbabwe (Harare International School)
Logan Ketterer	Bradley	Goalkeeper	Senior	Racine, Wisconsin (The Prairie School)
Austin Ledbetter †	SIUE	Defender	Senior	St. Charles, Missouri (CBC H.S)
Fabian Lifka	Loyola	Midfielder	Sophomore	Kelkheim, Germany (Taunusgymnasium Koenigstein)
Mueng Sunday †	Drake	Midfielder	Senior	Coralville, Iowa (Iowa City West H.S.)
Kyle Thomson †	Loyola	Midfielder	Junior	Park Ridge, Illinois (Maine South H.S.)
James Wypych †	Drake	Midfielder	Senior	Wellington, New Zealand (St. Patrick's College)

† = Also on 2015 Preseason MVC All-Conference Team

== Regular season ==
=== Rankings ===
==== NSCAA National Poll ====
Source =

Legend
Increase in ranking
Decrease in ranking
Not ranked previous week or no change in ranking

	Pre	Wk 1	Wk 2	Wk 3	Wk 4	Wk 5	Wk 6	Wk 7	Wk 8	Wk 9	Wk 10	Wk 11	Wk 12	Final
Bradley	—	—	—	—	—	—	—	—	—	—	—	—	—	—
Central Arkansas	—	—	—	—	—	—	—	—	—	—	—	—	—	—
Drake	—	—	—	—	—	—	—	—	—	—	—	—	—	—
Evansville	—	—	—	—	—	—	—	—	—	—	—	—	—	—
Loyola	—	—	rv	18	17	12	14	13	15	11	14	13	17	21
Missouri State	—	—	—	—	—	—	—	—	—	—	—	—	—	—
SIUE	—	—	—	—	—	—	—	—	—	—	—	—	—	22

==== West Region rankings ====
Source =

	Wk 1	Wk 2	Wk 3	Wk 4	Wk 5	Wk 6	Wk 7	Wk 8	Wk 9	Wk 10	Wk 11	Wk 12	Final
Bradley	—	—	—	—	—	—	—	—	—	—	—	—	—
Central Arkansas	—	—	—	—	—	—	—	—	—	—	—	—	—
Drake	—	—	—	—	—	—	—	—	—	—	—	—	—
Evansville	—	10	10	7	7	9	10	10	9	8	8	8	—
Loyola	5	3	2	2	2	2	2	2	2	2	2	2	—
Missouri State	—	—	—	9	9	7	7	8	8	9	9	9	—
SIUE	9	8	6	—	—	—	9	7	7	7	7	5	—

==== NCAA RPI ====
Source =

	Wk 5	Wk 6	Wk 7	Wk 8	Wk 9	Wk 10	Wk 11	Wk 12	Final
Bradley	144	145	156	167	172	186	187	199	193
Central Arkansas	204	203	203	188	168	165	159	159	161
Drake	127	133	139	117	120	137	154	156	157
Evansville	77	95	86	106	92	80	92	88	88
Loyola	4	8	5	4	4	8	11	16	21
Missouri State	158	144	128	138	132	127	142	130	134
SIUE	116	99	108	111	93	84	81	73	48

=== MVC Players of the Week ===
Date	Offensive Player of the Week	Class	Position	School	Defensive Player of the Week	Class	Position	School
August 29	Wes Carson	Senior	Forward	Central Arkansas	Nick Burtenshaw	Junior	Defender	Missouri State
September 6	Niklas Brodacki	Freshman	Forward	Central Arkansas	Grant Stoneman	Sophomore	Defender	Loyola
September 12	Steven Enna	Junior	Forward	Drake	Grant Stoneman	Sophomore	Defender	Loyola
September 19	Jared Robinson	Senior	Forward	Evansville	Grant Stoneman	Sophomore	Defender	Loyola
September 26	Emmerich Hoegg	Senior	Forward	Missouri State	Andrew Chekadanov	Junior	Goalkeeper	Loyola
October 3	Devyn Jambga	Junior	Forward	SIUE	Logan Ketterer	Senior	Goalkeeper	Bradley
October 10	Alec Lasinski	Sophomore	Forward	Loyola	Kyle Dal Santo	Junior	Goalkeeper	SIUE
October 17	Niklas Brodacki	Freshman	Forward	Central Arkansas	Marc Olsen	Freshman	Goalkeeper	Central Arkansas
October 24	Niklas Brodacki	Freshman	Forward	Central Arkansas	Marius Kullmann	Freshman	Defender	Loyola
October 31	Zac Blaydes	Sophomore	Midfielder	Evansville	Austin Ledbetter	Senior	Defender	SIUE
November 7	Niklas Brodacki	Freshman	Forward	Central Arkansas	Marc Olsen	Freshman	Goalkeeper	Central Arkansas

== Postseason ==
=== MVC Tournament ===
The second-seeded SIUE Cougars won the tournament, beating the tournament host and fifth-seeded Missouri State Bears 1–0 in the championship match. It was SIUE's second Missouri Valley Conference Men's Soccer Tournament championship.

=== NCAA tournament ===
Seed	Region	School	1st round	2nd round	3rd round	Quarterfinals	Semifinals	Championship
—	4	SIUE	@ #13 Michigan State; Tied 1–1; won PK shoot-out 9–8	@ #11 Butler; Tied 0–0; won PK shoot-out 5–4	@ #2 Wake Forest; Lost 2–1	—	—	—
—	2	#17 Loyola	vs UIC; Won 2–0	@ #15 Notre Dame; Lost 1–0	—	—	—	—

=== 2017 MLS SuperDraft ===
Round	Pick #	MLS team	Player	Position	College	Other
3	53	FC Dallas	(United States) Austin Ledbetter	Defender	SIUE	
4	71	Columbus Crew SC	(United States) Logan Ketterer	Goalkeeper	Bradley	

== Honors ==
=== 2016 NSCAA NCAA Division I Men's All-West Region teams ===
Player	School	Position	Class	Hometown (High school/Previous college)
First Team
(United States) Andrew Chekadanov	Loyola University Chicago	Goalkeeper	Junior	St. Louis, Missouri (Parkway Central)
(United States) Austin Ledbetter	Southern Illinois University Edwardsville	Defender	Senior	St. Charles, Missouri (CBC)
(United States) Grant Stoneman	Loyola University Chicago	Defender	R-Sophomore	Saint Charles, Illinois (Wheaton Academy/Wisconsin)
(United States) Ian McGrath	University of Evansville	Midfielder	Junior	New Lenox, Illinois (Lincoln-Way West HS)
(New Zealand) Elliot Collier	Loyola University Chicago	Forward	Junior	Hamilton, New Zealand (Saint Paul's Collegiate)
Second Team
(United States) Ryan Howe	Loyola University Chicago	Defender (Midfielder)	R-Senior	Rockford, Illinois (Boylan Catholic)
(United States) Brody Kraussel	Loyola University Chicago	Midfielder (Forward)	Junior	Milwaukee, Wisconsin (Muskego)
(Sweden) Niklas Brodacki	University of Central Arkansas	Forward	Freshman	Norrkoping, Sweden (IFK Norrkoping)
(United States) Emmerich "Rick" Hoegg	Missouri State University	Forward	R-Senior	Crestview, Florida (Choctawhatchee High)
(Zimbabwe) Devyn Jambga	Southern Illinois University Edwardsville	Forward	R-Junior	Harare, Zimbabwe
Third Team
(United States) Kyle Dal Santo	Southern Illinois University Edwardsville	Goalkeeper	R-Junior	Bolingbrook, Illinois (Benet Academy)
(United States) Rob Oslica	Missouri State University	Defender	Junior	Ozark, Missouri (Ozark)
(Denmark) Simon Waever	University of Evansville	Defender	Freshman	Holte, Denmark (Skovlyskolen)
(England) Jack Griffin	Missouri State University	Midtielder	Senior	Beverley, England (Beverley Grammar School)
(United States) Mueng Sunday	Drake University	Midfielder	Senior	Coralville, Iowa (Iowa City West)
(United States) Jared Robinson	University of Evansville	Forward	Senior	Powell, Ohio (Olentangy Liberty HS)
(New Zealand) James Wypych	Drake University	Forward	Senior	Wellington, New Zealand (St. Patrick's College)

=== 2016 CoSIDA Academic All-America teams ===
==== Second Team ====
James Wypych. Senior Forward, Drake, 3.57 GPA, International relations

==== Third Team ====
Clark Emerson. Junior.Defender Bradley; 4.00 GPA, Finance

=== 2016 CoSIDA Academic All-District teams ===
Only All-District players are eligible for the Academic All-America ballot.

==== District 5 (IL, IN, MI, OH) ====
Clark Emerson. Junior. Bradley; 4.00 GPA, Finance

Kirill Likhovid, Senior, Loyola,3.53 GPA; Communication networks & security

Jacob Taylor. Junior, Bradley, 3.78 GPA, Mechanical engineering

==== District 6 (AR, IA, LA, MN, MO, MS, ND, SD, WI) ====
Steven Enna, Junior, Drake, 3.55 GPA, Business studies

James Grunert, Senior, Drake, 3.79 GPA, Health sciences

Chris Holmes, Sophomore, Central Arkansas, 4.00 GPA, Undecided

Ben LeMay, Senior, Drake, 3.78 GPA, Pharmacy MBA

Rob Oslica, Junior. Missouri State, 3.70 GPA, Cell & molecular biology

Liam Priestley, Junior, Missouri State, 3.48 GPA, Finance

Phil Woods, Senior Missouri State, 3.82 GPA, Entertainment management

James Wypych. Senior, Drake, 3.57 GPA, International relations

=== 2016 NSCAA NCAA Division I Men's Scholar All-America teams ===
Second Team

Position	Name	Class	School	Major	GPA	Hometown
Goalkeeper	Andrew Chekadonov	Senior	Loyola University Chicago	Accounting	3.61	St. Louis, Missouri
Midfielder	Ian McGrath	Junior	University of Evansville	Exercise Science	3.35	New Lenox, Illinois

=== NSCAA 2015-16 College Team Academic Award ===
The National Soccer Coaches Association of America (NSCAA) annually recognizes college and high school soccer programs that have excelled in the classroom by posting a team grade point average of 3.0 or higher. Six of the MVC's seven teams were honored this year. The schools, their head coaches, and their team GPAs are:

Bradley University, Jim DeRose, 3.18

Drake University, Gareth Smith, 3.33

University of Evansville, Marshall Ray, 3.19

Loyola University of Chicago, Neil Jones, 3.20

Missouri State University, Jon Leamy, 3.02

Southern Illinois University Edwardsville, Mario Sanchez, 3.26

=== 2016 MVC awards ===
Source=

2016 MVC Men's Soccer Individual Awards
Award	Recipient(s)
Player of the Year	Austin Ledbetter, SIUE
Offensive Player of the Year	Niklas Brodacki, Central Arkansas
Defensive Player of the Year	Austin Ledbetter, SIUE
Goalkeeper of the Year	Andrew Chekadanov, Loyola
Freshman of the Year	Niklas Brodacki, Central Arkansas
Coaching Staff of the Year	Loyola (Neil Jones, Nate Boyden, Michael Mauro, Jeff DeGroot)
MVC Fair Play Award	Loyola and Missouri State

=== 2016 MVC All-Conference First Team ===
Player	School	Position	Class	Hometown (High school/Previous college)
Andrew Chekadanov	Loyola	Goalkeeper	R-Junior	St. Louis, Missouri (Parkway Central)
Devyn Jambga	SIUE	Forward	R-Junior	Harare, Zimbabwe (Harare International School)
Niklas Brodacki	Central Arkansas	Forward	Freshman	Norrkoping, Sweden (IFK Norrkoping)
James Wypych	Drake	Midfielder	Senior	Wellington, New Zealand (St. Patrick's College)
Jared Robinson	Evansville	Forward	Senior	Powell, Ohio (Olentangy Liberty HS)
Emmerich Hoegg	Missouri State	Forward	R-Senior	Crestview, Florida (Choctawhatchee High)
Ian McGrath	Evansville	Midfielder	Junior	New Lenox, Illinois (Lincoln-Way West HS)
Mueng Sunday	Drake	Midfielder	Senior	Coralville, Iowa (Iowa City West)
Elliot Collier	Loyola	Forward	Junior	Hamilton, New Zealand (Saint Paul's Collegiate)
Brody Kraussel	Loyola	Midfielder/Forward	Junior	Milwaukee, Wisconsin (Muskego)
Austin Ledbetter	SIUE	Defender	Senior	St. Charles, Missouri (CBC)
Grant Stoneman	Loyola	Midfielder/Defender	R-Sophomore	Saint Charles, Illinois (Wheaton Academy/Wisconsin)
Ryan Howe	Loyola	Midfielder	R-Senior	Rockford, Illinois (Boylan Catholic)

=== 2016 MVC All-Conference Second Team ===
Player	School	Position	Class	Hometown (High school/Previous college)
Kyle Dal Santo	SIUE	Goalkeeper	Junior	Bolingbrook, Illinois (Benet Academy)
Alec Lasinski	Loyola	Forward	Sophomore	Ann Arbor, Michigan (Skyline)
Wes Carson	Central Arkansas	Forward	Senior	Fort Smith, Arkansas (Fort Smith Southside)
Kyle Thomson	Loyola	Midfielder	Junior	Park Ridge, Illinois (Maine South)
Jack Griffin	Missouri State	Midfielder	Senior	Beverley, England (Beverley Grammar School)
Zac Blaydes	Evansville	Forward	Sophomore	Midway, Kentucky (Woodford County)
Mohamed Awad	SIUE	Midfielder	Junior	Hamilton, New Zealand (Hamilton Boys'/St. John's)
Kirill Likhovid	Loyola	Midfielder/Defender	Senior	Arlington Heights, Illinois (Buffalo Grove)
Andrew Kendall-Moullin	SIUE	Defender	Senior	Faribault, Minnesota (Shattuck St. Mary's)
Robbie Oslica	Missouri State	Defender	Junior	Ozark, Missouri (Ozark)

=== 2016 MVC All-Freshman Team ===
Player	School	Position	Hometown (High school)
Niklas Brodacki	Central Arkansas	Forward	Norrkoping, Sweden (IFK Norrkoping)
Jonathan Gilkes	Central Arkansas	Midfielder	Boras, Sweden (Byttorps IF)
Marc Olsen	Central Arkansas	Goalkeeper	Copenhagen, Denmark (Brondby Gynamsium)
Antonio Sanchez	Drake	Midfielder	Coralville, Iowa (Iowa City West)
Simon Waever	Evansville	Defender	Holte, Denmark (Skovlyskolen)
Marius Kullmann	Loyola	Defender	Fulda, Germany (Marianum Fulda)
Lachlan McLean	SIUE	Forward	Sydney, Australia (St. Augustines College Sydney)

==== 2016 MVC All-Tournament Team ====
Source=

2015 Missouri Valley Conference Men's Soccer Tournament MVP— Austin Ledbetter, SIUE

Player	School	Position
Richard Olson	Bradley	Forward
Wes Carson	Central Arkansas	Forward
Mueng Sunday	Drake	Midfielder
Ian McGrath	Evansville	Midfielder
Zac Blaydes	Evansville	Forward
Ryan Howe	Loyola	Midfielder
Kevin Engesser	Loyola	Midfielder/Defender
Rob Oslica	Missouri State	Defender
Jake Buckle	Missouri State	Midfielder/Forward
Emmerich Hoegg	Missouri State	Forward
Kyle Dal Santo	SIUE	Goalkeeper
Devyn Jambga	SIUE	Forward
Keegan McHugh	SIUE	Midfielder
Austin Ledbetter	SIUE	Defender

==== 2016 MVC Men's Soccer Scholar-Athlete teams ====
Source=

The criteria for the All-MVC honor parallels the CoSIDA (College Sports Information Directors of America) standards for Academic All-America voting. Nominees must be starters or important reserves with at least a 3.20 cumulative grade-point average (on a 4.00 scale). Also, students must have participated in at least 75 percent of the regular-season matches or played in the league tournament. Student-athletes must have reached sophomore athletic and academic standing at their institution (true freshmen and redshirt freshmen are not eligible) and must have completed at least one full academic year at their institution.

Player	School	Class	GPA	Major	Hometown (High school/Previous college)
First Team
Zac Blaydes	Evansville	Sophomore	3.75	Exercise Science	Midway, Ky. (Woodford Co.)
Andrew Chekadanov	Loyola	Junior	3.61	Accounting	St. Louis, Mo. (Parkway Central)
Clark Emerson #	Bradley	Junior	4.00	Mechanical Engineering	Grand Prairie, Texas (Mansfield Lake Ridge)
James Grunert #%	Drake	Senior	3.79	Health Sciences	Muskego, Wis. (Muskego)
Ben LeMay #	Drake	Senior	3.78	Pharmacy	Hugo, Minn. (St. Thomas Academy)
Ian McGrath	Evansville	Junior	3.75	Athletic Training	New Lenox, Ill. (Lincoln-Way West)
Rob Oslica #	Missouri State	Junior	3.70	Cell & Molecular Biology	Ozark, Mo. (Ozark)
Mueng Sunday #	Drake	Senior	3.65	Finance	Coralville, Iowa (Iowa City West)
Jacob Taylor	Bradley	Junior	3.78	Mechanical Engineering	Dunlap, Ill. (Dunlap)
Phil Woods *	Missouri State	Senior	3.82	Entertainment Management	Sheffield, England (Tapton Secondary School)
James Wypych #	Drake	Senior	3.57	International Relations	Wellington, New Zealand (St. Patrick's College)
Honorable Mention
Steven Enna	Drake	Junior	3.55	Business	Overland Park, Kan. (St. James Academy)
Chris Holmes	Central Arkansas	Sophomore	4.00	Undecided	Conway, Ark. (Little Rock Catholic)
Ryan Howe	Loyola	Senior	3.56	Accounting	Rockford, Ill. (Boylan Catholic)
Logan Ketterer %	Bradley	Senior	3.35	Accounting	Racine, Wis. (The Prairie School)
Kirill Likhovid	Loyola	Senior	3.53	Communication Networks & Security	Arlington Heights, Ill. (Buffalo Grove)
Darrin MacLeod	Drake	Senior	3.50	Health Sciences	Waterloo, Ontario (Resurrection Catholic)
Liam Priestley	Missouri State	Junior	3.48	Finance	Essex, England (St. Thomas More)

- # = First Team in 2015; * = Honorable Mention in 2015; % = Honorable Mention in 2014
