= 2016 Missouri Valley Conference men's soccer tournament =

2016 Missouri Valley Conference Men's Soccer Tournament
Tournament details
- Country: United States
- Teams: 7

Final positions
- Champions: SIUE
- Runners-up: Missouri State

Tournament statistics
- Matches played: 6
- Goals scored: 14 (2.33 per match)
- Top goal scorer(s): Jake Buckle (MoSt)–2; Ian McGrath (UE)–2

Awards
- Best player: Austin Ledbetter {SIUE}

The 2016 Missouri Valley Conference men's soccer tournament was the 26th edition of the tournament. It determined the Missouri Valley Conference's (MVC) automatic berth in the 2016 NCAA Division I Men's Soccer Championship. Missouri State University hosted the tournament at Betty & Bobby Allison South Stadium on the Missouri State campus in Springfield, Missouri on November 8, 9, 11 &13, 2016.

The second-seeded SIUE Cougars won the tournament, beating the fifth-seeded Missouri State Bears 1–0 in the championship match. It was SIUE's second MVC championship.

== Qualification ==
2016 Missouri Valley Conference men's soccer standings
	Conf.					Overall
Team	W		L		T	W		L		T
No. 21 Loyola Chicago +	6	–	1	–	1	14	–	4	–	1
No. 22 SIUE ‡	4	–	1	–	3	10	–	5	–	7
Evansville	4	–	2	–	2	9	–	8	–	3
Central Arkansas	4	–	3	–	1	7	–	7	–	3
Missouri State	3	–	4	–	1	9	–	8	–	2
Drake	2	–	5	–	1	6	–	12	–	1
Bradley	0	–	7	–	1	2	–	15	–	3
‡-MVC Tournament Champion +-Invited to the NCAA Division I Men's Soccer Championship; As of 13 December 2016; Rankings from NSCAA

In a departure from the past, all seven teams in the Missouri Valley Conference qualified for the tournament with seeding based on their conference regular season records. The two top-seeded teams received first round byes, and the two bottom-seeded teams met in a play-in game.

== Bracket ==
Play-In
6	Drake	2
7	Bradley	0

Quarterfinals
4	Central Arkansas	1
5	Missouri State 5–4	1 (PK)
6	Drake	1
3	Evansville	2 (ot)

Semifinals
1	Loyola Chicago	1
5	Missouri State	2 (ot)
2	SIUE	2
3	Evansville	1

Final
5	Missouri State	0
2	SIUE	1

== Television/internet coverage ==
All games will be streamed live on The Valley on ESPN3.

== Schedule ==
November 8, 2016 Play-in Game	Bradley Braves	0–2	Drake Bulldogs	Springfield, Missouri
12 noon (CST)	Ciaramitaro (yellow card) 49'; Ketterer (red card) 90'	Report	Pendrigh 27'; Sunday 90' (pen.)	Stadium: Betty & Bobby Allison South Stadium; Attendance: 206; Referee: Andy Ellsworth; Assistant referees: Shane Kennard & Daniel Edwards; Fourth official: Patrick Burns

November 9, 2016 Quarterfinals	Evansville Purple Aces	2–1 ^{(ot)}	Drake Bulldogs	Springfield, Missouri
3:00 PM (CST)	McGrath 13' (Waever & Simon); McDougal (yellow card) 75'; Blaydes 91'	Report	Sanchez 6'; Ciszewsk (yellow card) 61'; Heine (yellow card) 91'	Stadium: Betty & Bobby Allison South Stadium; Attendance: 126; Referee: Doug Wolff; Assistant referees: George Major & Elvis Mahmutovic; Fourth official: Andy Ellsworth

November 9, 2016 Quarterfinals	Missouri State Bears	1–1 (5–4 p)	Central Arkansas Bears	Springfield, Missouri
6:00 PM (CST)	Buckle 27' (Hoegg & Laird); Griffin (yellow card) 92'	Report	Carson, 8' (Woody)	Stadium: Betty & Bobby Allison South Stadium; Attendance: 406; Referee: Jon Freemon; Assistant referees: Klayton Babin & David Henderson; Fourth official: Scottie Stiles
	Penalties
	Griffin (penalty scored); Routledge (penalty scored); Buckle (penalty scored); Hoegg (penalty missed); Swanner (penalty scored); Lightbourne (penalty scored)		Moquete (penalty scored); San Roman (penalty missed); Knutson (penalty scored); Ilia (penalty scored); Brodacki (penalty scored); Kampmann (penalty missed)

November 11, 2016 Semifinals	Evansville Purple Aces	1–2	SIUE Cougars	Springfield, Missouri
3:00 PM (CST)	McGrath 81' (Blaydes); McGrath (yellow card) 83'; Baum (yellow card) 8u'	Report	Ledbetter 25'; Duncan 59' (Jambga & Awad)	Stadium: Betty & Bobby Allison South Stadium; Attendance: 268; Referee: Shane Butler; Assistant referees: Leszek Skowyra & Don Tebeau; Fourth official: Tim Wagner

November 11, 2016 Semifinals	Missouri State Bears	2–1 ^{(ot)}	Loyola Ramblers	Springfield, Missouri
6:00 PM (CST)	Langton (yellow card) 68'; Buckle 73' (Lightbourne) \ Hoegg 96' (Routledge)	Report	Stoneman (yellow card) 12'; Engesser 23'	Stadium: Betty & Bobby Allison South Stadium; Attendance: 483; Referee: David Jaworski; Assistant referees: Shane Kennard & Austin Stiles; Fourth official: Dan Edwards

November 13, 2016 MVC FINAL	SIUE Cougars	1–0	Missouri State Bears	Springfield, Missouri
1:00 PM (CST)	Jambga 36'; Ebbesen (yellow card) 43'	Report	Jones (red card) 78'	Stadium: Betty & Bobby Allison South Stadium; Attendance: 679; Referee: Ben Trevino; Assistant referees: Mike Dutt & Matt Stein; Fourth official: Shane Kennard

== Statistics ==
Scoring
Rank	Player	School	Games	Goals	Assists	Points
1	Buckle	MoSt	3	2	0	4
	McGrath	UE	2	2	0	4
3	Blaydes	UE	2	1	1	3
	Hoegg	MoSt	3	1	1	3
	Jambga	SIUE	2	1	1	3
6	Carson	UCA	1	1	0	2
	Duncan	SIUE	2	1	0	2
	Engesser	LU	1	1	0	2
	Ledbetter	SIUE	2	1	0	2
	Pendrigh	DU	2	1	0	2
	Sunday	DU	2	1	0	2
	Sanchez	DU	1	1	0	2
13	Awad	SIUE	2	0	1	1
	Simon	UE	1	0	1	1
	Weaver	UE	1	0	1	1
	Woody	UCA	1	0	1	1
	Laird	MoSt	3	0	1	1
	Lightbourne	MoSt	3	0	1	1
	Routledge	MoSt	3	0	1	1

Goalkeeping
Rank	Player	School	Games	Minutes	Goals	Saves	Save %	Goals against ave.
1	Dal Santo	SIUE	2	180:00	1	6	.857	0.500
2	Olsen	UCA	1	110:00	1	3	.750	0.818
3	MacLeod	DU	2	180:19	2	4	.667	0.998
4	Priestley	MoSt	3	295:45	3	3	.500	0.913
5	Ketterer	BU	1	89:25	1	1	.500	1.007
6	Reimer	UE	2	180:19	3	4	.571	1.497
7	Chekadanov	LU	1	95:45	2	2	.500	1.880
8	Wisbey	BU	1	0:35	1	0	0.000	154.321

== 2016 MVC Men's Soccer All-Tournament team ==
2016 Missouri Valley Conference Men's Soccer Tournament MVP— Austin Ledbetter, SIUE

- Richard Olson, Bradley
- Wes Carson, Central Arkansas
- Mueng Sunday, Drake
- Ian McGrath, Evansville
- Zac Blaydes, Evansville
- Ryan Howe, Loyola
- Kevin Engesser, Loyola
- Rob Oslica, Missouri State
- Jake Buckle, Missouri State
- Emmerich Hoegg, Missouri State
- Kyle Dal Santo, SIUE
- Devyn Jambga, SIUE
- Keegan McHugh, SIUE

== See also ==
- Missouri Valley Conference
- 2016 Missouri Valley Conference men's soccer season
- 2016 NCAA Division I men's soccer season
- 2016 NCAA Division I Men's Soccer Championship
