= 2015 Missouri Valley Conference men's soccer season =

Missouri Valley Conference
- Season: 2015
- Champions: SIUE
- MVC Tourney Winner: Drake
- To NCAA tournament: Drake
- Matches: 106
- Goals: 153 (1.44 per match)
- Average goals/game: 1.205
- Top goalscorer: Wes Carson, UCA; 9 goals
- Biggest home win: Evansville 4–0 Northern Kentucky (November 3); Bradley 4–0 Missouri State (October 17); SIUE 4–0 UCA (October 3); Drake 4–0 UMKC (September 15)
- Biggest away win: Bradley 5–1 Evansville (October 10)
- Highest scoring: Incarnate Word 8–1 UCA (September 18); Oral Roberts 6–0 UCA (October 27)
- Longest winning run: 8 games SIUE (October 3–November 13)
- Longest unbeaten run: 9 games SIUE (October 3–November 15)
- Longest winless run: 12 games UCA (September 6–October 27)
- Longest losing run: 10 games Evansville (September 23–November 3)
- Highest attendance: H–2,375 SIUE vs. UCA; A–5,483 UCA @ St.Louis; N–584 Bradley vs. UNLV @ Utah Valley
- Lowest attendance: H–90 Drake vs. UMKC; A–103 Bradley @ Western Illinois; N–22 Missouri State vs. Loyola Marymount @ New Mexico
- Total attendance: 80,697
- Average attendance: 761.29
- All statistics correct as of November 23, 2015.

The 2015 Missouri Valley Conference men's soccer season was the 25th season of men's varsity soccer in the conference. The defending regular season champion was Missouri State, and the defending postseason champion was Southern Illinois University Edwardsville (SIUE).

The Missouri Valley Conference men's soccer tournament was hosted by SIUE on Bob Guelker Field at Ralph Korte Stadium in Edwardsville, Illinois on November 11, 13, and 15. The Drake Bulldogs defeated the host team in the final 1–0 and advanced to the NCAA tournament. They then upset 17th ranked Kentucky before falling in the second round to 9th ranked and 12th seeded Creighton.

== Teams ==
2015 Missouri Valley Conference men's soccer standings
	Conf.					Overall
Team	W		L		T	W		L		T
SIUE	5	–	1	–	0	12	–	5	–	2
Bradley	4	–	1	–	1	7	–	10	–	1
Drake ‡	3	–	1	–	2	13	–	5	–	3
Missouri State	3	–	2	–	1	6	–	6	–	5
Loyola Chicago	2	–	2	–	2	10	–	4	–	5
Central Arkansas	1	–	5	–	0	2	–	15	–	1
Evansville	0	–	6	–	0	3	–	13	–	0
‡-MVC Tournament Champion +-Invited to the NCAA Division I Men's Soccer Championship; As of November 22, 2015; Rankings from NSCAA

Team	Location	Stadium	Capacity	Head coach	Uniform supplier
Bradley Braves	Peoria, Illinois	Shea Stadium	3,800	(United States) Jim DeRose	(Germany) adidas
Central Arkansas Bears	Conway, Arkansas	Bill Stephens Track/Soccer Complex	300	(United States) Ross Duncan	(Germany) adidas
Drake Bulldogs	Des Moines, Iowa	Cownie Sports Complex	2,000	(Scotland) Gareth Smith	(Germany) adidas
Evansville Purple Aces	Evansville, Indiana	McCutchan Stadium	2,500	(United States) Marshall Ray	(Germany) adidas
Loyola Ramblers	Chicago, Illinois	Loyola Soccer Park	500	(New Zealand) Neil Jones	(United States) Nike
Missouri State Bears	Springfield, Missouri	Plaster Sports Complex	16,600	(United States) John Leamy	(Germany) adidas
SIU Edwardsville Cougars	Edwardsville, Illinois	Ralph Korte Stadium	4,000	(United States) Mario Sanchez	(Germany) adidas

== Season outlook ==
2015 Preseason MVC Coaches' Poll

Rank	Team (1st-place votes)	Points
1	SIUE (3)	42
2	Missouri State (3)	39
3	Loyola	38
4	Bradley (1)	27
5	Drake	26
6	Evansville	15
7	Central Arkansas	9

2015 Preseason MVC All-Conference Team

Player	School	Position	Class	Hometown (High school)
Alec Bartlett	Drake	Defender	Senior	Overland Park, Kansas (St. James Academy)
Grant Bell	Bradley	Defender	Senior	Springfield, Ill. (Rochester H.S.)
Justin Bilyeu	SIUE	Defernder	Senior	St. Louis, Missouri (CBC H.S)
Elliot Collier	Loyola	Forward	Sophomore	Hamilton, New Zealand (Saint Paul's Collegiate)
Tim Dobrowolski	Loyola	Goalkeeper	Senior	Rockford, Illinois (Boylan Catholic)
Mark Anthony Gonzalez	Evansville	Forward	Senior	Toronto, Ontario, Canada (Robert F. Hall Catholic)
Emmerich Hoegg	Missouri State	Midfielder/Forward	Senior	Crestview, Florida (Choctawhatchee High)
Austin Ledbetter	SIUE	Defender	Junior	St. Charles, Missouri (CBC H.S)
Eric Schoendorf	Loyola	Midfielder/Defender	Senior	Delafield, Wisconsin (Catholic Memorial)
Mueng Sunday	Drake	Midfielder	Junior	Coralville, Iowa (Iowa City West)
Kyle Thomson	Loyola	Midfielder	Sophomore	Park Ridge, Illinois (Maine South)
James Wypych	Drake	Midfielder	Junior	Wellington, New Zealand (St. Patrick's College)

== Postseason ==
=== MVC Tournament ===
Site Ralph Korte Stadium @ SIUE

Quarterfinals; Wednesday, November 11
4	Missouri State	0
5	Loyola	1
3	Drake	2
6	Central Arkansas	0

Semifinals; Friday, November 13
1	SIUE; PKs 4–3	0
5	Loyola	0
3	Drake	1
2	Bradley	0

Final; Sunday, November 15
1	SIUE	0
3	Drake	1

=== NCAA tournament ===
Seed	Region	School	1st round	2nd round	3rd round	Quarterfinals	Semifinals	Championship
—	2	Drake	@ Kentucky; Won 2–1	@ #12 Creighton; Lost 5–1	—	—	—	—

=== 2016 MLS SuperDraft ===
Round	Pick #	MLS team	Player	Position	College	Other
1	18	New York Red Bulls	(United States) Justin Bilyeu	Defender	SIUE	

== Honors ==
=== 2015 NSCAA NCAA Division I Men's All-West Region teams ===
==== First Team ====
- Tim Dobrowolski; Senior Goalkeeper; Loyola Chicago; Rockford, Illinois
- Austin Ledbetter; Junior Defender; SIU Edwardsville; St. Charles, Missouri
- Mueng Sunday; Junior Midfielder; Drake; Coralville, Iowa
- James Wypych; Junior Forward; Drake; Wellington, New Zealand

==== Second Team ====
- Eric Schoendorf; Senior Defender; Loyola Chicago; Delafield, Wisconsin
- Mark Anthony Gonzalez; Senior Midfielder; Evansville; Bolton, Ontario, Canada
- Kyle Thomson; Sophomore Midfielder; Loyola Chicago; Park Ridge, Illinois
- Jabari Danzi; Senior Forward; SIU Edwardsville; Park Forest, Illinois

==== Third Team ====
- Justin Bilyeu; Senior Defender; SIU Edwardsville; St. Louis, Missouri
- Daniel Hare; Senior Defender; Loyola Chicago; Overland Park, Kansas
- Jack Griffin; Junior Midfielder; Missouri State; Beverley, England, UK
- Grant Bell; Senior Forward; Bradley; Little Falls, Minnesota

=== 2015 CoSIDA Academic All-America teams ===
==== First Team ====
- Jacob Wieser, Senior, SIUE, 3.95 GPA, Nursing

=== 2015 CoSIDA Academic All-District teams ===
Only All-District players were eligible for the Academic All-America ballot.

==== District 5 (IL, IN, MI, OH) ====
- Clark Emerson, Sophomore, Bradley, 4.00 GPA, Mechanical Engineering
- Andrew Kovacevic, Junior, Bradley, 3.96 GPA, Finance
- Jacob Wieser, Senior, SIUE, 3.95 GPA, Nursing

==== District 6 (AR, IA, LA, MN, MO, MS, ND, SD, WI) ====
- Alec Bartlett, Srenior, Drake, 3.51 GPA, Biology
- James Grunert, Junior, Drake, 3.74 GPA, Health Sciences
- Ben LeMay, Junior, Drake, 3.82 GPA, Pharmacy/MBA
- Darrin MacLeod, Junior, Drake, 3.49 GPA, International Business
- Rob Oslica, Soophomore, Missouri State, 3.79 GPA, Cell & Molecular Biology
- Phil Woods, Junior, Missouri State, 3.85 GPA, Entertainment Management
- James Wypych, Junior, Drake, 3.69 GPA, International Relations

=== NSCAA 2014-15 College Team Academic Award ===
The NSCAA annually recognizes college and high school soccer programs that have excelled in the classroom by posting a team grade point average of 3.0 or higher. Four of the MVC's seven teams were honored.

- Drake University
- Loyola University of Chicago
- Missouri State University
- Southern Illinois University Edwardsville

=== 2015 MVC awards ===
Source=

2015 MVC Player of the Year — Eric Shoendorf, Loyola

2015 MVC Defensive Player of the Year — Eric Shoendorf, Loyola

2015 MVC Goalkeeper of the Year — Tim Dobrowolski, Loyola

2015 MVC Freshman of the Year — Frank Bak, Bradley

2015 MVC Coaching Staff of the Year — SIUE (Mario Sanchez, David Korn, Scott Gyllenborg, Tim Boruff, Billy Berger)

2015 MVC Fair Play Award— Missouri State

==== 2015 MVC All-Conference First Team ====
Player	School	Position	Class	Hometown (High school/Previous college)
Tim Dobrowolski	Loyola	Goalkeeper	Senior	Rockford, Illinois (Boylan Catholic)
Grant Bell	Bradley	Forward	Senior	Little Falls, Minnesota (Little Falls Community)
Wes Carson	Central Arkansas	Forward	Junior	Fort Smith, Arkansas (Fort Smith Southside)
Jabari Danzy	SIUE	Forward	Senior	Park Forest, Illinois (Marian Catholic/Northern Illinois)
Jack Griffin	Missouri State	Midfielder	Junior	Beverley, England (Beverley Grammar School)
Mark Anthony Gonzalez	Evansville	Midfielder	Senior	Toronto, Canada (Robert F. Hall Catholic)
Mueng Sunday	Drake	Midfielder	Junior	Coralville, Iowa (Iowa City West)
James Wypych	Drake	Midfielder	Junior	Wellington, New Zealand (St. Patrick’s College/New Mexico)
Alec Bartlet	Drake	Defender	Senior	Overland Park, Kansas (St. James Academy/Creighton)
Austin Ledbetter	SIUE	Defender	Junior	St. Charles, Missouri (CBC)
Eric Schoendorf	Loyola	Defender	Senior	Delafield, Wisconsin (Catholic Memorial)

==== 2015 MVC All-Conference Second Team ====
Player	School	Position	Class	Hometown (High school/Previous college)
Kyle Dal Santo	SIUE	Goalkeeper	Sophomore	Bolingbrook, Illinois (Benet Academy)
Devyn Jambga	SIUE	Forward	Sophomore	Harare, Zimbabwe (Harare International)
Nate Opperman	Evansville	Forward	Senior	Olathe, Kansas (Olathe South)
Elliot Collier	Loyola	Midfielder	Sophomore	Hamilton, New Zealand (Saint Paul’s Collegiate)
Ivan Gutierrez	SIUE	Midfielder	Junior	Hallandale Beach, Florida (Hallandale/Louisville)
Fabian Lifka	Loyola	Midfielder	Freshman	Kelkheim, Germany (Taunusgymnasium Koenigstein)
Paul Scheipeter	SIUE	Midfielder	Senior	St. Louis, Missouri (Vianney/Indianapolis)
Kyle Thomson	Loyola	Midfielder	Sophomore	Park Ridge, Illinois (Maine South)
Justin Bilyeu	SIUE	Defender	Senior	St. Louis, Missouri (CBC)
Daniel Hare	Loyola	Defender	Senior	Overland Park, Kansas (Rockhurst)
Brett Lane	SIUE	Defender	Senior	Peoria, Illinois (Peoria Notre Dame)

==== 2015 MVC All-Freshman Team ====
Player	School	Position	Hometown (High school)
Conor Ingram	Missouri State	Forward	Oxford, England (Fitzharrys School)
Nic Jaimes	Drake	Forward	Olathe, Kansas (Blue Valley Northwest)
Connor Stevenson	Loyola	Forward	Woodbury, Minnesota (East Ridge)
Frank Bak	Bradley	Midfielder	Glenview, Illinois (Glenbrook South)
Zac Blaydes	Evansville	Midfielder	Midway, Kentucky (Woodford County)
Jake Buckle	Missouri State	Midfielder	Tadcaster, North Yorkshire, England (Tadcaster Grammar)
Chris Holmes	Central Arkansas	Midfielder	Conway, Arkansas (Little Rock Catholic)
Daltyn Knutson	Central Arkansas	Midfielder	Spring, Texas (Klein Oak)
Fabian Lifka	Loyola	Midfielder	Kelkheim, Germany (Taunusgymnasium Koenigstein)
Keegan McHugh	SIUE	Midfielder	St. Charles, Mo. (Francis Howell)
Trevor Baum	Evansville	Defender	Keller, Texas (Nolan Catholic)

==== 2015 MVC All-Tournament Team ====
Source=

2015 Missouri Valley Conference Men's Soccer Tournament MVP— Kyle Whigham, Drake

Player	School	Position
Alec Bartlett	Drake	Defender
Justin Bilyeu	SIUE	Defender
Kyle Dal Santo	SIUE	Goalkeeper
Alex Garcia	Bradley	Midfielder
James Grunert	Drake	Defender
Daniel Hare	Loyola	Defender
J.T. Kotowski	Bradley	Defender
Austin Ledbetter	SIUE	Defender
Darrin MacLeod	Drake	Goalkeeper
Rob Oslica	Missouri State	Defender
Daylon Schiffel	Central Arkansas	Forward
Eric Schoendorf	Loyola	Defender
Kyle Whigham	Drake	Midfielder

==== 2015 MVC Men's Soccer Scholar-Athlete Team ====
Source=

Player	School	Year	GPA	Major	Hometown (High School / Previous School)
Alec Bartlett	Drake	Senior	3.51	Biology	Overland Park, Kansas (St. James Academy)
Grant Bell	Bradley	Senior	3.27	Business Management/Administration	Little Falls, Minnesota (Little Falls Community)
Clark Emerson	Bradley	Sophomore	4.00	Mechanical Engineering	Grand Prairie, Texas (Mansfield Lake Ridge)
James Grunert	Drake	Sophomore	3.70	Health Sciences	Muskego, Wisconsin (Muskego)
Daniel Hare	Loyola	Senior	3.84	Sports Management	Overland Park, Kansas (Rockhurst)
Andrew Kovacevic	Bradley	Junior	3.96	Finance	Naperville, Illinois (Neuqua Valley)
Ben LeMay	Drake	Junior	3.82	Pharmacy	Hugo, Minnesota (Saint Thomas Academy)
Rob Osclica	Missouri State	Sophomore	3.79	Cell & Molecular Biology	Ozark, Missouri (Ozark)
Eric Schoendorf	Loyola	Senior	3.75	Accounting	Delafield, Wisisconsin (Catholic Memorial)
Mueng Sunday	Drake	Junior	3.68	Finance	Coralville, Iowa (Iowa City West)
Jacob Wieser	SIUE	Senior	3,96	Nursing	St. Louis, Missouri. (St. Mary's)
James Wypych	Drake	Junior	3.69	International Business	Wellington, New Zealand (St. Patrick's College)
