= 2016 SIU Edwardsville Cougars men's soccer team =

American college soccer season

2016 SIU Edwardsville Cougars men's soccer

MVC Tournament Champions

NCAA Division I Men's Soccer Tournament 3rd round/Sweet 16
- Conference: Missouri Valley Conference

Ranking
- Coaches: No. 22
- Record: 10–5–7 (4–1–3 MVC)
- Head coach: Mario Sanchez (2nd season)
- Assistant coach: Jeremy Proud; Scott Gyllenborg; Mark Weigand (GA); Billy Berger (Director of Operations)
- Home stadium: Ralph Korte Stadium; Capacity, 4,000

2016 Missouri Valley Conference men's soccer standings
| | Conf. | | | | | Overall |
| Team | W | | L | | T | W | | L | | T |
|---|---|---|---|---|---|---|---|---|---|---|
| No. 21 Loyola Chicago + | 6 | – | 1 | – | 1 | 14 | – | 4 | – | 1 |
| No. 22 SIUE ‡ | 4 | – | 1 | – | 3 | 10 | – | 5 | – | 7 |
| Evansville | 4 | – | 2 | – | 2 | 9 | – | 8 | – | 3 |
| Central Arkansas | 4 | – | 3 | – | 1 | 7 | – | 7 | – | 3 |
| Missouri State | 3 | – | 4 | – | 1 | 9 | – | 8 | – | 2 |
| Drake | 2 | – | 5 | – | 1 | 6 | – | 12 | – | 1 |
| Bradley | 0 | – | 7 | – | 1 | 2 | – | 15 | – | 3 |
‡-MVC Tournament Champion +-Invited to the NCAA Division I Men's Soccer Championship; As of 13 December 2016; Rankings from NSCAA

The 2016 SIU Edwardsville Cougars men's soccer team represented Southern Illinois University Edwardsville during the 2016 NCAA Division I men's soccer season, the school's 50th season. The Cougars were coached by Mario Sanchez. The team played their home games on Bob Guelker Field at the Ralph Korte Stadium as an affiliate member of the Missouri Valley Conference (MVC).

== Preseason ==
Fourteen players returned from the 2015 squad that won the Missouri Valley Conference Men's Soccer regular season championship. They were joined by a redshirted starting midfielder from 2013 who missed the last two seasons with injuries. All but two of the fifteen had started games for the Cougars. The returners were joined by eleven incoming freshmen and three transfer students who all started games for their previous schools. Included among the returning players were All-MVC First Team member Austin Ledbetter; Second Team members Kyle Dal Santo, Ivan Gutierrez; and Devyn Jambga; and All-Freshman Team member Keegan McHugh.

In the spring, the Cougars played two professional sides from the United Soccer League, losing to Louisville City FC and drawing with Saint Louis FC. They also faced three Division I clubs, defeating UMKC of the Western Athletic Conference, while tying Wisconsin and falling to Indiana of the Big Ten Conference.

For the fall preseason, the Cougars were scheduled to play exhibition games versus three teams that were in the 2015 NCAA Division I Men's Soccer Championship tournament. First, SIUE hosted the Notre Dame Fighting Irish, who advanced to the third round of the tournament and ended the season ranked #8. They then traveled to the Conference USA regular season champ and 17th ranked Kentucky Wildcats. The preseason closed out with a visit from the Dayton Flyers, who led Division I in scoring last season.

On July 20, the National Soccer Coaches Association of America (NSCAA) released the "Watch List" of the early contenders for the 2016 Missouri Athletic Club's (MAC) Hermann Trophy, the most prestigious individual award in college soccer that is presented annually to the outstanding male and female players of the year. Among the 28 players named to the men's list was SIUE defender Austin Ledbetter, who had previously been named as a member of last season's NCAA Division I Men's All-West Region First Team.

Only four days into training the Cougars hosted 9th ranked Notre Dame in a "friendly" exhibition, While the Fighting Irish went with a different eleven in each half, the SIUE made only five substitutions, allowing the anticipated "regulars" to get game-time playing together, since seven of them are new to the program. The Cougars out-shot the Irish 5-4, while Notre Dame had more corners, 2–1. The essentially evenly matched teams walked away with a scoreless draw.

Two days after the draw with Notre Dame, the Cougars traveled to Lexington, Kentucky to face the UK Wildcats, a team that was ranked most of last season. The SIUE offense improved to the point of banging four shots off the posts, but they failed to put one inside the net. Meanwhile, the Cougar defense played in its usual stalwart manner, at the result was another 0–0 draw.

On August 18, the MVC released the 2016 Men's Soccer Preseason Poll and 2016 Men's Soccer Preseason All-Conference Team. In the poll of the MVC's seven head coaches, SIUE was picked to repeat as conference regular season champions. Cougars named to the eleven member All-Conference Team were forward Devyn Jambga, midfielder Ivan Gutierrez, and defender Austin Ledbetter.

When College Soccer News released its 2016 Preseason All-America Teams, SIUE defender and captain Austin Ledbetter was named to the Third Team.

Hero Sports News named Austin Ledbetter to its D1 Men's Soccer Preseason All-America Team 2016 Second Team.

The preseason's final exhibition was notable for six yellow cards issued on only sixteen fouls as SIUE and visiting Dayton met in a defensive struggle. The Cougars held last season's NCAA-leading scoring team to only three shots en route to the shutout win. The Flyers' defense kept the Cougars from getting off shots for much of the game before the SIUE offense started to click with a flurry of late shots. Australian forward Lachlan McLean scored in the 89th minute on a pass from Ohio State transfer Greg Solawa to wrap up the Cougars' preseason with a 1–0–2 record. SIUE's goalkeeper Kyle dal Santo had three complete-game shutouts.

On August 24, Top Drawer Soccer (TDS) released its annual Preseason Men's National Top 100 list of their top 100 Division I soccer players. SIUE defender and captain Austin Ledbetter was #53 on the list, the first Cougar listed since Matt Polster in 2014. In the TDS listing of picks as the Preseason Top 20 players in the MVC, Austin Ledbetter was #1, Devyn Jambga #7, Ivan Gutierrez #8, and Kyle dal Santo #12.

== Season ==
The regular season started on August 26.

In non-conference action, the Cougars faced nine opponents from eight conferences. Most of those teams were coming off of successful 2015 seasons, including the Big Ten's regular season champion Ohio State Buckeyes. In addition to travelling to Columbus, SIUE visited Butler in Indianapolis, the Memphis Tigers, and Xavier in Cincinnati. In home games, the Cougars played host to Northern Illinois, Valparaiso, Cal State Northridge, Lipscomb, and IUPUI.

The MVC schedule expanded this season from six to eight games, with each school playing a home-and-home series against two others. SIUE played home and away games versus the Bradley Braves and Loyola Ramblers. The Cougars hosted the Drake Bulldogs and Missouri State Bears and went on the road to face the Central Arkansas Bears and Evansville Purple Aces.

The Cougars opened the season at home, hosting the Northern Illinois Huskies, who played a very physical game, with the visitors from the Mid-American Conference racking up 14 fouls and 3 yellow cards. In the 17th minute, the normally stingy SIUE defense turned over the ball on a straight giveaway that NIU's Molina took and passed to Voss, who fired a booming shot from 25 yards out that left Dal Santo no chance for a save, and the Huskies took a 1–0 lead that held through halftime. The Cougars returned from the break fired up and working hard for a shot. When the Huskies were called for a handball inside the 18 yard box in the 57th minute, Ledbetter stepped up and fired in the penalty shot to tie the score. For the remainder of regulation time and through two extra time periods, the two offenses jockeyed to find a good shot, and the defenses turned away attack after attack. After 110 minutes, the game ended in a 1–1 draw.

The Monday night game versus Valparaiso of the Horizon League went into the books as a scoreless draw, but SIUE was thoroughly outplayed by the Crusaders. The Cougars' passing was frequently careless, and the team as a whole, seemed reluctant to shoot the ball. After having a man sent off in the 60th minute and playing a man short for 50 minutes, Valpo still outshot the home team 14–9, even with the Cougars taking seven corner kicks. After three exhibition games and two double-overtime games, the SIUE offense has managed only one goal (the PK in the NIU game was scored by a defender).

The trip to Indianapolis for a Saturday night game against the Big East's Butler ended in disappointment. The Cougars did have more corner kicks with 6 to the Bulldogs' 5. but they also had more fouls (18–8) and yellow cards (2–0). Butler had 18 shots to SIUE's 7 and led 6–1 in shots-on-goal. The home team took the lead on a rebounded blocked shot put into the net in the 26th minute. The Cougars managed to then hold off the hosts until only a minute and a quarter remained, when a shot was snaked into the corner of the net from 20 yards out.

Cal State Northridge's visit to SIUE was moved to an hour earlier to try to avoid weather, but lightning delayed things almost to the original start time. The Matadors fouled a Cougar hard inside the box in the 5th minute. setting up Ledbetter's second PK goal of the season for the early Cougar lead. Twenty minutes into the game, there was another stoppage for lightning and another 1/2 hour delay. After the lightning delays, a shortened halftime was planned, until the power went out for the entire SIUE campus. Once the second half started, the game played out to the end. CSUN pressed and pressed the attack, out-shooting the Cougars 13 to 8, but the home team's defense turned away attack after attack, and Dal Santo made six saves in addition to preventing own-goals by corralling balls headed by Cougars that went off the post and the crossbar. After trying every two-man pairing from among six players for a two-striker offense, Coach Sanchez returned the Cougars to a single-striker setup; although they still did not score, the offense was more of a threat as SIUE picked up the first win of the season.

On a Tuesday night at Memphis, the Cougars initially looked like their offense was finally starting to click when Solawa drove down the field and crossed a pass into the box, where Jambga slotted it past the Tigers' keeper for the season's first SIUE score from the field and the 1–0 lead in the 12th minute. After falling behind, the hosts from the American Athletic Conference shifted into a higher attack gear. Memphis took shot after shot, nut the Cougar defense and keeper Dal Santo held firm well into the second half. Although Memphis committed more fouls and was given four second-half yellow cards, it was SIUE who was called for a foul inside the box, setting up the penalty kick that tied the game in the 77th minute. Having never won at Memphis, the Cougars would have settled for a draw, but, as the clock wound down, the Tigers took a shot off a crossing pass, and the SIUE block was directed past Dal Santo with only nine seconds left in the game.

The match against Lipscomb of the Atlantic Sun Conference was a contest of defenses with the two squads managing to get off only three shots in the first half. The Cougars picked up the pace in the second half, but the Bisons' keeper made four of his six saves to hold the home team scoreless. SIUE's defense turned away everything sent at them, but made a bad habit of clearing the ball over the end line to set up Lipscomb corner kicks. The game was still scoreless with less than two minutes remaining in the second extra period when the Bisons set up for their eighth corner of the game. Cougar defenders turned away two Lipscomb headers, but the final clearance rebounded off a charging Bisons forward, falling into the net past a stunned Dal Santo.

The Cougars opened their MVC schedule on a Saturday night in Chicago at #17 Loyola in a battle of the top two defenses in the conference. As expected, both defenses repeatedly turned back their opponents' offenses. The game was scoreless into the 76th minute, when a Ramblers forward got his cleats on a perfectly placed crossing pass only five feet in front of the goal mouth for what would be the only score of the game. SIUE had two near misses at tying the score, including a Jambga shot off the post, but Loyola remained the only unbeaten, untied team in Division I.

For the Wednesday night game at the Big 10's Ohio State, the Cougars looked to have finally found their scoring touch, even if the defense started out on shaky, wet ground. OSU's first shot was a rocket off a crossing pass that was too fast for Dal Santo to reach, giving the Buckeyes the 1–0 lead in the 8th minute. Ten minutes later, Ebbesen headed a midfield pass to former Buckeye Solawa, who fired it through to Jambga, who was racing toward the goal and fired a 16-foot shot into the back of the net, upping the score to 1–1. On a 27th minute corner kick, an OSU header, only their second shot on goal, eluded Dal Santo to put the home team back in the lead 2–1. As the clock wound down on the first half, the Cougars earned a corner kick of their own; on a classic Kendall-Moullin high-pass-to-a-leaping-crowd, Gabe Christianson headed the ball into the net with 7 seconds remaining, for a 2–2 score on his first goal since November 2, 2013 after missing two seasons with injuries. The Buckeyes tried to turn up the heat in the second half, but the Cougar defense returned to its stalwart form, with Dal Santo making three strong saves. As the end of regulation time neared, McHugh sent a back-heel pass to Jambga, who shot hard and low toward the far post from fifteen yards out with one minute left on the clock for what would be the game winner.

Drake, winner of the 2015 MVC tourney at The Ralph returned for SIUE Homecoming. Though the Bulldogs took more shots, the Cougars fairly well dominated possession in the first half. In the 27th minute, Solawa scored his first goal as a Cougar, returning a blocked Jambga shot over the Drake keeper's head. Holding the 1–0 lead through halftime, SIUE came back out fired up, narrowly missing additional goals in the early second half. In the 74th minute, Drake got a breakaway, and Kendall-Moullin was sent off after making a potentially goal-saving hard tackle. The Bulldogs stepped up their attack after gaining the man-advantage. Flooding the box with bodies on a corner kick, Drake evened the score at 1–1 in the 77th minute. The Cougar defense held firm into the last minute of regulation time, when a Bulldog forward piled atop Dal Santo as he covered a save, and both sides went a man down for extra time. In the 94th minute, Ebbesen and Solawa traded passes before Ebbesen hit Lachlan McLean five yards out, with the Australian sophomore turning and firing into the top of the net to complete the ninth consecutive Homecoming victory since SIUE returned to Division I.

IUPUI of the Summit League visited The Ralph for a Tuesday night game. Ebbesen opened the SIUE scoring in the 14th minute off a short cross from Jambga. With the defense clicking, Cougar captain and defensive leader Ledbetter put on his offensive cap; when Awad popped a pass into the box in the 67th minute, Ledbetter headed it into the net for the 2–0 lead. In the 75th minute, McHugh sent a corner kick to the middle of the 6 yard box that Polster put into the net for his first Cougar goal. Dal Santo made five saves en route to his third shutout of the season (14th career) as SIUE won its 3rd consecutive game.

The Cougars made a Saturday trip to Peoria for the first of two scheduled MVC games versus Bradley. Dal Santo made four saves in his fourth shutout of the year, but the Braves' Ketterer made six in his third. The tie ran the SIUE unbeaten streak to four games.

SIUE hosted Missouri State in a Tuesday night MVC match. The Bears, riding a three-game win streak, struck early, tallying on a 3rd minute corner that was headed into the net. The Cougars got the tying goal in the 34th minute, when MSU was called for a handball in the box, and Ledbetter nailed his third penalty kick of the season. The game then became a typical Valley defensive struggle, as both offenses pushed, but both defenses pushed back harder. Late in regulation time, the Bears turned away a Cougar corner kick, but McHugh sent it back in to Ledbetter, who headed it toward the goal and McLean. who scored his second game-winner with only a minute and a half left on the clock. The win upped the Cougars' unbeaten run to five games.

The Cougars traveled to Cincinnati for a Tuesday night game versus Xavier of the Big East with both teams on unbeaten streaks– four games for the Musketeers and five for the Cougars. SIUE got on the board in the 14th minute; Kendall-Moullin headed McHugh's corner away from the Xavier keeper, and Gutierrez tipped it into the net for his first score of the season. The defenses then took control, as the Musketeers turned away the Cougars' relentless attack, and the SIUE defense only allowed 4 shots-on-goal for Dal Santo to save on the way to his fifth shutout of the year. The Cougar unbeaten streak is at six, with only four MVC games remaining on the schedule.

Bradley visited Edwardsville on a Saturday night for the second half of the season's home-and-home series with SIUE. The Cougars got on the board quickly, when Jambga passed to McLean in the box, who then knocked it to Guiterrez at the top of the box, who fired it into the net only a minute and two seconds into the game. Barely three minutes later, Hackett passed through the Braves' defenders to Awad, who centered a pass that Jambga buried to put the Cougars up 2–0. With a minute, 20 seconds remaining in the first half, SIUE claimed a 3–0 advantage after Solawa played the ball into a mob in the six yard box that found the net off either a Cougar or a Brave that was credited to "Unknown," In the second half, the Cougars mostly played solid defense, except for a repeated failure to clear the ball in the 63rd to 65th minute that ended up breaking an extended Bradly scoring drought that had lasted since October 1, with four shutouts in the stretch. The 3–1 win ran the SIUE unbeaten streak to seven games and moved the Cougars into a 3-way tie for second in the MVC behind 15th ranked Loyola.

The Cougars journeyed to Conway, Arkansas for a Wednesday night game at Central Arkansas with both sides riding three-game win streaks. SIUE unleashed 28 shots, the most in a dozen years, but were unable to carry out a sustained attack. Despite playing a man down for over 96 minutes, the Bears defense repeatedly anticipated the Cougars' shots and turned them aside. SIUE's Dal Santo and UCA's Olsen are the two top goalkeepers in the MVC for save percentage, and both not only made at least one spectacular save, but both also made stops on penalty kicks that would have won the game. The Cougars unbeaten streak is now at eight games with the 11th ranked Loyola Ramblers next up at The Ralph on Saturday night.

The #11 Loyola Ramblers came to town for the second half of the teams' home-and-home series. The Cougars had been on an eight-game unbeaten run since losing 1–0 at Loyola. Both teams put up the expected staunch defensive fight through the first half and beyond. In the 57th minute, McLean fired a perfect long pass to a streaking Jambga; the lone defender lost his footing, putting Jambga one-on-one with the Rambler keeper. who could do nothing to stop Jambga's low shot to the far post that would be his third game-winner of the season (6th career). Loyola stepped up the pressure and tried hard to even the score, taking six of their eleven shots in the last fifteen minutes, but SIUE held firm, with Dal Santo only needing to make two saves for his seventh shutout of the season. With only one game remaining, the Cougars sit only 2 points behind the Ramblers for the MVC crown.

The regular season closer had the 2nd place Cougars in 3rd place Evansville's house on a Saturday night. SIUE's lead was a slim single point, with both teams still having an outside chance at the MVC title if Loyola should falter. The Cougars scored first when McLean beat two defenders and the Aces' keeper before netting his third goal of the season in the 12th minute. In the 30th minute, the Purple Aces got a pass to a man in the box, who managed to get it past Dal Santo to tie the score. Closing out a winning season after a couple of down years, Evansville was hungry for the win and really put the pressure on the SIUE defense, out-shooting the Cougars 20–8 with 10 shots on goal, but Dal Santo showed why he is again among the leaders of the NCAA goalkeepers' statistics by making nine saves. With the draw, the Cougars wound up the regular season with a ten-game unbeaten streak (7–0–3) after starting the season 1–4–2. They also secured second place in the Valley and a bye through to the semifinals of the 2016 Missouri Valley Conference Men's Soccer Tournament.

== Postseason ==
The postseason began with the 2016 Missouri Valley Conference men's soccer tournament, November 8–13 at Missouri State University. The Cougars are the #2 seed and had a bye through to the semifinals on November 11.

Six days after their draw in Evansville, the 2nd seeded Cougars and 3rd seeded Evansville Purple Aces met up again at Missouri State with a strong wind blowing north to south, putting it at one team's backs and in the other's faces. With the wind at their backs, SIUE took the lead in the 25th minute when MVC Player-of-the-Year Ledbetter took control of a corner kick and blasted it into the net. In the second half, with the wind now behind them, Evansville doubled their effort, just as they had at home. At almost the 58 minute mark, the Cougars' defense took the ball away. Awad passed downfield to Jambga who was charging down the right toward the Aces' goal with Duncan matching him to the left. As Jambga entered the box against the challenging keeper, he passed to Duncan, who coolly scored his first Cougar goal. Falling behind 2–0 Evansville redoubled their effort, eventually out-shooting SIUE 16–6. In the 81st minute, the Aces' McGrath able to head a free kick into the net and close to 2–1. With only 20 seconds left in the game, it was McGrath and Dal Santo face-to-face, and the Cougars' keeper batted away the point-blank shot with both hands to preserve the win. SIUE advanced to the MVC Final with an eleven-game unbeaten streak to face host Missouri State, who upset 13th ranked Loyola 2–1 in overtime in the other semifinal.

The MVC Awards were announced at the banquet held on the evening between the tournament quarterfinals and semifinals. Austin Ledbetter was named both MVC Defensive Player of the Year and MVC Player of the Year. Ledbetter is only the second MVC player to earn both honors, following Loyola's Eric Schoendorf in 2015. On the MVC All-Conference First Team, Austin Ledbetter was joined by Devon Jambga. The 2016 MVC All-Conference Second Team included Cougars Kyle Dal Santo, Mohamed Awad, and Andrew Kendall-Moullin. Lachlan McLean was named to the 2016 MVC All-Freshman Team, and Ivan Gutierrez, Keegan McHugh, and Greg Solawa received MVC All-Conference Honorable Mentions.

In The MVC Final, the Cougars faced Missouri State and their waves of substitutes on the Bears' home field. Early on, both sides mostly controlled the ball in their own end of the field, looking for chance to attack. In the 37th minute, Jambga took the ball away, worked downfield and left through several defenders, cut right at the top of the 18 yard box, and slammed a hard, low shot just inside the post for the game's only goal on what would be the Cougars' only shot of the game. For the remainder of the game, MoSt attacked, SIUE turned the attack aside, and the two teams did the same all over again and again, even after the Bears went a man down when Dal Santo was fouled hard while covering a loose ball in the box. The win gave the Cougars their second MVC Tournament title and automatic qualification to the NCAA Tournament in three years. They took their trophy and their twelve-game unbeaten streak home to wait to see who they would face in the NCAAs.

The 2016 MVC Men's Soccer All-Tournament Team included Cougars Kyle Dal Santo, Devyn Jambga, Keegan McHugh, and tournament Most Valuable Player Austin Ledbetter. Additionally, Austin Ledbetter was named to the College Soccer News National Team of the Week.

On the November 14 NCAA Selection Show for the 2016 NCAA Division I Men's Soccer Championship. the Cougars were announced as facing the 12th-ranked Michigan State Spartans in Ann Arbor on November 17. The winner advances to play the 15th-ranked and 15th-seeded Butler Bulldogs in Indianapolis on November 20. (When the NSCAA released the new rankings the following day, Michigan State was #13 and Butler #11.)

The Cougars opened their 23rd NCAA tournament at 13th ranked Michigan State of the Big Ten Conference. A strong wind was at MSU's back in the first half and SIUE's in the second. Dal Santo had already made saves when, in the 40th minute, the Spartan's Marcantognini unleashed a wind-aided blast from 25 yards out that went into the upper corner of the net past a lunging Dal Santo. Although, as has often been the case this season, Michigan State took many more shot than the Cougars, 19–9, SIUE has been much more accurate than their opponents, scoring on 11% of their shots, versus 6% for the opponents. In the 68th minute, Awad took an errant MSU pass and passed it to McHugh who unleashed an accurate, wind-aided long shot from 30 yards out into the upper corner of the net to even the score. For the rest of regulation time and through two 10 minute extra periods, the two defenses turned away the offenses, sending the game to a penalty kick shootout. Through the requisite first five rounds, both goalkeepers made a save, to tie the PKs at 4–4 and send the shoot-out to extra rounds. In the 10th round, Dal Santo made a second save, but MSU's Hague made a remarkable kick save after going the wrong way. In the 11th round, the Spartans' kicker let loose a wild flier over the goal, and Cougar captain Ledbetter stepped up for a second shot and buried the game-winner. The official draw extended the SIUE unbeaten streak versus the Big Ten to six games (4 wins & 2 ties since losing @ Indiana in 2012) and the unbeaten streak for this season to 13 games. Next up is a rematch with #11 Butler who downed the Cougars 2–0 in early September.

The Cougars returned to the Butler Bowl to face the #11 Butler Bulldogs of the Big East Conference in an NCAA Tournament second round match. Butler entered the NSCAA national ranking immediately after beating SIUE in early September and have remained there, rising as high as 7th. On a sunny but blustery Sunday afternoon, a large contingent of Cougar fans were on hand to cheer on the stingy SIUE defense versus the high-powered Butler offense. The Bulldog offense largely dominated the game, out-shooting the Cougars 22–5 and 5–1 on goal. The Cougars defense refused to break, forcing Butler to take many more bad shots than good, while Dal Santo stopped all five shots on goal. After 90 minutes of regulation time and two 10 minute overtimes, the score remained the same 0–0 as before the opening kick. For the second straight game, SIUE went to a penalty kick shoot-out against a highly ranked team. Through the mandatory five rounds, a kicker for each team had hit the goal posts, leaving the score tied 4–4. In the sixth round, Jambga blasted a shot past the Bulldog keeper before Dal Santo made a save to advance the Cougars to the Sweet 16. Riding a 14-game unbeaten streak, SIUE next played at #2 ranked Wake Forest in Winston-Salem, North Carolina.

Following their upset wins-on-PKs, the Cougars entered the TopDrawerSoccer.com Top 25 in 21st place, and Kyle Dal Santo was named the goalkeeper on the College Soccer News National Team of the Week and the TopDrawerSoccer.com Men’s Team of the Week.

On a Sunday night in Winston-Salem, North Carolina, the Cougars challenged the #2 ranked Wake Forest Demon Deacons the tournament's #2 and highest remaining seed. Wake ranked #10 in Division I in shots per game and came out shooting. In only the 3rd minute, the Deacons' top scorer passed from the end line to their #2 scorer, Bakero, who blasted the ball into the net from 9 yards in front. On the Cougars' lone corner kick of the game, both Ebbesen and his shot on goal were knocked down by the Wake keeper, but Ledbetter got to the rebound and netted it to tie the score. SIUE looked about to take the lead in the 51st minute on a Jambga breakaway, but the Deacons' keeper, Cases Mundet, stayed with the pass to Ebbesen and blocked his point-blank shot. After repeated stops and saves by the Cougar defense, in the 72nd minute, it was again Bakero who redirected a shot that Dal Santo was ready to stop and scored the game winner. Although SIUE looked to be dominated in the statistics, out-shot 24–6 and bested on corner kicks 9–1, Wake Forest knew they had been in a fight; "“I give SIUE credit." said Wake's coach Muuss. "They were blocking shots, battling." But Wake Forest's win ended the Cougars' 14-game unbeaten streak, their 2016 season, and the college careers of Ivan Gutierrez, Jason Hackett, Andrew Kendall-Moullin, and Austin Ledbetter.

After being eliminated by Wake Forest, the Cougars remained in the TopDrawerSoccer.com Top 25, moving up to the #15 ranking, a position they would hold in the last poll before the College Cup.

On December 6, the National Soccer Coaches Association of America (NSCAA) announced the 2016 All-Region Teams. In the West Region, Austin Ledbetter was named to the First Team, Devyn Jambga to the Second Team, and Kyle Dal Santo to the Third Team.

The College Soccer News 2016 All-America Teams placed Austin Ledbetter on the Third Team.

After three seasons as a Cougars assistant coach, Scott Gyllenborg was named as the head coach of the Bearcats of Division II McKendree University on December 12.

The NSCAA's National-Final Postseason Ranking was released on December 13, 2016; the Cougars were ranked #22. In the final TopDrawerSoccer.com Top 25, the Cougars remained #15. In the final College Soccer News Top 30 Poll, SIUE was ranked for the first time of the season at #20.

On January 17, 2017, Austin Ledbetter was selected by FC Dallas in the third round of the 2017 Major League Soccer SuperDraft as the 53rd overall pick,

== Coaches ==
2016 was Mario Sanchez' second year as the Cougars' head coach. Jeremy Proud was in his first season and Scott Gyllenborg was in his third season as assistant coaches. Mark Weigand was graduate assistant for the second year. Billy Berger was the second season director of operations after two years as a graduate assistant. David Korn, who was interim co-head coach in 2014 and associate head coach in 2015 was hired away to become the head coach of the Division II Saints of Maryville University.

== Roster ==
Buff background indicates returning players from 2015. Pink background indicates players "redshirted" in 2015.

| # | Name | Nationality | Height | Weight | Class | Hometown | High school | Academy/club | Transfer from |
Goalkeepers
| 1 | Kyle Dal Santo | (United States) | 5'11" | 155 | R-Junior | Bolingbrook, Illinois | Benet Academy | Chicago Fire | |
| 29 | Joe Smith | (United States) | 6' 1" | 170 | R-Sophomore | Royal Oak, Michigan | Royal Oak | Rochester SC | |
| 30 | Nathan Chalus (redshirt) | (United States) | 6' 2" | 195 | Freshman | Carol Stream, Illinois | Glenbard North | | |
Defenders
| 2 | Andrew Kendall-Moullin | (United States) | 6' | 165 | Senior | Faribault, Minnesota | Shattuck-Saint Mary's | Shattuck-Saint Mary's | |
| 3 | Greg Fischer (redshirt) | (United States) | 5' 8" | 160 | Freshman | Prospect, Kentucky | Trinity | Derby City Rovers | |
| 4 | Kashaun Smith | (Jamaica) | 5'11" | 150 | Freshman | Kingston, Jamaica | Wolmer's Boys' | | |
| 6 | Austin Ledbetter | (United States) | 5'11" | 160 | Senior | St. Charles, Missouri | CBC | St. Louis Scott Gallagher | |
| 15 | Austin Polster | (United States) | 6' 1" | 155 | Junior | Las Vegas, Nevada | Palo Verde | Region IV Olympic Development Program | Wright State |
| 21 | Colin Miller (redshirt) | (United States) | 6' 1" | 155 | Freshman | Centennial, Colorado | Eaglecrest | Colorado Storm Academy | |
| 24 | Mark Skrivan | (United States) | 5'10" | 155 | Sophomore | Florissant, Missouri | Hazelwood West | St. Louis Scott Gallagher | |
Midfielders
| 5 | Carl Hinkson | (Barbados) | 5'10" | 155 | Sophomore | St. George, Barbados | Harrison College | Barbados Soccer Academy | |
| 8 | Mathias Ebbesen | (Norway) | 6' 2" | 163 | Sophomore | Oslo, Norway | Oslo Handelsgymnasium | Roa Football Club | |
| 10 | Keegan McHugh | (United States) | 5'11" | 160 | R-Sophomore | St. Charles, Missouri | Francis Howell | St. Louis Scott Gallagher | |
| 12 | Gabe Christianson | (United States) | 6' | 140 | R-Junior # | Cedar Rapids, Iowa | Kennedy | Eastern Iowa United | Northern Illinois |
| 16 | Ian Cerro | (United States) | 5' 8" | 135 | Freshman | Aurora, Colorado | Grandview | Colorado Storm Academy | |
| 17 | Stoil Ganev (redshirt) | (United States) | 5' 7" | 130 | Freshman | Plymouth, Minnesota | Breck School | Minnesota Thunder Development Academy | |
| 19 | Ivan Gutierrez | (United States) | 5'10" | 143 | Senior | Hallandale Beach, Florida | Hallandale | | Louisville |
| 20 | Mohamed Awad | (New Zealand) | 5' 7" | 145 | Junior | Hamilton, New Zealand | Hamilton Boys' | | St John's |
| 22 | Victor Aguiar | (United States) | 5'10" | 160 | Junior | Boca Raton, Florida | Olympic Heights | | UNC Asheville |
| 26 | Greg Solawa | (United States) | 5' 7" | 140 | Sophomore | Niles, Illinois | Niles West | Chicago Magic | Ohio State |
| 27 | Hadyn Jambga (redshirt) | (Zimbabwe) | 6' | 162 | Freshman | Harare, Zimbabwe | Harare International School | | |
Forwards
| 7 | Lachlan McLean | (Australia) | 6' | 180 | Freshman | Sydney, Australia | St Augustine's College | U-20 National Premier League | |
| 9 | Devyn Jambga | (Zimbabwe) | 6' | 175 | R-Junior | Harare, Zimbabwe | Harare International School | | |
| 11 | Jason Hackett | (United States) | 5'7" | 150 | Senior | St. Louis, Missouri | Vianney | St. Louis Scott Gallagher | |
| 13 | Joel Duncan | (United States) | 6" | 155 | R-Junior | Mt. Vernon, Illinois | Mt. Vernon | Scott Gallagher Metro | |
| 14 | Eric Tejada | (United States) | 5' 8" | 145 | Freshman | Collinsville, Illinois | Collinsville | U.S. Soccer Development Academy | |
| 18 | Clayton Pearson | (United States) | 6' 1" | 170 | Freshman | Edwardsville, Illinois | Edwardsville | Scott Gallagher Metro | |
| 23 | Thomas "TC" Hull | (United States) | 5' 9" | 150 | R-Sophomore | St. Charles, Illinois | St. Charles East | Campton United SC | |
| 28 | Arman Akbarzadeh (redshirt) | (United States) | 5' 9" | 155 | Freshman | Denver, Colorado | Cherry Creek | Colorado Storm Academy | |

- (redshirt) = Players "redshirted' for the 2016 season.
- # = Originally listed as a redshirt senior, Gabe Christianson was reclassified as a junior by the NCAA due to his having missed the entire two previous seasons with injuries.

== Schedule and results ==
Source =

Visiting team on the left, home team on the right. Rankings from National Soccer Coaches Association of America (NSCAA) polls.

=== Exhibitions ===
| 08/14/2016 | #9 Notre Dame | 0–0 | SIUE | Edwardsville, Illinois |
| 7:00 PM CDT | | Report | McLean (yellow card) 81' | Stadium: Ralph Korte Stadium; Attendance: 467; Referee: Elvis Mahmutovic |

| 08/16/2016 | SIUE | 0–0 | Kentucky | Lexington, Kentucky |
| 6:00 PM CDT | | Report | | Stadium: Bell Soccer Complex; Attendance: n/a Referee: n/a |

| 08/19/2016 | Dayton | 0–1 | SIUE | Edwardsville, Illinois |
| 6:00 PM CDT | Long (yellow card) 21'; Taneski (yellow card) 47'; Lianes. (yellow card) 67'; Abubakar (yellow card) 77' | Report | Jambga (yellow card) 24'; K. Smith (yellow card) 85'; McLean 89' (Solawa) | Stadium: Ralph Korte Stadium; Attendance: 1015; Referee: Saul Gonzalez |

=== Regular season ===
| 08/26/2016 | Northern Illinois | 1–1 ^{(2OT)} | SIUE | Edwardsville, Illinois |
| 7:00 PM CDT | Voss 17' (Molina); Witkowski (yellow card) 22'; Brodie (yellow card) 57'; Garcia (yellow card) 80' | Report | Ledbetter 57' (pen.); McLean (yellow card) 71'; Hackett (yellow card) 95' | Stadium: Ralph Korte Stadium; Attendance: 788; Referee: Matt Mcintyre |

| 08/29/2016 | Valparaiso | 0–0 ^{(2OT)} | SIUE | Edwardsville, Illinois |
| 7:00 PM CDT | Thompson (yellow card) 58'; Fallet (red card) 60'; Madrid (yellow card) 90' | Report | | Stadium: Ralph Korte Stadium; Attendance: 529; Referee: Elvis Mahmutovic |

| 09/03/2016 | SIUE | 0–2 | ^{(rv)} Butler | Indianapolis. Indiana |
| 6:00 PM CDT | Ebbesen (yellow card) 69'; Gutierrez (yellow card) 81' | Report | Galliford 26'; Charalambous 89' (Timmer) | Stadium: Butler Bowl; Attendance: 643; Referee: Abdu Bensalah |

| 09/09/2016 | Cal State Northridge | 0–1 | SIUE | Edwardsville, Illinois |
| 7:00 PM CDT | Diouf (yellow card) 64'; Samayoa (yellow card) 87' | Report | Ledbetter 5' (pen.); Polster (yellow card) 78' | Stadium: Ralph Korte Stadium; Attendance: 507; Referee: Doug Wolff |

| 09/14/2016 | SIUE | 1–2 | Memphis | Memphis, Tennessee |
| 7:00 PM CDT | Jambga 12' (Solawa) | Report | Fahling (yellow card) 47'; Klipsch (yellow card) 68'; Zalzman (yellow card) 77'; Gonzalez 77' (pen.); Newton (yellow card) 84'; Cantele 90' (Bruce) | Stadium: Mike Rose Soccer Complex; Attendance: 141; Referee: Cory Richardson |

| 09/17/2016 | Lipscomb | 1–0 ^{(2OT)} | SIUE | Edwardsville, Illinois |
| 7:00 PM CDT | Kerridge (yellow card) 102'; Innes (yellow card) 105'; Sakou 109' | Report | | Stadium: Ralph Korte Stadium; Attendance: 512; Referee: Doug Ferguson |

| 09/24/2016 | SIUE | 0–1 | ^{#17} Loyola Chicago * | Chicago, Illinois |
| 7:00 PM CDT | Gutierrez (yellow card) 76' | Report | Lasinski 76' (Kraussel) | Stadium: Loyola Soccer Park; Attendance: 502; Referee: David R. Jaworski |

| 09/28/2016 | SIUE | 3–2 | Ohio State | Columbus, Ohio |
| 6:00 PM CDT | Jambga 18' (Ebbesen & Solawa); Christianson 45' (Kendall-Moullin); Gutierrez (yellow card) 40'; Jambga 88' (McHugh) | Report | Jensen 8' (Mohamed); Bergstrom 27' (Fitzpatrick); Jensen (yellow card) 56'; Kohl (yellow card) 62'; OSU Team (yellow card) 90'; Logue (red card) 90' | Stadium: Jesse Owens Memorial Stadium; Attendance: 187; Referee: Brandon Artis |

| 10/01/2016 Homecoming | Drake * | 1–2 ^{(OT)} | SIUE | Edwardsville, Illinois |
| 7:00 PM CDT | Enna 77' (Lemay); Lemay (yellow card) 83'; Sunday (yellow card) 86'; Enna (red card) 90' | Report | Solawa 27' (Jambga); Kendall-Moullin (red card) 74'; Ledbetter (yellow card) 79'; McLean 94' (Ebbesen) | Stadium: Ralph Korte Stadium; Attendance: 2651; Referee: Douglass Wolff |

| 10/04/2016 | IUPUI | 0–3 | SIUE | Edwardsville, Illinois |
| 7:00 PM CDT | Ayala (yellow card) 39'; Siasia (yellow card) 74'; Soto (yellow card) 77'; Silva (yellow card) 86' | Report | Ebbesen 14' (Jambga); Ledbetter 67' (Awad); Polster 75' (McHugh); Christianson (yellow card) 77' | Stadium: Ralph Korte Stadium; Attendance: 665; Referee: Justin Tomich |

| 10/08/2016 | SIUE | 0–0 ^{(2OT)} | Bradley * | Peoria, Illinois |
| 7:00 PM CDT | | Report | | Stadium: Shea Stadium; Attendance: 417; Referee: Jose Renda |

| 10/11/2016 | Missouri State * | 1–2 | SIUE | Edwardsville, Illinois |
| 7:00 PM CDT | Oslica 3' (Woods) | Report | Ledbetter 34' (pen.); McHugh (yellow card) 72'; Ledbetter (yellow card) 76'; McLean 89' (Ledbetter & McHugh) | Stadium: Ralph Korte Stadium; Attendance: 607; Referee: Cesar Ibarra |

| 10/18/2016 | SIUE | 1–0 | ^{(rv)} Xavier | Cincinnati, Ohio |
| 6:00 PM CDT | Gutierrez 14' (Kendall-Moullin & McHugh); Dal Santo (yellow card) 62' | Report | Pratzner (yellow card) 85'; Brown (yellow card) 90' | Stadium: XU Soccer Complex; Attendance: 715; Referee: Brandon Artis |

| 10/22/2016 | Bradley * | 1–3 | SIUE | Edwardsville, Illinois |
| 7:00 PM CDT | Link 65' (Jahic) | Report | Gutierrez 2' (McLean); Jambga 6' (Awad & Hackett); McHugh (yellow card) 22'; Team Unknown 22' | Stadium: Ralph Korte Stadium; Attendance: 535; Referee: Shane Butler |

| 10/26/2016 | SIUE | 0–0 ^{(2OT)} | Central Arkansas * | Conway, Arkansas |
| 7:00 PM CDT | McHugh (yellow card) 9'; Jambga (yellow card) 86'; Kendall-Moullin (red card) 106' | [ Report] | Stricker (red card) 9'; Sandquist (yellow card) 37'; Roman (yellow card) 89' | Stadium: Bill Stephens Track/Soccer Complex |

| 10/29/2016 Senior Night | ^{#11} Loyola Chicago * | 0–1 | SIUE | Edwardsville, Illinois |
| 7:00 PM CDT | Engesser (yellow card) 18'; Howe (yellow card) 73'; Stoneman (yellow card) 82' | Report | Polster (yellow card) 37'; Jambga 57' (McLean); Jambga (yellow card) 63'; Solawa (yellow card) 64'; Ledbetter (yellow card) 86' | Stadium: Ralph Korte Stadium; Attendance: 819; Referee: Dule Djurasevic |

| 11/05/ 2016 | SIUE | 1–1 ^{(2OT)} | Evansville * | Evansville, Indiana |
| 7:00 PM CDT | McLean 12'; McLean (yellow card) 14' | [ Report] | Robinson 30' (Koenig & Stafford-Lacey); Deweese (yellow card) 88'; Reimer (yellow card) 90' | Stadium: Arad McCutchan Stadium; Attendance: 508; Referee: William Delois |

- * = Missouri Valley Conference opponent.

=== Post-season ===
2016 Missouri Valley Conference Men's Soccer Tournament

| 11/09/2016 Quarterfinal | BYE | Springfield, Missouri |
| TBA CDT | [ Report] | Stadium: Betty & Bobby Allison South Stadium |

| 11/11/2016 Semifinal | _{(#3 Seed)} Evansville | 1–2 | SIUE _{(#2 Seed)} | Springfield, Missouri |
| 3:00 PM CST | McGrath 81' (Blaydes); McGrath (yellow card) 83'; Baum (yellow card) 8u' | Report | Ledbetter 25'; Duncan 59' (Jambga & Awad) | Stadium: Betty & Bobby Allison South Stadium; Attendance: 268; Referee: Shane Butler |

| 11/13/2016 Final | _{(#5 Seed)} Missouri State | 0–1 | SIUE _{(#2 Seed)} | Springfield, Missouri |
| 1:00 PM CST | Jones (red card) 78' | Report | Jambga 36'; Ebbesen (yellow card) 43' | Stadium: Betty & Bobby Allison South Stadium; Attendance: 679; Referee: Ben Trevino |

2016 NCAA Division I Men's Soccer Championship

| 11/17/2016 First round | ^{#13} Michigan State | 1–1 ^{(8–9 PKs)} | SIUE | East Lansing, Michigan |
| 12 Noon CST | Marcantognini 40' (Krolicki & Fiscus) | Report | McHugh 67' (Awad) | Stadium: DeMartin Soccer Complex; Attendance: 559; Referee: Hilario Grajeda |
| | Penalties |
| | Sierakowski (penalty scored); Krolicki (penalty scored); Centala (penalty scored); Corrigan (penalty missed); Lewis (penalty scored); H. Barone (penalty scored); Beckett (penalty scored); Marcantognini (penalty scored); Scott (penalty scored); Pimlott (penalty missed); Sierakowski (penalty missed) | | (penalty scored) McHugh; (penalty missed) Kendall-Moullin; (penalty scored) McLean; (penalty scored) Solawa; (penalty scored) Ledbetter; (penalty scored) D. Jambga; (penalty scored) Hinkson; (penalty scored) Gutierrez; (penalty scored) Ebbesen; (penalty missed) Christianson; (penalty scored) Ledbetter |

| 11/20/2016 Second round | ^{#11} Butler | 0–0 ^{(4–5 PKs)} | SIUE | Indianapolis, Indiana |
| Time TBA CST | Suddick (yellow card) 61'; Charalambous (yellow card) 84' | Report | Gutierrez (yellow card) 62'; Ebbesen (yellow card) 76' | Stadium: Butler Bowl; Attendance: 667; Referee: Dimitar Chavdarov |
| | Penalties |
| | (penalty scored) Suddick; (penalty scored) Timmer; (penalty missed) Lehtinen; (penalty scored) Ostrowski; (penalty scored) Goldsmith; (penalty missed) Charalambous | | (penalty scored) McHugh; (penalty scored) Kendall-Moullin; (penalty missed) McLean; (penalty scored) Solawa; (penalty scored) Ledbetter; (penalty scored) D. Jambga< |

| 11/27/2016 Round of 16 | ^{#2} Wake Forest | 2–1 | SIUE | Winston-Salem, North Carolina |
| 4:00 PM CST | Bakero 3' (Hayes); Bakero 72' (Twumasi & Argudo) | Report | Ledbedder 41' (Ebbesen); McHugh (yellow card) 55' | Stadium: Spry Stadium; Attendance: 1,942; Referee: Carmen Serbio |

== Statistics ==
Field players
| # | Name | Games | Starts | Goals | Assists | Points | Shots | Shot %age | Shots on goal | OG %age | Penalty kicks | Game winners | Yellow cards | Red cards |
| 1 | Kyle Dal Santo | 22 | 22 | 0 | 0 | 0 | 0 | — | 0 | — | 0–0 | 0 | 1 | 0 |
| 2 | Andrew Kendall-Moullin | 17 | 13 | 0 | 2 | 2 | 5 | .000 | 0 | .000 | 0–0 | 0 | 0 | 2 |
| 4 | Kashaun Smith | 11 | 4 | 0 | 0 | 0 | 0 | — | 0 | — | 0–0 | 0 | 0 | 0 |
| 5 | Carl Hinkson | 22 | 18 | 0 | 0 | 0 | 3 | .000 | 0 | .000 | 0–0 | 0 | 0 | 0 |
| 6 | Austin Ledbetter | 22 | 22 | 6 | 1 | 13 | 10 | .600 | 7 | .700 | 3–4 | 1 | 3 | 0 |
| 7 | Lachlan McLean | 21 | 11 | 3 | 2 | 8 | 27 | .111 | 12 | .444 | 0–0 | 2 | 2 | 0 |
| 8 | Mathias Ebbesen | 19 | 8 | 1 | 2 | 4 | 16 | .063 | 7 | .438 | 0–0 | 1 | 3 | 0 |
| 9 | Devyn Jambga | 22 | 19 | 6 | 3 | 15 | 36 | .167 | 20 | .556 | 0–0 | 4 | 2 | 0 |
| 10 | Keegan McHugh | 22 | 20 | 1 | 4 | 6 | 8 | .125 | 3 | .375 | 0–0 | 0 | 4 | 0 |
| 11 | Jason Hackett | 22 | 21 | 0 | 1 | 1 | 5 | .000 | 1 | .200 | 0–0 | 0 | 1 | 0 |
| 12 | Gabe Christianson | 19 | 7 | 1 | 0 | 2 | 6 | .167 | 4 | .667 | 0–0 | 0 | 1 | 0 |
| 13 | Joel Duncan | 13 | 1 | 1 | 0 | 2 | 1 | 1.000 | 1 | 1.000 | 0–0 | 1 | 0 | 0 |
| 14 | Eric Tejada | 20 | 3 | 0 | 0 | 0 | 3 | .000 | 0 | .000 | 0–0 | 0 | 0 | 0 |
| 15 | Austin Polster | 19 | 11 | 1 | 0 | 2 | 3 | .333 | 1 | .333 | 0–0 | 0 | 2 | 0 |
| 16 | Ian Cerro | 7 | 0 | 0 | 0 | 0 | 0 | — | 0 | — | 0–0 | 0 | 0 | 0 |
| 18 | Clayton Pearson | 20 | 1 | 0 | 0 | 0 | 4 | .000 | 2 | .500 | 0–0 | 0 | 0 | 0 |
| 19 | Ivan Gutierrez | 22 | 19 | 2 | 0 | 4 | 16 | .125 | 9 | .563 | 0–0 | 1 | 4 | 0 |
| 20 | Mohamed Awad | 22 | 21 | 0 | 4 | 4 | 25 | .000 | 6 | .240 | 0–0 | 0 | 0 | 0 |
| 22 | Victor Aguiar | 1 | 0 | 0 | 0 | 0 | 0 | — | 0 | — | 0–0 | 0 | 0 | 0 |
| 23 | Thomas "TC" Hull | 9 | 0 | 0 | 0 | 0 | 4 | .000 | 1 | .250 | 0–0 | 0 | 0 | 0 |
| 24 | Mark Skrivan | 2 | 0 | 0 | 0 | 0 | 0 | — | 0 | — | 0–0 | 0 | 0 | 0 |
| 26 | Greg Solawa | 22 | 21 | 1 | 3 | 5 | 45 | .022 | 14 | .311 | 0–0 | 0 | 1 | 0 |
| 29 | Joe Smith | — | — | — | — | — | — | — | — | — | — | — | — | — |
| TM | Team | 22 | 22 | — | 2 | 2 | 1 | 1.000 | 1 | 1.000 | — | — | — | |
| | Totals | 22 | 22 | 24 | 22 | 70 | 218 | .110 | 90 | .413 | 3–4 | 10 | 24 | 2 |
| | Opponents | 22 | 22 | 17 | 16 | 50 | 290 | .059 | 111 | .383 | 1–2 | 5 | 24 | 5 |
Goalkeepers
| # | Name | Games | Starts | Minutes | Goals against | GA average | Saves | Save %age | Wins | Loses | Tie | Shutouts | Yellow cards | Red cards |
| 1 | Kyle Dal Santo | 22 | 22 | 2142:23 | 17 | .714 | 88 | .838 | 10 | 5 | 7 | 9 | 1 | 0 |
| 29 | Joe Smith | — | — | — | — | — | — | — | — | — | — | — | — | — |
| TM | Team | 22 | 22 | — | — | — | 6 | — | — | — | — | — | — | — |
| | Totals | 22 | 22 | 2142:23 | 17 | .714 | 94 | .847 | 10 | 5 | 7 | 9 | 1 | 0 |
| | Opponents | 22 | 22 | 2142:23 | 24 | 1.008 | 67 | .736 | 5 | 10 | 7 | 7 | 0 | 0 |

| Additional stats | Corner kicks | Offsides | Fouls | Goals/game |
|---|---|---|---|---|
| SIUE | 91 | 28 | 281 | 1.091 |
| Opponents | 120 | 37 | 239 | .773 |

== See also ==
- 2016 Missouri Valley Conference men's soccer season
- 2016 Missouri Valley Conference Men's Soccer Tournament
