= 2015 Missouri Valley Conference men's soccer tournament =

2015 MVC men's soccer tournament
Tournament details
- Country: United States
- Teams: 6

Final positions
- Champions: Drake
- Runners-up: SIUE

Tournament statistics
- Matches played: 5
- Goals scored: 5 (1 per match)
- Top goal scorer: Nic Jaimes–Drake (2)

Awards
- Best player: Kyle Whigham–Drake

The 2015 Missouri Valley Conference men's soccer tournament was the 25th edition of the tournament. It determined the Missouri Valley Conference's automatic berth in the 2015 NCAA Division I Men's Soccer Championship. Southern Illinois University Edwardsville hosted the tournament at Ralph Korte Stadium on the SIUE campus.

The third-seeded Drake Bulldogs won the tournament, besting the top-seeded SIUE Cougars in the championship match. It was Drake's second MVC championship.

== Qualification ==
2015 Missouri Valley Conference men's soccer standings
	Conf.					Overall
Team	W		L		T	W		L		T
SIUE	5	–	1	–	0	12	–	5	–	2
Bradley	4	–	1	–	1	7	–	10	–	1
Drake ‡	3	–	1	–	2	13	–	5	–	3
Missouri State	3	–	2	–	1	6	–	6	–	5
Loyola Chicago	2	–	2	–	2	10	–	4	–	5
Central Arkansas	1	–	5	–	0	2	–	15	–	1
Evansville	0	–	6	–	0	3	–	13	–	0
‡-MVC Tournament Champion +-Invited to the NCAA Division I Men's Soccer Championship; As of November 22, 2015; Rankings from NSCAA

The top six teams in the Missouri Valley Conference based on their conference regular season records qualified for the tournament. The SIUE Cougars, Bradley Braves, Drake Bulldogs, Missouri State Bears, Loyola Chicago Ramblers, and Central Arkansas Bears earned berths in the tournament. Top-seeded SIUE and second-seeded Bradley received first round byes.

== Bracket ==
Quarterfinals
4	Loyola	1
5	Missouri State	0
6	Central Arkansas	0
3	Drake	2

Semifinals
1	SIUE Pk 4–3	0
4	Loyola	0
2	Bradley	0
3	Drake	1

Final
1	SIUE	0
3	Drake	1

== Schedule ==
November 11, 2015 Quarterfinals	#6 Central Arkansas	0–2	#3 Drake	Edwardsville, Illinois
12 Noon	Stricker (yellow card) 85'	Report	LeMay 18' A-Edel; Jaimes (yellow card) 27'; Jaimes 58' A-Enna	Stadium: Ralph Korte Stadium; Attendance: 344; Referee: Shane Butler; Assistant referees: George Major & Dule Djurasevic; Fourth official: Doug Gault

November 11, 2015 Quarterfinals	#5 Loyola	0–1	#4 Missouri State	Edwardsville, Illinois
3:00 PM	Barbero (yellow card) 84'	Report	Lifka 84' unassisted Lifka (yellow card) 90'	Stadium: Ralph Korte Stadium; Attendance: 150; Referee: Ben Trevino; Assistant referees: Mike Dutt & Collin Pressey; Fourth official: Divanbeigi

November 13, 2015 Semifinals	#3 Drake	1–0	#2 Bradley	Edwardsville, Illinois
3:00 PM	Jaimes 10' A-Sunday; Edel (yellow card) 58'	Report	Kovacevic (yellow card) 15'; Emerson (yellow card) 48'	Stadium: Ralph Korte Stadium; Attendance: 359; Referee: David Jaworski; Assistant referees: Elvis Mahmutovic & Jacob Post; Fourth official: Craig Adams

November 13, 2015 Semifinals	#5 Loyola	0–0 (a.e.t.) (3–4 p)	#1 SIUE	Edwardsville, Illinois
6:00 PM	Stevenson (yellow card) 81'; Stevenson (yellow card) 86' (yellow-red card)	Report	Jambga (yellow card) 09'	Stadium: Ralph Korte Stadium; Attendance: 765; Referee: Landis Wiley; Assistant referees: Nemanja Pandzic & Tyler Turner; Fourth official: Mike Dutt
	Penalties
	Thomson, Hare, Collier		McHugh, Christianson, Bilyeu, Ledbetter

November 15, 2015 MVC Final	#3 Drake	1–0	#1 SIUE	Edwardsville, Illinois
1:00 PM	Prusa (yellow card) 32'; Bartlett (yellow card) 40'; Ciszewski 78' unassisted	Report	Danzy (yellow card) 63'	Stadium: Ralph Korte Stadium; Attendance: 863; Referee: Jeremy Schroeder; Assistant referees: Ryan Ash & Dule Djurasevic; Fourth official: Jacob Post

== Statistical leaders ==
=== Top goalscorers ===
Rank	Player	College	Goals
1	(United States) Nic Jaimes	Drake	2
2	(United States) Ben LeMay	Drake	1
2	(Germany) Fabian Lifka	Loyola	1
2	(United States) Paul Ciszewski	Drake	1

=== Top goalkeepers ===
Rank	Player	College	Games	Saves	Save %age	Goals against average
1	(Canada) Darrin MacLeod	Drake	3	9	1.000	0.000
2	(United States) Kyle Dal Santo	SIUE	2	6	.857	0.450
3	(United States) Tim Dobrowolski	Loyola	2	5	.833	0.450

== All-tournament team ==
2015 Missouri Valley Conference Men's Soccer Tournament MVP— Kyle Whigham, Drake

Note: Flags indicate national team as defined under FIFA eligibility rules; some limited exceptions apply. Players may hold more than one non-FIFA nationality.

No.	Pos.	Nation	Player
—	DF	USA	Alec Bartlett (Drake)
—	DF	USA	Justin Bilyeu (SIUE)
—	GK	USA	Kyle Dal Santo (SIUE)
—	MF	USA	Alex Garcia (Bradley)
—	DF	USA	James Grunert (Drake)
—	DF	USA	Daniel Hare (Loyola)
—	DF	USA	Bradley (Bradley)
—	DF	USA	Austin Ledbetter (SIUE)
—	GK	CAN	Darrin MacLeod (Drake)
—	DF	USA	Rob Oslica (Missouri State)
—	FW	USA	Daylon Schiffel (Central Arkansas)
—	DF	USA	Eric Schoendorf (Loyola)
—	MF	USA	Kyle Whigham (Drake)

== See also ==
- Missouri Valley Conference
- 2015 Missouri Valley Conference men's soccer season
- 2015 NCAA Division I men's soccer season
- 2015 NCAA Division I Men's Soccer Championship
