= Logan Ketterer =

American soccer player (born 1993)

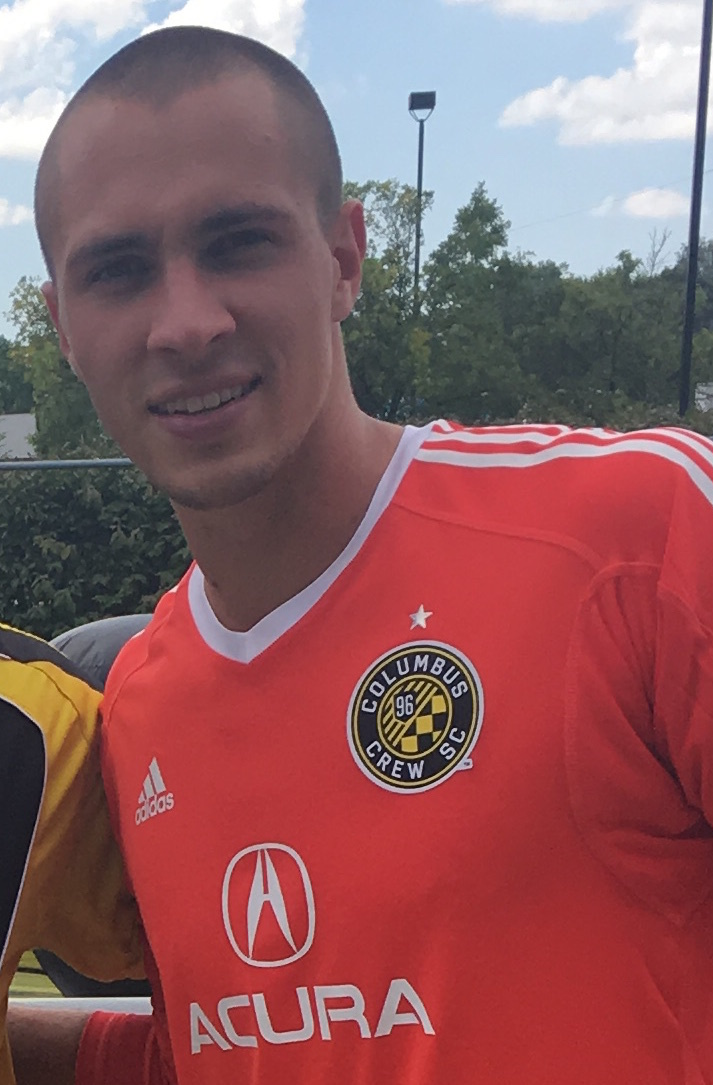
- Ketterer with Columbus Crew in 2017

Personal information
- Date of birth: November 9, 1993 (age 33)
- Place of birth: Madison, Wisconsin, United States
- Height: 6 ft 3 in (1.91 m)
- Position: Goalkeeper

Team information
- Current team: Lexington SC
- Number: 1

College career
| Years | Team | Apps | (Gls) |
| 2012–2016 | Bradley Braves | 51 | (0) |

Senior career*
| Years | Team | Apps | (Gls) |
| 2016 | Ocean City Nor'easters | 2 | (0) |
| 2017–2018 | Columbus Crew | 0 | (0) |
| 2019–2021 | El Paso Locomotive | 74 | (0) |
| 2021 | → Portland Timbers (loan) | 3 | (0) |
| 2022–2024 | CF Montréal | 0 | (0) |
| 2022–2024 | → CF Montreal U23 (loan) | 2 | (0) |
| 2025– | Lexington SC | 16 | (0) |
- * Club domestic league appearances and goals as of October 31, 2026

Logan Ketterer (born November 9, 1993) is an American professional soccer player who plays as a goalkeeper for USL Championship club Lexington Sporting Club.

Ketterer was a three-sport athlete in high school, playing basketball and tennis before turning his focus solely to soccer. He played collegiately at Bradley, appearing more than 50 times for the Braves after not playing a game through his first two seasons. During the collegiate offseason, Ketterer spent time with Ocean City Nor'easters. He was selected by Columbus Crew SC in the fourth round of the 2017 MLS SuperDraft and made his professional debut in the 2018 U.S. Open Cup.

== Early life ==
Born in Madison, Wisconsin, Ketterer attended The Prairie School in Racine, Wisconsin, where he led the Hawks to back-to-back WIAA Division 3 state championships in 2010 and 2011. His junior season, Ketterer was the first goalkeeper in state history to shut out all opponents in every playoff and state tournament match. As a senior, Ketterer was voted the All-Racine County boys soccer Player of the Year, was named to the Wisconsin Soccer Coaches Association All-State team and was the Midwest Classic Conference South Division defensive player of the year. He also played basketball and tennis before turning his focus to soccer.

== College and amateur ==
Ketterer played college soccer at Bradley. He redshirted coming out of high school in 2012, then didn't make an appearance in 2013. Ketterer entered the 2014 season, his sophomore year, as the second-string goalkeeper, but took over the starting job after an injury to starter Shay Niemeyer. He made his first appearance for the Braves on September 15, but gave up a goal in overtime to fall 1–0 to Cal State Northridge. He would pick up his first collegiate victory just four days later, however, making three saves in a 4–0 victory over Marshall. Ketterer was named the Defensive MVP of the ProRehab Aces Soccer Classic and was honored twice as the Missouri Valley Conference Defensive Player of the Week. He finished the season having allowed 14 goals in 14 games.

As a junior, Ketterer notched the only point of his collegiate career. Against Evansville on October 10, 2015, a Ketterer long ball was chipped over the Evansville keeper by Grant Bell in the 6th minute, handing Ketterer the only assist from his years at Bradley. Ketterer was named a Second Team NSCAA Scholar All-North/Central Region and earned a place on the MVC Honor Roll for the second consecutive season. He had a career-high five shutouts, but also conceded 24 goals. Ketterer closed his career in 2016 with a second consecutive Honorable Mention All-MVC honor and was named to the ProRehab Aces Soccer Classic All-Tournament Team. However, he also was sent off in his final collegiate game, getting shown a red card in the final minute of a 2–0 loss against Drake in the MVC Tourney play-in game. Ketterer ended his college career having made 51 appearances over three seasons and kept 12 clean sheets.

=== Ocean City Nor'easters ===
After his junior season at Bradley, Ketterer appeared for Premier Development League club Ocean City Nor'easters. He played in just two games: a season-opening victory against Baltimore Bohemians, and three days later a defeat against Jersey Express.

== Club career ==
=== Columbus Crew SC ===
On January 17, 2017, Ketterer was drafted by Columbus Crew SC in the fourth round (71st overall) of the 2017 MLS SuperDraft. He officially signed for the club on February 20, after taking part in preseason with the team. Ketterer opened his first professional season as the third-string goalkeeper for Columbus, behind Zack Steffen and Brad Stuver. He made the bench for seven consecutive matches early in the season, with Stuver nursing an injury, but saw no time in any of the matches. Ketterer finished the season having been named to the bench for eight matches, all in MLS play, but never made an appearance for Crew SC. On December 1, 2017, Columbus declined his contract option, but Ketterer re-signed for the club a little more than a month later. His return to Crew SC was confirmed on January 11, 2018, meaning that all four players drafted by the club in 2017 would return for the 2018 season.

Although Stuver departed the club ahead of the 2018 season, Ketterer remained as the third-string goalkeeper for Columbus after Jon Kempin was acquired in a trade from LA Galaxy. Just as in 2017, he made the bench multiple times early in the season with Kempin recovering from injury, but saw no time behind Steffen. Unlike in 2017, however, Ketterer received an opportunity for playing time midway through the season. With Steffen off on international duty, Ketterer was handed his professional debut on June 6, 2018: he got the nod for a fourth round U.S. Open Cup fixture against Chicago Fire. At the end of the season, his contract option was declined by the club; Ketterer departed Columbus with just one appearance in two seasons.

=== El Paso Locomotive FC ===
On January 18, 2019, Ketterer joined USL Championship team El Paso Locomotive FC ahead of their inaugural season. Following the 2021 season, Ketterer and El Paso mutually agreed to terminate his contract with the club.

==== Loan to Portland Timbers ====
On May 13, 2021, Ketterer joined MLS side Portland Timbers on loan for the remainder of the season following a season-ending injury to their goalkeeper Jeff Attinella. On May 15, 2021, Ketterer made his debut in a 2–0 win over the San Jose Earthquakes. He kept a clean sheet, saving a penalty kick from Chris Wondolowski.

=== CF Montréal ===
On February 16, 2022, Ketterer signed a one-year contract with CF Montréal which included two option years to further extend the contract. Ketterer made his debut for CF Montréal with a clean sheet on April 18, 2023, in a 2–0 home win against Vaughan Azzurri in a Canadian Championship match.

=== Lexington Sporting Club ===
On December 11, 2024, Lexington SC announced the signing of Ketterer for the 2025 season.

== Career statistics ==
As of December 11, 2024

| Club | Season | League | | | Playoffs | | National cup | | Continental | | Total | |
| Club | Season | Division | Apps | Goals | Apps | Goals | Apps | Goals | Apps | Goals | Apps | Goals |
|---|---|---|---|---|---|---|---|---|---|---|---|---|
| Ocean City Nor'easters | 2016 | PDL | 2 | 0 | 0 | 0 | – | | – | | 2 | 0 |
| Columbus Crew SC | 2017 | MLS | 0 | 0 | 0 | 0 | 0 | 0 | – | | 0 | 0 |
| Columbus Crew SC | 2018 | MLS | 0 | 0 | 0 | 0 | 1 | 0 | – | | 1 | 0 |
| El Paso Locomotive FC | 2019 | USLC | 32 | 0 | 3 | 0 | – | | – | | 35 | 0 |
| El Paso Locomotive FC | 2020 | USLC | 16 | 0 | 3 | 0 | – | | – | | 19 | 0 |
| Portland Timbers | 2021 | MLS | 3 | 0 | – | | 0 | 0 | – | | 3 | 0 |
| El Paso Locomotive FC | 2021 | USLC | 27 | 0 | 1 | 0 | – | | – | | 28 | 0 |
| CF Montréal | 2022 | MLS | 0 | 0 | 0 | 0 | – | | – | | 0 | 0 |
| CF Montréal | 2023 | MLS | 0 | 0 | 0 | 0 | 1 | 0 | 0 | 0 | 1 | 0 |
| CF Montréal | 2024 | MLS | 0 | 0 | 0 | 0 | 0 | 0 | 0 | 0 | 0 | 0 |
| Lexington SC | 2025 | USLC | 1 | 0 | 0 | 0 | 0 | 0 | 0 | 0 | 0 | 0 |
| Career total | | | 80 | 0 | 7 | 0 | 2 | 0 | 0 | 0 | 89 | 0 |
