= Louisville City U-23 =

American professional soccer team

Louisville City 2
- Full name: Louisville City Football Club 2
- Founded: 2020, 2026
- Dissolved: 2020
- Stadium: Woehrle Stadium
- Owner(s): Soccer Holdings, LLC
- Head Coach: Mario Sanchez
- League: USL League Two
- Website: https://www.loucity.com/
Home colors	Away colors	Third colors

Louisville City FC 2 is an American pre-professional soccer club based in Louisville, Kentucky that plays in the Valley Division of USL League Two. They are the reserve club of USL Championship club Louisville City FC.

== History ==
The club was founded to begin play in the 2020 USL League Two season. They would belong to the Great Lakes Division. They were scheduled to play their first match on May 19 against the Flint City Bucks, however, the 2020 season was cancelled due to the COVID-19 pandemic. On December 9, 2025, the United Soccer League announced the re-addition of a reserve USL League Two side of the club for the 2026 season.
