= Kyle Segebart =

American soccer player (born 1987)

Personal information
- Full name: Kyle Segebart
- Date of birth: June 22, 1987 (age 39)
- Place of birth: Winter Haven, Florida, United States
- Height: 6 ft 4 in (1.93 m)
- Position: Defender

Youth career
- CGSA Strikers
- Dayton Galaxies
- Ohio Elite SA

College career
Years	Team	Apps	(Gls)
2005	Rio Grande Red Storm		
2006–2008	Cedarville Yellowjackets		
2009	Shorter Hawks		

Senior career*
Years	Team	Apps	(Gls)
2007	Cascade Surge	13	(0)
2008	Mississippi Brilla	5	(0)
2009	Cincinnati Kings	13	(2)
2010–2011	Dayton Dutch Lions	32	(1)
2012	Island Bay United		
2012	Team Wellington		

Managerial career
- 2010: Midland Warriors (asst.)
- 2011: Dayton Flyers (volunteer asst.)
- 2012–2013: Franklin Grizzlies (asst.)
- 2014: Saginaw Valley State Cardinals (asst.)
- 2015: Saginaw Valley State Cardinals (interim)
- 2015–2016: Dayton Flyers (volunteer asst.)
- 2017–2021: Western Washington Vikings (asst.)
- 2022–2024: Central Arkansas Bears (asst.)
- 2025–: Central Arkansas Bears
- * Club domestic league appearances and goals

Kyle Segebart (born June 22, 1987) is an American soccer coach and former player who is currently head coach with the Central Arkansas Bears.

== Career ==
=== Youth and amateur ===
Segebart grew up in Dayton, Ohio, attended Northmont High School, and played club soccer for CGSA Strikers, Dayton Galaxies and Ohio Elite SA, before beginning his college soccer career at University of Rio Grande. He transferred to Cedarville University prior to his sophomore year, and played three seasons for the Yellowjackets. He appeared in 17 matches with 15 starts during his first season at Cedarville, and was voted to the All-AMC South Division Second Team, before finishing his college career at Shorter University.

During his college years Segebart also played extensively in the USL Premier Development League, for Cascade Surge, Mississippi Brilla and the Cincinnati Kings.

=== Professional ===
Segebart played with the Dayton Dutch Lions in the PDL in 2010, and turned professional in 2011 after the Lions self-promoted to the USL Professional Division in 2011. He made his professional debut on April 16, 2011, in Dayton's first game of the 2011 season, a 2–1 loss to Charleston Battery.

=== Coaching ===
Segebart joined the coaching staff of the Central Arkansas Bears in February 2022.
