= Mario Sanchez (soccer) =

American soccer player & coach (born 1975)

Personal information
- Date of birth: January 28, 1975 (age 51)
- Height: 5 ft 8 in (1.73 m)
- Position: Midfielder

Youth career
- Alta Loma SC

College career
Years	Team	Apps	(Gls)
1993–1997	Fresno State Bulldogs		

Senior career*
Years	Team	Apps	(Gls)
1996–1997	Central Coast Roadrunners		
1998–1999	Orange County Zodiac	38	(2)
2001	Stanislaus County Cruisers	14	(0)

Managerial career
- 1999–2003: Fresno State Bulldogs (assistant)
- 2003–2005: Akron Zips (assistant)
- 2006–2009: UNLV Rebels
- 2010–2015: Louisville Cardinals (assistant)
- 2015–2018: SIUE Cougars
- 2020: Louisville City U-23
- 2021: Racing Louisville (interim)
- 2024: Racing Louisville (assistant)
- 2024: FC Tulsa
- * Club domestic league appearances and goals

Mario Sanchez (born January 28, 1975) is an American soccer coach and former player who is currently the technical director for USL Championship club FC Tulsa. He is the former head coach of Louisville City U-23, the SIUE Cougars men's soccer team, and the UNLV Rebels men's soccer team.

Sanchez played professionally in the USISL and USL A-League, winning the 1996 and 1997 USISL championship with the Central Coast Roadrunners.

== Early life ==
Sanchez graduated from Etiwanda High School in 1993. He played soccer for the Alta Loma Soccer Club which won the 1992 U-17 National Championship. He attended the California State University, Fresno, playing on the men's soccer team from 1993 to 1997. In August 1996, he tore his anterior cruciate ligament in practice and lost the season. He returned in 1997 for his senior season and graduated in 1999 with a bachelor's degree in business administration.

== Club career ==
In 1996 and 1997, Sanchez spent the collegiate off-season with the Central Coast Roadrunners of the USISL. Sanchez and his teammates won the USISL championship both seasons.

On February 1, 1998, the Kansas City Wizards selected Sanchez in the third round (thirty-second overall) of the 1998 MLS College Draft. The Wizards released him in the pre-season and he signed with the Orange County Zodiac of the USL A-League. Sanchez began the 1999 season with the Zodiac, but left in July when Fresno State hired him as an assistant coach. In 2001, he returned to playing with the Stanislaus County Cruisers.

== Coaching career ==
In June 1999, Northwood High School hired Sanchez to coach its boys’ soccer team. He resigned two months later to become an assistant coach with the Fresno State Bulldogs men's soccer team. Fresno State dropped its men's soccer program after the 2003 season and Sanchez moved to the Akron Zips.

In 2006, UNLV hired Sanchez as head coach of the men's soccer program. Following UNLV's first winning season in eight years, Sanchez resigned on February 5, 2010, moving to the Louisville Cardinals, where he was an assistant coach and associate head coach 2011–2015.

On January 27, 2015, Sanchez was named the head coach of the SIU Edwardsville Cougars men's soccer team.

On November 30, 2018, Sanchez resigned to accept the position of Director of Youth Development and Community Relations for Louisville City FC of the United Soccer League. In August 2021, Sanchez was named interim head coach of Racing Louisville FC and the youth academy director for both Louisville City FC and Racing Louisville FC On January 3, 2024, Sanchez was appointed as technical director and assistant coach for Racing Louisville.

On January 16, 2024, Sanchez was announced as technical director and head coach of FC Tulsa in the USL Championship.

In November 2024, it was announced that Sanchez would operate exclusively as technical director for Tulsa. Luke Spencer was promoted from assistant coach to full-time manager.

=== Collegiate record ===
Record table
Season	Team	Overall	Conference	Standing	Postseason
University of Nevada, Las Vegas Rebels (MPSF) (2006–2009)
2006	UNLV Rebels	1–15–2	1–9–0	6th	
2007	UNLV Rebels	7–10–2	3–7–0	t-5th	
2008	UNLV Rebels	8–9–1	3–7–0	t-5th	
2009	UNLV Rebels	8–7–4	1–4–2	8th	
UNLV Rebels:		24–41–9 (.385)	8–27–2 (.243)		
Southern Illinois University Edwardsville Cougars (MVC) (2015–2016)
2015	SIUE Cougars	12–4–2	5–1–0	1st	
2016	SIUE Cougars	10–5–7	4–1–3	2nd	NCAA 3rd round/Sweet 16
SIUE Cougars (MVC):		22–9–9 (.663)	9–2–3 (.750)		
Southern Illinois University Edwardsville Cougars (MAC) (2019–present)
2017	SIUE Cougars	7–10–1	2–3–0	3rd	
2018	SIUE Cougars	9–5–4	1–3–1	5th	
SIUE Cougars:		38–24–14 (.537)	12–8–4 (.583)		
Total:		55–55–21 (.500)			
National champion Postseason invitational champion Conference regular season champion Conference regular season and conference tournament champion Division regular season champion Division regular season and conference tournament champion Conference tournament champion

== Personal life ==
Sanchez earned a bachelor's in business administration from Fresno State. He holds a U.S. Soccer Federation 'A' License.

Sanchez is married to the former Shana Stickel. The couple has four children: sons Sebastian and Santiago, and daughters Ella and Emme.
