= Austin Ledbetter =

American professional soccer player (born 1995)

Personal information
- Date of birth: July 15, 1995 (age 31)
- Place of birth: St. Louis, Missouri, United States
- Height: 1.80 m (5 ft 11 in)
- Position: Centre back

Youth career
- 2009–2013: St. Louis Scott Gallagher

College career
Years	Team	Apps	(Gls)
2013–2016	SIU Edwardsville Cougars	79	(8)

Senior career*
Years	Team	Apps	(Gls)
2014–2015	FC Tucson	19	(1)
2016	Des Moines Menace	10	(0)
2017–2018	Saint Louis FC	23	(1)
2019	FC Tucson	8	(0)
2019	→ Phoenix Rising (loan)	8	(0)
2020	Phoenix Rising	1	(0)
- * Club domestic league appearances and goals as of December 1, 2022

Austin Ledbetter (born July 15, 1995) is an American retired soccer player who last played for Phoenix Rising FC in the USL Championship.

== Career ==
=== Early career ===
A resident of St. Charles, Missouri, Ledbetter attended Christian Brothers College High School in St. Louis, where he was a second team All-State selection as well as a first team All-Metro and All-Conference pick his junior season.

He then played for St. Louis Scott Gallagher Soccer Club, where his club team advanced to the finals of the U.S. Soccer Development Academy Nationals in 2012.

Ledbetter attended Southern Illinois University Edwardsville where he played for the SIU Edwardsville Cougars. He was member of the 2013 Missouri Valley Conference (MVC) All-Freshman Team,\; an honorable mention All-MVC selection in 2014; All-Missouri Valley Conference first team and MVC All-Tournament team selection in 2015; and in 2016, was named both MVC Defensive Player of the Year and MVC Player of the Year as well as the Most Valuable Player of MVC Tournament. He was also team captain in his junior and senior seasons.

In both 2015 and 2016, Ledbetter was a National Soccer Coaches Association of America (NSCAA) All-West Region first team selection.

He also played three seasons in the Premier Development League, with FC Tucson from 2014 to 2015 and for the Des Moines Menace in 2016.

=== Professional ===
On January 17, 2017, Ledbetter was selected by FC Dallas in the third round of the 2017 Major League Soccer SuperDraft as the 53rd overall pick.

Unsigned by FC Dallas, Ledbetter signed with Saint Louis FC on February 20, 2017.
