= Central Arkansas Bears soccer =

American college soccer team

Central Arkansas Bears men's soccer
- 2025 Central Arkansas Bears soccer team
- Founded: 1996; 30 years ago
- University: University of Central Arkansas
- Head coach: Kyle Segebart (1st season)
- Conference: ASUN
- Location: Conway, Arkansas, US
- Stadium: Bill Stephens; Track/Soccer Complex
- Nickname: Bears
- Colors: Purple and gray
Home	Away

NCAA tournament College Cup
- D II: 2002

NCAA tournament Quarterfinals
- D II: 2002, 2004

NCAA tournament appearances
- D II: 2002, 2004, 2005; D I: 2017, 2018

Conference tournament championships
- GSC: MVC: 2017, 2018

Conference regular season championships
- GSC: 2002, 2005; MVC: 2018; SBC: 2019

The Central Arkansas Bears men's soccer team represents the University of Central Arkansas (UCA) in the ASUN Conference of NCAA Division I men's soccer. Before joining the ASUN on July 1, 2021, UCA had been an all-sports member of the Southland Conference, which sponsors soccer only for women, and had played men's soccer in the Sun Belt Conference. The Bears play their home matches at the Bill Stephens Track/Soccer Complex located on the UCA campus in Conway, Arkansas. The team is currently coached by Kyle Segebart.

== Roster ==
As of 30 Sep 2024

Note: Flags indicate national team as defined under FIFA eligibility rules; some limited exceptions apply. Players may hold more than one non-FIFA nationality.

No.	Pos.	Nation	Player
01	GK	USA	Javier Ramirez
1	GK	USA	Connor Wachtel
2	DF	USA	Alex Kiss
3	FW	BRB	Devonte Richards
4	DF	USA	Elijah Bishop
5	MF	USA	Lucas Shearer
6	DF	USA	Josh Baros
7	FW	CAN	Franco DiGiovanni
8	MF	JPN	Sohma Ichikawa
9	FW	USA	Michael Oliveri
10	MF	USA	Aby Gomez
11	MF	BRB	Tajio James
12	MF	USA	Andres Robles

No.	Pos.	Nation	Player
13	MF	USA	Jonathan Abusada
14	MF	CAN	Charles Brunet
16	DF	USA	Kevin Ventura (Captain)
17	DF	ESP	Joan Sureda
18	DF	JPN	Kaisei Matsudo
19	MF	USA	Cristian Marcucci
15	MF	FRA	Matheo Francou
20	MF	GER	Pharis Petrica
21	GK	CAN	Matthew Dovale
22	MF	USA	Baruc Delgado
23	FW	USA	Christian Chavez
24	DF	USA	Jaxon Hinds
25	DF	POR	Edgar Correia

== Record by year ==
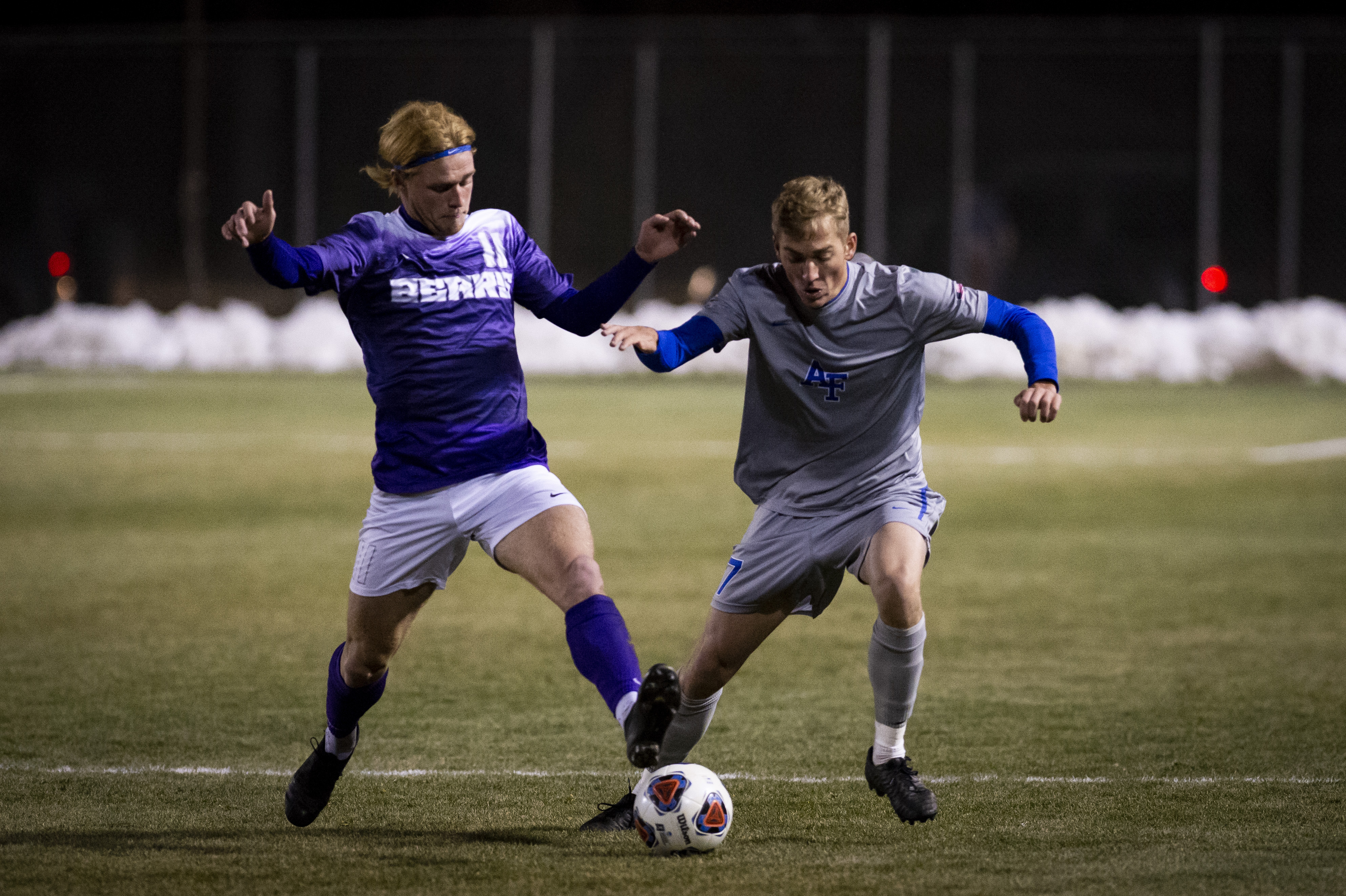
A soccer match between Central Arkansas and Air Force in 2018

Record table
Season	Coach	Overall	Conference	Standing	Postseason
Central Arkansas (Gulf South Conference (Div. II)) (1996–2005)
1996	Ryan Strong	6-11-1	0-3-1	6th	
1997	Ryan Strong	11-8-0	3-2-0	3rd	
1998	Ryan Strong	9-7-1	2-3-0	3rd (tie)	
1999	Joel Harrison	12-3-2	2-2-1	3rd	
2000	Joel Harrison	7-9-1	3-3-1	5th (tie)	
2001	Joel Harrison	13-6-0	5-2-0	3rd (tie)	
2002	Joel Harrison	17-2-2	7-0-0	1st	NCAA Div.II 3rd
2003	Chad Flanders	11-5-2	4-2-1	2nd (tie)	
2004	Chad Flanders	11-6-2	5-1-1	2nd (tie)	NCAA Div.II Elite 8
2005	Chad Flanders	14-4-2	7-1-0	1st	NCAA Div.II 1st round
Central Arkansas (Division I Independent) (2006–2009)
2006	Chad Flanders	6-8-2			
2007	Chad Flanders	6-10-0			
2008	Chad Flanders	3-14-1			
2009	Chad Flanders	7-7-1			
Central Arkansas (Missouri Valley Conference) (2010–2018)
2010	Chad Flanders	3-13-0	0-7-0	8th of 8	
2011	Chad Flanders	2-12-4	1-4-1	5th of 7	
2012	Ross Duncan	8-9-1	1-4-1	6th of 7	
2013	Ross Duncan	4-11-2	0-4-2	7th of 7	
2014	Ross Duncan	3-13-1	0-5-1	7th of 7	
2015	Ross Duncan	2-15-1	1-5-0	6th of 7	
2016	Ross Duncan	7–7–3	4–3–1	4th of 7	
2017	Ross Duncan	9–10–1	5–3–-0	2nd of 7	NCAA Tournament
2018	Ross Duncan	8–6–4	4–1–1	1st of 7	NCAA Tournament
Central Arkansas (Sun Belt Conference) (2019–2020)
2019	Ross Duncan	10–7–1	4–1–0	1st of 6	
2020	Ross Duncan	6-9-2	3-3-0	3rd of 4	
Central Arkansas (ASUN Conference) (2021–present)
2021	Frank Kohlenstein	11–6–0	5–2–0	T–1st	
2022	Frank Kohlenstein	6–5–6	5–1–2	2nd	
2023	Frank Kohlenstein	4–9–4	2–2–3	T–4th	
2024	Frank Kohlenstein	8–7–3	3–3–1	T–3rd	
2025	Kyle Segebart	0–0–0	0–0–0		
Total:		213–233–50	71–65–18		
National champion Postseason invitational champion Conference regular season champion Conference regular season and conference tournament champion Division regular season champion Division regular season and conference tournament champion Conference tournament champion
