= Max Aarons =

English footballer (born 2000)

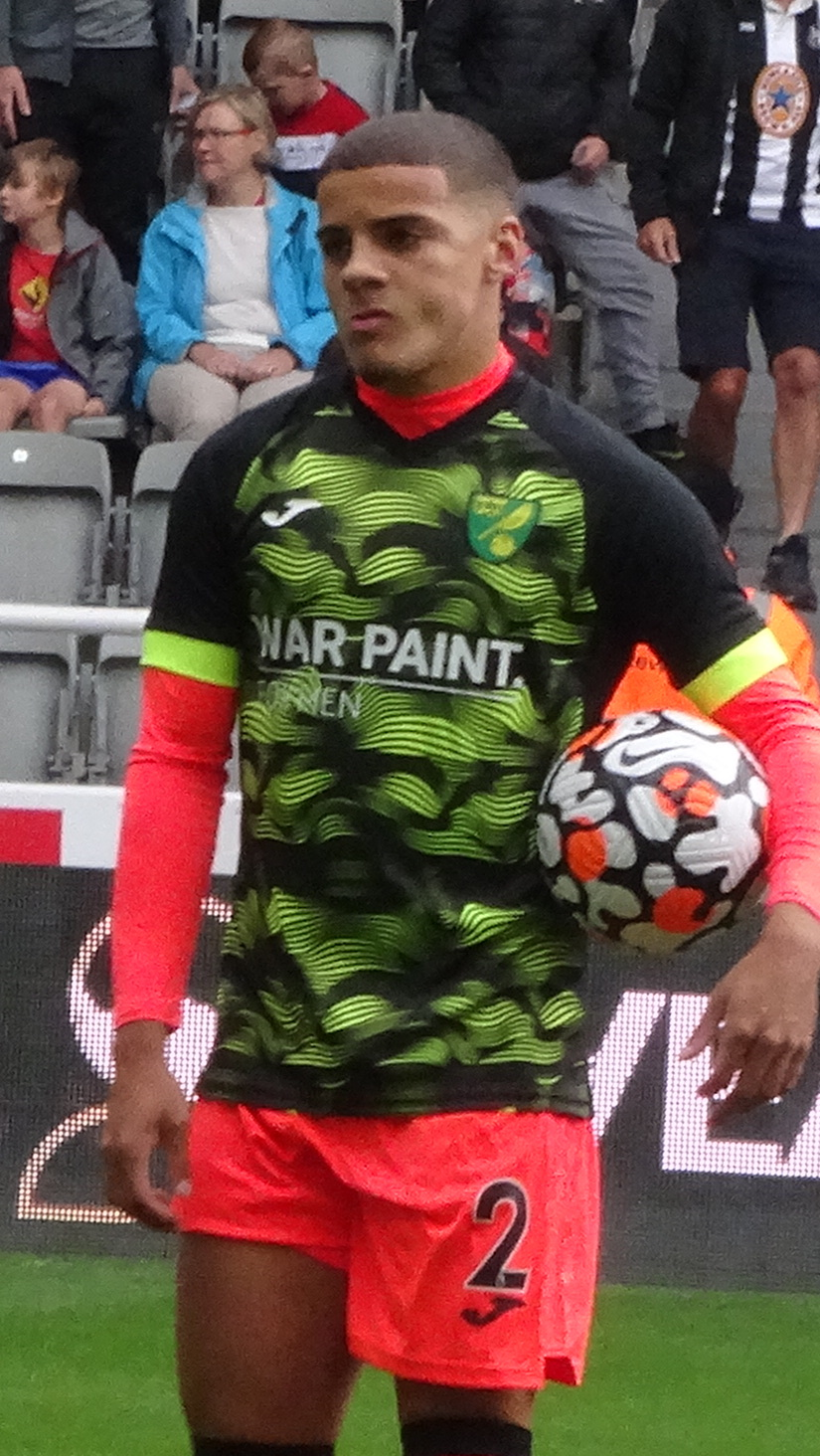
- Aarons warming up for Norwich City in 2021

Personal information
- Full name: Maximillian James Aarons
- Date of birth: 4 January 2000 (age 26)
- Place of birth: Hammersmith, England
- Height: 5 ft 10 in (1.78 m)
- Position: Right-back

Team information
- Current team: Bournemouth
- Number: 28

Youth career
- Luton Town
- 2016–2018: Norwich City

Senior career*
Years	Team	Apps	(Gls)
2018–2023	Norwich City	201	(5)
2023–	Bournemouth	23	(0)
2025	→ Valencia (loan)	4	(0)
2025–2026	→ Rangers (loan)	19	(1)

International career
2018–2019	England U19	7	(0)
2019–2023	England U21	27	(0)
Medal record
Representing England
UEFA European Under-21 Championship
Winner	2023
- * Club domestic league appearances and goals as of 23:20, 26 April 2026

Maximillian James Aarons (born 4 January 2000) is an English professional footballer who plays as a right-back for Premier League club Bournemouth.

A Norwich City youth product, Aarons joined the academy in 2016 at the age of sixteen. He went on to sign for the club professionally two years later in 2018, and quickly became a regular player for the side in the Championship. He got promoted with the side to the Premier League in 2019, and relegated back to the Championship a season later in 2020. After playing regularly and earning a nomination for EFL Young Player of the Season, the club were subsequently promoted back to the Premier League in 2021. The club would once again be relegated back to the Championship in 2022. Aarons joined top-tier English side Bournemouth in August 2023, ending a five-year tenure with the Canaries. He was later sent on loan to Spanish club Valencia in January 2025, and joined Scottish side Rangers on loan in June that year.

== Club career ==
=== Norwich City ===
Aarons began his career at Luton Town, and moved to join Norwich City's academy in 2016. He signed a three-year professional contract with the Canaries in June 2018, before making his debut in an EFL Cup game against Stevenage on 14 August. He scored in a 3–1 EFL Cup win over Cardiff City two weeks later. Aarons made his first league appearance on 2 September, starting in the East Anglian derby against Ipswich Town, a 1–1 draw. On 10 October, he extended his contract at the club until June 2023.

In March 2019, Aarons was included in the 2018–19 Championship Team of the Season, and was also awarded the 2018–19 EFL Young Player of the Season award. He was promoted with Norwich to the Premier League after a 2–1 victory over Blackburn Rovers.

In April 2021, Aarons was nominated for the EFL Young Player of the Season. In January 2022, Aarons made his 150th appearance for Norwich City in a Premier League match against West Ham United. By now, he was well-established as Norwich's first choice right back and missed only two games during the rest of the season, as a result of an injury sustained in a match against Leeds United. At the end of the season, he experienced relegation from the Premier League for the second time.

Aarons remained with Norwich for the subsequent 2022–23 season back in the Championship. In Norwich's first home game, Aarons scored an equaliser in a 1–1 draw with Wigan Athletic. He was substituted for Liam Gibbs in a match against Burnley in October, with Sam Byram replacing him for the subsequent game against Stoke City. This was the only game of the season in which Aarons played no part. After a strong start to the season, Norwich lost form and missed out on promotion. The season, and ultimately Aarons' time with Norwich, ended with a 1–0 defeat to Blackpool.

=== Bournemouth ===
On 10 August 2023, Aarons transferred to Bournemouth for a fee of £7m. On 12 August, he made his debut for the club in a 1–1 draw against West Ham United in the Premier League. He played twenty matches in this competition during the campaign, in which the team achieved a new club-record points total in the division.

=== Valencia ===
On 13 January 2025, Aarons joined La Liga side Valencia on loan from Bournemouth until the end of the 2024–25 season, with an option to make the move permanent.

=== Rangers ===
On 25 June 2025, Aarons joined Scottish Premiership club Rangers on loan for the season. On 22 July, he made his debut for Rangers in a UEFA Champions League qualifier against Panathinaikos at Ibrox. Aarons scored his first league goal on 28 September, away to Livingston in a 2–1 victory, a 94th minute winner.

== International career ==
After breaking into the Norwich City first team at the start of the 2018–19 season, Aarons earned a call-up to the England under-19 team in September 2018.

On 30 August 2019, Aarons was included in the England U21 squad for the first time. He made his debut during the 3–2 qualifying win against Turkey on 6 September 2019. Aarons was a member of the squad that were eliminated at the group stage of the 2021 UEFA European Under-21 Championship.

Despite his England caps, in March 2021 it was reported that Aarons would be called up to the Jamaica national team, as part of a plot by the Jamaican Football Federation to purposely target a number of English and English-born players for call ups in order to increase the nation's chances of qualifying for the 2022 World Cup. JFF president Michael Ricketts claimed that Aarons was going to apply for a Jamaican passport in order to play for the nation. However, Aarons subsequently revealed he had not been contacted by Jamaica, stating: "I am able to play for Jamaica but I never heard anything from them or whatever. I had people messaging me, a few family members from Jamaica, and I had to say that I hadn't heard anything". Aarons also revealed that he had no interest in playing for anyone other than his home nation, commenting: "my full focus is definitely on England".

On 14 June 2023, Aarons was included in the England squad for the 2023 UEFA European Under-21 Championship. He started in the final as England beat Spain 1–0 to win the tournament.

== Personal life ==
Aarons is of Jamaican descent. He is the cousin of football player Rolando Aarons, who has played for clubs like Newcastle United and Huddersfield Town, and has represented Jamaica internationally.

== Career statistics ==
As of match played 26 April 2026

Appearances and goals by club, season and competition
Club	Season	League			National cup (Note: Includes FA Cup, Copa del Rey, Scottish Cup)		League cup (Note: Includes EFL Cup, Scottish League Cup)		Europe		Total	
Club	Season	Division	Apps	Goals	Apps	Goals	Apps	Goals	Apps	Goals	Apps	Goals
Norwich City	2018–19	Championship	41	2	0	0	2	1	—		43	3
Norwich City	2019–20	Premier League	36	0	3	0	1	0	—		40	0
Norwich City	2020–21	Championship	45	2	2	0	0	0	—		47	2
Norwich City	2021–22	Premier League	34	0	1	0	0	0	—		35	0
Norwich City	2022–23	Championship	45	1	1	0	2	0	—		48	1
Norwich City	Total		201	5	7	0	5	1	—		213	6
Bournemouth	2023–24	Premier League	20	0	1	0	2	0	—		23	0
Bournemouth	2024–25	Premier League	3	0	1	0	0	0	—		4	0
Bournemouth	Total		23	0	2	0	2	0	—		27	0
Valencia (loan)	2024–25	La Liga	4	0	1	0	—		—		5	0
Rangers (loan)	2025–26	Scottish Premiership	19	1	1	0	2	0	11 (Note: Five appearances in UEFA Champions League, six appearances in UEFA Europa League)	0	33	1
Career total			247	6	11	0	9	1	11	0	278	7

== Honours ==
Norwich City

- EFL Championship: 2018–19, 2020–21

England U21

- UEFA European Under-21 Championship: 2023

Individual

- EFL Young Player of the Year: 2018–19
- EFL Championship Team of the Season: 2018–19, 2020–21
- PFA Team of the Year: 2018–19 Championship, 2020–21 Championship
- EFL Young Player of the Month: December 2020
