= 2022–23 Norwich City F.C. season =

Norwich City
2022–23 season
- Owner: Delia Smith; Michael Wynn-Jones
- Head coach: Dean Smith (until 27 December); David Wagner (from 6 January)
- Stadium: Carrow Road
- Championship: 13th
- FA Cup: Third round
- EFL Cup: Second round
- Top goalscorer: League: Josh Sargent (13); All: Josh Sargent (13)
- Highest home attendance: 26,673 vs Middlesbrough (12 November 2022, Championship)
- Lowest home attendance: 18,971 vs Birmingham City (9 August 2022, EFL Cup)
Home colours	Away colours	Third colours

The 2022–23 season was the 121st season in the existence of Norwich City Football Club and the club's first season back in the Championship since the 2020–21 season, following their relegation from the Premier League the previous season. In addition to the league, they also competed in the season's editions of the FA Cup and EFL Cup.

== Transfers ==
=== In ===
Date	Pos	Player	Transferred from	Fee	Ref
1 July 2022	CM	(England) Marcel McIntosh	(England) Forest Green Rovers	Free Transfer	
1 July 2022	RB	(England) Benjamin Watt	(England) Oxford United	Free Transfer	
15 July 2022	AM	(Brazil) Gabriel Sara	(Brazil) São Paulo	Undisclosed	
2 August 2022	CM	(Chile) Marcelino Núñez	(Chile) Universidad Católica	Undisclosed	

=== Out ===
Date	Pos	Player	Transferred to	Fee	Ref
10 June 2022 (Note: The transfer was announced on 9 June, and became official on 10 June when the transfer window opened)	CB	(Belgium) Rocky Bushiri	(Scotland) Hibernian	Undisclosed	
10 June 2022 (Note: The transfer was announced on 4 June, and became official on 10 June when the transfer window opened)	AM	(England) Matthew Dennis	(England) Milton Keynes Dons	Undisclosed	
21 June 2022	CM	(England) Daniel Adshead	(England) Cheltenham Town	Undisclosed	
30 June 2022	RB	(England) Solomon Alidor-Hamilton	Unattached	Released	
30 June 2022	LB	(England) Freddie Allen	(England) Doncaster Rovers	Free transfer	
30 June 2022	CF	(Switzerland) Josip Drmić	(Croatia) Dinamo Zagreb	Released	
30 June 2022	RB	(Republic of Ireland) Josh Giurgi	(Republic of Ireland) Shelbourne	Released	
30 June 2022	DM	(England) Nelson Khumbeni	(England) Bolton Wanderers	Released	
30 June 2022	CM	(Scotland) Reece McAlear	(England) Tranmere Rovers	Released	
30 June 2022	RB	(England) Ola Okeowo	Unattached	Released	
30 June 2022	GK	(England) Aston Oxborough	(Scotland) Motherwell	Released	
30 June 2022	CM	(Germany) Lukas Rupp	Unattached	Released	
6 July 2022	CB	(England) Akin Famewo	(England) Sheffield Wednesday	Undisclosed	
20 July 2022	CB	(Germany) Christoph Zimmermann	(Germany) Darmstadt 98	Undisclosed	
23 July 2022	CM	(France) Pierre Lees-Melou	(France) Stade Brestois	Undisclosed	
19 August 2022	RB	(England) Ayyuba Jambang	(England) Reading	Free Transfer	
25 August 2022	CF	(United States) Sebastian Soto	Austria Klagenfurt	Undisclosed	
2 January 2023	LB	(England) Saxon Earley	(England) Plymouth Argyle	Undisclosed	
16 January 2023	LW	(England) Oscar Thorn	(England) Colchester United	Undisclosed	
23 January 2023	LM	(England) Todd Cantwell	(Scotland) Rangers	Undisclosed	
23 January 2023	CF	(Belgium) Tyrese Omotoye	(England) Forest Green Rovers	Undisclosed	
25 January 2023	CF	(England) Jordan Hugill	(England) Rotherham United	Undisclosed	

=== Loans in ===
Date	Pos	Player	Loaned from	On loan until	Ref
10 June 2022 (Note: The loan agreement was announced on 7 June, and became official on 10 June once the transfer window opened)	DM	(England) Isaac Hayden	(England) Newcastle United	30 June 2023	
5 August 2022	AM	(England) Aaron Ramsey	(England) Aston Villa	3 January 2023 (Note: On 3 January, Ramsey's loan was cut short due to a knee injury)	
31 January 2023	RW	(Brazil) Marquinhos	(England) Arsenal	30 June 2023	

=== Loans out ===
Date	Pos	Player	Loaned to	On loan until	Ref
6 July 2022	LW	(Poland) Przemysław Płacheta	(England) Birmingham City	3 January 2023 (Note: On 3 January, Płacheta's loan at Birmingham was cut short due to a left tibial stress fracture injury)	
11 July 2022	AM	(Scotland) Flynn Clarke	(England) Walsall	1 September 2022 (Note: On 1 September, Clarke was recalled from his loan spell at Walsall.)	
11 July 2022	LB	(England) Saxon Earley	(England) Stevenage	2 January 2023 (Note: On 2 January, Earley's loan at Stevenage was cut short to allow him to complete a permanent move to Plymouth Argyle)	
14 July 2022	RB	(England) Bali Mumba	(England) Plymouth Argyle	30 June 2023	
21 July 2022	GK	(Scotland) Jon McCracken	(Republic of Ireland) Bohemians	31 December 2022	
22 July 2022	LW	(Greece) Christos Tzolis	(Netherlands) FC Twente	30 January 2023 (Note: On 30 January, Tzolis was recalled from his loan spell at FC Twente)	
31 August 2022	RW	(England) Josh Martin	(England) Barnsley	30 June 2023	
8 September 2022	LW	(Kosovo) Milot Rashica	(Turkey) Galatasaray	30 June 2023	
16 September 2022	GK	(England) Joe Rose	(England) Cheshunt	16 October 2022	
16 September 2022	GK	(Republic of Ireland) Sam Blair	(England) Wroxham	16 October 2022	
19 October 2022	GK	(Republic of Ireland) Sam Blair	(England) King's Lynn Town	1 January 2023	
29 October 2022	GK	(Northern Ireland) Dylan Berry	(England) St Albans City	30 June 2023	
1 November 2022	GK	(England) David Aziaya	(England) Faversham Town	1 January 2023	
22 November 2022	GK	(Scotland) Archie Mair	(England) Dartford	22 December 2022	
14 December 2022	GK	(Wales) Daniel Barden	(England) Maidstone United	14 January 2023	
13 January 2023	GK	(Scotland) Archie Mair	(England) Notts County	30 June 2023	
13 January 2023	CB	(United States) Jonathan Tomkinson	(England) Stevenage	30 June 2023	
16 January 2023	LW	(Republic of Ireland) Tony Springett	(England) Derby County	30 June 2023	
31 January 2023	CF	(Scotland) Tom Dickson-Peters	(England) Grimsby Town	30 June 2023	
31 January 2023	LW	(Luxembourg) Danel Sinani	(England) Wigan Athletic	30 June 2023	
10 March 2023	GK	(Scotland) Jon McCracken	(England) Stevenage	1 April 2023	

== Pre-season and friendlies ==
The Canaries announced they would travel to Scotland for back-to-back pre-season friendlies against Celtic and Hibernian. On 30 May, Norwich City confirmed further matches for their pre-season schedule, which includes a training camp in Bavaria. Two more matches were added to the calendar against Jahn Regensburg and Olympique de Marseille.

Win Draw Loss Fixtures

1 July 2022 Friendly	Dereham Town	0–4	Norwich City	Dereham
19:00 BST		Report	Hugill 7', 45'; Dickson-Peters 48'; Dowell 88' (pen.)	Stadium: Aldiss Park

9 July 2022 Friendly	Jahn Regensburg	2–2	Norwich City	Grassau, Germany
14:00 CEST	Albers 1'; Mees 29'	Report	Cantwell 18'; Rowe 64'	Stadium: ASV Grassau Sportspark; Attendance: 0 (behind-closed-doors)

12 July 2022 Friendly	King's Lynn Town	0–2	Norwich City	King's Lynn
19:30 BST		Report	Pukki 36'; Tzolis 44'	Stadium: The Walks

16 July 2022 Friendly	Olympique de Marseille	0–3	Norwich City	Fos-sur-Mer, France
18:00 CEST		Report	Sørensen 9'; Hugill 60', 86'	Stadium: Stade Parsemain

19 July 2022 Friendly	Cambridge United	1–3	Norwich City	Cambridge
20:00 BST	Smith 43'	Report	Gibbs 59'; Hugill 68', 78'	Stadium: Abbey Stadium; Referee: Neil Hair

23 July 2022 Friendly	Celtic	2–0	Norwich City	Parkhead, Scotland
15:00 BST	Maeda 36'; Turnbull 67'	Report		Stadium: Celtic Park

24 July 2022 Friendly	Hibernian	1–0	Norwich City	Leith, Scotland
14:00 BST	Melkersen 39'	Report		Stadium: Easter Road

== Competitions ==
=== Overall record ===
Competition	First match	Last match	Starting round	Final position	Record							
Competition	First match	Last match	Starting round	Final position	Pld	W	D	L	GF	GA	GD	Win %
Championship	30 July 2022	8 May 2023	Matchday 1	13th	46	17	11	18	57	54	+3	36.96
FA Cup	8 January 2023		Third round	Third round	1	0	0	1	0	1	−1	0.00
EFL Cup	9 August 2022	23 August 2022	First round	Second round	2	0	2	0	4	4	+0	0.00
Total					49	17	13	19	61	59	+2	34.69

Source: Soccerway

=== Championship ===
==== League table ====
Pos	Team	Pld	W	D	L	GF	GA	GD	Pts
10	Swansea City	46	18	12	16	68	64	+4	66
11	Watford	46	16	15	15	56	53	+3	63
12	Preston North End	46	17	12	17	45	59	−14	63
13	Norwich City	46	17	11	18	57	54	+3	62
14	Bristol City	46	15	14	17	55	56	−1	59
15	Hull City	46	14	16	16	51	61	−10	58
16	Stoke City	46	14	11	21	55	54	+1	53

Source: EFL Official Website
Rules for classification: 1) Points; 2) Goal difference; 3) Number of goals scored; 4) Head-to-head results; 5) Wins; 6) Away goals; 7) Penalty points (sec 9.5); 8) 12-point sending off offences

==== Results summary ====
Overall								Home						Away					
Pld	W	D	L	GF	GA	GD	Pts	W	D	L	GF	GA	GD	W	D	L	GF	GA	GD
46	17	11	18	57	54	+3	62	8	5	10	27	27	0	9	6	8	30	27	+3

==== Results by round ====
Round	1	2	3	4	5	6	7	8	9	10	11	12	13	14	15	16	17	18	19	20	21	22	23	24	25	26	27	28	29	30	31	32	33	34	35	36	37	38	39	40	41	42	43	44	45	46
Ground	A	H	A	H	H	A	A	H	H	H	A	A	H	A	H	A	A	H	H	A	H	A	H	A	H	H	A	A	H	A	H	A	H	H	A	H	A	A	H	A	H	A	A	H	A	H
Result	L	D	L	W	W	W	W	W	W	D	W	D	L	L	L	D	L	W	D	W	L	W	L	L	D	L	W	W	L	L	W	D	W	W	W	L	D	D	L	W	D	L	D	L	L	L
Position	19	21	24	17	8	4	2	2	2	2	2	2	2	3	6	7	7	5	5	4	5	4	5	5	7	11	7	5	10	10	9	9	9	7	6	7	7	7	7	7	8	10	10	11	12	13

Source: [Soccerway]
A = Away; H = Home; W = Win; D = Draw; L = Loss; P = Postponed

==== Matches ====
Win Draw Loss Fixtures

On 23 June, the league fixtures were announced.

30 July 2022 1	Cardiff City	1–0	Norwich City	Leckwith
15:00 BST	Kipré (yellow card) 44'; Sawyers 49'; O'Dowda (yellow card) 54'; Ralls (yellow card) 69'; Rinomhota (yellow card) 69'; Ng (yellow card) 69' (yellow-red card) 73'	Report	Hanley (yellow card) 68' (yellow-red card) 85'	Stadium: Cardiff City Stadium; Attendance: 19,969; Referee: Tim Robinson

6 August 2022 2	Norwich City	1–1	Wigan Athletic	Norwich
12:30 BST	Aarons 61'	Report	McClean 29'; Power (yellow card) 45+1'; Aasgaard (yellow card) 90+2'; Nyambe (yellow card) 90+7'; Amos (yellow card) 90+11'	Stadium: Carrow Road; Attendance: 25,595; Referee: Matt Donohue

13 August 2022 3	Hull City	2–1	Norwich City	Kingston upon Hull
15:00 BST	Estupiñán 43', 62'; Sayyadmanesh (yellow card) 90+6'	Report	Omobamidele (yellow card) 23'; Núñez 72'	Stadium: MKM Stadium; Attendance: 17,028; Referee: James Linington

16 August 2022 4	Norwich City	2–1	Huddersfield Town	Norwich
19:45 BST	Sargent 6'; Sinani 16'; Dowell (yellow card) 59'	Report	Lees (red card) 48'; Jones 81'	Stadium: Carrow Road; Attendance: 25,369; Referee: Josh Smith

19 August 2022 5	Norwich City	2–0	Millwall	Norwich
20:00 BST	Sargent 50', 75'; Gibbs (yellow card) 84'; Krul (yellow card) 90+2'	Report	Saville (yellow card) 19'; Honeyman (yellow card) 66'	Stadium: Carrow Road; Attendance: 26,214; Referee: Robert Jones

27 August 2022 6	Sunderland	0–1	Norwich City	Sunderland
12:30 BST	Cirkin (yellow card) 25'; O'Nien (yellow card) 35'	Report	Sargent 76', (yellow card) 90+1'; Krul (yellow card) 90+2'	Stadium: Stadium of Light; Attendance: 36,440; Referee: Tim Robinson

30 August 2022 7	Birmingham City	1–2	Norwich City	Birmingham
19:45 BST	Williams (yellow card) 9'; Hogan 50'; Bacuna (yellow card) 61'; Deeney (yellow card) 71'; Trusty (yellow card) 71'	Report	Dowell (yellow card) 11'; Omobamidele 63', (yellow card) 71'; Aarons (yellow card) 80'; Hernández 90+3', (yellow card) 90+4'	Stadium: St Andrew's; Attendance: 16,156; Referee: Keith Stroud

3 September 2022 8	Norwich City	3–0	Coventry City	Norwich
15:00 BST	Pukki 14'; Byram (yellow card) 45'; Sargent 45+1'; Dowell 81'	Report		Stadium: Carrow Road; Attendance: 26,487; Referee: Gavin Ward

14 September 2022 9	Norwich City	3–2	Bristol City	Norwich
19:45 BST	Pukki 11', 23'; Sargent 65'	Report	Conway 44'; Semenyo 77'	Stadium: Carrow Road; Attendance: 25,287; Referee: David Webb

17 September 2022 10	Norwich City	1–1	West Bromwich Albion	Norwich
15:00 BST	Aarons (yellow card) 58'; Byram 68'	Report	O'Shea 9'; Furlong (yellow card) 85'	Stadium: Carrow Road; Attendance: 26,303; Referee: Thomas Bramall

1 October 2022 11	Blackpool	0–1	Norwich City	Blackpool
15:00 BST	Gabriel (yellow card) 10'; Dougall (yellow card) 39'; Ekpiteta (yellow card) 90+2'	Report	Pukki 21'	Stadium: Bloomfield Road; Attendance: 11,594; Referee: David Coote

4 October 2022 12	Reading	1–1	Norwich City	Reading
20:00 BST	Hutchinson (yellow card) 11'; Ince (yellow card) 24'; Hendrick 60'; Hoilett (yellow card) 86'	Report	Hanley 50'; Omobamidele (yellow card) 83'	Stadium: Madejski Stadium; Attendance: 11,978; Referee: Darren Bond

8 October 2022 13	Norwich City	2–3	Preston North End	Norwich
15:00 BST	Sargent 2'; Byram (yellow card) 30'; Sara 76'	Report	Riis 25', 51'; Brady (yellow card) 44'; Fernández (yellow card) 55'; Browne (yellow card) 59'; Storey (yellow card) 64'; Parrott 80'; Johnson (yellow card) 90+7'	Stadium: Carrow Road; Attendance: 26,062; Referee: Oliver Langford

15 October 2022 14	Watford	2–1	Norwich City	Watford
19:45 BST	Louza 18'; Davis 31'; Kamara (yellow card) 74'	Report	Aarons (yellow card) 43'; Sargent 45'	Stadium: Vicarage Road; Attendance: 19,400; Referee: Darren England

18 October 2022 15	Norwich City	0–1	Luton Town	Norwich
19:45 BST	McLean (red card) 66'; Cantwell (yellow card) 75'	Report	Morris 62'; Potts (yellow card) 75'; Adebayo (yellow card) 80'	Stadium: Carrow Road; Attendance: 25,846; Referee: Oliver Langford

22 October 2022 16	Sheffield United	2–2	Norwich City	Sheffield
15:00 BST	Sharp (yellow card) 57'; Osborn 62'; McBurnie 71'	Report	Pukki 3', 16'; Hayden (yellow card) 45+3'; Cantwell (yellow card) 45+4'; Hanley (yellow card) 53'; Giannoulis (yellow card) 70'; Gibbs (yellow card) 79'	Stadium: Bramall Lane; Attendance: 30,035; Referee: Josh Smith

25 October 2022 17	Burnley	1–0	Norwich City	Burnley
19:45 BST	Rodriguez (yellow card) 38', (goal) 82' (pen.); Tella (yellow card) 58'; Cork (yellow card) 77'	Report	Aarons (yellow card) 21'; Hayden (yellow card) 27'; Hanley (yellow card) 58'	Stadium: Turf Moor; Attendance: 18,931; Referee: Paul Tierney

29 October 2022 18	Norwich City	3–1	Stoke City	Norwich
15:00 BST	Dowell (yellow card) 19'; Ramsey 38', 71'; Hernández (yellow card) 45+2'; McCallum (yellow card) 59'; Hayden (yellow card) 62'; Byram (yellow card) 66'; Sara 77'; Hanley (yellow card) 87'	Report	Gayle (yellow card) 32'; Laurent (yellow card) 82'; Powell 90+2'	Stadium: Carrow Road; Attendance: 26,159; Referee: Keith Stroud

2 November 2022 19	Norwich City	0–0	Queens Park Rangers	Norwich
19:45 GMT	Byram (yellow card) 31'	Report	Iroegbunam (yellow card) 1'; Field (yellow card) 48'; Dykes (yellow card) 75'	Stadium: Carrow Road; Attendance: 25,458; Referee: Andy Davies

5 November 2022 20	Rotherham United	1–2	Norwich City	Rotherham
15:00 GMT	Rathbone 49'; Ogbene (yellow card) 89'	Report	McLean 17'; Ramsey 50'; McCallum (yellow card) 84'; Gibson (yellow card) 90+2'; Hugill (yellow card) 90+6'	Stadium: New York Stadium; Attendance: 10,913; Referee: Dean Whitestone

12 November 2022 21	Norwich City	1–2	Middlesbrough	Norwich
15:00 GMT	Sargent 7'; Hayden (yellow card) 59'	Report	Lenihan (yellow card) 22'; Forss (yellow card) 41'; McGree 64'; Crooks 90+2'	Stadium: Carrow Road; Attendance: 26,673; Referee: Leigh Doughty

10 December 2022 22	Swansea City	0–1	Norwich City	Swansea
15:00 GMT	Naughton (yellow card) 49'; Wood (yellow card) 90+4'	Report	Pukki 1'; Gibson (yellow card) 9'; Hayden (yellow card) 36'; Idah (yellow card) 84'; Giannoulis (yellow card) 86'; McLean (yellow card) 90+1'	Stadium: Swansea.com Stadium; Attendance: 16,362; Referee: Steve Martin

17 December 2022 23	Norwich City	0–2	Blackburn Rovers	Norwich
17:30 GMT	McLean (yellow card) 57'; Hanley (yellow card) 79'; Pukki (yellow card) 90+1'; Gibson (yellow card) 90+5'	Report	Gibson 4' (o.g.); Ayala (yellow card) 28'; Morton (yellow card) 83'; Dolan 86'; Kaminski (yellow card) 90+1'	Stadium: Carrow Road; Attendance: 25,866; Referee: Paul Tierney

26 December 2022 24	Luton Town	2–1	Norwich City	Luton
19:45 GMT	Osho (yellow card) 40' (yellow-red card) 80'; Lockyer (yellow card) 48'; Campbell 61'; Woodrow 89'	Report	Gibbs (yellow card) 26'; Pukki 69'	Stadium: Kenilworth Road; Attendance: 9,831; Referee: Tim Robinson

30 December 2022 25	Norwich City	1–1	Reading	Norwich
19:45 GMT	Hanley (yellow card) 2'; McCallum (yellow card) 31'; Idah 53'; Sara (yellow card) 78'	Report	Holmes (yellow card) 59'; Loum (yellow card) 77'; Carroll 83' (pen.)	Stadium: Carrow Road; Attendance: 26,218; Referee: David Webb

2 January 2023 26	Norwich City	0–1	Watford	Norwich
15:00 GMT	Gibbs (yellow card) 18'; Hanley (yellow card) 45'	Report	Ngakia (yellow card) 4'; Morris (yellow card) 49'; Sierralta (yellow card) 68'; Bayo 86'	Stadium: Carrow Road; Attendance: 26,587; Referee: James Linington

14 January 2023 27	Preston North End	0–4	Norwich City	Preston
15:00 GMT	Cannon (yellow card) 59'; Brady (yellow card) 74'; Lindsay (yellow card) 75'; Ledson (yellow card) 79'	Report	Pukki 13', 69'; Dowell 16', 28'; Sara (yellow card) 44'; Hanley (yellow card) 55'; Giannoulis (yellow card) 61'; Idah (yellow card) 89'	Stadium: Deepdale; Attendance: 11,650; Referee: Steve Martin

21 January 2023 28	Coventry City	2–4	Norwich City	Coventry
12:30 GMT	Allen 20'; Palmer 26'	Report	Rose 6' (o.g.); Hernández 10'; Sargent 18'; Dowell 65'; Aarons (yellow card) 89'	Stadium: Coventry Building Society Arena; Attendance: 19,877; Referee: Joshua Smith

4 February 2023 29	Norwich City	0–3	Burnley	Norwich
12:30 GMT	Giannoulis (yellow card) 12'; Omobamidele (yellow card) 16'; Dowell (yellow card) 42'; Núñez (yellow card) 83'; Idah (yellow card) 86'	Report	Zaroury 8'; Brownhill (yellow card) 29'; Barnes (yellow card) 40'; Roberts (yellow card) 45'; Vitinho 54'; Ekdal 60'	Stadium: Carrow Road; Attendance: 26,536; Referee: Keith Stroud

11 February 2023 30	Bristol City	1–0	Norwich City	Bristol
15:00 GMT	Sykes 24'; Williams (yellow card) 58'	Report	McLean (yellow card) 31'; Aarons (yellow card) 58'; Omobamidele (yellow card) 78'	Stadium: Ashton Gate; Attendance: 23,757; Referee: Chris Kavanagh

14 February 2023 31	Norwich City	3–1	Hull City	Norwich
19:45 GMT	Dowell 18'; Sara 58'; Sargent 89'	Report	Greaves 14'; Ebiowei (yellow card) 76'	Stadium: Carrow Road; Attendance: 25,767; Referee: Dean Whitestone

18 February 2023 32	Wigan Athletic	0–0	Norwich City	Wigan
15:00 GMT	Caulker (yellow card) 90+3'; Darikwa (yellow card) 90+5'	Report	McLean (yellow card) 73'; Aarons (yellow card) 90+5'	Stadium: DW Stadium; Attendance: 11,603; Referee: Geoff Eltringham

21 February 2023 33	Norwich City	3–1	Birmingham City	Norwich
19:45 GMT	McLean (yellow card) 16'; Núñez 27', 36'; Tzolis 90+4'	Report	Chang (yellow card) 5'; Bacuna (yellow card) 45'; Colin 53'	Stadium: Carrow Road; Attendance: 25,657; Referee: Jarred Gillett

25 February 2023 34	Norwich City	2–0	Cardiff City	Norwich
15:00 GMT	Sara 33'; Marquinhos 37'; Núñez (yellow card) 90'	Report	Kipré (yellow card) 83'	Stadium: Carrow Road; Attendance: 25,417; Referee: James Linington

4 March 2023 35	Millwall	2–3	Norwich City	Bermondsey
15:00 GMT	Leonard (yellow card) 12'; Bradshaw 20'; McNamara (yellow card) 67'; Flemming 83'	Report	Hernández (yellow card) 35'; Sørensen 38'; Bradshaw 55' (o.g.); Sara 65'; Gibson (yellow card) 80'; Aarons (yellow card) 88'	Stadium: The Den; Attendance: 18,785; Referee: Graham Scott

12 March 2023 36	Norwich City	0–1	Sunderland	Norwich
12:00 GMT	Pukki (yellow card) 32'; Hernández (yellow card) 50'	Report	Ba 15'; Neil (yellow card) 62'; Hume (yellow card) 64'; Batth (yellow card) 71'; Gooch (yellow card) 85'; Ekwah (yellow card) 90+2'	Stadium: Carrow Road; Attendance: 26,728; Referee: Tim Robinson

15 March 2023 37	Huddersfield Town	1–1	Norwich City	Huddersfield
19:45 GMT	Hanley 65' (o.g.)	Report	Sara 26'; Aarons (yellow card) 53'; Gunn (yellow card) 64'; Marquinhos (red card) 90+2'; McLean (yellow card) 90+5'	Stadium: Kirklees Stadium; Attendance: 18,116; Referee: Keith Stroud

18 March 2023 38	Stoke City	0–0	Norwich City	Stoke-on-Trent
15:00 GMT	Wilmot (yellow card) 17'; Pearson (yellow card) 52'	Report		Stadium: Bet365 Stadium; Attendance: 22,102; Referee: David Webb

1 April 2023 39	Norwich City	0–1	Sheffield United	Norwich
15:00 BST	Aarons (yellow card) 32'; Sara (yellow card) 34'; McLean (yellow card) 90+5'	Report	Baldock (yellow card) 32'; Berge (yellow card) 50'; McAtee 62'; Ndiaye (yellow card) 90+5'	Stadium: Carrow Road; Attendance: 26,801; Referee: Darren Bond

7 April 2023 40	Blackburn Rovers	0–2	Norwich City	Blackburn
15:00 BST	Gallagher (yellow card) 59'	Report	Gibbs 11'; Gibson (yellow card) 34'; Sara 55'; Omobamidele (yellow card) 59'	Stadium: Ewood Park; Attendance: 18,544; Referee: Andre Marriner

10 April 2023 41	Norwich City	0–0	Rotherham United	Norwich
15:00 BST		Report	Coventry (yellow card) 42'	Stadium: Carrow Road; Attendance: 26,269; Referee: Jeremy Simpson

14 April 2023 42	Middlesbrough	5–1	Norwich City	Middlesbrough
20:00 BST	Ramsey 7'; Hackney 41'; Archer 43', 45+6'; Akpom 49'	Report	Sargent 45'; Sørensen (yellow card) 70'	Stadium: Riverside Stadium; Attendance: 26,429; Referee: Josh Smith

19 April 2023 43	Queens Park Rangers	1–1	Norwich City	Shepherd's Bush
19:45 BST	Dykes 9', (yellow card) 30'; Dunne (yellow card) 41'; Chair (yellow card) 55'; Martin (yellow card) 76'; Amos (yellow card) 90+3'	Report	Omobamidele (yellow card) 19'; Hernández (yellow card) 22'; Idah 46'	Stadium: Loftus Road; Attendance: 14,132; Referee: Keith Stroud

22 April 2023 44	Norwich City	0–3	Swansea City	Norwich
15:00 BST	McCallum (red card) 42'; Gibbs (yellow card) 81'	Report	Latibeaudiere 23'; Cullen 39'; Ntcham 64'; Grimes (yellow card) 73'	Stadium: Carrow Road; Attendance: 26,135; Referee: David Webb

29 April 2023 45	West Bromwich Albion	2–1	Norwich City	West Bromwich
17:30 BST	Townsend 45+1'; Wallace 56'	Report	Byram (yellow card) 13'; Sargent 41'; Gibbs (yellow card) 53'	Stadium: The Hawthorns; Attendance: 24,638; Referee: Bobby Madley

8 May 2023 46	Norwich City	0–1	Blackpool	Norwich
15:00 BST	Hernández (yellow card) 73'	Report	Rogers 15'	Stadium: Carrow Road; Attendance: 26,147; Referee: James Bell

=== FA Cup ===
The Canaries were drawn at home to Blackburn Rovers in the third round.

Win Draw Loss Fixtures

8 January 2023 Third round	Norwich City	0–1	Blackburn Rovers	Norwich
14:00 GMT	Aarons (yellow card) 22'; Hugill (yellow card) 73'	Report	Vale 31'; Carter (yellow card) 53'	Stadium: Carrow Road; Attendance: 20,472; Referee: Gavin Ward

=== EFL Cup ===
Win Draw Loss Fixtures

Norwich City were drawn at home to Birmingham City in the first round and to AFC Bournemouth in the second round.

9 August 2022 First round	Norwich City	2–2 (4–2 p)	Birmingham City	Norwich
19:45 BST	Hugill (yellow card) 19'; Sinani 45+1'; Sørensen 45+3'	Report	Jutkiewicz (yellow card) 11'; Leko 53'; Colin (yellow card) 71'; Tomkinson 77' (o.g.)	Stadium: Carrow Road; Attendance: 18,971; Referee: Sam Barrott
	Penalties
	McLean (penalty missed); Gibbs (penalty scored); Sinani (penalty scored); Núñez (penalty scored); Sargent (penalty scored)		(penalty missed) Cosgrove; (penalty scored) Graham; (penalty missed) Leko; (penalty scored) James

23 August 2022 Second round	Norwich City	2–2 (3–5 p)	Bournemouth	Norwich
19:45 BST	Hugill 22'; Gibbs (yellow card) 52'; Idah 83'	Report	Greenwood (yellow card) 8'; Marcondes 43'; Genesini 90+2'	Stadium: Carrow Road; Attendance: 20,647; Referee: Michael Salisbury
	Penalties
	Pukki (penalty scored); Cantwell (penalty missed); Gibbs (penalty scored); Idah (penalty scored)		(penalty scored) Marcondes; (penalty scored) Cook; (penalty scored) Anthony; (penalty scored) Saydee; (penalty scored) Christie

== Squad statistics ==
=== Appearances ===
- Italics indicate a loaned player

No.	Pos	Nat	Player	Total		Championship		FA Cup		EFL Cup	
No.	Pos	Nat	Player	Apps	Goals	Apps	Goals	Apps	Goals	Apps	Goals
1	GK	(Netherlands)	Tim Krul	17	0	16	0	1	0	0	0
2	DF	(England)	Max Aarons	48	1	44+1	1	1	0	0+2	0
3	DF	(England)	Sam Byram	16	1	11+4	1	0	0	1	0
4	DF	(Republic of Ireland)	Andrew Omobamidele	35	1	27+7	1	1	0	0	0
5	DF	(Scotland)	Grant Hanley	41	1	39	1	1	0	1	0
6	DF	(England)	Ben Gibson	23	0	19+3	0	0	0	1	0
8	MF	(England)	Isaac Hayden	14	0	9+5	0	0	0	0	0
10	MF	(England)	Kieran Dowell	25	5	14+9	5	0+1	0	1	0
11	FW	(Republic of Ireland)	Adam Idah	27	3	11+14	2	1	0	0+1	1
13	FW	(Brazil)	Marquinhos	11	1	8+3	1	0	0	0	0
15	DF	(England)	Sam McCallum	25	0	12+11	0	0+1	0	1	0
17	MF	(Brazil)	Gabriel Sara	43	7	31+9	7	1	0	2	0
18	MF	(Greece)	Christos Tzolis	13	1	3+10	1	0	0	0	0
19	MF	(Denmark)	Jacob Sørensen	20	2	14+5	1	0	0	1	1
20	MF	(Poland)	Przemysław Płacheta	0	0	0	0	0	0	0	0
22	FW	(Finland)	Teemu Pukki	43	10	33+8	10	1	0	0+1	0
23	MF	(Scotland)	Kenny McLean	38	1	34+1	1	1	0	2	0
24	FW	(United States)	Josh Sargent	41	13	37+3	13	0	0	0+1	0
25	MF	(Cuba)	Onel Hernández	42	2	19+20	2	1	0	1+1	0
26	MF	(Chile)	Marcelino Núñez	38	3	23+13	3	1	0	0+1	0
27	FW	(England)	Jonathan Rowe	3	0	0+3	0	0	0	0	0
28	GK	(Scotland)	Angus Gunn	32	0	30	0	0	0	2	0
30	DF	(Greece)	Dimitris Giannoulis	27	0	20+6	0	1	0	0	0
33	GK	(Northern Ireland)	Michael McGovern	0	0	0	0	0	0	0	0
37	GK	(Wales)	Daniel Barden	0	0	0	0	0	0	0	0
44	MF	(England)	Bradley Hills	0	0	0	0	0	0	0	0
46	MF	(England)	Liam Gibbs	37	1	18+16	1	0+1	0	1+1	0
47	MF	(England)	Abu Kamara	3	0	0+3	0	0	0	0	0
Out on loan:
7	MF	(Kosovo)	Milot Rashica	5	0	3+1	0	0	0	1	0
21	MF	(Luxembourg)	Danel Sinani	18	2	7+9	1	0+1	0	1	1
42	MF	(Republic of Ireland)	Tony Springett	2	0	0+1	0	0	0	1	0
45	DF	(United States)	Jonathan Tomkinson	3	0	1	0	0	0	2	0
—	DF	(England)	Bali Mumba	0	0	0	0	0	0	0	0
No longer at the club:
9	FW	(England)	Jordan Hugill	10	1	0+7	0	0+1	0	2	1
14	MF	(England)	Todd Cantwell	19	0	9+9	0	0	0	1	0
20	MF	(England)	Aaron Ramsey	20	3	13+5	3	0	0	1+1	0
—	DF	(Germany)	Christoph Zimmermann	0	0	0	0	0	0	0	0
—	MF	(France)	Pierre Lees-Melou	0	0	0	0	0	0	0	0
—	DF	(England)	Akin Famewo	0	0	0	0	0	0	0	0

=== Goalscorers ===
Rnk	No	Pos	Nat	Name	Championship	FA Cup	EFL Cup	Total
1	24	FW	(United States)	Josh Sargent	13	0	0	13
2	22	FW	(Finland)	Teemu Pukki	10	0	0	10
3	17	MF	(Brazil)	Gabriel Sara	7	0	0	7
4	10	MF	(England)	Kieran Dowell	5	0	0	5
5	20	MF	(England)	Aaron Ramsey	3	0	0	3
5	26	MF	(Chile)	Marcelino Núñez	3	0	0	3
5	11	FW	(Republic of Ireland)	Adam Idah	2	0	1	3
8	25	MF	(Cuba)	Onel Hernández	2	0	0	2
8	21	MF	(Luxembourg)	Danel Sinani	1	0	1	2
8	19	MF	(Denmark)	Jacob Sørensen	1	0	1	2
11	2	DF	(England)	Max Aarons	1	0	0	1
11	4	DF	(Republic of Ireland)	Andrew Omobamidele	1	0	0	1
11	3	DF	(England)	Sam Byram	1	0	0	1
11	5	DF	(Scotland)	Grant Hanley	1	0	0	1
11	23	MF	(Scotland)	Kenny McLean	1	0	0	1
11	18	MF	(Greece)	Christos Tzolis	1	0	0	1
11	13	FW	(Brazil)	Marquinhos	1	0	0	1
11	46	MF	(England)	Liam Gibbs	1	0	0	1
11	9	FW	(England)	Jordan Hugill	0	0	1	1
Own goals					2	0	0	2
Total					57	0	4	61

== See also ==
- 2022–23 in English football
- List of Norwich City F.C. seasons
