= Grant Hanley =

Scottish footballer (born 1991)

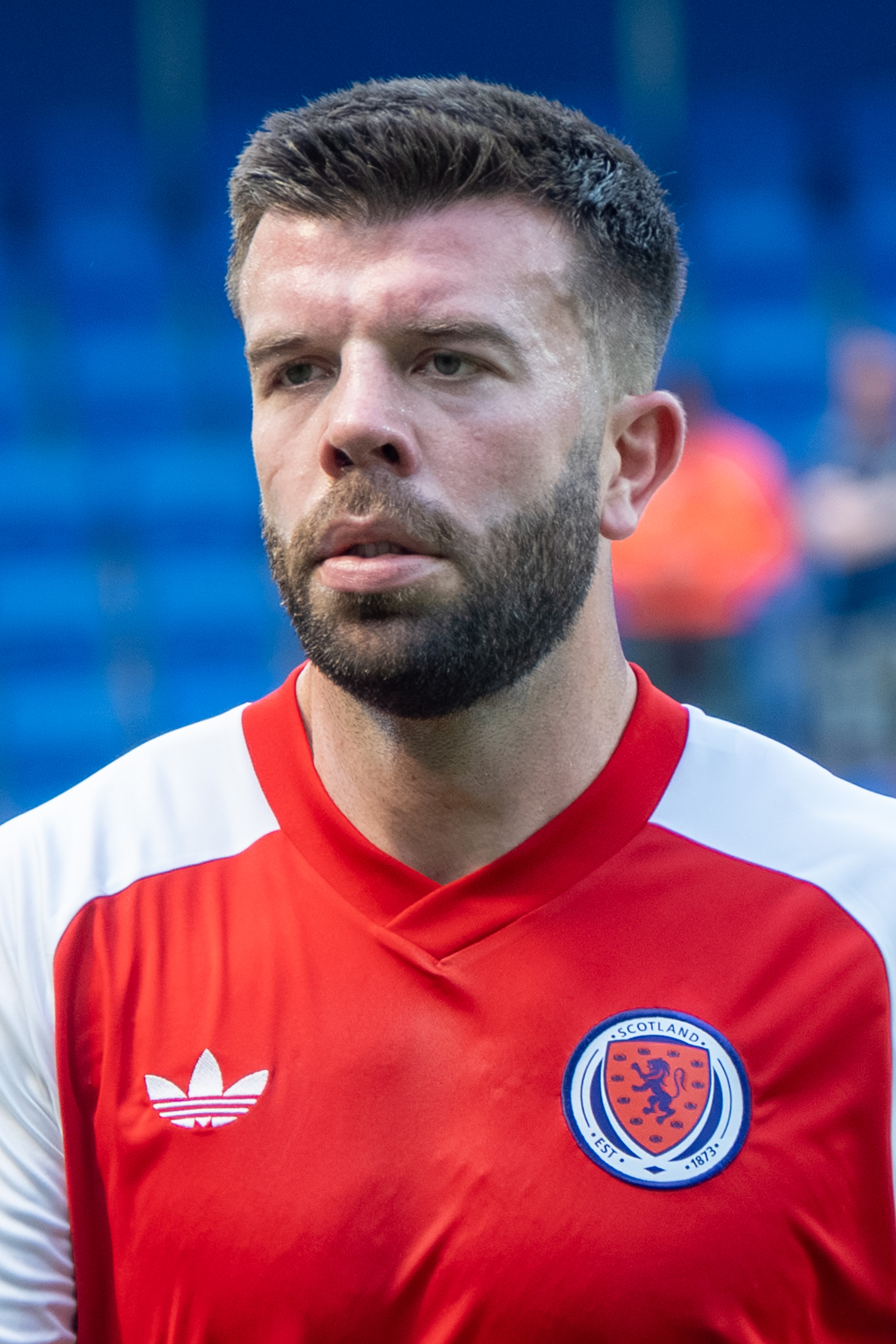
- Hanley in 2026

Personal information
- Full name: Grant Campbell Hanley
- Date of birth: 20 November 1991 (age 35)
- Place of birth: Dumfries, Scotland
- Height: 6 ft 2 in (1.87 m)
- Position: Centre-back

Team information
- Current team: Hibernian
- Number: 4

Youth career
- Queen of the South
- 2004–2006: Crewe Alexandra
- 2006–2008: Rangers
- 2008–2010: Blackburn Rovers

Senior career*
Years	Team	Apps	(Gls)
2010–2016	Blackburn Rovers	183	(8)
2016–2017	Newcastle United	10	(1)
2017–2025	Norwich City	181	(5)
2025	Birmingham City	14	(0)
2025–	Hibernian	24	(0)

International career^{‡}
2010–2011	Scotland U19	7	(0)
2010	Scotland U21	1	(0)
2011–	Scotland	70	(2)
- * Club domestic league appearances and goals as of 23:54, 20 May 2026 (UTC) ‡ National team caps and goals as of 00:06, 20 June 2026 (UTC)

Grant Campbell Hanley (born 20 November 1991) is a Scottish professional footballer who plays as a centre-back for Scottish Premiership club Hibernian and the Scotland national team.

Across his club career, Hanley has previously played for Blackburn Rovers, Newcastle United, Norwich City, and Birmingham City. He has won the EFL Championship three times, once with Newcastle and twice with Norwich. He was named in the 2020–21 EFL Championship Team of the Season.

He made his full international debut for Scotland in 2011, and has won 70 caps in his career. He also appeared at the Euro 2020 and Euro 2024 championships and the 2026 FIFA World Cup.

== Early years ==
Hanley was born in Dumfries. He was involved at youth level with local club Queen of the South, Crewe Alexandra and Rangers before he joined Blackburn Rovers as a 16-year-old in 2008.

== Club career ==
=== Blackburn Rovers ===
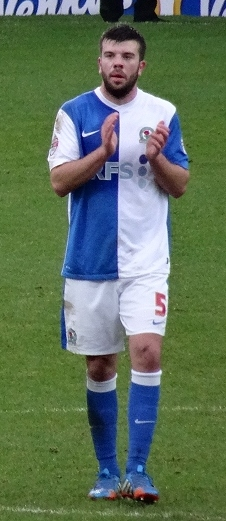
Hanley playing for Blackburn Rovers in 2014.

At Rovers, Hanley was captain of the under-18 team. He made his Premier League debut for Rovers in a 1–0 win at Aston Villa on 9 May 2010. Hanley committed his future when he signed a new five-year deal with Blackburn on 21 July 2010.

Hanley made his first Premier League appearance of season 2010–11 as a 67th-minute substitute in a 1–1 draw at home to West Ham United. He made his FA Cup debut on 8 January 2011, against Queens Park Rangers in a 1–0 victory at Ewood Park. On 5 March 2011, Hanley scored his first goal for Rovers in a 3–2 defeat against Fulham at Craven Cottage. That was the last of his nine Blackburn first team appearances that season although he was to make his international debut at the end of the season. On 31 December 2011, Hanley started and scored the winning goal in a 3–2 win against local rivals Manchester United at Old Trafford. This win lifted Blackburn off the bottom of the table. On 14 April 2012, in a Premier League fixture against Swansea City at the Liberty Stadium, he suffered an ankle ligament injury. Hanley made 28 appearances and scored one goal in all competitions for Rovers, but the club was relegated into the Championship.

In the beginning of the 2012–13 season, Hanley maintained his first team spot in defense and formed a partnership with teammate Scott Dann. At the end of the season, he signed a new five-year contract with the club.

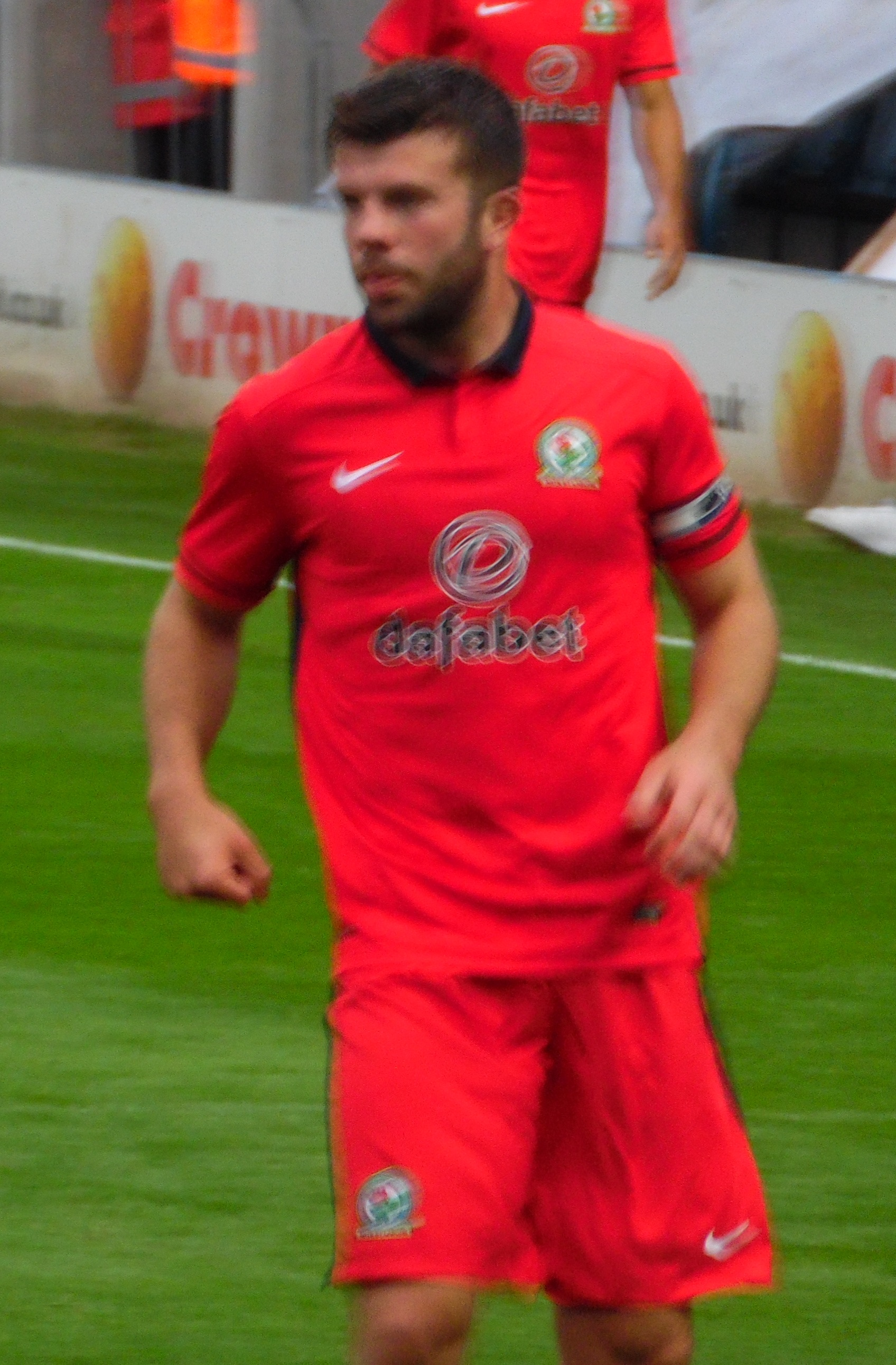
Hanley as a Blackburn Rovers captain in 2015.

After Dann left for Crystal Palace in January 2014, Hanley was appointed as the new captain of the club.

=== Newcastle United ===
On 21 July 2016, Hanley signed for newly relegated Championship club Newcastle United on a five-year contract for an undisclosed fee. He was handed the number 5 shirt, previously worn by Georginio Wijnaldum. He scored his first goal for the club in the 79th minute in a 6–0 win versus Queens Park Rangers at Loftus Road.

=== Norwich City ===
==== 2017–18 ====
On 30 August 2017, Hanley joined Norwich City on a four-year deal for an undisclosed fee. He made his debut on 9 September 2017, coming on as a substitute in a 1–0 win over Birmingham City at Carrow Road. Although he had been something of an emergency buy, with Norwich having started the season with a number of injuries and playing inexperienced centre-backs, Hanley soon became a regular in the team, often being deployed as one of three centre halves alongside Timm Klose and Christoph Zimmermann. He ultimately made 32 league appearances for Norwich during the 2017–18 season, plus two in the FA Cup. One of his most memorable contributions came in the derby game against Ipswich Town on 18 February. Ipswich had gone 1–0 up in the 89th minute and seemed set for a first win over Norwich in nine years. However, deep into added time, Hanley chased a ball to the byline and crossed it back into the goal area, allowing Klose to head it home for an equaliser. The following month, on 17 March, Hanley scored his first goal for Norwich, the second in a 3–2 win over Reading.

==== 2018–19 ====
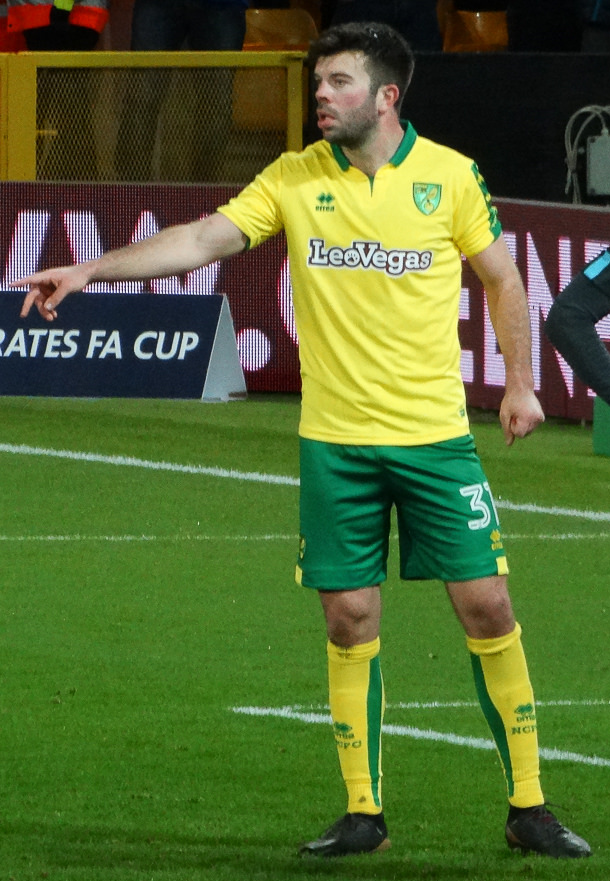
Hanley playing for Norwich City in 2018.

At the beginning of the 2018–19 season, with Russell Martin leaving the club, Hanley was appointed Norwich's new club captain ahead of Ivo Pinto, who had deputised for Martin for much of the previous season. He played in Norwich's opening six league games, getting his second goal for the club in a 4–3 defeat against West Bromwich Albion; however, he was then injured in training. During his absence, Klose and Zimmermann established themselves at centre-back, with Ben Godfrey also becoming a regular choice, and Hanley was restricted to a few appearances as substitute on his return. When he finally started a game, an FA Cup tie against Portsmouth, he was sent off in the first fifteen minutes for a professional foul on Ronan Curtis and Norwich went on to lose 1–0. Despite his lack of game time, Hanley remained club captain as Norwich gained promotion to the Premier League. In the final game of the season, as Norwich defeated Aston Villa 2–1, winning the Championship title, Hanley was brought on as an 89th minute substitute for Onel Hernandez and lifted the Championship trophy alongside team captain Zimmermann.

==== 2019–20 ====
Hanley scored an own goal in a 4–1 defeat against Liverpool on 9 August, which was the first goal of the 2019–20 Premier League season. Despite this, he retained his place for the next two Premier League games until he was once more injured in training. He would later admit he had been injured at the start of the season. Norwich suffered several injuries at centre-back throughout the season, with midfielders Alexander Tettey and Ibrahim Amadou both being deployed as makeshift centre-halves at various points. As a result, despite not being an automatic choice, Hanley made 15 appearances in the season's first 29 league games, as well as helping Norwich reach their first FA Cup quarter-final in over 20 years with a goal in a 2–1 win over Burnley. However, at that stage, the season was suspended because of the COVID-19 pandemic. When it resumed after three months, Hanley was again injured. He played no further part in the season as Norwich finished bottom of the Premier League and were relegated back to the Championship.

==== 2020–21 ====
With the new season starting only two months later, Hanley would again start a season injured. He would make his first appearance of the season on 17 October in Norwich's fifth game, a 2–1 win over Rotherham United. However, from then on, he would not miss a game, making 42 league appearances and 2 FA Cup appearances, as well as contributing a goal in a 2–1 win over Cardiff City. With Godfrey having left the club, Klose absent on loan and Zimmermann absent through injury, Hanley spent most of the season partnered with Ben Gibson, as Norwich won the Football League Championship for the second time in three seasons. He came second behind Emi Buendia in Norwich's Player of the Season vote and, after Norwich finished the season with a 2–2 draw with Barnsley, he lifted the trophy alongside outgoing teammate Tettey, who had been made captain for the game but had handed the armband back to Hanley when he was substituted in the 87th minute.

==== 2021–22 ====
Ahead of Norwich's return to the Premier League, Hanley signed a new four-year contract deal, extending his stay with the club until 30 June 2025. He scored his first goal of the season on 20 November in Norwich's 2–1 win against Southampton, the first game in charge for new manager Dean Smith. Hanley suffered an injury, his second of the season, early on in the game with Manchester United on 11 December, having to be replaced by Jacob Sørensen, with Norwich going on to lose the match 1–0., but returned to the starting line-up in January.

Hanley would make a total of 33 Premier League appearances in the season, usually partnered with Gibson, as well as two appearances in the FA Cup and one in the Carabao Cup. However, it would be another disappointing season for Norwich, as they finished bottom and were once again relegated back to the Championship after only one season. Hanley was one of the few Norwich players to come in for any praise: He again came second in the club's Player of the Season vote, this time losing out to Teemu Pukki.

==== 2022–23 ====
Hanley received a red card in the first league game of the season, a 1–0 defeat at Cardiff City. He scored his first goal of the season in a 1–1 draw at Reading in early October. He would again be a regular for Norwich throughout the season, usually partnered with either Gibson or Andrew Omobamidele, making 39 Championship appearances plus one in each of the cups. However, he would suffer an injury during a 2–0 win over former club Blackburn Rovers, which caused him to miss the last five games of the season as Norwich finished 13th.

==== 2023–24 ====
Hanley's injury continued into the next season and he would not appear until December, when he was brought on as a half-time substitute for Jonathan Rowe in a 1–0 defeat to West Bromwich Albion, following the sending off of Borja Sainz late in the first half. He would subsequently start the New Year's Day game against Southampton, where he was replaced by Adam Idah after 74 minutes. He was picked for Norwich's third round FA Cup tie, a 1–1 draw against Bristol Rovers, but exited the field during injury time with a back problem. He finally played a full game for Norwich in February, a 2–2 draw against Queens Park Rangers.

By now, Norwich had signed both Shane Duffy and Danny Batth as options at centre-half alongside Gibson, and Hanley found his opportunities limited: He started only 6 league games and 2 FA Cup games, the last of them in March. He made a rare appearance as an 82nd minute substitute for Gibson in the last game of the regulation season, a 1–0 defeat against Birmingham. This saw Norwich finish 6th and qualify for the play-offs, which Hanley played no part in as the club were quickly eliminated by Leeds United in the semi-finals.

==== 2024–25 ====
With both Gibson and Batth leaving the club over the summer, Hanley was selected alongside Duffy in defense for Norwich's first game of the 2024–25 season and first under new manager Johannes Hoff Thorup. The game, against newly promoted Oxford United, ended in a 2–0 defeat. Hanley failed to clear the ball for Oxford's first goal and was substituted off after 61 minutes for Sørenson. He was subsequently removed from the starting lineup, with new signings Callum Doyle and José Córdoba both being preferred at centre half ahead of him and Duffy. He would make one further start in a Carabao Cup match against Crystal Palace. His remaining two appearances would be as a second-half substitute in Championship matches, with him making his last appearance for Norwich when he replaced Sørenson in the 75th minute of a match with Cardiff City on 2 November.

=== Birmingham City ===
On 17 January 2025, Hanley left Norwich, joining League One side Birmingham City on a short-term deal until the end of the season. On 20 May 2025, the club announced he would be leaving in June when his contract expired.

=== Hibernian ===
Hanley signed a two-year deal with Scottish Premiership club Hibernian on 5 August 2025. It marked the first time in his professional career that he had played for a Scottish team. On 25 October 2026 he was brought on in the 82nd minute, against league leaders Celtic, to play as a striker, marking Hanley’s debut in that position.

== International career ==
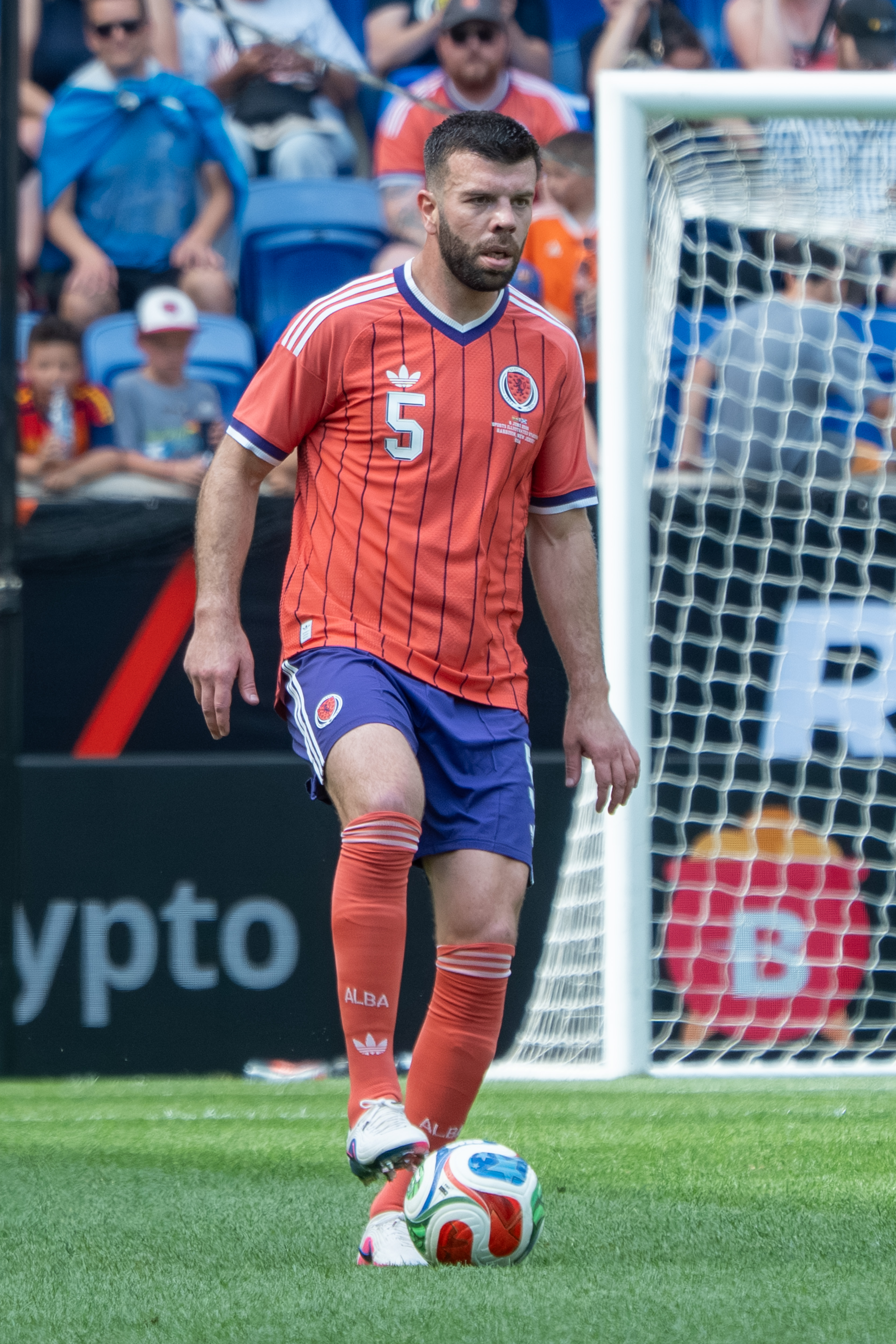
Hanley with Scotland in 2026

Hanley captained Scotland at under-19 level. On 17 November 2010, he played for Scotland under-21s when aged 18 in a 3–1 win against Northern Ireland at Firhill.

On 1 February 2011, Hanley was called up to the senior Scotland squad for the first time ahead of the game against Northern Ireland in the Nations Cup. He made his full international debut as an 84th-minute substitute on 25 May 2011 coming on for Gary Caldwell against Wales in the Nations Cup in Dublin. His first Scotland goal was in his fifth full international when he opened the scoring in a 2014 FIFA World Cup qualifier at home against Wales on 22 March 2013 at Hampden Park.

In May 2021, Hanley was named in Steve Clarke's 26-man squad for UEFA Euro 2020, appearing in all three matches against the Czech Republic, England and Croatia.

On 7 June 2024, Hanley was named in Scotland's squad for the UEFA Euro 2024 finals in Germany, and on the same day made his 50th international appearance in a friendly against Finland. Hanley appeared as a half-time substitute for Ché Adams after Ryan Porteous was sent off in 45th minute during the team's 5–1 loss to hosts Germany in the opening match of the tournament on 15 June, and went on to start in place of the suspended Porteous in both of the other group fixtures against Switzerland and Hungary as Scotland finished bottom of Group A with one point from three matches.

On 19 May 2026, Hanley was selected in the 26-man squad for the 2026 FIFA World Cup. In the second group stage game against Morocco, he and teammate Ryan Christie became only the 11th and 12th players to reach 70 caps for the men's team.

== Career statistics ==
=== Club ===
As of match played 6 September 2026

Appearances and goals by club, season and competition
Club	Season	League			National cup (Note: Includes FA Cup, Scottish Cup)		League cup (Note: Includes Football League/EFL Cup, Scottish League Cup)		Europe		Other		Total	
Club	Season	Division	Apps	Goals	Apps	Goals	Apps	Goals	Apps	Goals	Apps	Goals	Apps	Goals
Blackburn Rovers	2009–10	Premier League	1	0	0	0	0	0	—		—		1	0
Blackburn Rovers	2010–11	Premier League	7	1	2	0	0	0	—		—		9	1
Blackburn Rovers	2011–12	Premier League	23	1	1	0	4	0	—		—		28	1
Blackburn Rovers	2012–13	Championship	39	2	5	1	1	0	—		—		45	3
Blackburn Rovers	2013–14	Championship	38	1	2	0	0	0	—		—		40	1
Blackburn Rovers	2014–15	Championship	31	1	0	0	0	0	—		—		31	1
Blackburn Rovers	2015–16	Championship	44	2	2	0	0	0	—		—		46	2
Blackburn Rovers	Total		183	8	12	1	5	0	—		—		200	9
Newcastle United	2016–17	Championship	10	1	3	0	3	0	—		—		16	1
Newcastle United	2017–18	Premier League	0	0	—		1	0	—		—		1	0
Newcastle United	Total		10	1	3	0	4	0	—		—		17	1
Norwich City	2017–18	Championship	32	1	2	0	—		—		—		34	1
Norwich City	2018–19	Championship	9	1	1	0	0	0	—		—		10	1
Norwich City	2019–20	Premier League	15	0	3	1	0	0	—		—		18	1
Norwich City	2020–21	Championship	42	1	2	0	0	0	—		—		44	1
Norwich City	2021–22	Premier League	33	1	2	0	1	0	—		—		36	1
Norwich City	2022–23	Championship	39	1	1	0	1	0	—		—		41	1
Norwich City	2023–24	Championship	8	0	2	0	0	0	—		0	0	10	0
Norwich City	2024–25	Championship	3	0	—		1	0	—		—		4	0
Norwich City	Total		181	5	13	1	3	0	—		0	0	197	6
Birmingham City	2024–25	League One	14	0	1	0	—		—		2 (Note: Appearances in EFL Trophy)	0	17	0
Hibernian	2025–26	Scottish Premiership	24	0	0	0	2	0	0	0	—		26	0
Hibernian	2026–27	Scottish Premiership	3	0	0	0	0	0	1 (Note: Appearances in UEFA Conference League)	0	—		4	0
Career total			418	14	29	2	14	1	0	0	2	0	462	16

=== International ===
As of match played 19 June 2026

Appearances and goals by national team and year
National team	Year	Apps	Goals
Scotland	2011	3	0
Scotland	2012	1	0
Scotland	2013	8	1
Scotland	2014	5	0
Scotland	2015	3	0
Scotland	2016	7	0
Scotland	2017	1	0
Scotland	2018	1	0
Scotland	2021	11	1
Scotland	2022	6	0
Scotland	2023	2	0
Scotland	2024	11	0
Scotland	2025	7	0
Scotland	2026	4	0
Total		70	2

As of played 30 May 2026
Scores and results list Scotland goal tally first, score column indicates score after each Hanley goal.

List of international goals scored by Grant Hanley
No.	Date	Venue	Cap	Opponent	Score	Result	Competition	Ref.
1	22 March 2013	Hampden Park, Glasgow, Scotland	5	Wales	1–0	1–2	2014 FIFA World Cup qualification	
2	25 March 2021	Hampden Park, Glasgow, Scotland	30	Austria	1–1	2–2	2022 FIFA World Cup qualification	

== Honours ==
Newcastle United

- EFL Championship: 2016–17

Norwich City

- EFL Championship: 2018–19, 2020–21

Birmingham City

- EFL League One: 2024–25
- EFL Trophy runner-up: 2024–25

Individual

- EFL Championship Team of the Season: 2020–21
- PFA Team of the Year: 2020–21 Championship
