= Andrew Omobamidele =

Irish footballer (born 2002)

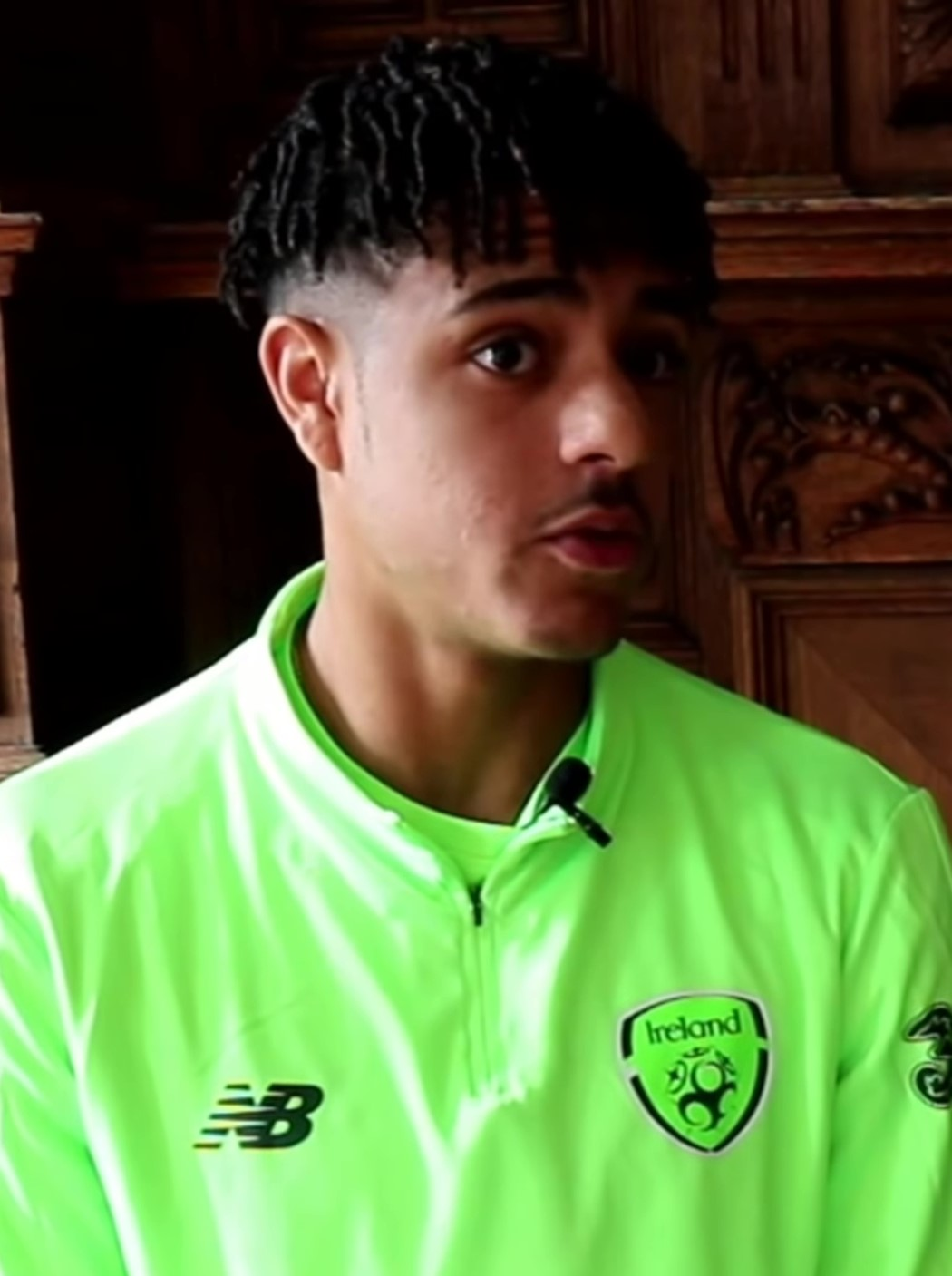
- Omobamidele in 2019

Personal information
- Full name: Andrew Abiola Omobamidele
- Date of birth: 23 June 2002 (age 24)
- Place of birth: Leixlip, County Kildare, Ireland
- Height: 1.88 m (6 ft 2 in)
- Position: Defender

Team information
- Current team: Anderlecht (on loan from Strasbourg)
- Number: 12

Youth career
- 2014–2019: Leixlip United
- 2019–2021: Norwich City

Senior career*
Years	Team	Apps	(Gls)
2021–2023	Norwich City	50	(2)
2023–2025	Nottingham Forest	11	(0)
2025	→ Strasbourg (loan)	10	(0)
2025–	Strasbourg	27	(1)
2026–	→ Anderlecht (loan)	2	(0)

International career^{‡}
2019	Republic of Ireland U17	3	(1)
2019	Republic of Ireland U18	2	(0)
2019	Republic of Ireland U19	4	(2)
2021	Republic of Ireland U21	1	(0)
2021–	Republic of Ireland	10	(0)
- * Club domestic league appearances and goals as of 19 September 2026 ‡ National team caps and goals as of 10 September 2024

Andrew Abiola Omobamidele (born 23 June 2002) is an Irish professional footballer who plays as a defender for Belgian Pro League club Anderlecht, on loan from Ligue 1 side Strasbourg and the Republic of Ireland national team.

== Early life ==
Omobamidele was born in Leixlip, County Kildare, to an Irish mother and a Nigerian father. As a youth, he played for the Dublin District Schoolboys League representative side alongside fellow future Irish international Gavin Bazunu.

== Club career ==
=== Norwich City ===
On 23 December 2020, Omobamidele signed a new professional contract with Norwich City.

He made his debut for Norwich on 16 January 2021 as a substitute in a 2–1 Championship league win against Cardiff City. Omobamidele's first start for Norwich was on in a 1–1 draw to Preston North End on 2 April 2021, when he played the full 90 minutes and was awarded Man of the Match. On 11 September 2021, he made his Premier League debut, playing the full 90 minutes in a 1–0 loss to Arsenal at the Emirates Stadium. On 31 October 2021, Omobamidele scored his first Premier League goal, which was also his first goal in senior football, heading home the equaliser from a corner in an eventual 2–1 loss to Leeds United at Carrow Road. In April 2023, he became the youngest player to captain the club in 42 years, in a 0–0 draw with Rotherham United.

=== Nottingham Forest ===
On 1 September 2023, Omobamidele signed with Premier League club Nottingham Forest until 2028, for a fee reported to be £11 million. He scored a debut goal for Forest in an FA Cup 3rd round replay against Blackpool, which Forest won 3–2 after extra time. He made his league debut for Forest on 20 January 2024, in a 3–2 defeat to Brentford at the Gtech Community Stadium.

=== Strasbourg ===
On 24 January 2025, Omobamidele joined Ligue 1 club Strasbourg on loan for the remainder of the season. Later that year, on 24 June, he finalised his permanent transfer by signing a contract until 2029. On 29 August 2026, he captained the team for the first time, in a 2–1 victory over RC Lens.

==== Anderlecht loan ====
On 2 September 2026, just 4 days after captaining Strasbourg for the first time, in a surprise move he signed for Belgian Pro League club RSC Anderlecht on a season-long loan.

== International career ==
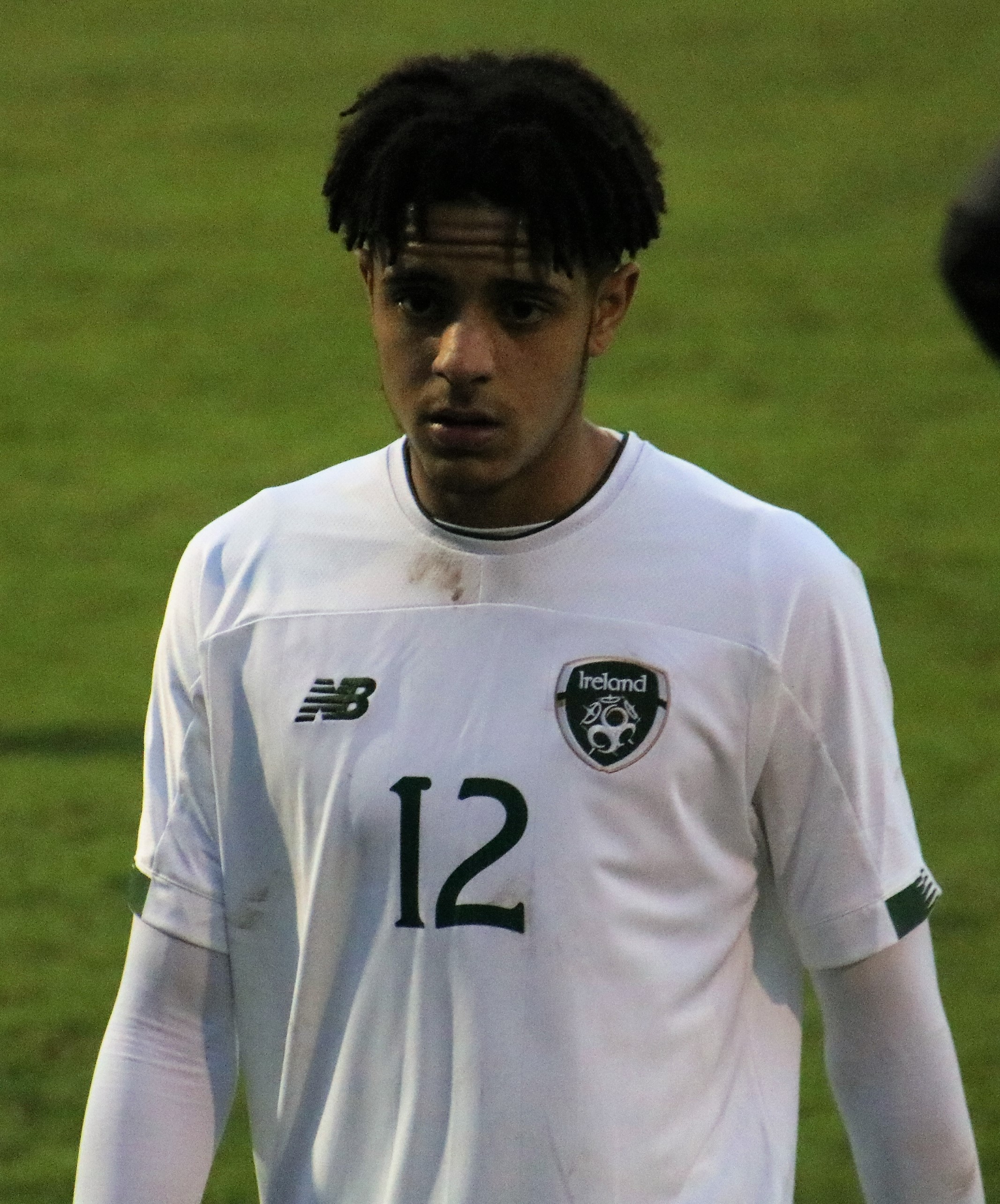
Omobamidele in action for the Republic of Ireland U19 team in 2019.

On 24 May 2021, Omobamidele received his first call up to the Republic of Ireland senior squad for the summer friendlies against Andorra and Hungary.

He made his international debut on 1 September 2021, as a 36th-minute substitute for the injured Dara O'Shea in a 2022 World Cup qualifier against Portugal at the Estádio Algarve in Faro.

== Career statistics ==
=== Club ===
As of match played 15 October 2026

Appearances and goals by club, season and competition
Club	Season	League			National cup (Note: Includes FA Cup, Coupe de France & Belgian Cup)		League cup (Note: Includes EFL Cup)		Europe		Other		Total	
Club	Season	Division	Apps	Goals	Apps	Goals	Apps	Goals	Apps	Goals	Apps	Goals	Apps	Goals
Norwich City U23	2019–20	—			—		—		—		2 (Note: Appearances in EFL Trophy)	0	2	0
Norwich City U23	2020–21	—			—		—		—		3	0	3	0
Norwich City U23	Total		—		—		—		—		5	0	5	0
Norwich City	2020–21	Championship	9	0	0	0	0	0	—		—		9	0
Norwich City	2021–22	Premier League	5	1	0	0	2	0	—		—		7	1
Norwich City	2022–23	Championship	34	1	1	0	0	0	—		—		35	1
Norwich City	2023–24	Championship	2	0	—		2	0	—		—		4	0
Norwich City	Total		50	2	1	0	4	0	—		—		55	2
Nottingham Forest	2023–24	Premier League	11	0	3	1	—		—		—		14	1
Nottingham Forest	2024–25	Premier League	0	0	0	0	1	0	—		—		1	0
Nottingham Forest	Total		11	0	3	1	1	0	—		—		15	1
Strasbourg (loan)	2024–25	Ligue 1	10	0	1	0	—		—		—		11	0
Strasbourg	2025–26	Ligue 1	25	1	3	0	—		13 (Note: Appearances in UEFA Conference League)	0	—		41	1
Strasbourg	2026–27	Ligue 1	2	0	—		—		—		—		2	0
Strasbourg	Total		27	1	3	0	—		13	0	—		43	1
Anderlecht (loan)	2026–27	Belgian Pro League	2	0	1	0	—		2 (Note: Appearances in UEFA Europa League)	0	—		5	0
Career total			100	3	9	1	5	0	15	0	5	0	134	4

=== International ===
As of match played 10 September 2024

Appearances and goals by national team and year
National team	Year	Apps	Goals
Republic of Ireland	2021	5	0
Republic of Ireland	2022	0	0
Republic of Ireland	2023	2	0
Republic of Ireland	2024	3	0
Total		10	0

== Honours ==
Norwich City

- EFL Championship: 2020–21
