= Liam Gibbs =

English footballer

Personal information
- Full name: Liam Geoffrey Gibbs
- Date of birth: 16 December 2002 (age 23)
- Place of birth: Bury St Edmunds, England
- Height: 5 ft 10 in (1.78 m)
- Position: Midfielder

Team information
- Current team: Preston North End (on loan from Norwich City)
- Number: 20

Youth career
- 2011–2019: Ipswich Town

Senior career*
Years	Team	Apps	(Gls)
2019–2021	Ipswich Town	1	(0)
2021–	Norwich City	85	(2)
2026–	→ Preston North End (loan)	5	(0)
- * Club domestic league appearances and goals as of 21:41, 14 October 2026 (UTC)

Liam Geoffrey Gibbs (born 16 December 2002) is an English professional footballer who plays as a midfielder for EFL Championship club Preston North End on loan from EFL Championship club Norwich City.

== Career ==
=== Ipswich Town ===
Gibbs joined the Ipswich Town academy in 2011, progressing through the club's youth system and captaining the club's youth sides at under-15 and under-16 levels. He signed a scholarship in 2018. He made his first-team debut for the club on 12 November 2019, appearing as a second-half substitute in a 1–0 away loss to Colchester United in an EFL Trophy group stage match. On 16 December, Gibbs signed his first professional contract with the club, signing an 18-month deal.

=== Norwich City ===
On 23 July 2021, Gibbs joined East Anglian rivals Norwich City for an undisclosed fee, signing a four-year deal.

In April 2023, Gibbs scored his first senior goal for Norwich in an away EFL Championship fixture against Blackburn Rovers. In May 2023, he was named as the club's Young Player of the Season.

In July 2023, Gibbs signed a new five-year deal with Norwich to run through to 2028.

==== Loan to Preston North End ====
On 1 September 2026, Gibbs joined Preston North End on a season-long loan.

== Career statistics ==
As of match played 13 October 2026

Appearances and goals by club, season and competition
Club	Season	League			FA Cup		League Cup		Other		Total	
Club	Season	Division	Apps	Goals	Apps	Goals	Apps	Goals	Apps	Goals	Apps	Goals
Ipswich Town	2019–20	League One	0	0	0	0	0	0	1 (Note: Appearance(s) in EFL Trophy)	0	1	0
Ipswich Town	2020–21	League One	1	0	0	0	0	0	2	0	3	0
Ipswich Town	Total		1	0	0	0	0	0	3	0	4	0
Norwich City	2021–22	Premier League	0	0	0	0	0	0	—		0	0
Norwich City	2022–23	Championship	34	1	1	0	2	0	—		37	1
Norwich City	2023–24	Championship	22	0	2	0	3	0	—		27	0
Norwich City	2024–25	Championship	9	0	0	0	2	0	—		11	0
Norwich City	2025–26	Championship	19	1	3	0	2	0	—		24	1
Norwich City	2026–27	Championship	0	0	—		1	0	—		1	0
Norwich City	Total		86	2	6	0	10	0	—		102	2
Preston North End (loan)	2026–27	Championship	5	0	0	0	—		—		5	0
Career total			91	2	6	0	10	0	3	0	110	2
