= 2021–22 Norwich City F.C. season =

Norwich City
2021–22 season
- Owner: Delia Smith; Michael Wynn-Jones
- Head coach: Daniel Farke (until 6 November 2021); Dean Smith (from 15 November 2021)
- Stadium: Carrow Road
- Premier League: 20th (relegated)
- FA Cup: Fifth round
- EFL Cup: Third round
- Top goalscorer: League: Teemu Pukki (11); All: Teemu Pukki (11)
Home colours	Away colours	Third colours

The 2021–22 Norwich City F.C. season was the club's 120th season in existence and the first season back in the Premier League. In addition to the domestic league, Norwich City also participated in this season's editions of the FA Cup and the EFL Cup.

== BK8 Sports shirt sponsorship ==
On 7 June 2021, Norwich City announced that they had terminated the shirt sponsorship with existing sponsor Dafabet and signed a new club record deal with betting firm BK8 Sports. Within hours of the announcement pressure from fans forced BK8 Sports to remove adult content from their social media accounts. Continued pressure from fans and fans groups led to the club and the betting firm cancelling the deal by mutual consent on 10 June. On 25 June the club announced Lotus Cars as their front of shirt sponsor for the 2021–22 Premier League season. JD Sports followed as shirt sleeve sponsor on 9 July.

== Transfers ==
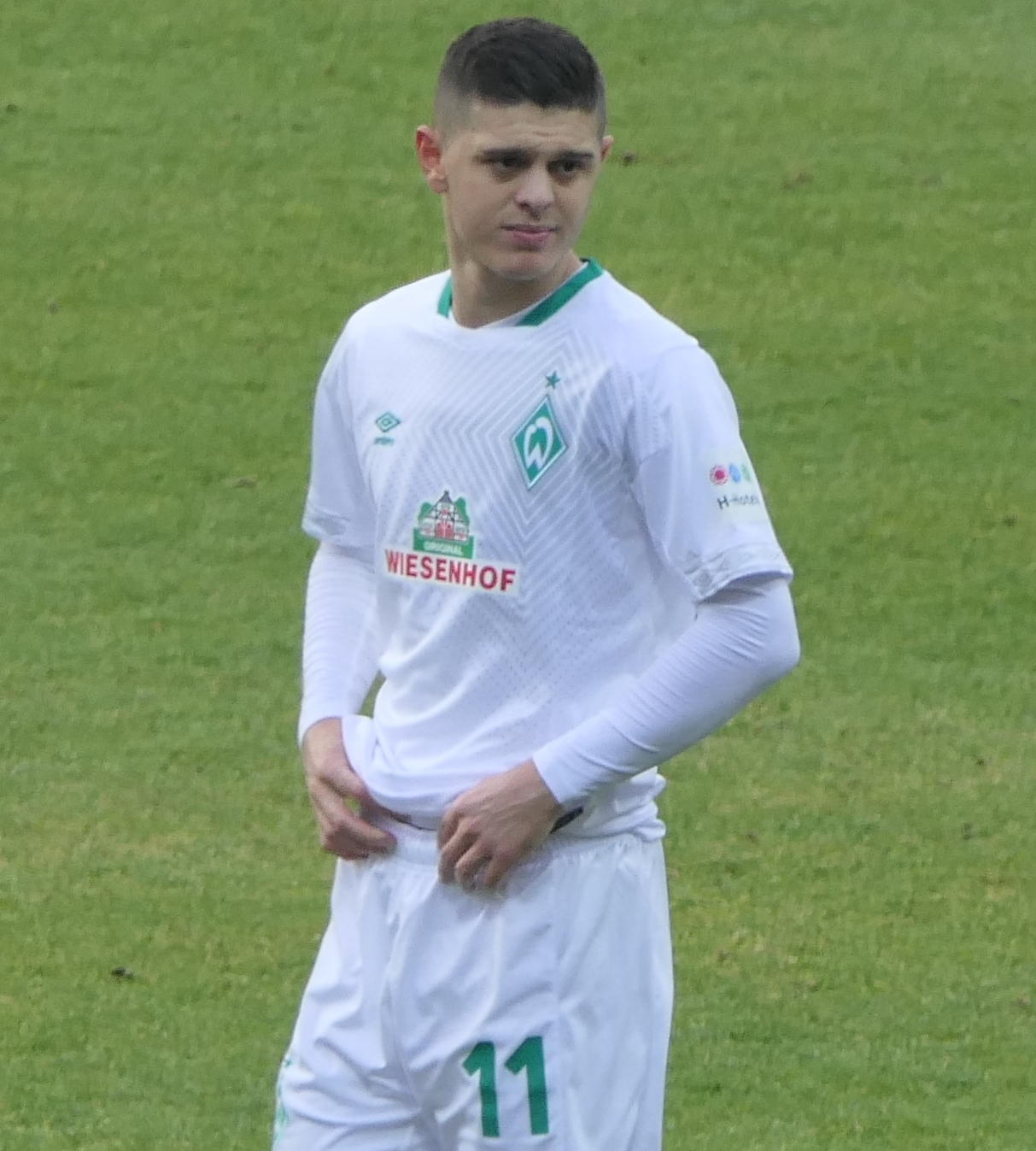
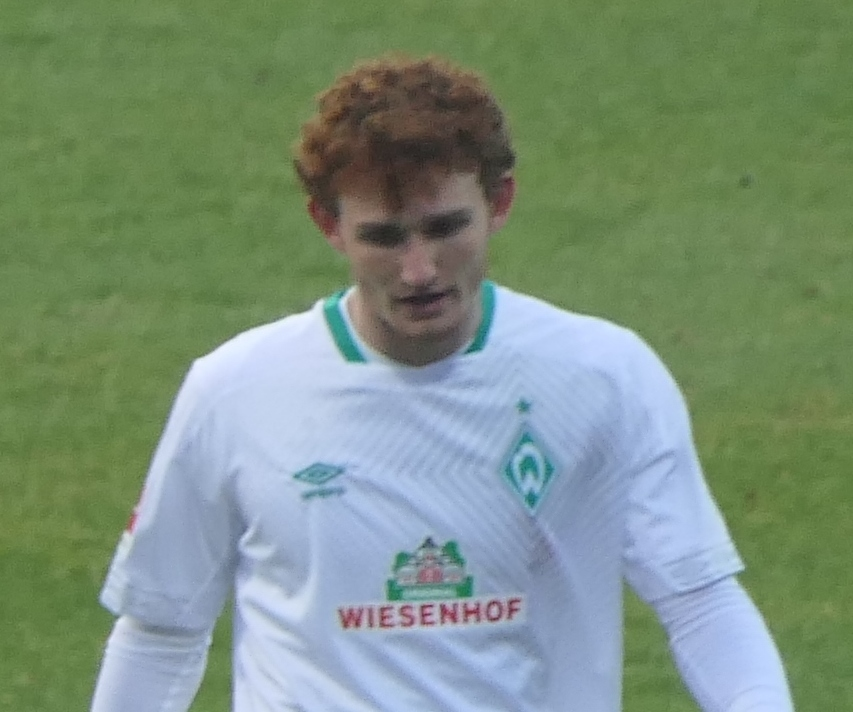
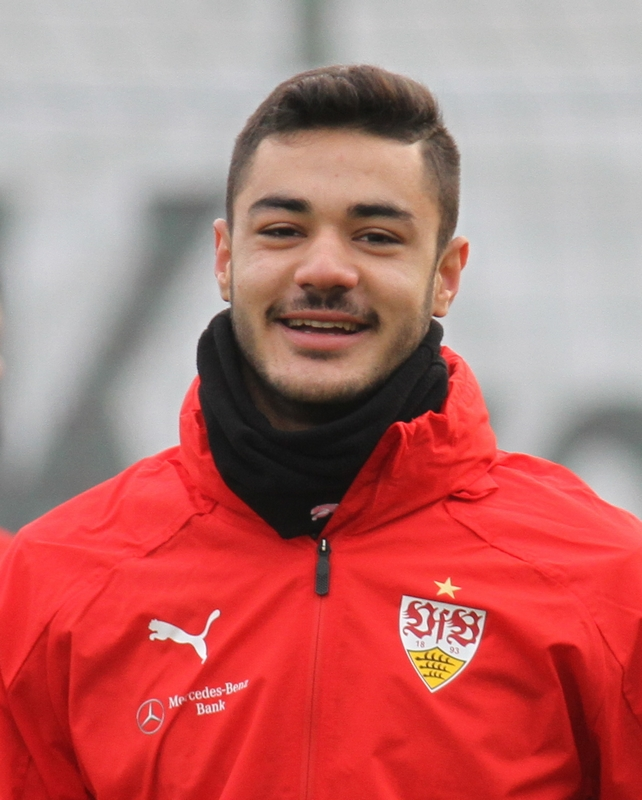
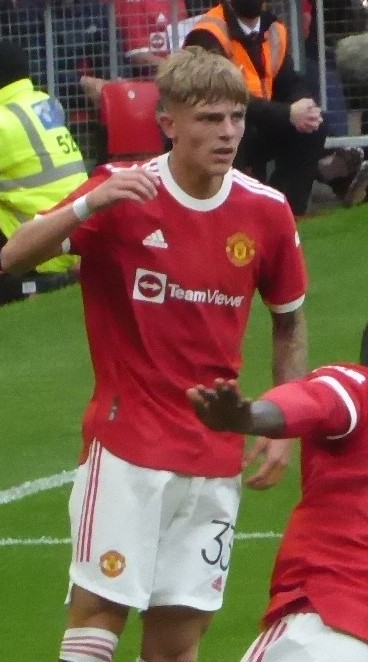
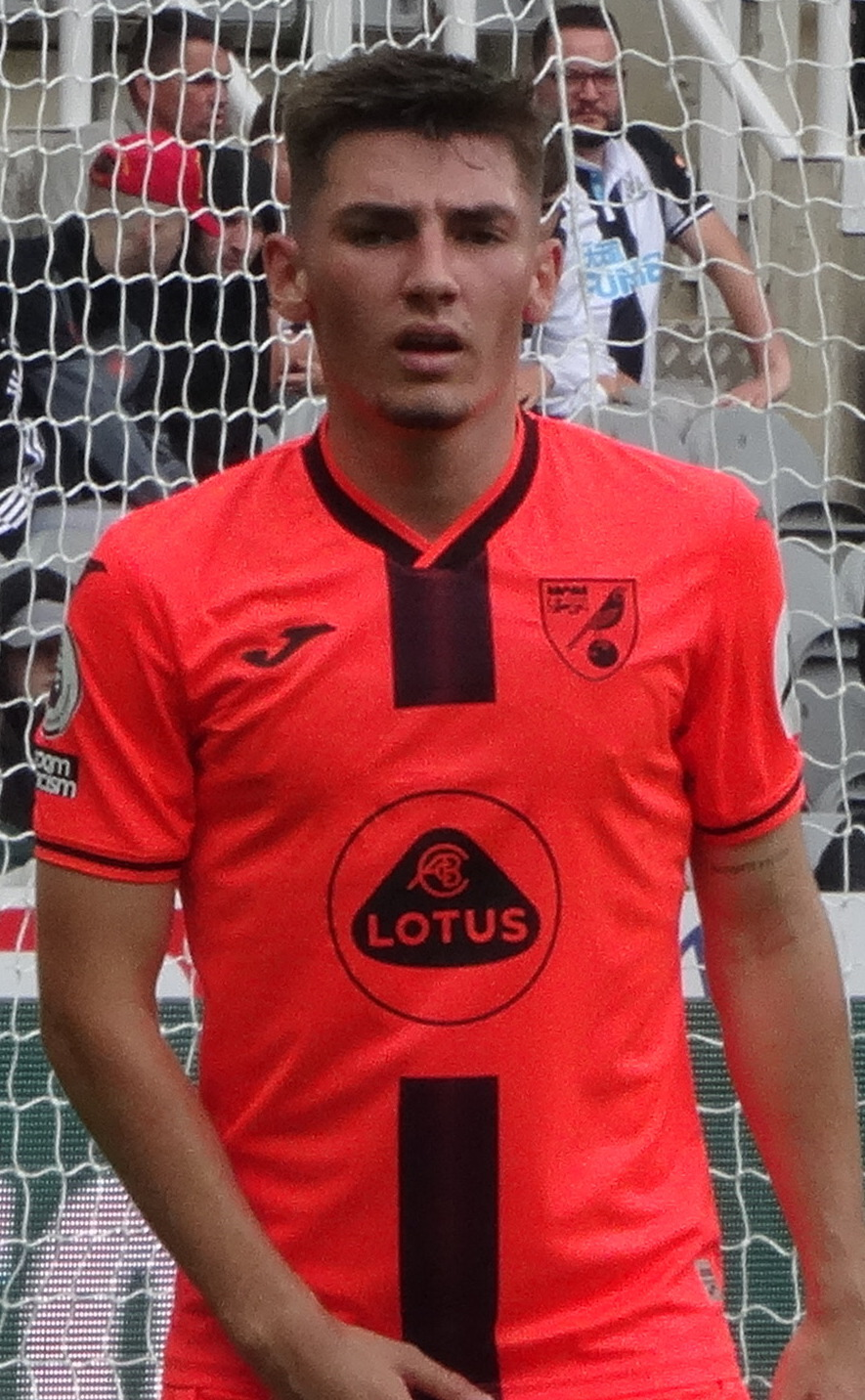
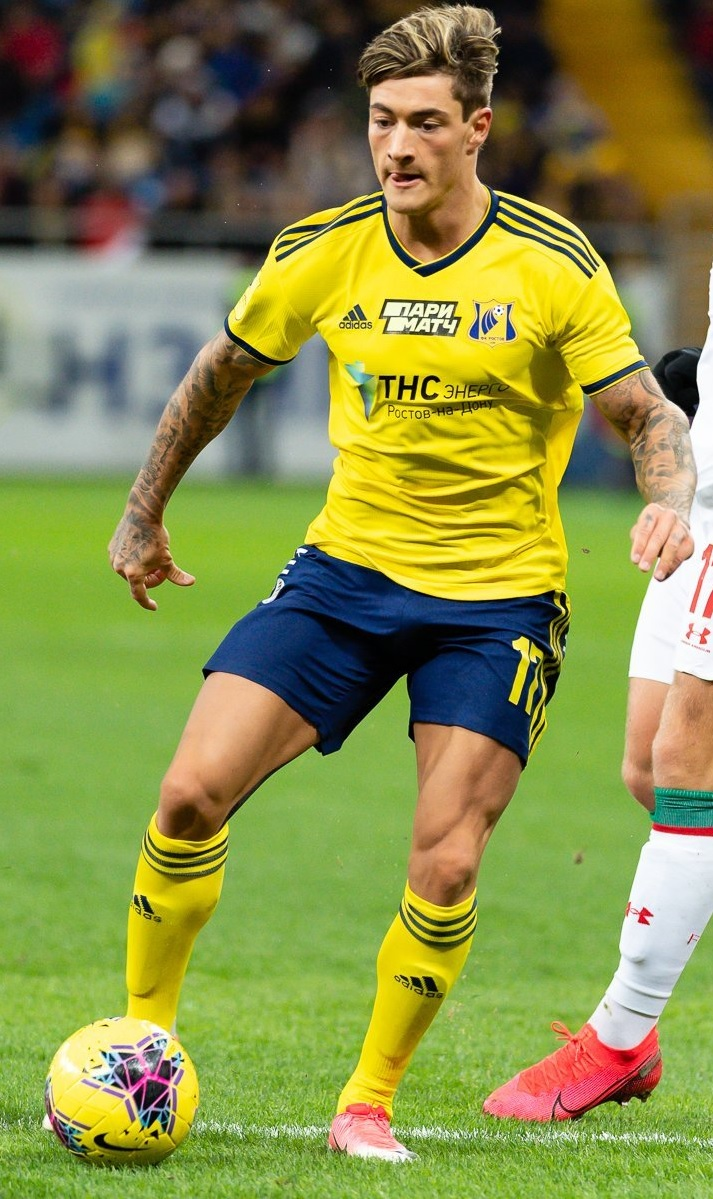
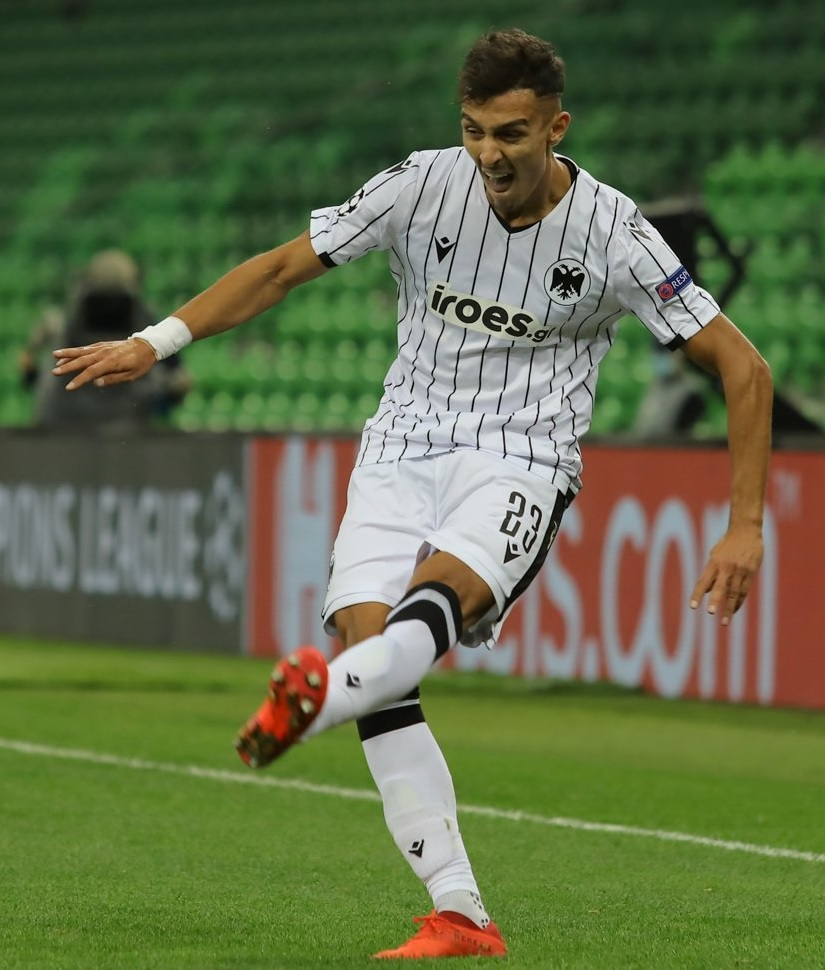
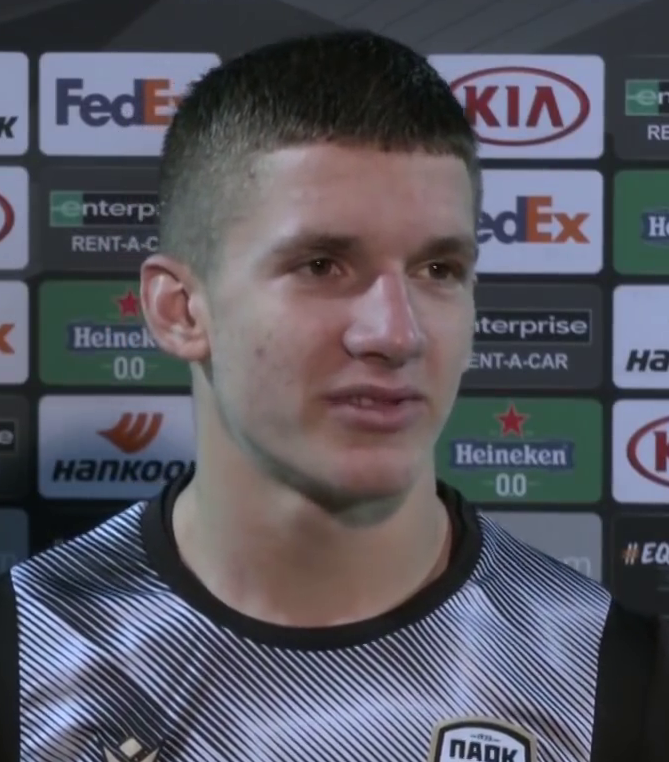
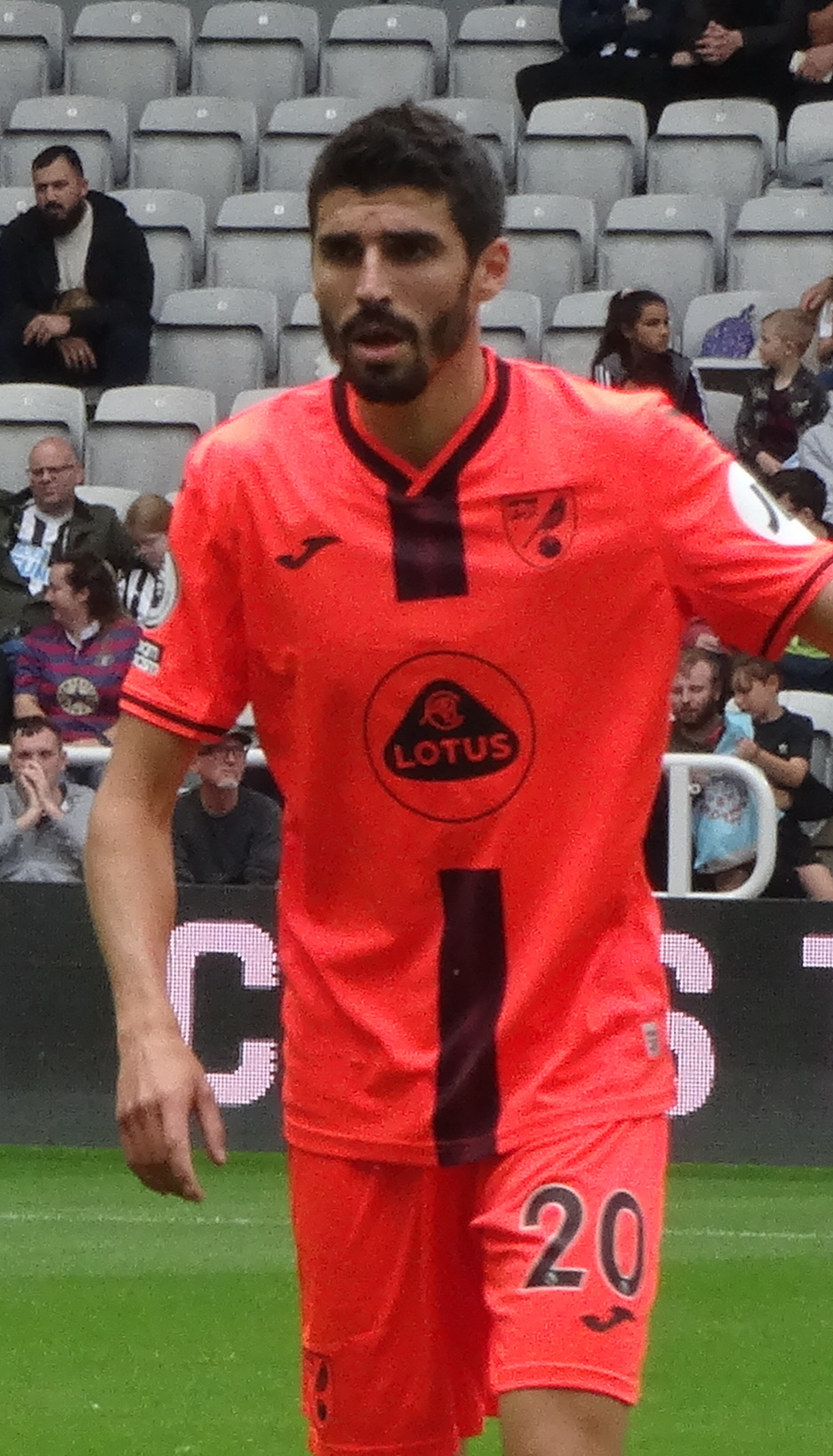
Milot Rashica and Joshua Sargent joining the Canaries from relegated Werder Bremen. Joining them were loanees Ozan Kabak, Brandon Williams, Mathias Normann and Billy Gilmour as well as new signings, Dimitris Giannoulis, Christos Tzolis and Pierre Lees-Melou.

=== Transfers in ===
Date	Position	Nationality	Name	From	Fee	Ref.
22 June 2021	LW	(Kosovo)	Milot Rashica	(Germany) Werder Bremen	Undisclosed (Note: Fee reported as £9,400,000)	
23 June 2021	GK	(England)	Angus Gunn	(England) Southampton	Undisclosed (Note: Fee reported as £5,000,000, which could rise to £10,000,000)	
24 June 2021	AM	(Scotland)	Flynn Clarke	(England) Peterborough United	Undisclosed	
1 July 2021	CF	(England)	Kenny Coker	(England) Southend United	Undisclosed	
1 July 2021	LB	(Greece)	Dimitris Giannoulis	(Greece) PAOK	Undisclosed	
1 July 2021	CB	(England)	Ben Gibson	(England) Burnley	Undisclosed	
7 July 2021	GK	(Northern Ireland)	Dylan Berry	(England) Northampton Town	Undisclosed	
13 July 2021	CM	(France)	Pierre Lees-Melou	(France) OGC Nice	Undisclosed (Note: Fee reported as £3,500,000, which could rise to £4,500,000)	
23 July 2021	CM	(England)	Liam Gibbs	(England) Ipswich Town	Undisclosed	
9 August 2021	CF	(United States)	Josh Sargent	(Germany) Werder Bremen	Undisclosed (Note: Fee reported as £8,000,000)	
12 August 2021	LW	(Greece)	Christos Tzolis	(Greece) PAOK	Undisclosed (Note: Fee reported as £8,800,000, which could rise to £10,000,000)	

=== Loans in ===
Date from	Position	Nationality	Name	From	Date until	Ref.
2 July 2021	DM	(Scotland)	Billy Gilmour	(England) Chelsea	30 June 2022	
23 August 2021	LB	(England)	Brandon Williams	(England) Manchester United	30 June 2022	
29 August 2021	DM	(Norway)	Mathias Normann	(Russia) FC Rostov	30 June 2022	
30 August 2021	CB	(Turkey)	Ozan Kabak	(Germany) FC Schalke 04	30 June 2022	

=== Loans out ===
Date from	Position	Nationality	Name	To	Date until	Ref.
1 July 2021	CM	(Scotland)	Reece McAlear	(Scotland) Inverness Caledonian Thistle	End of season	
1 July 2021	AM	(England)	Josh Martin	(England) Milton Keynes Dons	17 January 2022 (Note: On 17 January, Martin was recalled from his loan spell at Milton Keynes Dons, to facilitate a move to Doncaster Rovers.)	
2 July 2021	GK	(Wales)	Daniel Barden	(Scotland) Livingston	End of season	
3 July 2021	CF	(United States)	Sebastian Soto	(Portugal) FC Porto B	26 January 2022 (Note: On 26 January, Soto was recalled to facilitate a loan move to Livingston.)	
6 July 2021	CF	(Switzerland)	Josip Drmić	(Croatia) HNK Rijeka	End of season	
8 July 2021	CB	(England)	Akin Famewo	(England) Charlton Athletic	End of season	
12 July 2021	LB	(England)	Sam McCallum	(England) Queens Park Rangers	End of season	
20 July 2021	CF	(Morocco)	Gassan Ahadme	(England) Portsmouth	13 January 2022 (Note: On 13 January, Ahadme was recalled early from his loan at Portsmouth, to facilitate a permanent move to Burton Albion.)	
28 July 2021	LW	(Luxembourg)	Danel Sinani	(England) Huddersfield Town	End of season	
13 August 2021	LW	(England)	Matthew Dennis	(England) Southend United	End of season	
17 August 2021	CF	(Belgium)	Tyrese Omotoye	(England) Leyton Orient	5 January 2022 (Note: On 5 January 2022, Omotoye was recalled from his loan at Leyton Orient to facilitate a loan move to Carlisle United.)	
19 August 2021	CM	(England)	Daniel Adshead	(England) Gillingham	11 February 2022 (Note: On 11 February, Adshead returned to Norwich due to injury)	
25 August 2021	CF	(England)	Jordan Hugill	(England) West Bromwich Albion	29 January 2022 (Note: On 29 January, Hugill was recalled.)	
29 August 2021	LW	(Cuba)	Onel Hernández	(England) Middlesbrough	14 January 2022 (Note: On 14 January, Hernández was recalled from his loan spell at Middlesbrough.)	
31 August 2021	GK	(England)	Aston Oxborough	(England) Barnet	End of season	
24 September 2021	GK	(Scotland)	Archie Mair	(England) Lincoln City	End of season	
4 January 2022	CF	(Scotland)	Thomas Dickson-Peters	(England) Gillingham	End of season	
5 January 2022	CF	(Belgium)	Tyrese Omotoye	(England) Carlisle United	End of season	
6 January 2022	RB	(England)	Bali Mumba	(England) Peterborough United	End of season	
10 January 2022	CB	(Belgium)	Rocky Bushiri	(Scotland) Hibernian	End of season	
14 January 2022	RW	(Cuba)	Onel Hernández	(England) Birmingham City	End of season	
17 January 2022	LW	(England)	Josh Martin	(England) Doncaster Rovers	End of season	
26 January 2022	CF	(United States)	Sebastian Soto	(Scotland) Livingston	End of season	
30 January 2022	CF	(England)	Jordan Hugill	(Wales) Cardiff City	End of season	
31 January 2022	CM	(England)	Todd Cantwell	(England) AFC Bournemouth	End of season	

=== Transfers out ===
Date	Position	Nationality	Name	To	Fee	Ref.
10 June 2021	RW	(Argentina)	Emiliano Buendía	(England) Aston Villa	Undisclosed	
29 June 2021	CM	(Germany)	Moritz Leitner	(Switzerland) FC Zürich	Mutual consent	
30 June 2021	DM	(England)	Zach Dronfield	(England) Wealdstone	Released	
30 June 2021	LB	(Germany)	Philip Heise	(Germany) Karlsruher SC	Free transfer	
30 June 2021	CM	(Republic of Ireland)	William Hondermarck	(England) Barnsley	Released	
30 June 2021	CB	(England)	Louis Lomas	(England) Brackley Town	Released	
30 June 2021	GK	(Norway)	Ørjan Nyland	(England) Bournemouth	Released	
30 June 2021	AM	(Germany)	Marco Stiepermann	(Germany) SC Paderborn	Mutual consent	
30 June 2021	DM	(Norway)	Alexander Tettey	(Norway) Rosenborg BK	Released	
30 June 2021	RB	(England)	Jordan Thomas	(England) Barnet	Released	
30 June 2021	RB	(Wales)	Ethen Vaughan	(England) Burnley	Released	
30 June 2021	CM	(Bosnia and Herzegovina)	Mario Vrančić	(England) Stoke City	Released	
24 July 2021	DM	(Wales)	Louis Thompson	(England) Portsmouth	Mutual consent	
18 August 2021	LB	(Belgium)	Rob Nizet	(Italy) Lecce	Undisclosed	
26 August 2021	DM	(Germany)	Tom Trybull	(Germany) Hannover 96	Mutual consent	
30 August 2021	CM	(France)	Melvin Sitti	(France) FC Annecy	Mutual consent	
31 August 2021	CB	(Switzerland)	Timm Klose	(England) Bristol City	Mutual consent	
3 September 2021	RM	(Scotland)	Aidan Fitzpatrick	(Scotland) Queen of the South	Mutual consent	
1 January 2022	MF	(Iceland)	Ísak Þorvaldsson	(Iceland) Breiðablik	Free	
13 January 2022	SS	(Morocco)	Gassan Ahadme	(England) Burton Albion	Undisclosed	
7 March 2022	CF	(England)	Shae Hutchinson	Free agent	Mutual consent	

== Pre-season friendlies ==
Norwich City confirmed friendlies against King's Lynn Town, Lincoln City, Huddersfield Town, Coventry City Sheffield United, Gillingham and Newcastle United as part of the club's pre-season preparations.

16 July 2021 Friendly	King's Lynn Town	1–3	Norwich City	King's Lynn
19:00 BST	Barrows 42'	Report	Dowell 20', 39'; Idah 87'	Stadium: The Walks

20 July 2021 Friendly	Norwich City	1–0	Lincoln City	Norwich
16:00 BST	Lees-Melou 88'	Report		Stadium: Lotus Training Centre; Attendance: 0 (behind closed doors)

23 July 2021 Friendly	Norwich City	2–0	Huddersfield Town	Norwich
13:30 BST	Pukki 14'; Idah 86'	Report		Stadium: Lotus Training Centre; Attendance: 0 (behind closed doors)

28 July 2021 Friendly	Norwich City	Cancelled	Coventry City	Chesterfield
18:00 BST				Stadium: Technique Stadium
Note: The match was cancelled due to a small number of positive COVID-19 cases within the squad.

31 July 2021 Friendly	Sheffield United	Cancelled	Norwich City	Sheffield
15:00 BST				Stadium: Bramall Lane
Note: The match was cancelled due to a small number of positive COVID-19 test results within the Norwich City camp.

3 August 2021 Friendly	Norwich City	5–0	Gillingham	Norwich
20:00 BST	Lees-Melou 10'; Idah 36', 73'; Rupp 61'; Sørensen 90'	Report		Stadium: Carrow Road; Attendance: 10,692

7 August 2021 Friendly	Newcastle United	3–0	Norwich City	Newcastle upon Tyne
14:00 BST	Ritchie 55'; Gayle 74', 88'	Report		Stadium: St James' Park; Referee: Michael Salisbury

== Competitions ==
=== Overview ===
Competition	First match	Last match	Starting round	Final position	Record							
Competition	First match	Last match	Starting round	Final position	Pld	W	D	L	GF	GA	GD	Win %
Premier League	14 August 2021	21 May 2022	Matchday 1	20th	38	5	7	26	23	84	−61	13.16
FA Cup	9 January 2022	2 March 2022	Third round	Fifth round	3	2	0	1	3	2	+1	66.67
EFL Cup	24 August 2021	21 September 2021	Second round	Third round	2	1	0	1	6	3	+3	50.00
Total					43	8	7	28	32	89	−57	18.60

Source: Soccerway

=== Premier League ===
==== League table ====
Pos	Team	Pld	W	D	L	GF	GA	GD	Pts	Qualification or relegation
16	Everton	38	11	6	21	43	66	−23	39	
17	Leeds United	38	9	11	18	42	79	−37	38	
18	Burnley (R)	38	7	14	17	34	53	−19	35	Relegation to EFL Championship
19	Watford (R)	38	6	5	27	34	77	−43	23	Relegation to EFL Championship
20	Norwich City (R)	38	5	7	26	23	84	−61	22	Relegation to EFL Championship

Source: Premier League
Rules for classification: 1) Points; 2) Goal difference; 3) Goals scored; 4) If the champions, relegated teams or qualified teams for UEFA competitions cannot be determined by rules 1 to 3, rules 4.1 to 4.3 are applied – 4.1) Points gained in head-to-head record between such teams; 4.2) Away goals scored in head-to-head record between such teams; 4.3) Play-offs
(R) Relegated

==== Results summary ====
Overall								Home						Away					
Pld	W	D	L	GF	GA	GD	Pts	W	D	L	GF	GA	GD	W	D	L	GF	GA	GD
38	5	7	26	23	84	−61	22	3	3	13	12	43	−31	2	4	13	11	41	−30

==== Results by matchday ====
Matchday	1	2	3	4	5	6	7	8	9	10	11	12	13	14	15	16	17	18	19	20	21	22	23	24	25	26	27	28	29	30	31	32	33	34	35	36	37	38
Ground	H	A	H	A	H	A	A	H	A	H	A	H	H	A	A	H	H	H	A	A	H	A	H	H	A	A	H	H	A	A	H	A	H	A	H	A	A	H
Result	L	L	L	L	L	L	D	D	L	L	W	W	D	D	L	L	L	L	L	L	W	W	D	L	L	L	L	L	L	D	W	L	L	L	L	L	D	L
Position	19	20	19	20	20	20	20	20	20	20	20	19	19	19	20	20	20	20	20	20	18	17	18	18	20	20	20	20	20	20	20	20	20	20	20	20	20	20

A = Away; H = Home; W = Win; D = Draw; L = Loss

==== Matches ====
The league fixtures were confirmed on 16 June 2021.

14 August 2021 1	Norwich City	0–3	Liverpool	Norwich
17:30 BST	Cantwell (yellow card) 53'	Report	Milner (yellow card) 25'; Jota 26'; Firmino 65'; Salah 74'	Stadium: Carrow Road; Attendance: 27,023; Referee: Andre Marriner

21 August 2021 2	Manchester City	5–0	Norwich City	Manchester
15:00 BST	Krul 7' (o.g.); Grealish 22'; Gündoğan (yellow card) 39'; Laporte 64'; Sterling 71'; Mahrez 84'	Report		Stadium: City of Manchester Stadium; Attendance: 51,437; Referee: Graham Scott

28 August 2021 3	Norwich City	1–2	Leicester City	Norwich
15:00 BST	Lees-Melou (yellow card) 25'; Pukki 44' (pen.); Cantwell (yellow card) 82'	Report	Vardy 8'; Albrighton (yellow card) 69', (goal) 76'	Stadium: Carrow Road; Attendance: 26,765; Referee: Robert Jones

11 September 2021 4	Arsenal	1–0	Norwich City	Holloway
15:00 BST	Aubameyang 66'; Partey (yellow card) 88'; White (yellow card) 90+2'	Report	Aarons (yellow card) 42'; Hanley (yellow card) 48'	Stadium: Emirates Stadium; Attendance: 59,337; Referee: Michael Oliver

18 September 2021 5	Norwich City	1–3	Watford	Norwich
15:00 BST	Pukki 35'; Williams (yellow card) 90+5'	Report	Dennis 17'; Cathcart (yellow card) 37'; Sarr 63', 80'	Stadium: Carrow Road; Attendance: 26,649; Referee: Robert Jones

25 September 2021 6	Everton	2–0	Norwich City	Walton
15:00 BST	Townsend 29' (pen.); Digne (yellow card) 56'; Doucoure 77'; Gordon (yellow card) 90+2'	Report	Kabak (yellow card) 54'; Lees-Melou (yellow card) 80'; Williams (yellow card) 84'	Stadium: Goodison Park; Attendance: 38,821; Referee: David Coote

2 October 2021 7	Burnley	0–0	Norwich City	Burnley
15:00 BST	Tarkowski (yellow card) 11'; Wood (yellow card) 24'; Lowton (yellow card) 25'; Brownhill (yellow card) 33'; Rodriguez (yellow card) 49'	Report	Normann (yellow card) 27'; Aarons (yellow card) 74'	Stadium: Turf Moor; Attendance: 17,427; Referee: Kevin Friend

16 October 2021 8	Norwich City	0–0	Brighton & Hove Albion	Norwich
15:00 BST	Kabak (yellow card) 30'; Giannoulis (yellow card) 50'; Pukki (yellow card) 75'	Report	Veltman (yellow card) 15'; Lallana (yellow card) 24'; Cucurella (yellow card) 41'; Duffy (yellow card) 90+3'; Burn (yellow card) 90+4'	Stadium: Carrow Road; Attendance: 26,777; Referee: Peter Bankes

23 October 2021 9	Chelsea	7–0	Norwich City	Fulham
12:30 BST	Mount 8', 85' (pen.), 90+1'; Hudson-Odoi 18'; James 42'; Chilwell 57'; Aarons 62' (o.g.)	Report	Lees-Melou (yellow card) 45'; Gibson (yellow card) 55' (yellow-red card) 65'; Normann (yellow card) 83'	Stadium: Stamford Bridge; Attendance: 40,113; Referee: Andrew Madley

31 October 2021 10	Norwich City	1–2	Leeds United	Norwich
14:00 GMT	McLean (yellow card) 46'; Omobamidele 58'	Report	Rodrigo (yellow card) 32', (goal) 60'; Harrison (yellow card) 44'; Raphinha 56'; Shackleton (yellow card) 67'; Drameh (yellow card) 79'	Stadium: Carrow Road; Attendance: 26,913; Referee: Anthony Taylor

6 November 2021 11	Brentford	1–2	Norwich City	Brentford
15:00 GMT	Toney (yellow card) 4'; Goode (yellow card) 28'; Henry 60'	Report	Normann 6', (yellow card) 32'; Pukki 29' (pen.); Omobamidele (yellow card) 52'; Aarons (yellow card) 90'	Stadium: Brentford Community Stadium; Attendance: 16,837; Referee: Jarred Gillett

20 November 2021 12	Norwich City	2–1	Southampton	Norwich
15:00 GMT	Pukki 7'; Williams (yellow card) 64'; Hanley 79'; Krul (yellow card) 90+3'; Normann (yellow card) 90+4'	Report	Adams 4'; Bednarek (yellow card) 64'; Walker-Peters (yellow card) 71'	Stadium: Carrow Road; Attendance: 26,885; Referee: Martin Atkinson

27 November 2021 13	Norwich City	0–0	Wolverhampton Wanderers	Norwich
15:00 GMT	Gilmour (yellow card) 26'; Gibson (yellow card) 50'	Report	Neves (yellow card) 31'; Semedo (yellow card) 53'	Stadium: Carrow Road; Attendance: 26,911; Referee: Simon Hooper

30 November 2021 14	Newcastle United	1–1	Norwich City	Newcastle upon Tyne
19:30 GMT	Clark (red card) 9'; Wilson 61' (pen.)	Report	Pukki 79'	Stadium: St James' Park; Attendance: 50,757; Referee: Andrew Madley

5 December 2021 15	Tottenham Hotspur	3–0	Norwich City	Tottenham
14:00 GMT	Lucas 10'; Reguilón (yellow card) 16'; Sánchez 67'; Son Heung-min 77'	Report	Pukki (yellow card) 14'; Gilmour (yellow card) 34'	Stadium: Tottenham Hotspur Stadium; Attendance: 57,088; Referee: Jarred Gillett

11 December 2021 16	Norwich City	0–1	Manchester United	Norwich
17:30 GMT	Lees-Melou (yellow card) 90+4'	Report	Ronaldo 75' (pen.); Dalot (yellow card) 77'	Stadium: Carrow Road; Attendance: 27,066; Referee: Darren England

14 December 2021 17	Norwich City	0–2	Aston Villa	Norwich
19:45 GMT	Aarons (yellow card) 46'; Byram (yellow card) 55'; Williams (yellow card) 64'	Report	Ramsey 34'; Konsa (yellow card) 49'; Watkins 87'	Stadium: Carrow Road; Attendance: 26,836; Referee: David Coote

18 December 2021	West Ham United	Postponed	Norwich City	Stratford
15:00 GMT		Report		Stadium: London Stadium
Note: The match was postponed due to a COVID-19 outbreak in Norwich's squad.

26 December 2021 18	Norwich City	0–5	Arsenal	Norwich
15:00 GMT	Płacheta (yellow card) 41'	Report	Saka 6', 67'; Xhaka (yellow card) 39'; Tierney 44'; Partey (yellow card) 62'; Lacazette 84' (pen.); Smith Rowe 90+1'	Stadium: Carrow Road; Attendance: 26,940; Referee: Graham Scott

28 December 2021 19	Crystal Palace	3–0	Norwich City	Selhurst
15:00 GMT	Édouard 8' (pen.), (yellow card) 22'; Mateta 38'; Schlupp 42'	Report	Gibson (yellow card) 10'; Byram (yellow card) 29'	Stadium: Selhurst Park; Attendance: 24,433; Referee: Paul Tierney

1 January 2022	Leicester City	Postponed	Norwich City	Leicester
15:00 GMT		Report		Stadium: King Power Stadium
Note: The match was postponed due to a COVID-19 outbreak in Norwich's squad.

12 January 2022 20	West Ham United	2–0	Norwich City	Stratford
19:45 GMT	Bowen 42', 85'	Report		Stadium: London Stadium; Attendance: 59,775; Referee: Simon Hooper

15 January 2022 21	Norwich City	2–1	Everton	Norwich
15:00 GMT	Keane 16' (o.g.); Idah 18'; Sargent (yellow card) 50'; Aarons (yellow card) 66'; Pukki (yellow card) 70'	Report	Keane (yellow card) 47'; Richarlison 60'	Stadium: Carrow Road; Attendance: 26,629; Referee: Andrew Madley

21 January 2022 22	Watford	0–3	Norwich City	Watford
20:00 GMT	Dennis (yellow card) 36' (yellow-red card) 78'	Report	McLean (yellow card) 38'; Sargent 51', 74'; Kucka 90+2' (o.g.)	Stadium: Vicarage Road; Attendance: 20,782; Referee: Mike Dean

9 February 2022 23	Norwich City	1–1	Crystal Palace	Norwich
19:45 GMT	Pukki 1'; Williams (yellow card) 53'	Report	Zaha 60'; Mateta (yellow card) 75'; Gallagher (yellow card) 83'	Stadium: Carrow Road; Attendance: 26,652; Referee: Paul Tierney

12 February 2022 24	Norwich City	0–4	Manchester City	Norwich
17:30 GMT		Report	Dias (yellow card) 17'; Sterling 31', 70', 90', (yellow card) 90+2'; Foden 48'	Stadium: Carrow Road; Attendance: 27,010; Referee: Andre Marriner

19 February 2022 25	Liverpool	3–1	Norwich City	Liverpool
15:00 GMT	Mané 64'; Salah 67'; Díaz 81'	Report	Williams (yellow card) 40'; Rashica 48'	Stadium: Anfield; Attendance: 53,135; Referee: Mike Dean

25 February 2022 26	Southampton	2–0	Norwich City	Southampton
20:00 GMT	Adams 36'; Salisu (yellow card) 39'; Romeu 88'	Report	Pukki (yellow card) 59'; Williams (yellow card) 90'	Stadium: St Mary's Stadium; Attendance: 31,182; Referee: Simon Hooper

5 March 2022 27	Norwich City	1–3	Brentford	Norwich
15:00 GMT	Gibson (yellow card) 51'; Hanley (yellow card) 79'; Pukki 90+2'	Report	Ajer (yellow card) 24'; Toney 32', 52' (pen.), 58' (pen.); Eriksen (yellow card) 40'; Jansson (yellow card) 79'; Roerslev (yellow card) 89'; Mbeumo (yellow card) 90+1'	Stadium: Carrow Road; Attendance: 26,887; Referee: Anthony Taylor

10 March 2022 28	Norwich City	1–3	Chelsea	Norwich
19:30 GMT	Pukki 69' (pen.)	Report	Chalobah 3', (yellow card) 80'; Mount 14'; Mendy (yellow card) 68'; Havertz 90'	Stadium: Carrow Road; Attendance: 26,722; Referee: Martin Atkinson

13 March 2022 29	Leeds United	2–1	Norwich City	Leeds
14:00 GMT	Rodrigo 14'; Ayling (yellow card) 26'; Harrison (yellow card) 71'; James (yellow card) 77'; Gelhardt 90+4'	Report	Aarons (yellow card) 77'; McLean 90+1'	Stadium: Elland Road; Attendance: 36,321; Referee: Stuart Attwell

2 April 2022 30	Brighton & Hove Albion	0–0	Norwich City	Falmer
15:00 BST	Lamptey (yellow card) 68'	Report	McLean (yellow card) 82'	Stadium: Falmer Stadium; Attendance: 31,245; Referee: Simon Hooper

10 April 2022 31	Norwich City	2–0	Burnley	Norwich
14:00 BST	Lees-Melou 9', (yellow card) 25'; Pukki 86'	Report	Taylor (yellow card) 78'	Stadium: Carrow Road; Attendance: 26,361; Referee: Michael Oliver

16 April 2022 32	Manchester United	3–2	Norwich City	Manchester
15:00 BST	Ronaldo 7', 32', 76'	Report	Dowell 45+1'; Pukki 52'	Stadium: Old Trafford; Attendance: 73,381; Referee: Andrew Madley

23 April 2022 33	Norwich City	0–3	Newcastle United	Norwich
15:00 BST		Report	Joelinton 35', 41'; Saint-Maximin (yellow card) 39'; Guimarães 49', (yellow card) 52'	Stadium: Carrow Road; Attendance: 26,910; Referee: Chris Kavanagh

30 April 2022 34	Aston Villa	2–0	Norwich City	Aston
15:00 BST	Watkins 41'; Chambers (yellow card) 44'; Iroegbunam (yellow card) 61'; Ings (yellow card) 65', (goal) 90+3'; Ramsey (yellow card) 67'	Report	Aarons (yellow card) 23'	Stadium: Villa Park; Attendance: 40,290; Referee: John Brooks

8 May 2022 35	Norwich City	0–4	West Ham United	Norwich
14:00 BST	Williams (yellow card) 61'	Report	Benrahma 12', 45+3'; Bowen (yellow card) 25'; Antonio 30'; Lanzini 65' (pen.)	Stadium: Carrow Road; Attendance: 26,428; Referee: Robert Jones

11 May 2022 36	Leicester City	3–0	Norwich City	Leicester
19:45 BST	Vardy 54', 62'; Maddison 70'	Report		Stadium: King Power Stadium; Attendance: 30,892; Referee: Simon Hooper

15 May 2022 37	Wolverhampton Wanderers	1–1	Norwich City	Wolverhampton
14:00 BST	Aït-Nouri 55'	Report	Normann (yellow card) 19'; Pukki 37'; Giannoulis (yellow card) 47'; Aarons (yellow card) 79'	Stadium: Molineux Stadium; Attendance: 31,219; Referee: Tony Harrington

22 May 2022 38	Norwich City	0–5	Tottenham Hotspur	Norwich
16:00 BST	Byram (yellow card) 15'; Normann (yellow card) 31'; Springett (yellow card) 74'	Report	Kulusevski 16', 64'; Kane 32'; Son 70', 75', (yellow card) 85'	Stadium: Carrow Road; Attendance: 27,022; Referee: Chris Kavanagh

=== FA Cup ===
Norwich were drawn away to Charlton Athletic in the third round.

9 January 2022 Third round	Charlton Athletic	0–1	Norwich City	Charlton
14:00 GMT	Inniss (yellow card) 22'; Purrington (yellow card) 51'; Dobson (yellow card) 69'; Gilbey (yellow card) 76'	Report	Hanley (yellow card) 76'; Rashica 79'; Pukki (yellow card) 90+3'; Sørensen (yellow card) 90+5'	Stadium: The Valley; Attendance: 13,835; Referee: Josh Smith

5 February 2022 Fourth round	Wolverhampton Wanderers	0–1	Norwich City	Wolverhampton
15:00 GMT	Neves (yellow card) 90+3'	Report	Hanley (yellow card) 16'; Lees-Melou (yellow card) 29'; McLean 45+1', (yellow card) 50'; Williams (yellow card) 79'; Normann (yellow card) 81'; McGovern (yellow card) 90+3'	Stadium: Molineux Stadium; Attendance: 30,736; Referee: David Coote

2 March 2022 Fifth round	Liverpool	2–1	Norwich City	Liverpool
20:15 GMT	Minamino 27', 39'; Jota (yellow card) 34'; Henderson (yellow card) 50'	Report	Byram (yellow card) 17'; Sargent (yellow card) 58'; Rupp 76'; Dowell (yellow card) 85'	Stadium: Anfield; Attendance: 52,231; Referee: Martin Atkinson

=== EFL Cup ===
Norwich entered the competition in the second round and were drawn at home against Bournemouth and Liverpool in the third round.

24 August 2021 Second round	Norwich City	6–0	Bournemouth	Norwich
19:00 BST	Tzolis 12', 66'; McLean 26'; Rupp 33'; Sargent 49', 75'; Zimmermann (yellow card) 80'	Report	Kilkenny (yellow card) 50'; Camp (yellow card) 55'	Stadium: Carrow Road; Attendance: 20,090; Referee: Charles Breakspear

21 September 2021 Third round	Norwich City	0–3	Liverpool	Norwich
19:45 BST	Lees-Melou (yellow card) 71'; Rupp (yellow card) 90'	Report	Minamino 4', 80'; Origi 50'	Stadium: Carrow Road; Attendance: 26,353; Referee: Darren England
Note: Live on Sky Sports

== Statistics ==
=== Appearances, goals and cards ===
No.	Pos	Player	Premier League			FA Cup			EFL Cup			Total			Discipline	
No.	Pos	Player	Starts	Sub	Goals	Starts	Sub	Goals	Starts	Sub	Goals	Starts	Sub	Goals	Yellow card	Red card
1	GK	(Netherlands) Tim Krul	29	0	0	2	0	0	—	—	—	31	0	0	2	0
2	DF	(England) Max Aarons	32	2	0	0	1	0	—	—	—	32	3	0	7	0
3	DF	(England) Sam Byram	11	4	0	3	0	0	—	—	—	14	4	0	4	0
4	DF	(England) Ben Gibson	28	0	0	2	0	0	1	0	0	31	0	0	4	1
5	DF	(Scotland) Grant Hanley	33	0	1	2	0	0	1	0	0	36	0	1	4	0
6	DF	(Germany) Christoph Zimmermann	2	1	0	1	0	0	1	0	0	4	1	0	1	0
7	MF	(Germany) Lukas Rupp	7	12	0	1	0	1	2	0	1	10	12	2	1	0
8	MF	(Scotland) Billy Gilmour	21	3	0	2	0	0	1	1	0	23	5	0	2	0
10	MF	(England) Kieran Dowell	11	8	1	2	1	0	1	1	0	14	10	1	1	0
11	MF	(Poland) Przemysław Płacheta	6	6	0	2	0	0	—	—	—	8	6	0	1	0
15	DF	(Turkey) Ozan Kabak	11	0	0	1	0	0	—	—	—	12	0	0	2	0
16	MF	(Norway) Mathias Normann	20	3	1	1	1	0	—	—	—	21	4	1	7	0
17	MF	(Kosovo) Milot Rashica	25	6	1	2	1	1	0	1	0	27	8	2	0	0
18	MF	(Greece) Christos Tzolis	3	11	0	1	0	0	2	0	2	6	11	2	0	0
19	MF	(Denmark) Jacob Sørensen	6	4	0	1	0	0	1	0	0	8	4	0	1	0
20	MF	(France) Pierre Lees-Melou	26	6	1	3	0	0	1	0	0	30	6	1	7	0
21	DF	(England) Brandon Williams	23	3	0	1	1	0	1	0	0	25	4	0	8	0
22	ST	(Finland) Teemu Pukki	37	0	11	1	2	0	0	1	0	38	3	11	5	0
23	MF	(Scotland) Kenny McLean	29	2	1	1	2	1	1	0	1	31	3	3	4	0
24	ST	(United States) Josh Sargent	18	8	2	1	1	0	1	0	2	20	9	4	2	0
28	GK	(England) Angus Gunn	9	0	0	—	—	—	2	0	0	11	0	0	0	0
30	DF	(Greece) Dimitris Giannoulis	14	4	0	2	0	0	1	1	0	17	5	0	2	0
33	GK	(Northern Ireland) Michael McGovern	—	—	—	1	0	0	—	—	—	1	0	0	1	0
35	ST	(Republic of Ireland) Adam Idah	6	11	1	1	1	0	1	1	0	8	13	1	0	0
40	DF	(United States) Jonathan Tomkinson	—	—	—	—	—	—	—	—	—	0	0	0	0	0
41	DF	(England) Abu Kamara	—	—	—	—	—	—	—	—	—	0	0	0	0	0
42	MF	(England) Liam Gibbs	—	—	—	—	—	—	—	—	—	0	0	0	0	0
44	DF	(Republic of Ireland) Andrew Omobamidele	4	1	1	—	—	—	2	0	0	6	1	1	1	0
45	MF	(Republic of Ireland) Tony Springett	1	2	0	—	—	—	—	—	—	1	2	0	1	0
46	ST	(England) Jonathan Rowe	0	13	0	0	2	0	—	—	—	0	15	0	0	0
58	GK	(Scotland) Jon McCracken	—	—	—	—	—	—	—	—	—	0	0	0	0	0
Players out on loan:
9	ST	(England) Jordan Hugill	—	—	—	—	—	—	—	—	—	0	0	0	0	0
14	MF	(England) Todd Cantwell	5	3	0	—	—	—	—	—	—	5	3	0	2	0
25	MF	(Cuba) Onel Hernández	—	—	—	—	—	—	—	—	—	0	0	0	0	0
26	DF	(England) Bali Mumba	0	1	0	—	—	—	2	0	0	2	1	0	0	0
31	DF	(England) Sam McCallum	—	—	—	—	—	—	—	—	—	0	0	0	0	0
43	ST	(Scotland) Tom Dickson-Peters	—	—	—	—	—	—	—	—	—	0	0	0	0	0
—	GK	(Wales) Daniel Barden	—	—	—	—	—	—	—	—	—	0	0	0	0	0
—	MF	(Luxembourg) Danel Sinani	—	—	—	—	—	—	—	—	—	0	0	0	0	0
—	ST	(England) Josh Martin	—	—	—	—	—	—	—	—	—	0	0	0	0	0
—	ST	(Switzerland) Josip Drmić	—	—	—	—	—	—	—	—	—	0	0	0	0	0
—	ST	(United States) Sebastian Soto	—	—	—	—	—	—	—	—	—	0	0	0	0	0
Players no longer at the club:
—	MF	(Wales) Louis Thompson	—	—	—	—	—	—	—	—	—	0	0	0	0	0
—	MF	(Germany) Tom Trybull	—	—	—	—	—	—	—	—	—	0	0	0	0	0
—	DF	(Switzerland) Timm Klose	—	—	—	—	—	—	—	—	—	0	0	0	0	0

=== Goalscorers ===
Rank	Pos.	Player	Premier League	FA Cup	EFL Cup	Total
1	ST	Teemu Pukki	11	0	0	11
2	ST	Josh Sargent	2	0	2	4
3	MF	Kenny McLean	1	1	1	3
4	MF	Milot Rashica	1	1	0	2
4	MF	Lukas Rupp	0	1	1	2
4	MF	Christos Tzolis	0	0	2	2
7	DF	Andrew Omobamidele	1	0	0	1
7	MF	Mathias Normann	1	0	0	1
7	DF	Grant Hanley	1	0	0	1
7	ST	Adam Idah	1	0	0	1
7	MF	Pierre Lees-Melou	1	0	0	1
7	MF	Kieran Dowell	1	0	0	1
Own goals			2	0	0	2
Totals			23	3	6	32

== See also ==
- 2021–22 in English football
- List of Norwich City F.C. seasons
