= 2023–24 Norwich City F.C. season =

122nd season in existence of Norwich City FC

Norwich City
2023–24 season
- Owner: Delia Smith; Michael Wynn-Jones; Mark Attanasio (from 24 April)
- Head coach: David Wagner
- Stadium: Carrow Road
- Championship: 6th
- Play-offs: Semi-finals
- FA Cup: Fourth round
- EFL Cup: Third round
- Top goalscorer: League: Josh Sargent (16); All: Josh Sargent (16)
- Average home league attendance: 26,077
- Biggest win: 5–0 vs Rotherham United (Championship; 9 March 2024)
- Biggest defeat: 2–6 vs Plymouth Argyle (Championship; 23 September 2023)
Home colours	Away colours	Third colours

The 2023–24 season was the 122nd season in the history of Norwich City and their second consecutive season in the Championship. In addition to the Championship, they also competed in the season's editions of the FA Cup and the EFL Cup.

== First-team squad ==
As of 13 February 2024

No.	Player	Position	Nationality	Place of birth	Date of birth (age)	Signed from	Date signed	Fee	Contract end
Goalkeepers
12	George Long	GK	(England)	Sheffield	5 November 1993 (age 33)	Millwall	17 August 2023	Free Transfer	30 June 2025
28	Angus Gunn	GK	(Scotland)	Norwich	22 January 1996 (age 30)	Southampton	1 July 2021	£5,850,000	30 June 2025
37	Daniel Barden	GK	(Wales)		2 January 2001 (age 25)	Arsenal	8 November 2018	Free Transfer	30 June 2024
51	Caleb Ansen	GK	(England)		18 September 2005 (age 21)	Academy	16 November 2022	Trainee	30 June 2026
Defenders
3	Jack Stacey	RB	(England)	Ascot	6 April 1996 (age 30)	Bournemouth	1 July 2023	Free Transfer	30 June 2026
5	Grant Hanley	CB	(Scotland)	Dumfries	20 November 1991 (age 34)	Newcastle United	30 August 2017	£3,800,000	30 June 2025
6	Ben Gibson	CB	(England)	Nunthorpe	15 January 1993 (age 33)	Burnley	1 July 2021	£9,300,000	30 June 2024
15	Sam McCallum	LB	(England)	Canterbury	2 September 2000 (age 26)	Coventry City	31 January 2020	£4,150,000	30 June 2024
21	Danny Batth	CB	(England)	Brierley Hill	21 October 1990 (age 36)	Sunderland	2 September 2023	Free Transfer	30 June 2024
24	Shane Duffy	CB	(Republic of Ireland)	Derry	1 January 1992 (age 34)	Fulham	1 July 2023	Free Transfer	30 June 2026
30	Dimitris Giannoulis	LB	(Greece)	Katerini	17 October 1995 (age 31)	(Greece) PAOK	1 July 2021	£7,500,000	30 June 2024
35	Kellen Fisher	RB	(England)		5 May 2004 (age 22)	Bromley	16 June 2023	Undisclosed	30 June 2026
Midfielders
8	Liam Gibbs	CM	(England)	Bury St Edmunds	16 December 2002 (age 23)	Ipswich Town	23 July 2021	£3,900,000	30 June 2028
17	Gabriel Sara	CM	(Brazil)	Joinville	26 June 1999 (age 27)	(Brazil) São Paulo	15 July 2022	£10,500,000	30 June 2026
19	Jacob Sørensen	DM	(Denmark)	Esbjerg	3 March 1998 (age 28)	(Denmark) Esbjerg	27 July 2020	£1,100,000	30 June 2024
23	Kenny McLean	CM	(Scotland)	Rutherglen	8 January 1992 (age 34)	(Scotland) Aberdeen	22 January 2018	£226,000	30 June 2026
26	Marcelino Núñez	CM	(Chile)	Recoleta	1 March 2000 (age 26)	(Chile) Universidad Católica	2 August 2022	£3,900,000	30 June 2026
27	Jonathan Rowe	AM	(England)		30 April 2003 (age 23)	Academy	1 January 2022	—N/a	30 June 2025
Forwards
7	Borja Sainz	RW	(Spain)	Leioa	1 February 2001 (age 25)	(Turkey) Giresunspor	30 June 2023	Free Transfer	30 June 2026
9	Josh Sargent	CF	(United States)	O'Fallon	20 February 2000 (age 26)	(Germany) Werder Bremen	9 August 2021	£9,500,000	30 June 2028
10	Ashley Barnes	CF	(England)	Bath	30 October 1989 (age 37)	Burnley	1 July 2023	Free Transfer	30 June 2025
14	Sydney van Hooijdonk	CF	(Netherlands)	Breda	6 February 2000 (age 26)	(Italy) Bologna	1 February 2024	Season-long loan	30 June 2024
16	Christian Fassnacht	RW	(Switzerland)	Zürich	11 November 1993 (age 32)	(Switzerland) Young Boys	25 July 2023	Undisclosed	30 June 2025
25	Onel Hernández	LW	(Cuba)	Morón	1 February 1993 (age 33)	(Germany) Eintracht Braunschweig	25 January 2018	£3,100,000	30 June 2025
Out on Loan
11	Adam Idah	CF	(Republic of Ireland)	Cork	11 February 2001 (age 25)	(Republic of Ireland) College Corinthians	21 July 2017	Undisclosed	30 June 2028
18	Christos Tzolis	LW	(Greece)	Thessaloniki	30 January 2002 (age 24)	(Greece) PAOK	12 August 2021	£11,000,000	30 June 2026
38	Jon McCracken	GK	(Scotland)	Glasgow	24 May 2000 (age 26)	(Scotland) Hamilton Academical	24 August 2016	Undisclosed	30 June 2024
39	Vicente Reyes	GK	(Chile)	(United States) Charleston	19 November 2003 (age 22)	(United States) Atlanta United 2	26 June 2023	Undisclosed	30 June 2026
42	Tony Springett	RW	(Republic of Ireland)	(England) London	22 September 2002 (age 24)	Academy	1 July 2021	—N/a	30 June 2025
45	Jonathan Tomkinson	CB	(United States)	Plano	11 April 2002 (age 24)	(United States) FC Dallas	1 July 2019	Free Transfer	30 June 2024
50	Jaden Warner	CB	(England)		28 October 2002 (age 24)	Academy	1 July 2021	—N/a	30 June 2025

== Transfers ==
=== In ===
Date	Pos	Player	Transferred from	Fee	Ref
16 June 2023	RB	(England) Kellen Fisher †	(England) Bromley	Undisclosed	
26 June 2023	GK	(Chile) Vicente Reyes †	(United States) Atlanta United 2	Undisclosed	
30 June 2023	RW	(Spain) Borja Sainz	(Turkey) Giresunspor	Free Transfer	
1 July 2023	CF	(England) Ashley Barnes	(England) Burnley	Free Transfer	
1 July 2023	CB	(Republic of Ireland) Shane Duffy	(England) Fulham	Free Transfer	
1 July 2023	RB	(England) Jack Stacey	(England) Bournemouth	Free Transfer	
7 July 2023	GK	(England) Ellis Craven †	(England) Rochdale	Free Transfer	
7 July 2023	CM	(England) Adian Manning †	(England) Watford	Free Transfer	
7 July 2023	CB	(England) Charlie Wilson †	(England) Everton	Free Transfer	
20 July 2023	CM	(Scotland) Gabriel Forsyth †	(Scotland) Hamilton Academical	Undisclosed	
25 July 2023	RW	(Switzerland) Christian Fassnacht	(Switzerland) Young Boys	Undisclosed	
3 August 2023	CB	(Republic of Ireland) Emmanuel Adegboyega †	(Republic of Ireland) Drogheda United	Undisclosed	
14 August 2023	LB	(Portugal) Guilherme Montóia †	(Portugal) Benfica	Free Transfer	
17 August 2023	GK	(England) George Long	(England) Millwall	Free Transfer	
26 August 2023	CM	(England) Adam Forshaw	(England) Leeds United	Free Transfer	
1 September 2023	CF	(England) Daniel Ogwuru †	(England) Manchester City	Undisclosed	
2 September 2023	CB	(England) Danny Batth	(England) Sunderland	Free Transfer	

† Signed for Under-21s

=== Out ===
Date	Pos	Player	Transferred to	Fee	Ref
30 June 2023	GK	(England) David Aziaya	Free agent	Released	
30 June 2023	GK	(Republic of Ireland) Sam Blair	(Iceland) KR	Released	
30 June 2023	RB	(England) Sam Byram	(England) Leeds United	Released	
30 June 2023	CB	(England) Charlie Campbell	Free agent	Released	
30 June 2023	AM	(England) Kieran Dowell	(Scotland) Rangers	Released	
30 June 2023	LW	(England) Josh Martin	(England) Portsmouth	Released	
30 June 2023	RW	(England) Alex Matos	(England) Chelsea	Released	
30 June 2023	GK	(Northern Ireland) Michael McGovern	(Scotland) Heart of Midlothian	Released	
30 June 2023	CF	(Finland) Teemu Pukki	(United States) Minnesota United	End of Contract	
30 June 2023	AM	(Luxembourg) Danel Sinani	(Germany) FC St. Pauli	Released	
21 July 2023	RB	(England) Bali Mumba	(England) Plymouth Argyle	Undisclosed	
10 August 2023	RB	(England) Max Aarons	(England) Bournemouth	Undisclosed	
16 August 2023	LW	(Kosovo) Milot Rashica	(Turkey) Beşiktaş	Undisclosed	
17 August 2023	GK	(Netherlands) Tim Krul	(England) Luton Town	Undisclosed	
2 September 2023	CB	(Republic of Ireland) Andrew Omobamidele	(England) Nottingham Forest	Undisclosed	
8 November 2023	CF	(Scotland) Tom Dickson-Peters	Free agent	Mutual Consent	
19 January 2023	CM	(England) Adam Forshaw	(England) Plymouth Argyle	Free Transfer	
1 February 2024	LW	(Poland) Przemysław Płacheta	(Wales) Swansea City	Free Transfer	

=== Loaned in ===
Date	Pos	Player	Loaned from	Fee	Ref
23 August 2023	DM	(Brazil) Pedro Lima †	(Brazil) Palmeiras	End of Season	
2 September 2023	CF	(South Korea) Hwang Ui-jo	(England) Nottingham Forest	9 January 2024 (Note: On 9 January, Hwang returned to Nottingham Forest early from his season-long loan.)	
1 February 2024	CF	(Netherlands) Sydney van Hooijdonk	(Italy) Bologna	End of Season	

† Signed for Under-21s

=== Loaned out ===
Date	Pos	Player	Loaned to	Date until	Ref
3 July 2023	GK	(Scotland) Jon McCracken	(Scotland) Dundee	16 August 2023 (Note: Recalled on 16 August from his season-long loan at Dundee)	
8 July 2023	GK	(Scotland) Archie Mair	(England) Gateshead	5 January 2024 (Note: On 5 January, Mair was recalled from his loan at Gateshead, and subsequently joined Morecambe on loan.)	
17 July 2023	CB	(England) Brad Hills	(England) Accrington Stanley	End of Season	
18 July 2023	CF	(England) Abu Kamara	(England) Portsmouth	End of Season	
22 July 2023	CB	(England) Lewis Shipley	(England) Accrington Stanley	End of Season	
3 August 2023	GK	(Northern Ireland) Dylan Berry	(England) Havant & Waterlooville	2 November 2023 (Note: On 2 November, Berry was recalled from his loan at Havant & Waterlooville, and subsequently joined Macclesfield on loan.)	
4 August 2023	LB	(Northern Ireland) Sean Stewart	(Northern Ireland) Cliftonville	End of Season	
6 August 2023	LW	(Greece) Christos Tzolis	(Germany) Fortuna Düsseldorf	End of Season	
2 September 2023	AM	(Scotland) Flynn Clarke	(England) Dagenham & Redbridge	13 February 2024 (Note: On 13 February, Clarke was recalled back from his season-long loan at Dagenham and subsequently joined Scunthorpe on loan.)	
6 September 2023	CB	(United States) Jonathan Tomkinson	(England) Bradford City	End of Season	
26 September 2023	CF	(Scotland) Tom Dickson-Peters	(England) Woking	24 October 2023	
29 September 2023	GK	(Scotland) Jon McCracken	(England) Accrington Stanley	14 October 2023 (Note: On 6 October, McCracken's loan at Accrington was extended for a further week.)	
14 October 2023	GK	(Chile) Vicente Reyes	(England) Braintree Town	9 November 2023	
3 November 2023	GK	(Northern Ireland) Dylan Berry	(England) Macclesfield	6 January 2024 (Note: On 5 December, Berry's loan at Macclesfield was extended by a further month.)	
6 November 2023	CF	(England) Kenny Coker	(England) Chelmsford City	4 December 2023	
6 December 2023	GK	(England) Ellis Craven	(England) Marske United	3 January 2024	
4 January 2024	CB	(Republic of Ireland) Emmanuel Adegboyega	(England) Walsall	End of Season	
5 January 2024	GK	(Scotland) Archie Mair	(England) Morecambe	End of Season	
9 January 2024	GK	(Northern Ireland) Dylan Berry	(England) Macclesfield	23 February 2024 (Note: On 23 February, Berry returned from his loan at Macclesfield early.)	
15 January 2024	RW	(Republic of Ireland) Tony Springett	(England) Northampton Town	End of Season	
22 January 2024	CB	(England) Jaden Warner	(England) Notts County	End of Season	
1 February 2024	GK	(Scotland) Jon McCracken	(Scotland) Dundee	End of Season	
1 February 2024	CF	(Republic of Ireland) Adam Idah	(Scotland) Celtic	End of Season	
13 February 2024	AM	(Scotland) Flynn Clarke	(England) Scunthorpe United	End of Season	
13 February 2024	GK	(Chile) Vicente Reyes	(England) Forest Green Rovers	20 February 2024	
14 February 2024	AM	(England) Michael Reindorf	(England) Kettering Town	End of Season	
2 March 2024	GK	(Northern Ireland) Dylan Berry	(England) Hendon	End of Season	
28 March 2024	AM	(England) Dubem Eze	(England) Warrington Town	End of Season	
3 April 2024	AM	(England) Marcel McIntosh	(England) AFC Totton	End of Season	

== Pre-season and friendlies ==
On 9 June, Norwich announced three pre-season friendlies, against Barnet, King's Lynn Town and 1. FC Kaiserslautern. A fourth was confirmed four days later, versus Darmstadt 98. On June 28, the club revealed a trip to Netherlands for a friendly against AZ. A further two matches, against Toulouse and Oympiacos was later confirmed.

Win Draw Loss Fixtures

4 July 2023 Friendly	Barnet	1–1	Norwich City	Canons Park
19:30 BST	Armstrong 38'	Report	Rowe 33'	Stadium: The Hive Stadium; Attendance: 1,687 (564 away); Referee: Fadi Mansour

8 July 2023 Friendly	King's Lynn Town	1–6	Norwich City	King's Lynn
15:00 BST	Duffy 45' (o.g.)	Report	Sargent 11'; Barnes 22', 44', 51'; Springett 27'; McCallum 43'	Stadium: The Walks; Attendance: 2,397

12 July 2023 Friendly	Darmstadt 98	0–1	Norwich City	Darmstadt, Germany
18:30 CEST; 17:30 BST		Report	Núñez 12'	Stadium: Merck-Stadion am Böllenfalltor; Attendance: 7,300; Referee: Marc-Philipp Eckermann

15 July 2023 Friendly	1. FC Kaiserslautern	0–0	Norwich City	Kaiserslautern, Germany
14:00 CEST; 13:00 BST		Report		Stadium: Fritz-Walter-Stadion; Attendance: 7,704; Referee: Nicolas Winter

19 July 2023 Friendly	AZ	1–1	Norwich City	Dirkshorn, Netherlands
18:30 CEST; 17:30 BST	van Bommel 10'	Report	Barnes 6'	Stadium: Sportpark vv Dirkshorn; Referee: Sander van der Eijk

25 July 2023 Friendly	Toulouse	0–2	Norwich City	Kufstein, Austria
16:00 CEST; 15:00 BST		Report	Fassnacht 94'; Sara 103'	Stadium: Kufstein Arena; Referee: Serdar Celik

29 July 2023 Friendly	Norwich City	2–0	Olympiacos	Norwich
15:00 BST	McLean 20'; Sargent 49'	Report		Stadium: Carrow Road; Attendance: 12,590; Referee: Sam Barrott

== Competitions ==
=== Overall record ===
Competition	First match	Last match	Starting round	Final position	Record							
Competition	First match	Last match	Starting round	Final position	Pld	W	D	L	GF	GA	GD	Win %
Championship	5 August 2023	4 May 2024	Matchday 1	6th	46	21	10	15	79	64	+15	45.65
Play-offs	12 May 2024	16 May 2024	Semi-finals	Semi-finals	2	0	1	1	0	4	−4	0.00
FA Cup	6 January 2024	28 January 2024	Third round	Fourth round	3	1	1	1	6	7	−1	33.33
EFL Cup	16 August 2023	27 September 2023	First round	Third round	3	2	0	1	3	2	+1	66.67
Total					54	24	12	18	88	77	+11	44.44

Source: Soccerway

=== Championship ===
==== League table ====
Pos	Team	Pld	W	D	L	GF	GA	GD	Pts	Promotion, qualification or relegation
3	Leeds United	46	27	9	10	81	43	+38	90	Qualified for the Championship play-offs
4	Southampton (O, P)	46	26	9	11	87	63	+24	87	Qualified for the Championship play-offs
5	West Bromwich Albion	46	21	12	13	70	47	+23	75	Qualified for the Championship play-offs
6	Norwich City	46	21	10	15	79	64	+15	73	Qualified for the Championship play-offs
7	Hull City	46	19	13	14	68	60	+8	70	
8	Middlesbrough	46	20	9	17	71	62	+9	69	
9	Coventry City	46	17	13	16	70	59	+11	64	

Source: EFL official website
Rules for classification: 1) Points; 2) Goal difference; 3) Number of goals scored; 4) Head-to-head results; 5) Wins; 6) Away goals; 7) Penalty points (sec 9.5); 8) Number of 12-point sending off offences; 9) Play-off (only if needed to determine promotion/relegation)
(O) Play-off winners; (P) Promoted

==== Results summary ====
Overall								Home						Away					
Pld	W	D	L	GF	GA	GD	Pts	W	D	L	GF	GA	GD	W	D	L	GF	GA	GD
46	21	10	15	79	64	+15	73	15	4	4	43	22	+21	6	6	11	36	42	−6

Source: Soccerway

==== Results by round ====
Round	1	2	3	4	5	6	7	8	9	10	11	12	13	14	15	16	17	18	19	20	21	22	23	24	25	26	27	28	29	30	31	32	33	34	35	36	37	38	39	40	41	42	43	44	45	46
Ground	H	A	H	A	A	H	H	A	H	A	A	H	H	A	H	A	H	A	A	H	H	A	H	A	A	H	A	H	A	H	A	H	H	A	H	A	H	A	H	A	H	A	A	H	H	A
Result	W	D	W	W	L	W	L	L	W	L	D	L	L	L	L	W	W	L	W	D	W	D	W	L	L	D	W	W	L	W	D	W	W	D	W	L	W	W	W	L	W	D	W	D	D	L
Position	8	5	3	2	5	4	5	8	7	7	7	10	14	17	17	16	13	14	13	13	11	10	8	12	13	13	11	8	8	9	9	7	7	7	7	7	6	6	6	6	6	6	6	6	5	6

Source: Soccerway
A = Away; H = Home; W = Win; D = Draw; L = Loss

==== Matches ====
The EFL Championship fixtures were released on 22 June.

Win Draw Loss Fixtures

5 August 2023 1	Norwich City	2–1	Hull City	Norwich
15:00 BST	Gibson (yellow card) 34'; Rowe 45+3'; Duffy (yellow card) 90'; Idah 90+6'	Report	Delap 17'; Greaves (yellow card) 27'; Traoré (yellow card) 30'; Vinagre (yellow card) 34'; Seri (yellow card) 41'; Ingram (yellow card) 90+5'	Stadium: Carrow Road; Attendance: 25,892; Referee: Keith Stroud

12 August 2023 2	Southampton	4–4	Norwich City	Southampton
15:00 BST	Bednarek 17', (yellow card) 77'; A. Armstrong 21' (pen.), 90+7' (pen.); Smallbone (yellow card) 40'; Edozie (yellow card) 45+1'; Tella (yellow card) 50'; Adams 57', (yellow card) 76'; Stephens (yellow card) 60'; Charles (yellow card) 76'	Report	McLean (yellow card) 1'; Sargent 7'; G. Sara 23'; Rowe 45+3'; Springett (yellow card) 77'; Fassnacht 84'; Stacey (yellow card) 90+1'; Núñez (yellow card) 90+4'	Stadium: St Mary's Stadium; Attendance: 30,113; Referee: Darren England

20 August 2023 3	Norwich City	3–1	Millwall	Norwich
12:00 BST	Rowe 25', (yellow card) 45+1'; Sargent 49'; Barnes 56'; Omobamidele (yellow card) 90+2'	Report	B. Mitchell (yellow card) 45+1'; Emakhu 90+1'	Stadium: Carrow Road; Attendance: 26,218; Referee: Tony Harrington

26 August 2023 4	Huddersfield Town	0–4	Norwich City	Huddersfield
15:00 BST	Thomas (yellow card) 22'; Koroma (yellow card) 28'; Hogg (yellow card) 61'	Report	Sargent 11'; Barnes 17' (pen.); Duffy (yellow card) 37'; Rowe 48'; Idah 84'	Stadium: Kirklees Stadium; Attendance: 18,708; Referee: Dean Whitestone

2 September 2023 5	Rotherham United	2–1	Norwich City	Rotherham
15:00 BST	Lembikisa 22'; Hugill (yellow card) 36', (goal) 40'; Rathbone (yellow card) 45+1'	Report	Stacey (yellow card) 43'; Fassnacht 50'	Stadium: New York Stadium; Attendance: 11,016; Referee: Sam Barrott

16 September 2023 6	Norwich City	1–0	Stoke City	Norwich
15:00 BST	Giannoulis (yellow card) 43'; Stacey 44'; Fassnacht (yellow card) 81'	Report	Léris (yellow card) 20'; Pearson (yellow card) 31'	Stadium: Carrow Road; Attendance: 25,816; Referee: Oliver Langford

20 September 2023 7	Norwich City	0–2	Leicester City	Norwich
20:00 BST	Duffy (yellow card) 39'; Gibson (yellow card) 42'; Barnes (yellow card) 43'	Report	McAteer (yellow card) 35' (goal) 87'; Iheanacho 45' (pen.); Vardy (yellow card) 70'; Winks (yellow card) 71'; Vestergaard (yellow card) 90'	Stadium: Carrow Road; Attendance: 26,277; Referee: Graham Scott

23 September 2023 8	Plymouth Argyle	6–2	Norwich City	Plymouth
15:00 BST	Whittaker 15', 45+3', 59'; Scarr 35', (yellow card) 68'; Azaz 45+5'; Cundle 90+7'	Report	Idah 72', 78' (pen.)	Stadium: Home Park; Attendance: 16,469; Referee: Andrew Kitchen

30 September 2023 9	Norwich City	2–0	Birmingham City	Norwich
15:00 BST	G. Sara 55', (yellow card) 65'; Rowe 60'	Report	Long (yellow card) 83'	Stadium: Carrow Road; Attendance: 26,231; Referee: Gavin Ward

4 October 2023 10	Swansea City	2–1	Norwich City	Swansea
19:45 BST	Lowe 3', (yellow card) 48'; Key (yellow card) 52'; Cullen (yellow card) 55'; Cooper (yellow card) 76'; Humphreys 83'	Report	Gibson (yellow card) 18'; G. Sara 22'; Rowe (yellow card) 61'	Stadium: Swansea.com Stadium; Attendance: 14,512; Referee: Tom Nield

7 October 2023 11	Coventry City	1–1	Norwich City	Coventry
15:00 BST	Gibson 88' (o.g.); Ayari (yellow card) 90+1'	Report	Rowe 41', (yellow card) 74'	Stadium: Coventry Building Society Arena; Attendance: 26,548; Referee: Dean Whitestone

21 October 2023 12	Norwich City	2–3	Leeds United	Norwich
15:00 BST	Duffy 4', (yellow card) 10'; G. Sara (yellow card) 34', (goal) 43'	Report	Summerville (yellow card) 19', (goal) 77', 85'; Rodon (yellow card) 45+1'; Duffy 63' (o.g.); Meslier (yellow card) 87'	Stadium: Carrow Road; Attendance: 26,758; Referee: Jon Busby

24 October 2023 13	Norwich City	1–2	Middlesbrough	Norwich
19:45 BST	G. Sara (yellow card) 76'; Rowe (yellow card) 90+5', (goal) 90+9'	Report	Greenwood 46'; Hackney (yellow card) 89'; Silvera 90+2'; Dieng (yellow card) 90+4'	Stadium: Carrow Road; Attendance: 25,585; Referee: Simon Hooper

28 October 2023 14	Sunderland	3–1	Norwich City	Sunderland
15:00 BST	Ballard (yellow card) 24'; Hume 37'; O'Nien (yellow card) 41'; Neil 45'; Clarke 80' (pen.); Pritchard (yellow card) 89'; Hemir (yellow card) 90+5'	Report	Fassnacht (yellow card) 11'; Hwang 23'; Giannoulis (yellow card) 61'; McLean (yellow card) 78'; Idah (yellow card) 90+5'	Stadium: Stadium of Light; Attendance: 39,871; Referee: Anthony Backhouse

5 November 2023 15	Norwich City	1–3	Blackburn Rovers	Norwich
12:00 GMT	Hernández (yellow card) 24'; Duffy (yellow card) 46'; Núñez (yellow card) 86'; G. Sara 90+2'	Report	Dolan 8'; Szmodics 15', 49'; Rankin-Costello (yellow card) 30'; Wharton (red card) 54'; Travis (yellow card) 90+4'	Stadium: Carrow Road; Attendance: 25,696; Referee: Josh Smith

11 November 2023 16	Cardiff City	2–3	Norwich City	Cardiff
15:00 GMT	Grant (yellow card) 12'; Bowler 39'; Robinson 43'; Wintle (yellow card) 79'	Report	Fassnacht 22'; Núñez (yellow card) 45'; Gibbs (yellow card) 77'; Wintle 82' (o.g.); Idah 84'	Stadium: Cardiff City Stadium; Attendance: 21,271; Referee: Rebecca Welch

25 November 2023 17	Norwich City	1–0	Queens Park Rangers	Norwich
15:00 GMT	Hwang 21'; G. Sara (yellow card) 77'; Fassnacht (yellow card) 84'; McLean (yellow card) 90'; Barnes (yellow card) 90+5'	Report	Colback (yellow card) 48'; Willock (yellow card) 72'; Dozzell (yellow card) 80'; Cook (yellow card) 90+3'	Stadium: Carrow Road; Attendance: 25,650; Referee: Stephen Martin

28 November 2023 18	Watford	3–2	Norwich City	Watford
20:00 GMT	Livermore (yellow card) 18'; Koné 30'; Rajović 33'; Asprilla 77'	Report	Batth 3'; Hwang 12'; Stacey (yellow card) 35'; Duffy (yellow card) 64'; Giannoulis (yellow card) 90+4'; Sainz (yellow card) 90+5'	Stadium: Vicarage Road; Attendance: 16,714; Referee: Simon Hooper

3 December 2023 19	Bristol City	1–2	Norwich City	Bristol
13:30 GMT	Knight 34'; Tanner (yellow card) 72'	Report	Duffy (yellow card) 26'; Tanner 59' (o.g.); Idah 90+5'	Stadium: Ashton Gate; Attendance: 20,424; Referee: Gavin Ward

9 December 2023 20	Norwich City	0–0	Preston North End	Norwich
15:00 GMT		Report	Evans (yellow card) 76'; Storey (yellow card) 79'	Stadium: Carrow Road; Attendance: 25,761; Referee: Oliver Langford

13 December 2023 21	Norwich City	3–1	Sheffield Wednesday	Norwich
19:45 GMT	Sainz 7'; Fisher (yellow card) 30'; Barnes 48'; Rowe 72'	Report	Cadamarteri 32'; Palmer (yellow card) 42'	Stadium: Carrow Road; Attendance: 25,521; Referee: Leigh Doughty

16 December 2023 22	Ipswich Town	2–2	Norwich City	Ipswich
12:30 GMT	Broadhead 34'; Burns 60', (yellow card) 77'; Woolfenden (yellow card) 90+6'	Report	Rowe 40', 49'	Stadium: Portman Road; Attendance: 29,611; Referee: Josh Smith

23 December 2023 23	Norwich City	2–0	Huddersfield Town	Norwich
15:00 GMT	McCallum 47'; Duffy (yellow card) 68'; Sainz 73'	Report	Rudoni (yellow card) 45+2'	Stadium: Carrow Road; Attendance: 26,067; Referee: Thomas Kirk

26 December 2023 24	West Bromwich Albion	1–0	Norwich City	West Bromwich
15:00 GMT	Thomas-Asante 50'	Report	Sainz (yellow card) 30' (yellow-red card) 33'	Stadium: The Hawthorns; Attendance: 25,086; Referee: James Bell

29 December 2023 25	Millwall	1–0	Norwich City	Bermondsey
19:45 GMT	Bradshaw 18'; Cooper (yellow card) 61'; Honeyman (yellow card) 81'; Saville (red card) 88'; Watmore (yellow card) 90+2'; Leonard (yellow card) 90+2'	Report	Barnes (yellow card) 60'; McLean (yellow card) 75'; Sargent (yellow card) 81'; Idah (yellow card) 90+3'; Núñez (yellow card) 90+7'	Stadium: The Den; Attendance: 17,715; Referee: Dean Whitestone

1 January 2024 26	Norwich City	1–1	Southampton	Norwich
15:00 GMT	Stacey (yellow card) 23'; McCallum (yellow card) 27'; G. Sara (yellow card) 54'; Sargent 78'; Hernández (yellow card) 87'; McLean (yellow card) 90+6'	Report	Armstrong 70'	Stadium: Carrow Road; Attendance: 26,467; Referee: Darren England

12 January 2024 27	Hull City	1–2	Norwich City	Kingston upon Hull
20:00 GMT	Tufan (yellow card) 51'; Slater (yellow card) 52'; Morton 90+1'	Report	McLean (yellow card) 23'; Giannoulis (yellow card) 34'; Rowe 36', (yellow card) 39'; Núñez (yellow card) 38'; Fassnacht 88'	Stadium: MKM Stadium; Attendance: 24,103; Referee: Andrew Kitchen
Note: Fixture was originally scheduled for 13 January but was moved for TV coverage.

20 January 2024 28	Norwich City	2–0	West Bromwich Albion	Norwich
15:00 GMT	Sargent 13'; Rowe 71'; Stacey (yellow card) 90'	Report	Bartley (yellow card) 17'; Wallace (yellow card) 79'	Stadium: Carrow Road; Attendance: 25,800; Referee: Sunny Sukhvir Gill

24 January 2024 29	Leeds United	1–0	Norwich City	Leeds
19:45 GMT	Bamford 16'; Firpo (yellow card) 69'	Report	Gibson (yellow card) 44'; Giannoulis (yellow card) 47'	Stadium: Elland Road; Attendance: 34,380; Referee: Matt Donohue
Note: Fixture was originally scheduled for 27 January but was brought forward due to the involvement of both teams in the Fourth Round of the FA Cup.

3 February 2024 30	Norwich City	2–1	Coventry City	Norwich
15:00 GMT	Núñez (yellow card) 22'; McLean (yellow card) 45'; Sargent 60'; Sainz 84'	Report	Kitching (yellow card) 36' (yellow-red card) 71'; O'Hare 48'; Thomas (yellow card) 90+7'	Stadium: Carrow Road; Attendance: 26,306; Referee: Gavin Ward

10 February 2024 31	Queens Park Rangers	2–2	Norwich City	Shepherd's Bush
15:00 GMT	Colback 27'; Frey 77'; Chair (yellow card) 79'; Clarke-Salter (yellow card) 87'	Report	Gibson (yellow card) 25'; McLean 48', (yellow card) 52'; Sargent 62'; Hanley (yellow card) 76'; McCallum (yellow card) 90+7'	Stadium: Loftus Road; Attendance: 17,831; Referee: Ben Toner

13 February 2024 32	Norwich City	4–2	Watford	Norwich
19:45 GMT	Barnes (yellow card) 17', (goal) 20'; Sargent 28', (yellow card) 30'; Sara 77'; Fassnacht 82'; Gibbs (yellow card) 88'	Report	Rajović 42'; Martins (yellow card) 45+1'; Asprilla 71'; Porteous (yellow card) 79'	Stadium: Carrow Road; Attendance: 25,325; Referee: Stuart Attwell

17 February 2024 33	Norwich City	4–1	Cardiff City	Norwich
15:00 GMT	Sargent 39', 54'; Sara 44'; Fassnacht 77'	Report	Collins 19'; R. Colwill (yellow card) 47'; Phillips (yellow card) 69'; Goutas (yellow card) 90+3'	Stadium: Carrow Road; Attendance: 25,902; Referee: Darren Bond

24 February 2024 34	Blackburn Rovers	1–1	Norwich City	Blackburn
15:00 GMT	Dolan (yellow card) 14'; Hyam 56'; Wharton (yellow card) 90+4'	Report	Núñez 22'; Fassnacht (yellow card) 79'; Gibson (yellow card) 90+4'	Stadium: Ewood Park; Attendance: 12,956; Referee: Oliver Langford

2 March 2024 35	Norwich City	1–0	Sunderland	Norwich
15:00 GMT	Giannoulis (yellow card) 76'; Sargent 81'; Sørensen (yellow card) 90'	Report	Hume (yellow card) 43'; Ekwah (yellow card) 59'; Seelt (yellow card) 90+5'	Stadium: Carrow Road; Attendance: 26,668; Referee: Thomas Kirk

6 March 2024 36	Middlesbrough	3–1	Norwich City	Middlesbrough
19:45 GMT	Forss (yellow card) 20', (goal) 37'; Latte Lath 43'; Engel 62'	Report	Barnes 17'; Sainz (red card) 30'; McLean (yellow card) 47'	Stadium: Riverside Stadium; Attendance: 23,545; Referee: Robert Madley

9 March 2024 37	Norwich City	5–0	Rotherham United	Norwich
15:00 GMT	Sara 13', 47'; Sørensen 21'; Sainz 32'; Sargent 45+1'; Gibbs (yellow card) 74'	Report		Stadium: Carrow Road; Attendance: 26,111; Referee: Charles Breakspear

16 March 2024 38	Stoke City	0–3	Norwich City	Stoke-on-Trent
15:00 GMT	Campbell (yellow card) 55'	Report	Sargent 24'; Sara 28'; Barnes 60'	Stadium: bet365 Stadium; Attendance: 21,887; Referee: Gavin Ward

29 March 2024 39	Norwich City	2–1	Plymouth Argyle	Norwich
15:00 GMT	Sargent 67'; Phillips 74' (o.g.)	Report	Whittaker 10'; Randell (yellow card) 18'; Sorinola (yellow card) 30'; Miller (yellow card) 35'; Devine (yellow card) 70'; Forshaw (yellow card) 80'; Pleguezuelo (yellow card) 82'	Stadium: Carrow Road; Attendance: 26,622; Referee: James Linington

1 April 2024 40	Leicester City	3–1	Norwich City	Leicester
12:30 BST	Dewsbury-Hall 33'; Mavididi 61'; Vestergaard (yellow card) 65'; Vardy 90+3'	Report	Sara 20'; Duffy (yellow card) 35'	Stadium: King Power Stadium; Attendance: 31,825; Referee: Darren Bond
Note: Fixture was initially scheduled for a 15:00 kickoff, but was moved for live Sky Sports broadcast.

6 April 2024 41	Norwich City	1–0	Ipswich Town	Norwich
12:30 BST	Núñez 39'	Report	Tuanzebe (yellow card) 31'	Stadium: Carrow Road; Attendance: 27,001; Referee: Matt Donohue
Note: Fixture was initially scheduled for a 15:00 kickoff, but was moved for live Sky Sports broadcast.

9 April 2024 42	Sheffield Wednesday	2–2	Norwich City	Sheffield
19:45 BST	Vaulks (yellow card) 76'; Ihiekwe 78'; Bannan (yellow card) 81'; Smith 85'	Report	Sargent 11'; Sainz 16'; Barnes (yellow card) 38'	Stadium: Hillsborough Stadium; Attendance: 28,516; Referee: Chris Kavanagh

13 April 2024 43	Preston North End	0–1	Norwich City	Preston
15:00 BST	Whatmough (yellow card) 36'; Storey (yellow card) 72'; Brady (yellow card) 80'	Report	Sainz (yellow card) 38'; Sara 86'	Stadium: Deepdale; Attendance: 16,322; Referee: Andrew Kitchen

20 April 2024 44	Norwich City	1–1	Bristol City	Norwich
15:00 BST	Sainz 58'; McLean (yellow card) 90+4'	Report	Roberts 55'; Williams (yellow card) 90+2'; Mehmeti (yellow card) 90+4'	Stadium: Carrow Road; Attendance: 26,295; Referee: Sam Barrott

27 April 2024 45	Norwich City	2–2	Swansea City	Norwich
15:00 BST	Sara 34'; Sargent 45+3'; Gunn (yellow card) 53'; McCallum (yellow card) 77'; McLean (yellow card) 90'	Report	Paterson 24', (yellow card) 45'; Grimes 53' (pen.); Cullen (yellow card) 57'	Stadium: Carrow Road; Attendance: 26,429; Referee: James Linington

4 May 2024 46	Birmingham City	1–0	Norwich City	Birmingham
12:30 BST	Paik 55'; Šunjić (yellow card) 76'; James (yellow card) 90+6'	Report		Stadium: St Andrew's; Attendance: 27,680; Referee: Oliver Langford

==== Play-offs ====
Norwich City finished 6th in the regular season and were drawn against Leeds United.

12 May 2024 Semi final - First leg	Norwich City	0–0	Leeds United	Norwich
12:00 BST	Duffy (yellow card) 51'; Giannoulis (yellow card) 54'; Fassnacht (yellow card) 66'	Report	Gnonto (yellow card) 45+1'	Stadium: Carrow Road; Attendance: 26,982; Referee: Josh Smith

16 May 2024 Semi final - Second leg	Leeds United	4–0 (4–0 agg.)	Norwich City	Leeds
20:00 BST	Gruev 7', (yellow card) 54'; Piroe 20'; Rutter 40', (yellow card) 56'; Summerville 68'	Report	Rowe (yellow card) 37'; McLean (yellow card) 90+1'	Stadium: Elland Road; Attendance: 36,384; Referee: Jarred Gillett

=== FA Cup ===
As a Championship side, Norwich entered the competition in the third round and were drawn at home to either Crewe Alexandra or Bristol Rovers.

Win Draw Loss Fixtures

6 January 2024 Third round	Norwich City	1–1	Bristol Rovers	Norwich
15:00 GMT	Barnes 12'	Report	Ward 17'	Stadium: Carrow Road; Attendance: 19,848; Referee: Lewis Smith

17 January 2024 Third round replay	Bristol Rovers	1–3	Norwich City	Horfield
19:45 GMT	McCormick 20'; Finley (yellow card) 43'	Report	Sara 53'; Idah 59' (pen.); Rowe (yellow card) 61'; McLean 87'; Barnes (yellow card) 90+7'	Stadium: Memorial Stadium; Attendance: 10,335; Referee: Andy Davies

28 January 2024 Fourth round	Liverpool	5–2	Norwich City	Liverpool
14:30 GMT	Jones 16'; Núñez 28'; Jota 53'; Van Dijk 63'; Gravenberch 90+5'	Report	Gibson 22'; Sainz 69'	Stadium: Anfield; Attendance: 57,334; Referee: Sam Barrott

=== EFL Cup ===
Norwich were drawn away to Queens Park Rangers in the first round Bristol City in the second round and Fulham in the third round.

Win Draw Loss Fixtures

16 August 2023 First round	Queens Park Rangers	0–1	Norwich City	Shepherd's Bush
19:45 BST	Field (yellow card) 24'	Report	Omobamidele (yellow card) 61'; Rowe 90+9'	Stadium: Loftus Road; Attendance: 7,813; Referee: James Linington

29 August 2023 Second round	Bristol City	0–1	Norwich City	Bristol
19:45 BST		Report	Płacheta 49'; Giannoulis (yellow card) 79'; Forshaw (yellow card) 90+1'; Barnes (yellow card) 90+5'	Stadium: Ashton Gate; Attendance: 9,408; Referee: Sam Allison

27 September 2023 Third round	Fulham	2–1	Norwich City	Fulham
19:45 BST	Carlos Vinícius 12'; Iwobi 72'; Rodrigo Muniz (yellow card) 90+1'	Report	McCallum (yellow card) 16'; Płacheta (yellow card) 45'; Sainz 75'; Warner (yellow card) 77'	Stadium: Craven Cottage; Attendance: 12,831; Referee: Craig Pawson

== Squad statistics ==
=== Appearances ===
- Italics indicate a loaned player

No.	Pos	Nat	Player	Total		Championship		FA Cup		EFL Cup		Play-offs	
No.	Pos	Nat	Player	Apps	Goals	Apps	Goals	Apps	Goals	Apps	Goals	Apps	Goals
3	DF	(England)	Jack Stacey	51	1	43+3	1	2	0	0+1	0	2	0
5	DF	(Scotland)	Grant Hanley	10	0	6+2	0	2	0	0	0	0	0
6	DF	(England)	Ben Gibson	39	1	33+2	0	2	1	0	0	2	0
7	FW	(Spain)	Borja Sainz	40	8	26+8	6	1+2	1	0+1	1	1+1	0
8	MF	(England)	Liam Gibbs	27	0	4+18	0	1+1	0	3	0	0	0
9	FW	(United States)	Josh Sargent	31	16	24+2	16	1+1	0	0+1	0	2	0
10	FW	(England)	Ashley Barnes	40	7	29+5	6	2+1	1	0+2	0	1	0
12	GK	(England)	George Long	12	0	6+1	0	3	0	2	0	0	0
14	FW	(Netherlands)	Sydney van Hooijdonk	12	0	0+10	0	0	0	0	0	0+2	0
15	DF	(England)	Sam McCallum	34	1	16+11	1	2	0	2+1	0	0+2	0
16	MF	(Switzerland)	Christian Fassnacht	47	6	19+21	6	1+2	0	1+1	0	0+2	0
17	MF	(Brazil)	Gabriel Sara	53	14	46	13	2	1	1+2	0	2	0
19	MF	(Denmark)	Jacob Sørensen	16	1	5+7	1	1+2	0	0	0	0+1	0
21	DF	(England)	Danny Batth	18	1	5+11	1	2	0	0	0	0	0
23	MF	(Scotland)	Kenny McLean	52	2	46	1	2	1	2	0	2	0
24	DF	(Republic of Ireland)	Shane Duffy	40	1	33+3	1	0	0	2	0	2	0
25	MF	(Cuba)	Onel Hernández	35	0	13+17	0	3	0	1+1	0	0	0
26	MF	(Chile)	Marcelino Núñez	40	2	24+10	2	1+1	0	2	0	2	0
27	FW	(England)	Jonathan Rowe	38	13	25+7	12	1+1	0	0+2	1	2	0
28	GK	(Scotland)	Angus Gunn	43	0	40	0	0	0	1	0	2	0
30	DF	(Greece)	Dimitris Giannoulis	38	0	29+4	0	1+1	0	0+1	0	2	0
35	DF	(England)	Kellen Fisher	14	0	3+6	0	1+1	0	3	0	0	0
37	GK	(Wales)	Daniel Barden	0	0	0	0	0	0	0	0	0	0
43	MF	(England)	Finley Welch	1	0	0+1	0	0	0	0	0	0	0
44	FW	(England)	Ken Aboh	1	0	0+1	0	0	0	0	0	0	0
48	DF	(South Africa)	Waylon Renecke	0	0	0	0	0	0	0	0	0	0
49	DF	(Portugal)	Guilherme Montóia	0	0	0	0	0	0	0	0	0	0
51	GK	(England)	Caleb Ansen	0	0	0	0	0	0	0	0	0	0
Out on loan:
11	FW	(Republic of Ireland)	Adam Idah	34	7	10+18	6	1+2	1	2+1	0	0	0
18	MF	(Greece)	Christos Tzolis	0	0	0	0	0	0	0	0	0	0
38	GK	(Scotland)	Jon McCracken	0	0	0	0	0	0	0	0	0	0
39	GK	(Chile)	Vicente Reyes	0	0	0	0	0	0	0	0	0	0
42	MF	(Republic of Ireland)	Tony Springett	12	0	1+8	0	0	0	3	0	0	0
45	DF	(United States)	Jonathan Tomkinson	0	0	0	0	0	0	0	0	0	0
50	DF	(England)	Jaden Warner	3	0	2	0	0	0	1	0	0	0
—	MF	(England)	Abu Kamara	0	0	0	0	0	0	0	0	0	0
No longer at the club:
1	GK	(Netherlands)	Tim Krul	0	0	0	0	0	0	0	0	0	0
2	DF	(England)	Max Aarons	0	0	0	0	0	0	0	0	0	0
4	DF	(Republic of Ireland)	Andrew Omobamidele	4	0	0+2	0	0	0	2	0	0	0
20	MF	(Poland)	Przemysław Płacheta	19	1	3+13	0	0	0	3	1	0	0
29	MF	(England)	Adam Forshaw	9	0	2+4	0	1	0	1+1	0	0	0
31	FW	(South Korea)	Hwang Ui-jo	17	3	9+7	3	0	0	1	0	0	0
—	MF	(Kosovo)	Milot Rashica	0	0	0	0	0	0	0	0	0	0

=== Goalscorers ===
Rnk	No	Pos	Nat	Name	Championship	FA Cup	EFL Cup	Championship Play-offs	Total
1	9	FW	(United States)	Josh Sargent	16	0	0	0	16
2	17	MF	(Brazil)	Gabriel Sara	13	1	0	0	14
3	27	FW	(England)	Jonathan Rowe	12	0	1	0	13
4	11	FW	(Republic of Ireland)	Adam Idah	6	1	0	0	7
4	10	FW	(England)	Ashley Barnes	6	1	0	0	7
4	7	FW	(Spain)	Borja Sainz	5	1	1	0	7
7	16	MF	(Switzerland)	Christian Fassnacht	6	0	0	0	6
8	31	FW	(South Korea)	Hwang Ui-jo	3	0	0	0	3
9	26	MF	(Chile)	Marcelino Núñez	2	0	0	0	2
9	23	MF	(Scotland)	Kenny McLean	1	1	0	0	2
11	3	DF	(England)	Jack Stacey	1	0	0	0	1
11	24	DF	(Republic of Ireland)	Shane Duffy	1	0	0	0	1
11	21	DF	(England)	Danny Batth	1	0	0	0	1
11	15	DF	(England)	Sam McCallum	1	0	0	0	1
11	19	MF	(Denmark)	Jacob Sørensen	1	0	0	0	1
11	6	DF	(England)	Ben Gibson	0	1	0	0	1
11	20	MF	(Poland)	Przemysław Płacheta	0	0	1	0	1
Own goals					3	0	0	0	3
Total					79	6	3	0	88
