= 2015 Cal Poly Mustangs men's soccer team =

American college soccer season

2015 Cal Poly Mustangs men's soccer
- Conference: Big West Conference
- Record: 11–4–5 (5–1–4 Big West)
- Head coach: Steve Sampson (1st season)
- Assistant coaches: Shaun Harris (1st season); Ignacio Hernandez (1st season); Scott Williams (3rd season)
- Home stadium: Alex G. Spanos Stadium

2015 Big West Conference men's soccer standings
	Conf.					Overall
Team	W		L		T	W		L		T
North
No. 22UC Santa Barbara+	7	–	2	–	1	14	–	7	–	2
Cal Poly +	5	–	1	–	4	11	–	5	–	5
UC Davis	3	–	4	–	3	8	–	10	–	3
Sacramento State	3	–	6	–	1	6	–	10	–	2
South
No. 24Cal St. Fullerton‡	6	–	3	–	1	13	–	8	–	1
CSU Northridge	4	–	4	–	2	8	–	8	–	3
UC Irvine	3	–	5	–	2	5	–	11	–	4
UC Riverside	2	–	8	–	0	6	–	12	–	1
‡-Tournament champion +- Invited to the NCAA Division I Men's Soccer Championship; As of November 29, 2015; Rankings from NSCAA

The 2015 Cal Poly Mustangs men's soccer team represented the California Polytechnic State University during the 2015 NCAA Division I men's soccer season. The Mustangs were led by head coach Steve Sampson, in his first season at the helm. They played all home games at Alex G. Spanos Stadium.

== Schedule ==
Date Time, TV	Rank^{#}	Opponent^{#}	Result	Record	Site City, State
Exhibition
August 22*		Fresno Pacific	W 4–1		Spanos Stadium (357); San Luis Obispo, CA
Regular season
August 28*		UNLV	W 2–1	1–0–0	Spanos Stadium (1,125); San Luis Obispo, CA
September 3*		at Gonzaga	T 1–1 ^{2OT}	1–0–1	Luger Field (796); Spokane, WA
September 5*		vs. Seattle	W 1–0	2–0–1	Luger Field (105); Spokane, WA
September 11*		Air Force	W 1-0	3–0–1	Spanos Stadium (3,461); San Luis Obispo, CA
September 13*		at Santa Clara	L 0–1	3–1–1	Stevens Stadium (250); Santa Clara, CA
September 18*		at UCLA	L 1–4	3–2–1	Drake Stadium (1, 534); Los Angeles, CA
September 20*		College of Charleston	W 2–0	4–2–1	Spanos Stadium (307); San Luis Obispo, CA
September 20*		at Loyola Marymount	W 2–0	5–2–1	Sullivan Field (671); Los Angeles, CA
October 1		at Cal State Northridge	W 1–0	6–2–1 (1–0–0)	(551); Los Angeles, CA
October 3		at UC Irvine	T 1-1 ^{2OT}	6–2–2 (1-0-1)	Anteater Stadium (914); Irvine, CA
October 8		Cal State Fullerton	T 0–0 ^{2OT}	6–2–3 (1–0–2)	Spanos Stadium (1,971); San Luis Obispo, CA
October 10		UC Riverside	W 2–1	7–2–3 (2-0-2)	Spanos Stadium (1,496); San Luis Obispo, CA
October 14		UC Davis	L 2–3 ^{OT}	7–3–3 (2–1–2)	Aggie Field (414); Davis, CA
October 17		UC Santa Barbara; Blue-Green Rivalry	W 3–2 ^{2OT}	8–3–3 (3–1–2)	Spanos Stadium (11,075); San Luis Obispo, CA
October 21		Sacramento State	W 2–0	9–3–3 (4-1-2)	Spanos Stadium (903); San Luis Obispo, CA
October 24		at UC Santa Barbara; Blue-Green Rivalry	T 2-2 ^{2OT}	9–3–4 (4–1–3)	Harder Stadium (14,919); Santa Barbara, CA
October 28		UC Davis	T 0–0 ^{2OT}	9–3–5 (4–1–4)	Spanos Stadium (1,459); San Luis Obispo, CA
October 31		at Sacramento State	W 4–2	10–3–5 (5–1–4)	Hornet Field (563); Sacramento, CA
Big West Tournament
November 07		UC Irvine Anteaters; Big West Opening Round	W 1–0	11–3–5	Spanos Stadium (602); San Luis Obispo, CA
November 11		at Cal State Fullerton; Big West Semifinal	L 1-3	11-4-5	Titan Stadium (806); Fullerton, CA
NCAA Tournament
November 19*		at UCLA; NCAA First Round			Drake Stadium; Los Angeles, CA
*Non-conference game. ^{#}Rankings from United Soccer Coaches. (#) Tournament seedings in parentheses.
