= List of NCAA Division I men's soccer teams ranked in the 2016 Top 25 coaches poll =

2016 NCAA Division I
men's soccer
Top 25 coaches poll
←2015 | 2017→

This is a week-by-week listing of the NCAA Division I teams ranked in the 2016 Top 25 coaches poll of the National Soccer Coaches Association of America (NSCAA), the most widely recognized national collegiate soccer ranking system in the U.S. Several weeks prior to the season and each week during the playing season, the 206 Division I teams are voted on by a panel of 24 coaches from the division during a weekly conference call, with the rankings then announced early on Tuesday afternoon (Eastern Time). The poll has no bearing on the selections for the 2016 NCAA Division I Men's Soccer Championship, and the coaches association states: "The NSCAA College Rankings are an indicator of week-to-week status of qualified programs and in no way should be used as a guide or indicator of eligibility for championship selection."

First place votes received in parentheses; rv = received votes. Source =

School	Preseason	Week 1	Week 2	Week 3	Week 4	Week 5	Week 6	Week 7	Week 8	Week 9	Week 10	Week 11	Week 12	Final Poll
Stanford	1 (20)	15	24	25	23	rv	rv	16	12	9	9	8	5	1 (21)
Wake Forest	5	21	21	12	14	11	11	7	2	2	2	2	2	2 (3)
Denver	20	13	11	8	8	8	7	5	5	4	6	4	4	3
North Carolina	8	3 (3)	3 (2)	2 (3)	9	4	4	8	3	3	4	10	10	4
Clemson	3 (2)	2 (3)	2 (5)	6	7	5	5	3	8	5	3 (1)	3	3	5
Louisville	—	—	rv	rv	13	9	8	4	13	7	10	9	7	6
Maryland	4	7	5 (1)	4	1 (11)	1 (22)	1 (22)	1 (21)	1 (23)	1 (24)	1 (23)	1 (24)	1 (24)	7
Virginia Tech	—	rv	15	23	19	18	18	15	23	23	23	rv	rv	8
Indiana	15	5	4	3	4	6	6	9	7	10	8	7	6	9
Providence	—	—	—	—	—	—	—	—	—	—	25	22	rv	10
Syracuse	6	6	6	5	2 (11)	3	3	10	6	6	7	6	8	11
Washington	—	—	rv	rv	rv	16	16	22	17	16	11	14	14	12
Virginia	17	12	17	17	16	rv	rv	21	16	17	17	17	16	13
Notre Dame	9	4 (1)	1 (15)	1 (21)	3 (2)	2 (2)	2 (2)	2 (3)	4	12	16	20	15	14
Creighton	7	8	14	14	12	10	10	6	10	18	24	25	23	15
Charlotte	22	19	9	9	5	14	17	14	9	8	5	5	9	16
Albany	—	—	—	—	—	—	—	—	rv	rv	rv	rv	21	17
Butler	—	rv	19	10	10	7	9	11	19	15	18	15	11	18
UMass Lowell	—	—	—	rv	24	19	22	18	14	19	13	11	12	19
Florida Gulf Coast	rv	—	—	—	rv	15	12	12	11	20	22	21	20	20
Loyola Chicago	—	—	rv	18	17	12	14	13	15	11	14	13	17	21
SIUE	—	—	—	—	—	—	—	—	—	—	—	—	—	22
Kentucky	—	17	16	21	rv	20	15	20	18	14	12	19	18	23
Akron	2 (2)	1 (16)	10	16	15	23	23	23	22	rv	rv	rv	24	24
Michigan State	—	—	—	—	22	25	21	19	20	13	15	12	13	25
New Mexico	—	—	—	rv	21	rv	rv	rv	rv	rv	rv	rv	22	rv
UCLA	16	9	8	7	6	13	19	17	24	rv	rv	rv	rv	rv
Pacific	—	—	—	—	—	rv	rv	rv	rv	rv	rv	rv	rv	rv
South Carolina	24	rv	rv	—	—	—	rv	rv	rv	25	rv	rv	—	rv
San Diego State	—	23	13	11	11	22	13	25	rv	22	21	16	19	rv
Vermont	—	rv	23	rv	rv	rv	rv	rv	—	—	—	—	—	rv
Dartmouth	rv	rv	rv	rv	—	—	—	—	—	rv	rv	rv	rv	rv
Boston College	11	11	25	15	rv	rv	rv	rv	rv	rv	—	25	rv	rv
Wisconsin	—	—	—	—	rv	—	—	—	rv	24	20	18	25	rv
Utah Valley	rv	18	12	19	18	21	rv	rv	21	21	19	23	—	rv
Portland	—	—	—	rv	—	—	—	—	rv	rv	rv	rv	rv	rv
Coastal Carolina	21	rv	—	—	—	—	—	—	—	—	—	—	rv	rv
Rider	—	rv	rv	22	rv	—	rv	rv	rv	rv	rv	rv	rv	rv
South Florida	19	rv	rv	—	rv	rv	—	—	—	—	rv	rv	rv	—
Tulsa	rv	—	—	—	—	—	—	—	—	—	—	—	rv	—
East Tennessee State	—	—	—	—	rv	—	—	—	—	—	rv	rv	rv	—
Radford	rv	20	18	24	20	rv	rv	rv	25	rv	rv	rv	rv	—
Mercer	—	—	—	—	—	—	—	—	—	rv	—	—	rv	—
Colgate	—	rv	—	rv	rv	—	—	rv	—	—	—	—	rv	—
Buffalo	—	—	rv	rv	rv	rv	rv	—	—	—	—	—	rv	—
Loyola Maryland	—	—	—	—	—	—	—	—	—	—	—	rv	—	—
American	rv	rv	20	rv	rv	rv	rv	—	rv	rv	—	rv	—	—
Seattle U	14	16	rv	—	—	—	—	—	—	rv	rv	rv	—	—
Harvard	rv	—	—	—	—	—	—	—	—	—	rv	—	—	—
Villanova	—	—	—	—	—	—	—	—	—	rv	rv	—	—	—
North Florida	—	—	rv	rv	rv	—	—	—	—	rv	rv	—	—	—
UNC Wilmington	—	—	—	rv	—	24	20	rv	rv	—	rv	—	—	—
New Hampshire	—	—	—	—	—	rv	25	—	—	rv	rv	—	—	—
Connecticut	rv	14	rv	rv	—	—	rv	24	rv	rv	—	—	—	—
Hofstra	rv	rv	—	—	—	—	rv	rv	rv	rv	—	—	—	—
UC Santa Barbara	13	10	7	13	25	—	—	—	—	rv	—	—	—	—
Bowling Green	—	—	—	—	—	—	—	—	—	rv	—	—	—	—
West Virginia	—	—	—	—	rv	17	24	rv	—	—	—	—	—	—
Xavier	—	—	—	—	—	rv	—	rv	rv	—	—	—	—	—
Delaware	—	rv	22	rv	rv	rv	rv	—	—	—	—	—	—	—
William & Mary	—	—	—	rv	rv	—	rv	—	—	—	—	—	—	—
California	rv	22	rv	rv	rv	rv	—	—	—	—	—	—	—	—
San Diego	—	rv	—	—	—	rv	—	—	—	—	—	—	—	—
FIU	23	—	—	—	rv	—	—	—	—	—	—	—	—	—
Elon	rv	—	rv	rv	rv	—	—	—	—	—	—	—	—	—
Gonzaga	—	—	rv	20	—	—	—	—	—	—	—	—	—	—
Old Dominion	—	—	rv	rv	—	—	—	—	—	—	—	—	—	—
Brown	—	—	—	rv	—	—	—	—	—	—	—	—	—	—
Marist	—	—	—	rv	—	—	—	—	—	—	—	—	—	—
NC State	—	rv	rv	—	—	—	—	—	—	—	—	—	—	—
Temple	—	—	rv	—	—	—	—	—	—	—	—	—	—	—
Duke	—	—	rv	—	—	—	—	—	—	—	—	—	—	—
SMU	12	25	rv	—	—	—	—	—	—	—	—	—	—	—
Penn State	—	rv	rv	—	—	—	—	—	—	—	—	—	—	—
Saint Louis	—	rv	rv	—	—	—	—	—	—	—	—	—	—	—
Oregon State	—	—	rv	—	—	—	—	—	—	—	—	—	—	—
Georgetown	10	24	—	—	—	—	—	—	—	—	—	—	—	—
Ohio State	18	rv	—	—	—	—	—	—	—	—	—	—	—	—
Rutgers	25	rv	—	—	—	—	—	—	—	—	—	—	—	—
Western Michigan	—	rv	—	—	—	—	—	—	—	—	—	—	—	—
Lipscomb	—	rv	—	—	—	—	—	—	—	—	—	—	—	—
Oral Roberts	—	rv	—	—	—	—	—	—	—	—	—	—	—	—
Dayton	rv	—	—	—	—	—	—	—	—	—	—	—	—	—
Boston University	rv	—	—	—	—	—	—	—	—	—	—	—	—	—
VCU	rv	—	—	—	—	—	—	—	—	—	—	—	—	—
Cal Poly	rv	—	—	—	—	—	—	—	—	—	—	—	—	—
Santa Clara	rv	—	—	—	—	—	—	—	—	—	—	—	—	—

== See also ==
- 2016 NCAA Division I men's soccer season
