= List of NCAA Division I men's soccer teams ranked in the 2015 Top 25 coaches poll =

2015 NCAA Division I
men's soccer
Top 25 coaches poll
←2014 | 2016→

This is a week-by-week listing of the NCAA Division I teams ranked in the 2015 Top 25 coaches poll of the National Soccer Coaches Association of America (NSCAA), the most widely recognized national collegiate soccer ranking system in the U.S. Several weeks prior to the season and each week during the playing season, the 206 Division I teams are voted on by a panel of 24 coaches from the division during a weekly conference call, with the rankings then announced early on Tuesday afternoon (Eastern Time). The poll has no bearing on the selections for the 2015 NCAA Division I Men's Soccer Championship, and the coaches association states: "The NSCAA College Rankings are an indicator of week-to-week status of qualified programs and in no way should be used as a guide or indicator of eligibility for championship selection."

Weekly NSCAA ranked teams
School	August 3 (preseason)	Week 1 September 1	Week 2 September 8	Week 3 September 15	Week 4 September 22	Week 5 September 29	Week 6 October 6	Week 7 October 13	Week 7 October 20	Week 8 October 27	Week 10 November 3	Week 11 November 10	Week 12 November 17	Final December 15
Stanford	8	16	13	4	3	3	3	3	3	4	4	6	7	1
Clemson	11	9	9	14	6	5	5	4	4	3	2	2	3	2
Akron	25	—	rv	11	9	9	8	6	5	6	10	10	5	3
Syracuse	15	rv	rv	rv	rv	rv	22	16	15	12	15	13	6	4
Wake Forest	rv	20	14	7	15	6	6	5	2	2	1	1	1	5
Creighton	6	3	1	1	1	1	1	1	1	1	3	5	9	6
Maryland	13	6	4	10	11	13	25	18	20	rv	rv	rv	12	7
Georgetown	3	12	25	rv	25	16	12	10	9	7	6	3	2	8
North Carolina	5	4	3	3	2	2	2	2	6	5	5	4	4	9
Boston College	—	—	—	—	—	rv	rv	25	rv	rv	rv	—	rv	10
Notre Dame	4	5	2	2	14	7	7	7	8	14	9	9	8	11
Seattle	—	—	—	—	—	24	19	24	19	15	13	15	13	12
SMU	—	23	rv	—	—	rv	rv	21	12	9	8	7	11	13
Ohio State	rv	rv	—	—	—	—	—	rv	18	23	18	12	14	14
UC Santa Barbara	—	19	rv	rv	rv	rv	rv	14	rv	rv	rv	rv	22	15
Indiana	14	18	10	22	rv	rv	rv	rv	rv	rv	rv	22	19	16
Denver	—	rv	19	15	12	8	9	8	7	8	7	8	10	17
South Florida	rv	24	rv	—	rv	17	18	12	13	11	14	14	15	18
Virginia	2	2	5	6	4	11	10	19	21	18	17	19	18	19
Coastal Carolina	21	11	7	5	5	4	4	13	11	10	11	17	20	20
Charlotte	17	rv	rv	rv	rv	—	—	—	—	rv	rv	24	rv	21
South Carolina	—	—	—	—	—	19	15	17	22	—	22	17	21	22
UCLA	1	1	8	rv	—	—	—	rv	rv	25	19	16	25	23
FIU	—	—	—	rv	24	14	rv	rv	rv	rv	—	—	16	24
Rutgers	—	—	—	—	—	—	—	—	—	21	16	18	23	25
Kentucky	rv	rv	15	rv	—	rv	20	15	16	16	12	11	17	rv
Dartmouth	rv	—	—	—	—	—	—	—	rv	24	rv	rv	rv	rv
Elon	—	—	rv	20	8	10	13	11	10	19	21	rv	rv	rv
Tulsa	—	—	—	—	—	—	—	—	—	—	—	—	—	rv
UConn	—	—	—	—	—	—	—	—	—	—	—	—	—	rv
Dayton	—	—	—	—	—	—	—	—	—	—	—	—	—	rv
Radford	—	—	—	—	—	—	—	—	—	—	—	—	—	rv
Utah Valley	—	—	—	—	rv	25	23	—	rv	—	—	—	—	rv
American	—	rv	21	21	19	rv	—	—	—	rv	rv	rv	rv	rv
Lehigh	—	—	—	—	—	—	—	—	—	—	—	—	—	rv
Hofstra	—	rv	17	rv	18	23	14	22	24	17	rv	—	—	rv
Drake	—	—	—	—	—	—	—	—	—	—	—	—	—	rv
Santa Clara	—	—	—	—	—	—	—	—	—	—	—	—	—	rv
Cal State Fullerton	—	—	—	—	—	—	—	—	—	—	—	—	24	—
Cal Poly	—	—	—	—	—	—	—	rv	23	20	23	21	rv	—
Butler	—	—	—	—	—	rv	21	rv	rv	rv	—	rv	rv	—
California	16	rv	rv	rv	20	rv	rv	—	—	rv	24	23	—	—
Monmouth	—	—	—	—	—	—	—	—	25	22	rv	25	—	—
Old Dominion	24	rv	22	12	16	12	11	9	14	13	20	rv	—	—
Xavier	19	10	rv	—	rv	20	24	rv	—	—	25	rv	—	—
St. Francis Brooklyn	—	—	—	rv	rv	22	rv	rv	rv	rv	rv	—	—	—
Washington	10	7	6	9	10	15	17	20	17	rv	—	—	—	—
New Mexico	rv	rv	rv	17	7	21	rv	rv	rv	rv	—	—	—	—
NC State	—	—	rv	rv	rv	rv	rv	23	rv	—	—	—	—	—
Oregon State	rv	21	12	8	13	rv	16	rv	rv	—	—	—	—	—
UNC Wilmington	rv	—	—	24	22	18	rv	rv	rv	—	—	—	—	—
Temple	—	—	rv	23	17	rv	rv	—	—	—	—	—	—	—
Louisville	18	15	23	19	rv	rv	rv	—	—	—	—	—	—	—
Saint Louis	22	14	16	rv	rv	rv	—	—	—	—	—	—	—	—
Omaha	—	—	rv	rv	23	rv	—	—	—	—	—	—	—	—
Penn State	23	25	—	13	21	—	—	—	—	—	—	—	—	—
Duke	—	—	rv	16	rv	—	—	—	—	—	—	—	—	—
Michigan State	9	22	rv	rv	rv	—	—	—	—	—	—	—	—	—
Providence	7	8	18	—	rv	—	—	—	—	—	—	—	—	—
Loyola Marymount	—	—	20	18	—	—	—	—	—	—	—	—	—	—
UMBC	12	17	11	25	—	—	—	—	—	—	—	—	—	—
Bowling Green	—	rv	24	rv	—	—	—	—	—	—	—	—	—	—
UC Irvine	20	13	—	—	—	—	—	—	—	—	—	—	—	—

- rv = Receiving votes in the poll.

== See also ==
- 2015 NCAA Division I men's soccer season
- College soccer
