= Jonathan Rowe (footballer, born 2003) =

English footballer (born 2003)

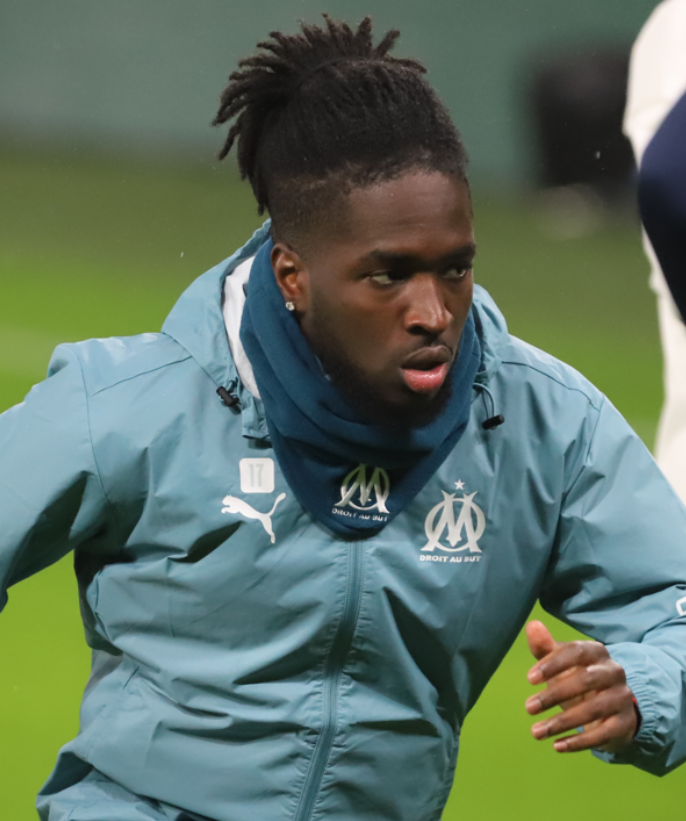
- Rowe training for Marseille in 2024

Personal information
- Full name: Jonathan David Henry Rowe
- Date of birth: 30 April 2003 (age 23)
- Place of birth: Westminster, England
- Height: 1.74 m (5 ft 9 in)
- Position: Winger

Team information
- Current team: Atalanta (on loan from Bologna)
- Number: 11

Youth career
- 2013–2014: AFC Wembley
- 2014–2021: Norwich City

Senior career*
Years	Team	Apps	(Gls)
2021–2025	Norwich City	48	(12)
2024–2025	→ Marseille (loan)	28	(3)
2025	Marseille	1	(0)
2025–	Bologna	29	(3)
2026–	→ Atalanta (loan)	8	(0)

International career^{‡}
2023–2025	England U21	10	(3)
Medal record
Men's football
Representing England
UEFA European Under-21 Championship
Winner	2025 Slovakia
- * Club domestic league appearances and goals as of 16:19, 20 November 2026 (UTC) ‡ National team caps and goals as of 18:34, 26 June 2025 (UTC)

Jonathan David Henry Rowe (born 30 April 2003) is an English professional footballer who plays as a winger for Serie A club Atalanta, on loan from Serie A club Bologna.

== Club career ==
=== Norwich City ===
A youth product of Norwich City, Rowe signed his first professional contract with the club on 20 October 2021.

He was nominated for the December 2021 Premier League 2 player of the month after some impressive performances for Norwich City's Under-23s. He made his professional debut with Norwich on 28 December 2021, coming on as a late substitute in the 68th minute in a 3–0 Premier League loss to Crystal Palace.

His first-team breakthrough came at the beginning of the 2023–24 season, establishing himself through five goals in the first five games in all competitions. These impressive performances saw him awarded the EFL Young Player of the Month award for August 2023.

Rowe was awarded the Championship Goal of the Month in January for the goal he scored against Hull City on 11 January 2024.

Rowe was shortlisted for the 2024 EFL Awards for EFL Championship Young Player of the Season alongside Archie Gray and Jordan James.

=== Marseille ===
On 23 August 2024, Rowe joined Ligue 1 club Marseille on an initial season-long loan with an obligation to buy for €15 million with add-ons included. He made his debut with the club in a 2–2 draw against Reims on 25 August, and scored his first goal in a 3–2 victory over Lyon on 22 September. On 14 May 2025, it was reported that Rowe would transfer permanently to Marseille via the obligation to buy clause in the loan contract.

On 19 August 2025, Marseille announced that they had transfer-listed Rowe and team-mate Adrien Rabiot due to what they called "unacceptable behaviour" in the dressing room after a 1–0 away defeat to Rennes. Manager Roberto De Zerbi said “it was a bar fight, in front of the sporting director, in front of the coach” and that “no teeth were broken during the fight, but it was a fight like I've never seen in all my years in football” and added that the ferocity of the confrontation shocked those present.

=== Bologna ===
On 24 August 2025, Rowe signed with Serie A club Bologna in Italy. Later that year, on 4 December, he scored his first goal for the club in a 2–1 win over Parma in the Coppa Italia.

=== Atalanta ===
On 1 September 2026, Rowe joined Serie A side Atalanta on an initial season-long loan, with both possibilities and obligations to make the transfer permanent upon the fulfillment of certain conditions.

== International career ==
Born in England, Rowe is of Jamaican descent and holds dual British-Jamaican citizenship.

In October 2023, he received his first call-up to the England under-21 national team for two 2025 UEFA European Under-21 Championship qualifiers against Serbia and Ukraine. He then made his debut for the Young Lions in the former game, on 12 October, coming on as a substitute for Liam Delap in the 69th minute; he went on to score his first goal for the team, contributing to a 9–1 win.

Rowe took part in the 2025 UEFA European Under-21 Championship, scoring from a Tino Livramento cross in England's first match of the tournament, a 3–1 win against the Czech Republic. He then featured in the final and scored the winning goal in a 3–2 win against Germany in the 92nd minute during extra time, flicking a cross from Tyler Morton into the bottom-left corner of the net.

== Career statistics ==
As of match played 8 November 2026

Appearances and goals by club, season and competition
Club	Season	League			National cup (Note: Includes FA Cup, Coupe de France, Coppa Italia)		League cup (Note: Includes EFL Cup)		Europe		Other		Total	
Club	Season	Division	Apps	Goals	Apps	Goals	Apps	Goals	Apps	Goals	Apps	Goals	Apps	Goals
Norwich City U21	2020–21	—			—		—		—		2 (Note: Appearances in EFL Trophy)	0	2	0
Norwich City	2021–22	Premier League	13	0	2	0	0	0	—		—		15	0
Norwich City	2022–23	Championship	3	0	0	0	0	0	—		—		3	0
Norwich City	2023–24	Championship	32	12	2	0	2	1	—		2 (Note: Appearances in EFL Championship play-offs)	0	38	13
Norwich City	2024–25	Championship	0	0	0	0	0	0	—		—		0	0
Norwich City	Total		48	12	4	0	2	1	—		2	0	56	13
Marseille (loan)	2024–25	Ligue 1	28	3	2	0	—		—		—		30	3
Marseille	2025–26	Ligue 1	1	0	—		—		—		—		1	0
Marseille	Total		29	3	2	0	—		—		—		31	3
Bologna	2025–26	Serie A	28	3	1	1	—		12 (Note: Appearances in UEFA Europa League)	4	2 (Note: Appearances in Supercoppa Italiana)	0	43	8
Bologna	2026–27	Serie A	1	0	0	0	—		—		—		1	0
Bologna	Total		29	3	1	1	—		12	4	2	0	44	8
Atalanta (loan)	2026–27	Serie A	8	0	0	0	–		2 (Note: Appearances in UEFA Conference League)	0	–		10	0
Career total			106	18	7	1	2	1	12	4	6	0	133	24

== Honours ==
England U21

- UEFA European Under-21 Championship: 2025

Individual

- EFL Young Player of the Month: August 2023
- Serie A Goal of the Month: May 2026
