= Curt Apsey =

American sports administrator (born 1962)

- Born: Curt Brian Apsey; 1962 (age 63–64)
- Education: California Polytechnic State University (BS)
- Occupation: Athletic director
- Spouse: Teresa Apsey
- Children: 2

Curt Brian Apsey (born 1962) is an American sports administrator who was the athletic director of Boise State University from 2015 to 2020. He joined the San Diego State athletic department in 2021.

== Education ==
Apsey graduated from California Polytechnic State University in 1988 with a Bachelor of Science degree in physical education. He was a four-year starter for the men's soccer team, setting the school's career record for most goals scored (52).

== Career ==
Apsey began his career as the assistant coach of the Cal Poly Mustangs men's soccer team. Apsey worked as assistant director of development at California State University, Bakersfield from 1990 to 1994, then as assistant director of athletics at California State University, San Bernardino.

From 1998 to 2014, Apsey worked as the as senior associate athletic director of Boise State University, including as interim athletic director for the final months of 2011. He was athletic director of Carroll College in Helena, Montana for one year, before returning to Boise State as athletic director on June 23, 2015. Apsey replaced Mark Coyle, who joined Syracuse University. Apsey's contract includes a base salary of $331,500 with additional incentives. In October 2020, it was announced that Apsey would leave his role as athletic director but remain at Boise State in a fundraising position. He was succeeded by Jeramiah Dickey.

Apsey was hired at SDSU in 2021.

== Personal life ==
Apsey and his wife, Teresa, have two daughters.

== See also ==
List of NCAA Division I athletic directors
