= Jaden Warner =

English footballer (born 2002)

Personal information
- Full name: Jaden Lemar Warner
- Date of birth: 28 October 2002 (age 24)
- Place of birth: Hillingdon, England
- Height: 1.94 m (6 ft 4 in)
- Position: Centre-back

Team information
- Current team: Farnborough
- Number: 32

Youth career
- 2014–2023: Norwich City

Senior career*
Years	Team	Apps	(Gls)
2023–2025	Norwich City	2	(0)
2024	→ Notts County (loan)	10	(0)
2025–2026	Newport County	6	(0)
2026–	Farnborough	10	(0)
- * Club domestic league appearances and goals as of 22:01, 22 October 2026 (UTC)

Jaden Lemar Warner (born 28 October 2002) is an English professional footballer who plays as a centre-back for National League South club Farnborough.

== Career ==
Warner joined Norwich City in 2014. In November 2020, he signed his first professional contract with the club, signing a deal until summer 2024. In December 2021, he signed a new contract, extending his deal until the summer of 2025. On 27 September 2023, Warner made his professional debut, playing the full match in a EFL Cup defeat to Fulham. On 5 November 2023, he made his senior league debut starting in a 3–1 loss to Blackburn Rovers. On 22 January 2024, he joined League Two side Notts County on loan until the end of the 2023-24 season.

On 31 January 2025 Warner joined EFL League Two club Newport County on a contract until the end of the 2025-26 season. He made his Newport debut on 4 March 2025 in the starting line-up for the 3-0 League Two win against Gillingham. He was released by the club at the end of the 2025–26 season.

On 8 August 2026, Warner joined National League South side, Farnborough following his departure from Newport County.

== Career statistics ==
As of match played 17 October 2026

Appearances and goals by club, season and competition
Club	Season	League			FA Cup		EFL Cup		Other		Total	
Club	Season	Division	Apps	Goals	Apps	Goals	Apps	Goals	Apps	Goals	Apps	Goals
Norwich City	2023–24	Championship	2	0	0	0	1	0	0	0	3	0
Norwich City	2024–25	Championship	0	0	0	0	1	0	—		1	0
Norwich City	Total		2	0	0	0	2	0	0	0	4	0
Notts County (loan)	2023–24	League Two	10	0	—		—		—		10	0
Newport County	2024–25	League Two	5	0	—		—		—		5	0
Newport County	2025–26	League Two	1	0	0	0	0	0	2 (Note: Appearance(s) in EFL Trophy)	0	3	0
Newport County	Total		6	0	0	0	0	0	2	0	8	0
Farnborough	2026–27	National League South	10	0	1	0	—		0	0	11	0
Career total			28	0	1	0	2	0	2	0	33	0
