= Gabriel Sara =

Brazilian footballer (born 1999)

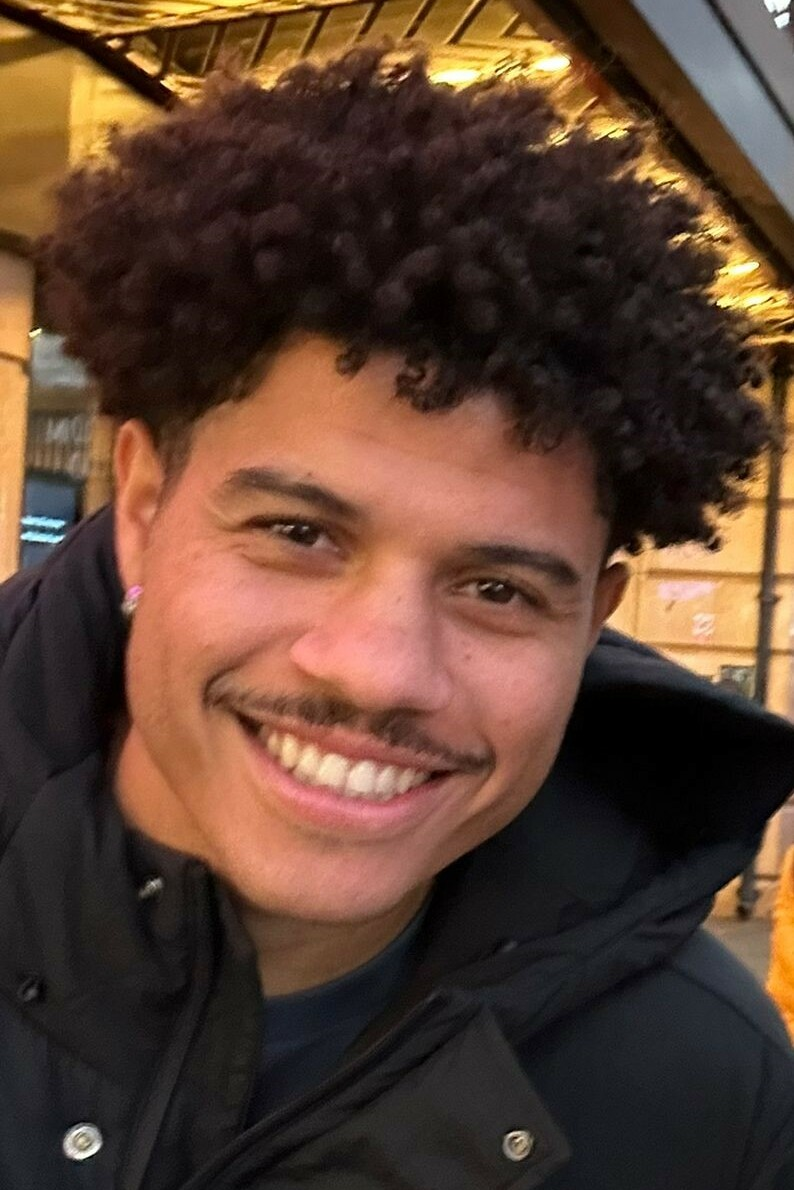
- Sara in 2023

Personal information
- Full name: Gabriel Davi Gomes Sara
- Date of birth: 26 June 1999 (age 27)
- Place of birth: Joinville, Brazil
- Height: 1.77 m (5 ft 10 in)
- Position: Midfielder

Team information
- Current team: Galatasaray
- Number: 8

Youth career
- 2013–2019: São Paulo

Senior career*
Years	Team	Apps	(Gls)
2017–2022	São Paulo	97	(14)
2022–2024	Norwich City	85	(20)
2024–	Galatasaray	68	(9)

International career^{‡}
2026–	Brazil	1	(0)
- * Club domestic league appearances and goals as of 23:27, 30 October 2026 (UTC) ‡ National team caps and goals as of 14:50, 27 March 2026 (UTC)

Gabriel Davi Gomes Sara (born 26 June 1999) is a Brazilian professional footballer who plays as a midfielder for Süper Lig club Galatasaray and the Brazil national team.

Sara previously played for English club Norwich City and for São Paulo in his native Brazil.

== Club career ==
=== São Paulo ===
Sara made his debut for São Paulo on 3 December 2017, in a 1–1 draw with Bahia, for the Brazilian Championship.

Sara departed São Paulo in 2022. He played 120 matches and scored 17 goals during his time at the club.

=== Norwich City ===
On 15 July 2022, EFL Championship club Norwich City agreed a £6 million transfer fee plus add-ons with São Paulo for Sara, with the player committing to a contract until 2026. Sara made his debut for Norwich on 6 August 2022, coming on as a substitute for the injured Max Aarons in a 1–1 draw with Wigan Athletic. Sara scored his first goal for Norwich in a 3–2 loss to Preston North End, and scored again three weeks later in a 3–1 win against Stoke City at Carrow Road.

Sara would score again in Norwich's 3–1 win over Hull City on 14 February 2023, before netting in back-to-back games in the Canaries' 2–0 win over Cardiff City, and scoring the winner in a 3–2 victory away to play-off chasing Millwall. He won the Barry Butler memorial trophy for NCFCs player of the season in 2023.

A goal and two assists across the first month of the 2023–24 season saw Sara named EFL Championship Player of the Month award for August. Later in the season, Sara proved a crucial part of Norwich city's bid for a play off spot, scoring a vital goal against Preston late on. In April 2024 at the EFL Awards, Sara was named in the EFL Championship Team of the Season.

=== Galatasaray ===
On 4 August 2024, it was announced that Sara had signed a five-year contract with Turkish club Galatasaray. He announced that he will wear jersey number 20. A month later, on 14 September, he recorded his first goal and assist in a 5–0 victory over Çaykur Rizespor. A week later, on 21 September, he netted the third goal in a 3–1 away win over Fenerbahçe in The Intercontinental Derby. He scored his first UEFA Champions League goal, as well as providing an assist, in a 5–2 victory over Juventus on 17 February 2026.

== International career ==
In March 2026, Sara was called up to the Brazil national team for a set of friendly matches.

== Personal life ==
Sara is married to Maria Clara Montemór. The couple has one child, a daughter named Nala, who was born in England on August 30, 2024.

== Career statistics ==
=== Club ===
As of match played 30 October 2026

Appearances and goals by club, season and competition
Club	Season	League			State league (Note: Includes Campeonato Paulista)		National cup (Note: Includes Copa do Brasil, FA Cup, Turkish Cup)		League cup (Note: Includes EFL Cup)		Continental		Other		Total	
Club	Season	Division	Apps	Goals	Apps	Goals	Apps	Goals	Apps	Goals	Apps	Goals	Apps	Goals	Apps	Goals
São Paulo	2017	Série A	1	0	0	0	0	0	—		0	0	—		1	0
São Paulo	2019	Série A	6	0	0	0	0	0	—		0	0	—		6	0
São Paulo	2020	Série A	33	5	1	0	6	0	—		4 (Note: Two appearances in Copa Libertadores, two appearances and one goal in Copa Sudamericana)	1	—		37	6
São Paulo	2021	Série A	36	4	9	4	4	2	—		5 (Note: Appearances in Copa Libertadores)	0	—		54	10
São Paulo	2022	Série A	1	0	10	1	2	0	—		2 (Note: Appearances in Copa Sudamericana)	0	—		15	1
São Paulo	Total		77	9	20	5	12	2	–		11	1	—		120	17
Norwich City	2022–23	Championship	40	7	—		1	0	2	0	—		—		43	7
Norwich City	2023–24	Championship	45	13	—		2	1	3	0	—		—		50	14
Norwich City	Total		85	20	—		3	1	5	0	—		—		93	21
Galatasaray	2024–25	Süper Lig	31	2	—		3	0	—		11 (Note: Two appearances in UEFA Champions League, nine appearances in UEFA Europa League)	0	—		45	2
Galatasaray	2025–26	Süper Lig	27	5	—		1	0	—		12 (Note: Appearances in UEFA Champions League)	1	2 (Note: Appearances in Turkish Super Cup)	0	42	6
Galatasaray	2026–27	Süper Lig	10	2	—		0	0	—		3	0	0	0	13	2
Galatasaray	Total		68	9	—		4	0	—		26	1	2	0	100	10
Career total			230	38	22	6	17	2	5	0	37	2	2	0	313	48

== Honours ==
São Paulo

- Campeonato Paulista: 2021

Galatasaray

- Süper Lig: 2024–25, 2025–26
- Turkish Cup: 2024–25

Individual

- Norwich City Player of the Season: 2022–23
- EFL Championship Player of the Month: August 2023
- EFL Championship Team of the Season: 2023–24
- PFA Team of the Year: 2023–24 Championship
- The Athletic Championship Team of the Season: 2023–24
