= Guilherme Montóia =

Portuguese association football player

Personal information
- Full name: Guilherme Manuel Serrão Montóia
- Date of birth: 14 September 2003 (age 23)
- Place of birth: Lisbon, Portugal
- Height: 1.85 m (6 ft 1 in)
- Position: Left back

Team information
- Current team: Jagiellonia Białystok
- Number: 23

Youth career
- 2010–2023: Benfica
- 2023–2024: Norwich City

Senior career*
| Years | Team | Apps | (Gls) |
| 2023–2024 | Norwich City | 0 | (0) |
| 2024–2026 | Estrela Amadora | 22 | (0) |
| 2026– | Jagiellonia Białystok | 21 | (1) |

International career
| 2018 | Portugal U15 | 4 | (0) |
| 2018–2019 | Portugal U16 | 11 | (0) |
| 2020 | Portugal U17 | 4 | (0) |
| 2022–2023 | Portugal U20 | 5 | (0) |
- * Club domestic league appearances and goals as of 18:48, 20 September 2026 (UTC)

Guilherme Manuel Serrão Montóia (born 14 September 2003) is a Portuguese professional footballer who plays as a left back for Polish Ekstraklasa club Jagiellonia Białystok.

== Club career ==
Born in Lisbon, Montóia joined the youth team of local Benfica in 2010 and remained there until June 2023. In his final season, as a 19-year-old with the under-23 team, he played 29 games and scored twice.

On 14 August 2023, Montóia signed for Norwich City in England, on a two-year contract with the option of a third. He featured on the substitutes' bench in the EFL Championship under manager David Wagner, and was released by mutual consent in August 2024 due to new signings in his position.

Montóia returned to his home country and signed for Estrela da Amadora for two years on 20 October 2024. He made his professional debut on 23 November, starting in a 7–0 loss away to Benfica in the fourth round of the Taça de Portugal.

On 23 January 2026, Montóia moved abroad again, signing for Jagiellonia Białystok, who were third in Poland's Ekstraklasa. He joined on a contract until June 2029, with the option of one more year.

== International career ==
Montóia represented Portugal between under-15 and under-20 level.
