= Cal Poly Mustangs men's soccer =

American college soccer team

- Founded: 1967; 59 years ago
- University: California Polytechnic State University at San Luis Obispo
- Head coach: Oige Kennedy
- Conference: Pac-12
- Location: San Luis Obispo, California, US
- Stadium: Mustang Memorial Field Presented by Dignity Health French Hospital Medical Center (capacity: 11,075)
- Nickname: Mustangs
- Colors: Poly green, copper gold, and stadium gold
Home	Away

NCAA tournament Semifinals
- 1991*

NCAA tournament appearances
- 1987, 1989, 1991*, 1993, 1995, 2008, 2015

Conference regular season championships
- 1993, 2024, 2025

The Cal Poly Mustangs men's soccer program represents the Cal Poly Mustangs of California Polytechnic State University in men's soccer at the NCAA Division I level. Starting in 2026, the Mustangs began play as men's soccer affiliates of the Pac-12 Conference under the terms of a men's soccer alliance between the Pac-12 and Cal Poly's primary home of the Big West Conference. Since becoming eligible in the mid-1990s, Cal Poly has appeared in 3 NCAA Division I men's soccer tournaments, most recently in 2015.

The Mustangs, coached by Oige Kennedy, play at Mustang Memorial Field Presented by Dignity Health French Hospital Medical Center (capacity of 11,075) on the campus of the California Polytechnic State University.

== History ==
=== 1950 to 1960: The beginning ===
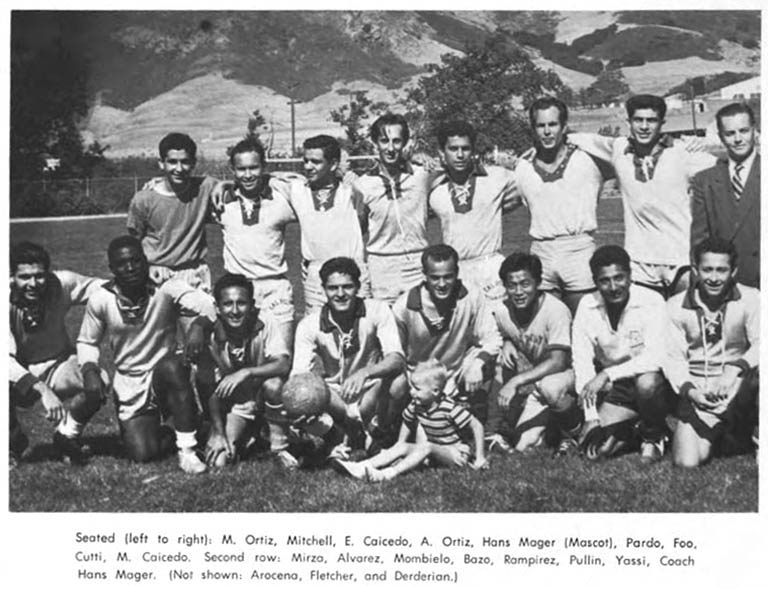
Cal Poly soccer team of 1955

On April 28, 1950, Cal Poly hosted Fresno State for a friendly as part of the Country Fair on a College Campus event, marking the first-ever time soccer had been played on campus during Poly Royal. By 1954, the campus' International Relations Club sponsored the team, which defeated UCLA in an exhibition match on campus.

In 1955, then-coach Hans Mager commented he "hope(d) to obtain some backing from the (athletic department) funds" in order to expand the team's schedule. Later in 1955, Cal Poly won the regional Southern California Championship, advancing to face San Francisco for the state title. The team took a hiatus from 1957 through 1959, returning in 1960 (playing only two matches, both losses) under the coaching of Anatol Hellman.

=== 1967-68: First intercollegiate teams and the SCCSA ===
By the 1966–1967 academic year, the Cal Poly Student Affairs Council began discussing an appropriation of a fund to allow the Mustangs to join the NCAA. In July 1967, then-athletic director Robert Mott announced the addition of soccer after the council recognized the sport on a varsity level during the spring.

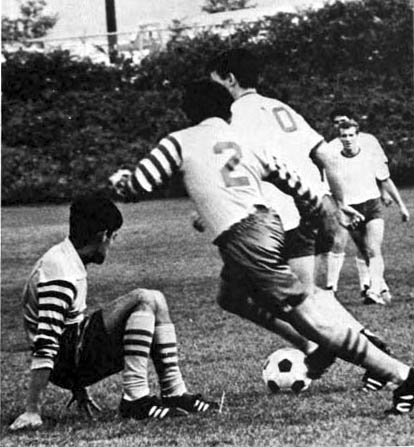
Cal Poly (striped sleeves) match in 1967, the year the team joined the NCAA

In the fall of 1967, Cal Poly (coached by Terry Ward) fielded its first intercollegiate team, going 7–2–1 while finishing second in the Southern California Collegiate Soccer Association. Erwin Hildenhagen, Richard Kibushi, Luis Mejia and Dieter Thomas earned all-conference selections.

Cal Poly enjoyed its second year in the SCCSA in the fall of 1968, again finishing in second place (behind UCLA), this time with a 7–2–2 record under coach Mike Cirovic.

The first two seasons also saw the start of the since-fabled Blue-Green Rivalry (not formally called such at the time) with UC Santa Barbara, as Cal Poly won the very first matchup, at home, 2–0, before losing on the road to the Gauchos later in 1967, 2–1. The two Central Coast rivals split a pair of matchups again in 1968. Each of the initial two intercollegiate seasons also included Cal Poly's first matchups with coastal power UCLA, resulting in a 2–2 draw in 1967 before a 1–1 stalemate in 1968, as both matches became the Bruins' only ties in the span.

Following the 1968 season, Cal Poly's Ivan Gomez, Mejia and Vincent Gondwe made the all-conference honors list.

=== 1969 to 1978: Play resumes in the SCISA ===
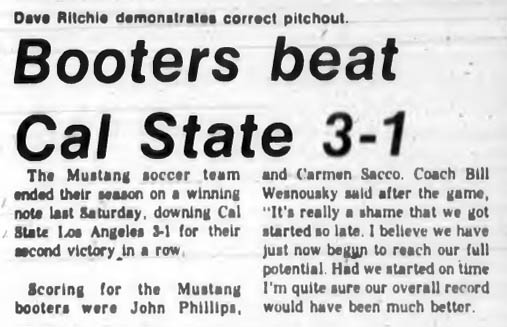
Cal Poly win v Cal State on Mustang Daily newspaper, 1970

Scheduling consistently proved to be more sporadic in immediately ensuing seasons, beginning with a 5–5 record in 1969, before the 1970 squad (coached by Bill Wesnousky) opened practice more than a week into October, leading to an abbreviated 2–4–0 season. Cal Poly didn't field a team in 1971, before Carmen Sacco assumed coaching duties from 1972 to 1974. The Mustangs' conference had a slight name change by this point, to: Southern California Intercollegiate Soccer Association.

In seasons to follow, Cal Poly was managed by Manuel Casillas (1975 and 1976), George Parry (1977, during a 4-4-1 year) and Tom Hinkle (1978). One of the standouts from this time was Jaime Saucedo, who went on to be chosen with the 84th overall pick by the L.A. Aztecs in the 1981 NASL Draft.

=== 1979 to 2005: Wolfgang Gartner era ===
Wolfgang Gartner, following a three-year career playing as a midfielder in the ASL, was appointed as Cal Poly head coach prior to the 1979 season, with the position becoming full-time in 1983.

Curt Apsey tallied 52 goals for the Mustangs from 1980 to 1983, establishing the school's career scoring record.

In 1986, Dan Campbell set the school's single-season scoring record with 21 goals. The 21-goal mark for a season broke the previous yearly record of 20 which had been set by Tom Gleason in 1982. Campbell would go on to also finish his career with 52 goals, wrapping his career up in the fall of 1988 by tying the Cal Poly all-time scoring record.

The 1993 season was perhaps the club's most successful while in Division II of the NCAA. Dan Fish was awarded the California Collegiate Athletic Association's Offensive Player of the Year award, the program's first, while Gartner was named the conference's Coach of the Year. It was Gartner's second Coach of the Year award, with the other coming in 1986. The 1993 season also featured MLS-bound Ryshiem Henderson, whom Gartner called "the fastest soccer player I have ever seen in my life."

Gartner, who, according to an LA Weekly interview, inspired local San Luis Obispo-raised DJ Wolfgang Gartner's naming, coached the Mustangs through 2005.

=== 2006 to 2014: Paul Holocher era ===
Paul Holocher, former MLS draft pick and brief USMNT-rostered attacking midfielder, was introduced as the Mustangs' new head coach on January 27, 2006.

In 2006, with then-Spanos Stadium still under construction, Cal Poly played its home soccer games at the Sports Complex, north of the baseball and softball fields, now known as the turf fields. 2007 brought the completion of the renovation and expansion of Mustang Memorial Field Presented by Dignity Health French Hospital Medical Center and the ability to host larger crowds.

Posting a record in 2008 of 11–6–6, Cal Poly placed third in the Big West and qualified for the NCAA Division I Tournament. Cal Poly managed to upset No. 11-ranked UCLA, 1–0, to advance to the second round before losing 0–3 to No. 14 UC Irvine.

After eight years as head coach, Holocher announced on August 11, 2014, that he had stepped down to move to Hawai'i and serve as the Director of Development with Maui United Soccer Club. In eight seasons, Holocher directed the Mustangs to a 72–60–25 record and an NCAA Tournament appearance, Cal Poly's second since joining Division I in 1994. Phil Ruskin, a second-year assistant coach, was promoted to be the interim head coach upon Holocher's departure, and coached the 2014 season.

=== 2015 to 2022: Steve Sampson era ===
In December 2014, Cal Poly hired former United States Men's National Soccer Team Head Coach Steve Sampson. Sampson led the US in the 1998 World Cup and also served as an assistant coach in the 1994 World Cup. He coached Santa Clara to the 1989 national championship and coached the LA Galaxy to the 2005 MLS Cup and the US Open Cup.

The Mustangs returned to the NCAA Tournament in 2015 following the program's first Big West Tournament match victory. The season saw Cal Poly peak at No. 20 in the national Top 25 Poll on October 27. During the 2015 season, midfielder Chase Minter scored on a bicycle kick at CSUN, earning TopDrawerSoccer's national college Goal of the Week award. Months after the 2015 season, Cal Poly saw three players chosen in the 2016 MLS SuperDraft, tied for the seventh-most draft choices from one school across the country for the year. Cal Poly made return trips to the conference tournament in 2019 and 2021.

Sampson, citing health reasons with the advice of his doctors, announced an immediate retirement from coaching on October 18, 2022. While lead assistant Billy McNicol was appointed to coach in Sampson's place for the remainder of the 2022 season, the university announced a pending national search to find his successor.

=== 2022 to present: Oige Kennedy takes the helm, move to Pac-12 men's soccer ===
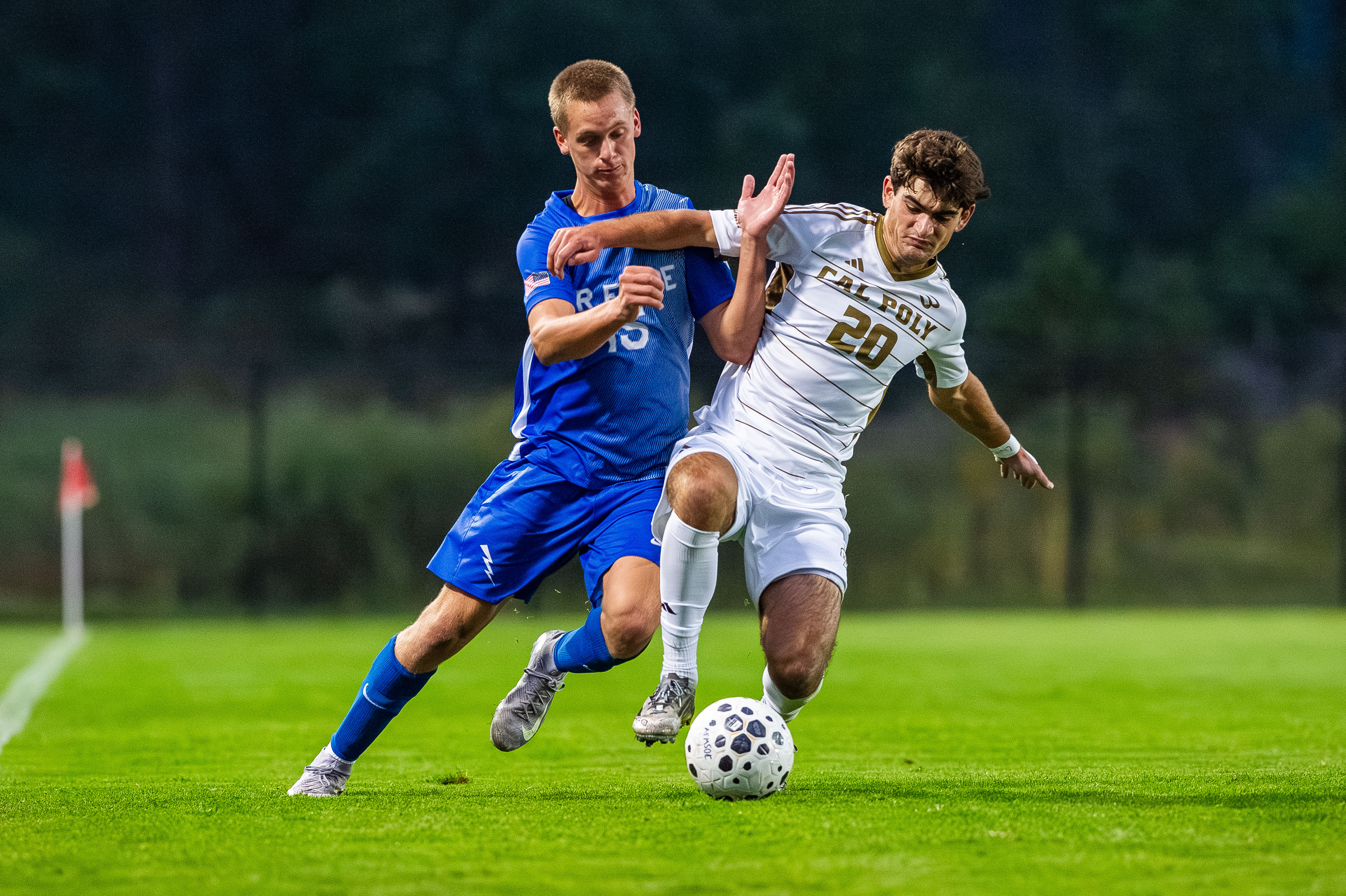
A game between Cal Poly and Air Force in 2025

Cal Poly announced lead Stanford assistant Oige Kennedy as the program's new head coach on December 9, 2022. The Mustangs won their first Big West regular-season title in 2024, finishing atop the conference table with a 16-point total.

On March 30, 2026, the Big West and Pac-12 announced a men's soccer alliance that will see four Big West men's soccer programs—Cal Poly, California Baptist (which joins the Big West in July 2026), UC Riverside, and UC San Diego—become Pac-12 men's soccer members. UC San Diego will play in the Pac-12 only in the 2026 season, as it will leave for the West Coast Conference in July 2027. The alliance, which includes an extensive cross-scheduling agreement between the two conferences, was designed to maintain both conferences' automatic bids to the NCAA tournament.

== Players ==
=== Current roster ===
As of Nov 2025

Note: Flags indicate national team as defined under FIFA eligibility rules; some limited exceptions apply. Players may hold more than one non-FIFA nationality.

No.	Pos.	Nation	Player
1	GK	USA	Nicky McCune
2	DF	USA	Joaquin Torres
3	DF	USA	Cole Aman
4	DF	USA	Parker Owens (c)
5	DF	USA	Nico Baltazar
6	MF	USA	Jackson Miller
7	MF	LES	Bakuena Ramakatsa
8	MF	USA	Diego Guerra
9	FW	USA	Sean McTague
10	MF	USA	Rylan Firouznam
11	FW	USA	Oren Stuppel
12	DF	USA	Tanner Casey
13	FW	USA	Finn Linas

No.	Pos.	Nation	Player
14	FW	USA	Roman Anast
15	DF	USA	Jake Oetinger
16	DF	USA	Michael Vick
17	MF	USA	Nalu Mack
18	FW	USA	Colin Pearce
19	FW	USA	Quinn Mahoney
20	FW	USA	Jack Civitts
21	MF	USA	Jason Castro
23	FW	USA	Luke Schaefer
24	DF	USA	Charlie Hogan
25	MF	USA	Benji Jimenez
30	GK	USA	Ben Oetman
31	GK	USA	Dylan Glowaski

=== Professionals ===
Players noted below, with years at Cal Poly in parentheses, have received at least one professional cap at any professional level in any country or have earned a senior international cap.

- Junior Burgos (2009–10) has earned caps for the El Salvador national football team, C.D. FAS in El Salvador, and multiple teams in the USL and NASL. Burgos was selected with the 44th overall pick in the 2011 MLS SuperDraft.
- (United States) Dakota Collins (2011–12) has earned caps for the USL Sacramento Republic FC as well as a third-tier team in Croatia.
- Kip Colvey (2012–15) has earned caps for the New Zealand national football team, the San Jose Earthquakes and Colorado Rapids. Colvey was selected with the 49th overall pick in the 2016 MLS SuperDraft.
- (United States) Justin Dhillon (2013–16) has earned caps for the Seattle Sounders FC of the MLS as well as LA Galaxy II and Tacoma Defiance of the USL.
- (United States) Wade Hamilton (2012–15) has earned caps with the Portland Timbers and Portland Timbers 2 Hamilton was selected with the 61st overall pick in the 2016 MLS SuperDraft.
- (United States) Clay Harty (1995–96) was drafted by the California Jaguars (scoring 17 goals between 1998 and 1999).
- (United States) Ryshiem Henderson (1990–94) played for the San Jose Clash in 1996.
- (United States) Matt LaGrassa (2011–2015) has earned caps for the Nashville SC of the MLS and several USL teams including Sacramento Republic FC, Tulsa Roughnecks FC, Reno 1868 FC and Nashville SC.
- Ariel Lassiter (2013) has earned caps for the Costa Rica national football team, currently plays for the Portland Timbers and has previously played for the Inter Miami, LA Galaxy, Houston Dynamo, GAIS of the Swedish Superettan and Alajuelense of the Costa Rican Liga FPD.
- (United States) George Malki (2010–13) has earned caps for Arizona United and Rio Grande Valley FC Toros, both of the USL league. Malki was selected with the 37th overall pick in the 2014 MLS SuperDraft.
- (United States) Patrick McLain (2007–2011) has earned caps for the MLS's Chivas USA & Chicago Fire as well as 3 USL clubs.
- (United States) Chase Minter (2012–15) has earned caps for the Sacramento Republic FC, Tulsa Roughnecks FC, Real Monarchs and Swope Park Rangers all of the USL. Minter was selected with the 21st overall pick in the 2016 MLS SuperDraft.
- (United States) Steve Palacios (2011–2013) has earned caps for the USL Portland Timbers 2
- (United States) Anton Peterlin (2006–2008) has earned caps for Plymouth Argyle F.C. and Walsall F.C. He was also signed by Everton F.C. however received no caps.
- (Canada) Mackenzie Pridham (2009–13) has earned caps for NASL Minnesota United and for four teams in the second tier USL league. Pridham was selected with the 58th overall pick in the 2014 MLS SuperDraft.
- (United States) Kody Wakasa (2012–2016) has earned caps for Phoenix Rising and FC Tucson of the USL.

== Titles ==
=== Conference ===
key

- ^{1}denotes co-champions

Conference	Championship	Titles	Winning years	Ref.
CCAA	Regular season	1	1993	
Big West	Regular season	2	2024, 2025 (Note: Title shared with UC Santa Barbara and UC Irvine.)	

== All-time seasons (year-by-year) ==
Season	Conference Record					Conf. Tourn. Finish	Overall Record				NCAA Tournaments
Season	Conference	W	L	D	Pl.	Conf. Tourn. Finish	W	L	D	Final Natl. Ranking	NCAA Tournaments
NCAA College Division (1967–1972)
Head Coach: Terry Ward
1967	SCCSA	7	2	1	2nd		7	2	1		
Head Coach: Mike Cirovic
1968	SCCSA	7	2	2	2nd		7	2	2		
1969	SCCSA				unknown		5	5	0		
Head Coach: Bill Wesnousky
1970	SCCSA				unknown		2	4	0		
1971	(hiatus)	n/a	n/a	n/a	(hiatus)		n/a	n/a	n/a		
Head Coach: Carmen Sacco
1972	SCISA				unknown		1	4	0		
NCAA Division II (1973–1993)
1973	SCISA	3	2	0	2nd		4	4	0		
1974	SCISA				unknown						
Head Coach: Manuel Casillas
1975	SCISA				unknown						
1976	SCISA				unknown						
Head Coach: George Parry
1977	SCISA				unknown		4	4	1		
Head Coach: Tom Hinkle
1978	SCISA				unknown		13	6	0		
Head Coach: Wolfgang Gartner
1979	CCAA	4	4	0	4th		6	8	0		
1980	CCAA	5	4	1	4th (T)		6	7	2		
1981	CCAA	3	2	0	3rd (T)		8	10	0		
1982	CCAA	7	2	2	3rd		11	7	2		
1983	CCAA	5	5	3	6th		9	8	3		
1984	CCAA	4	5	3	4th (T)		7	10	4		
1985	CCAA	5	3	1	3rd		8	7	3		
1986	CCAA	7	3	0	2nd (T)		13	8	0		
1987	CCAA	7	3	0	2nd (T)		13	8	0	15	NCAA 1st Round
1988	CCAA	6	2	2	3rd		9	8	3		
1989	CCAA	6	2	2	2nd		9	5	7	9	NCAA 1st Round
1990	CCAA	6	1	1	2nd		12	6	4	15	
1991	CCAA	7	2	1	2nd		14*	5	4	14	NCAA Semifinals* (* Vacated)
1992	CCAA	7	4	1	3rd		11	6	1		
1993	CCAA	8	0	2	1st		13	6	2	12	NCAA 1st Round
NCAA Division I (1994–present)
1994	None (Independent)	-	-	-	n/a		10	7	2		
1995	None (Independent)	-	-	-	n/a		11	6	1		NCAA first round
1996	MPSF	1	3	1	5th		5	12	1		
1997	MPSF	3	2	0	2nd (T)		7	10	0		
1998	MPSF	6	3	0	4th (T)		11	7	2		
1999	MPSF	1	4	1	7th		4	11	3		
2000	MPSF	3	4	0	4th		5	12	1		
2001	Big West	3	7	0	5th		4	13	1		
2002	Big West	1	9	0	6th		3	16	0		
2003	Big West	3	5	2	4th		7	8	4		
2004	Big West	3	6	1	5th		7	7	4		
2005	Big West	1	9	0	4th		6	14	0		
Head Coach: Paul Holocher
2006	Big West	3	5	1	4th		7	8	4		
2007	Big West	6	2	4	3rd		11	4	4		
Beginning with the 2008 season, the Big West Conference instituted a conference tournament to determine the winner of the NCAA automatic bid instead of awarding it to the regular-season winner.
2008	Big West	5	2	3	2nd	Semifinals	11	6	6	23	NCAA Second Round
2009	Big West	6	3	1	3rd	Semifinals	8	11	2		
2010	Big West	5	3	2	3rd	Semifinals	8	7	3		
2011	Big West	3	6	1	6th		6	9	3		
2012	Big West	6	3	1	3rd	Semifinals	11	7	1		
2013	Big West	3	5	2	6th	First round	10	9	2		
(Interim) Head Coach: Phil Ruskin
2014	Big West	3	5	2	4th		8	7	4		
Head Coach: Steve Sampson
2015	Big West	5	1	4	2nd	Semifinals	11	5	5		NCAA 1st Round
2016	Big West	3	5	2	4th		5	9	3		
2017	Big West	3	6	1	4th		7	10	1		
2018	Big West	1	5	1	8th		5	9	2		
2019	Big West	3	4	0	4th (T)	First round	7	9	1		
The 2020 season was canceled due to COVID-19.
2020	Big West				(canceled)						
2021	Big West	5	1	3	3rd	First round	7	6	4		
2022	Big West	2	3	4	9th		2	11	4		
Head Coach: Oige Kennedy
2023	Big West	3	3	3	5th	First round	5	8	4		
2024	Big West	4	1	4	1st	Semifinals	7	4	8		
2025	Big West	5	2	2	1st (T)	Semifinals	9	6	5		
2026	Pac-12										

== The Blue-Green rivalry ==
Chosen as the #1 "Greatest Rivalry In College Soccer" by CollegeSoccerNews.com, the main rival of the Cal Poly Mustangs men's soccer team is the UC Santa Barbara Gauchos men's soccer team. The rivalry is a part of the larger Blue–Green Rivalry, which encompasses all sports from the two schools. With both schools located on the Central Coast less than 100 miles apart, attendance has risen dramatically following the Gauchos' 2006 NCAA Division I Men's Soccer Championship. The crowds of these games are record-setting and are among the highest regular season games in NCAA college soccer history.

In 2011, CollegeSoccerNews.com chose the Cal Poly vs. UCSB soccer game as the No. 1 rivalry in all of college soccer.

During the 2012 season, Cal Poly swept the Gauchos, first winning 1–0 in front of a sell-out of 11,075 in San Luis Obispo. Cal Poly then completed the sweep, defeating UCSB 2–1 in overtime. Cal Poly's George Malki scored with 64 seconds remaining to send the game into overtime. Big West Conference Play of the Year, Mackenzie Pridham, then scored the game-winning game in overtime. Cal Poly students stormed the field at Harder Stadium. The game was once again broadcast on Fox Soccer Channel.

== Record attendance ==
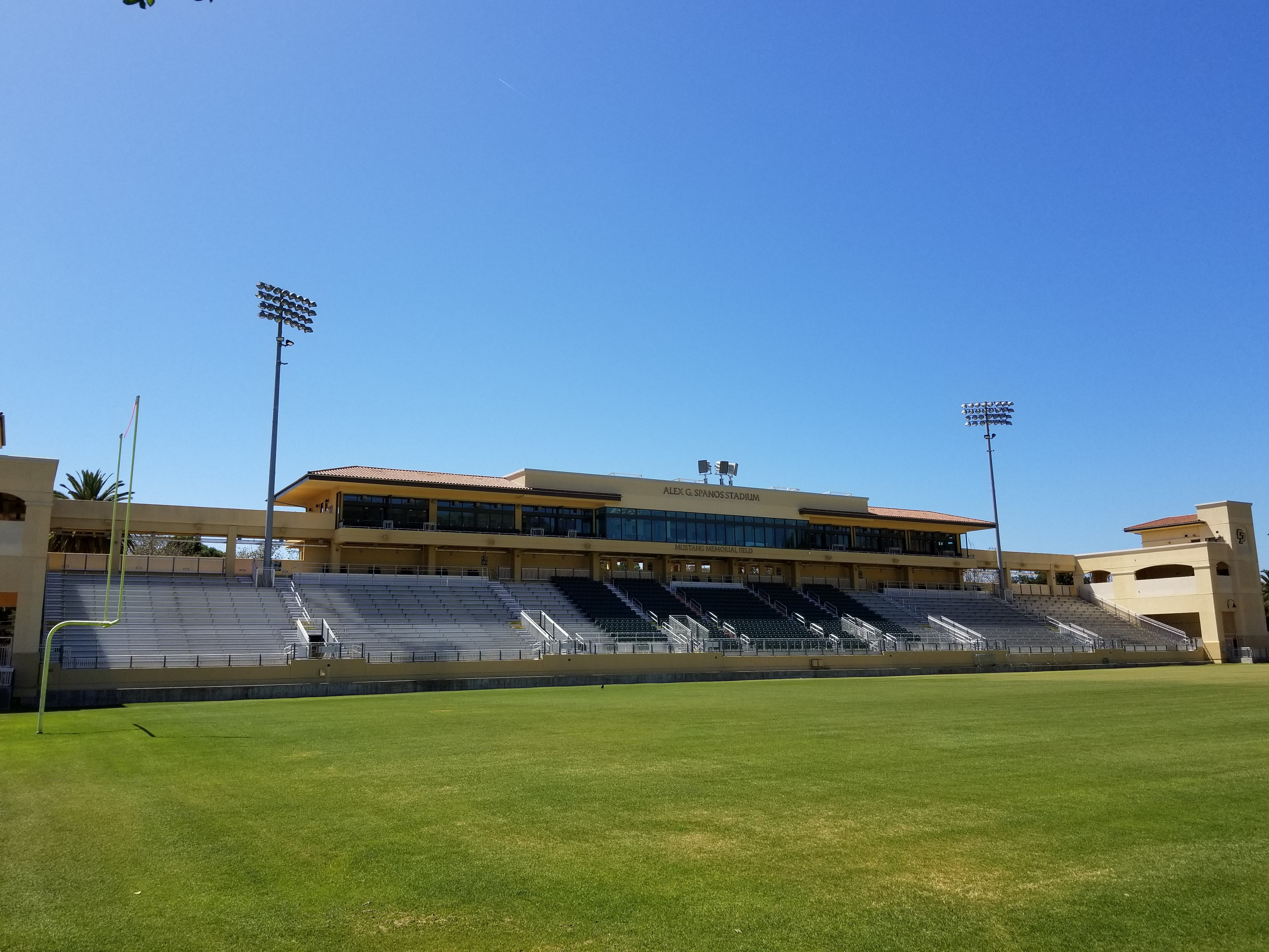
Alex G. Spanos Stadium annually hosts Cal Poly soccer matches

Cal Poly hosted a "Break the Attendance Record Night" for the 2008 edition of the Blue-Green Rivalry against 19th-ranked UCSB. The official attendance of 11,075 not only broke the school record and the conference attendance record, but it was also the second-largest on-campus, regular-season attendance in NCAA history, and the largest in over 21 years.

Attendance records have continued to be broken as Cal Poly has continually been ranked in the top 5 nationally in average home attendance.

As a result of the boom in attendance, Cal Poly has made national headlines. In 2011, then-Alex G. Spanos Stadium was named the "Men's Soccer College Venue you must check out" in a 2010 New York Times article about the growth of college soccer.

The rivalry between Cal Poly and UCSB has been called the biggest college soccer rivalry in the country by Soccer America, the "Greatest" by College Soccer News and was mentioned in a 2011 NCAA article about rivalries. In addition, the stadium was selected as the No. 1 Men's Soccer Venue to check out by the NCAA in 2011.

== NCAA tournament appearances ==
The Cal Poly Mustangs have an NCAA Division I Tournament record of 1–3 through three appearances and have never advanced past the second round. In Division II NCAA Tournament competition, Cal Poly qualified in 1987, 1989, 1991 and 1993, although the 1991 appearance was later vacated due to a rules violation.

Key

- a.e.t. – Match went to extra time
- p – Match decided by a penalty shootout after extra time

=== Division I ===
Year	Round(s)	Opponent(s)	Res.	Score
1995	First round	UCLA	L	1–2
2008	First round	UCLA	W	1–0
2008	Second round	UC Irvine	L	0–3
2015	First round	UCLA	L	0–2

=== Division II ===
Year	Round(s)	Opponent(s)	Res.	Score
1987	First round	Seattle Pacific	L	1–2
1989	First round	Cal State Hayward	L	1–2
1991*	First round	Cal State San Bernardino	W	1–0
1991*	Second round	Seattle Pacific	W	3–3 (p)
1991*	Semifinals	Sonoma State	L	1–1 (p)
1993	First round	Sonoma State	L	0–2
