= Steve Sampson =

American soccer coach (born 1957)

Personal information
- Full name: Mark Stephen Sampson
- Date of birth: January 19, 1957 (age 69)
- Place of birth: Salt Lake City, Utah, U.S.

College career
Years	Team	Apps	(Gls)
1975–1976	Foothill Owls		
1977–1978	San Jose State Spartans		

Managerial career
- 1978–1980: Awalt High School
- 1981: Foothill Owls (assistant)
- 1982–1985: UCLA Bruins (assistant)
- 1986–1990: Santa Clara Broncos
- 1993–1995: United States (assistant)
- 1995–1998: United States
- 2002–2004: Costa Rica
- 2004–2006: LA Galaxy
- 2015–2022: Cal Poly Mustangs
Medal record
Representing United States (as coach)
Third place	CONCACAF Gold Cup	1996
Runner-up	CONCACAF Gold Cup	1998
Men's Soccer

Mark Stephen Sampson (born January 19, 1957) is an American soccer coach. He is also the former head coach of both the United States men's national team and the Los Angeles Galaxy of Major League Soccer.

== Collegiate career ==
Sampson attended UCLA briefly before transferring to Foothill Community College, located in Los Altos Hills, California, in 1975. At Foothill Community he earned All-American honors while playing on the 1976 California junior college state championship team. He then transferred to San Jose State University in 1977. He graduated from San Jose State in 1979 with a minor in Spanish, which he later used as coach of the Costa Rica national team.

== Beginning coaching ==
After graduating from San Jose State, he moved to Stanford University where he earned a master's degree in education from the Stanford Graduate School of Education. While at Stanford he entered the coaching ranks with the Awalt High School boys varsity soccer team in Mountain View, California. Then, after graduating from Stanford, he served as an assistant men's soccer coach at Foothill College. In 1982, UCLA hired Sampson as an assistant men's soccer coach. In 1985, he was on staff when UCLA won the NCAA men's soccer championship.

== Santa Clara University ==
At the end of the 1985 season, Santa Clara University hired him away from UCLA to serve as their men's soccer head coach. In 1989, he achieved his greatest success as a college coach when he led Santa Clara to the NCAA Men's Soccer Championship. Santa Clara's opponent in the final was Virginia, coached by Bruce Arena, who would later succeed Sampson as head coach of the United States men's national soccer team. Santa Clara and Virginia played even through regular time and four overtimes before NCAA officials stopped the game, much to the frustration of the players and two coaches, and named Santa Clara and Virginia as co-champions. Sampson was named the 1989 NCAA Men's Soccer Coach of the Year. When he left Santa Clara, he had compiled a 64–19–19 record.

== 1994 World Cup ==
After leaving Santa Clara, Sampson became an assistant to Bora Milutinović on the United States national team in 1993 and was on the staff when the U.S. hosted the 1994 FIFA World Cup. In addition to his coaching duties, he served as the Vice President/Competition Management for the World Cup organization.

== U.S. national team coach ==
=== 1995 Copa America ===
When Milutinović resigned from the team after the World Cup, the United States Soccer Federation (USSF) named Sampson as the interim coach in April 1995. After leading the US to a surprising fourth-place finish at the Copa América 1995, including a 3–0 romp over Argentina, as well as a victory over arch-rivals Mexico in the quarterfinals, Sampson was promoted to full-time national team coach in August 1995.

=== 1998 Gold Cup ===
Sampson coached the team to a second-place finish in the 1998 Gold Cup, including a historic 1–0 victory over Brazil in the semi-final.

=== 1998 World Cup ===
The US national team had a strong showing in the 1998 World Cup qualifying rounds, finishing with an 8–6–2 record overall.

Sampson attempted to improve the team by looking for Americans playing in Europe. David Regis was the most talented of those Sampson brought in but was impacted by delays in gaining his citizenship. Others like Michael Mason and David Wagner did not pan out as Sampson tried to overcome the weaknesses of a young MLS. In a controversial move, Sampson removed then captain, John Harkes from the squad. Sampson gave a variety of reasons, from Harkes' lack of leadership, Harkes wanting a more offensive role, and behavioral issues unbecoming of a national team player. There were injuries to both of the U.S.'s primary attacking threat, Eric Wynalda and creative midfielder Tab Ramos.

The 1998 World Cup would prove more challenging. Playing the likes of Germany and Yugoslavia were significantly more difficult than in CONCACAF qualifying. Sampson changed the formation in the spring of 1998 to an unusual 3–6–1 formation in preparation for the Germany match, trying to counter the quality of the German midfield. The conservative approach almost worked but was not to be as his team conceded a goal from a corner in the first half. When Sampson changed the system in the second half his team showed promise but was thwarted by an exceptional strike by Jürgen Klinsmann. The team lost 2–0. The second match against Iran showed a spirited team but one that could not find the back of the net. The U.S. team hit the crossbar and post on five occasions en route to a 2–1 loss in their most critical match. Counter-attack goals got the best of the U.S. seeking to overcome the Germany loss and the player unrest after that match. The lone goal came from Brian McBride. After significant personnel changes for the Yugoslavia game, the team lost 1–0. Failing to win a game and finishing in last place, Sampson resigned as coach on June 29, 1998.

In February 2010, Sampson said that John Harkes was dropped from the 1998 World Cup because of an affair between Harkes and Amy Wynalda, then the wife of U.S. striker Eric Wynalda. Long rumored as the reason Harkes was dropped, Sampson finally cleared the air after Eric Wynalda confirmed the rumors during a discussion about the situation for the English National team in the run up to the 2010 World Cup in South Africa.

== Costa Rica national team ==
In 2002, the Costa Rica national team hired Sampson as its head coach. In his first international post, he helped Costa Rica win the 2003 UNCAF Nations Cup, going undefeated. Costa Rica also finished fourth in the 2003 CONCACAF Gold Cup.

In 2004, Costa Rica ranked 17 in the world, their highest ever at the time. However, after Costa Rica needed the away goals tiebreaker to get past Cuba in the second round of qualifying for the 2006 World Cup, Sampson was fired.

== Los Angeles Galaxy ==
Sampson was hired as the LA Galaxy coach on August 18, 2004, replacing Sigi Schmid. Despite an array of talent, the team was inconsistent the rest of the year and struggled for large stretches of 2005. Many of the players whom Sampson had brought into the team were absent from the Galaxy squad due to national team commitments for the US, Costa Rica, and Guatemala. As the season continued the Galaxy improved and eventually won the "double" of the U.S. Open Cup and MLS Cup, the latter as the lowest seed in the playoffs. The Galaxy failed to build on their success in the 2005 season and Sampson was fired on June 6, 2006, after Alexi Lalas, who played for Sampson on the US National Team, was hired as president.

== Cal Poly ==
Steve Sampson was hired as the head men's soccer coach at California Polytechnic State University on December 4, 2014.
