= David Wagner (soccer) =

German footballer and manager (born 1971)

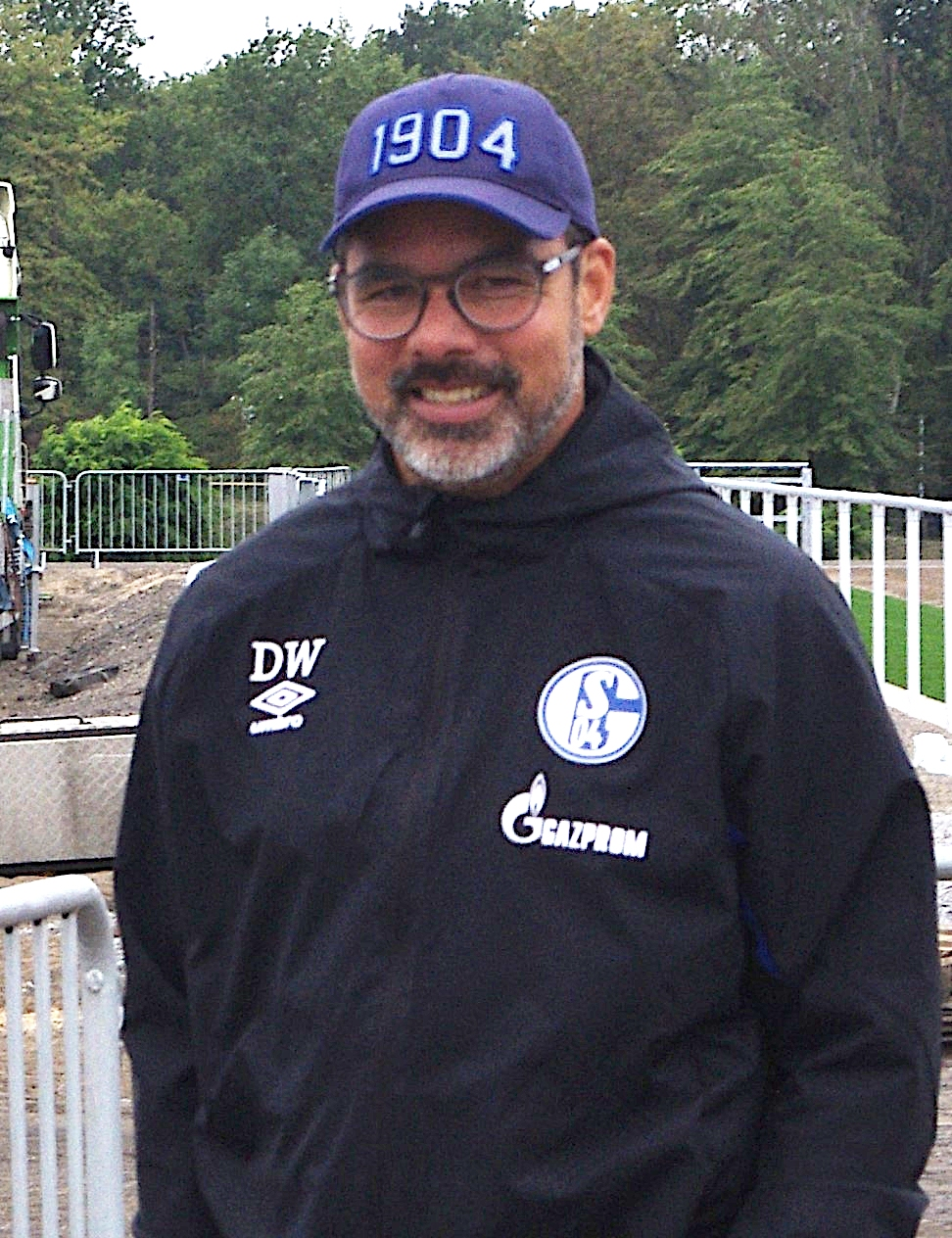
- Wagner as Schalke 04 manager in 2019

Personal information
- Full name: David Wagner
- Date of birth: 19 October 1971 (age 55)
- Place of birth: Frankfurt, West Germany
- Height: 1.80 m (5 ft 11 in)
- Position: Striker

Youth career
- SV Geinsheim

Senior career*
Years	Team	Apps	(Gls)
1990–1991	Eintracht Frankfurt	1	(0)
1991–1995	Mainz 05	94	(19)
1995–1997	Schalke 04	29	(2)
1997–1999	FC Gütersloh	49	(7)
1999	Waldhof Mannheim	5	(0)
1999–2002	Darmstadt 98	76	(21)
2002–2004	TSG Weinheim	23	(8)
2004–2006	Germania Pfungstadt	0	(0)
Total		277	(57)

International career
1992	Germany U21	1	(0)
1996–1998	United States	8	(0)

Managerial career
- 2011–2015: Borussia Dortmund II
- 2015–2019: Huddersfield Town
- 2019–2020: Schalke 04
- 2021–2022: Young Boys
- 2023–2024: Norwich City
- * Club domestic league appearances and goals

David Wagner (born 19 October 1971) is a professional football manager and former striker.

Born in Frankfurt, West Germany to a Thai father and German mother, Wagner made his professional debut with Eintracht Frankfurt in 1990 and subsequently played for various clubs in the first and second tiers of German football. He also earned eight caps for the United States, the country of his stepfather's birth, between 1996 and 1998.

From 2011 to 2015, Wagner managed Borussia Dortmund II. In November 2015, he took charge of Huddersfield Town and led them led to the Premier League via the 2017 EFL Championship play-off final. He left Huddersfield in January 2019, and then had brief spells at Bundesliga club Schalke 04 and Swiss Super League club Young Boys.

== Club career ==
As a journeyman, Wagner played primarily for Mainz 05, Darmstadt 98, FC Gütersloh, and Schalke 04. He also had short stints at Waldhof Mannheim, Eintracht Frankfurt and TSG Weinheim and Germania Pfungstadt. He enjoyed his best spell at Mainz, scoring 19 times in his four years at the club. Former teammate and lifelong friend Jürgen Klopp recalled that "he wasn't very consistent, even if he does not want to hear it ... He was a big talent, but not every day. He was a very young player when he came from Eintracht Frankfurt to Mainz, a very skilled boy, very quick, a good striker." He was part of the Schalke squad that won the 1997 UEFA Cup.

== International career ==
In the mid-1990s, Wagner was one of several German-born players called up by United States men's national soccer team coach Steve Sampson due to their ancestry, along with Thomas Dooley and Michael Mason. Wagner made his debut in a friendly 3–1 win over El Salvador in Los Angeles on 30 August 1996, in which he was substituted at half-time for Brian McBride. He made five appearances the following year and two more in 1998, all but one as a starter.

In April 1997, after Canada lost to the United States in a World Cup qualifying match in which Wagner played, the Canadian Soccer Association complained to FIFA that he should be made ineligible to play for the United States due to his appearances for Germany's youth teams. On 2 May 1997, FIFA annulled the Canadians' accusation and confirmed Wagner's eligibility; he eventually failed to make the final World Cup squad.

== Managerial career ==
=== Borussia Dortmund II ===
Following his playing career, Wagner progressed onto coaching, working mostly with his former Mainz teammate Klopp. He was appointed as Borussia Dortmund II manager with effect from 1 July 2011. He left the role on 31 October 2015, amid rumours that he was going to join Klopp's backroom staff at Liverpool.

=== Huddersfield Town ===
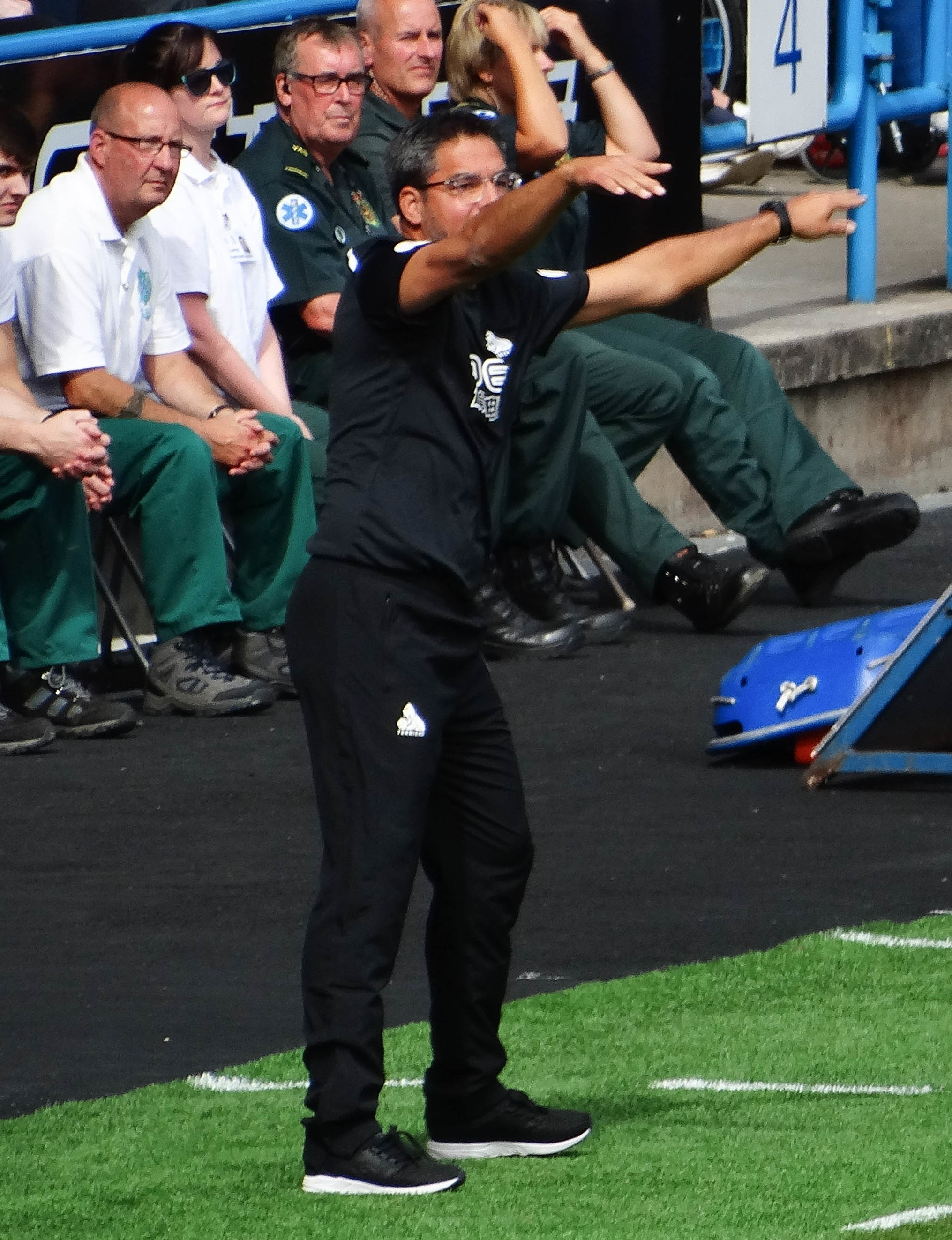
Wagner managing Huddersfield in 2018

On 5 November 2015, Wagner was appointed manager of English club Huddersfield Town following the departure of Chris Powell. He brought Christoph Bühler, who had left Borussia Dortmund on 1 November 2015, with him as his assistant.

In the summer of 2016, Wagner brought in 13 players from across the continent, including Danny Ward, Chris Löwe, and Aaron Mooy. He took his players on a bonding tour of Sweden, where they had to survive with only basic equipment for a few days. The team's success in the early 2016–17 season was largely accredited to the squad's tight bond, something that Wagner claimed was a direct result of this Sweden trip. A few weeks later, they visited Austria and kept two clean sheets in matches against Bundesliga teams Werder Bremen and Ingolstadt 04. After an unbeaten start to the 2016–17 season, Huddersfield were top of the table at the start of September, including a win at St James' Park against Newcastle United. Wagner was the EFL Championship Manager of the Month for August 2016 and February 2017.

On 29 May 2017, Huddersfield secured promotion to the Premier League for the 2017–18 season, following a victory on penalties in the play-off final against Reading. On 30 June 2017, Wagner signed an improved two-year contract. He was praised for his achievements in keeping Huddersfield in the Premier League at the end of the 2017–18 season, a feat regarded by bookmakers as improbable and described by The Guardian as "the Premier League's greatest survival story", with Wagner in particular noted as "a leader of rare charisma and intelligence."

On 14 January 2019, Wagner and Huddersfield Town agreed to terminate his contract by mutual consent, with the team in last place and eight points from safety.

=== Schalke 04 ===
On 9 May 2019, Wagner was appointed as manager of Bundesliga club Schalke 04 on a three-year contract until 30 June 2022. In the second half of the 2019–20 season, Schalke set a new club record of 16 league games without a win between 25 January and 27 June 2020. The winless streak continued with an 0–8 defeat against Bayern Munich in the first match of the 2020–21 season. After a 3–1 defeat against Werder Bremen, the 18th winless league match in a row, Wagner was sacked on 27 September 2020. In his absence, Schalke were relegated that season.

=== Young Boys ===
In the summer of 2021, Wagner was heavily linked with the vacant manager's position at recently relegated Championship club West Bromwich Albion, however talks broke down. On 10 June 2021, he was appointed manager of Swiss Super League reigning champions Young Boys.

On his debut on 24 July, Wagner's team won 4–3 at FC Luzern. Having won three qualifying rounds, the team took part in the UEFA Champions League group stage where they came last with one victory, a 2–1 home win over Manchester United in the opening fixture on 14 September.

Wagner was unable to lead the Bern-based club to a fourth consecutive league title and was dismissed in March 2022. The team were in second place, 15 points behind FC Zürich.

=== Norwich City ===
On 6 January 2023, Wagner returned to England when he was appointed head coach of Championship club Norwich City on a twelve-month rolling contract. His first league game as Norwich manager was a 4–0 win against Preston North End at Deepdale. Wagner lead the club to finish 6th in the 2023–24 season, but the club lost in the play-off semi-final to Leeds United 4–0 on aggregate. The following day, on 17 May 2024, Wagner was sacked.

== Personal life ==
Wagner is married and has two daughters. His elder daughter, Lea Wagner (born 1994), is a sports journalist for German broadcaster ARD. In June 2023, she was appointed as a presenter of Sportschau.

In 2005, Wagner was best man at Jürgen Klopp's wedding.

== Career statistics ==
=== Club ===
Appearances and goals by club, season and competition
Club	Season	League			National Cup (Note: Includes DFB-Pokal)		Continental		Total	
Club	Season	Division	Apps	Goals	Apps	Goals	Apps	Goals	Apps	Goals
Eintracht Frankfurt	1990–91	Bundesliga	1	0	0	0	—		1	0
Mainz 05	1991–92	2. Bundesliga	8 (Note: Appearances in 2. Bundesliga Süd as the league was split into a 'North' and 'South' due to the merging of clubs from former East Germany)	0	0	0	—		8	0
Mainz 05	1992–93	2. Bundesliga	43	11	2	1	—		45	12
Mainz 05	1993–94	2. Bundesliga	35	7	1	0	—		36	7
Mainz 05	1994–95	2. Bundesliga	8	1	1	0	—		9	1
Schalke 04	1995–96	Bundesliga	16	2	1	0	—		17	2
Schalke 04	1996–97	Bundesliga	13	0	1	0	5	1	19	1
FC Gütersloh	1997–98	2. Bundesliga	23	4	0	0	—		23	4
FC Gütersloh	1998–99	2. Bundesliga	26	3	1	0	—		27	3
Waldhof Mannheim	1999–2000	2. Bundesliga	5	0	1	0	—		6	0
Darmstadt 98	1999–2000	Regionalliga Süd	19	6	0	0	—		19	6
Darmstadt 98	2000–01	Regionalliga Süd	31	11	0	0	—		31	11
Darmstadt 98	2001–02	Regionalliga Süd	26	4	3	0	—		29	4
TSG Weinheim	2003–04	Oberliga Ba-Wü	23	8	0	0	—		23	8
Pfungstadt	2004–05	Regionalliga Süd	0	0	0	0	—		0	0
Career total			277	57	11	1	5	1	293	59

=== International ===
National team	Year	Apps	Goals
United States	1997	5	0
United States	1998	1	0
Total		6	0

=== Managerial record ===
As of 16 May 2024

Managerial record by team and tenure
Team	From	To	Record					Ref.
Team	From	To	P	W	D	L	Win %	Ref.
Borussia Dortmund II	1 July 2011	31 October 2015	164	57	47	60	34.76	
Huddersfield Town	9 November 2015	14 January 2019	154	51	33	70	33.12	
Schalke 04	1 July 2019	27 September 2020	40	12	12	16	30.00	
Young Boys	1 July 2021	7 March 2022	40	19	12	9	47.50	
Norwich City	6 January 2023	17 May 2024	75	31	17	27	41.33	
Total			473	170	121	182	35.94	

== Honours ==
=== Player ===
Schalke 04

- UEFA Cup: 1996–97

=== Manager ===
Huddersfield Town

- EFL Championship play-offs: 2017

Individual

- EFL Championship Manager of the Month: August 2016, February 2017
- EFL Championship Manager of the Year: 2016–17
- Premier League Manager of the Month: August 2017
