= Michael Mason (soccer) =

American former soccer player (born 1971)

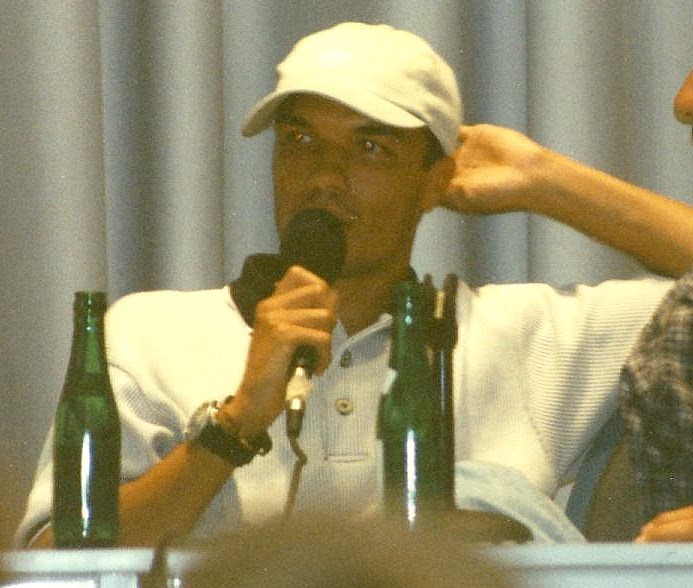
- Mason in 1997–98

Personal information
- Full name: Michael Mason
- Date of birth: June 28, 1971 (age 55)
- Place of birth: Kassel, West Germany
- Height: 5 ft 10 in (1.78 m)
- Positions: Striker; midfielder

Youth career
- KSV Baunatal

Senior career*
Years	Team	Apps	(Gls)
1990–1992	KSV Baunatal		
1992–1994	Hessen Kassel	47	(5)
1994–1996	Hamburger SV II	10	(1)
1996–1997	Hamburger SV	11	(2)
1997–1999	FC St. Pauli	49	(6)
1999–2000	FC Gütersloh		
2000	Carl Zeiss Jena	16	(7)
2000–2002	VfR Aalen	23	(1)
2002–2005	SV Elversberg	79	(16)
2005–2007	Hessen Kassel	15	(2)

International career
1997	United States	5	(0)
- * Club domestic league appearances and goals

Michael Mason (born June 28, 1971) is an American former professional soccer player who spent his playing career in Germany.

== Club career ==
Mason was born in Kassel, Germany, but holds a U.S. passport. He began playing at lower division clubs KSV Baunatal and KSV Hessen Kassel before being picked up by Hamburger SV in 1994. He played with the reserve team until 1996, when he made the first of a handful of first team appearances.

In 1997, Mason's career hit its high point. He was playing Bundesliga football at Hamburg which led to U.S. national team Steve Sampson calling him up. That year, he earned five caps. He spent two years at FC St. Pauli, then played briefly with FC Gütersloh, getting picked up by FC Carl Zeiss Jena during the 1999–2000 season.

He last played at a German Regionalliga Süd side, Hessen Kassel, a team he played with as a youth. At his previous team, SV Elversberg, he played for former U.S. national player Brent Goulet who was a longtime player and now coach for the team.

== International career ==
Mason was discovered to be eligible for the United States national team through an e-mail that was sent to manager Steve Sampson. He was called up to several qualifier matches for the 1998 FIFA World Cup.
