= 2019–20 Norwich City F.C. season =

Norwich City
2019–20 season
- Owner: Delia Smith and Michael Wynn-Jones
- Head Coach: Daniel Farke
- Stadium: Carrow Road
- Premier League: 20th (relegated)
- FA Cup: Quarter-finals
- EFL Cup: Second round
- Top goalscorer: League: Teemu Pukki (11); All: Teemu Pukki (11)
- Average home league attendance: 27,046
Home colours	Away colours	Third colours

The 2019–20 season was Norwich City's first season back in the Premier League after winning the EFL Championship the previous season. This season, they participated in the Premier League, FA Cup and EFL Cup. The season covered the period from 1 July 2019 to 26 July 2020.

Norwich finished 20th (last position) and became the first team to suffer a fifth relegation from the Premier League.

== Transfers ==
=== Transfers in ===
Date from	Position	Nationality	Name	From	Fee	Ref.
1 July 2019	AM	(England)	Daniel Adshead	(England) Rochdale	Undisclosed	
1 July 2019	CF	(Switzerland)	Josip Drmić	(Germany) Borussia Mönchengladbach	Free Transfer	
1 July 2019	GK	(Scotland)	Archie Mair	(Scotland) Aberdeen	Undisclosed	
1 July 2019	LB	(Belgium)	Rob Nizet	(Belgium) Anderlecht	Undisclosed	
5 July 2019	RW	(Scotland)	Aidan Fitzpatrick	(Scotland) Partick Thistle	Undisclosed	
8 July 2019	CB	(Belgium)	Rocky Bushiri	(Belgium) KV Oostende	Undisclosed	
8 July 2019	DM	(Scotland)	Charlie Gilmour	(England) Arsenal	Free transfer	
16 July 2019	RB	(England)	Sam Byram	(England) West Ham United	Undisclosed	
26 July 2019	CM	(Scotland)	Reece McAlear	(Scotland) Motherwell	Undisclosed	
13 January 2020	CM	(Germany)	Lukas Rupp	(Germany) 1899 Hoffenheim	Undisclosed	
28 January 2020	DM	(France)	Melvin Sitti	(France) Sochaux	Undisclosed	
31 January 2020	LB	(England)	Sam McCallum	(England) Coventry City	Undisclosed	

=== Loans in ===
Date from	Position	Nationality	Name	From	Date until	Ref.
1 July 2019	RW	(England)	Patrick Roberts	(England) Manchester City	2 January 2020	
5 July 2019	GK	(Germany)	Ralf Fährmann	(Germany) Schalke 04	10 March 2020	
7 August 2019	DM	(France)	Ibrahim Amadou	(Spain) Sevilla	31 January 2020	
12 January 2020	AM	(Slovakia)	Ondrej Duda	(Germany) Hertha BSC	30 June 2020	

=== Loans out ===
Date from	Position	Nationality	Name	To	Date until	Ref.
1 July 2019	CF	(England)	Mason Bloomfield	(England) Crawley Town	30 June 2020	
1 July 2019	LM	(England)	Josh Coley	(Scotland) Dunfermline Athletic	30 June 2020	
1 July 2019	CB	(England)	Ciaren Jones	(England) Eastbourne Borough	30 June 2020	
1 July 2019	CF	(England)	Carlton Morris	(England) Rotherham United	8 January 2020	
1 July 2019	CB	(England)	Sean Raggett	(England) Portsmouth	30 June 2020	
4 July 2019	LW	(Republic of Ireland)	Simon Power	(Scotland) Ross County	30 June 2020	
13 July 2019	GK	(Wales)	Daniel Barden	(England) Bury Town	30 June 2020	
18 July 2019	DM	(Scotland)	Charlie Gilmour	(Netherlands) Telstar	30 June 2020	
22 July 2019	DM	(Greece)	Savvas Mourgos	(Netherlands) FC Dordrecht	30 June 2020	
23 July 2019	CF	(England)	Anthony Spyrou	(England) Chesterfield	30 June 2020	
26 July 2019	LB	(England)	James Husband	(England) Blackpool	25 January 2020	
1 August 2019	CB	(Belgium)	Rocky Bushiri	(England) Blackpool	2 January 2020	
2 August 2019	RW	(England)	Diallang Jaiyesimi	(England) Swindon Town	30 June 2020	
2 August 2019	LM	(England)	Alfie Payne	(England) King's Lynn Town	30 June 2020	
4 August 2019	GK	(England)	Aston Oxborough	(England) Wealdstone	31 December 2019	
16 August 2019	DM	(Wales)	Louis Thompson	(England) Shrewsbury Town	16 January 2020	
4 January 2020	LB	(Germany)	Philip Heise	(Germany) Nürnberg	30 June 2020	
7 January 2020	CB	(Belgium)	Rocky Bushiri	(Belgium) Sint-Truiden	30 June 2020	
8 January 2020	CB	(England)	Akin Famewo	(Scotland) St Mirren	30 June 2020	
8 January 2020	CF	(England)	Carlton Morris	(England) Milton Keynes Dons	30 June 2020	
14 January 2020	GK	(England)	Billy Johnson	(England) Braintree Town	30 June 2020	
16 January 2020	DM	(England)	Louis Lomas	(United States) Tampa Bay Rowdies	December 2020	
16 January 2020	DM	(Wales)	Louis Thompson	(England) Milton Keynes Dons	30 June 2020	
17 January 2020	RM	(Republic of Ireland)	Simon Power	(England) King's Lynn Town	30 June 2020	
23 January 2020	CB	(England)	Timi Odusina	(England) Hartlepool United	30 June 2020	
31 January 2020	LB	(England)	Sam McCallum	(England) Coventry City	30 June 2020	
31 January 2020	LB	(England)	Caleb Richards	(England) Yeovil Town	30 June 2020	
31 January 2020	CM	(Iceland)	Ísak Thorvaldsson	(England) Fleetwood Town	30 June 2020	

=== Transfers out ===
Date	Position	Nationality	Name	To	Fee	Ref.
1 July 2019	CF	(England)	Tristan Abrahams	(Wales) Newport County	Released	
1 July 2019	DM	(England)	Finlay Barnes	Free agent	Released	
1 July 2019	GK	(England)	Ryan Dickerson	Free agent	Released	
1 July 2019	CB	(England)	Aaron Ekumah	Free agent	Released	
1 July 2019	RW	(Cameroon)	Pierre Fonkeu	(France) RC Lens	Released	
1 July 2019	CB	(Germany)	Marcel Franke	(Germany) Hannover 96	Undisclosed	
1 July 2019	LW	(England)	Matt Jarvis	(England) Woking	Released	
1 July 2019	DM	(England)	Bilal Kamal	(United States) New Hampshire Wildcats	Released	
1 July 2019	MF	(England)	Spencer Keller	Free agent	Released	
1 July 2019	AM	(England)	Louis McIntosh	(England) Lowestoft	Released	
1 July 2019	RW	(Scotland)	Steven Naismith	(Scotland) Hearts	Released	
1 July 2019	RB	(Portugal)	Ivo Pinto	(Croatia) Dinamo Zagreb	Free transfer	
1 July 2019	LW	(Netherlands)	Yanic Wildschut	(Israel) Maccabi Haifa	Released	
20 July 2019	CF	(Portugal)	Nélson Oliveira	(Greece) AEK Athens	Undisclosed	
27 July 2019	RW	(England)	Ben Marshall	Free agent	Mutual consent	
27 August 2019	LB	(Iceland)	Atli Barkarson	(Norway) Fredrikstad	Free transfer	
8 January 2020	CF	(Germany)	Dennis Srbeny	(Germany) Paderborn	Undisclosed	
25 January 2020	LB	(England)	James Husband	(England) Blackpool	Undisclosed	

== Pre-season friendlies ==
14 July 2019 Friendly	(Germany) Arminia Bielefeld	2–2	(England) Norwich City	Gutersloh, Germany
16:00 CEST	Edmundsson (yellow card) 10' (yellow-red card) 35'; Yabo 31'; Consbruch 86'	Report	Godfrey (yellow card) 12'; Hanley (yellow card) 36'; Srbeny 38'; Drmić 43' (pen.)	Stadium: Energieversum Stadion; Attendance: 2,354

19 July 2019 Friendly	(Germany) Schalke 04	1–2	(England) Norwich City	Lotte, Germany
18:30 CEST	Matondo 48'	Report	Pukki 13'; Leitner 59'	Stadium: Frimo Stadion

24 July 2019 Friendly	Norwich City	1–3	Brentford	Colney
16:30 BST	Buendía 9'	Report	Marcondes 11'; Watkins 69'; Pinnock 78'	Stadium: Colney Training Centre

27 July 2019 Friendly	Luton Town	1–5	Norwich City	Luton
15:00 BST	Potts 34'; Collins (yellow card) 77'	Report	Stiepermann 4'; Drmić 6', 14', 36'; Roberts 56'	Stadium: Kenilworth Road; Attendance: 4,218; Referee: Keith Stroud

30 July 2019 Friendly	Norwich City	1–4	Atalanta	Norwich
19:00 BST	Cantwell 16'	Report	Muriel 45', 62'; Pašalić 85'; Barrow 90+1'	Stadium: Carrow Road

3 August 2019 Friendly	Norwich City	1–0	Toulouse	Norwich
16:00 BST	McLean 39'	Report		Stadium: Carrow Road; Attendance: 12,650; Referee: Kevin Friend

12 June 2020 Friendly	Tottenham Hotspur	1–2	Norwich City	Tottenham
15:00 BST	Lamela	Report	Drmić; Vrančić	Stadium: Tottenham Hotspur Stadium; Attendance: 0
Note: Match played in four quarters of 30 minutes.

== Competitions ==
=== Overview ===
Competition	First match	Last match	Starting round	Final position	Record							
Competition	First match	Last match	Starting round	Final position	Pld	W	D	L	GF	GA	GD	Win %
Premier League	9 August 2019	26 July 2020	Matchday 1	20th	38	5	6	27	26	75	−49	13.16
FA Cup	4 January 2020	27 June 2020	Third round	Quarter-finals	4	2	1	1	8	6	+2	50.00
EFL Cup	27 August 2019		Second round	Second round	1	0	0	1	0	1	−1	0.00
Total					43	7	7	29	34	82	−48	16.28

Source: Soccerway

=== Premier League ===
==== League table ====
Pos	Team	Pld	W	D	L	GF	GA	GD	Pts	Qualification or relegation
16	West Ham United	38	10	9	19	49	62	−13	39	
17	Aston Villa	38	9	8	21	41	67	−26	35	
18	Bournemouth (R)	38	9	7	22	40	65	−25	34	Relegation to EFL Championship
19	Watford (R)	38	8	10	20	36	64	−28	34	Relegation to EFL Championship
20	Norwich City (R)	38	5	6	27	26	75	−49	21	Relegation to EFL Championship

Source: Premier League
Rules for classification: 1) Points; 2) Goal difference; 3) Goals scored; 4) If the champions, relegated teams or qualified teams for UEFA competitions cannot be determined by rules 1 to 3, rules 4.1 to 4.3 are applied – 4.1) Points gained in head to head record between such teams; 4.2) Away goals scored in head to head record between such teams; 4.3) Play-offs
(R) Relegated

==== Results summary ====
Overall								Home						Away					
Pld	W	D	L	GF	GA	GD	Pts	W	D	L	GF	GA	GD	W	D	L	GF	GA	GD
38	5	6	27	26	75	−49	21	4	3	12	19	37	−18	1	3	15	7	38	−31

Source: BBC

==== Results by matchday ====
Matchday	1	2	3	4	5	6	7	8	9	10	11	12	13	14	15	16	17	18	19	20	21	22	23	24	25	26	27	28	29	30	31	32	33	34	35	36	37	38
Ground	A	H	H	A	H	A	A	H	A	H	A	H	A	H	A	H	A	H	A	H	H	A	H	A	A	H	A	H	A	H	H	A	H	A	H	A	H	A
Result	L	W	L	L	W	L	L	L	D	L	L	L	W	D	L	L	D	L	L	D	D	L	W	L	D	L	L	W	L	L	L	L	L	L	L	L	L	L
Position	16	11	17	19	12	16	17	19	19	19	19	20	18	19	19	19	19	19	20	20	20	20	20	20	20	20	20	20	20	20	20	20	20	20	20	20	20	20

Source: Statto.com
A = Away; H = Home; W = Win; D = Draw; L = Loss

==== Matches ====
On 13 June 2019, the Premier League fixtures were announced.

9 August 2019 1	Liverpool	4–1	Norwich City	Liverpool
20:00 BST	Hanley 7' (o.g.); Salah 19' van Dijk 28'; Origi 42'	Report	Leitner (yellow card) 60'; Pukki 64'; Buendía (yellow card) 65'	Stadium: Anfield; Attendance: 53,333; Referee: Michael Oliver

17 August 2019 2	Norwich City	3–1	Newcastle United	Norwich
15:00 BST	Pukki 32', 63', 75'; Aarons (yellow card) 37'	Report	Joelinton (yellow card) 44'; Dummett (yellow card) 85'; Longstaff (yellow card) 90+1'; Shelvey 90+3'	Stadium: Carrow Road; Attendance: 27,059; Referee: Stuart Attwell

24 August 2019 3	Norwich City	2–3	Chelsea	Norwich
12:30 BST	Cantwell 6'; Pukki 31'; Stiepermann (yellow card) 43'	Report	Abraham 3', 68'; Mount 17'; Jorginho (yellow card) 33'	Stadium: Carrow Road; Attendance: 27,032; Referee: Martin Atkinson

31 August 2019 4	West Ham United	2–0	Norwich City	Stratford
15:00 BST	Haller 24'; Yarmolenko 56'; Fredericks (yellow card) 60'; Snodgrass (yellow card) 74'	Report	Aarons (yellow card) 62'	Stadium: London Stadium; Attendance: 59,950; Referee: Paul Tierney

14 September 2019 5	Norwich City	3–2	Manchester City	Norwich
17:30 BST	McLean 18', (yellow card) 64'; Cantwell 28', (yellow card) 87'; Byram (yellow card) 45+2'; Pukki 50'	Report	Agüero 45'; B. Silva (yellow card) 69'; Rodri 88'	Stadium: Carrow Road; Attendance: 27,035; Referee: Kevin Friend

21 September 2019 6	Burnley	2–0	Norwich City	Burnley
15:00 BST	Wood 10', 14'	Report	Amadou (yellow card) 33'	Stadium: Turf Moor; Attendance: 19,712; Referee: David Coote

28 September 2019 7	Crystal Palace	2–0	Norwich City	Selhurst
15:00 BST	Milivojević 21' (pen.), (yellow card) 90+4'; Ayew (yellow card) 58'; Schlupp (yellow card) 89'; Townsend 90+2'	Report	Stiepermann (yellow card) 64'	Stadium: Selhurst Park; Referee: Jonathan Moss

5 October 2019 8	Norwich City	1–5	Aston Villa	Norwich
15:00 BST	Pukki (yellow card) 32'; Drmić 87'	Report	Wesley 14', 30'; McGinn (yellow card) 42'; Grealish 49'; Hourihane 61', (yellow card) 62'; Guilbert (yellow card) 70'; Douglas Luiz 83'	Stadium: Carrow Road; Attendance: 27,045; Referee: Andrew Madley

19 October 2019 9	Bournemouth	0–0	Norwich City	Bournemouth
15:00 BST	Smith (yellow card) 70'	Report	Lewis (yellow card) 29'; McLean (yellow card) 68'; Pukki (yellow card) 86'	Stadium: Vitality Stadium; Attendance: 10,669; Referee: Lee Mason

27 October 2019 10	Norwich City	1–3	Manchester United	Norwich
16:30 GMT	Godfrey (yellow card) 27'; Hernandez 88'; Aarons (yellow card) 90+3'	Report	McTominay 21'; Rashford 30'; Wan-Bissaka (yellow card) 45+1'; Young (yellow card) 60'; Martial 73'	Stadium: Carrow Road; Attendance: 27,108; Referee: Stuart Attwell

2 November 2019 11	Brighton & Hove Albion	2–0	Norwich City	Brighton
15:00 GMT	Trossard 68'; Duffy 84'	Report	Stiepermann (yellow card) 63'	Stadium: Falmer Stadium; Attendance: 30,539; Referee: Kevin Friend

8 November 2019 12	Norwich City	0–2	Watford	Norwich
20:00 GMT	Vrančić (yellow card) 86'	Report	Deulofeu 2'; Kabasele (yellow card) 49' (yellow-red card) 65'; Gray 52'; Hughes (yellow card) 69'; Masina (yellow card) 90+3'	Stadium: Carrow Road; Attendance: 27,074; Referee: Andre Marriner

23 November 2019 13	Everton	0–2	Norwich City	Liverpool
15:00 GMT	Schneiderlin (yellow card) 20'; Holgate (yellow card) 81'; Coleman (yellow card) 90+3'	Report	Zimmermann (yellow card) 23'; Byram (yellow card) 47'; Cantwell 55'; Aarons (yellow card) 81'; Tettey (yellow card) 84'; McLean (yellow card) 87'; Srbeny 90+2'	Stadium: Goodison Park; Attendance: 39,241; Referee: Anthony Taylor

1 December 2019 14	Norwich City	2–2	Arsenal	Norwich
14:00 GMT	Pukki 21'; Krul (yellow card) 29'; McLean (yellow card) 44'; Cantwell 45+2'	Report	Aubameyang 29' (pen.), 57'; Chambers (yellow card) 66'	Stadium: Carrow Road; Attendance: 27,067; Referee: Paul Tierney

4 December 2019 15	Southampton	2–1	Norwich City	Southampton
19:30 GMT	Ings 22'; Bertrand 43'; Djenepo (yellow card) 59'	Report	Byram (yellow card) 62'; Pukki 66'	Stadium: St Mary's Stadium; Attendance: 27,019; Referee: Kevin Friend

8 December 2019 16	Norwich City	1–2	Sheffield United	Norwich
14:00 GMT	Tettey 27'	Report	Egan (yellow card) 38'; Norwood (yellow card) 40'; Stevens 49'; Baldock 52'; Basham (yellow card) 74'; Robinson (yellow card) 90+5'	Stadium: Carrow Road; Attendance: 26,881; Referee: Simon Hooper

14 December 2019 17	Leicester City	1–1	Norwich City	Leicester
15:00 GMT	Krul 38' (o.g.)	Report	Pukki 26'; Cantwell (yellow card) 33'; Trybull (yellow card) 52'; Buendía (yellow card) 60'; Tettey (yellow card) 78'; Krul (yellow card) 90+3'	Stadium: King Power Stadium; Attendance: 32,101; Referee: Andrew Madley

21 December 2019 18	Norwich City	1–2	Wolverhampton Wanderers	Norwich
15:00 GMT	Cantwell 17'; Byram (yellow card) 53'; Hanley (yellow card) 90+1'	Report	Jonny (yellow card) 33'; Saïss (yellow card) 57', (goal) 60'; Moutinho (yellow card) 70'; Jiménez 81'; Doherty (yellow card) 90+6'	Stadium: Carrow Road; Attendance: 27,053; Referee: Peter Bankes

26 December 2019 19	Aston Villa	1–0	Norwich City	Birmingham
15:00 GMT	Hourihane 64'; Wesley (yellow card) 88'; Luiz (yellow card) 89'	Report	Tettey (yellow card) 35'; Pukki (yellow card) 42'; Trybull (yellow card) 74'	Stadium: Villa Park; Attendance: 41,289; Referee: Chris Kavanagh

28 December 2019 20	Norwich City	2–2	Tottenham Hotspur	Norwich
17:30 GMT	Vrančić 18', (yellow card) 22'; Lewis (yellow card) 54'; Krul (yellow card) 57'; Aurier 61' (o.g.)	Report	Eriksen 55', (yellow card) 90+6'; Lucas (yellow card) 69'; Kane 83' (pen.); Alderweireld (yellow card) 90+3'	Stadium: Carrow Road; Attendance: 27,072; Referee: Kevin Friend

1 January 2020 21	Norwich City	1–1	Crystal Palace	Norwich
17:30 GMT	Cantwell 4'; Zimmermann (yellow card) 42'; Aarons (yellow card) 74'; Hanley (yellow card) 76'; Stiepermann (yellow card) 83'; Tettey (yellow card) 89'	Report	Wickham 85'	Stadium: Carrow Road; Attendance: 27,021; Referee: Jonathan Moss

11 January 2020 22	Manchester United	4–0	Norwich City	Manchester
15:00 GMT	Rashford 27', 52' (pen.); Martial 54'; Greenwood 76'	Report		Stadium: Old Trafford; Attendance: 73,271; Referee: Anthony Taylor

18 January 2020 23	Norwich City	1–0	Bournemouth	Norwich
15:00 GMT	Pukki 33' (pen.); Buendía (yellow card) 50'; Godfrey (red card) 76'; Krul (yellow card) 77'	Report	S. Cook (red card) 31'; C. Wilson (yellow card) 77'; Smith (yellow card) 90+5'	Stadium: Carrow Road; Attendance: 26,781; Referee: Paul Tierney

22 January 2020 24	Tottenham Hotspur	2–1	Norwich City	Tottenham
19:30 GMT	Alli 38'; Son 79'	Report	Cantwell (yellow card) 47'; Pukki 70' (pen.)	Stadium: Tottenham Hotspur Stadium; Attendance: 58,182; Referee: Chris Kavanagh

1 February 2020 25	Newcastle United	0–0	Norwich City	Newcastle
15:00 GMT	Yedlin (yellow card) 52'; Bentaleb (yellow card) 80'	Report	Cantwell (yellow card) 44'	Stadium: St James' Park; Attendance: 52,204; Referee: Martin Atkinson

15 February 2020 26	Norwich City	0–1	Liverpool	Norwich
17:30 GMT	Hanley (yellow card) 41'	Report	Mané 78', (yellow card) 90'; Keïta (yellow card) 83'	Stadium: Carrow Road; Attendance: 27,110; Referee: Stuart Attwell

23 February 2020 27	Wolverhampton Wanderers	3–0	Norwich City	Wolverhampton
14:00 GMT	Jota 19', 30'; Jiménez (yellow card) 41', (goal) 50'; Coady (yellow card) 68'	Report	Aarons (yellow card) 45'; Godfrey (yellow card) 77'; Buendía (yellow card) 87'	Stadium: Molineux; Attendance: 31,046; Referee: Chris Kavanagh

28 February 2020 28	Norwich City	1–0	Leicester City	Norwich
20:00 GMT	Hanley (yellow card) 53'; Lewis 70'	Report	Praet (yellow card) 62'; Schmeichel (yellow card) 87'	Stadium: Carrow Road; Attendance: 27,010; Referee: Craig Pawson

7 March 2020 29	Sheffield United	1–0	Norwich City	Sheffield
15:00 GMT	Sharp 36'	Report		Stadium: Bramall Lane; Attendance: 31,379; Referee: Simon Hooper

19 June 2020 30	Norwich City	0–3	Southampton	Norwich
18:00 BST	Aarons (yellow card) 90+2'	Report	Ings 49', (yellow card) 74'; Armstrong 54'; Redmond 79'	Stadium: Carrow Road; Attendance: 0 Referee: Kevin Friend
Note: The match was postponed on 13 March due to concerns over the coronavirus pandemic, It was rescheduled to 19 June.

24 June 2020 31	Norwich City	0–1	Everton	Norwich
18:00 BST		Report	Keane 55'; Kean (yellow card) 80'	Stadium: Carrow Road; Attendance: 0 Referee: Andrew Madley
Note: The match was postponed on 13 March due to concerns over the coronavirus pandemic, It was rescheduled to 24 June.

1 July 2020 32	Arsenal	4–0	Norwich City	Holloway
18:00 BST	Aubameyang 33', 67'; Xhaka 37'; Martínez (yellow card) 63'; Cédric 81'	Report	McLean (yellow card) 27'; Rupp (yellow card) 31'; Vrančić (yellow card) 86'; Stiepermann (yellow card) 90+2'	Stadium: Emirates Stadium; Attendance: 0 Referee: Peter Bankes
Note: The match was postponed on 19 March due to concerns over the coronavirus pandemic. It was rescheduled to 1 July.

4 July 2020 33	Norwich City	0–1	Brighton & Hove Albion	Norwich
12:30 BST	Lewis (yellow card) 38'; Cantwell (yellow card) 90+1'	Report	Trossard 25'; Lamptey (yellow card) 88'; Groß (yellow card) 89'	Stadium: Carrow Road; Attendance: 0 Referee: Stuart Attwell
Note: The match was postponed on 19 March due to concerns over the coronavirus pandemic. It was rescheduled to 4 July.

7 July 2020 34	Watford	2–1	Norwich City	Watford
18:00 BST	Dawson 10'; Hughes (yellow card) 23'; Welbeck 55'; Cleverley (yellow card) 90+4'	Report	Buendía 4', (yellow card) 90+3'; Lewis (yellow card) 9'; Tettey (yellow card) 11'; Godfrey (yellow card) 88'	Stadium: Vicarage Road; Attendance: 0 Referee: Anthony Taylor
Note: The match was postponed on 3 April due to concerns over the coronavirus pandemic. It was rescheduled to 7 July.

11 July 2020 35	Norwich City	0–4	West Ham United	Norwich
12:30 BST	Stiepermann (yellow card) 33'	Report	Antonio 11', 45+1', 54', 74'	Stadium: Carrow Road; Attendance: 0 Referee: Kevin Friend
Note: The match was postponed on 3 April due to concerns over the coronavirus pandemic. It was rescheduled to 11 July. This match marked Norwich's relegation from the Premier League.

14 July 2020 36	Chelsea	1–0	Norwich City	Fulham
20:15 BST	Giroud 45+3'; Zouma (yellow card) 60'; Kovačić (yellow card) 62'	Report	Cantwell (yellow card) 58'; Buendía (yellow card) 88'	Stadium: Stamford Bridge; Attendance: 0 Referee: Jonathan Moss
Note: The match was postponed on 3 April due to concerns over the coronavirus pandemic. It was rescheduled to 14 July.

18 July 2020 37	Norwich City	0–2	Burnley	Norwich
17:30 BST	Buendía (red card) 35'; Drmić (red card) 45+3'	Report	Wood 45+5'; Godfrey 80' (o.g.)	Stadium: Carrow Road; Attendance: 0 Referee: Kevin Friend
Note: The match was postponed on 3 April due to concerns over the coronavirus pandemic. It was rescheduled to 18 July.

26 July 2020 38	Manchester City	5–0	Norwich City	Manchester
16:00 BST	Gabriel Jesus 11'; De Bruyne 45+1', 90'; Cancelo (yellow card) 51'; Sterling 79'; Mahrez 83'	Report	Zimmermann (yellow card) 90+1'	Stadium: City of Manchester Stadium; Attendance: 0 Referee: Craig Pawson
Note: The match was postponed on 3 April due to concerns over the coronavirus pandemic. It was rescheduled to 26 July.

=== FA Cup ===
The third round draw was made live on BBC Two from Etihad Stadium, Micah Richards and Tony Adams conducted the draw. The fourth round draw was made by Alex Scott and David O'Leary on Monday, 6 January. The draw for the fifth round was made on 27 January 2020, live on The One Show.

4 January 2020 Third round	Preston North End	2–4	Norwich City	Preston
15:01 GMT	Bodin 48'; Ripley (yellow card) 60'; Ledson (yellow card) 68'; Harrop 84'	Report	Idah 2', 38', 61' (pen.); Hernández 28'	Stadium: Deepdale; Attendance: 7,616; Referee: Martin Atkinson

25 January 2020 Fourth round	Burnley	1–2	Norwich City	Burnley
15:00 GMT	Long (yellow card) 68'; Pieters 72'	Report	Stiepermann (yellow card) 17'; Zimmermann (yellow card) 44'; Hanley 53', (yellow card) 70'; Drmić 57'	Stadium: Turf Moor; Attendance: 8,071; Referee: Michael Oliver

4 March 2020 Fifth round	Tottenham Hotspur	1–1 (a.e.t.) (2–3 p)	Norwich City	Tottenham
19:45 GMT	Vertonghen 13'; Skipp (yellow card) 71'	Report	Vrančić (yellow card) 12'; Hanley (yellow card) 73'; Drmić 78'	Stadium: Tottenham Hotspur Stadium; Attendance: 58,007; Referee: Paul Tierney
	Penalties
	Dier (penalty scored); Lamela (penalty missed); Lo Celso (penalty scored); Parrott (penalty missed); Fernandes (penalty missed)		(penalty missed) McLean; (penalty scored) Idah; (penalty scored) Stiepermann; (penalty scored) Cantwell

27 June 2020 Quarter-finals	Norwich City	1–2 (a.e.t.)	Manchester United	Norwich
17:30 BST	Cantwell 75'; Klose (red card) 89'	Report	Ighalo 51'; Fernandes (yellow card) 109'; Maguire 118'	Stadium: Carrow Road; Attendance: 0 Referee: Jonathan Moss
Note: The match was postponed due to the COVID-19 pandemic, and rescheduled to 27 June.

=== EFL Cup ===
The second round draw was made on 13 August 2019 following the conclusion of all but one first-round matches.

27 August 2019 Second round	Crawley Town	1–0	Norwich City	Crawley
19:45 BST	Lubala 17'; Camará (yellow card) 23'; Luyambula (yellow card) 61'; Bulman (yellow card) 85'; Grego-Cox (yellow card) 90'	Report	Vrančić (yellow card) 29'	Stadium: Broadfield Stadium; Attendance: 5,109; Referee: John Busby

== Statistics ==
=== Appearances, goals and cards ===
No.	Pos	Player	Premier League			FA Cup			EFL Cup			Total			Discipline	
No.	Pos	Player	Starts	Sub	Goals	Starts	Sub	Goals	Starts	Sub	Goals	Starts	Sub	Goals	Booked	Sent off (straight red)
1	GK	(Netherlands) Tim Krul	36	0	0	2	0	0	—	—	—	38	0	0	4	0
2	DF	(England) Max Aarons	36	0	0	2	1	0	0	1	0	38	2	0	7	0
3	DF	(England) Sam Byram	15	2	0	2	0	0	1	0	0	18	2	0	4	0
4	MF	(England) Ben Godfrey	30	0	0	2	0	0	0	1	0	32	1	0	3	1
5	DF	(Scotland) Grant Hanley	14	1	0	2	1	1	—	—	—	16	2	1	6	0
6	DF	(Germany) Christoph Zimmermann	16	1	0	2	0	0	1	0	0	19	1	0	3	0
7	MF	(Germany) Lukas Rupp	8	4	0	3	0	0	—	—	—	11	4	0	1	0
8	MF	(Bosnia and Herzegovina) Mario Vrančić	6	14	1	2	0	0	1	0	0	9	14	1	5	0
10	MF	(Germany) Moritz Leitner	7	2	0	1	0	0	—	—	—	8	2	0	1	0
11	MF	(Cuba) Onel Hernández	14	12	1	2	1	1	—	—	—	16	13	2	0	0
12	DF	(Northern Ireland) Jamal Lewis	25	3	1	4	0	0	—	—	—	29	3	1	4	0
14	MF	(England) Todd Cantwell	30	7	6	3	0	1	—	—	—	33	7	7	6	0
15	DF	(Switzerland) Timm Klose	7	0	0	1	0	0	1	0	0	9	0	0	0	1
17	MF	(Argentina) Emi Buendía	28	8	1	2	0	0	0	1	0	30	9	1	5	1
18	MF	(Germany) Marco Stiepermann	13	9	0	2	1	0	—	—	—	15	10	0	7	0
19	MF	(Germany) Tom Trybull	15	1	0	3	1	0	—	—	—	18	2	0	2	0
20	ST	(Switzerland) Josip Drmić	5	16	1	2	1	2	—	—	—	7	17	3	0	1
22	ST	(Finland) Teemu Pukki	33	3	11	1	1	0	—	—	—	34	4	11	3	0
23	MF	(Scotland) Kenny McLean	32	5	1	1	3	0	1	0	0	34	8	1	5	0
27	MF	(Norway) Alexander Tettey	28	2	1	1	1	0	—	—	—	29	3	1	5	0
33	GK	(Northern Ireland) Michael McGovern	1	1	0	1	0	0	—	—	—	2	1	0	0	0
35	ST	(Republic of Ireland) Adam Idah	1	11	0	1	2	3	1	0	0	3	13	3	0	0
41	DF	(England) Jordan Thomas	0	1	0	—	—	—	—	—	—	0	1	0	0	0
43	DF	(England) Akin Famewo	0	1	0	—	—	—	—	—	—	0	1	0	0	0
46	MF	(England) Daniel Adshead	—	—	—	—	—	—	—	—	—	0	0	0	0	0
56	MF	(England) Josh Martin	0	5	0	—	—	—	—	—	—	0	5	0	0	0
60	GK	(Scotland) Archie Mair	—	—	—	—	—	—	—	—	—	0	0	0	0	0
Players out on loan:
16	DF	(Germany) Philip Heise	—	—	—	—	—	—	1	0	0	1	0	0	0	0
34	MF	(Wales) Louis Thompson	—	—	—	—	—	—	—	—	—	0	0	0	0	0
38	GK	(England) Aston Oxborough	—	—	—	—	—	—	—	—	—	0	0	0	0	0
—	DF	(England) Sean Raggett	—	—	—	—	—	—	—	—	—	0	0	0	0	0
—	ST	(England) Carlton Morris	—	—	—	—	—	—	—	—	—	0	0	0	0	0
Players no longer at the club:
7	MF	(England) Patrick Roberts	0	3	0	—	—	—	1	0	0	1	3	0	0	0
21	GK	(Germany) Ralf Fährmann	1	0	0	1	0	0	1	0	0	3	0	0	0	0
24	MF	(France) Ibrahim Amadou	8	3	0	1	0	0	1	0	0	10	3	0	1	0
25	MF	(Slovakia) Ondrej Duda	9	1	0	0	2	0	—	—	—	9	3	0	0	0
32	ST	(Germany) Dennis Srbeny	0	8	1	—	—	—	1	0	0	1	8	1	0	0
—	DF	(England) James Husband	—	—	—	—	—	—	—	—	—	0	0	0	0	0
—	MF	(England) Ben Marshall	—	—	—	—	—	—	—	—	—	0	0	0	0	0
—	ST	(Portugal) Nélson Oliveira	—	—	—	—	—	—	—	—	—	0	0	0	0	0

=== Goalscorers ===
Rank	Pos.	Player	Premier League	FA Cup	EFL Cup	Total
1	ST	Teemu Pukki	11	0	0	11
2	MF	Todd Cantwell	6	1	0	7
3	FW	Josip Drmić	1	2	0	3
3	ST	Adam Idah	0	3	0	3
5	MF	Onel Hernández	1	1	0	2
6	MF	Kenny McLean	1	0	0	1
6	FW	Dennis Srbeny	1	0	0	1
6	MF	Alexander Tettey	1	0	0	1
6	MF	Mario Vrančić	1	0	0	1
6	DF	Jamal Lewis	1	0	0	1
6	MF	Emi Buendía	1	0	0	1
6	DF	Grant Hanley	0	1	0	1
Own goals			1	0	0	1
Totals			26	8	0	34
