= Akin Famewo =

English footballer (born 1998)

Personal information
- Full name: Akinlolu Richard Olamide Famewo
- Date of birth: 9 November 1998 (age 28)
- Place of birth: Lewisham, England
- Height: 6 ft 2 in (1.87 m)
- Position: Centre-back

Team information
- Current team: Bolton Wanderers
- Number: 14

Youth career
- –2016: Luton Town

Senior career*
Years	Team	Apps	(Gls)
2016–2019	Luton Town	6	(0)
2018–2019	→ Grimsby Town (loan)	10	(0)
2019–2022	Norwich City	1	(0)
2020	→ St Mirren (loan)	9	(0)
2020–2021	→ Charlton Athletic (loan)	22	(0)
2021–2022	→ Charlton Athletic (loan)	37	(1)
2022–2025	Sheffield Wednesday	65	(1)
2025–2026	Hull City	15	(1)
2026–	Bolton Wanderers	10	(0)
- * Club domestic league appearances and goals as of 22:10, 3 November 2026 (UTC)

Akinlolu Richard Olamide Famewo (born 9 November 1998) is an English professional footballer who plays as a centre-back for EFL Championship club Bolton Wanderers.

== Career ==
=== Luton Town ===
Born in Lewisham, Greater London, Famewo joined Luton Town as an under-10 and progressed through the club's youth system. He was a member of the under-18 team that won the Youth Alliance South East title and the Youth Alliance Cup in 2015–16, and also reached the quarter-finals of the FA Youth Cup, in which they lost 1–0 to Blackburn Rovers.

Famewo signed his first professional contract on 18 July 2016 at the start of the second year of his scholarship. He was named in the matchday squad for the first time on 10 August for Luton's 3–1 win at home to newly relegated Championship club Aston Villa in the EFL Cup first round, but remained an unused substitute. Famewo made his professional debut on 16 August as an 86th-minute substitute for Jordan Cook in a 2–1 win at home to Newport County. His first start came on 30 August in Luton's 2–1 win away to Gillingham in the EFL Trophy and made his first league start in a 1–1 draw away to Hartlepool United on 27 September. After Famewo's full league debut, manager Nathan Jones said "He was outstanding and he's going to be a top player. He has all the attributes and he's ours and we're proud of him". Famewo missed much of the rest of the campaign due to injury, but he returned to Luton's matchday squad as an unused substitute for the final part of the season and finished 2016–17 with six appearances.

Famewo signed a one-year extension to his contract on 6 July 2018 to keep him at the club until June 2020, and joined League Two club Grimsby Town on a season-long loan. He was recalled by Luton on 29 January 2019, having made 12 appearances for Grimsby.

=== Norwich City ===
Famewo signed for Championship club Norwich City on 29 January 2019 on a one-and-a-half-year contract for an undisclosed fee.

He was loaned to Scottish Premiership club St Mirren on 8 January 2020 until the end of the 2019–20 season. Famewo joined newly relegated League One club Charlton Athletic on 26 September 2020 on loan for the 2020–21 season. Charlton re-signed Famewo on a season-long loan on 8 July 2021, with the option of a permanent transfer.

However, this option was not taken up and Famewo rejoined Norwich City at the end of the 2021–22 season following their relegation back to the Championship.

=== Sheffield Wednesday ===
On 6 July 2022, Famewo joined Sheffield Wednesday for an undisclosed fee. He made his debut away to Milton Keynes Dons on 6 August 2022, but it would be cut short by a serious-looking injury. Following Wednesday's EFL Cup win against Sunderland, manager Darren Moore confirmed Famewo would be out for some considerable time. He would return to the first-team squad against Derby County on 3 December. He scored his maiden Wednesday goal against Bristol Rovers on 18 April 2023. He was offered a new contract at the end of the 2024–25 season.

=== Hull City ===
On 29 July 2025, Famewo joined Championship rivals Hull City on a free transfer, signing a two-year contract with the option of another. He made his debut on 12 August 2025, coming off the bench in the EFL Cup defeat to Wrexham on penalties. Famewo scored his first goal for Hull City on 20 January 2026, in the 3–0 win away to Preston North End.

=== Bolton Wanderers ===
On 1 July 2026, he signed for newly promoted Championship club Bolton Wanderers on a three year deal for an undisclosed fee.

== Personal life ==
Born in England, Famewo is of Nigerian descent.

== Career statistics ==
As of 3 November 2026

Appearances and goals by club, season and competition
Club	Season	League			National cup (Note: Includes FA Cup, Scottish Cup)		League cup (Note: Includes EFL Cup)		Other		Total	
Club	Season	Division	Apps	Goals	Apps	Goals	Apps	Goals	Apps	Goals	Apps	Goals
Luton Town	2016–17	League Two	3	0	0	0	0	0	3 (Note: Appearance(s) in EFL Trophy)	0	6	0
Luton Town	2017–18	League Two	3	0	0	0	0	0	5	0	8	0
Luton Town	Total		6	0	0	0	0	0	8	0	14	0
Grimsby Town (loan)	2018–19	League Two	10	0	1	0	0	0	1	0	12	0
Norwich City	2018–19	Championship	0	0	—		—		—		0	0
Norwich City	2019–20	Premier League	1	0	0	0	0	0	—		1	0
Norwich City	2020–21	Championship	0	0	—		0	0	—		0	0
Norwich City	Total		1	0	0	0	0	0	—		1	0
Norwich City U21	2019–20	—			—		—		3	0	3	0
St Mirren (loan)	2019–20	Scottish Premiership	9	0	4	0	—		—		13	0
Charlton Athletic (loan)	2020–21	League One	22	0	0	0	—		0	0	22	0
Charlton Athletic (loan)	2021–22	League One	37	1	2	0	0	0	1 (Note: One appearance in the EFL Trophy)	0	40	1
Charlton Athletic (loan)	Total		59	1	2	0	0	0	1	0	62	1
Sheffield Wednesday	2022–23	League One	17	1	2	0	0	0	0	0	19	1
Sheffield Wednesday	2023–24	Championship	35	0	3	0	1	0	0	0	39	0
Sheffield Wednesday	2024–25	Championship	13	0	0	0	2	0	0	0	15	0
Sheffield Wednesday	Total		65	1	5	0	3	0	0	0	73	1
Hull City	2025–26	Championship	15	1	1	0	1	0	0	0	17	1
Bolton Wanderers	2026–27	Championship	10	0	0	0	1	0	0	0	11	0
Career total			175	3	13	0	5	0	13	0	206	3
