= Caleb Richards =

English footballer (born 1998)

Personal information
- Full name: Caleb Joel Richards
- Date of birth: 8 September 1998 (age 28)
- Place of birth: Salford, England
- Height: 5 ft 9 in (1.75 m)
- Position: Defender

Team information
- Current team: Woking
- Number: 3

Youth career
- –2016: Blackpool

Senior career*
Years	Team	Apps	(Gls)
2016–2018	Blackpool	0	(0)
2016	→ Marine (loan)	1	(0)
2017	→ Warrington Town (loan)	15	(2)
2017–2018	→ Southport (loan)	9	(0)
2018	→ Leek Town (loan)	9	(0)
2018–2021	Norwich City	0	(0)
2018–2019	→ FC United of Manchester (loan)	7	(0)
2019	→ Tampa Bay Rowdies (loan)	35	(1)
2020	→ Yeovil Town (loan)	0	(0)
2020–2021	→ Kidderminster Harriers (loan)	15	(0)
2021–2025	Kidderminster Harriers	140	(2)
2025–	Woking	49	(0)
- * Club domestic league appearances and goals as of 20:06, 22 November 2026 (UTC)

Caleb Joel Richards (born 8 September 1998) is an English footballer who plays as a defender for National League club Woking.

== Club career ==
=== Blackpool ===
After being club youth team captain he signed professional terms in May 2017.

He made his first-team debut for Blackpool in the EFL Cup in a second round match against Wigan Athletic. After his appearance in an EFL Trophy match against Middlesbrough's Under 21 team where Blackpool won 4–1, he was shortlisted for the competition's player of the round.

He was released by the club at the end of the 2017–18 season.

==== Loans ====
Whilst at Blackpool he had four loan spells at other clubs. He joined Marine on loan in November 2016. At the beginning of the 2017–18 season he joined Warrington Town on loan with the loan being extended in October.

He then spent time on loan at Southport, joining them in December 2017. In March 2018 he joined Leek Town with the spell being extended until the end of the season.

=== Norwich City ===
After being released by Blackpool he joined Norwich City as a member of the club's Under 23 development team in the summer of 2018. He started ten matches for the development team before going out on loan at the end of November.

==== Loans ====
On 30 November he joined FC United of Manchester on loan. He made his debut for the club on 1 December in match against York City.

On 4 February 2019, Richards joined the Tampa Bay Rowdies in the USL Championship on loan.

On 31 January 2020, Richards joined National League side Yeovil Town on loan until the end of the 2019–20 season.

He joined Kidderminster Harriers on loan in September 2020.

=== Kidderminster Harriers ===
On 18 March 2021, Richards completed a permanent move to Kidderminster Harriers following the end of his loan spell with the club. Caleb soon became a fan favourite with the Harriers, having played every minute of every match, bar one for Harriers in the first two seasons. This included a consecutive 90 minutes played on 69 occasions for the young full-back. His performances were duly noted at Aggbourough – he ended 2021/22 as the Young Player of the Season and Players' Player of the Season. On 23 May 2023, he signed a new 2 year deal following the clubs promotion to the National League.

=== Woking ===
On 24 June 2025, it was announced that Richards would join Woking on a one-year deal following his release from Kidderminster Harriers.

== Career statistics ==
As of match played 21 November 2026

Appearances and goals by club, season and competition
Club	Season	League			National cup		League cup		Other		Total	
Club	Season	Division	Apps	Goals	Apps	Goals	Apps	Goals	Apps	Goals	Apps	Goals
Blackpool	2016–17	League Two	0	0	0	0	0	0	0	0	0	0
Blackpool	2017–18	League One	0	0	0	0	1	0	1 (Note: Appearance in EFL Trophy)	0	2	0
Blackpool	Total		0	0	0	0	1	0	1	0	2	0
Marine (loan)	2016–17	Northern Premier League; Premier Division	1	0	0	0	—		1 (Note: Appearance in Northern Premier League Challenge Cup)	0	2	0
Warrington Town (loan)	2017–18	Northern Premier League; Premier Division	15	2	3	0	—		1 (Note: Appearance in FA Trophy)	0	19	2
Southport (loan)	2017–18	National League North	9	0	0	0	—		0	0	9	0
Leek Town (loan)	2017–18	Northern Premier League; Division One South	9	0	0	0	—		0	0	9	0
Norwich City	2018–19	Championship	0	0	0	0	0	0	—		0	0
Norwich City	2019–20	Premier League	0	0	0	0	0	0	—		0	0
Norwich City	2020–21	Championship	0	0	0	0	0	0	—		0	0
Norwich City	Total		0	0	0	0	0	0	0	0	0	0
FC United of Manchester (loan)	2018–19	National League North	7	0	0	0	—		0	0	7	0
Tampa Bay Rowdies (loan)	2019	USL Championship	35	1	2	0	—		1 (Note: Appearance in USL Championship Playoffs)	0	38	1
Yeovil Town (loan)	2019–20	National League	0	0	0	0	—		1	0	1	0
Kidderminster Harriers (loan)	2020–21	National League North	15	0	1	0	—		0	0	16	0
Kidderminster Harriers	2021–22	National League North	42	0	1	0	—		0	0	43	0
Kidderminster Harriers	2022–23	National League North	41	1	0	0	—		0	0	41	1
Kidderminster Harriers	2023–24	National League	42	1	1	0	—		0	0	43	1
Kidderminster Harriers	2024–25	National League North	46	1	3	0	—		4	0	53	1
Kidderminster Harriers	Total		186	3	6	0	0	0	4	0	196	3
Woking	2025–26	National League	46	0	2	0	—		8 (Note: Four Appearances in National League Cup, Four appearances in FA Trophy)	0	56	0
Woking	2026–27	National League	3	0	1	0	—		3 (Note: 2 Appearance(s) in National League Cup, 1 Appearance in Surrey Senior Cup)	0	7	0
Woking	Total		49	0	3	0	0	0	11	0	63	0
Career total			310	6	14	0	1	0	20	0	345	6

== Honours ==
Kidderminster Harriers

- National League North play-offs: 2022-23
