= 2011 UEFA European Under-21 Championship final =

2011 UEFA European Under-21 Championship Final
- Event: 2011 UEFA European Under-21 Championship
Switzerland	Spain
(Switzerland)	(Spain)
0	2
- Date: 25 June 2011
- Venue: Aarhus Stadion, Aarhus
- Man of the Match: Thiago (Spain)
- Referee: Paolo Tagliavento (Italy)
- Attendance: 16,110
- Weather: Partly cloudy night 16 °C (61 °F); 50% humidity

The 2011 UEFA European Under-21 Championship Final was a football match that took place on 25 June 2011 at the Aarhus Stadion in Aarhus, Denmark, to determine the winner of the 2011 UEFA European Under-21 Championship. Spain defeated Switzerland with 2–0, after goals from Ander Herrera and Thiago.

== Route to the final ==
Switzerland
Round
Spain
Opponent
Result
Group stage
Opponent
Result
Denmark
1–0
Match 1
England
1–1
Iceland
2–0
Match 2
Czech Republic
2–0
Belarus
3–0
Match 3
Ukraine
3–0

Team	Pld	W	D	L	GF	GA	GD	Pts
Switzerland	3	3	0	0	6	0	+6	9
Belarus	3	1	0	2	3	5	−2	3
Iceland	3	1	0	2	3	5	−2	3
Denmark	3	1	0	2	3	5	−2	3

Final standings

Team	Pld	W	D	L	GF	GA	GD	Pts
Spain	3	2	1	0	6	1	+5	7
Czech Republic	3	2	0	1	4	4	0	6
England	3	0	2	1	2	3	−1	2
Ukraine	3	0	1	2	1	5	−4	1

Opponent
Result
Knockout stage
Opponent
Result
Czech Republic
1–0 (aet)
Semi-finals
Belarus
3–1 (aet)

== Pre-match ==
=== Venue ===
After a decision made by UEFA in October 2009, the Aarhus Stadion in Aarhus, Denmark, the largest stadium of the four 2011 European Under-21 Championship venues, was selected as the official venue for the final.

=== Officials ===
Paolo Tagliavento of the Italian Football Federation (FIGC) was named by UEFA as the official referee of the final. Having worked as a fourth official in November 2004, he was included in the international referees' list in 2007. The same year, in May, Tagliavento officiated his first match, the 2007 European Under-19 Championship Group 1 elite qualifier match between Germany and Republic of Ireland. He was also a referee at the 2007 UEFA Regions' Cup, where he was in charge of three matches, including the final between South-East Region and Lower Silesia. In July 2007, Tagliavento took charge of his first Champions League match, the 2007–08 Champions League first qualifying round match between Linfield and Elfsborg. He was given his first professional Champions League match in December 2010, the 2010–11 Champions League Group H match between Arsenal and Partizan. Ahead of the final, Tagliavento had officiated two 2011 European Under-21 Championship matches, one from Group A between Denmark and Belarus and the other from Group B, between Spain and Czech Republic, as well as a total of 17 UEFA Cup and Europa League matches, including a role as an assistant referee in the 2010 Europa League Final between Atlético Madrid and Fulham.

Tagliavento was joined by assistant referees Damien MacGraith from the Football Association of Ireland and Vytautas Šimkus from the Lithuanian Football Federation, with fourth official Robert Schörgenhofer representing the Austrian Football Association. MacGrath had earlier been given the role as an assistant referee in two Group A matches, Switzerland and Iceland, and Iceland and hosts Denmark and one Group B match, between Czech Republic and Ukraine, and also the second semi-final match between Switzerland and Czech Republic, while Šimkus was tasked with two Group A matches, Denmark and Switzerland and Switzerland and Belarus and one Group B match, between Ukraine and England, as well as the first semi-final match between Spain and Belarus. Prior to the final, Schörgenhofer was also the fourth official of the Group B match between Ukraine and Spain, as well as handling the second Group A match between Denmark and Switzerland, the third Group B match between Czech Republic and Spain, and the semi-final match between Switzerland and Czech Republic.

=== Match ball ===
Adidas Speedcell was the official match ball selected for the final. The ball was used throughout the tournament, and features a futuristic red and white coloured design, in honour of the Denmark flag. It features eleven lines, which denotes the eleven players on the pitch, with the official competition emblem located between the ball.

=== Opening ceremony ===
The opening ceremony consisted of volunteers were seen holding balloons, and then releasing them throughout the sky over the stadium, A field march was also performed, as they were seen holding flags, which pictured every participating team in the tournament.

== Match ==
=== Details ===
25 June 2011
20:45

Switzerland	0–2	Spain
	Report	Herrera 41'; Thiago 81'

Aarhus Stadion, Aarhus
Attendance: 16,110
Referee: Paolo Tagliavento (Italy)

Switzerland	Spain

GK	1	Yann Sommer (c)
RB	2	Philippe Koch
CB	15	Timm Klose
CB	5	Jonathan Rossini
LB	23	Gaetano Berardi	(yellow card) 61'
DM	6	Fabian Lustenberger	(yellow card) 16'
RM	10	Xherdan Shaqiri
CM	14	Granit Xhaka		(substituted off) 67'
CM	9	Fabian Frei		(substituted off) 54'
LM	7	Innocent Emeghara		(substituted off) 53'
CF	11	Admir Mehmedi
Substitutions:
FW	19	Mario Gavranović		(substituted on) 53'
MF	18	Amir Abrashi		(substituted on) 54'
MF	4	Pajtim Kasami		(substituted on) 67'
Manager:
Pierluigi Tami

GK	13	David de Gea	(yellow card) 90+4'
RB	12	Martín Montoya
CB	20	Alberto Botía
CB	3	Álvaro Domínguez
LB	17	Dídac Vilà
DM	4	Javi Martínez (c)	(yellow card) 77'
RM	10	Juan Mata
CM	19	Thiago
CM	18	Ander Herrera		(substituted off) 90'
LM	22	Iker Muniain		(substituted off) 85'
CF	7	Adrián		(substituted off) 80'
Substitutions:
FW	6	Jeffrén		(substituted on) 80'
MF	8	Dani Parejo		(substituted on) 85'
MF	11	Diego Capel		(substituted on) 90'
Manager:
Luis Milla

Man of the Match:
Thiago (Spain)

Assistant referees:
Damien MacGraith (Republic of Ireland)
Vytautas Šimkus (Lithuania)
Fourth official:
Robert Schörgenhofer (Austria)
