= Billy Johnson (footballer) =

English association football player

Personal information
- Full name: William Robert Johnson
- Date of birth: 25 September 1999 (age 27)
- Place of birth: Great Yarmouth, England
- Position: Goalkeeper

Team information
- Current team: Leiston

Youth career
- Beccles Town

Senior career*
Years	Team	Apps	(Gls)
2016–2017	Beccles Town	1	(0)
2017–2018	Norwich United	5	(0)
2018–2020	Norwich City	0	(0)
2018–2019	→ Lowestoft Town (loan)		
2020	→ Braintree Town (loan)	10	(0)
2020–2021	Stevenage	0	(0)
2021–2022	Braintree Town	32	(0)
2022–2023	Gloucester City	2	(0)
2023	Braintree Town	1	(0)
2023	→ Leiston (dual-reg.)	1	(0)
2023–2024	Kettering Town	19	(0)
2024–	Leiston	3	(0)
- * Club domestic league appearances and goals as of 20:39, 20 March 2024 (UTC)

William Robert Johnson (born 25 September 1999) is a professional footballer who plays as a goalkeeper for Leiston.

Having begun his career at local club Beccles Town, Johnson joined Norwich City's under-23 set-up in August 2018 from Norwich United following a successful trial. He remained at Norwich for two years, spending time on loan at Lowestoft Town and Braintree Town of the National League South during the 2019–20 season. Johnson signed for Stevenage in July 2020 and spent one season with the club, before returning to Braintree Town on two different occasions between spells with Gloucester City and Leiston. In July 2023, he signed for Kettering Town, before returning to Leiston on a permanent basis in February 2024.

== Career ==
Johnson spent the majority of his youth career at Beccles Town, progressing through the various age groups for his local club. He later joined the Community Sports Foundation's Football and Education Programme in Norwich, which allows young footballers to continue their academic studies alongside a full-time football training programme. The programme was delivered by former Norwich City footballers Adam Drury, Ryan Jarvis and Simon Lappin. Towards the end of the 2017–18 season, Johnson went on trial with Peterborough United. He was offered the opportunity to train with Norwich City during pre-season ahead of the 2018–19 season, with a view to earning a full-time contract. Although Johnson was injured early-on during the trial, he was offered a one-year contract, with the option of a further year, which he signed on 6 August 2018.

Upon signing for Norwich City from Norwich United, he was placed in the club's under-23 team to continue his development. Norwich took up the option of extending Johnson's contract for a further year in 2019. He played three times for the under-23 team during the first half of the 2019–20 season, which included two appearances in the EFL Trophy. Johnson joined National League South club Braintree Town on loan for the remainder of the 2019–20 season, making 10 appearances during the loan agreement. His contract at Norwich expired in June 2020.

Johnson signed for League Two club Stevenage on 22 July 2020. He made his professional debut in the club's 3–2 defeat to Milton Keynes Dons at Broadhall Way in the EFL Trophy on 6 October 2020. He was released by Stevenage at the end of the 2020–21 season.

Ahead of the 2021–22 campaign, following his release from Stevenage, Johnson returned to Braintree Town on a permanent basis. He went onto feature 34 times in all competitions before departing the club at the end of the season before he eventually joined Gloucester City in December 2022. Johnson returned to Braintree on a third occasion in March 2022, providing competition to Jack Sims ahead of their play-off push. He immediately dual-registered with Leiston following the move.

On 9 July 2023, Johnson agreed to join Southern League Premier Division Central side, Kettering Town. On 24 February 2024, he returned to Leiston, joining on a permanent basis.

== Career statistics ==
As of match played 9 March 2024

Appearances and goals by club, season and competition
Club	Season	League			FA Cup		EFL Cup		Other		Total	
Club	Season	Division	Apps	Goals	Apps	Goals	Apps	Goals	Apps	Goals	Apps	Goals
Beccles Town	2016–17	Anglian Combination Division One	1	0	—		—		0	0	1	0
Norwich United	2016–17	Isthmian League Division One North	0	0	0	0	—		0	0	0	0
Norwich United	2017–18	Isthmian League North Division	5	0	0	0	—		0	0	5	0
Norwich United	Total		5	0	0	0	—		0	0	5	0
Norwich City	2018–19	Championship	0	0	0	0	0	0	—		0	0
Norwich City	2019–20	Premier League	0	0	0	0	0	0	—		0	0
Norwich City	Total		0	0	0	0	0	0	—		0	0
Lowestoft Town (loan)	2018–19	Southern League Premier Division Central	No data currently available									
Norwich City U23	2019–20	—			—		—		2 (Note: Appearance in EFL Trophy)	0	2	0
Braintree Town (loan)	2019–20	National League South	10	0	—		—		—		10	0
Stevenage	2020–21	League Two	0	0	0	0	0	0	1	0	1	0
Braintree Town	2021–22	National League South	32	0	0	0	—		2 (Note: Appearance in FA Trophy)	0	34	0
Gloucester City	2022–23	National League North	2	0	—		—		1	0	3	0
Braintree Town	2022–23	National League South	1	0	—		—		0	0	1	0
Leiston (dual-reg.)	2022–23	Southern League Premier Division Central	1	0	—		—		0	0	1	0
Kettering Town	2023–24	Southern League Premier Division Central	19	0	2	0	—		1	0	22	0
Leiston	2023–24	Southern League Premier Division Central	3	0	—		—		—		3	0
Career total			74	0	2	0	0	0	7	0	83	0
