= Jamal Lewis (footballer) =

Footballer (born 1998)

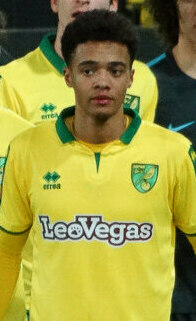
- Lewis with Norwich City in 2019

Personal information
- Full name: Jamal Piaras Lewis
- Date of birth: 25 January 1998 (age 28)
- Place of birth: Luton, England
- Height: 5 ft 10 in (1.78 m)
- Position: Left-back

Youth career
- 2009–2013: Luton Town
- 2014–2016: Norwich City

Senior career*
Years	Team	Apps	(Gls)
2016–2020	Norwich City	92	(1)
2020–2025	Newcastle United	31	(0)
2023–2024	→ Watford (loan)	36	(0)
2024–2025	→ São Paulo (loan)	6	(0)
2025–2026	Preston North End	14	(0)

International career^{‡}
2016	Northern Ireland U19	3	(0)
2017	Northern Ireland U21	1	(0)
2018–	Northern Ireland	40	(0)
- * Club domestic league appearances and goals as of 11:12, 20 February 2026 (UTC) ‡ National team caps and goals as of 22:13, 17 November 2025 (UTC)

Jamal Piaras Lewis (born 25 January 1998) is a professional footballer who plays as a left-back. Born in England, he represents the Northern Ireland national team.

== Early and personal life ==
Jamal Piaras Lewis was born on 25 January 1998, in Luton, England. He is of Northern Irish descent through his mother. When younger, Lewis was a talented athlete competing at national level for his age-group over 800m and 1500m. He represented England Schools in athletics and finished second in the English Schools' U17 cross-country in 2014.

== Club career ==
=== Luton Town ===
Lewis started his professional football career as a youth player with his home-town club Luton Town, with whom he won the Aarau Masters, a European 5-a-side Under-11 Championship in 2009. He left Luton Town in 2013 to focus on his prospects as a national-level 800-metre runner.

=== Norwich City ===
Lewis returned to professional football in 2014, signing for Norwich City.

During the 2016–17 season, he played for the Norwich U23 team. At the end of the 2016–17 season, Lewis signed a new contract until 2021. In December 2017, Lewis made his senior debut for Norwich City against Brentford, coming on as a substitute for Marco Stiepermann. On Boxing Day 2017, he made his first start for Norwich against Birmingham City. He scored his first senior goal in the 93rd minute of an FA Cup third round replay against Chelsea in January 2018.

Lewis was named the EFL Young Player of the Month for September 2018, and in October 2018, he was rewarded with a new long-term contract which ran until June 2023.

In March 2019 he was named in the 2018–19 PFA Championship Team of the Year, alongside team-mates Max Aarons and Teemu Pukki. Lewis made 28 appearances for Norwich City in the 2019–20 Premier League. In August 2020, Norwich rejected a £10 million bid from Liverpool for Lewis.

=== Newcastle United ===
On 8 September 2020, Lewis signed a five-year contract with Premier League side Newcastle United. His performances with the club were often unconvincing and he quickly fell out of favour, resulting in his exclusion from the 25-player squad list for the remainder of the season in January 2022.

==== Loan to Watford ====
On 27 July 2023, Championship side Watford announced the signing of Lewis on a season-long loan from Newcastle, with a future option to make the move permanent if obligations were met.

==== Loan to São Paulo and return to Newcastle ====
On 1 September 2024, Northern Ireland manager Michael O'Neill revealed that Lewis had travelled to Brazil to complete a move to Campeonato Brasileiro Série A side São Paulo. Two days later, Newcastle announced Lewis' move to São Paulo on a loan deal until the end of the season, with an option to make the move permanent.

After an ankle injury that occurred during a training session on international duty, on 15 November 2024, Newcastle United and São Paulo mutually agreed to terminate his loan contract in January 2025, and he returned to Newcastle.

On 9 June 2025, it was announced that Newcastle would release Lewis at the end of the season when his contract would expire on 30 June.

=== Preston North End ===
On 31 October 2025, Lewis joined Championship club Preston North End on a free transfer, signing a short-term contract until 30 December 2025. On 31 December, he signed a new contract until the end of the season. On 19 May 2026, the club announced he was being released when his contract ended on 30 June.

== International career ==
Born and raised in England, Lewis was eligible to play for Northern Ireland through his mother, who was born in Belfast. He first represented the national team in 2016, making three appearances for the U19 team. In June 2017, he was called up to the U21 team and made his U21 debut against Estonia.

In March 2018, he was called up to the Northern Irish senior squad for the first time. He made his senior international debut in a 2–1 friendly win over South Korea on 24 March 2018.

On 9 October 2021, Lewis was sent off in the first half in an eventual 2–0 loss to Switzerland. His first yellow was for a rash challenge on Breel Embolo, but his second was for time-wasting after he struggled to find a teammate from a throw-in. Manager Ian Baraclough said that the decision to send Lewis off was "diabolical" and it changed the course of the game.

== Career statistics ==
=== Club ===
As of match played 20 February 2026

Appearances and goals by club, season and competition
Club	Season	League			National cup (Note: Includes FA Cup)		League cup (Note: Includes EFL Cup)		Other		Total	
Club	Season	Division	Apps	Goals	Apps	Goals	Apps	Goals	Apps	Goals	Apps	Goals
Norwich City	2016–17	Championship	0	0	0	0	0	0	—		0	0
Norwich City	2017–18	Championship	22	0	2	1	0	0	—		24	1
Norwich City	2018–19	Championship	42	0	0	0	2	0	—		44	0
Norwich City	2019–20	Premier League	28	1	4	0	0	0	—		32	1
Norwich City	Total		92	1	6	1	2	0	—		100	2
Newcastle United	2020–21	Premier League	24	0	0	0	2	0	—		26	0
Newcastle United	2021–22	Premier League	5	0	0	0	1	0	—		6	0
Newcastle United	2022–23	Premier League	2	0	1	0	1	0	—		4	0
Newcastle United	2023–24	Premier League	0	0	0	0	0	0	—		0	0
Newcastle United	2024–25	Premier League	0	0	0	0	0	0	—		0	0
Newcastle United	Total		31	0	1	0	4	0	—		36	0
Watford (loan)	2023–24	Championship	36	0	2	0	0	0	—		38	0
São Paulo (loan)	2024	Série A	6	0	0	0	—		0	0	6	0
Preston North End	2025–26	Championship	14	0	0	0	0	0	—		14	0
Career total			179	1	9	1	6	0	0	0	194	2

=== International ===
As of match played 17 November 2025

Appearances and goals by national team and year
National team	Year	Apps	Goals
Northern Ireland	2018	6	0
Northern Ireland	2019	6	0
Northern Ireland	2020	6	0
Northern Ireland	2021	8	0
Northern Ireland	2022	2	0
Northern Ireland	2023	6	0
Northern Ireland	2024	5	0
Northern Ireland	2025	1	0
Total		40	0

== Honours ==
Norwich City

- EFL Championship: 2018–19

Individual

- EFL Young Player of the Month: September 2018
- EFL Team of the Season: 2018–19
- PFA Team of the Year: 2018–19 Championship
