= 2018–19 Norwich City F.C. season =

Norwich City
2018–19 season
- Chairman: Ed Balls (until 26 December)
- Head coach: Daniel Farke
- Stadium: Carrow Road
- Championship: 1st (promoted)
- FA Cup: Third round
- EFL Cup: Fourth round
- Top goalscorer: League: Teemu Pukki (29); All: Teemu Pukki (30)
- Highest home attendance: 27,040 vs. Ipswich Town (10 February 2019)
- Lowest home attendance: 11,687 vs. Stevenage (14 August 2018)
- Average home league attendance: 26,383
- Biggest win: Sheffield Wednesday 0–4 Norwich City (3 November 2018); Bolton Wanderers 0–4 Norwich City (16 February 2019); Norwich City 4–0 Queens Park Rangers (6 April 2019)
- Biggest defeat: Norwich City 0–3 Leeds United (25 August 2018)
Home colours	Away colours	Third colours

The 2018–19 season was Norwich City's third consecutive season in the Championship. During the season they participated in the Championship, FA Cup and EFL Cup.

The season covered the period from 1 July 2018 to 30 June 2019.

== Transfers ==
=== Transfers in ===
Date from	Position	Nationality	Name	From	Fee	Ref.
1 July 2018	CF	(England)	Mason Bloomfield	(England) Dagenham & Redbridge	Free	
1 July 2018	AM	(Argentina)	Emiliano Buendía	(Spain) Getafe	Undisclosed	
1 July 2018	DF	(England)	Ciaren Jones	(England) Luton Town	Free	
1 July 2018	CM	(Germany)	Moritz Leitner	(Germany) Augsburg	Undisclosed	
1 July 2018	RW	(England)	Ben Marshall	(England) Wolverhampton Wanderers	Undisclosed	
1 July 2018	CF	(Finland)	Teemu Pukki	(Denmark) Brøndby	Free	
1 July 2018	LB	(England)	Caleb Richards	(England) Blackpool	Free	
1 July 2018	DM	(England)	Tom Scully	(England) Everton	Free	
24 July 2018	LM	(England)	Josh Coley	(England) Hitchin Town	Undisclosed	
24 July 2018	GK	(Netherlands)	Tim Krul	(England) Brighton & Hove Albion	Free	
6 August 2018	GK	(England)	Billy Johnson	(England) Beccles Town	Free	
22 January 2019	CM	(Republic of Ireland)	William Hondermarck	(Republic of Ireland) Drogheda United	Undisclosed	
29 January 2019	CB	(England)	Akin Famewo	(England) Luton Town	Undisclosed	
31 January 2019	LB	(Germany)	Philip Heise	(Germany) Dynamo Dresden	Undisclosed	
1 February 2019	GK	(England)	Nicholas Hayes	(England) Dunstable Town	Free transfer	
1 February 2019	FW	(England)	Kole Lambert	(England) Basford United	Undisclosed	

=== Transfers out ===
Date from	Position	Nationality	Name	To	Fee	Ref.
1 July 2018	DM	(The Gambia)	Ebou Adams	(England) Ebbsfleet United	Free	
1 July 2018	AM	(Republic of Ireland)	Wes Hoolahan	West Bromwich Albion	Released	
1 July 2018	GK	(England)	Paul Jones	(England) Fleetwood Town	Released	
1 July 2018	AM	(England)	James Maddison	(England) Leicester City	Undisclosed	
1 July 2018	LW	(England)	Josh Murphy	(Wales) Cardiff City	Undisclosed	
1 July 2018	DM	(England)	Henry Pollock	(England) Lowestoft Town	Free transfer	
1 July 2018	RB	(England)	Louis Ramsay	(England) Leicester City	Released	
1 July 2018	DM	(England)	Emersson Sambu	Free agent	Released	
1 July 2018	RW	(Wales)	Marley Watkins	(England) Bristol City	Undisclosed	
2 July 2018	RB	(England)	Ayo Tanimowo	(England) Brighton & Hove Albion	Undisclosed	
27 July 2018	CB	(Democratic Republic of the Congo)	Michee Efete	(England) Maidstone United	Free transfer	
30 July 2018	CB	(England)	Owen Wallis	(England) Tamworth	Free transfer	
15 August 2018	GK	(England)	Jake Hallett	(England) Salisbury	Free transfer	
31 August 2018	CB	(Scotland)	Russell Martin	(England) Walsall	Mutual Consent	
18 January 2019	GK	(England)	Remi Matthews	(England) Bolton Wanderers	Undisclosed	
26 January 2019	LW	(England)	Jaden Brissett	(England) Brentford	Free transfer	

=== Loans in ===
Date from	Position	Nationality	Name	From	Until	Ref.
2 July 2018	RB	(Germany)	Felix Passlack	(Germany) Borussia Dortmund	31 May 2019	
10 July 2018	CF	(Scotland)	Jordan Rhodes	(England) Sheffield Wednesday	31 May 2019	

=== Loans out ===
Date from	Position	Nationality	Name	To	Until	Ref.
1 July 2018	CF	(England)	Mason Bloomfield	(Scotland) Hamilton Academical	3 January 2019	
1 July 2018	CB	(Germany)	Marcel Franke	(Germany) Darmstadt	31 May 2019	
1 July 2018	LW	(Nigeria)	Diallang Jaiyesimi	(England) Yeovil Town	31 January 2019	
1 July 2018	CM	(Greece)	Savvas Mourgos	(Netherlands) Dordrecht	31 August 2018	
3 July 2018	CF	(England)	Tristan Abrahams	(England) Exeter City	30 January 2019	
6 July 2018	AM	(Scotland)	Steven Naismith	(Scotland) Hearts	31 May 2019	
13 July 2018	CM	(England)	Adam Phillips	(Scotland) Hamilton Academical	30 August 2018	
19 July 2018	RW	(Netherlands)	Yanic Wildschut	(England) Bolton Wanderers	31 May 2019	
25 July 2018	CB	(England)	Sean Raggett	(England) Rotherham United	31 May 2019	
12 August 2018	GK	(England)	Remi Matthews	(England) Bolton Wanderers	5 January 2019	
20 August 2018	LB	(England)	James Husband	(England) Fleetwood Town	31 May 2019	
27 November 2018	DM	(England)	Adam Phillips	(Netherlands) FC Dordrecht	31 May 2019	
30 November 2018	LB	(England)	Caleb Richards	(England) FC United of Manchester	6 January 2019	
1 December 2018	CM	(England)	Devonte Aransibia	(England) Billericay Town	6 January 2019	
1 January 2019	LW	(England)	Matt Jarvis	(England) Walsall	31 May 2019	
4 January 2019	CF	(England)	Mason Bloomfield	(England) AFC Fylde	31 May 2019	
7 January 2019	RM	(Republic of Ireland)	Simon Power	(Netherlands) FC Dordrecht	31 May 2019	
16 January 2019	RM	(England)	Ben Marshall	(England) Millwall	31 May 2019	
17 January 2019	CB	(England)	Timi Odusina	(England) AFC Fylde	31 May 2019	
22 January 2019	CF	(Portugal)	Nélson Oliveira	(England) Reading	31 May 2019	
31 January 2019	CF	(England)	Tristan Abrahams	(England) Yeovil Town	31 May 2019	
4 February 2019	LB	(England)	Caleb Richards	(United States) Tampa Bay Rowdies	30 November 2019	
19 March 2019	CF	(England)	Anthony Spyrou	(Wales) Wrexham	31 May 2019	

== Pre-season friendlies ==
On 16 May 2018, SC Paderborn announced a pre-season friendly with Norwich City was to take place on 15 July. The club themselves confirmed the SC Paderborn friendly on 17 May, whilst also announcing a friendly with Union Berlin. Other friendly opponents include King's Lynn Town, Lincoln City, Crawley Town, Luton Town and Charlton Athletic.

6 July 2018 Friendly	King's Lynn Town	1–2	Norwich City	King's Lynn
19:30 BST	Hilliard 49'	Report at the Wayback Machine (archived 6 July 2018)	Aransibia 71'; Idah 73'	Stadium: The Walks; Attendance: 1,146

10 July 2018 Friendly	Lincoln City	1–3	Norwich City	Lincoln
19:45 BST	Raggett 86' (o.g.)	Report at the Wayback Machine (archived 7 August 2020)	McLean 41'; Hernandez 54'; Thompson 58'	Stadium: Sincil Bank; Attendance: 2,645; Referee: Josh Smith

12 July 2018 Friendly	Norwich City	2–0	Crawley Town	Colney
16:30 BST	Srbeny 71'; Stiepermann 79'	Report at the Wayback Machine (archived 24 September 2020)

15 July 2018 Friendly	SC Paderborn	2–3	Norwich City	Gütersloh, Germany
13:00 CEST	Michel 2'; Klement 40'	Report at the Wayback Machine (archived 7 August 2020)	Srbeny 51'; Pukki 58', 61'	Stadium: Energieversumstadion; Referee: Sven Waschitzki

17 July 2018 Friendly	Union Berlin	2–1	Norwich City	Delbrück, Germany
18:00 CEST	Redondo 41'; Klose 68' (o.g.)	Report at the Wayback Machine (archived 7 August 2020)	Rhodes 58'	Stadium: Laumeskamp Delbrück; Referee: Henrik Bramlage

19 July 2018 Friendly	Wolfsburg	1–1	Norwich City	Barsinghausen, Germany
18:10 CEST	Guilavogui 79'	Report at the Wayback Machine (archived 26 September 2020)	Hernandez 6'; Klose (yellow card) 59'; McLean (yellow card) 77'	Stadium: August Wenzel Stadium Platz 1 Referee: Henrik Bramlage

25 July 2018 Friendly	Luton Town	1–3	Norwich City	Luton
19:45 BST	Gambin 57'; Bradley (yellow card) 68'	Report at the Wayback Machine (archived 28 January 2021)	Hanley 10'; Rhodes 13' (pen.); Buendía (yellow card) 31'; Pukki 45'; Thompson (yellow card) 59'	Stadium: Kenilworth Road; Attendance: 2,957; Referee: Alan Young

28 July 2018 Friendly	Charlton Athletic	1–0	Norwich City	Charlton
15:00 BST	Forster-Caskey 58'	Report at the Wayback Machine (archived 4 March 2021)		Stadium: The Valley

== Competitions ==
=== Overview ===
Competition	First match	Last match	Starting round	Final position	Record							
Competition	First match	Last match	Starting round	Final position	Pld	W	D	L	GF	GA	GD	Win %
EFL Championship	4 August 2018	5 May 2019	Matchday 1	Winners	46	27	13	6	93	57	+36	58.70
FA Cup	5 January 2019		Third round	Third round	1	0	0	1	0	1	−1	0.00
EFL Cup	14 August 2018	30 October 2018	First round	Fourth round	4	3	0	1	11	7	+4	75.00
Total					51	30	13	8	104	65	+39	58.82

Source: Soccerway

=== Championship ===
==== League table ====
Pos	Team	Pld	W	D	L	GF	GA	GD	Pts	Promotion, qualification or relegation
1	Norwich City (C, P)	46	27	13	6	93	57	+36	94	Promotion to the Premier League
2	Sheffield United (P)	46	26	11	9	78	41	+37	89	Promotion to the Premier League
3	Leeds United	46	25	8	13	73	50	+23	83	Qualification for Championship play-offs (Note: Four teams play for one spot and promotion to the Premier League.)
4	West Bromwich Albion	46	23	11	12	87	62	+25	80	Qualification for Championship play-offs
5	Aston Villa (O, P)	46	20	16	10	82	61	+21	76	Qualification for Championship play-offs
6	Derby County	46	20	14	12	69	54	+15	74	Qualification for Championship play-offs

Source: Sky Sports Archived 25 September 2019 at the Wayback Machine
Rules for classification: 1) Points; 2) Goal difference; 3) Number of goals scored; 4) Head-to-head results
(C) Champions; (O) Play-off winners; (P) Promoted

==== Results summary ====
Overall								Home						Away					
Pld	W	D	L	GF	GA	GD	Pts	W	D	L	GF	GA	GD	W	D	L	GF	GA	GD
46	27	13	6	93	57	+36	94	15	4	4	51	34	+17	12	9	2	42	23	+19

Last updated: 5 May 2019.
Source: BBC

==== Results by matchday ====
Matchday	1	2	3	4	5	6	7	8	9	10	11	12	13	14	15	16	17	18	19	20	21	22	23	24	25	26	27	28	29	30	31	32	33	34	35	36	37	38	39	40	41	42	43	44	45	46
Ground	A	H	A	H	H	A	H	A	A	H	A	H	A	H	H	A	H	A	A	H	H	A	A	H	H	A	A	H	H	A	H	A	A	H	A	H	H	A	A	H	H	A	H	A	H	A
Result	D	L	L	W	L	D	W	W	W	W	D	L	W	W	W	W	W	W	D	W	W	D	W	D	L	D	D	W	D	W	W	L	W	W	W	W	W	W	W	W	D	D	D	D	W	W
Position	12	17	21	15	17	17	16	12	11	5	5	8	6	4	4	2	1	1	1	1	1	2	2	2	2	2	3	2	2	1	1	2	1	1	1	1	1	1	1	1	1	1	1	1	1	1

Updated to match(es) played on 5 May 2019. Source: Statto.com
A = Away; H = Home; W = Win; D = Draw; L = Loss

==== Matches ====
On 21 June 2018, the league fixtures were announced.

4 August 2018 1	Birmingham City	2–2	Norwich City	Birmingham
15:00 BST	Maghoma 56'; Solomon-Otabor 89'	Report	Hernández 83', 90+4' (yellow card) 84'; Marshall (yellow card) 86'; McLean (yellow card) 86'	Stadium: St Andrew's; Attendance: 22,677; Referee: Peter Bankes

11 August 2018 2	Norwich City	3–4	West Bromwich Albion	Norwich
15:00 BST	Rhodes 24'; Pukki 70'; Hanley 82'	Report	Rodriguez 33' (pen.), 47'; Barnes 65'; Robson-Kanu 79'	Stadium: Carrow Road; Attendance: 25,144; Referee: Lee Mason

18 August 2018 3	Sheffield United	2–1	Norwich City	Sheffield
15:00 BST	Egan 9'; McGoldrick (yellow card) 83'; Basham (yellow card) 90+1'; Sharp 90+3'	Report	Rhodes 26'; Pukki (yellow card) 35'; Trybull (yellow card) 63'	Stadium: Bramall Lane; Attendance: 23,850; Referee: Darren Bond

22 August 2018 4	Norwich City	2–0	Preston North End	Norwich
19:45 BST	Leitner (yellow card) 65'; Pukki 79'; Tettey 86' (yellow card) 87'	Report	Pearson (yellow card) 60'; Browne (yellow card) 84'	Stadium: Carrow Road; Attendance: 24,936; Referee: Gavin Ward

25 August 2018 5	Norwich City	0–3	Leeds United	Norwich
15:00 BST	Trybull (yellow card) 50'	Report	Klich 21'; Alioski 26'; Ayling (yellow card) 62'; Hernández 67'; Berardi (yellow card) 90+3'	Stadium: Carrow Road; Attendance: 25,944; Referee: Simon Hooper

2 September 2018 6	Ipswich Town	1–1	Norwich City	Ipswich
12:00 BST	Chambers (yellow card) 26'; Graham (yellow card) 42'; Edwards 57'	Report	Godfrey (yellow card) 49'; Leitner 71'	Stadium: Portman Road; Attendance: 25,690; Referee: Robert Jones

15 September 2018 7	Norwich City	1–0	Middlesbrough	Norwich
15:00 BST	Pukki 58'; Klose (yellow card) 59'; Stiepermann (yellow card) 62'; Leitner (yellow card) 88'; Rhodes (yellow card) 89'	Report	Clayton (yellow card) 42'	Stadium: Carrow Road; Attendance: 24,642; Referee: James Linington

19 September 2018 8	Reading	1–2	Norwich City	Reading
20:00 BST	Meite (yellow card) 27'; Gunter (yellow card) 54'; Böðvarsson 72'	Report	Pukki 14'; Vrančić 73' (yellow card) 76'; Aarons (yellow card) 81'; Tettey (yellow card) 90+4'	Stadium: Madejski Stadium; Attendance: 12,822; Referee: Tim Robinson

22 September 2018 9	Queens Park Rangers	0–1	Norwich City	Shepherd's Bush
17:30 BST		Report	Aarons (yellow card) 61'; Lewis (yellow card) 67'; Pukki 71'	Stadium: Loftus Road; Attendance: 12,843; Referee: Darren Bond

29 September 2018 10	Norwich City	1–0	Wigan Athletic	Norwich
15:00 BST	Aarons (yellow card) 26'; Vrančić 86' (pen.)	Report	Windass (yellow card) 45'; Walton (yellow card) 86'; Gibson (yellow card) 86'	Stadium: Carrow Road; Attendance: 25,034; Referee: Gavin Ward

3 October 2018 11	Derby County	1–1	Norwich City	Derby
19:45 BST	Bogle (yellow card) 61'; Bryson 86'	Report	Zimmermann (yellow card) 45+1'; Lewis (yellow card) 54'; Klose 69'	Stadium: Pride Park; Attendance: 24,236; Referee: Geoff Eltringham

6 October 2018 12	Norwich City	0–1	Stoke City	Norwich
15:00 BST		Report	Klose 35' (o.g.); Etebo (yellow card) 83'	Stadium: Carrow Road; Attendance: 24,992; Referee: David Coote

20 October 2018 13	Nottingham Forest	1–2	Norwich City	West Bridgford
15:00 BST	Grabban 5'; Carvalho (yellow card) 45+3'; Pantilimon (yellow card) 50'; Watson (yellow card) 71'	Report	Zimmermann (yellow card) 45+2'; Klose 60', 84'; Rhodes (yellow card) 90+1'; Cantwell (yellow card) 90+3'	Stadium: City Ground; Attendance: 29,427; Referee: Keith Stroud

23 October 2018 14	Norwich City	2–1	Aston Villa	Norwich
19:45 BST	Zimmermann (yellow card) 5'; Rhodes 54', 73'; Trybull (yellow card) 87'	Report	Chester 19'; Taylor (yellow card) 45'	Stadium: Carrow Road; Attendance: 24,977; Referee: Simon Hooper

27 October 2018 15	Norwich City	1–0	Brentford	Norwich
15:00 BST	Buendiá 34'	Report	Dalsgaard (yellow card) 5'	Stadium: Carrow Road; Attendance: 25,443; Referee: Oliver Langford

3 November 2018 16	Sheffield Wednesday	0–4	Norwich City	Sheffield
15:00 GMT	Bannan (yellow card) 45+2'; Nuhiu (yellow card) 70'; João (yellow card) 74'; Penney (yellow card) 77'	Report	Buendía (yellow card) 45+2' (goal) 56'; Pukki 51', 62'; Leitner (yellow card) 61'; Srbeny 80'	Stadium: Hillsborough; Attendance: 23,425; Referee: Steve Martin

10 November 2018 17	Norwich City	4–3	Millwall	Norwich
15:00 GMT	Pukki 49', 90+7'; Leitner (yellow card) 66' (goal) 79'; Buendía (yellow card) 86'; Rhodes 90+2'	Report	Elliott 24' (yellow card) 69'; M. Wallace (yellow card) 37'; Hutchinson (yellow card) 51'; Leonard 81'; J. Wallace 83'; McLaughlin (yellow card) 90+3'; Amos (yellow card) 90+4'	Stadium: Carrow Road; Attendance: 26,289; Referee: Jeremy Simpson

24 November 2018 18	Swansea City	1–4	Norwich City	Swansea
15:00 GMT	James 41'	Report	van der Hoorn 16' (o.g.); Buendía 24'; Stiepermann 37'; Aarons (yellow card) 56'; Pukki 60'; Lewis (yellow card) 73'	Stadium: Liberty Stadium; Attendance: 18,780; Referee: Darren Bond

27 November 2018 19	Hull City	0–0	Norwich City	Kingston upon Hull
19:45 GMT		Report		Stadium: KCOM Stadium; Attendance: 11,420; Referee: Geoff Eltringham

1 December 2018 20	Norwich City	3–1	Rotherham United	Norwich
15:00 GMT	Cantwell 55'; Aarons 71'; Pukki 84'	Report	Towell 11'	Stadium: Carrow Road; Attendance: 25,858; Referee: Steve Martin

8 December 2018 21	Norwich City	3–2	Bolton Wanderers	Norwich
15:00 GMT	Vrančić 39' (yellow card) 86'; Stiepermann 59'; Pukki 90+3'	Report	Ameobi (yellow card) 14' (yellow-red card) 90+2' (goal) 63'; O'Neil (yellow card) 84'; Beevers 88'	Stadium: Carrow Road; Attendance: 25,811; Referee: Scott Duncan

15 December 2018 22	Bristol City	2–2	Norwich City	Bristol
17:30 GMT	Diedhiou 45'; O'Dowda 53'; Watkins (yellow card) 83'	Report	Stiepermann 39'; Tettey (yellow card) 41'; Buendía (yellow card) 71'; Aarons 78'; Godfrey (yellow card) 82'	Stadium: Ashton Gate; Attendance: 19,851; Referee: Roger East

22 December 2018 23	Blackburn Rovers	0–1	Norwich City	Blackburn
15:00 GMT	Evans (yellow card) 23'; Smallwood (yellow card) 29'	Report	Hernández (yellow card) 28'; Leitner (yellow card) 42'; Pukki 86'; Cantwell (yellow card) 90+3'	Stadium: Ewood Park; Attendance: 14,202; Referee: Darren England

26 December 2018 24	Norwich City	3–3	Nottingham Forest	Norwich
15:00 GMT	Stiepermann (yellow card) 27'; Godfrey (yellow card) 37'; Pukki (yellow card) 55'; Vrančić 77' (yellow card) 80'; Hernández 90+4', 90+8'	Report	Cash 45+1', 74'; Fox (yellow card) 49'; Robinson (yellow card) 51' (goal) 65'; Colback (yellow card) 67'; Pantilimon (yellow card) 90+7'	Stadium: Carrow Road; Attendance: 26,933; Referee: John Brooks

29 December 2018 25	Norwich City	3–4	Derby County	Norwich
15:00 GMT	Zimmermann (yellow card) 5'; Godfrey 25'; Pukki 31', 81'; Aarons (yellow card) 45+4'; Vrančić (yellow card) 62'	Report	Tomori 36'; Mount 45+2'; Evans (yellow card) 66'; Jozefzoon 87'; Marriott 90+2'; Holmes (yellow card) 90+6'; Wilson (yellow card) 90+6'	Stadium: Carrow Road; Attendance: 26,866; Referee: David Webb

1 January 2019 26	Brentford	1–1	Norwich City	Brentford
15:00 GMT	Jeanvier 22'; Sawyers (yellow card) 24'; Henry (yellow card) 66'; Dalsgaard (yellow card) 87'; Watkins (yellow card) 90'	Report	Zimmermann (yellow card) 20'; Aarons (yellow card) 45'; Klose (yellow card) 45+3' (goal) 83'	Stadium: Griffin Park; Attendance: 9,524; Referee: Gavin Ward

12 January 2019 27	West Bromwich Albion	1–1	Norwich City	West Bromwich
15:00 GMT	Gayle 12'; Barry (yellow card) 61'; Rodriguez (yellow card) 62'; Holgate (yellow card) 85'	Report	Tettey (yellow card) 56'; Buendía (yellow card) 62'; Rhodes 83'; Vrančić (yellow card) 90+4'; Krul (yellow card) 90+5'	Stadium: The Hawthorns; Attendance: 26,544; Referee: Darren England

18 January 2019 28	Norwich City	3–1	Birmingham City	Norwich
19:45 GMT	Pukki 12'; Vrančić 21'; Trybull 24'	Report	Adams 13'; Kieftenbeld (yellow card) 26'; Pedersen (yellow card) 28'; Gardner (yellow card) 79'; Morrison (yellow card) 86'	Stadium: Carrow Road; Attendance: 25,932; Referee: Tim Robinson

26 January 2019 29	Norwich City	2–2	Sheffield United	Norwich
15:00 GMT	Hernández 11'; Krul (yellow card) 45+4'; Pukki 56'; Trybull (yellow card) 77'; Zimmermann (yellow card) 86'	Report	Sharp 45+4' (pen.), 79'; Basham (yellow card) 81'; Duffy (yellow card) 86'	Stadium: Carrow Road; Attendance: 26,844; Referee: James Linnington

2 February 2019 30	Leeds United	1–3	Norwich City	Leeds
17:30 GMT	Roberts (yellow card) 52'; Roofe (yellow card) 64'; Alioski (yellow card) 74'; Bamford 90+1'	Report	Vrančić 5', 78'; Krul (yellow card) 26'; Pukki 35'; Stiepermann (yellow card) 83'	Stadium: Elland Road; Attendance: 36,524; Referee: Stuart Attwell

10 February 2019 31	Norwich City	3–0	Ipswich Town	Norwich
12:00 GMT	Hernández 2'; Lewis (yellow card) 60'; Pukki 65', 80'; Trybull (yellow card) 76'; Stiepermann (yellow card) 79'; Cantwell (yellow card) 90'	Report	Skuse (yellow card) 32'; Nolan (yellow card) 45+4'; Downes (yellow card) 90'	Stadium: Carrow Road; Attendance: 27,040; Referee: Peter Bankes

13 February 2019 32	Preston North End	3–1	Norwich City	Preston
19:45 GMT	Davies 2'; Gallagher 24' (pen.); Pearson (yellow card) 32'; Maguire 69'; Nmecha (yellow card) 71'; Rudd (yellow card) 90+4'	Report	Zimmermann (yellow card) 36'; Pukki 90+3'; Aarons (yellow card) 90+4'	Stadium: Deepdale; Attendance: 11,280; Referee: Geoff Eltringham

16 February 2019 33	Bolton Wanderers	0–4	Norwich City	Bolton
15:00 GMT	Noone (yellow card) 29'	Report	Pukki 8', 56'; Stiepermann 25'; Buendía 34'	Stadium: Macron Stadium; Attendance: 14,006; Referee: Andy Woolmer

23 February 2019 34	Norwich City	3–2	Bristol City	Norwich
15:00 GMT	McLean 36', 66'; Godfrey 55'; Trybull (yellow card) 70'	Report	Paterson 12'; O'Dowda 37'; Kalas (yellow card) 38'; Watkins (yellow card) 90+5'; Palmer (yellow card) 90+6'	Stadium: Carrow Road; Attendance: 26,338; Referee: Gavin Ward

2 March 2019 35	Millwall	1–3	Norwich City	Bermondsey
15:00 GMT	Meredith (yellow card) 32'; Thompson (yellow card) 39'; Williams 45'	Report	Stiepermann 16'; Zimmermann 69'; Pukki 79'	Stadium: The Den; Attendance: 16,478; Referee: David Webb

8 March 2019 36	Norwich City	1–0	Swansea City	Norwich
19:45 GMT	Buendía 54' (yellow card) 80'	Report	Carter-Vickers (yellow card) 90+2'	Stadium: Carrow Road; Attendance: 26,360; Referee: Robert Jones

13 March 2019 37	Norwich City	3–2	Hull City	Norwich
19:45 GMT	Stiepermann 11'; Buendía 14', 60'; Lewis (yellow card) 49'	Report	Kane (yellow card) 35'; Pugh 45'; Burke (yellow card) 59'; Henriksen (yellow card) 65'; Martin 87'	Stadium: Carrow Road; Attendance: 25,879; Referee: Andrew Madley

16 March 2019 38	Rotherham United	1–2	Norwich City	Rotherham
15:00 GMT	Ihiekwe (yellow card) 17'; Jones (yellow card) 29'; Ajayi 52'	Report	McLean 45'; Godfrey 57'; Stiepermann (yellow card) 64'; Aarons (yellow card) 88'	Stadium: New York Stadium; Attendance: 11,026; Referee: Oliver Langford

30 March 2019 39	Middlesbrough	0–1	Norwich City	Middlesbrough
17:30 GMT	Ayala (yellow card) 33'; Mikel (yellow card) 49'; Downing (yellow card) 66'	Report	Stiepermann (yellow card) 42'; Zimmermann (yellow card) 48'; Hernández 54' (yellow card) 54'; Trybull (yellow card) 57'	Stadium: Riverside Stadium; Attendance: 23,795; Referee: David Coote

6 April 2019 40	Norwich City	4–0	Queens Park Rangers	Norwich
12:30 BST	Buendía 6' (red card) 71'; Stiepermann 12'; Pukki 34', 85'	Report	Lynch (yellow card) 44'; Furlong (yellow card) 90+1'	Stadium: Carrow Road; Attendance: 26,796; Referee: Scott Duncan

10 April 2019 41	Norwich City	2–2	Reading	Norwich
19:45 BST	Godfrey 86'; Zimmermann 88'	Report	Méïté 30'; Martínez (yellow card) 48'; Baker (yellow card) 62'; Rinomhota 90+7'	Stadium: Carrow Road; Attendance: 26,662; Referee: Keith Stroud

14 April 2019 42	Wigan Athletic	1–1	Norwich City	Wigan
12:00 BST	Massey (yellow card) 32'; James 45' (pen.) (yellow card) 82'	Report	Trybull (yellow card) 44'; Zimmermann (yellow card) 68'; Pukki 81'	Stadium: DW Stadium; Attendance: 15,655; Referee: James Linington

19 April 2019 43	Norwich City	2–2	Sheffield Wednesday	Norwich
19:45 BST	Stiepermann 19'; Krul (yellow card) 54'; Vrančić 90+7'	Report	Dawson (yellow card) 9'; Forestieri 33'; Fletcher 53'; Boyd (yellow card) 81'	Stadium: Carrow Road; Attendance: 26,744; Referee: Geoff Eltringham

22 April 2019 44	Stoke City	2–2	Norwich City	Stoke-on-Trent
15:00 BST	Williams 47'; Edwards 69'	Report	Hernández 24'; Pukki 66'	Stadium: Bet365 Stadium; Attendance: 25,487; Referee: Tony Harrington

27 April 2019 45	Norwich City	2–1	Blackburn Rovers	Norwich
19:30 BST	Stiepermann 13'; Vrančić 21'; Zimmermann (yellow card) 64'	Report	Lenihan (yellow card) 18'; Travis 23'; Dack (yellow card) 53'; Armstrong (yellow card) 81'	Stadium: Carrow Road; Attendance: 26,848; Referee: Andrew Madley

5 May 2019 46	Aston Villa	1–2	Norwich City	Birmingham
15:00 BST	Kodjia 14'; Lansbury (yellow card) 62'	Report	Pukki 7'; Buendía (yellow card) 29'; Zimmermann (yellow card) 60'; Lewis (yellow card) 78'; Vrančić 86'	Stadium: Villa Park; Attendance: 41,696; Referee: Peter Bankes

=== FA Cup ===
The third round draw was made live on BBC by Ruud Gullit and Paul Ince from Stamford Bridge on 3 December 2018.

5 January 2019 Third round	Norwich City	0–1	Portsmouth	Norwich
17:30 GMT	Hanley (red card) 15'	Report	Lowe (yellow card) 55'; Curtis (yellow card) 71'; Green 90+4'	Stadium: Carrow Road; Attendance: 23,201; Referee: Darren Bond

=== EFL Cup ===
On 15 June 2018, the draw for the first round was made in Vietnam. The second round draw was made from the Stadium of Light on 16 August. The third round draw was made on 30 August 2018 by David Seaman and Joleon Lescott. The fourth round draw was made live on Quest by Rachel Yankey and Rachel Riley on 29 September.

14 August 2018 First round	Norwich City	3–1	Stevenage	Norwich
19:45 BST	Stiepermann 26'; Zimmermann (yellow card) 39' (goal) 82'; Passlack (yellow card) 58'; Pukki 89'	Report	Ball 39'; Guthrie (yellow card) 73'	Stadium: Carrow Road; Attendance: 11,687; Referee: Craig Hicks

28 August 2018 Second round	Cardiff City	1–3	Norwich City	Cardiff
19:45 BST	Richards (yellow card) 40'; Damour (yellow card) 73'; Ecuele Manga 77'	Report	Srbeny 26', 64'; Stiepermann (yellow card) 29'; Aarons 69' (yellow card) 79'	Stadium: Cardiff City Stadium; Attendance: 6,953; Referee: Andrew Madley

25 September 2018 Third round	Wycombe Wanderers	3–4	Norwich City	High Wycombe
19:45 BST	Saunders (yellow card) 15' (goal) 61' (pen.); Cowan-Hall 17'; Gape (yellow card) 45'; Mackail-Smith (yellow card) 45+3'; McCarthy 75'	Report	Rhodes 12', 14', 51'; Trybull 41'; Pinto (yellow card) 45'	Stadium: Adams Park; Attendance: 3,947; Referee: Jeremy Simpson

30 October 2018 Fourth round	Bournemouth	2–1	Norwich City	Bournemouth
19:45 BST	Stanislas 39'; Rico (yellow card) 47'; S. Cook 72'	Report	Zimmermann (yellow card) 49'; Hernández 70'	Stadium: Dean Court; Attendance: 10,331; Referee: Lee Mason

== Statistics ==
=== Appearances, goals and cards ===
No.	Pos	Player	Championship			FA Cup			EFL Cup			Total			Discipline	
No.	Pos	Player	Starts	Sub	Goals	Starts	Sub	Goals	Starts	Sub	Goals	Starts	Sub	Goals	Booked	Sent off (straight red)
1	GK	(Netherlands) Tim Krul	46	0	0	—	—	—	—	—	—	46	0	0	4	0
2	DF	(Portugal) Ivo Pinto	3	0	0	—	—	—	2	0	0	5	0	0	1	0
4	MF	(England) Ben Godfrey	26	5	4	1	0	0	4	0	0	31	5	4	3	0
6	DF	(Germany) Christoph Zimmermann	39	1	2	1	0	0	4	0	1	44	1	3	13	0
8	MF	(Bosnia and Herzegovina) Mario Vrančić	14	22	10	—	—	—	2	0	0	16	22	10	5	0
10	MF	(Germany) Moritz Leitner	19	10	2	—	—	—	1	1	0	20	11	2	5	0
11	ST	(Scotland) Jordan Rhodes	9	27	6	1	0	0	1	2	3	11	29	9	2	0
12	DF	(Northern Ireland) Jamal Lewis	42	0	0	—	—	—	1	1	0	43	1	0	6	0
15	DF	(Switzerland) Timm Klose	23	8	4	0	1	0	0	1	0	23	10	4	2	0
17	MF	(Argentina) Emiliano Buendía	34	3	8	—	—	—	2	1	0	36	4	8	6	1
18	MF	(Germany) Marco Stiepermann	39	4	9	—	—	—	2	1	1	41	5	10	7	0
19	MF	(Germany) Tom Trybull	22	9	1	1	0	0	4	0	1	27	9	2	8	0
22	ST	(Finland) Teemu Pukki	43	0	29	0	1	0	0	2	1	43	3	30	2	0
23	MF	(Scotland) Kenny McLean	15	5	3	1	0	0	0	1	0	16	6	3	1	0
24	DF	(Germany) Felix Passlack	0	1	0	1	0	0	4	0	0	5	1	0	1	0
25	MF	(Germany) Onel Hernández	35	5	8	0	1	0	1	1	1	36	7	9	3	0
27	MF	(Norway) Alexander Tettey	26	4	1	—	—	—	2	0	0	28	4	1	4	0
28	DF	(Germany) Philip Heise	—	—	—	—	—	—	—	—	—	0	0	0	0	0
30	ST	(England) Carlton Morris	—	—	—	—	—	—	—	—	—	0	0	0	0	0
31	DF	(Scotland) Grant Hanley	6	3	1	1	0	0	—	—	—	7	3	1	0	1
32	FW	(Germany) Dennis Srbeny	0	15	1	1	0	0	4	0	2	5	15	3	0	0
33	GK	(Northern Ireland) Michael McGovern	—	—	—	1	0	0	4	0	0	5	0	0	0	0
34	MF	(Wales) Louis Thompson	1	5	0	—	—	—	2	0	0	3	5	0	0	0
36	MF	(England) Todd Cantwell	18	6	1	1	0	0	2	0	0	21	6	1	3	0
37	DF	(England) Max Aarons	41	0	2	—	—	—	2	0	1	43	0	3	9	0
38	GK	(England) Aston Oxborough	—	—	—	—	—	—	—	—	—	0	0	0	0	0
40	MF	(England) Alfie Payne	—	—	—	—	—	—	—	—	—	0	0	0	0	0
Players out on loan:
3	DF	(England) James Husband	1	0	0	—	—	—	—	—	—	1	0	0	0	0
7	MF	(England) Ben Marshall	4	0	0	1	0	0	0	1	0	5	1	0	1	0
9	ST	(Portugal) Nélson Oliveira	—	—	—	—	—	—	—	—	—	0	0	0	0	0
16	MF	(England) Matt Jarvis	—	—	—	—	—	—	—	—	—	0	0	0	0	0
41	DF	(England) Oluwarotimi Odusina	—	—	—	—	—	—	—	—	—	0	0	0	0	0
—	DF	(Germany) Marcel Franke	—	—	—	—	—	—	—	—	—	0	0	0	0	0
—	DF	(England) Sean Raggett	—	—	—	—	—	—	—	—	—	0	0	0	0	0
—	MF	(Scotland) Steven Naismith	—	—	—	—	—	—	—	—	—	0	0	0	0	0
—	MF	(Netherlands) Yanic Wildschut	—	—	—	—	—	—	—	—	—	0	0	0	0	0
Players no longer at the club:
5	DF	(Scotland) Russell Martin	—	—	—	—	—	—	—	—	—	0	0	0	0	0
29	GK	(England) Remi Matthews	—	—	—	—	—	—	—	—	—	0	0	0	0	0

=== Goalscorers ===
Rank	Pos.	Player	Championship	FA Cup	EFL Cup	Total
1	ST	Teemu Pukki	29	0	1	30
2	MF	Mario Vrančić	10	0	0	10
2	MF	Marco Stiepermann	9	0	1	10
4	MF	Onel Hernández	8	0	1	9
4	ST	Jordan Rhodes	6	0	3	9
6	MF	Emiliano Buendía	8	0	0	8
7	DF	Timm Klose	4	0	0	4
7	MF	Ben Godfrey	4	0	0	4
9	MF	Kenny McLean	3	0	0	3
9	DF	Max Aarons	2	0	1	3
9	DF	Christoph Zimmermann	2	0	1	3
9	ST	Dennis Srbeny	1	0	2	3
13	MF	Moritz Leitner	2	0	0	2
13	MF	Tom Trybull	1	0	1	2
15	DF	Grant Hanley	1	0	0	1
15	MF	Alexander Tettey	1	0	0	1
15	MF	Todd Cantwell	1	0	0	1
Own goals			1	0	0	1
Totals			93	0	11	104
