= Timm Klose =

Swiss footballer (born 1988)

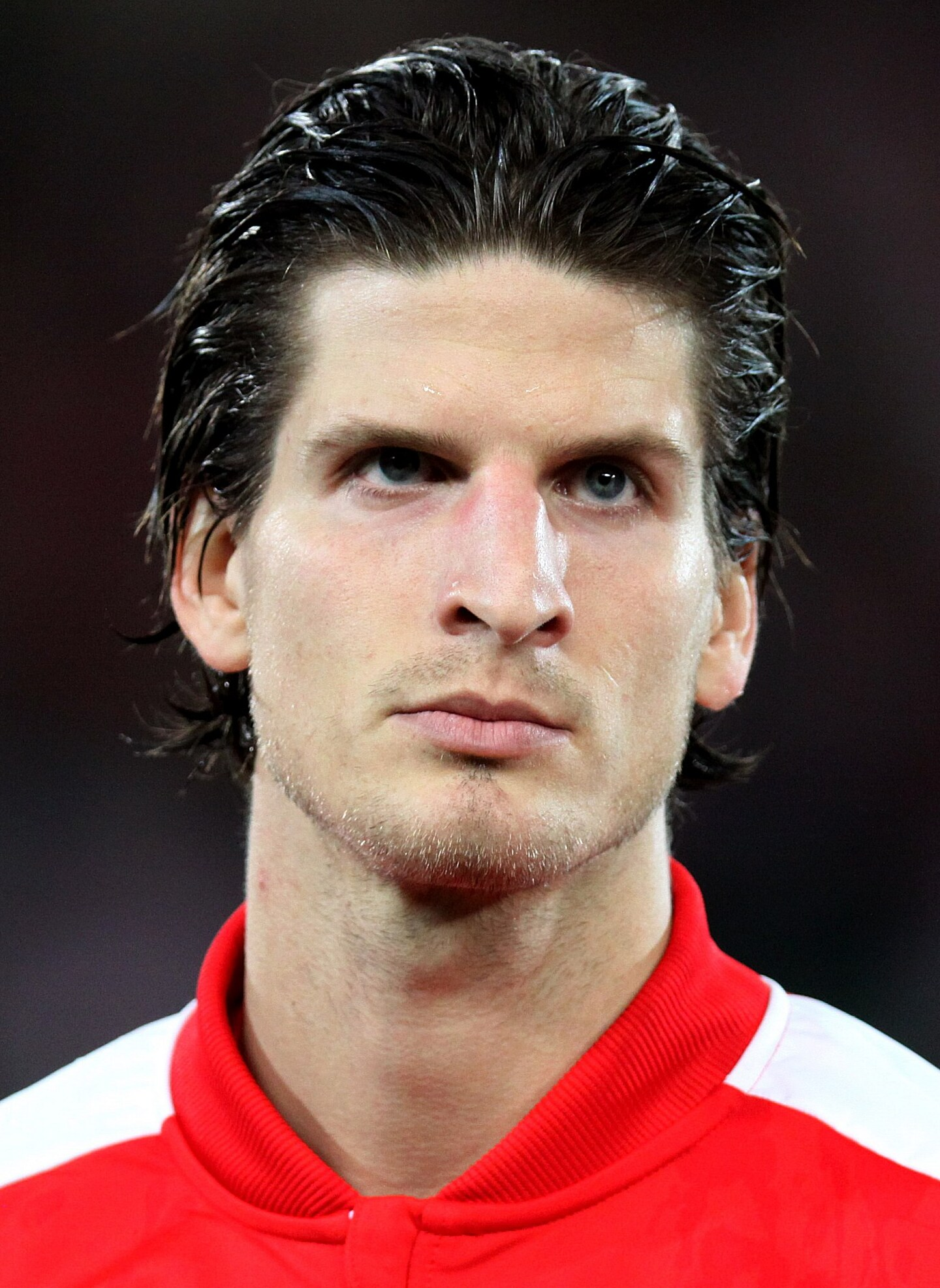
- Klose playing for Switzerland in 2015

Personal information
- Full name: Timm Klose
- Date of birth: 9 May 1988 (age 38)
- Place of birth: Frankfurt, West Germany
- Position: Centre-back

Team information
- Current team: Basel U21
- Number: 15

Youth career
- 1993–2003: BSC Old Boys
- 2003–2004: FC Basel
- 2004–2007: BSC Old Boys

Senior career*
Years	Team	Apps	(Gls)
2007–2009	Basel U21	47	(3)
2009–2011	FC Thun	59	(4)
2011–2013	1. FC Nürnberg	45	(2)
2012	→ 1. FC Nürnberg II	8	(1)
2013–2016	VfL Wolfsburg	30	(2)
2016–2021	Norwich City	117	(10)
2020–2021	→ Basel (loan)	28	(2)
2022–2023	Bristol City	16	(1)
2023–2024	Basel U21	37	(1)

International career^{‡}
2010–2011	Switzerland U21	11	(0)
2011–2018	Switzerland	17	(0)
2012	Switzerland Olympic	4	(0)
- * Club domestic league appearances and goals as of 6 November 2024 ‡ National team caps and goals as of 28 March 2020

Timm Klose (born 9 May 1988) is a Swiss former professional footballer who played as a centre-back.

Born in Frankfurt to a German father and Swiss mother, he was raised in Switzerland from the age of five. After playing in the youth teams of BSC Old Boys and FC Basel, he moved to FC Thun in 2009, and two years later joined German club 1. FC Nürnberg. He played for VfL Wolfsburg from 2013 until he joined Norwich City in 2016, where he made over 100 appearances. In 2022, Klose signed for EFL Championship side Bristol City. After departing the club, he retired from playing and began coaching Basel's under-21 side.

Klose made his full international debut for Switzerland in 2011 and was capped 17 times. He also played for the Switzerland Olympic team at London 2012.

== Club career ==
=== Youth football ===
Klose started his youth football with local amateur club BSC Old Boys in 1993. In the summer of 2003, he moved to FC Basel youth, but returned after one year. He advanced to the OB first team, who played in the fourth tier of the Swiss football league system, for the 2006–07 season and in that season the team became division champions and won promotion. In the summer 2007 he again moved to FCB and joined their U-21 team, also third tier, under coach Patrick Rahmen. The team became division (group2) winners in the 2007–08 season, and became Swiss champions at U-21 level. A year later, in the 2008–09 season, they became division (group2) winners and Swiss champions at the U-21 level again. During his two seasons with the team he played 47 games and scored three goals. Klose had played in four test games for Basel's first team and wanted to advance to them for their 2009–10 season, but Basel's new head coach was Thorsten Fink and he wanted Klose to wait another year. Klose decided to move on.

=== FC Thun ===
Murat Yakin was appointed as new head coach of FC Thun in summer 2009 and one of his first actions was to acquire the services of Basel's U-21 team captain Nicolas Schindelholz and their central defender Klose, both of whom failed to advance to first team. The team played in the second tier and Klose achieved 29 league and three cup appearances during the 2009–10 Challenge League season. They were division champions and won promotion. Klose scored one goal during the 4–0 home win over FC Gossau on 5 December. In his second season with the club, Thun managed to finish 5th in the 2010–11 Super League season and thus earned the Qualification to 2011–12 Europa League second qualifying round. He made 30 league appearances that season, scoring three times.

=== 1. FC Nürnberg ===
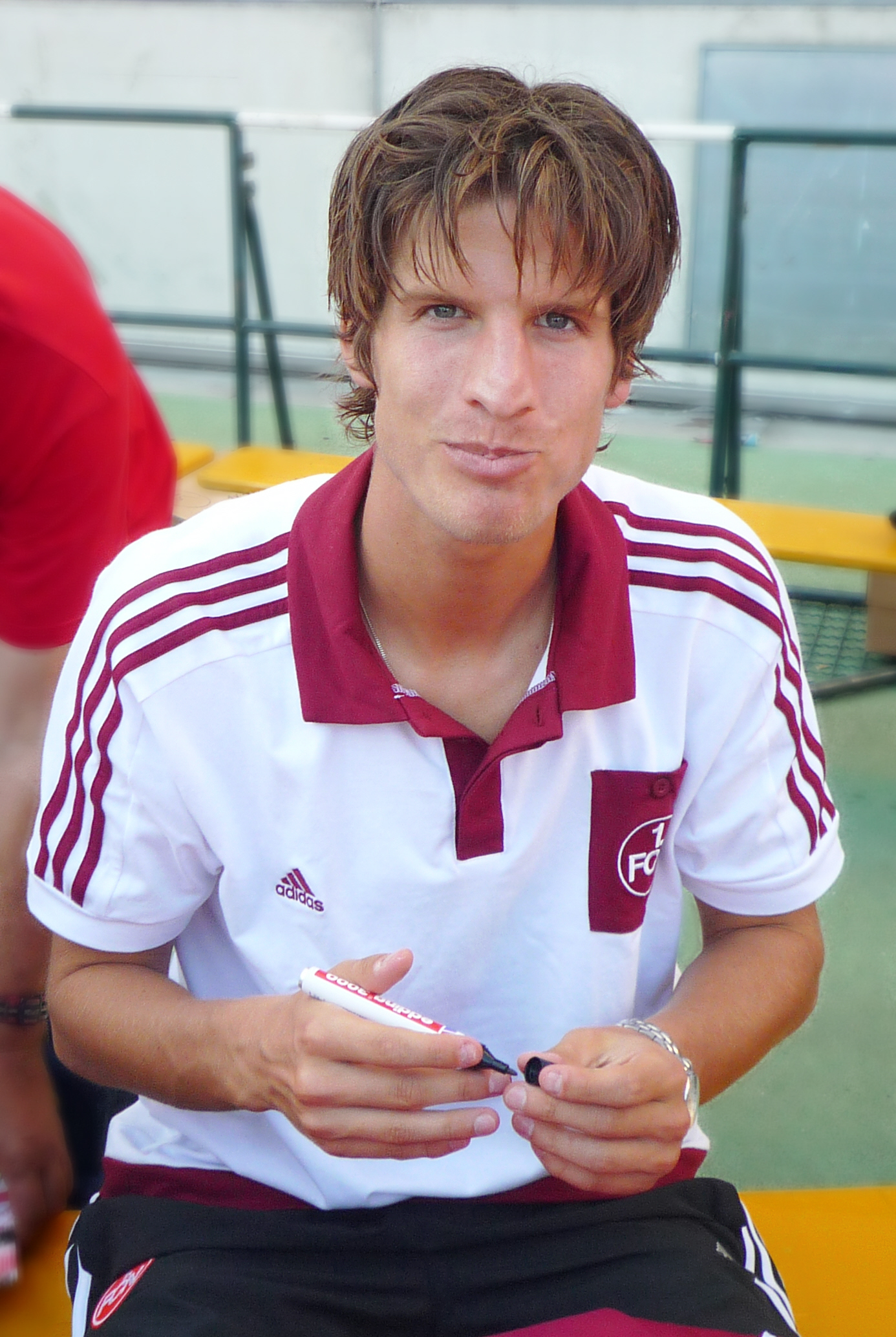
Klose with Nürnberg in 2011

On 28 May 2011, Klose left Thun for 1. FC Nürnberg on a three-year deal for around €400,000. He made 13 league appearances from August to November, and then 8 from March to May with the reserves in the Regionalliga Bayern; he scored the only goal on 8 May against FC Ingolstadt 04 II. The following season he returned to the first team and scored twice in 32 Bundesliga appearances.

=== VfL Wolfsburg ===
On 1 July 2013, Klose signed for VfL Wolfsburg on a four-year contract. He was sent off on his Wolfsburg debut, a 2–0 away defeat to rivals Hannover 96 on 10 August, and only played 9 more league games throughout the season, with just 4 more as a starter. However, he played the full 90 minutes as Wolfsburg won the DFB-Pokal for the first time with a 3–1 victory over Borussia Dortmund on 30 May 2015.

=== Norwich City ===
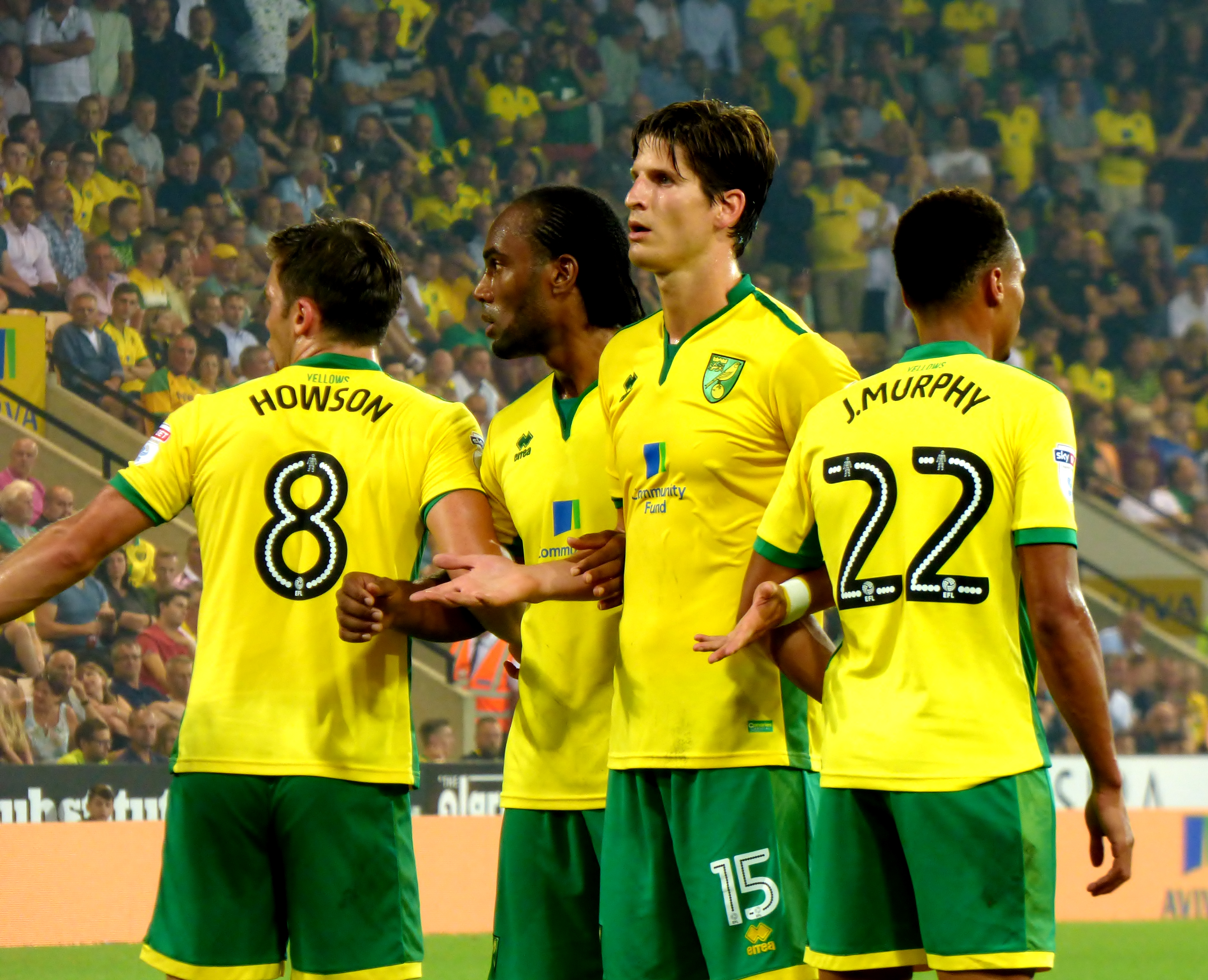
Left to right: Jonny Howson, Cameron Jerome, Klose and Jacob Murphy make a defensive wall against Wigan Athletic in September 2016

On 18 January 2016, Klose signed for Premier League side Norwich City on a three-and-a-half-year contract for an undisclosed fee. He made his debut on 2 February in a 3–0 home loss to Tottenham Hotspur, and totalled ten games for the relegated Canaries, scoring to open a 3–2 win over Newcastle United at Carrow Road on 2 April.

In 2018–19, Klose played 31 times as Norwich won the EFL Championship and scored four goals, including both of a 2–1 win at Nottingham Forest on 20 October 2018. He signed a new three-year contract on 20 May 2019, tying him to the club until 2022.

Klose suffered a posterior cruciate ligament injury to his right knee on 27 August 2019, as Norwich were eliminated from the EFL Cup by Crawley Town. He did not return until the following 19 June, when he played a 3–0 home loss to Southampton following the COVID-19 hiatus. Eight days later, he was sent off for the first time for Norwich, when he pulled down Odion Ighalo in a 2–1 home extra-time loss to Manchester United in the sixth round of the FA Cup.

=== Basel ===
On 7 October 2020, FC Basel announced that they had reached an agreement with Norwich and that Klose had signed in on a loan contract until the end of the season. After playing in two test games Klose played his domestic league debut for his new club in the away game in the Stadion Wankdorf in Bern on 21 November 2020 as Basel were defeated 1–2 by Swiss reigning champions Young Boys. He scored his first goal for his club in the home game in the St. Jakob-Park on 9 December 2020. It was the first goal of the game and Basel went on to win 4–2 against Sion.

Basel played one of their worst seasons in this campaign and the 2020–21 Swiss Cup match in their own St. Jakob-Park against lower tier Winterthur on 17 February 2021 resulted in a debacle. The outsiders went into an early lead and added a second just before half time. Directly after the break FCW played as they wished with the FCB defence and added three more goals within 10 minutes. The end score was 6–2. This is the highest number of goals that the team has conceded in their home stadium since it was opened on 15 March 2001. Klose played the entire match and he and the entire back four received a lot of criticism after the match.

The return to Klose's club of origin was sportingly not a lucky one. Klose could not bring the sporting performance that had been expected. On 22 May 2021 the club announced that Klose's contract that would expire 30 June 2021 would not be renewed and that he would return to Norwich. In his one season with the club Klose played a total of 37 games for Basel scoring a total of two goals. 28 of these games were in the Swiss Super League, one in the Swiss Cup and eight were friendly games. He scored both his goals in the domestic league.

=== Bristol City ===
Klose signed for Championship club Bristol City on 27 January 2022, joining as a free transfer. He played his first game for the club in the EFL Championship which was against Preston North End which ended in 2–2 draw on 29 January 2022. In June 2022 he signed a new one-year contract at Ashton Gate with a further one year option. In January 2023, Klose left Bristol City by mutual agreement. During his period with the team he made 30 appearances and scored one goal.

Sometime later, Klose described that his wish for the termination of his contract with City actually came at a strange time. Not in the autumn, as he suffered severe blows of fate in his private life, but during the Christmas period. "Sad events in the immediate vicinity occurred, that cost a lot of personal energy. The family moved into the foreground. Football became a minor matter during this time," he explained. In addition to a death and a serious heart operation in his close family, the cancer drama surrounding his former youth and Thun teammate and good family friend Nicolas Schindelholz († 34) also hit Klose hard. Klose's family went through an extreme roller coaster of emotions: "But the club showed enormous understanding for my situation." City also allowed him to travel repeatedly to Switzerland and he missed several games.

=== FCB U-21 ===
After departing Bristol City, Klose retired from playing and began assisting coaching Basel's under-21 side. Despite rumours about him ending his active career, Klose signed a one-year contract with Basel with the FCB U21 team. The club announced, that if he brought in his qualities, both on and beside the pitch to the team, then the young players could learn from him just by observing. He would also be a link between the coaching staff and the players, who can convey our ideas to the team in a different way.

== International career ==
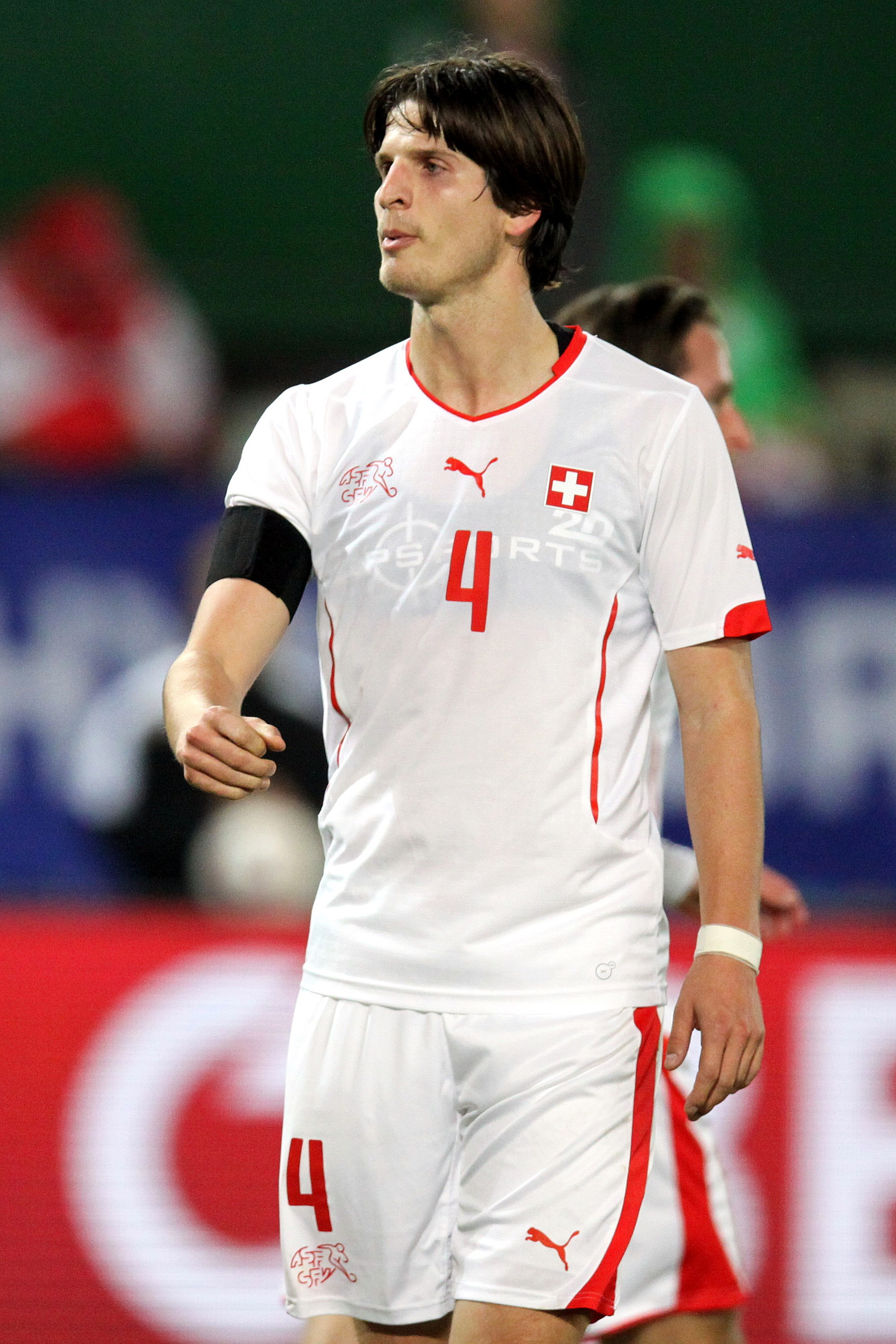
Klose with Switzerland in 2015

Klose was named in the Team of the Tournament at the 2011 UEFA European Under-21 Championship in which his country reached the final. He also represented Switzerland at the 2012 Olympics, and played every match as Switzerland were eliminated in last place in Group B.

He made his full international debut for Switzerland on 10 August 2011, replacing Philippe Senderos in the 57th minute of a 2–1 away friendly win against Liechtenstein. On 7 October he played his first competitive international and start, as Switzerland lost a Euro 2012 qualifier 2–0 away to Wales. He also played two matches in the team's successful 2014 FIFA World Cup qualification, but was not selected for the tournament.

An injury sustained by Klose while playing for Norwich City in April 2016, ultimately led to him missing selection for Euro 2016.

Klose's last international appearance was on 18 November 2018 as Switzerland won 5–2 against Belgium in the 2018–19 UEFA Nations League A.

== Career statistics ==
As of match played 23 April 2022

Appearances and goals by club, season and competition
Club	Season	League			National cup		League cup		Continental		Other		Total	
Club	Season	League	Apps	Goals	Apps	Goals	Apps	Goals	Apps	Goals	Apps	Goals	Apps	Goals
Thun	2009–10	Swiss Challenge League	29	2	0	0	—		—		—		29	2
Thun	2010–11	Swiss Super League	30	3	1	1	—		—		—		31	4
Thun	Total		59	5	1	1	—		—		—		60	6
1. FC Nürnberg II	2011–12	Regionalliga Süd	8	1	—		—		—		—		8	1
1. FC Nürnberg	2011–12	Bundesliga	13	0	1	0	—		—		—		14	0
1. FC Nürnberg	2012–13	Bundesliga	32	2	1	0	—		—		—		33	2
1. FC Nürnberg	Total		45	2	2	0	—		—		—		47	2
VfL Wolfsburg	2013–14	Bundesliga	10	0	2	1	—		—		—		12	1
VfL Wolfsburg	2014–15	Bundesliga	12	1	4	1	—		3 (Note: Appearances in UEFA Europa League)	1	—		19	3
VfL Wolfsburg	2015–16	Bundesliga	8	1	1	0	—		2 (Note: Appearances in UEFA Champions League)	0	1 (Note: Appearance in DFL-Supercup)	0	12	1
VfL Wolfsburg	Total		30	2	7	2	—		5	1	1	0	43	5
Norwich City	2015–16	Premier League	10	1	0	0	0	0	—		—		10	1
Norwich City	2016–17	Championship	32	1	2	0	0	0	—		1	0	35	1
Norwich City	2017–18	Championship	37	4	1	0	0	0	—		—		38	4
Norwich City	2018–19	Championship	31	4	1	0	1	0	—		—		33	4
Norwich City	2019–20	Premier League	7	0	1	0	1	0	—		—		9	0
Norwich City	2020–21	Championship	0	0	0	0	1	0	—		—		1	0
Norwich City	Total		117	10	5	0	3	0	0	0	1	0	126	10
FC Basel (loan)	2020–21	Swiss Super League	28	2	1	0	—		0	0	—		29	2
Bristol City	2021–22	Championship	16	1	—		—		—		—		16	1
Career total			303	23	16	3	3	0	5	1	2	0	329	27

== Honours ==
Basel

- Swiss champion at U-21 level: 2007–08, 2008–09

FC Thun

- Swiss Challenge League: 2009–10

VfL Wolfsburg

- DFB-Pokal: 2014–15
- DFL-Supercup: 2015

Norwich City

- EFL Championship: 2018–19

Switzerland U21

- UEFA European Under-21 Championship runner-up:2011

Individual

- UEFA European Under-21 Championship Team of the Tournament: 2011

== Sources ==
- Josef Zindel (2018). FC Basel 1893. Die ersten 125 Jahre (in German). Basel: Friedrich Reinhardt Verlag. ISBN 978-3-7245-2305-5.
