= Christoph Zimmermann =

German footballer (born 1993)

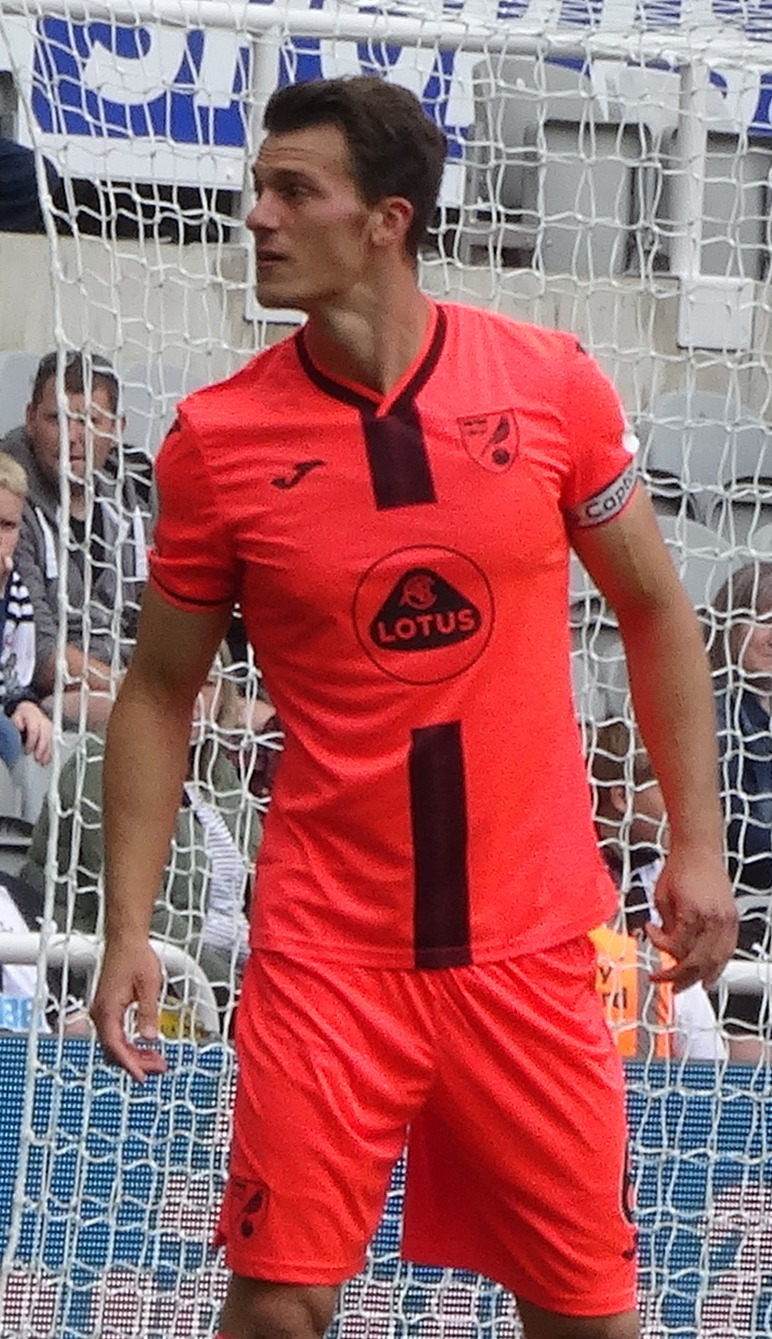
- Zimmermann playing for Norwich City in 2021

Personal information
- Full name: Christoph Zimmermann
- Date of birth: 12 January 1993 (age 33)
- Place of birth: Düsseldorf, Germany
- Height: 1.94 m (6 ft 4 in)
- Position: Centre-back

Youth career
- SC Düsseldorf-West
- 2006–2012: Borussia Mönchengladbach

Senior career*
Years	Team	Apps	(Gls)
2012–2014	Borussia Mönchengladbach II	52	(3)
2014–2017	Borussia Dortmund II	85	(2)
2017–2022	Norwich City	121	(3)
2022–2025	Darmstadt 98	51	(0)
Total		309	(8)
- * Club domestic league appearances and goals

Christoph Zimmermann (born 12 January 1993) is a German former professional footballer who played as a centre-back.

== Career ==
=== Early career ===
Zimmermann joined Borussia Dortmund II in 2014 from Borussia Mönchengladbach. He made his professional debut in the 3. Liga on 26 July 2014 against Rot-Weiß Erfurt.

=== Norwich City ===
On 15 June 2017, Zimmerman agreed to join English club Norwich City on a two-year deal when his contract expired at Borussia Dortmund II on 1 July 2017. Zimmermann made his debut for Norwich City in a 1–1 draw against Fulham on 5 August 2017. He scored his first goal for Norwich in a 2–2 draw at Wolverhampton Wanderers on 21 February 2018. He lifted the Championship title on 5 May 2019 at Villa Park after a 2–1 win for Norwich sealed their return to the Premier League.

Zimmermann made his Premier League debut for Norwich against West Ham United on 31 August 2019 in a 2–0 loss.

=== Darmstadt ===
On 20 July 2022, Zimmermann signed a three-year contract with German second-tier club Darmstadt 98 in an undisclosed transfer.

=== Retirement ===
On 25 November 2025, Zimmermann announced his retirement from football, aged 32.

== Career statistics ==
Appearances and goals by club, season and competition
Club	Season	League			National cup		League cup		Other		Total	
Club	Season	Division	Apps	Goals	Apps	Goals	Apps	Goals	Apps	Goals	Apps	Goals
Borussia Mönchengladbach II	2011–12	Regionalliga West	5	0	—		—		—		5	0
Borussia Mönchengladbach II	2012–13	Regionalliga West	19	2	—		—		—		19	2
Borussia Mönchengladbach II	2013–14	Regionalliga West	28	1	—		—		—		28	1
Borussia Mönchengladbach II	Total		52	3	—		—		—		52	3
Borussia Dortmund II	2014–15	3. Liga	27	0	—		—		—		27	0
Borussia Dortmund II	2015–16	Regionalliga West	29	2	—		—		—		29	2
Borussia Dortmund II	2016–17	Regionalliga West	29	0	—		—		—		29	0
Borussia Dortmund II	Total		85	2	—		—		—		85	2
Norwich City	2017–18	Championship	39	1	2	0	4	0	—		45	1
Norwich City	2018–19	Championship	40	2	1	0	4	1	—		45	3
Norwich City	2019–20	Premier League	17	0	2	0	1	0	—		20	0
Norwich City	2020–21	Championship	22	0	1	0	1	0	—		24	0
Norwich City	2021–22	Premier League	3	0	1	0	1	0	—		5	0
Norwich City	Total		121	3	7	0	11	1	0	0	139	4
Darmstadt 98	2022–23	2. Bundesliga	31	0	2	0	—		—		33	0
Darmstadt 98	2023–24	Bundesliga	19	0	1	0	—		—		20	0
Darmstadt 98	2024–25	2. Bundesliga	1	0	1	0	—		—		2	0
Darmstadt 98	Total		51	0	1	0	—		—		2	0
Career total			309	8	11	0	11	1	0	0	331	9

== Honours ==
Norwich City

- EFL Championship: 2018–19, 2020–21

Darmstadt 98

- 2. Bundesliga runner-up: 2022–23
