= Mason Bloomfield =

English footballer (born 1996)

Personal information
- Full name: Mason Ozail Enigbokan-Bloomfield
- Date of birth: 6 November 1996 (age 30)
- Place of birth: Westminster, England
- Height: 6 ft 3 in (1.91 m)
- Position: Forward

Team information
- Current team: Farnborough
- Number: 26

Youth career
- –2014: Dagenham & Redbridge

Senior career*
Years	Team	Apps	(Gls)
2014–2015	Dagenham & Redbridge	1	(0)
2014	→ Chatham Town (loan)	5	(1)
2014	→ Erith & Belvedere (loan)	1	(1)
2014–2015	→ Maldon & Tiptree (loan)	18	(5)
2015	Chelmsford City	1	(0)
2015	→ Billericay Town (dual registration)	3	(0)
2015–2016	Grays Athletic	7	(0)
2016	Witham Town	8	(0)
2016	Brentwood Town	6	(1)
2016–2017	Aveley	13	(6)
2017–2018	Dagenham & Redbridge	26	(3)
2017	→ Aveley (loan)	7	(3)
2018–2020	Norwich City	0	(0)
2018–2019	→ Hamilton Academical (loan)	5	(1)
2019	→ AFC Fylde (loan)	1	(0)
2019–2020	→ Crawley Town (loan)	21	(3)
2020–2021	Hartlepool United	22	(2)
2021–2022	Barnet	20	(3)
2022–2023	Bromley	13	(2)
2023	Farnborough	21	(11)
2023–2024	Hampton & Richmond Borough	39	(10)
2024	Farnborough	8	(1)
2025–	Farnborough	46	(13)
- * Club domestic league appearances and goals as of 21:59, 22 October 2026 (UTC)

Mason Ozail Enigbokan-Bloomfield (born 6 November 1996) is an English professional footballer who plays as a forward for Farnborough.

== Career ==
=== Dagenham & Redbridge ===
Bloomfield was born in Westminster but raised in Edgware, and is of Jamaican descent. He played for the Ase Academy based in Edmonton before joining the youth system at Dagenham & Redbridge. In the summer of 2013, he started a two-year scholarship with the club. Whilst still in the youth team, he made his professional debut for the first team in a 2–0 defeat to Northampton Town in September 2014, replacing Matt Partridge as a last-minute substitute despite featuring in a youth team match the same morning. Later in the month he joined Isthmian League Division One North side Chatham Town on loan, making his debut in a 2–0 defeat to Romford. He scored his first goal for the club in a 2–1 victory over Harlow Town. He made his final appearance for the club in a 1–1 draw with Thamesmead Town, having made five appearances scoring once. In October 2014, he was sent out on loan to Southern Counties East Football League side Erith & Belvedere, scoring on his debut with a header in the 3–1 away win over Tunbridge Wells. He only went on to make two more appearances for the club before returning to Dagenham in November. In December 2014 he was moved out on loan again to Maldon & Tiptree of the Isthmian League Division One North.

=== Non-league ===
On 28 August 2015, Chelmsford City signed Bloomfield alongside Laurence Vaughan. Mason became dual-registered with Billericay Town during September 2015. In October 2015, Grays Athletic signed Bloomfield from Chelmsford City.

After spells at Witham Town and Brentwood Town in 2016, Bloomfield joined Aveley in December. He scored on his debut for Aveley on 10 December in the 1–0 away win at Soham Town Rangers.

=== Return to Dagenham & Redbridge ===
In March 2017, Bloomfield rejoined Dagenham & Redbridge from Aveley.

=== Norwich City ===
On 23 March 2018, it was announced that Bloomfield would join Norwich City in the summer of 2018. On 24 June 2018 he joined Scottish side Hamilton Academical on loan from Norwich. He was recalled by Norwich in January 2019. Bloomfield joined AFC Fylde on loan for the remainder of the season on 4 January 2019. He made his debut for the club the following day as a substitute with Fylde trailing 2–1 to Bromley; Bloomfield provided the assist for a Fylde equaliser before being substituted for a compound fracture in his forearm, with Fylde eventually losing 3–2. Bloomfield failed to play again that season.

On 31 May 2019, Bloomfield joined Crawley Town on loan for the 2019–20 season. He made 24 appearances for Crawley across the 2019–20 season and scored 4 goals. He was released by Norwich at the end of the season.

=== Hartlepool United ===
Bloomfield signed permanently for Hartlepool United on 5 August 2020. Bloomfield scored his first Hartlepool goal in a 6–0 FA Cup victory at Ilkeston Town. Bloomfield was released by Hartlepool at the end of the season.

=== Barnet ===
On 1 July 2021, Bloomfield signed for Barnet. He scored three goals in 21 appearances for the Bees.

=== Bromley ===
In February 2022, Bloomfield joined Bromley for an undisclosed fee.

=== Farnborough ===
On 1 January 2023, Bloomfield signed for National League South club Farnborough, scoring the winner the same day on his debut in a 2–1 win over Hungerford Town.

=== Hampton & Richmond Borough ===
On 19 May 2023, it was confirmed that Bloomfield would join fellow National League South side, Hampton & Richmond Borough, following the expiry of his contract with Farnborough.

=== Return to Farnborough ===
On 7 June 2024, Bloomfield returned to Farnborough ahead of the 2024–25 campaign, after a season away from Cherrywood Road.

On 3 October 2024, it was announced that Bloomfield had left the club due to personal reasons.

In June 2025, Bloomfield returned to Farnborough.

== Career statistics ==
As of 17 October 2026

Appearances and goals by club, season and competition
Club	Season	League			FA Cup		League Cup		Other		Total	
Club	Season	Division	Apps	Goals	Apps	Goals	Apps	Goals	Apps	Goals	Apps	Goals
Dagenham & Redbridge	2014–15	League Two	1	0	0	0	0	0	0	0	1	0
Chatham Town (loan)	2014–15	IL Division One North	5	1	—		—		—		5	1
Erith & Belvedere (loan)	2014–15	Southern Counties East League	1	1	—		—		—		1	1
Maldon & Tiptree (loan)	2014–15	IL Division One North	18	5	—		—		—		18	5
Chelmsford City	2015–16	National League South	1	0	—		—		—		1	0
Billericay Town	2015–16	IL Premier Division	3	0	—		—		—		3	0
Grays Athletic	2015–16	IL Premier Division	7	0	—		—		2 (Note: Appearances in FA Trophy)	0	9	0
Witham Town	2015–16	IL Division One North	8	0	—		—		—		8	0
Brentwood Town	2016–17	IL Division One North	6	1	—		—		—		6	1
Aveley	2016–17	IL Division One North	20	9	—		—		—		20	9
Dagenham & Redbridge	2016–17	National League	0	0	—		—		0	0	0	0
Dagenham & Redbridge	2017–18	National League	26	3	2	0	—		1	0	28	3
Dagenham & Redbridge	Total		26	3	2	0	0	0	1	0	29	3
Norwich City	2018–19	Championship	0	0	0	0	0	0	—		0	0
Norwich City	2019–20	Premier League	0	0	0	0	0	0	0	0	0	0
Norwich City	Total		0	0	0	0	0	0	0	0	0	0
Hamilton Academical (loan)	2018–19	Scottish Premiership	5	1	—		2	0	—		7	1
Hamilton Academical U21	2018–19	—			—		—		2 (Note: Appearances in Scottish Challenge Cup)	2	2	2
AFC Fylde (loan)	2018–19	National League	1	0	—		—		0	0	1	0
Crawley Town (loan)	2019–20	League Two	21	3	0	0	1	0	2 (Note: Appearance(s) in EFL Trophy)	1	24	4
Hartlepool United	2020–21	National League	22	2	2	1	0	0	0	0	24	3
Barnet	2021–22	National League	20	3	1	0	0	0	0	0	21	3
Bromley	2021–22	National League	7	2	0	0	0	0	3	0	10	2
Bromley	2022–23	National League	6	0	0	0	0	0	1	0	7	0
Bromley	Total		13	2	0	0	0	0	4	0	17	2
Farnborough	2022–23	National League South	21	11	0	0	0	0	0	0	21	11
Hampton & Richmond Borough	2023–24	National League South	39	10	1	0	0	0	1	0	41	10
Farnborough	2024–25	National League South	8	1	1	0	0	0	0	0	9	1
Farnborough	2025–26	National League South	37	12	3	0	0	0	1	0	41	12
Farnborough	2026–27	National League South	9	1	2	1	0	0	0	0	11	2
Farnborough	Total		54	14	6	1	0	0	1	0	61	15
Career total			262	66	12	2	3	0	13	3	320	71

== Honours ==
Bromley

- FA Trophy: 2021–22
