= Savvas Mourgos =

Greek footballer

Personal information
- Full name: Savvas Mourgos
- Date of birth: 16 March 1998 (age 28)
- Place of birth: Marousi, Athens, Greece
- Height: 1.75 m (5 ft 9 in)
- Position: Right winger

Team information
- Current team: Panionios
- Number: 23

Youth career
- 2004–2010: Panionios
- 2010–2014: Arsenal Elite Academy
- 2014–2017: Arsenal
- 2017–2018: Norwich City

Senior career*
Years	Team	Apps	(Gls)
2018–2020	Norwich City	0	(0)
2018	→ Dordrecht (loan)	10	(3)
2019–2020	→ Dordrecht (loan)	5	(0)
2020–2022	Veria	33	(8)
2022–2024	Panserraikos	48	(4)
2024–2026	AEL	49	(5)
2026–	Panionios	1	(0)

International career
- Greece U17
- * Club domestic league appearances and goals as of 14 September 2026

Savvas Mourgos (Greek: Σάββας Μούργος; born 16 March 1998) is a Greek professional footballer who plays as a right winger for Super League 2 club Panionios.

== Club career ==
Born in Marousi, Mourgos began his career with Panionios at the age of six, moving to the Arsenal Elite Academy in 2010 before signing for English club Arsenal in 2014. He moved to Norwich City in August 2017. He moved on loan to Dutch club Dordrecht in July 2018.

He was released by Norwich at the end of the 2019–20 season.

He signed for Veria in October 2020 on a two-year contract. He then moved to Panserraikos.

In July 2024 he signed for AEL.

On 8 June 2026, Mourgos signed for Panionios on a free transfer, after a two-year stint with AEL.

== International career ==
Mourgos has represented Greece at under-17 youth level.
