= 2020–21 FC Sochaux-Montbéliard season =

Sochaux
2020–21 season
- Chairmen: Samuel Laurent; Frankie Yau
- Manager: Omar Daf
- Stadium: Stade Auguste Bonal
- Ligue 2: 7th
- Coupe de France: Round of 32
- Top goalscorer: League: Chris Bedia; Bryan Lasme (9 each); All: Chris Bedia (12 goals)
Home colours	Away colours

The 2020–21 FC Sochaux-Montbéliard season was the club's 93rd season in existence and its seventh consecutive season in the second division of French football. In addition to the domestic league, Sochaux participated in this season's edition of the Coupe de France. The season covered the period from 1 July 2020 to 30 June 2021.

== Players ==
=== First-team squad ===
As of 4 February 2020.

Note: Flags indicate national team as defined under FIFA eligibility rules; some limited exceptions apply. Players may hold more than one non-FIFA nationality.

No.	Pos.	Nation	Player
1	GK	ALG	Mehdi Jeannin
2	DF	FRA	Pape Paye
3	DF	FRA	Nicolas Senzemba
4	DF	CMR	Adolphe Teikeu
5	DF	FRA	Maxence Lacroix
6	MF	SEN	Ousseynou Thioune
7	FW	FRA	Sofiane Diop (on loan from Monaco)
8	MF	ALG	Sofiane Daham
9	FW	GUF	Sloan Privat
10	FW	FRA	Fabien Ourega
12	FW	ENG	Tope Obadeyi
13	DF	FRA	Christopher Rocchia (on loan from Marseille)
14	FW	CIV	Thomas Touré (on loan from Angers)
15	FW	FRA	Bryan Lasme
16	GK	FRA	Maxence Prévot

No.	Pos.	Nation	Player
17	FW	SEN	Amadou Dia N'Diaye (on loan from Metz)
18	DF	SEN	Christophe Diedhiou
19	DF	FRA	Romain Sans
20	MF	FRA	Younès Kaabouni
21	MF	FRA	Melvin Sitti (on loan from Norwich City)
22	DF	COD	Salem Mbakata
23	DF	FRA	Boris Moltenis
25	MF	FRA	Rassoul Ndiaye
27	FW	SEN	Abdoulaye Sané
28	MF	FRA	Gaëtan Weissbeck
29	FW	FRA	Jérémy Livolant (on loan from Guingamp)
31	FW	FRA	Victor Glaentzlin
40	GK	FRA	Aubin Long
—	DF	FRA	Nathan Zohoré

=== Out on loan ===
Note: Flags indicate national team as defined under FIFA eligibility rules; some limited exceptions apply. Players may hold more than one non-FIFA nationality.

No.	Pos.	Nation	Player
—	DF	FRA	Rayan Senhadji (on loan at Béziers)
—	MF	FRA	Martin François (on loan at Villefranche)

No.	Pos.	Nation	Player
—	MF	FRA	Isaak Umbdenstock (on loan at Belfort)

=== Reserve squad ===
As of 2 August 2019

Note: Flags indicate national team as defined under FIFA eligibility rules; some limited exceptions apply. Players may hold more than one non-FIFA nationality.

No.	Pos.	Nation	Player
—	GK	FRA	Cheick Diarra
—	GK	FRA	Quentin Galvez
—	GK	FRA	Koca Agro
—	DF	FRA	Loic Cianti
—	DF	FRA	Jalen Segor
—	DF	FRA	Rodrigue N'Donda
—	DF	FRA	Marwan Trabelsi
—	DF	CGO	Aristode Youlou
—	DF	FRA	Koly Soumare
—	DF	FRA	Hugo Voirol
—	DF	FRA	Madibiramou Traore]
—	DF	FRA	Jésah Ayessa
—	MF	FRA	Malcolm Viltard
—	MF	FRA	Noor Arabat

No.	Pos.	Nation	Player
—	MF	CMR	Heidi Ngueumbeu
—	MF	FRA	Emmanuel Francois
—	MF	FRA	Darren-Kinsley Guere
—	MF	FRA	Coli Saco
—	MF	FRA	Toni Lesueur
—	MF	FRA	Melvin Sitti
—	FW	ANG	Wiltord Antonio
—	FW	FRA	Mehdi Bariki
—	FW	FRA	Cameron Djassougue
—	FW	FRA	Walid Jarmouni
—	FW	FRA	Natanael Ntoula
—	FW	FRA	Skelly Alvero
—	FW	CIV	Niava Behiratche
—	FW	FRA	Jessim Pelissard

== Pre-season and friendlies ==
Win Draw Loss

17 July 2020 Friendly	Sochaux (France)	3–0	(Switzerland) CS Chênois	Delle, France
16:00 CEST (UTC+2)	Ourega 41'; Ambri 67'; Virginius 69'	Report		Stadium: Stade des Fromentaux; Attendance: 500; Referee: Philippe Mercier

24 July 2020 Friendly	Sochaux (France)	2–1	(France) Sporting Club Lyon	Dole, France
19:00 CEST (UTC+2)	Weissbeck 84' (pen.); Semedo 87'	Report	Rivas 5'	Stadium: Robert Bobin Stadium; Attendance: 400; Referee: Antoine Valnet

28 July 2020 Friendly	Belfort (France)	2–4	(France) Sochaux	Belfort, France
19:00 CEST (UTC+2)	Souaré 78'; Nowa 83'	Report	Ourega 40'; Daham 53'; Thioune 58'; Lacroix 65'	Stadium: Stade Roger-Serzian; Attendance: 1,200; Referee: Antoine Valnet

1 August 2020 Friendly	Sochaux (France)	0–0	(France) Dijon	Besançon, France
16:00 CEST (UTC+2)		Report		Stadium: Stade Léo Lagrange; Attendance: 1,500; Referee: Antoine Valnet

5 August 2020 Friendly	Paris Saint-Germain (France)	1–0	(France) Sochaux	Paris, France
19:00 CEST (UTC+2)	Choupo-Moting 15'; Sarabia (yellow card) 39'	Report		Stadium: Parc de Princes; Attendance: 0 Referee: Bastien Dechepy
Note: Match was played in two 40-minutes halves.

8 August 2020 Friendly	Sochaux (France)	4–0	(France) ASC Saint-Apollinaire	Montbéliard, France
17:00 CEST (UTC+2)	Kitala 29' (pen.), 48'; Thioune 43'; Jarmouni 62'	Report		Stadium: Stade Auguste Bonal; Attendance: 0 Referee: William Toulliou

== Competitions ==
=== Overview ===
Competition	First match	Last match	Starting round	Final position	Record							
Competition	First match	Last match	Starting round	Final position	Pld	W	D	L	GF	GA	GD	Win %
Ligue 2	22 August 2020	23 May 2021	Matchday 1	7th	38	12	15	11	45	37	+8	31.58
Coupe de France	20 January 2021	6 March 2021	Eighth round	Round of 32	3	2	0	1	4	5	−1	66.67
Total					41	14	15	12	49	42	+7	34.15

Source: Soccerway

=== Ligue 2 ===
==== League table ====
Pos	Team	Pld	W	D	L	GF	GA	GD	Pts	Promotion or Relegation
5	Paris FC	38	17	13	8	53	37	+16	64	Qualification to promotion play-offs
6	Auxerre	38	16	14	8	64	43	+21	62	
7	Sochaux	38	12	15	11	45	37	+8	51	
8	Nancy	38	11	14	13	53	53	0	47	
9	Guingamp	38	10	17	11	41	43	−2	47	

Source: Ligue 2
Rules for classification: 1) Points; 2) Goal difference; 3) Number of goals scored; 4) Head-to-head goal difference; 5) Fair play points

==== Results summary ====
Overall								Home						Away					
Pld	W	D	L	GF	GA	GD	Pts	W	D	L	GF	GA	GD	W	D	L	GF	GA	GD
38	12	15	11	45	37	+8	51	6	7	6	24	22	+2	6	8	5	21	15	+6

Source: Ligue 2

==== Results by round ====
Round	1	2	3	4	5	6	7	8	9	10	11	12	13	14	15	16	17	18	19	20	21	22	23	24	25	26	27	28	29	30	31	32	33	34	35	36	37	38
Ground	A	H	A	H	A	H	A	H	A	H	A	H	A	H	A	H	A	H	H	A	H	A	H	A	H	A	H	A	H	A	H	A	H	A	H	A	A	H
Result	W	W	D	D	D	W	D	L	D	L	L	W	D	D	D	D	W	W	D	L	L	D	L	W	W	W	D	W	D	W	L	D	D	L	W	L	L	L
Position	3	2	3	4	5	3	3	5	6	10	12	8	9	11	10	10	8	7	7	7	8	9	10	7	7	7	7	7	7	7	7	7	7	7	7	7	7	7

Source: Ligue 2
A = Away; H = Home; W = Win; D = Draw; L = Loss

==== Matches ====
The league fixtures were announced on 9 July 2020.

22 August 2020 1	Auxerre	0–2	Sochaux	Auxerre
19:00 CEST (UTC+2)		Report	Diedhiou 3'; Kitala 46'	Stadium: Stade de l'Abbé-Deschamps; Referee: Mehdi Mokhtari

29 August 2020 2	Sochaux	2–1	Troyes	Montbéliard
19:00 CEST (UTC+2)	Lopy 29'; Weissbeck 84'	Report	Ba 90'	Stadium: Stade Auguste Bonal; Referee: Mikael Lesage

14 September 2020 3	Toulouse	0–0	Sochaux	Toulouse
20:45 CEST (UTC+2)	Adli (yellow card) 9'; Amian (yellow card) 65'; Healey (yellow card) 90+1'	Report	Soumaré (yellow card) 26'; Bedia (yellow card) 38'; Paye (yellow card) 61'; Ambri (yellow card) 80'; Ndiaye (yellow card) 90+3'	Stadium: Stadium de Toulouse; Referee: Johan Hamel

19 September 2020 4	Sochaux	2–2	Rodez	Montbéliard
19:00 CEST (UTC+2)	Bedia 68' (pen.); Weissbeck 84'	Report	Boissier 15', 45+2'	Stadium: Stade Auguste Bonal; Attendance: 4,970; Referee: Jérôme Brisard

26 September 2020 5	Ajaccio	1–1	Sochaux	Ajaccio
19:00 CEST (UTC+2)	Barreto 11'	Report	Ambri 48'	Stadium: Stade François Coty; Attendance: 2,279; Referee: Benoît Millot

3 October 2020 6	Sochaux	3–2	Chambly	Montbéliard
19:00 CEST (UTC+2)	Weissbeck 24', 48'; Lopy (yellow card) 50'; Ambri (yellow card) 70'; Niane 89'	Report	Correa 8'; Flochon (yellow card) 34'; Šušnjara (yellow card) 47'; Beaulieu (yellow card) 84'; Danger 88'	Stadium: Stade Auguste Bonal; Referee: Arnaud Baert

17 October 2020 7	Valenciennes	0–0	Sochaux	Valenciennes
19:00 CEST (UTC+2)	Masson (yellow card) 5'; Ntim (yellow card) 40'; Spano (yellow card) 82'; Elogo (yellow card) 90+1'	Report	Pogba (yellow card) 19'; Weissbeck (yellow card) 45+2'; Niane (yellow card) 71'; Ourega (yellow card) 90+5'	Stadium: Stade du Hainaut; Referee: Pierre Gaillouste

26 October 2020 8	Sochaux	0–2	Amiens	Montbéliard
19:00 CEST (UTC+2)	Ourega (yellow card) 43'; Pogba (yellow card) 45'; Thioune (yellow card) 45'; Soumaré (yellow card) 45+1'; Ndour (yellow card) 78' (yellow-red card) 90'	Report	Mendoza (penalty missed) 14'; Sy (yellow card) 19'; Papeau (yellow card) 85'; Ciss 90+2' (pen.); Timite 90+3'	Stadium: Stade Auguste Bonal; Referee: Jérémy Stinat

31 October 2020 9	Guingamp	0–0	Sochaux	Guingamp
19:00 CET (UTC+1)	Mellot (yellow card) 38'	Report	Bedia (red card) 64'	Stadium: Stade de Roudourou; Referee: Sylvain Palhies

7 November 2020 10	Sochaux	3–4	Niort	Montbéliard
19:00 CET (UTC+1)	Lasme 32' (pen.); Diedhiou (yellow card) 62'; Weissbeck 79', 84'	Report	Boutobba 9'; Louiserre 29', 68'; Vallier (yellow card) 45+1'; Bâ 66'; Mendes (yellow card) 89'	Stadium: Stade Auguste Bonal; Referee: Romain Lissorgue

21 November 2020 11	Châteauroux	2–1	Sochaux	Châteauroux
19:00 CET (UTC+1)	Fofana (yellow card) 24'; Opéri (yellow card) 75'; Sunu 90+1'; Gonçalves 90+3'	Report	Lasme 18'; Lopy (yellow card) 49'	Stadium: Stade Gaston Petit; Referee: Bartolomeu Varela

28 November 2020 12	Sochaux	4–0	Le Havre	Montbéliard
19:00 CET (UTC+1)	Bedia 9', 15'; Lasme 21' (pen.); Weissbeck 65'; Virginius (yellow card) 84'	Report		Stadium: Stade Auguste Bonal; Referee: Mehdi Mokhtari

1 December 2020 13	Paris FC	0–0	Sochaux	Paris
19:00 CET (UTC+1)	Name (yellow card) 67'	Report	Lasme (yellow card) 34'	Stadium: Stade Sébastien Charléty; Referee: Abdelatif Kherradji

5 December 2020 14	Sochaux	1–1	Nancy	Montbéliard
19:00 CET (UTC+1)	Virginius 51'; Diedhiou (red card) 59'	Report	Karamoko (yellow card) 75'; Rocha Santos 57'; Fischer (yellow card) 81'	Stadium: Stade Auguste Bonal; Referee: Arnaud Baert

15 December 2020 15	Pau	0–0	Sochaux	Pau
20:00 CET (UTC+1)	Kouassi (yellow card) 32'	Report	Bedia (yellow card) 52'	Stadium: Stade du Hameau; Referee: Sylvain Palhies

18 December 2020 16	Sochaux	1–1	Grenoble	Montbéliard
20:00 CET (UTC+1)	Ourega (yellow card) 12'; Thioune (yellow card) 14'; Bedia (red card) 32'; Lasme 40'; Pogba (yellow card) 45+3'; Ambri (yellow card) 74'	Report	Djitté 17' (yellow card) 61'; Mombris (yellow card) 27'; Tapoko (yellow card) 38'	Stadium: Stade Auguste Bonal; Referee: Benjamin Lepaysant

22 December 2020 17	Caen	1–4	Sochaux	Caen
20:00 (CET) (UTC+1)	Beka Beka 7', (yellow card) 18'; Oniangué (yellow card) 24'; Weber (yellow card) 43'; Deminguet (yellow card) 53'	Report	Soumaré 6'; Weissbeck (yellow card) 16'; Niane 36'; Lasme 37', 45' (pen.)	Stadium: Stade Michel d'Ornano; Referee: Frank Schneider

5 January 2021 18	Sochaux	1–0	Dunkerque	Montbéliard
20:00 CET (UTC+1)	Lasme (yellow card) 25'; Lopy (yellow card) 58'; Weissbeck 63'	Report	Thiam (yellow card) 41'; Kerrouche (yellow card) 45+3'; Dudouit (yellow card) 84'	Stadium: Stade Auguste Bonal; Referee: Mathieu Vernice

8 January 2021 19	Sochaux	0–0	Clermont	Montbéliard
20:00 CET (UTC+1)	Paye (yellow card) 44'	Report	Magnin (yellow card) 41'; Seidu (yellow card) 71'	Stadium: Stade Auguste Bonal; Referee: Romain Delpech

16 January 2021 20	Troyes	2–1	Sochaux	Troyes
15:00 CET (UTC+1)	Tardieu 13', 68' (pen.); El Hajjam (yellow card) 36'; Chambost (yellow card) 90'	Report	Ambri (yellow card) 12'; Thioune (yellow card) 32'; Soumaré 60'; Lopy (yellow card) 67'	Stadium: Stade de l'Aube; Referee: Rémi Landry

22 January 2021 21	Sochaux	0–1	Toulouse	Montbéliard
20:45 CET (UTC+1)	Lasme (yellow card) 39'; M'Bakata (yellow card) 55'; Ambri (yellow card) 90+1'	Report	Diakité 54' van den Boomen (yellow card) 75'; Koné (yellow card) 90+4'	Stadium: Stade Auguste Bonal; Referee: Mehdi Mokhtari

30 January 2021 22	Rodez	1–1	Sochaux	Rodez
19:00 CET (UTC+1)	Douline 89'	Report	Lasme (yellow card) 40'; Ourega (red card) 72'; Bedia 76'; Ambri (yellow card) 88'	Stadium: Stade Paul-Lignon; Referee: Sylvain Palhies

2 February 2021 23	Sochaux	0–2	Ajaccio	Montbéliard
20:00 CET (UTC+1)	Diedhiou (red card) 44'; Niane (penalty missed) 68'	Report	Courtet 45+1' (pen.); Barreto 46'; Sainati (yellow card) 84'	Stadium: Stade Auguste Bonal; Referee: Jérôme Miguelgorry

5 February 2021 24	Chambly	1–4	Sochaux	Chambly
20:00 CET (UTC+1)	El Hriti (yellow card) 11'; Lopy 35' (o.g.); Guezoui (yellow card) 57'	Report	Ndour (yellow card) 42'; Lasme 47'; Kaabouni (yellow card) 51'; Virginius 54', 60'; Bedia 89'	Stadium: Stade Pierre Brisson; Referee: Mathieu Vernice

15 February 2021 25	Sochaux	2–0	Valenciennes	Montbéliard
19:00 CET (UTC+1)	Weissbeck 14'; Mbakata (yellow card) 19'; Lopy (yellow card) 28'; Niane 76'	Report	Picouleau (yellow card) 39'	Stadium: Stade Auguste Bonal; Referee: Bartolomeu Varela

20 February 2021 26	Amiens	0–1	Sochaux	Amiens
19:00 CET (UTC+1)	Coly (yellow card) 24'; Bianchini (yellow card) 86'	Report	Weissbeck (yellow card) 43'; Ourega (yellow card) 56'; Bedia 65'	Stadium: Stade de la Licorne; Referee: Abdelatif Kherradji

27 February 2021 27	Sochaux	0–0	Guingamp	Montbéliard
19:00 CET (UTC+1)		Report	Niakaté (yellow card) 22'; Romao (yellow card) 51'	Stadium: Stade Auguste Bonal; Referee: Arnaud Baert

2 March 2021 28	Niort	1–3	Sochaux	Niort
20:00 CET (UTC+1)	Mendes 31'; Yongwa (red card) 57'; Jacob (yellow card) 74'; Michel (yellow card) 83'	Report	Ambri 12', (yellow card) 54'; Niane 29'; Weissbeck (yellow card) 73', (goal) 84' (pen.)	Stadium: Stade René Gaillard; Referee: Pierre Gaillouste

13 March 2021 29	Sochaux	0–0	Châteauroux	Montbéliard
20:00 CET (UTC+1)	Thioune (yellow card) 61'	Report	Mulumba (yellow card) 21'; Sunu (yellow card) 31'; Sidibé (yellow card) 48'	Stadium: Stade Auguste Bonal; Referee: Nicolas Rainville

20 March 2021 30	Le Havre	0–2	Sochaux	Le Havre
20:00 CET (UTC+1)	Meraş (yellow card) 43'; Mayembo (yellow card) 90+3'	Report	Ourega 37'; Bedia 77', (yellow card) 90'; Kaabouni (yellow card) 84'; Virginius (yellow card) 90+4'	Stadium: Stade Océane; Referee: Rémi Landry

3 April 2021 31	Sochaux	1–2	Paris FC	Montbéliard
20:00 CET (UTC+1)	Paye (yellow card) 11'; Weissbeck (yellow card) 32'; Martial (yellow card) 67'; Ndour (yellow card) 83'; Bedia 90+3'	Report	Laura 6'; Kanté (yellow card) 42' (yellow-red card) 58'; Abdi 70'	Stadium: Stade Auguste Bonal; Referee: Romain Delpech

10 April 2021 32	Nancy	0–0	Sochaux	Tomblaine
20:00 CEST (UTC+2)	Ciss (yellow card) 43'	Report	Martial (yellow card) 45+1'	Stadium: Stade Marcel Picot; Attendance: 0 Referee: Mehdi Mokhtari

17 April 2021 33	Sochaux	1–1	Pau	Montbéliard
20:00 CEST (UTC+2)	Ambri 12'; Sans (yellow card) 84'; Thioune (yellow card) 87'	Report	Batisse 56'	Stadium: Stade Auguste Bonal; Referee: Abdelatif Kherradji

20 April 2021 34	Grenoble	2–0	Sochaux	Grenoble
20:00 CET (UTC+1)	Bénet 13' (pen.), 78' (pen.); Djitté (yellow card) 38'; Tapoko (yellow card) 65'; H. Demba (yellow card) 82'	Report	Ambri (yellow card) 61'; Ourega (yellow card) 78'	Stadium: Stade des Alpes; Referee: Bartolomeu Varela

24 April 2021 35	Sochaux	1–0	Caen	Montbéliard
20:00 CEST (UTC+2)	Weissbeck (penalty missed) 7'; Soumaré (yellow card) 19'; Bedia 64' (pen.); Mbakata (yellow card) 76'	Report	Deminguet (yellow card) 9'; Oniangué (yellow card) 34'; Rivierez (yellow card) 79'	Stadium: Stade Auguste Bonal; Referee: Nicolas Rainville

1 May 2021 36	Dunkerque	1–0	Sochaux	Dunkerque
20:00 CET (UTC+1)	Dudouit (yellow card) 10'; Bosca 84'	Report	Bedia (penalty missed) 18'; Weissbeck (yellow card) 37'; Ndour (red card) 68'; Thioune (yellow card) 90+2'	Stadium: Stade Marcel-Tribut; Referee: Alexandre Perreau Niel

8 May 2021 37	Clermont	3–1	Sochaux	Clermont-Ferrand
20:00 CEST (UTC+2)	Bayo 8'; Dossou 34'; Allevinah 50'	Report	Soumaré 28' (pen.); Thioune (yellow card) 36'; Ambri (yellow card) 80'	Stadium: Stade Gabriel Montpied; Referee: Romain Delpech

15 May 2021 38	Sochaux	2–3	Auxerre	Montbéliard
20:00 CEST (UTC+2)	Lasme 43', 53'	Report	Hein 48'; Dugimont 61', 64'	Stadium: Stade Auguste Bonal; Referee: Bartolomeu Varela

=== Coupe de France ===
20 January 2021 Eighth round	Nancy	0–1	Sochaux	Nancy
18:30 CET (UTC+1)		Report	El Kaoutari 60' (o.g.)	Stadium: Stade Marcel Picot; Attendance: 0 Referee: Benjamin Lepaysant

11 February 2021 Round of 64	Sochaux	1–0	Saint-Étienne	Montbéliard
18:45 CET (UTC+1)	Bedia 5'; Ambri (yellow card) 90+2'	Report	Cissé (yellow card) 37'	Stadium: Stade Auguste Bonal; Attendance: 0 Referee: Jérémy Stinat

6 March 2021 Round of 32	Lyon	5–2	Sochaux	Décines-Charpieu
18:45 CET (UTC+1)	Benlamri 8', (yellow card) 30'; Cornet 10'; Cherki 45', 87'; Denayer 77'	Report	Ndour (yellow card) 40'; Bedia 41', 56'	Stadium: Parc Olympique Lyonnais; Attendance: 0 Referee: Eric Wattellier

== Statistics ==
=== Goalscorers ===
As of 22 August 2020

Rank	No.	Pos	Nat	Name	Ligue 2	Coupe de France	Total
1	18	DF	(Senegal)	Christophe Diedhiou	1	0	1
1	9	FW	(Democratic Republic of the Congo)	Yann Kitala	1	0	1
Totals					2	0	2
