= 2020–21 Norwich City F.C. season =

Norwich City
2020–21 season
- Owner: Delia Smith and Michael Wynn-Jones
- Head coach: Daniel Farke
- Stadium: Carrow Road
- EFL Championship: 1st (promoted)
- FA Cup: Fourth round
- EFL Cup: First round
- Top goalscorer: League: Teemu Pukki (26); All: Teemu Pukki (26)
Home colours	Away colours	Third colours

The 2020–21 Norwich City F.C. season was the club's 119th season in existence and the first season back in the second tier of English football. In addition to the domestic league, Norwich City participated in this season's editions of the FA Cup and the EFL Cup.

== Players ==
=== First-team squad ===
As of 7 October 2020

Note: Flags indicate national team as defined under FIFA eligibility rules; some limited exceptions apply. Players may hold more than one non-FIFA nationality.

No.	Pos.	Nation	Player
1	GK	NED	Tim Krul
2	DF	ENG	Max Aarons
3	DF	ENG	Sam Byram
5	DF	SCO	Grant Hanley (captain)
6	DF	GER	Christoph Zimmermann (4th captain)
7	MF	GER	Lukas Rupp
8	MF	BIH	Mario Vrančić
9	FW	ENG	Jordan Hugill
10	MF	ENG	Kieran Dowell
11	MF	POL	Przemysław Płacheta
12	GK	NOR	Ørjan Nyland
14	MF	ENG	Todd Cantwell
16	DF	ESP	Xavi Quintillà (on loan from Villarreal)
17	MF	ARG	Emiliano Buendía
18	MF	GER	Marco Stiepermann

No.	Pos.	Nation	Player
19	MF	DEN	Jacob Sørensen
20	MF	ENG	Oliver Skipp (on loan from Tottenham Hotspur)
22	FW	FIN	Teemu Pukki
23	MF	SCO	Kenny McLean
24	MF	ENG	Josh Martin
25	MF	CUB	Onel Hernández
26	DF	ENG	Bali Mumba
27	MF	NOR	Alexander Tettey (vice-captain)
30	DF	GRE	Dimitris Giannoulis (on loan from PAOK)
33	GK	NIR	Michael McGovern
34	DF	ENG	Ben Gibson (on loan from Burnley)
35	FW	IRL	Adam Idah
38	GK	ENG	Aston Oxborough
—	MF	GER	Moritz Leitner
—	FW	USA	Sebastian Soto

== Transfers ==
=== Transfers in ===
Date	Position	Nationality	Name	From	Fee	Ref.
1 July 2020	LW	(Luxembourg)	Danel Sinani	(Luxembourg) F91 Dudelange	Free transfer	
20 July 2020	CM	(Denmark)	Jacob Sørensen	(Denmark) Esbjerg fB	Undisclosed (Note: Fee reported to be £990,000.)	
22 July 2020	LW	(Poland)	Przemysław Płacheta	(Poland) Śląsk Wrocław	Undisclosed (Note: Fee reported to be £2,700,000.)	
27 July 2020	DM	(England)	Bali Mumba	(England) Sunderland	Undisclosed (Note: Fee reported to be £347,000.)	
28 July 2020	CF	(United States)	Sebastian Soto	(Germany) Hannover 96	Free transfer	
28 July 2020	CM	(England)	Matthew Dennis	(England) Arsenal	Free transfer	
30 July 2020	AM	(England)	Kieran Dowell	(England) Everton	Undisclosed (Note: Fee reported to be £1,980,000.)	
24 August 2020	CF	(England)	Jordan Hugill	(England) West Ham United	Undisclosed (Note: Fee reported to be £2,970,000.)	
1 February 2021	GK	(Norway)	Ørjan Nyland	(England) Aston Villa	Free transfer	
1 February 2021	AM	(England)	Regan Riley	(England) Bolton Wanderers	£250,000	

=== Loans in ===
Date from	Position	Nationality	Name	From	Date until	Ref.
17 August 2020	DM	(England)	Oliver Skipp	(England) Tottenham Hotspur	End of season	
17 August 2020	LB	(Spain)	Xavi Quintillà	(Spain) Villarreal	End of season	
4 September 2020	CB	(England)	Ben Gibson	(England) Burnley	End of season	
19 January 2021	LB	(Greece)	Dimitris Giannoulis	(Greece) PAOK	End of season (Note: Included a loan fee of £900,000.)	

=== Loans out ===
Date from	Position	Nationality	Name	To	Date until	Ref.
1 July 2020	CB	(Belgium)	Rocky Bushiri	(Belgium) KV Mechelen	25 January 2021	
20 July 2020	GK	(Scotland)	Archie Mair	(England) King's Lynn Town	End of season	
20 July 2020	CM	(Iceland)	Ísak Þorvaldsson	(Scotland) St Mirren	27 August 2020	
24 July 2020	CF	(England)	Carlton Morris	(England) Milton Keynes Dons	5 January 2021	
29 July 2020	SS	(Morocco)	Gassan Ahadme	(Spain) Real Oviedo	End of season	
5 August 2020	RW	(Republic of Ireland)	Simon Power	(England) King's Lynn Town	17 January 2021	
7 August 2020	CB	(England)	Matt Richardson	(England) Leiston	End of season	
18 August 2020	LB	(Germany)	Philip Heise	(Germany) Karlsruher SC	End of season	
18 August 2020	DM	(Wales)	Louis Thompson	(England) Milton Keynes Dons	End of season	
24 August 2020	RW	(Scotland)	Aidan Fitzpatrick	(Scotland) Queen of The South	End of season	
26 August 2020	CM	(England)	Daniel Adshead	(Netherlands) SC Telstar	End of season	
26 August 2020	CF	(United States)	Sebastian Soto	(Netherlands) SC Telstar	21 January 2021	
27 August 2020	CM	(Iceland)	Ísak Þorvaldsson	(Iceland) ÍA	31 December 2020	
1 September 2020	GK	(England)	Joe Rose	(England) Bury Town	End of season	
2 September 2020	RB	(England)	Jordan Thomas	(England) Leyton Orient	End of season	
11 September 2020	LB	(England)	Caleb Richards	(England) Kidderminster Harriers	End of season	
16 September 2020	CB	(England)	Louis Lomas	(England) Slough Town	End of season	
20 September 2020	LB	(England)	Sam McCallum	(England) Coventry City	End of season	
22 September 2020	LW	(Luxembourg)	Danel Sinani	(Belgium) Waasland-Beveren	End of season	
22 September 2020	DM	(France)	Melvin Sitti	(Belgium) Waasland-Beveren	25 January 2021	
26 September 2020	CB	(England)	Akin Famewo	(England) Charlton Athletic	End of season	
7 October 2020	CB	(Switzerland)	Timm Klose	(Switzerland) Basel	End of season	
16 October 2020	DM	(Germany)	Tom Trybull	(England) Blackburn Rovers	End of season	
6 January 2021	CM	(Republic of Ireland)	William Hondermarck	(England) Harrogate Town	End of season	
25 January 2021	CF	(Belgium)	Tyrese Omotoye	(England) Swindon Town	End of season	
26 January 2021	CB	(Belgium)	Rocky Bushiri	(Belgium) Eupen	End of season	
5 February 2021	CF	(Switzerland)	Josip Drmić	(Croatia) Rijeka	End of season	

=== Transfers out ===
Date	Position	Nationality	Name	To	Fee	Ref.
1 July 2020	LB	(England)	Arash Ahmadi	(England) Glossop North End	Released	
1 July 2020	CB	(England)	Anthonius Berkeley	Unattached	Released	
1 July 2020	CF	(England)	Mason Bloomfield	(England) Hartlepool United	Released	
1 July 2020	RW	(England)	Diallang Jaiyesimi	(England) Swindon Town	Released	
1 July 2020	GK	(England)	Billy Johnson	(England) Stevenage	Released	
1 July 2020	CM	(Greece)	Savvas Mourgos	(Greece) Veria	Released	
1 July 2020	CB	(England)	Timi Odusina	(England) Hartlepool United	Released	
1 July 2020	DM	(England)	Alfie Payne	(England) Braintree Town	Released	
1 July 2020	DM	(England)	Tom Scully	(England) Accrington Stanley	Released	
22 July 2020	CB	(England)	Sean Raggett	(England) Portsmouth	Released	
31 August 2020	GK	(England)	Nick Hayes	(England) Salford City	Free transfer	
8 September 2020	LB	(Northern Ireland)	Jamal Lewis	(England) Newcastle United	Undisclosed (Note: Fee reported to be £14,850,000.)	
2 October 2020	FW	(England)	Ruben Shakpoke	(England) Aston Villa	Compensation	
5 October 2020	CB	(England)	Ben Godfrey	(England) Everton	Undisclosed (Note: Fee reported to be £24,750,000.)	
16 October 2020	CB	(England)	Ciaren Jones	(England) South Shields	Free transfer	
19 October 2020	DM	(Scotland)	Charlie Gilmour	(Scotland) St Johnstone	Mutual consent	
6 January 2021	CF	(England)	Carlton Morris	(England) Barnsley	Undisclosed	
18 January 2021	RM	(Republic of Ireland)	Simon Power	(England) Harrogate Town	Undisclosed	
1 February 2021	DM	(England)	Saul Milovanovic	Unattached	Mutual consent	

== Pre-season and friendlies ==
Win	Draw	Loss

Norwich City confirmed they would play Milton Keynes Dons, SC Verl, Dynamo Dresden and Darmstadt 98 during pre-season.

Date	Time	Opponent	Venue	Result (Note: Norwich City's score shown first)	Scorers	Attendance	Ref.
21 August 2020	16:00	Milton Keynes Dons	Home (Note: Match took place at Lotus Training Centre)	6–0	Martin 15', 23', Stiepermann 53', Idah 74', Hernández 79', Buendía 86'	0 (Note: Match played behind closed doors)	
24 August 2020	17:00	SC Verl	Away	3–0	Dowell 15', Idah 23', Klose 58'	0	
26 August 2020	16:00	Dynamo Dresden	Away (Note: Match took place at Laumeskamp Delbrück in Delbrück, Germany)	2–0	Pukki 12', Hugill 82'	0	
29 August 2020	11:00	Darmstadt 98	Away (Note: Match took place at Hotel Residence Klosterpforte in Harsewinkel, Germany)	3–2	Płacheta 8', Pukki 24', Martin 61'	0	
29 August 2020	13:00	Darmstadt 98	Away	0–0		0	

== Competitions ==
=== Overview ===
Competition	First match	Last match	Starting round	Final position	Record							
Competition	First match	Last match	Starting round	Final position	Pld	W	D	L	GF	GA	GD	Win %
EFL Championship	12 September 2020	8 May 2021	Matchday 1	Winners	46	29	10	7	75	36	+39	63.04
FA Cup	9 January 2021	23 January 2021	Third round	Fourth round	2	1	0	1	2	1	+1	50.00
EFL Cup	5 September 2020		First round	First round	1	0	0	1	1	3	−2	0.00
Total					49	30	10	9	78	40	+38	61.22

Last updated: 8 May 2021
Source: Soccerway

=== EFL Championship ===
==== League table ====
Pos	Team	Pld	W	D	L	GF	GA	GD	Pts	Promotion, qualification or relegation
1	Norwich City (C, P)	46	29	10	7	75	36	+39	97	Promotion to the Premier League
2	Watford (P)	46	27	10	9	63	30	+33	91	Promotion to the Premier League
3	Brentford (O, P)	46	24	15	7	79	42	+37	87	Qualification for Championship play-offs
4	Swansea City	46	23	11	12	56	39	+17	80	Qualification for Championship play-offs
5	Barnsley	46	23	9	14	58	50	+8	78	Qualification for Championship play-offs
6	Bournemouth	46	22	11	13	73	46	+27	77	Qualification for Championship play-offs

Source: EFL Official Website
Rules for classification: 1) Points; 2) Goal difference; 3) Number of goals scored; 4) Head-to-head results; 5) Wins; 6) Away goals; 7) Penalty points (sec 9.5); 8) 12-point sending off offences
(C) Champions; (O) Play-off winners; (P) Promoted

==== Results summary ====
Overall								Home						Away					
Pld	W	D	L	GF	GA	GD	Pts	W	D	L	GF	GA	GD	W	D	L	GF	GA	GD
46	29	10	7	75	36	+39	97	14	6	3	39	15	+24	15	4	4	36	21	+15

Last updated: 8 May 2021.

==== Results by matchday ====
Matchday	1	2	3	4	5	6	7	8	9	10	11	12	13	14	15	16	17	18	19	20	21	22	23	24	25	26	27	28	29	30	31	32	33	34	35	36	37	38	39	40	41	42	43	44	45	46
Ground	A	H	A	H	A	H	H	A	A	H	H	A	A	H	A	H	H	A	A	H	A	H	H	A	H	H	A	A	H	A	H	A	A	H	H	A	A	H	A	H	A	H	H	A	H	A
Result	W	D	L	L	W	W	W	D	W	D	W	W	W	D	L	W	W	W	W	W	L	D	W	W	W	D	D	L	W	W	W	W	W	W	W	W	W	D	D	W	W	L	L	W	W	D
Position	6	5	13	17	11	8	5	7	4	3	3	1	1	1	1	1	1	1	1	1	1	1	1	1	1	1	1	1	1	1	1	1	1	1	1	1	1	1	1	1	1	1	1	1	1	1

Updated to match(es) played on 8 May 2021. Source:
A = Away; H = Home; W = Win; D = Draw; L = Loss

==== Matches ====
The league fixtures were announced on 21 August 2020.

12 September 2020 1	Huddersfield Town	0–1	Norwich City	Huddersfield
15:00 BST	Brown (yellow card) 88'	Report	Dowell (yellow card) 58'; Cantwell (yellow card) 77'; Idah 80', (yellow card) 90+2'	Stadium: Kirklees Stadium; Attendance: 0 Referee: Geoff Eltringham

19 September 2020 2	Norwich City	2–2	Preston North End	Norwich
15:00 BST	Pukki 31'; Quintillà (yellow card) 47'; Płacheta 85'	Report	Sinclair 14' (pen.), (yellow card) 82'; Fisher (yellow card) 34', (goal) 42'	Stadium: Carrow Road; Attendance: 1,000; Referee: John Brooks

27 September 2020 3	Bournemouth	1–0	Norwich City	Bournemouth
16:00 BST	Danjuma 35'; Rico (yellow card) 71'	Report	McLean (yellow card) 37'	Stadium: Dean Court; Attendance: 0 Referee: James Linington

3 October 2020 4	Norwich City	0–1	Derby County	Norwich
12:30 BST	Buendía (yellow card) 44'; Zimmermann (yellow card) 54'; Rupp (yellow card) 86'	Report	Knight (yellow card) 79'; Shinnie (yellow card) 79'; Rooney 87'	Stadium: Carrow Road; Attendance: 0 Referee: Stuart Attwell

17 October 2020 5	Rotherham United	1–2	Norwich City	Rotherham
15:00 BST	Ladapo 3'; MacDonald (red card) 70'; Crooks (yellow card) 90+6'	Report	Hanley (yellow card) 56'; Ihiekwe 68' (o.g.); Hugill 90+5' (pen.)	Stadium: New York Stadium; Attendance: 0 Referee: David Webb

20 October 2020 6	Norwich City	1–0	Birmingham City	Norwich
19:45 BST	Vrančić 87'; Idah (yellow card) 89'	Report	Clayton (yellow card) 50' (yellow-red card) 86'; Dean (yellow card) 54'; Friend (yellow card) 88'; Šunjić (yellow card) 90'	Stadium: Carrow Road; Attendance: 0 Referee: Oliver Langford

24 October 2020 7	Norwich City	2–1	Wycombe Wanderers	Norwich
15:00 BST	Pukki 3'; Gibson (yellow card) 15'; Vrančić 90+1'; Idah (red card) 90+5'	Report	Kashket 12'; Onyedinma (yellow card) 45+4'	Stadium: Carrow Road; Attendance: 0 Referee: Gavin Ward

27 October 2020 8	Brentford	1–1	Norwich City	Brentford
19:45 GMT	Toney 27'; Janelt (yellow card) 80'	Report	Gibson (yellow card) 78'; McLean 87'	Stadium: Brentford Community Stadium; Attendance: 0 Referee: Jeremy Simpson

31 October 2020 9	Bristol City	1–3	Norwich City	Bristol
12:30 GMT	Hunt 15'	Report	Pukki 6', 14'; Buendía 45+2'; Sørensen (yellow card) 60'; Gibson (yellow card) 66'; Krul (yellow card) 73'; Rupp (yellow card) 77'	Stadium: Ashton Gate; Attendance: 0 Referee: Jarred Gillett

3 November 2020 10	Norwich City	0–0	Millwall	Norwich
19:00 GMT		Report	Woods (yellow card) 52'	Stadium: Carrow Road; Attendance: 0 Referee: Tim Robinson

7 November 2020 11	Norwich City	1–0	Swansea City	Norwich
15:00 GMT	Stiepermann 84'; Aarons (yellow card) 88'	Report	Guehi (yellow card) 17'; Naughton (yellow card) 36'; Bennett (yellow card) 38'; Fulton (yellow card) 55'	Stadium: Carrow Road; Attendance: 0 Referee: Darren England

21 November 2020 12	Middlesbrough	0–1	Norwich City	Middlesbrough
15:00 GMT		Report	Sørensen (yellow card) 15'; Pukki 72' (pen.)	Stadium: Riverside Stadium; Attendance: 0 Referee: Tony Harrington

24 November 2020 13	Stoke City	2–3	Norwich City	Stoke-on-Trent
19:00 GMT	Batth (yellow card) 18'; Fletcher (yellow card) 28'; Campbell 70'; Collins 79'	Report	Buendía 18', (yellow card) 64' (yellow-red card) 69'; Stiepermann (yellow card) 23'; Pukki 27', 57'; Hanley (yellow card) 58'	Stadium: Bet365 Stadium; Attendance: 0 Referee: Geoff Eltringham

28 November 2020 14	Norwich City	1–1	Coventry City	Norwich
15:00 GMT	Vrančić 27' (pen.); Sørensen (yellow card) 55'; Aarons (yellow card) 90+2'	Report	Biamou 89'	Stadium: Carrow Road; Attendance: 0 Referee: Keith Stroud

2 December 2020 15	Luton Town	3–1	Norwich City	Luton
19:45 GMT	Moncur 15'; Shea (yellow card) 18'; Pearson 22'; Collins 47' (pen.)	Report	Buendía 19' (pen.); Płacheta (yellow card) 33'; Zimmermann (yellow card) 85'	Stadium: Kenilworth Road; Attendance: 1,000; Referee: Darren England

5 December 2020 16	Norwich City	2–1	Sheffield Wednesday	Norwich
15:00 GMT	Skipp (yellow card) 79'; Martin 81'; Aarons 84'	Report	Odubajo (yellow card) 22'; Windass 60'; Börner (yellow card) 70'	Stadium: Carrow Road; Attendance: 2,000; Referee: Jarred Gillett

9 December 2020 17	Norwich City	2–1	Nottingham Forest	Norwich
19:45 GMT	Sørensen 45+3'; Skipp (yellow card) 53'; Buendía (yellow card) 59', (goal) 77'; Aarons (yellow card) 74'; Cantwell (yellow card) 87'	Report	Sow (yellow card) 27'; Knockaert 73'	Stadium: Carrow Road; Attendance: 2,000; Referee: Darren Bond

12 December 2020 18	Blackburn Rovers	1–2	Norwich City	Blackburn
15:00 GMT	Elliott 59'	Report	Pukki 22', 65', (yellow card) 84'	Stadium: Ewood Park; Attendance: 0 Referee: Dean Whitestone

16 December 2020 19	Reading	1–2	Norwich City	Reading
20:00 GMT	Olise 14'; Onen (yellow card) 83'	Report	Buendía 11'; Pukki 55' (pen.)	Stadium: Madejski Stadium; Attendance: 2,000; Referee: Geoff Eltringham

19 December 2020 20	Norwich City	2–0	Cardiff City	Norwich
12:30 GMT	Buendía 27'; Cantwell 70'	Report	Nelson (yellow card) 54'; Ojo (yellow card) 57'; Bacuna (yellow card) 82'; Wilson (yellow card) 90+5'	Stadium: Carrow Road; Attendance: 2,000; Referee: Tim Robinson

26 December 2020 21	Watford	1–0	Norwich City	Watford
19:45 GMT	Capoue (yellow card) 18'; Sarr 39', (yellow card) 78'; Cleverley (yellow card) 63'; Hughes (yellow card) 87'	Report		Stadium: Vicarage Road; Attendance: 0 Referee: John Brooks

29 December 2020 22	Norwich City	1–1	Queens Park Rangers	Norwich
19:45 GMT	Pukki 75' (pen.); Zimmermann (yellow card) 84'; McLean (yellow card) 87'; Skipp (yellow card) 90'	Report	Kane (yellow card) 22'; Ball (yellow card) 73'; Dickie (yellow card) 75'; Osayi-Samuel 84' (pen.), (yellow card) 90+1'; Carroll (yellow card) 88'; Bonne (yellow card) 90+4'	Stadium: Carrow Road; Attendance: 0 Referee: Oliver Langford

2 January 2021 23	Norwich City	1–0	Barnsley	Norwich
15:00 GMT	Buendía 62'	Report	James (yellow card) 61'	Stadium: Carrow Road; Attendance: 0 Referee: Michael Salisbury

16 January 2021 24	Cardiff City	1–2	Norwich City	Cardiff
15:00 GMT	Bacuna (yellow card) 34'; Pack (yellow card) 54' (yellow-red card) 70'; Hoilett (yellow card) 57'; Ralls 65'; Wilson (yellow card) 89'	Report	Hanley 3'; Cantwell 22'	Stadium: Cardiff City Stadium; Attendance: 0 Referee: Tony Harrington

20 January 2021 25	Norwich City	2–0	Bristol City	Norwich
18:00 GMT	Hugill 36', 76'; Cantwell (yellow card) 51'	Report	Palmer (yellow card) 51'; Vyner (yellow card) 76'	Stadium: Carrow Road; Attendance: 0 Referee: James Linington

30 January 2021 26	Norwich City	0–0	Middlesbrough	Norwich
12:30 GMT	Buendía (yellow card) 41' (yellow-red card) 67'	Report	Saville (yellow card) 73'; Howson (yellow card) 90'	Stadium: Carrow Road; Attendance: 0 Referee: Keith Stroud

2 February 2021 27	Millwall	0–0	Norwich City	Bermondsey
18:00 GMT	Kieftenbeld (yellow card) 87'	Report	McLean (yellow card) 82'; Aarons (yellow card) 89'	Stadium: The Den; Attendance: 0 Referee: Steve Martin

5 February 2021 28	Swansea City	2–0	Norwich City	Swansea
20:15 GMT	Ayew 42'; Hourihane 48'; Bennett (yellow card) 64'; Guéhi (yellow card) 69'; Woodman (yellow card) 84'	Report	Idah (yellow card) 67'; Vrančić (yellow card) 78'	Stadium: Liberty Stadium; Attendance: 0 Referee: Simon Hooper

13 February 2021 29	Norwich City	4–1	Stoke City	Norwich
15:00 GMT	Cantwell 15'; Pukki 44', 79' (pen.); Buendía 64'	Report	Powell (yellow card) 42', (goal) 61'; Mikel (yellow card) 43'	Stadium: Carrow Road; Attendance: 0 Referee: Jeremy Simpson

17 February 2021 30	Coventry City	0–2	Norwich City	Birmingham
19:00 GMT	Dacosta (yellow card) 4'	Report	Hanley (yellow card) 17'; Pukki 28'; Buendía 45+1'; Gibson (yellow card) 70'; Cantwell (yellow card) 84'	Stadium: St Andrew's; Attendance: 0 Referee: Jarred Gillett

20 February 2021 31	Norwich City	1–0	Rotherham United	Norwich
15:00 GMT	Pukki 17'	Report	Ihiekwe (yellow card) 59'	Stadium: Carrow Road; Attendance: 0 Referee: Tony Harrington

23 February 2021 32	Birmingham City	1–3	Norwich City	Birmingham
19:00 GMT	Sánchez 38'; Hogan (yellow card) 68'; Clarke-Salter (yellow card) 84'	Report	Zimmermann (yellow card) 19'; Pukki 26', 76'; Vrančić (yellow card) 62'; Skipp 90+5'	Stadium: St Andrew's; Attendance: 0 Referee: Oliver Langford

28 February 2021 33	Wycombe Wanderers	0–2	Norwich City	High Wycombe
12:00 GMT	Wheeler (yellow card) 52'; Gape (yellow card) 57'; McCleary (yellow card) 60'	Report	Pukki 51'; Buendía (yellow card) 74'; Idah 87'	Stadium: Adams Park; Attendance: 0 Referee: Robert Jones

3 March 2021 34	Norwich City	1–0	Brentford	Norwich
17:30 GMT	Buendía 26'; Vrančić (yellow card) 51'; Hernández (yellow card) 71'	Report	Reid (yellow card) 41'	Stadium: Carrow Road; Attendance: 0 Referee: Tim Robinson

6 March 2021 35	Norwich City	3–0	Luton Town	Norwich
15:00 GMT	Pukki 12', 43'; Cantwell 73'	Report		Stadium: Carrow Road; Attendance: 0 Referee: David Webb

14 March 2021 36	Sheffield Wednesday	1–2	Norwich City	Sheffield
12:15 GMT	Rhodes 7'; Harris (yellow card) 45+4'; Bannan (yellow card) 71'	Report	Gibson (yellow card) 6'; McLean (yellow card) 40'; Pukki 61'; Cantwell 77'; Hugill (yellow card) 90+3'	Stadium: Hillsborough Stadium; Attendance: 0 Referee: Tony Harrington

17 March 2021 37	Nottingham Forest	0–2	Norwich City	West Bridgford
19:00 GMT		Report	Pukki 9'; Dowell 13'; Skipp (yellow card) 48'	Stadium: City Ground; Attendance: 0 Referee: Leigh Doughty

20 March 2021 38	Norwich City	1–1	Blackburn Rovers	Norwich
15:00 GMT	McLean 53'	Report	Gallagher 77'	Stadium: Carrow Road; Attendance: 0 Referee: Keith Stroud

2 April 2021 39	Preston North End	1–1	Norwich City	Preston
15:00 BST	Ledson (yellow card) 9'; Potts 90+5'	Report	Buendía 17'; Hernández (yellow card) 90+1'	Stadium: Deepdale; Attendance: 0 Referee: Dean Whitestone

6 April 2021 40	Norwich City	7–0	Huddersfield Town	Norwich
19:45 BST	Pukki 8', 20', 61' (pen.); Buendía 23'; Cantwell 29'; Dowell 42'; Hugill 78'	Report	Mbenza (yellow card) 60'	Stadium: Carrow Road; Attendance: 0 Referee: Jarred Gillett

10 April 2021 41	Derby County	0–1	Norwich City	Derby
15:00 BST	Shinnie (yellow card) 11'; Bird (yellow card) 15'; Forsyth (yellow card) 20'; Roberts (yellow card) 68'	Report	Dowell 21'	Stadium: Pride Park Stadium; Attendance: 0 Referee: Michael Salisbury

17 April 2021 42	Norwich City	1–3	Bournemouth	Norwich
20:00 BST	Buendía 5'; Giannoulis (red card) 17'; Krul (yellow card) 52'; McLean (yellow card) 58'; Skipp (yellow card) 90+1'	Report	Lerma (yellow card) 35'; Surridge 50'; Danjuma 57'; Smith (yellow card) 59'; Brooks (yellow card) 70'; Kelly 76'	Stadium: Carrow Road; Attendance: 0 Referee: Graham Scott

20 April 2021 43	Norwich City	0–1	Watford	Norwich
18:00 BST	Skipp (yellow card) 62'; McLean (yellow card) 73'; Hugill (yellow card) 90+6'	Report	Hughes (yellow card) 27'; Masina (yellow card) 49'; Gosling 57'; Cleverley (yellow card) 65'; Chalobah (yellow card) 90+8'	Stadium: Carrow Road; Attendance: 0 Referee: Tim Robinson

24 April 2021 44	Queens Park Rangers	1–3	Norwich City	White City
15:00 BST	Field (yellow card) 68'; Dykes 71'	Report	Quintillà 32'; Aarons 57'; Buendía 82'	Stadium: Loftus Road; Attendance: 0 Referee: James Linington

1 May 2021 45	Norwich City	4–1	Reading	Norwich
15:00 BST	Aarons (yellow card) 17'; Dowell 30', 64'; Skipp (yellow card) 42'; Quintillà 78'; Pukki 85'	Report	Laurent 12'; Richards (yellow card) 25'; Semedo (yellow card) 77'	Stadium: Carrow Road; Attendance: 0 Referee: Oliver Langford

8 May 2021 46	Barnsley	2–2	Norwich City	Barnsley
12:30 BST	Chaplin (yellow card) 17', (goal) 43'; Woodrow 24'; Palmer (yellow card) 63'; Sibbick (yellow card) 66'	Report	Buendía 26', (yellow card) 90'; Idah 54'	Stadium: Oakwell; Attendance: 0 Referee: Josh Smith

=== FA Cup ===
The third round draw was made on 30 November, with Premier League and EFL Championship clubs all entering the competition. The fourth and fifth rounds draws were made consecutively on 11 January.

9 January 2021 Third round	Norwich City	2–0	Coventry City	Norwich
12:00 GMT	McLean 6', (yellow card) 53'; Hugill 7'; Cantwell (yellow card) 66'; Hanley (yellow card) 87'	Report	Hamer (yellow card) 63'	Stadium: Carrow Road; Attendance: 0 Referee: Darren Drysdale

23 January 2021 Fourth round	Barnsley	1–0	Norwich City	Barnsley
15:00 GMT	Styles 56'	Report		Stadium: Oakwell; Attendance: 0 Referee: John Brooks

=== EFL Cup ===
The first round draw was made on 18 August, live on Sky Sports, by Paul Merson.

5 September 2020 First round	Luton Town	3–1	Norwich City	Luton
15:00 BST	Collins 79' (pen.), 83', 90+5'; Rea (yellow card) 90+4'	Report	McCallum (yellow card) 70'; Dowell 81'	Stadium: Kenilworth Road; Attendance: 0 Referee: John Busby

== Statistics ==
=== Appearances, goals and cards ===
No.	Pos	Player	Championship			FA Cup			EFL Cup			Total			Discipline	
No.	Pos	Player	Starts	Sub	Goals	Starts	Sub	Goals	Starts	Sub	Goals	Starts	Sub	Goals	Yellow card	Red card
1	GK	(Netherlands) Tim Krul	36	0	0	1	0	0	—	—	—	37	0	0	2	0
2	DF	(England) Max Aarons	45	0	2	1	1	0	—	—	—	46	1	2	5	0
3	DF	(England) Sam Byram	—	—	—	—	—	—	—	—	—	0	0	0	0	0
5	DF	(Scotland) Grant Hanley	42	0	1	1	1	0	—	—	—	43	1	1	4	0
6	DF	(Germany) Christoph Zimmermann	13	9	0	1	0	0	1	0	0	15	9	0	4	0
7	MF	(Germany) Lukas Rupp	15	8	0	1	0	0	1	0	0	17	8	0	2	0
8	MF	(Bosnia and Herzegovina) Mario Vrančić	19	13	3	0	1	0	0	1	0	19	15	3	3	0
9	ST	(England) Jordan Hugill	7	24	4	2	0	1	1	0	0	10	24	5	2	0
10	MF	(England) Kieran Dowell	12	12	5	1	0	0	1	0	1	14	12	6	1	0
11	MF	(Poland) Przemysław Płacheta	10	16	1	2	0	0	—	—	—	12	16	1	1	0
12	GK	(Norway) Ørjan Nyland	—	—	—	—	—	—	—	—	—	0	0	0	0	0
14	MF	(England) Todd Cantwell	30	3	6	1	0	0	—	—	—	31	3	6	5	0
16	DF	(Spain) Xavi Quintillà	11	0	2	1	0	0	—	—	—	12	0	2	1	0
17	MF	(Argentina) Emi Buendía	39	0	15	0	2	0	—	—	—	39	2	15	6	2
18	MF	(Germany) Marco Stiepermann	12	6	1	—	—	—	1	0	0	13	6	1	1	0
19	MF	(Denmark) Jacob Sørensen	20	12	1	2	0	0	—	—	—	22	12	1	3	0
20	MF	(England) Oliver Skipp	44	1	1	0	2	0	—	—	—	44	3	1	7	0
22	ST	(Finland) Teemu Pukki	39	2	26	0	1	0	—	—	—	39	3	26	1	0
23	MF	(Scotland) Kenny McLean	30	8	2	1	0	1	—	—	—	31	8	3	7	0
24	ST	(England) Josh Martin	6	3	1	0	1	0	1	0	0	7	4	1	0	0
25	MF	(Cuba) Onel Hernández	6	15	0	1	0	0	0	1	0	7	16	0	2	0
26	DF	(England) Bali Mumba	1	3	0	1	0	0	1	0	0	3	3	0	0	0
27	MF	(Norway) Alexander Tettey	5	14	0	2	0	0	1	0	0	8	14	0	0	0
28	MF	(France) Melvin Sitti	—	—	—	—	—	—	0	1	0	0	1	0	0	0
30	DF	(Greece) Dimitris Giannoulis	16	0	0	—	—	—	—	—	—	16	0	0	0	1
33	GK	(Northern Ireland) Michael McGovern	9	1	0	—	—	—	—	—	—	9	1	0	0	0
34	DF	(England) Ben Gibson	26	1	0	2	0	0	—	—	—	28	1	0	5	0
35	ST	(Republic of Ireland) Adam Idah	1	16	3	—	—	—	—	—	—	1	16	3	3	1
38	GK	(England) Aston Oxborough	—	—	—	—	—	—	—	—	—	0	0	0	0	0
42	MF	(Scotland) Reece McAlear	0	1	0	—	—	—	—	—	—	0	1	0	0	0
44	DF	(Republic of Ireland) Andrew Omobamidele	8	1	0	—	—	—	—	—	—	8	1	0	0	0
50	GK	(Wales) Daniel Barden	1	1	0	1	0	0	1	0	0	3	1	0	0	0
52	GK	(Scotland) Jon McCracken	—	—	—	—	—	—	—	—	—	0	0	0	0	0
57	MF	(Scotland) Tom Dickson-Peters	—	—	—	—	—	—	—	—	—	0	0	0	0	0
—	MF	(Germany) Moritz Leitner	—	—	—	—	—	—	—	—	—	0	0	0	0	0
—	ST	(United States) Sebastian Soto	—	—	—	—	—	—	—	—	—	0	0	0	0	0
Players out on loan:
15	DF	(Switzerland) Timm Klose	—	—	—	—	—	—	1	0	0	1	0	0	0	0
21	MF	(Luxembourg) Danel Sinani	—	—	—	—	—	—	—	—	—	0	0	0	0	0
31	DF	(England) Sam McCallum	—	—	—	—	—	—	1	0	0	1	0	0	1	0
43	DF	(England) Akin Famewo	—	—	—	—	—	—	—	—	—	0	0	0	0	0
48	MF	(Republic of Ireland) William Hondermarck	—	—	—	—	—	—	—	—	—	0	0	0	0	0
53	ST	(Belgium) Tyrese Omotoye	0	3	0	0	1	0	—	—	—	0	4	0	0	0
—	DF	(Germany) Philip Heise	—	—	—	—	—	—	—	—	—	0	0	0	0	0
—	MF	(Wales) Louis Thompson	—	—	—	—	—	—	—	—	—	0	0	0	0	0
—	MF	(Germany) Tom Trybull	—	—	—	—	—	—	—	—	—	0	0	0	0	0
—	ST	(Switzerland) Josip Drmić	—	—	—	—	—	—	—	—	—	0	0	0	0	0
Players no longer at the club:
4	MF	(England) Ben Godfrey	3	0	0	—	—	—	—	—	—	3	0	0	0	0
12	DF	(Northern Ireland) Jamal Lewis	—	—	—	—	—	—	—	—	—	0	0	0	0	0
—	ST	(England) Carlton Morris	—	—	—	—	—	—	—	—	—	0	0	0	0	0

=== Goalscorers ===
Rank	Pos.	Player	Championship	FA Cup	EFL Cup	Total
1	ST	Teemu Pukki	26	0	0	26
2	MF	Emi Buendía	15	0	0	15
3	MF	Todd Cantwell	6	0	0	6
3	MF	Kieran Dowell	5	0	1	6
5	ST	Jordan Hugill	4	1	0	5
6	MF	Mario Vrančić	3	0	0	3
6	ST	Adam Idah	3	0	0	3
6	MF	Kenny McLean	2	1	0	3
9	DF	Max Aarons	2	0	0	2
9	DF	Xavi Quintillà	2	0	0	2
11	MF	Przemysław Płacheta	1	0	0	1
11	MF	Marco Stiepermann	1	0	0	1
11	ST	Josh Martin	1	0	0	1
11	MF	Jacob Sørensen	1	0	0	1
11	DF	Grant Hanley	1	0	0	1
11	MF	Oliver Skipp	1	0	0	1
Own goals			1	0	0	1
Totals			75	2	1	78
