= Lasme =

Lasme is a surname. Notable people with the surname include:

- Bryan Lasme (born 1998), French footballer
- Stéphane Lasme (born 1982), Gabonese basketball player
