= Ayessa =

Ayessa is a Congolese surname. Notable people with the surname include:

- Firmin Ayessa (born 1951), Congolese politician
- Jésah Ayessa (born 2002), French footballer
