= Chris Bedia =

Ivorian footballer (born 1996)

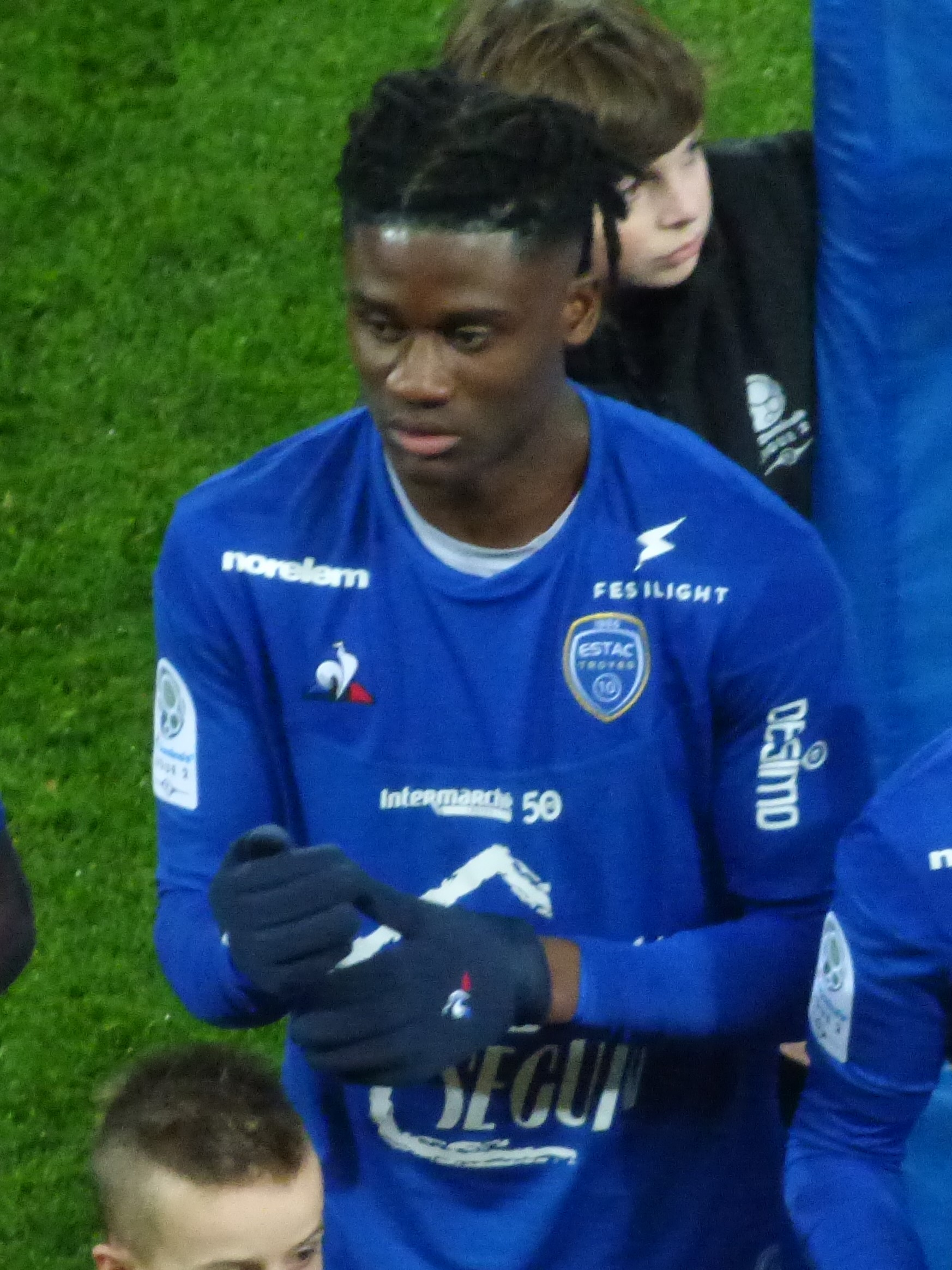
- Bedia with Troyes in 2020

Personal information
- Full name: Chris Vianney Ryan Bilé Bedia
- Date of birth: 5 March 1996 (age 30)
- Place of birth: Abidjan, Ivory Coast
- Height: 1.90 m (6 ft 3 in)
- Position: Forward

Team information
- Current team: Al-Nasr

Youth career
- -2013: Tours

Senior career*
| Years | Team | Apps | (Gls) |
| 2013–2016 | Tours B | 39 | (16) |
| 2014–2016 | Tours | 20 | (5) |
| 2016–2022 | Charleroi | 80 | (7) |
| 2018–2019 | → Zulte Waregem (loan) | 16 | (0) |
| 2019–2020 | → Troyes (loan) | 22 | (3) |
| 2020–2021 | → Sochaux (loan) | 35 | (9) |
| 2022–2024 | Servette | 54 | (25) |
| 2024–2026 | Union Berlin | 7 | (1) |
| 2024–2025 | → Hull City (loan) | 21 | (3) |
| 2025–2026 | → Young Boys (loan) | 53 | (23) |
| 2026– | Al-Nasr | 0 | (0) |

International career
| 2015 | Ivory Coast U20 | 3 | (2) |
- * Club domestic league appearances and goals as of 18:30, 17 May 2026 (UTC)

Chris Vianney Ryan Bilé Bedia (born 5 March 1996) is an Ivorian professional footballer who plays as a forward for UAE Pro League club Al-Nasr. He represented the Ivory Coast under-20s in the 2015 Toulon Tournament.

== Club career ==
=== Tours ===
Bedia started his career at the age of 18 with Tours FC in Ligue 2. Despite scoring a brace against Brest, he was unable to establish himself and thus transferred to Sporting Charleroi.

=== Sporting Charleroi ===
After his move to Belgium, Bedia had a strong first season but was subsequently rarely utilized. As a result, he was initially loaned to S.V. Zulte Waregem. However, in 17 games, he failed to score a single goal and returned to Charleroi. Despite being used more frequently after a change in coaching staff, the club loaned him to ES Troyes AC on 14 August 2019. Even there, the purchase option was not exercised, and Bedia returned once again to Charleroi.

He was loaned out again, this time to Sochaux. Having played a strong season there, Montpellier HSC expressed interest in signing the striker.

=== Servette ===
On 24 January 2022, Bedia signed with Servette in the Swiss Super League.

=== Union Berlin ===
On 18 January 2024, Bedia moved to Union Berlin in Germany.

=== Hull City ===
On 22 August 2024, Bedia joined EFL Championship club Hull City on a season-long loan deal with an option to buy. Two days later, on 24 August 2024, he came off the bench to make his debut, a 0–0 home draw with Millwall. On 28 September 2024, he scored a penalty in the 4–1 home win against Cardiff City. On 1 February 2025, Bedia was recalled by Union Berlin.

=== Young Boys ===
On 2 February 2025, Bedia joined Young Boys in Switzerland on loan until the summer of 2026.

=== Al-Nasr ===
On 17 July 2026, Bedia transferred to Al-Nasr in the United Arab Emirates.

== Career statistics ==
As of match played 17 May 2026

Appearances and goals by club, season and competition
| Club | Season | League | | | National cup (Note: Includes Belgian Cup, Coupe de France, Swiss Cup) | | Europe | | Total | |
| Club | Season | Division | Apps | Goals | Apps | Goals | Apps | Goals | Apps | Goals |
|---|---|---|---|---|---|---|---|---|---|---|
| Tours | 2014–15 | Ligue 2 | 9 | 1 | 0 | 0 | — | | 9 | 1 |
| Tours | 2015–16 | Ligue 2 | 11 | 4 | 0 | 0 | — | | 11 | 4 |
| Tours | Total | | 20 | 5 | 0 | 0 | — | | 20 | 5 |
| Charleroi | 2016–17 | Belgian Pro League | 35 | 5 | 3 | 1 | — | | 38 | 6 |
| Charleroi | 2017–18 | Belgian Pro League | 31 | 1 | 1 | 1 | — | | 32 | 2 |
| Charleroi | 2018–19 | Belgian Pro League | 2 | 0 | — | | — | | 2 | 0 |
| Charleroi | 2019–20 | Belgian Pro League | 3 | 0 | 0 | 0 | — | | 3 | 0 |
| Charleroi | 2021–22 | Belgian Pro League | 9 | 1 | 1 | 0 | — | | 10 | 1 |
| Charleroi | Total | | 80 | 7 | 5 | 2 | — | | 85 | 9 |
| Zulte Waregem (loan) | 2018–19 | Belgian Pro League | 16 | 0 | 1 | 0 | — | | 17 | 0 |
| Troyes (loan) | 2019–20 | Ligue 2 | 22 | 3 | 1 | 0 | — | | 23 | 3 |
| Sochaux (loan) | 2020–21 | Ligue 2 | 35 | 9 | 3 | 3 | — | | 38 | 12 |
| Servette | 2021–22 | Swiss Super League | 14 | 3 | — | | — | | 14 | 3 |
| Servette | 2022–23 | Swiss Super League | 23 | 12 | 2 | 0 | — | | 25 | 12 |
| Servette | 2023–24 | Swiss Super League | 17 | 10 | 2 | 2 | 10 (Note: Four appearances and two goals in UEFA Champions League, six appearances and two goals in UEFA Europa League) | 4 | 29 | 16 |
| Servette | Total | | 54 | 25 | 4 | 2 | 10 | 4 | 68 | 31 |
| Union Berlin | 2023–24 | Bundesliga | 7 | 1 | — | | — | | 7 | 1 |
| Union Berlin | 2026–27 | Bundesliga | 0 | 0 | 0 | 0 | — | | 0 | 0 |
| Union Berlin | Total | | 7 | 1 | 0 | 0 | — | | 7 | 1 |
| Hull City (loan) | 2024–25 | Championship | 21 | 3 | 0 | 0 | — | | 21 | 3 |
| Young Boys (loan) | 2024–25 | Swiss Super League | 17 | 6 | 2 | 0 | — | | 19 | 6 |
| Young Boys (loan) | 2025–26 | Swiss Super League | 36 | 17 | 2 | 1 | 10 (Note: Appearances in UEFA Europa League) | 2 | 48 | 20 |
| Young Boys (loan) | Total | | 53 | 23 | 4 | 1 | 10 | 2 | 66 | 26 |
| Career total | | | 308 | 76 | 18 | 8 | 20 | 6 | 346 | 90 |
