= Tim Krul =

Dutch footballer (born 1988)

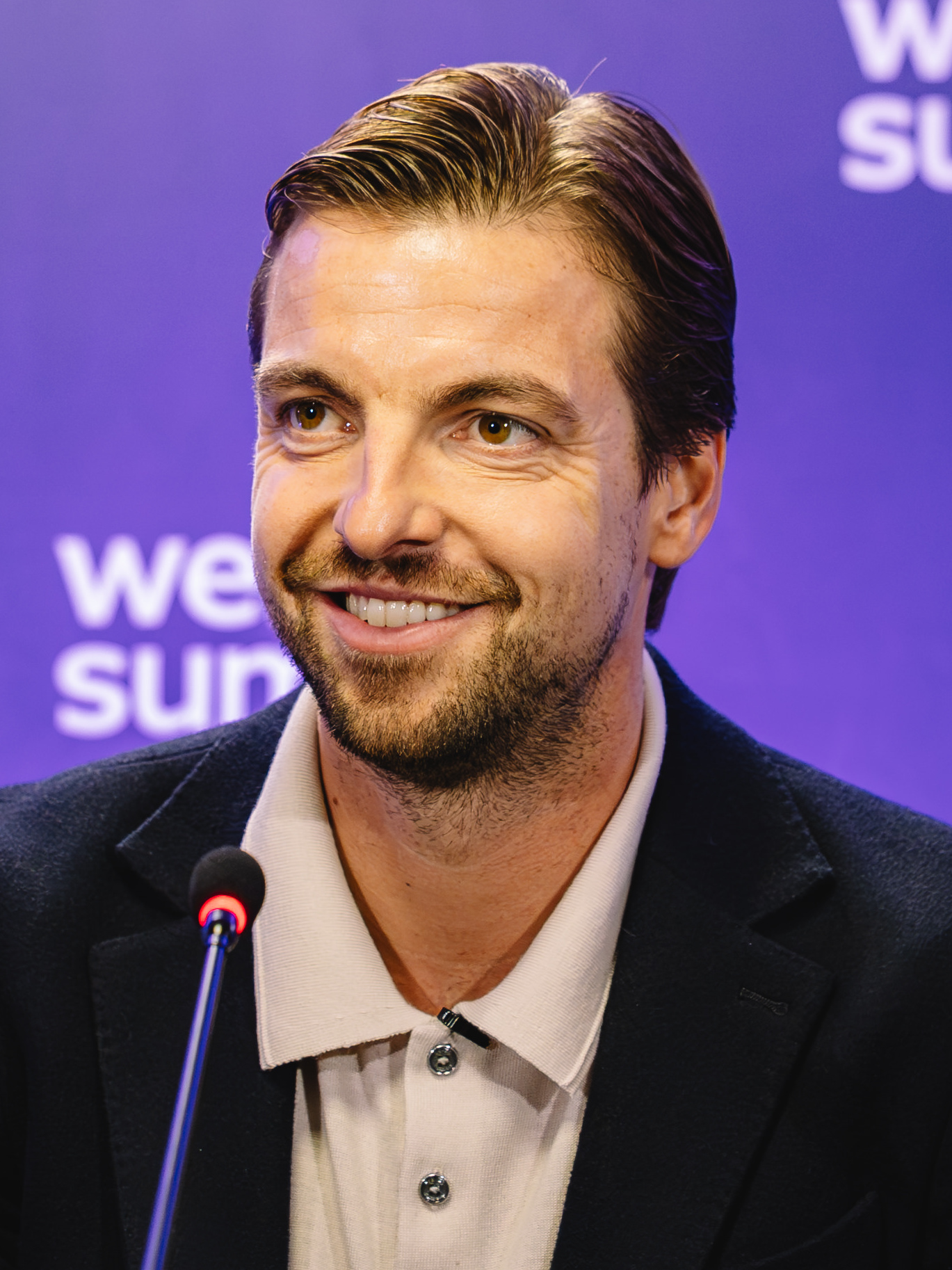
- Krul in 2025

Personal information
- Full name: Timothy Michael Krul
- Date of birth: 3 April 1988 (age 38)
- Place of birth: The Hague, Netherlands
- Height: 1.93 m (6 ft 4 in)
- Position: Goalkeeper

Youth career
- Hvv RAS
- 1996–2005: ADO Den Haag
- 2005–2006: Newcastle United

Senior career*
Years	Team	Apps	(Gls)
2006–2017	Newcastle United	160	(0)
2007–2008	→ Falkirk (loan)	22	(0)
2008–2009	→ Carlisle United (loan)	9	(0)
2016–2017	→ Ajax (loan)	0	(0)
2016–2017	→ Jong Ajax (loan)	6	(0)
2017	→ AZ (loan)	16	(0)
2017	→ Brighton & Hove Albion (loan)	0	(0)
2017–2018	Brighton & Hove Albion	0	(0)
2018–2023	Norwich City	163	(0)
2023–2025	Luton Town	6	(0)
Total		376	(0)

International career
2002	Netherlands U15	1	(0)
2004	Netherlands U16	1	(0)
2004–2005	Netherlands U17	19	(0)
2006–2007	Netherlands U19	6	(0)
2008–2009	Netherlands U20	4	(0)
2009–2011	Netherlands U21	12	(0)
2011–2022	Netherlands	15	(0)
Medal record
Men's football
Representing Netherlands
FIFA World Cup
Third place	2014
UEFA European Under-21 Championship
Winner	2007
FIFA U-17 World Cup
Third place	2005
UEFA European Under-17 Championship
Runner-up	2005
- * Club domestic league appearances and goals

Timothy Michael Krul (Dutch pronunciation: [ˈkrʏl]; born 3 April 1988) is a Dutch former professional footballer who played as a goalkeeper.

Krul's career began at youth clubs RAS and ADO Den Haag before moving to Newcastle United in 2005. At Newcastle, he made his debut in the UEFA Cup, securing a clean sheet in his first game. He signed a new four-year contract with Newcastle in 2007 and had loan spells at Falkirk and Carlisle United. His return to Newcastle saw him rise from backup to first-choice goalkeeper. He won awards and received a new contract. He had loans to Ajax and AZ Alkmaar in the Netherlands, providing him with first-team football as he recovered from injury. In 2017, Krul joined Brighton & Hove Albion on loan before signing permanently. His career continued at Norwich City, where he was named the club's Player of the Season and won the EFL Championship twice. In 2023, he moved to newly-promoted Premier League side Luton Town, where he played with the club for two seasons before retiring from football.

Krul represented the Netherlands at every level from 2002. He made his debut for the full national team in July 2011 and was part of the team that came third at the 2014 FIFA World Cup, playing in the quarter-final penalty shoot-out win against Costa Rica.

== Club career ==
=== Newcastle United ===
Krul began his career at hometown club RAS and later local Eredivisie club ADO Den Haag. He joined Premier League club Newcastle United in the summer of 2005 on a three-year deal after failing to sign professional terms. ADO demanded a compensation fee and objected to the FIFA Dispute Resolution Chamber (DRC). The DRC denied the claim and ADO took the case to the Court of Arbitration for Sport (CAS). CAS ruled in February 2007 in favour of ADO, ordering Newcastle to pay €220,000 as compensation for the transfer.

Following an injury to Newcastle's first-choice goalkeeper Shay Given, Krul appeared on the bench as back-up to second-choice Steve Harper. Krul made his Newcastle debut in the UEFA Cup on 2 November 2006 against Palermo. His debut was well-received; he displayed his shot-stopping abilities, saving efforts from Giuseppe Biava and David Di Michele and recording a clean sheet in the process.

He was injured during the warm-up prior to the second leg tie against Palermo and then aggravated that injury in the warm-up before a game against Watford. He required two cartilage operations as a result, keeping him out of action for almost six months. He returned to action in April 2007.

On 13 June 2007, he signed a new four-year contract with Newcastle. In the same month, he was part of the Dutch Under-21 squad that won the European Championships and also qualified for the 2008 Summer Olympics.

==== Falkirk (loan) ====
On 3 August 2007, Krul joined Scottish side Falkirk on loan, originally until 1 January 2008 though it was later extended until the end of the season after a number of impressive performances. The following day he made his debut for Falkirk and kept a clean sheet as the team won 4–0 against Gretna. Falkirk initially wanted to sign him on a permanent deal but it was refused by Newcastle.

In the two games immediately following his debut, he conceded four goals against Celtic and seven goals against Rangers at Ibrox. Krul was sent off for the first time in his professional career on 2 January 2008 after reacting badly to an opponent's challenge. Shortly afterwards, he suffered a dislocated shoulder during a Scottish Cup defeat against Aberdeen and missed the rest of the season.

==== Carlisle United (loan) ====
On 21 November 2008, Krul joined Carlisle United on a one-month loan from Newcastle to replace Ben Alnwick, who had rejoined Tottenham Hotspur. The loan deal was extended for a further month in December with Krul returning to Newcastle in January.

=== Return to Newcastle ===
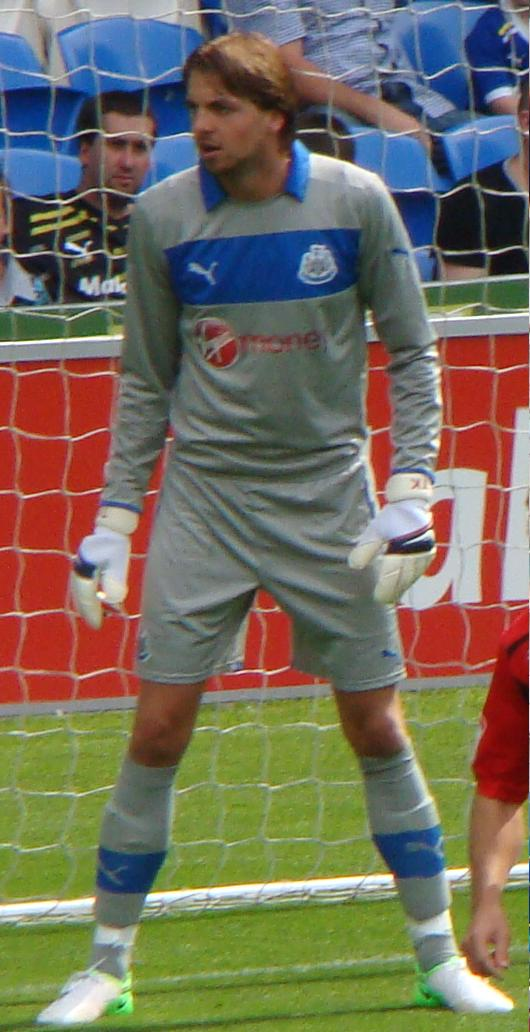
Krul playing for Newcastle United in 2012

Krul returned to Newcastle as backup to first choice Steve Harper. He made his senior league debut on 8 August 2009 in the opening Football League Championship game of the season away to West Bromwich Albion, coming on as a half time substitute for the injured Harper. Following this match, The Guardian called him "an excellent reserve goalkeeper". He later played the full Football League Cup match against Huddersfield Town on 26 August 2009, which Newcastle won 4–3. Krul also started the 2–0 League Cup defeat to Peterborough. Against Swansea City on 28 November, he again came on to replace the injured Steve Harper. On 2 January, he played in the FA Cup Third Round tie against Plymouth Argyle, the game ending 0–0. He then played in the replay at St James' Park on 13 January, a 3–0 victory. Krul started his first league game for Newcastle on 2 May 2010, the last day of the Championship campaign, against Queens Park Rangers at Loftus Road and kept a clean sheet. In July 2010, Krul signed a new four-year contract with Newcastle.

Krul made his Premier League debut for Newcastle on 18 September 2010 against Everton at Goodison Park, coming on as a substitute in the 35th minute for the injured Steve Harper in a match that ended in a 1–0 win for the Magpies. He made his first Premier League start on 26 September against Stoke City at St James' Park. He then played against Manchester City in a 2–1 loss, Wigan Athletic in a 2–2 draw and in the 2–1 away win to West Ham United, before starting in his first Tyne-Wear derby, Newcastle winning 5–1, and a 1–0 away win at Arsenal a week later.

Following his good performances, Alan Pardew gave him more chances. He eventually became first choice and Harper was sent on loan to Brighton & Hove Albion. He started the 2011–12 season well, keeping clean sheets in the first two matches of the season against Arsenal and Sunderland. On 3 December 2011, Krul made his 50th Newcastle appearance against Chelsea. He saved a Frank Lampard penalty and made several other impressive saves, although Newcastle went on to lose the game 3–0. On 3 March 2012, Krul signed a new five-year contract at Newcastle United. Krul then went on to play in the away game against Arsenal, which Newcastle lost 2–1. During the match, fellow Dutchman Robin van Persie accused Krul of wasting time throughout the match and taunted Krul after the match had ended. The row continued into the tunnel and the two players had to be separated. Although he received criticism from Arsenal player Jack Wilshere, teammate James Perch defended Krul, believing van Persie "out of order". At the end of the season, Krul received Toon Talk's Newcastle United Player of the Year award.

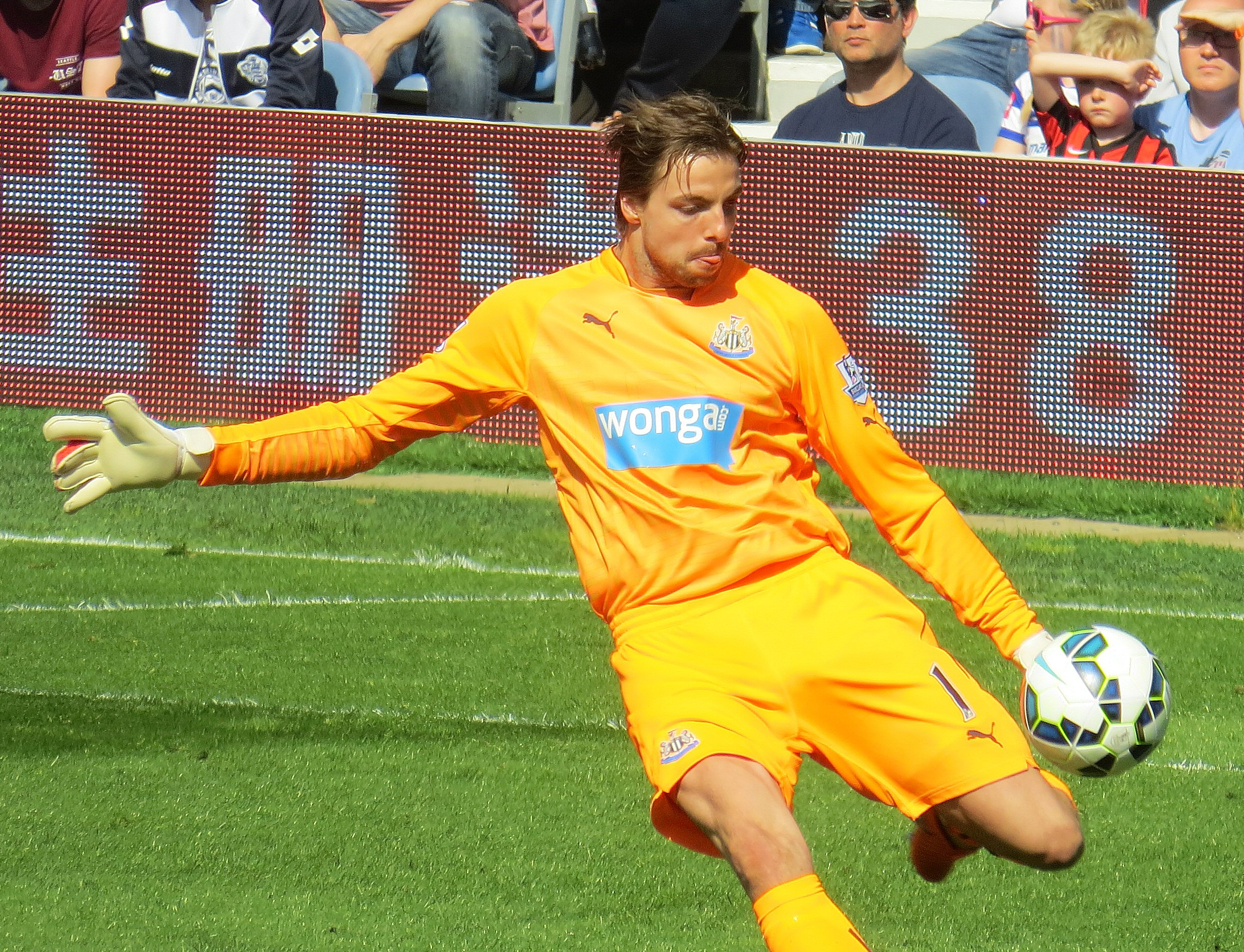
Krul playing for Newcastle United in 2015

In the summer before the 2012–13 Premier League, Krul was given the number 1 jersey, with Steve Harper receiving number 37. Krul started the first three matches of the season before suffering an elbow injury whilst on international duty. After seven weeks off, Krul returned to training. Krul made his return in the Tyne–Wear derby on 21 October 2012, a 1–1 draw. He injured his ankle during a Europa League match in the Round of 32 against Ukrainian side Metalist Kharkiv which ruled him out for five weeks. In the Tyne–Wear derby on 14 April 2013, Krul suffered a dislocated shoulder on 57th minutes after he landed awkwardly after punching away an Adam Johnson free-kick. After surgery on his dislocated shoulder, Krul was ruled out for the rest of the 2012–13 season.

Ahead of the 2013–14 season, Krul made his first appearance since his ankle injury in a friendly match against Rangers. In November, Krul made some impressive displays, conceding just two goals and keeping clean sheets against Tottenham, where he made a total of 14 saves during the match), and Chelsea. His impressive displays earned him November's Premier League Player of the Month. Krul's performance was praised by Newcastle United goalkeeping legend Pavel Srníček and manager Alan Pardew.

Krul sustained an ankle injury in training before Newcastle's match with West Ham United and was ruled out for up to six weeks with the injury. Krul returned in his side's 2–0 defeat to Chelsea.

==== Return to the Netherlands ====
On 25 August 2016, Krul signed a one-year contract extension at Newcastle United before joining Ajax on a season-long loan deal to provide him with top-tier first-team football as he continued his recovery from injury. That deal was cut short, Krul only playing six games for the club's reserve side, and, in January 2017, he joined fellow Eredivisie side AZ Alkmaar on loan for the rest of the season.

=== Brighton & Hove Albion ===
On 31 August 2017, Krul signed for Premier League club Brighton & Hove Albion on a season-long loan, reuniting him with former Newcastle manager Chris Hughton. On 19 September, he made his debut for the club in an EFL Cup third round tie against AFC Bournemouth. The following day, he signed a permanent deal with Brighton, ending his twelve-year association with Newcastle. At the end of the season, Krul left the club.

=== Norwich City ===
Krul signed for Championship club Norwich City on 24 July 2018 on a two-year contract. He signed a new three-year contract in June 2019. Krul was named Norwich City's Player of the Season in the club's 2019–20 campaign, making him only the fifth ever different goalkeeper to win the Barry Butler memorial trophy.

Krul remained Norwich's starting keeper for the 2020–21 season. He would suffer a hamstring injury in November in a game against Stoke City, being replaced by Michael McGovern. He proceeded to miss a number of games between then and the end of January, with McGovern or Daniel Barden deputising, but eventually regained his place as Norwich won the Championship and promotion back to the Premier League.

Krul was once again the first choice goalkeeper for the 2021–22 season but Norwich now had Angus Gunn as an alternative. After a run of poor results, Krul was absent from two games in December with Gunn played instead. Krul would regain his place for the next two games, only to suffer a late injury in a game against Everton. He would be out of the side until March, retaining his place as Norwich were relegated back to the Championship at the first attempt.

The following season would again see Krul start as first choice but his days as Norwich's No.1 were drawing to an end. Following a 3–2 home defeat by Preston North End, Krul was replaced by Gunn in the starting line-up. He was restored to the side by new manager David Wagner for his first game in charge, ironically against Preston, with Norwich winning the game 4–0. This was to be short-lived however, and Krul made his final appearance for Norwich two games later, in a 3–0 defeat to Burnley.

=== Luton Town and retirement ===
On 17 August 2023, Krul signed for newly promoted Premier League club Luton Town with an undisclosed contract length. On 9 May 2025, the club announced Krul would be released in June when his contract expired.

On 23 September 2025, Krul announced his retirement from professional football at the age of 37.

== International career ==
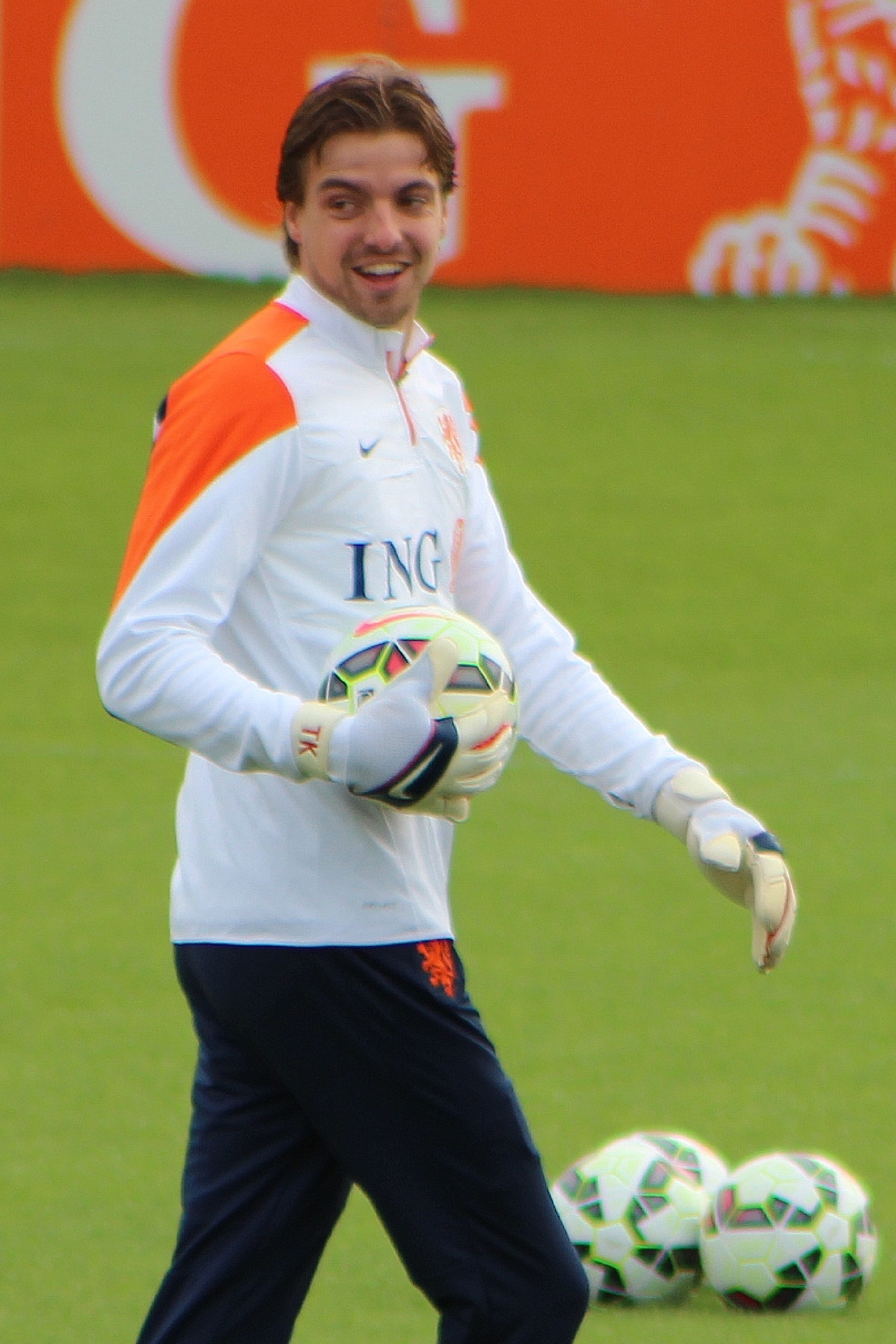
Krul training with the Netherlands in 2014

Krul represented the Netherlands national team at U17 level at the 2005 FIFA U-17 World Cup in Peru. He represented the U21s at the 2008 Toulon Tournament and was a regular in the side for the 2011 European Under-21 Championship qualifying campaign.

On 4 June 2011, Krul made the starting eleven for the Netherlands in a friendly against Brazil, his first cap at senior level. He went on to keep a clean sheet, pulling off a string of decent saves in a 0–0 draw. He played his second match for the international team four days later against Uruguay in a 3–4 penalty shoot-out loss, the match having finished 1–1 after 90 minutes. He was called up to the Netherlands UEFA Euro 2012 squad but did not make any appearances. In new coach Louis van Gaal's first competitive game in charge against Turkey in Amsterdam, Krul was selected as starting goalkeeper, keeping a clean sheet in a 2–0 win for the Oranje.

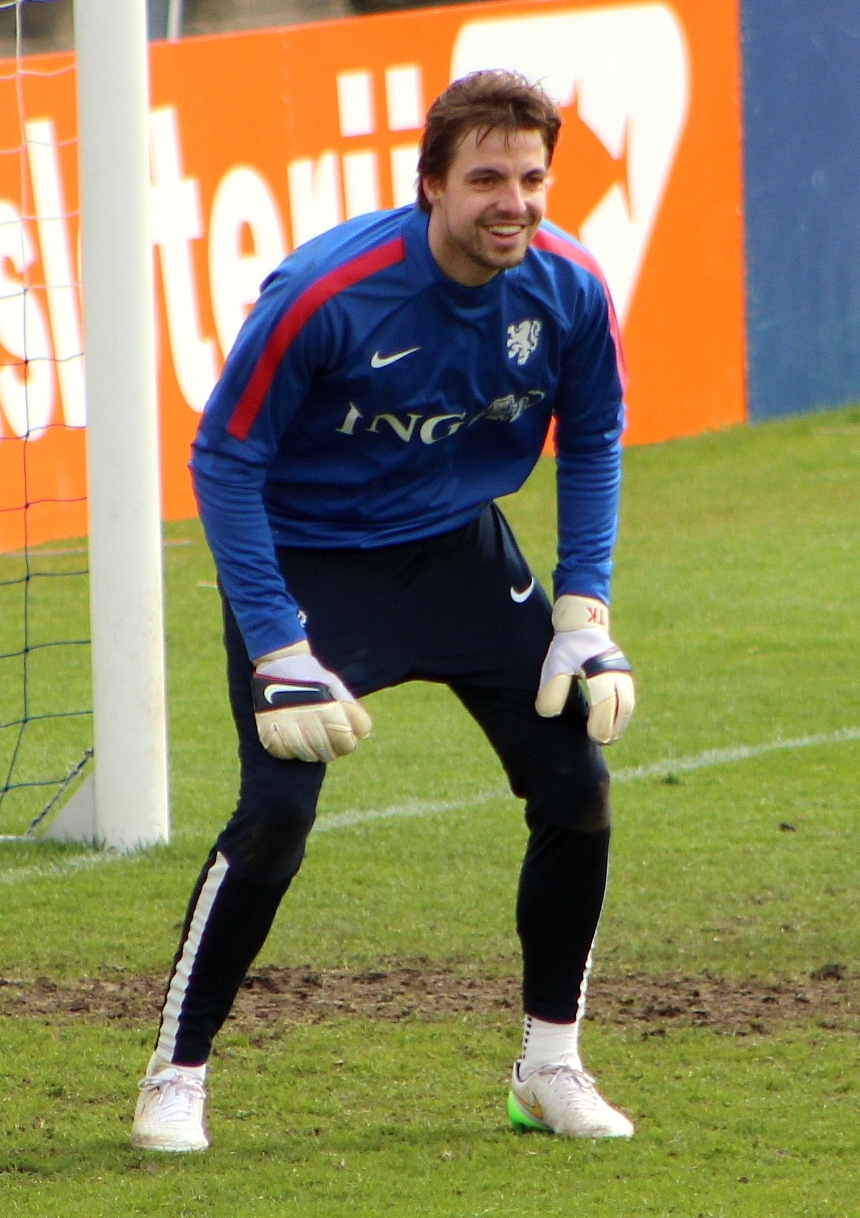
Krul training with the Netherlands national team in 2015.

In June 2014, Krul was included in the Netherlands' squad for the 2014 FIFA World Cup in Brazil. In the quarter-final against Costa Rica, he was brought on by Louis van Gaal as a 120th-minute substitute for the penalty shootout. He saved two of the five penalties he faced as the Netherlands won 4–3. This was the first time in the history of the World Cup that a goalkeeper was sent on as a substitute solely for a penalty shoot-out.

== Personal life ==
In September 2025, he graduated in the inaugural cohort of students from the PFA Business School, with an award from the University of Portsmouth.

== Career statistics ==
=== Club ===
Appearances and goals by club, season and competition
Club	Season	League			National cup (Note: Includes FA Cup, Scottish Cup, KNVB Cup)		League cup (Note: Includes EFL Cup, Scottish League Cup)		Europe		Other		Total	
Club	Season	Division	Apps	Goals	Apps	Goals	Apps	Goals	Apps	Goals	Apps	Goals	Apps	Goals
Newcastle United	2006–07	Premier League	0	0	0	0	0	0	1 (Note: Appearance in UEFA Cup)	0	—		1	0
Newcastle United	2008–09	Premier League	0	0	—		—		—		—		0	0
Newcastle United	2009–10	Championship	3	0	3	0	2	0	—		—		8	0
Newcastle United	2010–11	Premier League	21	0	1	0	3	0	—		—		25	0
Newcastle United	2011–12	Premier League	38	0	2	0	2	0	—		—		42	0
Newcastle United	2012–13	Premier League	24	0	0	0	0	0	6 (Note: Appearances in UEFA Europa League)	0	—		30	0
Newcastle United	2013–14	Premier League	36	0	0	0	2	0	—		—		38	0
Newcastle United	2014–15	Premier League	30	0	0	0	1	0	—		—		31	0
Newcastle United	2015–16	Premier League	8	0	0	0	1	0	—		—		9	0
Newcastle United	Total		160	0	6	0	11	0	7	0	—		184	0
Falkirk (loan)	2007–08	Scottish Premier League	22	0	2	0	2	0	—		—		26	0
Carlisle United (loan)	2008–09	League One	9	0	0	0	—		—		—		9	0
Jong Ajax (loan)	2016–17	Eerste Divisie	6	0	—		—		—		—		6	0
AZ (loan)	2016–17	Eredivisie	16	0	2	0	—		2	0	4 (Note: Appearances in Eredivisie European play-offs)	0	24	0
Brighton & Hove Albion	2017–18	Premier League	0	0	4	0	1	0	—		—		5	0
Brighton & Hove Albion U21	2017–18	—			—		—		—		1 (Note: Appearance in EFL Trophy)	0	1	0
Norwich City	2018–19	Championship	46	0	0	0	0	0	—		—		46	0
Norwich City	2019–20	Premier League	36	0	2	0	0	0	—		—		38	0
Norwich City	2020–21	Championship	36	0	1	0	0	0	—		—		37	0
Norwich City	2021–22	Premier League	29	0	2	0	0	0	—		—		31	0
Norwich City	2022–23	Championship	16	0	1	0	0	0	—		—		17	0
Norwich City	2023–24	Championship	0	0	0	0	0	0	—		—		0	0
Norwich City	Total		163	0	6	0	0	0	—		—		169	0
Luton Town	2023–24	Premier League	0	0	4	0	2	0	—		—		6	0
Luton Town	2024–25	Championship	0	0	0	0	0	0	—		—		0	0
Luton Town	Total		0	0	4	0	2	0	—		—		6	0
Career total			376	0	24	0	16	0	9	0	5	0	430	0

=== International ===
Appearances and goals by national team and year
National team	Year	Apps	Goals
Netherlands	2011	2	0
Netherlands	2012	2	0
Netherlands	2013	1	0
Netherlands	2014	2	0
Netherlands	2015	1	0
Netherlands	2020	3	0
Netherlands	2021	4	0
Netherlands	2022	0	0
Total		15	0

== Honours ==
Norwich City

- EFL Championship: 2018–19, 2020–21

Netherlands U17

- UEFA European Under-17 Championship runner-up: 2005
- FIFA U-17 World Championship third place: 2005

Netherlands U21

- UEFA European Under-21 Championship: 2007

Netherlands

- FIFA World Cup third place: 2014

Individual

- Newcastle United Player of the Year: 2011–12
- Premier League Player of the Month: November 2013
- Norwich City Player of the Season: 2019–20
- PFA Team of the Year: 2020–21 Championship
