= Abdelmalek Amara =

Footballer (born 2000)

Personal information
- Date of birth: 10 March 2000 (age 26)
- Place of birth: Rouen, France
- Height: 1.73 m (5 ft 8 in)
- Position: Forward

Team information
- Current team: Paris 13 Atletico
- Number: 10

Youth career
- –2018: Le Havre AC
- 2019: SC Bastia

Senior career*
Years	Team	Apps	(Gls)
2019–2020	MC Oran	2	(0)
2020–2021	FC Rouen	0	(0)
2021–2023	Chantilly	46	(8)
2023–2024	Paris 13 Atletico	26	(6)
2024–2025	Nîmes	16	(0)
2025–	Paris 13 Atletico	10	(1)

International career^{‡}
2018	Algeria U20	1	(0)
- * Club domestic league appearances and goals as of 23 June 2026 ‡ National team caps and goals as of 23:19, 16 April 2023 (UTC)

Abdelmalek Amara (born 10 March 2000) is a professional footballer who plays for Ligue 3 club Paris 13 Atletico. Born in France, he represented Algeria at youth international level.

== Club career ==
Having been part of Le Havre and Bastia youth setup, a documentary was shot by Fabrice Macaux on his career and his hopes of becoming a professional footballer.

== International career ==
Born in France, Amara is of Algerian descent. He represented the Algeria U20s in May 2018.
