= Paris 13 Atletico =

Football club based in Paris, France

- Full name: Paris 13 Atletico
- Nickname: Les Gobelins
- Founded: 1968; 58 years ago
- Ground: Stade Sébastien Charléty
- Capacity: 20,000
- Chairmen: Philippe Surmon; Frédéric Pereira
- Manager: Stéphane Rossi
- League: Ligue 3
- 2025–26: Championnat National, 14th of 17
- Website: paris13atletico.fr
Home colours	Away colours

Paris 13 Atletico (French pronunciation: [paʁi tʁɛz‿atletiko]) is a French professional football club based in the 13th arrondissement of Paris competing in the Ligue 3, the third tier of French football.

== History ==
The club was founded in 1968 as Football Club Gobelins.

It was renamed Football Club des Gobelins Paris 13 after a merger in 2012 with Stade Olympique de Paris.

In June 2020 the club announced it would rebrand to the current name to assert its Parisian identity.

In 2022, the club was promoted to Championnat National, the third tier of French football, for the first time in its history.

In 2026, the club confirmed the permanent relocation of its senior team to the Stade Sébastien Charléty, leaving their former home ground the Stade Pelé ahead of the inaugural 2026–27 Ligue 3 season.

== Squad ==
As of 5 September 2026

Note: Flags indicate national team as defined under FIFA eligibility rules; some limited exceptions apply. Players may hold more than one non-FIFA nationality.

No.	Pos.	Nation	Player
4	DF	SEN	Christophe Diedhiou
5	DF	FRA	Jordan Poha
6	MF	FRA	Ibrahim Camara
8	MF	FRA	Omar Bezzekhami
9	FW	FRA	Bonota Traoré
10	FW	ALG	Abdelmalek Amara
11	FW	MLI	Aboubacar Sidibé (on loan from Sochaux)
13	MF	FRA	Leny Marthe
16	GK	FRA	Sasha Bernard
17	FW	FRA	Mamadou Kébé
18	DF	FRA	Enzo-Noël Dodé (on loan from Sochaux)

No.	Pos.	Nation	Player
19	DF	CIV	Ibrahim Koné
20	DF	FRA	Jésah Ayessa
21	FW	ALG	Mattheo Guendez (on loan from Nancy)
22	MF	FRA	Etienne Michut
23	FW	FRA	Inza Koné
24	DF	FRA	Nicolas Bernardiño
26	MF	FRA	Stacy Misiatu
27	FW	FRA	Fodié Camara
28	MF	FRA	Qays Salhi
29	MF	FRA	Noa Donat
30	GK	FRA	Axel Temperton
—	DF	FRA	Hady Camara

== Famous players ==
- (France) Gady Beyuku (youth)
- (France) Soungoutou Magassa (youth)
- (France) Jordy Makengo (youth)
- (France) Arnaud Nordin (youth)
- (France) Wissam Ben Yedder
