= Romain Sans =

French footballer (born 1999)

Personal information
- Date of birth: 19 March 1999 (age 27)
- Place of birth: Foix, France
- Height: 1.76 m (5 ft 9 in)
- Position: Leftback

Team information
- Current team: Lahti
- Number: 3

Senior career*
Years	Team	Apps	(Gls)
2016–2020	Sochaux B	39	(0)
2018–2021	Sochaux	10	(0)
2021–2023	Châteauroux B	27	(2)
2021–2023	Châteauroux	3	(0)
2023	→ Concarneau (loan)	14	(0)
2023–2024	Concarneau	13	(0)
2025–	Lahti	41	(0)
- * Club domestic league appearances and goals as of 13 November 2026

Romain Sans (born 19 March 1999) is a French professional footballer who plays as a defender for Lahti in Veikkausliiga.

== Club career ==
Sans made his professional debut with Sochaux in a 1–0 Ligue 2 win over FC Lorient on 22 December 2018.

On 17 June 2021, he joined Châteauroux for the term of two seasons. On 31 January 2023, Sans was loaned to Concarneau.

On 28 March 2025, Sans joined Finnish Ykkösliiga club Lahti.

== Career statistics ==
As of 13 November 2026

Appearances and goals by club, season and competition
Club	Season	League			National cup (Note: Includes Coupe de France and Suomen Cup)		Other		Total	
Club	Season	Division	Apps	Goals	Apps	Goals	Apps	Goals	Apps	Goals
Sochaux B	2016–17	CFA 2	10	0	–		–		10	0
Sochaux B	2017–18	National 3	3	0	–		–		3	0
Sochaux B	2018–19	National 3	22	0	–		–		22	0
Sochaux B	2019–20	National 3	4	0	–		–		4	0
Sochaux B	2020–21	National 3	0	0	–		–		0	0
Sochaux B	Total		39	0	0	0	0	0	39	0
Sochaux	2018–19	Ligue 2	2	0	1	0	–		3	0
Sochaux	2019–20	Ligue 2	0	0	0	0	–		0	0
Sochaux	2020–21	Ligue 2	8	0	0	0	–		8	0
Sochaux	Total		10	0	1	0	0	0	11	0
Châteauroux	2021–22	National	2	0	0	0	–		2	0
Châteauroux	2022–23	National	1	0	0	0	–		1	0
Châteauroux	Total		3	0	0	0	0	0	3	0
Châteauroux B	2021–22	National 3	17	2	–		–		17	2
Châteauroux B	2022–23	National 3	10	0	–		–		10	0
Châteauroux B	Total		27	2	0	0	0	0	27	2
Concarneau (loan)	2022–23	National	14	0	0	0	–		14	0
Concarneau	2023–24	Ligue 2	13	0	1	0	–		14	0
Lahti	2025	Ykkösliiga	21	0	1	0	1 (Note: Includes Ykkösliigacup)	0	23	0
Lahti	2026	Veikkausliiga	20	0	3	0	1 (Note: Includes Finnish League Cup)	0	24	0
Lahti	Total		41	0	4	0	2	0	47	0
Career total			147	2	6	0	2	0	155	2
