= Manuel Semedo =

Portuguese footballer (born 2000)

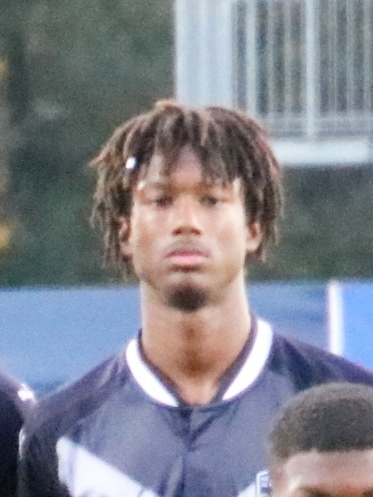
- Semedo in October 2017

Personal information
- Full name: Manuel Semedo Da Veiga
- Date of birth: 20 January 2000 (age 26)
- Place of birth: Maisons-Laffitte, France
- Height: 1.80 m (5 ft 11 in)
- Position: Forward

Team information
- Current team: St Ouen l'Aumône

Senior career*
Years	Team	Apps	(Gls)
2017–2019	Bordeaux II	11	(0)
2019–2021	Sochaux II	12	(4)
2020–2021	Sochaux	3	(0)
2021–2022	Dunkerque	3	(0)
2022–2023	Les Herbiers	23	(4)
2023–2024	Stade Briochin II	21	(3)
2023–2024	Stade Briochin	1	(0)
2024–	St Ouen l'Aumône	6	(1)
- * Club domestic league appearances and goals as of 7 December 2024

Manuel Semedo Da Veiga (born 20 January 2000) is a French professional footballer who plays as a forward for Championnat National 3 club St Ouen l'Aumône.

== Club career ==
On 5 November 2019, Semedo signed his first professional contract with Sochaux. He made his professional debut with Sochaux in a 2-2 Ligue 2 tie with Rodez AF on 19 September 2020. In July 2021, he signed for USL Dunkerque, following a trial. In September 2022, he signed for Les Herbiers VF.

== International career ==
Born in France, Semedo is of Cape Verdean descent and eligible to represent Portugal as well. He was called up to a training camp for the France U17s and Portugal U18s without making an appearance for either.
