= Steve Ambri =

Association football player (born 1997)

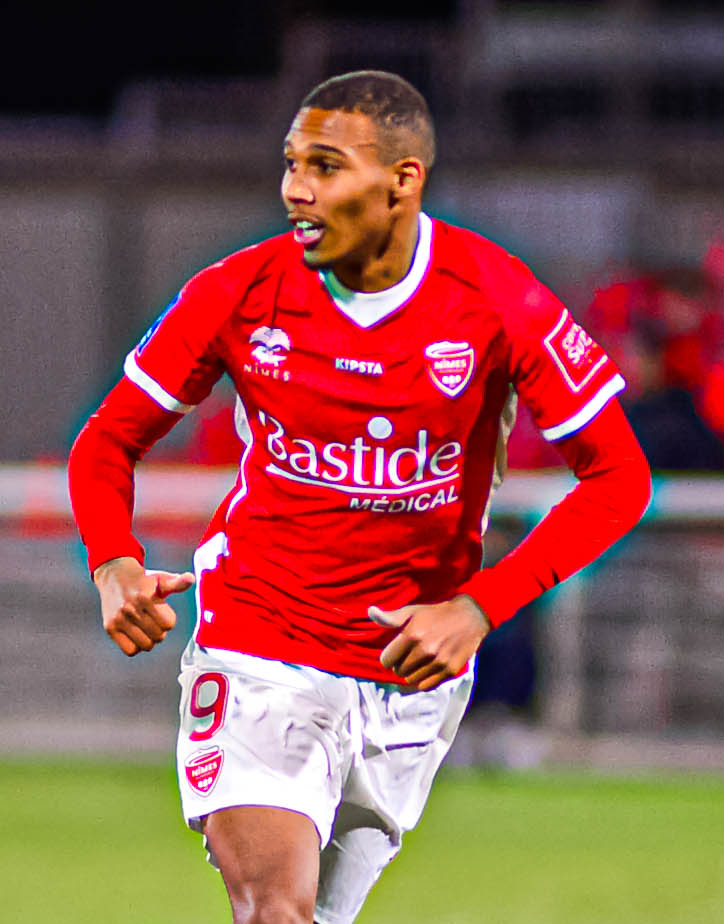
- Ambri with Nîmes in 2023

Personal information
- Full name: Steve Brahim Joshep Omar Ambri
- Date of birth: 12 August 1997 (age 29)
- Place of birth: Mont-Saint-Aignan, France
- Height: 1.78 m (5 ft 10 in)
- Position: Forward

Team information
- Current team: Omonia 29M
- Number: 45

Youth career
- 2003–2010: SC Frileuse
- 2010–2012: Le Havre
- 2012–2014: SC Frileuse
- 2014–2015: Gonfreville

Senior career*
Years	Team	Apps	(Gls)
2015	Gonfreville	3	(0)
2015–2020	Valenciennes II	9	(2)
2016–2020	Valenciennes	60	(2)
2020–2022	Sochaux	56	(5)
2022	Sheriff Tiraspol	8	(4)
2023	Nîmes	14	(0)
2023	Jamshedpur	5	(1)
2024	Khon Kaen United	8	(0)
2025–	Omonia 29M	34	(26)

International career^{‡}
2018	France U20	4	(2)
2021–	Guinea-Bissau	5	(0)
- * Club domestic league appearances and goals as of 10 November 2026 ‡ National team caps and goals as of 19:39, 25 December 2022 (UTC)

Steve Brahim Joshep Omar Ambri (born 12 August 1997) is a professional footballer who plays as a forward for Omonia 29M. Born in France, he plays for the Guinea-Bissau national team.

== Club career ==
Ambri made his professional debut for Valenciennes FC in a Ligue 2 1–1 tie with AJ Auxerre on 16 December 2016.

On 12 July 2022, Ambri signed a two-year contract with Sheriff Tiraspol in Moldova.

On 30 January 2023, Ambri joined Nîmes in Ligue 2 until the end of the 2022–23 season.

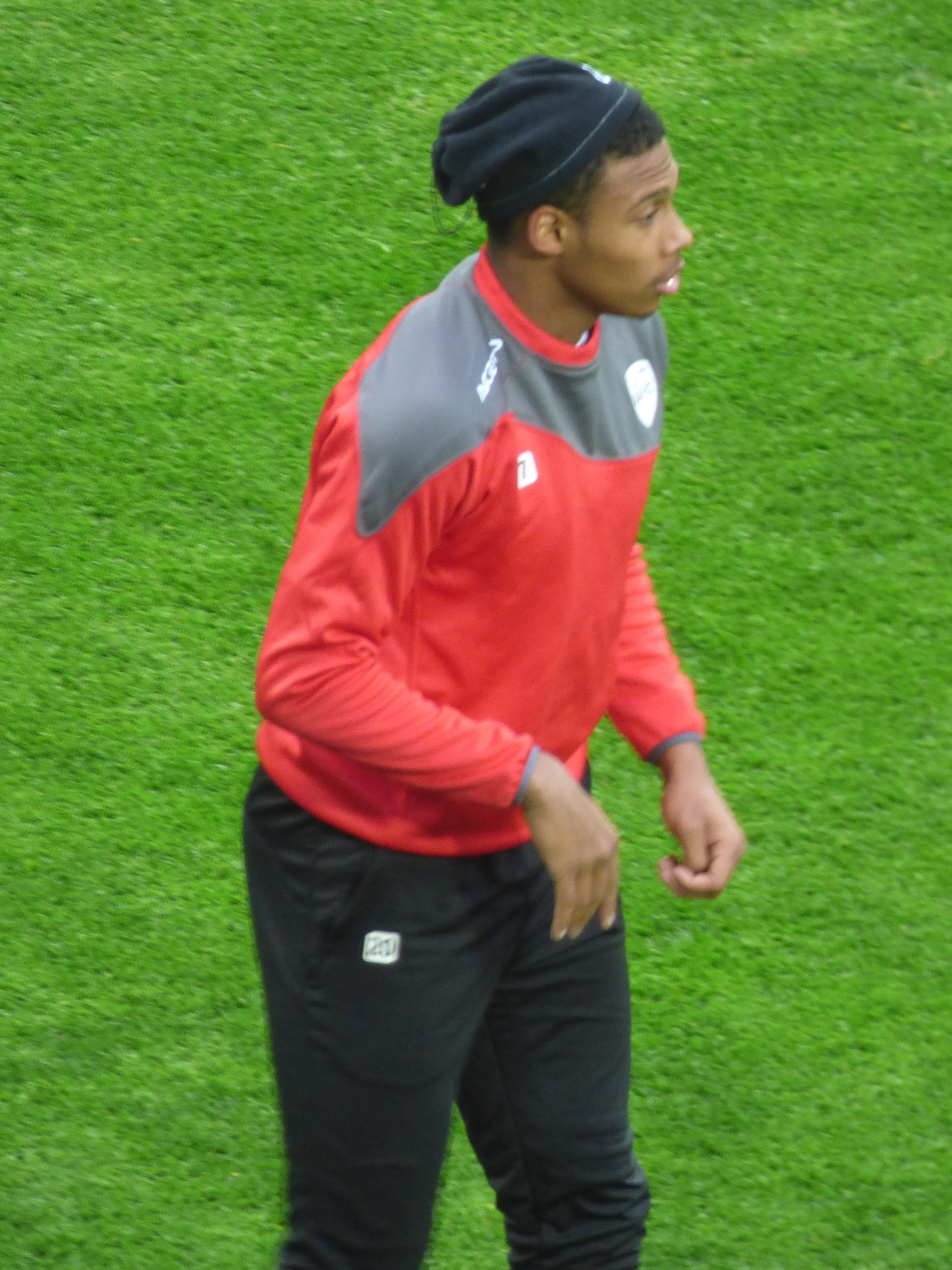
Ambri with Valenciennes in 2019

== International career ==
Ambri was born in France and is of Senegalese, Bissau-Guinean and Algerian descent. Ambri received a call-up to represent the France national under-20 football team for the 2018 Toulon Tournament on 17 May 2018. He scored on his debut against the South Korea U20s on 28 May 2018. He debuted with the Guinea-Bissau national team in a 0–0 2022 FIFA World Cup qualification tie with Guinea on 12 November 2021.
