= Christophe Diedhiou =

Senegalese footballer (born 1988)

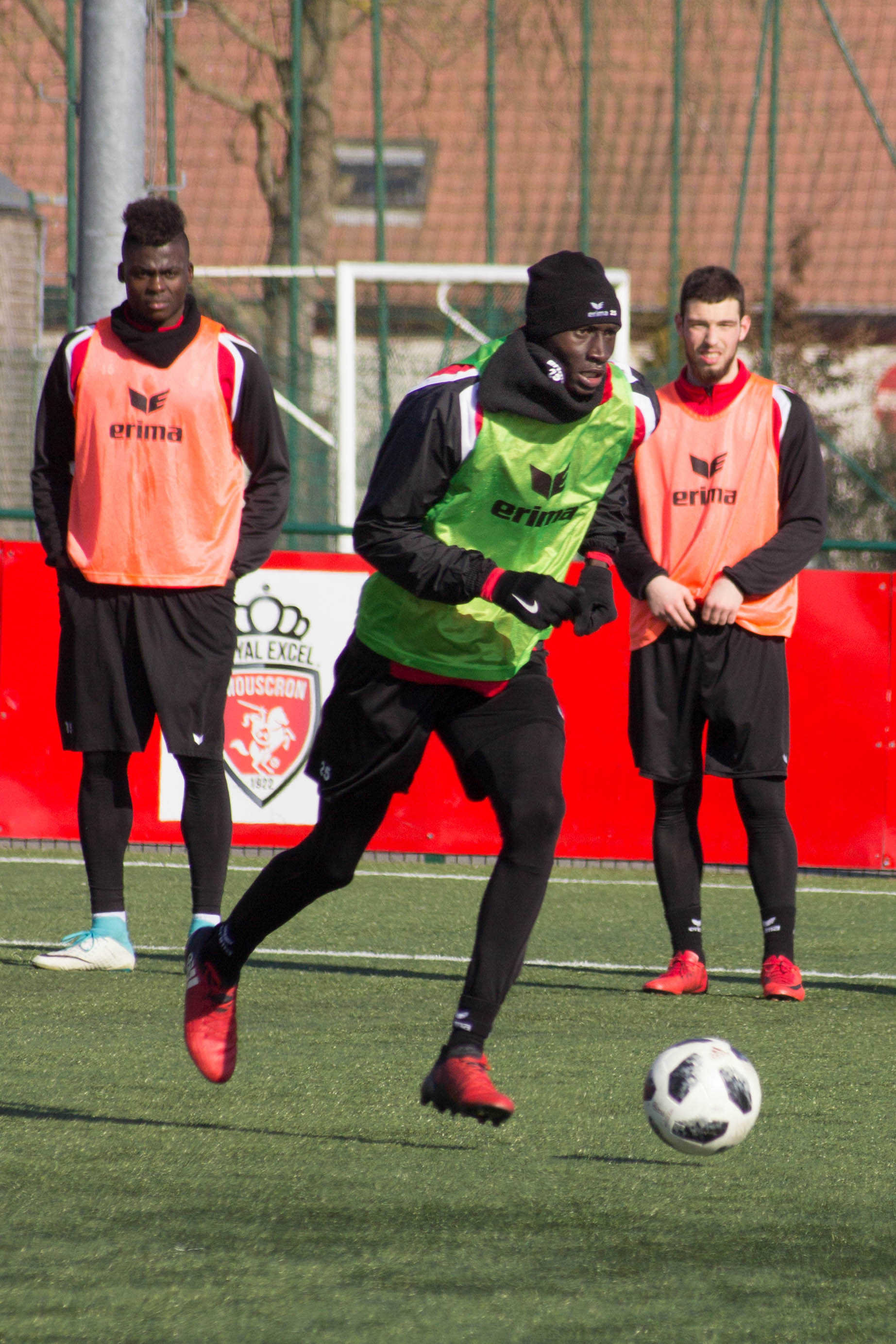
- Diedhiou with Mouscron in February 2018

Personal information
- Date of birth: 8 January 1988 (age 38)
- Place of birth: Mbao, Senegal
- Height: 1.91 m (6 ft 3 in)
- Position: Centre back

Team information
- Current team: Paris 13 Atletico
- Number: 4

Senior career*
Years	Team	Apps	(Gls)
2010–2012	Épinal	56	(1)
2012–2016	Créteil	117	(6)
2016–2017	Gazélec Ajaccio	18	(1)
2017–2019	Mouscron	17	(0)
2019–2022	Sochaux	61	(1)
2022–2023	Quevilly-Rouen	11	(2)
2024–2026	St Maur Lusitanos	54	(1)
2026–	Paris 13 Atletico	1	(0)

International career
2014	Senegal	1	(0)
- * Club domestic league appearances and goals as of 5 September 2026

Christophe Diedhiou (born 8 January 1988) is a Senegalese professional footballer who plays as a centre-back for Ligue 3 club Paris 13 Atletico. He played one match for the Senegal national team in 2014.

== Personal life ==
Diedhiou was born in Mbao, Senegal. He holds Senegalese and French nationalities.

== Club career ==
On 27 June 2022, Diedhiou signed with Ligue 2 club Quevilly-Rouen.

== International career ==
Diedhiou made his senior international debut for Senegal as a second-half substitute in a friendly against Colombia on 31 May 2014.
