= Aubin Long =

French footballer (born 1997)

Personal information
- Full name: Aubin Pierre Joseph Long
- Date of birth: 20 March 1997 (age 29)
- Place of birth: Orange, France
- Height: 1.85 m (6 ft 1 in)
- Position: Goalkeeper

Team information
- Current team: Géménos

Youth career
- 2003–2010: Nyons
- 2010–2013: Orange
- 2012–2016: Sochaux

Senior career*
Years	Team	Apps	(Gls)
2014–2020	Sochaux II	84	(0)
2015–2021	Sochaux	1	(0)
2021–2024	Aubagne	18	(0)
2024–	Géménos		
- * Club domestic league appearances and goals as of 1 July 2024

Aubin Pierre Joseph Long (born 20 March 1997) is a French professional footballer who plays as a goalkeeper for Géménos.

== Club career ==
On 20 June 2017, Long signed his first professional contract with the club. He made his professional debut with Sochaux in a 0–0 Ligue 2 tie with SM Caen on 26 July 2019, holding a clean sheet in his debut.
