= Sofiane Daham =

Algerian professional footballer (born 1996)

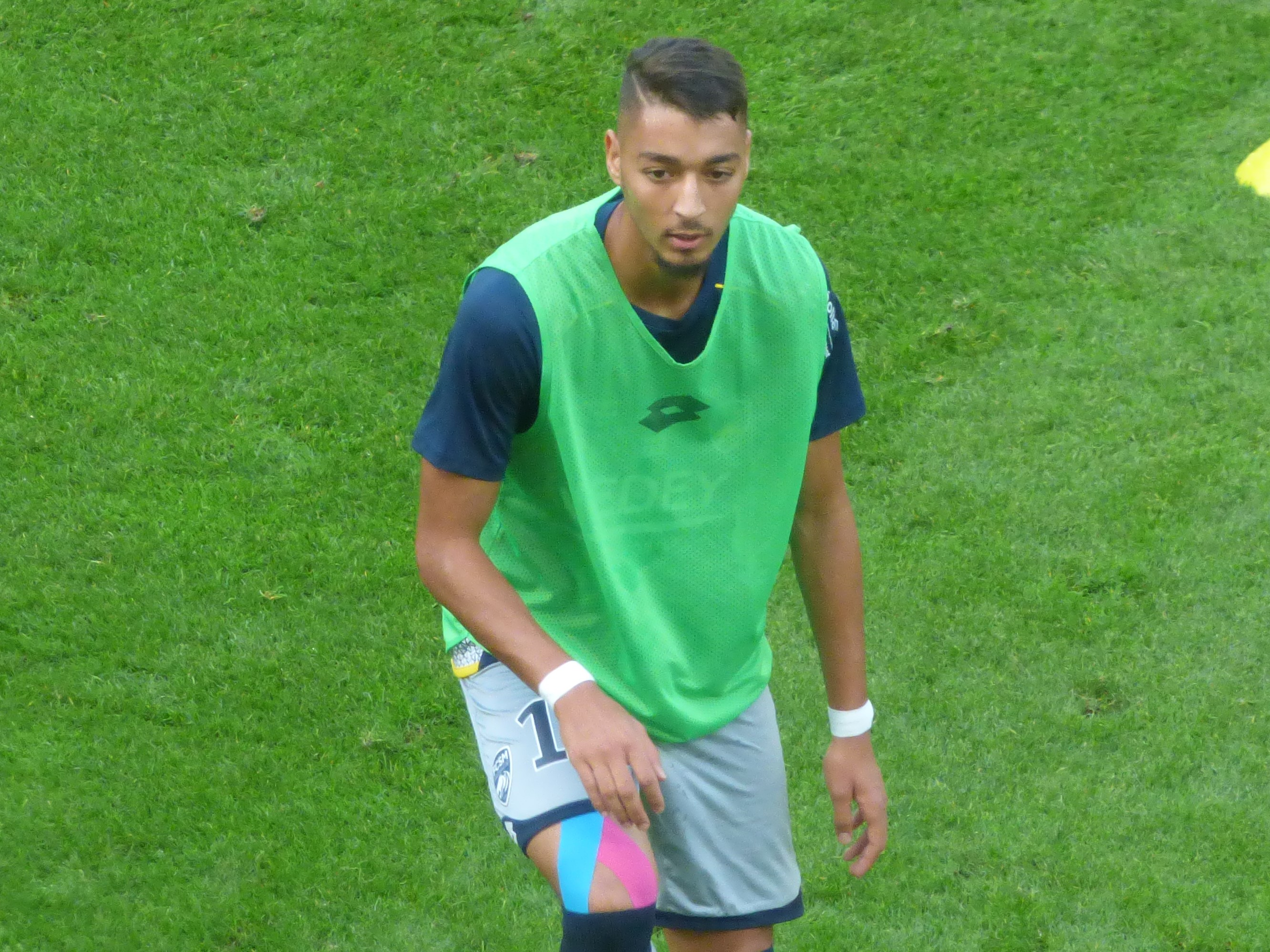
- Daham with Sochaux in September 2018

Personal information
- Date of birth: 15 January 1996 (age 30)
- Place of birth: Saïda, Algeria
- Height: 1.80 m (5 ft 11 in)
- Position: Midfielder

Team information
- Current team: Mondorf-les-Bains
- Number: 14

Youth career
- 2011–2015: Sochaux

Senior career*
Years	Team	Apps	(Gls)
2014–2019	Sochaux II	61	(5)
2015–2021	Sochaux	84	(5)
2021–2023	Châteauroux	39	(1)
2021–2023	Châteauroux II	11	(1)
2024–2025	Progrès Niederkorn	34	(2)
2025–	Mondorf-les-Bains	8	(1)
- * Club domestic league appearances and goals as of 13 June 2026

Sofiane Daham (born 15 January 1996) is an Algerian professional footballer who plays as a midfielder for Mondorf-les-Bains.

== Personal life ==
Sofiane Daham was born in Algeria. He holds Algerian and French nationalities.

== Career ==
Daham won the Gambardella Cup in 2015. In January 2016, he signed a professional contract with Sochaux.

In October 2017 he was called up to the Algerian national team.

On 2 July 2021, he moved to Châteauroux on a two-year contract.
