= Bryan Lasme =

French footballer (born 1998)

Personal information
- Date of birth: 14 November 1998 (age 27)
- Place of birth: Montauban, France
- Height: 1.94 m (6 ft 4 in)
- Positions: Winger; forward

Team information
- Current team: Schalke 04
- Number: 11

Youth career
- 2006–2007: JE Montalbanais
- 2007–2014: Montauban FCTG
- 2014–2017: Sochaux

Senior career*
Years	Team	Apps	(Gls)
2015–2020	Sochaux II	39	(6)
2017–2021	Sochaux	58	(13)
2018–2019	→ Cholet (loan)	16	(0)
2021–2023	Arminia Bielefeld	55	(9)
2023–	Schalke 04	46	(6)
2025	→ Grasshopper (loan)	4	(0)
2026–	Schalke 04 II	1	(0)

International career
2018	France U20	3	(1)
- * Club domestic league appearances and goals as of 3 November 2026

Bryan Lasme (French pronunciation: [bʁajan lam]; born 14 November 1998) is a French professional footballer who plays as a winger or forward for Bundesliga club Schalke 04.

== Club career ==
=== Sochaux ===
Lasme signed his first professional contract with Sochaux on 24 January 2017. He made his professional debut for Sochaux in a 3–3 Ligue 2 tie with Clermont Foot on 20 January 2017.

==== Loan to Cholet ====
In September 2018, Lasme was loaned to Championnat National side Cholet for the 2018–19 season.

=== Arminia Bielefeld ===
In June 2021, Lasme signed for Arminia Bielefeld.

=== Schalke 04 ===
On 24 June 2023, Lasme moved to Schalke 04 on a free transfer, signing a four-year contract.

==== Loan to Grasshopper ====
In January 2025, Lasme was loaned to Swiss Super League club Grasshopper until the end of the season. He returned to Schalke at the end of the season, having made just four appearances off the bench for the Swiss record champions.

== International career ==
Born in France, Lasme is of Ivorian descent. He received a call-up to represent the France national under-20 football team for the 2018 Toulon Tournament on 17 May 2018.

== Career statistics ==
=== Club ===
As of match played 31 October 2026

Appearances and goals by club, season and competition
Club	Season	League			National cup (Note: Includes Coupe de France, DFB-Pokal)		League cup (Note: Includes Coupe de la Ligue)		Other (Note: Includes 2. Bundesliga relegation play-offs)		Total	
Club	Season	Division	Apps	Goals	Apps	Goals	Apps	Goals	Apps	Goals	Apps	Goals
Sochaux II	2014–15	Championnat National 2	1	0	—		—		—		1	0
Sochaux II	2015–16	Championnat National 2	2	0	—		—		—		2	0
Sochaux II	2016–17	Championnat National 3	19	2	—		—		—		19	2
Sochaux II	2017–18	Championnat National 3	15	1	—		—		—		15	1
Sochaux II	2018–19	Championnat National 3	1	2	—		—		—		1	2
Sochaux II	2019–20	Championnat National 3	1	1	—		—		—		1	1
Sochaux II	Total		39	6	—		—		—		39	6
Sochaux	2016–17	Ligue 2	1	0	0	0	0	0	—		1	0
Sochaux	2017–18	Ligue 2	9	1	0	0	0	0	—		9	1
Sochaux	2018–19	Ligue 2	1	0	0	0	1	0	—		2	0
Sochaux	2019–20	Ligue 2	15	3	0	0	1	1	—		16	4
Sochaux	2020–21	Ligue 2	32	9	2	0	—		—		34	9
Sochaux	Total		58	13	2	0	2	1	—		62	14
Cholet (loan)	2018–19	Championnat National	16	0	1	0	—		—		17	0
Arminia Bielefeld	2021–22	Bundesliga	23	2	2	2	—		—		25	4
Arminia Bielefeld	2022–23	2. Bundesliga	32	7	2	1	—		2	0	36	8
Arminia Bielefeld	Total		55	9	4	3	—		2	0	61	12
Schalke 04	2023–24	2. Bundesliga	27	4	2	0	—		—		29	4
Schalke 04	2024–25	2. Bundesliga	6	0	0	0	—		—		6	0
Schalke 04	2025–26	2. Bundesliga	12	2	1	1	—		—		13	3
Schalke 04	2026–27	Bundesliga	1	0	0	0	–		—		1	0
Schalke 04	Total		46	6	3	1	—		—		49	7
Grasshopper (loan)	2024–25	Swiss Super League	4	0	—		—		—		4	0
Schalke 04 II	2026–27	Regionalliga West	1	0	—		—		—		1	0
Career total			219	34	10	4	2	1	2	0	233	39

== Honours ==
Schalke 04

- 2. Bundesliga: 2025–26
