= Melvin Sitti =

French footballer (born 2000)

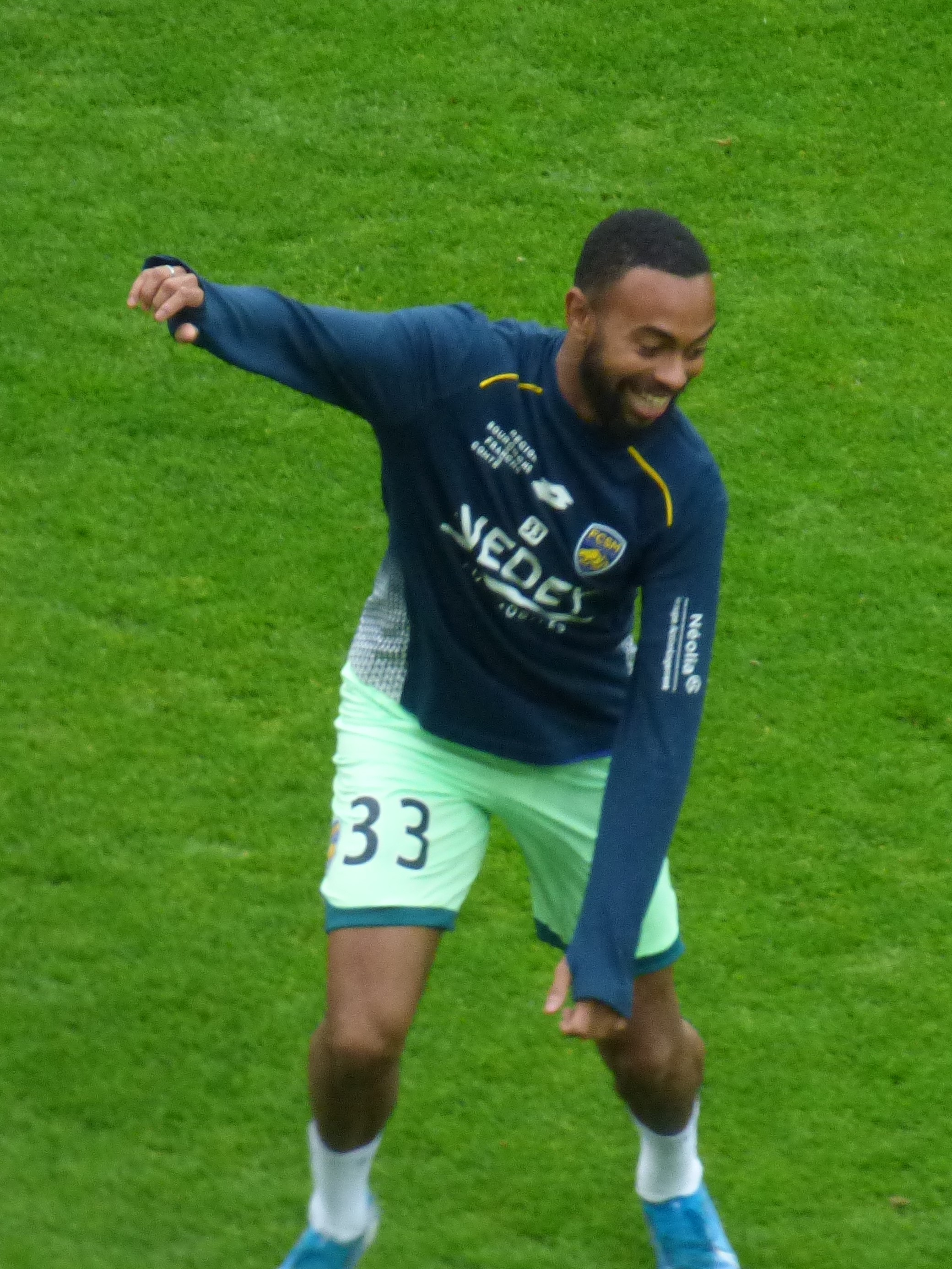
- Sitti with Sochaux in 2019

Personal information
- Full name: Melvin Ayikoe Fares Sitti
- Date of birth: 14 February 2000 (age 26)
- Place of birth: Paris, France
- Height: 1.82 m (6 ft 0 in)
- Position: Midfielder

Team information
- Current team: Marignane GCB
- Number: 28

Youth career
- 2011–2013: CO Vincennes
- 2013–2017: Paris FC

Senior career*
Years	Team	Apps	(Gls)
2017–2019	Sochaux II	24	(1)
2019–2020	Sochaux	13	(0)
2020–2021	Norwich City	0	(0)
2020	→ Sochaux (loan)	4	(0)
2020	→ Waasland-Beveren (loan)	0	(0)
2022	Annecy	0	(0)
2022–2023	Guingamp B	2	(0)
2023–2024	FC 93 Bobigny	13	(1)
2024–	Marignane GCB	10	(0)
- * Club domestic league appearances and goals as of 23 November 2024

Melvin Ayikoe Fares Sitti (born 14 February 2000) is a French professional footballer who plays as a midfielder for Championnat National 1 club Marignane GCB.

== Early life ==
Sitti was born in Paris and is of Togolese descent.

== Career ==
A youth product of Paris FC, Sitti joined Sochaux in 2017. He made his professional debut for the club in a 0–0 Ligue 2 tie with Caen on 26 July 2019.

On 28 January 2020, Sitti signed for Premier League club Norwich City on a four-and-a-half-year contract before being loaned back to Sochaux for the rest of the season. On 30 August 2021, his contract with Norwich was terminated by mutual consent.

On 1 January 2022, Sitti signed with Championnat National side Annecy. On 15 September 2022, he transferred to the reserves of Guingamp.
