= Jésah Ayessa =

French footballer (born 2000)

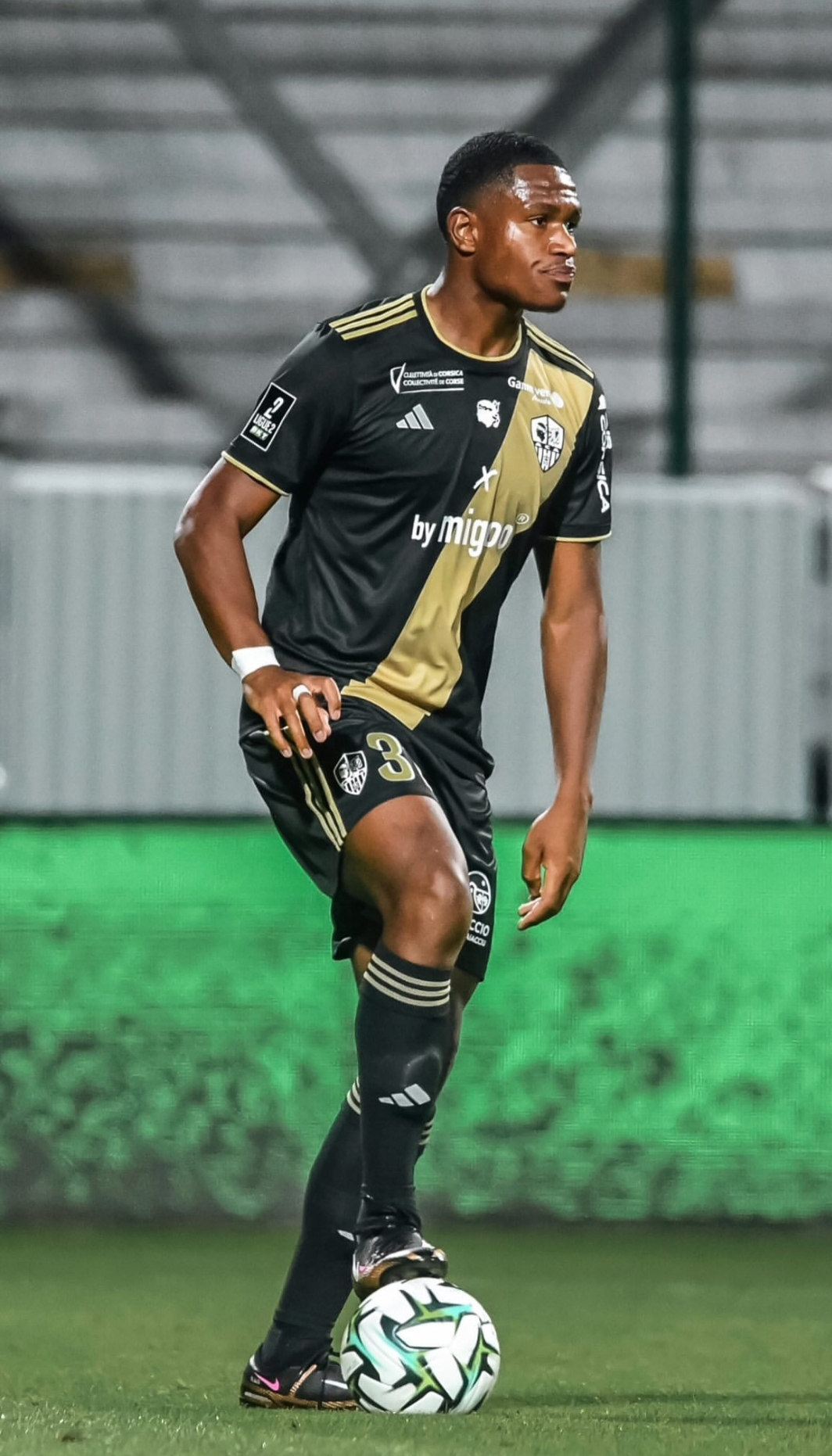
- Ayessa in 2024

Personal information
- Full name: Jésah Mabepa Ayessa Ondze
- Date of birth: 9 January 2000 (age 26)
- Place of birth: Paris, France
- Height: 1.88 m (6 ft 2 in)
- Position: Centre-back

Team information
- Current team: Paris 13 Atletico
- Number: 20

Youth career
- 2005–2009: FC Maisons-Alfort
- 2009–2017: Toulouse Fontaines
- 2017–2019: Istres

Senior career*
| Years | Team | Apps | (Gls) |
| 2019–2020 | Sochaux II | 4 | (0) |
| 2020–2021 | Gueugnon | 1 | (0) |
| 2021–2022 | Saint-Alban | | |
| 2022–2023 | Romorantin | 10 | (0) |
| 2023–2024 | Le Puy | 21 | (0) |
| 2024–2025 | Ajaccio | 25 | (0) |
| 2026 | Dinamo Samarqand | 0 | (0) |
| 2026– | Paris 13 Atletico | 1 | (0) |
- * Club domestic league appearances and goals as of 15:35, 13 August 2026 (UTC)

Jésah Mabepa Ayessa Ondze (born 9 January 2000) is a French professional footballer who plays as a centre-back for Ligue 3 club Paris 13 Atletico.

== Club career ==
Ayessa is a product of the youth academies of FC Maisons-Alfort, Toulouse Fontaines, and Istres. He began his senior career with Sochaux's reserves in 2019. On 22 June 2020, he transferred to Gueugnon. He followed that up with a year-long stint in the Régional 1 with Saint-Alban. On 11 August 2022, he transferred to Romorantin. In the summer of 2023, he moved to Le Puy. On 27 May 2024, he transferred to the Ligue 2 club Ajaccio on a contract until 2027.

== Personal life ==
Born in France, Ayessa is of Brazzaville-Congolese descent.
