= 2006 UC Santa Barbara Gauchos men's soccer team =

American college soccer season

2006 UC Santa Barbara Gauchos men's soccer

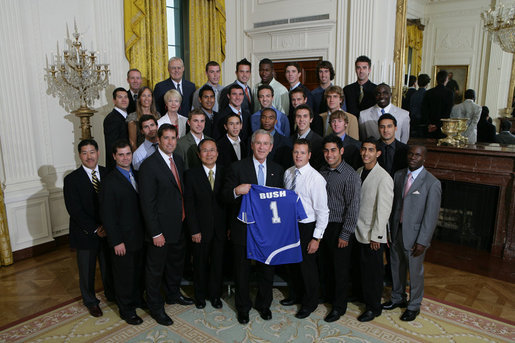
- Santa Barbara visiting president George W. Bush (holding a team jersey) at the White House

National Champions

Big West Conference champions Bryant & Sons Cup winners
- Conference: Big West Conference
- Record: 17–7–1 (7–3–0 Big West)
- Head coach: Tim Vom Steeg (8th season)
- Captain: Bryan Byrne and Andy Iro
- Home stadium: Harder Stadium

2006 Big West Conference men's soccer standings
	Conf.					Overall
Team	W		L		T	W		L		T
No. 1 UC Santa Barbara ‡	7	–	3	–	0	17	–	7	–	1
UC Irvine	6	–	3	–	1	13	–	4	–	3
CSU Northridge	5	–	2	–	3	8	–	6	–	5
Cal Poly	3	–	5	–	2	7	–	8	–	4
CSU Fullerton	3	–	7	–	0	7	–	11	–	1
UC Riverside	2	–	7	–	1	5	–	13	–	1
‡ – 2006 Big West Tournament champion + – Invited to the 2006 NCAA Division I Men's Soccer Championship; As of December 3, 2006; Rankings from United Soccer Coaches

The 2006 UC Santa Barbara Gauchos men's soccer team represented the University of California, Santa Barbara during the 2006 NCAA Division I men's soccer season. It was the 41st season of the team fielding a varsity college soccer team, and their 24th season playing in the Big West Conference.

The season was highlighted by the Gauchos winning their first NCAA Division I Men's Soccer Championship, in which they won the final against UCLA Bruins in the final in St. Louis. It was the first season since 1989 that a team from a mid-major conference won the NCAA Championship, a feat that would not be accomplished until the University of Akron did so in 2010.

== Background ==
Following a debut College Cup run in 2004, the Gauchos had a relative slump in 2005, finishing with a 13–5–3 overall record, and a 7–1–2 Big West record, good enough for second in the conference. The Gauchos finished the season ranked 23rd in the nation. Despite not winning the Big West championship, UCSB earned an at-large berth into the 2005 NCAA Division I Men's Soccer Championship, where they advanced to the second round, before losing 3–2 to conference rival, Cal State Northridge.

== Review ==
Before the start of preseason, UCSB defender and two-time All-American, Andy Iro was named to the Hermann Trophy watch list. Iro was also the reigning Big West Defensive Player of the Year. Additionally, the squad entered the season ranked 21st in the nation, and was composed of the 22nd strongest recruiting class. The recruiting class featured future MLS all-stars including Eric Avila and Chris Pontius. In the Big West preseason coaches poll, UCSB was picked to win the conference title. The team named Iro and senior Bryan Byrne as co-captains for the season.

Ahead of the 2006 regular season, the Gauchos played Westmont College for the 42nd Annual Bryant and Sons Cup, a pre-season friendly that pits the two Santa Barbara universities against each other in a soccer match. Played in front of 1,000 spectators at Harder Stadium, the Gauchos emerged victorious, with a 6–0 victory over the Warriors. Bongomin Otti netted a hat trick in the match while Bryan Byrne netted two goals. Nick Perera added a goal in the 90th minute to cap off the result.

The regular season began with a cross-country flight to Virginia, where the Gauchos participated in the UVA Soccer Classic in Charlottesville, Virginia. Their opening game was against the seventh-ranked Akron Zips, where they won in a convincing 5–0 victory. Otii and Avila both netted two goals for the Gauchos, along with a single goal from Tino Nuñez.

== Roster ==
Final 2006 roster.

Note: Flags indicate national team as defined under FIFA eligibility rules; some limited exceptions apply. Players may hold more than one non-FIFA nationality.

No.	Pos.	Nation	Player
1	GK	USA	Kyle Reynish
2	DF	USA	Jeff Murphy
3	MF	USA	David Walker
4	DF	ENG	Andy Iro
5	MF	USA	Jon Curry
6	DF	USA	Greg Curry
7	MF	IRL	Bryan Byrne
8	FW	USA	Paul Kierstead
9	FW	USA	Tino Nuñez
10	MF	CAN	Tyler Rosenlund
11	MF	USA	Alfonso Motagalvan
12	MF	GHA	Eric Frimpong
13	MF	USA	Chris Pontius
14	FW	ESP	Nick Perera

No.	Pos.	Nation	Player
15	MF	USA	Eric Avila
16	MF	USA	Evan Patterson
17	MF	USA	Brennan Tennelle
18	DF	USA	Kyle Kaveny
19	FW	CAN	Andrew Proctor
20	FW	USA	Bongomin Otii
22	GK	USA	Bryant Rueckner
23	FW	USA	Tony Chinakwe
24	GK	USA	Jason Badger
25	MF	USA	Jordan Kaplan
28	MF	USA	Drew Gleason
29	MF	USA	C.J. Cintas
30	FW	USA	Guillermo Jalomo

== Schedule ==
Date Time, TV	Rank^{#}	Opponent^{#}	Result	Record	Site City, State
Exhibition
08-19-2006*; 7:00 pm	No. 21	Westmont; Bryant & Sons Cup	W 6–0		Harder Stadium (1,062); Santa Barbara, CA
Regular season
08-25-2006*; 4:00 pm	No. 21	vs. No. 7 Akron; UVA Soccer Classic	W 5–0	1–0–0	Klöckner Stadium (49); Charlottesville, VA
08-27-2006*; 1:00 pm	No. 21	at No. 3 Virginia; UVA Soccer Classic	L 0–1	1–1–0	Klöckner Stadium (2,640); Charlottesville, VA
09-02-2006*; 7:00 pm	No. 9	No. 21 San Diego State	W 1–0	2–1–0	Harder Stadium (1,021); Santa Barbara, CA
09-05-2006; 7:00 pm	No. 7	Cal Poly; Blue–Green Rivalry	W 1–0	3–1–0 (1–0–0)	Harder Stadium (924); Santa Barbara, CA
09-08-2006*; 7:30 pm	No. 7	No. 18 UIC	L 1–2	3–2–0	Harder Stadium (856); Santa Barbara, CA
09-15-2006*; 7:30 pm	No. 14	Loyola Marymount	W 1–0	4–2–0	Harder Stadium (2,158); Santa Barbara, CA
09-21-2006; 8:00 pm	No. 12	at Cal State Fullerton	W 2–1	5–2–0 (2–0–0)	Titan Stadium (802); Fullerton, CA
09-23-2006*; 7:00 pm	No. 12	at UC Davis	L 0–1	5–3–0	Aggie Field (780); Davis, CA
09-27-2006; 7:00 pm	No. 19	at Cal State Northridge	L 0–5	5–4–0 (2–1–0)	Performance Field (521); Northridge, CA
09-30-2006*; 7:00 pm	No. 19	Michigan	W 1–0 ^{2OT}	6–4–0	Harder Stadium (3,577); Santa Barbara, CA
10-05-2006*; 7:00 pm		No. 7 UCLA; UCLA rivalry	L 1–3	6–5–0	Harder Stadium (5,475); Santa Barbara, CA
10-07-2006; 7:00 pm		No. 15 UC Irvine	W 2–0	7–5–0 (3–1–0)	Harder Stadium (2,367); Santa Barbara, CA
10-11-2006; 7:00 pm		at UC Riverside	L 0–1	7–6–0 (3–2–0)	UC Riverside Soccer Stadium (576); Riverside, CA
10-14-2006; 7:00 pm		at Cal Poly	W 2–0	8–6–0 (4–2–0)	Alex G. Spanos Stadium (1,123); San Luis Obispo, CA
10-18-2006*; 7:30 pm		UC Davis	W 1–0	9–6–0	Harder Stadium (1,061); Santa Barbara, CA
10-21-2006; 7:30 pm		Cal State Fullerton	W 1–0	10–6–0 (5–2–0)	Harder Stadium (1,447); Santa Barbara, CA
10-25-2006; 7:30 pm		Cal State Northridge	W 1–0	11–6–0 (6–2–0)	Harder Stadium (2,434); Santa Barbara, CA
11-01-2006; 7:30 pm	No. 25	at No. 18 UC Irvine	L 0–2	11–7–0 (6–3–0)	Anteater Stadium (1,561); Irvine, CA
11-04-2006; 7:00 pm	No. 25	UC Riverside	W 4–0	12–7–0 (7–3–0)	Harder Stadium (1,647); Santa Barbara, CA
NCAA Tournament
11-11-2006*; 1:00 pm	No. 17	San Diego State; First Round	W 2–1	13–7–0	Harder Stadium (2,356); Santa Barbara, CA
11-15-2006*; 5:00 pm	No. 17	at (3) No. 1 SMU; Second Round	W 3–1	14–7–0	Westcott Field (1,012); Dallas, TX
11-18-2006*; 4:00 pm	No. 17	at No. 20 Old Dominion; Third Round	W 2–1	15–7–0	ODU Soccer Complex (1,481); Norfolk, VA
11-25-2006*; 7:00 pm	No. 17	at Northwestern; Quarterfinals	W 2–1	16–7–0	Harder Stadium (8,784); Santa Barbara, CA
NCAA College Cup
12-02-2006*; 11:30 am, ESPNU	No. 17	vs. (2) No. 2 Wake Forest; Semifinals	T 0–0; W 4–3 PK ^{2OT}	16–7–1	Hermann Stadium (6,314); St. Louis, MO
12-03-2006*; 12:00 pm, ESPN2	No. 17	vs. (8) No. 22 UCLA; National Championship	W 2–1	17–7–1	Hermann Stadium (5,948); St. Louis, MO
*Non-conference game. ^{#}Rankings from United Soccer Coaches. (#) Tournament seedings in parentheses.
