= 2018 Big West Conference men's soccer tournament =

- Classification: Division I
- Teams: 6
- Matches: 5
- Quarterfinals site: Higher seeds
- Semifinals site: Higher seeds
- Finals site: UC Riverside Soccer Stadium; Riverside, California
- Champions: UC Riverside (1st title)
- Winning coach: Tim Cupello (1st title)
- MVP: Daniel Aguiree (UC Riverside)
- Broadcast: BWTV

2018 Big West Conference men's soccer standings
	Conf.					Overall
Team	W		L		T	W		L		T
UC Irvine +	5	–	1	–	1	11	–	6	–	4
UC Santa Barbara	4	–	2	–	1	10	–	6	–	2
UC Riverside ‡	4	–	2	–	1	7	–	10	–	3
UC Davis	3	–	3	–	1	11	–	4	–	5
CSU Northridge	3	–	3	–	1	9	–	8	–	1
CSU Fullerton	2	–	3	–	2	7	–	6	–	8
Sacramento State	2	–	5	–	0	4	–	11	–	2
Cal Poly	1	–	5	–	1	5	–	9	–	2
‡ – 2018 Big West Tournament champion + – Invited to the 2018 NCAA Division I Men's Soccer Championship; As of November 29, 2018; Rankings from United Soccer Coaches

The 2018 Big West men's soccer tournament was the 11th edition of the tournament. The tournament decided the Big West Conference champion and representative into the 2018 NCAA Division I Men's Soccer Championship. The tournament began on October 31 and concluded on November 10.

The UC Riverside Highlanders won the championship, besting the UC Davies Aggies in penalty kicks after a scoreless draw. The title gives the Highlanders their first ever Big West Men's Soccer Tournament championship. Additionally, the Highlanders earned the conference's auto bid into the NCAA Tournament. Joining UC Riverside was the regular season champions, the UC Irvine Anteaters. The three-time defending champions Cal State Fullerton, were eliminated in the semifinals.

== Seeds ==
Seed	School	Conference	Tiebreaker
1	UC Irvine	5–1–1	
2	UC Riverside	4–2–1	UCR 1–0 vs. UCSB
3	UC Santa Barbara	4–2–1	UCSB 0–1 vs. UCR
4	Cal State Northridge	3–4–1	
5	UC Davis	4–3–1	
6	Cal State Fullerton	2–3–2	

== Bracket ==
First round Nov. 3
4	Cal State Northridge	2
5	UC Davis	3
3	UC Santa Barbara	1 (3)
6	Cal State Fullerton (pen.)	1 (5)

Semifinals; Nov. 7
1	UC Irvine	0 (5)
5	UC Davis (pen.)	0 (6)
2	UC Riverside (OT)	3
6	Cal State Fullerton	2

Final; Nov. 11
5	UC Davis	0 (2)
2	UC Riverside (pen.)	0 (4)

== Results ==
=== First round ===
October 31
7:00 p.m. PDT

No. 4 Cal State Northridge	2–3	No. 5 UC Davis
Flores 16'; Rodriguez 82'	Report	Schirmacher 31'; Anderson 74' (o.g.); Wright 79'

Matador Soccer Field, Northridge
Attendance: 273
Referee: Ricardo Salazar

October 31
7:00 p.m. PDT

No. 3 UC Santa Barbara	1–1 (a.e.t.)	No. 6 Cal State Fullerton
Tellechea 27'	Report	Pinzon 24'
Penalties
Candia (penalty scored); Michael (penalty scored); Tellechea (penalty missed); Mendez (penalty scored)	3–5	(penalty scored) Coronado; (penalty scored) Pinzon; (penalty scored) Bailey; (penalty scored) Juarez; (penalty scored) Goni

Harder Stadium, Isla Vista
Attendance: 467
Referee: Yadar Reyes

=== Semifinals ===
November 3
7:00 p.m. PDT

No. 1 UC Irvine	0–0 (a.e.t.)	No. 5 UC Davis
	Report
Penalties
Crisostomo (penalty scored); Falck (penalty scored); Leon (penalty missed); Canales (penalty scored); Gutierrez (penalty scored); Yamaguchi (penalty scored); Contreras (penalty missed)	5–6	(penalty scored) Velasquez; (penalty scored) Baringer; (penalty scored) Doherty; (penalty missed) Mejia; (penalty scored) Wood; (penalty scored) Haupt; (penalty scored) Fidler

Anteater Stadium, Irvine
Attendance: 524
Referee: Ian Anderson

November 3
7:00 p.m. PDT

No. 2 UC Riverside	3–2 (a.e.t.)	No. 6 Cal State Fullerton
Aguirre 45'; Keca 81'; Castaneda 99'	Report	McPhie 47'; Lokossou 66' (o.g.)

UC Riverside Soccer Stadium, Riverside
Attendance: 404
Referee: Alex Del Angel

=== Final ===
November 10
7:03 p.m. PST

No. 2 UC Riverside	0–0 (a.e.t.)	No. 5 UC Davis
	Report
Penalties
Aguirre (penalty scored); García (penalty scored); Badawiya (penalty scored); Castañeda (penalty scored)	4–2	(penalty scored) Haupt; (penalty missed) Mejía; (penalty missed) Baringer; (penalty scored) Doherty

UC Riverside Soccer Stadium, Riverside
Attendance: 880
Referee: Christopher Calderon

== Statistics ==
=== Goals ===
Rank	Player	College	Goals
1	(United States) Michael Flores	CSUN	1
1	(United States) Christian Pinzon	UCSB	1
1	(United States) Johnny Rodriguez	CSUN	1
1	(United States) Kaleb Schirmacher	UC Davis	1
1	(Spain) Ignacio Tellechea	UCSB	1
1	(United States) Justin Wright	UC Davis	1

=== Assists ===
Rank	Player	College	Assists
1	(United States) Jacob Rudolph	UC Davis	2
2	(France) Thibault Candia	UCSB	1
2	(United States) Samuel Dadzie	CSUN	1
2	(United States) Jake Haupt	UC Davis	1
2	(New Zealand) Ross McPhie	CSU Fullerton	1
2	(United States) Johnny Rodriguez	CSUN	1
2	(United States) Daniel Trejo	CSUN	1
