= Big West Conference men's soccer tournament =

- Sport: College soccer
- Conference: Big West Conference
- Number of teams: 4
- Format: Single-elimination tournament
- Current stadium: Campus Sites (Higher Seed)
- Played: 2008–present
- Last contest: 2026
- Current champion: Cal State Bakersfield (1st title)
- Most championships: UC Irvine (6)
- TV partner: ESPN+
- Official website: bigwest.org/msoc

The Big West men's soccer tournament is the conference championship tournament in soccer for the Big West Conference. The tournament has been held every year since 2008. It is a single-elimination tournament and seeding is based on regular season records. The winner, declared conference champion, receives the conference's automatic bid to the NCAA Division I men's soccer championship.

UC Irvine is the most winning team with 6 titles.

== Champions ==
The following is a list of Big West Conference tournament winners:

=== Finals ===
Key

- (1) – Title number
- a.e.t. – Match went to extra time
- p – Match decided by a penalty shootout after extra time
- – Winning team won regular season

=== Year by year ===
Ed.	Year	Champion	Score	Runner-up	Venue	MVP
1	2008	UC Irvine (1)	4–2	UC Santa Barbara	Anteater Stadium • Irvine, CA	(United States) Andrew Fontein, UC Irvine
2	2009	UC Irvine (2)	4–1	UC Santa Barbara	Anteater Stadium • Irvine, CA	(United States) Carlos Aguilar, UC Irvine
3	2010	UC Santa Barbara (1)	3–1	Cal State Fullerton	Harder Stadium • Santa Barbara, CA	(United States) Luis Silva, UCSB
4	2011	UC Irvine (3)	3–2 (a.e.t.)	UC Santa Barbara	Anteater Stadium • Irvine, CA	(United States) Miguel Ibarra, UC Irvine
5	2012	Cal State Northridge (1)	1–0	UC Davis	Aggie Field • Davis, CA	(Israel) Sagi Lev-Ari, CSUN
6	2013	UC Irvine (4)	1–0	Cal State Northridge	Anteater Stadium • Irvine, CA	(United States) Enrique Cardenas, UC Irvine
7	2014	Cal State Fullerton (1)	0–0 (3–2 p)	UC Irvine	Anteater Stadium • Irvine, CA	(United States) Jeff Salt, CSU Fullerton
8	2015	Cal State Fullerton (2)	1–0	UC Santa Barbara	Harder Stadium • Santa Barbara, CA	(United States) David Rodriguez, CSU
9	2016	Cal State Northridge (2)	2–1 (a.e.t.)	Cal State Fullerton	Matador Soccer Field • Northridge, CA	(United States) Kevin Marquez, CSUN
10	2017	Cal State Fullerton (3)	0–0 (4–3 p)	UC Davis	Aggie Field • Davis, CA	(France) Paul-Andre Guerin, UC Davis
11	2018	UC Riverside (1)	0–0 (4–2 p)	UC Davis	UC Soccer Stadium • Riverside, CA	(United States) Daniel Aguiree, UC Riverside
12	2019	UC Davis (1)	2–0	UC Santa Barbara	Aggie Field • Davis, CA	(United States) Adam Mickelson, UC Davis
–	2020	(Cancelled due to the COVID-19 pandemic)				
13	2021	UC Santa Barbara (1)	4–0	UC Irvine	Harder Stadium • Santa Barbara, CA	(Australia) Finn McBride, UCSB
14	2022	UC Riverside (1)	1-0	UC Santa Barbara	UC Soccer Stadium • Riverside, CA	(United States) Carlos Gonzalez, UC Riverside
15	2023	UC Irvine (5)	0–0 (8–7 p)	UC Davis	Anteater Stadium • Irvine, CA	(United States) Oscar Cervantes, UC Irvine
16	2024	UC Davis (2)	2–0	UC Santa Barbara	Harder Stadium • Santa Barbara, CA	(United States) Cason Goodman, UC Davis
17	2025	UC Irvine (6)	2–1	UC Santa Barbara	Harder Stadium • Santa Barbara, CA	(United States) Nolan DiCenzo, UC Irvine
18	2026	Cal State Bakersfield (1)	5–1	UC Santa Barbara	Harder Stadium • Santa Barbara, CA	(Norway) Filip Arras, Cal State Bakersfield

== Performance by school ==
=== Most championships ===
School	Titles	Winning years
UC Irvine	6	2008, 2009, 2011, 2013, 2023, 2025
Cal State Fullerton	3	2014, 2015, 2017
Cal State Northridge	2	2012, 2016
UC Santa Barbara	2	2010, 2021
UC Riverside	2	2018, 2022
UC Davis	2	2019, 2024
Cal State Bakersfield	1	2026
Total (all schools)	18	
