= 2022 Big West Conference men's soccer tournament =

- Classification: Division I
- Teams: 6
- Matches: 5
- Attendance: 3,678
- Site: Campus Sites (Higher Seed)
- Champions: UC Riverside (2nd title)
- Winning coach: Tim Cupello (2nd title)
- MVP: Carlos Gonzalez (UC Santa Barbara)
- Broadcast: ESPN+

2022 Big West Conference men's soccer standings
	Conf.					Overall
Team	W		L		T	W		L		T
UC Riverside‡	5	–	2	–	2	8	–	8	–	4
UC Santa Barbara	4	–	1	–	4	10	–	4	–	6
Cal State Northridge	5	–	3	–	1	9	–	6	–	4
UC Irvine	5	–	3	–	1	6	–	12	–	2
UC Davis	4	–	3	–	2	5	–	9	–	4
Sacramento State	4	–	5	–	0	9	–	8	–	2
Cal State Fullerton	3	–	3	–	3	8	–	6	–	5
UC San Diego ^{#}	4	–	5	–	0	8	–	8	–	2
Cal Poly	2	–	3	–	4	2	–	11	–	4
Cal State Bakersfield	0	–	8	–	1	2	–	13	–	2
‡ – 2022 Big West Tournament champion + – At-large invitation to the 2022 NCAA Tournament ^{#} – Ineligible for post-season (In transition); As of December 13, 2022; Rankings from United Soccer Coaches; Source: Big West

The 2022 Big West Conference men's soccer tournament was the postseason men's soccer tournament for the Big West Conference held on November 2 through 12, 2022. All rounds of the tournament were hosted at the higher seeds home stadium. The six-team single-elimination tournament consisted of three rounds based on seeding from regular season conference play. The defending champions were the UC Santa Barbara Gauchos. UC Santa Barbara was unable to defend its crown, falling to UC Riverside in the Final, 1–0. This was the second Big West tournament title for the UC Riverside program, both of which have come under head coach Tim Cupello. As tournament champions, UC Riverside earned the Big West's automatic berth into the 2022 NCAA Division I men's soccer tournament.

== Seeding ==
The top six teams in the regular season earned a spot in the 2022 tournament. Teams were seeded based on regular season conference record and tiebreakers were used to determine seedings of teams that finished with the same record. The first and second seeds earned a bye into the Semifinals, and hosted their Semifinal game. A tiebreaker was required to break a three-way tie between UC Irvine, Cal State Northridge, and UC Santa Barbara as all the teams ended the regular season with 16 points in conference play. The tiebreaker was head-to-head record among the three teams. UC Santa Barbara and UC Irvine were both 1–0–1 and Cal State Northridge was 0–2. Therefore, Cal State Northridge was the fourth seed, and UC Irvine and UC Santa Barbara moved on to a second tiebreaker, goal difference. UC Santa Barbara finished with +7, while UC Irvine finished with a -1 goal difference. Therefore, UC Santa Barbara was the second seed and UC Irvine was the third.

Seed	School	Conference Record	Points
1	UC Riverside	5–2–2	17
2	UC Santa Barbara	4–1–4	16
3	UC Irvine	5–3–1	16
4	Cal State Northridge	5–3–1	16
5	UC Davis	4–3–2	14
6	Sacramento State	4–5–0	12

== Bracket ==
First round Wednesday, Nov. 2
4	Cal State Northridge	3
5	UC Davis	2
3	UC Irvine	2
6	Sacramento State	0

Semifinals; Saturday, Nov. 5
1	UC Riverside	4
4	Cal State Northridge	1
2	UC Santa Barbara (a.e.t.)	2
3	UC Irvine	1

Final; Saturday, Nov. 12
1	UC Riverside	1
2	UC Santa Barbara	0

== Schedule ==
=== First Round ===
November 2	#3 UC Irvine	2–0	#6 Sacramento State	Irvine, CA
6:00 p.m. PT	Ashish Chattha 15'; Francesco Montanile (yellow card) 48'; Mario Anaya (yellow card) 66'; Diego Otoya 71'; Robert Mejia (yellow card) 80'; Team (yellow card) 80'	Report	(yellow card) 69' Genaro Alfaro; (yellow card) 86' Bryan Gutierrez	Stadium: Anteater Stadium; Attendance: 333; Referee: Rene Nunez; Assistant referees: Salma Perez; Trevor Wiseman; Fourth official: Bubba Barnett

November 2	#4 Cal State Northridge	3–2	#5 UC Davis	Northridge, CA
7:00 p.m. PT	AJ Johnson (yellow card) 38'; Edson Palos 40'; Jack Rhead 52'; Jamar Ricketts 53'; Marvin Arias (yellow card) 61'	Report	9' Ethan Hoard; (yellow card) 39' Cason Goodman; (yellow card) 41' Andy Velasquez; 87' Zachary Batchelder	Stadium: Matador Soccer Field; Attendance: 577; Referee: Frank Anderson; Assistant referees: Salvador Reyes; Irving Navarro; Fourth official: Adrian Gonzalez

=== Semifinals ===
November 5	#1 UC Riverside	4–1	#4 Cal State Northridge	Riverside, CA
7:00 p.m. PT	Noah Lopez 5'; Armando Ibarra 42', 89'; Brendan Clark 78'; Adrian Meade-Tatum (yellow card) 81'	Report	40' Enrique Pineda; (yellow card) 46' (yellow-red card) 79' AJ Johnson; (yellow card) 78' David Diaz; (yellow card) 89' Kanata Furutani	Stadium: UC Riverside Soccer Stadium; Attendance: 708; Referee: Sean Wright; Assistant referees: Steve Lane; Wale Animashuan; Fourth official: Magic Berenji

November 5	#2 UC Santa Barbara	2–1 (a.e.t.)	#3 UC Irvine	Santa Barbara, CA
7:00 p.m. PT	Nemo Philipp 28'; Timon Windisch (yellow card) 96'; UC Irvine Own Goal 109'	Report	57' Robert Mejia; (yellow card) 109' Luke Pruter	Stadium: Harder Stadium; Attendance: 925; Referee: Frank Anderson; Assistant referees: Cameron Blanchard; Abdel Hakeem Wakil; Fourth official: Shahin Torosian

=== Final ===
November 12	#1 UC Riverside	1–0	#2 UC Santa Barbara	Riverside, CA
7:00 p.m. PT	Luka Lukic 43'; Aleksander Vukovic (yellow card) 56'	Report	(yellow card) 42' (yellow-red card) 90' Team; (yellow card) 42' Henry Davies; (yellow card) 81' Lucas Gonzalez	Stadium: UC Riverside Soccer Stadium; Attendance: 1,135; Referee: Ian Anderson; Assistant referees: Cameron Blanchard; Frank Anderson; Fourth official: Vincent Brizzolara

== Statistics ==
=== Goalscorers ===
There were 16 goals scored in 5 matches, for an average of 3.2 goals per match (as of November 12, 2022).

2 goals

- Armando Ibarra – UC Riverside

1 goal

- Edson Palos – Cal State Northridge
- Enrique Pineda – Cal State Northridge
- Jamar Ricketts – Cal State Northridge
- Jack Rhead – Cal State Northridge
- Zachary Batchelder – UC Davis
- Ethan Hoard – UC Davis
- Ashish Chattha – UC Irvine
- Robert Mejia – UC Irvine
- Diego Otoya – UC Irvine
- Brendan Clark – UC Riverside
- Noah Lopez – UC Riverside
- Luka Lukic – UC Santa Barbara
- Nemo Philipp – UC Santa Barbara

1 own goal

- UC Irvine (against UC Santa Barbara)
