= 2021 Big West Conference men's soccer tournament =

- Classification: Division I
- Teams: 6
- Matches: 5
- Site: Campus Sites (Higher Seed)
- Champions: UC Santa Barbara (2nd title)
- Winning coach: Tim Vom Steeg (2nd title)
- MVP: Finn Ballard McBride (UC Santa Barbara)
- Broadcast: ESPN+

2021 Big West Conference men's soccer standings
	Conf.					Overall
Team	W		L		T	W		L		T
UC Santa Barbara ‡	6	–	1	–	2	12	–	5	–	4
UC Irvine	6	–	1	–	2	8	–	8	–	4
Cal Poly	5	–	1	–	3	7	–	6	–	4
Cal State Bakersfield	5	–	4	–	0	6	–	10	–	1
UC Davis	4	–	4	–	1	9	–	10	–	1
UC Riverside	3	–	4	–	2	9	–	7	–	3
Sacramento State	3	–	4	–	2	5	–	10	–	3
Cal State Northridge	3	–	5	–	1	4	–	13	–	1
UC San Diego ^{#}	2	–	7	–	0	5	–	11	–	0
Cal State Fullerton	1	–	7	–	1	3	–	11	–	3
‡ – 2021 Big West Tournament champion + – At-large invitation to the 2021 NCAA tournament ^{#} – Ineligible for post-season (In transition); As of December 14, 2021; Rankings from United Soccer Coaches; Source: Big West

The 2021 Big West Conference men's soccer tournament was the postseason men's soccer tournament for the Big West Conference held on November 3 through 12, 2021. All rounds of the tournament were hosted at the higher seeds home stadium. The six-team single-elimination tournament consisted of three rounds based on seeding from regular season conference play. The defending champions were the UC Davis Aggies. The Aggies won the tournament in 2019 and are classified as the defending champions because there was no tournament held in 2020 due to the COVID-19 pandemic. UC Davis was unable to defend its crown, falling to UC Santa Barbara in the Semifinals. UC Santa Barbara would go on to win the title, defeating UC Irvine 4–0 in the final. This was the second Big West tournament title for the UC Santa Barbara program, both of which have come under head coach Tim Vom Steeg. As tournament champions, UC Santa Barbara earned the Big West's automatic berth into the 2021 NCAA Division I men's soccer tournament.

== Seeding ==
The top six teams in the regular season earned a spot in the tournament. Teams were seeded based on regular season conference record and tiebreakers were used to determine seedings of teams that finished with the same record. The first and second seeds earned a bye into the Semifinals, and hosted their Semifinal game. A tiebreaker was required to determine the first and second seeds after UC Santa Barbara and UC Irvine finished the regular season with identical 6–1–2 records. Their regular season match ended in a tie and the teams had identical goal differential, and therefore goals scored in conference play was used as the tiebreaker. UC Santa Barbara won the tiebreaker and was awarded the first seed and UC Irvine was the second seed. UC Riverside and Sacramento State tied for sixth in the regular season standings with identical 3–4–2 records. UC Riverside earned the sixth and final seed by beating Sacramento State 2–0 in the team's regular season matchup.

Seed	School	Conference Record	Points
1	UC Santa Barbara	6–1–2	20
2	UC Irvine	6–1–2	20
3	Cal Poly	5–1–3	18
4	Cal State Bakersfield	5–4–0	15
5	UC Davis	4–4–1	13
6	UC Riverside	3–4–2	11

== Bracket ==
First round Wednesday, Nov. 3
4	Cal State Bakersfield	1
5	UC Davis	3
3	Cal Poly	0
6	UC Riverside	1

Semifinals; Saturday, Nov. 6
1	UC Santa Barbara (a.e.t.)	1
5	UC Davis	0
2	UC Irvine (pen.)	2 (4)
6	UC Riverside	2 (2)

Final; Saturday, Nov. 12
1	UC Santa Barbara	4
2	UC Irvine	0

== Schedule ==
=== First Round ===
November 3, 2021	#4 Cal State Bakersfield	1–3	#5 UC Davis	Bakersfield, CA
6:00 p.m. PT	Tom Shepherd 19'; Niall Owens (yellow card) 20'; Peter McKiernan (yellow card) 87'	Report	33', 64' Robert Mejia; 37' Maximilian Arfsten; (yellow card) 61' Jake Haupt; (yellow card) 78' Team	Stadium: Main Soccer Field; Attendance: 785; Referee: Rene Nunez; Assistant referees: Ivan De Christofaro; Kevin Zelaya; Fourth official: Richard Heron

November 3, 2021	#3 Cal Poly	0–1	#6 UC Riverside	San Luis Obispo, CA
7:00 p.m. PT	Carlos Arce-Hurtado (yellow card) 54'; Jacob Glass (yellow card) 83'	Report	54' Leopoldo Hernandez; (yellow card) 54' Carlos Osorio-Castro	Stadium: Alex G. Spanos Stadium; Attendance: 612; Referee: Ian Anderson; Assistant referees: Gustavo Barrinetos; John Pranjic; Fourth official: Adam Zarrin

=== Semifinals ===
November 6, 2021	#1 UC Santa Barbara	1–0 (a.e.t.)	#5 UC Davis	Santa Barbara, CA
7:00 p.m. PT	Nemo Philipp 107'	Report	(yellow card) 51' Emmanuel Doherty	Stadium: Harder Stadium; Attendance: 1,267; Referee: Bernhard Hosu; Assistant referees: Ivan De Cristofaro; Salma Perez; Fourth official: Luis Gutierrez

November 6, 2021	#2 UC Irvine	2–2 (a.e.t.) (4–2 p)	#6 UC Riverside	Irvine, CA
7:00 p.m. PT	UC Riverside Own Goal 67' (o.g.); Mario Anaya (yellow card) 71'; Francesco Montanile 77'	Report	(yellow card) 21' Federico Ucar; (yellow card) 40' Freymar Omarsson; 72' Jonick Pineda; 86', (yellow card) 87' Roberto Garcia-Vargas; (yellow card) 106' Adolfo Magana	Stadium: Anteater Stadium; Attendance: 566; Referee: Sean Wright; Assistant referees: Trevor Rappleye; Jorge Partida; Fourth official: Yoel Miller
	Penalties
	Lawrence Yamaguchi (penalty scored); Jake Means (penalty scored); Beto Alvarenga (penalty scored); Victor Sandsmark-Evensen (penalty scored)		(penalty missed) Leopoldo Hernandez; (penalty missed) Brendan Clark; (penalty scored) Oscar Penate; (penalty scored) Josue Varela

=== Final ===
November 12, 2021	#1 UC Santa Barbara	4–0	#2 UC Irvine	Santa Barbara, CA
7:00 p.m. PT	Ramses Martinez 15'; Salvador Aguilar 44'; Henry Davies 54'; Finn Ballard McBride 66'	Report	(yellow card) 21' (yellow-red card) 45' Oscar Cervantes; (yellow card) 44' Gordon Botterill; (yellow card) 45' Team; (yellow card) 54' Beto Alvarenga	Stadium: Harder Stadium; Attendance: 2,209; Referee: Ronald Hoffman; Assistant referees: Trevor Wiseman; Trevor Rappleye; Fourth official: Magic Berenji

== Statistics ==
=== Goalscorers ===
There were 14 goals scored in 5 matches, for an average of 2.8 goals per match (as of November 12, 2021).

2 goals

- Robert Mejia – UC Davis

1 goal

- Tom Shepherd – Cal State Bakersfield
- Maximilian Arfsten – UC Davis
- Francesco Montanile – UC Irvine
- Roberto Garcia-Vargas – UC Riverside
- Leopoldo Hernandez – UC Riverside
- Jonick Pineda – UC Riverside
- Salvador Aguilar – UC Santa Barbara
- Henry Davies – UC Santa Barbara
- Ramses Martinez – UC Santa Barbara
- Finn Ballard McBride – UC Santa Barbara
- Nemo Philipp – UC Santa Barbara

1 own goal

- UC Riverside (against UC Irvine)
