= 2024 Big West Conference men's soccer tournament =

- Classification: Division I
- Teams: 6
- Matches: 5
- Attendance: 6,899
- Site: Campus Sites (Higher Seed)
- Champions: UC Davis (2nd title)
- Winning coach: Dwayne Shaffer (2nd title)
- MVP: Cason Goodman (UC Davis)
- Broadcast: ESPN+

2024 Big West Conference men's soccer standings
	Conf.					Overall
Team	W		L		T	W		L		T
Cal Poly	4	–	1	–	4	7	–	4	–	8
UCSB +	4	–	2	–	3	12	–	5	–	5
UC Irvine	4	–	3	–	2	8	–	8	–	3
UC Davis ‡	4	–	3	–	2	10	–	6	–	6
Cal State Bakersfield	4	–	3	–	2	7	–	6	–	4
Cal State Fullerton	3	–	2	–	4	7	–	6	–	7
UC Riverside	3	–	2	–	4	5	–	6	–	5
UC San Diego	3	–	5	–	1	4	–	9	–	5
Sacramento State	3	–	6	–	0	6	–	10	–	2
CSUN	0	–	5	–	4	2	–	8	–	7
‡ – 2024 Big West tournament champion + – At-large invitation to the 2024 NCAA tournament; As of December 17, 2024; Rankings from United Soccer Coaches; Source: Big West

The 2024 Big West Conference men's soccer tournament was the postseason men's soccer tournament for the Big West Conference held on November 6 through 15, 2024. All rounds of the tournament were hosted at the higher seeds home stadium. The six-team single-elimination tournament consisted of three rounds based on seeding from regular season conference play. The defending champions were the UC Irvine Anteaters. UC Irvine was unable to defend its crown as the third seed, falling to UC Santa Barbara in the Semifinals, 2–1. Fourth seed UC Davis would go on to win the tournament defeating UC Santa Barbara 2–0 in the Final. This was the second Big West tournament title for the UC Davis program, and their first since 2019. The title was also the second for head coach Dwayne Shaffer. As tournament champions, UC Davis earned the Big West's automatic berth into the 2024 NCAA Division I men's soccer tournament.

== Seeding ==
The top six teams in the regular season earned a spot in the 2024 tournament. Teams were seeded based on regular season conference record and tiebreakers were used to determine seedings of teams that finished with the same record. The first and second seeds earned a bye into the Semifinals, and hosted their Semifinal game. There was a three-way tie for the third, fourth, and fifth seeds in the tournament as Cal State Bakersfield, UC Davis, and UC Irvine all finished with identical 4–3–2 regular season records. UC Irvine defeated both UC Davis and Cal State Bakersfield during the regular season and is therefore the third seed. UC Davis defeated Cal State Bakersfield during the regular season and is therefore the fourth seed, while Cal State Bakersfield is the fifth seed. Another tiebreaker was required for the sixth and final seed in the tournament as Cal State Fullerton and UC Riverside both finished with 3–2–4 regular season records. The two teams tied their regular season match-up 3–3, so a second tiebreaker was required. Cal State Fullerton earned the sixth seed by virtue of goal difference in league games. Cal State Fullerton finished with a +5 goal difference, while UC Riverside finished with a 0 goal difference.

Seed	School	Conference Record	Points
1	Cal Poly	4–1–4	16
2	UC Santa Barbara	4–2–3	15
3	UC Irvine	4–3–2	14
4	UC Davis	4–3–2	14
5	Cal State Bakersfield	4–3–2	14
6	Cal State Fullerton	3–2–4	10

== Bracket ==
First round Wednesday, Nov. 6
4	UC Davis	2
5	Cal State Bakersfield	1
3	UC Irvine	1
6	Cal State Fullerton	0

Semifinals; Saturday/Sunday, Nov. 9/10
1	Cal Poly	1 (4)
4	UC Davis (pen.)	1 (5)
2	UC Santa Barbara	2
3	UC Irvine	1

Final; Friday, Nov. 15
4	UC Davis	2
2	UC Santa Barbara	0

== Schedule ==
=== First Round ===
November 6, 2024	#4 UC Davis	2–1	#5 Cal State Bakersfield	Davis, CA
1:00 p.m. PST	Carson Hammond (yellow card) 42'; Zachary Neuls 70'; Team (yellow card) 72'; Keegan Walwyn-Bent 84'	Report	(yellow card) 39', (goal) 72' (pen.) Bryson Hankins; (yellow card) 81' Bilal Mihoubi	Stadium: Aggie Soccer Field; Attendance: 383

November 6, 2024	#3 UC Irvine	1–0	#6 Cal State Fullerton	Irvine, CA
6:00 p.m. PST	Team (yellow card) 65'; Misael Gonzalez 80'	Report	(yellow card) 19' Julian Borja; (yellow card) 90' Erick Serrano	Stadium: Anteater Stadium; Attendance: 573; Referee: Trevor Wiserman; Assistant referees: Edwar Hernandez; Wale Animashuan; Fourth official: Adrian Gonzalez

=== Semifinals ===
November 9, 2024	#2 UC Santa Barbara	2–1	#3 UC Irvine	Santa Barbara, CA
7:00 p.m. PST	Calle Mollerberg (yellow card) 36'; Isaiah Barber (yellow card) 43', (goal) 82'; Andrew Kamienski 60'	Report	58' Isaiahs Gutierrez	Stadium: Harder Stadium; Attendance: 1,523; Referee: Brandon Stevis; Assistant referees: Israel Fernandez; John Ashton; Fourth official: Joseph Salinas

November 10, 2024	#1 Cal Poly	1–1 (a.e.t.) (4–5 p)	#4 UC Davis	San Luis Obispo, CA
2:00 p.m. PST	Nico Baltazar 26'; Diego Guerra (yellow card) 73'; Finn Linas (yellow card) 88'; Quinn Mahoney (yellow card) 99'	Report	53' Zachary Neuls; (yellow card) 73' Lucas Fernandez-Kim; (yellow card) 106' Andrew Dutra	Stadium: Mustang Field; Attendance: 1,582; Referee: Michael Gebreslassie; Assistant referees: Abdu Razzaq Juma; Abdelhady Abdelkader; Fourth official: Victor Mba
	Penalties
	Diego Guerra (penalty missed); Ashton Alonge (penalty scored); Nathan Colley (penalty scored); Parker Owens (penalty scored); Nico Baltazar (penalty scored); Conner Lisenbee (penalty missed)		(penalty scored) Carson Goodman; (penalty missed) Kevin Welch; (penalty scored) Lucas Fernandez-Kim; (penalty scored) Luke Goodman; (penalty scored) Keegan Walwyn-Bent; (penalty scored) Zack Lillington

=== Final ===
November 15, 2024	#2 UC Santa Barbara	0–2	#4 UC Davis	Santa Barbara, CA
7:00 p.m. PST	Ocean Salari (yellow card) 57'; Filip Basili (yellow card) 85'	Report	20', 44' Cason Goodman; (yellow card) 62' Lucas Fernandez-Kim	Stadium: Harder Stadium; Attendance: 2,838; Referee: Bernhard Hosu; Assistant referees: Kristin Patterson; Edwar Hernandez; Fourth official: Irving Navarro

== Statistics ==
=== Goalscorers ===
There were 11 goals scored in 5 matches, for an average of 2.2 goals per match (as of November 15, 2024).

2 goals

- Cason Goodman – UC Davis
- Zachary Neuls – UC Davis

1 goal

- Nico Baltazar – Cal Poly
- Isaiah Barber – UC Santa Barbara
- Misael Gonzalez – UC Irvine
- Isaiahs Gutierrez – UC Irvine
- Bryson Hankins – Cal State Bakersfield
- Andrew Kamienski – UC Santa Barbara
- Keegan Walwyn-Bent – UC Davis
