= 2025 Big West Conference men's soccer tournament =

- Classification: Division I
- Teams: 6
- Matches: 5
- Site: Campus Sites (Higher Seed)
- Champions: UC Irvine (6th title)
- Winning coach: Yossi Raz (2nd title)
- MVP: Nolan DiCenzo (UC Irvine)
- Broadcast: ESPN+

2025 Big West Conference men's soccer standings
	Conf.					Overall
Team	W		L		T	W		L		T
UCSB †	4	–	0	–	5	7	–	5	–	8
UC Irvine †‡	4	–	0	–	5	11	–	4	–	6
Cal Poly †	5	–	2	–	2	9	–	6	–	5
Cal State Fullerton	5	–	3	–	1	8	–	6	–	6
UC Davis	4	–	3	–	2	4	–	9	–	6
UC San Diego	2	–	2	–	5	2	–	9	–	7
Cal State Bakersfield	3	–	4	–	2	3	–	11	–	3
UC Riverside	2	–	6	–	1	4	–	9	–	4
CSUN	1	–	5	–	3	6	–	6	–	6
Sacramento State	1	–	6	–	2	2	–	12	–	4
† – Conference champion ‡ – 2025 Big West tournament champion + – At-large invitation to the 2025 NCAA tournament; As of December 6, 2025; Rankings from United Soccer Coaches; Source: Big West

The 2025 Big West Conference men's soccer tournament was the postseason men's soccer tournament for the Big West Conference held on November 5 through November 14, 2025. All rounds of the tournament were hosted at the higher seeds home stadium. The six-team single-elimination tournament consisted of three rounds based on seeding from regular season conference play. The defending champions were the UC Davis Aggies. UC Davis was unable to defend its crown as the fifth seed, falling to the first seed UC Santa Barbara in the Semifinals, 3–2. The UC Irvine Anteaters won their sixth title defeating UC Santa Barbara 2–1, and earned the Big West's automatic berth into the 2025 NCAA Division I men's soccer tournament.

== Seeding ==
The top six teams in the regular season earned a spot in the 2025 tournament. Teams were seeded based on regular season conference record and tiebreakers were used to determine seedings of teams that finished with the same record. The first and second seeds earn a bye into the Semifinals, and hosted their Semifinal game. There was a three-way tie for the first, second, and third seeds in the tournament as UC Santa Barbara, UC Irvine, and Cal Poly all finished with 17 points in the conference regular season records. UC Santa Barbara defeated Cal Poly and tied UC Irvine during the regular season and is therefore the first seed. UC Irvine tied both UC Santa Barbara and Cal Poly during the regular season and is therefore the second seed, while Cal Poly is the third seed. Another tiebreaker was required for the sixth and final seed in the tournament as UC San Diego and Cal State Bakersfield both finished with 11 points in the conference regular season records. UC San Diego received the sixth seed by virtue of their 2–1 win over Cal State Bakersfield during the regular season.

Seed	School	Conference Record	Points
1	UC Santa Barbara	4–0–5	17
2	UC Irvine	4–0–5	17
3	Cal Poly	5–2–2	17
4	Cal State Fullerton	5–3–1	16
5	UC Davis	4–3–2	14
6	UC San Diego	2–2–5	11

== Bracket ==
First round Wednesday, Nov. 5
4	Cal State Fullerton	0 (4)
5	UC Davis (pen.)	0 (5)
3	Cal Poly	2
6	UC San Diego	0

Semifinals; Saturday, Nov. 8
1	UC Santa Barbara	3
5	UC Davis	2
2	UC Irvine	1
3	Cal Poly	0

Final; Friday, Nov. 14
1	UC Santa Barbara	1
2	UC Irvine	2

== Schedule ==
=== First Round ===
November 5, 2024	#4 Cal State Fullerton	0–0 (a.e.t.) (4–5 p)	#5 UC Davis	Fullerton, CA
7:00 p.m. PST	Avery Huggins (yellow card) 63'	Report	(yellow card) 55' Carson Hammond	Stadium: Titan Stadium; Attendance: 664; Referee: Brandon Stevis; Assistant referees: Edwar Hernandez, Tomik Baghramian; Fourth official: Michael Matson
	Penalties
	Fernando Valenzuela (penalty scored); Jose de la Torre (penalty missed); Mario Carlos (penalty scored); Lucien Wa Bwanda (penalty scored); Ulises Grado (penalty scored)		(penalty scored) Cason Goodman; (penalty scored) Gavin House; (penalty scored) Chase Tanon; (penalty scored) Luke Goodman; (penalty scored) Zack Lillington

November 5, 2024	#3 Cal Poly	2–0	#6 UC San Diego	San Luis Obispo, CA
7:00 p.m. PST	Finn Linas 53'; Jackson Miller (yellow card) 62'; Team 71'; Keagan Rhoades (yellow card) 84'	Report	(yellow card) 14' Adam Hillis; (yellow card) 48' Woody Brown; (red card) 60' Adam Hillis	Stadium: Mustang Field; Attendance: 459; Referee: Matthew Tanious; Assistant referees: Isai Baltezar, Bernard Abousleiman; Fourth official: Eder Alvarez

=== Semifinals ===
November 8, 2024	#2 UC Irvine	1–0	#3 Cal Poly	Irvine, CA
6:00 p.m. PST	Brady Treinen (yellow card) 15'; Marcus Lee (yellow card) 27'; Braden Ferreira (yellow card) 46'; Hunny Yoo (yellow card) 65'; Gage Lyons 83'	Report	Jackson Miller (yellow card) 61'; Benji Jimenez (yellow card) 85'	Stadium: Anteater Stadium; Attendance: 681; Referee: Michael Zapata; Assistant referees: Wale Aminashaun, Emmanuel Padilla; Fourth official: Felix Granados

November 8, 2024	#1 UC Santa Barbara	3–2	#5 UC Davis	Santa Barbara, CA
7:00 p.m. PST	Thomas Noordegraaf (yellow card) 22'; Calle Mollerberg 57', (yellow card) 90'; Kaden Standish 60'; Dominick Phanco 69'	Report	38' Ben Elkins; (yellow card) 42' Zack Lillington; (yellow card) 57' Team; 81' Cason Goodman; (yellow card) 90' Ian Ngonethong	Stadium: Harder Stadium; Attendance: 1,697; Referee: Bernhard Hosu; Assistant referees: James Abi-Abdallah, Abdel Hakeem Wakil; Fourth official: Bernard Abousleiman

=== Final ===
November 14, 2024	#1 UC Santa Barbara	1–2	#2 UC Irvine	Santa Barbara, CA
7:00 p.m. PST	(yellow card) 22' Jack Middleton; (yellow card) 26' Drew Kamienski; 65' Buba Fofanah; (yellow card) 66' Calle Mollerberg; (red card) 81' Drew Kamienski	Report	26' Travis Babineau; 45' Hunny Yoo	Stadium: Harder Stadium; Attendance: 1,868; Referee: Servando Berna; Assistant referees: Tomik Baghramian, Christian Lara; Fourth official: Rene Nunez

== Statistics ==
=== Goalscorers ===
There were 11 goals scored in 5 matches, for an average of 2.2 goals per match.

1 goal

- Cal Poly Men's Soccer Team
- Travis Babineau
- Ben Elkins
- Buba Fofanah
- Cason Goodman
- Finn Linas
- Gage Lyons
- Calle Mollerberg
- Dominick Phanco
- Kaden Standish
- Hunny Yoo

== All-Tournament team ==
Player	Team
**2025 Big West Men's Soccer All-Tournament team**
Nico Baltazar	Cal Poly
Jackson Miller	Cal Poly
Luke Goodman	UC Davis
Gavin House	UC Davis
Travis Babieau	UC Irvine
**Nolan DiCenzo**	UC Irvine
Isaac Powell	UC Irvine
Brady Treinen	UC Irvine
Owen Beninga	UC Santa Barbara
Steinar Bjornsson	UC Santa Barbara
Kaden Standish	UC Santa Barbara

MVP in Bold
