= 2023 Big West Conference men's soccer tournament =

- Classification: Division I
- Teams: 6
- Matches: 5
- Attendance: 4,595
- Site: Campus Sites (Higher Seed)
- Champions: UC Irvine (5th title)
- Winning coach: Yossi Raz (1st title)
- MVP: Oscar Cervantes (UC Irvine)
- Broadcast: ESPN+

2023 Big West Conference men's soccer standings
	Conf.					Overall
Team	W		L		T	W		L		T
Cal State Fullerton	6	–	2	–	1	12	–	5	–	3
UC Irvine ‡	5	–	3	–	1	9	–	7	–	4
UC Santa Barbara	4	–	3	–	2	10	–	8	–	2
UC Davis	4	–	4	–	1	9	–	7	–	4
Cal Poly	3	–	3	–	3	5	–	8	–	4
UC Riverside	3	–	3	–	3	3	–	10	–	5
Cal State Bakersfield	3	–	4	–	2	7	–	5	–	5
UC San Diego ^{#}	3	–	5	–	1	4	–	11	–	3
CSUN	2	–	3	–	4	4	–	6	–	8
Sacramento State	1	–	4	–	4	4	–	10	–	4
‡ – 2023 Big West tournament champion + – At-large invitation to the 2023 NCAA tournament ^{#} – Ineligible for post-season (In transition); As of December 12, 2023; Rankings from United Soccer Coaches; Source: Big West

The 2023 Big West Conference men's soccer tournament was the postseason men's soccer tournament for the Big West Conference held on November 1 through 11, 2023. All rounds of the tournament were hosted at the higher seeds home stadium. The six-team single-elimination tournament consisted of three rounds based on seeding from regular season conference play. The defending champions were the UC Riverside Highlanders. UC Riverside was unable to defend its crown, falling to UC Santa Barbara in the First Round, 3–2. Second seed UC Irvine would go on to win the tournament in a penalty shoot-out over UC Davis in the Final. This was the fifth Big West tournament title for the UC Irvine program, and their first since 2013. The title was the first for head coach Yossi Raz. As tournament champions, UC Irvine earned the Big West's automatic berth into the 2023 NCAA Division I men's soccer tournament.

== Seeding ==
The top six teams in the regular season earned a spot in the 2023 tournament. Teams were seeded based on regular season conference record and tiebreakers were used to determine seedings of teams that finished with the same record. The first and second seeds earned a bye into the Semifinals, and hosted their Semifinal game. A tiebreaker was required to determine the fifth and sixth seeds for the tournament as Cal Poly and UC Riverside both finished with identical 3–3–3 conference records. The teams played to a 1–1 draw during the regular season, so the second tiebreaker of goal differential was used. Cal Poly had a +5 goal differential and UC Riverside had a +1 goal differential. Therefore, Cal Poly earned the fifth seed, while UC Riverside was the sixth seed.

Seed	School	Conference Record	Points
1	Cal State Fullerton	6–2–1	19
2	UC Irvine	5–3–1	16
3	UC Santa Barbara	4–3–2	14
4	UC Davis	4–4–1	13
5	Cal Poly	3–3–3	12
6	UC Riverside	3–3–3	12

== Bracket ==
First round Wednesday, Nov. 1
4	UC Davis	1
5	Cal Poly	0
3	UC Santa Barbara	3
6	UC Riverside	2

Semifinals; Saturday, Nov. 4
1	Cal State Fullerton	1
4	UC Davis	2
2	UC Irvine (a.e.t.)	2
3	UC Santa Barbara	1

Final; Saturday, Nov. 11
4	UC Davis	0 (7)
2	UC Irvine (pen.)	0 (8)

== Schedule ==
=== First Round ===
November 1	#4 UC Davis	1–0	#5 Cal Poly	Davis, CA
3:00 p.m. PT	Chase Tanon 81'	Report	(yellow card) 80' Diego Guerra	Stadium: Aggie Soccer Field; Attendance: 407; Referee: Turan Ozdemir; Assistant referees: Peter Hanson; Robert Vincze; Fourth official: Neal Rodgers

November 1	#3 UC Santa Barbara	3–2	#6 UC Riverside	Santa Barbara, CA
7:00 p.m. PT	Lucas Gonzalez (yellow card) 4'; Team (yellow card) 23'; Nemo Philipp (yellow card) 37'; Nicholas Hald Willumsen 54'; Eddie Villeda (yellow card) 67'; Alexis Ledoux 78' (pen.); Salvador Aguilar 86'	Report	23', (yellow card) 78' Noah Lopez; (yellow card) 31' Chrisitan Ceja; 46' Armando Ibarra Jr.; (yellow card) 78' Jackson D'Alessandro; (yellow card) 78' Aleksandar Vukovic; (yellow card) 78' Team; (yellow card) 90' Luka Lukic; (red card) 90' Jona Martinez; (red card) 90' Jason Garcia	Stadium: Harder Stadium; Attendance: 923; Referee: William Hoffman; Assistant referees: Israel Fernandez; Steve Lane; Fourth official: Matthew Tanious

=== Semifinals ===
November 4	#2 UC Irvine	2–1	#3 UC Santa Barbara	Irvine, CA
6:00 p.m. PT	Eddy Berumen 68'; Samuel Atiye 79'; Christian Gomez (yellow card) 88'	Report	(yellow card) 22' Nalu Mack; 56' Nemo Philipp; (yellow card) 58' Alex Ledoux	Stadium: Anteater Stadium; Attendance: 809; Referee: Brandon Stevis; Assistant referees: William Delgado; Abdu Razzaq Juma; Fourth official: Irving Navarro

November 4	#1 Cal State Fullerton	1–2 (a.e.t.)	#4 UC Davis	Fullerton, CA
7:00 p.m. PT	Matthias Heiland (yellow card) 4'; Jalen Belong (yellow card) 86'; Erick Serrano (yellow card) 90'; Jorge Quintero 90'	Report	(yellow card) 2', (goal) 96' Cason Goodman; 49' Scott Buie	Stadium: Titan Stadium; Attendance: 1,047; Referee: Rene Nunez; Assistant referees: Israel Fernandez; Rafael Bonilla; Fourth official: Felix Granados

=== Final ===
November 11	#2 UC Irvine	0–0 (a.e.t.) (8–7 p)	#4 UC Davis	Irvine, CA
6:00 p.m. PT	Ricardo Ibarra (yellow card) 101'; Luke Pruter (yellow card) 110'		(yellow card) 43' Zack Lillington; (yellow card) 83' Keegan Walwyn-Bent; (yellow card) 96' Jason Hsu	Stadium: Anteater Stadium; Attendance: 1,409; Referee: Bernhard Hosu; Assistant referees: Adrian Gonzalez; Israel Fernandez; Fourth official: Randy Hoffman
	Penalties
	Mario Anaya (penalty scored); Jake Means (penalty missed); Mathias Winum (penalty scored); Juan Barragan-Manzo (penalty scored); Agaton Pourshahidi (penalty scored); Rafael Espinoza (penalty scored); Nolan DiCenzo (penalty scored); Josh Kenworthy (penalty scored); Kellan Barry (penalty scored)		(penalty scored) Cason Goodman; (penalty scored) Lucas Fernandez-Kim; (penalty scored) Keegan Walwyn-Bent; (penalty missed) Ryan Dieter; (penalty scored) Jason Hsu; (penalty scored) Ethan Hoard; (penalty scored) Kevin Welch; (penalty scored) Luke Goodman; (penalty missed) Hayden Carlson

== Statistics ==
=== Goalscorers ===
There were 12 goals scored in 5 matches, for an average of 2.4 goals per match (as of November 11, 2023).

1 goal

- Jorge Quintero – Cal State Fullerton
- Scott Buie – UC Davis
- Cason Goodman – UC Davis
- Chase Tanon – UC Davis
- Samuel Atiye – UC Irvine
- Eddy Berumen – UC Irvine
- Armando Ibarra Jr. – UC Riverside
- Noah Lopez – UC Riverside
- Salvador Aguilar – UC Santa Barbara
- Nicholas Hald Wilumsen – UC Santa Barbara
- Alexis Ledoux – UC Santa Barbara
- Nemo Philipp – UC Santa Barbara
