= 2018 Big West Conference men's soccer season =

- League: NCAA Division I
- Sport: Soccer
- Duration: August 24, 2018 – November 9, 2018
- Teams: 8

2019 MLS SuperDraft

Regular Season

Big West Conference men's soccer seasons
- ← 2017 2019 →

2018 Big West Conference men's soccer standings
	Conf.					Overall
Team	W		L		T	W		L		T
UC Irvine +	5	–	1	–	1	11	–	6	–	4
UC Santa Barbara	4	–	2	–	1	10	–	6	–	2
UC Riverside ‡	4	–	2	–	1	7	–	10	–	3
UC Davis	3	–	3	–	1	11	–	4	–	5
CSU Northridge	3	–	3	–	1	9	–	8	–	1
CSU Fullerton	2	–	3	–	2	7	–	6	–	8
Sacramento State	2	–	5	–	0	4	–	11	–	2
Cal Poly	1	–	5	–	1	5	–	9	–	2
‡ – 2018 Big West Tournament champion + – Invited to the 2018 NCAA Division I Men's Soccer Championship; As of November 29, 2018; Rankings from United Soccer Coaches

The 2018 Big West Conference men's soccer season is the 36th consecutive season of men's college soccer in the Big West Conference under the 2018 NCAA Division I men's soccer season. The season will feature eight teams, where one is an affiliate member of the conference. Sacramento State will compete from the Big Sky Conference. Colleges in the Big West will begin competition on August 24, 2018, and conclude on November 9, 2018 after the 2018 NCAA Division I Men's Soccer Championship. Prior to the NCAA Division I Tournament Championship, there will be a postseason conference tournament held at the university with the highest seed in the postseason conference tournament, where the winner is guaranteed to represent the Big West in the NCAA Division I Tournament. Hawaii and Long Beach State have defunct programs in this season.

== Rankings ==
Legend
Increase in ranking
Decrease in ranking
Not ranked previous week
Selected for NCAA Tournament
Key: No. – Ranking, RV – Received votes, NR – Not ranked

	Pre	Wk 1	Wk 2	Wk 3	Wk 4	Wk 5	Wk 6	Wk 7	Wk 8	Wk 9	Wk 10	Wk 11	Wk 12	Wk 13	Wk 14	Final
Cal Poly	NR	NR	NR													
CSU Fullerton	RV	NR	NR													
CSU Northridge	NR	NR	RV													
Sacramento State	NR	NR	NR													
UC Davis	NR	NR	17													
UC Irvine	NR	RV	RV													
UC Riverside	NR	NR	NR													
UC Santa Barbara	NR	RV	NR													

== Matches ==
- Note: Results updated after the last game of each day in WAC competition, and games are added/updated weekly after each rankings release
- Rankings are from the United Soccer Coaches Poll

=== Non–conference ===
Week One – August 24, 2018 to August 30, 2018

24 August 2018	UC Davis	0–0	Omaha	Omaha, Nebraska
4:00 p.m. PST				Stadium: Caniglia Field

24 August 2018	Sacramento State	0–0	Portland	Portland, Oregon
5:30 p.m. PST				Stadium: Merlo Field

24 August 2018	CSU Northridge	0–0	San Francisco	San Francisco, California
7:00 p.m. PST				Stadium: Negoesco Stadium

24 August 2018	Fresno Pacific	0–0	Cal Poly	San Luis Obispo, California
7:00 p.m. PST				Stadium: Janssen Field

24 August 2018	UC Riverside	0–0	Loyola Marymount	Los Angeles, California
7:00 p.m. PST				Stadium: Sullivan Field

24 August 2018	UC Irvine	0–0	San Diego	San Diego, California
7:00 p.m. PST				Stadium: Torero Stadium

24 August 2018	St. John's	0–0	UC Santa Barbara	Santa Barbara, California
7:30 p.m. PST				Stadium: Harder Stadium

26 August 2018	CSU Northridge	0–0	San Jose State	San Jose, California
4:00 p.m. PST				Stadium: Spartan Soccer Complex

26 August 2018	UC Davis	0–0	Creighton	Omaha, Nebraska
5:00 p.m. PST				Stadium: Morrison Stadium

26 August 2018	UC Riverside	0–0	UC Santa Barbara	Santa Barbara, California
7:00 p.m. PST				Stadium: Harder Stadium

27 August 2018	UC Irvine	0–0	UCF	Orlando, Florida
4:00 p.m. PST				Stadium: UCF Soccer Stadium

27 August 2018	CSU Fullerton	0–0	Missouri State	Springfield, Missouri
				Stadium: Allison Stadium

27 August 2018	Sacramento State	0–0	Oregon State	Corvallis, Oregon
6:00 p.m. PST				Stadium: Valley Stadium

27 August 2018	Cal Poly	0–0	Gonzaga	Spokane, Washington
7:00 p.m. PST				Stadium: Gonzaga Soccer Field

== Records against other conferences ==
- Note: Conferences eligible for the 2018 NCAA Division I Men's Soccer Championship only

Conference	Record
America East	0–0
American	0–0
Atlantic 10	0–0
ACC	0–0
Atlantic Sun	0–0
Big East	0–0
Big South	0–0
Big Ten	0–0
Big West	0–0
CAA	0–0
C–USA	0–0
Horizon	0–0
Ivy League	0–0
MAAC	0–0
MAC	0–0
Missouri Valley	0–0
Northeast	0–0
Pac–12	0–0
Patriot	0–0
Southern	0–0
Summit	0–0
Sun Belt	0–0
WCC	0–0
WAC	0–0
