= Matador Field =

Baseball venue in Northridge, California, United States

Robert J. Hiegert Field
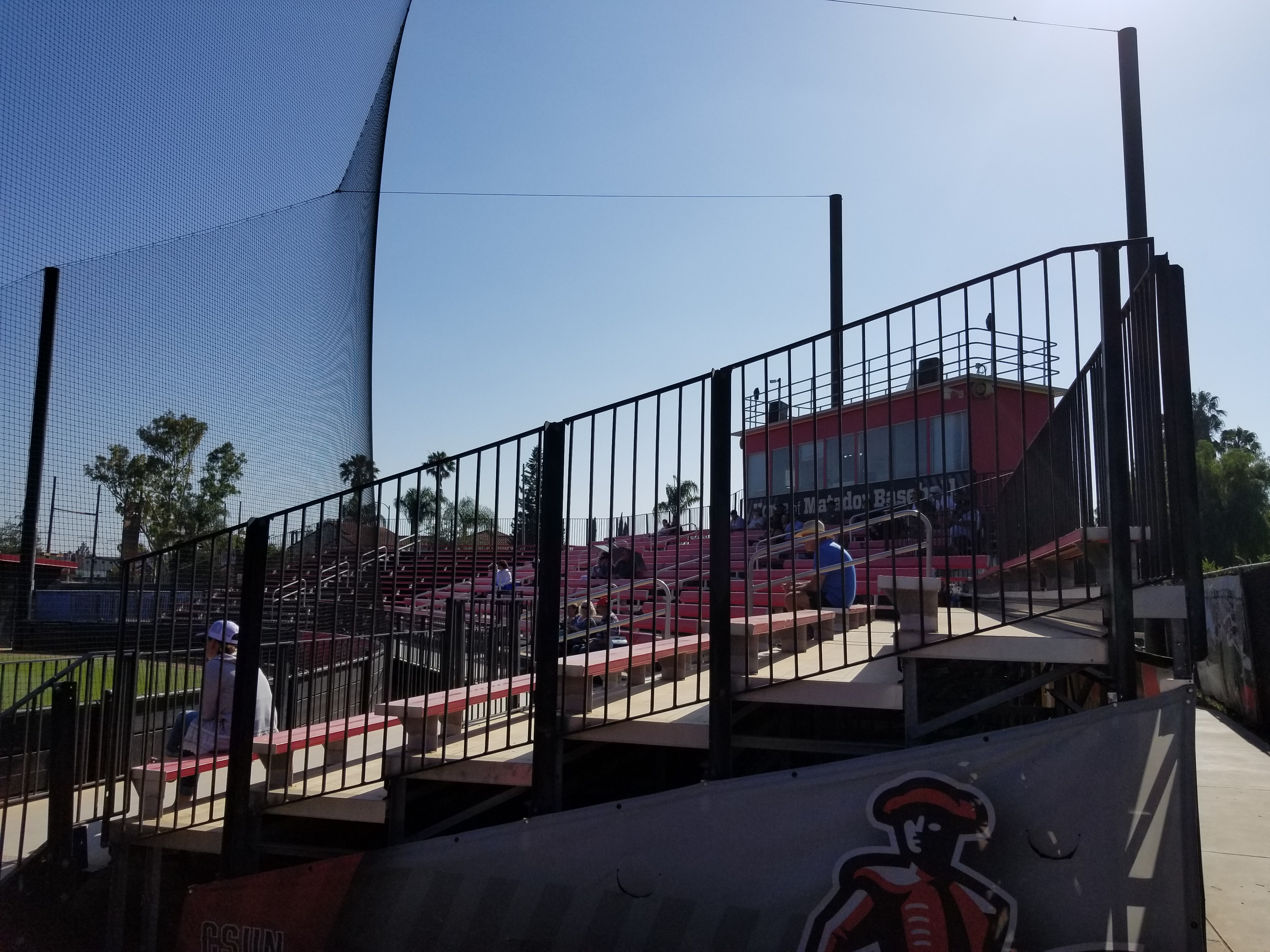
- Interactive map of Robert J. Hiegert Field
- Location: Northridge, CA
- Coordinates: 34.245105°N 118.526747°W
- Owner: California State University, Northridge
- Capacity: 1,200
- Surface: Bermuda grass
- Scoreboard: Yes
- Field size: 325 ft. (LF); 335 ft. (RF); 375 ft. (gaps); 400 ft. (CF)

Construction
- Built: 1961
- Opened: March 4, 1961
- Renovated: 1975, 1981, 1993, 1996

Tenants
- Cal State Northridge Matadors baseball (1961–present)

Matador Field is a baseball venue located on the campus of Cal State Northridge in Los Angeles, California, United States, more specifically in the San Fernando Valley district of Northridge. It is home to the Cal State Northridge Matadors baseball team, a member of the Division I Big West Conference. The venue was opened on March 4, 1961, with the Matadors losing 10–8 to Claremont-Mudd. The facility has a capacity of 1,200.

== Renovations ==
In 1975, a three-year renovation process began which saw a new infield, scoreboard, batting cages, fencing, bleachers, and press box installed. A clubhouse adjoining the Matador dugout was constructed in 1981. A new infield was installed in 1993, followed by a new scoreboard and video replay screen over the right field fence in 1996.

In 2017, new renovation plans were revealed with a total cost of $15 Million. The stadium will expand its capacity and overhaul its entire look including: new concession stands, new entry way honoring the Matadors' baseball history, an expanded hitting facility, state of the art team building, stair back seating with premium areas, new restrooms, children's play area, and grass berm seating.

A new led video board was installed in 2024, 7 years after the initial plan to overhaul the dated stadium.

For the 2025 season, CSUN renamed Matador Field after long-time coach and two-time national champion Bob Hiegert. The field will also have lights for the first time in 2025 after being one of the last Division-1 fields without lights on the west coast.

== Gallery ==
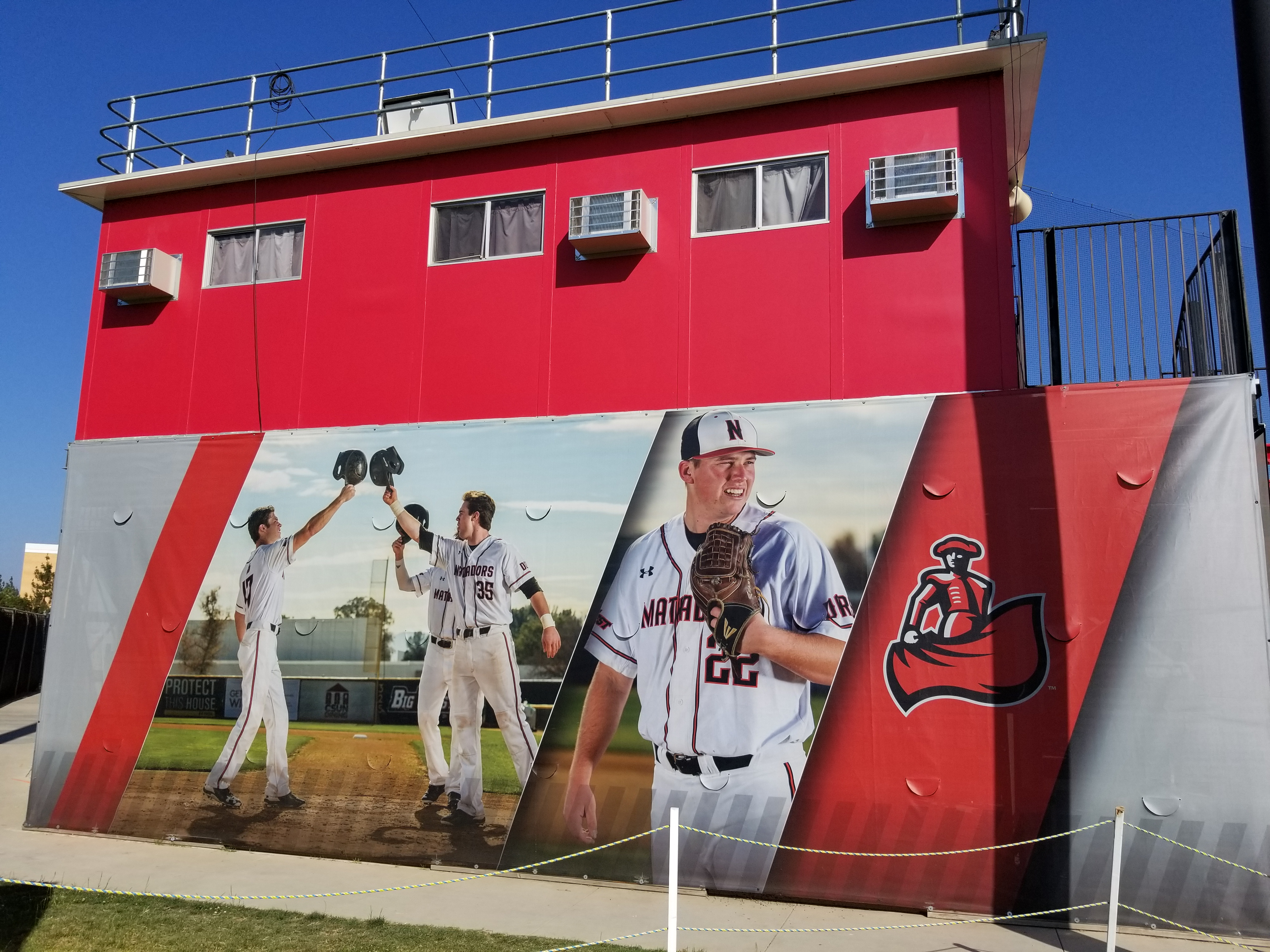
Matador Field press box

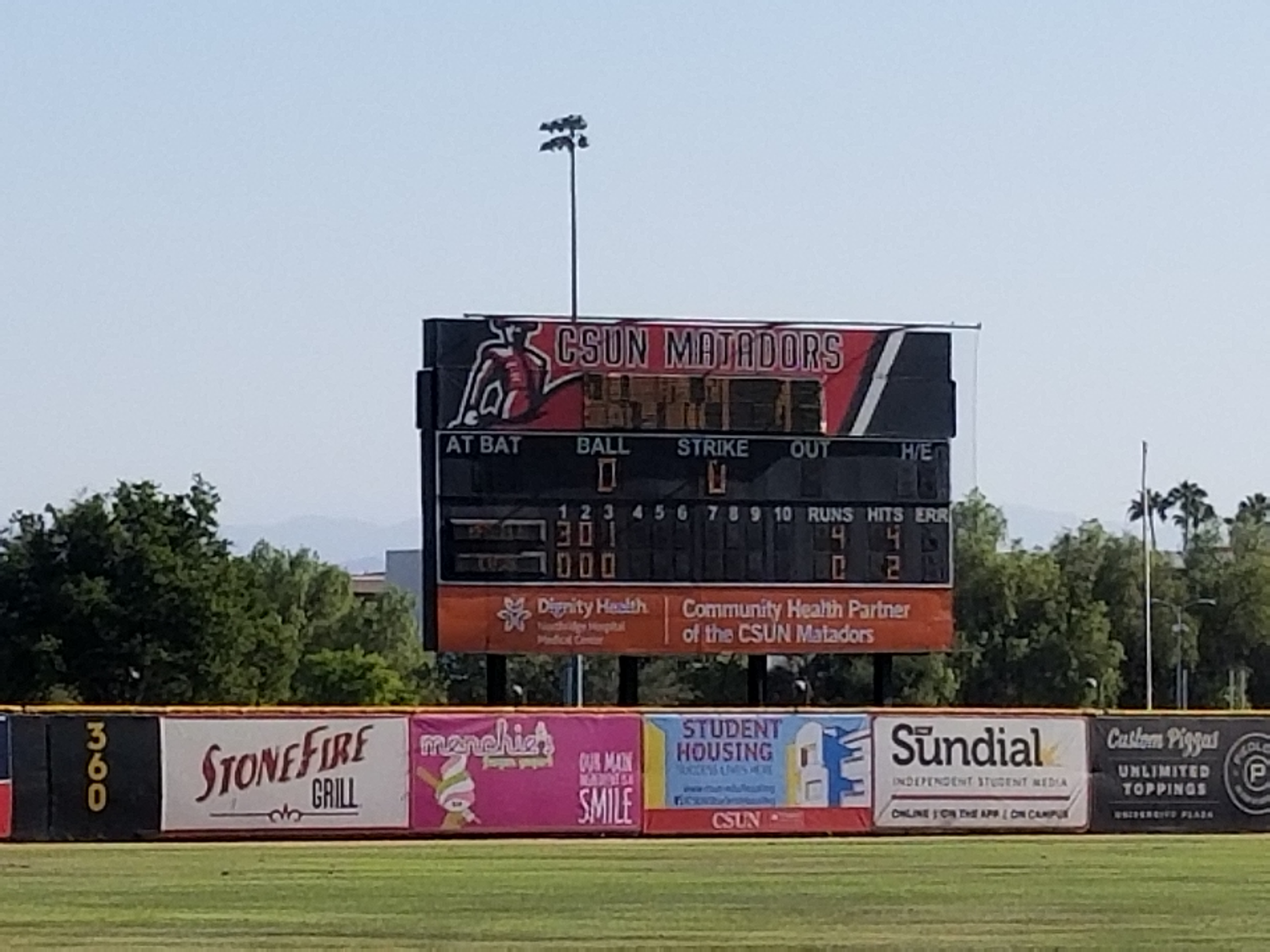
Matador Field scoreboard

== See also ==
- List of NCAA Division I baseball venues
