= Bryan Byrne =

Bryan Byrne may refer to:

- Bryan Byrne (footballer)
- Bryan Byrne (rugby union)

== See also ==
- Brian Byrne (disambiguation)
