= UC Riverside Highlanders =

Intercollegiate sports teams of the University of California, Riverside

- University: University of California, Riverside
- Nickname: Highlanders
- NCAA: Division I
- Conference: Big West (primary); Mountain Pacific Sports Federation (indoor track & field); Pac-12 (men's soccer)
- Athletic director: Wes Mallette
- Location: Riverside, California
- Varsity teams: 15
- Basketball arena: Student Recreation Center Arena
- Baseball stadium: Riverside Sports Complex
- Softball stadium: Amy S. Harrison Field
- Soccer stadium: UC Riverside Soccer Stadium
- Other venues: Ag/Ops Course; Amy S. Harrison Field; SRC Tennis Courts; UC Riverside Track Facility
- Colors: Blue and gold
- Mascot: Scotty Highlander
- Website: gohighlanders.com
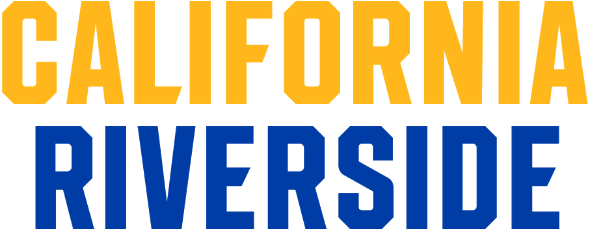

The UC Riverside Highlanders represent the University of California, Riverside (UCR) in Riverside, California in 15 men's and women's intercollegiate athletics. The Highlanders compete in NCAA Division I; they are members of the Big West Conference.

In 1954, UCR's founding class adopted the name "Highlanders", reflecting the campus's high altitude. After the student body passed a referendum to move to Division I competition in 1998, the bear mascot, formerly called "Scotty", was professionally redesigned to look more ferocious. The new mascot featured a half-blue face in homage to William Wallace, the subject of the movie Braveheart. In line with the Scottish motif, UCR assembles a bagpipe band made up of students and staff who play at graduation and other campus events. The blue and gold tartan worn by the pipe band and the mascot is a registered trademark of the University of California. For the women's basketball team's first appearance at the NCAA Tournament in 2006, UCR sent 22 members of the pipe band to play at halftime.

In 2020, the future of UCR's sports program was placed into doubt, as the university's leadership were considering cutting the entire athletics department in response to financial strain caused by the COVID-19 pandemic. However, in May 2021, the university announced that they had decided against eliminating athletics and would instead continue sponsoring all sports at the Division I level.

== Sports sponsored ==
| Men's sports | Women's sports |
|---|---|
| Baseball | Basketball |
| Basketball | Cross country |
| Cross country | Golf |
| Golf | Soccer |
| Soccer | Softball |
| Tennis | Tennis |
| Track and field^{1} | Track and field^{1} |
| | Volleyball |
^{1} – includes both indoor and outdoor

=== Baseball ===
The UC Riverside Highlanders baseball team is the varsity intercollegiate baseball team of the University of California, Riverside. The team is a member of the Big West Conference, which is part of the NCAA Division I. UC Riverside's first baseball team was fielded in 1958. The team plays its home games at the 2,500-seat Riverside Sports Complex.

=== Basketball ===
==== Men's basketball ====
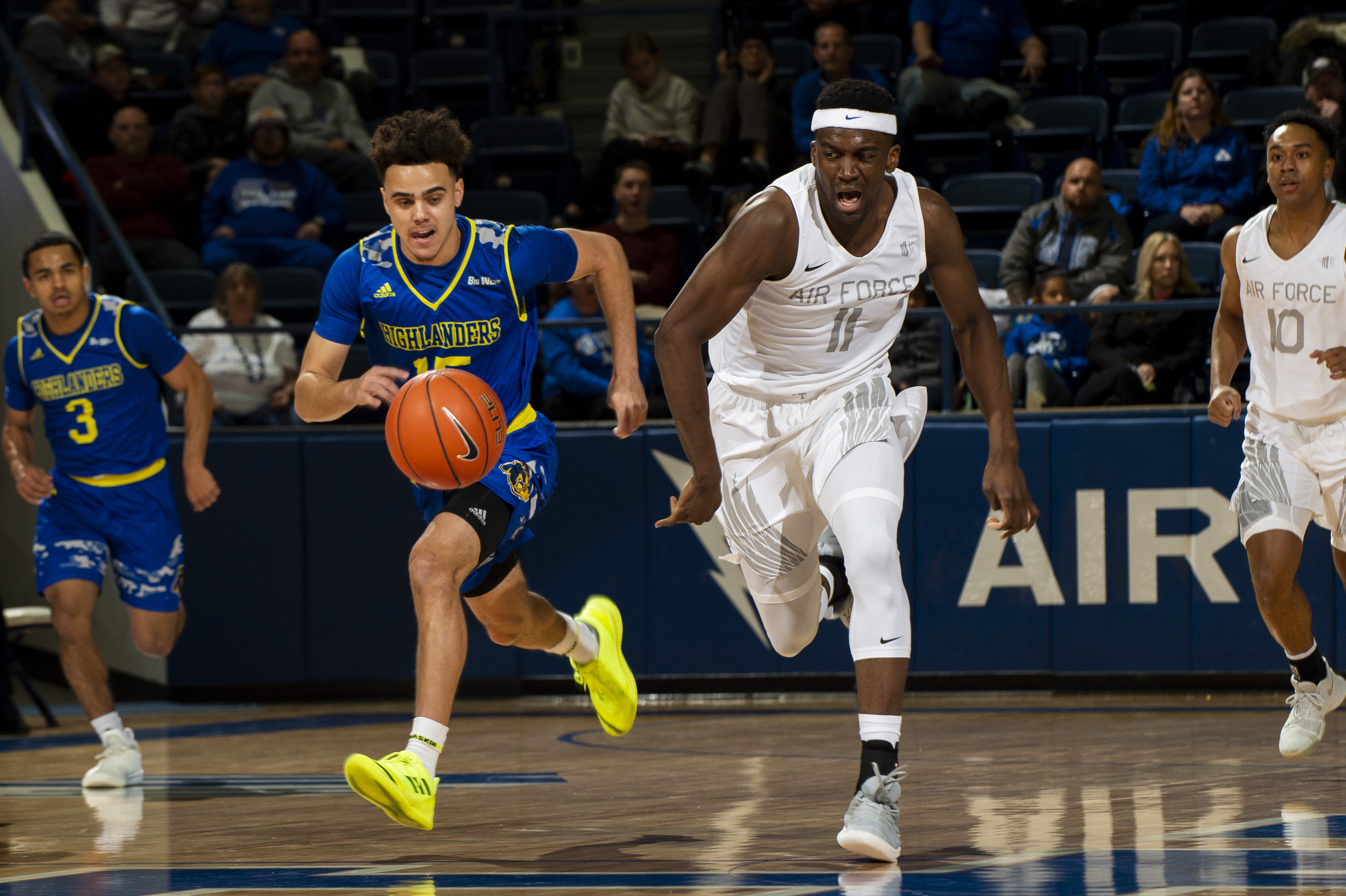
A game between the Highlanders and Air Force Falcons men's basketball teams in 2018

The UC Riverside Highlanders men's basketball team represents the University of California, Riverside. The school's team currently competes in the Big West Conference, which is part of the NCAA Division I. UC Riverside's first men's basketball team was fielded during the 1958–59 season. The team plays its home games at the 3,168-seat Student Recreation Center Arena.

==== Women's basketball ====
The UC Riverside Highlanders women's basketball team represents the University of California, Riverside. The school's team currently competes in the Big West Conference, which is part of the NCAA Division I. UC Riverside's first women's basketball team was fielded during the 1977–78 season. The team plays its home games at the 3,168-seat Student Recreation Center Arena.

=== Soccer ===
==== Men's soccer ====
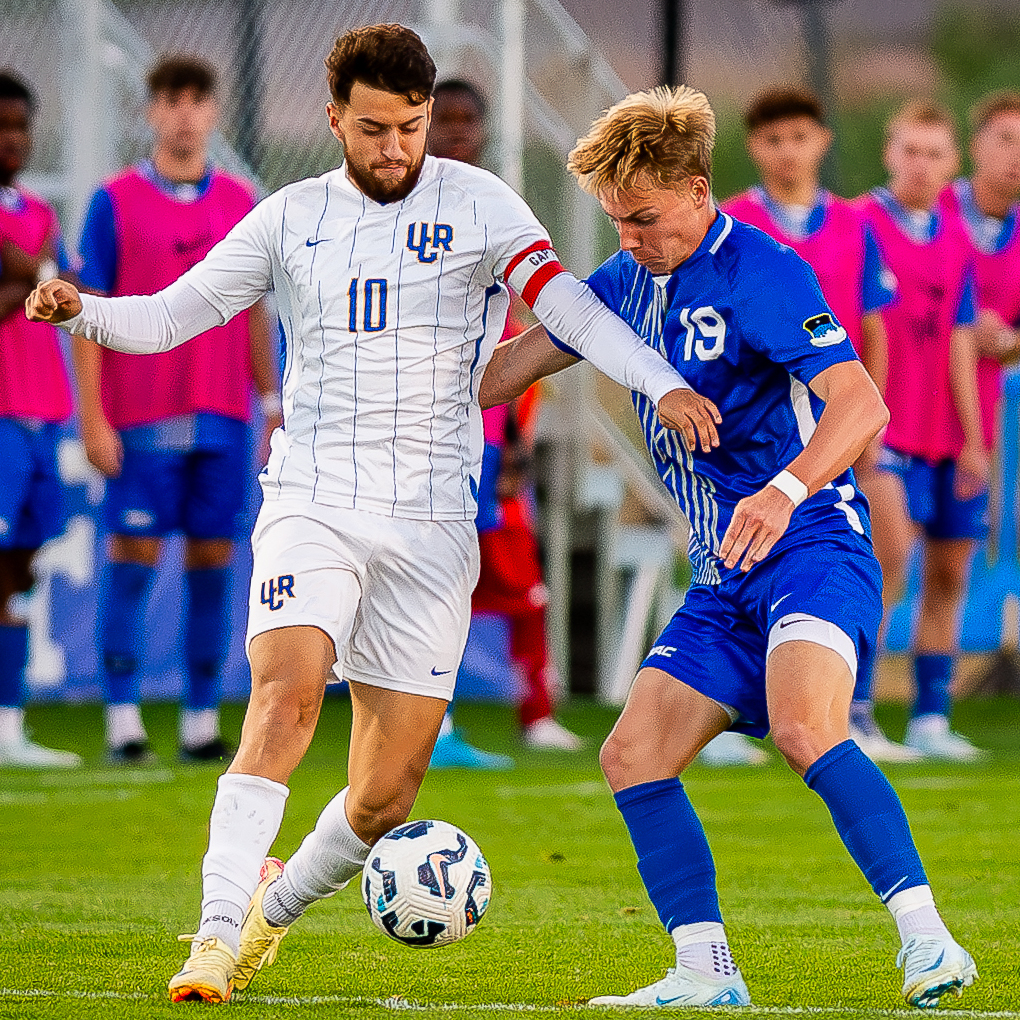
The UC Riverside men's soccer team plays against Air Force in 2024

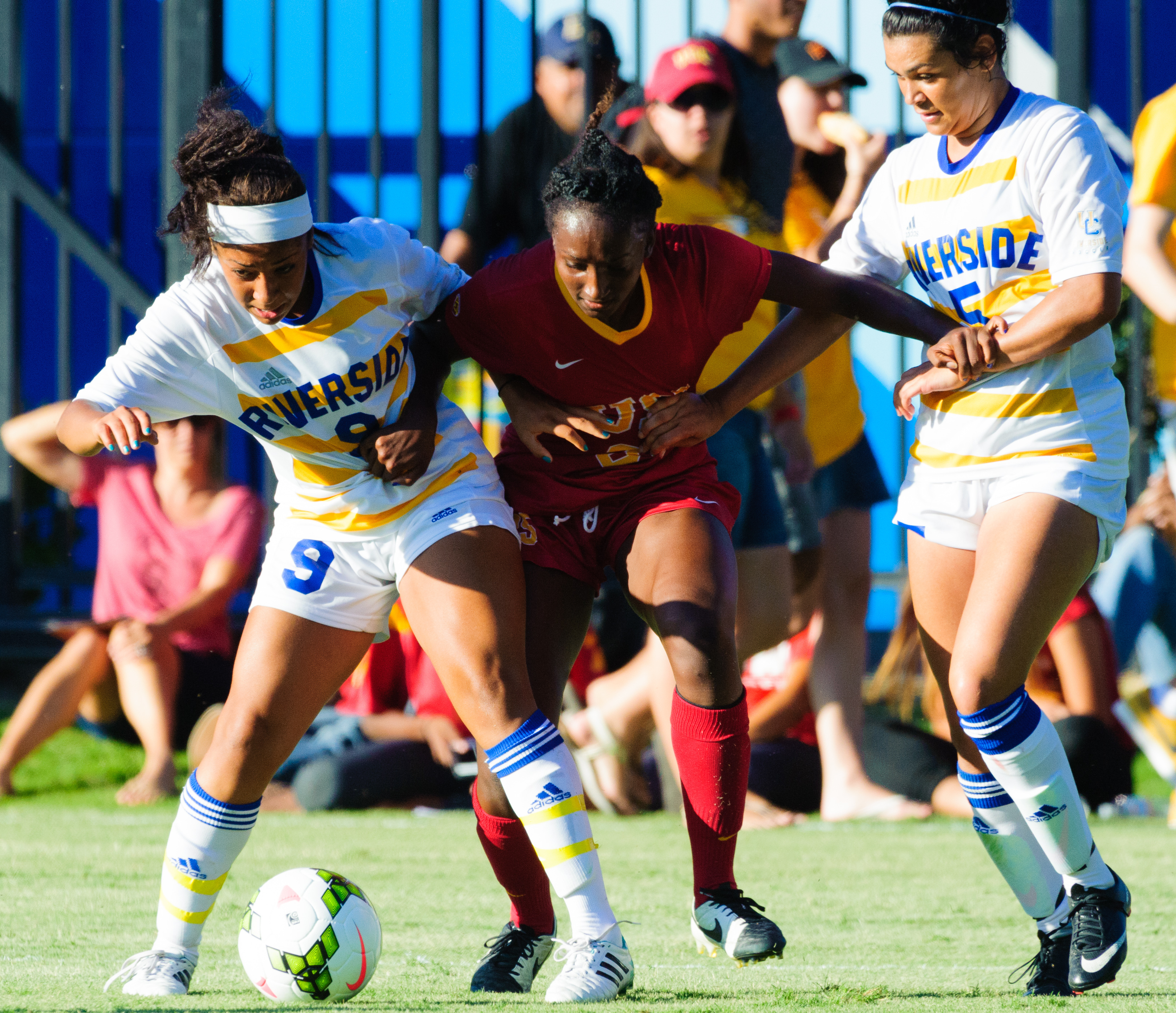
The UC Riverside women's soccer team plays against the USC Trojans in 2014

The team was established in 1965, and has been competing in the Big West Conference since 2002, where it has won two tournament championships (in 2018 and 2022, when the team also won the regular season).

The men's soccer squad have an NCAA Division I Tournament record of 0–2 through two appearances.

==== Women's soccer ====
The UC Riverside Highlanders women's soccer team have an NCAA Division I Tournament record of 0–1 through one appearance.

In 2005 the women's soccer team competed in the first round of the NCAA tournament. In 2007, UCR's baseball team won their first Big West championship and reached the Division I postseason for the second time since 2003, and the cross country team sent its first two athletes to the national championships.

| Year | Round | Opponent | Result |
|---|---|---|---|
| 2005 | First Round | Colorado | L 0–1 |

== Former varsity sports ==
=== Football ===
The UC Riverside Highlanders football team played from 1955 until the program was disbanded in 1975. The team played at Highlander Stadium. The team won two CCAA championships before the sport was discontinued because of low attendance and in anticipation of the impact of Title IX regulations.

== Club teams ==
Non-varsity student sports clubs that compete with other area universities include the Rugby Football Club, established in 2006, which plays in the Southern California Rugby Football Union. The karate program is provided through the UC Riverside Recreation Center's Leisure Line classes. The classes are provided by top-of-the-line USA Shotokan karate team coaches from the American JKA Karate Association, an association that has been in the city for over 40 years. It is one of the largest collegiate programs in the United States, that take competitors to local, national and international competitions. A Men's and Women's Club Soccer team also competes in the West Coast Soccer Association.

UCR also has a boxing club called Highlander Gloves, which competes in the USIBA College National Championships. Highlander Gloves trains at a local gym named the Raincross Boxing Academy that was founded by a member of Highlander Gloves. UCR's Highlander Gloves has produced numerous national champions and consistently ranks within the top five schools in the USIBA National Championships. The club was founded by UC Riverside student Celia Miranda in partnership with Det. Mario Dorado of the Riverside Police Foundation to create a free non-profit program that provides tutoring and mentorship to at-risk students in the Riverside area. This program operates independently of the university, as the gym is located off-campus. Raincross Boxing academy has notably been the home for notable fighters including WBC and WBA Flyweight Unified World Champion Ricardo Rafael Sandoval and World title challengers Josesito López and Chris Arreola.

== Championships ==
=== Appearances ===
The UC Riverside Highlanders competed in the NCAA Tournament across 6 active sports (2 men's and 4 women's) 11 times at the Division I level.

- Baseball (2): 2003, 2007
- Women's basketball (3): 2006, 2007, 2010
- Men's soccer (1): 2018, 2022
- Women's soccer (1): 2005
- Women's indoor track and field (2): 2009, 2016
- Women's outdoor track and field (1): 2009

=== Team ===
UC Riverside has never won a national championship at the NCAA Division I level.

UC Riverside won 4 national championships at the NCAA Division II level.

- Baseball (2): 1977, 1982
- Women's volleyball (2): 1982, 1986

Below is one national championship that was not bestowed by the NCAA:

- Women's volleyball – Division II (1): 1977 (AIAW)

=== Individual ===
UC Riverside had 1 Highlander win an NCAA individual championship at the Division I level.

NCAA individual championships
| Order | School year | Athlete(s) | Sport | Source |
|---|---|---|---|---|
| 1 | 2015–16 | Vesta Bell | Women's indoor track and field | |

At the NCAA Division II level, UC Riverside garnered 11 individual championships.

== Facilities ==
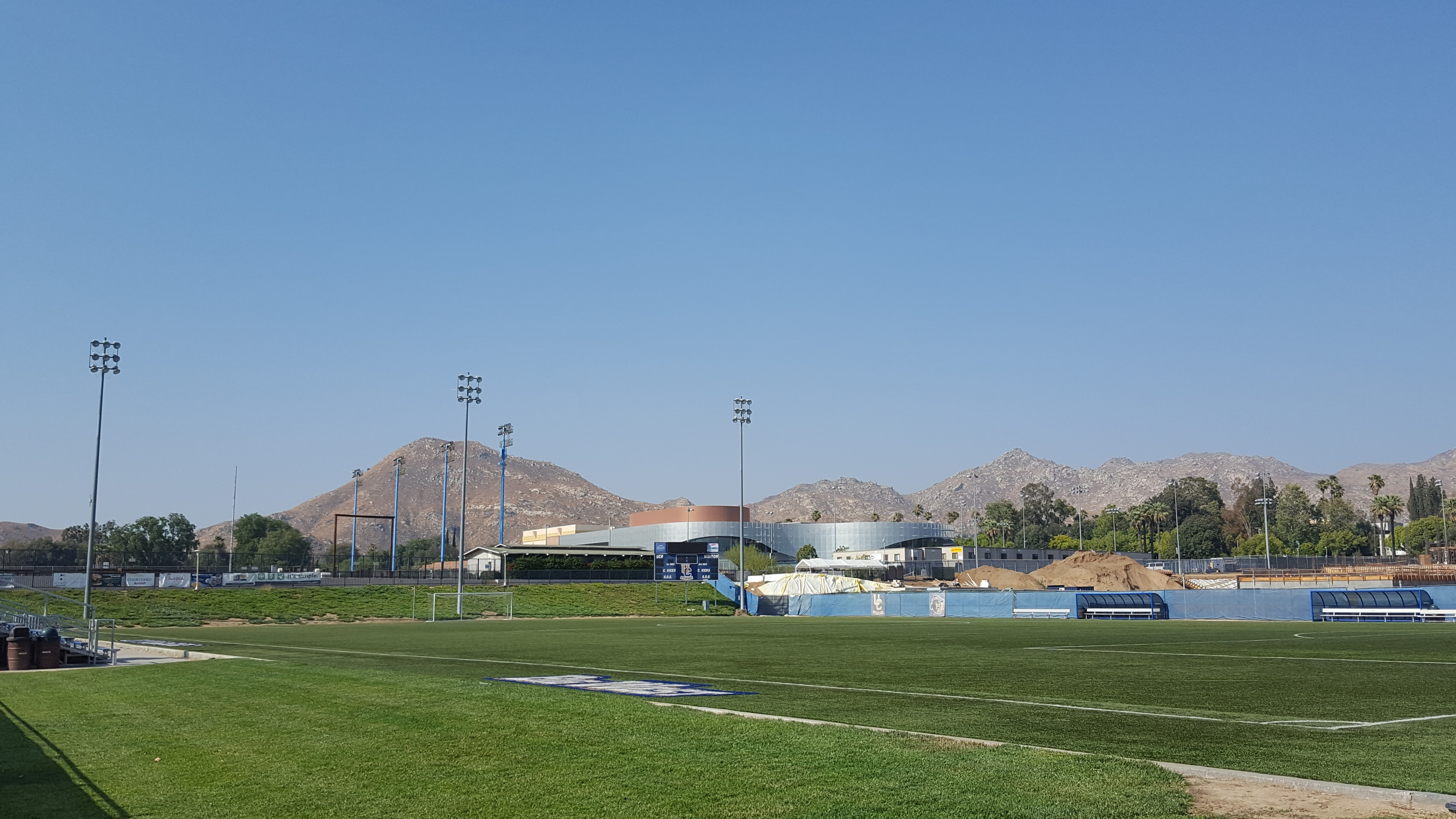
UCR Soccer Stadium in 2017

The volleyball and basketball teams play home games in the Student Recreation Center Arena (SRC), which seats 3,168. The baseball team competes at the Riverside Sports Complex. UCR graduate Troy Percival personally built UCR's baseball clubhouse to major league quality standards. Softball is played at the Amy S. Harrison Field, named after a UCR graduate who donated $300,000 towards its upgrade in 2004. Adjacent to the softball field are the soccer and track fields.

The soccer field was resurfaced with artificial turf in 2007. In 2011, the old track and field facility, which had bleachers that dated back to the 1950s and a track surface that was over 15 years old, was completely torn out and replaced with a brand new facility.

== Traditions ==
=== Mascot ===
"Scotty Highlander" is the mascot for UC Riverside. The original mascot was an aggressive little bear wearing a kilt for the school's logo. In 1998, a referendum to move to NCAA Division I was passed and the students approached the administration requesting a new mascot and the old mascot was replaced. In 2011, the mascot was updated again with students voting online and a new "Scotty Highlander" mascot, featuring a roaring bear wearing a plaid Tam o' Shanter was chosen.

=== School colors ===
All schools in the University of California System have a combination of blue and gold as their school colors. UC Riverside follows this tradition.

== See also ==
- List of NCAA Division I institutions
