= Matador Soccer Field =

Soccer stadium in Northridge, California

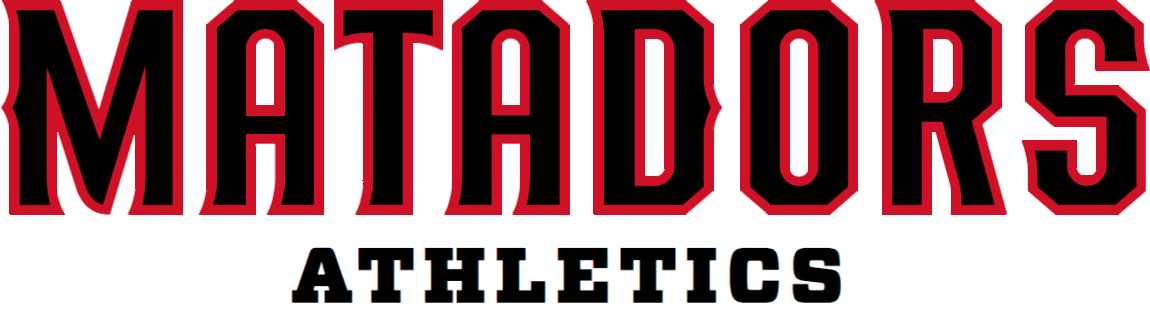

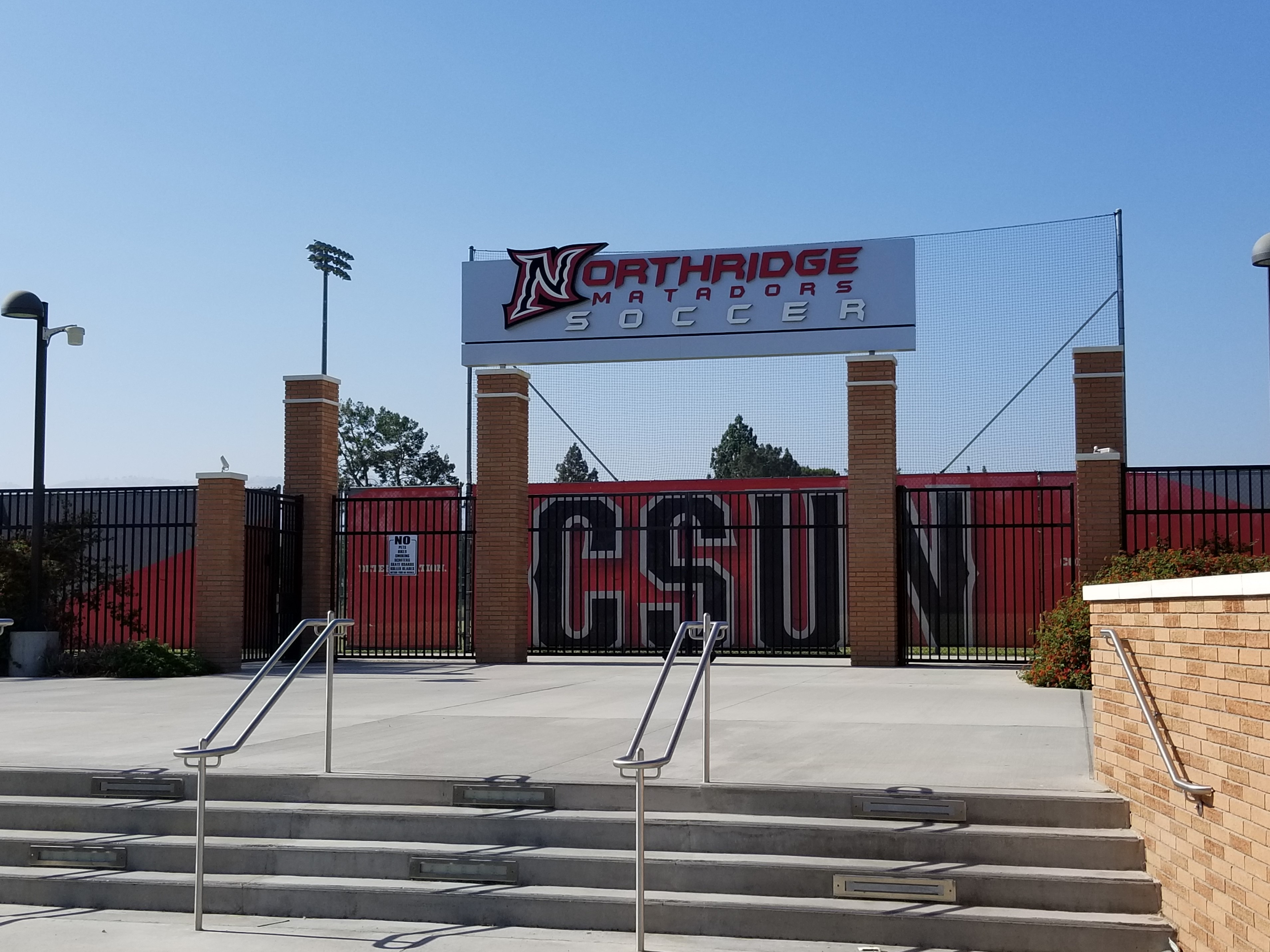
- The stadium as seen in 2018
- Interactive map of Matador Soccer Field
- Full name: Matador Soccer Field
- Location: Northridge, California
- Coordinates: 34°14′36″N 118°31′30″W
- Owner: California State University, Northridge
- Capacity: 1,550
- Surface: Natural grass
- Scoreboard: Yes

Construction
- Opened: 15 September 2002; 24 years ago

Tenants
- Cal State Northridge Matadors (NCAA) teams: men's and women's soccer

Website
- gomatadors.com/soccer-field

Matador Soccer Field is a 1,550-seat soccer-specific stadium on the campus of California State University, Northridge in Northridge, California. It is currently the home to the Cal State Northridge Matadors men's and women's college soccer teams.

Matador Soccer Field was host to a 2005 NCAA Men's Division I Soccer Championship match between Big West Conference foe UC Santa Barbara. The men's soccer team was victorious, scoring their first ever NCAA Tournament victory in a 3-2 decision.
