= UC Irvine Anteaters men's soccer =

American college soccer team

- Founded: 1984; 42 years ago
- University: University of California, Irvine
- Head coach: Yossi Raz (8th season)
- Conference: Big West
- Location: Irvine, California
- Stadium: Anteater Stadium (Capacity: 2,500)
- Nickname: Anteaters, UCI
- Colors: Blue and gold
Home	Away

NCAA Tournament Round of 16
- 2008, 2013, 2014

NCAA Tournament Round of 32
- 2008, 2009, 2011, 2013, 2014, 2018

NCAA Tournament appearances
- 2008, 2009, 2011, 2013, 2014, 2018, 2023, 2025

Conference Tournament championships
- 2008, 2009, 2011, 2013, 2023, 2025

Conference Regular Season championships
- 2008, 2010, 2011, 2013, 2018, 2021, 2025

The UC Irvine Anteaters men's soccer program represents the University of California, Irvine in all NCAA Division I men's college soccer competitions. Founded in 1984, the Anteaters compete in the Big West Conference.

The Anteaters are coached by Yossi Raz, who has coached the team since 2017 after previously coaching the Cal Poly Pomona Broncos and serving as an assistant for the Cal State Northridge Matadors. UC Irvine plays their home matches at Anteater Stadium.

== Honours ==
Conference	Championship	Titles	Winning years
Big West	Tournament	6	2008, 2009, 2011, 2013, 2023, 2025
Big West	Regular season	7	2008, 2010, 2011, 2013, 2018, 2021, 2025 (Note: Title shared with UC Santa Barbara and Cal Poly)

== Postseason ==
=== NCAA Tournament ===
UC Irvine has appeared in seven NCAA Tournaments. Their combined record is 4–7–1.

Season	Seed	Round	Rival	Res.	Score
2008	14	Second round	Cal Poly	W	3–0
2008	14	Third round	St. John's	L	2–3
2009	16	Second round	Stanford	L	0–1
2011	8	Second round	St. Mary's (CA)	L	1–2 (a.e.t.)
2013	12	Second round	North Carolina	W	1–0
2013	12	Third round	Maryland	L	0–1
2014	n/a	First round	UNLV	W	3–0
2014	n/a	Second round	Stanford	W	1–0 (a.e.t.)
2014	n/a	Third round	Providence	L	0–1
2018	n/a	First round	Grand Canyon	W	1–1 (6–5 p)
2018	n/a	Second round	Stanford	L	0–2
2023	n/a	First round	Loyola Marymount	L	2–4
2025	n/a	First round	Denver	L	0–2

== Yearly records ==
Below is a table of the program's yearly records.

Season	Coach	Overall	Conference	Standing	Postseason
Independent (Division I) (1984–1984)
1984	N/A	12–5–2	—	—	
Independent:		12–5–2	—		
Pacific Coast Athletic Association/Big West Conference (1985–1991)
1985	N/A	5–13–2	—	—	
1986	N/A	6–13	1–4	—	
1987	N/A	6–14	2–8	—	
1988	N/A	7–12	3–7	—	
1989	N/A	3–15–1	1–9	—	
1990	N/A	5–14–2	1–8–1	—	
1991	N/A	9–10	4–6	—	
PCAA/Big West (1st stint):		41–91-5	12–42–1		
Mountain Pacific Sports Federation (MPSF) (1992–2000)
1992	N/A	7–12	1–6	—	
1993	George Kuntz	6–14	1–6	—	
1994	George Kuntz	11–8	4–3	—	
1995	George Kuntz	3–15–2	1–5–2	—	
1996	George Kuntz	7–7–5	2–2–1	—	
1997	George Kuntz	6–10–4	1–3–1	—	
1998	George Kuntz	8–12	2–7	—	
1999	George Kuntz	8–11–1	3–4	—	
2000	George Kuntz	12–8–1	4–2–1	—	
MPSF:		68–97–13	19–38–5		
Big West Conference (2001–present)
2001	George Kuntz	10–4–6	6–1–3	—	
2002	George Kuntz	8–8–4	3–4–3	—	
2003	George Kuntz	6–11–3	3–4–3	—	
2004	George Kuntz	7–13	3–7	—	
2005	George Kuntz	11–6–3	7–2–1	—	
2006	George Kuntz	13–4–3	6–3–1	—	
2007	George Kuntz	6–9–5	1–1	—	
2008	George Kuntz	15–2–6	5–0–3	—	NCAA Sweet Sixteen (#14 National Seed)
2009	George Kuntz	15–7	6–2	—	NCAA Second Round (#16 National Seed)
2010	George Kuntz	14–3–3	7–1–2	—	
2011	George Kuntz	16–6–1	6–3–1	—	NCAA Second Round (#8 National Seed)
2012	George Kuntz	5–14–1	2–8	—	
2013	George Kuntz	15–5–3	7–2–1	—	NCAA Sweet Sixteen (#12 National Seed)
2014	Chris Volk	16–6–3	4–5–1	t-4th	NCAA Sweet Sixteen
2015	Chris Volk	5–11–4	3–5–2	6th	
2016	Chris Volk	5–13–1	3–6–1	8th	
2017	Yossi Raz	8–8–3	3–5–2	7th	
2018	Yossi Raz	11–6–4	5–1–1	1st	NCAA Second Round
2019	Yossi Raz	7–7–5	4–2–1	3rd	
2020	Yossi Raz	No season held due to Covid-19	No season held due to Covid-19	—	
2021	Yossi Raz	8–8–4	6–1–2	t-1st	
2022	Yossi Raz	6–12–2	5–3–1	t-2nd	
2023	Yossi Raz	9–7–4	5–3–1	2nd	NCAA First Round
2024	Yossi Raz	8–8–3	4–3–2	t-3rd	
2025	Yossi Raz	11–3–6	4–0–5	t-1st	NCAA First Round
Big West (2nd stint):		235–181–77	108–72–37		
PCAA/Big West Overall:		276–272–82	120–114–38		
Total:		356–374–97			
National champion Postseason invitational champion Conference regular season champion Conference regular season and conference tournament champion Division regular season champion Division regular season and conference tournament champion Conference tournament champion
