= UC Riverside Soccer Stadium =

Soccer stadium in Riverside, California

UCR Soccer Stadium
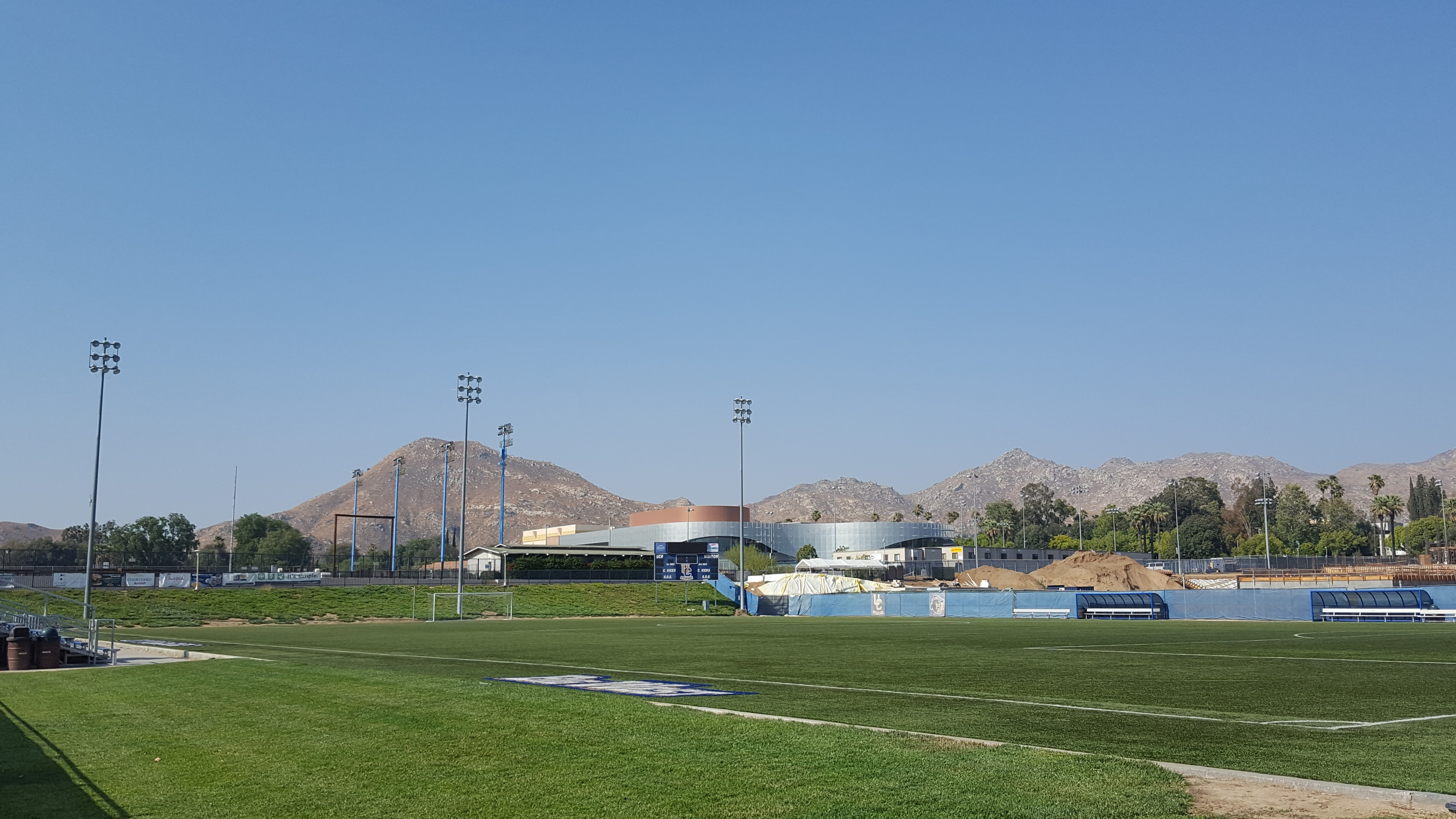
- The stadium in 2017
- Interactive map of UCR Soccer Stadium
- Full name: UC Riverside Soccer Stadium
- Address: Riverside, CA; United States
- Coordinates: 33.976597°N 117.329489°W
- Owner: University of California, Riverside
- Operator: UCR Athletics
- Capacity: 1,000
- Type: Stadium
- Surface: Artificial grass ("TigerTurf")
- Scoreboard: Yes
- Current use: Soccer

Tenants
- UC Riverside Highlanders (NCAA): men's and women's soccer; Deportivo Coras USA (NPSL)

Website
- gohighlanders.com/ucr-soccer-stadium

UC Riverside Soccer Stadium is a 1,000 seat soccer stadium on the campus of University of California, Riverside in Riverside, California.

== History ==
The fields where the UC Riverside Soccer Stadium stands were the original home of the UC Riverside Highlanders men’s soccer team during its first incarnation from the 1960s to the early 1980s. It also served as the home to the UC Riverside Highlanders baseball team.

Upon completion of the stadium, all 900 seats were located on the west-side of the stadium. The soccer team benches are located across the field on the east-side.

=== Renovations ===
The stadium's field was replaced with TigerTurf artificial grass in the summer of 2007. UC Riverside officially dedicated the field on 28 August 2008. With the installation of the synthetic grass, the men's soccer and women's soccer teams are able to practice and play on the same field without causing damage as can be the case with natural grass.

In the spring and summer of 2008, additional renovations were made to UC Riverside Soccer Stadium. A state-of-the-art scoreboard was added and improvements to the lighting at the stadium were completed. With the lighting improvements, UC Riverside's soccer teams were able to host night games. The first night game was held by the UC Riverside Highlanders women's soccer team on 5 September 2008.

== See also ==
- List of soccer stadiums in the United States
