= UC Riverside Highlanders men's soccer =

- Founded: 1965; 61 years ago
- University: University of California, Riverside
- Head coach: Tim Cupello (13th season)
- Conference: Pac-12; I Division
- Location: Riverside, California, US
- Stadium: UCR Soccer Stadium (capacity: 878)
- Nickname: Highlanders
- Colors: Blue and gold
Home	Away

NCAA tournament appearances
- 2018, 2022

Conference tournament championships
- 2018, 2022

Conference regular season championships
- 2022

The UC Riverside Highlanders men's soccer is the intercollegiate varsity soccer team representing the University of California, Riverside (also UCR), located in Riverside, California. Starting in 2026, UCR began play as a men's soccer affiliate of the Pac-12 Conference under the terms of a men's soccer alliance between the Pac-12 and UCR's primary home of the Big West Conference. Both the Big West and Pac-12 are member conferences in NCAA Division I.

The Highlanders' current head coach is Tim Cupello, who is in charge since 2013. The team play their home matches at the UCR Soccer Stadium, which has a capacity for 878 spectators.

The team was established in 1965, and played in the Big West from 2002 to 2025, where it has won two tournament championships (in 2018 and 2022, when the team also won the regular season)

== Stadium ==
UC Riverside plays its home matches at UCR Soccer Stadium, also used by the women's soccer team. The venue has a capacity of 878 people, although there is room for an additional 278 people on the grass. The field was renovated in 2007 with a TigerTurf artificial grass. One year later, a scoreboard was added to the facility. Moreover the lighting system was improved to allow men's and women's programs to host night games.

== Players ==
=== Current roster ===
As of December 2025

Note: Flags indicate national team as defined under FIFA eligibility rules; some limited exceptions apply. Players may hold more than one non-FIFA nationality.

No.	Pos.	Nation	Player
0	GK	USA	Giancarlo Sagredo
2	DF	USA	Jackson D’Alessandro
3	DF	GER	Jakob Schnitzler
4	DF	GER	Mika Kosch
5	DF	GER	Matti Richter
6	FW	USA	Grant Miller
7	FW	USA	Edward Castro
8	FW	USA	Wes Hastings
11	FW	ESP	José M. Rabadan
12	DF	USA	Brady Elliott
13	DF	USA	Ethan Walker

No.	Pos.	Nation	Player
14	MF	USA	Tarek Hamideh
15	FW	MNE	Andrija Radonjic
16	MF	USA	Ethan Gonzalez
18	DF	USA	Ace Tendale
19	MF	USA	Jona Martinez
20	MF	GER	Silvio Termini
21	FW	USA	Wyatt Ponting
22	DF	USA	Roman Rodriguez
25	MF	USA	Diego Ramirez
26	MF	USA	Kevin Meza
30	GK	USA	Grayson Gilmore

=== Records ===
Top scorers

#	Nat.	Player	Goals	Tenure
1	(Ecuador)	Juan Preciado	85	1972–75
2	(United States)	Luc Harrington	23	2001–04
3	(United States)	Cesar Diaz-Pizarro	20	2008–11
3	n/a	Dave Birch	20	1968
4	(United States)	Noah Lopez	15	2021–24

Assistances

#	Nat.	Player	Goals	Tenure
1	(United States)	Romario Lomeli	20	2013–16
2	(United States)	Ricardo Ruiz	19	2013–16
3	(United States)	Brendan Clark	14	2021–23
3	(England)	Otis Earle	14	2011–14

Saves

#	Nat.	Player	Goals	Tenure
1	(United States)	Charles Alamo	305	2003–07
2	(United States)	Carlos Gonzalez	259	2021–24
3	(United States)	Ashkan Khosravi	218	2012–15
4	(United States)	Vincent Morales	202	2015–17
5	(United States)	Cody Suppé	155	2008–11

=== Professional players ===
UCR players that play/have played at professional levels are:

Nat.	Player	Pro.	Professional career (teams)	Ref.
(United States)	Aaron Long	2012	Portland Timbers, Seattle Sounders, New York Red Bulls, Los Angeles FC	
(England)	Otis Earle	2014	FC Tucson, FC Dallas	
(United States)	Daniel Aguirre	2021	LA Galaxy, Guadalajara	

== Coaches ==
=== Current staff ===
As of 15 December 2025

Position	Name
Head coach	Andres Ochoa
Assist. coach	Chris Volk
Assist. coach	Romario Lomeli
Assist. coach	Tony Huerta

=== Coaching history ===
As of December 2025

#	Name	Tenure	Record
1	Peter Hofinga	1965–73	59–55–5
2	Charles Stamos	1974	9–7–2
3	Francisco Salcedo	1975–77	17–19–2
4	Cliff Singh	1978–80	26–20–2
5	Nat Gonzalez	2001–03	12–36–8
6	Junior Gonzalez	2004–12	53–96–12
7	Tim Cupello	2013–present	75–112–38 (Note: As of 2025)

== Titles ==
=== Conference ===
Conference	Championship	Titles	Winning years
Big West	Big West tournament	2	2018, 2022
Big West	Regular season	1	2022

== Team statistics ==
=== NCAA appearances ===
UB's appearances in NCAA tournament are listed below:

Key

- a.e.t. – Match went to extra time
- p – Match decided by a penalty shootout after extra time

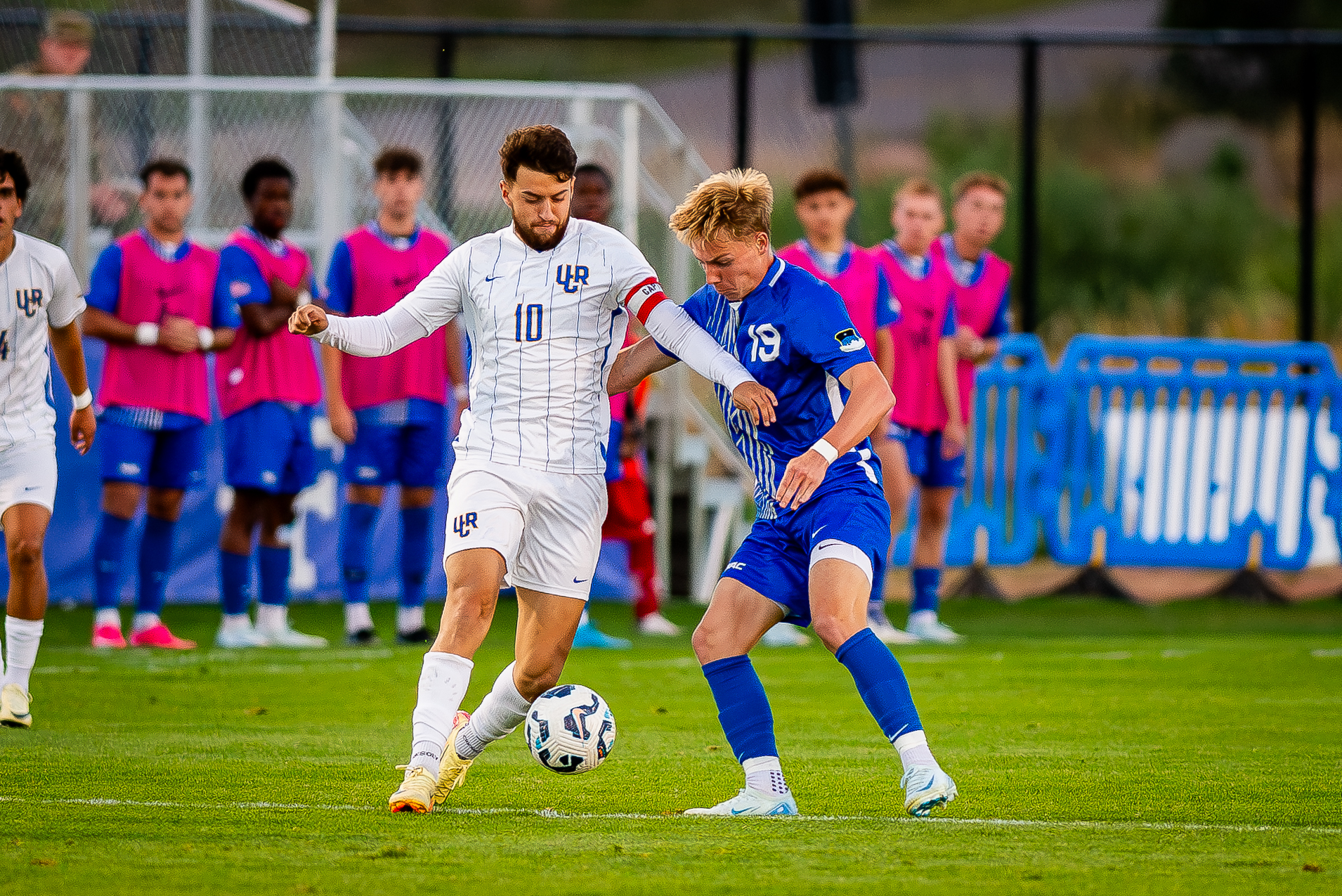
UC Riverside v Air Force match in 2024

Season	Stage	Rival	Res.	Score
2018	First round	Pacific	L	0–1
2022	First round	Portland	L	1–2
