= UC Davis Aggies men's soccer =

- Founded: 1972; 54 years ago
- University: University of California, Davis
- Head coach: Dwayne Shaffer (28th season)
- Conference: Mountain West
- Location: Davis, California, US
- Stadium: Aggie Soccer Field (capacity: 1,000)
- Nickname: Aggies
- Colors: Yale blue and gold
Home	Away

NCAA tournament Quarterfinals
- Division II: 1976

NCAA tournament Round of 16
- Division II: 1976

NCAA tournament Round of 32
- Division I: 2008, 2019; Division II: 1973, 1976

NCAA tournament appearances
- Division I: 2007, 2008, 2019, 2024; Division II: 1973, 1975, 1976, 1977

Conference tournament championships
- 2019, 2024

Conference regular season championships
- 1999, 2001, 2012, 2017, 2019

The UC Davis Aggies men's soccer team represents the University of California, Davis (UC Davis) in all NCAA Division I men's college soccer competitions. UC Davis competes in the Mountain West Conference (MW), where they have competed since 2026. There, they have won the regular season on three occasions: 2012, 2017, and 2019, and in the latter year, won the Big West Conference men's soccer tournament. At the Division I level, UC Davis has appeared in four NCAA tournaments, where the furthest they have reached is the second round in 2008 and 2019.

UC Davis left the Big West Conference (BWC) for the Mountain West Conference (MW) after the 2025 season. The Aggies became inaugural members of the MW's new men's soccer league in 2026.

The program is presently coached by Dwayne Shaffer, who has coached the program since 1997.

Several notable soccer players that have played for UC Davis include Quincy Amarikwa, Maximilian Arfsten, Nabilai Kibunguchy, and Wallis Lapsley.

== History ==
UC Davis began fielding a men's varsity soccer team began before 1972, but were coached in 1972 for 15 seasons by Will Lotter, who had previously coached the Aggies baseball and football team in the 1950s. During Lotter's tenure the program, playing at the Division II level, reached four NCAA Division I men's soccer tournaments, with their best performance coming in 1976. There, the Aggies reached the quarterfinals. Lotter retired in 1987, and for nine seasons, Simon Davies coached the program. In 1997, Dwayne Shaffer took over coaching duties which saw the program ascend to the Division I level and win its first conference regular season and tournament titles. As of 2025, Shaffer remains the head coach.

== Coaching staff ==
As of September 16, 2025.

Name	Position coached	Consecutive season at UC Davis in current position
Dwayne Shaffer	Head coach	28th
Jason Hotaling	Associate head coach	21st
Cayden Hotaling	Assistant coach	1st
Gabby Bermudez	Athletic Trainer	4th

== Championships ==
=== Conference regular season championships ===
Year	Coach	Overall Record	Conference Record
1999	Dwayne Shaffer	16–3–2	12–0–2
2001	Dwayne Shaffer	13–7–1	9–4–1
2012	Dwayne Shaffer	10–7–4	7–3–0
2017	Dwayne Shaffer	11–7–3	7–2–1
2019	Dwayne Shaffer	13–5–2	5–1–1
Conference regular season championships			5

=== Conference tournament championships ===
Year	Coach	Opponent	Score	Site	Overall Record	Conf. Record
2019	Dwayne Shaffer	UC Santa Barbara	2–0	Davis, CA	13–5–2	5–1–1
2024	Dwayne Shaffer	UC Santa Barbara	2–0	Santa Barbara, CA	10–6–6	4–3–2
Conference tournament championships						2

== Rivalries ==
UC Davis' rivalries in football with Cal Poly and Sacramento State. The Cal Poly series known as the Battle for the Golden Horseshoe in American football is unnamed in soccer. The Causeway Classic as it is called in American football is referred to as the Causeway Clasico.

== Records ==
=== Coaching records ===
Coach	Years	Overall		Conference		Notes
Coach	Years	Record	Pct.	Record	Pct.	Notes
Will Lotter	1972–87	Unknown	Unknown	Unknown	Unknown	4 NCAA Division II tournaments (1973, 1975, 1976, 1977)
Simon Davies	1988–96	80–38–3	.558	67–34–9	.650	
Dwayne Shaffer	1997–present	143–57–4	.711			2 TAAC Championships (1983, 1986)
Total		417–413–38	.532			

=== Player career records ===
Statistics below show the all-time program leaders.

Category	Record holder	Total
Games played	(United States) Matt Wiesenfarth	86
Points	(United States) Quincy Amarikwa (United States) Adam Mickelson	43
Points Per Game	(United States) Quincy Amarikwa	1.13
Goals	(United States) Quincy Amarikwa	20
Assists	(United States) Adam Mickelson	19
Penalty kick goals	(Nigeria) Sule Anibaba	5
Game-winning goals	(United States) Matt Wiesenfarth	7
Shutouts	(United States) Wallis Lapsley	21
Wins	(United States) Wallis Lapsley	35

=== Player season records ===
Statistics below show the all-time program leaders during the season

Category	Record holder	Season	Total
Points	(United States) Quincy Amarikwa	2008	31
Points Per Game	(United States) Maximilian Arfsten	2021	1.15
Goals	(United States) Quincy Amarikwa	2008	15
Assists	(United States) Dylan Curtis	2008	11
Shots	(United States) Quincy Amarikwa	2008	78
Penalty kick goals	(Nigeria) Sule Anibaba	2007	5
Shutouts	(United States) Wallis Lapsley	2018	9
Wins	(United States) Ryan McCowan	13	

== Postseason ==
=== NCAA tournament results ===
UC Davis has appeared in five NCAA Tournaments. Their combined record is 1–4–1.

Year	Round	Opponent	Result
2007	First round	California	L 1–2
2008	First round Second round	Denver; Michigan	W 4–0; L 1–2
2019	Second round	Louisville	L 0–1
2024	First round	San Diego	L 0–1

== Honors ==
- California Collegiate Athletic Association regular season
  - Winners (2): 1999, 2001
  - Runners-up (2): 1998, 2000
- California Collegiate Athletic Association tournament
  - Runners-up (2): 1998, 2001
- Big West Conference regular season
  - Winners (3): 2012, 2017, 2019
  - Runners-up (3): 2007, 2013, 2014
- Big West Conference tournament
  - Winners (1): 2019
  - Runners-up (4): 2012, 2017, 2018, 2023

== See also ==
- UC Davis Aggies women's soccer
