= Anteater Stadium =

Stadium in Irvine, California

- Interactive map of Anteater Stadium
- Address: 4000 Mesa Rd. Irvine, CA; United States
- Coordinates: 33°39′0″N 117°51′3″W
- Owner: UC Irvine
- Operator: UC Irvine Athletics
- Capacity: 2,500
- Type: Stadium
- Surface: Bermuda grass
- Record attendance: 2,187 (August 8, 2022) Opening Day vs. UC Berkeley
- Current use: Soccer; Track and field

Construction
- Renovated: 2000

Tenants
- UC Irvine Anteaters (NCAA) teams: men's and women's soccer; men's and women's track and field; Orange County Blues FC (2013–2016); USC Trojans football (practice venue, c. 2000)

Website
- ucirvinesports.com/anteater-stadium

Anteater Stadium is a 2,500-seat multi-purpose stadium with a bermuda grass field on the campus of the University of California, Irvine in Irvine, California, United States. It is used by the UC Irvine Anteaters men's & women's soccer and track and field teams.

== History ==
The stadium hosted the women's division of the 1973 USA Outdoor Track and Field Championships. The USC Trojans football team used the stadium for practices around 2000. In 2000, renovations added lights to Anteater Stadium. Anteater Stadium hosted the 2008 Big West Conference men's soccer tournament. The tournament final was the most-attended event at the stadium at the time, with 1,832 people present. The current most-attended event at the stadium belongs to the 2022 UC Irvine women's soccer team Opening Day versus UC Berkeley, with 2,187 people present. The stadium was the home stadium for United Soccer League minor-league professional soccer team Orange County Blues (now Orange County SC) from 2013 to 2016.

== See also ==
- Crawford Hall
- List of soccer stadiums in the United States
