= Cal State Northridge Matadors =

Intercollegiate sports program

- University: California State University, Northridge
- Nickname: Matadors
- NCAA: Division I
- Conference: Big West Conference (primary); Mountain Pacific Sports Federation (swimming & diving)
- Athletic director: Mary Beth Walker (acting)
- Location: Northridge, California
- Varsity teams: 19
- Basketball arena: Premier America Credit Union Arena
- Baseball stadium: Matador Field
- Softball stadium: Matador Diamond
- Soccer stadium: Matador Soccer Field
- Other venues: Matador Beach Volleyball Facility; Matador Pool; Matador Tennis Complex; Matador Track and Field Complex
- Colors: Red, white, and black
- Mascot: Matty
- Website: gomatadors.com
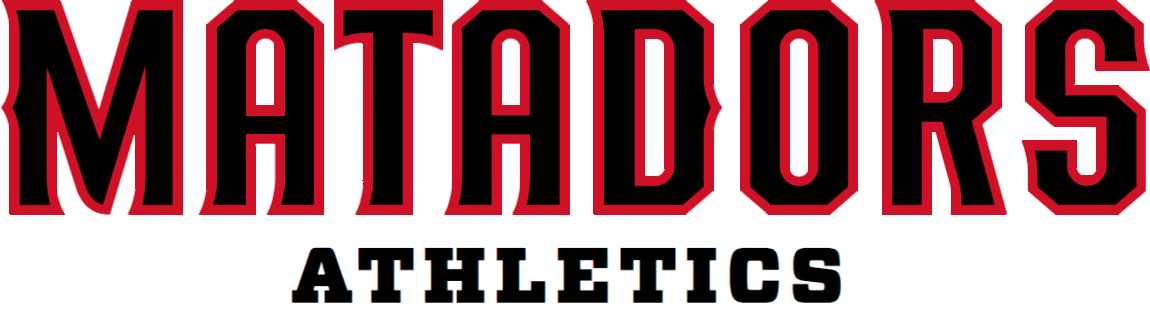

The Cal State Northridge Matadors (branded as the CSUN Matadors) are the athletic teams that represent California State University, Northridge in Northridge, Los Angeles, California. The Matadors field 17 teams in nineteen sports. The Matadors compete in NCAA Division I and are members of the Big West Conference.

CSUN has been a member of the Big West Conference since the summer of 2001 for most sports. The men's and women's indoor track and field teams compete in the Mountain Pacific Sports Federation instead. Men's volleyball also competed in the Mountain Pacific Sports Federation, but began to compete in the Big West beginning in 2018.

== Nickname ==
The Matador nickname was suggested in 1958 by student submissions, and was chosen over four other finalists. These included the Apollos, Falcons, Rancheros and Titans. The Matador is said to reflect the region's Spanish heritage.

== History ==
CSUN had previously been a member of the Big Sky Conference from 1996 to 2000. The Matadors won 34 NCAA Division II National Titles before moving up to Division I in 1990. That still ranks third all time in Division II.

== Sports sponsored ==
Men's sports	Women's sports
Baseball	Basketball
Basketball	Beach volleyball
Cross country	Cross country
Golf	Golf
Soccer	Soccer
Track and field^{1}	Softball
Volleyball	Tennis
	Track and field^{1}
	Volleyball
	Water polo
^{1} – includes both indoor and outdoor

=== Baseball ===
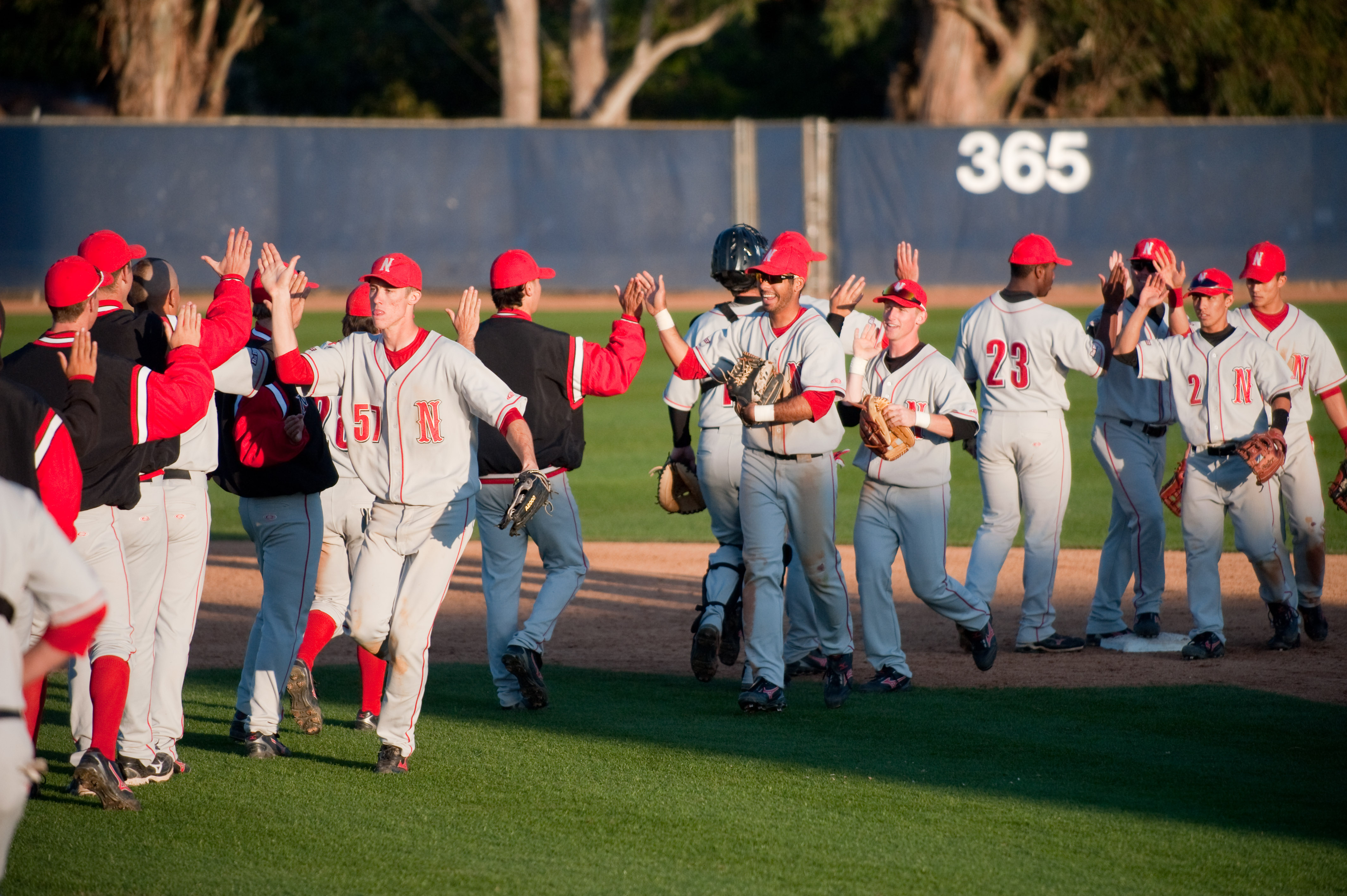
The Matadors baseball team celebrating a victory in 2010

The baseball team is a varsity intercollegiate athletic team of California State University, Northridge in Northridge, California, United States. The team is a member of the Big West Conference, which is part of the NCAA Division I. Cal State Northridge's first baseball team was fielded in 1959. The team plays its home games at 1,200-seat Matador Field. During its time in Division II, the Matadors baseball team won two national championships (1970, 1984).

=== Basketball ===
==== Men's basketball ====
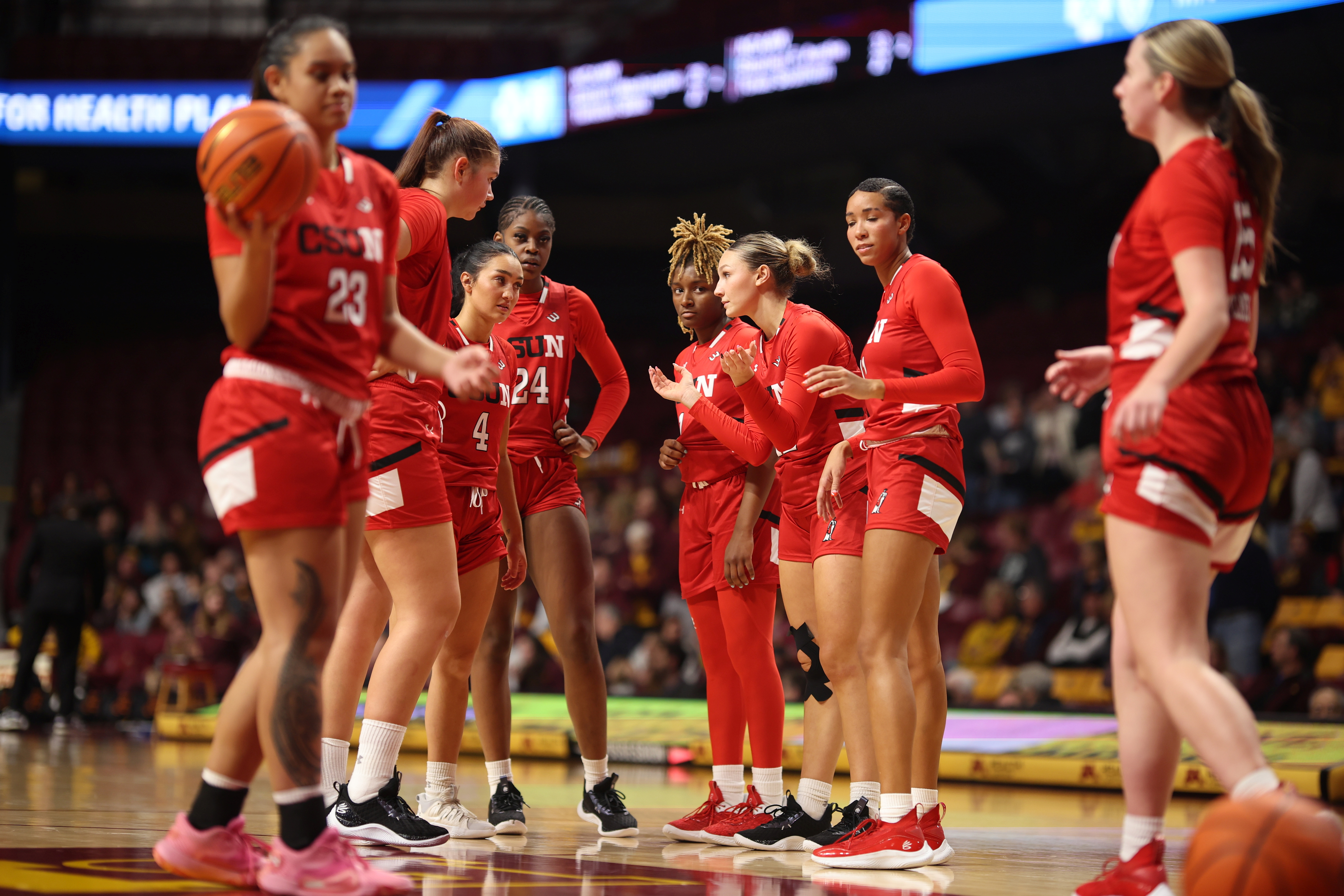
Matadors women's basketball team in 2023

The men's basketball team represents California State University, Northridge in Northridge, California, United States. The school's team currently competes in the Big West Conference, which is part of the NCAA Division I. Cal State Northridge's first men's basketball team was fielded in 1958–1959. The team plays its home games at the 2,400-seat Premier America Credit Union Arena.

==== Women's basketball ====
The women's basketball team represents California State University, Northridge in Northridge, California, United States. The school's team currently competes in the Big West Conference, which is part of the NCAA Division I. Cal State Northridge's first women's basketball team was fielded in 1958–1959. The team plays its home games at the 2,400-seat Premier America Credit Union Arena.

=== Soccer ===
==== Men's soccer ====
The men's soccer team have an NCAA Division I Tournament record of 1–7 through seven appearances.

Year	Round	Opponent	Result
2002	First Round	Loyola Marymount	L 0–1
2003	Second Round	FIU	L 1–2
2004	First Round	Loyola Marymount	L 0–1
2005	Second Round; Third Round	UC Santa Barbara; New Mexico	W 3–2; L 0–1
2012	First Round	San Diego	L 1–2
2013	Second Round	Stanford	L 0–1
2016	First Round	Pacific	L 0–1

==== Women's soccer ====
The women's soccer team have an NCAA Division I Tournament record of 0–1 through one appearance.

Year	Round	Opponent	Result
2012	First Round	San Diego State	L 0–3

=== Softball ===
While Division II members, the Matadors won the NCAA Division II softball tournament four times: 1983, 1984, 1985, and 1987

Since joining Division I, the Matadors softball team has appeared in two Women's College World Series in 1993 and 1994, advancing to the title game in 1994 before falling to Arizona. During its time in Division II, Matadors softball won four national championships.

=== Women's volleyball ===
The CSUN Matadors women's volleyball team have an NCAA Division I Tournament record of 1–5 through five appearances.

Year	Round	Opponent	Result
1992	First Round	USC	L 0–3
1996	First Round	Kansas State	L 1–3
2003	First Round	Loyola Marymount	L 0–3
2004	First Round	Kansas State	L 0–3
2013	First Round; Second Round	Colorado State; USC	W 3–2; L 0–3

== Former varsity sports ==
- Cal State Northridge Matadors football (discontinued 2001)
- Swimming (men's and women's) (discontinued 2010)

== Non-varsity sports ==
=== Rugby ===
CSUN women's rugby began as a university recognized club team in 2011, after a 17-year hiatus. CSUN women's rugby played in the Collegiate SoCal Division 2 in 2012, and finished ranked first in Southern California and 14th in the Nation in Division 2. In 2013, the team finished first in California and sixth in the Nation in Division 2.

== Championships ==
=== Appearances ===
The CSUN Matadors competed in the NCAA Tournament across 13 active sports (6 men's and 7 women's) 58 times at the Division I level.

- Baseball (6): 1965, 1991, 1992, 1993, 1996, 2002
- Men's basketball (2): 2001, 2009
- Women's basketball (4): 1999, 2014, 2015, 2018
- Men's soccer (7): 2002, 2003, 2004, 2005, 2012, 2013, 2016
- Women's soccer (1): 2012
- Softball (14): 1992, 1993, 1994, 1995, 1996, 1997, 1998, 1999, 2000, 2001, 2003, 2004, 2007, 2015
- Women's tennis (1): 2001
- Men's indoor track and field (2): 1998, 2008
- Men's outdoor track and field (3): 1992, 2007, 2010
- Women's indoor track and field (3): 1996, 1996, 2000
- Women's outdoor track and field (8): 1991, 1994, 1995, 1997, 2000, 2001, 2004, 2008
- Men's volleyball (2): 1993, 2010
- Women's volleyball (5): 1992, 1996, 2003, 2004, 2013

=== Team ===
CSUN has never won a national championship at the NCAA Division I level.

CSUN won 30 national championships at the Division II level.

- Baseball (2): 1970, 1984
- Men's golf (3): 1969, 1973, 1974
- Men's gymnastics (2): 1968, 1969
- Women's gymnastics (1): 1982
- Men's outdoor track and field (1): 1975
- Softball (4): 1983, 1984, 1985, 1987
- Men's swimming and diving (9): 1975, 1977, 1978, 1979, 1981, 1982, 1983, 1984, 1985
- Women's swimming and diving (4): 1982, 1987, 1988, 1989
- Men's tennis (1): 1969
- Women's tennis (1): 1982
- Women's volleyball (2): 1983, 1987

Below are four national championships that were not bestowed by the NCAA:

- Women's outdoor track and field – Division I (3): 1978, 1979, 1980 (AIAW)
- Women's volleyball – Division II (1): 1980 (AIAW)

=== Individual ===
CSUN had 6 Matadors win NCAA individual championships at the Division I level.

NCAA individual championships
Order	School year	Athlete(s)	Sport	Source
	1965–66	Rusty Rock	Men's gymnastics	
	1966–67	Rich Grigsby	Men's gymnastics	
	1970–71	Pat Mahoney	Men's gymnastics	
	1990–91	Darcy Arreola	Women's outdoor track and field	
	2006–07	Dashalle Andrews	Men's outdoor track and field	
	2007–08	Reindell Cole	Men's indoor track and field	

At the NCAA Division II level, CSUN garnered 163 individual championships.
