= 2002 UC Santa Barbara Gauchos men's soccer team =

American college soccer season

2002 UC Santa Barbara Gauchos men's soccer

Big West Conference Champions Bryant & Sons Cup Winners

NCAA Tournament, Second Round
- Conference: Big West Conference
- U. Soc. Coaches poll: No. 21 (final) / 12 (high)
- Record: 18–3–1 (9–0–1 BWC)
- Head coach: Tim Vom Steeg (4th season)
- Assistant coach: Leo Chappel (2nd season)
- Goalkeepers coach: Ryan Sparre (1st season)
- Home stadium: Harder Stadium

The 2002 UC Santa Barbara Gauchos men's soccer team represented the University of California, Santa Barbara during the 2002 NCAA Division I men's soccer season. The UC Santa Barbara Gauchos were led by head coach Tim Vom Steeg, in his fourth season. For the first time in program history, the team became nationally ranked during the season and made the NCAA Tournament, advancing to the second round.

== Background ==
The UC Santa Barbara Gauchos men's soccer team won the 2001 Big West Conference championship, however the conference did not have an automatic bid to the 2001 NCAA Division I Men's Soccer Tournament as the conference had just reinstated the men's soccer competition for the first time since 1991. The team did not receive an at-large selection by the NCAA which ended their 2001 season.

== Season summary ==
The 2002 UC Santa Barbara men's soccer team was tabbed as preseason favorites to win the league in the annual Big West Conference coaches poll, besting the UC Irvine Anteaters by one point. With no exhibition games to start the season, the Gauchos won the Michigan State Classic. After their next game against St. Mary's, the Gauchos were nationally ranked by College Soccer News for their first time in program history. Their unbeaten streak continued through the St. Louis Nike Classic, and Bryant & Sons Cup. Shortly after, the NSCAA/adidas, Soccer America, and Soccer Times all joined College Soccer News in adding UC Santa Barbara to their top-25 teams. Their first loss wouldn't come until October 6 against #7 Loyola Marymount. The Gauchos went unbeaten in Big West Conference play, including both games of the Blue–Green Rivalry against the Cal Poly Mustangs. The only other regular season loss the Gauchos experienced was to #1 Indiana Hoosiers.

The Gauchos claimed a share of the Big West Conference championship on November 9 after a 3–0 victory against the UC Riverside Highlanders. The Gauchos defeated the Cal State Fullerton Titans the following game 2–0 to claim the title outright. UC Santa Barbara earned an at-large bid to the 2002 NCAA Division I Men's Soccer Tournament and hosted the San Diego Toreros at Harder Stadium. The Gauchos won the match 2–0, but fell in the following round to the California Golden Bears.

== Player movement ==
=== Offseason departures ===
Name	No.	Pos.	Nation	Year	Reason for departure
Bradford Duttera	00	GK	USA	Sophomore	—
Jeremy Pruzin	0	GK	USA	Sophomore	—
Erik Stolhandske	01	GK	USA	Sophomore	—
Brian Reardon	2	FW	USA	Senior	Graduated
Aaron McAthy	6	MF	USA	Junior	—
Anthony Dimech	7	MF	USA	Senior	Graduated
Joe Hubay–Dies	11	FW	USA	Senior	Graduated
Reuben Bates	12	DF	USA	Senior	Graduated
Steven Sosa	13	MF	USA	Senior	Graduated
Galen Donaldson	15	DF	USA	Senior	Graduated
Jaime Ambriz	21	FW	USA	Senior	Graduated

=== Recruiting ===
The signing class was formally announced on May 16, 2002. A further signing was announced on July 9, 2002.

Name	Pos.	Nation	Previous	TDS Rating
Alan Keely	DF	IRL	Shelbourne F.C. St Joseph's C.B.S.	N/A
Jeff Murphy	MF	USA	Servite High School	N/A
Kyle Reynish	GK	USA	Hart High School; SoCal United	N/A

=== Transfers ===
Outgoing

Name	No.	Pos.	Nation	Year	New school
Kevin Maffris	14	DF	USA	Sophomore	California
Alex Tablin-Wolf	22	DF	USA	Freshman	Santa Clara
Sean Edwards	24	MF	USA	Junior	Westmont

Incoming

Name	Pos.	Nation	Year	Previous
David McGill	MF	IRL	Junior	Charlotte 49ers
Memo Arzate	MF	USA	Junior	Compton College
Jacob Kovacs	MF	USA	Junior	De Anza College

== Personnel ==
=== Player roster ===
Final 2002 roster.

Note: Flags indicate national team as defined under FIFA eligibility rules; some limited exceptions apply. Players may hold more than one non-FIFA nationality.

No.	Pos.	Nation	Player
00	GK	USA	Justin Pugh
0	GK	USA	Kyle Reynish
1	GK	USA	Danny Kennedy
2	DF	IRL	Alan Keely
3	MF	USA	Brandon Meeks
4	MF	IRL	David McGill
5	DF	USA	Pat Scott
6	MF	USA	Jon Apilado
7	MF	USA	Darren Doi
8	FW	USA	Matt Bly
9	MF	NZL	Neil Jones
10	FW	USA	Drew McAthy

No.	Pos.	Nation	Player
11	FW	USA	Gene Deering
12	DF	USA	Pete O'Hare
13	FW	USA	Will Meredith
14	MF	USA	Corey Wood
15	DF	NZL	Tony Lochhead
16	FW	CAN	Rob Friend
17	MF	USA	Dan Young
19	MF	USA	Matt Kubota
20	MF	USA	Nate Boyden
22	MF	USA	Memo Arzate
24	MF	USA	Jeff Murphy
25	MF	USA	Jon Claydon

=== Coaches ===
Position	Staff
Head coach	Tim Vom Steeg
Assistant coach	Leo Chappel
Goalkeeper coach	Ryan Sparre

== Schedule ==
Date Time, TV	Rank^{#}	Opponent^{#}	Result	Record	Site (Attendance) City, State
Regular Season
September 1, 2002*		vs. Michigan Wolverines; Michigan State Classic	W 5–3	1–0–0	Old College Field (240); East Lansing, Michigan
September 2, 2002*		at Michigan State Spartans; Michigan State Classic	W 3–2 ^{2OT}	2–0–0	Old College Field (713); East Lansing, Michigan
September 6, 2002*		Saint Mary's Gaels	W 6–0	3–0–0	Harder Stadium (892); Santa Barbara, California
September 13, 2002*		vs. James Madison Dukes; St. Louis Nike Classic	W 3–1	4–0–0	Hermann Stadium (212); St. Louis, Missouri
September 15, 2002*		vs. Southwest Missouri State Bears; St. Louis Nike Classic	W 4–1	5–0–0	Hermann Stadium (193); St. Louis, Missouri
September 21, 2002*		Westmont Warriors; Bryant & Sons Cup	W 5–2	6–0–0	Harder Stadium (1,678); Santa Barbara, California
September 29, 2002*	No. 25	Sacramento State Hornets	W 3–0	7–0–0	Harder Stadium (340); Santa Barbara, California
October 4, 2002*	No. 25	San Diego State Aztecs	W 3–0	8–0–0	Harder Stadium (403); Santa Barbara, California
October 6, 2002*	No. 25	at No. 7 Loyola Marymount Lions	L 1–0 ^{OT}	8–1–0	Sullivan Field (786); Los Angeles, California
October 12, 2002	No. 24	Cal State Fullerton Titans	W 2–1	9–1–0 (1–0–0)	Harder Stadium (383); Santa Barbara, California
October 16, 2002	No. 22	UC Riverside Highlanders	W 5–0	10–1–0 (2–0–0)	Harder Stadium (245); Santa Barbara, California
October 19, 2002	No. 22	at Cal State Northridge Matadors	T 0–0 ^{2OT}	10–1–1 (2–0–1)	Matador Soccer Field (513); Northridge, California
October 25, 2002	No. 17	at Cal Poly Mustangs; Blue–Green Rivalry	W 3–1	11–1–1 (3–0–1)	Mustang Stadium (425); San Luis Obispo, California
October 27, 2002*	No. 17	vs. No. 1 Indiana Hoosiers	L 3–1	11–2–1 (3–0–1)	Titan Stadium (335); Fullerton, California
October 30, 2002	No. 15	at UC Irvine Anteaters	W 4–1	12–2–1 (4–0–1)	Anteater Stadium (355); Irvine, California
November 2, 2002	No. 15	Cal Poly Mustangs; Blue–Green Rivalry	W 3–0	13–2–1 (5–0–1)	Harder Stadium (522); Santa Barbara, California
November 6, 2002	No. 15	Cal State Northridge Matadors	W 4–2	14–2–1 (6–0–1)	Harder Stadium (457); Santa Barbara, California
November 9, 2002	No. 15	UC Riverside Highlanders	W 3–0	15–2–1 (7–0–1)	UC Riverside Soccer Stadium (100); Riverside, California
November 13, 2002	No. 14	Cal State Fullerton Titans	W 2–0	16–2–1 (8–0–1)	Titan Stadium (437); Fullerton, California
November 16, 2002	No. 14	UC Irvine Anteaters	W 5–0	17–2–1 (9–0–1)	Harder Stadium (1,163); Santa Barbara, California
NCAA Tournament
November 16, 2002	No. 12	San Diego Toreros; First Round	W 2–0	18–2–1 (9–0–1)	Harder Stadium (3,420); Santa Barbara, California
November 27, 2002	No. 12	No. 23 California Golden Bears; Second Round	L 2–1	18–3–1 (9–0–1)	Edwards Stadium (1,286); Berkeley, California
*Non-conference game. ^{#}Rankings from United Soccer Coaches. (#) Tournament seedings in parentheses.

== Awards and honors ==
Recipient	Award	Date	Ref.
Rob Friend	NSCAA/adidas Third Team All-American	December 12, 2002	
Rob Friend	NSCAA/adidas First Team All-Far West Region	December 12, 2002	
Memo Arzate	NSCAA/adidas Second Team All-Far West Region	December 12, 2002	
Drew McAthy	NSCAA/adidas Third Team All-Far West Region	December 12, 2002	
Rob Friend	Big West Conference Offensive Player of the Year	November 20, 2002	
Alan Keely	Big West Conference Freshman of the Year	November 20, 2002	
Rob Friend	Big West Conference First Team	November 20, 2002	
Alan Keely	Big West Conference First Team	November 20, 2002	
Dan Young	Big West Conference First Team	November 20, 2002	
Memo Arzate	Big West Conference First Team	November 20, 2002	
Drew McAthy	Big West Conference First Team	November 20, 2002	
David McGill	Big West Conference Second Team	November 20, 2002	
Tony Lochhead	Big West Conference Second Team	November 20, 2002	
Danny Kennedy	Big West Conference Second Team	November 20, 2002	
Matt Kubota	Big West Conference Honorable Mention	November 20, 2002	

== Rankings ==
Ranking movements Legend: ██ Increase in ranking ██ Decrease in ranking — = Not ranked RV = Received votes
	Week													
Poll	Pre	1	2	3	4	5	6	7	8	9	10	11	12	Final
NSCAA	—	—	—	RV	25	25	24	22	17	15	15	14	12	21
Soccer America	—	—	—	—	24	23	—	24	25	—	25	24	23	N/A
Soccer Times	—	RV	RV	RV	24	22	23	18	19	21	20	18	17	N/A
