= 2004 Indiana Hoosiers men's soccer team =

American college soccer season

2004 Indiana Hoosiers men's soccer

Big Ten regular season and tournament champions Mike Berticelli tournament champions adidas/IU Credit Union Classic champions

NCAA Tournament, Champions
- Conference: Big Ten Conference
- U. Soc. Coaches poll: No. 1
- TopDrawerSoccer.com: No. 1
- Record: 19–4–1 (5–1–0 Big Ten)
- Head coach: Mike Freitag (1st season)
- Assistant coach: Todd Yeagley (2nd season)
- Captains: Danny O'Rourke; Jacob Peterson
- Home stadium: Bill Armstrong Stadium

Uniform
Home	Away

The 2004 Indiana Hoosiers men's soccer team represented Indiana University Bloomington during the 2004 NCAA Division I men's soccer season. It was the university's 32nd season fielding a varsity men's soccer team, and the program's 14th season in the Big Ten Conference. It was head coach Mike Freitag's first season as head coach for the program. The Hoosiers played their home fixtures at Bill Armstrong Stadium in Bloomington, Indiana.

Entering the season as the defending NCAA Division I men's soccer champions, the Hoosiers successfully defended their title, defeating UC Santa Barbara in the 2004 College Cup final. It was Indiana's seventh national championship, and their most recent until 2012. The Hoosiers finished the season with 19–4–1 record, and a 5–1 Big Ten record.

== Background ==
The 2003 season was Indiana's 31st season of men's varsity soccer. The Hoosiers finished the season with a 17–3–5 record, and qualified for the 2003 NCAA Division I Men's Soccer Tournament by winning the Big Ten regular season and Big Ten Tournament. Seeded eighth overall in the tournament, Indiana defeated Kentucky, nine-seed VCU, top-seed UCLA, and Santa Clara en route to the 2003 National Championship. There, the Hoosiers played six-seed St. John's and won 2–1, giving Indiana their sixth national championship. Indiana forward, Ned Grabavoy, was named a First-Team All-American at the conclusion of the season.

== Roster ==
As of December 31, 2004

Note: Flags indicate national team as defined under FIFA eligibility rules; some limited exceptions apply. Players may hold more than one non-FIFA nationality.

No.	Pos.	Nation	Player
1	GK	USA	Jay Nolly
2	DF	USA	Julian Dieterle
3	MF	USA	Pat Yates
4	DF	USA	Jed Zayner
5	MF	USA	Danny O'Rourke (Captain)
6	DF	USA	Jordan Chirico
7	MF	USA	Josh Tudela
8	MF	USA	John Michael Hayden
9	FW	USA	Michael Ambersley
10	FW	USA	Brian Plotkin
11	MF	USA	John Mellencamp
12	DF	USA	Chris Pomeroy
13	MF	USA	Josh Reiher
14	DF	USA	Drew Moor
15	MF	USA	Charley Traylor
16	FW	USA	Kevin Robson

No.	Pos.	Nation	Player
17	DF	USA	Nick Kuklenski
18	MF	USA	Brad Yuska
19	MF	USA	Billy Weaver
20	DF	USA	Greg Stevning
21	FW	USA	Kevin Noschang
22	FW	USA	Greg Badger
23	FW	USA	Jacob Peterson
24	DF	USA	Kyle Brabender
25	DF	USA	Kyle Schwartz
26	MF	USA	Ian Clair
27	MF	USA	Lake Hubbard
28	MF	USA	Doug Reisinger
29	FW	USA	Erek Kozlowski
30	MF	USA	Kiki Wallace
30	GK	USA	Nathan Scherpenisse
33	GK	USA	Chris Munroe

== Schedule ==
=== Regular season ===
September 3 1	Indiana	3–2 (a.e.t.)	Boston University	Bloomington, IN
1:00 pm ET	Julian Dieterle (yellow card) 15'; Mike Ambersley 31'; Josh Tudela (yellow card) 41'; Brian Plotkin (yellow card) 83' (goal) 89'; Jacob Peterson 95'	Report	Matt Cross (yellow card) 18'; Zach Kirby (yellow card) 38'; Jamie Johnson 54'; Erik Evjen 55'	Stadium: Bill Armstrong Stadium; Attendance: 3,774; Referee: Rich Grady

September 5 2	Indiana	3–1	Oregon State	Bloomington, IN
2:30 pm ET	Danny O'Rourke 18'; Julian Dieterle 50'; Jacob Peterson 86'	Report	Ryan Johnson 49'; Brian Johnson (yellow card) 83'	Stadium: Bill Armstrong Stadium; Attendance: 3,222; Referee: Ricardo Salazar

September 10 3	Indiana	2–1 (a.e.t.)	Cal State Fullerton	South Bend, IN
5:00 pm ET	Drew Moor 33' 112'; Jed Zayner (yellow card) 47'; Josh Tudela (yellow card) 64'	Report	Brent Barnes (yellow card) 33' (yellow-red card) 52'; Taylor Sheldrick 76'; Jose Barragan (yellow card) 80'	Stadium: Notre Dame Alumni Stadium; Attendance: 1,397; Referee: William Delois

September 12 4	Evansville	0–4	Indiana	South Bend, IN
11:30 am ET	Marc Burch (yellow card) 81'	Report	Brian Plotkin 4'; Danny O'Rourke 41'; Corey Southers 69' (o.g.); Greg Badger 86'	Stadium: Notre Dame Alumni Stadium; Attendance: 1,397; Referee: Dave Jaworski

September 15 5	Indiana	2–0	Notre Dame	Bloomington, IN
7:00 pm ET	Jacob Peterson 54'; Brian Plotkin 81'	Report	Christopher High (yellow card) 22'; John Stephens (yellow card) 62'	Stadium: Bill Armstrong Stadium; Attendance: 3,450; Referee: Ricardo Salazar

September 18 6	UC Santa Barbara	1–0 (a.e.t.)	Indiana	Albuquerque, NM
7:00 pm ET	Bryan Byrne (yellow card) 64'; Greg Curry (yellow card) 79'; Drew McAthy (yellow card) 91'; Tony Lochhead (yellow card) 92' (red card); Neil Jones (yellow card) 94'; Andy Iro (yellow card) 96' 105'	Report	Brian Plotkin (yellow card) 43'; Danny O'Rourke (yellow card) 91' (yellow-red card) 102'	Stadium: UNM Soccer Complex; Attendance: 1,282; Referee: Robert Baca

September 19 7	New Mexico	1–0 (a.e.t.)	Indiana	Albuquerque, NM
7:00 pm ET	Ben Ashwill (yellow card) 33'; Jeff Krause (yellow card) 69' (yellow-red card) 99'; Blake Danaher 110'	Report	Jacob Peterson (yellow card) 25'; Jed Zayner (yellow card) 75'; Drew Moor (yellow card) 95'	Stadium: UNM Soccer Complex; Attendance: 4,412; Referee: Richard Heron

September 26 8	Michigan State	1–3	Indiana	East Lansing, MI
1:00 pm ET	Greg Doster (yellow card) 37'; Ryan McMahen 87'	Report	Jacob Peterson 56', 60', 89'	Stadium: DeMartin Soccer Complex; Attendance: 1,237; Referee: Ricardo Salazar

October 1 9	Penn State	1–2	Indiana	State College, PA
7:00 pm ET	Brian Devlin 28'; Pasi Kauppinen (yellow card) 66'	Report	Mike Ambersley 14'; Jacob Peterson 37'; Greg Stevning (yellow card) 79'	Stadium: Jeffrey Field; Attendance: 1,237; Referee: Jorge de la Bandera

October 6 10	Kentucky	0–0 (a.e.t.)	Indiana	Lexington, KY
8:30 pm ET	Nathan Li (yellow card) 60'; Adam Walker (yellow card) 61'	Report		Stadium: UK Soccer Complex; Attendance: 2,458; Referee: Kelly Ross

October 10 11	Indiana	2–1	Michigan	Bloomington, IN
3:30 pm ET	Brian Plotkin 54'; Jed Zayner (red card) 56'; Josh Tudela (yellow card) 58'; John Hayden 85'	Report	Trai Blanks (yellow card) 6'; Dawson Stellberger (yellow card) 48'; Steve Hecker (yellow card) 65'; Ryan Sterba (red card) 78'; Bobby Trybula (yellow card) 83'; Mychal Turpin 90'	Stadium: Bill Armstrong Stadium; Attendance: 3,371; Referee: Ricardo Salazar

October 15 12	Indiana	1–0	Wisconsin	Bloomington, IN
8:00 pm ET	Hayden 7'	Report		Stadium: Bill Armstrong Stadium; Attendance: 2,147; Referee: Abiodun Okulaja

October 17 13	Indiana	0–1	Northwestern	Bloomington, IN
3:00 pm ET		Report	North 7'	Stadium: Bill Armstrong Stadium; Attendance: 1,773; Referee: Rich Grady

October 20 14	Butler	0–2	Indiana	Indianapolis, IN
8:00 pm ET		Report	Hayden 69'; Yates 70'	Stadium: Bud and Jackie Sellick Bowl; Attendance: 1,075; Referee: Ken Mather

October 24 15	Ohio State	0–1	Indiana	Columbus, OH
2:30 pm ET				Stadium: Jesse Owens Memorial Stadium

October 27 16	Indiana	2–0	Louisville	Bloomington, IN
7:00 pm ET	Hayden 4'; Yates 43'	Report		Stadium: Bill Armstrong Stadium; Attendance: 1,001; Referee: Abdu Bensalah

October 31 17	Saint Louis	1–2 (a.e.t.)	Indiana	St. Louis, MO
2:00 pm ET	Gasparovic 90'	Report	Chirico 14'; Peterson 92'	Stadium: Hermann Stadium; Attendance: 3,317; Referee: David Jaworski

November 3 18	Indiana	4–0	IUPUI	Bloomington, IN
8:00 pm ET	Dieterle 5'; Moor 46'; Hayden 72'; Stevning 78'	Report		Stadium: Bill Armstrong Stadium; Attendance: 1,023; Referee: Robert Isaac

=== Big Ten Tournament ===
November 12 SF	Michigan State	2–1	Indiana	Ann Arbor, MI
11:00 am ET	McMahen 17', 70'	Report	Yates 32'	Stadium: U-M Soccer Stadium; Attendance: 812; Referee: Ricardo Salazar

=== NCAA Tournament ===
November 23 Second round	Indiana	1–0	Michigan	Bloomington, IN
7:00 pm ET	Robson 87'	Report		Stadium: Bill Armstrong Stadium; Attendance: 1,742; Referee: Cheeco Grajeda

November 28 Regional SF	Indiana	1–0	Boston College	Bloomington, IN
2:00 pm ET	Tudela 41'	Report		Stadium: Bill Armstrong Stadium; Attendance: 1,831; Referee: Ricardo Salazar

December 5 Regional F	Indiana	4–0	Tulsa	Bloomington, IN
3:00 pm ET	Chirico 47'; Peterson 50', 53'; Badger 67'	Report		Stadium: Bill Armstrong Stadium; Attendance: 3,567; Referee: Peter Dhima

December 10 College Cup SF	Maryland	2–3 (a.e.t.)	Indiana	Carson, CA
8:00 pm ET	Garey 35'; Edu 81'	Report	Plotkin 52'; Ambersley 71'; Hayden 110'	Stadium: Home Depot Center; Referee: Alex Prus

December 12 College Cup F	UC Santa Barbara	1–1 (a.e.t.) (2–3 p)	Indiana	Carson, CA
4:00 pm ET	McAthy 82'	Report	Peterson 27'	Stadium: Home Depot Center; Attendance: 13,601; Referee: Tery Vaughn

== MLS Draft ==
Player	Position	Round	Pick	Club	Ref.
Danny O'Rourke	MF	1	4	San Jose Earthquakes	
Drew Moor	DF	2	6	FC Dallas	
Jay Nolly	GK	2	22	Real Salt Lake	
