= List of UC Santa Barbara Gauchos men's soccer seasons =

This is a list of seasons played by the UC Santa Barbara Gauchos men's soccer team in conference and regular season/NCAA tournament soccer play, from 1983, when UCSB first took part in conference play, to the present day. It details the club's achievements in conference, competitive out of conference, and NCAA Tournament games as well as the top point men and goal scorers for each season.

Season	Conference Record						Conference Tourn. Pos.	Overall Record					Honours	Top points		Top scorer	
Season	Conference	Pld.	W	L	D	Pos.	Conference Tourn. Pos.	Pld.	W	L	D	Natl. Rank	Honours	Top points		Top scorer	
1983	Big West	3	2	0	1			19	13	3	3		None				
1984	Big West	3	2	1	0			20	9	7	4		None				
1985	Big West	6	3	2	1			21	8	12	1		None				
1986	Big West	5	1	4	0			22	8	11	3		None				
1987	Big West	10	4	4	2			22	9	9	4		None				
1988	Big West	10	7	3	0			18	13	5	0		None				
1989	Big West	10	6	4	0			18	8	9	1		None				
1990	Big West	10	7	3	0			18	11	7	0		None				
1991	Big West	10	3	6	1			19	4	13	2		None				
1992	Big West	8	0	8	0			17	3	14	0		None				
1993	Big West	7	1	6	0			17	6	11	0		None				
1994	MPSF	7	4	2	1			20	9	10	1		None				
1995	MPSF	7	4	3	0			19	12	6	1		None				
1996	MPSF	5	1	4	0			18	4	12	2		None				
1997	MPSF	5	1	4	0			19	4	14	1		None				
1998	MPSF	9	0	8	1			20	2	17	1		None				
1999	MPSF	7	4	3	0			20	13	7	0		None				
2000	MPSF	7	2	4	1			19	8	10	1		None	Thiago Martins	14	Thiago Martins; Jaime Ambriz	6
2001	Big West	10	7	2	1	1st		19	11	5	3		Big West Champion	Rob Friend	27	Rob Friend	11
2002	Big West	10	9	0	1	1st		22	18	3	1	21	Big West Champion, NCAA 2nd Round	Rob Friend	44	Rob Friend	20
2003	Big West	10	7	3	0	2nd		22	16	5	1		NCAA 3rd Round	Drew McAthy; Neil Jones; Memo Arzate	30	Drew McAthy	14
2004	Big West	10	8	2	0	1st		25	21	3	1		Big West Champion, NCAA Finalists	Drew McAthy	43	Drew McAthy	18
2005	Big West	10	7	1	2	2nd		21	13	5	3	23	NCAA 2nd Round	Ivan Becerra	26	Ivan Becerra	12
2006	Big West	10	7	3	0	1st		25	17	7	1	1	Big West Champion, NCAA Champion	Eric Avila	21	Eric Avila	8
2007	Big West	12	9	1	2	1st		21	13	4	4	8	Big West Champion, NCAA 3rd Round	Ciaran O'Brien	25	Chris Pontius	11
Beginning with the 2008 season, the Big West Conference instituted a conference tournament to determine the winner of the NCAA automatic bid instead of awarding it to the regular season winner.
2008	Big West	10	5	2	3	2nd	Finals	22	10	7	5	22	NCAA 2nd Round	Chris Pontius	32	Chris Pontius	14
2009	Big West	10	8	1	1	1st	Finals	24	17	5	2	10	Big West Champion, NCAA 3rd Round	David Walker	24	David Walker	10
2010	Big West	10	7	2	1	2nd	Champion	22	14	5	3	19	NCAA 2nd Round	Sam Garza	24	Sam Garza	9
2011	Big West	10	6	4	0	2nd	Finals	23	15	7	1	12	NCAA 3rd Round	Luis Silva	44	Luis Silva	17
Beginning with the 2012 season, the Big West Conference instituted two divisions within regular season play, moving away from a single table format. UCSB's conference position will now be represented as the standing in the "North Division".
2012	Big West	10	4	5	1	4th		19	10	6	3			Nic Ryan	19	Nic Ryan	8
2013	Big West	10	7	0	3	1st	Semifinals	21	12	6	3	20	Big West Champion, NCAA 2nd Round	Goffin Boyoko	19	Goffin Boyoko	8
2014	Big West	10	6	2	2	1st	Semifinals	20	10	7	3		Big West Champion	Nick DePuy	21	Nick DePuy	10
2015	Big West	10	7	2	1	1st	Finals	23	14	7	2	15	Big West Champion, NCAA 3rd Round	Nick DePuy	31	Nick DePuy	15
2016	Big West	10	6	1	3	1st	Semifinals	20	10	7	3		Big West Champion	Kevin Feucht	24	Kevin Feucht	11
2017	Big West	10	4	3	3	2nd	First Round	19	6	8	5			Rodney Michael	20	Rodney Michael	8
Beginning with the 2018 season, the Big West Conference reverted back to a single table format, moving away from the North and South divisions within regular season play.
2018	Big West	7	4	2	1	3rd	First Round	18	10	6	2			Rodney Michael	17	Rodney Michael	7
2019	Big West	7	4	2	1	2nd	Finals	23	15	4	4	8	NCAA Quarterfinals	Will Baynham	28	Will Baynham	10
2020	Cancelled by the Big West Conference due to the COVID-19 pandemic.																
2021	Big West	9	6	1	2	1st	Champion	21	12	5	4		Big West Champion, NCAA 1st Round	Finn Ballard McBride	25	Finn Ballard McBride	9
2022	Big West	9	4	1	4	2nd	Finals	20	10	4	6			Finn Ballard McBride	27	Finn Ballard McBride	13
2023	Big West	9	4	3	2	3rd	Semifinals	20	10	8	2			Lucas Gonzalez	15	Lucas Gonzalez; Nemo Philipp	5
2024	Big West	9	4	2	3	2nd	Finals	22	12	5	5		NCAA 2nd Round	Alexis Ledoux	33	Alexis Ledoux	14

== See also ==
- UC Santa Barbara Gauchos men's soccer, the main page to the college soccer team at the University of California, Santa Barbara.
