= Jaime Ambriz =

American soccer player

Personal information
- Date of birth: December 7, 1978 (age 47)
- Place of birth: Ventura, California, United States
- Height: 6 ft 0 in (1.83 m)
- Position: Forward

Youth career
- 1993–1996: Rio Mesa High School

College career
Years	Team	Apps	(Gls)
1997–1998	Santa Barbara City College		(24)
1999–2001	UC Santa Barbara Gauchos		(17)

Senior career*
Years	Team	Apps	(Gls)
2002–2003	SV Lyss		(24)
2003–2004	FC Winterthur		
2004–2005	FC Concordia Basel		
2006–2007	Portland Timbers	4	(1)
2008	Ventura County Fusion	9	(0)
- * Club domestic league appearances and goals

Jaime Ambriz (born December 7, 1978) is an American former professional soccer player who played in Europe and the United States.

== Early life and education ==
Ambriz played high school soccer at Rio Mesa High School in Oxnard, California. He was a three-time All-Channel League and two-time All-California Interscholastic Federation player, as well as being the Channel League MVP in his senior season en route to the Spartans winning the Channel League title. He set school records with 30 goals in a season and 58 career goals.

Ambriz moved on to Santa Barbara City College, then coached by Tim Vom Steeg. During his freshman season he accumulated twenty-four goals and eleven assists for fifty-nine points on the 1997 State Final Four team. However, he had to redshirt his entire sophomore year due to a season-ending injury before play started.

Ambriz transferred to the University of California, Santa Barbara and played for the UC Santa Barbara Gauchos men's soccer team. He played with UCSB for three seasons, completing his sophomore through senior years with UCSB. As a junior, Ambriz appeared in fourteen games, tallying six goals and one assist for thirteen points. He was second on the team in scoring, trailing only Thiago Martins despite playing four less games. As a senior, Ambriz appeared in the same number of games (fourteen), but could only manage three goals and six assists for twelve points. Most of the goal scoring went to emerging star Rob Friend. Ambriz finished third in scoring, trailing Friend and Drew McAthy (four goals, five assists, thirteen points), but finishing above other professionals in Nate Boyden (four goals, eight points), Tony Lochhead (one goal, six assists, eight points), and Neil Jones (three goals, one assist, seven points).

== Professional career ==
After graduating from UCSB with a psychology degree, Ambriz sought a professional career. He moved to Switzerland and played with SV Lyss, FC Winterthur, and FC Concordia Basel from 2002 to 2005. With Lyss, he scored twenty-four goals in his first season, a total that led the league. In 2004, he had an unsuccessful trial with BSC Young Boys.

In 2006, Jaime traveled back to the United States and signed with the Portland Timbers. The signing was announced on June 29, 2006. It was announced Ambriz was re-signed for the following season on April 20, 2007, on a one-year contract. He appeared in 4 games during his two seasons with the club, but was not re-signed for a third season.

In 2008, Ambriz signed for Ventura County Fusion of the Premier Development League. He appeared in 9 games for the club. Recently, he has been playing with the amateur sides in the United States Adult Soccer Association-affiliated La Gran Liga de Oxnard based in Oxnard, California.
