= Memo Arzate =

American soccer player

Personal information
- Full name: Guillermo Arzate
- Date of birth: November 22, 1981 (age 44)
- Place of birth: Torrance, California, United States
- Height: 5 ft 10 in (1.78 m)
- Position: Midfielder

Youth career
- 1996–1999: Artesia High School

College career
Years	Team	Apps	(Gls)
2000–2001	Compton Community College		
2002–2003	UC Santa Barbara Gauchos	43	(10)

Senior career*
Years	Team	Apps	(Gls)
2004–2005	Portland Timbers	5	(0)
Total		5	(0)
- * Club domestic league appearances and goals

Guillermo "Memo" Arzate (born November 22, 1981) is an American former professional soccer player.

== Early life and education ==
Arzate attended Artesia High School from 1995 to 1999. He was a member of the Pioneers' soccer team which won back-to-back Suburban League Championships in '97 and '98. Arzate was a three-time Artesia High School MVP, as well as league MVP when he was a sophomore and junior. He was also recognized as the Pioneers' Offensive Player of the Year in '96 and '97.

Following an impressive high school career, Arzate was already garnering interest from professional scouts, but elected to attend Compton Community College, a route which would be later followed by Gaucho alum Tino Nuñez. With the Tartars, Arzate completed two seasons and was named First Team All-South Coast Conference and Conference MVP in both seasons. He amassed 18 goals and 27 assists in 2001 for an astonishing 63 points in a single season. The offensive output certainly turned heads, that of Tim Vom Steeg in particular.

Arzate was recruited to finish his junior and senior years at the University of California, Santa Barbara following his stellar offensive output with Compton Community College. During his junior year, he contributed immediately. He saw action in 21 games, scoring four goals and tallying 18 assists for 26 points. The total was good for 3rd on the team, surpassing eventual professionals in David McGill, Neil Jones, Alan Keely, Tony Lochhead, Nate Boyden. The offensive output guided the UCSB Gauchos to their first ever NCAA playoff appearance, defeating University of San Diego 2–0 at Harder Stadium before falling at University of California, Berkeley Golden Bears 2–1.

As a senior, Arzate played in 22 games, 21 of those started. He increased his point total to 30 points with six goals and 18 assists. The total put him in a three-way tie for the team lead with Drew McAthy and Neil Jones. With points aplenty, UCSB received a first round bye into the NCAA playoffs and beat previous tournament opponent California 2–0 at Harder Stadium, before falling 3–2 in double overtime at St. John's University in the Sweet 16. For his career, Arzate recorded 0.84 assists per game, which is the 6th best total in NCAA Division I history (with a minimum of 30 career assists). In 2003, his 18 assists led him to a 0.82 assists per game ratio, the highest in the NCAA Division I that year.

== Professional career ==
Despite UCSB not being a "traditional" college soccer powerhouse, Arzate was getting looks from the professional ranks. He caught the eye of Sigi Schmid and the Los Angeles Galaxy, who in turn drafted him with the 2nd pick of the 3rd round (22nd overall) in the 2004 MLS SuperDraft. With the Galaxy, Arzate made an appearance in a pre-season friendly against the San Jose Earthquakes in his old stomping ground Harder Stadium, home of the UCSB Gauchos. While a hit with the Santa Barbara fans, the Galaxy grew more disillusioned with the pick and Arzate did not make the Galaxy's 2004 roster.

Memo took matters into his own hands and went to Seattle, Washington, in hopes of joining up with the Seattle Sounders. Unfortunately, he was not signed by the Sounders, but another Pacific Northwest USL First Division team took notice.

After being referred to the Portland Timbers by fellow Santa Barbara native Hugo Alcaraz-Cuellar, Arzate impressed with his performances. He was eventually signed at the end of training camp. The Santa Barbara reunion was short-lived however, as Arzate was released following the completion of the 2005 season. He appeared in 5 games for the club.

== Awards and honors ==
For his time at UC Santa Barbara, Arzate was named the 2003–04 Male Athlete of the Year by the Daily Nexus.

== Career statistics ==
Club	Season	League			Playoffs		Cup		Continental		Total	
Club	Season	Division	Apps	Goals	Apps	Goals	Apps	Goals	Apps	Goals	Apps	Goals
Portland Timbers	2004	A-League	3	0	0	0	0	0	—		3	0
Portland Timbers	2005	USL-1	2	0	0	0	0	0	—		2	0
Career total			5	0	0	0	0	0	—		5	0
