= Paul Ehmann =

German footballer

Personal information
- Date of birth: 15 February 1993 (age 33)
- Place of birth: Ludwigshafen, Germany
- Height: 6 ft 2 in (1.88 m)
- Position: Midfielder

Youth career
- SG Eppstein-Flomershein 1990
- VfR Frankenthal 1900
- –2008: 1. FC Kaiserslautern
- 2008–2012: TSG 1899 Hoffenheim

College career
Years	Team	Apps	(Gls)
2013–2014	UC Santa Barbara Gauchos	29	(0)

Senior career*
Years	Team	Apps	(Gls)
2012–2013	Borussia Dortmund II	1	(0)
- * Club domestic league appearances and goals as of 14:53, 5 April 2016 (UTC)

Paul Ehmann (born 15 February 1993) is a German former footballer.

== Early career in Germany ==
After playing for numerous youth teams in Germany, it was announced on 3 April 2012 that Ehmann was to transfer to Borussia Dortmund II under former American international David Wagner. He made his first appearance for the club on 28 July 2012 against Arminia Bielefeld as a 90th-minute substitute.

== UC Santa Barbara ==
It was announced on 1 March 2013 that Ehmann would be enrolling at the University of California, Santa Barbara to play for Tim Vom Steeg on the UC Santa Barbara Gauchos men's soccer team.

After playing two seasons with the Gauchos, Ehmann left the team on 6 October 2014 due to family reasons. He appeared in 29 games total and recorded 1 assist.
