= Aaron López =

Aaron López may refer to:

- Aaron Lopez (1731–1782), Anglo-Portuguese Jewish merchant and philanthropist
- Aarón Irízar López (born 1950), Mexican politician
- Aaron López (footballer) (born 1983)
