= Tino Nuñez =

American soccer player

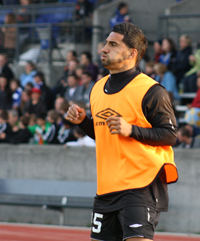
- Nuñez with Rochester Rhinos

Personal information
- Full name: Agustin Nuñez
- Date of birth: August 22, 1984 (age 42)
- Place of birth: Long Beach, California, United States
- Height: 5 ft 8 in (1.73 m)
- Position: Forward

Youth career
- 1999–2002: Millikan High School

College career
Years	Team	Apps	(Gls)
2002	Compton Tartars		
2004–2007	UC Santa Barbara Gauchos		

Senior career*
Years	Team	Apps	(Gls)
2007	Bakersfield Brigade	4	(0)
2008–2009	Real Salt Lake	12	(1)
2009	→ Harrisburg City Islanders (loan)	5	(0)
2010	Rochester Rhinos	16	(1)
2011	NSC Minnesota Stars	15	(0)
2012	Pittsburgh Riverhounds	19	(2)
2012–2013	Baltimore Blast (indoor)	13	(7)
2013–2019	Ontario Fury (indoor)	71	(65)

International career
- United States beach soccer
- United States arena soccer
- * Club domestic league appearances and goals

Agustin "Tino" Nuñez (born August 22, 1984) is a soccer coach and retired American soccer player.

== Early life and education ==
Nuñez played club soccer at North Huntington Beach FC (NHB) and was a four-year letter-winner at Millikan High School in Long Beach, California. With Nuñez in the squad, Millikan won four consecutive Moore League Championships as well as one CIF Championship. Nuñez earned numerous awards, including Freshman of the Year in his first year and First Team All-Moore League, All-CIF, and Moore League Offensive Player of the Year in his last. As a senior, Nuñez scored a team-high 25 goals and 18 assists.

After high school, Nuñez moved on to Compton Community College's soccer team. With the Tartars for only the 2003 season, he earned team MVP honors with 15 goals.

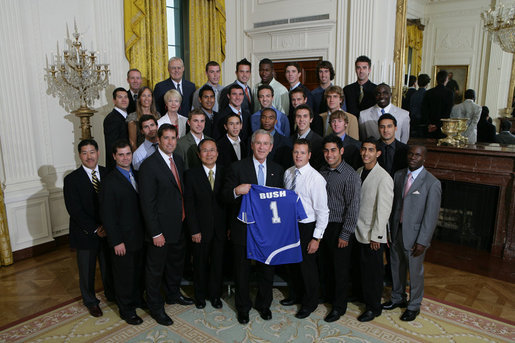
Nuñez and the 2006 UCSB Gauchos soccer team honored at the White House.

After the 2003 season, Nuñez transferred to the University of California, Santa Barbara. In 2004, his first season with the Gauchos, Nuñez played in 23 games (starting 6), scoring 2 goals and adding 6 assists. In addition to Nuñez, the UCSB's 2004 team also featured several other now-professional players including Tyler Rosenlund, Andy Iro, Bryan Byrne, and Ivan Becerra, and the Gauchos marched all the way to the 2004 Division I Men's College Cup, losing on penalties to Indiana University.

Nuñez had to redshirt the 2005 season to rehabilitate a torn ACL, but made a strong return the following season. In 2006, Nuñez played in 19 games (starting 7), scoring 1 goal, as the Gauchos were crowned champions of Division I college soccer by beating the Bruins from the University of California, Los Angeles in the 2006 Division I Men's College Cup in St. Louis, Missouri. This marked UCSB's first-ever national championship in soccer and only second overall.

In 2007, Nuñez played in 21 games (all starts), scoring 5 goals and adding 5 assists for the Gauchos.

== Playing career ==
Nuñez was drafted by Real Salt Lake in the 2nd round (17th overall) of the 2008 MLS Supplemental Draft.

His first action with the RSL first team came in the Lamar Hunt U.S. Open Cup against the San Jose Earthquakes on April 30, 2008. He came in as a 75th-minute substitute and assisted on the final goal of the game scored by Andy Williams.

Nuñez's first Major League Soccer appearance came on May 31, 2008, again against the San Jose Earthquakes. This time he was an 85th-minute substitute. His first MLS goal was a game-winner which came on 21 June 2008 against New England Revolution in the 60th minute. Nuñez finished his rookie season with 9 league appearances (2 starts) and 1 goal. He also scored 5 goals in Reserve League play.

The following season, Nuñez found playing time more difficult to come by, making just three appearances during RSL's 2009 MLS Cup-winning campaign. Real Salt Lake waived Nuñez in March 2010.

In April 2010, Nuñez signed with USSF D-2 Pro League club Rochester Rhinos for the 2010 season. He played with the Rhinos for one season.

NSC Minnesota Stars of the North American Soccer League signed Nuñez on March 22, 2011. He was released by the club on November 29, 2011.

Tino spent the 2012-13 Winter season with the Baltimore Blast of the MISL.

In October 2013, Tino signed with the Ontario Fury of the Professional Arena Soccer League. In his first year, Nunez appeared in 11 games and scored 22 goals with 6 assists. In his second year, Nunez appeared in 12 games and scored 12 goals with 15 assists. In his third year, Nunez appeared in 14 games and scored 12 goals with 8 assists. In his fourth year, Nunez appeared in 14 games and scored 9 goals with 5 assists.

== Coaching career ==
Nuñez returned to his high school alma mater in 2010 and served as varsity head coach and program director of Millikan HS girls soccer. Under his guidance, the Rams have transformed from an also-ran to a winning program, with Moore League titles in 2018-2019, 2019-2020, 2020-2021, 2022-2023, and 2023-2024. Previously, Millikan Girls Soccer had not won the Moore League since 1991 nor successive titles since 1984-85 and 1985-86. When he took over in 2013, he told the Long Beach Press-Telegram: “I don't want us to just compete anymore. I feel Millikan can compete. Now it's about winning... I feel we have a chance of taking [the Moore League Title]. That's what we want the girls to believe."

In 2014, Nuñez began coaching at FRAM SK in the South Bay area of Southern California, where he serves as Programs Director. As a club coach, he has led teams to Governor's Cup, President's Cup, and National Championships.

In June 2024, Long Beach City College announced Nuñez as the Head Coach of the Women's Soccer program. He coached previously as an assistant at Golden West College (Huntington Beach, CA) and Cerritos College (Cerritos, CA).

Nuñez directs a successful training business through T2five Training, hosting soccer camps and clinics as well as private individual and group training.

== Awards and honors ==
=== Real Salt Lake ===
- Major League Soccer MLS Cup (1): 2009
- Major League Soccer Eastern Conference Championship (1): 2009

=== Rochester Rhinos ===
- USSF Division 2 Pro League Regular Season Champions (1): 2010

=== UC Santa Barbara ===
- NCAA Men's Division I Soccer Championship (1): 2006

=== Coaching ===
- Moore League Coach of the Year: 2019, 2020, 2021, 2023, 2024
- Long Beach Press-Telegram Coach of the Year: 2024
