= Bryan Monka =

American soccer player

Personal information
- Full name: Bryan Monka
- Date of birth: June 12, 1980 (age 46)
- Place of birth: West Covina, California, U.S.
- Height: 6 ft 3 in (1.91 m)
- Position: Defender

Youth career
- Rio Mesa High School

College career
Years	Team	Apps	(Gls)
1999–2000	UC Santa Barbara Gauchos	4	(0)
2001–2003	Liberty Flames		

Senior career*
Years	Team	Apps	(Gls)
2004	Southern California Seahorses	13	(0)
2005–2006	Pittsburgh Riverhounds	18	(0)
Total		31	(0)

Managerial career
- 2017–: Adolfo Camarillo High School girls
- * Club domestic league appearances and goals

Bryan Monka (born June 12, 1980) is an American former professional soccer defender who last played for Pittsburgh Riverhounds.

== Early life and education ==
Monka was born June 12, 1980, in West Covina, California. He attended and played soccer for Rio Mesa High School in Oxnard, California.

Monka attended the University of California, Santa Barbara and played for the UC Santa Barbara Gauchos men's soccer team from 1999 to 2000. He appeared in 0 games in 1999 and 4 games in 2000 and failed to record a point. He later transferred to Liberty University to finish off his collegiate career with the Liberty Flames soccer team.

== Club career ==
Monka started his club career in his native Southern California with Premier Development League club Southern California Seahorses. In 2004, he made 13 appearances for the club.

Monka signed professional terms with Pittsburgh Riverhounds for the 2005 United Soccer Leagues Second Division season. He appeared in 10 games that season. Monka continued on with the Riverhounds for their 2006 season and played in 8 more games.

== Post-playing career ==
Monka went on to form Monka Soccer Academy, a youth soccer training program and club. He was named head coach of the Adolfo Camarillo High School girls varsity team ahead of their 2017–18 season.
