= Castle Villa A.F.C. =

Association football team, County Kildare, Ireland

Castle Villa
- Full name: Castle Villa Association Football Club
- Nickname: The Villa/Villains
- Founded: 1969
- Ground: Mullarney Park
- Capacity: 1,000
- League: Kildare & District Football League
Home colours	Away colours

Castle Villa AFC are an association football (soccer) team based in Castledermot, County Kildare, Ireland.

The team was formed by Walter Brookes in 1969. Commonly known as 'The Villa', there are two senior teams and many underage teams, ranging from U6 to U18. The jerseys are either solid blue with white lining, or blue with white stripes.

Mullarney Park, located on the Baltinglass road out of Castledermot, is the home pitch.

Two of the club's most successful teams of the past were the 1979 team which won the Counties Cup and the Sheeran Cup winners of 1984 and 1989.

Castle Villa won the Tony Lumsden League Cup for the first time in 1999–00. They won it again in 2009, when the League changed to a Summer Season, coming from behind three times to defeat Liffey Celtic in extra time. Villa won the trophy for a third time in 2012 when they beat Rathangan A.F.C. in the final 3–1. They also won the cup in 2016 when they once again beat Liffey Celtic.

Notable former players for Castle Villa include Bryan Byrne, who played League of Ireland football with Kildare County.

In 2019, Castle Villa celebrated its 50th anniversary. Current and formers members and players gathered for a Gala Dinner in the Woodford Dolmen Hotel, Carlow. The guest of honour was Brian Kerr.
