= Carson Vom Steeg =

American soccer player

Personal information
- Date of birth: February 1, 1999 (age 27)
- Place of birth: Santa Barbara, California, U.S.
- Height: 1.83 m (6 ft 0 in)
- Position: Defender

Youth career
- 2014–2017: Real SoCal

College career
| Years | Team | Apps | (Gls) |
| 2017 | Stanford Cardinal | 18 | (0) |
| 2018–2021 | UC Santa Barbara Gauchos | 22 | (2) |

Senior career*
| Years | Team | Apps | (Gls) |
| 2018 | Ventura County Fusion | 6 | (0) |
| 2022 | Loudoun United | 22 | (0) |
| 2023–2024 | Memphis 901 | 42 | (2) |
- * Club domestic league appearances and goals as of November 13, 2024

Carson Vom Steeg (born February 1, 1999) is an American soccer player who plays as a defender.

== Early life and education ==
Vom Steeg was born in 1999 in Santa Barbara, California and age 15, joined the Real SoCal Academy, where he played during his high school years. Vom Steeg graduated high school from San Marcos High School.

Ahead of the 2017 NCAA Division I men's soccer season, Vom Steeg signed a National Letter of Intent to play college soccer for Stanford University's men's soccer program. During his freshman year, Vom Steeg made 18 appearances for the Cardinal, helping them earn a national title in the process. During the college offseason, Vom Steeg returned to his native Santa Barbara to play for amateur USL League Two side, Ventura County Fusion. With the Fusion, Vom Steeg made six total appearances.

Ahead of his sophomore season, Vom Steeg transferred to UC Santa Barbara, uniting him with his father, Tim, who is the head coach for the program. During his sophomore year, he made 13 appearances for the Gauchos, scoring once. Ahead of his junior year, Vom Steeg suffered a season-ending injury, causing him to be redshirted for the 2019 NCAA Division I men's soccer season. Due to the COVID-19 pandemic, the program did not play during the 2020 season, meaning it was nearly three years before Vom Steeg played another competitive college soccer match. In his senior year, Vom Steeg made nine appearances, scoring once for the Gauchos.

== Playing career ==
Ahead of the 2022 USL Championship season, Vom Steeg signed a professional contract with Loudoun United FC, the reserve team of Major League Soccer outfit, D.C. United. On April 16, 2022, Vom Steeg made his professional debut, playing the full 90 minutes in a 1–4 away loss to Oakland Roots.

On January 17, 2023, Vom Steeg signed with USL Championship side Memphis 901.

== Personal life ==
Vom Steeg has one older brother, Justin, who plays for the Portland Timbers of MLS. He has two twin younger brothers, Caden and Jared, who play college soccer for the UC Santa Barbara men's soccer program. The three of them were teammates during the 2021 NCAA Division I men's soccer season. Vom Steeg's father, Tim, is the head coach of UC Santa Barbara's men's soccer team.

== Awards and honors ==
- NCAA Division I Men's Soccer Tournament Champion (1): 2017
