= Justin Vom Steeg =

American soccer player

Personal information
- Full name: Justin Eric Vom Steeg
- Date of birth: April 5, 1997 (age 29)
- Place of birth: Santa Barbara, California, United States
- Height: 1.93 m (6 ft 4 in)
- Position: Goalkeeper

Youth career
- 2007–2012: Santa Barbara Soccer Club
- 2012–2015: Real So Cal

College career
Years	Team	Apps	(Gls)
2015	UC Santa Barbara Gauchos	20	(0)

Senior career*
Years	Team	Apps	(Gls)
2015	Ventura County Fusion	11	(0)
2016–2017	Fortuna Düsseldorf	0	(0)
2016–2017	Fortuna Düsseldorf II	13	(0)
2017–2021	LA Galaxy II	58	(0)
2018–2021	LA Galaxy	0	(0)
2022	Portland Timbers	0	(0)
2022	Portland Timbers 2	6	(0)

International career
- United States U17
- United States U18
2016	United States U20		
- * Club domestic league appearances and goals as of September 23, 2022

Justin Eric Vom Steeg (born April 5, 1997) is an American former soccer player.

== Early life and education ==
Vom Steeg was born on April 5, 1997, to Almeria and Tim Vom Steeg. He attended San Marcos High School in Santa Barbara, California.

A highly-touted recruit, Vom Steeg played youth soccer for Real So Cal and was ranked as a four-star prospect by TopDrawerSoccer as the 2nd-best goalkeeper and 23rd-best player overall. He had also spent time with the United States youth national teams.

Vom Steeg enrolled at the University of California, Santa Barbara where he played college soccer for the UC Santa Barbara Gauchos men's soccer team. While at UC Santa Barbara, Vom Steeg played with Premier Development League side Ventura County Fusion.

== Career ==
On August 23, 2016, Vom Steeg signed for 2. Bundesliga side Fortuna Düsseldorf. He made no appearances for the parent club, but played in 13 Regionalliga West games during the 2016–17 Regionalliga season for Fortuna Düsseldorf II.

After a season in Germany, Vom Steeg moved back to the United States when he signed with United Soccer League side LA Galaxy II on September 8, 2017, with interest from American and German teams. On March 1, 2018, it was announced that Vom Steeg had moved up to LA Galaxy. Following the 2021 LA Galaxy season, Vom Steeg was released.

On January 25, 2022, Vom Steeg was signed by Portland Timbers. He was viewed to be the club's third-string goalkeeper. Following the 2022 Portland Timbers season, his contract option was declined by Portland.

== Personal ==
Justin is the son of Tim Vom Steeg, who is the head coach of the UC Santa Barbara Gauchos men's soccer team. He has three younger brothers, Carson, who played professionally, and twin brothers Jared and Caden, who played collegiately for UC Santa Barbara.
