= Thiago Martins (footballer, born 1976) =

Brazilian footballer

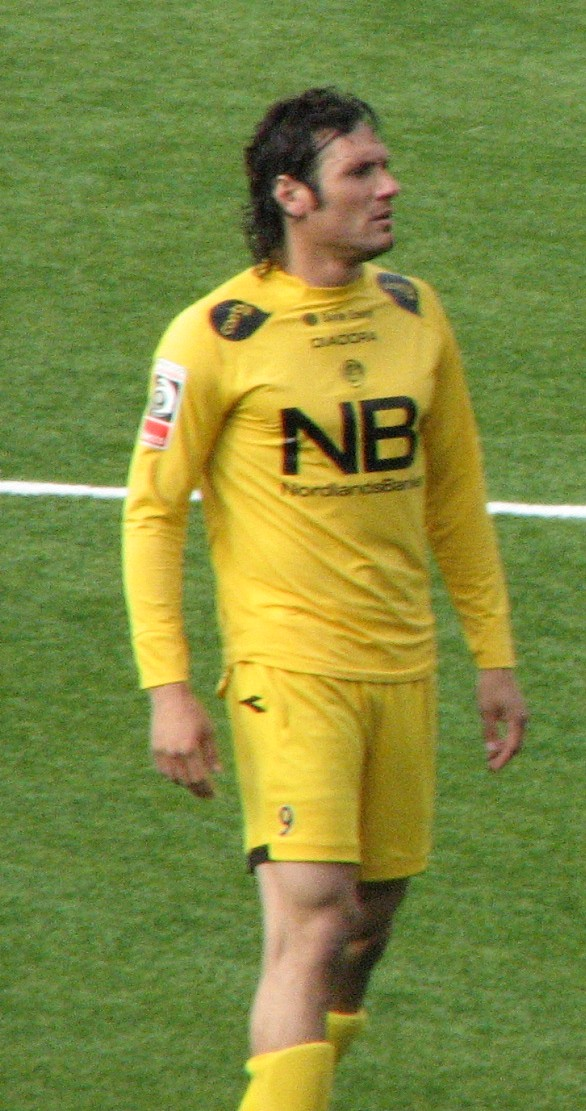
- Martins playing for FK Bodø/Glimt

Personal information
- Full name: Thiago Martins
- Date of birth: 4 September 1976 (age 50)
- Place of birth: São Paulo, Brazil
- Height: 6 ft 0 in (1.83 m)
- Position: Forward

Youth career
- Clube Atlético Juventus
- 1997–1998: Santa Barbara City College
- 1999–2000: UC Santa Barbara Gauchos

Senior career*
Years	Team	Apps	(Gls)
2001	San Diego Flash	20	(3)
2002	Minnesota Thunder	11	(2)
2002–2003	Pittsburgh Riverhounds	33	(30)
2003	D.C. United	5	(0)
2005	Chivas USA	22	(3)
2006	New York Red Bulls	1	(0)
2006	Colorado Rapids	25	(3)
2007–2010	FK Bodø/Glimt	83	(34)
Total		200	(72)
- * Club domestic league appearances and goals

Thiago Martins (born 4 September 1976) is a retired Brazilian footballer who played professionally in the United States and Norway.

== Early life and education ==
Martins was born on the east side of São Paulo, Brazil, and came to the United States in 1996. He landed in Los Angeles, at 19 years old and with little money. He eventually made his way to Santa Barbara, California, where he slept in hotels until his money ran out. He had to resort to sleeping on the beach. Fortunately, he awoke one morning to a group of people playing soccer on the beach and joined them. One of the players took Martins into their home, even though Martins spoke little English or Spanish and they spoke no Portuguese. He began to play soccer in Sunday leagues, where Tim Vom Steeg noticed his skill as he attempted to defend him in one game.

He was up top and I was a defender, so I covered him. I've covered a lot of forwards, Eric Wynalda for example, but no one was as strong as Thiago. He was just so powerful. When the game ended we talked, and I asked him if he was interested in playing at City College and getting an education.

— Tim Vom Steeg

Thiago agreed and started taking classes at Santa Barbara City College, where he played soccer for two years from 1997 to 1998 under head coach Tim Vom Steeg. Vom Steeg soon moved to nearby University of California, Santa Barbara to take up their head coaching position with Martins also transferring.

In 1999, his first season with the UC Santa Barbara Gauchos men's soccer team, he only played in 11 games due to a broken metatarsal, but still managed to score 6 goals. In his second season with UCSB, he scored 6 goals and assisted on 2 others for a point total of 14. He appeared in 18 matches and was named to the All-Big West Conference First Team.

== Professional career ==
=== USL A-League ===
Martins left UC Santa Barbara after the 2000 season to play for the now-defunct San Diego Flash of the A-League. He was drafted 56th overall in the 2001 A-League Draft, catching the eye of Colin Clarke, after putting in stellar performances with UC Santa Barbara and getting his green card during his senior year. After their demise at the end of the 2001 season, Martins joined fellow A-League team Minnesota Thunder, where he scored 2 goals in 11 appearances. Martins was subsequently released and moved to his third A-League side in Pittsburgh Riverhounds. With Pittsburgh, Martins hit his stride, scoring 8 goals in only 576 minutes over 8 games. Martins shined in the 2003 season, during which he scored 22 goals and had 7 assists in 25 games for the Riverhounds. For his performances, he was named the A-League MVP. After the end of the A-League season, Martins joined Major League Soccer team D.C. United.

=== Major League Soccer ===
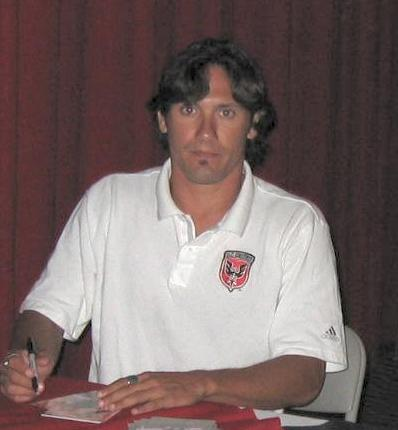
Martins with DC United in 2003

With United, he played in five games before the end of the season. While training following the 2003 season, Martins tore his left ACL. After an extensive rehabilitation process which saw him close to returning to the team, he tore the ACL again. As a result, Martins missed all of United's 2004 season. After the season, Martins was selected 17th overall by Club Deportivo Chivas USA in the 2004 MLS Expansion Draft. He scored the first goal in club history in its second match, a 3–3 draw with San Jose Earthquakes. Martins went on to score two more goals during the season.

Martins was traded to MetroStars, with a partial allocation, for Ante Razov in January 2006. He played just one game for the re-branded New York Red Bulls before again being traded, this time to Colorado Rapids, for Peguero Jean Philippe. At the conclusion of the season, he signed with FK Bodø/Glimt of the Adeccoligaen in Norway.

=== FK Bodø/Glimt ===
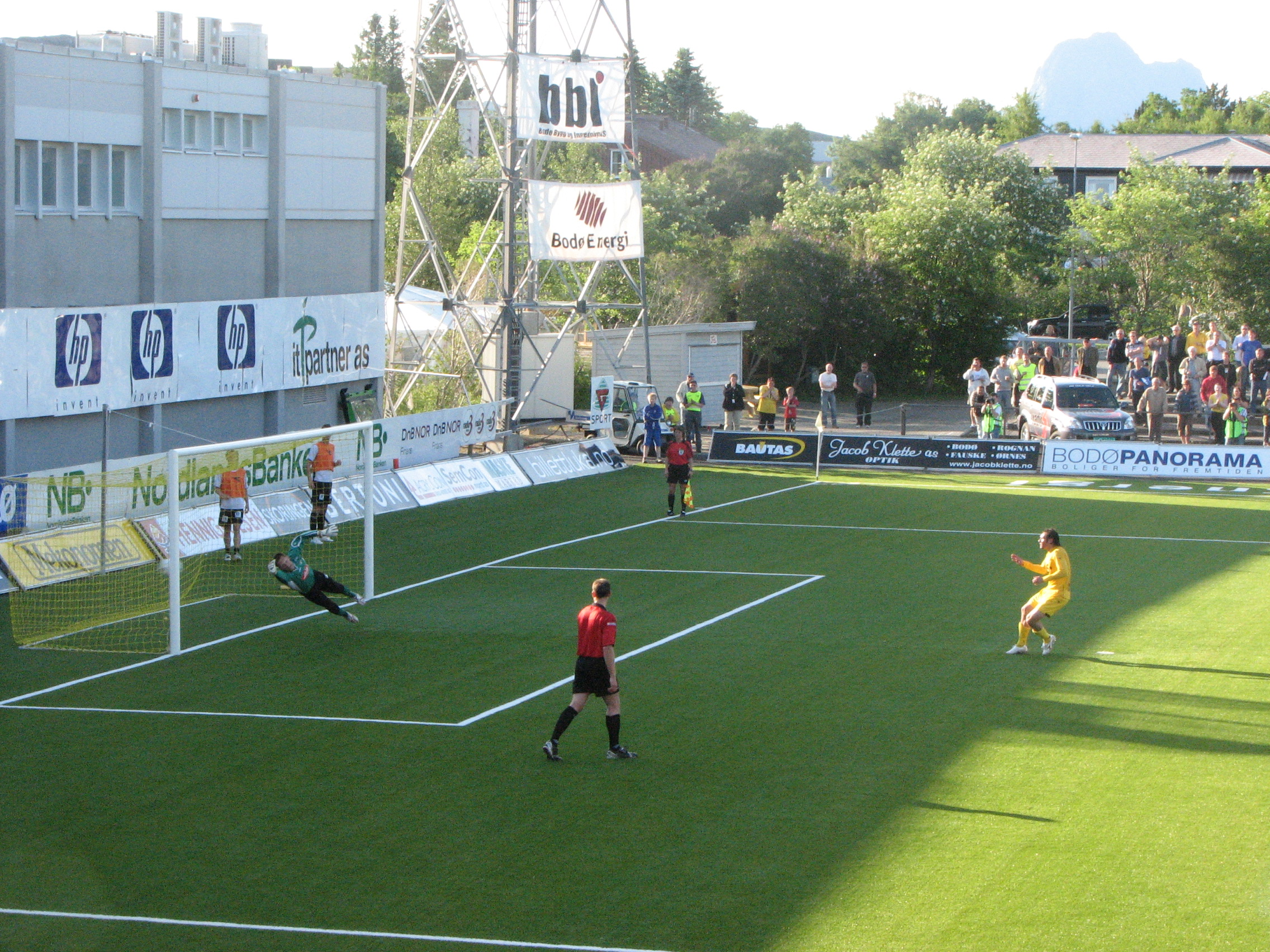
Martins with FK Bodø/Glimt

Against Tippeligaen side Tromsø IL, he scored two goals in FK Bodø/Glimt's 3–1 away win in the last game before the 2007 campaign. Martins suffered a knee injury in this game and was not 100% when he made his Bodø/Glimt debut in an obligatory match on 9 April 2007, away to Hønefoss BK. Martins contributed greatly for his new club becoming top-scorer as well as scoring in the play-offs. As a result, Martins and FK Bodø/Glimt gained promotion back to the Norwegian Tippeligaen for the 2008 season. Martins had a good year with FK Bodø/Glimt in 2008, and finished fourth even though he was injured for most of the season. However, the success did not last long and Glimt were relegated at the end of the 2009 after a very poor season in Tippeligaen. 2010 started promising for FK Bodø/Glimt in Adeccoligaen, but their initial good form declined, and they ultimately ended up in sixth place. Martins' contract expired at the end of 2010, and FK Bodø/Glimt decided to not offer him a new deal. He subsequently retired from professional soccer.

== Personal life ==
In 2016, Martins was teaching special-needs children and coaching a semi-professional Norwegian soccer team. When not teaching or coaching, he surfs and in October 2016 participated in the Lofoten Masters surfing competition in Unstad in the Lofoten Islands of Norway.

== Career statistics ==
Season	Club	Division	League		Cup		Total	
Season	Club	Division	Apps	Goals	Apps	Goals	Apps	Goals
2007	Bodø/Glimt	Adeccoligaen	26	17	2	0	28	17
2008	Bodø/Glimt	Tippeligaen	13	5	0	0	13	5
2009	Bodø/Glimt	Tippeligaen	21	4	2	1	23	5
2010	Bodø/Glimt	Adeccoligaen	23	8	1	0	24	8
Career Total			83	34	5	1	88	35

== Awards and honors ==
=== Individual ===
- A-League Top Scorer: 2003
