= Nate Boyden =

American soccer player

Personal information
- Full name: Nathaniel Bostwick Boyden
- Date of birth: November 27, 1982 (age 43)
- Place of birth: Woodland, California, United States
- Height: 6 ft 1 in (1.85 m)
- Position: Midfielder

Youth career
- 1997–2000: Davis Senior High School

College career
Years	Team	Apps	(Gls)
2001–2005	UC Santa Barbara Gauchos	82	(6)

Senior career*
Years	Team	Apps	(Gls)
2006–2007	Seattle Sounders	13	(0)
2009	Rostocker FC		
2012	Michigan Bucks	15	(4)

Managerial career
- 2011: Michigan Wolverines (volunteer assistant)
- 2012: Bradley Braves (assistant)
- 2013–: Loyola Ramblers (assistant)
- * Club domestic league appearances and goals

Nathaniel Bostwick "Nate" Boyden (born November 27, 1982) is an American former professional soccer player who currently serves as an assistant coach for the Loyola Ramblers men's soccer team.

== Early life and education ==
Boyden was born on November 27, 1982, in Woodland, California. He attended Davis Senior High School, where he played on the soccer team. He later attended the University of California, Santa Barbara.

While at UCSB, he played college soccer with the UC Santa Barbara Gauchos men's soccer team led by Tim Vom Steeg. He was with the program for 5 seasons, redshirting in 2003 to rehabilitate an injury. He would appear for the Gauchos in 82 games scoring 6 times.

== Playing career ==
Boyden made himself eligible for the 2006 MLS Supplemental Draft, but went undrafted. He also wasn't selected in the 2006 USL First Division College Draft.

Boyden did preseason training with the reigning USL First Division champion Seattle Sounders and Brian Schmetzer ultimately signed Boyden as a free agent in April 2006. He was eventually released after playing one game in 2007. Following the 2007 season, Boyden retired from playing professional soccer.

While on work in Germany, Boyden played for amateur side Rostocker FC in the German Verbandsliga Mecklenburg-Vorpommern.

In 2012, Boyden played for American amateur side Michigan Bucks in the USL Premier Development League, scoring 4 times in 15 games played.

== Managerial career ==
While attending graduate school at the University of Michigan, Boyden served as a volunteer assistant coach for the Michigan Wolverines women's soccer team under former United States women's national soccer team coach Greg Ryan. He spent one year with the Wolverines before accepting an assistant coach job with Bradley Braves.

In March 2013, Boyden was hired by former UCSB teammate Neil Jones as an assistant coach with Loyola Ramblers.

== Personal life ==
Boyden attended the University of Michigan for graduate classes and his first publication examined the factors affecting career length in Major League Soccer.

== Honors ==
=== Seattle Sounders ===
- USL First Division Championship (1): 2007
- USL First Division Commissioner's Cup (1): 2007
