= David McGill (footballer) =

Irish footballer

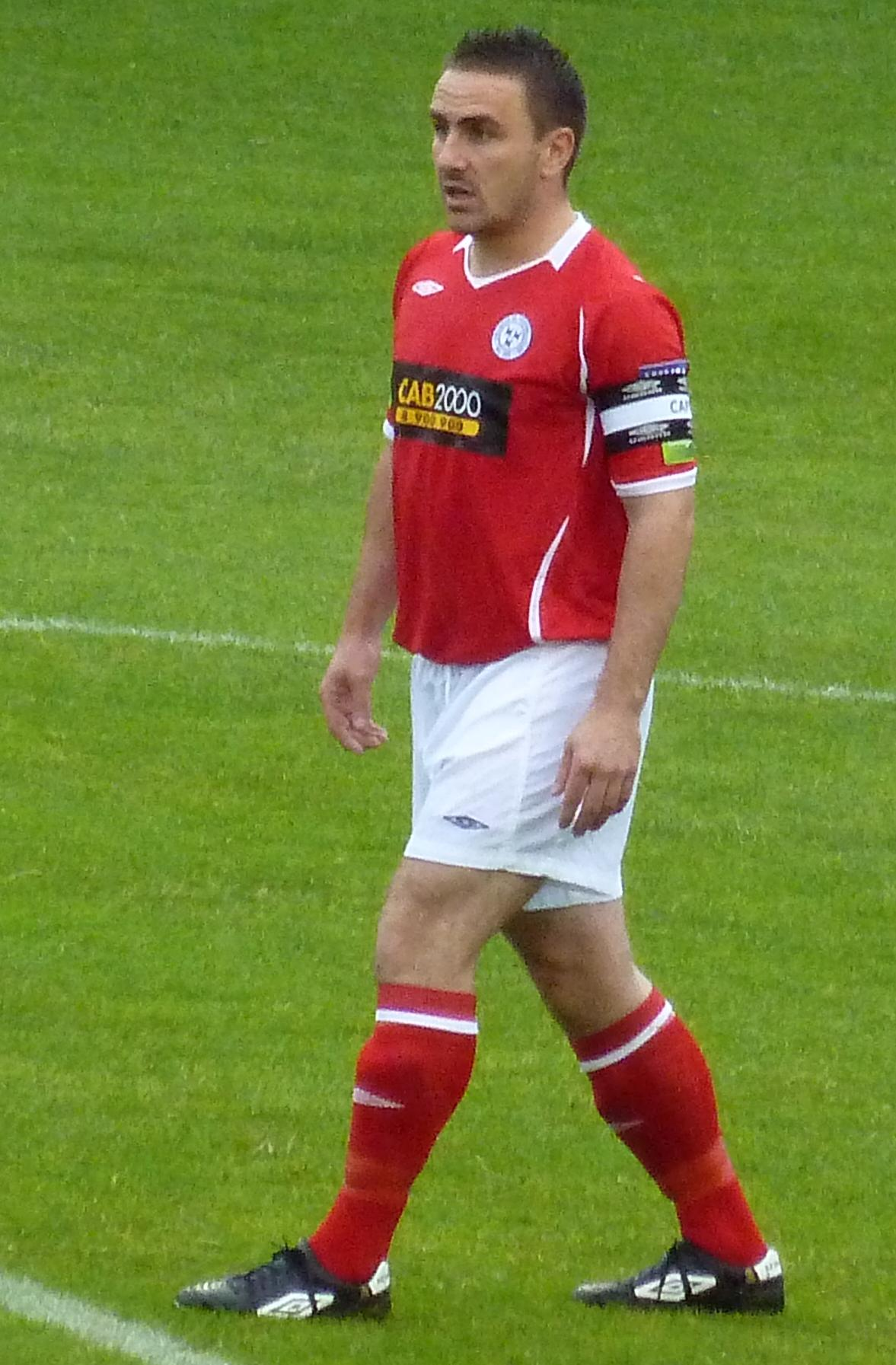
- McGill playing for Shelbourne

Personal information
- Date of birth: 24 October 1981 (age 45)
- Place of birth: Dublin, Ireland
- Height: 5 ft 9 in (1.75 m)
- Position: Midfielder

Youth career
- Manortown United
- Synge Street CBS
- 2000–2001: Charlotte 49ers
- 2002–2003: UC Santa Barbara Gauchos

Senior career*
Years	Team	Apps	(Gls)
2004	Dublin City		
2004	Mount Merrion YMCA		
2005–2006	Dublin City		
2006–2007	Shamrock Rovers	27	(2)
2007	Mount Merrion YMCA		
2008–2011	Shelbourne	105	(9)

International career
- Republic of Ireland U15
- * Club domestic league appearances and goals

David McGill (born 24 October 1981) is an Irish retired footballer who played as a midfielder.

== Early life and education ==
McGill played his entire youth career, from the Under 8s and up, with Manortown United. With Manortown, he won both league and cup titles and was named the Club Man of the Year while with the Under 16s.

He eventually decided to attend college in the US, enrolling at the University of North Carolina at Charlotte in 2000. McGill made an instant impact with the Charlotte 49ers, appearing in 18 games, starting 17 of those. He scored 1 goal, and assisted on 7 others, en route to score 9 points on the season. His 7 assists lead the team.

His second season with the team in 2001 wasn't as productive, with him playing in 20 games while only starting 14. He scored 1 goal and had 3 assists for 5 total points. His 3 assists were good enough to tie him for the team lead.

With the 49ers, McGill scored 2 goals and 10 assists for 14 points. He was named to Conference USA's All-Freshman Team in 2000 as well as being named to the Second Team All-Conference USA. In addition, he was the MVP of the 2000 Puma Classic. Following the completion of the 2001 season, McGill sought to transfer schools and left UNC Charlotte for UC Santa Barbara.

McGill enrolled at the University of California, Santa Barbara for his junior year in 2002. With the UC Santa Barbara men's soccer team, McGill played in 21 games, starting 20 of them. He netted 3 times and assisted on 15 others for 21 points. He was named to the Second Team All-Big West Conference and his assist total was good for 5th in the nation and 2nd in the conference, trailing teammate Memo Arzate's 18. He also assisted on UC Santa Barbara's first-ever NCAA postseason goal when he passed to Rob Friend against the University of San Diego.

His second season was just as productive as the first, appearing in 18 games and starting 17. He registered another 9 assists. The team, again, made the postseason but lost to Cal in the 2nd Round. However, McGill's performances had professionals taking note. The Los Angeles Galaxy drafted him in the 2004 MLS SuperDraft. He went in the 4th round, 33rd overall. Despite the honour, McGill passed on Major League Soccer, instead opting to sign with Dublin City in his native Ireland.

== Career ==
=== Dublin City & Mount Merrion ===
McGill returned to Ireland in 2004 and joined League of Ireland Premier Division side Dublin City. McGill broke into the Vikings' first team upon his return but was one of 14 players released by new Vikings boss Roddy Collins in a mid-season cull for the League of Ireland Premier Division strugglers. McGill joined Leinster Senior League side Mount Merrion YMCA for the remainder of the 2004 season before rejoining Dublin City for the 2005 season. That season, McGill helped the Vikings to promotion to the League of Ireland Premier Division after scoring Dublin City's winning goal in the first leg of a two-legged play-off victory over Shamrock Rovers. McGill remained at Dublin City for the 2006 season as part of their League of Ireland Premier Division campaign until the Vikings went out of existence due severe financial issues in July 2006.

=== Shamrock Rovers ===
McGill did not wait long to find a new club when he joined League of Ireland First Division leaders Shamrock Rovers. A lifelong Rovers fan, he made his debut for the club on 28 July 2006 against Athlone Town at St. Mels Park in a 3–0 victory for the Hoops and went to win the First Division with two goals in fourteen appearances. He made 29 appearances, scoring twice, in his time at the Hoops.

=== Mount Merrion & Shelbourne ===
McGill departed Rovers in August 2007 and rejoined his former club Mount Merrion YMCA later that month. McGill's second stint at Mount Merrion was again short-lived when he made a return to League of Ireland First Division action by signing for Shelbourne on 29 November 2007. McGill made his Shelbourne debut in a scoreless draw against Dundalk at Tolka Park on 7 March 2008. He scored his first Shelbourne goal during a 1–0 victory over Wexford Youths at Tolka Park on 17 October 2008. During the 2011 season he was injured against Salthill Devon ruling him out for the rest of the season.

== Honours ==
Shamrock Rovers

- League of Ireland First Division: 2006

Shelbourne

- Leinster Senior Cup: 2010
