= Aaron López (footballer) =

Mexican footballer (born 1983)

Aaron Lopez
Personal information
- Full name: Rogelio Aaron Lopez
- Date of birth: February 28, 1983 (age 43)
- Place of birth: Mexico
- Position: Defender

Youth career
- Carpinteria High School
- Santa Barbara High School

College career
Years	Team	Apps	(Gls)
2001–2004	UCLA Bruins	80	(9)

Senior career*
Years	Team	Apps	(Gls)
2005	Chivas USA	4	(0)
- * Club domestic league appearances and goals

Aaron Lopez (born 28 February 1983) is a Mexican former professional footballer who last played for Chivas USA in 2005.

== Career ==
=== College ===
Lopez helped lead the UCLA Bruins to the 2002 NCAA Division I Men's Soccer Championship, their fourth-ever title in the competition, by scoring a free-kick goal against Stanford in the final minutes to secure a 1–0 victory.

=== Chivas USA ===
Lopez featured in four league games for Chivas USA, starting in three and logging a total of 238 minutes. His time at the club was brief, as he was released alongside Alfonso Loera in August 2005.

== Honors ==
All honors listed on his UCLA profile.

=== High school ===
- CIF Div. III Defensive Player of the Year
- Channel League MVP
- Athletic Round Table Soccer Player of the Year
- Student Sports All-America selection

=== College ===
- UCLA's Rookie of the Year: 2001
- NCAA College Cup Offensive MVP: 2002
- Honorable mention All-Pac-10 selection: 2002
- UCLA's Team MVP: 2002
- Second-team All-Pac-10 selection: 2003
- First-team NSCAA All-Far West: 2004
- First-team All-Pac-10 selection: 2004
