= Blue–Green rivalry =

American college sports rivalry

Blue–Green Rivalry
Men's Soccer
First Meeting	1967
Games Played	71
All-time series	UCSB leads: 45–18–8
Men's Basketball
First Meeting	1937
Games Played	107
All-time series	UCSB leads: 73–34

Locations of Cal Poly and UC Santa Barbara

The Blue–Green Rivalry is the name of the rivalry between athletic teams from the University of California, Santa Barbara (Gauchos) and California Polytechnic State University, San Luis Obispo (Mustangs). Athletic competition between the two schools began in the 1921 on the football field.

The rivalry is best known recently for its games between the UC Santa Barbara Gauchos men's soccer and Cal Poly Mustangs men's soccer teams and is called the "Greatest Rivalry In College Soccer".

== History ==
=== First meeting ===
The UCSB Gauchos and Cal Poly Mustangs met in their first collegiate athletic event on November 5, 1921. Santa Barbara State Teachers College, as UC Santa Barbara was known then, started a football team and played Cal Poly, with Poly coming out as 42–0 winners.

=== California Collegiate Athletic Association ===
The rivalry heated up when both schools were members of the California Collegiate Athletic Association. The Gauchos joined the CCAA in 1939 and the Mustangs joined in 1945. The two would remain in-conference rival until the Gauchos departed in 1969 for the newly formed Pacific Coast Athletic Association.

=== Big West Conference ===
The Pacific Coast Athletic Association would later become known as the Big West Conference. Cal Poly joined in 1996 and the two have been competing in-conference match ups since.

=== Soccer Attendance Surge ===
In 2007 Cal Poly hosted then defending National Champion, UCSB, in Men's Soccer and promoted it as "Break the Attendance Record" Night. With over 7,000 in attendance, one of the then largest attendances in the history of College Soccer, Cal Poly defeated UCSB 2-1. This changed the rivalry from one that typically saw less than 1,500 fans, to sold out, capacity, stadiums (at Cal Poly) and numerous attendances records over 10,000 at both schools, eventually filling the majority of the Top 25 largest Regular Season Attendances in College Soccer History.

=== Formalization of the Blue–Green Rivalry ===
The two schools announced the formalization of the Blue–Green Rivalry in 2009 to highlight the athletic accomplishments, but also to promote environmental sustainability. October 2012 saw the schools increase promotions of the rivalry, including the addition of a new website. However, this website has since been discontinued.

=== Non-conference future ===
The two schools will be separated in men's soccer starting with the 2026 season. With the Big West and Pac-12 Conference entering into a men's soccer alliance at that time, Cal Poly will become an affiliate member of the Pac-12 in Men's Soccer, with UCSB remaining in the Big West. The two will be separated in all sports starting in July 2027, when UCSB leaves the Big West for the West Coast Conference.

== Men's soccer ==
The best known of the Blue–Green Rivalry games, Cal Poly and UCSB played each other twice a year in Big West Conference play through the 2026 season. With both schools located on the Central Coast of California less than 100 miles apart. The crowds of these games are record-setting and are among the highest regular season games in NCAA college soccer history.

In 2026, the Big West and Pac-12 Conference, the latter resuming full operation after a two-season hiatus, entered into a men's soccer alliance that will see four Big West members, among them Cal Poly, play as Pac-12 affiliates starting that season. The agreement calls for extensive cross-scheduling between the two conferences. After the 2026 season, the teams will be fully separated when UCSB joins the West Coast Conference.

Cal Poly victories	UCSB victories	Tie games

No.	Date	Location	Winner	Score	Attendance
1	September 3, 1994	San Luis Obispo, CA	Cal Poly	2–0	N/A
2	September 25, 1994	Santa Barbara, CA	UCSB	4–2	N/A
3	November 3, 1995	San Luis Obispo, CA	Cal Poly	4–1	N/A
4	October 18, 1996	Santa Barbara, CA	UCSB	2–1	N/A
5	November 15, 1996	San Luis Obispo, CA	Cal Poly	2–1	N/A
6	September 21, 1997	San Diego, CA	Cal Poly	2–1	N/A
7	October 18, 1997	San Luis Obispo, CA	Cal Poly	3–2	N/A
8	November 13, 1998	Santa Barbara, CA	Cal Poly	4–2	N/A
9	September 1, 1999	Santa Barbara, CA	UCSB	2–0	N/A
10	November 13, 1999	San Luis Obispo, CA	UCSB	4–2	N/A
11	November 7, 2000	San Luis Obispo, CA	Cal Poly	3–0	206
12	October 19, 2001	Santa Barbara, CA	UCSB	3–1	318
13	November 9, 2001	San Luis Obispo, CA	UCSB	5–1	575
14	October 25, 2002	San Luis Obispo, CA	UCSB	3–1	425
15	November 2, 2002	Santa Barbara, CA	UCSB	3–0	522
16	September 24, 2003	Santa Barbara, CA	UCSB (10)	2–0	617
17	October 22, 2003	San Luis Obispo, CA	UCSB (7)	3–1	307
18	October 9, 2004	San Luis Obispo, CA	UCSB (1)	2–0	1,837
19	October 23, 2004	Santa Barbara, CA	UCSB (2)	2–0	607
20	September 28, 2005	San Luis Obispo, CA	UCSB (19)	3–1	568
21	October 22, 2005	Santa Barbara, CA	UCSB(14)	2–0	1,091
22	September 5, 2006	Santa Barbara, CA	UCSB (7)	2–0	924
23	October 14, 2006	San Luis Obispo, CA	UCSB	2–0	1,123
24	October 17, 2007	San Luis Obispo, CA	Cal Poly	2–1	7,143
25	November 3, 2007	Santa Barbara, CA	UCSB (12)	3–1	8,102
26	October 17, 2008	San Luis Obispo, CA	Tie	0–1 ^{2OT}	11,075
27	October 5, 2008	Santa Barbara, CA	Tie	0–0 ^{2OT}	9,749
28	November 12, 2008	Santa Barbara, CA	Cal Poly	2–2 ^{2OT}	3,601
29	October 7, 2009	Santa Barbara, CA	UCSB (7)	1–0	5,842
30	November 4, 2009	San Luis Obispo, CA	Tie	0–0 ^{2OT}	9,824

No.	Date	Location	Winner	Score	Attendance
31	October 12, 2010	Santa Barbara, CA	UCSB	2–1	6,057
32	October 27, 2010	San Luis Obispo, CA	Cal Poly	2–1 ^{OT}	8,125
33	November 10, 2010	Santa Barbara, CA	UCSB (22)	2 ^{OT}–1	4,084
34	October 14, 2011	San Luis Obispo, CA	Cal Poly	2–1	11,075
35	November 4, 2011	Santa Barbara, CA	UCSB (17)	2–0	13,822
36	October 19, 2012	Santa Barbara, CA	Cal Poly	2–1 ^{OT}	13,467
37	November 3, 2012	San Luis Obispo, CA	Cal Poly	1–0	11,075
38	October 25, 2013	San Luis Obispo, CA	Cal Poly	1–1 ^{2OT}	11,075
39	November 9, 2013	Santa Barbara, CA	UCSB (12)	2–0	12,805
40	October 25, 2014	Santa Barbara, CA	Cal Poly	2–2 ^{2OT}	14,345
41	November 2, 2014	San Luis Obispo, CA	UCSB	2–0	11,075
42	October 17, 2015	San Luis Obispo, CA	Cal Poly	3–2 ^{2OT}	11,075
43	October 24, 2015	Santa Barbara, CA	Cal Poly (23)	2–2 ^{2OT}	14,919
44	October 15, 2016	San Luis Obispo, CA	UCSB	2–1	11,075
45	October 22, 2016	Santa Barbara, CA	Tie	0–0 ^{2OT}	11,424
46	October 14, 2017	Santa Barbara, CA	Tie	0–0 ^{2OT}	10,293
47	October 29, 2017	San Luis Obispo, CA	Cal Poly	4–1	11,075
48	September 30, 2018	San Luis Obispo, CA	Cal Poly	1–0	11,075
49	October 27, 2018	Santa Barbara, CA	UCSB	2–0	7,318
50	October 5, 2019	Santa Barbara, CA	UCSB	3–1	9,748
51	November 2, 2019	San Luis Obispo, CA	UCSB	2–0	11,075
52	September 25, 2021	Santa Barbara, CA	UCSB	2–0	8,000
53	October 16, 2021	San Luis Obispo, CA	Tie	0–0 ^{2OT}	10,899
54	September 21, 2022	San Luis Obispo, CA	UCSB	2–1	10,392
55	October 22, 2022	Santa Barbara, CA	Tie	1–1	7,535
56	September 23, 2023	Santa Barbara, CA	UCSB	2–0	7,032
57	October 15, 2023	San Luis Obispo, CA	UCSB	1–0	8,128
58	September 28, 2024	San Luis Obispo, CA	Cal Poly	2–0	9,657
59	October 6, 2024	Santa Barbara, CA	Tie	0–0	9,985
Series: UCSB leads 31–20–8

== Men's basketball ==
- Note: NCAA Division I play only
- Series table does not include results prior to the 1949–50 NCAA men's basketball season

Cal Poly victories	UCSB victories	Tie games

No.	Date	Location	Winner	Score
1	December 22, 1994	Santa Barbara, CA	UCSB	83–50
2	January 11, 1997	San Luis Obispo, CA	Cal Poly	60–51
3	February 22, 1997	Santa Barbara, CA	UCSB	92–88
4	January 22, 1998	Santa Barbara, CA	Cal Poly	68–66
5	February 22, 1998	San Luis Obispo, CA	Cal Poly	102–96
6	January 20, 1999	San Luis Obispo, CA	UCSB	78–75
7	February 20, 1999	Santa Barbara, CA	UCSB	82–74
8	February 3, 2000	San Luis Obispo, CA	UCSB	87–79
9	February 23, 2000	Santa Barbara, CA	UCSB	79–69
10	February 10, 2001	Santa Barbara, CA	UCSB	95–88
11	February 22, 2001	San Luis Obispo, CA	UCSB	84–77
12	January 19, 2002	San Luis Obispo, CA	UCSB	74–67
13	February 16, 2002	Santa Barbara, CA	UCSB	69–66
14	March 7, 2002	Anaheim, CA	UCSB	74–65
15	January 25, 2003	Santa Barbara, CA	UCSB	70–61
16	February 20, 2003	San Luis Obispo, CA	Cal Poly	66–63
17	March 14, 2003	Anaheim, CA	Cal Poly	67–52
18	January 17, 2004	San Luis Obispo, CA	UCSB	78–59
19	February 14, 2004	Santa Barbara, CA	UCSB	73–53
20	January 13, 2005	Santa Barbara, CA	UCSB	76–56
21	February 19, 2005	San Luis Obispo, CA	UCSB	78–66
22	January 21, 2006	San Luis Obispo, CA	Cal Poly	74–62
23	February 15, 2006	Santa Barbara, CA	UCSB	74–37
24	March 9, 2006	Anaheim, CA	Cal Poly	57–50
25	January 20, 2007	Santa Barbara, CA	Cal Poly	71–61
26	February 14, 2007	San Luis Obispo, CA	Cal Poly	86–79
27	January 19, 2008	San Luis Obispo, CA	UCSB	75–60
28	February 14, 2008	Santa Barbara, CA	UCSB	60–47
29	January 17, 2009	San Luis Obispo, CA	UCSB	72–62
30	February 14, 2009	Santa Barbara, CA	UCSB	68–66
31	January 28, 2010	Santa Barbara, CA	UCSB	80–57
32	February 27, 2010	San Luis Obispo, CA	Cal Poly	60–57
33	January 27, 2011	San Luis Obispo, CA	UCSB	71–70
34	March 5, 2011	Santa Barbara, CA	UCSB	49–43
35	January 2, 2012	San Luis Obispo, CA	UCSB	58–57

No.	Date	Location	Winner	Score
36	February 25, 2012	Santa Barbara, CA	UCSB	68–60
37	March 9, 2012	Anaheim, CA	UCSB	64–52
38	January 19, 2013	Santa Barbara, CA	UCSB	83–81
39	February 16, 2013	San Luis Obispo, CA	Cal Poly	67–49
40	January 11, 2014	Santa Barbara, CA	Cal Poly	72–64
41	March 8, 2014	San Luis Obispo, CA	UCSB	71–55
42	March 13, 2014	Anaheim, CA	Cal Poly	69–38
43	January 10, 2015	San Luis Obispo, CA	UCSB	50–45
44	March 7, 2015	Santa Barbara, CA	UCSB	64–56
45	March 12, 2015	Anaheim, CA	UCSB	54–50
46	January 14, 2016	San Luis Obispo, CA	UCSB	76–73
47	March 5, 2016	Santa Barbara, CA	UCSB	69–50
48	January 14, 2017	Santa Barbara, CA	UCSB	58–53
49	March 4, 2017	San Luis Obispo, CA	UCSB	57–44
50	January 4, 2018	San Luis Obispo, CA	Cal Poly	80–79
51	March 3, 2018	Santa Barbara, CA	UCSB	86–61
52	March 8, 2018	Anaheim, CA	UCSB	75–53
53	January 9, 2019	Santa Barbara, CA	UCSB	65–56
54	March 9, 2019	San Luis Obispo, CA	UCSB	92–82
55	January 8, 2020	San Luis Obispo, CA	UCSB	63–45
56	March 7, 2020	Santa Barbara, CA	UCSB	69–67
57	March 5, 2021	Santa Barbara, CA	UCSB	71–57
58	March 6, 2021	Santa Barbara, CA	UCSB	70–54
59	February 12, 2022	San Luis Obispo, CA	UCSB	69–64
60	January 7, 2023	San Luis Obispo, CA	UCSB	62–57
61	February 2, 2023	Santa Barbara, CA	UCSB	68–62
62	March 9, 2023	Henderson, NV	UCSB	64–54
63	January 6, 2024	San Luis Obispo, CA	UCSB	61–52
64	February 29, 2024	Santa Barbara, CA	UCSB	83–75
65	January 11, 2025	San Luis Obispo, CA	UCSB	75–72
66	February 27, 2025	Santa Barbara, CA	UCSB	96–77
67	January 22, 2026	Santa Barbara, CA	UCSB	107–67
68	February 14, 2026	San Luis Obispo, CA	Cal Poly	89–79
69				
Series: UCSB leads 53–15

== [Discontinued] Aggregate All-Sports Results (Formalized rivalry era) ==
School year	Champion	Score	Record
2009–2010	UC Santa Barbara	12–10	UCSB 1–0
2010–2011	?	?	?
2011–2012	UC Santa Barbara	14–12	UCSB 2–0
2012–2013	UC Santa Barbara	15–14	UCSB 3–0
2013–2014	UC Santa Barbara	13–12	UCSB 4–0
2014–2015	UC Santa Barbara	18–11	UCSB 5–0
2015–2016	UC Santa Barbara	15–10	UCSB 6–0
2016–2017	UC Santa Barbara	14–10	UCSB 7–0
2017–2018	UC Santa Barbara	13–11	UCSB 8–0
2018–2019	UC Santa Barbara	15–10	UCSB 9–0
2019–2020	UC Santa Barbara	10–4	UCSB 10–0
2020–2021	Canceled	—	—
