= Bryan Byrne (footballer) =

Irish footballer (born 1982)

Personal information
- Date of birth: 26 August 1982 (age 44)
- Place of birth: Kilkenny, Ireland
- Height: 5 ft 8 in (1.73 m)
- Position: Midfielder

Youth career
- Castle Villa
- Colaiste Lorcain

College career
Years	Team	Apps	(Gls)
2003–2006	UC Santa Barbara Gauchos	77	(11)

Senior career*
Years	Team	Apps	(Gls)
2002–2003	Kildare County	7	(0)
2006	San Fernando Valley Quakes	4	(2)
2007	New England Revolution	1	(0)
2008–2009	Ventura County Fusion	22	(1)
Total		34	(3)
- * Club domestic league appearances and goals

Bryan Byrne (born 26 August 1982) is an Irish former professional footballer who played as a midfielder in Europe and the United States.

== Early life and education ==
Byrne was born on 26 August 1982, in Kilkenny, Ireland, and was raised in Castledermot. He started his career at local club Castle Villa A.F.C., where he played from U-10's through U-18's.

Byrne was signed by Dermot Keely to play senior-level soccer for Kildare County F.C. for the 2002–03 season. Byrne's stay was short, as Keely's son, Alan Keely, was returning from playing college soccer in Santa Barbara and Dermot recommended Byrne as a player to target. He appeared 7 total times for the club.

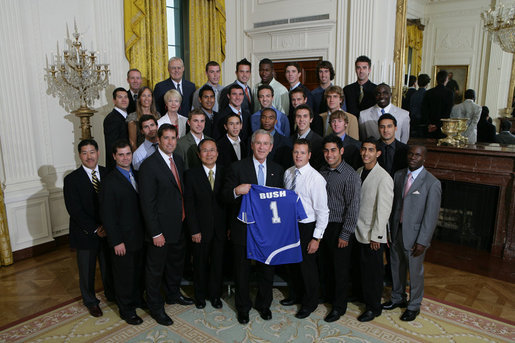
Byrne and the 2006 UCSB Gauchos soccer team honoured at the White House.

Byrne moved to the US and enrolled at the University of California, Santa Barbara, where he was a student-athlete for the UC Santa Barbara Gauchos men's soccer team. He appeared in 77 games for UCSB throughout his four-year career, scoring 11 goals and assisting on 19 others. Byrne and UCSB won the 2006 NCAA Division I Men's Soccer Championship and he was selected to the all-College Cup team.

While enrolled at UCSB, Byrne also played with San Fernando Valley Quakes of the USL Premier Development League, scoring two goals in four appearances.

== Playing career ==
Byrne was drafted in the third round (38th overall) of the 2007 MLS SuperDraft by the New England Revolution and manager Steve Nicol, a former Liverpool player. There had been talk before the draft that Byrne would be drafted and sign with Los Angeles Galaxy, but a disagreement over his playing position and the signing of David Beckham resulted in the team passing on him.

Byrne signed a contract with the Revolution in April 2007, after the Revolution cleared roster space by waiving former UCSB teammate Tony Lochhead. He would mainly feature for the New England Reserves team, but made his MLS debut against Real Salt Lake on 2 June 2007.

Byrne left New England Revolution at the end of the year and subsequently signed for Ventura County Fusion. Byrne played two seasons with Fusion, helping them to the USL Premier Development League championship in 2009. He was released by Fusion at the end of 2009 due to the PDL's age restrictions.

== Post-playing career ==
Byrne has appeared for a number of amateur teams including Hollywood United F.C., Los Angeles Celtic, and Doxa Italia. Byrne was Doxa Italia's first ever goal scorer in the Lamar Hunt Open Cup.

Byrne owns and runs a website where he talks about soccer cleats, SoccerCleats101.

== Honours ==
Ventura County Fusion

- USL Premier Development League: 2009

UC Santa Barbara

- NCAA Men's Division I Soccer Championship: 2006
