= Neil Jones (footballer) =

New Zealand footballer

Personal information
- Full name: Neil Warren Jones
- Date of birth: 16 February 1982 (age 44)
- Place of birth: Takapuna, New Zealand
- Height: 6 ft 4 in (1.93 m)
- Position: Forward

Team information
- Current team: Wisconsin Badgers (head coach)

Youth career
- Westlake Boys High School

College career
Years	Team	Apps	(Gls)
2001–2004	UC Santa Barbara Gauchos	75	(36)

Senior career*
Years	Team	Apps	(Gls)
2004	Cape Cod Crusaders	9	(3)
2005	East Coast Bays AFC		
2005	Queensland Roar FC	0	(0)
2005	Kuala Lumpur FA		

International career
1999	New Zealand U17	3	(0)
- New Zealand U20
- New Zealand U23
2004	New Zealand	2	(1 (Note: FIFA and the Oceania Football Confederation have credited Jones with one international goal while multiple other sources, including Soccer America, ESPN, and The Age, have credited him with two; the discrepancy surrounds the goal scored in the 87/88th minute of New Zealand's 10–0 victory over Tahiti on 4 June 2004 which FIFA/OFC awarded to Ryan Nelsen.))

Managerial career
- 2006–2009: UC Santa Barbara Gauchos (assistant)
- 2010–2012: Northwestern Wildcats (assistant/associate)
- 2013–2021: Loyola Ramblers
- 2022–: Wisconsin
- * Club domestic league appearances and goals

Neil Warren Jones (born 16 February 1982) is a New Zealand collegiate soccer coach and former professional footballer. Jones is the current head coach of the Wisconsin Badgers men's soccer team at the University of Wisconsin–Madison.

== Early life and education ==
Jones was born 16 February 1982 in Takapuna, New Zealand, to parents Fran and Barry Jones. Growing up in New Zealand, he spent time with many football clubs, among them Rangitoto (Juniors), East Coast Bays AFC, Dunedin Technical, Waitakere City F.C., and Westlake Boys High School. He would later attend the University of Otago briefly before transferring to the University of California, Santa Barbara.

While at UCSB, Jones was a student-athlete on the UC Santa Barbara Gauchos men's soccer team, studying in the nationally-ranked UCSB Geography Program. Alongside fellow Kiwi freshman defender Tony Lochhead, Jones appeared in 14 games, scoring 3 goals and adding an assist. He was moved in his second year from defense to forward by coach Tim Vom Steeg. As a forward, Jones led the attack for the Gauchos and culminated in an appearance of the 2004 NCAA Division I Men's Soccer Championship final match, losing on penalties. For his UCSB career, Jones appeared in 75 games and scored 36 goals with 15 assists.

== Playing career ==
While enrolled at UCSB, Jones appeared for Cape Cod Crusaders of the USL PDL. In 2004 alongside Gaucho teammate Drew McAthy, Jones appeared in 9 games and scored 3 goals.

After leaving Santa Barbara, Jones went on trial with European clubs, including Atlético Madrid and Aalesunds FK, in hopes of securing a professional contract. While with Aalesunds FK, the training staff were impressed with his play and wanted Jones to play in front of manager Ivar Morten Normark, who had been out on holiday. He appeared in a friendly match for Aalesunds against IL Hødd, but he was forced to leave just minutes from the start after fracturing his leg, ending his trial with the club.

After rehabbing from his injury, Jones spent time with East Coast Bays AFC. He later signed a short-term contract with Queensland Roar FC of the A-League. Jones was unable to find his way on to the opening day roster and never competed in a league game for Queensland.

He spent time with Kuala Lumpur FA of the Malaysia Premier League before ending his playing career in 2005.

=== International career ===
Neil has represented New Zealand at the U17, U20, U23, and Senior International squads. As a member of the New Zealand U17 "dream team", Jones competed in the 1999 FIFA U-17 World Championship held in New Zealand. He appeared in all three of New Zealand's Group A games, but New Zealand failed to advance.

Jones was named to the New Zealand senior international team for the 2004 OFC Nations Cup for 2006 FIFA World Cup qualification. He debuted on 4 June 2004 against Tahiti national football team and scored a goal.^{A} His last appearance was two days later on 6 June against Fiji.

== Coaching career ==
It was announced in March 2006 that Jones was added to the UC Santa Barbara Gauchos men's soccer team coaching staff by Tim Vom Steeg as an assistant coach. The team would go on to win the 2006 NCAA Division I Men's Soccer Championship.

After four seasons at his alma mater, Jones moved on to be an assistant coach at Northwestern University in Evanston, Illinois, under Tim Lenahan. Ahead of the 2012 season, Jones was promoted to associate head coach.

On 20 December 2012, Jones was introduced as the head coach of Loyola University Chicago's men's soccer team.

On 10 January 2022, Jones was hired as the head coach of the Wisconsin Badgers men's soccer team, replacing John Trask.

== Record by year ==
Record table
Season	Coach	Overall	Conference	Standing	Postseason
Loyola Chicago Ramblers (Missouri Valley Conference) (2013–2021)
2013	Loyola Chicago	6–11–2	2–3–1	5th	
2014	Loyola Chicago	8–6–5	2–2–2	5th	
2015	Loyola Chicago	10–4–5	2–2–2	5th	
2016	Loyola Chicago	14–4–1	6–1–1	1st	NCAA 2nd round
2017	Loyola Chicago	7–8–3	3–4–1	T–4th	
2018	Loyola Chicago	10–7–2	3–1–2	2nd	
2019	Loyola Chicago	11–5–4	5–2–3	2nd	NCAA 1st round
2020	Loyola Chicago	7–4–2	5–2–1	T–2nd	
2021	Loyola Chicago	9–5–2	6–3–1	2nd	
Loyola Chicago:		82–54–26 (.586)	34–20–14 (.603)		
Wisconsin Badgers (Big Ten Conference) (2022–present)
2022	Wisconsin	6–6–4	3–4–1	T–6th	
2023	Wisconsin	6–5–6	2–2–4	8th	
2024	Wisconsin	7–5–3	2–5–3	9th	
2025	Wisconsin	8–8–0	4–6–0	6th	
2026	Wisconsin	0–0–0	0–0–0		
Wisconsin:		27–24–13 (.523)	11–17–8 (.417)		
Total:		109–78–39 (.569)			
National champion Postseason invitational champion Conference regular season champion Conference regular season and conference tournament champion Division regular season champion Division regular season and conference tournament champion Conference tournament champion
