= 2002 NCAA Division I men's soccer tournament =

Men's College Cup (semifinals & final)

Tournament details
- Country: United States
- Teams: 48

Final positions
- Champions: UCLA (4th title)
- Runners-up: Stanford (2nd title game)

Tournament statistics
- Matches played: 47
- Goals scored: 125 (2.66 per match)
- Attendance: 62,280 (1,325 per match)
- Top goal scorer(s): Matt Taylor, UCLA (5)

Awards
- Best player: Aaron Lopez, UCLA (MOP offense); Zach Wells, UCLA (MOP defense)

The 2002 NCAA Division I men's soccer tournament was the 43rd organized men's college soccer tournament by the National Collegiate Athletic Association, to determine the top college soccer team in the United States. The UCLA Bruins won their fourth national title by defeating the Stanford Cardinal in the championship game, 1–0. The final match was played on December 15, 2002, in University Park, Texas at Gerald J. Ford Stadium on the campus of Southern Methodist University, as were the two semifinals on December 13. All earlier-round games were played at the home field of the higher seeded team.

== Seeded Teams ==
National seeds
Seed	School	Record
#1	Wake Forest	14–1–4
#2	Maryland	17–4
#3	UCLA	13–3–3
#4	St. John's (NY)	12–2–5
#5	Boston College	16–4
#6	Virginia	15–6
#7	Connecticut	15–5
#8	VCU	15–4–1

== Bracket ==
=== Regional 1 ===
First round
Old Dominion	3
Richmond	0
South Carolina	1
Coastal Carolina (2OT)	2
Portland	2
Oregon State	0
Furman	2
Loyola (MD)	0

Second round
1	Wake Forest	1
Old Dominion	0
Coastal Carolina	1
Clemson (pen.)	1
Stanford (pen.)	0
Portland	0
Furman (pen.)	0
8	VCU	0

Regional semifinals
1	Wake Forest	1
Clemson (OT)	2
Stanford (2OT)	2
Furman	1

Regional Finals
Clemson	0
Stanford	2

=== Regional 2 ===
First round
Lehigh	1
Northeastern (pen.)	1
FIU	2
UCF	1
UW Milwaukee	2
Oakland	1
Holy Cross	1
Fairleigh Dickinson (pen.)	1

Second round
5	Boston College	2
Northeastern	1
FIU	1
SMU	3
Creighton	3
Milwaukee	2
Fairleigh Dickinson	1
4	St. John's (NY) (2OT)	2

Regional semifinals
5	Boston College (pen.)	4
SMU	4
Creighton (OT)	1
4	St. John's (NY)	0

Regional Finals
5	Boston College	2
Creighton	6

=== Regional 3 ===
First round
Loyola Marymount	1
Cal State Northridge	0
UC Santa Barbara	2
San Diego	0
North Carolina	6
Winthrop	0
William & Mary	2
Duke	1

Second round
3	UCLA	4
Loyola Marymount	2
UC Santa Barbara	1
California	2
Penn State (2OT)	1
North Carolina	0
William & Mary (pen.)	1
6	Virginia	1

Regional semifinals
3	UCLA	3
California	2
Penn State (OT)	1
William & Mary	0

Regional Finals
3	UCLA	7
Penn State	1

=== Regional 4 ===
First round
Penn (OT)	1
Seton Hall	0
Notre Dame	3
Akron	1
Bradley	1
New Mexico	2
American	1
George Washington	0

Second round
7	Connecticut	4
Penn	0
Notre Dame	0
Indiana	1
Saint Louis	1
New Mexico	0
American	0
2	Maryland	1

Regional semifinals
7	Connecticut	1
Indiana	0
Saint Louis	0
2	Maryland (OT)	1

Regional Finals
7	Connecticut	0
2	Maryland	3

=== Final Four – Gerald J. Ford Stadium, University Park, Texas ===
National semifinals December 13
—	Stanford (2OT)	1
—	Creighton	0
3	UCLA	2
2	Maryland	1

National Championship; December 15
—	Stanford	0
3	UCLA	1

December 15, 2002
11:00 AM PT

UCLA	1–0	Stanford
López 89'	Report

Gerald J. Ford Stadium, Dallas, Texas
Attendance: 8,498
Referee: Brian Hall
