= Alan Keely =

Irish footballer (1982–2021)

Personal information
- Full name: Alan Vincent Keely
- Date of birth: 10 May 1982
- Place of birth: Dublin, Ireland
- Date of death: 3 May 2021 (aged 38)
- Place of death: Ireland
- Height: 6 ft 3 in (1.91 m)
- Position: Defender

Youth career
- St Joseph's C.B.S.

College career
Years	Team	Apps	(Gls)
2002	UC Santa Barbara Gauchos	22	(1)

Senior career*
Years	Team	Apps	(Gls)
2001–2002	Shelbourne	0	(0)
2003	Kildare County	15	(0)
2004	Dublin City		
2004	Finn Harps	8	(0)
2005–2006	Dublin City		
2006–2007	Waterford United	21	(0)
2007–2009	Shelbourne	57	(1)
2010	Malahide United		

International career
- Ireland U16
- Ireland U17
- * Club domestic league appearances and goals

Alan Vincent Keely (10 May 1982 – 3 May 2021) was an Irish footballer who played as a defender for several League of Ireland teams between 2001 and 2009, including Shelbourne F.C., Finn Harps F.C. and Waterford United F.C. He was a member of the Finn Harps' squad that won the 2004 League of Ireland First Division.

== Early life and education ==
Keely was born on 10 May 1982 in Dublin, Ireland. The son of former League of Ireland player and manager, Dermot Keely, he attended St. Joseph's CBS and was named as an All-Ireland schoolboy defender.

Keely attended the University of California, Santa Barbara (UCSB) and was a student-athlete on scholarship with the UC Santa Barbara Gauchos men's soccer team. In 2002, his only season with the team, he appeared in 22 games and scored 1 goal with 2 assists. The Gauchos appeared in the 2002 NCAA Division I Men's Soccer Championship, which was the first time the school had participated in the tournament. He was named as the 2002 Big West Conference's Freshman of the Year and was placed on the All-Conference First Team.

== Playing career ==
Before attending UCSB, Keely began his senior career with Shelbourne F.C. in 2001 who was then under the management of his father, Dermot. He made one senior appearance for Shelbourne in 2001–02 season during a League of Ireland Cup match against Shamrock Rovers on 29 October 2001.

Keely left Santa Barbara after his first season, returning to Ireland. It was announced in January 2003 that he signed with Kildare County F.C. for the 2003 League of Ireland season. He suffered a serious groin injury mid-season and finished the season with 15 appearances for the club.

Ahead of the 2004 League of Ireland season, Keely joined Dublin City F.C. as a free agent. Unable to crack the first team squad, he was transfer listed, then released, by manager Roddy Collins. Despite interest from Dundalk F.C. manager Jim Gannon, Keely signed with Finn Harps F.C. shortly after. He featured for Finn Harps to close out the season.

With his father Dermot named manager at Dublin City, Keely rejoined the club in November 2004 for the forthcoming 2005 League of Ireland season. He remained with Dublin City through July 2006 when, 17 league games into the season, the club stopped trading and ceased to exist as a football team.

After the club's demise, Waterford United F.C. signed Keely and two of his Dublin City teammates in August 2006. In December 2006, he re-signed for another year with Waterford for the 2007 League of Ireland.

In July 2007, Keely re-joined Shelbourne F.C. He departed the club at the end of the 2009 season. In his three seasons at Shelbourne, Keely made 61 league and cup appearances and scored one goal.

== Later career and death ==
After his League of Ireland career ended, Keely joined Leinster Senior League side Malahide United F.C. for the 2010 season.

Keely died in May 2021 at the age of 38.

== Awards and honours ==
Finn Harps

- League of Ireland First Division: 2004
