= UC Santa Barbara Gauchos men's soccer =

American college soccer team

- Founded: 1966; 60 years ago
- University: University of California, Santa Barbara
- Athletic director: Kelly Barsky
- Head coach: Tim Vom Steeg (25th season)
- Conference: Big West
- Location: Santa Barbara, California, US
- Stadium: Harder Stadium (capacity: 17,000)
- Nickname: Gauchos
- Colors: Blue and gold
Home	Away

NCAA tournament championships
- 2006

NCAA tournament runner-up
- 2004

NCAA tournament College Cup
- 2004, 2006

NCAA tournament Quarterfinals
- 2004, 2006, 2019

NCAA tournament Round of 16
- 2003, 2004, 2006, 2007, 2009, 2011, 2015, 2019

NCAA tournament appearances
- 2002, 2003, 2004, 2005, 2006, 2007, 2008, 2009, 2010, 2011, 2013, 2015, 2019, 2021, 2024

Conference tournament championships
- 2010, 2021

Conference regular season championships
- 2001, 2002, 2004, 2006, 2007, 2009, 2013, 2014, 2015, 2016, 2021, 2025*

The UC Santa Barbara Gauchos men's soccer team is an NCAA Division I college soccer team composed of student-athletes attending the University of California, Santa Barbara. The Gauchos play their home matches at Harder Stadium. Like most of the other UC Santa Barbara Gauchos athletic teams, the men's soccer team competes in the Big West Conference. After the 2026–27 school year, UCSB will leave the Big West for the West Coast Conference.

The UCSB Gauchos won the 2006 NCAA Division I Men's Soccer Championship. The program has produced 19 All-American selections, all but one of which since 2002, and over 60 players who have gone on to play professionally or represent their senior national teams.

Each season from 2007 to 2015, the Gauchos were recognized by the NCAA as the men's attendance champions by average attendance (men's and women's inclusive across Division I, II, and III) – the longest such recorded streak in the NCAA record books. The program holds the top six all-time NCAA soccer records for largest regular season attendances at on-campus venues (men's and women's inclusive across Division I, II, and III). This is highlighted by the top all-time mark of 15,896 fans packed into Harder Stadium on September 24, 2010, when UC Santa Barbara hosted UCLA for their regular season match, despite the Santa Barbara County Fire Marshal turning fans away at the gates for fear of filling the stadium over capacity.

== History ==
=== Humble beginnings ===
UC Santa Barbara fielded its first men's soccer team in 1966 but didn't compete in the Big West Conference until 1983. The Gauchos had mixed success, with good seasons (1983, 1988) alongside bad seasons (1991, 1992), but never found prolonged stretches of success or failure.

The Big West Conference stopped sponsoring men's soccer after the 1991 season but re-instituted it before the 2001 season. During this period, UCSB competed in the Mountain Pacific Sports Federation. The return of soccer to the Big West Conference marked the rough beginning of the Gauchos' greatest success to date.

=== Vom Steeg era ===
In January 1999, UC Santa Barbara's athletic director, Gary Cunningham, was successfully able to hire former UCSB and professional soccer player, Tim Vom Steeg, away from Santa Barbara City College to lead the Gauchos' program. The Gauchos won the 2001 Big West Conference championship for the first time in their history, but missed out on a trip to the NCAA Tournament since the Big West Conference was ineligible for an automatic bid. UC Santa Barbara have won eight Big West regular season championships (2001, 2002, 2004, 2006, 2007, 2009, 2013, 2014) and have won the Big West tournament in 2010.

==== 2004 NCAA Championships ====
The Gauchos burst onto the national scene in 2004 during their run at the 2004 NCAA Championship. The showing in this tournament established UC Santa Barbara as a force in college soccer, with UCSB marching to the finals before losing out on penalties to Indiana.

==== 2006 NCAA Championships ====
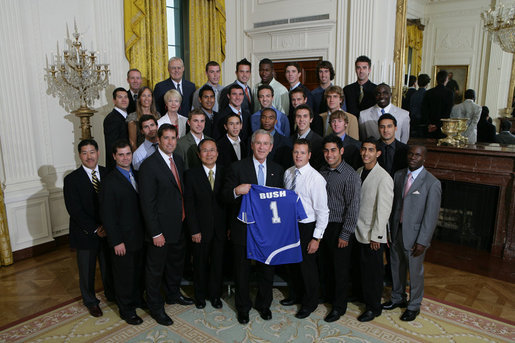
Santa Barbara national champions visiting president George W. Bush (who is posing with a #1 shirt with his name) at the White House in 2006

The crowning achievement of the men's soccer program took place in 2006, when UCSB won the NCAA Division I Championship in a 2–1 decision over UCLA. It marked the program's first championship and only the university's second athletics championship (1979 Men's Water Polo).

At one point during the season, UCSB's record stood at 7–6 with dim prospects for postseason glory. However, a 5–1 stretch to close the regular season raised morale. The Gauchos made the NCAA Tournament as an unseeded team. During their championship run, the unseeded Gauchos defeated San Diego State at home, then #1 ranked/#3 seeded SMU followed by Old Dominion on the road, and finally Northwestern before an NCAA season-high 8,784 people at Harder Stadium in Santa Barbara. This propelled the Gauchos into the Final Four and earned them a trip to the College Cup held at Hermann Stadium in St. Louis, Missouri.

UCSB needed extra time to defeat #2 seed Wake Forest 0–0 (4–3 on penalties) in their first match of the College Cup. The final was a matchup between Southern California teams as UCLA advanced on a 4–0 win over Virginia. The 8th-ranked and seeded Bruins served as the final team to fall to the Gauchos by a score of 2–1 to complete UCSB's magical season.

== Players ==
=== Current squad ===
As of September 1, 2026

Note: Flags indicate national team as defined under FIFA eligibility rules; some limited exceptions apply. Players may hold more than one non-FIFA nationality.

No.	Pos.	Nation	Player
1	GK	USA	Owen Beninga
2	DF	CAN	Colby Renton
3	DF	USA	Cole Harris
4	DF	SWE	Calle Mollerberg
5	DF	SWE	Viggo Gustavsson
6	MF	DEN	Kalle Rahbek
7	FW	USA	Donovan Sessoms
8	DF	ISR	Peleg Brown
10	MF	ISL	Steinar Bjornsson
11	MF	USA	Kaden Standish
12	MF	USA	Ty Branigan
13	MF	USA	Ethan Senter
15	FW	USA	Owen Wall
16	DF	USA	Jakob Methvin
18	MF	GER	Tobi Gerber

No.	Pos.	Nation	Player
19	DF	USA	Drew Kamienski
20	MF	USA	Jack Middleton
21	FW	USA	Mateos Carvalho
22	MF	NOR	Martin Odegaard Oesthagen
23	DF	ITA	Simone Ferrieri
24	DF	USA	Matteo Crisera
25	FW	SWE	Gunnar Franke
26	GK	USA	Dylan Hotaling
28	MF	USA	Gavin Sampognaro
30	MF	USA	Nate Riner
32	MF	USA	Brennan Mulholland
33	FW	USA	Zac Siebenlist
41	GK	USA	David Ruy
77	DF	USA	Neo Mishan

=== Notable former players ===
- (Ghana) Geoffrey Acheampong (2015)
- (United States) Dion Acoff (2012)
- (England) Fuad Adeniyi (2015)
- (United States) Jaime Ambriz (1999–2001)
- (United States) Memo Arzate (2002–2003)
- (New Zealand) Hunter Ashworth (2018–2019)
- (United States) Eric Avila (2005–2007)
- (Ghana) Fifi Baiden (2010–2013)
- (United States) Danny Barrera (2008–2010)
- (United States) Lamar Batista (2016)
- (Australia) Will Baynham (2019)
- (Mexico) Iván Becerra (2004–2005)
- (New Zealand) Noah Billingsley (2016–2019)
- (Ghana) Ema Boateng (2012)
- (New Zealand) Michael Boxall (2007–2010)
- (United States) Nate Boyden (2001–2005)
- (Republic of Ireland) Bryan Byrne (2003–2006)
- (France) Achille Campion (2012–2013)
- (United States) Joe Cannon (1993)
- (Mexico) Javier Castro (2012–2013)
- (United States) Nick DePuy (2013–2016)
- (United States) Bryan Dominguez (2008)
- (Ghana) Manu Duah (2024)
- (Germany) Paul Ehmann (2013–2014)
- (Canada) Rob Friend (2001–2002)
- (Hong Kong) Ryo Fujii (2014)
- (United States) Kevin Garcia-Lopez (2010–2014)
- (United States) Sam Garza (2010–2011)
- (New Zealand) William Gillingham (2017–2021)
- (England) Andy Iro (2004–2007)
- (The Gambia) Ismaila Jome (2013–2015)
- (New Zealand) Neil Jones (2001–2004)
- (Republic of Ireland) Alan Keely (2002)
- (United States) Dan Kennedy (2001–2004)
- (United States) Ryan Kenny (2005)
- (United States) James Kiffe (2009–2011)
- (United States) Seo-In Kim (2015–2017)
- (New Zealand) Tony Lochhead (2001–2004)
- (Brazil) Thiago Martins (1999–2000)
- (United States) Drew McAthy (2001–2004)
- (Republic of Ireland) David McGill (2002–2003)
- (Republic of Ireland) Peter McGlynn (2008–2012)
- (United States) Reed McKenna (2013–2014)
- (United States) Randy Mendoza (2015–2017)
- (Sierra Leone) Rodney Michael (2017–2020)
- (United States) Bryan Monka (1999–2000)
- (United States) Alfonso Motagalvan (2005–2008)
- (Canada) Michael Nonni (2009–2011)
- (United States) Tino Nuñez (2004–2007)
- (United States) Ciaran O'Brien (2007)
- (Ghana) David Opoku (2010–2011)
- (United States) Dalton Pando (2016)
- (United States) Nick Perera (2005–2008)
- (Philippines) Charley Pettys (2009)
- (United States) Chris Pontius (2005–2008)
- (United States) Christian Ramirez (2009–2010)
- (Canada) Mateo Restrepo (2016–2019)
- (Puerto Rico) Eric Reyes (2010)
- (United States) Kyle Reynish (2002–2006)
- (United States) Ralph Robertson (1993–1995)
- (Canada) Tyler Rosenlund (2004–2006)
- (United States) Ahinga Selemani (2015–2016)
- (United States) Luis Silva (2008–2011)
- (United States) Sam Strong (2015–2016)
- (Ghana) Michael Tetteh (2008–2010)
- (United States) Carson Vom Steeg (2018–2021)
- (United States) Justin Vom Steeg (2015)
- (United States) Tim Vom Steeg (1985–1988)

== Coaching staff ==
=== Current technical staff ===
As of September 1, 2026

Position	Name
Head coach	Tim Vom Steeg
Associate head coach	Greg Wilson
Goalkeeping coach	Matias Fernandez
Assistant coach	Carson Vom Steeg

=== Head coaching history ===
As of August 2026

#	Nat.	Name	Tenure	Record	Win %
1		Zolton von Smogyi	1966–71	30–22–6	.569
2		Sandy Guess	1972–74	14–18–7	.449
3	(United States)	Alan Meeder	1975–78	36–26–4	.576
4		John Purcell	1979–80	15–17–5	.473
5		Andy Kuenzli	1981–89	95–64–21	.586
6		Cliff Draeger	1990–91	15–20–2	.432
7		Mark Arya	1992–98	40–84–6	.331
8	(United States)	Tim Vom Steeg	1999–Present	324–152–76	.660

== Rivalries ==
=== Cal Poly ===
Chosen as the #1 "Greatest Rivalry In College Soccer" by CollegeSoccerNews.com, the main rival of the UC Santa Barbara Gauchos soccer team is the Cal Poly Mustangs men's soccer team. The rivalry is a part of the larger Blue–Green Rivalry, which encompasses all sports from the two schools. With both schools located on the Central Coast less than 100 miles apart, attendance has risen dramatically following the Gauchos' 2006 NCAA Division I Men's Soccer Championship. The crowds of these games are record-setting and are among the highest regular-season games in NCAA college soccer history.

== Titles ==
=== National ===
Championship	Title #	Season	Rival (final)	Score
NCAA tournament	1	2006	UCLA	2–1

=== Conference ===
Conference	Championship	Titles	Winning years
Big West	Tournament	2	2010, 2021
Big West	Regular season	12	2001, 2002, 2004, 2006, 2007, 2009, 2013, 2014, 2015, 2016, 2021, 2025 (Note: Title shared with UC Irvine and Cal Poly)

== NCAA appearances ==
The UC Santa Barbara Gauchos have an NCAA Division I Tournament record of 23–13–1 through fifteen appearances.

Key

- a.e.t. – Match went to extra time
- p – Match decided by a penalty shootout after extra time
- – Won National Championship

Year	Stage	Rival	Res.	Score
2002	First round	San Diego	W	2–0
2002	Second round	California	L	1–2
2003	Second round	California	W	2–0
2003	Third round	St. John's	L	2–3
2004	Second round	Milwaukee	W	2–1
2004	Third round	UNC Greensboro	W	1–0
2004	Quarterfinals	VCU	W	4–1
2004	Semifinals	Duke	W	5–0
2004	Final	Indiana	L	1–2
2005	First round	San Diego State	W	2–0
2005	Second round	CSU Northridge	L	2–3
2006	First round	San Diego State	2–1	
2006	Second round	SMU	W	3–1
2006	Third round	Old Dominion	W	2–1
2006	Quarterfinals	Northwestern	W	3–2
2006	Semifinals	Wake Forest	W	1–0
2006	Final	UCLA	W	2–1
2007	Second round	Washington	W	1–0
2007	Third round	Ohio State	L	3–4
2008	Second round	California	L	2–3
2009	First round	Wofford	W	1–0
2009	Second round	San Diego	W	1–0
2009	Third round	UCLA	L	1–2
2010	First round	Denver	W	1–0
2010	Second round	California	L	1–2
2011	Second round	Providence	W	3–2
2011	Third round	Creighton	L	1–2
2013	Second round	Penn State	L	0–1
2015	Second round	South Carolina	W	1–0
2015	Third round	Clemson	L	2–3
2019	First round	California	W	3–1
2019	Second round	Saint Mary's	W	4–0
2019	Third round	Indiana	W	1–0
2019	Quarterfinals	Wake Forest	L	0–1
2021	First round	UCLA	L	1–2
2024	First round	UCLA	W	1–0
2024	Second round	Stanford	L	2–2 (5–6 p)
