= Tim Vom Steeg =

American soccer player

Personal information
- Full name: Timothy Harold Vom Steeg
- Date of birth: October 29, 1966 (age 59)
- Place of birth: Sacramento County, California, U.S.
- Position: Defender

Youth career
- 1985–1988: UC Santa Barbara Gauchos

Senior career*
| Years | Team | Apps | (Gls) |
| 1989–1990 | Real Santa Barbara | | |

Managerial career
- 1992–1998: Santa Barbara City College
- 1999–: UC Santa Barbara Gauchos
- * Club domestic league appearances and goals

Timothy Harold Vom Steeg (born October 29, 1966) is an American collegiate soccer head coach who is currently with the University of California, Santa Barbara men's soccer team. He has been with the Gauchos since 1999 and is the most successful coach in the history of UC Santa Barbara.

Vom Steeg won the 2006 NCAA Division I Men's Soccer Championship and was runner-up in the 2004 NCAA Division I Men's Soccer Championship with UC Santa Barbara, in addition to being named the 2004 and 2006 NSCAA Coach of the Year.

== Early life and education ==
Vom Steeg was born in Sacramento County, California on October 29, 1966. His parents were missionaries and Vom Steeg was raised at a young age in Brazil where he played and learned the game of soccer. As a teenager, he grew up in Fresno, California and was recruited by Fresno State Bulldogs. Vom Steeg ultimately enrolled at the University of California, Santa Barbara and played for the UC Santa Barbara Gauchos men's soccer team under coach Andy Kuenzli from 1985 to 1988. He graduated in 1989 with a B.A. in history. He later earned a teaching credential from UCSB in 1990.

Upon graduation, Vom Steeg played for Real Santa Barbara from 1989 to 1990. He later went on to teach at Laguna Blanca School while he coached the soccer team at San Marcos High School.

== Coaching career ==
=== Santa Barbara City College ===
Vom Steeg was named head coach of Santa Barbara City College in 1992 after approaching the college regarding their lack of soccer teams and then raising $40,000 to start a men's and women's program. With the Vaqueros, Vom Steeg won five Western State Conference championships, as well as the 1996 California Community College State Championship. Vom Steeg led SBCC to four California State Final Fours in total. The team went 120-18-7 overall under Vom Steeg's reign, which ended in 1998.

Personally, Vom Steeg was named the Western State Conference Coach of the Year five times in his seven seasons. He was also named the California State Coach of the Year in 1996 as well as the NSCAA Far West Region Coach of the Year in 1997.

=== UC Santa Barbara ===
In January 1999, Vom Steeg was hired as the head coach of UC Santa Barbara's men's soccer program. He took the program over from Mark Arya, who from 1992 through 1998 amassed a 40-84-6 (.331) record. Vom Steeg delivered immediate results, improving upon a 2-17-1 (0-8-1 conference) record under Arya's last year in 1998 to finish the 1999 season with a 13-7-0 (4-3-0 conference) record. The feat saw Vom Steeg named an MPSF Pacific Division Co-Coach of the Year.

The following seasons saw the Gauchos steadily improve, culminating in the school's first Big West Conference Championship in 2001, Vom Steeg's third year in charge. Not satisfied with the accomplishments of the team, Vom Steeg improved the 7-2-1 conference record from 2001 and turned it into a 9-0-1 conference record in 2002, giving UC Santa Barbara its second Big West title in a row. 2002 also saw the Gauchos reach the NCAA Tournament for the first time in school history, reaching the 2nd round. In 2003, Vom Steeg and UCSB lost the Big West title to rivals Cal State Northridge, but advanced to the Sweet Sixteen round of the NCAA Tournament.

In 2004, Tim Vom Steeg and UC Santa Barbara were firmly put on the map as a bona fide college soccer powerhouse. The Gauchos compiled an 8-2-0 conference record to recapture the Big West title from Northridge. Vom Steeg led the Gauchos into the 2004 Division I Men's College Cup, reaching the finals against Indiana University in Carson, California before falling on penalties. The showing led to Vom Steeg being named the 2004 NSCAA Coach of the Year.

Vom Steeg became the winningest coach in UCSB soccer history in 2005. He passed his former collegiate coach Andy Kuenzli (1981–89) with his 96th win when the Gauchos defeated UC Davis in double overtime on October 26. He became the first coach in program history to reach the 100-win plateau after he led that squad to a 2–0 victory over San Diego State in the opening round of the NCAA Tournament.

The crowning achievement of Vom Steeg's career came in 2006. The team started slowly with a 7–6 record, but Vom Steeg was able to turn around the fortunes after threatening to start younger players in preparation for the 2007 season. UC Santa Barbara again won the Big West title and made the 2006 Division I Men's College Cup, however this time they were unseeded. After defeating San Diego State and #3 seed SMU among others, the Gauchos made it to the College Cup in St. Louis, Missouri to contend for the national championship. UCSB defeated #2 seed Wake Forest in penalties, advancing to the championship match against #8 seed and Southern California rival UCLA. UC Santa Barbara won the title by a 2–1 scoreline, giving the Gauchos their first ever NCAA Championship in soccer and only 2nd NCAA title overall (1979 Men's Water Polo). Vom Steeg was once again named NSCAA Coach of the Year.

With his success at UC Santa Barbara, Vom Steeg was sought after by other collegiate programs. The NC State Wolfpack men's soccer team made an offer for him to replace their long-time coach, George Tarantini, in 2011 but was not accepted.

On October 8, 2015, Vom Steeg became the first Big West Conference men's soccer coach to reach 100 wins in league play.

UC Santa Barbara had only one All-American player, Dave Hollingsworth in 1970, before Tim Vom Steeg took over the program. Since his tenure began, that number has jumped into double digits. Rob Friend, Memo Arzate, Alan Keely, Drew McAthy, Tony Lochhead, Dan Kennedy, Tyler Rosenlund, Andy Iro, Eric Avila, and Ciaran O'Brien have all won All-America accolades while at UCSB under Vom Steeg.

== Personal life ==
Vom Steeg resides in Santa Barbara, California and is married to Almeria Vom Steeg. They have four sons together (Justin, Carson, and twins Caden and Jared). In 2000, he received a master's degree from UC Santa Barbara.

== Awards and honors ==
=== Santa Barbara City College ===
Winner

- Western State Conference Championship (5)
- California Community College State Championship (1)

Personal awards

- Western State Conference Coach of the Year (5)
- California State Coach of the Year (1): 1996
- NSCAA Far West Region Coach of the Year (1): 1997

=== UC Santa Barbara ===
Winner

- NCAA Men's Soccer Championship (1): 2006
- Big West Conference Championship (5): 2001, 2002, 2004, 2006, 2007, 2010

Runner-up

- NCAA Men's Soccer Championship (1): 2004
- Big West Conference Championship (2): 2003, 2005, 2011

Personal awards

- NSCAA Coach of the Year (2): 2004, 2006
- Big West Conference Coach of the Year (4): 2004, 2005, 2010, 2013
- Mountain Pacific Sports Federation Co-Coach of the Year (1): 1999

== Managerial statistics ==
As of December 31, 2025

| Team | From | To | Record | | | | |
| Team | From | To | G | W | L | D | Win % |
|---|---|---|---|---|---|---|---|
| Santa Barbara City College | 1992 | 1998 | 143 | 121 | 18 | 4 | 84.62 |
| UC Santa Barbara Gauchos | 1999 | Incumbent | 552 | 324 | 152 | 76 | 58.70 |
| Total | | | 695 | 445 | 170 | 80 | 64.03 |
