= 2004 NCAA Division I men's soccer tournament =

Men's College Cup (semifinals & final)

Tournament details
- Country: United States
- Teams: 48

Final positions
- Champions: Indiana (7th title)
- Runners-up: UC Santa Barbara (1st title game)

Tournament statistics
- Matches played: 47
- Attendance: 72,566 (1,544 per match)
- Top goal scorer(s): Ryan Pore, Tulsa (4)

Awards
- Best player: Drew McAthy, UC Santa Barbara (MOP offense); Jay Nolly, Indiana (MOP defense)

The 2004 NCAA Division I men's soccer tournament was a tournament of 48 teams from NCAA Division I. This year's College Cup Final Four was held at the Home Depot Center in Carson, California. All the other games were played at the home field of the higher-seeded team. The final was held on December 12, 2004. Duke, Maryland, UC Santa Barbara, and Indiana qualified for the Final Four. UC Santa Barbara beat Duke and Indiana beat Maryland. In the final Indiana beat UC Santa Barbara in a penalty shoot-out following a 1–1 regulation tie and two scoreless overtimes.

The tournament began on November 18, 2004. The first round was played on November 18, 19 and 20. The second round followed on November 23, and the third round on November 27 and 28. The Regional Finals were played on November 3–5.

== Seeded teams ==
Seed	School	Record
#1	Wake Forest	13–5–1
#2	Indiana	14–4–1
#3	Maryland	15–5–1
#4	Virginia	17–4–0
#5	Notre Dame	13–2–3
#6	St. John's (NY)	13–3–2
#7	SMU	13–3–2
#8	UNC-Greensboro	18–2–1
#9	UC Santa Barbara	17–2–1
#10	Penn State	10–4–7
#11	UCLA	10–5–4
#12	Old Dominion	13–5–2
#13	New Mexico	16–1–1
#14	Creighton	13–4–1
#15	Boston College	12–4–2
#16	VCU	11–5–2

== Regional 1 ==
First round
Florida International	0
Central Florida	1
North Carolina	0
George Washington	1
San Francisco	2
UW Milwaukee	3
South Carolina	2
College of Charleston	3

Second round
Central Florida	0
1	Wake Forest	5
16	VCU	2
George Washington	0
Wisconsin-Milwaukee	1
9	UC Santa Barbara	2/2OT
8	UNC-Greensboro	3
College of Charleston	2

Regional semifinals
1	Wake Forest	2/(2)
16	VCU	2/(3)
9	UC Santa Barbara	1
8	UNC-Greensboro	0/OT

Regional Finals
16	VCU	1
9	UC Santa Barbara	4

== Regional 2 ==
First round
Ohio State	1
Memphis	0
Duke	3
Coastal Carolina	0
Washington	3
Portland	5'
American	3
Long Island	0

Second round
Ohio State	2
5	Notre Dame	1
12	Old Dominion	0
Duke	1/OT
Portland	1
13	New Mexico	4
4	Virginia	2
American	1

Regional semifinals
UR	Ohio State	0
UR	Duke	3
13	New Mexico	1
4	Virginia	1/PK

Regional Finals
UR	Duke	3
4	Virginia	0

== Regional 3 ==
First round
Hofstra	2
Seton Hall	1
Western Illinois	1
Northwestern	3
Dartmouth	2
Boston	2/PK
Cal State-Northridge	0
Loyola-Marymount	1

Second round
Hofstra	0
3	Maryland	4
14	Creighton	3
Northwestern	2
Boston	1
11	St. John's	3
6	UCLA	1
Loyola-Marymount	0

Regional semifinals
3	Maryland	0
14	Creighton	0/PK
11	St. John's, NY	2
6	UCLA	1

Regional Finals
3	Maryland	1
11	St. John's	0

== Regional 4 ==
First round
Santa Clara	1
California	2/OT
Michigan State	1
Tulsa	3
Connecticut	2
Marist	1/OT
Akron	1
Michigan	2

Second round
California	0
7	Southern Methodist	1
10	Penn State	1
Tulsa	1/PK
Connecticut	0
15	Boston College	1
2	Indiana	1
Michigan	0

Regional semifinals
7	Southern Methodist	1
UR	Tulsa	2/2OT
15	Boston College	0
2	Indiana	1

Regional Finals
UR	Tulsa	0
2	Indiana	4

== Summary ==
A crowd of over 10,000 (led by a large number of UCSB alumni in the Los Angeles area and many others who made the 100 mile drive from Santa Barbara) filed into the Home Depot Center for the semifinals. In the opener between Maryland and Indiana, the game was tied at 2 and appeared like it would be decided on penalties, but Indiana scored in the final minute of the second overtime. In the 2nd game, UCSB scored in the first minute against a Duke team that had yet to allow a goal in the tournament. The Gauchos scored again to take a 2–0 into halftime. Early in the 2nd half, Tony Lochhead scored on a free kick from 35 yards out and UCSB add a couple of late goals for a 5–0 victory.

A crowd of nearly 13,000 attended the final between Indiana and UCSB. Early in the year, UCSB defeated Indiana and the Hoosiers had some harsh words about the Gauchos' aggressive and physical style of play. In the final, Indiana scored first and it looked like it might hold up but UCSB equalized late in the game. In the first overtime, Lochead took a corner kick for UCSB and Andy Iro got a head on the ball, sending it skimming over the cross bar. That was as close as either team came to scoring, so the matter was decided on penalties.

UCSB controversially replaced All American goalie Dan Kennedy with Kyle Reynish because of Reynish's 6'4" frame, and the move appeared to pay off as he stopped 2 Indiana penalties. But UCSB penalty takers were having problems of their own, as Indiana keeper Jay Nolly made one save, and another shot missed the net. On the 5th round, Indiana scored to take a 3–2 lead, then UCSB had the final shot saved by Nolly again to secure the Championship for a second straight year.

== Final Four – Home Depot Center, Carson, CA ==
National semifinals December 10
9	UC Santa Barbara	5
Duke	0
3	Maryland	2
2	Indiana	3/2OT

National Championship; December 12
9	UC Santa Barbara	1/(2)
2	Indiana	1/(3)

December 12, 2004

Indiana	1–1	UC Santa Barbara
Peterson 26:23'	Report	McAthy 81:01'
Penalties
	3–2

Home Depot Center, Carson, California
Attendance: 13,601
