= Drew McAthy =

American soccer player

Personal information
- Full name: Drew Alan McAthy
- Date of birth: September 10, 1982 (age 44)
- Place of birth: Huntington Beach, California, U.S.
- Height: 6 ft 2 in (1.88 m)
- Position: Forward

Youth career
- Huntington Beach High School
- 2001–2004: UC Santa Barbara Gauchos

Senior career*
Years	Team	Apps	(Gls)
2003	Orange County Blue Star	12	(3)
2004	Cape Cod Crusaders	9	(5)
2005	Puerto Rico Islanders	23	(1)
2006	Portland Timbers	14	(0)
Total		58	(9)
- * Club domestic league appearances and goals

Drew Alan McAthy (born September 10, 1982) is an American retired soccer player.

== Playing career ==
=== Youth and college ===
McAthy played high school soccer for Huntington Beach High School in Southern California. He set school records for career goals at 41, career assists at 28, and assists in one season. He was also recognized as a "Scholar with Distinction" upon graduation from HBHS. His prowess on the field and in the classroom led to being recruited to the University of California, Santa Barbara to play college soccer on scholarship by coach Tim Vom Steeg.

With the UCSB Gauchos, he played for 4 years, eventually leading the team to the 2004 Division I Men's College Cup where the Gauchos fell in penalties in the championship game to Indiana University. He was named the 2004 College Cup's Most Outstanding Offensive Player for the tournament.

While at university, McAthy played for two different PDL teams to gain experience and keep fitness throughout the summer. In 2003, he appeared in 9 games and scored 2 goals for Orange County Blue Star alongside UCSB teammate Dan Kennedy. The next season, he played for Cape Cod Crusaders and scored 5 goals with 2 assists in 9 games.

=== Professional ===
Upon graduating from UCSB, McAthy was drafted by the Los Angeles Galaxy in the 2nd Round, 19th Overall, of the 2005 MLS Supplemental Draft. McAthy elected not to join up with the Galaxy and was drafted by the Puerto Rico Islanders in the 1st Round, 1st Overall, of the 2005 USL First Division College Draft.

McAthy joined the Puerto Rico Islanders and played the 2005 season with them, scoring once in 23 games. He then signed with Portland Timbers the next season. McAthy appeared in 14 games without scoring a goal and was released at the end of the season.
