= Tony Lochhead =

New Zealand footballer (born 1982)

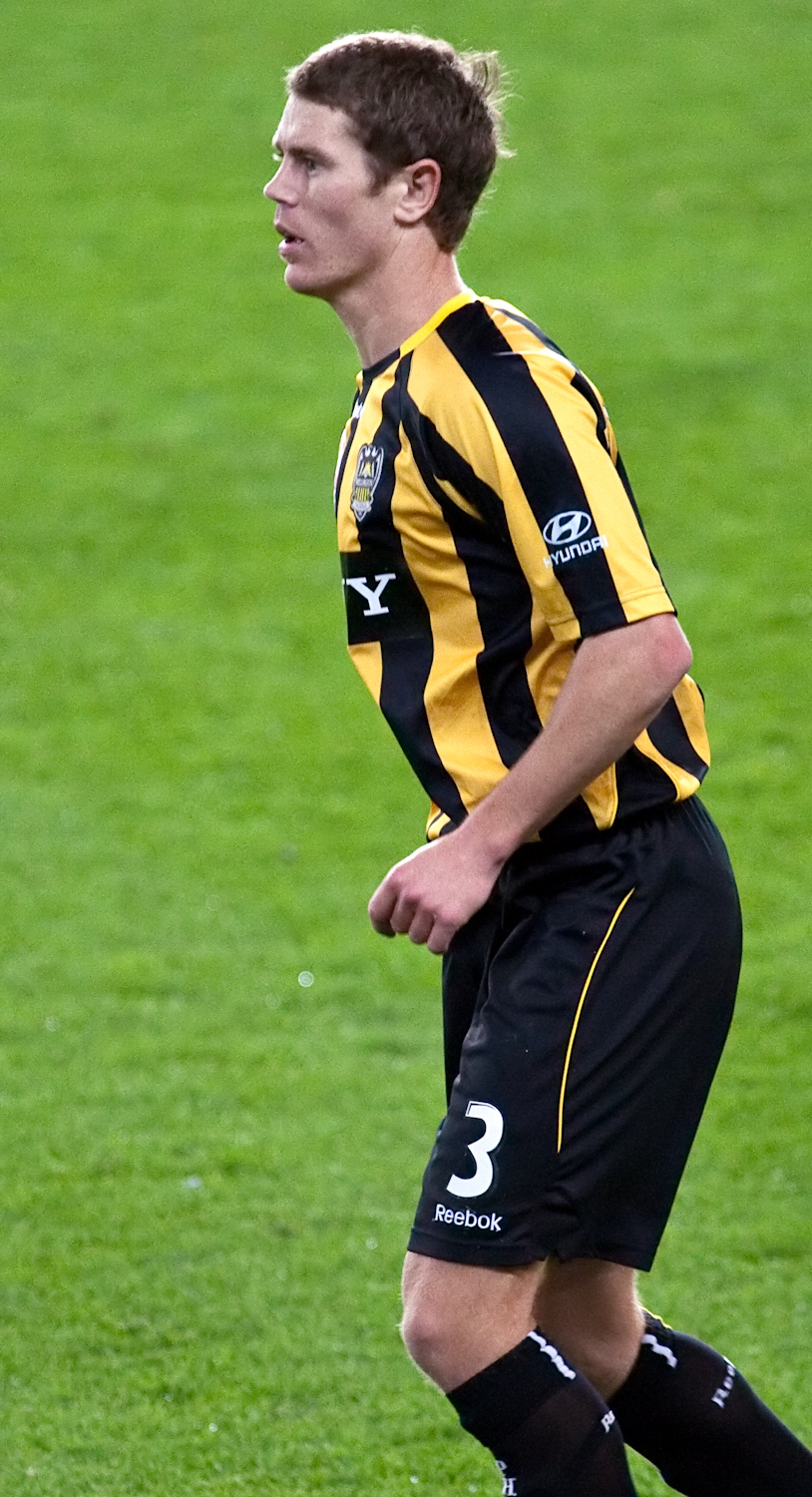
- Lochhead for Wellington Phoenix in the 2009-10 A-League

Personal information
- Full name: Tony James Lochhead
- Date of birth: 12 January 1982 (age 44)
- Place of birth: Tauranga, New Zealand
- Height: 6 ft 0 in (1.83 m)
- Position: Defender

Youth career
- Tauranga Boys' College
- Otumoetai College

College career
Years	Team	Apps	(Gls)
2001–2004	UC Santa Barbara Gauchos	83	(4)

Senior career*
Years	Team	Apps	(Gls)
- Tauranga City United AFC
2004	Orange County Blue Star	10	(1)
2005–2007	New England Revolution	16	(0)
2007–2013	Wellington Phoenix FC	131	(1)
2014	Chivas USA	20	(0)
Total		177	(2)

International career
1999	New Zealand U17	3	(0)
2003–2004	New Zealand U23	6	(1)
2003–2013	New Zealand	47	(1)
- * Club domestic league appearances and goals

Tony James Lochhead (born 12 January 1982) is a New Zealand former professional footballer who played as a defender. He made 47 appearances for the New Zealand national team.

== Early life and education ==
Lochhead was born on 12 January 1982 in Tauranga, New Zealand. He was a student at Otumoetai College in Tauranga, where he played football and volleyball.

Lochhead went to the United States in 2001 to study at the University of California, Santa Barbara. He was a student-athlete and played college soccer for the UC Santa Barbara Gauchos men's soccer team. He was a team member from 2001 to 2004, starting all 83 games he played, and set a school record for total minutes. Lochhead was named first-team All-Big West Conference in 2003, and was a second-team All-American and the Big West Defensive Player of the Year in 2004. As a senior, Lochhead led UCSB to the finals of the 2004 NCAA Division I Men's Soccer Championship where the team fell in penalty kicks.

== Playing career ==
Before attending UC Santa Barbara, Lochhead played with Tauranga City United AFC of the New Zealand National Soccer League. While enrolled in college, he appeared in 10 games for USL Premier Development League team Orange County Blue Star and scored one goal.

Following his career at Santa Barbara, Lochhead was drafted 33rd overall in the 2005 MLS SuperDraft by the New England Revolution. However, at that time he elected not to sign with MLS to trial with European clubs. While with R.S.C. Anderlecht, Lochhead injured his ankle and returned to Santa Barbara for rehab. A glandular fever slowed the recovery process, but Lochhead returned to Europe for trials in Sweden and Norway which also proved unsuccessful. He signed with New England on 15 September 2005, some months into the 2005 New England Revolution season.

Lochhead made his Revolution debut on 30 April 2006 in a 2-1 home loss to the Chicago Fire. On 11 June, he recorded the first (and second) assists of his Revolution career, setting up goals by Taylor Twellman and Steve Ralston in a 3-3 draw with the Chicago Fire. In total, during the 2006 New England Revolution season, Lochhead made a total of 16 league appearances, starting 9 matches.

On 13 April 2007, the Revolution waived Lochhead to free up a senior roster spot for former UC Santa Barbara teammate Bryan Byrne who was signed the same day.

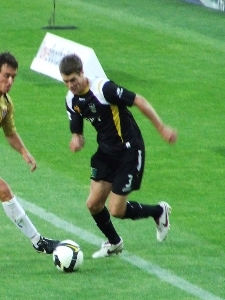
Lochhead in action with Wellington Phoenix FC

On 11 May 2007, Wellington Phoenix FC of Australia's A-League announced the signing of Lochhead on a two-year contract. In July 2008, news surfaced that Lochhead was on trial with English Premier League side Middlesbrough F.C. The next month, the Teesside Gazette reported that Lochhead had returned to Wellington Phoenix. On 25 November 2009 Lochhead made his 50th appearance for Wellington Phoenix in their 6–0 win over Gold Coast United FC and was the first Phoenix player to do so. On 9 June 2013, Lochhead was released after not being offered a new contract.

In January 2014 it was announced that newly appointed head coach, Wilmer Cabrera, had signed Lochhead to Major League Soccer side Chivas USA. The Chivas USA franchise folded at the conclusion of the 2014 season.

=== International career ===
Lochhead represented New Zealand at Under 17 and under 23 level before making his full All Whites debut in a 0–3 loss Iran on 12 October 2003. He started every match for the team during 2006 FIFA World Cup Qualifying, and was included in the 2009 FIFA Confederations Cup squad. Lochhead continues to play for the New Zealand national team and helped the Kiwis qualify for the 2010 World Cup Finals in South Africa.

On 10 May 2010, Lochhead was named in New Zealand's final 23-man squad to compete at the 2010 FIFA World Cup.

== Personal life ==
Lochhead married 2008 Miss Universe New Zealand contestant, Samantha Powell, in August 2012. Following his footballing career, Lochhead became involved with commercial real estate with Colliers International in Southern California.

== Career statistics ==
=== Club ===
As of 19 June 2016

Appearances and goals by club, season and competition
Club	Season	League			National cup (Note: Includes Australia Cup, U.S. Open Cup)		Continental		Total	
Club	Season	Division	Apps	Goals	Apps	Goals	Apps	Goals	Apps	Goals
Orange County Blue Star	2004	Premier Development League	10	1	0	0	0	0	10	1
New England Revolution	2005	Major League Soccer	0	0	0	0	0	0	0	0
New England Revolution	2006	Major League Soccer	16	0	0	0	2 (Note: Appearances in CONCACAF Champions Cup)	0	18	0
New England Revolution	2007	Major League Soccer	0	0	0	0	0	0	0	0
New England Revolution	Total		16	0	0	0	2	0	18	0
Wellington Phoenix	2007–08	A-League	18	1	5	0	0	0	23	1
Wellington Phoenix	2008–09	A-League	21	0	2	0	0	0	23	0
Wellington Phoenix	2009–10	A-League	28	0	0	0	0	0	28	0
Wellington Phoenix	2010–11	A-League	16	0	0	0	0	0	16	0
Wellington Phoenix	2011–12	A-League	25	0	0	0	0	0	25	0
Wellington Phoenix	2012–13	A-League	23	0	0	0	0	0	23	0
Wellington Phoenix	Total		131	1	7	0	0	0	138	1
Chivas USA	2014	Major League Soccer	20	0	1	0	0	0	21	0
Career total			177	2	8	0	2	0	187	2

=== International ===
Scores and results list New Zealand's goal tally first, score column indicates score after each Lochhead goal.

List of international goals scored by Tony Lochhead
No.	Date	Venue	Opponent	Score	Result	Competition
1	11 September 2012	North Harbour Stadium, Auckland, New Zealand	Solomon Islands	4–1	6–1	2014 FIFA World Cup qualification

== Honours ==
Wellington Phoenix

- NE Super Series Championship runner-up: 2012

== See also ==
- List of foreign MLS players
- List of New Zealand international footballers
- List of University of California, Santa Barbara alumni
- List of Wellington Phoenix FC players
