= List of soccer stadiums in the United States =

The following is a partial list of soccer stadiums in the United States. It includes all stadiums in the top three levels of American soccer and some lower league and collegiate stadiums in the United States. The minimum capacity is 1,000.

Some of these venues are soccer-specific stadiums. Other venues are multipurpose stadiums, American football stadiums, or baseball stadiums that also host soccer games.

== Current stadiums ==
Stadium	Capacity	City	State	Teams/Major Events	Surface	Year opened	Notes	Ref.	Image
Admiral Fetterman Field	5,038	Pensacola	Florida	Pensacola Blue Wahoos West Florida Argonauts football	Artificial Turf	2012			
Al Lang Stadium	7,227	St. Petersburg	Florida	Tampa Bay Rowdies	Grass	1947	Former baseball park		
Allianz Field	19,400	Saint Paul	Minnesota	Minnesota United FC Minnesota United FC 2 2019 CONCACAF Gold Cup venue Various USA and USA women's matches	Grass	2019	Hosted the 2022 MLS All-Star Game		
Albert-Daly Field	2,271	Williamsburg	Virginia	Virginia Legacy William & Mary Tribe	Grass	2004			
Alex G. Spanos Stadium	11,075	San Luis Obispo	California	Cal Poly Mustangs	FieldTurf	1935	Third-largest stadium in college soccer		
Allegiant Stadium	61,000	Paradise	Nevada	2024 Copa América venue Multiple CONCACAF Gold Cups Various international club friendlies	Grass	2020	Also used for football		
All-High Stadium	4,000	Buffalo	New York	FC Buffalo Medaille Mavericks Formerly Queen City FC	Artificial turf	1926	Renovated in 2007		
Aloha Stadium	50,000	Halawa	Hawaii	Pan-Pacific Championship	Act Global turf	1975	Was scheduled to host a USWNT match in 2008 that was cancelled due to concerns over the turf being unsafe to play on		
Alumni Stadium	3,007	Notre Dame	Indiana	Notre Dame Fighting Irish	Grass	2009			
America First Field	20,008	Sandy	Utah	Real Salt Lake Formerly Utah Royals Various international matches	Grass	2008	Hosted the 2009 MLS All-Star Game		
American Legion Memorial Stadium	10,500	Charlotte	North Carolina	Charlotte Independence	Grass	1936	Renovated in 2010, 2015, and 2019		
Anchorage Football Stadium	4,500	Anchorage	Alaska	Local teams	FieldTurf				
Anteater Stadium	2,500	Irvine	California	UC Irvine Anteaters	Grass	2000			
Arrowhead Stadium	79,451	Kansas City	Missouri	Formerly Kansas City Wizards 2026 FIFA World Cup venue 2024 Copa América venue Various international matches	Grass	1972	Primarily used for football		
AT&T Field	6,382	Chattanooga	Tennessee	Chattanooga Lookouts	Grass	2000	Primarily used for baseball		
AT&T Stadium	80,000	Arlington	Texas	2026 FIFA World Cup venue 2024 Copa América venue Multiple CONCACAF Gold Cups Various international matches	Matrix Turf	2009	Also used for football; retractable roof stadium, formerly called Cowboys Stadium		
Atlanta Silverbacks Park	5,000	Chamblee	Georgia	Formerly Atlanta Silverbacks Local teams	FieldTurf	2006			
Atwood Stadium	11,000	Flint	Michigan	Flint City Bucks Powers Catholic High School	FieldTurf	1929			
Audi Field	20,000	Washington	District of Columbia	D.C. United Washington Spirit	Grass	2018	Hosted the 2023 MLS All-Star Game		
Audrey J. Walton Stadium	2,500	Columbia	Missouri	Missouri Tigers	Grass	1996			
AutoZone Park	10,000	Memphis	Tennessee	Memphis 901 FC	Grass	2000	Primarily used for baseball		
Baker Stadium	3,500	Tacoma	Washington	Puget Sound Loggers	Grass	1964			
Balboa Stadium	3,000	San Diego	California	Formerly San Diego Toros	Grass	1914			
Bank of America Stadium	75,525	Charlotte	North Carolina	Charlotte FC 2024 Copa América venue Multiple CONCACAF Gold Cups Various international matches	FieldTurf	1996	Also used for football; hosted the 2026 MLS All-Star Game		
Baseball Grounds of Jacksonville	11,000	Jacksonville	Florida	Jacksonville Armada FC	Grass	2003			
BBVA Field	5,000	Birmingham	Alabama	UAB Blazers Birmingham Legion	Grass	2015			
Beaver Stadium	106,572	State College	Pennsylvania	Pennsylvania State University	Grass	1960	Primarily used for football		
Belson Stadium	2,600	New York	New York	New York Pancyprian-Freedoms St. John's Red Storm	FieldTurf	2001			
Bill Armstrong Stadium	6,500	Bloomington	Indiana	Indiana University Hoosiers	Grass	1981	Also contains a velodrome, home to the Little 500		
BMO Stadium	22,000	Los Angeles	California	Los Angeles FC Angel City FC 2019 CONCACAF Gold Cup venue Various international matches	Grass	2018	Hosted the 2021 MLS All-Star Game		
Bold Stadium	5,036	Austin	Texas		Grass	2019			
Boxer Stadium	3,500	San Francisco	California	San Francisco Glens El Farolito SC Local teams	Grass	1953	Stadium is within Balboa Park		
Breese Stevens Field	7,000	Madison	Wisconsin	Forward Madison FC Madison 56ers Local teams	Grass	1926			
Busch Stadium	46,861	St. Louis	Missouri	Various international matches	Grass	2006	Primarily used for baseball		
Cadet Soccer Stadium	1,000	Colorado Springs	Colorado	Air Force Falcons	Grass	1995			
Caesars Superdome	73,208	New Orleans	Louisiana	Various international matches	Act Global synthetic turf	1975	Also used for football and basketball; formerly known as the Louisiana Superdome		
Camping World Stadium	65,000	Orlando	Florida	1994 FIFA World Cup venue Copa América Centenario venue Formerly Orlando City (MLS) (2015–2017) 1996 Summer Olympics venue Various international matches and club friendlies	AstroTurf	1936; 2014	Also used for football; hosted the 1998 MLS All-Star Game		
Carey Stadium	4,000	Ocean City	New Jersey	Ocean City Nor'easters Ocean City High School	FieldTurf		Also used for football and lacrosse		
Carroll Stadium	12,100	Indianapolis	Indiana	Indy Eleven	FieldTurf	1982	Renovated in 2013-2014		
Bob Ford Field at Tom & Mary Casey Stadium	8,500	Albany	New York	Albany Great Danes	Grass	2013	Also used for football and lacrosse		
Cashman Field	9,334	Las Vegas	Nevada	Las Vegas Lights FC	Grass	1983	Former baseball park, converted for soccer in 2018		
Casino Arizona Field	6,200	Tempe	Arizona	Formerly Phoenix Rising FC	Grass	2017			
CEFCU Stadium	18,203	San Jose	California	Various international matches Formerly San Jose Earthquakes (NASL) Formerly San Jose Clash/Earthquakes Formerly San Jose CyberRays	FieldTurf	1933			
Centennial Field	5,000	Burlington	Vermont	Vermont Catamounts	Grass				
Championship Soccer Stadium	5,000	Irvine	California	Orange County SC California United Strikers FC	Grass	2018			
Chaparral Stadium	10,361	Austin	Texas	Westlake Chaparrals	FieldTurf	2002	Hosted the 2011 "Team USA vs World" football game; stadium used primarily for football, but also hosts men's and women's Chaparral soccer teams		
Charlie W. Johnson Stadium	10,000	Columbia	South Carolina	Benedict Tigers	Grass				
Chase Field	49,033	Phoenix	Arizona	Various international matches	Grass	1998	Retractable roof stadium		
Cheney Stadium	6,500	Tacoma	Washington	OL Reign Tacoma Defiance	Grass	1960	Primarily used for baseball		
CHI Memorial Stadium	5,500	East Ridge	Tennessee	Chattanooga Red Wolves Dalton Red Wolves	Grass	2020			
Choctaw Stadium	48,114	Arlington	Texas	North Texas SC	Grass	1994	Converted from a baseball diamond to a rectangular pitch after the 2019 MLB season		
Citi Field	41,800	New York	New York	New York City FC (rarely) Various international matches	Grass	2009			
Citrus Stadium	10,000	Glendora	California	Los Angeles Storm	Grass				
City Park Stadium	1,845	New Rochelle	New York	Westchester Flames	Grass				
City Stadium	22,000	Richmond	Virginia	Richmond Kickers	Grass	1929			
Cocoa Expo Sports Center	3,500	Cocoa	Florida	Cocoa Expos	Grass				
Columbia Soccer Stadium	3,500	New York City	New York	Columbia Lions	FieldTurf	1985			
Corbett Stadium	3,000	Tampa	Florida	South Florida Bulls	Grass	2011			
Cotton Bowl	92,200	Dallas	Texas	Atlético Dallas Dallas Trinity FC 1994 FIFA World Cup venue Multiple CONCACAF Gold Cups Formerly Dallas Burn	Grass	1930	Also used for football; located on the Fair Park area of Dallas, originally named Fair Park Stadium		
County University Soccer Stadium	3,000	Spartanburg	South Carolina	USC Upstate Spartans	Grass	2001			
Dail Soccer Field	3,000	Raleigh	North Carolina	NC State Wolfpack	Artificial turf	2008	Training field during the 1996 Summer Olympics in Atlanta		
Daikin Park	40,950	Houston	Texas	Various international matches	Grass	2000	Retractable roof stadium		
Dawson Stadium	22,000	Orangeburg	South Carolina	South Carolina State	FieldTurf	1955; 1994			
Dick Bivins Stadium	15,000	Amarillo	Texas	Amarillo Independent School District	FieldTurf		Also used for football and track		
Dick Dlesk Soccer Stadium	1,100	Morgantown	West Virginia	West Virginia Mountaineers	Grass				
Dick's Sporting Goods Park	19,680	Commerce City	Colorado	Colorado Rapids Various international matches	Grass	2007	Hosted the 2015 MLS All-Star Game		
Dignity Health Sports Park	27,000	Carson	California	LA Galaxy LA Galaxy II Formerly Chivas USA 2003 FIFA Women's World Cup venue Multiple CONCACAF Gold Cups Various international matches	Grass	2003	Formerly known as the Home Depot Center (2003–2013), and the StubHub Center (2013–2018)		
DOC Stadium	3,500	West Carrollton	Ohio	Dayton Dutch Lions Carrollton High School	Artificial turf				Dayton_Outpatient_Center_Stadium
Dr. Mark & Cindy Lynn Stadium	5,300	Louisville	Kentucky	Louisville Cardinals	Grass	2014			
Drake Stadium	14,557	Des Moines	Iowa	Des Moines Menace	FieldTurf	1925	Primarily used for football and athletics		2014_Relays_Panorama
Ellis Field	3,500	College Station	Texas	Texas A&M Aggies	Grass				
Edwards Stadium	22,000	Berkeley	California	California Golden Bears	Grass	1932	Track and field stadium reconfigured in 1999 to accommodate the California soccer teams; largest stadium in college soccer		
Elizabeth Lyle Robbie Stadium	1,000	Falcon Heights, Minnesota	Minnesota	Minnesota Golden Gophers women's soccer	Grass	1999			
Empower Field at Mile High	76,125	Denver	Colorado	Various international matches Formerly Colorado Rapids	Grass	2001	Primarily used for football		
Energizer Park	22,500	St. Louis	Missouri	St Louis City SC St. Louis City 2 Multiple CONCACAF Gold Cups	Grass	2022			
ESPN Wide World of Sports Complex	6,000	Orlando	Florida	Walt Disney World Pro Soccer Classic MLS is Back Tournament Formerly Orlando City (USL) (2014 only)	Grass	1997			
Eugene Stone III Soccer Stadium	3,000	Greenville	South Carolina	Furman Paladins	Grass				
EverBank Stadium	67,814	Jacksonville	Florida	Various USA matches	Grass	1995	Primarily used for football		
Fetzer Field	5,025	Chapel Hill	North Carolina	North Carolina Tar Heels	Grass				
Field of Dreams	12,000	Las Cruces	New Mexico	Las Cruces High School, Mayfield High School, and Oñate High School football	Grass				
Fifth Third Bank Stadium	8,300	Kennesaw	Georgia	Kennesaw State Owls Atlanta United FC (rarely) Atlanta United 2	Grass	2010	Also used for football and lacrosse		
Finley Stadium Davenport Field	20,668	Chattanooga	Tennessee	Chattanooga FC	AstroTurf Gameday	1997			
Gaelic Park	2,000	New York City	New York	Manhattan SC Manhattan Jaspers	FieldTurf	1926			
Gayle and Tom Benson Stadium	6,000	San Antonio	Texas			2008			
Geodis Park	30,000	Nashville	Tennessee	Nashville SC	Grass	2022			
Gillette Stadium	68,756	Foxborough	Massachusetts	New England Revolution New England Revolution II 2026 FIFA World Cup venue 2003 FIFA Women's World Cup venue Copa América Centenario venue Multiple CONCACAF Gold Cups Various international matches	FieldTurf	2002	Also used for football; formerly named CMGI Field, seating capacity artificially reduced for regular season matches		
Grande Communications Stadium	18,000	Midland	Texas	West Texas United Midland Bulldogs Legacy Rebels	FieldTurf	2002			
Greater Nevada Field	9,013	Reno	Nevada	Reno 1868 FC		2009			
Hard Rock Stadium	75,540	Miami Gardens	Florida	2026 FIFA World Cup venue 2024 Copa América venue Various international matches	Grass	1987	Also used for football; formerly called Joe Robbie Stadium		
Harder Stadium	17,000	Santa Barbara	California	Santa Barbara Sky FC UCSB Gauchos	Grass		Second-largest stadium in college soccer		
Harvard Stadium	30,323	Boston	Massachusetts	Boston Breakers 1984 Summer Olympics venue	FieldTurf	1903			
Heart Health Park	11,569	Sacramento	California	Sacramento Republic FC	Grass	2014	Formerly called Bonney Field and Papa John's Park		
H-E-B Park	9,735	Edinburgh	Texas		Grass	2017			
Hefner Stadium	6,500	Fort Wayne	Indiana	Fort Wayne Fever Purdue Fort Wayne Mastodons	Grass				
Herb Parker Stadium	4,500	Minot	North Dakota	Minot State Beavers	FieldTurf	2015	Primarily used for football		
Hermann Stadium	6,050	St. Louis	Missouri	Saint Louis Billikens	Grass				
Hersheypark Stadium	15,641	Hershey	Pennsylvania	Hershey FC Hershey High School	FieldTurf	1939			
Highmark Stadium	5,000	Pittsburgh	Pennsylvania	Pittsburgh Riverhounds SC	Grass	2013			
Hillsboro Stadium	7,600	Hillsboro	Oregon	Local teams	AstroTurf	1999			
Historic Crew Stadium	20,455	Columbus	Ohio	Formerly Columbus Crew 2003 FIFA Women's World Cup venue Various international matches	Grass	1999	The first MLS Soccer-specific stadium		
Hofstra University Soccer Stadium	1,600	Hempstead	New York	Hofstra Pride Long Island Rough Riders	FieldTurf	2003			
House Park	6,500	Austin	Texas		Artificial turf	1939			
Houseman Field	8,000	Grand Rapids	Michigan	Local teams	Artificial turf	1923	Renovated in 2009		
Huntington Bank Field	67,431	Cleveland	Ohio	Various USA matches Multiple CONCACAF Gold Cups	Grass	1999	Also used for football and ice hockey		
Hurricane Soccer and Track Stadium	2,000	Tulsa	Oklahoma	Tulsa Golden Hurricane	Grass	2003			
Husky Stadium	4,400	St. Cloud	Minnesota	St. Cloud State Huskies	Omni Turf	2004	Primarily used for football		
Icahn Stadium	5,000	New York	New York	Local teams	Grass	2005			
Illinois Soccer Stadium	6,000	Champaign	Illinois	Illinois Fighting Illini	Grass	1997			
Independence Stadium	50,832	Shreveport	Louisiana	Occasional exhibition matches	FieldTurf	1925	Formerly known as State Fair Stadium		
Inter&Co Stadium	25,500	Orlando	Florida	Orlando City SC Orlando Pride 2024 Copa América venue 2021 CONCACAF Gold Cup venue	Grass	2017	Hosted the 2019 MLS All-Star Game		
Inter Miami CF Stadium	21,000	Ft. Lauderdale	Florida	Inter Miami CF II Formerly Inter Miami CF (2020 to 2025) 2023 CONCACAF Gold Cup venue Various international matches	Grass	2020			
Invaders Soccer Complex	4,985	South Bend	Indiana	Indiana Invaders	Grass				
Irwin Belk Track/Transamerica Field	4,000	Charlotte	North Carolina	Charlotte 49ers	Grass				
Isotopes Park	13,500	Albuquerque	New Mexico	New Mexico United	Grass	2003			
IU Michael A. Carroll Track & Soccer Stadium	12,100	Indianapolis	Indiana	Indiana University-Purdue University Indianapolis Jaguars	Grass	1982	Renovated in 2013-2014		
J. Birney Crum Stadium	15,000	Allentown	Pennsylvania	Lehigh Valley Jazz	Grass	1948	Renovated in 2002		
Jack Coffey Field	7,000	New York	New York	Fordham Rams	FieldTurf	1930	Renovated in 1990, 2004 and 2014		
James G. Pressly Stadium	4,500	Gainesville	Florida	Florida Gators	Grass				
James M. Shuart Stadium	11,929	Hempstead	New York	New York Cosmos Hofstra Pride	FieldTurf	1962			
Jeffrey Field	5,000	University Park	Pennsylvania	Penn State Nittany Lions	Grass	1972	2006 Collegiate Soccer Field of the Year by the SportsTurf Managers Association		
John Crain Field at the OU Soccer Complex	3,500	Norman	Oklahoma	Oklahoma Sooners	Grass	2000			
John Elway Stadium	3,000	Granada Hills	California	San Fernando Valley Quakes	FieldTurf				
Juan Ramón Loubriel Stadium	22,000	Bayamón	Puerto Rico	Puerto Rico FC	Grass	1973			
Kermit Tipton Stadium	6,600	Johnson City	Tennessee	Tri-Cities Otters	Artificial turf	2010			
Keyworth Stadium	7,500	Hamtramck	Michigan	Detroit City FC	FieldTurf	1936			
Kezar Stadium	9,044	San Francisco	California	San Francisco City FC Local teams	Grass	1925; 1990	Rebuilt in 1990 on the site of the former stadium		
Kingston Stadium	15,000	Cedar Rapids	Iowa	Local high school teams	Grass	1952	Renovated in 2019		
Kino North Stadium	3,200	Tucson	Arizona	FC Tucson	Grass	1998	Part of the Kino Sports Complex		
Kino Veterans Memorial Stadium	11,000	Tucson	Arizona	New York Red Bulls preseason Desert Diamond Cup	Grass	1998	Part of the Kino Sports Complex; used for baseball during summer months		
Klöckner Stadium	7,906	Charlottesville	Virginia	Virginia Cavaliers	Grass	1992			
Koskinen Stadium	7,000	Durham	North Carolina	Duke Blue Devils	Grass				
Krenzler Field	2,000	Cleveland	Ohio	Cleveland City Stars Cleveland State Vikings	FieldTurf	1985			
Kuntz Memorial Soccer Stadium	6,800	Indianapolis	Indiana	F.C. Indiana (WPSL) F.C. Indiana (NPSL)	Grass	1987			
L&N Federal Credit Union Stadium	56,000	Louisville	Kentucky	Various USA women's matches	FieldTurf	1998	Primarily used for football		
Lady Demon Soccer Complex	1,000	Natchitoches	Louisiana	Northwestern State Lady Demons	Grass	2010			
La Playa Stadium	10,000	Santa Barbara	California	Santa Barbara Sky FC	Grass				
Legends Stadium	2,000	Quincy	Illinois	Quincy Hawks and Lady Hawks	FieldTurf	1978			
Laney Eagle Stadium	5,500	Oakland	California	Oakland Roots SC Oakland Soul SC Laney College Eagles	FieldTurf				
Legacy Early College Field	4,000	Greenville	South Carolina	Greenville Triumph	Artificial turf				
Legion Field	71,594	Birmingham	Alabama	1996 Summer Olympics venue	FieldTurf	1926	Primarily used for football; former match site of USSF men's national team		
Legion Stadium	5,300	Wilmington	North Carolina		Grass				
Levi's Stadium	68,500	Santa Clara	California	San Jose Earthquakes (rarely) 2026 FIFA World Cup venue 2016 and 2024 Copa América venue Multiple CONCACAF Gold Cups Various Mexico matches	Grass	2014	Also used for football		
Lexington SC Stadium	7,500	Lexington	Kentucky	Lexington SC	Grass	2024			
Lincoln Financial Field	68,532	Philadelphia	Pennsylvania	2026 FIFA World Cup venue 2003 FIFA Women's World Cup venue Copa América Centenario venue Multiple CONCACAF Gold Cups Various international club friendlies	Grass	2003	Also used for football; Philadelphia Union 2010 debut home opener		
Los Angeles Memorial Coliseum	77,500	Los Angeles	California	1932 and 1984 Summer Olympics venue Various international matches	Grass	1923	Also used for football; U.S. National Register of Historic Places site, a U.S. National Historic Landmark		
Louisville Slugger Field	13,131	Louisville	Kentucky		Grass	2000			
LSU Soccer Stadium	2,197	Baton Rouge	Louisiana	LSU Tigers	Grass	1996			
Lucas Oil Stadium	67,000	Indianapolis	Indiana	Indy Eleven	Shaw Sports Momentum Pro	2008	Also used for football, retractable roof stadium		
Ludwig Field	7,000	College Park	Maryland	Maryland Terrapins	Grass				
Lumen Field	67,000	Seattle	Washington	Seattle Sounders FC Seattle Reign FC 2026 FIFA World Cup venue Copa América Centenario venue Multiple CONCACAF Gold Cups Various international matches	FieldTurf	2002	Also used for football; Sounders FC regular season match seating capacity is 38,500		
Lusitano Stadium	3,000	Ludlow	Massachusetts	Western Mass Pioneers Gremio Lusitano	Grass	1918			
Lynn Family Stadium	11,700	Louisville	Kentucky	Louisville City FC Racing Louisville	Grass	2020			
M&T Bank Stadium	71,008	Baltimore	Maryland	Various international matches and club friendlies	Grass	1998	Primarily used for football		
Mackay Stadium	29,993	Reno	Nevada	Nevada Wolf Pack	FieldTurf	1966	The playing field is 4,610 feet above sea level		
MacKenzie Alumni Field	1,000	Macomb	Illinois	Western Illinois Leathernecks	Grass				
Macpherson Stadium	3,000	Browns Summit	North Carolina	North Carolina Fusion U23	Grass	2002			
Madison City Stadium	7,000	Madison	Alabama	High school teams	Grass				
Mansion Park	10,400	Altoona	Pennsylvania	Altoona Area High School			Also used for football and track		
Mazzella Field	2,440	New Rochelle	New York	Iona Gaels	FieldTurf	1989			
McAlister Field	1,000	Los Angeles	California	USC Trojans	Grass	1998			
McCulloch Stadium	2,500	Salem	Oregon	Cascade Surge	FieldTurf				
McEneaney Field	3,000	Sioux Falls	South Dakota	Sioux Falls Spitfire					
Meares Stadium	5,000	Mars Hill	North Carolina	Mars Hill Lions	FieldTurf				
Memorial Stadium	20,000	Manhattan	Kansas	K-State club soccer Local teams	FieldTurf				
Memorial Stadium	17,000	Seattle	Washington	Formerly Seattle Sounders (NASL) Formerly Seattle Sounders (A-League) Local teams	AstroTurf	1948			
Memorial Stadium	5,200	Portland	Maine	GPS Portland Phoenix Deering High School	FieldTurf		Also used for football		
Memorial Stadium	5,000	Asheville	North Carolina	Asheville City SC	Artificial turf	1925			
Mercedes-Benz Stadium	42,500 (expandable to 71,000)	Atlanta	Georgia	Atlanta United FC 2026 FIFA World Cup venue 2024 Copa América venue	Field Turf	2017	Also used for football; hosted the 2018 MLS All-Star Game		
Merlo Field	4,892	Portland	Oregon	Portland Timbers 2 Portland Pilots	Grass	1992			
Method Road	3,000	Raleigh	North Carolina	North Carolina State Wolfpack	Grass				
MetLife Stadium	82,566	East Rutherford	New Jersey	2026 FIFA World Cup venue 2016 and 2024 Copa América venue Multiple CONCACAF Gold Cups Various international matches	FieldTurf	2010	Also used for football; formerly called New Meadowlands Stadium		
Metropolitan Oval	1,500	New York City	New York	Local teams	FieldTurf	1925			
Michigan Stadium	107,601	Ann Arbor	Michigan	Michigan Wolverines	FieldTurf	1927	Primarily used for football; highest attendance for a soccer match in the USA (109,318), in a 2014 friendly between Real Madrid and Manchester United		
Midlothian Stadium	8,176	Midlothian	Texas	High school and local teams	FieldTurf				
Mike A. Myers Stadium	20,000	Austin	Texas	Texas Longhorns	Grass				
Mike Rose Stadium	2,500	Memphis	Tennessee	Memphis Tigers	Grass				
Miller Stadium	11,000	Oklahoma City	Oklahoma	Rayo OKC	Grass				
Mitchel Athletic Complex Stadium	10,102	Uniondale	New York	New York Cosmos	FieldTurf	1984			
Moretz Stadium	8,500	Hickory	North Carolina	Lenoir-Rhyne Bears	GrassV				
Morrison Stadium	6,000	Omaha	Nebraska	Creighton Bluejays	Grass				
Morrone Stadium	4,500	Storrs	Connecticut	Connecticut Huskies	Grass				
MSU Soccer Park	5,000	Montclair	New Jersey	Montclair State Red Hawks New York Red Bulls II New York Red Bulls U23	Grass	1998			
National Sports Center	8,500	Blaine	Minnesota	Minnesota United FC Formerly Minnesota Thunder	Grass				
Navy-USMC Memorial Stadium	34,000	Annapolis	Maryland	Annapolis Blues FC	FieldTurf	1959			
Neal Patterson Stadium	2,500	Stillwater	Oklahoma	Oklahoma State Cowgirls	Grass	1996			
Negoesco Stadium	3,000	San Francisco	California	USF Dons	FieldTurf	1982			
Newton Campus Soccer Field	2,000	Newton	Massachusetts	Boston College Eagles	AstroTurf	1999			
Nicholls Soccer Complex	1,000	Thibodaux	Louisiana	Nicholls Colonels	Grass				
Nickerson Field	9,871	Boston	Massachusetts	Boston University Terriers Formerly Boston Breakers	FieldTurf	1915; 1955	Opened as Braves Field only the right-field pavilion and entry gate are part of the current stadium		
Nippert Stadium	32,250	Cincinnati	Ohio	Formerly FC Cincinnati	Act Global turf	1915			
Nissan Stadium	68,798	Nashville	Tennessee	Various international matches	Grass	1999	Also used for football; formerly named Adelphia Coliseum and The Coliseum		
Northwest Stadium	58,000	Landover	Maryland	1999 FIFA Women's World Cup venue	Grass	1997	Also used for football; formerly named Jack Kent Cooke Stadium		
Nu Stadium	26,700	Miami	Florida	Inter Miami CF	Grass	2026			
NRG Stadium	71,500	Houston	Texas	2026 FIFA World Cup venue 2016 and 2024 Copa América venue Multiple CONCACAF Gold Cups Various USA and Mexico matches	Grass	2002	Also used for football, retractable roof stadium; hosted the 2010 MLS All-Star Game		
Oakland Coliseum	47,416	Oakland	California	Oakland Roots SC Various international matches	Grass	1966	Former home for premier matches of the San Jose Earthquakes		
Ohio Stadium	102,329	Columbus	Ohio	Ohio State Buckeyes	FieldTurf	1921	Primarily used for football; former home of the Columbus Crew with seating capacity artificially reduced		
ONEOK Field	7,833	Tulsa	Oklahoma	FC Tulsa	Grass	2010	Primarily used for baseball		
One Spokane Stadium	5,000	Spokane	Washington	Spokane Velocity FC	Artificial turf	2023			
Oracle Park	41,265	San Francisco	California	Various international matches	Grass	2000	Primarily used for baseball		
PAL Stadium	5,000	San Jose	California	San Jose Frogs	Grass				
Pan American Stadium	5,000	New Orleans	Louisiana	New Orleans Jesters	FieldTurf	1973	Former home for USISL matches of the New Orleans Riverboat Gamblers		
Paradise Coast Sports Complex	5,000	Naples	Florida		Grass	2017	Also used for football		
Patriots Point Soccer Complex	2,000	Mount Pleasant	South Carolina	Charleston Cougars Charleston Battery	Grass				
Patriot Stadium	3,000	El Paso	Texas	El Paso Patriots	Grass				
PayPal Park	18,000	San Jose	California	San Jose Earthquakes Bay FC 2025 CONCACAF Gold Cup venue Various international matches	Grass	2015	Hosted the 2016 MLS All-Star Game		
Pennington Field	12,000	Bedford	Texas	DFW Tornados High school soccer	Astroplay 1000	1987			
Petco Park	42,445	San Diego	California	Various international matches	Grass	2004			
Phoenix Rising Soccer Stadium	10,000	Phoenix	Arizona	Phoenix Rising FC	Grass	2023			
Pierce Memorial Field	8,000	Providence	Rhode Island		Grass				
Pitbull Stadium	20,000	Miami	Florida	Miami FC	FieldTurf	1995	Primarily used for FIU football		
Princeton Stadium	27,773	Princeton	New Jersey	Princeton Tigers	FieldTurf	1998			
Protective Stadium	47,100	Birmingham	Alabama	Birmingham Legion FC Birmingham Stallions UAB Blazers		2021			
Providence Park	25,218	Portland	Oregon	Portland Timbers Portland Thorns FC 1999 and 2003 FIFA Women's World Cup venue Various international matches	FieldTurf	1926	Renovated for soccer in 2011, added seats in 2012, widened field in 2013; hosted the 2014 MLS All-Star Game; previously known as Multnomah Stadium, Civic Stadium, PGE Park, and Jeld-Wen Field		
Q2 Stadium	20,500	Austin	Texas	Austin FC 2024 Copa América venue Multiple CONCACAF Gold Cups Various international matches	Grass	2021	Hosted the 2025 MLS All-Star Game		
Rabobank Stadium	5,250	Salinas	California	Local teams	FieldTurf		Part of Salinas Sports Complex which also includes a 17,000-seat rodeo stadium		
Ragin' Cajuns Soccer/Track Facility	5,000	Lafayette	Louisiana	Louisiana–Lafayette Ragin' Cajuns	Grass	1976			
Ralph Korte Stadium	4,000	Edwardsville	Illinois	SIUE Cougars	FieldTurf	1966 (Cougar Field); 1993			
Ram Stadium	5,000	Shepherdstown	West Virginia	Shepherd Rams	Grass				
Raymond James Stadium	66,231	Tampa	Florida	Various USA matches Formerly Tampa Bay Mutiny	Grass	1998	Also used for football		
Reinhart Field	1,500	New York City	New York	Maritime College Privateers	FieldTurf				
Pratt & Whitney Stadium at Rentschler Field	40,000	East Hartford	Connecticut	Various international matches Formerly Hartford Athletic Formerly Toronto FC (2020 only)	Grass	2003			
Rhodes Stadium	11,250	Elon	North Carolina	Elon Phoenix	Grass	2001			
Rice–Eccles Stadium	51,444	Salt Lake City	Utah	Formerly Real Salt Lake	FieldTurf	1927; 1998	Rebuilt on the site of Rice Stadium, primarily used for football; held the opening and closing ceremonies of the 2002 Winter Olympics		
Richardson Stadium	6,000	Davidson	North Carolina	Davidson Wildcats	Grass	1923			
Riggs Field	6,500	Clemson	South Carolina	Clemson Tigers	Grass	1915			
Robert K. Kraft Field at Lawrence A. Wien Stadium	17,000	New York City	New York	Columbia Lions	FieldTurf	1984			
Rochester Community Sports Complex Stadium	13,768	Rochester	New York	Rochester Rhinos Western New York Flash	FieldTurf	2006	Formerly PAETEC Park, Marina Auto Stadium, Rochester Rhinos Stadium and Sahlen's Stadium		
Rocky Mount Athletic Complex	5,000	Rocky Mount	North Carolina	North Carolina Wesleyan Bishops	Grass				
Rocky Stadium	15,000	Rock Island	Illinois	Rock Island High School	Grass		Also used for football and track		
Rose Bowl	94,542	Pasadena	California	1994 FIFA World Cup venue 1999 FIFA Women's World Cup venue Copa América Centenario venue Multiple CONCACAF Gold Cups UCLA Bruins Various international matches	Grass	1922	Also used for football; U.S. National Register of Historic Places site and a U.S. National Historic Landmark		
SHI Stadium	52,454	Piscataway	New Jersey	Occasional NCAA tournament matches 1995 U.S. Cup	FieldTurf	1994	Also used for football and lacrosse		
Sand Creek Stadium	3,500	Colorado Springs	Colorado	Formerly Colorado Springs Switchbacks	Grass	1985; 2015			
Sanford Stadium	92,746	Athens	Georgia	1996 Summer Olympics men and women's soccer finals	Grass	1929	Primarily used for football; located on the campus of the University of Georgia		
Schoenbaum Stadium	6,000	Charleston	West Virginia	West Virginia Alliance Local teams	FieldTurf	2000			
ScottsMiracle-Gro Field	20,000	Columbus	Ohio	Columbus Crew	Grass	2021	Hosted the 2024 MLS All-Star Game		
Setzler Field	4,000	Newberry	South Carolina	Newberry Indians	Grass				
SeatGeek Stadium	20,000	Bridgeview	Illinois	Formerly Chicago Fire Chicago Red Stars	Grass	2006	Formerly Toyota Park		
Segra Field	5,000	Leesburg	Virginia	Loudoun United Washington Spirit	Grass	2019			
Seminole Soccer Complex	2,000	Tallahassee	Florida	Florida State Seminoles	Grass	1999			
Shawnee Mission District Stadium	6,150	Overland Park	Kansas	Formerly FC Kansas City	Turf	2005	Site of the first NWSL match		
Shea Stadium	3,800	Peoria	Illinois	Bradley Braves Peoria City	Grass	1970	Built as a baseball stadium, converted into a soccer stadium in 2002		
Shell Energy Stadium	22,000	Houston	Texas	Houston Dynamo FC Houston Dash Multiple CONCACAF Gold Cups	Grass	2012			
Shuford Stadium	4,500	Salisbury	North Carolina	Catawba College Indians	Grass				
Simplot Stadium	4,001	Caldwell	Idaho	Local teams	Grass	1964			
Skidelsky Field at City Park Stadium	1,845	New Rochelle	New York	Westchester Flames					
Snapdragon Stadium	35,000	San Diego	California	San Diego FC San Diego Wave FC Multiple CONCACAF Gold Cups Various international matches and club friendlies	Grass	2022	Also used for football		
SoFi Stadium	70,240	Inglewood	California	2026 FIFA World Cup venue 2024 Copa América venue Multiple CONCACAF Gold Cups Various international matches	Matrix Turf	2020	Also used for football		
Soldier Field	61,500	Chicago	Illinois	Chicago Fire FC 1994 FIFA World Cup venue 1999 FIFA Women's World Cup venue Copa América Centenario venue Multiple CONCACAF Gold Cups	Grass	1924	Also used for football; renovated in 2003; hosted the 2017 MLS All-Star Game		
Southeastern Soccer Complex	1,000	Hammond	Louisiana	Southeastern Louisiana Lady Lions	Grass	2002			
Southwest University Park	7,500	El Paso	Texas	El Paso Locomotive FC	Grass	2014	Primarily used for baseball		
Spartan Stadium	5,000	Lima	Ohio	Lima High School Spartans	Artificial turf	1936	Also used for football and track		
Sporting Park	18,500	Kansas City	Kansas	Sporting Kansas City Sporting Kansas City II 2024 Copa América venue Multiple CONCACAF Gold Cups Various international matches	Grass	2011	Hosted the 2013 MLS All-Star Game		
Sports Backers Stadium	3,250	Richmond	Virginia	Richmond Kickers Future	Grass	1999			
Sports Illustrated Stadium	25,189	Harrison	New Jersey	New York Red Bulls Gotham FC Multiple CONCACAF Gold Cups Various international matches	Grass	2010	Hosted the 2011 MLS All-Star Game		
Sportsplex at Matthews	5,000	Matthews	North Carolina	Formerly Charlotte Independence Charlotte Eagles/Lady Eagles Stumptown Athletic	Grass	2017			
Spry Stadium	3,000	Winston-Salem	North Carolina	Wake Forest Demon Deacons	Grass	1996			
St. Louis Soccer Park	6,200	Fenton	Missouri	Formerly AC St. Louis Formerly Saint Louis Athletica Formerly St. Louis FC Local teams	FieldTurf	1987			
Stambaugh Stadium	20,630	Youngstown	Ohio	Youngstown State Penguins	SprinTurf	1982			
Stanford Stadium	50,000	Stanford	California	San Jose Earthquakes premier matches 1994 FIFA World Cup venue 1984 Summer Olympics venue (capacity then was 85,500)	Grass	1921; 2006	Rebuilt in 2006 on the site of the former stadium		
Starfire Sports Complex	2,500	Tukwila	Washington	Seattle Sounders FC 2 Seattle Reign FC FK Pacific Hibernian & Caledonian Formerly Seattle Sounders (USL-1)	FieldTurf	2005			
Stevens Stadium	7,000	Santa Clara	California	Santa Clara Broncos Formerly San Jose Earthquakes	Grass	1962	Renovated in 2008, formerly a baseball stadium named Buck Shaw Stadium		
Stone Stadium	6,000	Columbia	South Carolina	South Carolina Gamecocks	Grass	1981			
Strawberry Stadium	7,408	Hammond	Louisiana	Southeastern Louisiana Lions	Artificial turf	1937			
Student Activity Center	8,500	Laredo	Texas	Alexander Bulldogs LBJ Wolves United Longhorns United South Panthers	FieldTurf	2004			
Subaru Park	18,500	Chester	Pennsylvania	Philadelphia Union	Grass	2010	Hosted the 2012 MLS All-Star Game		
SU Soccer Stadium	1,500	Syracuse	New York	Syracuse Orange	Grass	1996			
Superior Dome	8,000	Marquette	Michigan	Northern Michigan Wildcats	FieldTurf	1991	Largest wooden some in the United States		
Switchbacks Training Stadium	5,000	Colorado Springs	Colorado	Formerly Colorado Springs Switchbacks	Grass	1985	Renovated in 2015		
Tad Gormley Stadium	26,500	New Orleans	Louisiana	Local teams	GameDay Grass	1937	Former home for USL A-League matches of the New Orleans Riverboat Gamblers		
Taft Stadium	7,500	Oklahoma City	Oklahoma	Oklahoma City Energy FC Oklahoma City Public Schools	Grass	1934	Renovated in 1999 and 2015		
TD Bank Ballpark	6,100	Bridgewater Township	New Jersey		Grass	1999			
Texas A&M International University Soccer Complex	4,000	Laredo	Texas	Laredo Heat Texas A&M International University Dustdevils	Grass	2006			
Titan Stadium	10,000	Fullerton	California	Cal State Fullerton Titans	Grass	1992			
Torero Stadium	6,000	San Diego	California	San Diego Toreros	Grass	1961	Also used for football and rugby		
Toyota Field	8,500	San Antonio	Texas	San Antonio FC Formerly San Antonio Scorpions	Grass	2012			
Toyota Stadium	21,193	Frisco	Texas	FC Dallas Multiple CONCACAF Gold Cups Various international matches	Grass	2005			
TQL Stadium	26,000	Cincinnati	Ohio	FC Cincinnati 2023 CONCACAF Gold Cup venue Various USA matches	Grass	2021			
Trinity Health Stadium	5,500	Hartford	Connecticut	Hartford Athletic	FieldTurf	1935	Renovated in 2019		
Tropical Park Stadium	7,000	Miami	Florida	Miami Dade FC FC Miami City Local teams	Grass	1979			
Turner Soccer Complex	1,750	Athens	Georgia	Georgia Bulldogs	Grass	1998			
U-M Soccer Complex	2,200	Ann Arbor	Michigan	University of Michigan Wolverines	Grass	2010			
UC Riverside Soccer Stadium	1,000	Riverside	California	UC Riverside Highlanders	Tiger Turf	2007			
UCF Soccer Complex	2,000	Orlando	Florida	UCF Knights	Grass	1991			
Uihlein Soccer Park	7,000	Milwaukee	Wisconsin	Milwaukee Kickers	Grass	1994			
UMBC Stadium	4,500	Catonsville	Maryland	UMBC Retrievers Crystal Palace Baltimore	Deso-Turf	1976			
UNCG Soccer Stadium	3,540	Greensboro	North Carolina	UNC Greensboro Spartans	Grass	1991			
State Farm Stadium	63,400	Glendale	Arizona	2016 and 2024 Copa América venue Multiple CONCACAF Gold Cups Various USA and Mexico matches	Grass	2006	Also used for football; retractable roof stadium		
University of Richmond Stadium	22,000	Richmond	Virginia	Richmond Kickers	Grass	1929	Was the site of the NCAA Division I Men's Soccer Championship from 1995 to 1998		
University Stadium	38,643	Albuquerque	New Mexico	Various USA matches	Grass	1960			
U.S. Bank Stadium	66,202	Minneapolis	Minnesota	2025 CONCACAF Gold Cup venue Various international club friendlies	Act Global turf	2016	Also used for football		
Ventura College Sportsplex	3,000	Ventura	California	Ventura County Fusion Ventura Pirates	Artificial turf	2009			
Vert Stadium	1,100	High Point	North Carolina	High Point Panthers	FieldTurf	2007	Also used for lacrosse		
Virginia Beach Sportsplex	6,000	Virginia Beach	Virginia	Virginia Beach United FC Local teams	Artificial turf	1999			
Virginia Revolution Sportsplex	1,500	Leesburg	Virginia	Northern Virginia FC	FieldTurf	2014	Hosted 2022 U.S. Open Cup second round match		
Waipi‘o Peninsula Soccer Stadium	4,500	Waipio	Hawaii	Hawaiʻi Rainbow Wahine	Grass	2000			
WakeMed Soccer Park	10,000	Cary	North Carolina	North Carolina Courage North Carolina FC North Carolina FC U23	Grass	2002			
War Memorial Stadium	23,000	Wailuku	Hawaii	Local matches	Grass	1969			
Warren McGuirk Alumni Stadium	17,000	Hadley	Massachusetts	1987 NCAA women's soccer championship	Grass	1965			
Waukee Stadium	6,200	Waukee	Iowa	Formerly Des Moines Menace High school soccer	Grass	1996			
Weidner Field	8,000	Colorado Springs	Colorado	Colorado Springs Switchbacks	Grass	2021			
Werner Park	9,023	Papillion	Nebraska	Union Omaha	Grass	2011	Primarily used for baseball		
Westside Athletic Complex	2,500	Danbury	Connecticut	West Conn Colonials AC Connecticut	SprintTurf	2003	Also used for football, lacrosse, and field hockey		
Whataburger Field	7,679	Corpus Christi	Texas	Corpus Christi Hooks	Grass	2005			
Wheeling Island Stadium	12,220	Wheeling	West Virginia	High school soccer	Grass	1927	Renovated in 1987		
Wild Horse Pass	10,000	Chandler	Arizona	Formerly Phoenix Rising FC	Grass	2021			
William Rolland Stadium	2,000	Thousand Oaks	California	California Lutheran Kingsmen	Grass	2011	Also used for football and track		
WRAL Soccer Center	3,200	Raleigh	North Carolina	Local teams	Grass	1981			
Yankee Stadium	54,251	New York City	New York	New York City FC Various international matches	Grass	2009	Primarily used for baseball		
Zions Bank Stadium	5,000	Herriman	Utah	Real Monarchs	Artificial turf	2018	Host of the 2020 NWSL Challenge Cup		

== See also ==
- List of Major League Soccer stadiums
- List of NASL stadiums
- List of U.S. stadiums by capacity
- List of soccer specific stadiums
- List of association football stadiums by capacity
- List of association football stadiums by country
- List of sports venues by capacity
- Lists of stadiums
- Soccer in the United States
