= List of Major League Soccer stadiums =

Major League Soccer (MLS) is the premier professional soccer league in the United States and Canada. The league has 30 teams in 30 stadiums as of the 2025 season: 27 in the United States and 3 in Canada. At the time of the league's inauguration in 1996, MLS teams used multi-purpose stadiums, often shared with National Football League (NFL) or college football teams. Because of lower attendance, these stadiums had rows of seats covered in tarps to limit capacity. Starting in 1999 with the Columbus Crew's construction of Historic Crew Stadium, the league has constructed soccer-specific stadiums, which are tailor-made for soccer and which tend to have smaller capacity. As of 2025, 22 of 30 MLS stadiums are soccer-specific stadiums, which generally have a capacity of 18,000 to 30,000 seats. While the league's early stadiums relied heavily on public financing, several modern soccer-specific stadiums have been majority-funded by clubs and their owners.

The league's soccer-specific stadiums, with the exception of Providence Park in Portland, Oregon, have grass playing surfaces. The remaining stadiums with artificial turf surfaces are mostly used by teams sharing their venues with other sports, including American football.

As with the other major North American sports leagues, the majority of MLS stadiums have sold their naming rights to corporations. BC Place, Soldier Field, Sporting Park, and Yankee Stadium are the only current MLS stadiums without a corporate-sponsored name.

Location of MLS team stadiums: Western Conference Eastern Conference Future

== Current stadiums ==
The following is a list of current primary MLS stadiums.

Soccer-specific stadium
Reduced capacity
(full capacity)
‡ Stadiums with a retractable roof

Image	Stadium	Team	Location	First MLS year in stadium	Capacity	Opened	Surface	Field dimensions	Coordinates	Roof type	Ref(s)
	Allianz Field	Minnesota United FC	Saint Paul, Minnesota	2019	19,400	2019	Grass	115 yd × 75 yd (105 m × 69 m)	44°57′10″N 93°9′54″W	Open	
	America First Field	Real Salt Lake	Sandy, Utah	2008	20,213	2008	Grass	120 yd × 75 yd (110 m × 69 m)	40.582923°N 111.893156°W	Open	
	Audi Field	D.C. United	Washington, D.C.	2018	20,000	2018	Grass	115 yd × 75 yd (105 m × 69 m)	38°52′6″N 77°0′44″W	Open	
	Bank of America Stadium	Charlotte FC	Charlotte, North Carolina	2022	38,000 (74,867)	1996	FieldTurf	TBA	35°13′33″N 80°51′10″W	Open	
	BC Place ‡	Vancouver Whitecaps FC	Vancouver, British Columbia	2011	22,120 (54,500)	1983	Polytan	117 yd × 75 yd (107 m × 69 m)	49°16′36″N 123°6′43″W	Retractable	
	BMO Field	Toronto FC	Toronto, Ontario	2007	28,351 (Note: Temporary capacity for first half of 2026 MLS season and World Cup games: 25,000)	2007	Hybrid grass (SISGrass)	115 yd × 74 yd (105 m × 68 m)	43°37′58″N 79°25′07″W	Open	
	BMO Stadium	Los Angeles FC	Los Angeles, California	2018	22,000	2018	Grass	115 yd × 75 yd (105 m × 69 m)	34°00′47″N 118°17′6″W	Open	
	Dick's Sporting Goods Park	Colorado Rapids	Commerce City, Colorado	2007	18,061	2007	Grass	120 yd × 75 yd (110 m × 69 m)	39°48′20″N 104°53′31″W	Open	
	Dignity Health Sports Park	LA Galaxy	Carson, California	2003	27,000	2003	Grass	120 yd × 75 yd (110 m × 69 m)	33°51′52″N 118°15′40″W	Open	
	Energizer Park	St. Louis City SC	St. Louis, Missouri	2023	22,423	2022	Grass	114 yd × 74 yd (104 m × 68 m)	38°37′51.7″N 90°12′39.3″W	Open	
	Gillette Stadium	New England Revolution	Foxborough, Massachusetts	2002	20,000 (65,878)	2002	FieldTurf	115 yd × 75 yd (105 m × 69 m)	42°05′27.40″N 71°15′51.64″W	Open	
	Geodis Park	Nashville SC	Nashville, Tennessee	2022	30,000	2022	Grass	120 yd × 75 yd (110 m × 69 m)	36°7′49″N 86°45′56″W	Open	
	Inter.co Stadium	Orlando City SC	Orlando, Florida	2017	25,500	2017	Grass	120 yd × 75 yd (110 m × 69 m)	28°37′27.83″N 81°23′20.53″W	Open	
	Lumen Field	Seattle Sounders FC	Seattle, Washington	2009	37,722 (68,740)	2002	FieldTurf	114 yd × 74 yd (104 m × 68 m)	47.5952°N 122.3316°W	Open	
	Mercedes-Benz Stadium ‡	Atlanta United FC	Atlanta, Georgia	2017	42,500 (71,000)	2017	FieldTurf	115 yd × 75 yd (105 m × 69 m)	33°45′19.30″N 84°24′4.29″W	Retractable	
	Nu Stadium	Inter Miami CF	Miami, Florida	2026	26,700	2026	Grass	120 yd × 75 yd (110 m × 69 m)	25.7766°N 80.2378°W	Open	
	PayPal Park	San Jose Earthquakes	San Jose, California	2015	18,000	2015	SISGrass (hybrid)	115 yd × 75 yd (105 m × 69 m)	37°21′5″N 121°55′30″W	Open	
	Providence Park	Portland Timbers	Portland, Oregon	2011	25,218	1926	FieldTurf	110 yd × 75 yd (101 m × 69 m)	45°31′17″N 122°41′30″W	Open	
	Q2 Stadium	Austin FC	Austin, Texas	2021	20,738	2021	Grass	115 yd × 75 yd (105 m × 69 m)	30°23′17.54″N 97°43′11.51″W	Open	
	Saputo Stadium	CF Montréal	Montreal, Quebec	2012	19,619	2008	Grass	120 yd × 77 yd (110 m × 70 m)	45°33′47″N 73°33′9″W	Open	
	ScottsMiracle-Gro Field	Columbus Crew	Columbus, Ohio	2021	20,371	2021	Grass	120 yd × 75 yd (110 m × 69 m)	39°58′6.46″N 83°1′1.52″W	Open	
	Shell Energy Stadium	Houston Dynamo FC	Houston, Texas	2012	20,656	2012	Grass	115 yd × 73 yd (105 m × 67 m)	29°45.132′N 95°21.144′W	Open	
	Snapdragon Stadium	San Diego FC	San Diego, California	2025	35,000	2022	Grass	110 yd × 70 yd (101 m × 64 m)	32°47′04.0″N 117°7′22.2″W	Open	
	Soldier Field	Chicago Fire FC	Chicago, Illinois	1998	24,955 (61,500)	1924	Grass	114 yd × 74 yd (104 m × 68 m)	41.8623°N 87.6167°W	Open	
	Sporting Park	Sporting Kansas City	Kansas City, Kansas	2011	18,467	2011	Grass	120 yd × 75 yd (110 m × 69 m)	39.1218°N 94.8237°W	Open	
	Sports Illustrated Stadium	New York Red Bulls	Harrison, New Jersey	2010	25,000	2010	Grass	120 yd × 75 yd (110 m × 69 m)	40°44′12″N 74°9′1″W	Open	
	Subaru Park	Philadelphia Union	Chester, Pennsylvania	2010	18,500	2010	Grass	120 yd × 75 yd (110 m × 69 m)	39°49′56″N 75°22′44″W	Open	
	Toyota Stadium	FC Dallas	Frisco, Texas	2005	19,096	2005	Grass	117 yd × 74 yd (107 m × 68 m)	33°9′16″N 96°50′7″W	Open	
	TQL Stadium	FC Cincinnati	Cincinnati, Ohio	2021	26,000	2021	Hybrid grass	110 yd × 75 yd (101 m × 69 m)	39°06′41″N 84°31′20″W	Open	
	Yankee Stadium	New York City FC	The Bronx, New York	2015	30,321 (47,309)	2009	Grass	110 yd × 70 yd (101 m × 64 m)	40°49′45″N 73°55′35″W	Open	

== Future stadiums ==
The following is a table of future MLS stadiums that are undergoing construction, have been approved for construction, or are existing venues that are planned to be used by a future team.

Vancouver Whitecaps FC are exploring the possibility of building a new stadium at the Hastings Racecourse.

Seattle Sounders FC are exploring the possibility of building a new stadium near the team’s practice facility in Renton after their lease expires at Lumen Field.

FC Dallas are currently renovating Toyota Stadium, with the increased capacity going up to 22,500 when it fully opens in 2028.

CF Montreal is slated to move into a renovated Olympic Stadium full time during the winter months starting in 2028.

Soccer-specific stadium
Reduced capacity
(full capacity)
‡ Stadiums with a retractable roof

Stadium	Team	Location	Capacity	Construction begin	Planned opening	Surface	Roof type	Soccer specific	Ref(s)
Etihad Park	New York City FC	Queens, New York	25,000	2024	2027	Grass	Open	Yes	
McDonald's Park	Chicago Fire FC	Chicago, Illinois	22,000	2026	2028	Grass	Open	Yes	
Future New England Revolution Stadium	New England Revolution	Everett, Massachusetts	24,000	2026 or 2027	TBD	Grass	Open	Yes	

== Former stadiums ==
The following is a list of former MLS stadiums.

Soccer-specific stadium
Reduced capacity
(full capacity)

Image	Stadium	Franchise(s)	Location	Used for MLS	Capacity	Opened	Surface	Ref(s)
	Arrowhead Stadium	Kansas City Wizards	Kansas City, Missouri	1996–2007, 2024	20,269 (79,451) (Note: For most of the Wizards' history at Arrowhead, the team did not sell tickets in most of the stadium. At different times, either one side of the stadium or the upper seating bowl was tarped off.)	1972	Grass	
	Bobby Dodd Stadium at Hyundai Field	Atlanta United FC	Atlanta, Georgia	2017	55,000	1913	Grass	
	Buck Shaw Stadium	San Jose Earthquakes	Santa Clara, California	2008–2014	10,525	1962	Grass	
	Camping World Stadium	Orlando City SC	Orlando, Florida	2015–2016	19,500 (65,438)	1936	AstroTurf	
	Cardinal Stadium	Chicago Fire	Naperville, Illinois	2002–2003	15,000	1999	FieldTurf	
	CommunityAmerica Ballpark	Kansas City Wizards	Kansas City, Kansas	2008–2010	10,385	2003	Grass	
	Cotton Bowl	Dallas Burn	Dallas, Texas	1996–2002, 2004–2005	25,425 (92,100)	1932	Grass	
	Dragon Stadium	Dallas Burn	Southlake, Texas	2003	11,000	2001		
	Empire Field	Vancouver Whitecaps FC	Vancouver, British Columbua	2011	20,500	2010	FieldTurf	
	Foxboro Stadium	New England Revolution	Foxborough, Massachusetts	1996–2001	24,871 (60,292)	1971	Grass	
	Giants Stadium	New York Red Bulls; NY/NJ MetroStars	East Rutherford, New Jersey	1996–2009	25,576 (78,148)	1976	Grass; AstroTurf; FieldTurf	
	Historic Crew Stadium	Columbus Crew	Columbus, Ohio	1999–2021	19,968	1999	Grass	
	Inter Miami CF Stadium	Inter Miami CF	Fort Lauderdale, Florida	2020–2025	21,500	2020	Grass	
	Invesco Field at Mile High	Colorado Rapids	Denver, Colorado	2002–2006	17,500 (76,125)	2001	Grass	
	Mile High Stadium	Colorado Rapids	Denver, Colorado	1996–2001	17,500 (76,273)	1948	Grass	
	Navy–Marine Corps Memorial Stadium	D.C. United	Annapolis, Maryland	2018	34,000	1959	FieldTurf	
	Nippert Stadium	FC Cincinnati	Cincinnati, Ohio	2019–2021	32,250 (40,000)	1915	Act Global UBU Sports Speed M6-M	
	Nissan Stadium	Nashville SC	Nashville, Tennessee	2020–2021	N/A (69,143)	1999	Grass	
	Oakland–Alameda County Coliseum	San Jose Earthquakes	Oakland, California	2008–2009	47,416 (63,132)	1966	Grass	
	Ohio Stadium	Columbus Crew	Columbus, Ohio	1996–1998	25,243 (104,944)	1922	Grass	
	RFK Stadium	D.C. United	Washington, D.C.	1996–2017	20,000 (45,596)	1961	Grass	
	Rice–Eccles Stadium	Real Salt Lake	Salt Lake City, Utah	2005–2008	24,521 (45,634)	1927	FieldTurf	
	Robertson Stadium	Houston Dynamo	Houston, Texas	2006–2011	25,462 (32,000)	1941	Grass	
	Rose Bowl	Los Angeles Galaxy	Pasadena, California	1996–2002, 2023-2024	26,000; 82,110 (104,091)	1922	Grass	
	SeatGeek Stadium	Chicago Fire	Bridgeview, Illinois	2006–2019	20,000	2006	Grass	
	Spartan Stadium	San Jose Earthquakes	San Jose, California	1996–2005	19,166 (31,218)	1933	Grass	
	TCF Bank Stadium	Minnesota United FC	Minneapolis, Minnesota	2017–2018	21,895 (50,805)	2009	FieldTurf	

== Defunct teams ==
Soccer-specific stadium
Reduced capacity
(full capacity)

Image	Stadium	Team(s)	Location	Used for MLS	Capacity	Opened	Surface	Field dimensions	Ref(s)
	Houlihan's Stadium	Tampa Bay Mutiny	Tampa, Florida	1996–1998	16,000 (65,857)	1967	Grass	unknown	
	Lockhart Stadium	Miami Fusion	Fort Lauderdale, Florida	1998–2002	20,450	1959	Grass	116 by 75 yards (106 m × 69 m)	
	Miami Orange Bowl	Miami Fusion	Miami, Florida	2000–2001	23,739 (74,476)	1937	Natural Grass		
	Raymond James Stadium	Tampa Bay Mutiny	Tampa, Florida	1999–2002	32,000 (65,857)	1998	Grass	115 by 72 yards (105 m × 66 m)	
	Dignity Health Sports Park	Chivas USA	Carson, California	2005–2014 (Chivas USA)	18,800 (27,000)	2003	Grass	120 by 75 yards (110 m × 69 m)	

== See also ==
- List of soccer stadiums in the United States
- List of soccer stadiums in Canada
- List of current Major League Baseball stadiums
- List of National Basketball Association arenas
- List of current National Football League stadiums
- List of National Hockey League arenas
- List of association football stadiums by country
- Lists of stadiums
