= List of NASL stadiums =

This is a list of North American Soccer League stadiums. Some of these stadiums for the North American Soccer League teams are soccer-specific stadiums; others are multi-purpose stadiums shared with other teams.

== NASL stadiums ==
The following list includes former venues and stadiums where promotional matches have been played.

Soccer-specific stadium

Stadium	Club(s)	Location	Capacity	Used
Saputo Stadium	Montreal Impact	Montreal, Quebec	13,034	2011
Foote Field	FC Edmonton	Edmonton, Alberta	3,500	2011
Atlanta Silverbacks Park	Atlanta Silverbacks	Atlanta, Georgia	5,000	2011–2015
Lockhart Stadium	Fort Lauderdale Strikers	Fort Lauderdale, Florida	20,450	2011–2016
National Sports Center	Minnesota United FC	Blaine, Minnesota	10,000	2011–2016
Al Lang Stadium	Tampa Bay Rowdies	St. Petersburg, Florida	7,227	2011–2016
WakeMed Soccer Park	North Carolina FC	Cary, North Carolina	10,000	2011–2017
Clarke Stadium	FC Edmonton	Edmonton, Alberta	5,000	2011–2017
Heroes Stadium	San Antonio Scorpions	San Antonio, Texas	11,122	2012
Hubert H. Humphrey Metrodome	Minnesota United FC	Minneapolis, Minnesota	64,121	2012–2013
Toyota Field	San Antonio Scorpions	San Antonio, Texas	8,296	2013–2015
James M. Shuart Stadium	New York Cosmos	Hempstead, New York	11,929	2013–2016
Keith Harris Stadium	Ottawa Fury FC	Ottawa, Ontario	3,044	2014
TD Place Stadium	Ottawa Fury FC	Ottawa, Ontario	24,000	2014–2016
Michael A. Carroll Stadium	Indy Eleven	Indianapolis, Indiana	12,111	2014–2017
SMS Equipment Stadium	FC Edmonton	Fort McMurray, Alberta	5,000	2015
EverBank Field	Jacksonville Armada FC	Jacksonville, Florida	67,246	2015
Baseball Grounds of Jacksonville	Jacksonville Armada FC	Jacksonville, Florida	11,000	2015–2016
Central Broward Stadium	Fort Lauderdale Strikers	Lauderhill, Florida	20,000	2016
Juan Ramón Loubriel Stadium	Puerto Rico FC	Bayamón, Puerto Rico	22,000	2016–2017
Riccardo Silva Stadium	Miami FC	Miami, Florida	20,000	2016–2017
Miller Stadium	Rayo OKC	Yukon, Oklahoma	6,000	2016
Kezar Stadium	San Francisco Deltas	San Francisco, California	10,000	2017
Hodges Stadium	Jacksonville Armada FC	Jacksonville, Florida	12,000	2017
MCU Park	New York Cosmos	Brooklyn, New York	7,000	2017

== See also ==
- List of Major League Soccer stadiums
- Soccer-specific stadium
