= Harder Stadium =

Stadium in Santa Barbara, California, United States

- Soccer Heaven

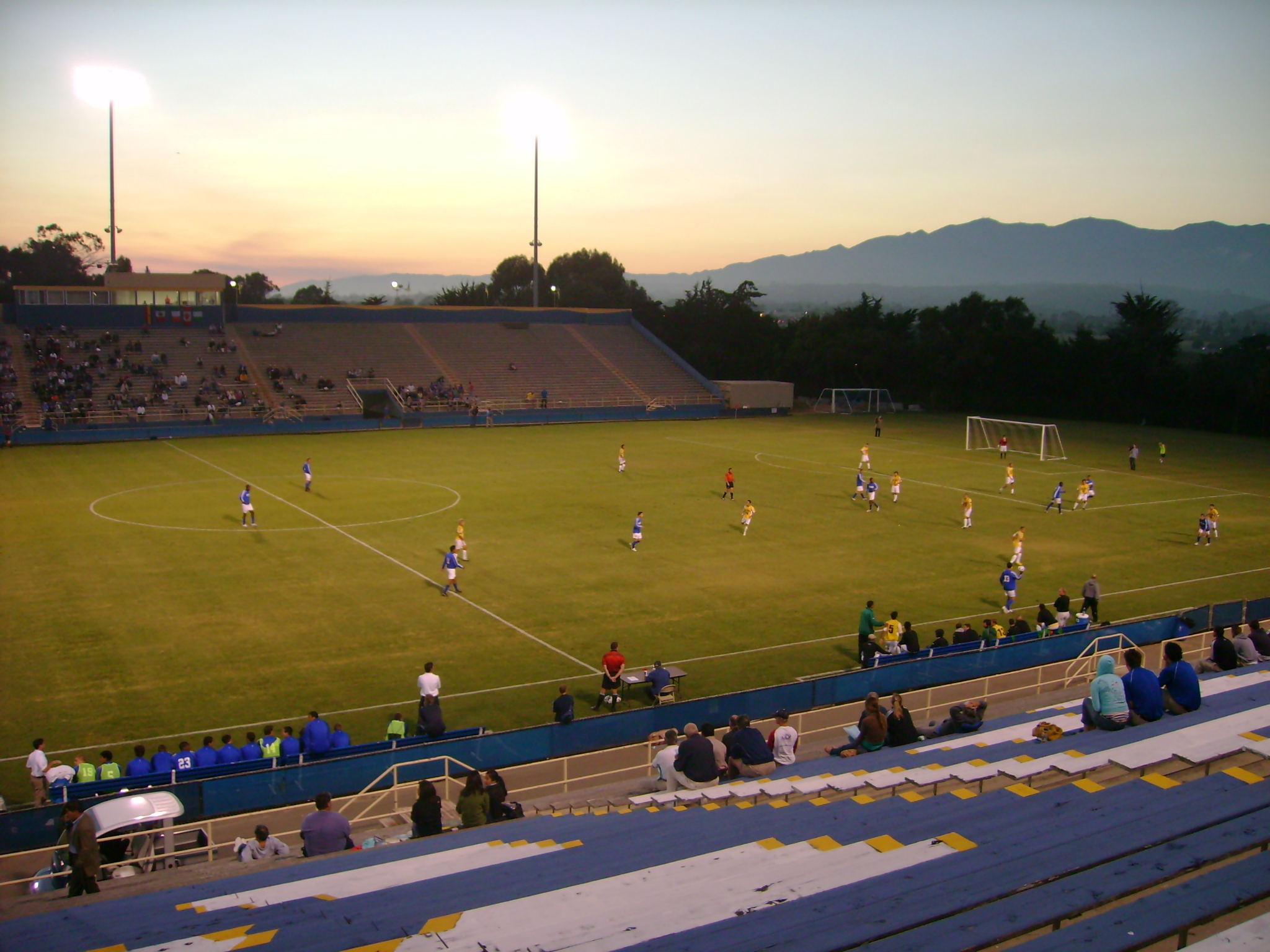
- The stadium in 2006

- Location in the United States Location in California
- Full name: Meredith Field at Harder Stadium
- Former names: Campus Stadium (1966–1981)
- Address: Stadium Road
- Location: University of California, Santa Barbara; California, United States
- Coordinates: 34.42°N 119.854°W
- Owner: University of California, Santa Barbara
- Operator: University of California, Santa Barbara
- Seating type: Reserved seating and benches
- Capacity: 17,000
- Executive suites: 0
- Type: Stadium
- Event: Sporting events
- Surface: Lawn
- Scoreboard: Yes
- Record attendance: 20,000+
- Field shape: Rectangular
- Public transit: El Colegio & Stadium Rd., Santa Barbara MTD

Construction
- Opened: November 12, 1966; 59 years ago
- Renovated: 2010
- Expanded: 1970

Tenants
- UC Santa Barbara Gauchos (NCAA) teams: men's and women's soccer; football (1966–1971, 1986–1991); Professional teams: Santa Barbara Sky (USLC) (beginning 2027)

Website
- ucsb.edu/harder-stadium

Harder Stadium is a 17,000-seat, outdoor multi-purpose stadium located on the campus of the University of California, Santa Barbara in Santa Barbara, California, United States. It serves as home for the UC Santa Barbara Gauchos men's and women's soccer programs. Currently used occasionally by the university's club rugby and lacrosse teams, it was originally the home of the defunct football program.

== History ==
The stadium was built 60 years ago in 1966 and is named after Theodore "Spud" Harder, a former coach of the Gauchos' football team. The stadium hosted Vince Lombardi and the Green Bay Packers in January 1967 for their practices in the week ahead of the first Super Bowl.

The UCSB football team played their home games at Harder Stadium until football was cut after the 1971 season due to budget cuts. UCSB brought football back as a non-scholarship sport in 1983 and by 1987 it was playing a full Division II and III schedule. In 1992, the NCAA ruled that Division I colleges must play at the Division I level in all sports; UCSB and a few other universities attempted to form a non-scholarship Division I-AAA level, but the effort failed and UCSB eventually dropped football. The stadium has a capacity of 17,000, and currently is the largest stadium on California's central coast. Along with the UCSB Events Center, it is one of the more well-attended athletic venues on the central coast.

Harder Stadium hosted a memorial service for the victims of the 2014 Isla Vista Killings. The attendees included UC President Janet Napolitano, and over 20,000 students, staff, alumni, and community members. The stadium seats were filled over capacity as thousands more sat on the grass field.

== Soccer legacy ==
Harder Stadium sees most of its present-day use as a soccer stadium to the UCSB men's soccer and women's soccer teams. The stadium hosted the final three matches of the 2010 College Cup. However, numerous professional club and international teams have played in Harder Stadium as well.

=== UC Santa Barbara teams ===
Due to the success of the men's program, the stadium has hosted numerous NCAA soccer playoff games in addition to the regular season games. Despite the men's program's recent success, the women's program first brought the NCAA Tournaments to Harder Stadium. The women hosted the first soccer NCAA Tournament game in a 1985 4–3 victory against Cal State Hayward. In total, the women's program has held 4 NCAA Tournament matches at Harder Stadium, bringing such opponents as the Wisconsin Badgers, Stanford Cardinal, and Hartford Hawks.

The men's program hosted their first men's NCAA Tournament game in 2002, blanking the San Diego Toreros 2–0. In total, they have hosted 9 NCAA Tournament games.

In 2004, 11,214 fans saw UCSB defeat VCU 4–1 to reach the College Cup (NCAA Soccer's "Final Four"). After the game, a group of students celebrated by carrying one of the soccer goals out of the stadium. They had planned to throw it into the Pacific Ocean (about 1/3 mile away), but were stopped by a combination of law enforcement down the block and tiring out from the weight of the goal.

However, in 2006, the UCSB won the 2006 Division I Men's College Cup in St. Louis, Missouri. Meanwhile, 2,000 miles away at Harder Stadium, a group of rowdy students marched down to the stadium from their homes and attempted the same feat. This time the group succeeded in their quest, throwing the soccer goal off of a cliff at the beginning of the 6600 block of Del Playa Drive.

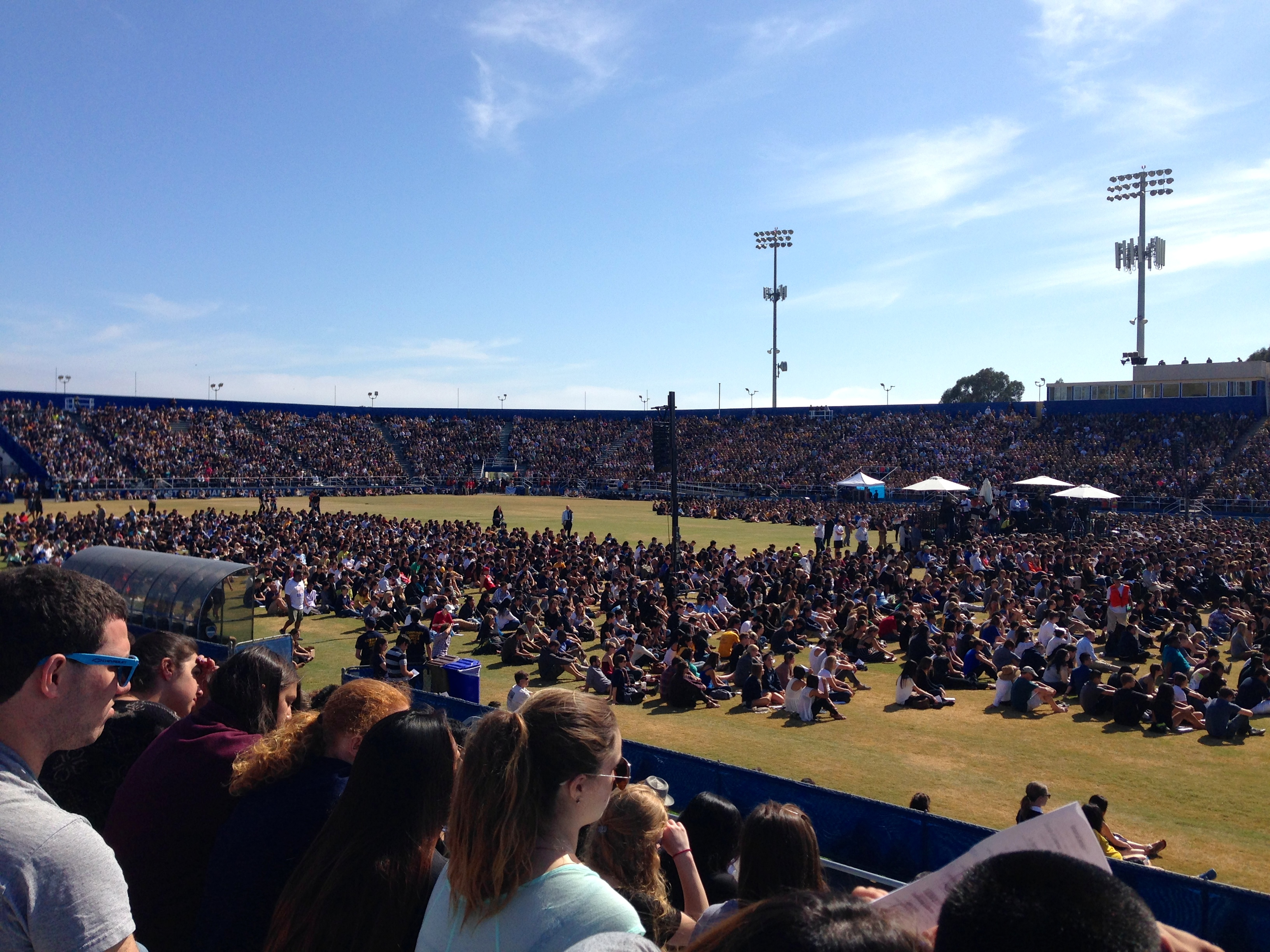
Over 20,000 were in attendance for a memorial service for the 2014 Isla Vista killings

In 2009, the NCAA awarded UCSB and Harder Stadium the 2010 Division I Men's College Cup, which is the "Final Four" of Division I men's soccer.

On September 24, 2010, the UCSB gaucho fans set a record on the highest attendance at any NCAA (on campus) soccer match. UCSB beat the visiting UCLA team (2-0) in front of 15,896 who attended the game.

Additional UCSB teams that use the stadium for select contests are the UCSB women's lacrosse, men's lacrosse and rugby teams. These teams are part of the UCSB Recreation Department and open to all students.

=== Other teams ===
Due to the large capacity of Harder Stadium, it is often used by professional teams' exhibition games. In 1991, the US Women's National Team played there before the 1991 FIFA Women's World Cup. Likewise, the US Men's National Team played there in 1993 against the Romanian National Team.

Club teams also have played at Harder Stadium. In March 2004, the San Jose Earthquakes and Los Angeles Galaxy played a pre-season exhibition in Santa Barbara. Following the success of MLS teams at Harder, in March 2006 & 2007, the UC Santa Barbara men's team played exhibition matches against the Columbus Crew while in July 2006, Cruz Azul and Los Angeles Galaxy played. March 2007 also saw Shizuoka Sangyō University of Japan play against UCSB. March 2009 saw América and Monarcas Morelia played, while UCSB was scheduled to play against the Mexican U-17 National Team. A friendly between Wrexham and Bournemouth took place on July 20, 2024, in front of 13,322 people.

On June 18, 2024, it was announced that the Santa Barbara Sky of USL League One had signed a multi-year deal to bring professional soccer to the stadium. On November 13, 2024, the United Soccer League announced that the USL Championship franchise rights held by Memphis 901 FC had been transferred to Santa Barbara Sky FC which, then, was to begin play in the USL Championship in 2026. On August 28, 2026, Sky founder Peter Moore told Diego Sandoval of Noozhawk that the ownership group could not come to terms with UCSB on a lease agreement and there was no new timetable for the team to begin play.

== Non-sporting activities ==
Every year, the school's Associated Students Program Board have thrown a free day-long party, known as EXTRAVAGANZA, at Harder Stadium. Previous bands to have played at the festival include Fleetwood Mac, The Grateful Dead, Sublime, No Doubt, Jack Johnson, T.I., Run-D.M.C., Coolio, Busta Rhymes, The Black Eyed Peas, Jane's Addiction, MxPx, Social Distortion, Eve 6, Pepper, Slightly Stoopid, Ludacris, Nas, Hellogoodbye, and E-40.

Harder Stadium also houses 18 art studios located beneath the seating risers. They are primarily used by graduate students and faculty.

Preceded by WakeMed Soccer Park; Talen Energy Stadium	Host of the College Cup; 2010; 2018	Succeeded by Regions Park; WakeMed Soccer Park
