= Saputo Stadium =

Soccer-specific stadium in Montreal

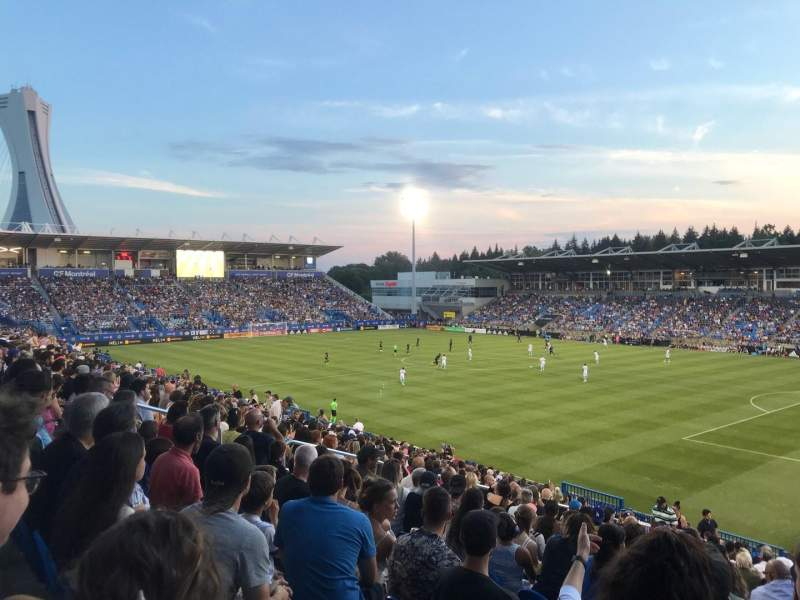
- Saputo Stadium in 2023

- Location in Montreal Location in Southern Quebec Location in Quebec Location in Canada
- Address: 4750 Sherbrooke Street E
- Location: Montreal, Quebec, Canada
- Coordinates: 45°33′47″N 73°33′9″W
- Owner: Saputo Inc.
- Operator: CF Montréal
- Capacity: 19,619
- Surface: Grass
- Field size: 120 by 75 yards (110 m × 69 m)
- Public transit: Montreal Metro: Viau; Pie-IX

Construction
- Groundbreaking: April 18, 2007
- Opened: May 18, 2008
- Expanded: June 16, 2012
- Cost: C$47 million
- Architects: Zinno Zappitelli Architectes (2008); Provencher Roy + Associés Architectes (2012)
- Services engineer: CIMA+ Engineering
- General contractor: Broccolini Construction Inc.
- Main contractor: Dant Clayton Corporation

Tenants
- CF Montréal (MLS) (2012–present); Montreal Impact (NASL) (2008–2011); Montreal Impact U23 (PDL) (2014); Montreal Impact Academy (CSL) (2010–2012); Canada men's national soccer team (2008–); FC Montreal (USL) (2015–2016)

Saputo Stadium (French: Stade Saputo) is a soccer-specific stadium at Olympic Park in the borough of Mercier–Hochelaga-Maisonneuve in Montreal, Quebec, Canada. The stadium opened on May 21, 2008, and is the current home of CF Montréal (formerly the Montreal Impact). The stadium is built on the former practice track and field site on the grounds of the 1976 Summer Olympics, while the stadium's east side has a view of Olympic Stadium's inclined tower. It has a capacity of 19,619, making it the second-largest soccer-specific stadium in Canada, after BMO Field in Toronto.

In North American competitions, the stadium is known as Stade de Montréal due to advertising rules.

== Construction ==
The stadium cost CA$17 million ($24.5 million in 2025 dollars) to build, with $7.5 million paid by the Saputo family and the rest financed on a 25-year term. Saputo Stadium is now CF Montréal's administrative headquarters and also includes a training field, 34 corporate suites and full player welfare areas. The complex covers approximately 150,000 square metres (1,600,000 sq ft). It was designed and fabricated by Dant Clayton Corporation and built by Broccolini Construction Inc.

The stadium features a natural grass playing surface and was reportedly preferred over BMO Field and its then-artificial turf by members of the Canada men's national soccer team. BMO Field has since installed a heated and irrigated hybrid (mixed artificial and natural grass) field.

Anticipating a Montreal entry into Major League Soccer, plans were made to expand the stadium from its initial 13,034 capacity to 20,000 to cope with the anticipated boost in attendance. The Quebec government put $23 million for the renovation and expansion of the stadium (the total cost of the stadium was therefore about $40 million). The construction plans went into effect after MLS granted Montreal their nineteenth franchise, which began play in the 2012 season.

== Sports usage ==
The stadium welcomed its first Impact home game on May 19, 2008, a scoreless draw against the Vancouver Whitecaps. The Impact's first goal in the stadium was scored by Rocco Placentino against the Charleston Battery on June 13, 2008. This also gave the Impact its first victory in the stadium, with a score of 1–0. The Impact's first game in the newly renovated and expanded Saputo was played on June 16, 2012, against the Seattle Sounders FC. The Impact won the game 4–1.

The only official international matches played at Saputo Stadium were two matches played by Canada men's national soccer team during the 2010 FIFA World Cup qualification (CONCACAF).

== Gallery ==
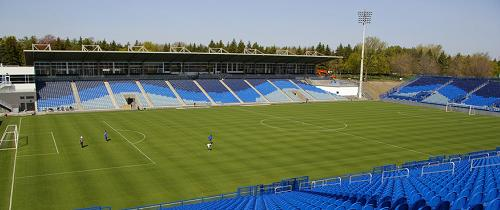
View inside the stadium prior to expansion

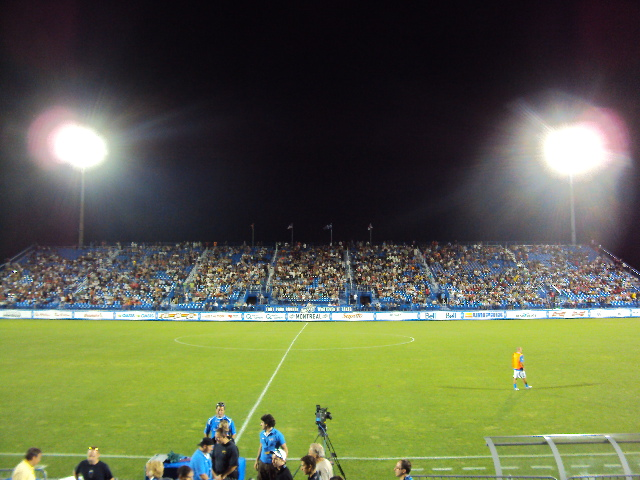
Saputo Stadium at night prior to expansion

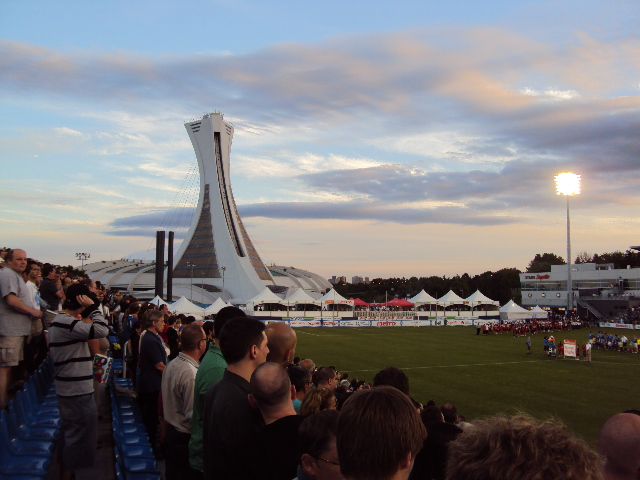
Stadium in 2010 prior to expansion

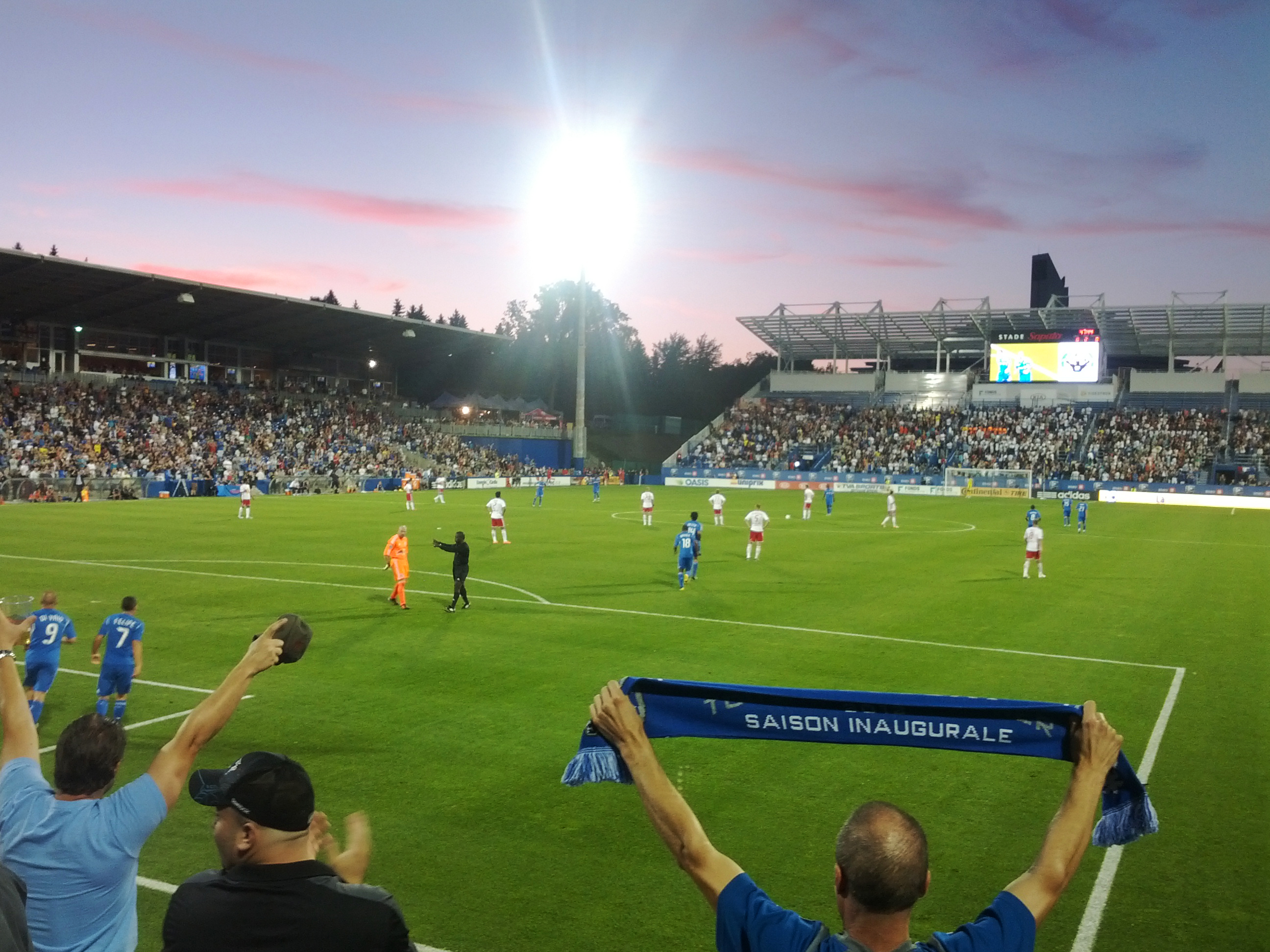
Home match against New York Red Bulls in 2012

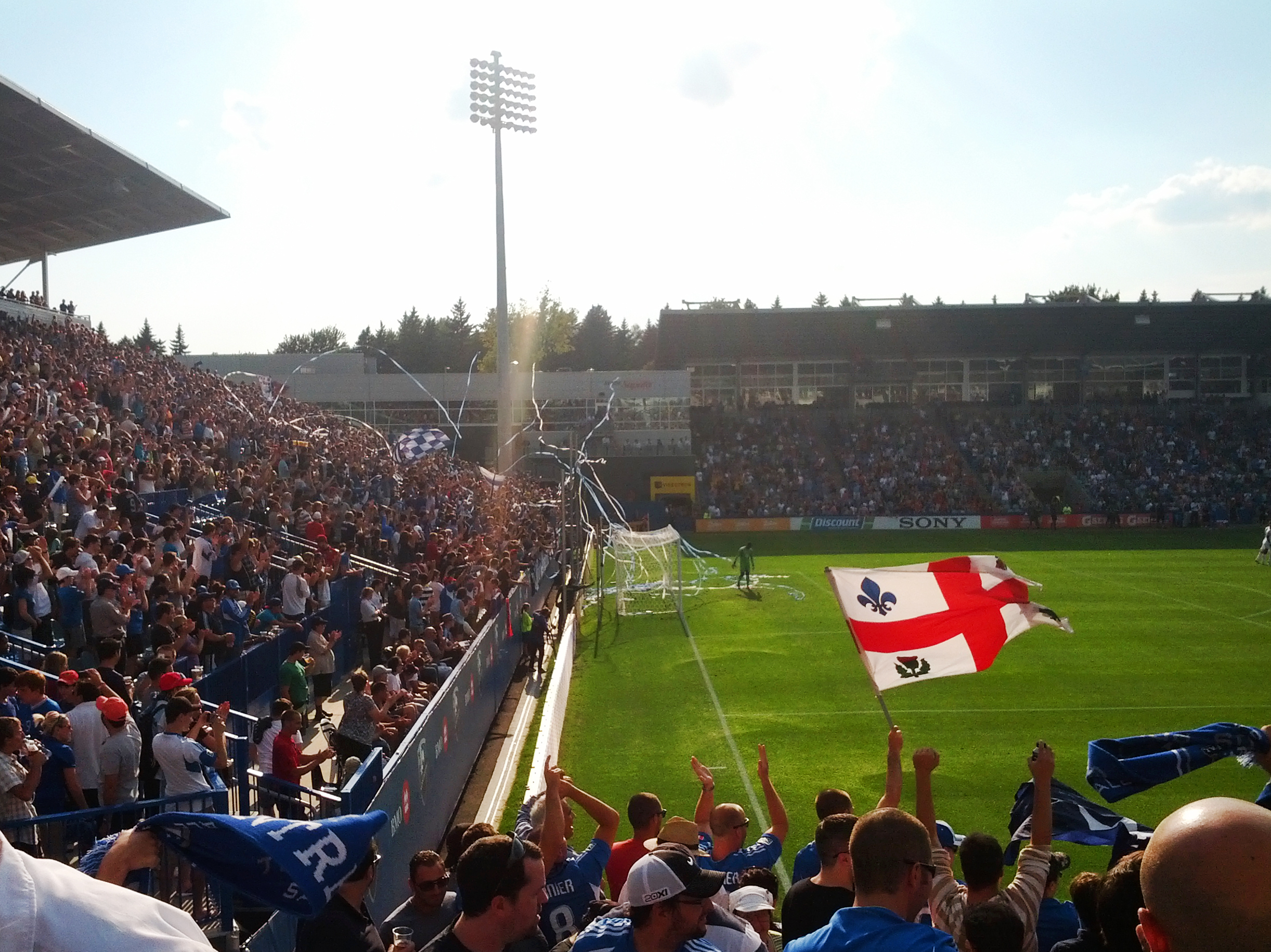
Goal celebration against D.C. United in 2012

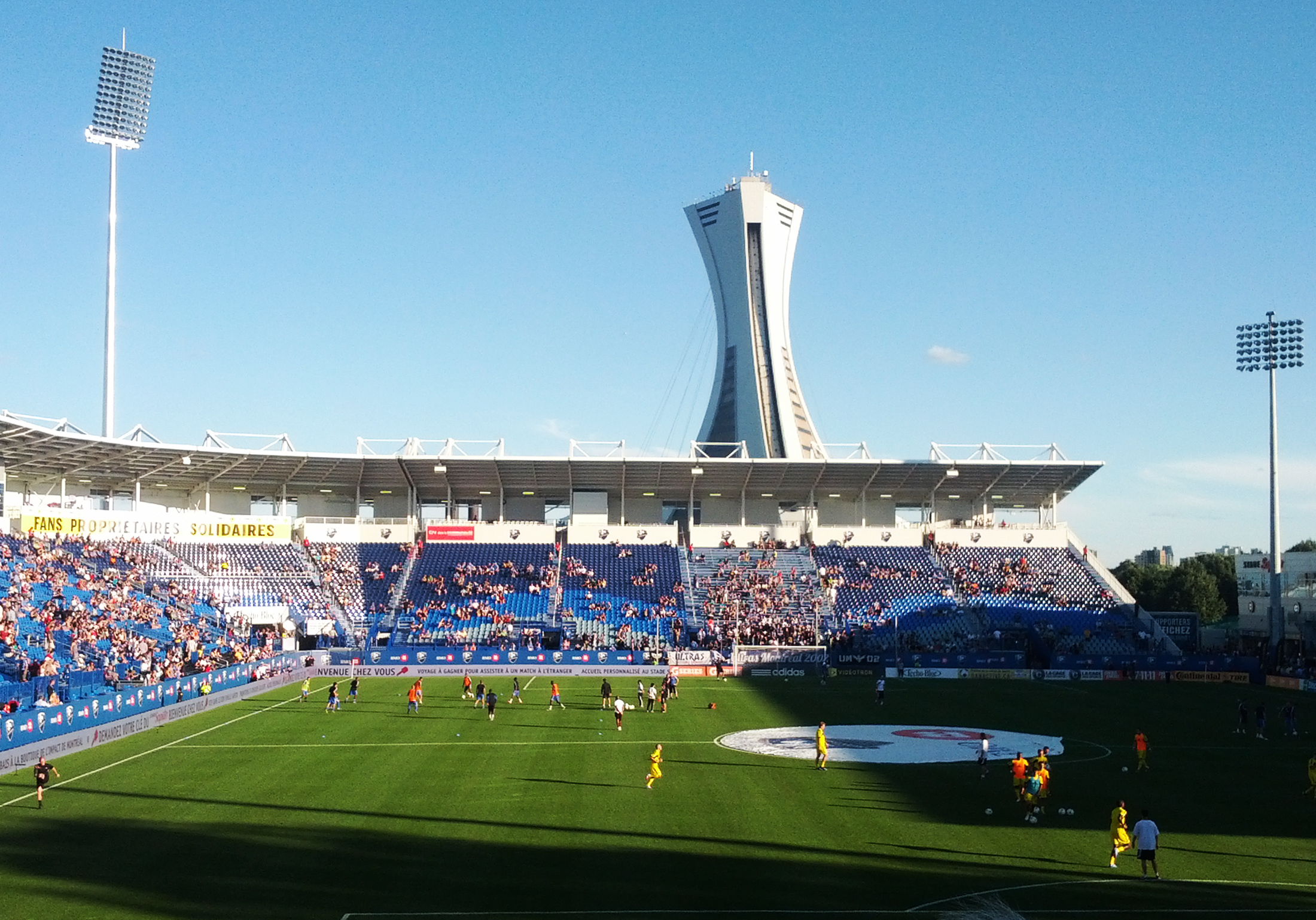
Stadium in July 2012 after expansion

== See also ==
- List of soccer stadiums in Canada
- List of Major League Soccer stadiums
- List of Canadian Premier League stadiums
- Lists of stadiums

Preceded by Complexe sportif Claude-Robillard; 1993–2007	Home of the Montreal Impact; 2008–2011	Succeeded by current (in MLS)
Preceded by Olympic Stadium; 2012	Home of the CF Montréal; 2012–present	Succeeded by current
Preceded by Workers' Stadium; 2014	Trophée des Champions venue 2015	Succeeded by Wörthersee Stadion; 2016
