= Nippert Stadium =

Football stadium at the University of Cincinnati

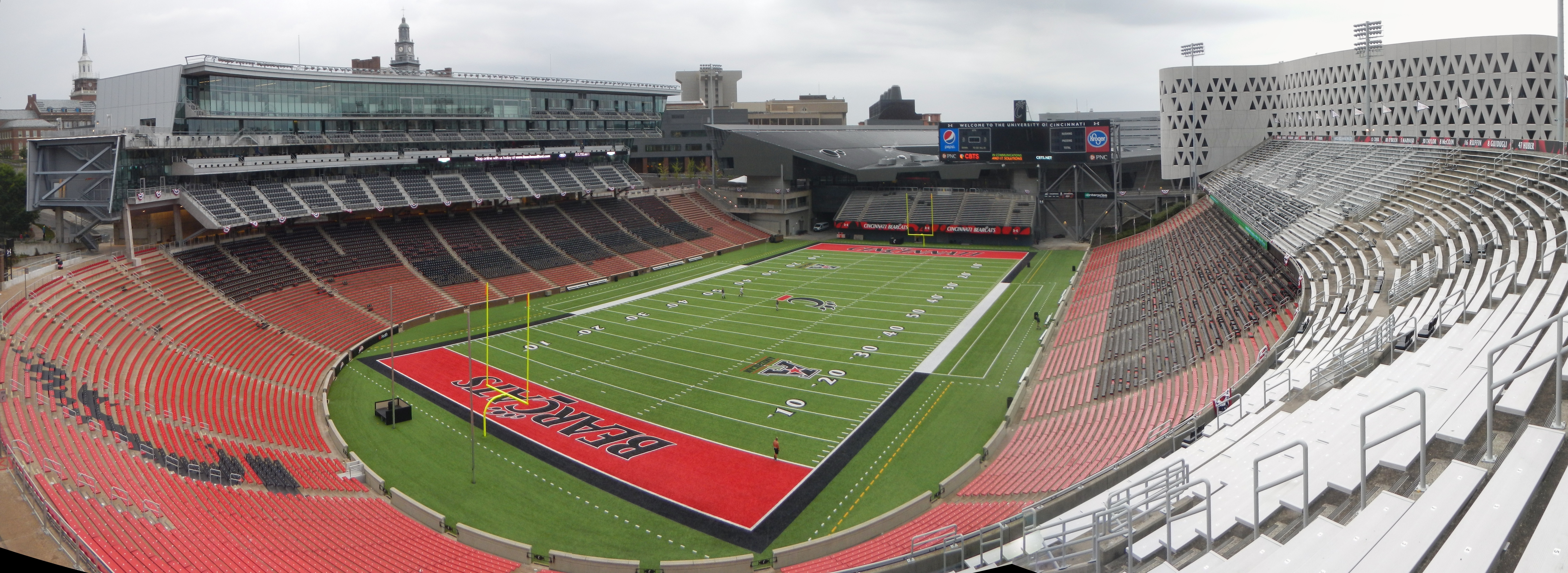
- View from south corner in September 2015
- Interactive map of Nippert Stadium
- Full name: James Gamble Nippert Memorial Stadium
- Former names: Carson Field (1901–1924)
- Location: 2700 Bearcats Way (174 West Corry Street); Cincinnati, Ohio, U.S.
- Coordinates: 39.1312°N 84.5162°W
- Owner: University of Cincinnati
- Operator: University of Cincinnati
- Capacity: 38,088 (2024–present) Former capacity: List: 12,000 (1924–1935); 24,000 (1936–1953); 28,000 (1954–1991); 35,000 (1992–2014); 40,000 (2014–2015); 40,124 (2015–2023)
- Surface: Motz artificial turf (2019–present) Formerly: List: Natural grass (1901–1969); Astroturf (1970–1999); Field Turf (2000–2012); Act Global UBU Sports Speed M6-M (2013–2018)
- Record attendance: 40,124 (October 24, 2015)

Construction
- Groundbreaking: 1915
- Opened: 1915; 111 years ago (dedicated September 27, 1924)
- Renovated: 1936, 1954, 1970, 1990–1992, 2000, 2005, 2013–2015, 2017
- Cost: US$10.5 million ($197 million in 2025)
- Architect: Frederick W. Garber

Tenants
- Cincinnati Bearcats (NCAA) 1915–1989, 1991–2013, 2015–present; Cincinnati Bengals (AFL) 1968–1969; FC Cincinnati (USLC/MLS) 2016–2020

Website
- gobearcats.com/nippert-stadium

James Gamble Nippert Memorial Stadium is an outdoor stadium in Cincinnati, Ohio, located on the campus of University of Cincinnati. Primarily used for American football, it has been home to the Cincinnati Bearcats of the Big 12 Conference in rudimentary form since 1901 and as a permanent concrete stadium since 1915, making it the fourth-oldest playing site and fifth-oldest stadium in college football, respectively.

The stadium has also been used as a soccer venue, serving as the home of FC Cincinnati of Major League Soccer from their inaugural 2016 USL season through the 2020 MLS season, following which they moved to TQL Stadium. Nippert Stadium has a current seating capacity of 40,124 following the expansion and renovation performed in 2014, and the 2017 removal of corner seats to accommodate FC Cincinnati during their transition to the MLS.

== Namesake ==
During the final game of the 1923 season with intrastate rival Miami University, UC player James Gamble "Jimmy" Nippert sustained a spike wound injury. He died a month later of blood poisoning, reportedly due to having been infected by droppings left after a pre-game chicken race. Nippert's grandfather, James N. Gamble of Procter & Gamble, donated the required funds to complete the stadium. A locker room and training (medical) facility was added as part of the renovation for the safety of players. Nippert's brother, Louis, was majority owner of the Cincinnati Reds during the 1970s.

== Early history ==
In 1895, the organizer of UC's first football team, Arch Carson, introduced a plan to build a stadium complete with wooden bleachers on the site where Nippert Stadium currently stands. The plans became a reality in 1901 while Carson was serving as UC's physical education director. The first game played on the site originally called Varsity Field in Burnet Woods was on November 2, 1901, vs the Ohio University Bobcats. Cincinnati was defeated 16–0 in that contest. They rebounded a week later and defeated Hannover on Varsity field November 9, 1901, 10–0. Although Cincinnati has played home contests in other Cincinnati parks, this site has been the primary home of Cincinnati football since that time. The playing surface at Nippert Stadium is called Carson Field in honor of Arch Carson. Construction of Carson Field began in 1900 and was completed in 1910.

In 1915, construction was completed on the first sections of a brick and concrete structure to replace the wooden stands and continued for several seasons as funds were raised. In 1924, the completed structure was dedicated as James Gamble Nippert Memorial Stadium with a capacity of 12,000.

The field is slightly offset from a conventional north–south alignment, configured north-northeast to south-southwest at an approximate elevation of 800 feet (245 m) above sea level.

== Timeline ==
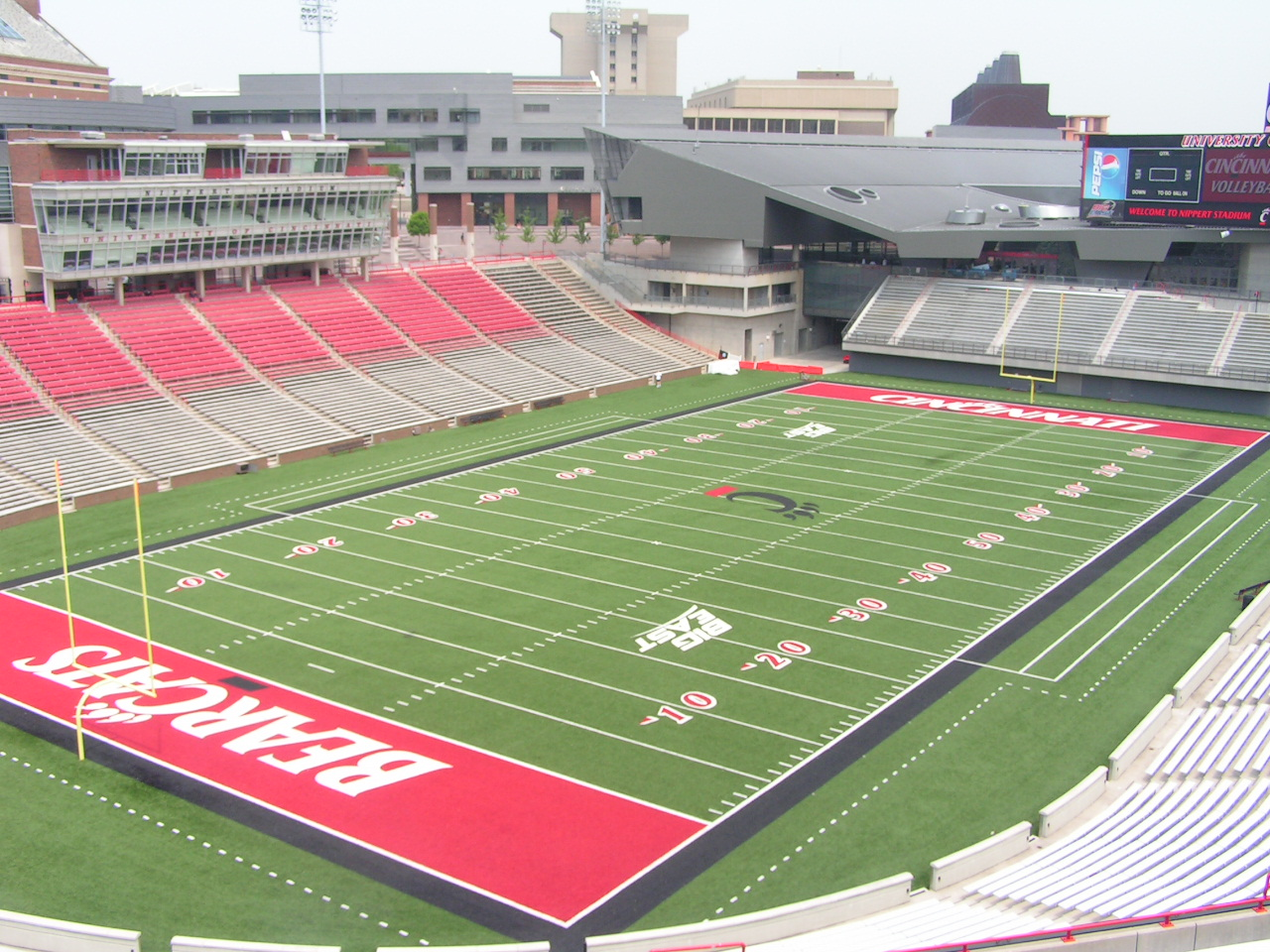
Interior view in 2006

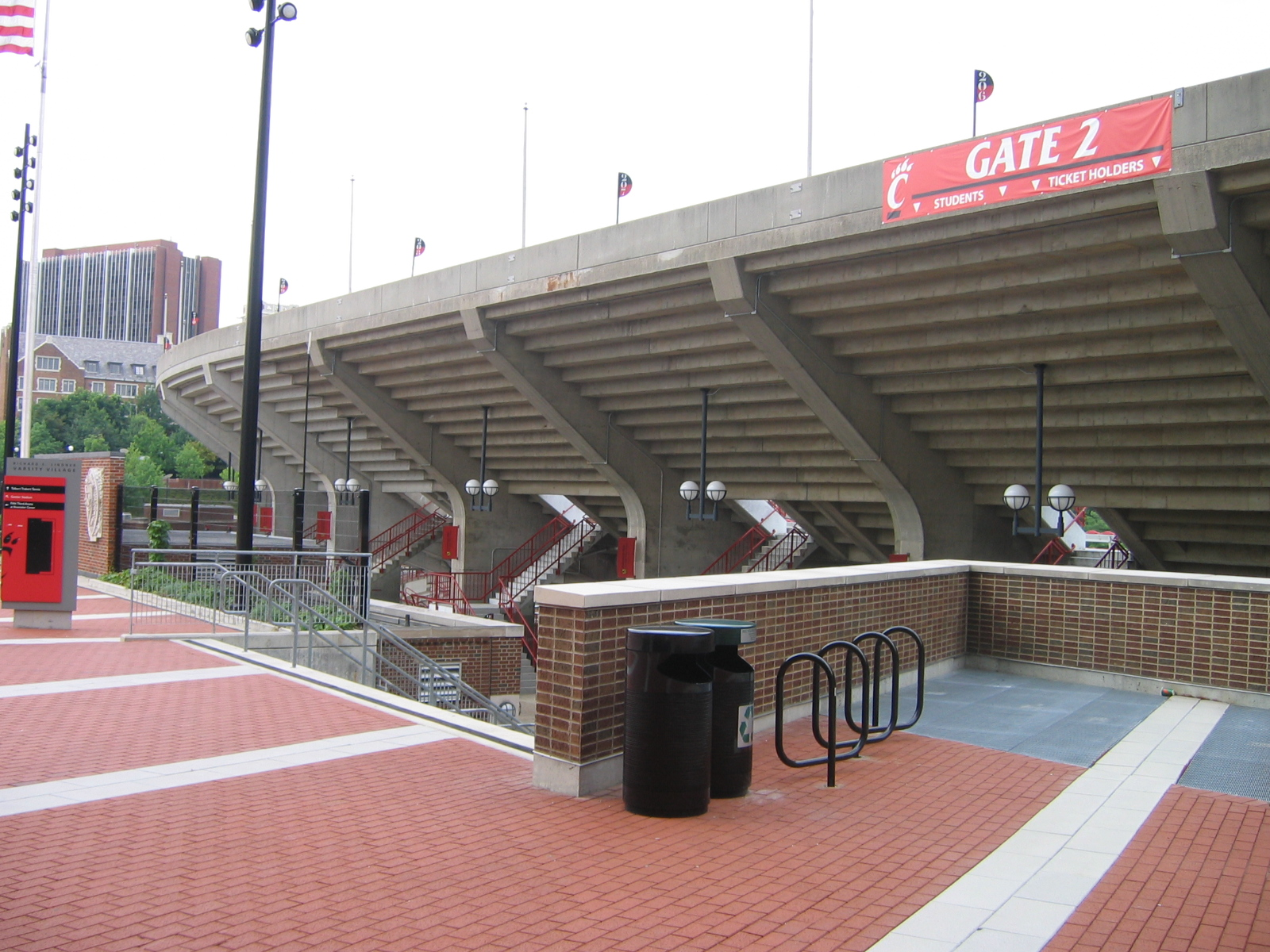
Grandstands from the exterior, 2008

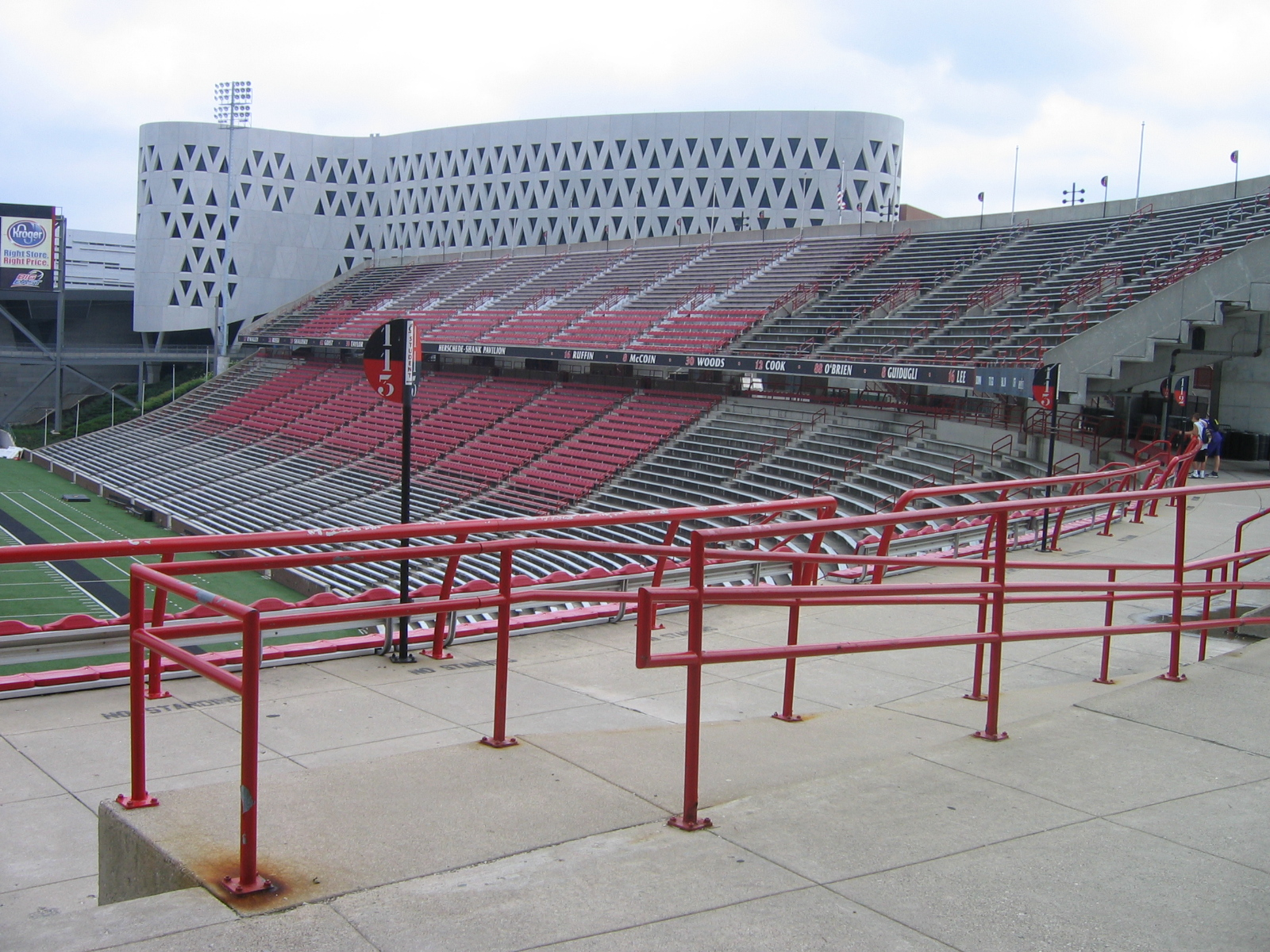
East Stands 2008

- 1895 – UC physical education director Arch Carson introduced a plan to build a stadium in Burnet Woods.
- 1901 – Cincinnati played its first game on Carson Field. Wood bleachers were built on the surrounding hillside.
- 1909 – Lights were first used because the large number of co-op students on the team could practice only at night.
- 1915 – Construction began on a permanent brick-and-concrete structure.
- 1923 – James Gamble donated $250,000 in memory of his grandson, Jimmy Nippert, to complete the stadium. Jimmy died on Christmas 1923 from a football injury a month prior.
- 1924 – The completed James Gamble Nippert Stadium was dedicated on November 8, with a seating capacity of 12,000.
- 1936 – Carson Field was lowered 12 feet (3.7 m) to allow the capacity to expand to 24,000.
- 1954 – Reed Shank Pavilion was completed along the east sideline to boost the capacity to 28,000.
- 1968 – Nippert was the first home of the AFL's expansion Cincinnati Bengals while the city constructed Riverfront Stadium, which opened in 1970.
- 1970 – AstroTurf replaced the natural grass surface.
- 1989 – Nippert Stadium was closed for renovation and UC played its home games in 1990 at Riverfront Stadium.
- 1991 – Phase I of the stadium renovation was completed to allow for UC home games to be played. The structure was fortified and a three-tiered press box was added.
- 1992 – Phase II of the renovation was completed, increasing the seating capacity to 35,000 through the expansion of the (renamed) Herschede-Shank Pavilion, and adding new lighting and a scoreboard.
- 2000 – FieldTurf, a revolutionary new grass-like artificial surface, was installed. The former press box was renamed the John and Dorothy Hermanies Press Box.
- 2001 – A new video scoreboard was added in the north end zone and 10,000 seats were upgraded.
- 2005 – A permanent grandstand upgraded seating behind the north end zone and provided new locker rooms at field level for game use. A new, larger video board was installed and the FieldTurf playing surface was replaced.
- 2009 – 9,000 black cushioned seats were installed in the UCATS seating areas of the stadium, replacing the previously installed red plastic seating covers.
- 2013 – FieldTurf playing surface replaced with Act Global UBU and at the end of the 2013–2014 season with, Nippert closed for renovation.
- 2014 – UC plays home games at Paul Brown Stadium, home of the Cincinnati Bengals, during stadium renovations.
- 2015 – Capacity is increased to 40,000 with the addition of premium seating, new pavilion, additional restrooms, upgraded concessions and improved concourses.
- 2016 – New Turf, renovation of visitors locker room
- 2017 – Playing surface expanded from 110 yards by 70 yards to 115 yards by 75 yards for soccer and player safety, resulting in the loss of approximately 2,000 seats. The $2M project was paid for by FC Cincinnati. New Videoboard. The project was made possible by a gift from longtime UC supporters Carl and Martha Lindner. Longtime multimedia rights holder IMG College also contributed to the project.
- 2021 – When FC Cincinnati left for TQL Stadium, new turf was installed in Nippert Stadium.
- 2022 – Additional field level suites installed.

== Renovation history ==
The field was lowered in 1936, allowing capacity to reach 24,000. In 1954, a small upper deck on the East sideline was completed, and named the Reed Shank Pavilion. This increased capacity to 28,000.

In 1992, the stadium was heavily renovated, expanding the upper deck on the East sideline and adding a new Press Box on the West sideline. This increased capacity to 35,097.

In 2005, new gameday locker rooms behind the north end zone (underneath the newly completed Campus Rec Center) were added, as well as a new bigger video board above the north end zone.

=== 2014–2015 renovation and expansion ===
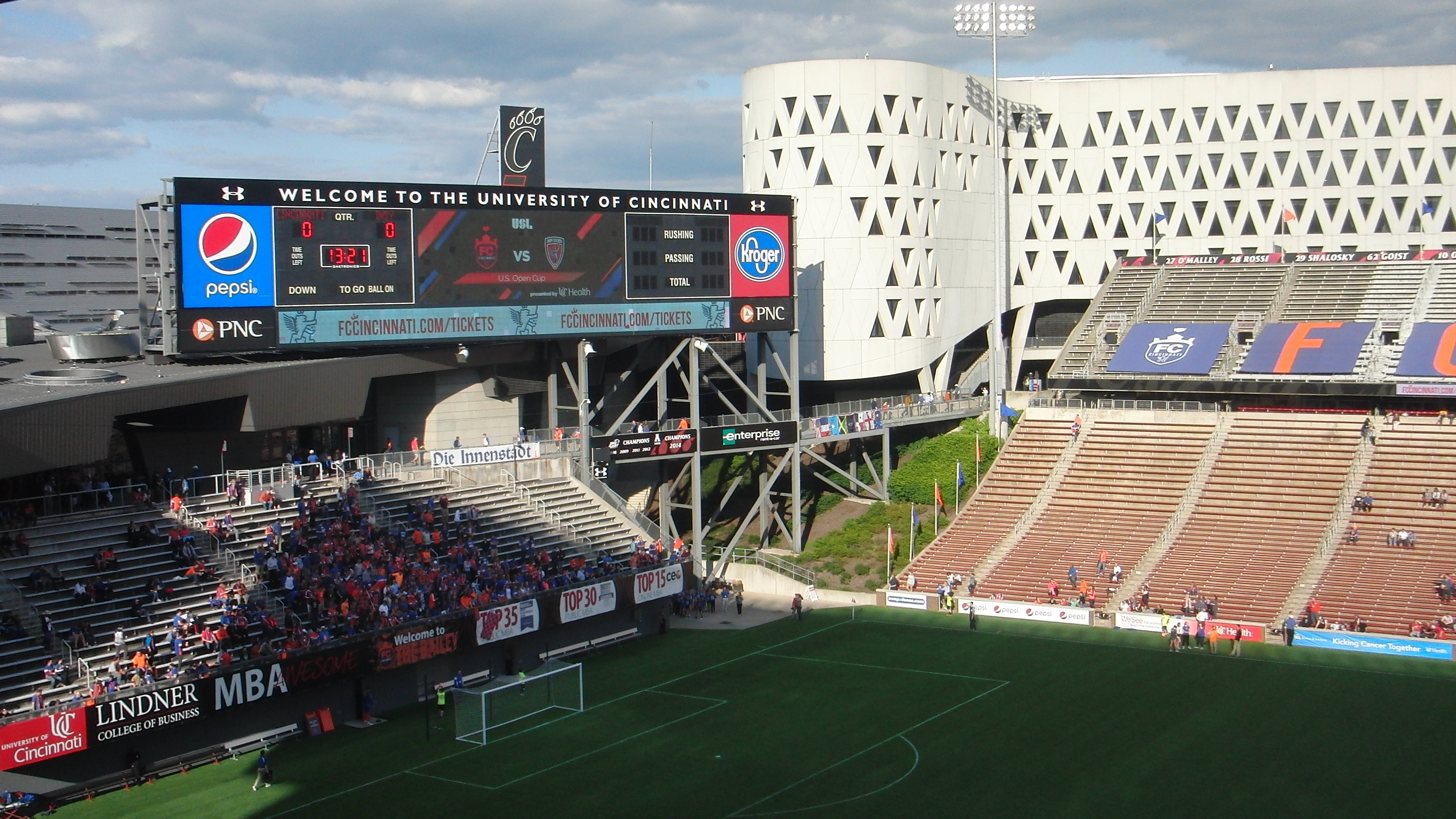
Scoreboard during a soccer game in 2016

As the UC program rose to prominence in the late 2000s, the small seating capacity of Nippert became an issue. Former UC head coach Brian Kelly called for an expansion of Nippert, the smallest stadium in the Big East Conference. On December 18, 2012, President Santa J. Ono and then Athletic Director Whit Babcock unveiled the long-anticipated plans to update and expand Nippert Stadium. Originally the price tag was estimated at $70 million, but eventually an increased budget of $86 million was announced. On June 25, 2013, the University of Cincinnati Board of Trustees approved the Nippert Stadium Expansion. The West Pavilion now includes a new press box and premium seating area, which will add suites, loge boxes, and club seating. The western concourse also boasts improved general fan amenities, including concession stands, restrooms, and more efficient in-stadium traffic flow. Additions on the east side of the stadium were more sparse, but included additional concession stands, restrooms, and an expansion of the formerly-cramped concourse walkways, due to the addition of skywalks to connect the Herschede-Shank Pavilion with the O'Varsity Way brick plaza, which is located just outside the stadium.

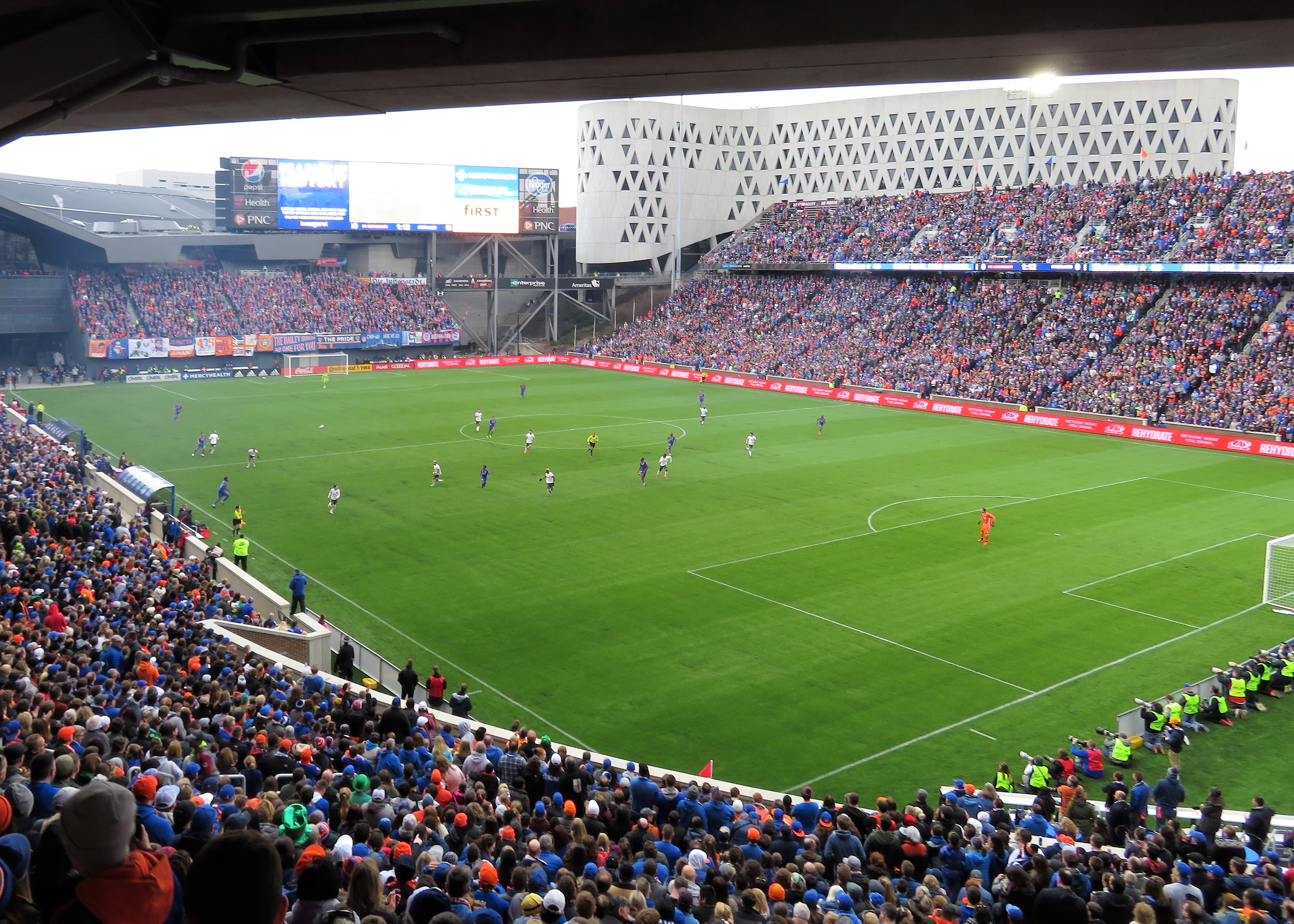
FC Cincinnati v Portland Timbers, 2019

After renovations, Nippert's capacity (including about 2500 SRO) is now around 40,000 (an exact figure hasn't yet been put forth by the university). However, local United Soccer League club FC Cincinnati sold out Nippert Stadium in July 2016 after the renovations, and announced a crowd of 35,061. Further, in early 2017 Nippert lost 2,200 seats in a $2 million project expanding the playing field 5 yards in both length and width to accommodate a full-sized soccer field.

The 2014–15 renovation and expansion was designed by the New York-based firm, Architecture Research Office in close collaboration with Heery International. ARO served as the design architect, while Heery served as the sports consultant and executive architect. Construction on the Nippert Stadium expansion started in December 2013, and was completed on time, in September 2015. During the 2014 season, the Bearcats played all of their home games at Paul Brown Stadium, the downtown home of the Cincinnati Bengals.

== Attendance ==
=== Record attendance ===
On October 24, 2015, the Bearcats hosted the UConn Huskies on Homecoming weekend. The crowd on hand was 40,124 making this the second consecutive official sellout in the newly renovated Nippert Stadium.

=== Largest football attendance (since 2000) ===
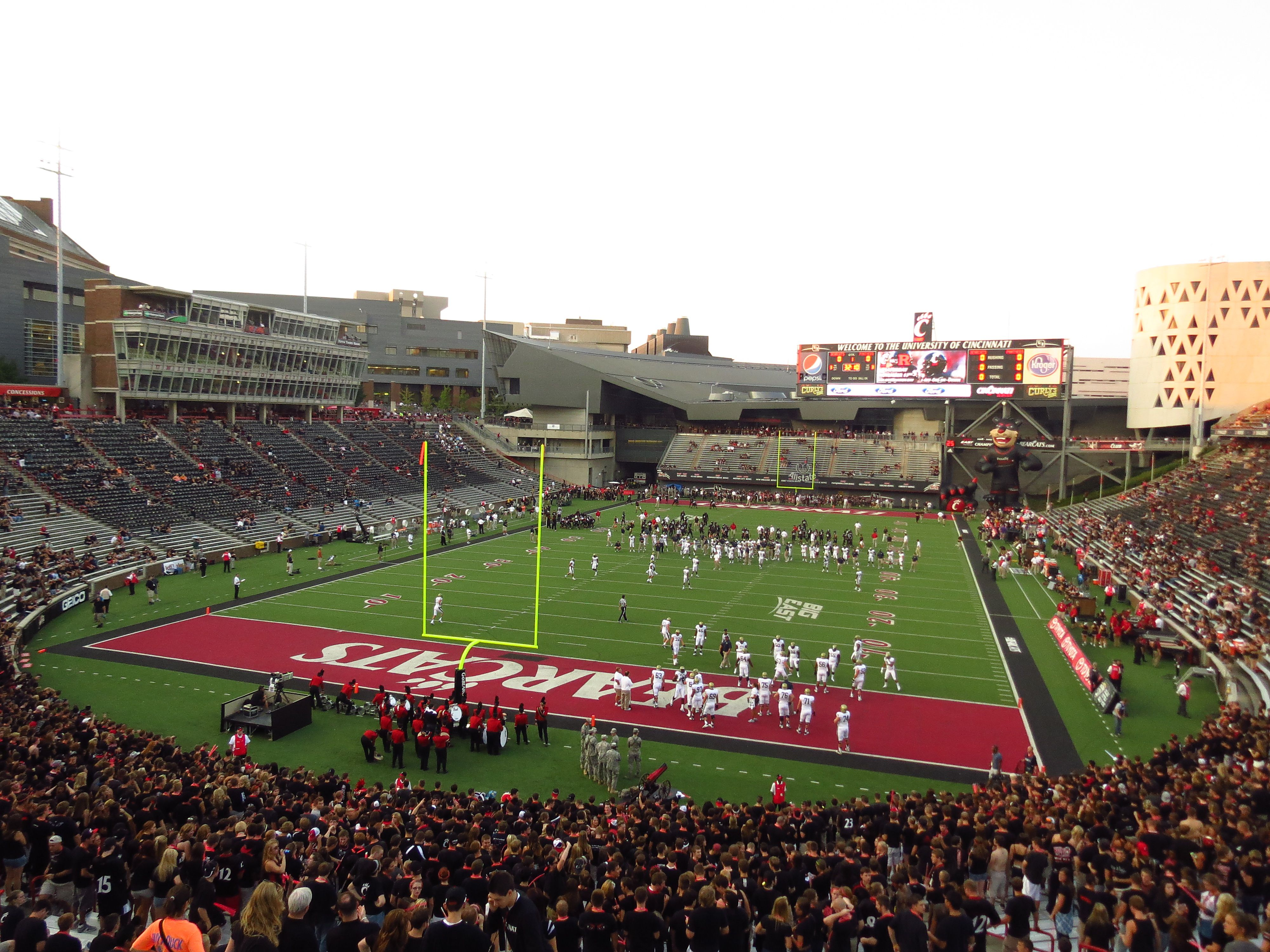
Cincinnati Bearcats football game at Nippert in 2012

| Rank | Date | Attendance | Result |
|---|---|---|---|
| 1 | October 24, 2015 | 40,124 | Cincinnati 37 – Connecticut 13 |
| 2 | October 4, 2019 | 40,121 | Cincinnati 27 – #18 UCF 24 |
| 3 | October 1, 2015 | 40,101 | Cincinnati 34 – Miami (FL) 23 |
| 4 | September 15, 2016 | 40,015 | Cincinnati 16 – #6 Houston 40 |
| 5 | September 5, 2015 | 39,095 | Cincinnati 52 – Alabama A&M 10 |
| 6 | November 9, 2019 | 38,919 | Cincinnati 48 – Connecticut 3 |
| 7 | September 24, 2022 | 38,464 | Cincinnati 45 – Indiana 24 |
| T8 | September 24, 2016 | 38,112 | Cincinnati 27 – Miami (OH) 20 |
| T8 | September 12, 2015 | 38,112 | Cincinnati 26 – Temple 34 |
| T10 | September 10, 2022 | 38,088 | Cincinnati 63 – Kennesaw State 10 |
| T10 | October 24, 2026 | 38,088 | Cincinnati 37 – #8 Texas Tech 24 |

=== Soccer attendance ===
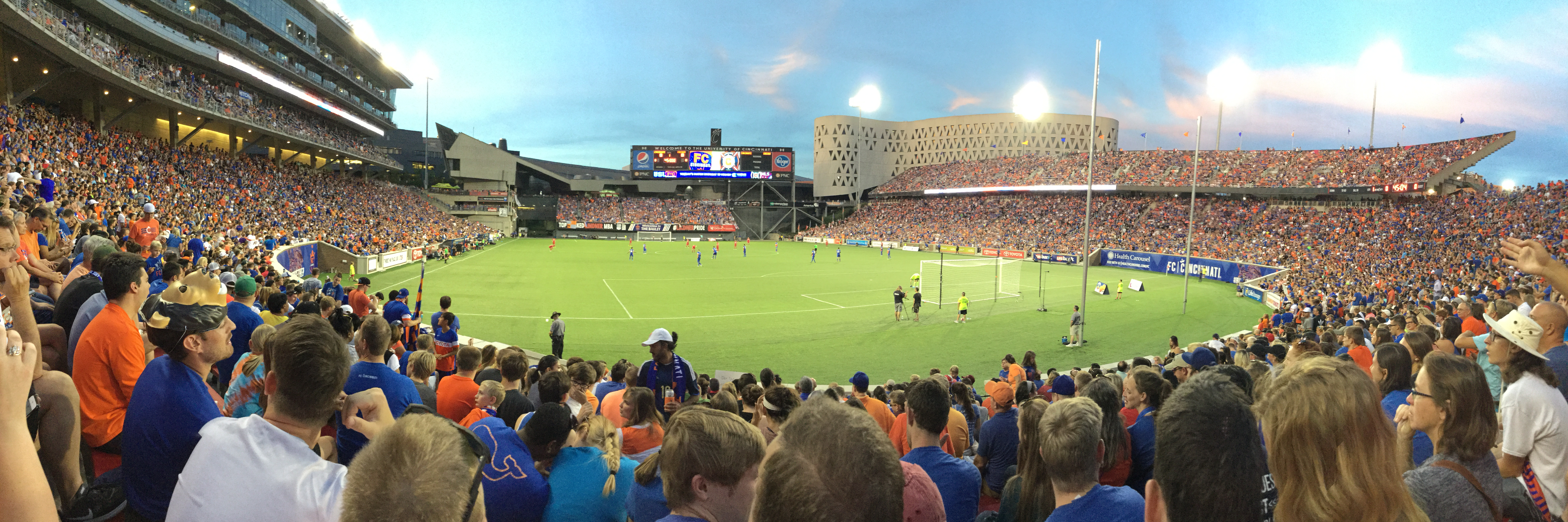
Nippert hosting the FC Cincinnati v Chicago Fire soccer match on 28 June 2017, after the field expansion

During FC Cincinnati soccer matches, stadium capacity was limited to 35,061 before 2017 when the field was widened and rows were removed along the sidelines and in the corners to accommodate a regulation width soccer field. Nippert sold out once for a soccer match before the field was widened, when English Premier League club Crystal Palace FC played a friendly against FC Cincinnati on July 16, 2016. Current soccer capacity after rows were removed and once the club reached MLS is 32,250.

| League | Season | Average attendance |
|---|---|---|
| USL | 2016 | 17,296 |
| USL | 2017 | 21,199 |
| USL | 2018 | 25,717 |
| MLS | 2019 | 27,336 |

=== Largest soccer attendance (pre-MLS) ===
| Rank | Date | Attendance | Opponent | Win/Loss/Draw | Notes |
|---|---|---|---|---|---|
| 1 | July 16, 2016 | 35,061 | Crystal Palace FC | L | International Friendly |
| 2 | August 15, 2017 | 33,250 | New York Red Bulls | L | U.S. Open Cup |
| 3 | June 28, 2017 | 32,287 | Chicago Fire | W | U.S. Open Cup |
| 4 | September 29, 2018 | 31,478 | Indy Eleven | W | Final FCC regular-season home game before MLS move |
| 5 | September 16, 2017 | 30,417 | New York Red Bulls II | W | |
| 6 | October 2, 2016 | 30,187 | Charleston Battery | L | USL Playoffs |
| 7 | June 14, 2017 | 30,160 | Columbus Crew | W | U.S. Open Cup |
| 8 | June 16, 2018 | 28,026 | Richmond Kickers | W | |
| 9 | August 4, 2018 | 27,426 | Nashville SC | D | |
| 10 | September 16, 2018 | 27,275 | Toronto FC II | W | |

=== Largest soccer attendance (MLS) ===
| Rank | Date | Attendance | Opponent | Win/Loss/Draw | Notes |
|---|---|---|---|---|---|
| 1 | March 17, 2019 | 32,250 | Portland Timbers | W | Inaugural Home Match |
| 1 | June 22, 2019 | 32,250 | LA Galaxy | L | |
| 3 | August 25, 2019 | 30,611 | Columbus Crew | L | Hell Is Real Derby |
| 4 | July 18, 2019 | 28,774 | D.C. United | L | |
| 5 | May 25, 2019 | 28,290 | New York Red Bulls | L | |
| 6 | August 17, 2019 | 27,273 | New York City FC | L | |
| 7 | August 3, 2019 | 27,106 | Vancouver Whitecaps | L | |
| 8 | September 21, 2019 | 26,466 | Chicago Fire | D | |
| 9 | April 19, 2019 | 26,416 | Real Salt Lake | L | |
| 10 | July 6, 2019 | 26,276 | Houston Dynamo | W | |

=== Other soccer attendance ===
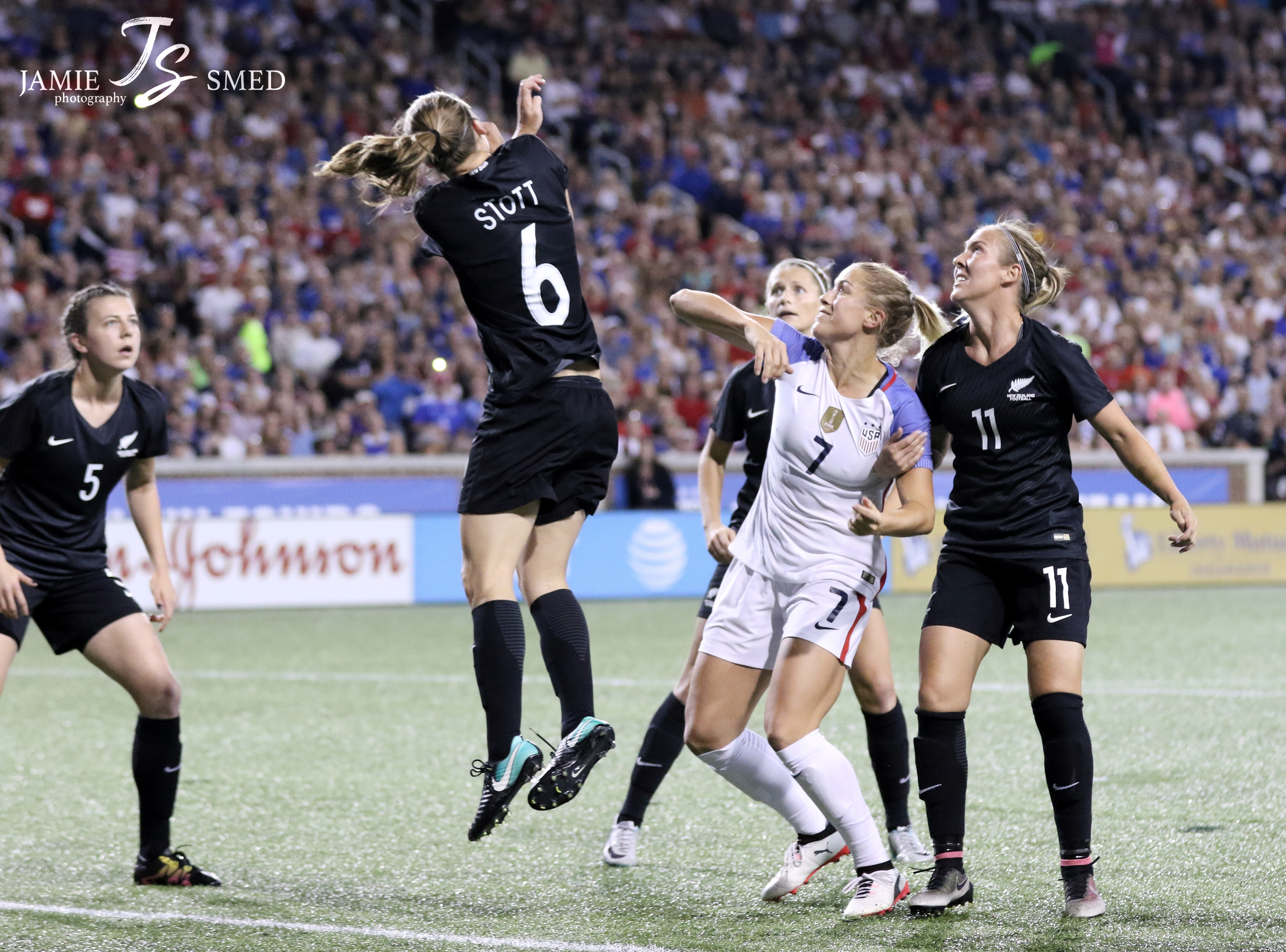
United States v New Zealand women's soccer, played in September 2017 in front of 30,596 spectators

On September 15, 2017, the United States women's soccer team hosted New Zealand in a friendly before 30,596 fans – a record for the women's national team in the state of Ohio.

On June 9, 2019, the United States men's soccer team hosted Venezuela in a friendly to prepare for the 2019 CONCACAF Gold Cup.

| Date | Winning Team | Result | Losing Team | Tournament | Spectators |
|---|---|---|---|---|---|
| September 15, 2017 | United States women | 5–0 | New Zealand women | Women’s International Friendly | 30,596 |
| June 9, 2019 | Venezuela | 3–0 | United States | International Friendly | 23,955 |

== Reception ==
Nippert has earned a reputation as a tough place to play. One national columnist, visiting the sold-out Keg of Nails rivalry game in 2013, described Nippert Stadium as a "quaint bowl of angry noise sitting under the gaze of remarkable architecture" and went on to compare it to a "baby Death Valley" (referring to LSU's notoriously intimidating Tiger Stadium). In 2012, USA Today called Nippert Stadium the best football venue in what was then the Big East Conference.

== Other tenants and events hosted ==
The stadium served as home for the American Football League expansion team, the Cincinnati Bengals, in 1968 and 1969, while their eventual permanent home at Riverfront Stadium was being constructed.

The Cincinnati Comets of the American Soccer League played at Nippert in 1973.

The stadium has served as a concert venue at least three times. On July 22, 1973, a show headlined by The Edgar Winter Group with The James Gang and Peter Frampton's group, Frampton's Camel, drew between 5,000 and 7,000 fans. On July 29, 1973, a concert with Grand Funk Railroad drew 8,000 fans; seventeen were arrested on charges they got in without a ticket. On August 3, 1975, Nippert hosted The Ohio River Rock Festival (Aerosmith, Black Oak Arkansas, Blue Öyster Cult, Foghat, Mahogany Rush, Nitty Gritty Dirt Band, REO Speedwagon, and Styx; admission was festival seating/general admission, attendance 32,000 est. according to local radio broadcasts). In addition, the Grateful Dead was supposed to perform at Nippert on June 15, 1973, but the show was canceled, according to the Cincinnati Post, due to the fact that the staging was not up to the Dead's demands (they eventually played Cincinnati Gardens on December 4, 1973.)

On November 2, 2008, Democratic presidential candidate Barack Obama held a rally at Nippert two days before the election to an estimated 27,000 attendees.

FC Cincinnati began playing at Nippert in 2016. The team broke the United Soccer League regular-season record for attendance five times, drawing 30,417 fans to its game against New York Red Bulls II on September 16, 2017. They drew 30,187 to their playoff game against the Charleston Battery on October 2, 2016. On September 29, 2018, they once again broke the USL attendance record, drawing 31,478 fans against Indy Eleven in FCC's final regular-season home game before the team's move to MLS. The team drew 35,061 for a friendly against Crystal Palace F.C. on July 16, 2016. They drew a USL record home opener crowd of 23,144 against Saint Louis FC on April 15, 2017. They drew 33,250 to a U.S. Open Cup semifinal against New York Red Bulls on August 15, 2017.

Nitro Circus performed at Nippert on June 23, 2018.

=== Alternative stadiums ===
UC has used Paycor Stadium, home of the NFL's Cincinnati Bengals, as an alternate home field for several high-profile home games. The downtown stadium has a larger seating capacity of 65,535. Games against Ohio State (2002), Oklahoma (2010), and West Virginia (2011) drew crowds of 66,319, 58,253, and 48,152, respectively, at Paycor Stadium.

== See also ==
- List of NCAA Division I FBS football stadiums
- List of American football stadiums by capacity
- Lists of stadiums

Events and tenants
| Preceded by Union Ball Park | Home of the Cincinnati Bearcats; 1901 – present | Succeeded by current |
| Preceded by First Stadium | Home of Cincinnati Bengals; 1968 – 1969 | Succeeded by Riverfront Stadium |
| Preceded by First Stadium | Home of FC Cincinnati; 2016 – 2020 | Succeeded by TQL Stadium |
