= Santa Barbara Sky FC =

American professional soccer club based in Santa Barbara

- Founded: July 12, 2022; 4 years ago
- Ground: Harder Stadium
- Capacity: 17,000
- Owner: Peter Moore
- League: USL Championship
- Website: santabarbaraskyfc.com

Santa Barbara Sky FC is a planned American professional soccer team based in Santa Barbara, California. First announced in 2022, the team plans to play in USL Championship, though it has backed out each season, and does not currently plan on fielding a team in the 2027 season. The team had originally been slated to play in USL League One beginning in 2025.

== History ==
On July 12, 2022, the United Soccer League announced that Peter Moore had been granted a USL League One expansion team in Santa Barbara, to start play in the 2024 season. Before the 2024 season could kick off, however, the team announced that they would begin play in 2025 instead.

On June 18, 2024, the Sky announced they had signed a multi-year contract to play at Harder Stadium.

On November 13, 2024, the United Soccer League announced that the USL Championship franchise rights held by Memphis 901 FC had been transferred to Santa Barbara Sky FC. The Sky would begin play in the USL Championship in 2026, opting to skip USL League One entirely.

On August 28, 2026, an Instagram post was put up by the official team account stating that there would not be any team fielded in the 2027 season as previously stated in their 2025 article on their team website titled Inaugural Season Update. On September 7, the team revealed that they couldn't get a lease to Harder Stadium. And the team is now looking for new ownership to revive the project to hopefully go forward.

== Colors and badge ==
The club's official colors are terracotta and navy blue, representing the "local Spanish-style terracotta rooftops against the backdrop of a deep blue sky." The crest depicts Saint Barbara, the city's namesake.
