= Act Global =

Action

- Headquarters: Austin, Texas, United States
- Area served: International
- Key people: John Baize, CEO, Co-founder; Chris Clapham, Co-founder
- Products: artificial turf
- Website: www.actglobal.com

Act Global is an artificial turf manufacturer based in Austin, Texas. Its primary U.S. production facility was in Calhoun, Georgia, where plant assets were put up for auction in late 2025. The company is best known for its brands in sports, Xtreme Turf and UBU. FIFA has certified the company as a "FIFA Quality Licensee" for football turf.

== History ==
John Baize and Chris Clapham co-founded Act Global in 2004 to be a socially and environmentally responsible turf manufacturer. Since its inception, Act Global has spread worldwide with multiple manufacturing centers across the globe. Baize has served on the industry Synthetic Turf Council board of directors for nine years including as Chair. Baize also is the initial Chair of the global Synthetic Turf Council International.

In 2009, FIFA certified Act Global as a "preferred producer" for football turf.

In 2015, the company moved to its current U.S. production facility in Georgia.

In 2016, Act Global acquired the UBU and Turfscape brands.

In 2018, Act Global won the inaugural Synthetic Turf Council Philanthropy Award to recognize its charitable contributions and social outreach to communities. The company repeated this distinction in 2020 when it was again issued the STC Philanthropy Award.

In 2020 and 2021, Act Global won the Synthetic Turf Council Sustainability Award to recognize the STC member organization that consistently, and through innovation, utilizes sustainable materials and processes.

Beginning with the 2015 tournament in Amsterdam, Act Global has supplied synthetic turf pitches to the Homeless World Cup, and it continued to do so at later editions, including Oslo and Seoul in 2024. In 2016 the tournament was held in Glasgow, and the company was again the official turf sponsor.

In March 2024, the company marked its 20th anniversary, stating that it had completed installations in more than 90 countries.

In November 2025, the liquidation firm Tiger Group announced an online auction of machinery, vehicles and inventory from the 210,000-square-foot Calhoun, Georgia plant of ACT Global Americas, Inc. The sale was described as a plant-closing sale conducted as an assignment for the benefit of creditors.

== Products ==
The company offers various kinds of artificial turfs, depending upon the use.

- Sports turf: The Xtreme Turf and UBU lines are intended for sports use, with different offerings for various sports and uses including football, soccer, baseball, field hockey, rugby, lacrosse, marching bands, cheer and multi-purpose events.
- Aviation turf: AvTurf is a patented system used for airport ground cover to minimize foreign debris, replace the natural habitat for birds and wildlife near runway safety areas and provide visual recognition and operational benefits. AvTurf is listed in the United States Federal Aviation Administration circular for Airside applications.
- Landfill closure: LiteEarth is a patented system used in the closure of landfills and land reclamation.
- Landscape turf: Turfscape is available for both residential and commercial spaces. This market sector focuses on maximizing land space and improving aesthetics and property values while saving water and lower maintenance burdens.
