= List of U.S. stadiums by capacity =

The following is a list of stadiums in the United States. They are ranked by capacity, which is the maximum number of spectators the stadium can normally accommodate. All U.S. stadiums with a current capacity of 10,000 or more are included in the list. The majority of these stadiums are used for American football, either in college football or the National Football League (NFL). Most of the others are Major League Baseball (MLB) ballparks or Major League Soccer (MLS) stadiums.

- Rows shaded in yellow indicates stadium is home to an NFL, MLB, MLS, or National Women's Soccer League franchise. Stadiums with an asterisk at the end denote an indoor stadium.

#	Image	Stadium	Capacity	City	State	Opened	Type	Tenant	Ref.
1		Michigan Stadium	107,601	Ann Arbor	Michigan	1927	Football	Michigan Wolverines (NCAA)	
2		Beaver Stadium	106,572	University Park	Pennsylvania	1960	Football	Penn State Nittany Lions (NCAA)	
3		Ohio Stadium	102,780	Columbus	Ohio	1922	Football	Ohio State Buckeyes (NCAA)	
4		Kyle Field	102,733	College Station	Texas	1927	Football	Texas A&M Aggies (NCAA)	
5		Tiger Stadium	102,321	Baton Rouge	Louisiana	1924	Football	LSU Tigers (NCAA)	
6		Neyland Stadium	101,915	Knoxville	Tennessee	1921	Football	Tennessee Volunteers (NCAA)	
7		Darrell K Royal–Texas Memorial Stadium	100,119	Austin	Texas	1924	Football	Texas Longhorns (NCAA)	
8		Bryant–Denny Stadium	100,077	Tuscaloosa	Alabama	1929	Football	Alabama Crimson Tide (NCAA)	
9		Sanford Stadium	93,033	Athens	Georgia	1929	Football	Georgia Bulldogs (NCAA)	
10		Cotton Bowl	92,100	Dallas	Texas	1930	Football, soccer	Red River Rivalry (NCAA); State Fair Classic (NCAA); Atlético Dallas, Dallas Trinity FC	
11		Rose Bowl	89,702	Pasadena	California	1922	Football	UCLA Bruins (NCAA); Rose Bowl Game (NCAA)	
12		Ben Hill Griffin Stadium	88,548	Gainesville	Florida	1930	Football	Florida Gators (NCAA)	
13		Jordan-Hare Stadium	88,043	Auburn	Alabama	1939	Football	Auburn Tigers (NCAA)	
14		Memorial Stadium	85,458	Lincoln	Nebraska	1923	Football	Nebraska Cornhuskers (NCAA)	
15		MetLife Stadium	82,500	East Rutherford	New Jersey	2010	Football	New York Giants (NFL); New York Jets (NFL)	
16		Memorial Stadium	81,500	Clemson	South Carolina	1942	Football	Clemson Tigers (NCAA)	
17		Lambeau Field	81,441	Green Bay	Wisconsin	1957	Football	Green Bay Packers (NFL)	
18		Notre Dame Stadium	80,795	Notre Dame	Indiana	1930	Football	Notre Dame Fighting Irish (NCAA) |	
19		Gaylord Family Oklahoma Memorial Stadium	80,126	Norman	Oklahoma	1925	Football	Oklahoma Sooners (NCAA)	
20		AT&T Stadium*	80,000	Arlington	Texas	2009	Football	Dallas Cowboys (NFL); Cotton Bowl Classic (NCAA); Big 12 Championship Game (NCAA)	
21		Williams–Brice Stadium	77,559	Columbia	South Carolina	1934	Football	South Carolina Gamecocks (NCAA)	
22		Los Angeles Memorial Coliseum	77,500	Los Angeles	California	1923	Football, Track and Field	USC Trojans (NCAA)	
23		GEHA Field at Arrowhead Stadium	76,416	Kansas City	Missouri	1972	Football	Kansas City Chiefs (NFL)	
24		Donald W. Reynolds Razorback Stadium	76,212	Fayetteville	Arkansas	1938	Football	Arkansas Razorbacks (NCAA) (primary)	
25		Empower Field at Mile High	76,125	Denver	Colorado	2001	Football	Denver Broncos (NFL)	
26		Camp Randall Stadium	76,057	Madison	Wisconsin	1917	Football	Wisconsin Badgers (NCAA)	
27		Spartan Stadium	75,005	East Lansing	Michigan	1923	Football	Michigan State Spartans (NCAA)	
28		Bank of America Stadium	74,867	Charlotte	North Carolina	1996	Football	Carolina Panthers (NFL); Duke's Mayo Bowl (NCAA); ACC Championship Game (NCAA); Charlotte FC (MLS)	
29		Caesars Superdome*	73,208	New Orleans	Louisiana	1975	Football	New Orleans Saints (NFL); Sugar Bowl (NCAA); New Orleans Bowl (NCAA); Bayou Classic (NCAA)	
30		Reliant Stadium*	72,220	Houston	Texas	2002	Football	Houston Texans (NFL); Texas Bowl (NCAA)	
31		Legion Field	71,594	Birmingham	Alabama	1926	Football		
32		Mercedes-Benz Stadium*	71,000	Atlanta	Georgia	2017	Football, soccer	Atlanta Falcons (NFL); Atlanta United FC (MLS); Peach Bowl (NCAA); SEC Championship Game (NCAA)	
33		M&T Bank Stadium	70,745	Baltimore	Maryland	1998	Football	Baltimore Ravens (NFL); Army–Navy Game (NCAA) (occasionally)	
34		SoFi Stadium	70,240	Inglewood	California	2020	Football	Los Angeles Rams (NFL); Los Angeles Chargers (NFL)	
35		Husky Stadium	70,083	Seattle	Washington	1920	Football	Washington Huskies (NCAA)	
36		Kinnick Stadium	69,250	Iowa City	Iowa	1929	Football	Iowa Hawkeyes (NCAA)	
37		Raymond James Stadium	69,218	Tampa	Florida	1998	Football	Tampa Bay Buccaneers (NFL); South Florida Bulls (NCAA); ReliaQuest Bowl (NCAA); Gasparilla Bowl (NCAA)	
38		Nissan Stadium	69,143	Nashville	Tennessee	1999	Football	Tennessee Titans (NFL); Tennessee State Tigers (NCAA); Music City Bowl (NCAA)	
39		Lumen Field	68,740	Seattle	Washington	2002	Football, soccer	Seattle Seahawks (NFL); Seattle Sounders FC (MLS); Seattle Reign FC (NWSL)	
40		Levi's Stadium	68,500	Santa Clara	California	2014	Football	San Francisco 49ers (NFL)	
41		Acrisure Stadium	68,400	Pittsburgh	Pennsylvania	2001	Football	Pittsburgh Steelers (NFL); Pittsburgh Panthers (NCAA)	
42		EverBank Stadium	67,814	Jacksonville	Florida	1995	Football	Jacksonville Jaguars (NFL); Gator Bowl (NCAA); Florida vs. Georgia Football Classic (NCAA)	
43		Lincoln Financial Field	67,594	Philadelphia	Pennsylvania	2003	Football	Philadelphia Eagles (NFL); Temple Owls (NCAA); Army–Navy Game (NCAA) (most years)	
44		Huntington Bank Field	67,431	Cleveland	Ohio	1999	Football	Cleveland Browns (NFL)	
45		Doak Campbell Stadium	67,277	Tallahassee	Florida	1950	Football	Florida State Seminoles (NCAA)	
46		The Dome at America's Center*	67,277	St. Louis	Missouri	1995	Football	St. Louis Battlehawks (UFL)	
47		US Bank Stadium*	66,860	Minneapolis	Minnesota	2016	Football, Baseball	Minnesota Vikings (NFL)	
48		Lane Stadium	65,632	Blacksburg	Virginia	1965	Football	Virginia Tech Hokies (NCAA)	
49		Paycor Stadium	65,515	Cincinnati	Ohio	2000	Football	Cincinnati Bengals (NFL)	
50		Ford Field*	65,000	Detroit	Michigan	2002	Football	Detroit Lions (NFL); GameAbove Sports Bowl (NCAA); MAC Championship Game (NCAA)	
51		Allegiant Stadium*	65,000	Las Vegas	Nevada	2020	Football	Las Vegas Raiders (NFL); UNLV Rebels (NCAA); Las Vegas Bowl (NCAA)	
52		Hard Rock Stadium	64,767	Miami Gardens	Florida	1987	Football	Miami Dolphins (NFL); Miami Hurricanes (NCAA); Orange Bowl (NCAA)	
53		Gillette Stadium	64,628	Foxborough	Massachusetts	2002	Football, soccer	New England Patriots (NFL); New England Revolution (MLS); Boston Legacy FC (NWSL) (2026)	
54		Vaught–Hemingway Stadium	64,038	Oxford	Mississippi	1915	Football	Ole Miss Rebels (NCAA)	
55		Alamodome*	64,000	San Antonio	Texas	1993	Football	UTSA Roadrunners (NCAA); Alamo Bowl (NCAA); U.S. Army All-American Bowl (High School)	
56		Northwest Stadium	64,000	Landover	Maryland	1997	Football	Washington Commanders (NFL)	
57		Faurot Field	63,609	Columbia	Missouri	1926	Football	Missouri Tigers (NCAA)	
58		LaVell Edwards Stadium	63,470	Provo	Utah	1964	Football	BYU Cougars (NCAA)	
59		State Farm Stadium*	63,400	Glendale	Arizona	2006	Football	Arizona Cardinals (NFL); Fiesta Bowl (NCAA)	
60		California Memorial Stadium	63,186	Berkeley	California	1923	Football	California Golden Bears (NCAA)	
61		Lucas Oil Stadium*	63,000	Indianapolis	Indiana	2008	Football	Indianapolis Colts (NFL); Big Ten Championship Game (NCAA)	
62		Highmark Stadium	63,000	Orchard Park	New York	2026	Football	Buffalo Bills (NFL)	
63		Soldier Field	61,500	Chicago	Illinois	1924;2003	Football, soccer	Chicago Bears (NFL); Chicago Fire (MLS)	
64		Scott Stadium	61,500	Charlottesville	Virginia	1931	Football	Virginia Cavaliers (NCAA)	
65		Jack Trice Stadium	61,500	Ames	Iowa	1975	Football	Iowa State Cyclones (NCAA)	
66		Yale Bowl	61,446	New Haven	Connecticut	1914	Football	Yale Bulldogs (NCAA)	
67		Ross–Ade Stadium	61,441	West Lafayette	Indiana	1924	Football	Purdue Boilermakers (NCAA)	
68		Davis Wade Stadium	61,337	Starkville	Mississippi	1914	Football	Mississippi State Bulldogs (NCAA)	
69		Kroger Field	61,000	Lexington	Kentucky	1973	Football	Kentucky Wildcats (NCAA)	
70		Cardinal Stadium	60,800	Louisville	Kentucky	1998	Football	Louisville Cardinals (NCAA)	
71		Memorial Stadium	60,670	Champaign	Illinois	1923	Football	Illinois Fighting Illini (NCAA)	
72		Mississippi Veterans Memorial Stadium	60,492	Jackson	Mississippi	1941	Football	Jackson State Tigers (NCAA)	
73		Galaxy Stadium	60,454	Lubbock	Texas	1947	Football	Texas Tech Red Raiders (NCAA)	
74		Camping World Stadium	60,219	Orlando	Florida	1936	Football	Florida Classic (NCAA); Citrus Bowl (NCAA); Pop-Tarts Bowl (NCAA)	
75		Mountaineer Field	60,000	Morgantown	West Virginia	1980	Football	West Virginia Mountaineers (NCAA)	
76		Carter–Finley Stadium	56,919	Raleigh	North Carolina	1966	Football	NC State Wolfpack (NCAA)	
77		Dodger Stadium	56,000	Los Angeles	California	1962	Baseball	Los Angeles Dodgers (MLB)	
78		Bobby Dodd Stadium at Historic Grant Field	55,000	Atlanta	Georgia	1913	Football	Georgia Tech Yellow Jackets (NCAA)	
79		War Memorial Stadium	54,120	Little Rock	Arkansas	1948	Football	Arkansas Razorbacks (NCAA) (secondary to Razorback Stadium)	
80		Autzen Stadium	54,000	Eugene	Oregon	1967	Football	Oregon Ducks (NCAA)	
81		Mountain America Stadium	53,599	Tempe	Arizona	1958	Football	Arizona State Sun Devils (NCAA)	
82		Memorial Stadium	52,626	Bloomington	Indiana	1960	Football	Indiana Hoosiers (NCAA)	
83		Franklin Field	52,593	Philadelphia	Pennsylvania	1895	Football	Penn Quakers (NCAA)	
84		SHI Stadium	52,454	Piscataway	New Jersey	1994	Football	Rutgers Scarlet Knights (NCAA)	
85		Boone Pickens Stadium	52,202	Stillwater	Oklahoma	1920	Football	Oklahoma State Cowboys (NCAA)	
86		SECU Stadium	51,802	College Park	Maryland	1950	Football	Maryland Terrapins (NCAA)	
87		Sun Bowl	51,500	El Paso	Texas	1963	Football	UTEP Miners (NCAA); Sun Bowl (NCAA)	
88		Rice–Eccles Stadium	51,444	Salt Lake City	Utah	1998	Football	Utah Utes (NCAA)	
89		Dowdy–Ficklen Stadium	51,000	Greenville	North Carolina	1963	Football	East Carolina Pirates (NCAA)	
90		Independence Stadium	50,832	Shreveport	Louisiana	1925	Football	Independence Bowl (NCAA); Local high school teams	
91		Huntington Bank Stadium	50,805	Minneapolis	Minnesota	2009	Football	Minnesota Golden Gophers (NCAA)	
92		Arizona Stadium	50,800	Tucson	Arizona	1928	Football	Arizona Wildcats (NCAA); Arizona Bowl (NCAA)	
93		Kenan Memorial Stadium	50,500	Chapel Hill	North Carolina	1927	Football	North Carolina Tar Heels (NCAA)	
94		Stanford Stadium	50,424	Stanford	California	1921;2006	Football	Stanford Cardinal (NCAA)	
95		Folsom Field	50,183	Boulder	Colorado	1924	Football	Colorado Buffaloes (NCAA)	
96		Simmons Bank Liberty Stadium	50,000	Memphis	Tennessee	1965	Football	Memphis Tigers (NCAA); Liberty Bowl (NCAA)	
97		Bill Snyder Family Football Stadium	50,000	Manhattan	Kansas	1968	Football	Kansas State Wildcats (NCAA)	
98		JMA Wireless Dome	49,057	Syracuse	New York	1980	Multi-purpose	Syracuse Orange (NCAA)	
99		Chase Field*	48,405	Phoenix	Arizona	1998	Baseball	Arizona Diamondbacks (MLB); Rate Bowl (NCAA)	
100		Choctaw Stadium	48,114	Arlington	Texas	1994	Multi-purpose	North Texas SC (USL League One)	
101		T-Mobile Park	47,929	Seattle	Washington	1999	Baseball	Seattle Mariners (MLB)	
102		David Booth Kansas Memorial Stadium	47,233	Lawrence	Kansas	1921	Football	Kansas Jayhawks (NCAA)	
103		Protective Stadium	47,100	Birmingham	Alabama	2021	Football	UAB Blazers (NCAA); Birmingham Legion FC (USL Championship); Birmingham Bowl (NCAA); Birmingham Stallions (UFL)	
104		Amon G. Carter Stadium	47,000	Fort Worth	Texas	1930	Football	TCU Horned Frogs (NCAA); Armed Forces Bowl (NCAA)	
105		Rice Stadium	47,000	Houston	Texas	1950	Football	Rice Owls (NCAA)	
106		Coors Field	46,897	Denver	Colorado	1995	Baseball	Colorado Rockies (MLB)	
107		Oakland Coliseum	46,847	Oakland	California	1966	Multi-purpose	Oakland Roots SC, Oakland Soul SC	
108		Falcon Stadium	46,692	Colorado Springs	Colorado	1962	Football	Air Force Falcons (NCAA)	
109		Yankee Stadium	46,537	Bronx	New York	2009	Baseball, soccer	New York Yankees (MLB); New York City FC (MLS); Pinstripe Bowl (NCAA)	
110		Angel Stadium	45,517	Anaheim	California	1966	Baseball	Los Angeles Angels (MLB)	
111		FBC Mortgage Stadium	45,301	Orlando	Florida	2007	Football	UCF Knights (NCAA); Cure Bowl (NCAA)	
112		McLane Stadium	45,140	Waco	Texas	2014	Football	Baylor Bears (NCAA)	
113		Oriole Park	44,970	Baltimore	Maryland	1992	Baseball	Baltimore Orioles (MLB)	
114		Alumni Stadium	44,500	Chestnut Hill	Massachusetts	1957	Football	Boston College Eagles (NCAA)	
115		Busch Stadium	44,383	St. Louis	Missouri	2006	Baseball	St. Louis Cardinals (MLB)	
116		Great American Ball Park	43,500	Cincinnati	Ohio	2003	Baseball	Cincinnati Reds (MLB)	
117		Citizens Bank Park	42,901	Philadelphia	Pennsylvania	2004	Baseball	Philadelphia Phillies (MLB)	
118		Tropicana Field*	42,735	St. Petersburg	Florida	1990	Baseball	Tampa Bay Rays (MLB); East–West Shrine Game (NCAA)	
119		Citi Field	41,922	Queens	New York	2009	Baseball	New York Mets (MLB)	
120		Oracle Park	41,915	San Francisco	California	2000	Baseball	San Francisco Giants (MLB)	
121		American Family Field	41,900	Milwaukee	Wisconsin	2001	Baseball	Milwaukee Brewers (MLB)	
122		Wrigley Field	41,649	Chicago	Illinois	1914	Baseball	Chicago Cubs (MLB)	
123		Nationals Park	41,339	Washington, D.C.	District of Columbia	2008	Baseball	Washington Nationals (MLB)	
124		Cajun Field	41,264	Lafayette	Louisiana	1971	Football	Louisiana Ragin' Cajuns (NCAA)	
125		Daikin Park	41,168	Houston	Texas	2000	Baseball	Houston Astros (MLB)	
126		Truist Park	41,084	Cumberland	Georgia	2017	Baseball	Atlanta Braves (MLB)	
127		Comerica Park	41,083	Detroit	Michigan	2000	Baseball	Detroit Tigers (MLB)	
128		Valley Children's Stadium	40,727	Fresno	California	1980	Football	Fresno State Bulldogs (NCAA)	
129		Rate Field	40,615	Chicago	Illinois	1991	Baseball	Chicago White Sox (MLB)	
130		FirstBank Stadium	35,000	Nashville	Tennessee	1922	Football	Vanderbilt Commodores (NCAA)	
131		Globe Life Field*	40,300	Arlington	Texas	2020	Baseball	Texas Rangers (MLB)	
132		Ladd-Peebles Stadium	40,000	Mobile	Alabama	1948	Football	Local high school sports	
133		TDECU Stadium	40,000	Houston	Texas	2014	Football	Houston Cougars (NCAA)	
134		Petco Park	39,860	San Diego	California	2004	Baseball	San Diego Padres (MLB)	
135		University Stadium	39,224	Albuquerque	New Mexico	1960	Football	New Mexico Lobos (NCAA); New Mexico Bowl (NCAA)	
136		PNC Park	38,747	Pittsburgh	Pennsylvania	2001	Baseball	Pittsburgh Pirates (MLB)	
137		Target Field	38,544	Minneapolis	Minnesota	2010	Baseball	Minnesota Twins (MLB)	
138		Nippert Stadium	38,088	Cincinnati	Ohio	1915	Football	Cincinnati Bearcats (NCAA)	
139		Pratt & Whitney Stadium	38,066	East Hartford	Connecticut	2003	Football	UConn Huskies (NCAA)	
140		Michie Stadium	38,000	West Point	New York	1924	Football	Army Black Knights (NCAA)	
141		Kauffman Stadium	37,903	Kansas City	Missouri	1973	Baseball	Kansas City Royals (MLB)	
142		Fenway Park	37,755	Boston	Massachusetts	1912	Baseball	Boston Red Sox (MLB); Fenway Bowl (NCAA)	
143		Sam Boyd Stadium	36,800	Las Vegas	Nevada	1971	Football	USA Sevens and Monster Jam World Finals	
144		LoanDepot Park	36,742	Miami	Florida	2012	Baseball	Miami Marlins (MLB)	
145		Canvas Stadium	36,500	Fort Collins	Colorado	2017	Football	Colorado State Rams (NCAA)	
146		Albertsons Stadium	36,387	Boise	Idaho	1970	Football	Boise State Broncos (NCAA); Famous Idaho Potato Bowl (NCAA)	
147		MM Roberts Stadium	36,000	Hattiesburg	Mississippi	1932	Football	Southern Miss Golden Eagles (NCAA)	
148		Reser Stadium	35,548	Corvallis	Oregon	1953	Football	Oregon State Beavers (NCAA)	
149		Wallace Wade Stadium	35,018	Durham	North Carolina	1929	Football	Duke Blue Devils (NCAA)	
150		Snapdragon Stadium	35,000	San Diego	California	2022	Football, soccer	San Diego State Aztecs (NCAA); San Diego FC (MLS); San Diego Wave FC (NWSL); Holiday Bowl (NCAA)	
151		Progressive Field	34,820	Cleveland	Ohio	1994	Baseball	Cleveland Guardians (MLB)	
152		Navy–Marine Corps Memorial Stadium	34,000	Annapolis	Maryland	1959	Football	Navy Midshipmen (NCAA); Annapolis Blues FC; Military Bowl (NCAA)	
153		Martin Stadium	32,952	Pullman	Washington	1972	Football	Washington State Cougars (NCAA)	
154		Gerald J. Ford Stadium	32,000	University Park	Texas	2000	Football	SMU Mustangs (NCAA); First Responder Bowl (NCAA)	
155		Allegacy Federal Credit Union Stadium	31,500	Winston-Salem	North Carolina	1968	Football	Wake Forest Demon Deacons (NCAA)	
156		DATCU Stadium	30,850	Denton	Texas	2011	Football	North Texas Mean Green (NCAA)	
157		Johnny "Red" Floyd Stadium	30,788	Murfreesboro	Tennessee	1933	Football	Middle Tennessee Blue Raiders (NCAA)	
158		Joan C. Edwards Stadium	30,475	Huntington	West Virginia	1991	Football	Marshall Thundering Herd (NCAA)	
159		Veterans Memorial Stadium	30,470	Troy	Alabama	1950	Football	Troy Trojans (NCAA)	
160		Centennial Bank Stadium	30,406	Jonesboro	Arkansas	1974	Football	Arkansas State Red Wolves (NCAA)	
161		Harvard Stadium	30,323	Allston	Massachusetts	1903	Football	Harvard Crimson (NCAA)	
162		Kelly/Shorts Stadium	30,255	Mount Pleasant	Michigan	1972	Football	Central Michigan Chippewas (NCAA)	
163		Waldo Stadium	30,200	Kalamazoo	Michigan	1939	Football	Western Michigan Broncos (NCAA)	
164		Rynearson Stadium	30,200	Ypsilanti	Michigan	1969	Football	Eastern Michigan Eagles (NCAA)	
165		Jonah Field at War Memorial Stadium	30,181	Laramie	Wyoming	1950	Football	Wyoming Cowboys (NCAA)	
166		UFCU Stadium	30,008	San Marcos	Texas	1981	Football	Texas State Bobcats (NCAA)	
167		HA Chapman Stadium	30,000	Tulsa	Oklahoma	1930	Football	Tulsa Golden Hurricane (NCAA)	
168		Kidd Brewer Stadium	30,000	Boone	North Carolina	1962	Football	Appalachian State Mountaineers (NCAA)	
169		William "Dick" Price Stadium	30,000	Norfolk	Virginia	1997	Football	Norfolk State Spartans (NCAA)	
170		InfoCision Stadium – Summa Field	30,000	Akron	Ohio	2009	Football	Akron Zips (NCAA)	
171		Benson Field at Yulman Stadium	30,000	New Orleans	Louisiana	2014	Football	Tulane Green Wave (NCAA)	
172		Geodis Park	30,000	Nashville	Tennessee	2022	Soccer	Nashville SC (MLS)	
173		FAU Stadium	29,571	Boca Raton	Florida	2011	Football	Florida Atlantic Owls (NCAA); Boca Raton Bowl (NCAA)	
174		Aggie Memorial Stadium	28,853	Las Cruces	New Mexico	1978	Football	New Mexico State Aggies (NCAA)	
175		Joe Aillet Stadium	28,562	Ruston	Louisiana	1960	Football	Louisiana Tech Bulldogs (NCAA)	
176		Princeton Stadium	27,773	Princeton	New Jersey	1998	Football	Princeton Tigers (NCAA)	
177		Malone Stadium	27,617	Monroe	Louisiana	1978	Football	Louisiana–Monroe Warhawks (NCAA)	
178		Mackay Stadium	27,000	Reno	Nevada	1966	Football	Nevada Wolf Pack (NCAA)	
179		Dignity Health Sports Park Soccer Stadium	27,000	Carson	California	2003	Soccer	Los Angeles Galaxy (MLS); RFCLA (Major League Rugby)	
180		Tad Gormley Stadium	26,500	New Orleans	Louisiana	1936	Multi-purpose		
181		ASU Stadium	26,500	Montgomery	Alabama	2012	Football	Alabama State Hornets (NCAA)	
182		The Glass Bowl	26,038	Toledo	Ohio	1937	Football	Toledo Rockets (NCAA)	
183		TQL Stadium	25,513	Cincinnati	Ohio	2021	Soccer	FC Cincinnati (MLS)	
184		Ace W. Mumford Stadium	25,500	Baton Rouge	Louisiana	1928	Football	Southern Jaguars (NCAA)	
185		Inter.co Stadium	25,500	Orlando	Florida	2017	Soccer	Orlando City SC (MLS); Orlando Pride (NWSL); Orlando Storm (UFL)	
186		Hancock Whitney Stadium	25,450	Mobile	Alabama	2020	Football	South Alabama Jaguars (NCAA); 68 Ventures Bowl (NCAA); Senior Bowl (NCAA)	
187		Dix Stadium	25,319	Kent	Ohio	1969	Football	Kent State Golden Flashes (NCAA)	
188		Providence Park	25,218	Portland	Oregon	1926	Soccer	Portland Timbers (MLS); Portland Thorns (NWSL); Portland State Vikings (NCAA)	
189		Washington–Grizzly Stadium	25,217	Missoula	Montana	1986	Football	Montana Grizzlies (NCAA)	
190		Maverik Stadium	25,100	Logan	Utah	1968	Football	Utah State Aggies (NCAA)	
191		UB Stadium	25,013	Amherst	New York	1993	Football	Buffalo Bulls (NCAA)	
192		Cramton Bowl	25,000	Montgomery	Alabama	1922	Football	Salute to Veterans Bowl (NCAA); Local high school teams	
193		Paulson Stadium	25,000	Statesboro	Georgia	1984	Football	Georgia Southern Eagles (NCAA)	
194		Williams Stadium	25,000	Lynchburg	Virginia	1989	Football	Liberty Flames (NCAA)	
195		Sports Illustrated Stadium	25,000	Harrison	New Jersey	2010	Soccer	Red Bull New York (MLS); Gotham FC (NWSL)	
196		Nu Stadium	25,000	Miami	Florida	2026	Soccer	Inter Miami FC (MLS)	
197		Bridgeforth Stadium	24,877	Harrisonburg	Virginia	1975	Football	James Madison Dukes (NCAA)	
198		Charles Schwab Field Omaha	24,505	Omaha	Nebraska	2011	Baseball	Creighton Bluejays (NCAA); College World Series (NCAA)	
199		Center Parc Stadium	24,333	Atlanta	Georgia	1996	Football	Georgia State Panthers (NCAA)	
200		Fred C. Yager Stadium	24,286	Oxford	Ohio	1983	Football	Miami RedHawks (NCAA)	
201		Don Peden Stadium	24,000	Athens	Ohio	1929	Football	Ohio Bobcats (NCAA)	
202		Memorial Stadium	24,000	Stephenville	Texas	1951	Football	Tarleton Texans (NCAA)	
203		Brigham Field at Huskie Stadium	24,000	DeKalb	Illinois	1965	Football	Northern Illinois Huskies (NCAA)	
204		Doyt L. Perry Stadium	24,000	Bowling Green	Ohio	1966	Football	Bowling Green Falcons (NCAA)	
205		Houchens Industries–LT Smith Stadium	23,776	Bowling Green	Kentucky	1968	Football	Western Kentucky Hilltoppers (NCAA)	
206		Arthur Ashe Stadium	23,711	Queens	New York	1997	Tennis	U.S. Open	
207		Fitton Field	23,500	Worcester	Massachusetts	1924	Football	Holy Cross Crusaders (NCAA)	
208		Tom Benson Hall of Fame Stadium	23,000	Canton	Ohio	1938	Football	Pro Football Hall of Fame Game (NFL); Canton McKinley Bulldogs (High School)	
209		City Stadium	22,611	Richmond	Virginia	1929	Soccer	Richmond Kickers (USL League One)	
210		AmFirst Stadium	22,500	Jacksonville	Alabama	1947	Football	Jacksonville State Gamecocks (NCAA)	
211		Jack Spinks Stadium	22,500	Lorman	Mississippi	1992	Football	Alcorn State Braves (NCAA)	
212		John B. and June M. Scheumann Stadium	22,500	Muncie	Indiana	1967	Football	Ball State Cardinals (NCAA)	
213		Energizer Park	22,423	St. Louis	Missouri	2022	Soccer	St. Louis City SC (MLS)	
214		Weingart Stadium	22,355	Monterey Park	California	1955	Multi-purpose	East Los Angeles Huskies (CCCAA)	
215		Shell Energy Stadium	22,039	Houston	Texas	2012	Soccer	Houston Dynamo (MLS); Texas Southern Tigers (NCAA); Houston Dash (NWSL); Houston Gamblers (UFL)	
216		World War I Memorial Stadium	22,000	Manhattan	Kansas	1922	Soccer, lacrosse	Kansas State Wildcats (NCAA)	
217		Edwards Stadium	22,000	Berkeley	California	1932	Soccer, Track and Field	California Golden Bears (NCAA)	
218		Delaware Stadium	22,000	Newark	Delaware	1952	Football	Delaware Fightin' Blue Hens (NCAA)	
219		Oliver C. Dawson Stadium	22,000	Orangeburg	South Carolina	1955	Football	South Carolina State Bulldogs (NCAA)	
220		BMO Stadium	22,000	Los Angeles	California	2018	Soccer	Los Angeles FC (MLS); Angel City FC (NWSL)	
221		Kornblau Field at S.B. Ballard Stadium	21,944	Norfolk	Virginia	1936	Football	Old Dominion Monarchs (NCAA)	
222		Schoellkopf Field	21,500	Ithaca	New York	1915	Football	Cornell Big Red (NCAA)	
223		BREC Memorial Stadium	21,500	Baton Rouge	Louisiana	1956	Football	Local high school teams	
224		Truist Stadium	21,500	Greensboro	North Carolina	1981	Football	North Carolina A&T Aggies (NCAA)	
225		Hornet Stadium	21,195	Sacramento	California	1969	Football	Sacramento State Hornets (NCAA)	
226		Louis Crews Stadium	21,000	Huntsville	Alabama	1996	Football	Alabama A&M Bulldogs (NCAA)	
227		Brooks Stadium	21,000	Conway	South Carolina	2003	Football	Coastal Carolina Chanticleers (NCAA); Myrtle Beach Bowl (NCAA)	
228		Chase Stadium	21,000	Fort Lauderdale	Florida	2020	Soccer		
229		Bobcat Stadium	20,767	Bozeman	Montana	1973	Football	Montana State Bobcats (NCAA)	
230		Q2 Stadium	20,738	Austin	Texas	2021	Soccer	Austin FC (MLS)	
231		Stambaugh Stadium	20,630	Youngstown	Ohio	1982	Football	Youngstown State Penguins (NCAA)	
232		Toyota Stadium	20,500	Frisco	Texas	2005	Soccer	FC Dallas (MLS); Frisco Bowl (NCAA); NCAA Division I Football Championship Game (FCS) (NCAA); Dallas Renegades (UFL)	
233		Finley Stadium	20,412	Chattanooga	Tennessee	1997	Football	Chattanooga Mocs (NCAA)	
234		ScottsMiracle-Gro Field	20,371	Columbus	Ohio	2021	Soccer	Columbus Crew (MLS)	
235		Hughes Stadium	20,311	Sacramento	California	1928	Multi-purpose		
236		America First Field	20,213	Sandy	Utah	2008	Soccer	Real Salt Lake (MLS); Utah Royals FC (NWSL)	
237		Brown Stadium	20,000	Providence	Rhode Island	1925	Football	Brown Bears (NCAA)	
238		Happy State Bank Stadium	20,000	Canyon	Texas	1959	Football	West Texas A&M Buffaloes (NCAA); Local high school teams	
239		Roy Kidd Stadium	20,000	Richmond	Kentucky	1969	Football	Eastern Kentucky Colonels (NCAA)	
240		Central Broward Park	20,000	Lauderhill	Florida	1969	Multi-purpose	Floridians FC, Fort Lauderdale Fighting Squids	
241		War Memorial Stadium	20,000	Wailuku	Hawaii	1969	Multi-purpose	Local high school teams	
242		Pitbull Stadium	20,000	Miami	Florida	1995	Football	FIU Golden Panthers (NCAA); Miami FC (USL Championship)	
243		Mike A. Myers Stadium	20,000	Austin	Texas	1997	Soccer, Track and Field	Texas Longhorns (NCAA)	
244		SeatGeek Stadium	20,000	Bridgeview	Illinois	2006	Soccer	Chicago Red Stars (NWSL); Chicago House AC (NISA); Chicago Hounds (MLR)	
245		Audi Field	20,000	Washington, D.C.	District of Columbia	2018	Multi-purpose	D.C. United (MLS); Washington Spirit (NWSL); DC Defenders (UFL)	
246		Historic Crew Stadium	19,968	Columbus	Ohio	1999	Soccer	Columbus Aviators (UFL)	
247		Bragg Memorial Stadium	19,633	Tallahassee	Florida	1957	Football	Florida A&M Rattlers (NCAA)	
248		Eddie G. Robinson Memorial Stadium	19,600	Grambling	Louisiana	1983	Football	Grambling State Tigers (NCAA)	
249		Memorial Stadium	19,468	Bakersfield	California	1955	Multi-purpose	Bakersfield Renegades (CCCAA)	
250		Mesquite Memorial Stadium	19,400	Mesquite	Texas	1977	Football	Local high school teams	
251		Allianz Field	19,400	St. Paul	Minnesota	2019	Soccer	Minnesota United FC (MLS)	
252		Dana J. Dykhouse Stadium	19,340	Brookings	South Dakota	2016	Football	South Dakota State Jackrabbits (NCAA)	
253		Fargodome	18,700	Fargo	North Dakota	1992	Multi-purpose	North Dakota State Bison (NCAA)	
254		UC Stadium at Laidley Field	18,500	Charleston	West Virginia	1979	Football, track	Charleston Golden Eagles (NCAA)	
255		Subaru Park	18,500	Chester	Pennsylvania	2010	Soccer	Philadelphia Union (MLS)	
256		Children's Mercy Park	18,467	Kansas City	Kansas	2011	Soccer	Sporting Kansas City (MLS)	
257		Hiram Bithorn Stadium	18,264	San Juan	Puerto Rico	1962	Baseball	Cangrejeros de Santurce	
258		CEFCU Stadium	18,203	San Jose	California	1933	Football	San Jose State Spartans (NCAA)	
259		Dick's Sporting Goods Park	18,061	Commerce City	Colorado	2007	Soccer	Colorado Rapids (MLS)	
260		Astound Broadband Stadium	18,000	Midland	Texas	2002	Football	High School teams Tall City Black Gold (CoFL)	
261		PayPal Park	18,000	San Jose	California	2015	Soccer	San Jose Earthquakes (MLS); Bay FC (NWSL)	
262		Ratliff Stadium	17,931	Odessa	Texas	1982	Football	Local high school teams	
263		Cowboy Stadium	17,610	Lake Charles	Louisiana	1965	Football	McNeese Cowboys (NCAA)	
264		Robert W. Plaster Stadium	17,500	Springfield	Missouri	1941	Football	Missouri State Bears (NCAA)	
265		Stewart Stadium	17,312	Ogden	Utah	1966	Football	Weber State Wildcats (NCAA)	
266		Robert K. Kraft Field at Lawrence A. Wien Stadium	17,000	New York	New York	1923	Multi-purpose	Columbia Lions (NCAA)	
267		Warren McGuirk Alumni Stadium	17,000	Hadley	Massachusetts	1965	Multi-purpose	UMass Minutemen (NCAA)	
268		Harder Stadium	17,000	Santa Barbara	California	1966	Soccer	UC Santa Barbara Gauchos (NCAA)	
269		Round-Up Stadium	17,000	Pendleton	Oregon		Rodeo	Pendleton Round-Up; Pendleton Buckaroos (OSAA)	
270		Clarence T. C. Ching Athletics Complex	16,909	Honolulu	Hawaii	2015	Multi-purpose	Hawaii Rainbow Warriors (NCAA); Hawaii Bowl (NCAA)	
271		Roy Stewart Stadium	16,800	Murray	Kentucky	1973	Football	Murray State Racers (NCAA)	
272		Paul Brown Tiger Stadium	16,600	Massillon	Ohio	1939	Football	Washington High School (High School)	
273		Sahlen Field	16,600	Buffalo	New York	1988	Baseball	Buffalo Bisons (IL)	
274		Tucker Stadium	16,500	Cookeville	Tennessee	1966	Football	Tennessee Tech Golden Eagles (NCAA)	
275		Hanson Field	16,368	Macomb	Illinois	1950	Football	Western Illinois Leathernecks (NCAA)	
276		UNI-Dome	16,324	Cedar Falls	Iowa	1976	Football	Northern Iowa Panthers (NCAA)	
277		Stadium 1	16,100	Indian Wells	California	2014	Tennis		
278		Provost Umphrey Stadium	16,000	Beaumont	Texas	1964	Football	Lamar Cardinals (NCAA)	
279		Stallworth Stadium	16,000	Baytown	Texas	1969	Football, soccer		
280		Kibbie Dome	16,000	Moscow	Idaho	1971	Football	Idaho Vandals (NCAA)	
281		Paladin Stadium	16,000	Greenville	South Carolina	1981	Football, soccer	Furman Paladins (NCAA); Greenville Triumph SC (USL League One); Greenville Liberty SC (USL W League)	
282		Goodman Stadium	16,000	Bethlehem	Pennsylvania	1988	Football	Lehigh Mountain Hawks (NCAA)	
283		Simmons Bank Field	16,000	Pine Bluff	Arkansas	2000	Football	Arkansas–Pine Bluff Golden Lions (NCAA)	
284		Harry Turpin Stadium	15,971	Natchitoches	Louisiana	1975	Football	Northwestern State Demons (NCAA)	
285		Hersheypark Stadium	15,641	Hershey	Pennsylvania	1939	Football, soccer		
286		James R. Hallford Stadium	15,600	Clarkston	Georgia	1968	Football		
287		Jerry Richardson Stadium	15,314	Charlotte	North Carolina	2013	Football	Charlotte 49ers (NCAA)	
288		Stadium Bowl	15,000	Tacoma	Washington	1910	Football		
289		Quigley Stadium	15,000	Little Rock	Arkansas	1936	Football		
290		Greenway Avenue Stadium	15,000	Cumberland	Maryland	1937	Football		
291		J. Birney Crum Stadium	15,000	Allentown	Pennsylvania	1948	Football, soccer		
292		Dick Bivins Stadium	15,000	Amarillo	Texas	1950	Football		
293		Saluki Stadium	15,000	Carbondale	Illinois	2010	Football	Southern Illinois Salukis (NCAA)	
294		Sloan Park	15,000	Mesa	Arizona	2014	Baseball	Mesa Solar Sox (AFL)	
295		Panther Stadium at Blackshear Field	15,000	Prairie View	Texas	2016	Football	Prairie View A&M Panthers (NCAA)	
296		Homer Bryce Stadium	14,575	Nacogdoches	Texas	1973	Football	Stephen F. Austin Lumberjacks (NCAA)	
297		Drake Stadium	14,557	Des Moines	Iowa	1925	Football, soccer	Drake Bulldogs (NCAA)	
298		Smith's Ballpark	14,511	Salt Lake City	Utah	1994	Baseball	Salt Lake Bees (PCL)	
299		Braly Municipal Stadium	14,215	Florence	Alabama	1949	Football	North Alabama Lions (NCAA)	
300		Louis Armstrong Stadium	14,053	Queens	New York	2018	Tennis		
301		Bowers Stadium	14,000	Huntsville	Texas	1986	Football	Sam Houston Bearkats (NCAA)	
302		Rhodes Stadium	14,000	Elon	North Carolina	2001	Football	Elon Phoenix (NCAA)	
303		Ray Stadium	14,000	Meridian	Mississippi	1936	Football		
304		Rochester Community Sports Complex Stadium	13,768	Rochester	New York	2006	Soccer	Flower City Union (NISA)	
305		Bob Waters Field at EJ Whitmire Stadium	13,742	Cullowhee	North Carolina	1974	Football	Western Carolina Catamounts (NCAA)	
306		McAllen Veterans Memorial Stadium	13,500	McAllen	Texas	1976	Football, soccer		
307		Robert and Janet Vackar Stadium	13,500	Edinburg	Texas	2017	Football	UTRGV Vanqueros (NCAA)	
308		Innovative Field	13,500	Rochester	New York	1997	Baseball	Rochester Red Wings (IL)	
309		Hancock Stadium	13,391	Normal	Illinois	1963	Football	Illinois State Redbirds (NCAA)	
310		Fisher Stadium	13,132	Easton	Pennsylvania	1926	Football	Lafayette Leopards (NCAA)	
311		Louisville Slugger Field	13,131	Louisville	Kentucky	2000	Baseball	Louisville Bats (IL)	
312		Christy Mathewson–Memorial Stadium	13,100	Lewisburg	Pennsylvania	1924	Football	Bucknell Bison (NCAA)	
313		Gibbs Stadium	13,000	Spartanburg	South Carolina	1996	Football	Wofford Terriers (NCAA)	
314		Camelback Ranch	13,000	Phoenix	Arizona	2009	Baseball	Glendale Desert Dogs (AFL)	
315		Memorial Stadium	12,764	Terre Haute	Indiana	1924	Football, soccer	Indiana State Sycamores (NCAA)	
316		Pasadena Memorial Stadium	12,700	Pasadena	Texas	1965	Football, soccer		
317		Zable Stadium	12,672	Williamsburg	Virginia	1935	Football	William & Mary Tribe (NCAA)	
318		Hayward Field	12,650	Eugene	Oregon	1919	Track and Field	Oregon Ducks (NCAA)	
319		Villanova Stadium	12,500	Villanova	Pennsylvania	1927	Football, Field lacrosse	Villanova Wildcats (NCAA)	
320		Juan Ramón Loubriel Stadium	12,500	Bayamón	Puerto Rico	1973	Soccer	Bayamón Fútbol Club	
321		Pennington Field	12,500	Bedford	Texas	1987	Football, soccer		
322		Joy and Ralph Ellis Stadium	12,500	Irving	Texas		Football, soccer		
323		Kenneth P. LaValle Stadium	12,300	Stony Brook	New York	2002	Football	Stony Brook Seawolves (NCAA)	
324		Alerus Center	12,283	Grand Forks	North Dakota	2001	Multi-purpose	North Dakota Fighting Hawks (NCAA)	
325		Victory Field	12,230	Indianapolis	Indiana	1996	Baseball	Indianapolis Indians (IL)	
326		Wheeling Island Stadium	12,220	Wheeling	West Virginia	1927	Football, soccer		
327		Mayagüez Athletics Stadium	12,175	Mayagüez	Puerto Rico	2010	Soccer	Puerto Rico Sol FC	
328		Swayze Field	12,152	Oxford	Mississippi	1988	Baseball	Ole Miss Rebels (NCAA)	
329		The Diamond	12,134	Richmond	Virginia	1985	Baseball	Richmond Flying Squirrels (Eastern); VCU Rams (NCAA)	
330		IU Michael A. Carroll Track & Soccer Stadium	12,111	Indianapolis	Indiana	1982	Soccer	Indy Eleven (USL Championship); IUPUI Jaguars (NCAA)	
331		Harbor Park	12,067	Norfolk	Virginia	1993	Baseball	Norfolk Tides (IL)	
332		Northwestern Medicine Field at Martin Stadium	12,023	Evanston	Illinois	1997	Football, lacrosse, soccer	Northwestern Wildcats (NCAA)	
333	AJWStadiumNE	Audrey J. Walton Stadium (Central Missouri)	12,000	Warrensburg	Missouri	1928	Football	Central Missouri (NCAA)	
334		Armstrong Stadium	12,000	Hampton	Virginia	1928	Football	Hampton Pirates (NCAA)	
335		John F. Kennedy Stadium	12,000	Bridgeport	Connecticut	1964	Multi-purpose		
336		ICCU Dome	12,000	Pocatello	Idaho	1970	Football	Idaho State Bengals (NCAA)	
337		Scottsdale Stadium	12,000	Scottsdale	Arizona	1992	Baseball	Scottsdale Scorpions (AFL)	
338		CH Collins Stadium	12,000	Denton	Texas	2004	Football, soccer		
339		Ford Center	12,000	Frisco	Texas	2016	Football		
340		Anthony Field at Wildcat Stadium	12,000	Abilene	Texas	2017	Football	Abilene Christian Wildcats (NCAA)	
341		Martin Stadium	12,000	Valdosta	Georgia	1966	Football	Lowndes Plowboys	
342		James M. Shuart Stadium	11,929	Hempstead	New York	1963	Multi-purpose		
343		Lynn Family Stadium	11,700	Louisville	Kentucky	2020	Soccer	Louisville City FC (USL Championship); Racing Louisville FC (NWSL) Louisville Kings (UFL)	
344		Dell Diamond	11,631	Round Rock	Texas	2000	Baseball	Round Rock Express (PCL)	
345		Ernest Hawkins Field at Memorial Stadium	11,582	Commerce	Texas	1950	Football	Texas A&M–Commerce Lions (NCAA)	
346		Heart Health Park	11,569	Sacramento	California	2014	Soccer	Sacramento Republic FC (USL Championship)	
347		Principal Park	11,500	Des Moines	Iowa	1992	Baseball	Iowa Cubs (IL)	
348		Kino Sports Complex	11,500	Tucson	Arizona	1998	Baseball	Tucson Saguaros (Pecos)	
349		CPKC Stadium	11,500	Kansas City	Missouri	2024	Soccer	Kansas City Current (NWSL)	
350		Center Court	11,435	Mason	Ohio	1981	Tennis		
351		Johnson Hagood Stadium	11,427	Charleston	South Carolina	1948	Football	The Citadel Bulldogs (NCAA)	
352		Peoria Sports Complex	11,333	Peoria	Arizona	1994	Baseball	Peoria Javelinas (AFL)	
353		Walkup Skydome	11,230	Flagstaff	Arizona	1977	Football	Northern Arizona Lumberjacks (NCAA)	
354		Johnny Unitas Stadium	11,198	Towson	Maryland	1978	Football	Towson Tigers (NCAA)	
355		Isotopes Park	11,124	Albuquerque	New Mexico	2003	Baseball, soccer	Albuquerque Isotopes (PCL); New Mexico United (USL Championship)	
356		Alex G. Spanos Stadium	11,075	San Luis Obispo	California	1935	Football, soccer	Cal Poly Mustangs (NCAA)	
357		George M. Steinbrenner Field	11,026	Tampa	Florida	1996	Baseball	Tampa Tarpons (FSL)	
358		Wildcat Stadium	11,015	Durham	New Hampshire	1936	Football	New Hampshire Wildcats (NCAA)	
359		Memorial Field	11,000	Hanover	New Hampshire	1893	Football	Dartmouth Big Green (NCAA)	
360		Atwood Stadium	11,000	Flint	Michigan	1929	Football, soccer	Flint City Bucks (USL League Two)	
361		Welcome Stadium	11,000	Dayton	Ohio	1949	Football	Dayton Flyers (NCAA)	
362		White Stadium	11,000	Boston	Massachusetts	1949	Multi-purpose	Boston Legacy FC (NWSL) (2027)	
363		VyStar Ballpark	11,000	Jacksonville	Florida	2003	Baseball	Jacksonville Jumbo Shrimp (IL)	
364		Charlie W. Johnson Stadium	11,000	Columbia	South Carolina	2006	Football	Benedict Tigers (NCAA)	
365		Salt River Fields at Talking Stick	11,000	Scottsdale	Arizona	2011	Baseball	Salt River Rafters (AFL)	
366		Albany State University Coliseum	11,000	Georgia	Georgia		Football	Albany State Golden Rams (NCAA)	
367		Cy-Fair FCU Stadium	11,000	Cypress	Texas		Football, soccer		
368		Miller Stadium	11,000	Indiana	Pennsylvania		Football, Track and Field	IUP Crimson Hawks (NCAA)	
369		Tucson Rodeo Grounds	11,000	Tucson	Arizona		Rodeo	Tucson Rodeo	
370		JetBlue Park	10,823	Fort Myers	Florida	2012	Baseball	Boston Red Sox (Spring Training)	
371		NBT Bank Stadium	10,815	Syracuse	New York	1997	Baseball	Syracuse Mets (IL)	
372		Hoover Metropolitan Stadium	10,800	Hoover	Alabama	1988	Multi-purpose	Hoover High School football SEC baseball tournament	
373		UC Davis Health Stadium	10,743	Davis	California	2007	Football	UC Davis Aggies (NCAA)	
374		Baum–Walker Stadium	10,737	Fayetteville	Arkansas	1996	Baseball	Arkansas Razorbacks (NCAA)	
375		Surprise Stadium	10,714	Surprise	Arizona	2002	Baseball	Surprise Saguaros (AFL)	
376		Chukchansi Park	10,650	Fresno	California	2002	Baseball	Fresno Grizzlies (CL)	
377		Sutter Health Park	10,624	Sacramento	California	2000	Baseball	Sacramento River Cats (PCL); Oakland Athletics (MLB)	
378		American Legion Memorial Stadium	10,500	Charlotte	North Carolina	1936	Football, soccer	Anthem Rugby Carolina (Major League Rugby); Charlotte Independence (USL League One)	
379		Manning Field at John L. Guidry Stadium	10,500	Thibodaux	Louisiana	1972	Football	Nicholls Colonels (NCAA)	
380		Greater Zion Stadium	10,500	St. George	Utah	1985	Football	Utah Tech Trailblazers (NCAA)	
381		Hohokam Stadium	10,500	Mesa	Arizona	1997	Baseball		
382		Isidoro García Stadium	10,500	Mayagüez	Puerto Rico	2010	Baseball	Indios de Mayagüez	
383		Centreville Bank Stadium	10,500	Pawtucket	Rhode Island	2025	Soccer	Rhode Island FC	
384		Route 66 Stadium	10,486	Springfield	Missouri	2004	Baseball	Springfield Cardinals (TL); Missouri State Bears (NCAA)	
385		Lubbers Stadium	10,444	Allendale	Michigan	1972	Football	Grand Valley State Lakers (NCAA)	
386		Coolray Field	10,427	Lawrenceville	Georgia	2009	Baseball	Gwinnett Stripers (IL)	
387		Mansion Park	10,400	Altoona	Pennsylvania	1989	Multi-purpose	Altoona Mountain Lions	
388		Alex Box Stadium	10,326	Baton Rouge	Louisiana	2009	Baseball	LSU Tigers (NCAA)	
389		Riders Field	10,316	Frisco	Texas	2003	Baseball	Frisco RoughRiders (TL)	
390		Fifth Third Field	10,300	Toledo	Ohio	2002	Baseball	Toledo Mud Hens (IL)	
391		Crown Field at Andy Kerr Stadium	10,221	Hamilton	New York	1939	Football, field lacrosse	Colgate Raiders (NCAA)	
392		Credit One Stadium	10,200	Charleston	South Carolina	2001	Tennis		
393		Coca-Cola Park	10,200	Allentown	Pennsylvania	2008	Baseball	Lehigh Valley IronPigs (IL)	
394		Fifth Third Stadium	10,200	Kennesaw	Georgia	2010	Football	Kennesaw State (NCAA)	
395		Five Star Stadium	10,200	Macon	Georgia	2013	Football	Mercer Bears (NCAA)	
396		Truist Field	10,200	Charlotte	North Carolina	2014	Baseball	Charlotte Knights (IL)	
397		Mitchel Athletic Complex	10,102	Uniondale	New York	1984	Soccer, Football, Track and Field		
398		Huntington Park	10,100	Columbus	Ohio	2009	Baseball	Columbus Clippers (IL)	
399		Riverfront Stadium	10,025	Wichita	Kansas	2021	Baseball	Wichita Wind Surge (TL)	
400		Tiger Stadium	10,001	Corsicana	Texas	2006	Football, soccer		
401		William H. Greene Stadium	10,000	Washington, D.C.	District of Columbia	1926	Football	Howard Bison (NCAA)	
402		Houck Stadium	10,000	Cape Girardeau	Missouri	1930	Football	Southeast Missouri State Redhawks (NCAA)	
403		Mitchell Stadium	10,000	Bluefield	West Virginia	1936	Football		
404		Hughes Stadium	10,000	Baltimore	Maryland	1937	Football	Morgan State Bears (NCAA)	
405		Estes Stadium	10,000	Conway	Arkansas	1939	Football	Central Arkansas Bears (NCAA)	
406		Fortera Stadium	10,000	Clarksville	Tennessee	1946	Football	Austin Peay Governors (NCAA)	
407		Alfond Stadium	10,000	Orono	Maine	1947	Football	Maine Black Bears (NCAA)	
408		Suplizio Field	10,000	Grand Junction	Colorado	1949	Baseball	Grand Junction Jackalopes (Pioneer)	
409		FirstEnergy Stadium	10,000	Reading	Pennsylvania	1951	Baseball	Reading Fightin Phils (Eastern)	
410		Kingston Stadium	10,000	Cedar Rapids	Iowa	1952	Football, soccer		
411		Howard Wood Field	10,000	Sioux Falls	South Dakota	1957	Football, soccer		
412		Rice–Totten Stadium	10,000	Itta Bena	Mississippi	1958	Football	Mississippi Valley State Delta Devils (NCAA)	
413		Howard J. Lamade Stadium	10,000	South Williamsport	Pennsylvania	1959	Baseball	Little League World Series	
414		Alumni Memorial Field	10,000	Lexington	Virginia	1962	Football	VMI Keydets (NCAA)	
415		Jayne Stadium	10,000	Morehead	Kentucky	1964	Football	Morehead State Eagles (NCAA)	
416		O'Brien Field	10,000	Charleston	Illinois	1970	Football	Eastern Illinois Panthers (NCAA)	
417		O'Kelly–Riddick Stadium	10,000	Durham	North Carolina	1975	Football	North Carolina Central Eagles (NCAA)	
418		Daytona Stadium	10,000	Daytona Beach	Florida	1979	Football	Bethune–Cookman Wildcats (NCAA)	
419		PNC Field	10,000	Moosic	Pennsylvania	1989	Baseball	Scranton/Wilkes-Barre Highlanders (IL)	
420		Northwestern Medicine Field	10,000	Geneva	Illinois	1991	Baseball	Kane County Cougars (American Association)	
421		Titan Stadium	10,000	Fullerton	California	1992	Soccer	Cal State Fullerton Titans (NCAA)	
422		LMCU Ballpark	10,000	Comstock Park	Michigan	1994	Baseball	West Michigan Whitecaps (Midwest League)	
423		Prince George's Stadium	10,000	Bowie	Maryland	1994	Baseball	Bowie Baysox (Eastern)	
424		Durham Bulls Athletic Park	10,000	Durham	North Carolina	1995	Baseball	Durham Bulls (IL)	
425		Gold Mine on Airline	10,000	Metairie	Louisiana	1997	Multi-purpose	New Orleans Gold (MLR)	
426		American Family Fields of Phoenix	10,000	Phoenix	Arizona	1998	Baseball		
427		Autozone Park	10,000	Memphis	Tennessee	2000	Baseball, soccer	Memphis Redbirds (IL); Memphis 901 FC (USL Championship)	
428		WakeMed Soccer Park	10,000	Cary	North Carolina	2002	Soccer	North Carolina Courage (NWSL); North Carolina FC (USL League One); Carolina Flyers (AUDL)	
429		University Stadium	10,000	Carrollton	Georgia	2009	Football	West Georgia Wolves (NCAA)	
430		First Horizon Park	10,000	Nashville	Tennessee	2015	Baseball	Nashville Sounds (IL)	
431		Las Vegas Ballpark	10,000	Las Vegas	Nevada	2019	Baseball	Las Vegas Aviators (PCL)	
432		Wild Horse Pass Stadium	10,000	Chandler	Arizona	2021	Soccer	Phoenix Rising FC (USL Championship)	
433		Citrus Stadium	10,000	Glendora	California		Football, Soccer, Track and Field		
434		Jerry Comalander Stadium	10,000	San Antonio	Texas		Football, soccer		
435		Rip Hewes Stadium	10,000	Dothan	Alabama	1965	Multi-purpose		
436		Withington Stadium	10,000	Jackson	Michigan		Multi-purpose		
437		Golden Wave Stadium	10,000	Tupelo	Mississippi		Football	Tupelo Golden Wave	
438		La Playa Stadium	10,000	Santa Barbara	California		Football, Soccer, Track and Field	Santa Barbara City College	
439		Joliet Memorial Stadium	10,000	Joliet	Illinois	1951	Football, Track and Field	Saint Francis Fighting Saints (NAIA)	
440		Hinchliffe Stadium	10,000	Paterson	New Jersey	1932	Multi-purpose	New Jersey Jackals (Frontier League); New York Cosmos (USL1)	
441		Classic Auto Group Park	10,000	Eastlake	Ohio	2003	Baseball	Lake County Captains (Midwest League)	

== See also ==
- List of American football stadiums by capacity
- List of U.S. baseball stadiums by capacity
- List of soccer stadiums in the United States
- List of NCAA Division I baseball venues
- List of NCAA Division I FBS football stadiums
- List of NCAA Division I FCS football stadiums
- List of current NFL stadiums
- List of current Major League Baseball stadiums
- List of Major League Soccer stadiums
- List of North American stadiums by capacity
- List of stadiums by capacity
- List of indoor arenas in the United States
- Lists of stadiums
