= List of American football stadiums by capacity =

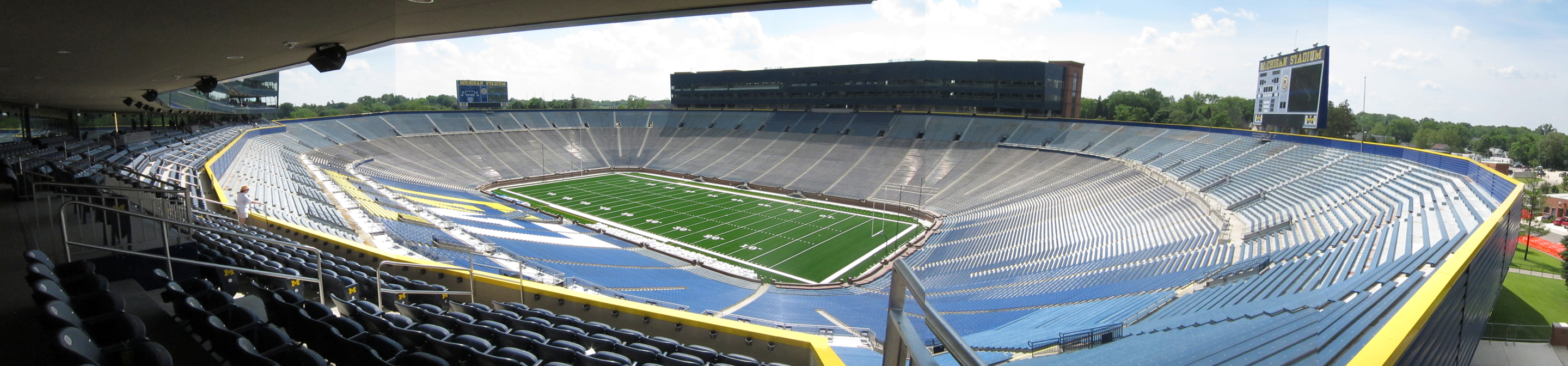
Michigan Stadium is the largest American football stadium by seating capacity.

The following is an incomplete list of American football stadiums in the United States ranked by capacity. The list contains the home stadiums of all 32 professional teams playing in the NFL as well as the largest stadiums used by college football teams in the NCAA. The largest stadium used by a professional team falls at number 15 on the list. Not included are several large stadiums used by teams in the now-defunct NFL Europa, as these were all built for and used mainly for association football, or Rogers Centre, located in Canada (although it does host occasional American football games). Currently American football stadiums with a capacity of 25,000 or more are included.

Stadiums are ordered by seating capacity. This is intended to represent the permanent fixed seating capacity, when the stadium is configured for football. Some stadiums can accommodate larger crowds when configured for other sports, or by using temporary seating or allowing standing-room only attendance.

== Current list ==
Current American football stadiums by capacity
Image	Stadium	Capacity	City	State/Province	Home teams	Refs
	Michigan Stadium	107,601	Ann Arbor	Michigan	Michigan Wolverines	
	Beaver Stadium	106,304	University Park	Pennsylvania	Penn State Nittany Lions	
	Ohio Stadium	102,780	Columbus	Ohio	Ohio State Buckeyes	
	Kyle Field	102,733	College Station	Texas	Texas A&M Aggies	
	Tiger Stadium	102,321	Baton Rouge	Louisiana	LSU Tigers	
	Neyland Stadium	101,915	Knoxville	Tennessee	Tennessee Volunteers	
	Darrell K Royal–Texas Memorial Stadium	100,119	Austin	Texas	Texas Longhorns	
	Bryant–Denny Stadium	100,077	Tuscaloosa	Alabama	Alabama Crimson Tide	
	Sanford Stadium	93,033	Athens	Georgia	Georgia Bulldogs	
	Cotton Bowl	92,100	Dallas	Texas	Used for annual Red River Rivalry game (Texas vs. Oklahoma), State Fair Classic game, First Responder Bowl game (formerly Heart of Dallas Bowl, TicketCity Bowl), and other occasional college football games, soccer games of Atlético Dallas and Dallas Trinity	
	Rose Bowl	89,702	Pasadena	California	UCLA Bruins, the Rose Bowl Game, hosted the BCS National Championship game every fourth year, and will host a College Football semifinal game once every three years	
	Ben Hill Griffin Stadium	88,548	Gainesville	Florida	Florida Gators	
	Jordan-Hare Stadium	88,043	Auburn	Alabama	Auburn Tigers	
	Memorial Stadium	85,458	Lincoln	Nebraska	Nebraska Cornhuskers	
	MetLife Stadium	82,500	East Rutherford	New Jersey	New York Giants and New York Jets	
	Frank Howard Field at Clemson Memorial Stadium	81,500	Clemson	South Carolina	Clemson Tigers	
	Lambeau Field	81,441	Green Bay	Wisconsin	Green Bay Packers	
	Gaylord Family Oklahoma Memorial Stadium	80,126	Norman	Oklahoma	Oklahoma Sooners	
	AT&T Stadium	80,000	Arlington	Texas	Dallas Cowboys, Cotton Bowl Classic game, Big 12 Championship game, Advocare Classic kickoff game, Southwest Classic game, will host a College Football semifinal game once every three years	
	Notre Dame Stadium	77,622	South Bend	Indiana	Notre Dame Fighting Irish	
	Williams-Brice Stadium	77,559	Columbia	South Carolina	South Carolina Gamecocks	
	Los Angeles Memorial Coliseum	77,500	Los Angeles	California	USC Trojans	
	Arrowhead Stadium	76,416	Kansas City	Missouri	Kansas City Chiefs	
	Donald W. Reynolds Razorback Stadium	76,212	Fayetteville	Arkansas	Arkansas Razorbacks	
	Empower Field at Mile High	76,125	Denver	Colorado	Denver Broncos and the Rocky Mountain Showdown (Colorado vs. Colorado State) game	
	Camp Randall Stadium	76,057	Madison	Wisconsin	Wisconsin Badgers	
	Bank of America Stadium	75,037	Charlotte	North Carolina	Carolina Panthers, the Duke's Mayo Bowl game, and the ACC Championship Game	
	Spartan Stadium	74,866	East Lansing	Michigan	Michigan State Spartans	
	Caesars Superdome	73,208	New Orleans	Louisiana	New Orleans Saints, the Sugar Bowl game, the New Orleans Bowl game, the Bayou Classic game, hosted the BCS National Championship game every fourth year and will host a College Football semifinal game once every three years	
	Reliant Stadium	72,220	Houston	Texas	Houston Texans, the Texas Bowl game & the AdvoCare Texas Kickoff	
	Legion Field	71,594	Birmingham	Alabama	No permanent home team, primarily used for the Magic City Classic game; former part-time home for Alabama (full-time for 1987), Auburn, and UAB	
	Mercedes-Benz Stadium	71,000	Atlanta	Georgia	Atlanta Falcons, Chick-fil-A Peach Bowl game, SEC Championship game, Aflac Kickoff Game game, Atlanta United FC	
	M&T Bank Stadium	70,745	Baltimore	Maryland	Baltimore Ravens	
	SoFi Stadium	70,240	Inglewood	California	Los Angeles Rams, Los Angeles Chargers, and the LA Bowl	
	Husky Stadium	70,083	Seattle	Washington	Washington Huskies	
	Kinnick Stadium	69,250	Iowa City	Iowa	Iowa Hawkeyes	
	Raymond James Stadium	69,218	Tampa	Florida	Tampa Bay Buccaneers, South Florida Bulls, Gasparilla Bowl game, and the ReliaQuest Bowl game	
	Nissan Stadium	69,143	Nashville	Tennessee	Tennessee Titans, Tennessee State Tigers, and the Music City Bowl game	
	Lumen Field	68,740	Seattle	Washington	Seattle Seahawks, Seattle Sounders FC, and Seattle Reign FC	
	Levi's Stadium	68,500	Santa Clara	California	San Francisco 49ers, Redbox Bowl game	
	Acrisure Stadium	68,400	Pittsburgh	Pennsylvania	Pittsburgh Steelers, Pittsburgh Panthers	
	EverBank Stadium	67,814	Jacksonville	Florida	Jacksonville Jaguars, the Gator Bowl game, and the annual Florida Gators-Georgia Bulldogs football game - formerly known as The World's Largest Outdoor Cocktail Party	
	Lincoln Financial Field	67,594	Philadelphia	Pennsylvania	Philadelphia Eagles, Temple Owls, Army–Navy Game (in most years)	
	Huntington Bank Field	67,431	Cleveland	Ohio	Cleveland Browns	
	The Dome at America's Center	67,277	St. Louis	Missouri	St. Louis BattleHawks	
	Bobby Bowden Field at Doak Campbell Stadium	67,277	Tallahassee	Florida	Florida State Seminoles	
	Lucas Oil Stadium	67,000	Indianapolis	Indiana	Indianapolis Colts, the Big Ten Championship Game, the Circle City Classic game	
	U.S. Bank Stadium	66,860	Minneapolis	Minnesota	Minnesota Vikings	
	Gillette Stadium	65,878	Foxborough	Massachusetts	New England Patriots, UMass Minutemen (part-time)	
	Lane Stadium	65,632	Blacksburg	Virginia	Virginia Tech Hokies	
	Paycor Stadium	65,515	Cincinnati	Ohio	Cincinnati Bengals, occasionally hosts Cincinnati Bearcats games	
	Allegiant Stadium	65,000	Paradise	Nevada	Las Vegas Raiders, UNLV Rebels and the Las Vegas Bowl game.	
	Ford Field	65,000	Detroit	Michigan	Detroit Lions, MAC Championship Game, the Little Caesars Pizza Bowl game	
	Hard Rock Stadium	64,767	Miami Gardens	Florida	Miami Dolphins, Miami Hurricanes, the Orange Bowl game, hosted the BCS National Championship game every fourth year and will host a College Football semifinal game once every three years	
	Vaught–Hemingway Stadium	64,038	Oxford	Mississippi	Ole Miss Rebels	
	Alamodome	64,000	San Antonio	Texas	UTSA Roadrunners, San Antonio Brahmas, the Alamo Bowl game	
	Northwest Stadium	64,000	Landover	Maryland	Washington Commanders	
	State Farm Stadium	63,400	Glendale	Arizona	Arizona Cardinals, the Fiesta Bowl game, hosted the BCS National Championship game every fourth year, and will host a College Football semifinal game once every three years	
	California Memorial Stadium	62,467	Berkeley	California	California Golden Bears	
	Oakland Coliseum	63,132	Oakland	California	No permanent home football team, primarily used for the Oakland Roots.	
	LaVell Edwards Stadium	62,073	Provo	Utah	BYU Cougars	
	Highmark Stadium	62,000	Orchard Park	New York	Buffalo Bills	
	Faurot Field	57,321	Columbia	Missouri	Missouri Tigers	
	Jack Trice Stadium	61,500	Ames	Iowa	Iowa State Cyclones	
	Scott Stadium	61,500	Charlottesville	Virginia	Virginia Cavaliers	
	Soldier Field	61,500	Chicago	Illinois	Chicago Bears	
	Yale Bowl	61,446	New Haven	Connecticut	Yale Bulldogs	
	Ross–Ade Stadium	61,441	West Lafayette	Indiana	Purdue Boilermakers	
	Kroger Field	61,000	Lexington	Kentucky	Kentucky Wildcats	
	Cardinal Stadium	60,800	Louisville	Kentucky	Louisville Cardinals	
	Gies Memorial Stadium	60,670	Champaign	Illinois	Illinois Fighting Illini	
	Mississippi Veterans Memorial Stadium	60,492	Jackson	Mississippi	Jackson State Tigers	
	Davis Wade Stadium	60,311	Starkville	Mississippi	Mississippi State Bulldogs	
	Galaxy Stadium	60,229	Lubbock	Texas	Texas Tech Red Raiders	
	Camping World Stadium	60,219	Orlando	Florida	No permanent home team, Capital One Bowl game, the Champs Sports Bowl game, the Florida Classic game, and the NFL Pro Bowl. Also hosts two soccer teams, Orlando City SC and the Orlando Pride.	
	Mountaineer Field at Milan Puskar Stadium	60,000	Morgantown	West Virginia	West Virginia Mountaineers	
	Liberty Bowl Memorial Stadium	51,000	Memphis	Tennessee	Memphis Tigers, the Liberty Bowl game, and the Southern Heritage Classic game	
	Carter–Finley Stadium	56,919	Raleigh	North Carolina	NC State Wolfpack	
	Faurot Field	63,609	Columbia	Missouri	Missouri Tigers	
	Sun Devil Stadium	53,599	Tempe	Arizona	Arizona State Sun Devils	
	War Memorial Stadium	54,120	Little Rock	Arkansas	No permanent home team, used for one Arkansas Razorbacks game each season	
	Autzen Stadium	54,000	Eugene	Oregon	Oregon Ducks	
	Sun Devil Stadium	53,599	Tempe	Arizona	Arizona State Sun Devils	
	Memorial Stadium	53,524	Bloomington	Indiana	Indiana Hoosiers	
	Franklin Field	52,958	Philadelphia	Pennsylvania	Penn Quakers, Penn Relays	
	SHI Stadium	52,454	Piscataway	New Jersey	Rutgers Scarlet Knights	
	Boone Pickens Stadium	52,305	Stillwater	Oklahoma	Oklahoma State Cowboys	
	Bobby Dodd Stadium	51,913	Atlanta	Georgia	Georgia Tech Yellow Jackets	
	Rice-Eccles Stadium	51,444	Salt Lake City	Utah	Utah Utes	
	Huntington Bank Stadium	50,805	Minneapolis	Minnesota	Minnesota Golden Gophers	
	Arizona Stadium	50,782	Tucson	Arizona	Arizona Wildcats, the Arizona Bowl game	
	Kenan Memorial Stadium	50,500	Chapel Hill	North Carolina	North Carolina Tar Heels	
	Independence Stadium	50,459	Shreveport	Louisiana	No permanent home team, used for the Independence Bowl game	
	Stanford Stadium	50,424	Stanford	California	Stanford Cardinal	
	Folsom Field	50,183	Boulder	Colorado	Colorado Buffaloes	
	Bill Snyder Family Football Stadium	50,000	Manhattan	Kansas	Kansas State Wildcats	
	Dowdy–Ficklen Stadium	50,000	Greenville	North Carolina	East Carolina Pirates	
	Amon G. Carter Stadium	47,000	Fort Worth	Texas	TCU Horned Frogs and the Armed Forces Bowl game	
	First Community Stadium	47,000	Houston	Texas	Rice Owls, Houston Roughnecks	
	SECU Stadium	46,185	College Park	Maryland	Maryland Terrapins	
	Sun Bowl Stadium	45,971	El Paso	Texas	UTEP Miners and the Sun Bowl game	
	McLane Stadium	45,140	Waco	Texas	Baylor Bears	
	Alumni Stadium	44,500	Chestnut Hill	Massachusetts	Boston College Eagles	
	Acrisure Bounce House	44,206	Orlando	Florida	UCF Knights	
	JMA Wireless Dome	42,784	Syracuse	New York	Syracuse Orange	
	David Booth Kansas Memorial Stadium	41,525	Lawrence	Kansas	Kansas Jayhawks	
	Valley Children's Stadium	40,727	Fresno	California	Fresno State Bulldogs	
	Ladd–Peebles Stadium	40,000	Mobile	Alabama	South Alabama Jaguars, the GoDaddy.com Bowl game, and the Senior Bowl game	
	TDECU Stadium	39,700	Houston	Texas	Houston Cougars, and the Houston Roughnecks	
	Falcon Stadium	39,441	Colorado Springs	Colorado	Air Force Falcons	
	University Stadium	39,224	Albuquerque	New Mexico	New Mexico Lobos and the New Mexico Bowl game	
	Nippert Stadium	38,088	Cincinnati	Ohio	Cincinnati Bearcats	
	Albertsons Stadium	36,387	Boise	Idaho	Boise State Broncos and the Famous Idaho Potato Bowl game	
	Sam Boyd Stadium	36,800	Whitney	Nevada	No permanent home football team	
	Canvas Stadium	36,500	Fort Collins	Colorado	Colorado State Rams.	
	M. M. Roberts Stadium	36,000	Hattiesburg	Mississippi	Southern Miss Golden Eagles	
	Pratt & Whitney Stadium at Rentschler Field	36,000	East Hartford	Connecticut	UConn Huskies	
	Reser Stadium	35,548	Corvallis	Oregon	Oregon State Beavers	
	Kelly/Shorts Stadium	35,127	Mount Pleasant	Michigan	Central Michigan Chippewas	
	Wallace Wade Stadium	35,018	Durham	North Carolina	Duke Blue Devils	
	FirstBank Stadium	35,000	Nashville	Tennessee	Vanderbilt Commodores	
	Snapdragon Stadium	35,000	San Diego	California	San Diego State Aztecs, also hosts San Diego FC and San Diego Wave FC	
	Navy–Marine Corps Memorial Stadium	34,000	Annapolis	Maryland	Navy Midshipmen, the Military Bowl game	
	Gerald J. Ford Stadium	33,200	University Park	Texas	SMU Mustangs	
	Martin Stadium	32,952	Pullman	Washington	Washington State Cougars	
	Truist Field at Wake Forest	31,500	Winston-Salem	North Carolina	Wake Forest Demon Deacons	
	Joan C. Edwards Stadium	30,475	Huntington	West Virginia	Marshall Thundering Herd	
	Veterans Memorial Stadium	30,470	Troy	Alabama	Troy Trojans	
	Centennial Bank Stadium	30,406	Jonesboro	Arkansas	Arkansas State Red Wolves	
	Waldo Stadium	30,200	Kalamazoo	Michigan	Western Michigan Broncos	
	DATCU Stadium	30,100	Denton	Texas	North Texas Mean Green	
	Cajun Field	30,000	Lafayette	Louisiana	Louisiana-Lafayette Ragin' Cajuns	
	Kidd Brewer Stadium	30,000	Boone	North Carolina	Appalachian State Mountaineers	
	Michie Stadium	30,000	West Point	New York	Army Black Knights	
	Flagler Credit Union Stadium	30,000	Boca Raton	Florida	Florida Atlantic Owls	
	InfoCision Stadium–Summa Field	30,000	Akron	Ohio	Akron Zips	
	HA Chapman Stadium	30,000	Tulsa	Oklahoma	Tulsa Golden Hurricane	
	William "Dick" Price Stadium	30,000	Norfolk	Virginia	Norfolk State Spartans	
	Benson Field at Yulman Stadium	30,000	New Orleans	Louisiana	Tulane Green Wave	
	War Memorial Stadium	29,811	Laramie	Wyoming	Wyoming Cowboys	
	Aggie Memorial Stadium	28,853	Las Cruces	New Mexico	New Mexico State Aggies	
	Joe Aillet Stadium	28,562	Ruston	Louisiana	Louisiana Tech Bulldogs	
	UFCU Stadium	28,388	San Marcos	Texas	Texas State Bobcats	
	Huskie Stadium	28,211	DeKalb	Illinois	Northern Illinois Huskies	
	JPS Field at Malone Stadium	27,617	Monroe	Louisiana	Louisiana-Monroe Warhawks	
	Johnny "Red" Floyd Stadium	27,303	Murfreesboro	Tennessee	Middle Tennessee Blue Raiders	
	Mackay Stadium	27,000	Reno	Nevada	Nevada Wolf Pack	
	Dignity Health Sports Park	27,000	Carson	California	No permanent home football team, primarily used for the LA Galaxy	
	ASU Stadium (Alabama)	26,500	Montgomery	Alabama	Alabama State Hornets football	
	Rynearson Stadium	26,188	Ypsilanti	Michigan	Eastern Michigan Eagles	
	Dix Stadium	25,319	Kent	Ohio	Kent State Golden Flashes	
	Harvard Stadium	25,000	Boston	Massachusetts	Harvard Crimson	

== Former or demolished stadiums ==
Defunct American football stadiums by capacity
Image	Stadium	Capacity	City	State/Province	Closed	Home teams	Refs
	John F. Kennedy Stadium	100,000	Philadelphia	Pennsylvania	1992	Philadelphia Eagles; also a frequent venue for the Army–Navy Game	
	Cleveland Stadium	81,000	Cleveland	Ohio	1996	Cleveland Browns	
	Tulane Stadium	80,985	New Orleans	Louisiana	1980	Tulane Green Wave, New Orleans Saints, Sugar Bowl game	
	Silverdome	80,311	Pontiac	Michigan	2006	Detroit Lions, reopened in 2010 for Ultimate Disc games	
	Giants Stadium	80,242	East Rutherford	New Jersey	2010	New York Giants, New York Jets	
	Mile High Stadium	76,273	Denver	Colorado	2002	Denver Broncos	
	Miami Orange Bowl	74,476	Miami	Florida	2008	Miami Hurricanes, Miami Dolphins	
	Tampa Stadium	74,301	Tampa	Florida	1999	Tampa Bay Buccaneers	
	Gator Bowl Stadium	73,227	Jacksonville	Florida	1994	Jacksonville Bulls	
	Ralph Wilson Stadium	71,628	Orchard Park, New York	New York	2025	Buffalo Bills	
	Georgia Dome	71,228	Atlanta	Georgia	2017	Atlanta Falcons, Georgia State Panthers, the Chick-fil-A Bowl game, the SEC Championship Game, and hosted a College Football semifinal game once every three years.	
	San Diego Stadium	70,561	San Diego	California	2019	San Diego Chargers, San Diego State Aztecs, the Holiday Bowl and Poinsettia Bowl games.	
	Candlestick Park	69,732	San Francisco	California	2014	San Francisco 49ers	
	Kingdome	66,000	Seattle	Washington	2000	Seattle Seahawks	
	Texas Stadium	65,675	Irving	Texas	2008	Dallas Cowboys, SMU Mustangs (1979–86)	
	Veterans Stadium	65,386	Philadelphia	Pennsylvania	2004	Philadelphia Eagles, Temple Owls, frequent site for Army-Navy game	
	Anaheim Stadium	64,593	Anaheim	California	1994	Los Angeles Rams	
	Hubert H. Humphrey Metrodome	64,035	Minneapolis	Minnesota	2013	Minnesota Vikings, Minnesota Golden Gophers (1982–2008)	
	Reliant Astrodome	62,439	Houston	Texas	2004	Houston Oilers & Houston Astros, Houston Cougars (1968–1995)	
	Atlanta–Fulton County Stadium	60,606	Atlanta	Georgia	1997	Atlanta Falcons, Peach Bowl (1971–1991)	
	Foxboro Stadium	60,292	Foxboro	Massachusetts	2002	New England Patriots, Boston College Eagles	
	Pitt Stadium	60,190	Pittsburgh	Pennsylvania	1999	Pitt Panthers, Pittsburgh Steelers	
	Riverfront Stadium	59,754	Cincinnati	Ohio	2002	Cincinnati Bengals	
	Kezar Stadium	59,636	San Francisco	California	1971	San Francisco 49ers, Oakland Raiders	
	Three Rivers Stadium	59,000	Pittsburgh	Pennsylvania	2001	Pittsburgh Steelers, Pitt Panthers	
	RCA Dome	57,580	Indianapolis	Indiana	2008	Indianapolis Colts	
	Shea Stadium	57,333	Queens	New York	2008	New York Jets, New York Giants	
	Yankee Stadium	56,936	Bronx	New York	2008	New York Giants	
	Memorial Stadium	56,652	Minneapolis	Minnesota	1982	Minnesota Golden Gophers, one Minnesota Vikings game in 1969	
	Polo Grounds	55,000	New York	New York	1964	New York Giants, New York Titans/Jets	
	Memorial Stadium	53,371	Baltimore	Maryland	2001	Baltimore Colts, Baltimore Stars (USFL), Maryland Terrapins (selected games, 1984–87)	
	County Stadium	53,192	Milwaukee	Wisconsin	2001	Green Bay Packers (part-time home)	
	Tiger Stadium	52,416	Detroit	Michigan	2006	Detroit Tigers, Detroit Lions	
	Stagg Field	50,000	Chicago	Illinois	1957	Chicago Maroons	
	Busch Memorial Stadium	49,676	St. Louis	Missouri	2005	St. Louis Cardinals	
	Metropolitan Stadium	48,446	Bloomington	Minnesota	1985	Minnesota Vikings	
	Cardinal Stadium	47,925	Louisville	Kentucky	1998	Louisville Cardinals	
	War Memorial Stadium	46,500	Buffalo	New York	1973	Buffalo Bills	
	Robert F. Kennedy Memorial Stadium	45,596	Washington	District of Columbia	2019	Washington Redskins	
	Comiskey Park	43,951	Chicago	Illinois	1990	Chicago Cardinals	
	Palmer Stadium	42,000	Princeton	New Jersey	1997	Princeton Tigers	
	Braves Field	40,000	Boston	Massachusetts	1955	Boston Bulldogs	
	Mountaineer Field	38,000	Morgantown	West Virginia	1987	West Virginia Mountaineers	
	Stoll Field/McLean Stadium	37,000	Lexington	Kentucky	1972	Kentucky Wildcats	
	Municipal Stadium	35,561	Kansas City	Missouri	1976	Kansas City Chiefs	
	Forbes Field	35,000	Pittsburgh	Pennsylvania	1970	Pittsburgh Steelers, Pitt Panthers	
	Clyde Williams Stadium	35,000	Ames	Iowa	1975	Iowa State Cyclones	
	Balboa Stadium	34,000	San Diego	California	1966	San Diego Chargers	
	Shibe Park	33,608	Philadelphia	Pennsylvania	1970	Philadelphia Eagles	
	Sonny Lubick Field at Hughes Stadium	32,500	Fort Collins	Colorado	2017	Colorado State Rams	
	Ebbets Field	32,000	Brooklyn	New York	1960	Brooklyn Dodgers	
	Robertson Stadium	32,000	Houston	Texas	2012	Houston Cougars	
	Rutgers Stadium	31,219	Piscataway	New Jersey	1993	Rutgers Scarlet Knights	
	Rubber Bowl	31,000	Akron	Ohio	2008	Akron Zips	
	Sportsman's Park	30,500	St. Louis	Missouri	1965	St. Louis Cardinals	
	Cartier Field	30,000	Notre Dame	Indiana	1930	Notre Dame Fighting Irish	
	DU Stadium	30,000	Denver	Colorado	1960	Denver Pioneers	
	Fouts Field	30,000	Denton	Texas	2010	North Texas Mean Green	
	New Beaver Field	30,000	State College	Pennsylvania	1960	Penn State Nittany Lions	

== See also ==
- List of current NFL stadiums
- List of NCAA Division I FBS football stadiums
- List of NCAA Division I FCS football stadiums
- List of U.S. stadiums by capacity
- List of American baseball stadiums by capacity
- List of North American stadiums by capacity
- List of stadiums by capacity
- List of football (soccer) stadiums by capacity
- List of rugby league stadiums by capacity
- List of rugby union stadiums by capacity
- Lists of stadiums
