= List of NCAA Division I FBS football stadiums =

The NCAA Division I Football Bowl Subdivision (FBS) is the highest level of college football in the United States. The FBS consists of the largest schools in the National Collegiate Athletic Association (NCAA). As of the 2025 season, there are 10 conferences which represent 136 schools and two independent schools, for a total of 138 schools in the FBS.

The stadiums that serve as the home venue for FBS teams include most of the largest stadiums in the United States. FBS football stadiums account for fourteen of the twenty-five largest stadiums in the world by capacity, and eight of the eleven stadiums with a permanent capacity of over 100,000.

Conference affiliations reflect those in the upcoming 2026 season.

== Current stadiums ==
In addition to the following list of FBS football stadiums, there is also a List of NCAA Division I FBS football programs.

Image	Stadium	City	State	Team	Conference	Capacity	Record (Note: Largest football crowd. Larger attendance records may exist for other configurations of the stadium. Also, a few stadiums now have lower football capacity than in the past; one example is California Memorial Stadium, whose capacity dropped by more than 9,000 in its most recent renovation.)	Built	Expanded (Note: Year of most recent completed stadium expansion/major upgrade.)	Surface
	Acrisure Bounce House	Orlando	FL	UCF	Big 12	44,206	48,453 (October 17, 2009 vs. Miami (FL))	2007		Grass
	Acrisure Stadium	Pittsburgh	PA	Pittsburgh	ACC	68,400 (Note: Acrisure Stadium expandable to 69,050.)	70,622 (September 1, 2022 vs. West Virginia)	2001		Grass
	Aggie Memorial Stadium	Las Cruces	NM	New Mexico State	CUSA	28,853	32,993 (September 26, 1998 vs. UTEP)	1978	2005	S5-M Synthetic Turf
	Alamodome	San Antonio	TX	UTSA	American	64,000	56,743 (September 3, 2011 vs. Northeastern State)	1993		SportField
	Husky Stadium	Seattle	WA	Washington	Big Ten	70,083	76,125 (September 23, 1995 vs. Army)	1920	2013	FieldTurf
	Albertsons Stadium	Boise	ID	Boise State	Pac-12	36,387	36,864 (October 12, 2019 vs. Hawaii)	1970	2012	FieldTurf
	Allegacy Federal Credit Union Stadium	Winston-Salem	NC	Wake Forest	ACC	31,500	37,623 (November 13, 2004 vs. North Carolina)	1968	2007	FieldTurf
	Allegiant Stadium	Paradise	NV	UNLV	Mountain West	65,000	56,511 (December 3, 2021 Pac-12 Championship Oregon vs. Utah)	2020		FieldTurf
	Allen E. Paulson Stadium	Statesboro	GA	Georgia Southern	Sun Belt	25,000	26,483 (September 30, 2023 vs. Coastal Carolina Chanticleers)	1984	2014	FieldTurf Vertex Prestige with CoolPlay
	Alumni Stadium	Chestnut Hill	MA	Boston College	ACC	44,500	44,500 (multiple times)	1957	1995	AstroTurf
	Amon G. Carter Stadium	Fort Worth	TX	TCU	Big 12	47,000	50,307 (November 14, 2009 vs. Utah)	1929	2012	Grass
	Arthur L. Williams Stadium	Lynchburg	VA	Liberty	CUSA	25,000	24,012 (October 22, 2022 vs. BYU)	1989	2018	FieldTurf
	Autzen Stadium	Eugene	OR	Oregon	Big Ten	54,000 (standing room to 60,000)	60,129 (October 12, 2024 vs. Ohio State)	1967	2002	FieldTurf
	Dowdy–Ficklen Stadium	Greenville	NC	East Carolina	American	51,000	51,711 (September 3, 2022 vs. NC State)	1963	2019	Tifton 419 Hybrid Bermuda
	Beaver Stadium	University Park	PA	Penn State	Big Ten	106,572	111,030 (November 2, 2024 vs. Ohio State)	1959	2001, 2024-2027	Natural grass
	Yulman Stadium	New Orleans	LA	Tulane	American	30,000	30,118 (December 3, 2022 vs. UCF)	2014		Act Global UBU Speed Series S5-M
	Bill Snyder Family Football Stadium	Manhattan	KS	Kansas State	Big 12	50,000	53,811 (November 11, 2000 vs. Nebraska)	1968	2005	Synthetic turf
	Blaik Field at Michie Stadium	West Point	NY	Army	American	30,000	42,765 (October 2, 1971 vs. Missouri)	1924	2001	Field turf
	Bobby Bowden Field at Doak S. Campbell Stadium	Tallahassee	FL	Florida State	ACC	67,277	84,409 (November 2, 2013 vs. Miami (FL))	1950	2003	Grass
	Bobby Dodd Stadium at Hyundai Field	Atlanta	GA	Georgia Tech	ACC	51,913	60,316 (1973 vs. Georgia)	1913	2003	Legion NXT turf
	Boone Pickens Stadium	Stillwater	OK	Oklahoma State	Big 12	52,305	60,218 (November 23, 2013 vs. Baylor)	1919	2005	Astroturf 3D Decade
	Bridgeforth Stadium	Harrisonburg	VA	James Madison	Sun Belt	24,877	26,159 (October 22, 2022 vs. Marshall)	1975	2011	FieldTurf
	Brigham Field at Huskie Stadium	DeKalb	IL	NIU	Mountain West	28,211	28,221 (October 18, 2003 vs. Western Michigan)	1965	1995	FieldTurf
	Brooks Field at Wallace Wade Stadium	Durham	NC	Duke	ACC	35,018	57,500 (November 19, 1949 vs. North Carolina)	1929	2016	Latitude 36 Bermuda Grass
	Brooks Stadium	Conway	SC	Coastal Carolina	Sun Belt	21,000	22,217 (September 6, 2025 vs. Charleston Southern)	2003	2018	Shaw Power Blade HD Turf
	Burgess–Snow Field at AmFirst Stadium	Jacksonville	AL	Jacksonville State	CUSA	22,500	23,944 (September 23, 2017 vs. Liberty)	1947	2010	ProGrass
	Cajun Field	Lafayette	LA	Louisiana	Sun Belt	30,000	41,357 (September 5, 2009 vs. Southern)	1971	2015	ProGrass
	California Memorial Stadium	Berkeley	CA	California	ACC	62,467	83,000 (September 27, 1947 vs. Navy; November 22, 1952 vs. Stanford)	1923	2012	FieldTurf
	Camp Randall Stadium	Madison	WI	Wisconsin	Big Ten	76,057	83,184 (November 12, 2005 vs. Iowa)	1917	2005	FieldTurf
	Carl Smith Center, Home of David A. Harrison III Field at Scott Stadium	Charlottesville (Note: The stadium has a Charlottesville mailing address, but is physically located in Albemarle County, which encloses but does not include the city of Charlottesville.)	VA	Virginia	ACC	61,500	64,947 (August 30, 2008 vs. USC)	1931	2000	Grass
	Carlisle-Faulkner Field at M.M. Roberts Stadium	Hattiesburg	MS	Southern Miss	Sun Belt	36,000	36,641 (September 5, 2016 vs. Mississippi State)	1932	2008	Shaw Sports Momentum Turf
	Casino Del Sol Stadium	Tucson	AZ	Arizona	Big 12	50,782	59,920 (November 23, 1996 vs. Arizona State)	1928	1988	FieldTurf
	CEFCU Stadium	San Jose	CA	San Jose State	Mountain West	21,520	31,681 (August 23, 2003 vs. Grambling State)	1933	1985	AstroTurf
	Centennial Bank Stadium	Jonesboro	AR	Arkansas State	Sun Belt	30,406	31,243 (December 1, 2012 vs. Middle Tennessee)	1974	2002	ProGreen
	Center Parc Stadium	Atlanta	GA	Georgia State	Sun Belt	24,333	24,333	1996 (as Centennial Olympic Stadium)	2017 (conversion from Turner Field)	Artificial turf
	Clarence T. C. Ching Athletics Complex	Honolulu	HI	Hawaiʻi	Mountain West	15,194	15,194 (multiple times)	2015	2021; expanded 2023	Artificial turf
	Darrell K Royal–Texas Memorial Stadium	Austin	TX	Texas	SEC	100,119	105,213 (September 10, 2022 vs. Alabama)	1924	2009	FieldTurf
	DATCU Stadium	Denton	TX	North Texas	American	30,100	31,386 (October 10, 2025 vs. USF)	2011	N/A	PowerBlade Artificial Turf
	David Booth Kansas Memorial Stadium	Lawrence	KS	Kansas	Big 12	41,525	52,530 (September 1, 2009 vs. Northern Colorado)	1921	1999	FieldTurf
	Davis Wade Stadium at Scott Field	Mississippi State	MS	Mississippi State	SEC	60,311	62,945 (October 11, 2014 vs. Auburn)	1914	2014	Prescription Athletic Turf (Tifway 419 Bermuda Grass)
	Delaware Stadium	Newark	DE	Delaware	CUSA	18,500	23,619 (October 27. 1973 vs. Temple)	1952		FieldTurf
	Dix Stadium	Kent	OH	Kent State	MAC	25,319	27,363 (November 10, 1973 vs. Miami (OH))	1969	2008	FieldTurf
	Donald W. Reynolds Razorback Stadium, Frank Broyles Field	Fayetteville	AR	Arkansas	SEC	76,212	82,808 (September 25, 2010 vs. Alabama)	1938	2006	PowerBlade HP
	Doyt L. Perry Stadium	Bowling Green	OH	Bowling Green	MAC	33,572	33,527 (October 8, 1983 vs. Toledo)	1966		FieldTurf
	Elliott T. Bowers Stadium	Huntsville	TX	Sam Houston	CUSA	14,000	16,148 (October 24, 1994 vs. Alcorn State)	1986		Real Grass Pro Artificial Turf
	Falcon Stadium	USAF Academy	CO	Air Force	Mountain West	39,441	56,409 (October 19, 2002 vs. Notre Dame)	1962		FieldTurf
	Fargodome	Fargo	ND	North Dakota State	Mountain West	18,700	19,108 (October 12, 2013 vs. Missouri State)	1992		FieldTurf
	Faurot Field at Memorial Stadium	Columbia	MO	Missouri	SEC	65,000	75,298 (October 4, 1980 vs. Penn State)	1926	2026	FieldTurf
	Fifth Third Stadium	Kennesaw	GA	Kennesaw State	CUSA	10,200	9,506 (September 12, 2015 vs. Edward Waters)	2010	(Note: Kennesaw State has made plans to expand the stadium, but the university has not announced a timeline for an expansion as of yet.)	PlayMaster hybrid
	FirstBank Stadium	Nashville	TN	Vanderbilt	SEC	40,350 (Note: Temporary capacity in 2023 during renovations.)	41,448	1922	2012	Shaw Sports Legion 46
	Folsom Field	Boulder	CO	Colorado	Big 12	50,183	54,972 (September 3, 2005 vs. Colorado State)	1924	2003	AstroTurf’s RootZone 3D3
	Frank Howard Field at Clemson Memorial Stadium	Clemson	SC	Clemson	ACC	81,500	86,092 (October 10, 1999 vs. Florida State)	1942	2006	Grass
	Mountain America Stadium	Tempe	AZ	Arizona State	Big 12	53,599	74,963 (November 9, 1996 vs. California)	1958	2016	Bermuda Grass
	Fred C. Yager Stadium	Oxford	OH	Miami	MAC	30,087	30,087 (October 2, 1999 vs. Marshall)	1983	2005	FieldTurf
	Galaxy Stadium	Lubbock	TX	Texas Tech	Big 12	60,229	61,836 (November 2, 2013 vs. Oklahoma State)	1947	2024	Matrix Artificial Turf
	Gaylord Family Oklahoma Memorial Stadium	Norman	OK	Oklahoma	SEC	80,126	88,308 (November 11, 2017 vs. Texas Christian University)	1923	2019	Grass
	Gerald J. Ford Stadium	Dallas	TX	SMU	ACC	33,200	35,481 (September 24, 2010 vs. TCU)	2000		Grass
	Gies Memorial Stadium	Champaign	IL	Illinois	Big Ten	60,670	78,297 (September 8, 1984 vs. Missouri)	1923	2011	FieldTurf
	Glass Bowl	Toledo	OH	Toledo	MAC	26,038	36,852 (October 27, 2001 vs. Navy)	1937	1990	FieldTurf
	Hancock Whitney Stadium	Mobile	AL	South Alabama	Sun Belt	25,450	25,540 (October 20, 2022 vs. Troy)	2020		FieldTurf
	Hard Rock Stadium	Miami Gardens	FL	Miami	ACC	64,767	80,120 (January 7, 2013 2013 BCS National Championship Game, Alabama vs. Notre Dame)	1987	2016	Platinum TE Paspalum
	Hornet Stadium	Sacramento	CA	Sacramento State	MAC	21,195	20,993 (September 18, 1999 vs. UC Davis)	1969	1992	SprinTurf
	Houchens Industries–L. T. Smith Stadium at Jimmy Feix Field	Bowling Green	KY	Western Kentucky	CUSA	22,113	25,171 (September 25, 2021 vs. Indiana)	1968	2008	FieldTurf
	Howard Schnellenberger Field at Flagler Credit Union Stadium	Boca Raton	FL	Florida Atlantic	American	30,000	29,103 (October 15, 2011 vs. Western Kentucky)	2011		Grass
	Huntington Bank Stadium	Minneapolis	MN	Minnesota	Big Ten	50,805	54,147 (September 3, 2015 vs. TCU)	2009		FieldTurf
	InfoCision Stadium–Summa Field	Akron	OH	Akron	MAC	30,000	27,881	2009		ProGrass Artificial Turf
	JMA Wireless Dome	Syracuse	NY	Syracuse	ACC	42,784	50,564 (September 20, 1980 vs. Miami (OH))	1980	2022	FieldTurf
	Jack Trice Stadium	Ames	IA	Iowa State	Big 12	61,500	61,500 (multiple times)	1975	2015	Grass
	Jim Wacker Field at UFCU Stadium	San Marcos	TX	Texas State	Pac-12	28,388	33,006 (September 8, 2012 vs. Texas Tech)	1981	2012	FieldTurf Duraspine Pro
	Joan C. Edwards Stadium	Huntington	WV	Marshall	Sun Belt	30,475	41,382 (September 10, 2010 vs. West Virginia)	1991	2000	AstroTurf
	Joe Aillet Stadium	Ruston	LA	Louisiana Tech	Sun Belt	28,562	28,714 (September 13, 1997 vs. Northeast Louisiana)	1968	2017	FieldTurf
	John O'Quinn Field at Space City Financial Stadium	Houston	TX	Houston	Big 12	39,700	42,159 (November 14, 2015 vs. Memphis)	2014		Act Global UBU Speed Series S5-M Synthetic Turf
	Johnny "Red" Floyd Stadium	Murfreesboro	TN	Middle Tennessee	CUSA	27,303	30,502 (September 10, 2011) vs. Georgia Tech)	1933	1998	Synthetic turf
	Jonah Field at War Memorial Stadium	Laramie	WY	Wyoming	Mountain West	29,811	34,745 (October 18, 1997 vs. Colorado State)	1950	2010	FieldTurf
	Kramer/Deromedi Field at Kelly/Shorts Stadium	Mount Pleasant	MI	Central Michigan	MAC	35,127	35,127 (September 8, 2012 vs. Michigan State)	1972	1997	FieldTurf
	Kenan Stadium	Chapel Hill	NC	North Carolina	ACC	50,500	62,000 (multiple times)	1927	2011	AstroTurf
	Kidd Brewer Stadium	Boone	NC	Appalachian State	Sun Belt	40,168	40,168 (September 3, 2022 vs. North Carolina)	1962	2017	FieldTurf
	Kinnick Stadium	Iowa City	IA	Iowa	Big Ten	69,250	70,585 (multiple times)	1929	2006	FieldTurf
	Kornblau Field at S.B. Ballard Stadium	Norfolk	VA	Old Dominion	Sun Belt	21,944	22,208 (September 14, 2024 vs. Virginia Tech)	1936 (as Foreman Field)	2019 (rebuilt)	AstroTurf GameDay Grass 3D
	Kroger Field at C.M. Newton Grounds	Lexington	KY	Kentucky	SEC	61,000	71,024 (October 20, 2007 vs. Florida)	1973	2015	Artificial turf
	Kyle Field	College Station	TX	Texas A&M	SEC	102,733	110,633 (October 11, 2014 vs. Ole Miss)	1927	2015	Grass
	L&N Federal Credit Union Stadium	Louisville	KY	Louisville	ACC	60,800	58,187 (September 17, 2016 vs. Florida State)	1998	2018	FieldTurf
	Lane Stadium/Worsham Field	Blacksburg	VA	Virginia Tech	ACC	65,632	66,233 (multiple times)	1965	2005	Grass
	LaVell Edwards Stadium	Provo	UT	BYU	Big 12	62,073	66,247 (October 16, 1993 vs. Notre Dame)	1964	1982	Grass
	Lincoln Financial Field	Philadelphia	PA	Temple	American	67,594	69,176 (September 5, 2015 vs. Penn State)	2003		Desso GrassMaster
	Los Angeles Memorial Coliseum	Los Angeles	CA	USC	Big Ten	77,500	105,236 (1947, USC vs. Notre Dame)	1923	2008	Grass
	Mackay Stadium	Reno	NV	Nevada	Mountain West	27,000	33,391 (October 28, 1995 vs. UNLV)	1966	2016	FieldTurf
	Malone Stadium	Monroe	LA	Louisiana-Monroe	Sun Belt	27,617	31,175 (September 21, 2012 vs. Baylor)	1978	1993	FieldTurf
	Martin Stadium	Pullman	WA	Washington State	Pac-12	32,952	40,306 (November 15, 1997 vs. Stanford)	1972	2000	FieldTurf
	McColl–Richardson Field at Jerry Richardson Stadium	Charlotte	NC	Charlotte	American	15,314	19,151 (September 8, 2018 vs. Appalachian State)	2013		Matrix Artificial Turf
	McLane Stadium	Waco	TX	Baylor	Big 12	45,140	50,223 (November 16, 2019 vs. Oklahoma)	2014		Matrix Artificial Turf
	Merchants Bank Field at Memorial Stadium	Bloomington	IN	Indiana	Big Ten	53,524	56,223 (November 22, 1969 vs. Purdue)	1960	2010	Matrix Artificial Turf
	Memorial Stadium, Tom Osborne Field	Lincoln	NE	Nebraska	Big Ten	85,458	91,585 (September 20, 2014 vs. Miami (FL))	1923	2017 (1,000 seats widened, reducing capacity)	FieldTurf
	Merlin Olsen Field at Maverik Stadium	Logan	UT	Utah State	Pac-12	25,513	33,119 (October 4, 1996 vs. BYU)	1968	1980	AstroTurf GameDay Grass 3D60 Extreme
	Michigan Stadium	Ann Arbor	MI	Michigan	Big Ten	107,601	115,109 (September 7, 2013 vs. Notre Dame)	1927	2015	FieldTurf Duraspine
	Mountaineer Field at Milan Puskar Stadium	Morgantown	WV	West Virginia	Big 12	60,000	70,222 (November 20, 1993 vs. Miami (FL))	1980	2004	FieldTurf
	Navy–Marine Corps Memorial Stadium	Annapolis	MD	Navy	American	34,000	38,792 (October 7, 2017 vs. Air Force)	1959	2005	FieldTurf Revolution
	Neyland Stadium	Knoxville	TN	Tennessee	SEC	101,915	109,061 (September 18, 2004 vs. Florida)	1921	2010	Grass
	Nippert Stadium	Cincinnati	OH	Cincinnati	Big 12	38,088	40,140 (October 24, 2015 vs. UConn)	1915	2015	UBU Sports Speed M6-M
	Notre Dame Stadium	Notre Dame	IN	Notre Dame	Independent	77,622	77,622 (multiple times)	1930	2017	FieldTurf
	Ohio Stadium	Columbus	OH	Ohio State	Big Ten	102,780	110,045 (November 26, 2016 vs. Michigan)	1922	2014	FieldTurf
	Pat Dye Field at Jordan–Hare Stadium	Auburn	AL	Auburn	SEC	88,043	88,043 (multiple times) (Note: Most recent: November 29, 2025 vs. Alabama.)	1939	2004	Grass
	Frank Solich Field at Peden Stadium	Athens	OH	Ohio	MAC	24,000	26,740 (September 6, 2025 vs. West Virginia University)	1929	2001	FieldTurf
	Pitbull Stadium	Miami (Note: The stadium and the main FIU campus have a Miami mailing address, but both are located in unincorporated Miami-Dade County.)	FL	FIU	CUSA	20,000	22,682 (October 1, 2011 vs. Duke)	1995	2012	FieldTurf
	Pratt & Whitney Stadium at Rentschler Field	East Hartford	CT	UConn	Independent	38,000	42,704 (September 21, 2013 vs. #15 Michigan)	2003		Kentucky Bluegrass
	Protective Stadium	Birmingham	AL	UAB	American	47,100	37,167 (October 2, 2021 vs. Liberty)	2021		Artificial turf
	Raymond James Stadium	Tampa	FL	South Florida	American	65,857	71,921 (January 28, 2001, Super Bowl XXXV, Baltimore Ravens vs. New York Giants)	1998		Grass
	Reser Stadium	Corvallis	OR	Oregon State	Pac-12	35,548	47,249 (November 24, 2012 vs. Oregon)	1953	2005	FieldTurf
	First Community Stadium	Houston	TX	Rice	American	47,000	73,000 (multiple times)	1950		AstroTurf 3D60H Synthetic Turf
	Rice–Eccles Stadium	Salt Lake City	UT	Utah	Big 12	51,444	52,724 (November 20, 2021 vs. Oregon)	1998	2014	FieldTurf CoolPlay
	Robert W. Plaster Stadium	Springfield	MO	Missouri State	CUSA	17,500	18,386 (September 13, 2014 vs. North Dakota)	1941	2014	FieldTurf
	Rose Bowl Stadium	Pasadena	CA	UCLA	Big Ten	89,702	106,869 (January 1, 1973, Rose Bowl, USC vs. Ohio State)	1921–1922	1949	Grass
	Ross–Ade Stadium	West Lafayette	IN	Purdue	Big Ten	61,441	71,629 (November 22, 1980 vs. Indiana)	1924	2023	Grass
	Ryan Field	Evanston	IL	Northwestern	Big Ten	35,000	N/A	2026		FieldTurf
	Rynearson Stadium	Ypsilanti	MI	Eastern Michigan	MAC	26,188	26,188 (November 28, 2008 vs. Central Michigan)	1969	1992	FieldTurf
	Saban Field at Bryant–Denny Stadium	Tuscaloosa	AL	Alabama	SEC	100,077	101,821 (multiple times)	1929	2010	Grass
	Sanford Stadium	Athens	GA	Georgia	SEC	93,033	93,246 (2019 Vs. Notre Dame)	1929	2004	Grass
	Scheumann Stadium	Muncie	IN	Ball State	MAC	22,500	23,861	1967	2007	FieldTurf
	SECU Stadium	College Park	MD	Maryland	Big Ten	46,185	58,973 (November 1, 1975 vs. Penn State)	1950	2009	FieldTurf
	SHI Stadium	Piscataway	NJ	Rutgers	Big Ten	52,454	53,774 (September 13, 2014 vs. Penn State)	1994	2009	FieldTurf
	Simmons Bank Liberty Stadium	Memphis	TN	Memphis	American	50,000	65,885 (November 9, 1996 vs. Tennessee)	1965	1987	AstroTurf
	Skelly Field at H. A. Chapman Stadium	Tulsa	OK	Tulsa	American	30,000	47,350 (September 26, 1987 vs. Oklahoma)	1930	2008 (Capacity reduced to 30,000)	FieldTurf
	Snapdragon Stadium	San Diego	CA	San Diego State	Pac-12	35,000	34,046	2022		Grass
	Sonny Lubick Field at Canvas Stadium	Fort Collins	CO	Colorado State	Pac-12	41,000	41,000	2017		Shaw Sports Artificial Turf
	Spartan Stadium	East Lansing	MI	Michigan State	Big Ten	74,866	80,401 (September 22, 1990 vs. Notre Dame)	1923	2005	Grass
	Stanford Stadium	Stanford	CA	Stanford	ACC	50,424	51,607 (October 9, 2010 vs. USC)	1921	2006	Grass
	Steve Spurrier-Florida Field at Ben Hill Griffin Stadium	Gainesville	FL	Florida	SEC	88,548	90,916 (November 28, 2015 vs. Florida State)	1930	2003	Grass
	Sun Bowl Stadium	El Paso	TX	UTEP	Mountain West	51,500	53,415 (September 6, 2008 vs. Texas)	1963	1981	FieldTurf
	Tiger Stadium	Baton Rouge	LA	LSU	SEC	102,321	102,321 (multiple times) (Note: Most recent: November 8, 2014 vs. Alabama.)	1924	2014	Grass
	UB Stadium	Buffalo	NY	Buffalo	MAC	25,013	29,795 (August 31, 2006 vs. Temple)	1993		A-Turf Titan
	University Stadium	Albuquerque	NM	New Mexico	Mountain West	39,224	44,760 (September 17, 2005 vs. New Mexico State)	1960	2007	FieldTurf
	Valley Children's Stadium	Fresno	CA	Fresno State	Pac-12	40,727	42,881 (multiple times)	1980	1992	FieldTurf
	Vaught–Hemingway Stadium at Hollingsworth Field	University (Note: The stadium and the Ole Miss campus lie outside the Oxford city limits in unincorporated Lafayette County. The US Census Bureau designates the campus as "University, Mississippi".)	MS	Mississippi	SEC	64,038	67,505 (September 21, 2024 vs. Georgia Southern)	1915	2016	Grass
	Veterans Memorial Stadium at Larry Blakeney Field	Troy	AL	Troy	Sun Belt	30,470	31,010 (November 12, 2022 vs. Army)	1950	2003 & 2018	ProGrass
	Waldo Stadium	Kalamazoo	MI	Western Michigan	MAC	36,361	36,361 (September 16, 2000 vs. Indiana State)	1939	2003	FieldTurf
	Warren McGuirk Alumni Stadium	Hadley (Note: Mailing address is Amherst.)	MA	UMass	MAC	17,000 (expandable to 21,430)	20,000 (November 25, 1972 vs. Boston College)	1965	2014	FieldTurf
	Wayne Day Family Field at Carter–Finley Stadium	Raleigh	NC	NC State	ACC	56,919	57,583 (multiple times)	1966	2006	Tifway 419 Bermuda Grass
	Williams–Brice Stadium	Columbia	SC	South Carolina	SEC	77,559	85,199 (October 6, 2012 vs. Georgia)	1934	1996	Grass

== Future stadiums ==
This list includes the following:

- Stadiums either under construction or confirmed to be built in the future.
- Existing stadiums of teams either (1) transitioning to FBS and not yet football members of FBS conferences, or (2) returning to FBS football.

Here, conference affiliations are those expected to be in effect when the stadium becomes an FBS venue, whether by opening, reopening, or a school's entry into provisional or full FBS membership.

Stadium	City	State	Team	Conference	Capacity	Record^{1}	Built	Expanded^{2}	Surface
Future South Florida on-campus stadium	Tampa	FL	South Florida	American	35,000	—N/a	2027 (expected)	N/A	TBD
New Aloha Stadium	Honolulu	HI	Hawaiʻi	Mountain West	31,000	—N/a	2029 (expected)	N/A	TBD

== See also ==
- List of NCAA Division I FBS football programs
- List of NCAA Division I FCS football stadiums
- List of current National Football League stadiums
- List of American football stadiums by capacity
- List of U.S. stadiums by capacity
- List of North American stadiums by capacity
- List of stadiums by capacity
- Lists of stadiums

== Notes ==
Capacity

Record

Other
