= Joy and Ralph Ellis Stadium =

American football and soccer stadium in Irving, Texas

Coordinates: 32.8067°N 96.9375°W

The Joy and Ralph Ellis Stadium is a stadium at 600 East 6th Street, Irving, Texas, United States. It is used for American football and association football (soccer) matches, and also sometimes for athletics. The stadium opened in 1956 and has a capacity of 12,500.

Up until October 28, 2016, it was named Irving Schools Stadium.

Joy and Ralph Ellis Stadium is among the largest high school football stadiums by capacity in Texas:
