= Alumni Stadium =

American college football stadium in Massachusetts

- Alumni

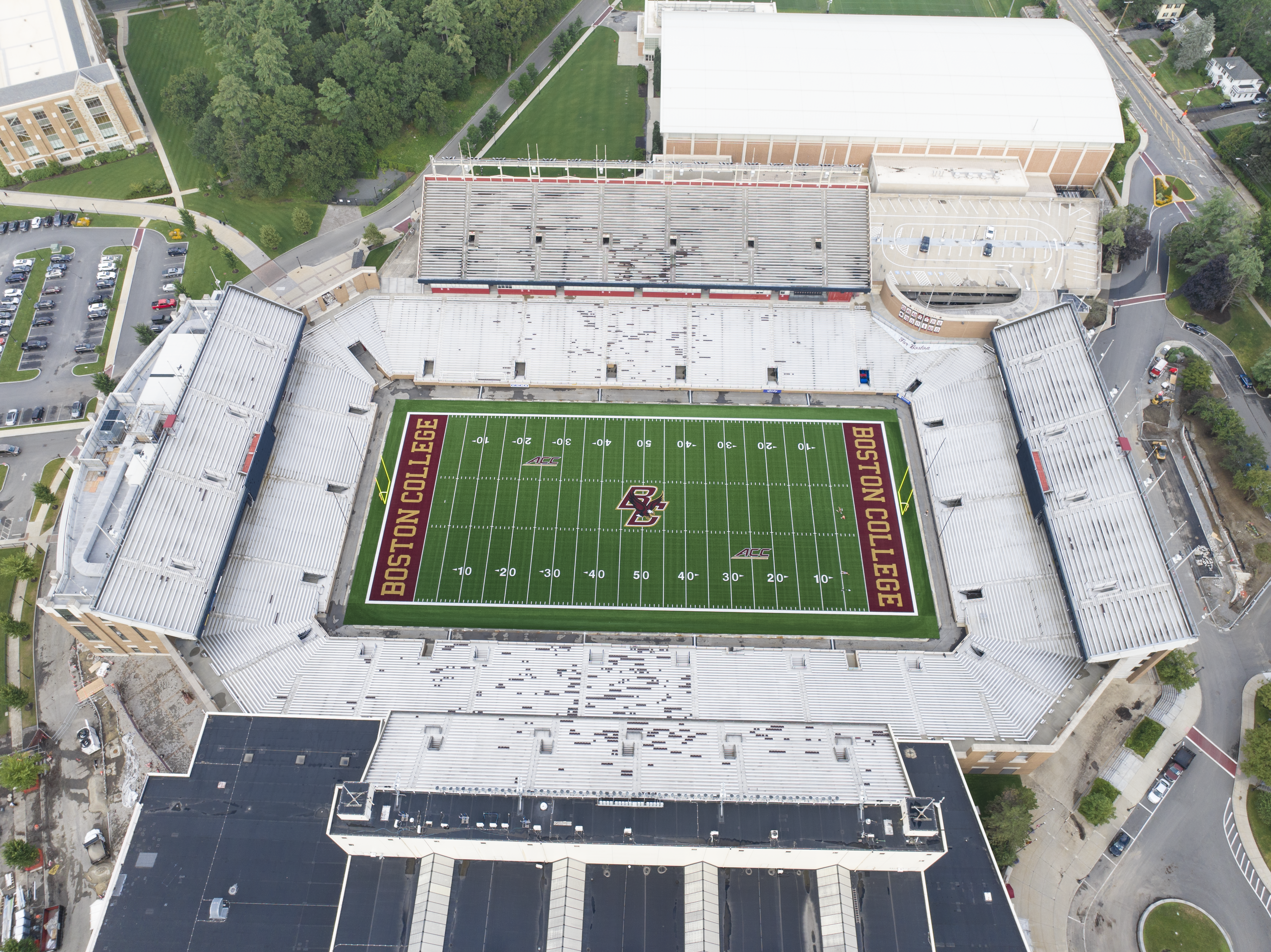
- The stadium from above in 2023

- Location in Massachusetts Location in the United States
- Address: 140 Commonwealth Avenue; Chestnut Hill, MA; United States
- Coordinates: 42°20′6″N 71°09′59″W
- Owner: Boston College
- Operator: Boston College
- Capacity: 44,500 (1995–present) Former capacity: List: 32,000 (1971–1994); 26,000 (1957–1970)
- Surface: AstroTurf GameDay Grass 3D60H (2012–present) Former surfaces: List: 1957–1969 Grass; 1970–2003 AstroTurf; 2004–2012 FieldTurf

Construction
- Groundbreaking: April 15, 1957
- Opened: September 21, 1957; 68 years ago
- Renovated: 1995
- Expanded: 1971, 1995
- Cost: US$350,000 ($4.01 million in 2025 dollars)
- Architect: M. A. Dyer Company
- General contractor: Bowen Construction Co.

Tenants
- Boston College Eagles football (NCAA) (1957–present); Boston Patriots (AFL) (1969)

Website
- bceagles.com/alumni-stadium

Alumni Stadium is a college football stadium on the lower campus of Boston College in Chestnut Hill, Massachusetts. It is about 6 miles (9.7 km) west of downtown Boston, just inside the Boston city limits near the border with Newton. It is the home of the Boston College Eagles football program and also hosts lacrosse games on occasion. Its seating capacity is 44,500.

== History ==
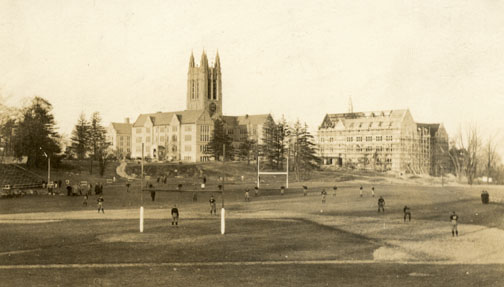
Alumni Field, the precursor to Alumni Stadium, c. 1920

Alumni Field, Boston College's first stadium, opened in 1915 and was just south of Gasson Quadrangle on the site of the present Stokes Hall, an academic building for the humanities that opened in 2013. Before the building of Stokes, the area was known as The Dustbowl, a nickname that originated as a description of Alumni Field in the years when it was used as a practice field, a baseball diamond, and a running track. Formally dedicated "as a memorial to the boys that were" on October 30, 1915, Alumni Field and its "maroon goal-posts on a field of green" were hailed in that evening's edition of the Boston Saturday Evening Transcript as "one of the sights in Boston". The original grandstands, which could accommodate 2,200 spectators in 1915, were enlarged over the subsequent years to 25,000. Nonetheless, Alumni Field often proved too small for BC football games, which were frequently held at Fenway Park, and later Braves Field, beginning in the 1930s.

On September 21, 1957, Alumni Stadium opened on Boston College's lower campus. The new stadium incorporated a football field encircled by a regulation track with a seating capacity of 26,000. The dedication game, a match-up with the Midshipmen of the U.S. Naval Academy, was orchestrated with the help of Boston College benefactor and then U.S. Senator John F. Kennedy. Kennedy, who received his honorary degree at Commencement Exercises in Alumni Field the previous year, returned to Alumni Stadium on a number of occasions, including to give the 1963 Convocation Address, one of his last public appearances prior to his assassination on November 22, 1963.

Alumni Stadium in its present form has hosted 42 sellout crowds of 44,500 or greater, most recently on November 1, 2025 against Notre Dame.

=== Renovations ===
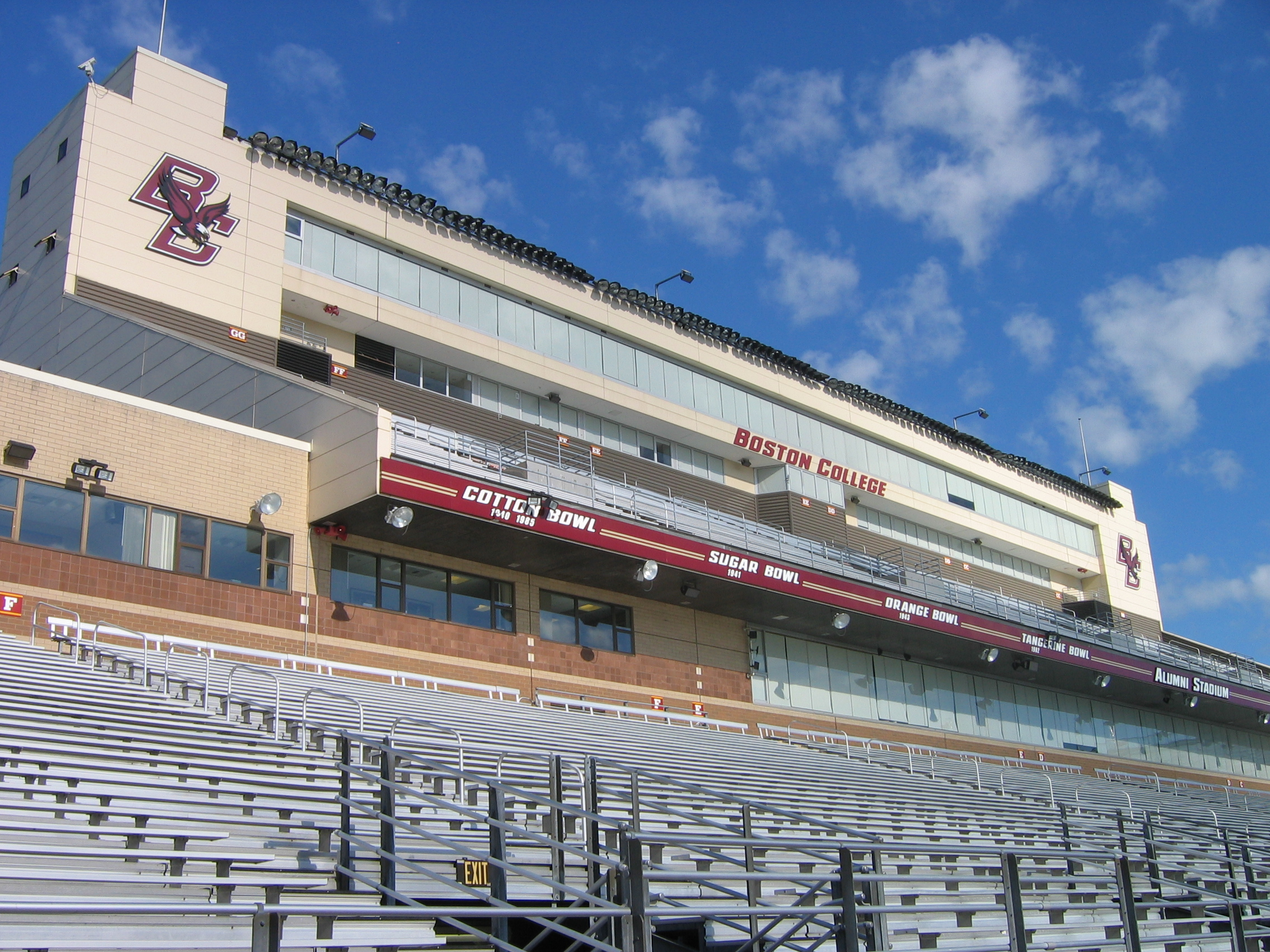
The stadium grandstand and boxes in 2008

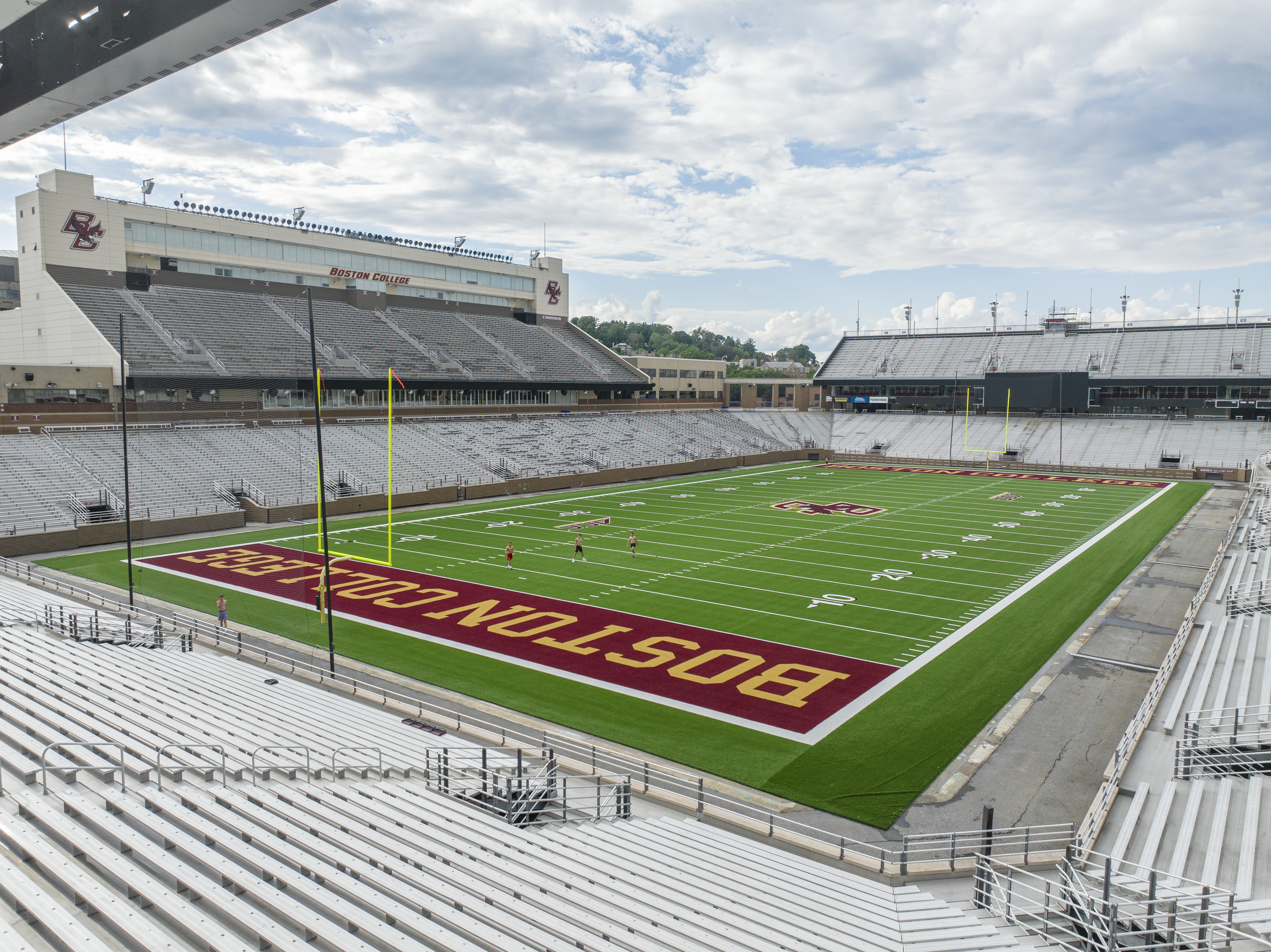
Alumni Stadium in 2023

In 1971, the stadium was expanded to 32,000 seats and artificial turf and lights were installed. The stadium was rebuilt again in 1988, adding near-identical upper decks on each sideline as well as a new press box, built into the new Conte Forum.

== See also ==
- List of NCAA Division I FBS football stadiums

Preceded by Fenway Park	Home of the Boston Patriots; 1969	Succeeded by Harvard Stadium
