= Ajay (given name) =

Ajay, also transliterated as Ajai (Devanagari: अजय; pronounced [ˈaːdʒeː] or [ˈaːdʒaːj]) is an Indian masculine given name originating in Sanskrit ajaya "unconquered", "unsurpassed", "invincible". A related name is Ajit.

== People ==
- Ajay Agarwal, Indian politician and lawyer
- Ajay Agrawal (born 1969), Canadian economist
- Ajay Ahuja (1964–1999), Indian fighter pilot killed during the Kargil War
- Ajay (actor), Indian actor
- Ajay (Uttar Pradesh politician) (born 1983), Indian politician
- Ajay Baines (born 1978), Canadian ice hockey player
- Ajay Banga (born 1959), Indian-American business executive
- Ajay Barik (born 1976), Indian cricketer
- Ajay Kumar Bhalla (born 1960), Governor of Manipur
- Ajay Bhatt (born 1957), Indian-American computer engineer
- Ajay Bhatt (politician) (born 1961), Indian politician
- Ajay Bhattacharya (revolutionary) (1914–1999), Bengali communist revolutionary and anti-colonial activist
- Ajay Bhupathi (born 1985), Indian film director and screenplay writer
- Ajay Bijli, Indian businessman
- Ajay Bisaria, Indian diplomat
- Ajay Kumar Bulganin, Indian politician
- Ajay Singh Chahar (1950–2020), Indian politician and diplomat
- Ajay Chakraborty (born 1943), Indian politician
- Ajay Chandrakar (born 1963), Indian politician
- Ajay Chaudhary (born 1983), Indian television actor and model
- Ajay Chaurasiya (born 1965), Nepalese politician
- Ajay Singh Chautala (born 1961), Indian politician
- Ajay Chhabra (born 1970), British actor
- Ajay Chhetri (born 1999), Indian footballer
- Ajay Chhibber, Indian economist
- Ajay Choudhari, Indian politician
- Ajay Chuttoo (born 1965), Mauritian long-distance runner
- Ajay Daby (born 1955), Mauritian politician
- Ajay Dalai (born 1959), Indian Canadian chemical engineer
- Ajay Kumar Dangi, Indian politician
- Ajay Data (born 1973), Indian entrepreneur
- Ajay Desai (1957–2020), Indian wildlife conservationist
- Ajay Devaloka, Indian film director and editor
- Ajay Devgn (born 1969), Indian actor and filmmaker
- Ajay Dubé (born 1960), Canadian field hockey player
- Ajay Dutt (born 1976), Indian politician
- Ajay Faleafaga (born 2003), New Zealand rugby union player
- Ajay Fry (born 1983), Canadian comedian and television personality
- Ajay Ghosh, Indian actor
- Ajay Dev Goud (born 2000), Indian cricketer
- Ajay Goyal (born 1965), Indian businessman
- Ajay Gudavarthy, Indian academic
- Ajay Gunness, Mauritian politician
- Ajay Gupta, Indian politician
- Ajay Jadeja (born 1971), Indian former cricketer
- Ajay Singh Jasrotia (1972–1999), Indian army officer
- Ajay Jayaram (born 1987), Indian badminton player
- Ajay Kumar Jena (1943–2023), Indian politician
- Ajay Jha (1956–2013), Indian cricketer
- Ajay Narayan Jha (born 1959), Indian civil servant
- Ajay Kakkar, Baron Kakkar (born 1964), British surgeon and life peer
- Ajay Kalamdhad, Indian academician
- Ajay Kalsi (born 1960), Indian billionaire businessman
- Ajay Kanu, Indian communist activist
- Ajay Kapoor (politician) (born 1967), Indian politician
- Ajay Kashyap, Indian Bollywood film director
- Ajay Khabra (born 1995), Canadian soccer player
- Ajay Khare, Indian bridge player
- Ajay Singh Kilak, Indian politician
- Ajay Kochhar, 48th Vice Chief of Naval Staff (India)
- Ajay Kohli, American marketing theorist
- Ajay Kothiyal (born 1969), Recipient of Kirti Chakra
- Ajay Kudua (born 1976), Indian cricketer
- Ajay Kumar (civil servant) (born 1962), Chairman of Union Public Service Commission
- Ajay Kumar (Uttar Pradesh politician) (born 1970), Indian politician
- Ajay Kushwaha, Indian politician
- Ajay Kumar Kushwaha, Indian politician from Bihar
- Ajay Lalcheta (born 1983), Indian cricketer
- Ajai Lall, Indian missionary
- Ajay Kumar Lallu (born 1979), Indian politician
- Ajay Mahawar, Indian politician
- Ajay Maken (born 1964), Indian politician
- Ajay Mandal (born 1996), Indian cricketer
- Ajay Kumar Mandal (born 1971), Indian politician
- Ajay Maroo (born 1958), Indian politician
- Ajay Mathur, Indian energy official
- Ajay Matthews (born 2007), English footballer
- Ajay Mehra (born 1969), Indian cricketer and sports commentator
- Ajay Mehta (born 1938), Indian actor based in North America
- Ajay Menon (born 1983), Indian cinematographer
- Ajay Mitchell (born 2002), Belgian basketball player
- Ajay Kumar Mittal (born 1958), 25th Former Chief Justice of Madhya Pradesh High Court
- Ajay Monga (born 1968), Indian scriptwriter and film director
- Ajay Nagrath (born 1986), Indian actor
- Ajay Naidu (born 1972), American actor
- Ajay Nanda (born 1967), Indian politician
- Ajay Navaria (born 1972), Indian writer
- Ajay Nayyar (born 1982), British-Indian actor
- Ajay Nishad (born 1966), Indian politician
- Ajay Bhushan Pandey (born 1962), Former Finance Secretary and CEO of UIDAI
- Ajay K. Pandey, Indian romance novel author
- Ajay Kumar Parida (1963–2022), Indian biologist
- Ajay Patel (born 1962), Indian businessman
- Ajay Piramal (born 1955), Indian businessman
- Ajay Pittman (born 1993), American politician
- Ajay Poddar, Indian-American engineer
- Ajay Kumar Poddar, Indian politician
- Ajay Pohankar (born 1948), Indian singer
- Ajay Prabhakar (born 1978), Indian researcher and author
- Ajay Prasanna (born 1979), Indian flute or bansuri player
- Ajay Purkar, Indian actor
- Ajay Rai (born 1969), Indian politician
- Ajay Raj (born 1982), Indian actor, choreographer
- Ajay Ramaswami (born 1980), Indian tennis player
- Ajay Rane, Australian physician, philanthropist and humanitarian
- Ajay Rao (born 1980), Indian actor
- Ajay Rastogi (born 1958), Indian judge
- Ajay Rathnam (born 1958), Indian actor
- Ajay Ratra (born 1981), Indian cricketer
- Ajay Ray, Indian politician in West Bengal
- Ajay Kumar Reddy (born 1990), Indian blind cricketer
- Ajay Rochester (born 1969), Australian actress, author and producer
- Ajay Rohera (born 1997), Indian cricketer
- Ajay Sadhotra (born 1955), Indian politician
- Ajay Sancheti (born 1965), Indian politician
- Ajay Sangha (born 1992), English cricketer
- Ajay Kumar Saroj (born 1997), Indian middle-distance runner
- Ajay Sastry (1974–2024), Indian film director
- Ajay Prakash Sawhney (born 1962), Indian civil servant
- Ajay Seth (born 1965), Chairman of IRDAI
- Ajay Sharma (born 1964), Indian cricketer
- Ajay Mitra Shastri (1934–2002), Indian academic and historian
- Ajay Shirke (born 1958), British businessman
- Ajay S. Shriram, Indian businessman
- Ajai Pal Singh (born 1969), Indian politician
- Ajay Singh (footballer) (born 1989), Indian footballer
- Ajay Singh (Karnataka politician) (born 1974), Indian politician in Karnataka
- Ajay Singh (entrepreneur), Indian businessman and sports administrator
- Ajay Singh (weightlifter) (born 1997), Indian weightlifter
- Ajay Arjun Singh (born 1955), Indian politician
- Ajay Kumar Singh (Uttar Pradesh politician) (born 1970), Indian politician
- Ajay Kumar Singh (Bihar politician, Bharatiya Janata Party), Indian politician
- Ajay Kumar Singh (Bihar politician, Rashtriya Janata Dal), Indian politician
- Ajay Kumar Singh (Bihar politician, Indian National Congress), Indian politician
- Ajay Pratap Singh (Madhya Pradesh politician) (born 1967), Indian politician
- Ajay Pratap Singh (Uttar Pradesh politician) (1964–2025), Indian politician
- Ajay Pratap Singh (librarian), Indian academic and librarian
- Ajay Raj Singh (born 1978), Indian sprinter
- Ajay Skaria (born 1965), Scholar of South Asian Politics
- Ajay Solanki (born 1971), Indian politician
- Ajay K. Sood (born 1951), Indian physicist
- Ajay Srivastava (born 1981), Indian film director and actor
- Ajay Tamta (born 1972), Indian politician
- Ajay Tandon, Indian politician
- Ajay Tavares (born 2009), English youth footballer
- Ajay Mishra Teni (born 1960), Indian Minister of State for Home Affairs
- Ajay Thakur (born 1987), Indian kabaddi player
- Ajay D. Theophilus, Indian admiral
- Ajay Kumar Tripathi (1957–2020), Indian judge
- Ajay Tyagi (born 2000), Indian professional rower
- Ajay Varma (Bengal cricketer) (1963–2026), Indian cricketer
- Ajay Varma (Kerala cricketer) (born 1963), Indian cricketer
- Ajai Vasudev, Indian film director
- Ajay Vidyasagar (born 1969), TV Executive
- Ajay Vinze, American business professor
- Ajay Vishnoi, Indian politician
- Ajay Wadhavkar, Hindi actor
- Ajay Yadav (born 1986), Indian cricketer
- Ajay Kumar Yadav (born 1985), Indian politician
- Ajay Singh Yadav (born 1958), Indian politician
- Ajay Veer Yadav (born 1970), Indian politician

Ajai

- Ajai Chowdhry (born 1950), Indian businessperson
- Ajai Daniels (born 1998), Bermudian footballer
- Ajai Kumar (born 1951), Indian oncologist and entrepreneur
- Ajai Lall, Indian missionary
- Ajai Lamba (born 1958), Former Chief Justice of Gauhati High Court
- Ajai Malhotra (born 1953), Indian diplomat
- Ajai P Mangattu (born 1972), Indian writer
- Ajai Sahni, Indian counter-terrorist expert
- Ajai Sanders (born 1967), American actress and comedian
- Ajai Shukla (born 1959), Indian soldier and journalist
- Ajai Singh (1934–2023), Indian general
- Ajai Singh (lieutenant general), Indian Army officer
- Ajai K. Singh (born 1953), Indian chemist
- Ajai Kumar Singh, Indian Army general
- Ajai Pal Singh (born 1969), Indian politician
- Ajai Kumar Srivastava (born 1963), Indian judge
- Ajai Vasudev, Indian film director

== Fictional characters ==
- Ajay Ghale, protagonist of the video game Far Cry 4
- Ajay Kapoor (Neighbours), from the Australian soap opera Neighbours

== See also ==
- Ajay (disambiguation)
- AJ (disambiguation)
