= 2025–26 Norwich City F.C. season =

English football club season

Norwich City
2025–26 season
- Owner: Norfolk FB Holdings LLC
- Head coach: Liam Manning (until 8 November); Philippe Clement (from 18 November)
- Stadium: Carrow Road
- Championship: 9th
- FA Cup: Fifth round
- EFL Cup: Second round
- Top goalscorer: League: Jovon Makama (10); All: Jovon Makama (13)
- Highest home attendance: 26,826 (Ipswich)
- Lowest home attendance: 24,640 (West Brom- League); 17,351 (Southampton- Cup)
- Average home league attendance: 25,886

The 2025–26 season was the 124th season in the history of Norwich City, and their fourth consecutive season in the Championship. In addition to the domestic league, the club also competed in the season's editions of the FA Cup and the EFL Cup.

== Managerial changes ==
On 8 November, Liam Manning was sacked as head coach following the 2–1 home defeat to Leicester City. He lasted seventeen games in charge and had a win ratio of 17.65%. Ten days later, Philippe Clement was announced as the new head coach on a deal until the end of the 2028–29 season.

== First-team squad ==
As of 27 February 2026

No.	Name	Position	Nationality	Place of birth	Date of birth (age)	Signed from	Date signed	Fee	Contract end
Goalkeepers
1	Vladan Kovačević	GK	(Bosnia and Herzegovina)	Banja Luka	11 April 1998 (age 28)	(Portugal) Sporting CP	26 June 2025	Undisclosed	30 June 2029
31	Louie Moulden	GK	(England)	Bolton	6 January 2002 (age 24)	Crystal Palace	1 July 2025	Free Transfer	30 June 2027
32	Daniel Grimshaw	GK	(England)	Salford	16 February 1998 (age 28)	Plymouth Argyle	6 June 2025	Undisclosed	30 June 2028
Defenders
2	Harry Amass	LB	(England)	London	16 March 2007 (age 19)	Manchester United	24 January 2026	Loan	30 June 2026
3	Jack Stacey	RB	(England)	Ascot	6 April 1996 (age 30)	Bournemouth	1 July 2023	Free Transfer	30 June 2027
4	Shane Duffy	CB	(Republic of Ireland)	Derry	1 January 1992 (age 34)	Fulham	1 July 2023	Free Transfer	30 June 2026
5	Jakov Medić	CB	(Croatia)	Zagreb	7 September 1998 (age 28)	(Netherlands) Ajax	25 June 2025	Undisclosed	30 June 2028
6	Harry Darling	CB	(England)	Cambridge	8 August 1999 (age 27)	(Wales) Swansea City	1 July 2025	Free Transfer	30 June 2028
14	Ben Chrisene	LB	(England)	Exeter	12 January 2004 (age 22)	Aston Villa	30 July 2024	Undisclosed	30 June 2028
15	Ruairi McConville	CB	(Northern Ireland)	Belfast	1 May 2005 (age 21)	Brighton & Hove Albion	3 February 2025	Undisclosed	30 June 2030
27	Jeffrey Schlupp	LB	(Ghana)	(Germany) Hamburg	23 December 1992 (age 33)	Crystal Palace	24 July 2025	Free Transfer	30 June 2026
33	José Córdoba	CB	(Panama)	Panama City	3 June 2001 (age 25)	(Bulgaria) Levski Sofia	14 June 2024	Undisclosed	30 June 2028
35	Kellen Fisher	RB	(England)	Bexley	5 May 2004 (age 22)	Bromley	16 June 2023	Undisclosed	30 June 2026
Midfielders
7	Pelle Mattsson	DM	(Denmark)	Marstal	4 August 2001 (age 25)	(Denmark) Silkeborg	29 August 2025	Undisclosed	30 June 2028
8	Liam Gibbs	CM	(England)	Bury St Edmunds	16 December 2002 (age 23)	Ipswich Town	23 July 2021	Undisclosed	30 June 2028
11	Emiliano Marcondes	AM	(Denmark)	Hvidovre	9 March 1995 (age 31)	Free agent	4 October 2024	Free Transfer	30 June 2026
16	Jacob Wright	DM	(England)	Manchester	21 September 2005 (age 21)	Manchester City	1 June 2025	Undisclosed	30 June 2029
18	Forson Amankwah	CM	(Ghana)	Accra	31 December 2002 (age 23)	(Austria) Red Bull Salzburg	9 August 2024	Undisclosed	30 June 2028
20	Anis Ben Slimane	CM	(Tunisia)	(Denmark) Copenhagen	16 March 2001 (age 25)	Sheffield United	30 August 2024	Undisclosed	30 June 2028
22	Mirko Topić	DM	(Serbia)	Novi Sad	5 February 2001 (age 25)	(Portugal) Famalicão	3 August 2025	Undisclosed	30 June 2029
23	Kenny McLean	CM	(Scotland)	Rutherglen	8 January 1992 (age 34)	(Scotland) Aberdeen	22 January 2018	£200,000	30 June 2026
25	Paris Maghoma	AM	(England)	Enfield	8 May 2001 (age 25)	Brentford	26 January 2026	Undisclosed	30 June 2029
26	Sam Field	DM	(England)	Stourbridge	8 May 1998 (age 28)	Queens Park Rangers	2 February 2026	Loan	30 June 2026
29	Oscar Schwartau	AM	(Denmark)	Sengeløse	17 May 2006 (age 20)	(Denmark) Brøndby	24 August 2024	Undisclosed	30 June 2028
Forwards
10	Matěj Jurásek	RW	(Czech Republic)	Karviná	30 August 2003 (age 23)	(Czech Republic) Slavia Prague	3 February 2025	Undisclosed	30 June 2030
17	Ante Crnac	CF	(Croatia)	Sisak	17 December 2003 (age 22)	(Poland) Raków Częstochowa	22 August 2024	Undisclosed	30 June 2028
19	Papa Amadou Diallo	LW	(Senegal)	Saint-Louis	25 June 2004 (age 22)	(France) Metz	24 July 2025	Undisclosed	30 June 2029
21	Ali Ahmed	LW	(Canada)	Toronto	10 October 2000 (age 26)	(Canada) Vancouver Whitecaps	5 January 2026	Undisclosed	30 June 2029
24	Jovon Makama	CF	(England)	Nottingham	1 February 2004 (age 22)	Lincoln City	4 August 2025	Undisclosed	30 June 2028
30	Mathias Kvistgaarden	CF	(Denmark)	Birkerød	15 April 2002 (age 24)	(Denmark) Brøndby	8 July 2025	Undisclosed	30 June 2029
37	Mohamed Touré	CF	(Australia)	(Guinea) Conakry	26 March 2004 (age 22)	(Denmark) Randers	1 February 2026	Undisclosed	30 June 2030
42	Tony Springett	RW	(Republic of Ireland)	(England) Lewisham	22 September 2002 (age 24)	Academy	1 July 2021	—N/a	30 June 2025

== Transfers ==
=== In ===
Date	Pos.	Player	From	Fee	Ref.
1 June 2025 (Note: The transfer was announced on 28 May, and would become official on 1 June when the transfer window had reopened)	CDM	(England) Jacob Wright	(England) Manchester City	Undisclosed	
6 June 2025	GK	(England) Daniel Grimshaw	(England) Plymouth Argyle	Undisclosed	
17 June 2025	GK	(England) Rylee Mitchell (Note: Initially signed for the U21s)	(England) Stevenage	Undisclosed	
25 June 2025	CB	(Croatia) Jakov Medić	(Netherlands) Ajax	Undisclosed	
26 June 2025	GK	(Bosnia and Herzegovina) Vladan Kovačević	(Portugal) Sporting CP	Undisclosed	
1 July 2025 (Note: The transfer of Darling was announced on 16 June, and became official on 1 July when his Swansea City contract expired.) (Note: The transfer of Moulden was announced on 18 June, and became official on 1 July when his Crystal Palace contract expired.)	CB	(England) Harry Darling	(Wales) Swansea City	Free	
1 July 2025	GK	(England) Louie Moulden	(England) Crystal Palace	Free	
3 July 2025	CM	(England) Reece Wilkes (Note: Initially signed for the U18s)	(England) Fleetwood Town	Undisclosed	
8 July 2025	CF	(Denmark) Mathias Kvistgaarden	(Denmark) Brøndby	Undisclosed	
11 July 2025	CM	(England) Luke Towler	(England) Ipswich Town	Free	
11 July 2025	GK	(Wales) Luis Lines	(England) Coventry City	Free	
24 July 2025	LB	(Ghana) Jeffrey Schlupp	(England) Crystal Palace	Free	
24 July 2025	LW	(Senegal) Papa Amadou Diallo	(France) Metz	Undisclosed	
31 July 2025	CF	(Scotland) Reuben Cooper	(Scotland) Kilmarnock	Undisclosed	
31 July 2025	CDM	(Northern Ireland) Glenn McCourt	(Northern Ireland) Derry City	Undisclosed	
3 August 2025	CDM	(Serbia) Mirko Topić	(Portugal) Famalicão	Undisclosed	
4 August 2025	CF	(England) Jovon Makama	(England) Lincoln City	Undisclosed	
28 August 2025	CF	(Iraq) Botan Ameen	(England) Swindon Town	Undisclosed	
29 August 2025	CDM	(Denmark) Pelle Mattsson	(Denmark) Silkeborg	Undisclosed	
1 September 2025	CM	(Ukraine) Zach Baumann	(England) Manchester United	Undisclosed	
4 January 2026	LW	(Canada) Ali Ahmed	(Canada) Vancouver Whitecaps	Undisclosed	
14 January 2026	LW	(Republic of Ireland) Luke Chukwu	(Republic of Ireland) St Patrick's Athletic	Undisclosed	
26 January 2026	AM	(England) Paris Maghoma	(England) Brentford	Undisclosed	
1 February 2026	CF	(Australia) Mohamed Touré	(Denmark) Randers	£2,600,000	

=== Out ===
Date	Pos.	Player	To	Fee	Ref.
16 June 2025	LW	(England) Jonathan Rowe	(France) Marseille	Undisclosed	
13 July 2025	LW	(Spain) Borja Sainz	(Portugal) Porto	Undisclosed	
14 August 2025	CB	(England) Brad Hills	(England) Stockport County	Undisclosed	
29 August 2025	CM	(Chile) Marcelino Núñez	(England) Ipswich Town	Undisclosed	
23 January 2026	CB	(Republic of Ireland) Emmanuel Adegboyega	(England) Rotherham United	Undisclosed	
23 February 2026	LW	(England) Ajay Tavares	(Spain) Barcelona	Undisclosed	
27 February 2026	FW	(United States) Josh Sargent	(Canada) Toronto	Undisclosed	

=== Loaned in ===
Date	Pos.	Player	From	Date until	Ref.
24 January 2026	LB	(England) Harry Amass	(England) Manchester United	31 May 2026	
2 February 2026	CDM	(England) Sam Field	(England) Queens Park Rangers	31 May 2026	

=== Loaned out ===
Date	Pos.	Player	To	Date until	Ref.
31 July 2025	GK	(Chile) Vicente Reyes	(England) Peterborough United	31 December 2025	
23 August 2025	CM	(England) Harry Brooke	(England) Hornchurch	31 December 2025	
25 August 2025	GK	(England) George Long	(England) Southampton	End of Season	
2 September 2025	GK	(Wales) Daniel Barden	(England) Dagenham & Redbridge	1 January 2026	
6 September 2025	GK	(England) Caleb Ansen	(England) Bedford Town	4 October 2025	
4 October 2025	CF	(England) Damari Daley	(England) Wroxham	1 November 2025	
4 October 2025	LB	(England) Tyler Williams	(England) Wroxham	1 November 2025	
15 October 2025	CB	(England) Lloyd Ofori-Manteaw	(England) Lowestoft Town	22 December 2025 (Note: On 24 November, Ofori-Manteaw's loan at Lowestoft was extended for a further month)	
16 October 2025	CB	(England) Charlie Wilson	(England) King's Lynn Town	22 December 2025 (Note: On 24 November, Wilson's loan at King's Lynn was extended for a further month)	
23 October 2025	GK	(Wales) Jack Ruddy	(England) Kirkley & Pakefield	22 November 2025	
1 November 2025	GK	(England) Ethan Binnie	(England) Cray Wanderers	27 November 2025	
4 November 2025	CF	(England) Ken Aboh	(England) Boston United	2 December 2025	
8 November 2025	GK	(England) Henry Bullen	(England) Wroxham	6 December 2025	
22 November 2025	GK	(Wales) Luis Lines	(England) Canvey Island	20 December 2025	
24 November 2025	CF	(England) Damari Daley	(England) Bury Town	22 December 2025	
24 November 2025	CF	(England) La'Sean Sealey	(England) King's Lynn Town	22 December 2025	
16 January 2026	LW	(Scotland) Brandon Forbes	(England) Tamworth	14 February 2026	
16 January 2026	CF	(England) Dylan Jones	(England) Tranmere Rovers	31 May 2026	
16 February 2026	CM	(England) AJ Bridge	(England) Cork City	30 June 2026	
28 February 2026	GK	(England) Caleb Ansen	(England) Aveley		
17 March 2026	LW	(Scotland) Brandon Forbes	(England) King's Lynn Town	31 May 2026	
17 March 2026	RB	(Germany) Harmony Okwumo	(England) King's Lynn Town	31 May 2026	

=== Released / Out of Contract ===
Date	Pos.	Player	Subsequent club	Join date	Ref.
30 June 2025	GK	(England) Ellis Craven	(England) Salford City	1 July 2025	
30 June 2025	CB	(England) Lewis Shipley	(England) Barrow	1 July 2025	
30 June 2025	CB	(England) Gabriel Keita	(Wales) Cardiff City	3 July 2025	
30 June 2025	DM	(Denmark) Jacob Sørensen	(Norway) SK Brann	7 July 2025	
30 June 2025	RB	(England) Kingston Simbai	(England) Barnsley	15 July 2025	
30 June 2025	GK	(England) Tom Finch	(England) Milton Keynes Dons	18 July 2025	
30 June 2025	GK	(Scotland) Angus Gunn	(England) Nottingham Forest	6 August 2025	
30 June 2025	GK	(Scotland) Archie Mair	(England) Morecambe	21 August 2025	
30 June 2025	CF	(England) Daniel Ogwuru	(England) Morecambe	22 August 2025	
30 June 2025	CF	(Wales) Alex Roberts	(England) Spalding United	29 August 2025	
30 June 2025	LW	(Cuba) Onel Hernández	(England) Charlton Athletic	29 September 2025	
30 June 2025	CB	(United States) Jonathan Tomkinson	(England) Cheltenham Town	10 October 2025	
30 June 2025	CB	(England) Alfie Doy	(England) Fakenham Town	24 November 2025	
30 June 2025	CM	(England) Adian Manning			
5 January 2026	CM	(England) Finley Welch	(South Korea) Chungbuk Cheongju	8th January 2026	
5 January 2026	CM	(England) Harry Brooke	(England) Hornchurch	16 January 2026	
5 January 2026	CM	(Spain) Hugo Valencia			

== Pre-season and friendlies ==
On 13 May, Norwich City announced a training camp in the Netherlands as part of their pre-season preparations and two friendlies against Northampton Town (behind closed doors) and NAC Breda. Two weeks later, further friendlies were confirmed against Volendam, Zulte Waregem, Olympiacos and NAC Breda.

Win Draw Loss Fixtures

12 July 2025 Friendly	Norwich City	3–1	Northampton Town	Colney
13:00 BST	Jurásek 26'; Sealey 33'; Willis 90' (o.g.)	Report	Jacobs 42'	Stadium: Colney Training Centre; Attendance: 0 (behind closed doors)

19 July 2025 Friendly	Norwich City	1–1	FC Volendam	Burgh-Haamstede
12:00 CEST	Own goal 46'; Duffy (yellow card) 67'; Hills (yellow card) 69'	Report	Oehlers 51'	Stadium: Sportpark van Zuijen

19 July 2025 Friendly	Zulte Waregem	1–1	Norwich City	Waregem
19:00 CEST	Lofolomo (red card) 11'; Traoré 87'	Report	Mundle-Smith 40', (yellow card) 73'; Bridge (red card) 47'	Stadium: Elindus Arena

25 July 2025 Friendly	Olympiacos	3–0	Norwich City	Schiedam
12:00 CEST	Yazıcı 31'; Yaremchuk 47'; Biancone 56'	Report		Stadium: Sportvereniging Combinatie Wil Overwinnen

25 July 2025 Friendly	ADO Den Haag	0–0	Norwich City	The Hague
19:00 CEST		Report		Stadium: Bingoal Stadion

2 August 2025 Friendly	Norwich City	0–1	NAC Breda	Colney
11:00 BST		Report	Talvitie 42'	Stadium: Colney Training Centre; Attendance: 0 (behind closed doors)

2 August 2025 Friendly	Norwich City	2–0	NAC Breda	Norwich
15:00 BST	Crnac 8'; Sargent 11'	Report		Stadium: Carrow Road; Attendance: 12,748; Referee: Josh Smith

== Competitions ==
=== Overall record ===
Competition	First match	Last match	Starting round	Final position	Record							
Competition	First match	Last match	Starting round	Final position	Pld	W	D	L	GF	GA	GD	Win %
Championship	9 August 2025	2 May 2026	Matchday 1	9th	46	19	8	19	63	56	+7	41.30
FA Cup	11 January 2026	8 March 2026	Third round	Fifth round	3	2	0	1	8	5	+3	66.67
EFL Cup	12 August 2025	26 August 2025	First round	Second round	2	1	0	1	2	4	−2	50.00
Total					51	22	8	21	73	65	+8	43.14

Source: Soccerway

=== Championship ===
==== League table ====
Pos	Team	Pld	W	D	L	GF	GA	GD	Pts
7	Wrexham	46	19	14	13	69	65	+4	71
8	Derby County	46	20	9	17	67	59	+8	69
9	Norwich City	46	19	8	19	63	56	+7	65
10	Birmingham City	46	17	13	16	57	56	+1	64
11	Swansea City	46	18	10	18	57	59	−2	64

Source: EFL Official Website
Rules for classification: 1) Points; 2) Goal difference; 3) Number of goals scored; 4) Head-to-head results; 5) Wins; 6) Away goals; 7) Penalty points (sec 9.5); 8) Number of 12-point sending off offences; 9) Play-off (only if needed to determine promotion/relegation)

==== Results summary ====
Overall								Home						Away					
Pld	W	D	L	GF	GA	GD	Pts	W	D	L	GF	GA	GD	W	D	L	GF	GA	GD
46	19	8	19	63	56	+7	65	9	3	11	28	29	−1	10	5	8	35	27	+8

Source: Soccerway

==== Results by round ====
Round	1	2	3	4	5	6	7	8	9	10	11	12	13	14	15	16	17	18	19	20	21	22	23	24	25	26	27	28	29	30	31	32	33	34	35	37	38	36^{1}	39	40	41	42	43	44	45	46
Ground	H	A	H	A	A	H	A	H	A	H	A	A	H	A	H	A	H	H	A	A	H	A	H	H	A	H	A	A	H	A	H	A	H	H	A	H	H	A	A	H	A	H	A	H	H	A
Result	L	W	L	W	D	L	D	L	L	L	L	L	L	D	L	L	D	W	L	D	W	D	W	L	W	L	W	W	W	L	W	W	L	W	W	W	W	L	W	D	W	L	W	W	D	L
Position	18	11	17	11	10	15	14	19	19	20	22	23	23	22	23	23	23	23	23	23	23	23	23	23	22	22	22	20	18	19	17	16	18	17	17	15	12	12	10	11	9	9	9	9	9	9
Points	0	3	3	6	7	7	8	8	8	8	8	8	8	9	9	9	10	13	13	14	17	18	21	21	24	24	27	30	33	33	36	39	39	42	45	48	51	51	54	55	58	58	61	64	65	65

Source: Soccerway
A = Away; H = Home; W = Win; D = Draw; L = Loss; P = Postponed
Notes:
- ^{1} Matchday 36 (vs. Southampton was postponed due to both clubs advancing to the FA Cup fifth round.

==== Matches ====
Win Draw Loss Fixtures

9 August 2025 1	Norwich City	1–2	Millwall	Norwich
15:00 BST	Sargent 55'; Wright (yellow card) 89'	Report	Tanganga (yellow card) 35'; Cooper (yellow card) 40'; Neghli 51'; Langstaff 83'; Mitchell (yellow card) 87'; Crama (yellow card) 90+7'	Stadium: Carrow Road; Attendance: 26,546; Referee: Adam Herczeg

16 August 2025 2	Portsmouth	1–2	Norwich City	Portsmouth
12:30 BST	Poole (yellow card) 58'; Segecic 84'; Ogilvie (yellow card) 90+7'; Swift (yellow card) 90+9'	Report	Darling 6', (yellow card) 90+8'; Sargent 14'; Topić (yellow card) 25'; Córdoba (yellow card) 43'	Stadium: Fratton Park; Attendance: 20,382; Referee: Stephen Martin
Note: Fixture was initially scheduled for a 15:00 kick-off, but was moved live Sky Sports broadcast.

23 August 2025 3	Norwich City	1–2	Middlesbrough	Norwich
15:00 BST	Wright (red card) 58'; Sargent 85'	Report	Azaz 43'; Conway 45'; Hackney (yellow card) 48'; Brittain (yellow card) 61'; Nypan (yellow card) 90+7'	Stadium: Carrow Road; Attendance: 26,381; Referee: Leigh Doughty

30 August 2025 4	Blackburn Rovers	0–2	Norwich City	Blackburn
15:00 BST	McLoughlin (red card) 44'; Tronstad (yellow card) 52'; Cantwell (yellow card) 81'	Report	Sargent 45' (pen.), 90+1'	Stadium: Ewood Park; Attendance: 13,580; Referee: Ben Speedie

13 September 2025 5	Coventry City	1–1	Norwich City	Coventry
15:00 BST	Thomas (yellow card) 36'; Kitching (yellow card) 54'; Wright 90+6'	Report	Kvistgaarden 17'; Fisher (yellow card) 34'; Kovačević (yellow card) 44'; Diallo (yellow card) 53'; Topić (yellow card) 71'; Medić (yellow card) 90+5'; Crnac (yellow card) 90+9'	Stadium: Coventry Building Society Arena; Attendance: 30,547; Referee: Gavin Ward

20 September 2025 6	Norwich City	2–3	Wrexham	Norwich
15:00 BST	Topić (yellow card) 13'; Stacey 39'; Makama 90+2'	Report	Doyle (yellow card) 35'; Windass 47', 59'; Longman 54'; O'Brien (yellow card) 62'; Dobson (yellow card) 74'	Stadium: Carrow Road; Attendance: 26,201; Referee: David Webb

27 September 2025 7	Stoke City	1–1	Norwich City	Stoke-on-Trent
15:00 BST	Thomas 48'	Report	Makama 26'; Darling (yellow card) 74'; McLean (yellow card) 76'; Fisher (yellow card) 90+2'	Stadium: Bet365 Stadium; Attendance: 25,200; Referee: Elliot Bell

1 October 2025 8	Norwich City	0–1	West Bromwich Albion	Norwich
19:45 BST	Crnac (yellow card) 79'	Report	Maja 20'; Campbell (yellow card) 28'; Mepham (yellow card) 66'; Price (yellow card) 70'; Mowatt (yellow card) 71'	Stadium: Carrow Road; Attendance: 24,640; Referee: Sam Allison

5 October 2025 9	Ipswich Town	3–1	Norwich City	Ipswich
12:00 BST	Kipré 32'; Philogene 45', (yellow card) 73'; Clarke 77'	Report	Schwartau 35'; Darling (yellow card) 38'; McLean (yellow card) 73'; Mattsson (yellow card) 81'	Stadium: Portman Road; Attendance: 29,809; Referee: Thomas Kirk
Note: Fixture was initially scheduled for 4 October, but was moved live Sky Sports broadcast.

18 October 2025 10	Norwich City	0–1	Bristol City	Norwich
15:00 BST	Medić (yellow card) 18'; Mattsson (yellow card) 89'	Report	Vyner (yellow card) 24'; McCrorie (yellow card) 37'; Randell (yellow card) 59'; Sykes 73'	Stadium: Carrow Road; Attendance: 26,249; Referee: Tom Nield

21 October 2025 11	Derby County	1–0	Norwich City	Derby
19:45 BST	Sanderson (yellow card) 47'; Ozoh 55'; Adams (yellow card) 60'	Report	Stacey (yellow card) 10'	Stadium: Pride Park Stadium; Attendance: 25,844; Referee: Ben Toner

25 October 2025 12	Swansea City	2–1	Norwich City	Swansea
15:00 BST	Vipotnik 6', 69'; Cullen (yellow card) 45+1'; Stamenić (yellow card) 66'; Burgess (yellow card) 90+7'	Report	Makama 42'; Mattsson (yellow card) 65'	Stadium: Swansea.com Stadium; Attendance: 14,729; Referee: Adam Herczeg

1 November 2025 13	Norwich City	0–2	Hull City	Norwich
12:30 GMT	Schlupp (yellow card) 28'	Report	Gelhardt 49'; Crooks (yellow card) 74'; Joseph (yellow card) 78'; Gyabi 87'	Stadium: Carrow Road; Attendance: 25,724; Referee: Josh Smith
Note: Fixture was originally scheduled for a 15:00 kick-off, but was moved live Sky Sports broadcasting.

5 November 2025 14	Sheffield Wednesday	1–1	Norwich City	Sheffield
19:45 GMT	Bannan 4'	Report	Duffy (yellow card) 17'; Kvistgaarden 61'; Fisher (yellow card) 62'; Schlupp (yellow card) 86'; McConville (yellow card) 90+6'	Stadium: Hillsborough Stadium; Attendance: 28,156; Referee: Edward Duckworth

8 November 2025 15	Norwich City	1–2	Leicester City	Norwich
15:00 GMT	Kvistgaarden 62'; Darling (yellow card) 76'	Report	Pereira (yellow card) 9'; De Cordova-Reid 75'; James 90+2'	Stadium: Carrow Road; Attendance: 26,213; Referee: Dean Whitestone

22 November 2025 16	Birmingham City	4–1	Norwich City	Bordesley
15:00 GMT	Ducksch 3', 44'; Neumann (yellow card) 15'; Stansfield 21', 54'	Report	Makama (yellow card) 30'; Kvistgaarden 33'; Stacey (yellow card) 35'	Stadium: St Andrew's; Attendance: 28,080; Referee: Anthony Backhouse

25 November 2025 17	Norwich City	1–1	Oxford United	Norwich
19:45 GMT	Makama 29'; Fisher (yellow card) 89'	Report	Krastev 90+5'	Stadium: Carrow Road; Attendance: 24,922; Referee: Tom Reeves
Note: Fixture was originally scheduled for 26 November but was moved due to Oxford's previous fixture rescheduling.

29 November 2025 18	Norwich City	3–1	Queens Park Rangers	Norwich
15:00 GMT	Marcondes 9'; Mbengue 33' (o.g.); Amankwah 36'; McLean (yellow card) 76'; Duffy (yellow card) 80'	Report	Burrell 11', (yellow card) 57'; Smyth (yellow card) 86'	Stadium: Carrow Road; Attendance: 25,571; Referee: Lewis Smith

6 December 2025 19	Watford	3–2	Norwich City	Watford
12:30 GMT	Chakvetadze (yellow card) 24'; Kjerrumgaard 33', 61'; Ince 78'	Report	Darling (yellow card) 8'; Sargent 11'; Schwartau 45'; Kovačević (yellow card) 54'	Stadium: Vicarage Road; Attendance: 18,871; Referee: Tom Nield
Note: Fixture was originally scheduled for a 15:00 kick-off, but was moved for live Sky Sports broadcasting.

9 December 2025 20	Sheffield United	1–1	Norwich City	Sheffield
19:45 GMT	Seriki (yellow card) 33'; Ings 50'; Soumaré (yellow card) 77'	Report	Medić (yellow card) 29'; Springett (yellow card) 48'; Soumaré 65' (o.g.); Mattsson (yellow card) 85'	Stadium: Bramall Lane; Attendance: 25,577; Referee: Josh Smith

13 December 2025 21	Norwich City	2–1	Southampton	Norwich
12:30 GMT	McConville (yellow card) 25'; Makama 48', 61'; Fisher (yellow card) 88'	Report	Manning 57'; Downes (yellow card) 84'; Romeu (yellow card) 90+8'	Stadium: Carrow Road; Attendance: 25,627; Referee: James Bell
Note: Fixture was originally scheduled for a 15:00 kick-off, but was moved for live Sky Sports broadcasting.

20 December 2025 22	Preston North End	1–1	Norwich City	Preston
12:30 GMT	Whiteman (yellow card) 50'; Hughes (yellow card) 64'; Keane 90+6'	Report	Wright (yellow card) 37'; Makama 85', (yellow card) 86'; Fisher (yellow card) 90+3'	Stadium: Deepdale; Attendance: 14,831; Referee: Stephen Martin
Note: Fixture was originally scheduled for a 15:00 kick-off, but was moved for live Sky Sports broadcasting.

26 December 2025 23	Norwich City	1–0	Charlton Athletic	Norwich
15:00 GMT	Chrisene (yellow card) 46'; Makama 61', (yellow card) 64'; Darling (yellow card) 65'	Report	Kaminski (yellow card) 64'; Campbell (yellow card) 77'	Stadium: Carrow Road; Attendance: 26,594; Referee: Matt Donohue

29 December 2025 24	Norwich City	0–1	Watford	Norwich
19:45 GMT		Report	Ngakia (yellow card) 66'; Semedo 90'	Stadium: Carrow Road; Attendance: 26,553; Referee: Matthew Corlett

1 January 2026 25	Queens Park Rangers	1–2	Norwich City	Shepherd's Bush
15:00 GMT	Mbengue 90+9'	Report	Chrisene (yellow card) 45+1'; Sargent 46'; Kovačević (yellow card) 72'; Stacey (yellow card) 82'; Makama 90+6'	Stadium: Loftus Road; Attendance: 17,452; Referee: Dean Whitestone

4 January 2026 26	Norwich City	0–2	Stoke City	Norwich
15:00 GMT	Fisher (yellow card) 85'	Report	Lawal (yellow card) 25'; Pearson (yellow card) 72'; Gallagher 75'; Thomas 82'	Stadium: Carrow Road; Attendance: 25,656; Referee: Farai Hallam

17 January 2026 27	Wrexham	1–2	Norwich City	Wrexham
15:00 GMT	Smith 24'	Report	Ben Slimane 9'; Makama 59'; Mattsson (yellow card) 79'	Stadium: Racecourse Ground; Attendance: 10,650; Referee: Will Finnie

20 January 2026 28	West Bromwich Albion	0–5	Norwich City	West Bromwich
19:45 GMT	Styles (yellow card) 14'; Bielik (yellow card) 23'	Report	Schwartau 16'; Ahmed 49'; Ben Slimane 69'; Chrisene 73'; Kovačević (yellow card) 87'; Kvistgaarden 89'	Stadium: The Hawthorns; Attendance: 21,031; Referee: James Bell

26 January 2026 29	Norwich City	2–1	Coventry City	Norwich
20:00 GMT	Ben Slimane 46'; Córdoba (yellow card) 55'; Ahmed 67'; Chrisene (yellow card) 90+7'	Report	Esse (yellow card) 18', (goal) 38'	Stadium: Carrow Road; Attendance: 25,452; Referee: Thomas Kirk
Note: Fixture was originally scheduled for 24 January, but was rescheduled for live Sky Sports broadcasting.

31 January 2026 30	Middlesbrough	1–0	Norwich City	Middlesbrough
15:00 GMT	Hackney 17'; Strelec (yellow card) 72'; Morris (yellow card) 80'	Report	Kovačević (yellow card) 56'; Ben Slimane (yellow card) 80'	Stadium: Riverside Stadium; Attendance: 28,616; Referee: Ben Toner

7 February 2026 31	Norwich City	2–0	Blackburn Rovers	Norwich
12:31 GMT	Ben Slimane 73', (yellow card) 74'; Touré 78'; Field (yellow card) 83'	Report	Cashin (yellow card) 88'; Cantwell (yellow card) 88'	Stadium: Carrow Road; Attendance: 25,628; Referee: James Linington
Note: Fixture was originally scheduled for a 15:00 kick-off, but was rescheduled for live Sky Sports broadcasting.

10 February 2026 32	Oxford United	0–3	Norwich City	Oxford
19:45 GMT	Peart-Harris (yellow card) 90+3'	Report	Touré 1', 19', 47'; Chrisene (yellow card) 53'	Stadium: Kassam Stadium; Attendance: 10,211; Referee: Sam Allison
Note: Fixture was initially scheduled for 14 February, but was rearranged due to both clubs' participation in the FA Cup fourth round.

21 February 2026 33	Norwich City	1–2	Birmingham City	Norwich
15:00 GMT	McLean 67'	Report	Vicente 5'; Ducksch 14'; Klarer (yellow card) 39'	Stadium: Carrow Road; Attendance: 26,537; Referee: Farai Hallam

25 February 2026 34	Norwich City	2–0	Sheffield Wednesday	Norwich
19:45 GMT	Kvistgaarden 31'; Maghoma 38'	Report		Stadium: Carrow Road; Attendance: 25,141; Referee: Ruebyn Ricardo

28 February 2026 35	Leicester City	0–2	Norwich City	Leicester
12:30 GMT	Okoli (yellow card) 57'; Thomas (yellow card) 64'	Report	Córdoba (yellow card) 60'; Gibbs (yellow card) 64'; Ben Slimane 68'; Ahmed 78'	Stadium: King Power Stadium; Attendance: 29,136; Referee: Adam Herczeg
Note: Fixture was originally scheduled for a 15:00 kick-off, but was rescheduled for live Sky Sports broadcasting.

11 March 2026 37	Norwich City	2–1	Sheffield United	Norwich
19:45 GMT	McLean (yellow card) 44'; Stacey 68'; Mattsson (yellow card) 72'; Amankwah 84'	Report	Riedewald 21'; Peck (yellow card) 77'; Hoever (yellow card) 90+3'	Stadium: Carrow Road; Attendance: 25,503; Referee: Ben Toner
Note: Fixture was initially scheduled for 10 March, but was rearranged due to being in FA Cup involvements on the preceding Sunday.

14 March 2026 38	Norwich City	2–0	Preston North End	Norwich
15:00 GMT	Ben Slimane (yellow card) 13'; Ahmed 17'; McLean 39'	Report	Potts (yellow card) 87'	Stadium: Carrow Road; Attendance: 25,285; Referee: Gavin Ward

18 March 2026 36	Southampton	1–0	Norwich City	Southampton
19:45 GMT	Azaz 24', (yellow card) 84'; Downes (yellow card) 48'; Harwood-Bellis (yellow card) 82'	Report	Ben Slimane (yellow card) 27'; Stacey (yellow card) 37'; Fisher (yellow card) 41'; Mattsson (yellow card) 69'	Stadium: St Mary's Stadium; Attendance: 26,605; Referee: Lewis Smith
Note: Fixture was initially scheduled for 7 March, but was rearranged due to both clubs advancing to the FA Cup fifth round.

21 March 2026 39	Charlton Athletic	0–1	Norwich City	Charlton
15:00 GMT	Docherty (yellow card) 34'; Leaburn (yellow card) 86'	Report	Mattsson 5', (yellow card) 71'; Fisher (yellow card) 61'	Stadium: The Valley; Attendance: 23,008; Referee: Will Finnie

3 April 2026 40	Norwich City	1–1	Portsmouth	Norwich
15:00 BST	Mattsson 26', (yellow card) 67'; Gibbs (yellow card) 46'; Wright (yellow card) 48'	Report	Pack (yellow card) 5'; Ogilvie (yellow card) 16'; Caballero (yellow card) 30'; Mattsson 84' (o.g.); Bishop (yellow card) 87'; Brown (yellow card) 90+4'	Stadium: Carrow Road; Attendance: 26,613; Referee: Stephen Martin

6 April 2026 41	Millwall	1–2	Norwich City	Bermondsey
13:00 BST	Ivanović 56'; Bryan (yellow card) 88'	Report	Córdoba (yellow card) 24'; Mattsson 62'; Schwartau 76', (yellow card) 88'	Stadium: The Den; Attendance: 18,855; Referee: Samuel Allison
Note: Fixture was originally scheduled for a 15:00 kick-off, but was moved on request by Millwall.

11 April 2026 42	Norwich City	0–2	Ipswich Town	Norwich
12:30 BST	Kvistgaarden (yellow card) 21'; Stacey (yellow card) 32'; McLean (yellow card) 60'; Darling (yellow card) 69'; Córdoba (yellow card) 76'	Report	Philogene 11' (pen.); Mehmeti (yellow card) 13'; Greaves (yellow card) 19'; Hirst (yellow card) 26', (goal) 45+1'; Núñez (yellow card) 69'; Davis (yellow card) 74'	Stadium: Carrow Road; Attendance: 26,826; Referee: Anthony Backhouse
Note: Fixture was initially scheduled for a 15:00 kick-off, but was rescheduled in line with Police and Safety Advisory Group guidances.

18 April 2026 43	Bristol City	2–4	Norwich City	Bristol
15:00 BST	Morsy 2'; Bell 90+3'	Report	Touré 51', 70', 75', (yellow card) 54'; McLean (yellow card) 72'; Córdoba 78'	Stadium: Ashton Gate; Attendance: 23,149; Referee: Ruebyn Ricardo

21 April 2026 44	Norwich City	2–1	Derby County	Norwich
19:45 BST	Touré 33', (yellow card) 45+5'; Gibbs 60'; Kovačević (yellow card) 69'	Report	Brereton Díaz (yellow card) 19'; Ozoh 54'; Travis (yellow card) 82'; Clarke (yellow card) 88'	Stadium: Carrow Road; Attendance: 25,058; Referee: Tom Reeves

25 April 2026 45	Norwich City	1–1	Swansea City	Norwich
15:00 BST	Mattsson (yellow card) 59'; Fisher (yellow card) 64'; Ahmed (yellow card) 69'; McLean 83' (pen.)	Report	Stamenić (yellow card) 25'; Eom (yellow card) 43'; Vipotnik 53' (pen.); Tymon (yellow card) 67'; Widell (yellow card) 78'; Vigouroux (yellow card) 81'	Stadium: Carrow Road; Attendance: 26,454; Referee: Thomas Parsons

2 May 2026 46	Hull City	2–1	Norwich City	Kingston upon Hull
12:30 BST	McBurnie 28' (pen.), 67'; Joseph (yellow card) 71'; Crooks (yellow card) 90+5'	Report	Touré 26'; Fisher (yellow card) 35'; Maghoma (yellow card) 90+5'	Stadium: MKM Stadium; Attendance: 24,616; Referee: Josh Smith

=== FA Cup ===
Norwich were drawn at home to Walsall in the third round, home to West Bromwich Albion in the fourth round and away to Leeds United in the fifth round.

Win Draw Loss Fixtures

11 January 2026 Third round	Norwich City	5–1	Walsall	Norwich
14:30 GMT	Jurásek 15'; Makama 24', 48', 55'; Springett 90+2'	Report	Clarke 67'	Stadium: Carrow Road; Attendance: 19,776; Referee: Edward Duckworth

14 February 2026 Fourth round	Norwich City	3–1	West Bromwich Albion	Norwich
15:00 GMT	Maghoma 31'; Darling (yellow card) 48'; Field (yellow card) 58'; Fisher (yellow card) 70'; Chrisene 82'; Toure 90+3'	Report	Bielik (yellow card) 14'; Mowatt (yellow card) 53'; Maja 68'; Diakité (yellow card) 85'	Stadium: Carrow Road; Attendance: 25,538; Referee: Tom Reeves

8 March 2026 Fifth round	Leeds United	3–0	Norwich City	Leeds
16:30 GMT	Longstaff 32', (yellow card) 39'; Gudmundsson 43'; Tanaka (yellow card) 59'; Piroe 85'	Report	Ahmed (yellow card) 25'; Córdoba (yellow card) 41'; Fisher (yellow card) 90+3'	Stadium: Elland Road; Attendance: 36,313; Referee: Darren England

=== EFL Cup ===
Norwich were drawn away to Watford in the first round and Southampton in the second round.

Win Draw Loss Fixtures

12 August 2025 First round	Watford	1–2	Norwich City	Watford
19:45 BST	Kayembe (yellow card) 49'; Baah 68'	Report	Sargent 10'; Núñez 24'; Medić (yellow card) 66'	Stadium: Vicarage Road; Attendance: 9,243; Referee: Dean Whitestone

26 August 2025 Second round	Norwich City	0–3	Southampton	Norwich
19:45 BST		Report	Archer 42'; Quarshie (yellow card) 48'; Fraser 62'; Matsuki 81'	Stadium: Carrow Road; Attendance: 17,351; Referee: Tom Nield

== Squad statistics ==
=== Appearances and goals ===
Italics indicate a loaned in player

No.	Pos	Nat	Player	Total		Championship		FA Cup		EFL Cup	
No.	Pos	Nat	Player	Apps	Goals	Apps	Goals	Apps	Goals	Apps	Goals
1	GK	(Bosnia and Herzegovina)	Vladan Kovačević	46	0	45	0	0+1	0	0	0
2	DF	(England)	Harry Amass	1	0	0+1	0	0	0	0	0
3	DF	(England)	Jack Stacey	39	2	22+14	2	2+1	0	0	0
4	DF	(Republic of Ireland)	Shane Duffy	4	0	3+1	0	0	0	0	0
5	DF	(Croatia)	Jakov Medić	18	0	13+3	0	0+1	0	1	0
6	DF	(England)	Harry Darling	38	1	34+1	1	1	0	2	0
7	MF	(Denmark)	Pelle Mattsson	34	3	30+3	3	1	0	0	0
8	MF	(England)	Liam Gibbs	25	1	13+7	1	1+2	0	1+1	0
10	FW	(Czech Republic)	Matěj Jurásek	19	1	6+10	0	1	1	1+1	0
11	MF	(Denmark)	Emiliano Marcondes	17	1	7+9	1	0	0	1	0
14	DF	(England)	Ben Chrisene	26	2	15+6	1	2+1	1	2	0
15	DF	(Northern Ireland)	Ruairi McConville	30	0	25+1	0	3	0	1	0
16	MF	(England)	Jacob Wright	31	0	13+15	0	2	0	0+1	0
17	FW	(Croatia)	Ante Crnac	12	0	8+3	0	0	0	0+1	0
18	MF	(Ghana)	Forson Amankwah	20	2	7+12	2	0+1	0	0	0
19	FW	(Senegal)	Papa Amadou Diallo	11	0	6+3	0	0	0	1+1	0
20	MF	(Tunisia)	Anis Ben Slimane	26	5	15+7	5	1+2	0	0+1	0
21	FW	(Canada)	Ali Ahmed	21	4	16+3	4	2	0	0	0
22	MF	(Serbia)	Mirko Topić	18	0	13+3	0	0	0	2	0
23	MF	(Scotland)	Kenny McLean	45	3	42	3	1+1	0	0+1	0
24	FW	(England)	Jovon Makama	31	13	18+10	10	1	3	0+2	0
25	MF	(England)	Paris Maghoma	16	2	8+6	1	2	1	0	0
26	MF	(England)	Sam Field	15	0	7+6	0	2	0	0	0
27	DF	(Ghana)	Jeffrey Schlupp	11	0	4+5	0	0	0	1+1	0
29	MF	(Denmark)	Oscar Schwartau	38	4	23+11	4	1+1	0	2	0
30	FW	(Denmark)	Mathias Kvistgaarden	40	6	12+24	6	3	0	1	0
31	GK	(England)	Louie Moulden	0	0	0	0	0	0	0	0
32	GK	(England)	Daniel Grimshaw	6	0	1	0	3	0	2	0
33	DF	(Panama)	José Córdoba	30	1	24+4	1	2	0	0	0
35	DF	(England)	Kellen Fisher	47	0	38+5	0	2	0	2	0
37	FW	(Australia)	Mohamed Touré	12	10	7+4	9	0+1	1	0	0
41	MF	(Scotland)	Gabriel Forsyth	0	0	0	0	0	0	0	0
42	MF	(Republic of Ireland)	Tony Springett	15	1	6+8	0	0+1	1	0	0
44	MF	(Wales)	Elliot Myles	0	0	0	0	0	0	0	0
46	FW	(England)	Errol Mundle-Smith	15	0	0+13	0	0+2	0	0	0
47	DF	(England)	Lucien Mahovo	6	0	2+4	0	0	0	0	0
48	DF	(England)	Theo Adelusi	0	0	0	0	0	0	0	0
52	MF	(Ukraine)	Zach Baumann	0	0	0	0	0	0	0	0
Player(s) who featured but departed the club permanently during the season:
9	FW	(United States)	Josh Sargent	24	8	23	7	0	0	1	1
26	MF	(Chile)	Marcelino Núñez	3	1	1+1	0	0	0	1	1

=== Goalscorers ===
Rnk	No	Pos	Nat	Name	Championship	FA Cup	EFL Cup	Total
1	24	FW	(England)	Jovon Makama	10	3	0	13
2	37	FW	(Australia)	Mohamed Touré	9	1	0	10
3	9	FW	(United States)	Josh Sargent	7	0	1	8
4	30	FW	(Denmark)	Mathias Kvistgaarden	6	0	0	6
5	20	MF	(Tunisia)	Anis Ben Slimane	5	0	0	5
6	21	MF	(Canada)	Ali Ahmed	4	0	0	4
6	29	MF	(Denmark)	Oscar Schwartau	4	0	0	4
8	7	MF	(Denmark)	Pelle Mattsson	3	0	0	3
8	23	MF	(Scotland)	Kenny McLean	3	0	0	3
10	3	DF	(England)	Jack Stacey	2	0	0	2
10	18	MF	(Ghana)	Forson Amankwah	2	0	0	2
10	14	DF	(England)	Ben Chrisene	1	1	0	2
10	25	MF	(England)	Paris Maghoma	1	1	0	2
14	6	DF	(England)	Harry Darling	1	0	0	1
14	11	MF	(Denmark)	Emiliano Marcondes	1	0	0	1
14	33	DF	(Panama)	José Córdoba	1	0	0	1
14	8	MF	(England)	Liam Gibbs	1	0	0	1
14	10	FW	(Czech Republic)	Matěj Jurásek	0	1	0	1
14	42	MF	(Republic of Ireland)	Tony Springett	0	1	0	1
14	26	MF	(Chile)	Marcelino Núñez	0	0	1	1
Own goals					2	0	0	2
Total					63	8	2	73

=== Disciplinary record ===
Rank	No.	Pos.	Nat.	Player	Championship		FA Cup		EFL Cup		Total	
Rank	No.	Pos.	Nat.	Player	Yellow card	Red card	Yellow card	Red card	Yellow card	Red card	Yellow card	Red card
1	16	MF	(England)	Jacob Wright	3	1	0	0	0	0	3	1
2	35	DF	(England)	Kellen Fisher	11	0	2	0	0	0	13	0
3	7	MF	(Denmark)	Pelle Mattsson	10	0	0	0	0	0	10	0
4	6	DF	(England)	Harry Darling	7	0	1	0	0	0	8	0
5	23	MF	(Scotland)	Kenny McLean	6	0	0	0	0	0	6	0
5	1	GK	(Bosnia and Herzegovina)	Vladan Kovačević	6	0	0	0	0	0	6	0
5	33	DF	(Panama)	José Córdoba	5	0	1	0	0	0	6	0
8	3	DF	(England)	Jack Stacey	5	0	0	0	0	0	5	0
9	20	MF	(Tunisia)	Anis Ben Slimane	4	0	0	0	0	0	4	0
10	5	DF	(Croatia)	Jakov Medić	3	0	0	0	1	0	4	0
11	22	MF	(Serbia)	Mirko Topić	3	0	0	0	0	0	3	0
11	24	FW	(England)	Jovon Makama	3	0	0	0	0	0	3	0
11	14	DF	(England)	Ben Chrisene	3	0	0	0	0	0	3	0
14	17	FW	(Croatia)	Ante Crnac	2	0	0	0	0	0	2	0
14	27	DF	(Ghana)	Jeffrey Schlupp	2	0	0	0	0	0	2	0
14	4	DF	(Republic of Ireland)	Shane Duffy	2	0	0	0	0	0	2	0
14	15	DF	(Northern Ireland)	Ruairi McConville	2	0	0	0	0	0	2	0
14	8	MF	(England)	Liam Gibbs	2	0	0	0	0	0	2	0
14	37	FW	(Australia)	Mohamed Touré	2	0	0	0	0	0	2	0
14	26	MF	(England)	Sam Field	1	0	1	0	0	0	2	0
14	21	MF	(Canada)	Ali Ahmed	1	0	1	0	0	0	2	0
22	19	FW	(Senegal)	Papa Amadou Diallo	1	0	0	0	0	0	1	0
22	42	MF	(Republic of Ireland)	Tony Springett	1	0	0	0	0	0	1	0
22	29	MF	(Denmark)	Oscar Schwartau	1	0	0	0	0	0	1	0
22	30	FW	(Denmark)	Mathias Kvistgaarden	1	0	0	0	0	0	1	0
22	25	MF	(England)	Paris Maghoma	1	0	0	0	0	0	1	0
Total					86	1	6	0	1	0	93	1
