= Ajay =

Ajay or Ajai may refer to:

== People ==
- Ajay (given name)
- Abe Ajay (1919–1998), American artist
- Ajay (actor), Indian actor prominent in Telugu cinema

== Places ==
- Ajai Wildlife Reserve, northeastern Uganda
- Ajay River, a major river in Jharkhand and West Bengal
- Ajay, Iran, a village in East Azerbaijan Province, Iran

== Films ==
- Ajay (1996 film), a 1996 Hindi-language film by Suneel Darshan
- Ajay (2006 film), a 2007 Indian Kannada-language film by Meher Ramesh
- Ajey: The Untold Story of a Yogi, a 2025 Indian Hindi-language biographical drama film about Yogi Adityanath
- Ajay, a fictional character from the 1976 Indian film Fakira, played by Danny Denzongpa
- Ajay Sharma, a fictional character from the 1993 Indian film Baazigar, played by Shah Rukh Khan
- Ajay Sanyal, a fictional character from the 2025 Indian film Dhurandhar, portrayed by R. Madhavan and based on Ajit Doval

== Other uses ==
- INS Ajay, ships of the Indian navy
- Ajai, a collaborative hip-hop album by Kenny Segal and Serengeti

== See also ==
- AJ (disambiguation)
