= Ajay Varma =

Ajay Varma may refer to:

- Ajay Varma (Kerala cricketer) (born 1963), bowler for Kerala cricket team
- Ajay Varma (Bengal cricketer) (1963–2026), all-rounder for Bengal cricket team
