= List of people from Palakkad district =

This is a list of notable people from Palakkad district in Kerala state, India. The list includes celebrities in the fields of literature, arts, dance, drama, music, films and politics.

== Art, dance, drama, music, sports and film personalities ==
- Major Ravi Nair, film director
- Gautham Vasudev Menon, film director
- Leela, film actress
- Keezhpadam Kumaran Nair, kathakali
- Ramankutty Nair, kathakali artist
- Kaushik Menon, playback singer
- M.S.Viswanathan, composer and playback singer
- M. D. Ramanathan, carnatic
- V T Bhattathiripad, drama
- Chembai Vaidyanatha Bhagavathar, carnatic
- P. Leela, playback singer
- Palghat Mani Iyer, mrudangam
- Unni Menon, playback singer
- Swarnalatha, playback singer
- P. Unnikrishnan, carnatic and playback singer
- Stephen Devassy, pianist, composer, arranger
- Kutty, cartoonist
- Shyamaprasad, film director, actor, producer, screenwriter, writer
- PU Chitra, athlete
- K.S. Sethumadhavan, film director
- Anumol, actress
- Raghuvaran, actor
- Kalamandalam Kesavan, actor
- Street Academics, hip-hop group
- V. A. Shrikumar Menon, film director
- Manikandan Pattambi, film actor
- Parvathy Nambiar, actress
- Alathur Brothers, carnatic
- Govind Padmasoorya, Indian television presenter
- Lakshmy Ramakrishnan, actress, screenwriter, director fashion designer

== Social, political and administrative personalities ==
- Sir Chettur Sankaran Nair, lawyer, statesman, only Keralite to become President of the Indian National Congress
- K P Kesava Menon, idealist, founder of Mathrubhoomi
- Shivshankar Menon, international diplomat
- T. N. Seshan, former chief election commissioner
- Shashi Tharoor, Under-Secretary General, UN, Loksabha MP, Congress Working Committee member
- Prakash Karat, former CPM General Secretary
- E Sreedharan, engineer, Delhi Metro Rail Corporation
- M K Narayanan, chief of Indian Intelligence Bureau
- V P Menon, officer of British India Administration
- Kunhiraman Palat Candeth, lieutenant general in the Indian Army
- K Sankaranarayanan governor of state
- Ajay Vidyasagar, Media Leader, Managing Director of Google Asia Pacific and YouTube, Board advisor National Institute of Technology

== Literary personalities ==
- Anita Nair
- P. R. Pisharoty (Kollengode, father of remote sensing in India)
- Kunjan Nambiar
- Olappamanna
- O V Vijayan
- Akkitham Achuthan Namboothiri
- Malayattoor Ramakrishnan
- Shashi Tharoor
- K. S. Sethumadhavan
