= Ajayaraja =

Ajayaraja is a given name. Notable people with the name include:

- Ajayaraja I (r. c. 721–734), Shakambhari Chahamana king of India
- Ajayaraja II (r. c. 1110–1135), Shakambhari Chahamana king of India

== See also ==
- Ajay (disambiguation)
- Raja (disambiguation)
