= Aje =

Aje or AJE may refer to:

== Aje ==
- Aje oil, obtained from larvae of the aje (coccus axin) used in Mexican lacquerware
- Aje, Ethiopia, the centre of the Shala woreda in the Oromia region
- Iyami Aje Yoruba concept of feminine power
- Kevin Joseph Aje, Nigerian Catholic bishop
- Aje, Taje language
- Ajegroup, Peruvian beverage company

== AJE ==
- AJE, a common abbreviation for Al Jazeera English, the English-language news channel operated by Al Jazeera Media Network]

== See also ==
- Ajay (given name), an Indian masculine given name (including a list of persons with the name)
