= 2012–13 Professional Development League =

2012–13 Professional Development League may refer to:

- 2012–13 Professional Development League 1, the top tier of under-21 academy football in England
- 2012–13 Professional Development League 2, the second tier of under-21 academy football in England
