= P34 =

P34 or P-34 may refer to:

== Vessels ==
- ARA Santísima Trinidad (P-34), a frigate of the Argentine Navy
- HMS Ultimatum (P34), a submarine of the Royal Navy
- INS Ajay (P34), ships of the Indian Navy

== Other uses ==
- Chuwabu language
- Cyclin-dependent kinase 1
- Papyrus 34, a biblical manuscript
- Phosphorus-34, an isotope of phosphorus
- Tyrrell P34, a Formula One race car
- Wedell-Williams XP-34, a cancelled American fighter aircraft
- P34, a state regional road in Latvia
