= A&J =

A&J may refer to:

- Adam and Joe, British comedy performers
- Arlo and Janis, comic strip
- A. & J. Inglis, shipbuilding firm founded in 1862 by Anthony Inglis and his brother John in Glasgow, Scotland

== See also ==
- AJ (disambiguation)
