= AJ =

AJ, or variants, may refer to:

== Arts, entertainment and media ==
=== Fictional characters ===
- Applejack (My Little Pony: Friendship Is Magic), a character from the fourth incarnation of My Little Pony
- A. J. (The Fairly OddParents), a fictional character
- A.J. Simon, a character in the American crime drama television series Simon & Simon
- A.J. Soprano, a fictional character in The Sopranos
- Superspinner AJ, a fictional character in the Starflyers series of computer games
- AJ, in AJ and the Queen, an American comedy-drama TV series
- Apollo Justice, a fictional character from Apollo Justice: Ace Attorney
- AJ, a character from Blaze and the Monster Machines

=== Literature ===
- Architects' Journal, an architectural magazine
- The Astronomical Journal, a peer-reviewed monthly scientific journal

=== Media ===
- Aj (newspaper), a Hindi-language daily broadsheet newspaper in India

== Businesses and organisations ==
- Al Jazeera Arabic, a Qatar-based international Arabic news channel
  - AJ+, an online news and current events channel
- AJ Capital Partners, an American private real estate company
- AJ's Fine Foods, an American supermarket chain
- AJ Institute of Engineering and Technology, in Mangalore, India

== Technology ==
- Jaguar AJ-V8, a line of V8 engines manufactured by Jaguar

== Other uses ==
- Adherens junction, a protein complex
- AJ (given name), including a list of people with the name or nickname
- aJ, attojoule, a unit of energy equal to 10^{−18} joules
- Australian Scout Jamboree, a triennial festival
- North American AJ Savage, an aircraft
- Azerbaijan, WMO, FIPS, LOC MARC and obsolete NATO country code
- Animal Jam Classic, an online game formerly known as Animal Jam
  - Animal Jam, an online mobile game formerly known as Animal Jam - Play Wild!

== See also ==
- A&J (disambiguation)
- Ajay (disambiguation)
- AAJ (disambiguation)
- AJJ (disambiguation)
- "Aj, aj, aj", a 1973 song by Schytts
