= AJJ =

AJJ may refer to:

- AJJ (band), an American folk punk band, formerly known as Andrew Jackson Jihad
- Akjoujt Airport (IATA airport code "AJJ")
- Arakkonam Junction railway station (station code "AJJ")
- American Jiu-Jitsu, fighting style
- Amy Jo Johnson (born 1970), actor

== See also ==
- AJ (disambiguation)
- AAJ (disambiguation)
