= Ajai Kumar =

Indian oncologist and entrepreneur

B S Ajai Kumar
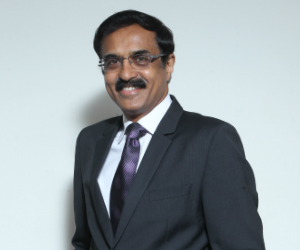
- Born: 22 August 1951 (age 75); Bangalore, India
- Education: St. John’s College, Bangalore, University of Virginia Hospital, MD Anderson Cancer Centre, Houston
- Occupations: Oncologist and entrepreneur
- Known for: Innovation in Cancer care. Value based healthcare model
- Medical career
- Profession: Non-Executive Chairman and founder Healthcare Global Enterprises Ltd.

B S Ajai Kumar (born 22 August 1951) is an Indian oncologist and entrepreneur. He is the founder and executive chairman of HealthCare Global Enterprises Ltd, a South Asian provider of cancer care.

In Feb 2024, HCG sold 54% stakes to KKR, for $400 million while Dr. BS Ajai Kumar will take on a new role as Non-Executive Chairman.

== Career ==
Kumar got his MBBS from St. John's Medical College, Bangalore. He completed his residency at University of Virginia Hospital. Then, he obtained a MD at MD Anderson Hospital in Houston, Texas.

During the course of his career he visited India frequently. In 1989 he founded Bharath Hospital and Institute of Oncology in Mysore, built with grants given by the government of the United States through a non profit trust. He began practising value based medicine, which consists of giving the same treatment at a much lower cost than in the United States and Europe. Then he started the Bangalore Institute of Oncology.

He practised for two decades in USA (he was charged by the Board of Medical Examiners of the State of Iowa with professional incompetence and practice harmful or detrimental to the public; he surrendered his Iowa license to resolve the matters in 2006); in 2003 he decided to return with his family to India, and in 2005 he formed HealthCare Global Enterprises (HCG). introducing new technology for cancer treatment. In 2021 HCG had around 21 comprehensive cancer care centres.

He also partnered with Kamini A. Rao to establish fertility centers in India in 2013.

Kumar is also the President of Association of Healthcare Providers Bangalore and Chapter and Advisor of the Federation of Healthcare Associations. He has given several talks at Harvard Business School and other universities and participates in different health initiatives.

== Awards and achievements ==
- CEO of the Year at the Asian Healthcare Leadership Awards 2014
- 2011 Ernst and Young Entrepreneur of the Year Award.
- CII Regional Emerging Entrepreneurs Award 2011
- BC Roy Award by the Indian Science Monitor.
- Frost & Sullivan Oncology Leader of the Year 2009-2010 and 2010 - 2011.
- HealthCare Global Enterprises became a case study at Harvard Business School for affordable healthcare for the poor in India

== Philanthropy ==
Kumar has established the "International Human Development & Upliftment Academy", near Mysore, Karnataka, which is engaged in alleviating rural illiteracy, empowering women. The HCG Foundation does free cancer treatments for patients from economically backward families.

Antardhwani is an independent Think Tank of HCG which works in health, education and agriculture projects. It also works on anti-tobacco control programmes to fight cancer.

== Books ==
- Excellence Has No Borders (Penguin Random House) - 2019
