= AAJ =

AAJ or Aaj may refer to:

== Arts and media ==
- Aaj (film), a 1987 Indian Hindi-language film directed by Mahesh Bhatt
- AAJ TV, a news television channel in Pakistan
- American Alpine Journal, a publication of the American Alpine Club
- Australian Army Journal, a publication of the Australian Army

== Other uses ==
- American Association for Justice, a U.S. legal organization (formerly Association of Trial Lawyers of America, ATLA)
- Cayana Airstrip in Sipaliwini District, Suriname (IATA airport code AAJ)

== See also ==
- AJJ (disambiguation)
- AJ (disambiguation)
- Aj (newspaper) or Aaj, an Indian newspaper
- Aajkaal, Bengali-language newspaper in Kolkata, India
