= 2012–13 Professional U21 Development League =

The 2012–13 Professional U21 Development League (League 1 referred to as the Barclays Under 21 Premier League for sponsorship reasons ) was the inaugural season of the Professional Development League's U21 competition.

There were 45 participating teams in the 2012–13 Professional U21 Development Leagues; 22 in League 1 and 23 in League 2 (12 in the North Division, 11 in the South Division).

== League 1 ==
Barclays U21 Premier League
- Season: 2012–13
- Champions: Manchester United U21s (1st Title)
- Regular Season Champions: Tottenham Hotspur U21s (1st Title)
- Matches: 284 (280 RS, 4 PO)
- Goals: 868 (3.06 per match) (849 RS, 19 PO)
- Top goalscorer: (England) Jonathan Obika Tottenham Hotspur U21s (18 Goals)
- Biggest home win: Tottenham Hotspur U21s 6-0 Newcastle United U21s (3 November 2012)
- Biggest away win: Stoke City U21s 0–5 Norwich City U21s (11 January 2013)
- Highest scoring: Newcastle U21s 6-4 Tottenham Hotspur U21s (18 August 2012); Stoke City U21s 5–5 Crystal Palace U21s (7 May 2013) (10 Goals)
- Longest winning run: 5 Matches Everton U21s; Liverpool U21s
- Longest unbeaten run: 16 Matches Everton U21s
- Longest winless run: 12 Matches Bolton Wanderers U21s; Stoke City U21s, Sunderland U21s
- Longest losing run: 8 Matches Stoke City U21s
- Highest attendance: 5,600 Arsenal U21s 3–0 Blackburn Rovers U21s (25 August 2012)
- Lowest attendance: 50, 10 Matches

=== First Group Stage ===
The top three teams in Groups 1, the top two teams in Group 2 and 3, and the best third-placed team from Group 2 and 3 will go forward to the Elite Group Stage.

The remaining third-placed team, and the fourth and fifth-placed teams from all three groups, will go forward to Qualification Group Tier One Stage. The sixth and seventh-placed teams, and the eighth-placed team from Group 1, will go forward to the Qualification Group Tier Two Stage.

==== Group 1 ====
===== Table =====
Pos	Team	Pld	W	D	L	GF	GA	GD	Pts	Qualification
1	West Ham United U21s	14	9	1	4	23	14	+9	28	Elite Group Stage
2	Arsenal U21s	14	7	3	4	25	17	+8	24	Elite Group Stage
3	West Bromwich Albion U21s	14	6	3	5	21	21	0	21	Elite Group Stage
4	Everton U21s	14	6	2	6	20	22	−2	20	Qualification Group Tier 1
5	Blackburn Rovers U21s	14	5	4	5	16	17	−1	19	Qualification Group Tier 1
6	Norwich City U21s	14	6	1	7	17	26	−9	19	Qualification Group Tier 2
7	Reading U21s	14	4	6	4	26	20	+6	18	Qualification Group Tier 2
8	Bolton Wanderers U21s	14	1	4	9	11	22	−11	7	Qualification Group Tier 2

===== Results =====
Home \ Away	ARS	BLB	BOL	EVE	NOR	REA	WBA	WHU
Arsenal U21s		3–0	3–1	3–0	1–1	2–0	1–2	1–2
Blackburn Rovers U21s	0–0		0–0	0–1	2–3	2–0	2–0	0–2
Bolton Wanderers U21s	1–2	0–0		1–3	0–1	2–2	0–1	0–1
Everton U21s	1–2	1–2	5–2		2–1	0–0	2–1	1–5
Norwich City U21s	2–4	3–1	2–1	0–2		0–3	1–0	3–1
Reading U21s	2–2	2–4	0–0	1–1	3–0		6–1	3–0
West Bromwich Albion U21s	1–0	2–2	2–1	3–1	4–0	3–3		1–1
West Ham United U21s	4–1	0–1	0–2	1–0	2–0	3–1	1–0	

Updated to match(es) played on unknown. Source: The Premier League
Legend: Blue = home team win; Yellow = draw; Red = away team win.

==== Group 2 ====
===== Table =====
Pos	Team	Pld	W	D	L	GF	GA	GD	Pts	Qualification
1	Tottenham Hotspur U21s	12	7	2	3	43	22	+21	23	Elite Group Stage
2	Manchester United U21s	12	5	5	2	20	16	+4	20	Elite Group Stage
3	Southampton U21s	12	5	4	3	24	22	+2	19	Elite Group Stage
4	Aston Villa U21s	12	5	3	4	21	22	−1	18	Qualification Group Tier 1
5	Sunderland U21s	12	4	5	3	20	16	+4	17	Qualification Group Tier 1
6	Newcastle United U21s	12	4	2	6	28	32	−4	14	Qualification Group Tier 2
7	Stoke City U21s	12	1	1	10	11	37	−26	4	Qualification Group Tier 2

===== Results =====
Home \ Away	AST	MNU	NEW	SOT	STO	SUN	TOT
Aston Villa U21s		0–2	1–2	2–2	3–0	2–1	0–3
Manchester United U21s	0–1		4–2	3–3	1–1	2–2	2–1
Newcastle United U21s	2–3	1–2		0–1	5–1	2–2	6–4
Southampton U21s	3–3	1–1	5–1		0–1	3–2	2–4
Stoke City U21s	2–3	0–1	1–5	1–3		0–1	1–4
Sunderland U21s	2–0	0–0	2–2	0–1	4–1		2–1
Tottenham Hotspur U21s	3–3	4–2	6–0	4–0	7–2	2–2	

Updated to match(es) played on unknown. Source: The Premier League
Legend: Blue = home team win; Yellow = draw; Red = away team win.

==== Group 3 ====
===== Table =====
Pos	Team	Pld	W	D	L	GF	GA	GD	Pts	Qualification
1	Liverpool U21s	12	9	3	0	31	12	+19	30	Elite Group Stage
2	Wolverhampton Wanderers U21s	12	5	4	3	19	21	−2	19	Elite Group Stage
3	Chelsea U21s	12	5	3	4	28	23	+5	18	Qualification Group Tier 1
4	Middlesbrough U21s	12	4	3	5	17	18	−1	15	Qualification Group Tier 1
5	Fulham U21s	12	3	2	7	10	20	−10	11	Qualification Group Tier 1
6	Manchester City EDS	12	1	7	4	15	16	−1	10	Qualification Group Tier 2
7	Crystal Palace U21s	12	2	4	6	15	25	−10	10	Qualification Group Tier 2

===== Results =====
Home \ Away	CHE	CPA	FUL	LIV	MNC	MID	WOL
Chelsea U21s		4–1	3–0	1–4	0–0	1–3	5–0
Crystal Palace U21s	2–2		1–0	1–3	1–1	2–3	1–1
Fulham U21s	3–1	1–4		1–2	1–0	0–0	1–2
Liverpool U21s	3–3	3–1	3–0		2–2	1–0	1–1
Manchester City EDS	2–3	0–0	1–1	1–3		4–0	1–1
Middlesbrough U21s	2–3	4–0	2–0	0–1	2–2		1–4
Wolverhampton Wanderers U21s	3–2	3–1	1–2	1–5	2–1	0–0	

Updated to match(es) played on unknown. Source: The Premier League
Legend: Blue = home team win; Yellow = draw; Red = away team win.

==== Best-placed third-place team ====
Pos	Team	Pld	W	D	L	GF	GA	GD	Pts	Qualification
1	Southampton U21s	12	5	4	3	24	22	+2	19	Elite Group Stage
2	Chelsea U21s	12	5	3	4	28	23	+5	18	Qualification Group Tier 1

=== Second phase ===
==== Elite Group ====
===== Table =====
Pos	Team	Pld	W	D	L	GF	GA	GD	Pts	Qualification
1	Tottenham Hotspur U21s (Q)	14	9	3	2	34	15	+19	30	Knockout Stage Semi-final
2	Manchester United U21s (Q)	14	7	4	3	16	10	+6	25	Knockout Stage Semi-final
3	Liverpool U21s (Q)	14	6	4	4	21	19	+2	22	Knockout Stage Semi-final
4	Southampton U21s	14	5	5	4	21	18	+3	20	
5	Arsenal U21s	14	4	5	5	21	23	−2	17	
6	West Ham United U21s	14	4	4	6	19	22	−3	16	
7	Wolverhampton Wanderers U21s	14	3	3	8	19	28	−9	12	
8	West Bromwich Albion U21s	14	2	4	8	10	26	−16	10	

Source: The Premier League
Rules for classification: 1) points; 2) goal difference; 3) number of goals scored.
(Q) Qualified for the phase indicated

===== Results =====
Home \ Away	ARS	MNU	LIV	SOT	TOT	WHU	WBA	WOL
Arsenal U21s		2–1	1–1	2–0	0–1	0–2	1–1	2–1
Manchester United U21s	2–2		1–1	1–0	1–0	2–0	1–0	0–0
Liverpool U21s	3–2	0–1		1–0	1–3	3–3	2–0	3–2
Southampton U21s	2–1	1–3	1–1		0–0	5–2	2–0	2–0
Tottenham Hotspur U21s	4–2	3–1	1–0	2–2		3–2	4–0	5–1
West Ham United U21s	1–1	0–0	2–1	0–1	1–1		2–0	3–2
West Bromwich Albion U21s	2–2	0–2	1–2	3–3	0–4	1–0		1–0
Wolverhampton Wanderers U21s	2–3	1–0	1–2	2–2	4–3	2–1	1–1	

Updated to match(es) played on unknown. Source: The Premier League
Legend: Blue = home team win; Yellow = draw; Red = away team win.

==== Qualification Group Tier 1 ====
===== Table =====
Pos	Team	Pld	W	D	L	GF	GA	GD	Pts	Qualification
1	Everton U21s (Q)	12	6	6	0	17	8	+9	24	Knockout Stage Play-off
2	Aston Villa U21s	12	5	4	3	17	12	+5	19	
3	Fulham U21s	12	5	4	3	16	12	+4	19	
4	Chelsea U21s	12	5	2	5	11	11	0	17	
5	Middlesbrough U21s	12	4	4	4	15	13	+2	16	
6	Blackburn Rovers U21s	12	4	0	8	11	20	−9	12	
7	Sunderland U21s	12	0	6	6	9	20	−11	6	

Updated to match(es) played on 1 May 2013. Source: The Premier League
Rules for classification: 1) points; 2) goal difference; 3) number of goals scored.
(Q) Qualified for the phase indicated

===== Results =====
Home \ Away	AST	BLB	CHE	EVE	FUL	MID	SUN
Aston Villa U21s		2–0	1–1	0–0	0–2	1–3	3–1
Blackburn Rovers U21s	0–2		2–1	0–3	1–3	0–1	2–1
Chelsea U21s	1–2	1–0		0–1	2–0	3–2	1–0
Everton U21s	2–2	3–2	0–0		1–1	2–0	0–0
Fulham U21s	2–0	0–1	1–0	0–1		1–0	2–2
Middlesbrough U21s	0–0	3–1	2–0	1–2	2–2		0–0
Sunderland U21s	0–4	0–2	0–1	2–2	2–2	1–1	

Updated to match(es) played on 30 April 2013. Source: The Premier League
Legend: Blue = home team win; Yellow = draw; Red = away team win.

==== Qualification Group Tier 2 ====
===== Table =====
Pos	Team	Pld	W	D	L	GF	GA	GD	Pts	Qualification
1	Newcastle United U21s (Q)	12	6	4	2	21	13	+8	22	Knockout Stage Play-off
2	Bolton Wanderers U21s	12	6	4	2	18	14	+4	22	
3	Reading U21s	12	6	2	4	15	11	+4	20	
4	Norwich City U21s	12	5	2	5	18	14	+4	17	
5	Manchester City EDS	12	4	4	4	24	22	+2	16	
6	Crystal Palace U21s	12	2	5	5	21	29	−8	11	
7	Stoke City U21s	12	2	1	9	14	28	−14	7	

Updated to match(es) played on 7 May 2013. Source: The Premier League
Rules for classification: 1) points; 2) goal difference; 3) number of goals scored.
(Q) Qualified for the phase indicated

===== Results =====
Home \ Away	BOL	CPA	MNC	NEW	NOR	REA	STO
Bolton Wanderers U21s		2–2	1–1	1–1	0–1	1–0	0–2
Crystal Palace U21s	0–1		1–1	2–2	1–5	2–0	1–2
Manchester City EDS	3–3	3–4		1–2	3–1	3–1	4–1
Newcastle United U21s	1–2	4–0	1–1		2–0	0–3	3–0
Norwich City U21s	0–2	1–1	3–2	1–2		0–1	1–0
Reading U21s	1–2	3–2	3–0	1–1	0–0		1–0
Stoke City U21s	2–3	5–5	1–2	1–2	0–5	0–1	

Updated to match(es) played on unknown. Source: The Premier League
Legend: Blue = home team win; Yellow = draw; Red = away team win.

=== Knockout stage ===
The teams finishing first in the two Qualification Groups played each other to decide who makes the semi-final against the winner of the Elite Group Stage.

The teams finishing second and third in the Elite Group Stage played in the other semi-final.

Play-off
May 7
Everton U21s	3 (5)
Newcastle United U21s	3 (3)

Semi-final
Tottenham Hotspur U21s	3
Everton U21s	2
Manchester United U21s	3
Liverpool U21s	0

Final
Tottenham Hotspur U21s	2
Manchester United U21s	3

==== Play-off ====
7 May 2013
17:00 BST

Everton U21s	3 – 3 (a.e.t.)	Newcastle United U21s
McAleny 69'; Naismith 77'; Lundstram 115'		Ameobi 66'; Inman 83'; Richardson 98'
Penalties
Stones (penalty scored); Duffus (penalty scored); Barkley (penalty scored); Garbutt (penalty scored); Oviedo (penalty scored)	5–3	(penalty missed) Bigirimana; (penalty scored) Tavernier; (penalty scored) Ameobi; (penalty scored) Inman

Goodison Park, Liverpool
Referee: Michael Salisbury

==== Semi-final ====
13 May 2013
17:00 BST

Tottenham Hotspur U21s	3 – 2	Everton U21s
Pritchard 11'; Obika 46', 88'		McAleny 45+2'; Long 48'

White Hart Lane, Tottenham
Attendance: 887
Referee: Wayne Porter
14 May 2013
17:00 BST

Manchester United U21s	3 – 0	Liverpool U21s
Cole 19' (pen.), 26' (pen.), 70'

Old Trafford, Manchester
Attendance: 2,750
Referee: Matthew Walsh

==== Final ====
20 May 2013
17:00 BST

Manchester United U21s	3 – 2	Tottenham Hotspur U21s
Vermijl 59'; Cole 74', 88'		Obika 29'; Pritchard 42'

Old Trafford, Manchester
Attendance: 5,186
Referee: Robert Madley

== League 2 ==
Professional U21 Development League 2
- Season: 2012–13
- Champions: Charlton Athletic U21s (1st Title)
- Regular Season Champions: Leicester City U21s (1st Title)
- Matches: 245 (242 RS, 3 PO)
- Goals: 827 (3.38 per match) (811 RS, 16 PO)
- Biggest home win: Queens Park Rangers U21s 8–2 Colchester United U21s (17 December 2012), Crewe Alexandra U21s 6–0 Barnsley U21s (15 April 2013)
- Biggest away win: Barnet U21s 1–8 Queens Park Rangers U21s (18 February 2013)
- Highest scoring: Queens Park Rangers U21s 8–2 Colchester United U21s (17 December 2012)
- Longest winless run: 14 Barnet U21s

=== Group stage ===
==== North division ====
Pos	Team	Pld	W	D	L	GF	GA	GD	Pts	Qualification
1	Leicester City U21s	22	14	5	3	52	28	+24	47	Knockout stage
2	Huddersfield Town U21s	22	12	4	6	36	28	+8	40	Knockout stage
3	Derby County U21s	22	11	4	7	32	31	+1	37	
4	Nottingham Forest U21s	22	10	5	7	24	25	−1	35	
5	Birmingham City U21s	22	9	5	8	36	30	+6	32	
6	Leeds United U21s	22	8	6	8	39	35	+4	30	
7	Crewe Alexandra U21s	22	7	7	8	40	36	+4	28	
8	Sheffield United U21s	22	7	6	9	28	30	−2	27	
9	Coventry City U21s	22	8	3	11	30	37	−7	27	
10	Wigan Athletic U21s	22	6	7	9	34	37	−3	25	
11	Sheffield Wednesday U21s	22	6	5	11	35	42	−7	23	
12	Barnsley U21s	22	3	5	14	27	54	−27	14	

==== South division ====
Pos	Team	Pld	W	D	L	GF	GA	GD	Pts	Qualification
1	Charlton Athletic U21s	20	13	3	4	47	24	+23	42	Knockout stage
2	Cardiff City U21s	20	14	0	6	41	29	+12	42	Knockout stage
3	Brighton & Hove Albion U21s	20	12	4	4	38	22	+16	40	
4	Brentford U21s	20	12	2	6	45	34	+11	38	
5	Queens Park Rangers U21s	20	11	3	6	44	30	+14	36	
6	Bristol City U21s	20	10	0	10	36	35	+1	30	
7	Ipswich Town U21s	20	9	2	9	35	35	0	29	
8	Swansea City U21s	20	7	1	12	27	33	−6	22	
9	Colchester United U21s	20	5	2	13	36	62	−26	17	
10	Millwall U21s	20	4	2	14	27	42	−15	14	
11	Barnet U21s	20	2	3	15	22	52	−30	9	

=== Knockout stage ===
The teams finishing first in each division will play a semi-final against the runners-up of the opposite division, with the winners of each semi-final contesting a final to crown the overall champions of the combined League.

Semi-final
Leicester City	2
Cardiff City	3

Final

==== Semifinals ====
7 May 2013
13:00 GMT

Charlton Athletic U21s	6–1	Huddersfield Town U21s
Pigott 10', 52', 68', 84'; Azeez 17'; Smith 83'	Report	Crooks 45'

Sparrows Lane Training Ground, London

7 May 2013

Leicester City U21s	2–3	Cardiff City U21s
Taft 15'; Dodoo 63'	Report	McGinty 28' (o.g.); Oshilaja 79', 86'

King Power Stadium, Leicester

==== Final ====
11 May 2013

Cardiff City U21s	1–3 (a.e.t.)	Charlton Athletic U21s
Kiss 14'	Report	Smith 1'; Pigott 115'; Azeez 116'

Cardiff City Stadium, Cardiff
Attendance: 2,312

== See also ==
- 2012–13 FA Youth Cup
- 2012–13 Premier League
- 2012–13 in English football
