= Ajay K. Pandey =

Indian romance novel author

Ajay Pandey
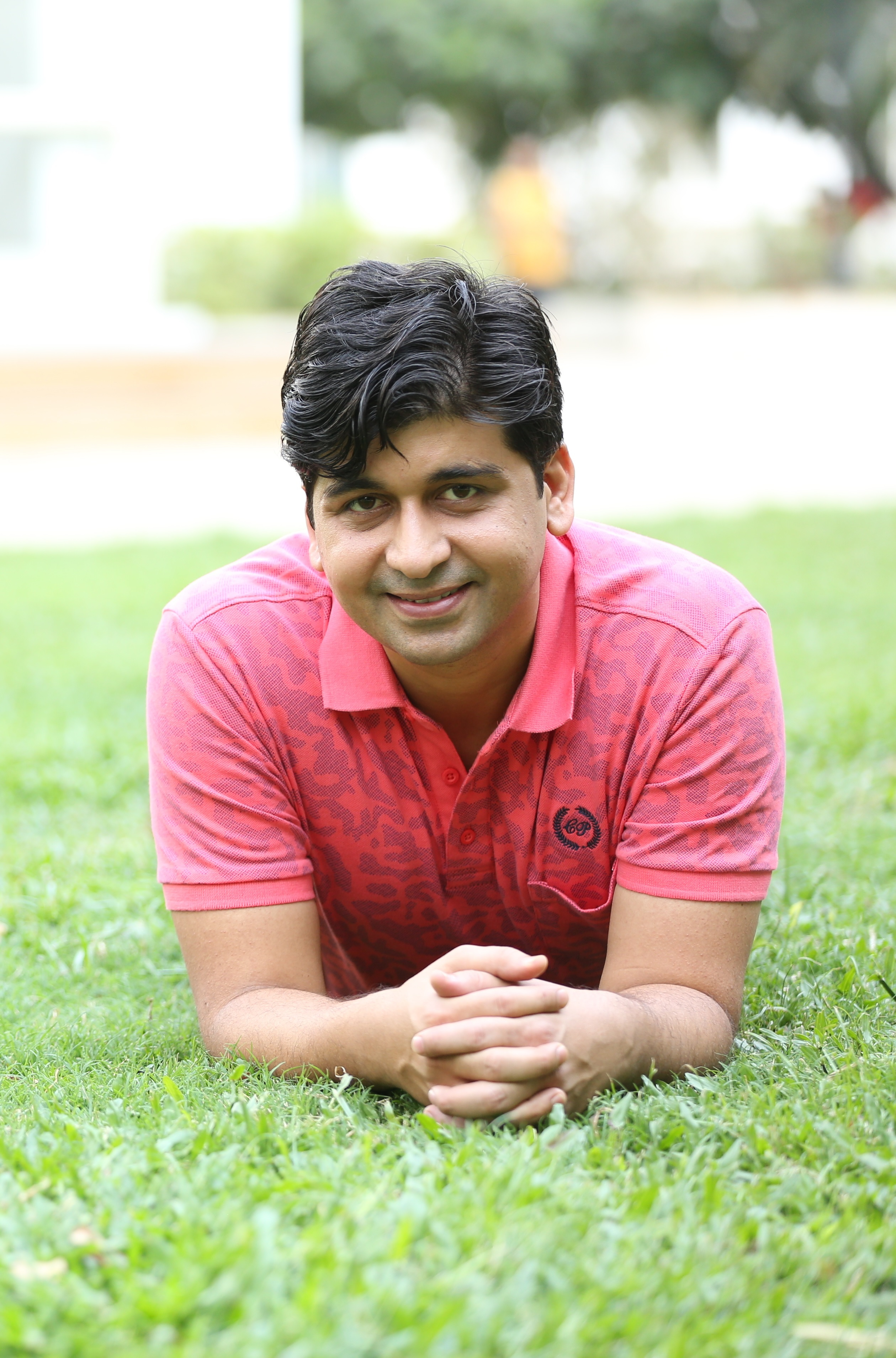
- Born: 8 July 1984 (age 42); Uttar Pradesh, India
- Occupation: Author
- Known for: novelist
- Notable work: You Are The Best Wife

Ajay Pandey, also known as Ajay K. Pandey, is an Indian author of romance novels. His books include You are the Best Wife, You are the Best Friend, A Girl to Remember. His first book was You are the Best Wife.

== Career ==
Pandey was born in Uttar Pradesh. He is an engineer for a Pune-based company, Cognizant. His first book as an author was You are the Best Wife which was released in 2015. After the success of this book, he wrote Her Last Wish.

== Books ==
- You are the Best Wife
- You are the Best Friend
- Her Last Wish
- A Girl to Remember
- An Unexpected Gift
- Everything I never told you
- The girl in the red lipstick
- I Wish I Could Tell Her
