= Ajay Nayyar =

British-Indian actor (born 1982)

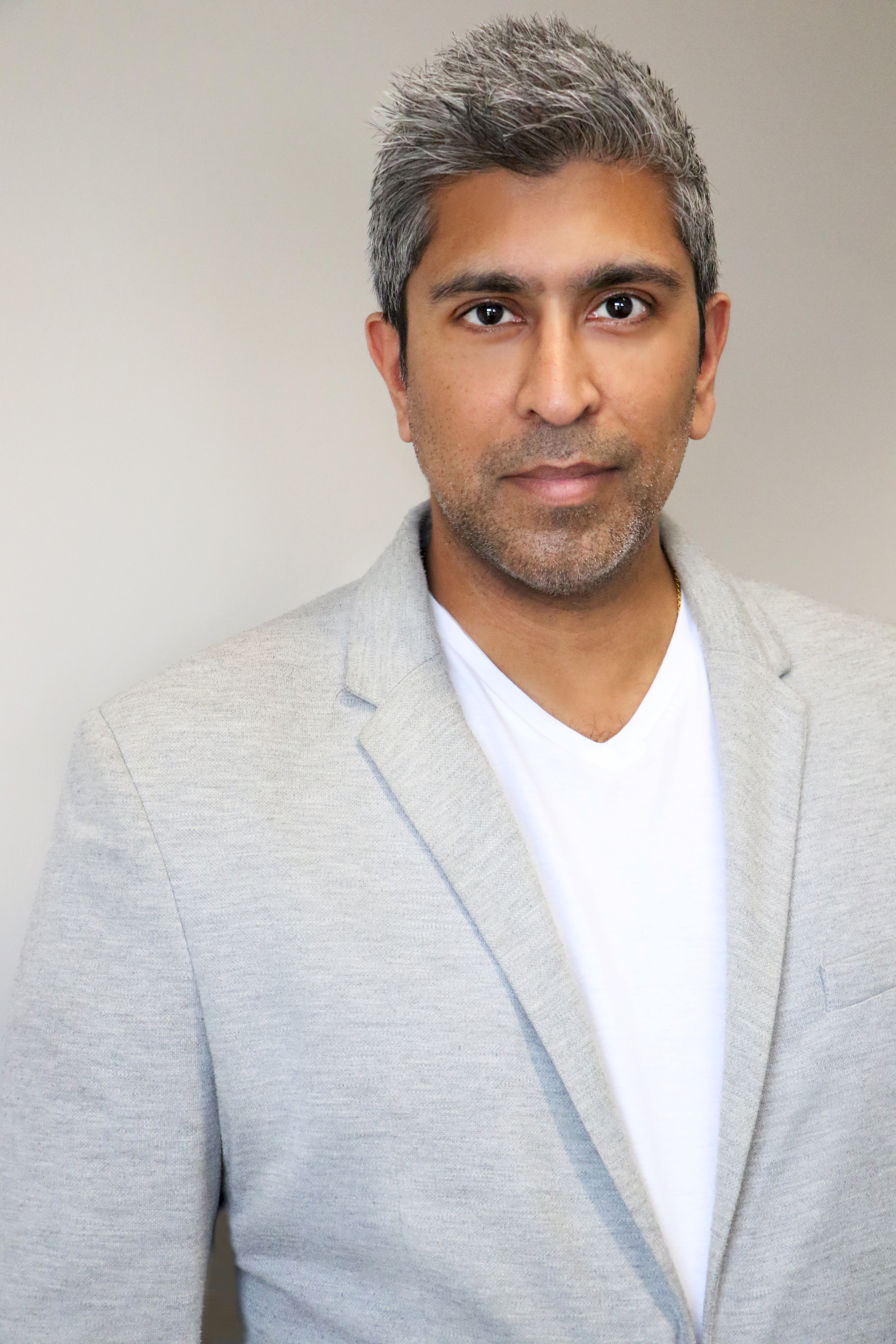
- Ajay Nayyar official publicity shot
- Born: Ajay Pratap Singh Nayyar; 21 September 1982 (age 43); Middlesex, England
- Occupations: Actor, Director, Producer
- Years active: 2008–present

Ajay Pratap Singh Nayyar (born 21 September 1982) is a British-Indian film, television and stage actor, producer and director.

Ajay featured in two TV shows in 2009, the Fox thriller drama series 24 and the CBS series NCIS and also starred in a feature film titled Rejouer playing the role of a music producer. This independent feature was the first film to be entirely shot with an HDSLR camera. Originally, Ajay auditioned for the small role of a news reporter, only to be offered a leading role as a music producer. The script was, in turn, rewritten for him to play this role. Two US national commercials for The Hartford, and Subway (restaurant) were to follow in his blossoming acting career. His dream is to, one day, be able to work with his idol, for most of his life, Al Pacino.

His passion for the industry has since grown immensely and he decided he didn't want to restrict himself to just acting, realising his potential as a producer. His finance background helped a great deal with this and in 2010, he formed Khando Entertainment in London.

== Early life ==
Ajay was born in Middlesex, England on 21 September 1982, to parents of Indian origin. The entertainment industry was a large part in his life from as young as age 3, watching films and going to the theatre continuously. He started acting himself at age 5 in local theatres, and also put on plays for the neighbours with his sister and one of her friends. This fueled his desire to be a part of entertaining. After studying drama at school, he acquired an immense passion for the art and went on to star in some commercials and did a variety of acting work as well as some modeling.

His main profession was, however, in the finance industry having studied business and finance at Kingston University. Working as an independent financial adviser the lure of acting and the entertainment industry in general was too tempting and so in March 2008 he pursued an acting career Los Angeles. He participated in intensive acting classes in his first 8 months of living there and began auditioning for casting directors almost immediately after. Ajay is the third cousin far removed of the Big Bang Theory actor Kunal Nayyar.

== Career ==
=== Acting ===
==== 2008–2010 ====
Ajay appeared in the short film Men Will Be Boys in 2008. He also wrote and directed this film. In 2009 he had an uncredited role in the Hannah Montana film as the concert guy. It was also in 2009 that he appeared in the TV programmes NCIS: Naval Criminal Investigative Services and Surviving Disaster.

In 2010 Ajay appeared in 8 episodes of the popular TV series 24 as a worker at CTU.

==== 2011 ====
In June 2011, Ajay played the lead role of Prince Lev Nikolayevich Myshkin in a stage adaptation of 19th century Russian author Fyodor Dostoyevsky's novel The Idiot. Later in the year, Ajay will be appeared in the feature film Rejouer as Nikesh Rose.

=== Producing ===
As well as with his work at Khando Entertainment, Ajay has been sought after by many writers and producers looking for his insight and knowledge of the entertainment industry. He has produced a number of projects as well as winning multiple awards along the way

=== Writer ===
Ajay wrote the screenplay for the short film Men Will Be Boys in 2008.
