= Ajay Navaria =

Indian writer

- Born: 1972 (age 53–54)
- Occupation: Short story author
- Period: 1975 - 2013
- Subject: Dalit experiences
- Notable works: Patkatha aur Anya Kahaniya (2006); Yes Sir (2012); Udhar ke Log (2008); Unclaimed Terrain (2013) - English translation of selected stories

Ajay Navaria (born 1972, Delhi) is an Indian writer and scholar, born in Dausa, Rajasthan, India. Navaria's work is specifically in the genre of short stories and novels. He currently holds the position of Professor of Hindi Literature at Jamia Millia Islamia in New Delhi.

== Education and Early Career ==
Navaria commenced his academic career by teaching Hindu religious scripture and ethics. He later pursued higher education at Jawaharlal Nehru University (JNU), where he completed his M.Phil. and Ph.D. His literary journey began with the publication of his first story, "Kohra" (Fog), in 1995.

== Literary Works ==
Ajay Navaria has authored two collections of Hindi short stories: "Patkatha aur Anya Kahaniya" (2006) and "Yes Sir" (2012). Additionally, he has penned a novel titled "Udhar ke Log" (2009). Navaria gained international acclaim with the release of "Unclaimed Terrain" in 2013, an anthology of his stories translated into English by Laura Brueck. He has been associated with the premier Hindi literary journal, Hans

One of Navaria's widely discussed stories is "New Custom," based on a real incident involving his father. The narrative addresses the practice of untouchability, specifically the expectation for Dalits to wash their own cups at roadside stalls. Another well-known story, "Yes Sir," explores the dynamics between a Dalit civil servant and a Brahmin peon, delving into imagined scenarios to examine caste relations.

== Notable works ==
- Patkatha aur Anya Kahaniya (2006)
- Yes Sir (2012)
- Udhar ke Log (2008)
- Unclaimed Terrain (2013) - English translation of selected stories
