= Ajay Kalsi =

Indian billionaire businessman

- Born: October 1960 (age 64)
- Citizenship: Indian
- Education: The Scindia School, Gwalior
- Alma mater: London School of Economics (BSc); University of Cambridge (MPhil)
- Occupation: Businessman
- Known for: Founder and CEO, Indus Gas
- Board member of: Indus Gas
- Spouse: Married
- Children: 2
- Website: www.indusgas.com

Ajay Kalsi (born October 1960) is an Indian billionaire businessman, the owner of a range of companies in oil and gas, footwear, commodity trading, real estate and business process outsourcing.

== Early life ==
Ajay Kalsi was born in October 1960, educated at the Scindia School, and received a bachelor's degree in economics from the London School of Economics followed by a master's degree in economics from Cambridge University.

== Career ==
Kalsi inherited a shoe business in Kanpur, India from his family.

Kalsi founded Indus Gas, and is its CEO. He is the chairman of Focus Energy Limited. He has been a director of Indus Gas since April 2008 and is a director of Focus Energy Limited. Kalsi was a director of Phoenix International Ltd from April to December 2006. He is a member of the World Economic Forum, where he has been designated a "Global Leader of Tomorrow".

As of November 2011, Kalsi and his wife owned 70% of Indus Gas, having sold 30% in January 2011, following a listing on London's Alternate Investment Market.

As of March 2015, Kalsi's net worth is estimated to be $1.2 billion, according to Forbes.

== Personal life ==
Kalsi is married and lives in Delhi, India. In 2011, he was building a new wave pool for his daughter, the size of four Olympic swimming pools.
