= Errol Mundle-Smith =

English footballer (born 2006)

Personal information
- Full name: Errol Isaiah O'Neil Mundle-Smith
- Date of birth: 19 March 2006 (age 20)
- Place of birth: Lewisham, England
- Height: 6 ft 2 in (1.89 m)
- Positions: Winger; forward

Team information
- Current team: Norwich City
- Number: 46

Youth career
- 2021–2023: Kinetic Foundation
- 2023–2025: Norwich City

Senior career*
Years	Team	Apps	(Gls)
2023	Croydon	8	(3)
2025–	Norwich City	13	(0)

International career^{‡}
2026–	England U20	1	(0)
- * Club domestic league appearances and goals as of 07:20, 7 May 2026 (UTC) ‡ National team caps and goals as of 23:46, 31 March 2026 (UTC)

Errol Isaiah O'Neil Mundle-Smith (born 19 March 2006) is an English professional footballer who plays as a winger or forward for EFL Championship club Norwich City.

== Career ==
After playing with Kinetic Foundation in South London from 2021, Mundle-Smith played for Southern Counties East Football League club Croydon in 2023, and signed for Norwich City's academy in September 2023. He signed his first professional contract with Norwich in summer 2024, and made his first-team debut on 1 November 2025 as a substitute in a 2–0 home defeat to Hull City.

== International career ==
On 27 March 2026, Mundle-Smith made his England U20 debut during a 3-3 draw away to Italy.

== Style of play ==
Mundle-Smith has played as a striker for Norwich's youth sides, but much of his involvement for the first-team has come as a winger.

== Career statistics ==
As of match played 2 May 2026

Appearances and goals by club, season and competition
Club	Season	League			FA Cup		EFL Cup		Other		Total	
Club	Season	Division	Apps	Goals	Apps	Goals	Apps	Goals	Apps	Goals	Apps	Goals
Croydon	2022–23	SCEL Division One	8	3	0	0	0	0	0	0	8	3
Norwich City	2025–26	Championship	13	0	2	0	0	0	0	0	15	0
Career total			21	3	2	0	0	0	0	0	23	3
