= Ajay Jha =

Indian cricketer

Personal information
- Full name: Ajay Kumar Jha
- Born: 1956
- Died: 28 August 2013 (aged 57); Bangalore, Karnataka, India
- Batting: Right-handed
- Bowling: Right-arm fast-medium
- Role: Bowler

Domestic team information
- Years: Team
- 1974/75–1975/76: Bihar
- 1977/78–1986/87: Services

Career statistics
Competition	FC	List A
Matches	52	9
Runs scored	880	48
Batting average	13.33	12.00
100s/50s	0/5	0/0
Top score	78	25
Balls bowled	8,611	402
Wickets	159	10
Bowling average	30.18	25.50
5 wickets in innings	9	0
10 wickets in match	0	n/a
Best bowling	6/76	2/24
Catches/stumpings	20/–	2/–
- Source: ESPNcricinfo, 15 March 2016

Ajay Kumar Jha (1956 – 28 August 2013) was an Indian first-class cricketer who represented Bihar and Services.

== Life and career ==
Jha was a right-arm fast-medium bowler who appeared in 52 first-class and 9 List A matches. He represented Bihar for two seasons during 1974/75–1975/76, before turning out for Services from 1977/78 to 1986/87. He took 159 first-class wickets at an average of about 30 including 9 five-wicket hauls. He also made appearances for North Zone and Indian Board President's XI.

Jha continued to be associated with cricket after his playing career. He worked as the chief administrative officer of the National Cricket Academy in Bangalore, before being sacked from the position in August 2013. He had previously worked for the Indian Air Force as wing commander.

On 28 August 2013, Jha died of a heart attack, at the age of 57, while playing golf in Bangalore.
