= Zach Baumann =

Ukrainian footballer (born 2007)

Personal information
- Full name: Zachary Joseph Baumann
- Date of birth: 2 January 2007 (age 19)
- Place of birth: Bolton, England
- Height: 1.85 m (6 ft 1 in)
- Position: Midfielder

Team information
- Current team: Norwich City
- Number: 52

Youth career
- 2012–2025: Manchester United
- 2025–: Norwich City

Senior career*
Years	Team	Apps	(Gls)
2026–	Norwich City	0	(0)

International career^{‡}
2024–2025	Ukraine U19	7	(0)
- * Club domestic league appearances and goals ‡ National team caps and goals as of 11 November 2025

Zachary Joseph Baumann (Ukrainian: Зак Бауманн; born 2 January 2007) is a professional footballer who plays as a midfielder for EFL Championship club Norwich City. Born in England, he is a Ukraine youth international.

== Early life ==
Baumann was born on 2 January 2007 in Bolton, England. Born to Ukrainian parents from Kolomyia, Ukraine, he can speak Ukrainian and has a brother.

== Club career ==
As a youth player, Baumann joined the youth academy of English Premier League side Manchester United (whom he signed for the age of 5 in 2012), helping the club's under-18 team win the league title and the 2023–24 U18 Premier League Cup. During the 2023–24 season, he was promoted to their reserve team and started training with their senior team.

On 1 September 2025, he signed for EFL Championship club Norwich City on a contract until 2027 with a club option for a further year.

== International career ==
Baumann is a Ukraine youth international. During November 2024, he played for the Ukraine national under-19 football team for 2025 UEFA European Under-19 Championship qualification.

== Style of play ==
Baumann plays as a midfielder and is right-footed. Ukrainian news website Sport.ua wrote in 2024 that "his strengths are a good vision of the field, the ability to make decisions, initiative in working with the ball, good technique and physical data, as well as moderately expressed aggressiveness, which helps the team when pressing".

== Honours ==
Manchester United U18

- Professional Development League: 2023–24
