= Ajai Kumar Srivastava =

Indian judge

Ajai Kumar Srivastava is an Indian judge who is serving as the Sitting Judge due to superannuate on 31 May 2025 and is the former Registrar general of Allahabad High Court.

== Personal life ==
He was born on 1 June 1963 in Gorakhpur and became Judge in March 2021 and will retire in 2025.
