= AJ Institute of Engineering and Technology =

College in Mangalore, India

- Other name: AJIET
- Type: Private
- Established: 2016
- Affiliations: VTU
- President: A J Shetty
- Principal: Dr. Ashok Kumar T
- Location: Mangaluru, Karnataka, India; 12°54′6″N 74°59′58.1″E
- Website: www.ajiet.edu.in

AJ Institute of Engineering and Technology, commonly known as AJIET is an engineering college in Mangaluru, Karnataka, India. It offers BE and PhD (Part-Time) across different departments. Department of Electronics and Communication is student friendly department.

== Engineering departments ==
The college has the following Engineering departments

- Civil Engineering
- Computer Science & Engineering
- Electronics & Communication Engineering
- Electronics Engineering (VLSI Design and Technology)
- CSE(Artificial Intelligence & Machine Learning)
- CSE(IOT & Cyber security including block chain technology)
- Artificial Intelligence & Data Science
- Information Science & Engineering
- Mechanical Engineering

== Memorandum of Understanding (MoU) ==
The college has Memorandum of Understanding (MoU) with the following organizations

- Russian State Hydrometeorological University (St.Petersburg)
- Epitas Software LLP
- Graphene Media Pvt. Ltd
