= Ajay Vinze =

American business professor

Ajay S. Vinzé
- Occupations: professor, academic administrator
- Known for: Dean of the Trulaske College of Business
- Title: Robert J. Trulaske, Sr. Dean and Professor

Academic background
- Education: University of Arizona; University of Connecticut; University of Delhi
- Doctoral advisor: Jay F. Nunamaker

Academic work
- Institutions: University of Missouri; Arizona State University; Texas A&M University
- Website: https://business.missouri.edu/ajay-vinze

Ajay S. Vinzé is an American professor and academic administrator. He is the Dean of the business school at George Mason University. Previously, he was the dean of and professor in the Robert J. Trulaske, Sr. College of Business at the University of Missouri. Vinzé started his tenure at the Trulaske College of Business in January 2017.

== Early life and education ==
Vinzé received his Bachelor of Commerce at the University of Delhi in 1980. In 1982 he received his MBA in Finance from the University of Connecticut. He was awarded his PhD in Business Administration, Management Information Systems (MIS) from the University of Arizona in 1988.

== Career ==
Vinzé started his professional career as an IT Consultant with SGV and Co. in Manila, Philippines. Then after a stint at India-Phil Textiles in Bureau Philippines he reverted to academia. After completing his PhD at the University of Arizona he joined the faculty of the Mays School of Business at Texas A&M [PLA1] (1988-1998). He then moved to the W.P. Carey School of Business at Arizona State University [PLA2] where he also worked as an administrator.
