= Humanistic medicine =

Humanistic medicine is an interdisciplinary field in the medical practice of clinical care popular in the modern health systems of developed countries.

== Problems facing healthcare ==
In many countries with modern healthcare systems, healthcare systems are facing enormous difficulties in meeting demands given limited healthcare budgets. Healthcare professionals often experience high levels of stress and burnout. Health professionals facing a large number of patients are not giving individual patients the care they want, resulting in a very high number of patients seeking alternative treatments and rejecting vaccinations for their children. The rising costs of medical services and medication are becoming unaffordable for many patients, preventing these individuals from receiving adequate healthcare without spending a large percentage of their disposable income. Studies have shown that poor doctor-patient relationships result in frequent lawsuits against healthcare providers. These lawsuits have become a major burden to medical personnel and have risen in both number and cost in developed nations.

== Practice ==
Among the approaches used to encourage the practice of a more humane medicine are narrative medicine and patient empowerment. Narrative medicine is a way of educating physicians, nurses and other providers that uses storytelling (and active listening) to emphasize the humanity of patient and provider, enabling the "physician to practice medicine with empathy, reflection, professionalism, and trustworthiness." Patient empowerment seeks to create an equal partnership between doctors and their patients, placing values at the center of the healthcare encounter. Both of the practices emphasize the importance of the human experience in the practice of medicine, and help to ensure that the humanity of the patient is not obscured in a morass of lab results, patient charts, and insurance regulations. Humanistic medicine strives to create ideal and balanced care that sacrifices neither cutting-edge science nor the gentle art of creating a caring relationship. Various health professional schools across the U.S. have begun to integrate humanistic medical teaching into their curricula in an effort to offset what some view as an over-emphasis on medical technology to the detriment of individual patient care.

== Criticism ==
It is not widely accepted that "humanistic medicine" refers to a belief or set of practices that differ significantly from the biopsychosocial model of care. Further, many of the terms used by its advocates such as "soul" and "spiritual" are not well defined or specifically explored experimentally as much as these approaches contribute to patient welfare beyond those employed by the biopsychosocial model.
