= Ajai P Mangattu =

Indian writer

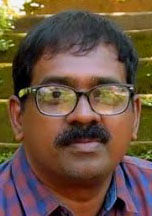
- Born: Idukki, Kerala, India
- Education: Maharaja's College, Ernakulam
- Occupations: Novelist, short story writer, columnist
- Spouse: Manju
- Children: Vajra and son Ameya
- Writing career
- Language: Malayalam
- Years active: 1998 – present
- Notable work: Susannayude Grandhappura (Susannah's house of books) – novel

Ajai P Mangattu is a writer in Malayalam, from Kerala, India. He is a novelist, literary critic and journalist. He lives in Kochi with his wife Manju, daughter Vajra and son Ameya. He was born in 1972 in a small mountainous village in Idukki district Kerala. His parental home is situated at Vellathooval, close to Munnar. It was a farming community, who migrated from lower lands. His father Pakhrudheen, who was a newspaper agent for three decades, had run a bakery at Vellathooval and Ajai's mother Meera worked at home. He was the eldest of three children. The other two a brother and sister both now settled at Adimali, a town near to Vellathooval. He completed his school education at Vellathooval GHS (now GHSS) and after the SSC, went to Moolamattom St Joseph's College where he completed his Pre degree.

== Career ==
He studied B A at Mar Athanasius College, Kothamangalam and M A in English language and Literature at Maharaja's College, Ernakulam later took a PG Diploma in Journalism and Communication from Kerala Media Academy In 1998, Ajai joined Malayala Manorama as a Sub editor trainee. Presently he is Assistant Editor with the same media house. Ajai has been writing literary prose and critical studies in major journals and magazines in Malayalam for the last 25 years and he has published books on various subjects. He wrote a biography on Noam Chomsky, his first published book, his first collection essays followed. He translated Gail Omvedt 's book on the life of Ambedkar into Malayalam and Derrida's Islam and West. He co translated Elif Shafak's novel Forty Rules of love, which is forthcoming His first novel Susannayude Grandhapura published in 2019 and sold 15 editions in less than 9 months.

== Literary works ==
- Susanna's Granthapura [= Susanna's house of book; original title in Malayalam: Sūsannayuṭe granthappura], a novel, translated by Catherine Thankamma. Gurugram, Haryana, India : Penguin/Viking, an imprint of Penguin Random House, 2023.
- It 's not the End of the World - literary essays
- The freedom of Birds- essays
- A Chronicle of Solitude- a biography of Gabriel Garcia Marquez
- Noam Chomsky: An Intellectual
- Biography B R Ambedkar: Towards an Enlightened India-Gail
- Omvedt - Translation Night by Elie Wiesel - Translation Islam and West by Derrida - translation
