= Ajai Wildlife Reserve =

Wildlife reserve located in Arua, Uganda

- Ajai's Island
- IUCN category III (natural monument or feature)
- Location within Uganda
- Nearest city: Arua
- Coordinates: 2°52′N 31°17′E
- Area: 148 km^{2} (57 sq mi)
- Established: 1965

The Ajai Wildlife Reserve is a small conservation protected area in North Western Uganda dominated by a large island surrounded by seasonally flooded swamps and wooded savanna.

== Location ==
Ajai lies on the western bank of the White Nile, approximately 40 km (25 mi) east of Arua.

== History ==
Historically, Ajai Game Reserve was only declared in limited area of 4 square Kilometers as a Game Sanctuary by the British Government in 1937. Prior to this, the former President Theodore Roosevelt of the United States of America (USA) had visited in King Ajai's palace during his African expedition in 1910. During President Roosevelt's expedition he hunted several White Rhino's which drastically reduced the number of White Rhinos in the reserve. Five years later, approximately 1915, King Ajai started supervising hunting in the area. Ajai's efforts later led to the declaration of a controlled area about 4 square kilometers by the government in 1937. The area declared a sanctuary was part of King Ajai's palace and didn't extend beyond.

Northern white rhinoceros had historically been plentiful in northern Uganda west of the Nile River. In the face of rising concerns of over-hunting in the 1920's, Uganda introduced licensing requirements for hunting the species. As the population continued to decline, with estimates dropping from 150 to 80 in just three years, conservation efforts increased. The Uganda Game Department relocated 15 rhinos from the territory of present-day Obongi District southwards to Murchison Falls National Park in 1961 and 1964. In 1965 the Game Department gazetted the Ajai Game Reserve, aiming to protect the dwindling resident rhino population, then estimated at around 50 animals. In 1962 the nascent World Wildlife Fund made its first rhino conservation grant, supporting the East African Wild Life Society with $56,000 ($596,040 in 2025) to combat poaching and smuggling of rhino horn from the West Nile and Madi districts, including in Ajai.

Conservation enforcement was subordinated to power struggles of successive dictatorships beginning in 1966, especially the Uganda-Tanzania War. This led wildlife populations all around the newly-independent Uganda to collapse under the pressures of land-use conflict and poaching. The rhino population of Ajai was extinguished in 1979.

In 2002 Uganda Wildlife Authority began efforts to enlarge the boundaries of the reserve with a view of later re-introducing the White Rhino's into the reserve following years of the surviving Rhinos being kept at the Ziwa Rhino Sanctuary. In 2022 the UWA Board of Trustees voted to move animals from Ziwa to Ajai.

In 2008 the Uganda Wildlife Authority contracted with Uganda Wildlife Safaris Limited, a private hunting and photographic tour operator, to develop the reserve for tourism. By 2020 UWA cancelled the concession as the vendor had failed to deliver.

In July 2026, the Uganda Wildlife Authority translocated the first three Nubian giraffes from Murchison Falls National Park to the Ajai Game Reserve, "to restore the species' population, strengthen biodiversity and boost tourism in the protected area. The giraffes join other animals including buffaloes, zebras and southern white rhinos.

== Fauna ==
The reserve suffered significant extinctions during the instability in the 1980s, but there have been wildlife reintroduction efforts since then. Ugandan kob and Cape buffalo were both reintroduced in March 2024. Southern white rhinos were reintroduced in January 2026 as an ecological proxy for the functionally extinct northern white rhino which used to occur here. Grant's zebra were reintroduced in June 2026, and Rothschild's giraffe were brought back in July 2026 from Murchison Falls National Park. Other large mammals present here include the hippopotamus, waterbuck, bushbuck, blue duiker, oribi, sitatunga, common warthog, and bushpig. Primates here are olive baboon, black-and-white colobus, vervet monkey, patas monkey, and the red-tailed monkey. Among predators, leopards and spotted hyenas have both been spotted here, but they are uncommon.

== Getting there ==
To get to Ajai from Arua, follow the surfaced Packwach Road south for 15 kilometers to Olevu, then branch left on to a 40 kilometer dirt road running east to the reserve.
