= Ajay Dalai =

Indian Canadian chemical engineer (born 1959)

- Born: April 13, 1959 (age 67); Orissa, India
- Spouse: Debasmita
- Awards: Miroslaw Romanowski Medal

Academic background
- Education: BSc, 1979, Utkal University; BSc, Chemical Engineering, 1982, Nagpur University; M.Tech, 1984, Indian Institute of Technology; PhD, 1990, University of Saskatchewan
- Thesis: Fischer-Tropsch synthesis in a tube-wall reactor using cobalt, iron and cobalt-iron bimetallic catalysts : experimental and modelling studies. (1990)

Ajay Kumar Dalai (born April 13, 1959) is an Indian-Canadian chemical engineer. He is a professor and Canada Research Chair of Bioenergy and Environmentally Friendly Chemical Processing at the University of Saskatchewan.

== Early life and education ==
Dalai was born on April 13, 1959, in Orissa, India. He completed his Bachelor of Science and Bachelor of Technology degree from Laxminarayan Institute of Technology before earning his Master of Technology at the Indian Institute of Technology. Following this, Dalai moved to North America and completed his PhD from the University of Saskatchewan (USask) in Chemical Engineering in 1990.

== Career ==
As an associate professor of chemical engineering at the University of Saskatchewan (USask). Dalai was awarded the 2000 Petro-Canada Young Innovator award to further his research into developing safer materials for gasoline production in oil refineries. While conducting this research, he was asked to develop a Canada Research Chair (CRC) application focused on bioenergy renewable energy generated from organic matter. His application was accepted in 2001 and he became one of USask's CRC of Bioenergy and Environmentally Friendly Chemical Processing. A few years later, he received funding through a joint venture between the BIOCAP Canada Foundation and the Natural Sciences and Engineering Research Council (NSERC) to create a biodegradable lubricating additive for diesel engines.

As a chemical engineering professor and Canada Research Chair, Dalai was awarded $525,000 to develop a method to produce biodiesel from low-cost raw materials. He was also granted a Fulbright Scholarship Award to conduct research at the University of California, Davis to develop an integrated process for the complete conversion of biomass to alcohols, phenols and methane using supercritical technology. As a result of his research, Dalai was elected a Fellow of the Engineering Institute of Canada in 2011. A few years later, he was elected a Fellow of the Royal Society of Canada (RSC).

In January 2020, Dalai was granted the title of Distinguished Professor by the University of Saskatchewan (USask), recognizing that his research has significantly enhanced his field of knowledge. Following this, he was awarded the Royal Society of Canada’s (RSC) Miroslaw Romanowski Medal for outstanding contributions to environmental science. Dalai also became the 2021 winner of the J.W. George Ivany Award for Internationalization at the People Around the World Conference.

== Personal life ==
Dalai and his wife Debasmita have children together.
