= Norwich City F.C. Under-21s and Academy =

Youth organisation run by Norwich City F.C

Coordinates: 52°36′50″N 1°12′29″E

Norwich City Under-21s
- Full name: Norwich City Football Club Under-21s
- Nicknames: The Canaries; The Yellows
- Ground: Avant Training Centre
- Capacity: 1,000
- Manager: Olly Lee (Under-21s)
- League: Premier League 2 23rd of 29
Home colours	Away colours

Norwich City Under-21s and Academy is the youth organisation run by Norwich City F.C. The team is made up of under-21 and academy players and is effectively Norwich City's second-string side. The under-18 players among other younger age groups make up the academy team. In March 2018, Norwich City F.C. announced a public mini-bond investment scheme, through sports investment platform Tifosy, with the aim of raising £3,500,000 towards developing new academy facilities. Funds from more than 700 fans and investors exceeded the £3,500,000 target and reached the £5,000,000 limit through a five-year bond scheme, called the Canaries bond, and sold out before it could be made publicly available. With the money, the club has installed new pitches at its Category 1 Academy, as well as a new irrigation system, cameras for analysis and floodlights. LSI Architects designed the main academy building which opened in 2019. It features a player lounge, a match analysis suite, classrooms and changing rooms. Academy players also have access to the Soccerbot360. Opened in 2021 and the first of its kind in England, the system is designed to help players improve their touch and passing skills using a 360 projector screen and computer software.

Norwich City F.C. under-18s won the FA Youth Cup in 2012‍–‍13 after beating Chelsea 4‍–‍2 on aggregate. Neil Adams was the under-18s manager at the time. Also in the 2012‍–‍13 season, Norwich City F.C. under 21s won the Norfolk Senior Cup after defeating Wroxham 2‍–‍0. The under-21s won the Norfolk Senior Cup again in 2024‍–‍25 after beating Wroxham 4‍–‍1.

== Under-21 squad ==
Players listed in the U21 squad on Norwich City's official website. Displayed squad numbers are first team numbers issued at varying points during the season.

As of 28 August 2026

Note: Flags indicate national team as defined under FIFA eligibility rules; some limited exceptions apply. Players may hold more than one non-FIFA nationality.

No.	Pos.	Nation	Player
40	GK	ENG	Caleb Ansen
43	DF	TUR	Vatan Özcan
46	FW	ENG	Errol Mundle-Smith
—	GK	WAL	Luis Lines
—	GK	ENG	Rylee Mitchell
—	DF	ENG	Tyler Williams
—	DF	ENG	Takudzwa Gwanzura
—	DF	ENG	Zach Sclare
—	DF	ENG	Finlay Oligbo
—	DF	ENG	Oser Okpiabhele
—	DF	IRL	Vinnie Leonard
—	DF	ENG	Jake Glossop
—	MF	ENG	Luke Towler
—	MF	SCO	Alan Domeracki

No.	Pos.	Nation	Player
—	MF	ENG	Toby Chilvers
—	MF	ENG	Miles Bracking
—	MF	UKR	Zach Baumann
—	MF	ENG	Uriah Djedje
—	MF	NIR	Glenn McCourt
—	MF	SCO	Reuben Cooper
—	MF	ENG	Sonny Rowland
—	MF	ENG	Rio Mundle
—	MF	IRL	Luke Chukwu
—	FW	IRQ	Botan Ameen
—	FW	ENG	Ken Aboh
—	FW	ENG	Finlay Corke
—	FW	ENG	Kahlil Steele

=== Out on loan ===
Note: Flags indicate national team as defined under FIFA eligibility rules; some limited exceptions apply. Players may hold more than one non-FIFA nationality.

No.	Pos.	Nation	Player
—	FW	ENG	Dylan Jones (at Tranmere Rovers until 30 June 2027)

== Under-18 squad ==
Norwich City Under-18s
- Full name: Norwich City Football Club Under-18s
- Nicknames: The Canaries; Yellows
- Ground: Avant Training Centre
- Capacity: 1,000
- Coach: Greg Crane (Under-18s)
- League: U18 Premier League South 12th of 15
Home colours	Away colours

Players listed in the U18 squad on Norwich City's official website.

As of 25 July 2026

Note: Flags indicate national team as defined under FIFA eligibility rules; some limited exceptions apply. Players may hold more than one non-FIFA nationality.

No.	Pos.	Nation	Player
—	GK	ENG	Nikodem Tkaczuk
—	GK	ENG	Lucas Alvarado
—	GK	ENG	Harry Darbyshire-Came
—	DF	ENG	Jayden Munikwa
—	DF	WAL	Ollie Oldfield
—	DF	ENG	Samuel Augusto
—	DF	ENG	Bobby Crane
—	DF	ENG	Rupert Askham
—	DF	ENG	Ademidire Akarakiri
—	FW	ENG	Aaron Goodson

No.	Pos.	Nation	Player
—	MF	ENG	Jeremiah Sinclair-Brown
—	MF	ENG	Hugo Collins
—	MF	ENG	Reece Wilkes
—	MF	ENG	Jack Duffy
—	MF	ENG	Ollie Roberson
—	FW	ENG	Henry Edwards
—	FW	ENG	Joseph Kipa
—	FW	ENG	Rio Smith-Roach
—	FW	ENG	Ben Tree

=== Out on loan ===
Note: Flags indicate national team as defined under FIFA eligibility rules; some limited exceptions apply. Players may hold more than one non-FIFA nationality.

No.	Pos.	Nation	Player

== Honours ==
- FA Youth Cup
  - Winners (2): 1982-83, 2012-13
- Norfolk Senior Cup
  - Winners 2012‍–‍13, 2024‍–‍25

== Academy graduates ==
Notable players who have progressed through the Norwich City academy.

- Max Aarons
- Tom Adeyemi
- Ade Akinbiyi
- Craig Bellamy
- Todd Cantwell
- Jamie Cureton
- Darren Eadie
- Adrian Forbes
- Robert Green
- Angus Gunn
- Brad Hills
- Adam Idah
- Andy Johnson
- Abu Kamara
- Darren Kenton
- Jamal Lewis
- Joe Lewis
- Chris Llewellyn
- Cameron McGeehan
- Andy Marshall
- Chris Martin
- Alex Matos
- Remi Matthews
- Glenn Middleton
- Danny Mills
- Carlton Morris
- Jacob Murphy
- Josh Murphy
- Andrew Omobamidele
- Jonathan Rowe
- Declan Rudd
- Darel Russell
- Jason Shackell
- Korey Smith
- Jed Steer
- Chris Sutton
- Harry Toffolo

== See also ==
- 2016–17 Premier League International Cup
- 2016–17 EFL Trophy
- 2016–17 Premier League Cup
