= Ajai K. Singh =

Indian chemist (born 1953)

Ajai Kumar Singh
- Born: 1953 (age 72–73); New Delhi, India
- Education: University of Delhi
- Scientific career
- Fields: Chemistry, Inorganic chemistry, catalysis, and Nanomaterials
- Workplaces: Indian Institute of Technology Delhi

Ajai Kumar Singh FRSC (born in 1953) is an Indian chemist and Emeritus Professor of Chemistry at IIT Delhi. Singh is known for his contribution to the development of new organochalcogen ligand family and their metal complexes for promoting carbon-carbon coupling and related transformations. Singh is an honorary member of Science Faculty of the University of Delhi.

== Early life and education ==
Ajai was born in New Delhi, India. He completed his master's degree in Inorganic Chemistry at University of Delhi. In 1977 Singh was promoted to Ph.D. at University of Delhi. His thesis advisor was RP Singh.

== Career ==
Singh was a postdoctoral fellow at Aston University with W. R. McWhinnie. In 1982, he joined IIT faculty as an assistant professor of chemistry. He was promoted to associate professor in 1995 and to Professor in 2000. He has coauthored over 200 accepted academic publications. He is known for his involvement in the development of organochalcogen ligand family and their metal complexes for promoting C-C coupling reactions and related transformations. As of 2015, he served as an editorial member for the academic journal, RSC Advances.

== Notable awards ==
- Fellow Royal Society of Chemistry
- Honorary Member; Science Faculty, University of Delhi, 2003 onwards
- Adjunct Professor Doon University, Dehradun, India, 2016-2018
- Member of American Chemical Society, 2015-2018
- Guest Editor, Journal of Chemical Sciences (Springer), 2006, Vol. 118, Issue 6
- Convener, Developing Talent in the Chemical Sciences Initiative, Royal Society of Chemistry, U K, 26 September 2011
- President, Inorg. Section, Indian Council of Chemist, Convention, Dec 2011
