= Ajay Poddar =

Indian-American engineer

Ajay Poddar is an Indian-Americans electrical engineer at Synergy Microwave Corporation in Paterson, New Jersey. He was named a Fellow of the Institute of Electrical and Electronics Engineers (IEEE) in 2016 for his work with microwave oscillators.

== Biography ==
Poddar originally received his Bachelor of Technology Degree in Electronics and Communication Engineering from the National Institute of Technology Calicut in 1990. Starting in 1991, Poddar worked at the Defence Research and Development Organisation of India, a branch of the Indian government that supports the furtherance of science throughout a network of fifty-two laboratories across the country. At DRDO, he was able to design a large number of scientific projects, including both Ka-Band and X-band RADAR. Following his leave of DRDO in 2001, he has worked at Synergy Microwave Corporation. According to IEEE's Microwave Theory and Technology Division, his research is currently focused on "...mobius metamaterial-inspired energy efficient electronic circuits." As of January 2018, Poddar has published over two hundred and sixty research papers.
