= Ajai Pal Singh =

Indian politician

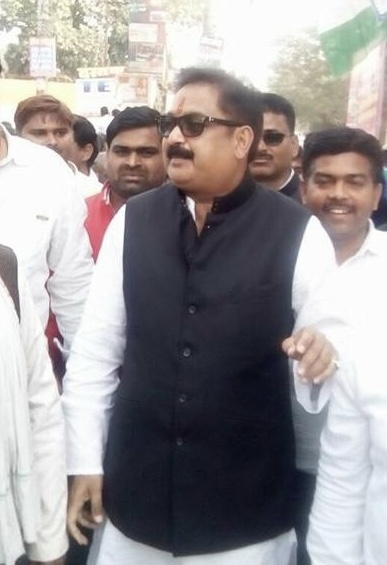

Member of Legislative Assembly
- In office 2007–2012
- Constituency: Dalmau (Now Unchahar)

Personal details
- Born: 20 March 1969 (age 57) Allahabad, Uttar Pradesh, India
- Party: Indian National Congress
- As of 25 March, 2007

Ajai Pal Singh (born 20 March 1969) is an Indian politician and former Member in the Uttar Pradesh Legislative Assembly. He was a MLA from Dalmau Vidhan Sabha Seat from 2007 until 2012.
