= Ajay Dubé =

Canadian field hockey player

Medal record

Men's field hockey

Representing Canada

Pan American Games
Gold medal – first place	1987 Indianapolis	Team

Ajay Dubé (born 10 October 1960 in Paris) is a Canadian former field hockey player who competed in the 1988 Summer Olympics.

He was inducted into the Lisgar Collegiate Institute Athletic Wall of Fame in 2018.
