= Ajay Tavares =

English youth footballer

Personal information
- Full name: Ajay Lopes Tavares
- Date of birth: 28 December 2009 (age 16)
- Place of birth: England
- Positions: Forward; winger

Team information
- Current team: Barcelona

Youth career
- 2022–2026: Norwich City
- 2026–: Barcelona

International career^{‡}
Years	Team	Apps	(Gls)
2024	England U15	4	(2)
2024	England U16	7	(1)
2025–	England U17	7	(0)
- ‡ National team caps and goals as of 12:03, 16 April 2026 (UTC)

Ajay Lopes Tavares (born 28 December 2009) is an English youth footballer who plays as a forward or winger for the Barcelona youth academy. He has represented England at under-17s level.

== Early life ==
Tavares was born on 28 December 2009, in Aylsham, Norfolk, England, and is eligible to represent both England and Portugal through his dual nationality.

== Club career ==
=== Norwich City ===
Tavares came through the Norwich City academy and progressed through the club's youth ranks.

=== Barcelona ===
In 2025, Tavares was linked with a move to Barcelona as he approached eligibility for an international move. He signed for their youth team in February 2026.

== International career ==
Tavares has represented England at the youth international levels, and has multiple caps for the England under-17 side.
