= Ajay Desai =

Indian wildlife conservationist (1957–2020)

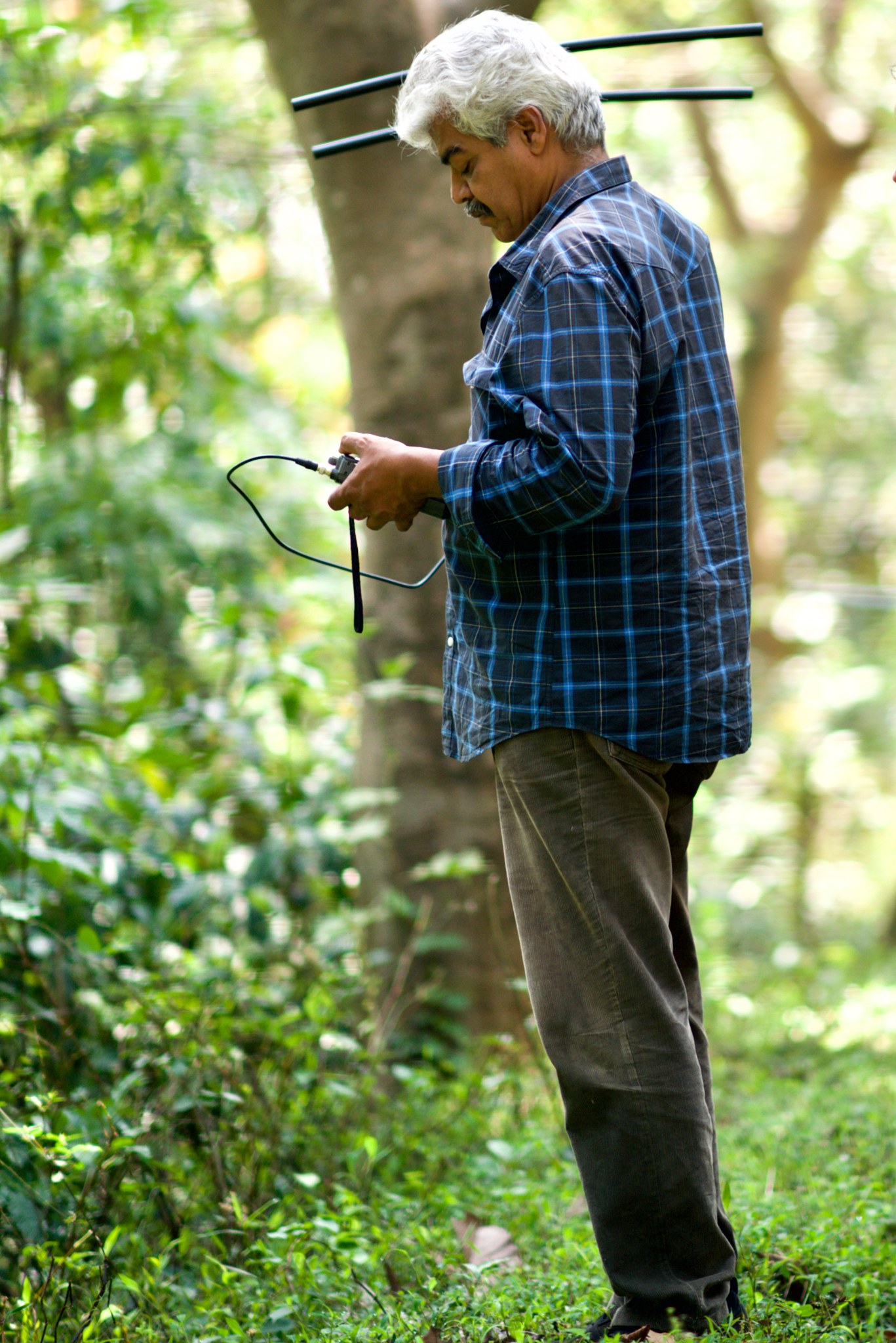
- Desai in Aluru, Hassan District, India, 2014
- Born: 24 July 1957
- Died: 20 November 2020 (aged 63); Belgaum, Karnataka, India
- Other name: Elephant Man
- Education: Karnatak University
- Occupations: Wildlife conservationist and researcher
- Known for: Studying wild elephant behavior; wildlife and human conflict

Ajay Adrushyappa Desai, also known as Elephant Man, (24 July 1957 – 20 November 2020) was an Indian Field Biologist-conservationist and researcher specializing in behavior of wild elephants with a focus on wildlife conflicts with human settlement.

== Early life ==
Desai's family was from Konnur, Bagalkot district, in Karnataka, and had settled in Belgaum. He completed his schooling in Belgaum and went on to complete his post graduate studies in Marine biology from Karnatak University.

== Career ==
Desai started his career with the Bombay Natural History Society from 1982 as a researcher and went on to spend many years focusing on studying elephant herding and track formation across the Indian reserves of Mudumalai and Sri Lanka. He was a wildlife conservationist and expert on Asiatic elephant behavior focusing on studying wildlife conflicts with human settlements.

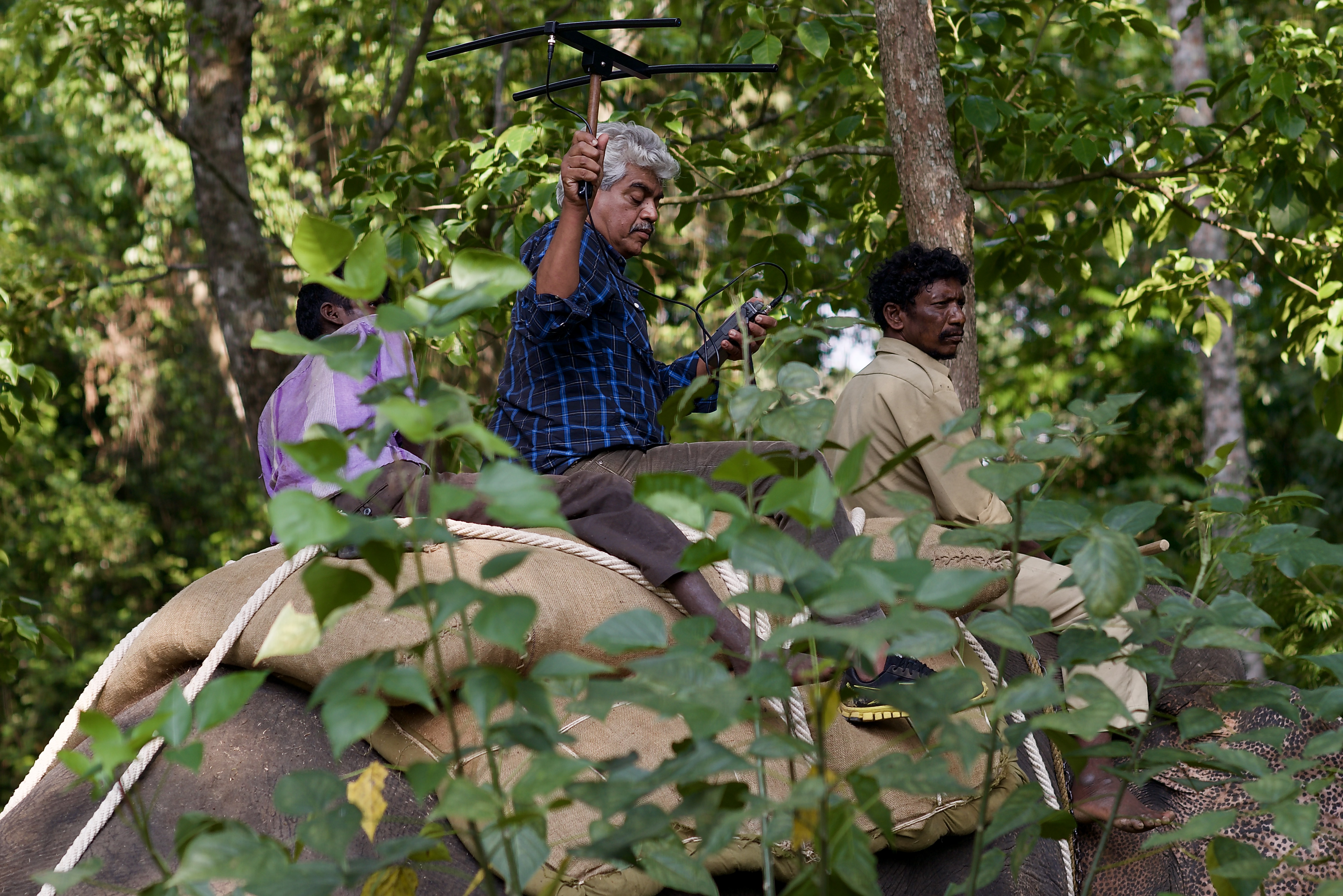
Desai, radio-tracking an elephant in Hassan district, Karnataka, 2014.

His study built on radio tagging of elephants to track movements and was focused on wild elephant digression into human settlements including agricultural lands and the resulting damages. He argued through his reports that human actions including deforestation close to wildlife settlements was the cause for elephant movements into adjoining villages. He was an advocate for creation of dedicated animal movement corridors as means to conserve nature and wildlife.

He was appointed by the Supreme Court of India as a part of a committee to study the Sigur elephant corridor in Tamil Nadu. He had completed the inspection between 7 and 9 November 2020, a few days prior to his death. The Supreme Court of India and the Chief Justice of India had also recommended his name for a committee to study the impacts of coal mining on the ecosystem near mining sites, in a court challenge by the Jharkhand state government against the central government's auction of coal blocks in the state, in 2020.

He had earlier been a part of the Srisailam Tiger Reserve Committee in 2009, and also a member of the Nagarhole Tiger Reserve Committee focusing on relocation of wildlife between Nagarhole in Karnataka, and Mudumalai in Tamil Nadu. His focus was on studying animal behavior with an emphasis on studying wildlife conflict with human settlements.

He was a member and co-chair of the Asian Elephant Specialist group at the International Union for Conservation of Nature (IUCN) between 2005 and 2015, a member of the Karnataka High Court constituted elephant task force. He was also a member of the Indian Ministry of Environment, Forest and Climate Change's task force building out the National Elephant Action Plan, detailing actions that the ministry could take to mitigate conflicts between wild elephants and humans.

He was also an advisor to the World Wide Fund for Nature in India, Wildlife Institute of India, and also the Deutsche Gesellschaft für Internationale Zusammenarbeit's biodiversity programs to mitigate elephant conflicts in the Indian states of Karnataka, West Bengal, and Uttarakhand.

== Personal life ==
Desai was married and had two children. He died on 20 November 2020, of cardiac arrest, at his home in Belgaum, in Karnataka. He was 63.

== Publications ==
- Desai, Ajay (1997). The Indian Elephant: Endangered in the Land of Lord Ganesha. Vigyan Prasar & Sanctuary Magazine, Mumbai. ISBN 978-81-7480-024-4.
- Desai, Ajay; Rangarajan, Mahesh; Sukumar, R.; Easa, P. S.; Menon, Vivek; Vincent, S.; Ganguly, Suparna; Talukdar, B. K.; Singh, Brijendra (2010). Gajah. Securing the Future for Elephants in India. New Delhi: Ludwig-Maximilians-Universität München.
- Desai, Ajay; Riddle, H. S. (June 2015). "Human-Elephant Conflict in Asia" (PDF). U.S. Fish and Wildlife Service. S2CID 5982092. Archived from the original (PDF) on 22 November 2015.
