= Ajay Vidyasagar =

TV Executive

- Born: 1968 (age 57–58); India
- Occupations: Regional Director, APAC
- Employer: Google Inc.
- Known for: Management of Media and Entertainment

Ajay Vidyasagar (born 1969 in India) is an executive in the TV and online video industry. He studied Economics in the University of Madras and obtained two post-graduate certificates from the Indian School of Business

== Career ==
Ajay started as an account manager at Oglivy & Advertising. He progressed quickly to become the President of Star India Pte Ltd and was awarded STAR Employee of the year in 1997, and STAR Achiever of the year in 2002. He then became the chief operating officer of Sun Network in 2009, one of the most profitable broadcaster in Asia. Under his leadership, Sun TV launched successful shows such as Robot, starring Aishwarya Rai Bachchan opposite Rajinikanth. Sun Network also joined Network18 Group to form a new distribution company Sun 18 Media Services which today distributes 32 channels in India.

After quitting Sun TV he joined Google as regional head based out of Singapore since 2011. He is now the Senior managing director of YouTube APAC and leads its New Product & Solutions function for YouTube and the Google Video Network in the Asia Pacific.

== Awards ==
- Employee of the year at STAR India-1997
- STAR Achiever of the year – 2002 (including a citation from Rupert Murdoch, the chairman of Newscorp)
- Winner of the " Entrepreneur of the year" for corporate innovation and creativity in the India brand summit in 2006
- Media Marketer of the Year in 2006 for the record breaking launch of India’s most successful TV show Kaun Banaega Crorepati 2, Indian version of" Who wants to be a Millionaire"

== Presentations and interviews ==
- 2007: Seven things that shaped the Indian Television Industry, at event by Associated Chambers of Commerce and Industry of India
- 2008: India Conference at Harvard Business School
- 2013: Move People to Choose your Brand with Youtube, keynote address at Think with Google in Seoul
- 2016: How video consumption in India changed; YouTube honcho explains
- 2017: YouTube’s Ajay Vidyasagar on the change from an attention plentiful to an attention scarce era
- 2017: FICCI Frames India: Google’s Ajay Vidyasagar decodes online video revolution in India
- 2018: Malayali head of YouTube stands out with fresh ideas Our Correspondent NOVEMBER 16, 2018 04:13 PM IS...
- 2018: Rural women powering internet revolution: YouTube's Ajay Vidyasagar...
- 2018: When YouTube made Jackie Chan and Mohanlal to tango ...
