= INS Ajay =

INS Ajay may refer to the following vessels of the Indian Navy:

- INS Ajay (1960), an Ajay-class patrol vessel launched in 1960 and given to Bangladesh in 1974 where she served as BNS Surma
- INS Ajay (1990), an Abhay-class corvette commissioned in 1990
- INS Ajay (2025), an Arnala-class corvette launched in 2025
