= Ajay Varma (Bengal cricketer) =

Indian cricketer (1963–2026)

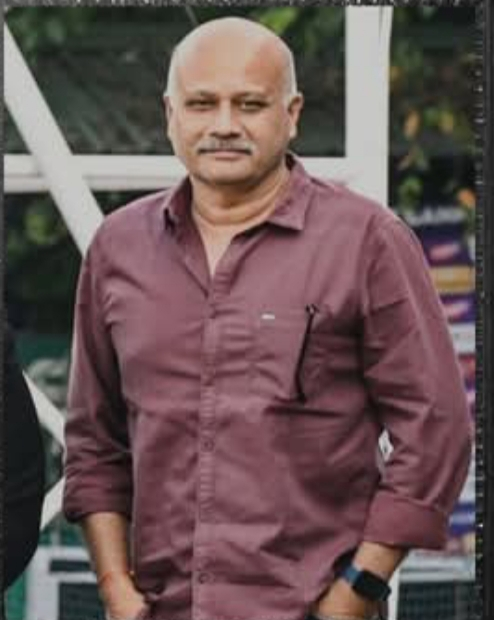

Personal information
- Born: 26 December 1963; Trivandrum, Kerala, India
- Died: 15 January 2026 (aged 62)
- Batting: Right-handed
- Bowling: Right-arm off break

Career statistics
Competition	First-class	List A
Matches	25	11
Runs scored	1,263	343
Batting average	36.08	38.11
100s/50s	3/6	0/3
Top score	162	82*
Balls bowled	2,601	438
Wickets	46	7
Bowling average	23.58	38.28
5 wickets in innings	1	0
10 wickets in match	0	0
Best bowling	6/56	2/26
Catches/stumpings	7/–	5/–
- Source: CricketArchive, 30 December 2021

Ajay Varma (26 December 1963 – 15 January 2026) was an Indian cricketer. An all-rounder, he had healthy batting and bowling averages throughout his 12-year career for Bengal. Varma died on 15 January 2026, at the age of 62.

== Sources ==
- Ajay Varma at Cricinfo
