= 2026–27 Norwich City F.C. season =

English football club season

Norwich City
2026–27 season
- Owner: Norfolk FB Holdings LLC
- Majority shareholder: Mark Attanasio
- Head Coach: Philippe Clement
- Stadium: Carrow Road
- Championship: 12th
- FA Cup: Third round
- EFL Cup: Third round
- Top goalscorer: League: Mohamed Touré; Mathias Kvistgaarden (5 each); All: Mohamed Touré; Mathias Kvistgaarden (6 each)
- Highest home attendance: 26,374 vs West Brom (Championship, 15 August 2026)
- Lowest home attendance: 20,066 vs MK Dons (EFL Cup, 8 August 2026)
- Biggest win: 5–0 vs Bristol City (A) (Championship, 7 November 2026)
- Biggest defeat: 0–5 vs Manchester City (A) (EFL Cup, 17 September 2026)
Home colours	Away colours	Third colours

The 2026–27 season is the 125th season in the history of Norwich City, and their fifth consecutive season in the Championship. In addition to the domestic league, the club will also compete in the season's editions of the FA Cup and the EFL Cup.

== Transfers and contracts ==
=== In ===
Date	Pos.	Player	From	Fee	Ref.
19 June 2026	CDM	(England) Sam Field	(England) Queens Park Rangers	Undisclosed	
25 June 2026	LW	(Jamaica) Andre Brooks	(England) Sheffield United	Undisclosed	
1 July 2026 (Note: The transfer was announced on 16 February, and would become official on July 1)	CB	(Republic of Ireland) Vinnie Leonard	(Republic of Ireland) Dundalk	€650,000 (Note: Includes add-ons and sell-on clause)	
4 August 2026	LB	(Cameroon) Darlin Yongwa	(France) Lorient	Free Transfer	

=== Out ===
Date	Pos.	Player	To	Fee	Ref.
15 June 2026 (Note: The transfer was announced on 8 June, and would become official on June 15 once the transfer window opened.)	GK	(England) George Long	(England) Southampton	Free transfer	
22 July 2026	CF	(England) La'Sean Sealey	(Austria) SW Bregenz	Free transfer	

=== Loaned in ===
Date	Pos.	Player	From	Date until	Ref.
18 June 2026	CB	(Brazil) Bruno Alves	(Brazil) Cruzeiro	End of Season (Note: Option to make the deal permanent.)	
19 August 2026	LW	(Netherlands) Anthony Musaba	(Turkey) Fenerbahçe	End of Season	

=== Loaned out ===
Date	Pos.	Player	To	Loaned until	Ref.
30 June 2026	GK	(England) Louie Moulden	(England) Accrington Stanley	End of Season	
6 August 2026	CF	(England) Ken Aboh	(England) Boston United	2 January 2027	
8 August 2026	GK	(England) Rylee Mitchell	(England) Braintree Town		
14 August 2026	RW	(Czech Republic) Matěj Jurásek	(Czech Republic) Sparta Prague	End of Season (Note: Option to make the move permanent)	
21 August 2026	CDM	(England) Uriah Djedje	(England) Hampton & Richmond Borough	19 September 2026	
28 August 2026	CM	(England) Miles Bracking	(England) Hornchurch	9 January 2027 (Note: On 10 October, Bracking's initial one-month loan at Hornchurch was extended until January.)	
28 August 2026	CF	(England) Dylan Jones	(England) Tranmere Rovers	End of Season	
1 September 2026	CB	(Croatia) Jakov Medić	(Netherlands) FC Utrecht	End of Season	
1 September 2026	CM	(England) Liam Gibbs	(England) Preston North End	End of Season	
3 September 2026	CM	(Ghana) Amankwah Forson	(Israel) Hapoel Be'er Sheva	End of Season	
6 September 2026	CB	(England) Oser Okpiabhele	(England) Fakenham Town	3 October 2026	
6 October 2026	GK	(Chile) Vicente Reyes	(England) Woking	6 January 2026	
9 October 2026	CB	(England) Zach Sclare	(England) Fakenham Town	9 November 2026	
30 October 2026	CB	(England) Theo Adelusi	(England) Hornchurch		
13 November 2026	CM	(England) Toby Chilvers	(England) Leiston	13 December 2026	

=== Released / Out of Contract ===
Date	Pos.	Player	Subsequent club	Joined date	Ref.
30 June 2026	CB	(England) Billy Gee	(Serbia) Železničar Pančevo	1 July 2026	
30 June 2026	RW	(Republic of Ireland) Tony Springett	(England) Leyton Orient	1 July 2026	
30 June 2026	CM	(England) AJ Bridge	(Scotland) Airdrieonians	8 July 2026	
30 June 2026	CB	(England) Victor Madu	(England) Coventry City	23 July 2026	
30 June 2026	GK	(Wales) Jack Ruddy	(England) Coventry City	23 July 2026	
30 June 2026	CM	(England) Foden Northover	(England) Biggleswade	1 August 2026	
30 June 2026	GK	(Wales) Daniel Barden	(England) Stevenage	5 August 2026	
30 June 2026	LW	(Scotland) Brandon Forbes	(Scotland) Alloa Athletic	11 August 2026	
30 June 2026	CAM	(Denmark) Emiliano Marcondes	(Australia) Melbourne City	20 August 2026	
30 June 2026	RB	(Germany) Harmony Okwumo	(England) Cray Wanderers	24 August 2026	
30 June 2026	CB	(England) Lloyd Ofori-Manteaw	(England) Millwall	1 September 2026	
30 June 2026	CF	(England) Damari Daley	(England) Hull City	8 September 2026	
30 June 2026	GK	(England) Ethan Binnie	(England) Wroxham	18 September 2026	
30 June 2026	CB	(Republic of Ireland) Shane Duffy	(England) Derby County	29 October 2026	
30 June 2026	GK	(England) Henry Bullen			
30 June 2026	LB	(Wales) Jaiden Owen			
30 June 2026	RWB	(Ghana) Jeffrey Schlupp			
30 June 2026	CB	(England) Charlie Wilson			

=== New Contract ===
Date	Pos.	Player	Contract expiry	Ref.
19 May 2026	CB	(England) Zach Sclare	30 June 2027	
22 May 2026	GK	(England) Caleb Ansen	30 June 2027 (Note: Option of a further year)	
27 May 2026	CM	(Scotland) Kenny McLean	30 June 2028	
1 July 2026 (Note: Contract agreement was announced on 12 May, and would become official on July 1)	RB	(England) Jake Glossop	Undisclosed (Note: First professional contract)	
27 October 2026	RB	(England) Jake Glossop	Undisclosed	

== Pre-season and friendlies ==
On 3 June, Norwich announced their pre-season preparations with friendly fixtures against La Liga side Osasuna and League One side AFC Wimbledon along with behind closed doors matches versus King's Lynn Town, Colchester United and Cambridge United. On 29 June, a trip to Switzerland to face St. Gallen was confirmed. On 24 July, a behind-closed-doors friendly at Fulham was added.

Win Draw Loss Fixtures

4 July 2026 Friendly	Norwich City	2–0	King's Lynn Town	Colney
15:00 BST	Towler 45'; Jones 80'	Report		Stadium: Avant Training Centre; Attendance: 0 (BCD)

11 July 2026 Friendly	Norwich City	0–0	Colchester United	Colney
14:00 BST		Report		Stadium: Avant Training Centre; Attendance: 0 (BCD)

17 July 2026 Friendly	St. Gallen	0–3	Norwich City	St. Gallen, Switzerland
20:00 CEST		Report	Wright 15'; Maghoma 39'; McConville 45'	Stadium: Kybunpark; Attendance: 3,022

22 July 2026 Friendly	AFC Wimbledon	0–0	Norwich City	Wimbledon
19:00 BST		Report		Stadium: Cherry Red Records Stadium; Attendance: 3,110

25 July 2026 Friendly	Fulham	0–2	Norwich City	New Malden
13:00 BST		Report	Ben Slimane 19'; Darling 61'	Stadium: Motspur Park Training Ground; Attendance: 0 (BCD)

1 August 2026 Friendly	Norwich City	1–2	Osasuna	Norwich
15:00 BST	Darling 61'	Report	García 67' (pen.); Bonel 90'	Stadium: Carrow Road; Attendance: 12,462

4 August 2026 Friendly	Norwich City	0–0	Cambridge United	Colney
16:00 BST		Report		Stadium: Avant Training Centre; Attendance: 0 (BCD)

2 October 2026 Friendly	Brentford	2–2	Norwich City	Brentford
12:30 BST		Report		Stadium: Gtech Community Stadium; Attendance: 0 (BCD)

== Competitions ==
=== Overall record ===
Competition	First match	Last match	Starting round	Final position	Record							
Competition	First match	Last match	Starting round	Final position	Pld	W	D	L	GF	GA	GD	Win %
Championship	15 August 2026	1 May 2027	Matchday 1		16	8	0	8	34	25	+9	50.00
FA Cup	January 2027		Third round		0	0	0	0	0	0	+0	—
EFL Cup	8 August 2026	17 September 2026	First round	Third round	3	2	0	1	6	7	−1	66.67
Total					19	10	0	9	40	32	+8	52.63

Last updated: 7 November 2026
Source: Soccerway

=== Championship ===
==== League table ====
Pos	Team	Pld	W	D	L	GF	GA	GD	Pts
9	Sheffield United	16	7	4	5	25	19	+6	25
10	West Ham United	16	6	6	4	38	24	+14	24
11	Norwich City	16	8	0	8	34	25	+9	24
12	Portsmouth	16	6	5	5	21	19	+2	23
13	Blackburn Rovers	15	6	3	6	22	23	−1	21

Updated to match(es) played on 21 November 2026. Source: EFL Official Website
Rules for classification: 1) Points; 2) Goal difference; 3) Number of goals scored; 4) Head-to-head results; 5) Wins; 6) Away goals; 7) Penalty points (sec 9.5); 8) Number of 12-point sending off offences; 9) Play-off (only if needed to determine promotion/relegation)

==== Results summary ====
Overall								Home						Away					
Pld	W	D	L	GF	GA	GD	Pts	W	D	L	GF	GA	GD	W	D	L	GF	GA	GD
16	8	0	8	34	25	+9	24	4	0	4	15	13	+2	4	0	4	19	12	+7

Last updated: 7 November 2026.
Source: Soccerway

==== Results by round ====
Round	1	2	3	4	5	6	7	8	9	10	11	12	13	14	15	16	17	18	19	20	21	22	23	24	25	26	27	28	29	30	31	32	33	34
Ground	H	A	H	A	A	H	A	H	A	H	H	A	H	A	A	H	H	A	H	A	A	H	A	H	H	A	A	H	H	A	H	A	A	H
Result	L	L	W	L	W	W	L	L	L	L	L	W	W	W	W	W																		
Position	20	23	16	20	12	9	12	17	18	20	21	20	15	12	12	11																		
Points	0	0	3	3	6	9	9	9	9	9	9	12	15	18	21	24																		

Source: Soccerway
A = Away; H = Home; W = Win; D = Draw; L = Loss; P = Postponed

==== Matches ====
On 25 June, the Championship fixtures were revealed.

Win Draw Loss Fixtures

15 August 2026 1	Norwich City	1–2	West Bromwich Albion	Norwich
15:00 BST	Kvistgaarden 90'	Report	Phillips (yellow card) 31'; Diakité (yellow card) 48'; Heggebø 75'; Morgan 87'	Stadium: Carrow Road; Attendance: 26,374; Referee: Tim Robinson

22 August 2026 2	Millwall	3–0	Norwich City	Bermondsey
12:30 BST	Arconte 18', 58'; Metcalfe (yellow card) 40'; Cundle 84'	Report	Córdoba (yellow card) 25' (yellow-red card) 64'; Darling (yellow card) 37'	Stadium: The Den; Attendance: 19,564; Referee: Sam Allison
Note: Fixture was initially scheduled for a 15:00 kick-off, but was brought forward for live Sky Sports.

29 August 2026 3	Norwich City	4–1	Burnley	Norwich
15:00 BST	Touré 2', 21'; Brooks 5', 67', (yellow card) 63'; McConville (yellow card) 16'; Córdoba (yellow card) 29'; Ben Slimane (yellow card) 65'	Report	Laurent 27', (yellow card) 28' (yellow-red card) 77'; Flemming (yellow card) 71'	Stadium: Carrow Road; Attendance: 25,498; Referee: Elliot Bell

1 September 2026 4	Stoke City	1–0	Norwich City	Stoke-on-Trent
20:00 BST	Galbraith 13', (yellow card) 49'; Lawal (yellow card) 47'	Report	Córdoba (yellow card) 61'; McLean (yellow card) 66'	Stadium: bet365 Stadium; Attendance: 20,140; Referee: Andrew Kitchen
Note: Fixture was initially scheduled for a 19:45 kick-off, but was pushed back for live Sky Sports.

5 September 2026 5	Sheffield United	1–3	Norwich City	Sheffield
15:00 BST	Bamford 23'; Kitching (yellow card) 45+1'; Norrington-Davies (yellow card) 55'	Report	Musaba 8'; McConville (yellow card) 38'; Fisher (yellow card) 38'; Touré 44', (yellow card) 44'; Kvistgaarden 62'	Stadium: Bramall Lane; Attendance: 26,519; Referee: Josh Smith

9 September 2026 6	Norwich City	2–1	Birmingham City	Norwich
19:45 BST	Chrisene (yellow card) 13'; Córdoba (yellow card) 25'; Schwartau 28', (yellow card) 60'; Diallo 39'; Stacey (yellow card) 59'; Makama (yellow card) 83'; Crnac (yellow card) 90+4'	Report	Vicente (yellow card) 60', (goal) 64'; Neumann (yellow card) 83'	Stadium: Carrow Road; Attendance: 25,548; Referee: Tom Reeves

12 September 2026 7	Middlesbrough	4–3	Norwich City	Middlesbrough
15:00 BST	Berhalter 4', 36'; Cozier-Duberry 7'; McGree (yellow card) 53'; Phillips (yellow card) 89', (goal) 90+1'	Report	Touré 1'; Makama 70'; Wright 75'; Stacey (yellow card) 90'	Stadium: Riverside Stadium; Attendance: 29,697; Referee: Adam Herczeg

20 September 2026 8	Norwich City	3–4	Bolton Wanderers	Norwich
13:30 BST	Touré 5'; McConville 19'; Stacey 61'	Report	Gale 8'; Larrazabal 42'; Dalby 47'; Itō 72'	Stadium: Carrow Road; Attendance: 25,732; Referee: Tom Nield
Note: Fixture was initially scheduled for a 15:00 kick-off on 19 September but was moved back 24 hours due to Norwich's EFL Cup match at Manchester City on 17 September.

10 October 2026 9	Swansea City	2–1	Norwich City	Landore
12:30 BST	Fulton (yellow card) 22'; Yeo 49'; Idah 59'	Report	Wright 28'; Mattsson (yellow card) 58'	Stadium: Swansea.com Stadium; Attendance: 17,677; Referee: Andrew Kitchen
Note: Fixture was initially scheduled for a 15:00 kick-off, but was brought forward for live Sky Sports broadcasting.

14 October 2026 10	Norwich City	0–1	Southampton	Norwich
19:45 BST	Wright (yellow card) 48'; Field (yellow card) 77'	Report	Manning (yellow card) 15'; Abbott (yellow card) 26'; Matsuki 54'	Stadium: Carrow Road; Attendance: 25,633; Referee: Steve Martin

17 October 2026 11	Norwich City	0–1	Portsmouth	Norwich
15:00 BST	Schwartau (yellow card) 66'; Kvistgaarden (yellow card) 90'; Yongwa (yellow card) 90+3'	Report	Milovanović 51' (pen.), (yellow card) 55'; Kavuma-McQueen (yellow card) 64'	Stadium: Carrow Road; Attendance: 25,790; Referee: Gavin Ward

24 October 2026 12	Charlton Athletic	1–3	Norwich City	Charlton
12:30 BST	Kelman 10'; Grant (yellow card) 27'; Edwards (yellow card) 32'; Knibbs (yellow card) 69'; Mwamba (yellow card) 88'	Report	Kvistgaarden (yellow card) 29', (goal) 50'; Maghoma 35'; Mesík 76' (o.g.); Crnac (yellow card) 78'	Stadium: The Valley; Attendance: 19,588; Referee: John Busby
Note: Fixture was initially scheduled for a 15:00 kick-off, but was brought forward for live Sky Sports broadcasting.

31 October 2026 13	Norwich City	3–2	Watford	Norwich
12:30 GMT	Chrisene 53'; Musaba 62'; Córdoba (yellow card) 63'; Maghoma 71'	Report	Boadu 10', 27'; Pollock (yellow card) 41'	Stadium: Carrow Road; Attendance: 25,811; Referee: Ben Speedie
Note: Fixture was initially scheduled for a 15:00 kick-off, but was brought forward for live Sky Sports broadcasting.

3 November 2026 14	Derby County	0–4	Norwich City	Derby
19:45 GMT	Nyambe (yellow card) 38'	Report	Musaba 8'; Maghoma 27'; Yongwa 44'; Makama 66'	Stadium: Pride Park Stadium; Attendance: 25,637; Referee: Sam Allison

7 November 2026 15	Bristol City	0–5	Norwich City	Ashton Gate
12:30 GMT		Report	Maghoma 22'; Darling 53'; Brooks 56'; Makama 70'; Kvistgaarden 80' (pen.)	Stadium: Ashton Gate Stadium; Attendance: 20,758; Referee: Lewis Smith
Note: Fixture was initially scheduled for a 15:00 kick-off, but was brought forward for live Sky Sports broadcasting.

21 November 2026 16	Norwich City	2–1	Cardiff City	Norwich
12:30 GMT	McLean (yellow card) 47'; Maghoma 62'; Kvistgaarden (penalty missed) 68', 68'	Report	Salech 48'; Bielik (yellow card) 90+6'	Stadium: Carrow Road; Attendance: 25,433; Referee: Matt Donohue
Note: Fixture was initially scheduled for a 15:00 kick-off, but was brought forward for live Sky Sports broadcasting.

24 November 2026 17	Norwich City	v	Queens Park Rangers	Norwich
19:45 GMT				Stadium: Carrow Road

28 November 2026 18	Preston North End	v	Norwich City	Preston
12:30 GMT				Stadium: Deepdale

5 December 2026 19	Norwich City	v	Wrexham	Norwich
15:00 GMT				Stadium: Carrow Road

8 December 2026 20	Blackburn Rovers	v	Norwich City	Blackburn
19:45 GMT				Stadium: Ewood Park

13 December 2026 21	Lincoln City	v	Norwich City	Lincoln
14:00 GMT				Stadium: Sincil Bank
Note: Fixture was initially scheduled for 12 December, but was pushed back a day.

19 December 2026 22	Norwich City	v	Wolverhampton Wanderers	Norwich
15:00 GMT				Stadium: Carrow Road

26 December 2026 23	West Ham United	v	Norwich City	Stratford
15:00 GMT				Stadium: London Stadium

29 December 2026 24	Norwich City	v	Charlton Athletic	Norwich
19:45 GMT				Stadium: Carrow Road

1 January 2027 25	Norwich City	v	Lincoln City	Norwich
15:00 GMT				Stadium: Carrow Road

16 January 2027 26	Portsmouth	v	Norwich City	Milton
15:00 GMT				Stadium: Fratton Park

23 January 2027 27	Watford	v	Norwich City	Watford
15:00 GMT				Stadium: Vicarage Road

26 January 2027 28	Norwich City	v	Derby County	Norwich
20:00 GMT				Stadium: Carrow Road
Note: Fixture was initially scheduled for a 19:45 kick-off, but was pushed back fifteen minutes for live Sky Sports broadcasting.

31 January 2027 29	Norwich City	v	Bristol City	Norwich
12:00 GMT				Stadium: Carrow Road
Note: Fixture was initially scheduled for 30 January, but was pushed back a day for live Sky Sports broadcasting.

6 February 2027 30	Cardiff City	v	Norwich City	Leckwith
15:00 GMT				Stadium: Cardiff City Stadium

13 February 2027 31	Norwich City	v	Middlesbrough	Norwich
15:00 GMT				Stadium: Carrow Road

17 February 2027 32	Southampton	v	Norwich City	Southampton
19:45 GMT				Stadium: St Mary's Stadium

20 February 2027 33	Bolton Wanderers	v	Norwich City	Horwich
15:00 GMT				Stadium: Toughsheet Community Stadium

27 February 2027 34	Norwich City	v	Swansea City	Norwich
12:30 GMT				Stadium: Carrow Road
Note: Fixture was initially scheduled for a 15:00 kick-off, but was brought forward for live Sky Sports broadcasting.

=== FA Cup ===
Win Draw Loss Fixtures

=== EFL Cup ===
Norwich were drawn at home to Milton Keynes Dons in the first round and away to Cardiff City in the second round. They were then drawn away to Manchester City in the third round.

Win Draw Loss Fixtures

8 August 2026 First round	Norwich City	4–1	Milton Keynes Dons	Norwich
15:00 BST	Touré 1'; Ben Slimane 7'; Córdoba (yellow card) 9'; Stacey (yellow card) 20'; McLean (yellow card) 34'; Chrisene 43'; Brooks 59', (yellow card) 60'	Report	Wintle 56'; Goode (yellow card) 84'	Stadium: Carrow Road; Attendance: 20,056; Referee: Elliott Swallow

25 August 2026 Second round	Cardiff City	1–2	Norwich City	Leckwith, Cardiff
19:00 BST	Ng (yellow card) 27'; Davies (yellow card) 33'; Colwill (yellow card) 84'; Salech 90+3'	Report	Kvistgaarden 25'; Mattsson (yellow card) 50'; Crnac 78'	Stadium: Cardiff City Stadium; Attendance: 5,432; Referee: Gavin Ward

17 September 2026 Third round	Manchester City	5–0	Norwich City	Manchester
19:30 BST	Samba 29', 54'; Cherki 32'; Allan 48'; McAidoo 90'	Report	Fisher (yellow card) 30'	Stadium: City of Manchester Stadium; Attendance: 32,451; Referee: Ruebyn Ricardo

== Squad statistics ==
=== Appearances and goals ===
As of match played 21 November 2026

Italics indicate loaned in player

No.	Pos	Nat	Player	Total		Championship		FA Cup		EFL Cup	
No.	Pos	Nat	Player	Apps	Goals	Apps	Goals	Apps	Goals	Apps	Goals
1	GK	(Bosnia and Herzegovina)	Vladan Kovačević	10	0	9	0	0	0	1	0
3	DF	(England)	Jack Stacey	16	1	12+2	1	0	0	2	0
6	DF	(England)	Harry Darling	11	1	6+2	1	0	0	2+1	0
7	MF	(Denmark)	Pelle Mattsson	14	0	11+1	0	0	0	2	0
11	MF	(Jamaica)	Andre Brooks	18	4	16	3	0	0	1+1	1
12	DF	(England)	Lucien Mahovo	5	0	0+5	0	0	0	0	0
13	DF	(Cameroon)	Darlin Yongwa	9	1	3+4	1	0	0	2	0
14	DF	(England)	Ben Chrisene	15	2	13+1	1	0	0	1	1
15	DF	(Northern Ireland)	Ruairi McConville	17	1	14+1	1	0	0	1+1	0
16	MF	(England)	Jacob Wright	18	2	9+6	2	0	0	2+1	0
17	FW	(Croatia)	Ante Crnac	8	1	0+6	0	0	0	1+1	1
19	MF	(Senegal)	Papa Amadou Diallo	7	1	1+5	1	0	0	1	0
20	MF	(Tunisia)	Anis Ben Slimane	13	1	7+3	0	0	0	2+1	1
21	FW	(Australia)	Mohamed Touré	9	6	7	5	0	0	1+1	1
22	MF	(Serbia)	Mirko Topić	0	0	0	0	0	0	0	0
23	MF	(Scotland)	Kenny McLean	12	0	9+2	0	0	0	1	0
24	FW	(England)	Jovon Makama	11	3	1+10	3	0	0	0	0
25	MF	(Democratic Republic of the Congo)	Paris Maghoma	12	4	6+4	4	0	0	0+2	0
26	MF	(England)	Sam Field	12	0	5+5	0	0	0	1+1	0
28	DF	(Brazil)	Bruno Alves	2	0	0	0	0	0	2	0
29	MF	(Denmark)	Oscar Schwartau	16	1	9+4	1	0	0	2+1	0
30	FW	(Denmark)	Mathias Kvistgaarden	16	5	8+5	4	0	0	2+1	1
32	GK	(England)	Daniel Grimshaw	9	0	7	0	0	0	2	0
33	DF	(Panama)	José Córdoba	14	0	12+1	0	0	0	1	0
35	DF	(England)	Kellen Fisher	8	0	4+2	0	0	0	1+1	0
37	MF	(Canada)	Ali Ahmed	0	0	0	0	0	0	0	0
40	GK	(England)	Caleb Ansen	0	0	0	0	0	0	0	0
41	MF	(Scotland)	Gabriel Forsyth	0	0	0	0	0	0	0	0
43	DF	(Turkey)	Vatan Özcan	0	0	0	0	0	0	0	0
44	MF	(Wales)	Elliot Myles	0	0	0	0	0	0	0	0
46	FW	(England)	Errol Mundle-Smith	0	0	0	0	0	0	0	0
49	MF	(Democratic Republic of the Congo)	Anthony Musaba	16	3	8+6	3	0	0	1+1	0
Player(s) who featured but departed the club on loan during the season:
8	MF	(England)	Liam Gibbs	1	0	0	0	0	0	1	0
10	MF	(Czech Republic)	Matěj Jurásek	1	0	0	0	0	0	0+1	0
Player(s) who featured but departed the club permanently during the season:

=== Goalscorers ===
As of match played 21 November 2026

Rnk	No	Pos	Nat	Name	Championship	FA Cup	EFL Cup	Total
1	21	FW	(Australia)	Mohamed Touré	5	0	1	6
1	30	FW	(Denmark)	Mathias Kvistgaarden	5	0	1	6
3	25	MF	(Democratic Republic of the Congo)	Paris Maghoma	5	0	0	5
4	11	MF	(Jamaica)	Andre Brooks	3	0	1	4
5	49	MF	(Democratic Republic of the Congo)	Anthony Musaba	3	0	0	3
5	24	FW	(England)	Jovon Makama	3	0	0	3
7	16	MF	(England)	Jacob Wright	2	0	0	2
7	14	DF	(England)	Ben Chrisene	1	0	1	2
9	29	MF	(Denmark)	Oscar Schwartau	1	0	0	1
9	19	MF	(Senegal)	Papa Amadou Diallo	1	0	0	1
9	15	DF	(Northern Ireland)	Ruairi McConville	1	0	0	1
9	3	DF	(England)	Jack Stacey	1	0	0	1
9	13	DF	(Cameroon)	Darlin Yongwa	1	0	0	1
9	6	DF	(England)	Harry Darling	1	0	0	1
9	20	MF	(Tunisia)	Anis Ben Slimane	0	0	1	1
9	17	FW	(Croatia)	Ante Crnac	0	0	1	1
Own goals					1	0	0	1
Total					34	0	6	40

=== Disciplinary record ===
As of match played 21 November 2026

Rank	No.	Pos.	Nat.	Player	Championship		FA Cup		EFL Cup		Total		
Rank	No.	Pos.	Nat.	Player	Yellow card	Red card	Yellow card	Red card	Yellow card	Red card	Yellow card	Red card	
1	33	DF	(Panama)	José Córdoba	6	1	0	0	1	0	7	1	
2	3	DF	(England)	Jack Stacey	2	0	0	0	1	0	3	0	
2	23	MF	(Scotland)	Kenny McLean	2	0	0	0	1	0	3	0	
4	15	DF	(Northern Ireland)	Ruairi McConville	2	0	0	0	0	0	2	0	
4	29	MF	(Denmark)	Oscar Schwartau	2	0	0	0	0	0	2	0	
4	30	FW	(Denmark)	Mathias Kvistgaarden	2	0	0	0	0	0	2	0	
4	17	FW	(Croatia)	Ante Crnac	2	0	0	0	0	0	2	0	
4	11	MF	(Jamaica)	Andre Brooks	1	0	0	0	1	0	2	0	
4	35	DF	(England)	Kellen Fisher	1	0	0	0	1	0	2	0	
4	7	MF	(Denmark)	Pelle Mattsson	1	0	0	0	1	0	2	0	
11	6	DF	(England)	Harry Darling	1	0	0	0	0	0	1	0	
11	20	MF	(Tunisia)	Anis Ben Slimane	1	0	0	0	0	0	1	0	
11	21	FW	(Australia)	Mohamed Touré	1	0	0	0	0	0	1	0	
11	14	DF	(England)	Ben Chrisene	1	0	0	0	0	0	1	0	
11	24	FW	(England)	Jovon Makama	1	0	0	0	0	0	1	0	
11	16	MF	(England)	Jacob Wright	1	0	0	0	0	0	1	0	
11	26	MF	(England)	Sam Field	1	0	0	0	0	0	1	0	
11	13	DF	(Cameroon)	Darlin Yongwa	1	0	0	0	0	0	1	0	
11	Total					29	1	0	0	6	0	35	1
