= Daniel Barden =

Daniel Barden is the name of:

- Daniel Barden (footballer) (born 2001), Welsh footballer
- Daniel Barden (2005–2012), a seven-year-old victim of the Sandy Hook Elementary School shooting
