= Ruairi McConville =

Northern Irish association football player (born 2005)

Personal information
- Full name: Ruairi Conor McConville
- Date of birth: 1 May 2005 (age 21)
- Place of birth: Belfast, Northern Ireland
- Height: 1.93 m (6 ft 4 in)
- Position: Defender

Team information
- Current team: Norwich City
- Number: 15

Youth career
- –2021: Linfield
- 2021–2024: Brighton & Hove Albion

Senior career*
Years	Team	Apps	(Gls)
2024–2025	Brighton & Hove Albion	0	(0)
2025–	Norwich City	40	(1)

International career^{‡}
2021	Northern Ireland U17	3	(0)
2022–2024	Northern Ireland U19	2	(0)
2023–	Northern Ireland U21	4	(0)
2024–	Northern Ireland	18	(0)
- * Club domestic league appearances and goals as of 22:32, 20 September 2026 (UTC) ‡ National team caps and goals as of 00:10, 18 November 2026 (UTC)

Ruairi Conor McConville (born 1 May 2005) is a Northern Irish footballer who plays as a centre-back or right-back for EFL Championship club Norwich City and the Northern Ireland national team.

== Club career ==
=== Brighton ===
From Belfast, he joined the Brighton & Hove Albion academy in 2021 from Linfield. He spent his first season with the club's under-18 side. He made the step up to the under-21s during the 2022–23 season. In December 2022, he signed a new professional contract with the club that ran into the summer of 2025. He made his professional debut for Brighton on 11 January 2025, appearing as a substitute in a 4-0 FA Cup third round away victory against Norwich City.

=== Norwich ===
In February 2025, McConville left Brighton to join Norwich City on a five and a half-year contract for an undisclosed fee. He made his debut for Norwich City in the EFL Championship in a 4-2 home win against Stoke City on 22 February 2025, appearing as a substitute late in the second half.

== International career ==
A Northern Ireland U16 and U17 international, he was captain of the Northern Ireland U19 side. He made his debut for Northern Ireland U21 in November 2023 against England U21.

In November 2024, he was called-up for the first time to the senior team for their UEFA Nations League matches against Belarus and Luxembourg. He made his senior debut on 15 November 2024 in a 2–0 home win over Belarus. He started his first senior international match for Northern Ireland a few days later, in a 2-2 away draw with Luxembourg on 18 November 2024, in the UEFA Nations League.

== Career statistics ==
As of match played on 20 September 2026

Appearances and goals by club, season and competition
Club	Season	League			FA Cup		League Cup		Other		Total	
Club	Season	Division	Apps	Goals	Apps	Goals	Apps	Goals	Apps	Goals	Apps	Goals
Brighton & Hove Albion U21	2023–24	—	—		—		—		5 (Note: Appearances in EFL Trophy)	1	5	1
Brighton & Hove Albion U21	2024–25	—	—		—		—		1	0	1	0
Brighton & Hove Albion U21	Total		0	0	0	0	0	0	6	1	6	1
Brighton & Hove Albion	2024–25	Premier League	0	0	1	0	0	0	—		1	0
Norwich City	2024–25	Championship	8	0	—		—		—		8	0
Norwich City	2025–26	Championship	25	0	3	0	1	0	—		29	0
Norwich City	2026–27	Championship	7	1	0	0	2	0	—		9	1
Norwich City	Total		40	1	3	0	3	0	—		46	1
Career total			39	1	4	0	3	0	6	1	52	2

=== International ===
As of match played 17 November 2026

Appearances and goals by national team and year
National team	Year	Apps	Goals
Northern Ireland	2024	2	0
Northern Ireland	2025	7	0
Northern Ireland	2026	9	0
Total		18	0
