= Matěj Jurásek =

Czech footballer (born 2003)

Personal information
- Full name: Matěj Jurásek
- Date of birth: 30 August 2003 (age 23)
- Place of birth: Karviná, Czech Republic
- Height: 1.81 m (5 ft 11 in)
- Position: Right winger

Team information
- Current team: Sparta Prague (on loan from Norwich City)
- Number: 31

Youth career
- 2010–2018: Karviná
- 2018–2020: Slavia Prague

Senior career*
| Years | Team | Apps | (Gls) |
| 2021–2023 | Slavia Prague B | 11 | (4) |
| 2021 | → Vlašim (loan) | 13 | (1) |
| 2021 | → Karviná (loan) | 7 | (0) |
| 2022 | → Vlašim (loan) | 16 | (2) |
| 2020–2025 | Slavia Prague | 62 | (12) |
| 2025– | Norwich City | 18 | (0) |
| 2026– | → Sparta Prague (loan) | 1 | (0) |

International career^{‡}
| 2018 | Czech Republic U16 | 2 | (0) |
| 2020 | Czech Republic U17 | 3 | (0) |
| 2021–2022 | Czech Republic U19 | 7 | (1) |
| 2022 | Czech Republic U20 | 2 | (2) |
| 2022–2024 | Czech Republic U21 | 12 | (2) |
| 2024– | Czech Republic | 4 | (1) |
- * Club domestic league appearances and goals as of 14:06, 9 August 2026 (UTC) ‡ National team caps and goals as of 30 June 2024

Matěj Jurásek (born 30 August 2003) is a Czech professional football player who plays as a right winger for Czech First League club Sparta Prague, on loan from EFL Championship club Norwich City, and the Czech Republic national team.

== Club career ==
Jurásek came through the ranks of Karviná before joining Slavia Prague youth system in summer 2018. He made his professional debut for Slavia Prague on 21 November 2020, coming on as substitute in the 79th minute during the 6–0 Czech First League away victory against SFC Opava. Later that year, he also played in the Europa League, before choosing to join Vlašim on loan in 2021, in order to gain more experience during the second part of the season, playing in the second-tier FNL.

Jurásek scored his first Czech First League goal in a home game against Banik Ostrava on 6 November 2022. Entering the game as a 70th-minute substitute with the score 1–1, he put Slavia into the lead in the 73rd minute. Jurásek scored a second goal in the same match, shooting from 25 metres and making the final score 3–1. At the end of the 2022–23 season, Jurásek was in Slavia's starting lineup for the Czech Cup final, with his side winning the trophy after a 2–0 victory.

On 16 January 2025, Jurásek signed a contract with EFL Championship club Norwich City until June 2030.

On 14 August 2026, Jurásek joined Sparta Prague on a one-year loan deal with an option to make the transfer permanent.

== International career ==
Jurásek is a Czech Republic youth international, later representing the country at the 2023 UEFA European Under-21 Championship. He made his debut for the Czech Republic national team in a friendly match against Armenia on 26 March 2024. Jurásek was named in the Czech Republic squad for UEFA Euro 2024 by head coach Ivan Hašek in May 2024.

== Career statistics ==
=== Club ===
As of match played 8 August 2026

| Club | Season | League | | | National cup (Note: Includes Czech Cup, FA Cup) | | League cup (Note: Includes EFL Cup) | | Europe | | Other | | Total | |
| Club | Season | Division | Apps | Goals | Apps | Goals | Apps | Goals | Apps | Goals | Apps | Goals | Apps | Goals |
|---|---|---|---|---|---|---|---|---|---|---|---|---|---|---|
| Slavia Prague | 2020–21 | Czech First League | 2 | 0 | 0 | 0 | — | | 1 (Note: Appearances in UEFA Europa League) | 0 | — | | 3 | 0 |
| Slavia Prague | 2021–22 | Czech First League | 0 | 0 | 0 | 0 | — | | 0 | 0 | — | | 0 | 0 |
| Slavia Prague | 2022–23 | Czech First League | 21 | 6 | 5 | 1 | — | | 5 (Note: Appearances in UEFA Europa Conference League) | 0 | — | | 31 | 7 |
| Slavia Prague | 2023–24 | Czech First League | 25 | 5 | 1 | 1 | — | | 7 | 2 | — | | 33 | 8 |
| Slavia Prague | 2024–25 | Czech First League | 14 | 1 | 1 | 0 | — | | 9 (Note: Three appearances in UEFA Champions League, six appearances and one goal in UEFA Europa League) | 1 | — | | 24 | 2 |
| Slavia Prague | Total | | 62 | 12 | 7 | 2 | 0 | 0 | 22 | 3 | 0 | 0 | 91 | 17 |
| Vlašim (loan) | 2020–21 | Czech National Football League | 13 | 1 | 1 | 0 | — | | — | | — | | 14 | 1 |
| Karviná (loan) | 2021–22 | Czech First League | 7 | 0 | 3 | 1 | — | | — | | — | | 10 | 1 |
| Vlašim (loan) | 2021–22 | Czech National Football League | 16 | 2 | — | | — | | — | | — | | 16 | 2 |
| Norwich City | 2024–25 | Championship | 2 | 0 | 0 | 0 | — | | — | | — | | 2 | 0 |
| Norwich City | 2025–26 | Championship | 16 | 0 | 1 | 1 | 2 | 0 | — | | — | | 19 | 1 |
| Norwich City | 2026–27 | Championship | 0 | 0 | 0 | 0 | 1 | 0 | — | | — | | 1 | 0 |
| Norwich City | Total | | 18 | 0 | 1 | 1 | 3 | 0 | 0 | 0 | 0 | 0 | 22 | 1 |
| Career total | | | 116 | 15 | 12 | 4 | 3 | 0 | 22 | 3 | 0 | 0 | 153 | 22 |

== Honours ==
Slavia Prague

- Czech Cup: 2022–23
