= Bruno Alves (footballer, born 2005) =

Brazilian footballer (born 2005)

Personal information
- Full name: Bruno Ferreira Alves
- Date of birth: 4 August 2005 (age 21)
- Place of birth: Paranapuã, Brazil
- Height: 1.86 m (6 ft 1 in)
- Position: Defender

Team information
- Current team: Norwich City (on loan from Cruzeiro)
- Number: 28

Youth career
- –2025: Cruzeiro

Senior career*
Years	Team	Apps	(Gls)
2025–	Cruzeiro	0	(0)
2026–	→ Norwich City (loan)	0	(0)

International career^{‡}
2025	Brazil U20	3	(0)
- * Club domestic league appearances and goals as of 9 May 2026 ‡ National team caps and goals as of 4 October 2025

Bruno Ferreira Alves (born 4 August 2005) is a Brazilian professional footballer who plays as a defender for club Norwich City, on loan from Campeonato Brasileiro Série A club Cruzeiro.

== Club career ==
As a youth player, Alves joined the youth academy of Brazilian side Cruzeiro EC. Brazilian newspaper O Tempo wrote in 2025 that he was "one of the standout players in the under-20 team" while playing for the club. Ahead of the 2026–27 season, he was sent on loan to English side Norwich City.

== International career ==
Alves is a Brazil youth international. During September and October 2025, he played for the Brazil national under-20 football team at the 2025 FIFA U-20 World Cup.

== Style of play ==
Alves plays as a defender. Two-footed, he is known for his passing ability.
