= Ben Chrisene =

English footballer

Personal information
- Full name: Benjamin Joshua Chrisene
- Date of birth: 12 January 2004 (age 22)
- Height: 1.83 m (6 ft 0 in)
- Position: Left-back

Team information
- Current team: Norwich City
- Number: 14

Youth career
- 2015–2019: Exeter City

Senior career*
Years	Team	Apps	(Gls)
2019–2020	Exeter City	1	(0)
2020–2024	Aston Villa	0	(0)
2022–2023	→ Kilmarnock (loan)	13	(0)
2024	→ Blackburn Rovers (loan)	16	(0)
2024–	Norwich City	61	(3)

International career^{‡}
2019	England U15	3	(0)
2019–2020	England U16	7	(0)
2020–2022	England U17	6	(0)
2022	England U19	2	(0)
2024	England U20	4	(0)
2024–	England U21	1	(0)
- * Club domestic league appearances and goals as of 09:11, 22 November 2026 (UTC) ‡ National team caps and goals as of 13:31, 17 November 2024 (UTC)

Benjamin Joshua Chrisene (born 12 January 2004) is an English professional footballer who plays as a left-back for EFL Championship club Norwich City.

He is a product of the Exeter City academy and made five first-team appearances during the 2019–20 season, at the age of fifteen. He subsequently was signed by Aston Villa in August 2020 and joined their academy side, before making his senior debut in January 2021. After a loan spell at Blackburn Rovers in early 2024, he signed for Norwich City in July 2024.

Chrisene has represented England at youth level, appearing from under-15 to under-21 levels.

== Club career ==
=== Exeter City ===
Chrisene began his career with Exeter City at the age of 11, and was linked with a move to Liverpool in the summer of 2018.

He made his debut for Exeter City on 13 August 2019, in the EFL Cup against Coventry City, at the age of 15 years, 7 months, and 1 day, becoming the club's youngest ever player, beating Ethan Ampadu's record.

He made his league debut as a late substitute in a 2–0 home win against Cambridge United on 11 January 2020.

=== Aston Villa ===
On 19 August 2020, Chrisene joined Premier League side Aston Villa for an undisclosed fee, initially joining their academy. On 17 November 2020, Chrisene made his debut for Aston Villa in a 3–1 defeat to Carlisle United as part of an invited Under-21 squad in the EFL Trophy. Chrisene was named in the Aston Villa starting line-up for his senior debut on 8 January 2021 in an FA Cup third-round tie against Liverpool. A few days later he signed his first professional contract.

On 24 May 2021, Chrisene was part of the Aston Villa squad that lifted the FA Youth Cup. Chrisene scored the opening goal as Villa beat Liverpool U18s 2–1 in the final.

On 24 January 2022, Chrisene signed a new contract with Aston Villa, with manager Steven Gerrard saying he was "excited" to help him become a Premier League player. On 9 February, Chrisene featured in a Premier League squad for the first time, as an unused substitute in a 3–3 draw against Leeds United.

On 25 August 2022, Chrisene signed for Scottish Premiership club Kilmarnock on a season-long loan. Chrisene made his debut for Kilmarnock on 27 August 2022, playing 90 minutes in a 2–1 home victory over Motherwell. In January 2023, he tore his medial ligament, an injury that would ultimately rule him out for the remainder of the season.

On 5 January 2024, Chrisene joined Championship club Blackburn Rovers on loan until the end of the 2023–24 season.

=== Norwich City ===
On 30 July 2024, Chrisene joined Championship side Norwich City for an undisclosed fee, signing a four-year deal with the club having an option of a further year.

== International career ==
Chrisene has represented England at under-15, under-16, and under-17 youth levels.

On 21 September 2022, Chrisene made his England U19 debut during a 2–0 2023 U19 EURO qualifying win over Montenegro in Denmark.

On 7 June 2024, Chrisene made his England U20 debut during a 2–1 win over Sweden at Stadion ŠRC Sesvete.

On 15 November 2024, Chrisene made his U21 debut as a substitute during a goalless draw with Spain in La Línea de la Concepción.

== Career statistics ==
As of match played 21 November 2026

Appearances and goals by club, season and competition
Club	Season	League			National cup (Note: Includes FA Cup)		League cup (Note: Includes EFL Cup, Scottish League Cup)		Other		Total	
Club	Season	Division	Apps	Goals	Apps	Goals	Apps	Goals	Apps	Goals	Apps	Goals
Exeter City	2019–20	League Two	1	0	0	0	1	0	3 (Note: Appearance(s) in EFL Trophy)	0	5	0
Aston Villa	2020–21	Premier League	0	0	1	0	0	0	1 (Note: Appearance(s) for U21 side in EFL Trophy)	0	2	0
Aston Villa	2021–22	Premier League	0	0	0	0	0	0	1	0	1	0
Aston Villa	2022–23	Premier League	0	0	0	0	0	0	0	0	0	0
Aston Villa	2023–24	Premier League	0	0	0	0	0	0	2	0	0	0
Aston Villa	Total		0	0	1	0	0	0	4	0	5	0
Kilmarnock (loan)	2022–23	Scottish Premiership	13	0	0	0	3	0	0	0	16	0
Blackburn Rovers (loan)	2023–24	Championship	16	0	2	0	0	0	0	0	18	0
Norwich City	2024–25	Championship	26	1	1	0	1	0	0	0	28	1
Norwich City	2025–26	Championship	21	1	3	1	2	0	0	0	26	2
Norwich City	2026–27	Championship	14	1	0	0	1	1	0	0	15	2
Norwich City	Total		61	3	4	1	4	1	0	0	69	5
Career total			91	3	7	1	8	1	7	0	113	5

== Honours ==
Aston Villa U18

- FA Youth Cup: 2020–21
