= Jacob Wright =

English footballer (born 2005)

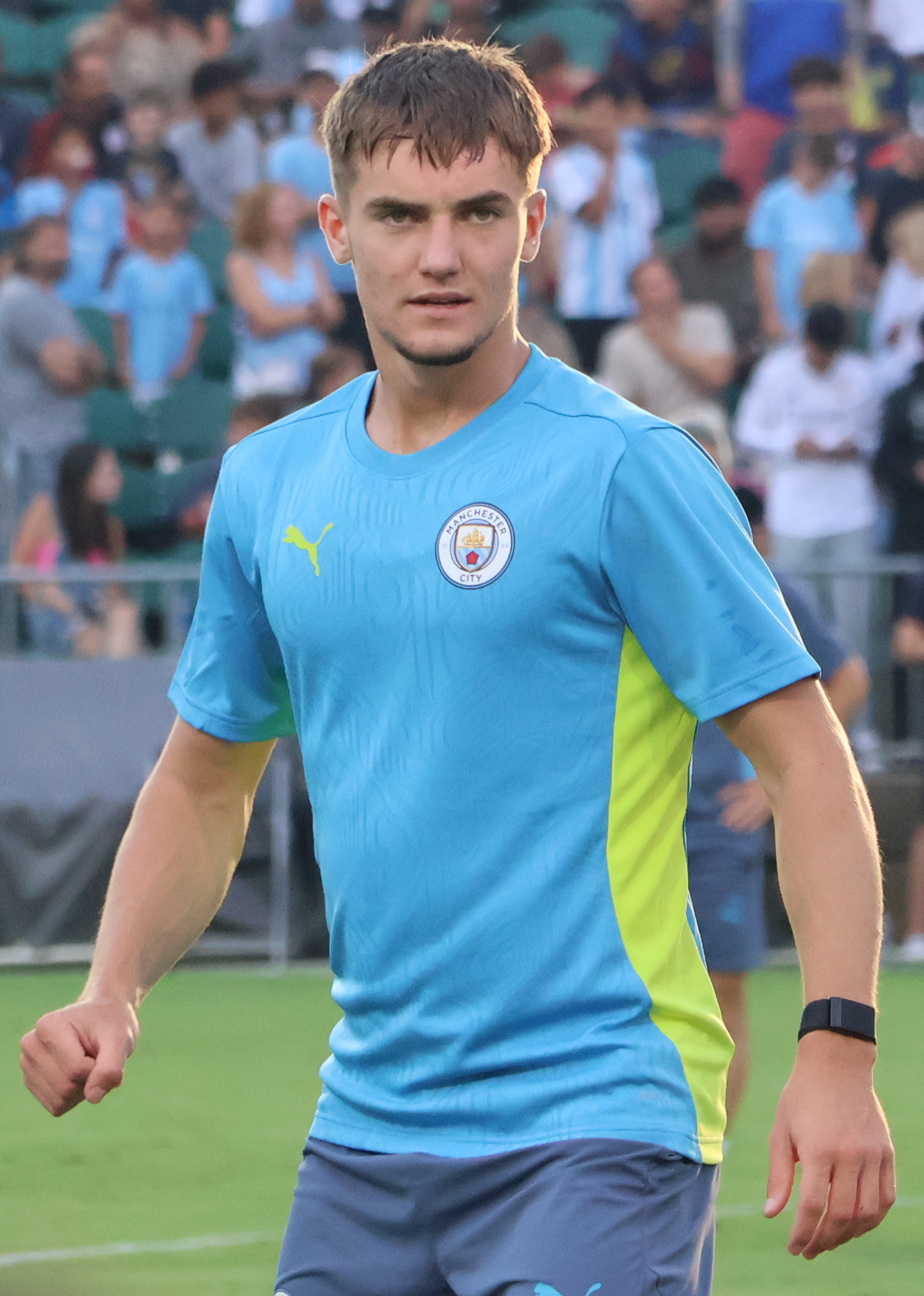
- Wright training with Manchester City in 2024

Personal information
- Full name: Jacob Anthony Wright
- Date of birth: 21 September 2005 (age 21)
- Place of birth: Manchester, England
- Height: 1.78 m (5 ft 10 in)
- Position: Midfielder

Team information
- Current team: Norwich City
- Number: 16

Youth career
- 2014–2025: Manchester City

Senior career*
Years	Team	Apps	(Gls)
2023–2025	Manchester City	0	(0)
2025	→ Norwich City (loan)	15	(0)
2025–	Norwich City	36	(2)

International career^{‡}
2022	England U16	2	(0)
2022–2023	England U17	2	(0)
2022–2023	England U18	5	(0)
2023	England U19	2	(1)
2024–	England U20	5	(0)
- * Club domestic league appearances and goals as of 10:14, 16 September 2026 (UTC) ‡ National team caps and goals as of 19:33, 23 March 2025 (UTC)

Jacob Anthony Wright (born 21 September 2005) is an English professional footballer who plays as a midfielder for EFL Championship club Norwich City. He is an England youth international.

== Club career ==
=== Manchester City ===
Wright played for the Manchester City academy in the 2023–24 EFL Trophy. He was also included in the Manchester City senior squad that travelled to Saudi Arabia to play in the 2023 FIFA Club World Cup. He was then named amongst the substitutes for City's FA Cup match against Huddersfield Town on 7 January 2024, and made his senior debut as a second-half substitute.

On 6 March 2024, Wright made his UEFA Champions League debut in City's round of 16 victory against Copenhagen, coming on for Erling Haaland in the closing minutes.

=== Norwich City ===
On 4 February 2025, Wright joined Norwich City on loan for the remainder of the 2024–25 season with an option to buy. On 28 May, Norwich City triggered the option to purchase Wright, officially joining the club on 1 June, signing a four-year contract with an option for a further year, for an initial reported fee of £2.3 million.

== International career ==
He is an England youth international.

== Career statistics ==
As of match played 10 October 2026

Appearances and goals by club, season and competition
Club	Season	League			FA Cup		League Cup		Europe		Other		Total	
Club	Season	Division	Apps	Goals	Apps	Goals	Apps	Goals	Apps	Goals	Apps	Goals	Apps	Goals
Manchester City U21	2023–24	—			—		—		—		3 (Note: Appearance(s) in EFL Trophy)	0	3	0
Manchester City U21	2024–25	—			—		—		—		1	1	1	1
Manchester City U21	Total		—		—		—		—		4	1	4	1
Manchester City	2023–24	Premier League	0	0	1	0	0	0	1 (Note: Appearance in UEFA Champions League)	0	0	0	2	0
Manchester City	2024–25	Premier League	0	0	0	0	2	0	0	0	0	0	2	0
Manchester City	Total		0	0	1	0	2	0	1	0	0	0	4	0
Norwich City (loan)	2024–25	EFL Championship	15	0	—		—		—		—		15	0
Norwich City	2025–26	EFL Championship	28	0	2	0	1	0	—		—		31	0
Norwich City	2026–27	EFL Championship	8	2	0	0	3	0	—		—		1	0
Norwich City	Total		36	2	2	0	4	0	0	0	0	0	39	1
Career total			51	2	3	0	6	0	1	0	4	1	65	3
