= Jack Stacey =

English footballer (born 1996)

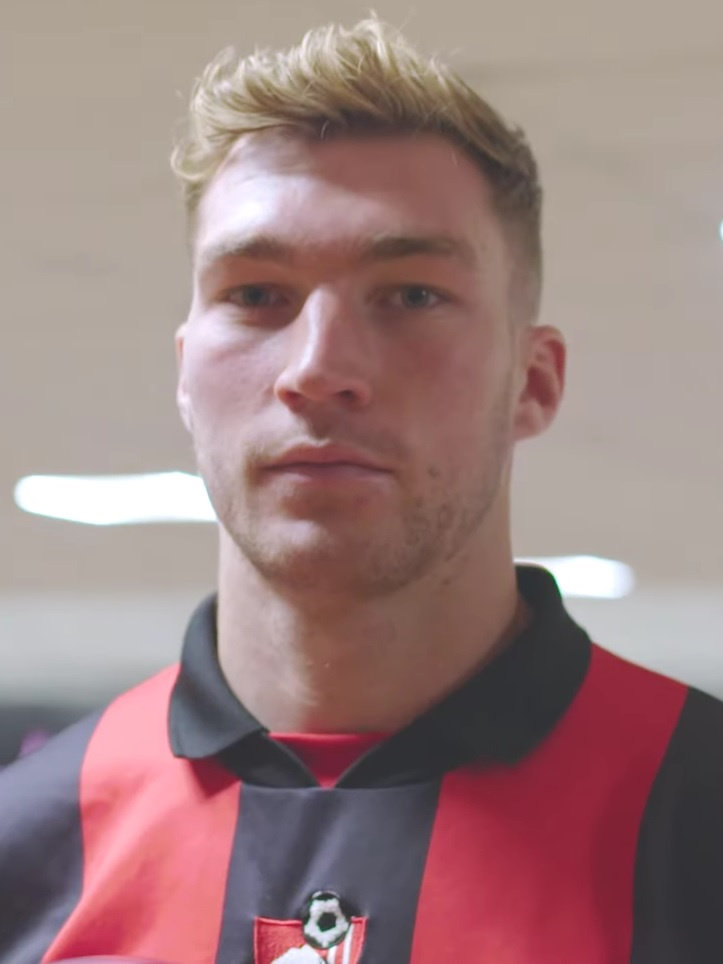
- Stacey in 2019

Personal information
- Full name: Jack William Stacey
- Date of birth: 6 April 1996 (age 30)
- Place of birth: Ascot, England
- Height: 5 ft 11 in (1.80 m)
- Position: Right-back

Team information
- Current team: Norwich City
- Number: 3

Youth career
- 2004–2013: Reading

Senior career*
Years	Team	Apps	(Gls)
2013–2017	Reading	6	(0)
2015	→ Barnet (loan)	2	(0)
2016	→ Carlisle United (loan)	9	(2)
2016–2017	→ Exeter City (loan)	34	(0)
2017–2019	Luton Town	86	(5)
2019–2023	AFC Bournemouth	83	(1)
2023–	Norwich City	129	(6)
- * Club domestic league appearances and goals as of 03:35, 29 September 2026 (UTC)

Jack William Stacey (born 6 April 1996) is an English professional footballer who plays as a right-back for EFL Championship club Norwich City.

== Career ==
=== Reading ===
Born in Bracknell, Berkshire, Stacey began his career with the youth system at Reading as an eight-year-old in 2004, before signing his first professional contract with the club on 10 December 2013 until the end of 2015–16. He made his professional debut as a 90th-minute substitute for Jake Taylor in a 1–0 victory at home to Ipswich Town on 16 August 2014 and finished 2014–15 with six appearances. Stacey signed a new contract with Reading on 19 October 2015 to keep him at the club until the summer of 2019.

On 23 November 2015, Stacey joined League Two club Barnet on a short-term loan until 26 December. He debuted a day later in a 4–2 defeat away to Notts County and completed the loan spell with only two appearances. On 24 March 2016, Stacey joined League Two club Carlisle United on loan until the end of 2015–16. He made his debut a day later in a 0–0 draw away to Yeovil Town and scored his first goal in the following match, a 3–2 victory at home to Bristol Rovers. His second goal for Carlisle came on 19 April against Luton Town, when he scored a consolation goal in the 61st minute to make the score 2–1 and completed the loan spell with nine appearances and two goals.

On 31 August 2016, Stacey joined League Two club Exeter City on loan until 23 January 2017. He debuted three days later in a 3–2 victory away to Colchester United. His loan was extended until the end of 2016–17 on 23 January 2017, having made 19 appearances for Exeter up to that point in the season. He played in both legs of the play-off semi-final victory over his former loan club Carlisle United, scoring a stoppage time winner in the second leg to make the score 6–5 on aggregate. The goal was voted Exeter's Goal of the Decade at the end of 2019. Stacey started in the 2017 EFL League Two play-off final at Wembley Stadium on 28 May 2017, in which Exeter lost 2–1 to Blackpool. He completed the loan spell with 38 appearances and one goal.

=== Luton Town ===
On 26 June 2017, Stacey signed a two-year contract with League Two club Luton Town for an undisclosed fee.

His contract was extended by a further year at the end of the 2017–18 season after a promotion clause was triggered as a result of Luton's promotion to League One.

=== AFC Bournemouth ===
Stacey signed for Premier League club AFC Bournemouth on 8 July 2019 on a four-year contract for a reported £4 million. He scored his first goal for Bournemouth in a 3–2 win against Blackburn Rovers on 12 September 2020.

=== Norwich City ===
Stacey signed on a three-year deal for EFL Championship club Norwich City on 31 May 2023. In April 2025, Stacey was awarded Championship Community Player of the Season at the EFL Awards for his volunteering work with Norwich City Community Sports Foundation.

== Career statistics ==
As of match played 12 September 2026

Appearances and goals by club, season and competition
Club	Season	League			FA Cup		League Cup		Other		Total	
Club	Season	Division	Apps	Goals	Apps	Goals	Apps	Goals	Apps	Goals	Apps	Goals
Reading	2014–15	Championship	6	0	0	0	0	0	—		6	0
Reading	2015–16	Championship	0	0	0	0	0	0	—		0	0
Reading	2016–17	Championship	0	0	—		0	0	—		0	0
Reading	Total		6	0	0	0	0	0	—		6	0
Barnet (loan)	2015–16	League Two	2	0	—		—		—		2	0
Carlisle United (loan)	2015–16	League Two	9	2	—		—		—		9	2
Reading U23	2016–17	—			—		—		1 (Note: Appearance in EFL Trophy)	1	1	1
Exeter City (loan)	2016–17	League Two	34	0	1	0	—		3 (Note: Appearances in League Two play-offs)	1	38	1
Luton Town	2017–18	League Two	41	1	2	0	1	0	1	0	45	1
Luton Town	2018–19	League One	45	4	4	0	1	0	0	0	50	4
Luton Town	Total		86	5	6	0	2	0	1	0	95	5
AFC Bournemouth	2019–20	Premier League	19	0	0	0	1	0	—		20	0
AFC Bournemouth	2020–21	Championship	30	1	4	0	1	0	2 (Note: Appearances in Championship play-offs)	0	37	1
AFC Bournemouth	2021–22	Championship	25	0	1	0	1	0	0	0	27	0
AFC Bournemouth	2022–23	Premier League	10	0	1	0	3	0	0	0	14	0
AFC Bournemouth	Total		84	1	6	0	6	0	2	0	97	1
Norwich City	2023–24	Championship	46	1	2	0	1	0	2	0	51	1
Norwich City	2024–25	Championship	41	2	1	0	2	0	—		44	2
Norwich City	2025–26	Championship	36	2	3	0	0	0	—		39	2
Norwich City	2026–27	Championship	6	1	0	0	2	0	—		8	1
Norwich City	Total		129	6	6	0	5	0	2	0	142	6
Career total			327	12	18	0	12	0	9	2	367	14

== Honours ==
Reading

- U21 Premier League Cup: 2013–14

Bournemouth

- EFL Championship second-place promotion: 2021–22

Luton Town

- EFL League One: 2018–19
- EFL League Two runner-up: 2017–18

Individual

- Luton Town Young Player of the Season: 2017–18
- Luton Town Player of the Season: 2018–19
