= Ante Crnac =

Croatian footballer (born 2003)

Personal information
- Full name: Ante Crnac
- Date of birth: 17 December 2003 (age 22)
- Place of birth: Sisak, Croatia
- Height: 1.90 m (6 ft 3 in)
- Positions: Forward; attacking midfielder

Team information
- Current team: Norwich City
- Number: 17

Youth career
- –2013: Moslavina
- 2013–2021: Dinamo Zagreb

Senior career*
Years	Team	Apps	(Gls)
2021–2022	Dinamo Zagreb II	18	(2)
2022–2023	Slaven Belupo	53	(11)
2023–2024	Raków Częstochowa	31	(9)
2024–	Norwich City	55	(7)

International career^{‡}
2017	Croatia U14	2	(0)
2017–2018	Croatia U15	8	(1)
2018	Croatia U16	2	(0)
2019	Croatia U17	3	(0)
2021	Croatia U19	2	(0)
2022	Croatia U20	2	(0)
2022–	Croatia U21	10	(0)
- * Club domestic league appearances and goals as of 15:50, 16 November 2026 (UTC) ‡ National team caps and goals as of 17 December 2024

Ante Crnac (born 17 December 2003) is a Croatian professional footballer who plays as a forward or attacking midfielder for EFL Championship club Norwich City.

== Club career ==
On 24 January 2022, Crnac moved from Dinamo Zagreb and signed a three-year contract with Slaven Belupo.

On 1 September 2023, he joined defending Polish champions Raków Częstochowa on a five-year deal, for a fee reported to be over €1 million.

On 22 August 2024, he joined Norwich City on a four-year contract, for a reported fee of €11 million. In October 2025, it was announced that he would miss the remainder of the 2025-26 season after undergoing surgery on a damaged ACL. Crnac returned to first-team action on the 25 August 2026, and scored in an EFL Cup victory against Cardiff City.

== International career ==
He has been capped for various Croatian youth national teams.

== Career statistics ==
As of match played 3 November 2026

Appearances and goals by club, season and competition
Club	Season	League			National cup (Note: Includes Croatian Football Cup, Polish Cup, FA Cup)		League cup (Note: Includes EFL Cup)		Europe		Total	
Club	Season	Division	Apps	Goals	Apps	Goals	Apps	Goals	Apps	Goals	Apps	Goals
Dinamo Zagreb II	2020–21	2. HNL	4	2	—		—		—		12	2
Dinamo Zagreb II	2021–22	2. HNL	14	0	—		—		—		14	0
Dinamo Zagreb II	Total		18	2	—		—		—		18	2
Slaven Belupo	2021–22	Prva HNL	12	2	—		—		—		12	2
Slaven Belupo	2022–23	Prva HNL	35	6	3	0	—		—		38	6
Slaven Belupo	2023–24	Prva HNL	6	3	—		—		—		6	3
Slaven Belupo	Total		53	11	3	0	—		—		56	11
Raków Częstochowa	2023–24	Ekstraklasa	26	8	3	0	—		6 (Note: Appearances in UEFA Europa League)	0	35	8
Raków Częstochowa	2024–25	Ekstraklasa	5	1	0	0	—		—		5	1
Raków Częstochowa	Total		31	9	3	0	—		6	0	40	9
Norwich City	2024–25	Championship	38	7	1	0	1	0	—		40	7
Norwich City	2025–26	Championship	11	0	0	0	1	0	—		12	0
Norwich City	2026–27	Championship	6	0	0	0	2	1	—		8	1
Norwich City	Total		55	7	1	0	4	1	—		60	8
Career total			157	29	7	0	3	1	6	0	174	30
