= 2024–25 Norwich City F.C. season =

123rd season in existence of Norwich City FC

Norwich City
2024–25 season
- Owner: Delia Smith (until 23 October 2024); Michael Wynn-Jones (until 23 October 2024); Mark Attanasio
- Head coach: Johannes Hoff Thorup (until 22 April 2025); Jack Wilshere (interim, from 22 April 2025)
- Stadium: Carrow Road
- Championship: 13th
- FA Cup: Third round
- EFL Cup: Second round
- Top goalscorer: League: Borja Sainz (18); All: Borja Sainz (19)
- Average home league attendance: 26,316
Home colours	Away colours	Third colours

The 2024–25 season was the 123rd season in the history of Norwich City and their third consecutive season in the Championship. In addition to the domestic league, the club also competed in the season's editions of the FA Cup and the EFL Cup.

== First-team squad ==
As of 3 February 2025

No.	Name	Position	Nationality	Place of birth	Date of birth (age)	Signed from	Date signed	Fee	Contract end
Goalkeepers
1	Angus Gunn	GK	(Scotland)	(England) Norwich	22 January 1996 (age 30)	Southampton	1 July 2021	£5,000,000	30 June 2025
12	George Long	GK	(England)	Sheffield	5 November 1993 (age 33)	Millwall	17 August 2023	Free Transfer	30 June 2025
Defenders
3	Jack Stacey	RB	(England)	Ascot	6 April 1996 (age 30)	Bournemouth	1 July 2023	Free Transfer	30 June 2026
4	Shane Duffy	CB	(Republic of Ireland)	Derry	1 January 1992 (age 34)	Fulham	1 July 2023	Free Transfer	30 June 2026
6	Callum Doyle	CB	(England)	Manchester	3 October 2003 (age 23)	Manchester City	6 August 2024	Loan	30 June 2025
14	Ben Chrisene	LB	(England)	Exeter	12 January 2004 (age 22)	Aston Villa	30 July 2024	Undisclosed	30 June 2028
15	Ruairi McConville	CB	(Northern Ireland)	Belfast	1 May 2005 (age 21)	Brighton & Hove Albion	3 February 2025	Undisclosed	30 June 2030
33	José Córdoba	CB	(Panama)	Panama City	3 June 2001 (age 25)	(Bulgaria) Levski Sofia	14 June 2024	Undisclosed	30 June 2028
35	Kellen Fisher	RB	(England)	Bexley	5 May 2004 (age 22)	Bromley	16 June 2023	Undisclosed	30 June 2026
Midfielders
8	Liam Gibbs	CM	(England)	Bury St Edmunds	16 December 2002 (age 23)	Ipswich Town	23 July 2021	Undisclosed	30 June 2028
11	Emiliano Marcondes	AM	(Denmark)	Hvidovre	9 March 1995 (age 31)	Free agent	4 October 2024	Free	30 June 2025
16	Jacob Wright	DM	(England)	Manchester	21 September 2005 (age 21)	Manchester City	4 February 2025	Loan	30 June 2025
18	Forson Amankwah	CM	(Ghana)		31 December 2002 (age 23)	(Austria) Red Bull Salzburg	9 August 2024	Undisclosed	30 June 2028
19	Jacob Sørensen	DM	(Denmark)	Esbjerg	3 March 1998 (age 28)	(Denmark) Esbjerg	27 July 2020	Undisclosed	30 June 2024
20	Anis Ben Slimane	CM	(Tunisia)	(Denmark) Copenhagen	16 March 2001 (age 25)	Sheffield United	30 August 2024	Undisclosed	30 June 2028
23	Kenny McLean	CM	(Scotland)	Rutherglen	8 January 1992 (age 34)	(Scotland) Aberdeen	22 January 2018	£200,000	30 June 2026
26	Marcelino Núñez	CM	(Chile)	Recoleta	1 March 2000 (age 26)	(Chile) Universidad Católica	2 August 2022	£3,200,000	30 June 2026
29	Oscar Schwartau	AM	(Denmark)	Sengeløse	17 May 2006 (age 20)	(Denmark) Brøndby	24 August 2024	Undisclosed	30 June 2028
Forwards
7	Borja Sainz	RW	(Spain)	Leioa	1 February 2001 (age 25)	(Turkey) Giresunspor	30 June 2023	Free Transfer	30 June 2026
9	Josh Sargent	CF	(United States)	O'Fallon	20 February 2000 (age 26)	(Germany) Werder Bremen	9 August 2021	£8,000,000	30 June 2028
10	Matěj Jurásek	RW	(Czech Republic)	Karviná	30 August 2003 (age 23)	(Czech Republic) Slavia Prague	3 February 2025	Undisclosed	30 June 2030
17	Ante Crnac	CF	(Croatia)	Sisak	17 December 2003 (age 22)	(Poland) Raków Częstochowa	22 August 2024	Undisclosed	30 June 2028
22	Lewis Dobbin	LW	(England)	Stoke-on-Trent	3 January 2003 (age 23)	Aston Villa	3 January 2025	Loan	30 June 2025
25	Onel Hernández	LW	(Cuba)	Morón	1 February 1993 (age 33)	(Germany) Eintracht Braunschweig	25 January 2018	Undisclosed	30 June 2025
42	Tony Springett	RW	(Republic of Ireland)	(England) Lewisham	22 September 2002 (age 24)	Academy	1 July 2021	—N/a	30 June 2025
Out on Loan
27	Jonathan Rowe	LW	(England)	Westminster	30 April 2003 (age 23)	Academy	1 January 2022	—N/a	30 June 2025
37	Archie Mair	GK	(Scotland)	Turriff	10 February 2001 (age 25)	Academy	1 July 2020	—N/a	30 June 2025
38	Daniel Barden	GK	(Wales)		2 January 2001 (age 25)	Arsenal	8 November 2018	Free Transfer	30 June 2024
40	Brad Hills	CB	(England)	Norwich	10 March 2004 (age 22)	Academy	1 July 2022	—N/a	30 June 2027
45	Jonathan Tomkinson	CB	(United States)	Plano	11 April 2002 (age 24)	(United States) FC Dallas	1 July 2019	Free Transfer	30 June 2024

== Transfers ==
=== In ===
Date	Pos.	Player	From	Fee	Ref.
14 June 2024	CB	(Panama) José Córdoba	(Bulgaria) Levski Sofia	Undisclosed	
3 July 2024	GK	(England) Tom Finch (Note: Initially signed for the U21s)	(England) Cambridge United	Free	
3 July 2024	RB	(Germany) Harmony Okwumo	(England) Charlton Athletic	Free	
8 July 2024	LB	(England) Lucien Mahovo	(England) Notts County	Undisclosed	
19 July 2024	CB	(England) Theo Adelusi	(England) Tottenham Hotspur	Free	
30 July 2024	LB	(England) Ben Chrisene	(England) Aston Villa	Undisclosed	
9 August 2024	CM	(Ghana) Forson Amankwah	(Austria) Red Bull Salzburg	Undisclosed	
22 August 2024	CF	(Croatia) Ante Crnac	(Poland) Raków Częstochowa	Undisclosed	
24 August 2024	AM	(Denmark) Oscar Schwartau	(Denmark) Brøndby	Undisclosed	
30 August 2024	AM	(Scotland) Brandon Forbes	(Scotland) Dundee United	Undisclosed	
30 August 2024	CM	(England) Billy Gee	(England) Chelsea	Free	
30 August 2024	CM	(England) AJ Bridge	(England) Middlesbrough	Undisclosed	
4 October 2024	AM	(Denmark) Emiliano Marcondes	(England) Bournemouth	Free	
13 January 2025	CM	(Tunisia) Anis Ben Slimane	(England) Sheffield United	Undisclosed	
29 January 2025	CM	(Scotland) Alan Domeracki	(Scotland) Dundee United	Undisclosed	
1 February 2025	CF	(England) Dylan Jones	(England) Plymouth Parkway	Free	
3 February 2025 (Note: Transfer was confirmed on 16 January 2025, but the player couldn’t be registered until 3 February 2025 due to a lack of available GBE spots.)	RW	(Czech Republic) Matěj Jurásek	(Czech Republic) Slavia Prague	Undisclosed	
3 February 2025	CB	(Northern Ireland) Ruairi McConville	(England) Brighton & Hove Albion	Undisclosed	
9 February 2025	CB	(England) Takudzwa Gwanzura (Note: Initially signed for the U18s)	(England) Blackpool	Undisclosed	

=== Out ===
Date	Pos	Player	To	Fee	Ref
1 July 2024	LW	(Greece) Christos Tzolis	(Germany) Fortuna Düsseldorf	Undisclosed	
4 August 2024	CM	(Brazil) Gabriel Sara	(Turkey) Galatasaray	£15,300,000	
14 August 2024	CF	(Republic of Ireland) Adam Idah	(Scotland) Celtic	Undisclosed	
30 August 2024	CF	(England) Abu Kamara	(England) Hull City	Undisclosed	
2 September 2024	CB	(South Africa) Waylon Renecke	(Denmark) Copenhagen	Undisclosed	
15 January 2025 (Note: Transfer was confirmed by both clubs on 31 December 2024, but it was officially completed when the Swiss transfer window opened on 15 January 2025.)	RW	(Switzerland) Christian Fassnacht	(Switzerland) Young Boys	Free	
31 January 2025	CB	(England) Jaden Warner	(Wales) Newport County	Free	

=== Loaned in ===
Date	Pos	Player	From	Date until	Ref
6 August 2024	CB	(England) Callum Doyle	(England) Manchester City	End of Season	
30 August 2024	CM	(Tunisia) Anis Ben Slimane	(England) Sheffield United	13 January 2025	
30 August 2024	RW	(England) Kaide Gordon	(England) Liverpool	13 January 2025	
3 January 2025	LW	(England) Lewis Dobbin	(England) Aston Villa	End of Season	
4 February 2025	DM	(England) Jacob Wright	(England) Manchester City	End of Season	

=== Loaned out ===
Date	Pos.	Player	To	Date until	Ref.
2 July 2024	GK	(Chile) Vicente Reyes	(England) Cambridge United	8 January 2025	
7 August 2024	CB	(Republic of Ireland) Emmanuel Adegboyega	(Scotland) Dundee United	End of Season	
17 August 2024	GK	(England) Ellis Craven	(England) Boston United	14 September 2024	
23 August 2024	LW	(England) Jonathan Rowe	(France) Marseille	End of Season (Note: Deal contains an obligation to buy at the end of the loan for an undisclosed fee.)	
30 August 2024	GK	(Wales) Daniel Barden	(England) Swindon Town	7 March 2025	
30 August 2024	CF	(England) Ken Aboh	(England) Stevenage	8 January 2025	
30 August 2024	CB	(England) Lewis Shipley	(England) Cheltenham Town	2 January 2025	
17 October 2024	CM	(England) Finley Welch	(England) Boston United	17 November 2024	
11 January 2025	GK	(Scotland) Archie Mair	(Scotland) Motherwell	End of Season	
16 January 2025	CB	(United States) Jonathan Tomkinson	(Scotland) Ross County	End of Season	
3 February 2025	CB	(England) Brad Hills	(England) Stockport County	End of Season	
3 February 2025	CF	(England) Ken Aboh	(England) Colchester United	End of Season	
11 February 2025	GK	(England) Caleb Ansen	(England) Altrincham	11 March 2025	
7 March 2025	CF	(England) Daniel Ogwuru	(England) Buxton	5 April 2025	

=== Released / Out of Contract ===
Date	Pos.	Player	Subsequent club	Join date	Ref.
30 June 2024	AM	(England) Dubem Eze	(England) Bolton Wanderers	1 July 2024	
30 June 2024	CB	(England) Ben Gibson	(England) Stoke City	1 July 2024	
30 June 2024	GK	(Scotland) Jon McCracken	(Scotland) Dundee	1 July 2024	
30 June 2024	LB	(Northern Ireland) Sean Stewart	(Northern Ireland) Cliftonville	3 July 2024	
30 June 2024	AM	(England) Michael Reindorf	(Wales) Cardiff City	4 July 2024	
30 June 2024	LB	(England) Sam McCallum	(England) Sheffield United	11 July 2024	
30 June 2024	LB	(Greece) Dimitris Giannoulis	(Germany) FC Augsburg	23 July 2024	
30 June 2024	CB	(England) Danny Batth	(England) Blackburn Rovers	1 August 2024	
30 June 2024	AM	(Scotland) Flynn Clarke	(England) Lowestoft Town	10 August 2024	
30 June 2024	CF	(United States) Kenny Coker	(England) Cray Wanderers	17 August 2024	
30 June 2024	CM	(England) Regan Riley	(England) Radcliffe	13 September 2024	
30 June 2024	LW	(England) Joe Duffy			
30 June 2024	CM	(England) Marcel McIntosh	(England) Lewes	25 October 2024	
30 June 2024	GK	(England) Joe Rose			
30 June 2024	RB	(England) Ben Watt			
1 August 2024	GK	(Northern Ireland) Dylan Berry	(England) Ebbsfleet United	3 August 2024	
22 August 2024	LB	(Portugal) Guilherme Montóia	(Portugal) Estrela Amadora	22 October 2024	
2 January 2025	CF	(England) Ashley Barnes	(England) Burnley	2 January 2025	
17 January 2025	CB	(Scotland) Grant Hanley	(England) Birmingham City	17 January 2025	

== Pre-season and friendlies ==
On 6 June, Norwich confirmed their first pre-season friendly against 2. Bundesliga club 1. FC Magdeburg. On 14 June 2024, they then announced two further friendlies against EFL League One clubs Stevenage and Northampton Town, with the remaining fixtures to be confirmed at a later date. A week later, a home friendly fixture versus St Pauli was added. On 8 July, a training camp in Austria along with a friendly against Hoffenheim was announced.

Win Draw Loss Fixtures

9 July 2024 Friendly	Stevenage	Cancelled	Norwich City	Stevenage
19:45 BST				Stadium: Lamex Stadium
Note: Fixture was cancelled due to unexpected pitch refurbishment works.

13 July 2024 Friendly	Northampton Town	0–3	Norwich City	Northampton
15:00 BST		Report	Rowe 4', 12'; Aboh 89'	Stadium: Sixfields Stadium; Attendance: 2,626; Referee: Andy Woolmer

17 July 2024 Friendly	Club Brugge	3–0	Norwich City	Roeselare, Belgium
18:30 CEST	Vanaken 4'; Nilsson 8'; Jutglà 58'	Report		Stadium: Schiervelde Stadion

20 July 2024 Friendly	Standard Liège	1–1	Norwich City	Liège, Belgium
15:00 CEST	Hautekiet 14'	Report	Sainz 9'	Stadium: Stade Maurice Dufrasne

26 July 2024 Friendly	Norwich City	0–1	1. FC Magdeburg	Norwich
18:45 BST		Report	Atik 17'	Stadium: Carrow Road; Attendance: 7,659

30 July 2024 Friendly	TSG Hoffenheim	2–2	Norwich City	St. Johann in Tirol, Austria
18:00 CEST	Bebou 9'; Bülter 25'	Report	Rowe 51'; Hills 66'	Stadium: Koasastadion

3 August 2024 Friendly	Norwich City	1–3	FC St. Pauli	Norwich
15:00 BST	Rowe 47'; Duffy (yellow card) 79'	Report	Irvine 18'; Guilavogui 31'; Eggestein 39'	Stadium: Carrow Road; Attendance: 9,959

== Competitions ==
=== Overall record ===
Competition	First match	Last match	Starting round	Final position	Record							
Competition	First match	Last match	Starting round	Final position	Pld	W	D	L	GF	GA	GD	Win %
Championship	10 August 2024	3 May 2025	Matchday 1	13th	46	14	15	17	71	68	+3	30.43
FA Cup	11 January 2025		Third round	Third round	1	0	0	1	0	4	−4	0.00
EFL Cup	13 August 2024	27 August 2024	First round	Second round	2	1	0	1	4	7	−3	50.00
Total					49	15	15	19	75	79	−4	30.61

Source: Soccerway

=== Championship ===
==== League table ====
Pos	Team	Pld	W	D	L	GF	GA	GD	Pts
11	Swansea City	46	17	10	19	51	56	−5	61
12	Sheffield Wednesday	46	15	13	18	60	69	−9	58
13	Norwich City	46	14	15	17	71	68	+3	57
14	Watford	46	16	9	21	53	61	−8	57
15	Queens Park Rangers	46	14	14	18	53	63	−10	56

Source: English Football League
Rules for classification: 1) Points; 2) Goal difference; 3) Number of goals scored; 4) Head-to-head results; 5) Wins; 6) Away goals; 7) Penalty points (sec 9.5); 8) Number of 12-point sending off offences; 9) Play-off (only if needed to determine promotion/relegation)

==== Results summary ====
Overall								Home						Away					
Pld	W	D	L	GF	GA	GD	Pts	W	D	L	GF	GA	GD	W	D	L	GF	GA	GD
46	14	15	17	71	68	+3	57	10	8	5	52	34	+18	4	7	12	19	34	−15

Source: Soccerway

==== Results by round ====
Round	1	2	3	4	5	6	7	8	9	10	11	12	13	14	15	16	17	18	19	20	21	22	23	24	25	26	27	28	29	30	31	32	33	34	35	36	37	38	39	40	41	42	43	44	45	46
Ground	A	H	H	A	A	H	A	H	H	A	A	H	A	A	H	A	H	H	A	A	H	A	H	H	A	H	A	A	H	A	H	H	A	H	A	H	H	A	H	A	H	A	H	A	A	H
Result	L	D	D	W	L	W	W	D	W	D	D	D	L	L	L	D	W	W	L	D	L	L	W	D	W	W	L	L	W	W	D	L	D	W	D	D	L	L	W	L	D	L	L	L	D	W
Position	21	19	20	13	15	11	10	10	7	7	7	8	10	12	14	13	10	9	10	10	12	13	12	12	11	11	11	12	11	8	8	11	12	10	11	10	12	13	10	11	11	13	13	14	14	13
Points	0	1	2	5	5	8	11	12	15	16	17	18	18	18	18	19	22	25	25	26	26	26	29	30	33	36	36	36	39	42	43	43	44	47	48	49	49	49	52	52	53	53	53	53	54	57

Source: Soccerway
A = Away; H = Home; W = Win; D = Draw; L = Loss

==== Matches ====
On 26 June, the Championship fixtures were announced.

Win Draw Loss Fixtures

10 August 2024 1	Oxford United	2–0	Norwich City	Littlemore
12:30 BST	Harris 28'; Brannagan 58'; Rodrigues (yellow card) 74'	Report	Sargent (yellow card) 45+1'; Amankwah (yellow card) 55'; Sørensen (yellow card) 87'	Stadium: Kassam Stadium; Attendance: 11,333; Referee: Andrew Kitchen

17 August 2024 2	Norwich City	2–2	Blackburn Rovers	Norwich
15:00 BST	Stacey (yellow card) 27'; Doyle (yellow card) 45+1'; Sargent 65'; Sainz 73'	Report	Hedges 20'; Travis (yellow card) 45+3'; Dolan (yellow card) 68'; Amankwah (yellow card) 78'; Carter 87'	Stadium: Carrow Road; Attendance: 26,400; Referee: James Bell

24 August 2024 3	Norwich City	1–1	Sheffield United	Norwich
15:00 BST	Sargent 22'; Duffy (yellow card) 28'; Amankwah (yellow card) 30'; Núñez (yellow card) 50'; Stacey (yellow card) 52'; McLean (yellow card) 74'	Report	Arblaster 32'; Vinícius (yellow card) 41'; Brooks (yellow card) 67'	Stadium: Carrow Road; Attendance: 26,373; Referee: Josh Smith

31 August 2024 4	Coventry City	0–1	Norwich City	Coventry
12:30 BST	Latibeaudiere (yellow card) 45+2'; Binks (yellow card) 64'; Bassette (yellow card) 70'; Eccles (yellow card) 82'	Report	Sainz 49' (yellow card) 64'; Ben Slimane (yellow card) 90+2'; Gunn (yellow card) 90+3'	Stadium: Coventry Building Society Arena; Attendance: 27,353; Referee: Andy Davies
Note: Fixture was initially scheduled for a 15:00 kick-off but was moved for live Sky Sports broadcast.

14 September 2024 5	Swansea City	1–0	Norwich City	Landore
15:00 BST	Amankwah 4' (o.g.); Darling (yellow card) 53'; Key (yellow card) 88'	Report	Núñez (yellow card) 45+1'; McLean (yellow card) 48'; Duffy (yellow card) 67'	Stadium: Swansea.com Stadium; Attendance: 14,097; Referee: John Busby

21 September 2024 6	Norwich City	4–1	Watford	Norwich
12:30 BST	Doyle 3'; Sainz 45+3'; Núñez 54'; Fisher (yellow card) 89'; Chrisene 89', (yellow card) 90+1'	Report	Andrews 26'; Jebbison (yellow card) 36'	Stadium: Carrow Road; Attendance: 26,438; Referee: Anthony Backhouse
Note: Fixture was initially scheduled for a 15:00 kick-off but was moved for live Sky Sports broadcast.

28 September 2024 7	Derby County	2–3	Norwich City	Derby
12:30 BST	Forsyth (yellow card) 21', (goal) 60'; Chirewa (yellow card) 77'; Goudmijn (yellow card) 79'; Blackett-Taylor 90+1'	Report	Duffy (yellow card) 24'; Sainz 45+3', 65', 87'; Córdoba (yellow card) 90+5'	Stadium: Pride Park Stadium; Attendance: 28,915; Referee: Oliver Langford
Note: Fixture was initially scheduled for a 15:00 kick-off but was moved for live Sky Sports broadcast.

1 October 2024 8	Norwich City	1–1	Leeds United	Norwich
19:45 BST	Sargent 15' (pen.), (yellow card) 30'; Doyle (yellow card) 38'	Report	Struijk (yellow card) 8'; Rothwell (yellow card) 22'; Bogle (yellow card) 47'; Ramazani 60'; Gnonto (yellow card) 66'	Stadium: Carrow Road; Attendance: 26,261; Referee: Stephen Martin
Note: Fixture was initially scheduled for 2 October but was moved forward 24 hours.

5 October 2024 9	Norwich City	4–0	Hull City	Norwich
12:30 BST	Núñez 16'; Sargent 20'; Gordon 66', (yellow card) 90+4'; Schwartau (yellow card) 77'; Sainz 78'; McLean (yellow card) 90+5'	Report	Belloumi (yellow card) 14'; Drameh (yellow card) 57'; João Pedro (yellow card) 76'; Coyle (yellow card) 90'	Stadium: Carrow Road; Attendance: 26,326; Referee: Tom Nield
Note: Fixture was initially scheduled for a 15:00 kick-off but was moved for live Sky Sports broadcast.

19 October 2024 10	Stoke City	1–1	Norwich City	Stoke on Trent
15:00 BST	Manhoef 45+6'	Report	Crnac 45'; Doyle (yellow card) 45+8'	Stadium: Bet365 Stadium; Attendance: 23,002; Referee: Anthony Backhouse

22 October 2024 11	Preston North End	2–2	Norwich City	Preston
19:45 BST	Greenwood 6' (pen.); Holmes 12'; Whiteman (yellow card) 30'; Storey (yellow card) 36'	Report	Doyle (yellow card) 27'; McLean (yellow card) 32'; Sainz 45+2'; Duffy 61'; Marcondes (yellow card) 64'	Stadium: Deepdale; Attendance: 13,677; Referee: Will Finnie

27 October 2024 12	Norwich City	3–3	Middlesbrough	Norwich
15:00 GMT	Sainz 8', 71'; Ben Slimane (yellow card) 58'; Fisher (yellow card) 74'; Dieng 80' (o.g.); McLean (red card) 87'	Report	Conway 13', 40'; Morris (yellow card) 23'; Edmundson (yellow card) 25'; Azaz 45+2'; McGree (yellow card) 70'	Stadium: Carrow Road; Attendance: 26,487; Referee: James Bell
Note: Fixture was initially scheduled for 26 October, but was moved for live Sky Sports broadcast.

2 November 2024 13	Cardiff City	2–1	Norwich City	Leckwith
15:00 GMT	Rinomhota (yellow card) 45+1'; Turnbull (yellow card) 54'; Turnbull (yellow card) 78', (goal) 90+3'; Robinson 89'	Report	Fisher (yellow card) 42'; Sainz 52'; Córdoba (yellow card) 82'	Stadium: Cardiff City Stadium; Referee: Lewis Smith

5 November 2024 14	Sheffield Wednesday	2–0	Norwich City	Owlerton
19:45 GMT	Windass 12'; Iorfa 34'	Report		Stadium: Hillsborough Stadium; Attendance: 22,731; Referee: Stephen Martin

9 November 2024 15	Norwich City	0–2	Bristol City	Norwich
15:00 GMT	Fisher (yellow card) 36'; Sainz (yellow card) 69'	Report	Mehmeti 16'; Wells 63'	Stadium: Carrow Road; Attendance: 26,423; Referee: Farai Hallam

23 November 2024 16	West Bromwich Albion	2–2	Norwich City	West Bromwich
15:00 GMT	Holgate 11'; Furlong (yellow card) 39'; Maja 43'	Report	Marcondes 20'; Heggem 41' (o.g.); Ben Slimane (yellow card) 51'; Fisher (yellow card) 66'	Stadium: The Hawthorns; Attendance: 25,673; Referee: Lewis Smith

26 November 2024 17	Norwich City	6–1	Plymouth Argyle	Norwich
19:45 GMT	Sainz 2', 17', 72'; Duffy 51'; Ben Slimane 80'; Crnac 82'	Report	Sorinola (yellow card) 38'; Bundu 39'	Stadium: Carrow Road; Attendance: 25,893; Referee: Sunny Singh Gill

30 November 2024 18	Norwich City	4–2	Luton Town	Norwich
15:00 GMT	Crnac 25', 33'; Hernández (yellow card) 63'; Marcondes 81'; Sainz 86'	Report	Adebayo 20'; Brown 48'; McGuinness (yellow card) 71'; Woodrow (yellow card) 74'	Stadium: Carrow Road; Attendance: 26,719; Referee: Josh Smith

7 December 2024 19	Queens Park Rangers	3–0	Norwich City	Shepherd's Bush
15:00 GMT	Dunne 22', (yellow card) 52'; Morrison (yellow card) 39'; Nardi (yellow card) 43'; Kolli 45+4', 49'; Smyth (yellow card) 64'; Ashby (yellow card) 84'	Report	Marcondes (yellow card) 54'; Sainz (yellow card) 66'	Stadium: Loftus Road; Attendance: 15,688; Referee: Anthony Backhouse

10 December 2024 20	Portsmouth	0–0	Norwich City	Milton
15:00 GMT	Potts (yellow card) 35'; Poole (yellow card) 38'; Moxon (yellow card) 88'	Report	Barnes (yellow card) 19'; Sørensen (yellow card) 30'; Stacey (yellow card) 41'; Duffy (yellow card) 45'; Núñez (yellow card) 60'	Stadium: Fratton Park; Attendance: 20,151; Referee: Andrew Kitchen

15 December 2024 21	Norwich City	1–2	Burnley	Norwich
15:00 GMT	Córdoba 2'; Doyle (yellow card) 46'; Crnac (yellow card) 53'; Sainz (yellow card) 87'	Report	Flemming 68'; Brownhill 76'; Trafford (yellow card) 87'	Stadium: Carrow Road; Attendance: 26,218; Referee: Andrew Madley
Note: Fixture was initially scheduled for 14 November but was moved for live Sky Sports broadcast.

21 December 2024 22	Sunderland	2–1	Norwich City	Sunderland
15:00 GMT	O'Nien (yellow card) 39'; Isidor (yellow card) 42'; Ballard 47', (yellow card) 68'; Mepham (yellow card) 49'; Cirkin (yellow card) 57'; Bellingham 72'	Report	Ben Slimane 21', (yellow card) 56'; Córdoba (yellow card) 42' (yellow-red card) 70'; Doyle (yellow card) 53'; Núñez (yellow card) 60'	Stadium: Stadium of Light; Attendance: 40,114; Referee: Leigh Doughty

26 December 2024 23	Norwich City	2–1	Millwall	Norwich
15:00 GMT	Marcondes 4'; Schwartau 39', (yellow card) 82'; Ben Slimane (yellow card) 62'	Report	Leoanrd (yellow card) 52'; Esse 65'	Stadium: Carrow Road; Attendance: 26,060; Referee: Tom Nield

29 December 2024 24	Norwich City	1–1	Queens Park Rangers	Norwich
12:30 GMT	Chrisene (yellow card) 38'; Núñez 89'	Report	Field (yellow card) 41'; Crnac 45+4' (o.g.); Ashby (yellow card) 62'; Morgan (yellow card) 68'; Frey (yellow card) 79'	Stadium: Carrow Road; Attendance: 26,563; Referee: Sam Barrott
Note: Fixture was initially scheduled for 28 December, but was moved for live Sky Sports broadcast.

1 January 2025 25	Luton Town	0–1	Norwich City	Luton
15:00 GMT	Nelson (yellow card) 38'	Report	Núñez 73'; Doyle (yellow card) 89'	Stadium: Kenilworth Road; Attendance: 11,828; Referee: Jarred Gillett

4 January 2025 26	Norwich City	2–1	Coventry City	Norwich
15:00 GMT	Amankwah 90+1', 90+5'; Marcondes (yellow card) 90+5'	Report	van Ewijk 24'; Sheaf (yellow card) 34'; Eccles (yellow card) 68'	Stadium: Carrow Road; Attendance: 26,682; Referee: James Bell

18 January 2025 27	Sheffield United	2–0	Norwich City	Sheffield
15:00 GMT	Burrows 22', 59' (pen.); Gilchrist (yellow card) 50'	Report	Marcondes (yellow card) 59'; Doyle (yellow card) 88'	Stadium: Bramall Lane; Attendance: 28,239; Referee: Josh Smith

22 January 2025 28	Leeds United	2–0	Norwich City	Leeds
19:45 GMT	Solomon 1'; Tanaka (yellow card) 8'; Byram (yellow card) 13'; James 65'; Rothwell (yellow card) 71'; Piroe (yellow card) 85'	Report	Fisher (yellow card) 4'; Dobbin (yellow card) 81'	Stadium: Elland Road; Attendance: 35,157; Referee: Matt Donohue

25 January 2025 29	Norwich City	5–1	Swansea City	Norwich
12:30 GMT	Sargent 44', 63'; Schwartau (yellow card) 53'; Marcondes (yellow card) 61', (goal) 86'; Dobbin 76'; Crnac 84'	Report	Cullen 62'; Fulton (yellow card) 90+4'	Stadium: Carrow Road; Attendance: 25,713; Referee: Thomas Bramall
Note: Fixture was initially scheduled for a 15:00 kick-off, but was moved for live Sky Sports broadcasting.

1 February 2025 30	Watford	0–1	Norwich City	Watford
12:30 GMT	Bayo (red card) 35'; Louza (yellow card) 40'; Andrews (yellow card) 77'; Sissoko (yellow card) 89'	Report	Sargent 41'	Stadium: Vicarage Road; Attendance: 19,774; Referee: Lewis Smith
Note: Fixture was initially scheduled for a 15:00 kick-off, but was moved for live Sky Sports broadcasting.

8 February 2025 31	Norwich City	1–1	Derby County	Norwich
15:00 GMT	Fisher (yellow card) 29'; Sargent 68'; Doyle (yellow card) 90+3'	Report	Adams (yellow card) 27'; Phillips (yellow card) 59'; Yates 90+2' (pen.)	Stadium: Carrow Road; Attendance: 26,584; Referee: Ruebyn Ricardo

11 February 2025 32	Norwich City	0–1	Preston North End	Norwich
20:00 GMT	Crnac (yellow card) 65'; Sainz (yellow card) 90+5'	Report	Osmajić 5'; Ledson (yellow card) 64'; Woodman (yellow card) 80'; Hughes (yellow card) 89'	Stadium: Carrow Road; Attendance: 25,910; Referee: Gavin Ward
Note: Fixture was initially scheduled for a 19:45 kick-off, but was moved for live Sky Sports broadcasting.

15 February 2025 33	Hull City	1–1	Norwich City	Kingston upon Hull
15:00 GMT	Crooks 14'; McLoughlin (yellow card) 81'	Report	Sargent 47'; Doyle (yellow card) 56'; Wright (yellow card) 78'	Stadium: MKM Stadium; Attendance: 22,141; Referee: Ben Toner

22 February 2025 34	Norwich City	4–2	Stoke City	Norwich
15:00 GMT	Dobbin 32'; Sargent 48', 71'; Tchamadeu 78' (o.g.)	Report	Tchamadeu (yellow card) 20'; Baker 45+2', 90+7' (pen.)	Stadium: Carrow Road; Attendance: 26,267; Referee: John Busby

1 March 2025 35	Blackburn Rovers	1–1	Norwich City	Blackburn
12:30 GMT	Dennis (yellow card) 67' (yellow-red card) 85'; Weimann 90+6'	Report	Fisher (yellow card) 22'; Crnac 90'	Stadium: Ewood Park; Attendance: 14,240; Referee: Leigh Doughty
Note: Fixture was initially scheduled for a 15:00 kick-off, but was moved for live Sky Sports broadcasting.

7 March 2025 36	Norwich City	1–1	Oxford United	Norwich
20:00 GMT	Sargent 5'	Report	Harris 18'; Moore (yellow card) 69'; Brown (yellow card) 72'	Stadium: Carrow Road; Attendance: 25,996; Referee: James Bell
Note: Fixture was initially scheduled for 8 March, but was moved for live Sky Sports broadcasting.

11 March 2025 37	Norwich City	2–3	Sheffield Wednesday	Norwich
19:45 GMT	Sainz 16'; Crnac 35'	Report	Valentín (yellow card) 29'; Ihiekwe (yellow card) 42', (goal) 64'; Chalobah (yellow card) 57'; Windass 72', (yellow card) 78'; Gassama 76'	Stadium: Carrow Road; Attendance: 25,498; Referee: Ben Speedie
Note: Fixture was initially scheduled for 12 March, but was moved due to the Bristol City fixture being rescheduled to the Friday.

14 March 2025 38	Bristol City	2–1	Norwich City	Ashton Gate
20:00 GMT	Sykes 6'; Wells 23'; Knight (yellow card) 34'; Williams (yellow card) 36'; O'Leary (yellow card) 90+2'; Dickie (yellow card) 90+3'	Report	Fisher (yellow card) 44'; Sainz 82'	Stadium: Ashton Gate; Referee: Sam Allison
Note: Fixture was initially scheduled for 15 March, but was moved for live Sky Sports broadcasting.

29 March 2025 39	Norwich City	1–0	West Bromwich Albion	Norwich
15:00 GMT	Sargent 90+2', (yellow card) 90+3'	Report		Stadium: Carrow Road; Attendance: 26,707; Referee: David Webb

5 April 2025 40	Plymouth Argyle	2–1	Norwich City	Plymouth
15:00 BST	Hardie 24', 29'	Report	Sargent 46'	Stadium: Home Park; Referee: Gavin Ward

8 April 2025 41	Norwich City	0–0	Sunderland	Norwich
19:45 BST	Fisher (yellow card) 50'; McLean (yellow card) 53'	Report	O'Nien (yellow card) 26'; Watson (yellow card) 32'; Hjelde (yellow card) 57'; Jones (yellow card) 86'	Stadium: Carrow Road; Attendance: 26,320; Referee: Jeremy Simpson

11 April 2025 42	Burnley	2–1	Norwich City	Burnley
20:00 BST	Mejbri 14'; Anthony 24'; Cullen (yellow card) 35'; Edwards (yellow card) 68'	Report	Sainz (yellow card) 60'; Ben Slimane (yellow card) 66'; Stacey 76'	Stadium: Turf Moor; Attendance: 19,030; Referee: Tony Harrington
Note: Fixture was initially scheduled for 12 April, but was moved for live Sky Sports broadcasting.

18 April 2025 43	Norwich City	3–5	Portsmouth	Norwich
15:00 BST	Sargent 21'; Stacey 64'; Sainz (yellow card) 79'; Marcondes 90'	Report	Bishop 15', 45+4' (pen.), 51'; Ritchie (yellow card) 31', (goal) 39'; Hayden (yellow card) 32'; Poole 71'; Dozzell (yellow card) 90+5'	Stadium: Carrow Road; Attendance: 26,838; Referee: Thomas Kirk

21 April 2025 44	Millwall	3–1	Norwich City	Bermondsey
15:00 BST	Ivanović 8', 69'; Azeez 39'; Cundle (yellow card) 71'	Report	Duffy 45+4'; Núñez (yellow card) 61'; McLean (yellow card) 79'; Hernández (yellow card) 89'	Stadium: The Den; Attendance: 16,426; Referee: Elliott Bell

26 April 2025 45	Middlesbrough	0–0	Norwich City	Middlesbrough
15:00 BST	Iling-Junior (yellow card) 43'	Report	Stacey (yellow card) 45'; Sainz (yellow card) 90+3'	Stadium: Riverside Stadium; Attendance: 26,374; Referee: Dean Whitestone

3 May 2025 46	Norwich City	4–2	Cardiff City	Norwich
12:30 BST	Núñez 13', 17'; Sainz 23'; Wright (yellow card) 36'; Stacey (yellow card) 42'; Duffy 67'; Doyle (yellow card) 73'	Report	Ralls (yellow card) 10'; Chambers (red card) 16'; Salech 56' (pen.), 84'; Bagan (yellow card) 64'	Stadium: Carrow Road; Attendance: 26,581; Referee: Will Finnie
Note: Fixture was initially scheduled for a 15:00 kick-off, but all EFL Championship final matchday fixtures were moved to an earlier kick-off.

=== FA Cup ===
Norwich City entered the FA Cup at the third round stage, and were drawn at home to Brighton & Hove Albion.

Win Draw Loss Fixtures

11 January 2025 Third round	Norwich City	0–4	Brighton & Hove Albion	Norwich
15:00 GMT		Report	Rutter 37', 45+2'; Enciso 59'; March 74'	Stadium: Carrow Road; Attendance: 24,738; Referee: Simon Hooper

=== EFL Cup ===
On 27 June, the draw for the first round was made, with Norwich being drawn at home against Stevenage. In the second round, they were drawn away to Crystal Palace.

Win Draw Loss Fixtures

13 August 2024 First round	Norwich City	4–3	Stevenage	Norwich
19:45 BST	Long (yellow card) 25'; Kamara 26'; Hernández 35', 60'; Sainz 48'; Forsyth (yellow card) 75'	Report	White (yellow card) 18'; Goode 28'; Appéré 45+1'; Hills 88' (o.g.)	Stadium: Carrow Road; Attendance: 13,054; Referee: Sunny Singh Gill

27 August 2024 Second round	Crystal Palace	4–0	Norwich City	Selhurst
20:00 BST	Kamada 2'; Mateta 57', 68'; Muñoz (yellow card) 76'; Eze 84'; Lerma (yellow card) 88'	Report		Stadium: Selhurst Park; Attendance: 12,503; Referee: Matt Donohue

== Squad statistics ==
=== Appearances and goals ===
Italics indicate a loaned in player

No.	Pos	Nat	Player	Total		Championship		FA Cup		EFL Cup	
No.	Pos	Nat	Player	Apps	Goals	Apps	Goals	Apps	Goals	Apps	Goals
1	GK	(Scotland)	Angus Gunn	35	0	35	0	0	0	0	0
3	DF	(England)	Jack Stacey	43	2	20+20	2	1	0	1+1	0
4	DF	(Republic of Ireland)	Shane Duffy	47	4	45	4	0+1	0	0+1	0
6	DF	(England)	Callum Doyle	43	1	38+2	1	1	0	0+2	0
7	FW	(Spain)	Borja Sainz	43	19	41	18	0	0	1+1	1
8	MF	(England)	Liam Gibbs	11	0	1+8	0	0	0	1+1	0
9	FW	(United States)	Josh Sargent	33	15	28+4	15	0+1	0	0	0
10	FW	(Czech Republic)	Matěj Jurásek	2	0	1+1	0	0	0	0	0
11	MF	(Denmark)	Emiliano Marcondes	33	5	25+8	5	0	0	0	0
12	GK	(England)	George Long	12	0	8+1	0	1	0	2	0
14	DF	(England)	Ben Chrisene	27	1	12+13	1	1	0	1	0
15	DF	(Northern Ireland)	Ruairi McConville	7	0	2+5	0	0	0	0	0
16	MF	(England)	Jacob Wright	14	0	10+4	0	0	0	0	0
17	FW	(Croatia)	Ante Crnac	40	7	29+9	7	1	0	1	0
18	MF	(Ghana)	Forson Amankwah	24	2	8+13	2	1	0	2	0
19	MF	(Denmark)	Jacob Sørensen	27	0	14+13	0	0	0	0	0
20	MF	(Tunisia)	Anis Ben Slimane	33	2	25+8	2	0	0	0	0
22	FW	(England)	Lewis Dobbin	11	2	8+2	2	1	0	0	0
23	MF	(Scotland)	Kenny McLean	37	0	33+1	0	1	0	1+1	0
25	MF	(Cuba)	Onel Hernández	24	2	5+16	0	0+1	0	2	2
26	MF	(Chile)	Marcelino Núñez	36	6	28+5	6	1	0	2	0
29	MF	(Denmark)	Oscar Schwartau	42	1	17+23	1	1	0	0+1	0
33	DF	(Panama)	José Córdoba	36	1	24+10	1	1	0	1	0
35	DF	(England)	Kellen Fisher	40	0	33+4	0	0+1	0	2	0
36	GK	(Chile)	Vicente Reyes	4	0	3+1	0	0	0	0	0
38	GK	(Wales)	Daniel Barden	0	0	0	0	0	0	0	0
41	MF	(Scotland)	Gabriel Forsyth	7	0	2+3	0	0	0	1+1	0
43	MF	(England)	Uriah Djedje	0	0	0	0	0	0	0	0
44	MF	(Wales)	Elliot Myles	4	0	0+3	0	0	0	0+1	0
47	DF	(England)	Lucien Mahovo	8	0	6+2	0	0	0	0	0
49	MF	(England)	AJ Bridge	0	0	0	0	0	0	0	0
50	FW	(England)	Errol Mundle-Smith	0	0	0	0	0	0	0	0
51	FW	(England)	Dylan Jones	0	0	0	0	0	0	0	0
Player(s) who featured whilst on loan but returned to parent club during the season:
21	FW	(England)	Kaide Gordon	10	1	1+9	1	0	0	0	0
Player(s) who featured but departed the club on loan during the season:
40	DF	(England)	Brad Hills	5	0	0+3	0	0+1	0	1	0
46	FW	(England)	Ken Aboh	0	0	0	0	0	0	0	0
Player(s) who featured but departed the club permanently during the season:
5	DF	(Scotland)	Grant Hanley	4	0	1+2	0	0	0	1	0
10	FW	(England)	Ashley Barnes	8	0	1+7	0	0	0	0	0
11	FW	(Republic of Ireland)	Adam Idah	1	0	0+1	0	0	0	0	0
16	MF	(Switzerland)	Christian Fassnacht	3	0	1+2	0	0	0	0	0
47	MF	(England)	Abu Kamara	3	1	0+2	0	0	0	1	1
50	DF	(England)	Jaden Warner	1	0	0	0	0	0	1	0

=== Goalscorers ===
Rnk	No	Pos	Nat	Name	Championship	FA Cup	EFL Cup	Total
1	7	FW	(Spain)	Borja Sainz	18	0	1	19
2	9	FW	(United States)	Josh Sargent	15	0	0	15
3	17	FW	(Croatia)	Ante Crnac	7	0	0	7
4	26	MF	(Chile)	Marcelino Núñez	6	0	0	6
5	11	MF	(Denmark)	Emiliano Marcondes	5	0	0	5
6	4	DF	(Republic of Ireland)	Shane Duffy	4	0	0	4
7	20	MF	(Tunisia)	Anis Ben Slimane	2	0	0	2
7	18	MF	(Ghana)	Forson Amankwah	2	0	0	2
7	22	FW	(England)	Lewis Dobbin	2	0	0	2
7	3	DF	(England)	Jack Stacey	2	0	0	2
7	25	MF	(Cuba)	Onel Hernández	0	0	2	2
12	6	DF	(England)	Callum Doyle	1	0	0	1
12	14	DF	(England)	Ben Chrisene	1	0	0	1
12	21	FW	(England)	Kaide Gordon	1	0	0	1
12	33	DF	(Panama)	José Córdoba	1	0	0	1
12	29	MF	(Denmark)	Oscar Schwartau	1	0	0	1
12	47	MF	(England)	Abu Kamara	0	0	1	1
Own goals					3	0	0	3
Total					71	0	4	75
