= Josh Sargent =

American soccer player (born 2000)

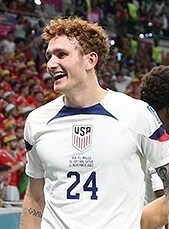
- Sargent with the United States at the 2022 FIFA World Cup

Personal information
- Full name: Joshua Thomas Sargent
- Date of birth: February 20, 2000 (age 26)
- Place of birth: O'Fallon, Missouri, U.S.
- Height: 6 ft 1 in (1.85 m)
- Position: Forward

Team information
- Current team: Toronto FC
- Number: 9

Youth career
- 2008–2016: St. Louis Scott Gallagher
- 2016–2017: IMG Academy
- 2017–2018: Werder Bremen

Senior career*
Years	Team	Apps	(Gls)
2018	Werder Bremen II	12	(7)
2018–2021	Werder Bremen	72	(13)
2021–2026	Norwich City	147	(53)
2026–	Toronto FC	27	(10)

International career^{‡}
2015–2017	United States U17	48	(30)
2017	United States U20	6	(4)
2019	United States U23	2	(0)
2018–	United States	29	(5)
Medal record
Representing United States
Men's soccer
CONCACAF Under-17 Championship
Runner-up	2017 Panama
CONCACAF Nations League
Winner	2021 United States
- * Club domestic league appearances and goals as of November 7, 2026 (UTC) ‡ National team caps and goals as of September 6, 2025 (UTC)

Joshua Thomas Sargent (born February 20, 2000) is an American professional soccer player who plays as a forward for Major League Soccer club Toronto FC and the United States national team.

In May 2017, at age 17, Sargent became the youngest U.S. player to score at the FIFA U-20 World Cup. In 2018, he debuted for the senior United States national team, and was eventually selected to the squads for the 2022 FIFA World Cup and the 2024 Copa América.

== Early life ==
Sargent was born in O'Fallon, Missouri, to Jeff and Liane Sargent, both of whom played college-level soccer. Sargent joined the Scott Gallagher Soccer Club at eight years old. He attended St. Dominic for part of his high school years before moving to Florida to join the U.S. residency program. He was ranked as the No. 2 high school soccer player in the country.

== Club career ==
=== Early career ===
Sargent played for Scott Gallagher Missouri, a U.S. Soccer Development Academy club from St. Louis, Missouri. After his impressive performance at the 2016 Nike International Friendlies, he spent two weeks training with Sporting Kansas City in the summer of 2016 and the MLS club acquired the player's acquisition rights, as St. Louis was previously in Sporting Kansas City's homegrown player territory. In October of the same year, Sargent spent a week-long training spell with Dutch club PSV Eindhoven. In January 2017, after being called for the United States U20 team, he trained with German club FC Schalke 04.

=== Werder Bremen ===
On September 20, 2017, Werder Bremen announced that Sargent would join the club on January 1, 2018, and then sign a professional contract on his 18th birthday, per FIFA rules. He played with the club's under-23 squad in a friendly match and signed his contract on February 20, 2018, making him eligible to join the first team for the 2018–19 season.

On December 7, 2018, Sargent made his debut for the Werder Bremen first team, coming on as a substitute in the 76th minute in a match against Fortuna Düsseldorf. He scored with his first touch of the match in the 78th minute, the fastest goal by a debutant in club history.

In February 2019, Sargent agreed to a "long-term" contract extension with the club.

=== Norwich City ===
==== 2021–22 season ====
On August 9, 2021, Sargent left Werder Bremen to join Premier League club Norwich City on a four-year deal for an undisclosed fee, reported as in the region of €9.5 million. Five days later, he made his debut in a 3–0 home defeat against Liverpool after coming on as a substitute at 77th minute in place of his former Werder Bremen teammate Milot Rashica. He scored his first two goals for the club on August 24, in an emphatic 6–0 victory over Bournemouth in the second round of the EFL Cup.

On January 21, 2022, Sargent scored his first league goals of the season, one of them a scorpion-kick, in a 3–0 win over fellow Premier League relegation battlers Watford.

==== 2022–23 season ====
Sargent remained at Norwich following their relegation. Sargent scored his first goal of the season in Norwich's first league win of the season against Huddersfield Town. Three days later, he notched a brace in a 2–0 win against Millwall. Sargent continued his goal-scoring form, netting the winner for Norwich away to Sunderland, before netting in back-to-back games for the second time of the season in victories against Coventry City and Bristol City respectively. He scored in back-to-back games again, this time in defeats at home against Preston North End, and away to Watford. He scored again in a 2–1 home defeat against Middlesbrough, in Norwich's final match before the 2022 FIFA World Cup.

After returning from the World Cup, Sargent's goal scoring form declined, however he still scored in Norwich's 4–2 away win against Coventry, and again two weeks later in a 3–1 home win over Hull City. However, Sargent suffered an ankle injury in a 0–0 draw away to Wigan Athletic, and missed the next three games.

==== 2024–25 season ====
At the EFL awards for the 2024‍–‍25 season, Sargent was named in the EFL team of the season. He was also voted by Norwich City supporters as the club's player of the season for 2024–25, after scoring fifteen league goals.

==== 2025–26 season ====
Following an impressive start to the 2025–26 season, Sargent was named EFL Championship Player of the Month for August 2025 after scoring five goals in four matches.

On 11 January 2026, Norwich City manager Philippe Clement stated that Sargent had messaged him to make himself unavailable for the third round FA Cup tie against Walsall, following a reported bid from Toronto FC. Sargent was subsequently omitted from matchday squads and made to train with Norwich City's under-21 side following the incident.

=== Toronto FC ===
On 27 February 2026, Sargent's move to Toronto FC was completed. The transfer fee agreed with Norwich City was reported as an initial £15.5 million and more than £20 million with add-ons, a potential record surpassing Son Heung-min's £20-plus million transfer to Los Angeles FC.

== International career ==
=== Youth ===
Sargent first appeared in a United States under-14 camp in 2013. In the same year, he was called up to the United States under-15 team.

In 2015, he joined the Under-17 MNT Residency Program in Bradenton, Florida. He was a key part of the team that won the 2016 Nike International Friendlies, scoring four goals and notching two assists in three matches.

On April 17, 2017, Sargent was included by coach John Hackworth in the 20-man squad chosen to represent United States at the 2017 CONCACAF U-17 Championship. He scored five goals in the tournament, including two goals in a victory over Mexico. He led the United States as they reached the final and qualified for the 2017 FIFA U-17 World Cup. Only two days later, Sargent was surprisingly included by coach Tab Ramos in the 21-man squad called to represent United States at the 2017 FIFA U-20 World Cup. On May 22, the Americans debuted in the tournament against Ecuador. Sargent started the match and scored two goals, helping his team to tie the match 3–3, and becoming the youngest American player to ever score at the under-20 World Cup. Sargent is the second American player, after Freddy Adu, to play in both the under-17 and under-20 World Cups in the same year. On June 1, after scoring against New Zealand, Sargent joined Jozy Altidore, Eddie Johnson and Taylor Twellman, becoming one of the United States's all-time leading goalscorers at the under-20 World Cup.

=== Senior ===
On November 7, 2017, Sargent received his first senior call up for a friendly against Portugal. He thus became the only American player ever to appear in an under-17, under-20, and senior camp in the same calendar year. On May 28, 2018, Sargent earned his first cap for the senior team in a friendly against Bolivia and scored his first international goal. He became the fourth-youngest player to score for the United States, until Timothy Weah, two days younger than Sargent, scored his first goal minutes later.

On November 9, 2022, Sargent was named in the United States 26-man squad for the 2022 FIFA World Cup. He would play in all 3 of the United States' group matches, starting the games against Wales and Iran. Sargent hit the post with a header early in the match against Wales. He was substituted after picking up an ankle injury against Iran, ruling him out of the United States' round of 16 clash against the Netherlands.

== Personal life ==
Sargent is married to his high school sweetheart, Kirsten, with whom he has three children.

== Career statistics ==
=== Club ===
As of match played November 7, 2026

Appearances and goals by club, season and competition
Club	Season	League			National cup (Note: Includes DFB-Pokal, FA Cup)		League cup (Note: Includes EFL Cup)		Other		Total	
Club	Season	Division	Apps	Goals	Apps	Goals	Apps	Goals	Apps	Goals	Apps	Goals
Werder Bremen II	2018–19	Regionalliga Nord	12	7	—		—		—		12	7
Werder Bremen	2018–19	Bundesliga	10	2	0	0	—		—		10	2
Werder Bremen	2019–20	Bundesliga	28	4	4	0	—		2 (Note: Appearances in Bundesliga relegation play-offs)	0	34	4
Werder Bremen	2020–21	Bundesliga	32	5	5	2	—		—		37	7
Werder Bremen	2021–22	2. Bundesliga	2	2	0	0	—		—		2	2
Werder Bremen	Total		72	13	9	2	—		2	0	83	15
Norwich City	2021–22	Premier League	26	2	2	0	1	2	—		29	4
Norwich City	2022–23	Championship	40	13	0	0	1	0	—		41	13
Norwich City	2023–24	Championship	26	16	1	0	1	0	2 (Note: Appearances in Championship play-offs)	0	30	16
Norwich City	2024–25	Championship	32	15	1	0	0	0	—		33	15
Norwich City	2025–26	Championship	23	7	0	0	1	1	—		24	8
Norwich City	Total		147	53	4	0	4	3	2	0	157	56
Toronto FC	2026	Major League Soccer	27	10	0	0	—		—		27	10
Career total			258	83	13	2	4	3	4	0	279	88

=== International ===
As of match played September 6, 2025

Appearances and goals by national team and year
National Team	Year	Apps	Goals
United States	2018	6	2
United States	2019	6	3
United States	2020	0	0
United States	2021	7	0
United States	2022	4	0
United States	2023	0	0
United States	2024	4	0
United States	2025	2	0
Total		29	5

Scores and results list United States' goal tally first, score column indicates score after each Sargent goal.

List of international goals scored by Josh Sargent
No.	Date	Venue	Cap	Opponent	Score	Result	Competition
1	May 28, 2018	Talen Energy Stadium, Chester, United States	1	Bolivia	2–0	3–0	Friendly
2	October 16, 2018	Pratt & Whitney Stadium, East Hartford, United States	5	Peru	1–0	1–1	Friendly
3	October 11, 2019	Audi Field, Washington, D.C., United States	10	Cuba	6–0	7–0	2019–20 CONCACAF Nations League A
4	November 19, 2019	Truman Bodden Sports Complex, George Town, Cayman Islands	12	Cuba	1–0	4–0	2019–20 CONCACAF Nations League A
5	November 19, 2019	Truman Bodden Sports Complex, George Town, Cayman Islands	12	Cuba	4–0	4–0	2019–20 CONCACAF Nations League A

== Honors ==
United States U17

- CONCACAF Under-17 Championship runner-up: 2017

United States

- CONCACAF Nations League: 2019–20

Individual

- FIFA U-20 World Cup Silver Boot: 2017
- EFL Championship Team of the Season: 2024–25
- Norwich City Player of the Season: 2024–25
- EFL Championship Player of the Month: August 2025
