= Anis Ben Slimane =

Tunisian footballer (born 2001)

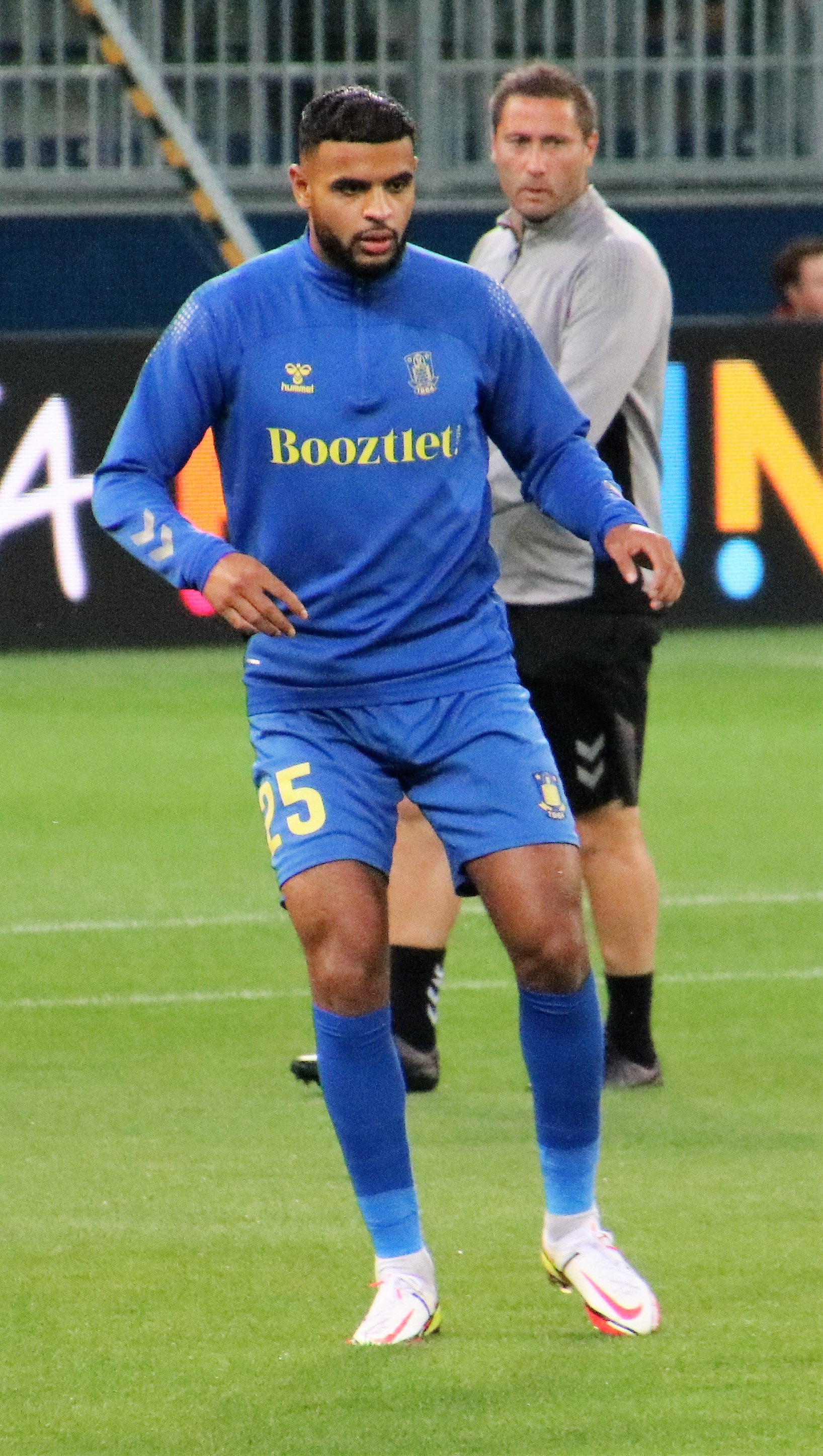
- Ben Slimane with Brøndby in 2021

Personal information
- Full name: Anis Ben Slimane
- Date of birth: 16 March 2001 (age 25)
- Place of birth: Copenhagen, Denmark
- Height: 1.88 m (6 ft 2 in)
- Position: Midfielder

Team information
- Current team: Norwich City
- Number: 20

Youth career
- 2008: BK Vestia
- 2008–2010: KB
- 2010–2011: FA 2000
- 2011: Herfølge
- 2011–2012: B.93
- 2012–2014: Brøndby
- 2014–2015: KB
- 2015: Lyngby
- 2015–2018: AB

Senior career*
Years	Team	Apps	(Gls)
2017–2019	AB	18	(2)
2020–2023	Brøndby	104	(9)
2023–2025	Sheffield United	18	(0)
2024–2025	→ Norwich City (loan)	18	(2)
2025–	Norwich City	41	(5)

International career^{‡}
2019	Denmark U19	9	(2)
2019	Tunisia U20	3	(0)
2020–	Tunisia	48	(5)
- * Club domestic league appearances and goals as of 2 September 2026 (UTC) ‡ National team caps and goals as of 17 November 2026

Anis Ben Slimane (Arabic: أَنِيس بْن سُلَيْمَان; born 16 March 2001) is a professional footballer who plays as a midfielder for EFL Championship club Norwich City. Born in Denmark, he plays for the Tunisia national team.

Ben Slimane had a tumultuous youth career, playing for eight different clubs in twelve years, but finally settled at AB where he made his senior debut in 2018. The following season, he departed for Brøndby and was included in the U19-squad, but in the second half of the 2019–20 season he established himself as part of the first team. At Brøndby, he was part of the Danish Superliga-winning team in 2020–21. After having made more than 100 appearances for the club, he departed for Premier League club Sheffield United in 2023.

Born in Denmark, Ben Slimane has dual citizenship and made appearances for both Denmark U19 and Tunisia U20. He represents Tunisia at senior international level, and played at the FIFA World Cup in 2022 and 2026.

== Club career ==
=== Early career ===
Ben Slimane was born in Copenhagen and lived in the Vesterbro neighbourhood during his youth. He started playing for the lower levels of Vesterbro club BK Vestia at age seven, which was the club located most closely to his home. After a few months he moved to the KB academy due to his classmate playing there; a team his classmate's father also coached. Later, Ben Slimane and his classmate signed with the FA 2000 academy. Because some clubs were hesitant to create first teams and second teams, Slimane moved to different clubs in Copenhagen, who were willing to commit to youth football at a higher level. The following year, him and his classmate moved to Herfølge Boldklub, where they were for a short period, before moving first to B.93, where they reunited with the group of youth players from FA 2000. During his time at B.93, Ben Slimane played in a UEFA European Club Championship tournament, where he impressed and therefore signed with the Brøndby IF academy.

Ben Slimane was twelve years old when he moved to Brøndby. He played for their academy teams for one and a half years before moving back to play for KB at the under-13 level because of excessive travelling time to Brøndby after he and his family had moved to Høje Gladsaxe. Ben Slimane's second stint at KB was unsuccessful, and he began to play for Lyngby Boldklub. He played in Lyngby's youth for six months before being signed by local club Akademisk Boldklub (AB) at under-14 level, where he once again reunited with his old classmates. Ben Slimane stayed at AB for four years, ending his journeyman youth career. There, he played for four years, breaking into the first team during his final time at the club. In an interview with the Brøndby IF website, Ben Slimane described how he was among Denmark's youth football prospects during his first years of playing, but those different circumstances meant that he had to fight for his breakthrough into professional football. During this period, he was close to retiring from football but his family and friends' support helped him through the difficult periods. During one summer, where he played in AB's youth academy, he experienced a large growth spurt in which he grew 15 cm, which enabled him to become more dominant physically and helped him develop as a player.

In January 2018, Ben Slimane left on a one-week trial with German Bundesliga club SC Freiburg. He made his first-team debut for AB on 7 April 2018 in a 2–1 home win over IF Lyseng, coming on as an 80th-minute substitute for Nichlas Rohde. Slimane made a total of 18 league appearances for AB in which he scored two goals.

=== Brøndby ===
==== 2019–20 ====
Ben Slimane joined Brøndby IF at under-19 level in June 2019, after he had impressed for the AB first-team in the Danish 2nd Division, the third tier of the Danish football pyramid. In January 2020, he was selected to participate in Brøndby's first-team training camp in Portugal, where he made his first appearance for the senior side in a pre-season friendly against Swedish side IFK Norrköping.

On 16 February 2020, Ben Slimane made his professional debut in an away match against OB in the Danish Superliga as a starter, which Brøndby won 2–0. The following week, he made his first assist, a cross into the box which Samuel Mráz slotted home in a 3–2 loss to AaB. On 8 March 2020, he scored his first goal for Brøndby in a 2–2 draw away against FC Nordsjælland; a match played behind closed doors at Right to Dream Park due to guidelines implemented by Danish authorities during the COVID-19 pandemic. After the match, Ben Slimane expressed his regret in not being able to celebrate his goal in front of fans.

==== 2020–21: Danish Superliga champions ====
On 3 July 2020, Ben Slimane signed a new contract with Brøndby, keeping him at the club until 2024. After struggling to find his way to the starting lineup during the first half of the 2020–21 season, he scored the winning goal on 13 December against SønderjyskE after coming on as a substitute for Simon Hedlund in the 77th minute.

On 1 February 2021, Ben Slimane was fined and temporarily withdrawn from the Brøndby squad after breaking coronavirus quarantine guidelines. According to him, he picked up a female friend at a party, and the police showed up. He subsequently tested negative for COVID-19 twice and was included in the first team again on 3 February.

On 24 May, Ben Slimane scored Brøndby's second goal in their 2–0 win over Nordsjælland. The result confirmed Brøndby as Danish Superliga champions for the first time in 16 years.

==== 2021–22 ====
Ben Slimane made his European debut on 17 August 2021 in the UEFA Champions League play-off first leg against Red Bull Salzburg, which ended in a 2–1 loss. He scored his first goal of the season on 29 August as Brøndby beat Midtjylland 2–0 – their first win of the season.

=== Sheffield United ===
On 13 July 2023, Ben Slimane signed for recently promoted Premier League club Sheffield United on a three-year contract, taking the number 25 jersey. It was reported that the club had triggered his release clause which saw them pay under £1 million up front, with performance-related add-ons potentially increasing the transfer fee. On 12 August, he made his competitive debut for the Blades in a 1–0 league loss against Crystal Palace. He made 15 league appearances during the season as the club was relegated back to the EFL Championship after one year in the top flight.

Ben Slimane scored his first goal for Sheffield United on 13 August 2024 in an EFL Cup tie against Wrexham.

=== Norwich City ===
On 30 August 2024, Ben Slimane signed with EFL Championship club Norwich City on a season-long loan, with an option to make the move permanent upon the completion of certain criteria. The following day, he made his competitive debut for the Canaries, replacing Forson Amankwah at half-time in a 1–0 league win away over Coventry City. He scored his first goal for the club on 26 November in a 6–1 league victory over Plymouth Argyle.

On 14 January 2025, Norwich City activated a clause in Ben Slimane's loan agreement, making his move from Sheffield United permanent for an undisclosed fee. He signed a long-term contract after contributing two goals in 21 league appearances during his loan spell.

== International career ==
Ben Slimane with Tunisia at the 2021 Africa Cup of Nations.

Ben Slimane has represented the Denmark national under-19 football team, as well as the Tunisia national under-20 football team.

On 1 October 2020, Ben Slimane was called up to Mondher Kebaier's senior Tunisia squad for the two friendlies against Sudan and Nigeria. He scored in his debut, the third goal in a 3–0 win over Sudan.

Ben Slimane was called up to the Tunisia squad for the 2022 World Cup in Qatar on 14 November 2022. On 22 November 2022, he made his debut in a major tournament in Tunisia's opening World Cup game against his country of birth, Denmark, starting in the 0–0 draw at Education City Stadium.

Ben Slimane was called up for the 2026 FIFA World Cup.

== Career statistics ==
=== Club ===
As of match played 8 August 2026

Appearances and goals by club, season and competition
Club	Season	League			National cup (Note: Includes Danish Cup, FA Cup)		League cup (Note: Includes EFL Cup)		Europe		Total	
Club	Season	Division	Apps	Goals	Apps	Goals	Apps	Goals	Apps	Goals	Apps	Goals
AB	2017–18	Danish 2nd Division	2	0	0	0	—		—		2	0
AB	2018–19	Danish 2nd Division	16	2	1	0	—		—		17	2
AB	Total		18	2	1	0	—		—		19	2
Brøndby	2019–20	Danish Superliga	16	1	0	0	—		0	0	16	1
Brøndby	2020–21	Danish Superliga	27	3	2	0	—		—		29	3
Brøndby	2021–22	Danish Superliga	31	2	3	0	—		8 (Note: Two appearances in UEFA Champions League, six appearances in UEFA Europa League)	0	42	2
Brøndby	2022–23	Danish Superliga	30	3	1	0	—		3 (Note: Appearances in UEFA Europa Conference League)	0	34	3
Brøndby	Total		104	9	6	0	—		11	0	121	9
Sheffield United	2023–24	Premier League	15	0	0	0	0	0	—		15	0
Sheffield United	2024–25	Championship	3	0	0	0	1	1	—		4	1
Sheffield United	Total		18	0	0	0	1	1	—		19	1
Norwich City (loan)	2024–25	Championship	18	2	0	0	0	0	—		18	2
Norwich City	2024–25	Championship	15	0	0	0	—		—		15	0
Norwich City	2025–26	Championship	22	5	3	0	1	0	—		26	5
Norwich City	2026–27	Championship	0	0	0	0	1	1	—		1	1
Norwich City	Total		37	5	3	0	2	1	—		42	6
Career total			195	18	10	0	3	2	11	0	219	20

=== International ===
As of match played 17 November 2026

Appearances and goals by national team and year
National team	Year	Apps	Goals
Tunisia	2020	4	1
Tunisia	2021	10	3
Tunisia	2022	12	0
Tunisia	2023	3	0
Tunisia	2024	5	0
Tunisia	2025	4	0
Tunisia	2026	10	1
Total		48	5

As of match played 17 November 2026
Scores and results list Tunisia's goal tally first, score column indicates score after each Ben Slimane goal.

List of international goals scored by Anis Ben Slimane
No.	Date	Venue	Opponent	Score	Result	Competition
1	9 October 2020	Hammadi Agrebi Stadium, Tunis, Tunisia	Sudan	3–0	3–0	Friendly
2	25 March 2021	Benina Martyrs Stadium, Benghazi, Libya	Libya	4–2	5–2	2021 Africa Cup of Nations qualification
3	15 June 2021	Hammadi Agrebi Stadium, Tunis, Tunisia	Mali	1–0	1–0	Friendly
4	7 September 2021	Levy Mwanawasa Stadium, Ndola, Zambia	Zambia	2–0	2–0	2022 FIFA World Cup qualification
5	17 November 2026	Tripoli Stadium, Tripoli, Libya	Libya	1–0	1–1	2027 Africa Cup of Nations qualification

== Honours ==
Brøndby

- Danish Superliga: 2020–21

Tunisia

- Kirin Cup Soccer: 2022
