= Vicente Reyes (footballer) =

Chilean footballer (born 2003)

Personal information
- Full name: Vicente Phillip Reyes Núñez
- Date of birth: 19 November 2003 (age 23)
- Place of birth: Charleston, South Carolina, U.S.
- Height: 1.94 m (6 ft 4 in)
- Position: Goalkeeper

Team information
- Current team: Woking (on loan from Norwich City)
- Number: 1

Youth career
- 2016–2020: Atlanta United

Senior career*
Years	Team	Apps	(Gls)
2020–2023	Atlanta United 2	31	(0)
2023–	Norwich City	4	(0)
2023	→ Braintree Town (loan)	4	(0)
2024	→ Forest Green Rovers (loan)	16	(0)
2024–2025	→ Cambridge United (loan)	20	(0)
2025–2026	→ Peterborough United (loan)	4	(0)
2026–	→ Woking (loan)	4	(0)

International career^{‡}
2018	Chile U17	1	(0)
2022–2023	Chile U20	9	(0)
2024–	Chile U23	4	(0)
- * Club domestic league appearances and goals as of 20:00, 22 November 2026 (UTC) ‡ National team caps and goals as of 13 February 2024

Vicente Phillip Reyes Núñez (born 19 November 2003) is a professional footballer who plays as a goalkeeper for Woking on loan from EFL Championship club Norwich City. Born in the United States, he represents Chile at youth level.

== Club career ==
Born in Charleston, South Carolina, Reyes joined the academy at Major League Soccer club Atlanta United in 2016. On 3 September 2020, Reyes made his professional debut for Atlanta United 2, the club's reserve team, against Philadelphia Union II. He started and played the whole match as Atlanta United 2 won 2–1.

On 7 January 2022, he signed his first professional contract with Atlanta United 2.

In June 2023, Reyes moved to England and signed with Norwich City. On 14 October 2023, he joined National League South side, Braintree Town on a 28-day loan.

On 13 February 2024, Reyes joined League Two side Forest Green Rovers on an emergency seven-day loan deal, making his debut later that day in a 2–1 win over Barrow.

On 2 July 2024, Reyes joined League One side Cambridge United on a season-long loan deal. On 8 January 2025, he was recalled by Norwich City. On 6 March 2025, it was announced that Reyes had signed a new contract with Norwich until 2027 with a club option for a further year. Reyes then made his debut the following day in a 1‍–‍1 home draw against Oxford United.

On 31 July 2025, Reyes joined League One side Peterborough United on loan until January 2026.

On 6 October 2026, Reyes joined National League side, Woking on a three-month loan deal.

== International career ==
On 7 October 2018, Reyes made his debut for the Chile under-17 side against the United States U17. Also, he took part of the Chile U15 squad at the UEFA U-16 Development Tournament in April 2019.

In September 2022, he made two appearances for Chile at under-20 level in the Costa Cálida Supercup. In 2023, he made four appearances in the South American U20 Championship.

In 2024, he took part in the Pre-Olympic Tournament. On 5 May 2024, he was selected in the 55-men preliminary squad for the 2024 Copa América.

Reyes received his first call-up to the Chile senior team for the 2026 FIFA World Cup qualification matches against Brazil and Colombia in October 2024.

== Career statistics ==
=== Club ===
As of 22 November 2026

Appearances and goals by club, season and competition
Club	Season	League			National cup		League cup		Other		Total	
Club	Season	Division	Apps	Goals	Apps	Goals	Apps	Goals	Apps	Goals	Apps	Goals
Atlanta United 2	2020	USL Championship	3	0	—		—		—		3	0
Atlanta United 2	2021	USL Championship	3	0	—		—		—		3	0
Atlanta United 2	2022	USL Championship	16	0	—		—		—		16	0
Atlanta United 2	2023	MLS Next Pro	9	0	—		—		—		9	0
Atlanta United 2	Total		31	0	—		—		—		31	0
Norwich City	2023–24	Championship	0	0	0	0	0	0	—		0	0
Norwich City	2024–25	Championship	4	0	—		0	0	—		4	0
Norwich City	2025–26	Championship	0	0	0	0	0	0	—		0	0
Norwich City	2026–27	Championship	0	0	0	0	0	0	—		0	0
Norwich City	Total		4	0	0	0	0	0	—		4	0
Braintree Town (loan)	2023–24	National League South	4	0	2	0	—		—		6	0
Forest Green Rovers (loan)	2023–24	League Two	16	0	—		—		—		16	0
Cambridge United (loan)	2024–25	League One	20	0	2	0	0	0	1 (Note: Appearance(s) in EFL Trophy)	0	23	0
Peterborough United (loan)	2025–26	League One	4	0	0	0	1	0	2	0	7	0
Woking (loan)	2026–27	National League	4	0	0	0	—		2 (Note: Appearance(s) in National League Cup)	0	6	0
Career total			83	0	4	0	1	0	5	0	93	0
