= Ken Aboh =

English footballer (born 2004)

Personal information
- Full name: Kenneth Nchang Aboh
- Date of birth: 9 November 2004 (age 21)
- Place of birth: England
- Height: 1.75 m (5 ft 9 in)
- Position: Forward

Team information
- Current team: Boston United (on loan from Norwich City)
- Number: 11

Youth career
- Norwich City

Senior career*
Years	Team	Apps	(Gls)
2023–	Norwich City	1	(0)
2024–2025	→ Stevenage (loan)	3	(0)
2025	→ Colchester United (loan)	2	(0)
2025–2026	→ Boston United (loan)	21	(1)
2026–	→ Boston United (loan)	5	(3)
- * Club domestic league appearances and goals as of 14:16, 5 September 2026 (UTC)

Kenneth Nchang Aboh (born 9 November 2004) is an English professional footballer who plays as a forward for Boston United, on loan from EFL Championship club Norwich City.

== Career ==
Aboh began his career with Norwich City, turning professional in 2022, and after a prolific time with the youth team, signed a new contract with the club in July 2024. At the start of the 2024–25 season Aboh was praised by new Norwich manager Johannes Hoff Thorup, and attracted interest from lower league clubs, before he signed on loan for Stevenage in August 2024. Stevenage manager Alex Revell said he was "delighted" with the transfer, and Aboh made his debut within 24 hours of signing. Aboh returned to Norwich on 9 January 2025.

In February 2025 he moved on loan to Colchester United.

On 4 November 2025, Aboh joined National League club Boston United on an initial one-month loan deal. On 3 December 2025, the loan deal was extended until January. On 7 January 2026, it was extended by a further month. On 2 February 2026, the loan was extended until the end of the season.

On 6 August 2026, he returned to Boston United on loan until the January transfer window.

== Career statistics ==
As of match played 24 March 2026

Appearances and goals by club, season and competition
Club	Season	League			FA Cup		EFL Cup		Other		Total	
Club	Season	Division	Apps	Goals	Apps	Goals	Apps	Goals	Apps	Goals	Apps	Goals
Norwich City	2023–24	Championship	1	0	0	0	0	0	0	0	1	0
Norwich City	2024–25	Championship	0	0	0	0	0	0	0	0	0	0
Norwich City	2025–26	Championship	0	0	0	0	0	0	0	0	0	0
Norwich City	Career total		1	0	0	0	0	0	0	0	1	0
Stevenage (loan)	2024–25	League One	3	0	1	0	0	0	3 (Note: Appearances in the EFL Trophy)	1	7	1
Colchester United (loan)	2024–25	League Two	2	0	0	0	0	0	0	0	2	0
Boston United (loan)	2025–26	National League	21	1	0	0	0	0	0	0	21	1
Career total			27	1	1	0	0	0	3	1	31	2

== Personal life ==
Aboh is of Nigerian descent. He holds both British and American nationalities.
