= Kellen Fisher =

English footballer (born 2004)

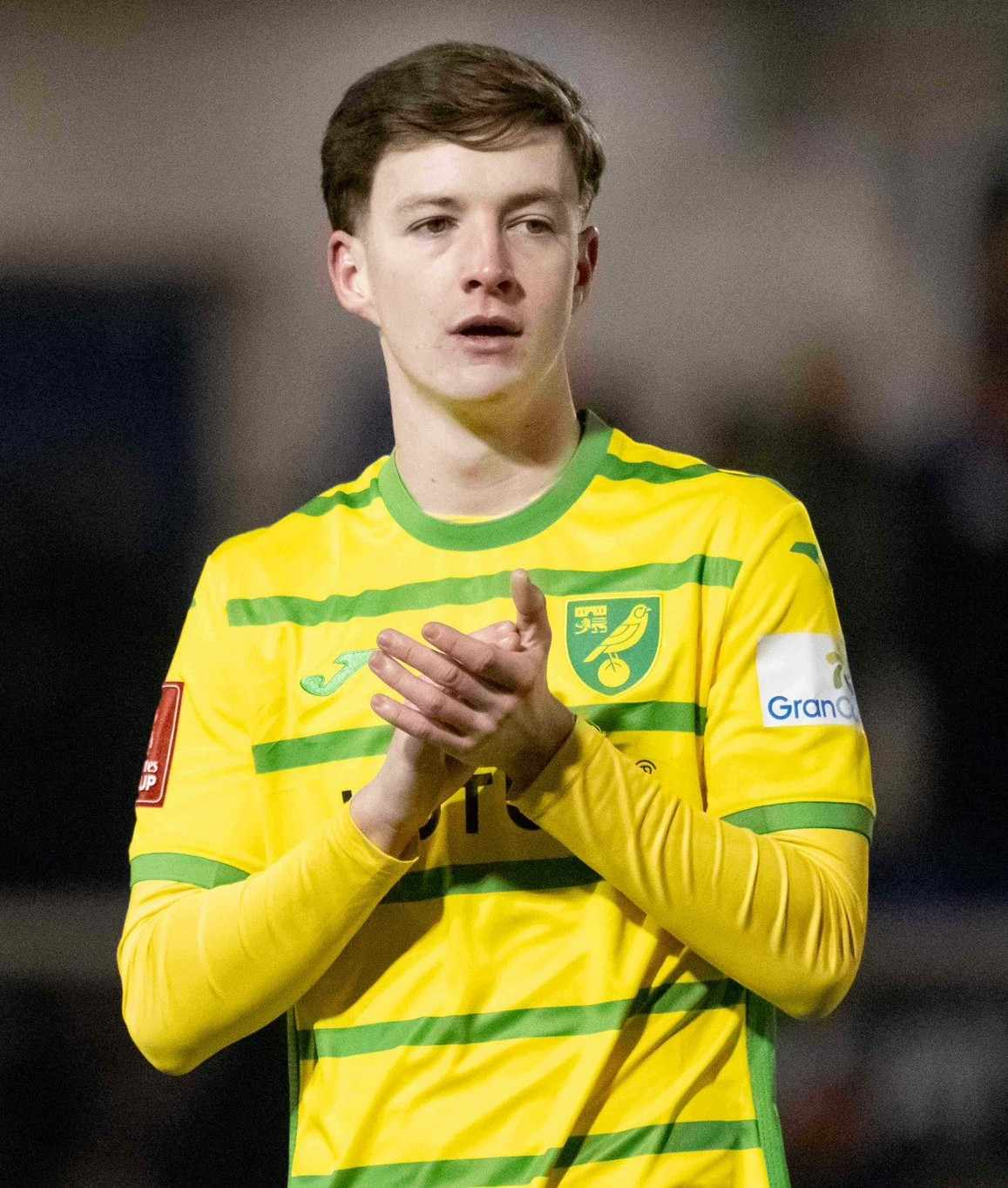
- Fisher in 2024

Personal information
- Full name: Kellen Lucas Fisher
- Date of birth: 5 May 2004 (age 22)
- Place of birth: Bexley, England
- Height: 1.82 m (6 ft 0 in)
- Position: Right-back

Team information
- Current team: Norwich City
- Number: 35

Youth career
- –2022: Bromley

Senior career*
Years	Team	Apps	(Gls)
2022–2023	Bromley	25	(0)
2022	→ Welling United (loan)	0	(0)
2022	→ Cray Wanderers (loan)	7	(0)
2023–	Norwich City	92	(0)

International career^{‡}
2024–2025	England U20	8	(0)
2025–	England U21	2	(0)
- * Club domestic league appearances and goals as of 31 August 2026 (UTC) ‡ National team caps and goals as of 23:51, 31 March 2026 (UTC)

Kellen Lucas Fisher (born 5 May 2004) is an English professional footballer who plays as a right-back for EFL Championship club Norwich City.

== Club career ==
=== Bromley ===
After coming through the Bromley academy, Fisher made his first team debut in an FA Trophy match against Dover Athletic in December 2021. He spent time on loan at National League South side Welling United in April 2022. In June 2022, he signed his first professional contract with Bromley. After starting the new season with two appearances in the National League, he joined Isthmian League Premier Division side Cray Wanderers on a one-month loan deal in October 2022. He made nine appearances in all competitions during his time with Cray Wanderers. In February 2023, he signed a new contract with Bromley. At the end of the 2022/23 season, Fisher was named the Sportsbeat Young Player of the Year, at the National Game Awards.

=== Norwich City ===
In June 2023, Fisher joined EFL Championship side Norwich City on a long-term deal. After being an unused substitute in the first two league games of the season, he made his professional debut in the EFL Cup first round match against Queens Park Rangers in August 2023, providing the assist for the winning goal. Fisher made his full EFL Championship debut, away to Sunderland in October 2023, providing the assist for the opening goal.

In September 2024 it was announced that Fisher had signed a new contract with the club until 2028 with an option for a further year. At the end of the season, he was awarded the Norwich City Young Player of the Season.

== International career ==
In May 2024, Fisher received his first call-up to the England under-20 national team for two games against Sweden and Republic of Ireland. He then made his debut, starting for the Three Lions in the first game against Sweden, on 7 June which ended 2–1 to England. Fisher was called up again to the England under-20 squad for the Elite League games against Turkey and Romania in September 2024, gaining two more caps for his country. In October 2024, Fisher was called up by England under-20 for Elite League games against Italy and Czechia, making two further appearances. In March 2025, Fisher played in an Elite League game against Portugal and an international friendly against Switzerland.

On 29 August 2025, Fisher was called up to the under-21s. He made his U21 debut in the 4-0 2027 UEFA European Under-21 Championship qualification victory away to Slovakia in Prešov.

== Career statistics ==
As of match played 2 May 2026

Appearances and goals by club, season and competition
Club	Season	League			FA Cup		League Cup		Other		Total	
Club	Season	Division	Apps	Goals	Apps	Goals	Apps	Goals	Apps	Goals	Apps	Goals
Bromley	2022–23	National League	25	0	0	0	—		5 (Note: Two appearances in National League play-offs, three appearances in FA Trophy)	0	30	0
Cray Wanderers (loan)	2022–23	Isthmian League	7	0	0	0	—		2	0	9	0
Norwich City	2023–24	Championship	9	0	2	0	3	0	0	0	14	0
Norwich City	2024–25	Championship	38	0	1	0	2	0	0	0	41	0
Norwich City	2025–26	Championship	43	0	2	0	2	0	0	0	47	0
Norwich City	Total		90	0	5	0	7	0	0	0	102	0
Career total			122	0	5	0	7	0	7	0	141	0

== Honours ==
Individual

- Sportsbeat Young Player of the Season: 2022-23
- Norwich City Young Player of the Season: 2024-25
