= Daniel Barden (footballer) =

Welsh footballer (born 2001)

Personal information
- Full name: Daniel James Barden
- Date of birth: 2 January 2001 (age 25)
- Height: 1.95 m (6 ft 5 in)
- Position: Goalkeeper

Team information
- Current team: Stevenage
- Number: 12

Youth career
- Arsenal
- 2019: Norwich City

Senior career*
Years	Team	Apps	(Gls)
2019–2026	Norwich City	2	(0)
2019–2020	→ Bury Town (loan)	23	(0)
2021–2022	→ Livingston (loan)	0	(0)
2022–2023	→ Maidstone United (loan)	14	(0)
2024–2025	→ Swindon Town (loan)	12	(0)
2025	→ Dagenham & Redbridge (loan)	3	(0)
2026–	Stevenage	1	(0)

International career^{‡}
2016	Wales U16	2	(0)
2019	Wales U19	3	(0)
2021	Wales U21	2	(0)
- * Club domestic league appearances and goals as of 20:25, 6 October 2026 (UTC) ‡ National team caps and goals as of 18:41, 7 September 2021 (UTC)

Daniel James Barden (born 2 January 2001) is a Welsh professional footballer who plays as a goalkeeper for EFL League One club Stevenage. He is a former Wales under-21 international.

== Club career ==
Barden signed for Norwich City from Arsenal in January 2019.

He spent the 2019–20 season on loan at Bury Town, making 26 appearances in all competitions.

In March 2020 he signed a new contract with Norwich.

On 5 September 2020, Barden made his first senior appearance for Norwich City in their EFL Cup first round tie against Luton Town. Norwich lost the game 3–1. He made his Football League debut on 29 December 2020 when he replaced the injured Michael McGovern at half-time during Norwich's 1–1 draw with Queens Park Rangers.

He moved on loan to Scottish Premiership club Livingston in July 2021.

He was diagnosed with testicular cancer in October 2021, and said that he would be taking a break from football. On 26 December 2021, he gave an interview with Norwich City's matchday programme where he said the treatment had gone well and he thanked the fans, the club and his family for their support.

On 13 December 2022, Barden signed for National League club Maidstone United on loan.

In August 2024 he moved on loan to Swindon Town. He was recalled by Norwich on 7 March 2025.

On 2 September 2025, he signed for National League South side Dagenham & Redbridge on loan until the beginning of January 2026.

On 24 April 2026, Norwich City announced that Barden would leave the club at the end of his contract that summer.

On 6 August 2026, Barden joined League One side Stevenage on a free transfer.

== International career ==
Barden has played for Wales at under-19 level. In March 2021 he was called up by the Wales under-21 squad for the first time, for the friendly match against Republic of Ireland later that month.

== Career statistics ==
As of match played 6 October 2026

Appearances and goals by club, season and competition
Club	Season	League			National cup (Note: Includes FA Cup, Scottish Cup)		League cup (Note: Includes EFL Cup, Scottish League Cup)		Other		Total	
Club	Season	Division	Apps	Goals	Apps	Goals	Apps	Goals	Apps	Goals	Apps	Goals
Norwich City U23	2020–21	—	—		—		—		1 (Note: Appearances in EFL Trophy)	0	1	0
Norwich City	2020–21	Championship	2	0	1	0	1	0	—		4	0
Norwich City	2021–22	Premier League	0	0	0	0	0	0	—		0	0
Norwich City	2022–23	Championship	0	0	0	0	0	0	—		0	0
Norwich City	2023–24	Championship	0	0	0	0	0	0	—		0	0
Norwich City	2024–25	Championship	0	0	0	0	0	0	—		0	0
Norwich City	2025–26	Championship	0	0	0	0	0	0	—		0	0
Norwich City	Total		2	0	1	0	1	0	0	0	4	0
Livingston (loan)	2021–22	Scottish Premiership	0	0	0	0	1	0	—		1	0
Maidstone United (loan)	2022–23	National League	14	0	0	0	—		3 (Note: Appearances in the FA Trophy)	0	17	0
Swindon Town (loan)	2024–25	League Two	12	0	0	0	0	0	4	0	16	0
Dagenham & Redbridge (loan)	2025–26	National League South	3	0	0	0	—		0	0	3	0
Stevenage	2026–27	League One	1	0	0	0	0	0	2	0	3	0
Career total			32	0	1	0	2	0	10	0	45	0
