= AJ (given name) =

The given name or nickname AJ may refer to:

== In arts and media ==
- A. J. Alan (1883–1941), English magician, intelligence officer, short story writer, and radio broadcaster
- AJ Alexander (born 1980), American model and Playboy Playmate
- A. J. Antoon (1944–1992), American theatre director
- A. J. Bakunas (1950–1978), American stuntman
- A. J. Balaban (1889–1962), American showman
- A. J. Befumo Jr. (born 1976), American internet personality
- A. J. Beirens (1947–2020), Belgian radio producer and journalist
- A. J. Benza (born 1962), American gossip columnist and television host
- A. J. Bermudez, American author and screenwriter
- A. J. Bowen (born 1977), American actor and producer
- AJ Bridel (born c. 1994), Canadian actress and singer
- A. J. Brown (1897–1978), English theatre, film, and television actor
- A. J. Buckley (born 1977), Irish-Canadian actor
- A. J. Calloway (born 1974), American television personality
- A. J. Carothers (1931–2007), American playwright and television writer
- A. J. Casson (1898–1992), Canadian artist
- AJ Castillo (born 1994), American singer, recording artist, accordionist, singer, performer, and producer
- A. J. Cook (born 1978), Canadian actress
- A. J. Croce (born 1971), American singer and songwriter
- A. J. Cronin (1896–1981), Scottish physician and novelist
- A. J. Dalton (born 1970), British fantasy writer and teacher
- A. J. Daulerio (born c. 1974), American writer and blogger
- A. J. W. Dawson, English singer-songwriter
- AJ Dee, (born 1982), Filipino actor, model, and swimmer
- A. J. Finn (born 1979), American editor and author
- A. J. Gibson (1862–1927), American architect
- Lee Gi-kwang "AJ" (born 1990), South Korean entertainer
- AJ Gil (born 1984), American singer, songwriter, and actor
- AJ Glueckert, American opera singer
- A. J. Gundell, American musician and music director
- A. J. Hammer (born 1966), American television and radio personality
- A. J. Hartley (born 1964), British-American novelist
- A. J. Haulcy (born 2004), American football player
- A. J. Healy (born 1969), Irish author
- A. J. Holmes (born 1988), American actor, singer, and composer
- A. J. Jackson, American filmmaker, musician, songwriter, and record producer
- A. J. Jacobs (born 1968), American journalist and author
- Adrienne Janic (born 1974), American actress and television host
- AJ Junior, real name Achraf Janussi, songwriter
- A. J. Kardar (1926–2002), Pakistani film director, producer, and screenwriter
- A. J. S. Lakshmi Shree (born 1996), Bangalore-Indian visual artist
- AJ Lamas (born 1983), American actor
- AJ Lambert (born 1974), American musician
- A. J. Langer (born 1974), American actress
- A. J. Langguth (1933–2014), American author, journalist, and educator
- A. J. Liebling (1904–1963), American journalist
- A.J. LoCascio, American actor, director, and producer
- A. J. Masters (1950–2015), American country singer
- AJ McLean (born 1978), American singer and member of the band Backstreet Boys
- A. J. Meek (born 1941), American photographer, teacher, and writer
- AJ Michalka (born 1991), American actress and musician
- A. J. Mills (1872–1919), English lyricist
- AJ Mitchell (born 2001), American singer-songwriter
- A. J. Mogis, American musician
- AJ Muhlach (born 1992), Filipino actor, singer and member of the XLR8
- AJ Nelson (born 1985), Ghanaian recording artist
- AJ Odasso (born 1981), American author and poet
- AJ Odudu Onatejiro "AJ" Odudu (born 1988), British television presenter
- AJ Pearce (born 1964), English author
- A. J. Pero (1959–2015), American drummer of the band Twisted Sister
- AJ Perez (born 1981), Filipino blogger and motivational speaker
- AJ Perez (1993–2011), Filipino actor
- A. J. Potter (1918–1980), Irish composer and teacher
- AJ Pritchard (born 1994), English dancer and choreographer
- A. J. Quinnell, pen name for the English novelist, Philip Nicholson
- AJ Rafael (born 1989), Filipino-American singer-songwriter
- A.J. Rathbun, American author, mixologist, poet, and cooking instructor
- A. J. Riebli (born 1969), American voice actor and executive
- AJ Roach (born 1975), American singer-songwriter
- A. J. Sass, American author
- A.J. Saudin (born 1992), Canadian actor, singer, songwriter, and record producer
- A. J. Schnack (born 1968), American filmmaker
- A. J. Seymour (1914–1989), Guyanese poet, essayist, memoirist, and editor
- A. J. Smith, British author
- A. J. M. Smith (1902–1980), Canadian poet and anthologist
- A. J. Thomas (born 1952), Indian poet, translator, and editor
- AJ Tracey (born 1994), British rapper, singer, songwriter, and record producer
- A. J. Trauth (born 1986), American actor and musician
- A. J. Turner (1818–1905), American composer, band leader, and professor
- A. J. Verdelle (born 1960), American novelist

== In sports ==
- A. J. Abrams (born 1986), American basketball player
- A. J. Achter (born 1988), American baseball pitcher and college baseball coach
- AJ Agazarm (born 1990), American Brazilian Jiu-Jitsu practitioner and mixed martial arts fighter
- AJ Alatimu (born 1993), Samoan rugby union player
- A. J. Alexy (born 1998), American baseball pitcher
- A. J. Allen (born 1998), Canadian football player
- A. J. Allmendinger (born 1981), American racing driver
- AJ Andrews (born 1993), American softball player
- A. J. Arcuri (born 1997), American football player
- AJ August (born 2005), American cyclist
- A. J. Banal (born 1988), Filipino boxer
- A. J. Barner (born 2002), American football player
- A. J. Bear (born 1977), Australian alpine skier
- A. J. Bouye (born 1991), American football player
- A. J. Bramlett (born 1977), American basketball player
- A. J. Brodeur (born 1996), American basketball player
- A. J. Brown (born 1997), American football player
- A. J. Burnett (born 1977), American baseball pitcher
- A. J. Cann (born 1991), American football player
- A. J. Christoff (born c. 1945), American college football coach
- A. J. Cochran (born 1993), American soccer player
- AJ Coertzen (born 1990), South African rugby union player
- A. J. Cole (born 1992), American baseball pitcher
- A. J. Cole III (born 1995), American football player
- A. J. Cooper, American football player and coach
- A. J. Corrado (born 1992), American soccer player
- A. J. Cruz (born 1991), American football player
- A. J. Davis (born 1983), American football player
- A. J. Davis (born 1989), American football player
- A. J. Davis (born 1995), American basketball player
- A. J. DeLaGarza (born 1987), American soccer player
- A. J. Derby (born 1991), American football player
- A. J. Dillon (born 1998), American football player
- AJ Dixon (1886–1935), British racing driver
- A. J. Duhe (born 1955), American football player
- AJ Dungo, American surfer and illustrator
- AJ Dybantsa (born 2007), American basketball player
- A. J. Edds (born 1987), American football player
- Adam AJ Edelman (born 1991), American-born four-time Israeli National Champion in skeleton event, and Israeli Olympian
- A. J. Edu (born 2000), Cypriot-Filipino basketball player
- A. J. Ellis (born 1981), American baseball catcher and coach
- A. J. English (born 1967), American basketball player
- A. J. English (born 1992), American basketball player
- A. J. Epenesa (born 1998), American football player
- A. J. Ewing (born 2004), American baseball player
- AJ Faigin (born 1947), American sports agent
- A. J. Feeley (born 1977), American football player
- A.J. Ferrari (born 2001), American wrestler
- A. J. Fike (born 1980), American racing driver
- AJ Finley (born 2001), American football player
- AJ Fitzpatrick (born 2004), American wheelchair basketball player
- A. J. Foyt (born 1935), American racing driver
- A. J. Foyt IV (born 1984), grandson of the above; American racing driver and football scout
- A. J. Francis (born 1990), American wrestler, musician, and football player
- A. J. Freeley, New Zealand wrestler
- A. J. Gale (born 1987), Canadian ice hockey player
- A. J. Gass (born 1975), Canadian football player
- AJ George (born 1996), Antiguan footballer
- A. J. Ghent (born 1986), American singer-songwriter, record producer, and guitarist
- AJ Gilbert (born 1987), Australian rugby union player
- AJ Ginnis (born 1994), Greek-American alpine ski racer
- A. J. Godbolt (born 1984), American soccer player
- A. J. Granger (born 1978), American basketball player
- A. J. Graves (born 1985), American basketball player
- A. J. Gray (born 1988), Canadian soccer player
- AJ Greaves (born 2000), English footballer
- A. J. Green (born 1988), American football player
- A. J. Green (born 1998), American football player
- A. J. Green (born 1999), American basketball player
- A. J. Greer (born 1996), Canadian ice hockey player
- A. J. Griffin (born 1988), American baseball pitcher
- AJ Griffin (born 2003), American basketball player
- A. J. Guyton (born 1978), American basketball player and coach
- A. J. Haglund (born 1983), American football kicker
- A. J. Hammons (born 1992), American basketball player
- A. J. Harmon (born 1989), American football player
- A. J. Harris (running back) (born 1984), American football player
- A. J. Haulcy (born 2004), American football player
- A. J. Hawk (born 1984), American football player
- A. J. Hendy (born 1993), American football player
- A. J. Henning (born 2001), American football player
- A. J. Henriksen (born 1979), American racing driver
- AJ Hill (born 2007), American football player
- A. J. Hinch (born 1974), American baseball player and coach
- A. J. Holmes Jr. (born 2003), American football player
- AJ Hurt (born 2000), American alpine ski racer
- AJ Jacobs (born 1985), South African rugby referee
- A. J. Jenkins (born 1989), American football player
- AJ Jennings (born 1971), Australian Paralympic canoeist
- A. J. Jiménez (born 1990), Puerto Rican baseball player
- A. J. Johnson (born 1967), American football player
- A. J. Johnson (born 1991), American football player
- A. J. Johnson (born 1992), American bowler
- A. J. Jones (born 1959), American football player
- Anthony Joshua (born 1989), British boxer, of Nigerian descent, nicknamed "AJ"
- A. J. Kitt (born 1968), American alpine ski racer
- A. J. Klein (born 1991), American football player
- AJ Koller, American professional pickleball player
- A. J. Ladwig (born 1992), American baseball pitcher
- AJ Lam (born 1998), New Zealand rugby union player
- A. J. Lawson (born 2000), Canadian basketball player
- AJ Lee (born 1987), ring name for April Jeanette Mendez, an American professional wrestler
- A. J. Lockhart (1898–1986), American baseball player
- AJ MacGinty (born 1990), Irish rugby player
- A. J. Mandani (born 1987), Filipino-Canadian basketball player
- AJ Marcucci (born 1999), American soccer player
- A.J. Matthews (born 1988), American mixed martial artist
- A. J. McCarron (born 1990), American football player
- A. J. McKee (born 1995), American mixed martial artist
- A. J. Miller (born 1989), American baseball coach
- A. J. Milwee (born 1986), American football player and coach
- A. J. Minter (born 1993), American baseball pitcher
- A. J. Mleczko (born 1975), American ice hockey player and analyst
- A. J. Moore (born 1995), American football player
- A. J. Morris (born 1986), American baseball pitcher
- A. J. Moyer (born 1987), American racing river
- A. J. Murray (born 1982), American baseball pitcher
- AJ Newberry (born 2005), American football player
- A. J. Nicholson (born 1983), American football player
- A. J. Ofodile (born 1973), American football player
- A. J. Ouellette (born 1995), American football player
- A. J. Pagano, American football player
- A. J. Parker (born 1998), American football player
- A. J. Paterson (born 1996), American soccer player'
- A. J. Petrucci (born 1951), American wrestler
- A. J. Pierzynski (born 1976), American baseball player
- A. J. Pollock (born 1987), American baseball player
- A. J. Preller (born 1977), American baseball general manager
- A. J. Price (born 1986), American basketball player
- A.J. Puckett (born 1995), American baseball pitcher
- A. J. Puk (born 1995), American baseball pitcher
- A. J. Raebel (born 1985), American football player
- A. J. Ramos (born 1986), American baseball pitcher
- A. J. Reed (born 1993), American baseball player
- A. J. Reeves (born 1999), American basketball player
- A. J. Richardson (born 1995), American football player
- A. J. Rose (born 1997), American football player
- AJ Rosen (born 1984), British-American luge Olympian
- A. J. Sager (born 1965), American baseball player
- A. J. Schable (born 1984), American football player
- A. J. Schugel (born 1989), American baseball pitcher
- A. J. Shannon (born 1980), Canadian lacrosse player
- A. J. Shepherd (1926–2005), American racing driver
- A. J. Simcox (born 1994), American baseball player
- A. J. Slaughter (born 1987), American-Polish basketball player
- A. J. Smith (1949–2024), American football player, coach, scout, and executive
- AJ Smith-Shawver (born 2002), American baseball pitcher
- A. J. Soares (born 1988), American soccer player
- A. J. Sturzenegger (1888–1949), American football and baseball player and coach
- A.J. Styles (born 1977), ring name for Allen Jones, an American professional wrestler
- A. J. Suggs (born 1980), American football player
- AJ Swann, American football player
- A. J. Tarpley (born 1992), American football player
- A. J. Terrell (born 1998), American football player
- A. J. Thelen (born 1986), American ice hockey player
- A. J. Thomas (born 1999), American football player
- A. J. Trapasso (born 1986), American football punter
- AJ Venter (born 1973), South African rugby union player
- A. J. Verel, American kickboxer, martial artist, actor, and stuntman
- A. J. Vukovich (born 2001), American baseball player
- A. J. Wallace (born 1988), American football player
- A. J. Walton (born 1990), American basketball player
- A. J. Watson (1924–2014), American racing car builder and chief mechanic
- A. J. Webbe (1855–1941), English cricketer
- A. J. Whitaker (born 1992), American volleyball player
- A. J. Wood (born 1973), American soccer player
- A. J. Wynder (born 1964), American basketball player and coach

== In other fields ==
- A. J. Aitken (1921–1998), Scottish lexicographer and scholar
- A. J. Mohammad Ali, Bangladeshi politician
- A. J. Whitacre Allen (1857–1939), British Army officer
- A.J. Andrews (1865–1950), Canadian politician
- A. J. Arkell (1898–1980), British archaeologist and colonial administrator
- A. J. Ayer (1910–1989), English philosopher
- A. J. Baker (1922–2017), Australian philosopher
- A. J. Balaban (1889–1962), co-founder of Balaban and Katz
- A. J. Barnes, American politician
- A. J. Beck (1914–2006), American Air Force major general
- A. J. Blackwell (1842–1903), American businessman
- A. J. Bliss (1862–1931), British iris breeder
- A. J. Bernheim Brush, American computer scientist
- A. J. Braga (1900–1968), Singaporean lawyer and politician
- A. J. Butcher, English writer
- A. J. Cook (1883–1931), British trade union leader
- A. J. R. de Soysa (1869–1939), Ceylonese proprietor and politician
- A. J. Delgado, American attorney, political commentator, and writer
- A. J. DeMedio (1916–1997), American politician
- A. J. Eddy (1880–1976), American politician
- A. J. Folley (1896–1981), American judge
- A. J. Gibson (1862–1927), American architect
- A. J. Gillbo (1858–1919), American politician
- A. J. Hackett (born 1958), New Zealand entrepreneur and bungy jumper
- A.J. Han Vinck (born 1949), Dutch computer scientist and academic
- A. J. Hedding (1883–1954), American politician
- A. J. Holloway (1939–2018), American politician
- A. J. Humbert (1821–1877), British architect
- A. J. Irwin (born 1957), American federal agent
- A. J. Iversen (1888–1979), Danish cabinetmaker and furniture designer
- A. J. John (1893–1957), Indian freedom fighter and statesman
- A. J. T. Johnsingh (born 1945), Indian ecologist
- A. J. B. Johnston, Canadian historian, novelist, and museum writer
- A.J. Timothy Jull (born 1951), American radiocarbon scientist
- AJ Kanwar (born 1948), Indian dermatologist
- AJ Kerr (1922–2010), South African scholar
- A. J. Khubani (born 1959), American inventor, entrepreneur, and marketing executive
- A. J. H. Latham (born 1940), British economic historian
- A. J. Mackenzie (1912–1945), Scottish barrister, soldier, and author
- A. J. Manikannan, Indian politician
- A. J. McCosh (1858–1908), American surgeon
- A. J. McNamara (1936–2014), American politician and judge
- A. J. W. McNeilly (1845–1911), Irish-Canadian lawyer and politician
- AJ Mediratta, American investor
- A. J. Mills (1841–1925), American politician
- A. J. A. Morris (born 1936), British historian
- A. J. Mundella (1825–1897), British manufacturer and politician
- A. J. Muste (1885–1967), Dutch-American clergyman and political activist
- A. J. M. Muzammil, Sri Lankan politician
- AJ Enayet Nur, Bangladeshi politician
- A. J. Pardini (1932–2011), American politician
- A. J. Pollard (born 1941), British medieval historian
- A. J. P. Ponrajah (1927–1986), Sri Lankan civil engineer
- A. J. Ranasinghe (1927–2022), Sri Lankan politician, state minister, and diplomat
- A. J. Reid (c. 1909–1993), Canadian politician
- A. J. Roberts (1863–1939), Australian businessman
- A. J. Rosier (1880–1932), American politician
- A. J. Russell (1852–1902), American politician
- A. J. R. Russell-Wood (1940–2010), Welsh historian
- A. J. Sabath, American politician
- A. J. Sampson (1839–1921), American diplomat, lawyer, and politician
- A. J. Sefi (1889–1934), English philatelist and stamp dealer
- A. J. Smitherman (1883–1961), American lawyer, journalist, and civil rights activist
- A. J. Spiker, American politician
- A. J. H. Stewart (1860–1917), Canadian politician
- A. J. Sylvester (1889–1989), British civil servant
- A. J. A. Symons (1900–1941), English writer and bibliographer
- A. J. Taylor (1911–2002), English historian
- A. J. Thomas Jr. (1923–2004), American politician
- A. J. P. Taylor (1906–1990), British historian
- A. J. Thomas (disambiguation), multiple people
- A. J. Weberman (born 1945), American political activist, gadfly, and writer
- A. J. Wickwar, Sri Lankan general
- A. J. Witono (1925–1989), Indonesian military officer and diplomat
- Jill Price (born 1965), the first diagnosed hyperthymestic, originally identified as "AJ"

== Fictional characters ==
- AJ Ahmed, character in the British soap opera EastEnders
- A.J. Arno, character in the American film trilogy, Dexter Riley
- AJ Chandler, character in the American drama All My Children
- A. J. Chegwidden, character in the American series JAG
- A. J. Quartermaine, character in the American soap opera General Hospital
- A. J. Raffles, character created by British writer, E. W. Hornung
- A.J. Soprano, character in the American series The Sopranos
- AJ, character in the American cartoon Blaze and the Monster Machines
- AJ, character in the American cartoon The Fairly OddParents
