= Jan Groover =

American photographer (1943–2012)

- Born: April 24, 1943; Plainfield, New Jersey
- Died: January 1, 2012 (aged 68); Montpon-Ménestérol
- Education: Pratt Institute, Ohio State University
- Known for: Photography

Jan Groover (April 24, 1943 – January 1, 2012) was an American photographer. She received numerous one-person shows, including at the Museum of Modern Art in New York, which holds some of her work in its permanent collection.

== Early life ==
Groover was born and grew up in Plainfield, New Jersey.

She studied painting and drawing at Pratt Institute. She received a Bachelor of Fine Arts degree in 1965 from Pratt Institute, and a Master of Arts in Education in 1970 from Ohio State University.

== Photographic career ==
Groover began to use photography as a form of artwork in the early 1970s. Her first work to receive recognition was a series of color triptychs of the urban environment.

Her first large-format camera was bought immediately after winning a 1978 grant from the National Endowment for the Arts. Groover was noted for her use of emerging color technologies. In 1979, she began to use platinum prints for portraits and to transform everyday items into formal still lifes. In 1987, critic Andy Grundberg noted in The New York Times, "In 1978 an exhibition of her dramatic still-life photographs of objects in her kitchen sink caused a sensation. When one appeared on the cover of Artforum magazine, it was a signal that photography had arrived in the art world – complete with a marketplace to support it."

Groover also used early 20th century camera technology, such as the banquet camera, for elongated, horizontal presentations of otherwise pedestrian items. In a New York Times review of her work exhibited at Janet Borden Inc., New York, in 1997, critic Roberta Miller called Groover's work "beautiful and masterly in the extreme."

Groover used unconventional painting techniques in the composition of her photography. She used color, artificial lighting, and large scale printing to enhance her works. Groover also used lighting and texture to hide the identity of items in her work and instead combine multiple items to give an overall impression.

Groover's work was the subject of a mid-career retrospective at the Museum of Modern Art in 1987, for which an accompanying catalogue was printed. Her work has also been the subject of one-person exhibitions at the Baltimore Museum of Art; Cleveland Museum of Art; the Corcoran Gallery of Art, Washington, DC; and the International Museum of Photography, George Eastman House, Rochester, New York.

Groover was the subject of a short film by photographer Tina Barney entitled (Jan Groover: Tilting at Space, 1994).

Groover and her husband, a painter and critic named Bruce Boice, left the United States and moved to Montpon-Ménestérol, France in 1991. She had felt demoralized by what she felt was a turn toward deep political conservatism in the United States. On this occasion, Groover purchased a larger camera and shifted her work from still-life photographs of everyday objects to photos of her surroundings in France, including landscapes, churches, and graveyards.

She died in 2012, having been ill for some time. A large collection of her work lives at the Lausanne Museum in Switzerland.

== Awards ==
- National Endowment for the Arts Fellowship, 1978
- Guggenheim Fellowship, 1978
- National Endowment for the Arts Fellowship, 1983

== Publications ==
- New York: Neuberger Museum, State University of New York at Purchase, 1983.
- Groover, Jan. Jan Groover: Photographs. New York: Museum of Modern Art.
- Kismaric, Susan and Jan Groover. Jan Groover. New York: Museum of Modern Art, 1987.
- Groover, Jan. Pure Invention – The Tabletop Still Life. Washington: Smithsonian Institution, 1990.
- Groover, Jan. Jan Groover: Photographs. Boston: Little, Brown, 1993.
- Franck, Tatyana, ed. Jan Groover, Photographer: Laboratory of Forms. Zurich: Scheidegger & Spiess; Lausanne: Musée de l'Elysée, 2019. Accompanies the related exhibition at Musée de l'Elysée, Lausanne, September 18, 2019 – January 5, 2020.

== Exhibitions ==
- Light Gallery, New York City, NY 1974
- Time and Information 1975 (group exhibition)
- Max Protech Gallery, NY 1976
- Sonnabend Gallery, NY, January 1977
- Jan Groover Color Photographs, Milwaukee Art Museum Photography Gallery, November 13, 1980 – January 11, 1981
- Three on Technology: Photographs by Robert Cumming, Lee Friedlander, and Jan Groover, Virginia Museum of Fine Arts, Richmond, VA, October 24 – December 10 1989
- Three on Technology: Photographs by Robert Cumming, Lee Friedlander, and Jan Groover, MIT, Boston, MA May 7 – June 26, 1988
- Jan Groover : Recent Still Life Photography, Nancy Drysdale Gallery, N.W Washington, D.C., April 28 – May 29, 1993
- Retrospectives, Museum of Modern Art, New York
- Jan Groover Laboratory of forms, Musée de l'Élysée, Lausanne, Switzerland, September 18, 2019 – January 5, 2020; Fondation Henri Cartier-Bresson, Paris, France, November 8, 2022 – January 29, 2023

== Collections ==
Groover's work is held in the permanent collections of the Amon Carter Museum of American Art, the Museum of Modern Art, New York, and the Museum of Fine Arts Houston.
