= General Beck =

General Beck may refer to:

- A. J. Beck (1914–2006), U.S. Air Force major general
- Edward Beck (British Army officer) (1880–1974), British Army major general
- Ludwig Beck (1880–1944), German Army general
- Stanley C. Beck (born 1929), U.S. Air Force major general

== See also ==
- John Becke (1879–1949), Royal Air Force brigadier general
- Friedrich von Beck-Rzikowsky (1830–1920), Austrian Imperial Army colonel general
