= A. J. Thomas =

A. J. Thomas may refer to:

- A. J. Thomas (American football) (born 1999), American football player
- A. J. Thomas (poet) (born 1952), American poet
- A. J. Thomas Jr. (1923–2004), American politician
