= Long War =

Long War can refer to:

- Long Turkish War, a war between the Habsburgs and the Ottoman Empire from 1593 to 1606
- Long War (20th century), a concept describing several wars from 1914 to 1990 as one long war
- Long War (Provisional IRA strategy), a strategy followed by the Provisional IRA since the 1970s
- "Long War", a name proposed in 2006 by U.S. military leaders for the war on terror
- The Long War (novel), a science fiction novel by Terry Pratchett and Stephen Baxter
- Long War (mod), a partial conversion modification to the video games XCOM: Enemy Unknown and XCOM: Enemy Within
- The Long War, 2010s dark fantasy book series by A.J. Smith

== See also ==
- List of wars extended by diplomatic irregularity for a list of wars made very long by diplomatic technicalities
- Perpetual war, a military and political concept
- List of longest wars
- The Longest War: The Enduring Conflict between America and Al-Qaeda, a 2011 book by Peter Bergen
