= G. J. Langford =

American politician

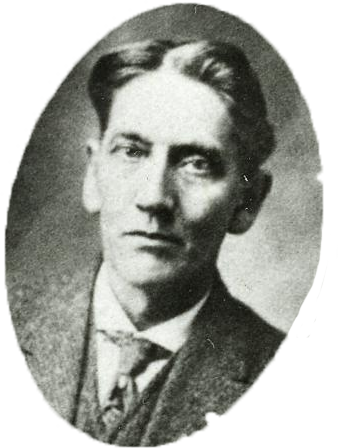
- Langford in 1913

Member of the Washington House of Representatives for the 39th district
- In office 1913–1915

Personal details
- Born: 1862 Illinois, United States
- Died: February 25, 1917 (aged 54–55) Ashland, Oregon, United States
- Party: Progressive

Guilford J. Langford (1862 – February 25, 1917) was an American politician in the state of Washington. He served in the Washington House of Representatives. He was elected as a Progressive in 1912, alongside A. J. Gillbo. He died in 1917 after a long illness.
