= 817th Air Division =

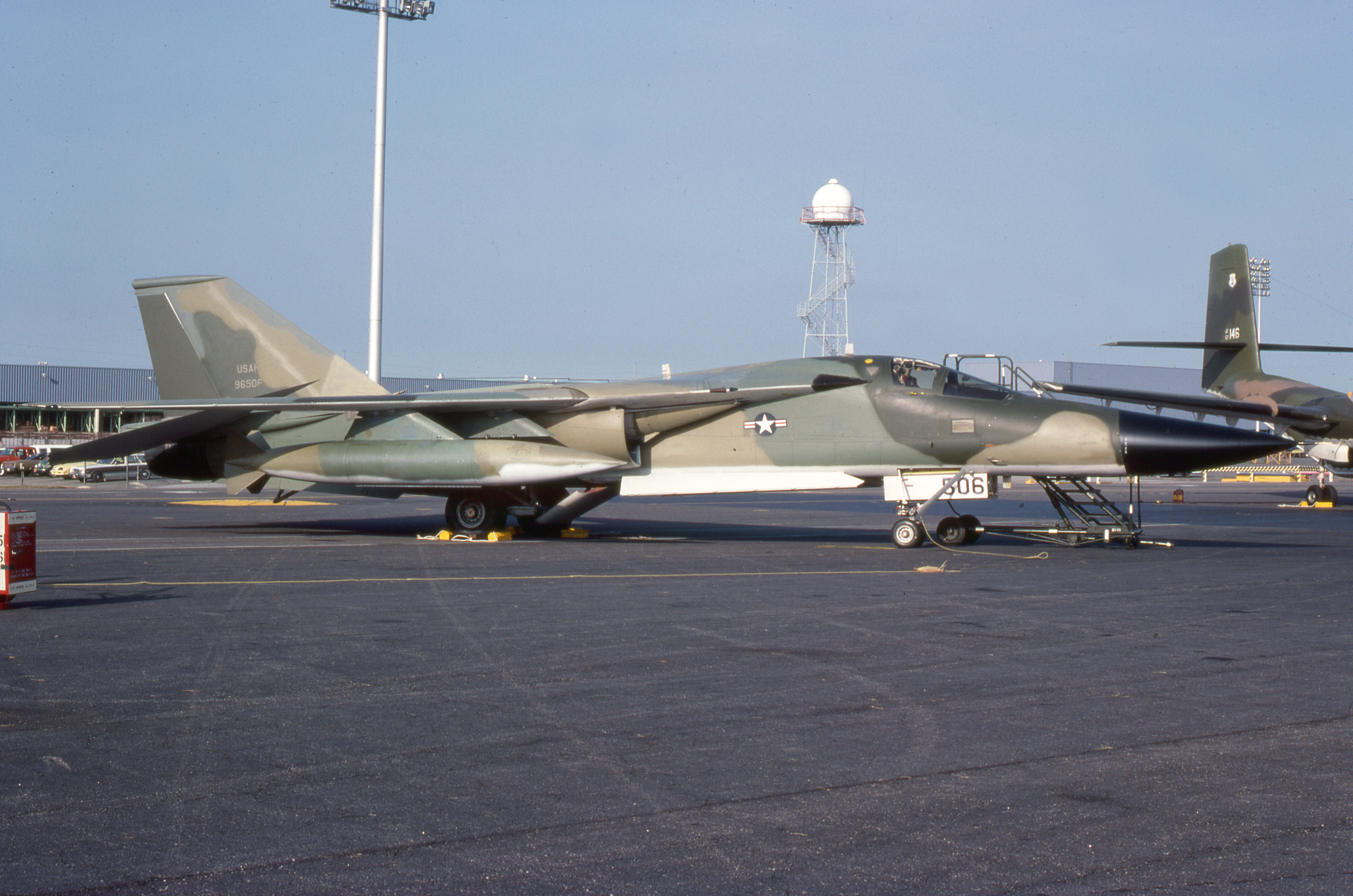
- 817th Air Division FB-111A at Plattsburgh AFB (Note: Aircraft is General Dynamics FB-111A, serial 69-6506, Lady Lightning. It was converted to F-111G configuration and transferred to Tactical Air Command. Later, it was transferred to the Royal Australian Air Force and assigned serial A8-506. It was scrapped and its fuselage buried in a landfill in November 2011.)
- Active: 1956–1971
- Country: United States
- Branch: United States Air Force
- Role: Command of strategic strike units

Insignia
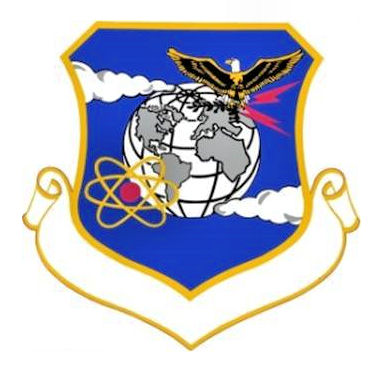
- 817th Air Division emblem (Note: Approved 29 January 1958. Description: Azure, a sphere argent, land masses gray, grid lines and outlines sable, between and surmounted by in dexter chief and sinister base a cloud formation fesswise of the second [color mentioned], and in sinister chief an eagle or, head and tail feathers white, shading and details of the fourth [color mentioned], grasping an olive branch of the last [color mentioned] and two lightning bolts gules, and in dexter base an atomic symbol of the fifth [color mentioned], nucleus of the sixth [color mentioned], all within a diminished border gold.)

The 817th Air Division is an inactive United States Air Force organization. Its last assignment was with Strategic Air Command, assigned to Second Air Force, at Pease Air Force Base, New Hampshire, where it was inactivated on 30 June 1971.

The division was activated in early 1956 to provide a single headquarters at Pease in anticipation of the move of the 509th Bombardment Wing to join the 100th Bombardment Wing there. The division also commanded the Pease host unit, the 817th Combat Support Group. As the Boeing B-47 Stratojet began to be phased out in 1965 and 1966, the division became an operational headquarters for dispersed Boeing B-52 Stratofortress wings in the Northeastern United States. In 1970 two of its wings began converting to the General Dynamics FB-111. It was inactivated in 1971 and its mission, personnel and equipment were transferred to the 45th Air Division.

== History ==
The 817th Air Division was activated by Strategic Air Command (SAC) at Portsmouth Air Force Base, New Hampshire in February 1956 in anticipation of the move of the 509th Bombardment Wing to Portsmouth (Note: On 7 September 1957, the base was renamed Pease Air Force Base. Mueller, p. 467) from Walker Air Force Base, New Mexico. Its mission was to assume operational command of the 509th and of the 100th Bombardment Wing, which had been activated at Portsmouth one month earlier. In June the division also assumed base support functions through its 817th Air Base Group, which was manned from the inactivating 100th Air Base Group. Through the 817th group, the division also controlled the special weapons at Portsmouth, which were managed by the 11th (and after 1957) 41st Aviation Depot Squadrons. The division initially supervised and directed the organization and training of the two wings, which were equipped with Boeing B-47 Stratojet bombers and Boeing KC-97 Stratofreighters.

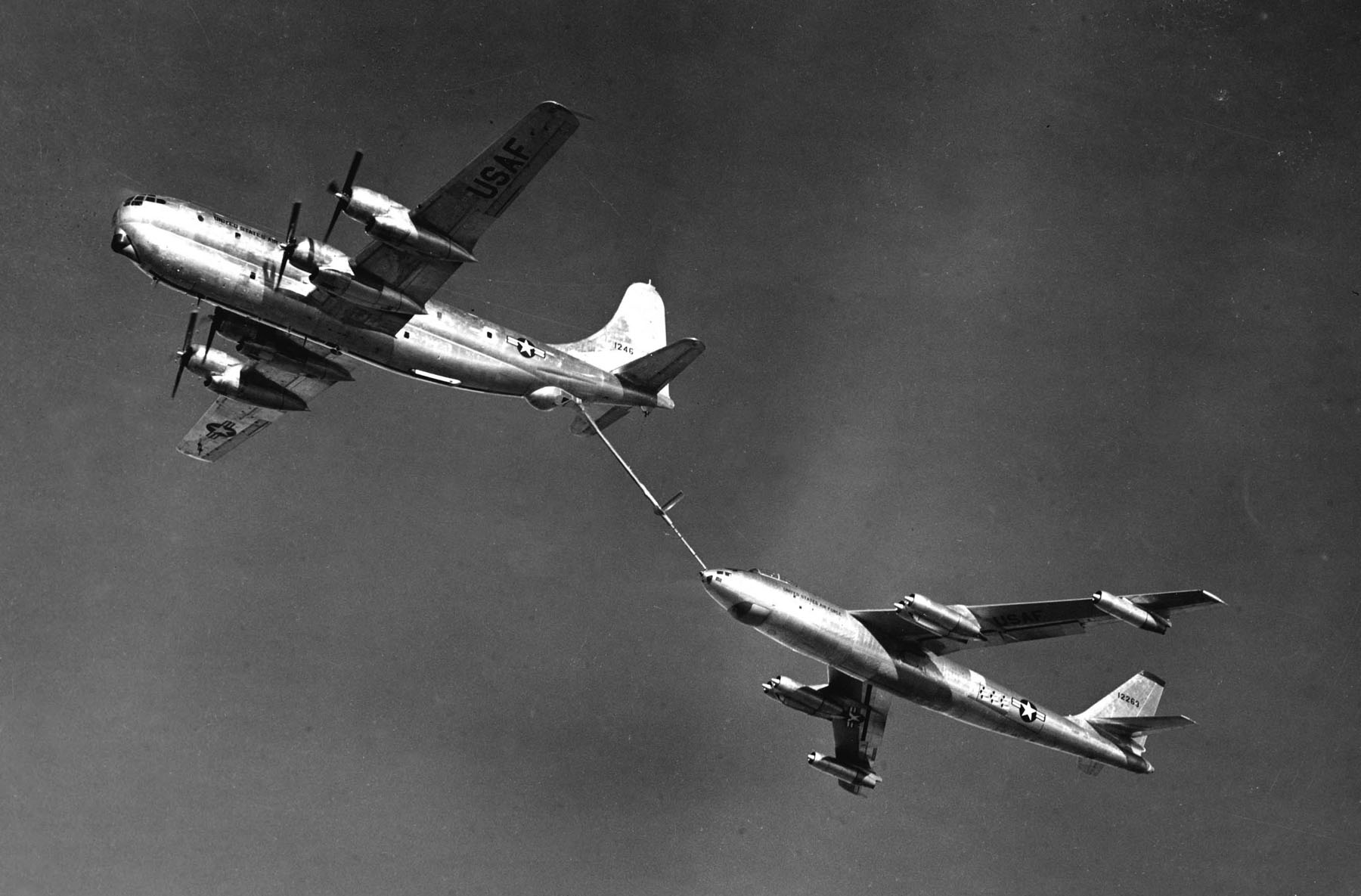
KC-97 refueling a B-47

Once its assigned wings were combat ready, the division mission was to maintain a force capable of immediate and sustained long range offensive bombardment and air refueling operations anywhere in the world. Starting in 1960, one third of each wing's aircraft were maintained on fifteen-minute alert, fully fueled and ready for combat to reduce vulnerability to a Soviet missile strike. This was increased to half their aircraft in 1962.

In 1965, the 817th was assigned wings located at other bases for the first time. In March the 301st Air Refueling Wing at Lockbourne Air Force Base, Ohio was assigned. The 301st operated EC-135s of the Post Attack Command and Control System (PACCS) in addition to its KC-135A tankers. However, this assignment lasted only six months before the 301st was transferred to another SAC division. In June, the 380th Strategic Aerospace Wing (Note: The 380th was designated a strategic aerospace wing because it had operated SM-65 Atlas missiles until March 1965. See Ravenstein, pp. 205–206.) at Plattsburgh Air Force Base, New York was assigned as the division's third B-47 wing.

The B-47s of the division's three wings also began to be phased out in 1965. The 509th Bombardment Wing prepared for inactivation. However, this plan was altered, and instead in 1966, the 509th converted to Boeing B-52 Stratofortress and Boeing KC-135 Stratotanker aircraft. The 380th wing made a similar conversion to B-52s and KC-135s the same year. The 100th wing became non-operational in April 1966. With only a single operational wing stationed at Pease, the division transferred its base support functions to the 509th wing and became an operational headquarters. In June, the 100th wing moved on paper to Davis-Monthan Air Force Base, Arizona, where it was reassigned to the 12th Strategic Aerospace Division and assumed the mission, personnel and aircraft of the 4080th Strategic Wing. (Note: The Air Force Historical Research Agency Factsheet for the 817th Air Division includes U-2, WU-2 and DC-130 aircraft as division equipment in 1966. However, the 100th wing did not operate these aircraft until it moved and was reassigned.) The 817th gained a third dispersed B-52 wing in September 1966, when the 416th Bombardment Wing at Griffiss Air Force Base, New York was assigned.

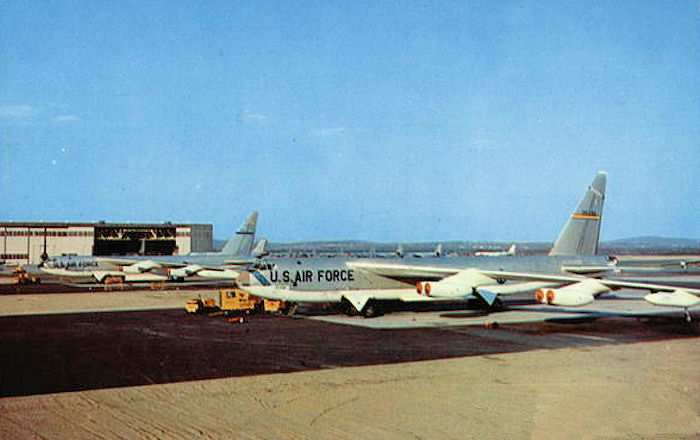
B-52s at Westover AFB

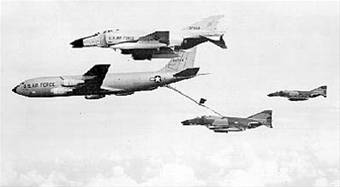
A deployed KC-135A refuels F-4 Phantoms in Southeast Asia

The division's wings deployed B-52 and KC-135 aircraft and crews to SAC units in the Pacific that were involved in combat operations during the Vietnam War for Operation Arc Light and the Young Tiger Task Force. At times, its wings became nonoperational because all their operational resources and most of their support elements were deployed to the Pacific. In July 1968, the 17th Bombardment Wing at Wright-Patterson Air Force Base, Ohio replaced the 380th wing for a year, but in July 1969 the 17th and 416th wings were transferred from division control, while the 380th returned and the 99th Bombardment Wing at Westover Air Force Base, Massachusetts was also assigned. The 99th wing assignment returned the PACCS mission to the division. This lasted until the departure of Eighth Air Force from Westover to replace the 3d Air Division as SAC's command element in the Pacific in 1970, eliminating the need for an airborne backup of the numbered air force's command post. This move also resulted in the 817th being reassigned to Second Air Force.

The 509th wing lost its bomber aircraft in 1970 as it prepared for conversion to the new General Dynamics FB-111. The 380th wing had also begun conversion to the FB-111 when the division was inactivated in June 1971 and its mission, personnel and equipment were transferred to the 45th Air Division, which was simultaneously activated at Pease.

== Lineage ==
- Constituted as the 817th Air Division on 24 January 1956

Activated on 1 February 1956
Inactivated on 30 June 1971

=== Assignments ===
- Eighth Air Force, 1 February 1956
- Second Air Force, 31 March 1970 – 30 June 1971

=== Stations ===
- Portsmouth Air Force Base (later Pease Air Force Base), New Hampshire, 1 February 1956 – 30 June 1971

=== Components ===
Wings

- 17th Bombardment Wing: 2 July 1968 – 2 July 1969

Wright-Patterson Air Force Base, Ohio

- 99th Bombardment Wing: 2 July 1969 – 30 June 1971

Westover Air Force Base, Massachusetts

- 100th Bombardment Wing: 1 February 1956 – 25 June 1966 (attached to 7th Air Division 29 December 1957 – 1 April 1958)
- 301st Air Refueling Wing: 15 March 1965 – 15 November 1965

Lockbourne Air Force Base, Ohio

- 380th Strategic Aerospace Wing: 25 June 1965 – 1 July 1968; 2 July 1969 – 30 June 1971

Plattsburgh Air Force Base, New York

- 416th Bombardment Wing: 2 September 1966 – 2 July 1969

Griffiss Air Force Base, New York

- 509th Bombardment Wing : 1 July 1958 – 30 June 1971

Groups

- 817th Air Base Group (later 817th Combat Support Group): 15 June 1956 – 1 March 1966
- 817th Medical Group: 1 March 1959 – 1 March 1966

Squadrons

- 19th Air Refueling Squadron: 1 July 1964 – 25 June 1966
- 509th Air Refueling Squadron: 5 January 1958 – 1 May 1958

Other

- 4018th USAF Dispensary: 15 June 1956 – 1 March 1959

=== Aircraft ===
- Boeing B-47 Stratojet, 1956–1966
- Boeing KC-97 Stratofreighter, 1956–1966
- Boeing EC-135 1965, 1969–1970
- Boeing KC-135 Stratotanker, 1965–1971
- Boeing B-52 Stratofortress, 1966–1971
- General Dynamics FB-111 1970–1971

=== Commanders ===
Col James W. Chapman Jr., 1 February 1956;
Brig Gen Walter E. Arnold, 23 February 1956
Brig Gen Jack J. Catton, 6 July 1959
Brig Gen A. J. Beck, 24 July 1961
Gen Robert B. Miller, by 31 July 1963
Maj Gen Robert W. Strong, by 30 June 1965
Col William T. Cumiskey, by 30 June 1966
Brig Gen Morgan S. Tyler Jr., by 31 August 1967
Brig Gen Eugene Q. Steffes Jr., 1 February 1970 – 30 June 1971

== See also ==
- List of United States Air Force air divisions
- List of USAF Bomb Wings and Wings assigned to Strategic Air Command
- List of B-52 Units of the United States Air Force
- List of B-47 units of the United States Air Force
