= Hans Humes =

American investor and commentator

- Born: Bethesda, Maryland, U.S.
- Education: Williams College (BA)
- Occupation: Investment Advisor
- Known for: Emerging markets, Sovereign debt restructuring

Hans Humes (born Willem J. Humes) is an American investor and commentator on financial markets and sovereign debt restructurings. He is the president and chief investment officer at Greylock Capital Management, an alternative investment adviser. He was co-chair of the Global Committee of Argentina Bondholders following the 1998–2002 Argentine great depression, and was on the steering committee of investors engaged in the Greek sovereign debt restructuring.

== Early life and education ==
Humes was born in Bethesda, Maryland and spent his childhood in Canada, Mexico, Nigeria, Morocco, and Chile. He completed high school at The Lawrenceville School in 1983 and matriculated at Williams College that same year, earning a Bachelor of Arts degree in literature in 1987. Humes captained the Williams College Ultimate Frisbee team, otherwise known as 'WUFO', during the 1985-86 academic year.

== Career ==
After graduating from Williams College, Humes entered investment banking working for Manufacturer’s Hanover, then Banco Santander and then Lehman Brothers, focusing on proprietary debt trading in Latin America. At Lehman Brothers, he was a member of the emerging markets debt trading team and helped manage over $500 million of assets. He subsequently joined Van Eck Global as a portfolio manager for a fund engaged in emerging market fixed-income investments. In 2004, Humes founded Greylock Capital as a joint venture with Van Eck Global managing a portfolio similar to the one he managed at Van Eck Global. He is the firm's president and chief investment officer.

Greylock Capital is an Securities and Exchange Commission registered alternative investment adviser that invests in investing in undervalued, distressed, and high yield assets worldwide, particularly in emerging markets. Greylock Capital and its partners have participated on a number of corporate and sovereign debt restructurings. In addition to the sovereign restructurings of Argentina and Greece, Humes and Greylock Capital participated in the restructurings of Republics of Ivory Coast (2010), Ecuador (2009) and Liberia (2009). Humes currently represents Greylock Capital on the creditor committee of Venezuela's approximately 9 billion USD sovereign debt.

Humes is a regular contributor to public debate through his television and radio appearances and newspaper interviews. His commentary often focuses on strategy and developing trends related to emerging markets investments and sovereign debt restructurings.

During the second Trump term, Hume was identified with a group of lobbyists, oilmen, and political influencers who advocated easing sanctions on Venezuela. His involvement however, was characterized as indirect and driven by financial interest instead of attempts to influence policymaking. Greylock Capital has investments in a range of Venezuelan government bonds.

== Personal life ==
Humes engages in a number of civic and charitable endeavors, including sitting on the boards of the New York Theatre Workshop and the MacDella Cooper Foundation, a foundation established to improve the lives of Liberian orphans. He is on the board of the Wendy Hilliard Foundation, which offers gymnastics training and instruction to girls in the NY metropolitan area. He is on the advisory board of the World Policy Institute, a New York City-based international affairs think tank.

Humes is fluent in Spanish.
