= Greylock Capital Management =

Greylock Capital Management, LLC
- Type: Private
- Industry: Asset management
- Founded: 2004; 22 years ago
- Founder: Hans Humes (CEO)
- Headquarters: New York City, US
- Key people: AJ Mediratta (President)
- Products: Hedge fund Emerging markets High Yield; Fixed Income
- Website: GreylockCapital.com

Greylock Capital Management, LLC (Greylock Capital) is a U.S. Securities and Exchange Commission registered alternative investment adviser that invests globally in high yield, undervalued, and distressed assets worldwide, particularly in emerging and frontier markets. The firm was founded in 2004 by Hans Humes from a portfolio of emerging market assets managed by Humes while at Van Eck Global. AJ Mediratta joined the firm in 2008 from Bear Stearns and serves as its president.

The firm principally invests in high yield, emerging market fixed income instruments with a particularly long track record in sovereign debt restructuring.

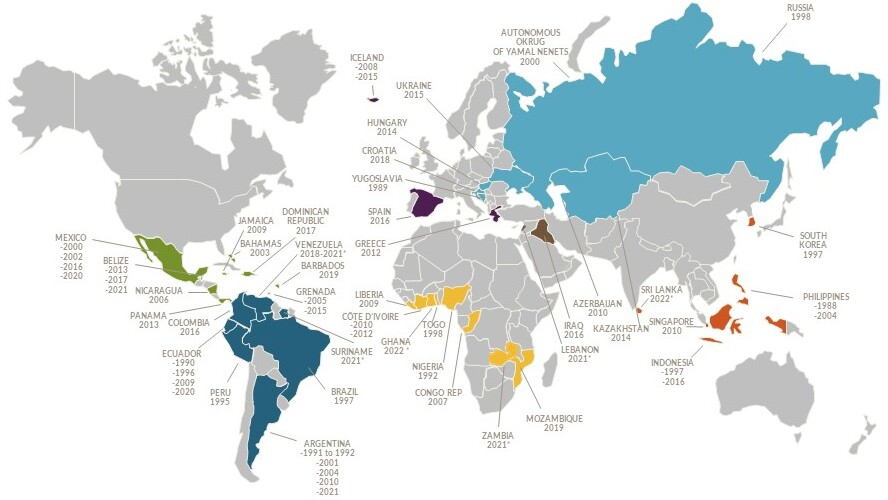
Global restructuring activity of Greylock Capital Management

== Sovereign Debt Restructuring Highlights ==
=== Greece ===
Greylock Capital served on the 12-member steering committee of investors engaged in the Greek sovereign debt restructuring. The firm was the sole American representative on the Greek bond steering committee, which controlled approximately 20% of all outstanding external Greek government debt. Greylock Capital was cited as one of the earlier fund investors in Greek debt, investing as early as 2011 when the bonds were trading as low as 12 cents on the dollar. Greylock Capital promoted the concept of debt warrants, whereby Greek government repayments were tied to economic growth. The subsequent exchange offer was the largest sovereign debt restructuring in history.

=== Argentina ===
Greylock Capital Founder Hans Humes served as co-chair of the Global Committee of Argentina Bondholders following the Argentine Republic's debt default in 2002. The Argentine default is the largest sovereign default in history.

=== Barbados ===
In October 2019, Barbados came agreed to terms with a creditor committee that allowed the country to restructure its approximately 7bn USD in sovereign debt. The creditor committee, co chaired by Eaton Vance Management and Greylock Capital, agreed to terms including an estimated 26% principal haircut and a new instrument maturing in 2029. The new bond includes a "Hurricane Clause", which allows the island to suspend payments and capitalize interest in the event of a weather-related disaster.

=== Belize ===
Following Belize's 2012 default on approximately US$500 million debt, a creditor committee of approximately 20 institutions formed. The creditor committee was co-leading by Greylock Capital and Zurich Insurance Group and several multilateral institutions were engaged as part of the restructuring process (i.e. the International Monetary Fund, the Inter-American Development Bank, the Caribbean Development Bank, US Department of Treasury, Institute of International Finance and Paris Club. A restructuring was concluded with the government in 2012 that achieved 86% investor participation. Such high participation rates are desired by countries undergoing debt restructuring because it significantly reduces the likelihood of future investor-initiated litigation.

=== Ivory Coast ===
After having issued $2.8 billion in Brady Bonds in 1998, the Republic of the Ivory Coast defaulted on the debt in 2002 upon the outbreak of a civil war. Greylock Capital participated in the Republic's creditor committee and played a lead role in closing a deal between the republic and bondholders. Greylock Capital engaged multilateral institutions, including the World Bank, in order to effect a restructuring that was compatible with creditor rights and with the principles of debt relief under the HIPC Initiative. The Ivory Coast restructuring was completed in 2010.

=== Lebanon ===
The firm is currently part of a creditor group involved in discussions with the Lebanese Republic over Lebanon's 1.2 billion sovereign Eurobond. Other members of the Creditor Committee include Franklin Templeton Investments

As the national financial crisis worsened and the country's banks imposed liquidity restrictions, parliament speaker Nabih Berri stated that a debt restructuring was the best solution for the disposition of the Eurobond.

=== Liberia ===
Greylock Capital served on the creditor committee of an investor group restructuring Liberia's pre-crisis debt, a transaction which enabled the country to regain international capital. As the largest commercial creditor to Liberia, Greylock Capital used its strong relationships with the existing government to lead a committee of investors to work with multilateral and non-financial partners to provide a framework for a successful restructuring of outstanding Liberian claims. The restructuring, completed in April 2009, featured several innovative elements, including Liberia's ability to do a significant, one-time only restructuring of all commercial claims. Unlike so-called vulture funds, Greylock Capital was highlighted for its negotiated method of sovereign debt restructuring.

=== Mozambique ===
A global creditor committee formed in 2016 following Mozambique's announcement of default on its outstanding external sovereign debt. Committee discussions focused on the need to create near-term fiscal space for the country, which remains one of the world's poorest, while preserving upside for bond investors associated with Mozambique's vast offshore gas reserves. Consideration was also given to initiatives to improve transparency and resolve the scandal around undisclosed loans, both of which were viewed as critical in the country's efforts to normalize its relationship with the IMF and bilateral donors. Greylock Capital led the negotiations that resulted in a preliminary agreement on restructuring terms that were finalized in late 2019. An exchange offer for the existing bonds closed in October 2019 with a final participation rate in excess of 98%.

=== Suriname ===
In 2021, the firm was part of a creditor committee in discussions with the Suriname concerning the restructuring of approximately $675 million in loans undertaken by the country. Other members of the creditor committee included Franklin Templeton, Eaton Vance, GMO Investments. The Suriname debt restructuring closed successfully in mid-2023 in a deal that was broadly supported by the International Monetary Fund and by bondholders.

=== Ghana ===
The firm is a member of the creditor committee for the restructuring of approximately 20 billion USD of Ghana's outstanding debt. After an unexpected announcement of default by the country in 2022, Ghana began working with multilateral and commercial creditors on a restructuring. A September 2024 offer by Ghana was accepted by creditors and marks the conclusion of the debt restructuring process, allowing Ghana to regain access to international credit markets.

=== Venezuela ===
As of April 2024, the firm is a member of the official creditor committee for the restructuring of Venezuelan sovereign debt.

== Small Company Relief Under Coronavirus Aid, Relief, and Economic Security Act ==
In February 2021, Greylock Capital Management sought relief under the Coronavirus Aid, Relief, and Economic Security (CARES) Act. The act passed in March 2020 and included certain temporary amendments to the US Bankruptcy Code. One such amendment allowed small businesses to undergo an expedited filing process. The February 2021 filing by Greylock Capital was done at the holding company level and facilitated a restructuring of its office rental lease. The holding company exited bankruptcy after three months, in April 2021. The operating companies and operations of Greylock Capital were never impacted by the filing and functioned normally throughout that brief, 3-month process.
