= A. J. Meek =

American photographer (1941–2025)

- Born: Albert James Meek; August 29, 1941; Beatrice, Nebraska, U.S.
- Died: November 8, 2025 (aged 84); Baton Rouge, Louisiana, U.S.
- Education: Ohio University; Art Center College of Design
- Known for: Photography
- Spouse: Belinda Van Dyk (1963–2022)
- Website: ajmeek.com

Albert James Meek (August 29, 1941 – November 8, 2025) was an American photographer, teacher and writer. Meek was known for his selenium toned silver gelatin contact prints made with an 8 x 20 banquet camera of landscapes in Louisiana and the American West and for images that are a balance between the documentary tradition and the fine arts.

== Background ==
Albert James Meek was born in Beatrice, Nebraska, on August 29, 1941. His first name was after his father, Albert A. Meek, and his middle name is a family name on the side of his mother, Alta Mae Williams. Emerson James, Meek's great-grandfather was a full-blooded Choctaw and a U.S. Marshal in the Indian territory of Oklahoma. His father's Czech ancestors resided in Ravenna, Nebraska, a railroad town located between Kearney and Grand Island. His other great-grandfather A.V. Hlava, a 32nd Degree Scottish Rite Mason, owned and operated a hardware store where eight family members often worked.

Meek was married to Belinda Van Dyk (born 1941) until her death in 2022. They had one daughter, Patricia Lynn (born 1967).

Meek died at his Baton Rouge home on November 8, 2025, at the age of 84.

== Military service ==
Meek's first photography experience was with the USAF (1963–1967) where he was trained "on the job" at Larson AFB (Strategic Air Command) in Moses Lake, Washington. In 1965, he was transferred to RAF Bentwaters (Tactical Fighter Command) in the UK where he served out his remaining enlistment.

== Education ==
In Los Angeles under the GI bill, Meek earned a BFA in Photography from the Art Center College of Design, studying with Todd Walker. Awarded a teaching assistantship at Ohio University (the Clarence White School of Photography), he earned an MFA in Photography with Arnold Gassan as his thesis advisor.

== Early influences ==
Meek was influenced by many art photographers of the modern era including visionaries; such as, Eugene Atget, Minor White, and Paul Caponigro to name a few.

== Teaching ==
Meek's first teaching position was with the Art Department, Utah State University, where he taught for five years. Then, Meek accepted a position at Louisiana State University and was the senior professor of the photography program, School of Art. He was promoted in rank to full professor in 1988; was awarded the Emogene Pliner Distinguished Professorship in Art in 2002; and retired as professor emeritus in 2005. He was selected to be the Garrey Carruthers Distinguished Professor in the Honors Program at the University of New Mexico for the academic year 2009–2010.

== Grants ==
Meek was the recipient of several grants for his work, such as,

- Two Louisiana Endowment for the Humanities grants for "Vanishing Sugar" (2011) and for "Clarence John Laughlin" (1999).
- Two Southern Arts Federation and the National Endowment for the Arts Fellowships, unrestricted career enhancement awards (1993) and (1987).
- Division of the Arts Fellowship, unrestricted career enhancement award (1991).
- National Endowment for the Arts Exhibition Aid Grant for "Spirit of Utah 1876-1976." A historical and contemporary collection of photographs depicting the activities of people and events of the state's history to preserve its cultural heritage (1976).
- Selected to take the portraits of these 26 women: "Remembering the Struggle," edited by Roberta Madden. Portraits and oral histories of 26 Baton Rouge women who have struggled for human rights. Made possible by grants from the Louisiana Humanities Council and the Louisiana State Arts Council. 1983.

== Photography ==
The core of Meek's work was photographing the landscape in his adopted State of Louisiana. People, gardens, churches, sugar cane mills, rural landscapes, and heavy industry in the region were many of his subjects. He used large format cameras (8 x 20 banquet, 8 x 10 field, and 4 x 5 field). Other projects included the Highlands of Scotland, American West, the central valley of California, and the Boboli Gardens in Florence. Selected to serve on the Board of Advisors to the former Civil War Center at Louisiana State University inspired his ten-year study photographing the major battlefield parks. His work has been exhibited in national and international museums, galleries, and included in many public and private collections. Prints and negatives from his archives before 1996 have been acquired by The Historic New Orleans Collection.

Meek was included in these publications:

- A Unique Slant of Light: The Bicentennial History of Art in Louisiana, Louisiana Endowment for the Humanities, published by University Press of Mississippi, page 305, September 20, 2012. ISBN 9781617036903.
- KnowLa: Encyclopedia of Louisiana, presented by the Louisiana Endowment for the Humanities.
- Treasures of LSU, edited by Laura F. Lindsay, published by Louisiana State University Press 2010. 'Raging Chaos' photographs by A. J. Meek, article by Marchita B. Mauck, pages 110-111. In celebration of Louisiana State University's sesquicentennial, a publication of the numerous and diverse riches found throughout the Baton Rouge campus and beyond. ISBN 9780807136782.

== Photography books ==
- The Healing Presence: Photographs of the Sky and Children's Perception of Hope, Sunstone Press, 2014. Photographs by A. J. Meek. ISBN 9780865340329.
- Sacred Light: Holy Places in Louisiana, University Press of Mississippi, 2010. Photographs by A. J. Meek and essay by Marchita Mauck. An inspired visual journey of the interiors of churches and synagogues located in south Louisiana. ISBN 9781604737417.
- Clarence John Laughlin: Prophet without Honor, University Press of Mississippi, 2007. A biography of the famous New Orleans photographer from birth to death. The book explores Laughlin's work and the controversy that brought him fame. ISBN 9781578069095.
- Gettysburg to Vicksburg: The Five Original Civil War Battlefield Parks, University of Missouri Press, 2001. Photographs by A. J. Meek and text by Herman Hattaway. ISBN 9780826213211.
- Gardens of Louisiana: Places of Work and Wonder, Louisiana State University Press, 1997. Photographs by A. J. Meek and text by Suzanne Turner. A photographic book that depicts Louisiana's garden culture. Inspired by the French photographer Eugene Atget's photographs of St. Cloud and Versailles. ISBN 9780807121078.
- Exploring Black and White Photography, Arnold Gassan/A. J. Meek. WCB Publishers, 1992. A textbook of technical and the aesthetics of black and white photography. ISBN 9780697125231.
- Red Pepper Paradise, Avery Island, Louisiana, Audubon Park Press, New Orleans, 1986. Photographs by A. J. Meek, text by Jo Gulledge. A photographic book that depicts the mysteries of Avery Island, home of Tabasco pepper sauce, the International Salt Company, and the Jungle Gardens. ISBN 9780961645205.
- Spirit of Utah 1860-1976, Utah State University Art Department, 1976. A collection of historical and contemporary photographs found in Utah alerting the populace to their cultural heritage. This project was supported by a grant from the National Endowment for the Arts and Utah State University. ISBN 0874210895.

== Exhibitions, selected ==
- Kennedy Museum of Art, "Contemplative Cameras," work of photographers Kenji Kawano, A. J. Meek, and Frederick Schreiber, Ohio University, Athens, Ohio, 2012-2013.
- New Orleans Museum of Art and The Historic New Orleans Collection, "Residents and Visitors: Twentieth-Century Photographs of Louisiana," New Orleans Museum of Art in City Park, New Orleans, 2010.
- Alfred C. Glassell Gallery, Shaw Center for the Arts, "The Sky is Gray, visual works inspired by Ernest Gaines," Baton Rouge, Louisiana, 2008.
- Louisiana Art for Louisiana Places. A traveling exhibition sponsored by the Division of the Arts for photographers who have received Division of the Arts Grants in Photography, 2002.
- "A Sense of Place: A Sense of Presence, A Louisiana Retrospective Show 1977-2001," photographs by A. J. Meek and essay 'A Sense of Place; A Sense of Presence' by Dr. Richard Cox. Exhibition at Louisiana Arts and Science Museum, Baton Rouge, July 31 – September 16, 2001.
- "Battlefield: Vicksburg to Gettysburg; Photographs of Civil War Battlefields," photographs by A. J. Meek, Lamar Dodd Art Center, LaGrange, Georgia. Curated by John D. Lawrence, Director. December 1996 - March 1997.
- "The South by Its Photographers," Birmingham Museum of Art, Birmingham, Alabama, October 20 - December 18, 1996. Meek's photographs selected to represent exhibition's published poster.
- Photographs from "A Sense of Place; A Sense of Presence" and the "Sacred Mesa," photographs by A. J. Meek, The AfterImage Gallery, Dallas, Texas, September 9 to October 25, 1994.
- "Close to Home," New Orleans Museum of Art, curated by Nancy Barrett. A supplementary exhibition to the traveling show, "Between Home and Heaven: Contemporary American Landscape Photography", curated by Merry Foresta. February 28 - March 24, 1993.
- "Emerging Southern Photographers," Memphis College of Art, March, Memphis, Tennessee, 1992.
- "Silent Witness: Photographs from the South," Society for Contemporary Photography, Kansas City, Missouri, August 31 - October 7, 1990.
- "New Southern Photographers," Burden Gallery, New York, New York, June - July 1989. "New Southern Photography, Between Myth and Reality," with catalog published by Aperture, Volume 115, The Burden Gallery, Aperture Foundation, New York, New York.
- "Southwest Fine Arts Biennial," Museum of New Mexico, Santa Fe, New Mexico, 1976.

== Collections, selected ==
- The Historic New Orleans Collection, New Orleans, Louisiana.
- New Orleans Museum of Art, New Orleans, Louisiana.
- Museum of Fine Arts, Houston, Texas.
- Harry Ransom Center, University of Texas, Austin, Texas.
- Center for Creative Photography, University of Arizona, Tucson, Arizona.
- Louisiana Arts and Science Museum, Baton Rouge, Louisiana.
- Ogden Museum of Southern Art, New Orleans, Louisiana.
- Royal Commission on the Ancient and Historical Monuments of Scotland, Edinburgh, United Kingdom.
