= A. J. Thomas Sr. =

American politician (died 1967)

Member of the Florida House of Representatives from Bradford County
- In office 1927

Personal details
- Died: March 14, 1967 (aged 69)
- Party: Democratic
- Children: A. J. Thomas Jr.

A. J. Thomas Sr. (died March 14, 1967) was an American politician. He served as a Democratic member of the Florida House of Representatives.

== Life and career ==
Thomas was an Orlando businessman and civic leader.

Thomas served in the Florida House of Representatives in 1927.

Thomas died in March 1967, at the age of 69.
