= A.J. Rathbun =

A.J. Rathbun is an author, mixologist, poet, and cooking instructor originally from Manhattan, Kansas, and now based in Seattle, Washington. Rathbun's books include Good Spirits (The Harvard Common Press, 2007), which won an award for Best Food Styling and Photography from the International Association of Culinary Professionals.

Rathbun earned a MFA in creative writing from Western Michigan University in 1996.

Rathbun has appeared on radio shows including Martha Stewart’s Everyday Food, and has contributed articles to multiple magazines. He is a member of the International Association of Culinary Professionals and The Museum of the American Cocktail, and teaches cocktail classes at the cooking school Dish It Up, in Seattle.

== Bibliography ==
- Luscious Liqueurs
- Party Snacks!
- Wine Cocktails
- Champagne Cocktails
- Ginger Bliss and the Violet Fizz
- Dark Spirits
- Double Take (Collaboration with Jeremy Holt)
- Good Spirits
- Party Drinks!
- In Their Cups
- Want (Poetry)
