= A. J. P. Ponrajah =

A. J. P. Ponrajah FICE
- Born: 4 February 1927
- Died: 26 January 1986 (aged 58)
- Occupation: Civil engineer

Anthony James Princely Ponrajah was a leading Sri Lankan civil engineer and Director of Irrigation in Sri Lanka.

== Early life ==
Ponrajah was born on 4 February 1927. He was the son of Ponrajah, a proctor from Mannar in northern province of Ceylon. After school he obtained a BSc degree from the University of London.

Ponrajah married Tirzah, daughter of the Chief Postmaster Fry from Jaffna. They had three children - Dr Anthony Naushad, Ranendra and Rupvanthy.

== Career ==
After graduating in 1950 Ponrajah worked briefly as an instructor at the Technical College. He joined the Irrigation Department in 1951 as an Assistant Engineer. He was promoted through the ranks and at the age of 50 became Director of Irrigation. He retired on 4 February 1985.

Ponrajah died on 26 January 1986.

In 1988 the Irrigation Department published a book containing a collection of technical notes written by Ponrajah during his career. In 2011 the Irrigation Department Ex-Officers’ Association launched a scholarship named after Ponrajah.
