= Han Vinck =

Dutch academic

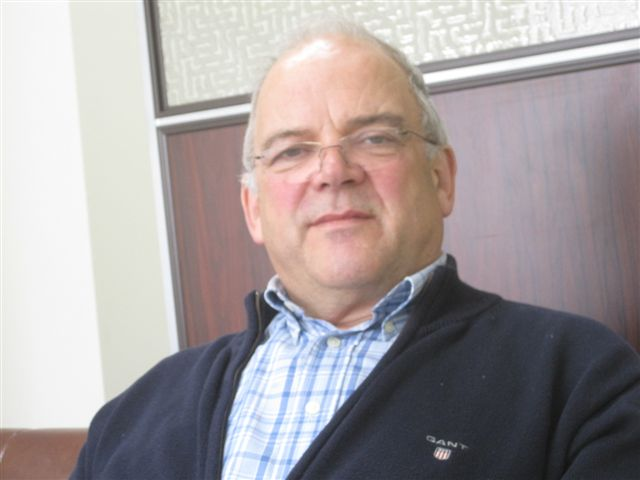
- Born: Adrianus Johannes Vinck; 15 May 1949 (age 77); Breda, Netherland
- Education: Eindhoven University of Technology
- Scientific career
- Fields: Computer Science
- Workplaces: University of Duisburg

Adrianus Johannes "Han" Vinck (born 15 May 1949, in Breda) is a Dutch computer scientist. He serves as senior professor in Digital Communications at the University of Duisburg-Essen, Germany, since September 2014. He is a member of the digital signal processing group at the electrical engineering Department. His interest is in Information and Communication theory, Coding and Network aspects in digital communications. He is the author of the textbook Coding Concepts and Reed-Solomon Codes.

== Early life ==
He earned a PhD at Eindhoven University, the Netherlands (Syndrome Decoding of Convolutional Codes, supervisor: J.P.M. Schalkwijk).

== Academic positions ==
- Visiting scientist at the German Aerospace Center in Oberpfaffenhofen, Germany (1986)
- Full professor in Digital Communications at the University of Duisburg-Essen, Germany (Institute for Experimental Mathematics) (1990-2014)
- Director of the Post-Graduate School on Networking, "CINEMA" (1997-1999)
- Chairman of the Benelux Information and Communication Society (WIC) (1998-2001)
- Chairman for the communication division of the Institute for Critical Infrastructures, CRIS (2000-2004)
- Adjunct professor at the Sun Yat-Sen University in Kaohsiung, Taiwan (2003)
- Visiting professor at the University of Johannesburg, South Africa (2010-2012)
- Consultant professor at the Harbin Institute of Technology, Harbin, China (2011)
- Director of the Institute for Experimental Mathematics in Essen
- Adjunct professor at the National Cheng Kung University Tainan, Taiwan (2014 -2015)
- Honorary professor at the University of Johannesburg, South Africa (2014 -2015)
- President of the Leibniz foundation. This foundation supports research and education in the field of Information theory, Neurosciences and Biology. (2014-)

== Professional activities ==
- In 1990 Vinck organized the IEEE Information Theory workshop in Veldhoven, the Netherlands.
- He served on the Board of Governors of the IEEE Information Theory Society from 1997-2006.
- Vinck is the founding Chairman (1995-1998) of the IEEE German Information theory chapter.
- In 1997 Vinck acted as Co-chairman for the 1997 IEEE Information Theory symposium in Ulm, Germany.
- In 2003 Vinck was elected president of the IEEE Information theory Society.
- 2008, Vinck was a distinguished lecturer for the IEEE Communication Society.

Founded conferences

- Japan-Benelux workshops on Information theory (now Asia-Europe workshop on "Concepts in Information Theory") (1990)
- International Winterschool on Coding, Cryptography and Information theory in Europe (Essen, 1991 and 1993).
- IEEE conferences on Power Line Communications and its Applications, ISPLC. (1997)

== Recognition ==
- IEEE *ISPLC2006 Achievement award in Orlando (FL, USA) for his contributions to Power Line Communications and for facilitating the transition of ISPLC to a fully financially and technically sponsored IEEE Communications Society conference. (2006)
- IEEE fellow for his "Contributions to Coding Techniques" (2006)
- SA-IEE annual award for the best paper published in the SA-IEE Africa Research Journal. (2008)
- Best paper award at Chinacom). 2013)
- Aaron Wyner distinguished service award from the IEEE Information theory society. (2015)

== See also ==
- "Coding Concepts and Reed-Solomon Codes" (PDF). 2015-02-05. Archived from the original (PDF) on 5 February 2015.
- "Home | Information Theory Society". www.itsoc.org.
- "Han Vinck". www.uni-due.de.
