= AJ Faigin =

Sports agent and trial attorney

AJ Faigin (born August 11, 1947, in Cleveland, Ohio) was a prominent sports agent in the 1980s and 1990s, negotiating several landmark professional football contracts. AJ Faigin represented four Football Hall of Fame players (Jack Lambert, Jim Kelly, Mike Webster and Mel Blount) who played in eight Super Bowls; as well as numerous Pro Bowl (all star) selections and First Round Draft Picks. After he left the Cuyahoga County Prosecutor's office (Cleveland, Ohio), where in his twenties he successfully prosecuted major felony cases including homicides, he was asked by a college and law school acquaintance to join Lustig Pro Sports as general counsel. There he became a seasoned negotiator and recruiter for the firm; and known throughout professional football for his creative strategies in the era before Free Agency was won by football players.

== Jim Kelly contract negotiations ==
AJ Faigin became noted in the national news when he signed the Buffalo Bills 1983 draft pick to the USFL Houston Gamblers (the first 1st Round NFL pick to choose the USFL) for a then record setting contract. The deal occurred when after at first merely meeting with USFL Chicago GM Bruce Allen to generate leverage, he and his negotiating partner received a famous return call by Allen to Faigin as they sat in the Bills offices about to finalize an agreement. Allen asked him to immediately fly to Toronto for a midnight meeting with USFL money-men at the home of multi-millionaire and league creative guru John F. Bassett. There they were told they could pick any team in the league.

When the USFL was engaged in its anti-trust trial against the NFL, Kelly, Lustig and AJ Faigin met with Donald Trump after Faigin threatened a lawsuit if Trump would not guarantee Kelly's contract should the USFL fold. Trump, who wanted Kelly for his USFL and a potential NFL franchise threatened his own lawsuit against Faigin, but then capitulated and later signed an agreement.

AJ Faigin then leaked Donald Trump's agreement with Kelly to the media to use as leverage against the Bills should the USFL lose their case. As a direct result Lustig and AJ Faigin signed Kelly to the largest contract in NFL history. The Salary package being 60% higher than the next highest player, Joe Montana.

== Kosar to Cleveland ==
AJ Faigin also created a scheme to get Bernie Kosar, the national championship quarterback from the University of Miami, to his favored team, the Cleveland Browns. The plan involved the infrequently used Supplemental NFL Draft. While it succeeded in getting Kosar to Cleveland, it also caused rare havoc in the NFL with open threats of lawsuits among at least five teams. Faigin later said he got the "Jerry Maguire handshake" from Kosar's father, Bernie Kosar Sr., and officially never represented his son despite the success on Kosar Jr.'s behalf. Kosar went on to lead Cleveland to three AFC Championship games.

== Football strike ==
AJ Faigin, through linebacker Jack Lambert of the Pittsburgh Steelers tried to redirect the NFL players strike of 1982 with his ‘Modest Proposal’ that called for a fight for free agency in lieu of the seniority- based wage scale the union was seeking. Lambert presented this paper at the strike vote meeting but was unable to get the other team player reps to change course.

== Faigin v. Kelly libel action ==
AJ Faigin left Lustig Pro Sports in 1987 but was nonetheless later drawn into a lawsuit against the firm and its founder Greg Lustig over investment decisions and tax shelters recommended by Lustig. Faigin was voluntarily dismissed, but sought monetary sanctions. The Federal Judge held AJ Faigin the victim of “a frivolous suit” awarding $13,000 in Sanctions from Kelly and his attorney for joining him in the first instance, and having knowledge that he was not involved with client investments.

AJ Faigin then brought a libel action against Kelly for false claims in an autobiography that Faigin had advised on investments; however evidence of the Sanctions Award was excluded from evidence and the case was lost. In Faigin v. Kelly (1st Cir.) 184 F.3rd 67, the court of appeals while refusing to address another crucial assignment of error, gave deference to the trial judge's decision to not allow the jury to hear about the Sanctions.

== Law professor, business owner ==
Faigin, in the 1990s, lived in Chicago, wrote and also taught Sports Law and Negotiation at Chicago-Kent Law School (Ill Inst. of Tech.). While there he became involved with the national Bill Clinton campaign for president, going to New Hampshire as well as the 1992 Democratic Convention. He later relocated to California where he became a successful business owner in the convention and trade show industry.
