= A. J. Thomas Jr. =

American politician

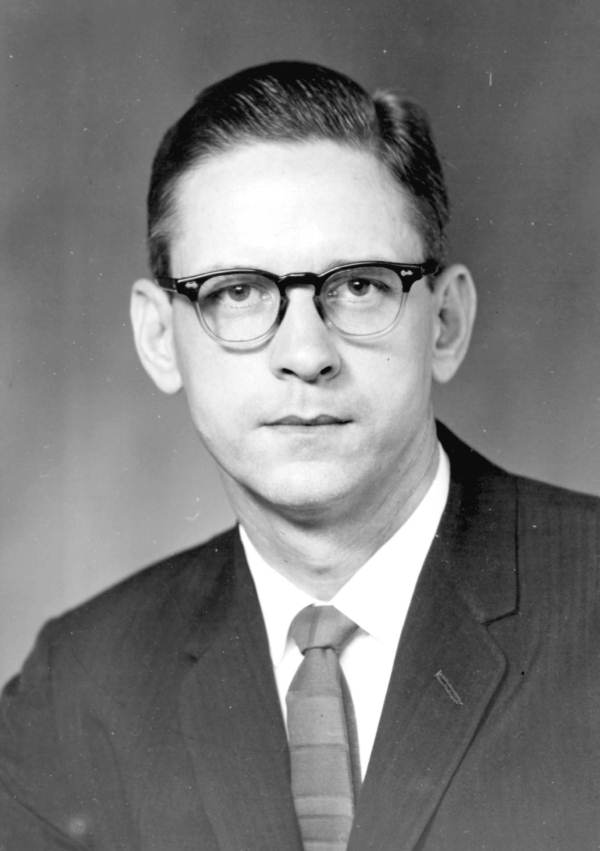

Member of the Florida House of Representatives from Bradford County
- In office 1961–1966
- Preceded by: Doyle Conner
- Succeeded by: Eugene F. Shaw

Personal details
- Born: December 25, 1923 Lake Butler, Florida, U.S.
- Died: December 21, 2004 (aged 80) Florida, United States
- Party: Democratic
- Parent: A. J. Thomas Sr. (father)
- Occupation: attorney

Archibald J. Thomas Jr. (December 25, 1923 – December 21, 2004) was an American politician in the state of Florida. Thomas was born in Lake Butler, Florida, the son of Archibald J. Thomas, also a former member of the Florida House of Representatives. He attended the University of Florida where he earned an LL.B. degree. Thomas served in the Florida House of Representatives from 1961 to 1966, as a Democrat, representing Bradford County. He died on December 21, 2004.
