= AJ Nelson =

Ghanaian recording artist

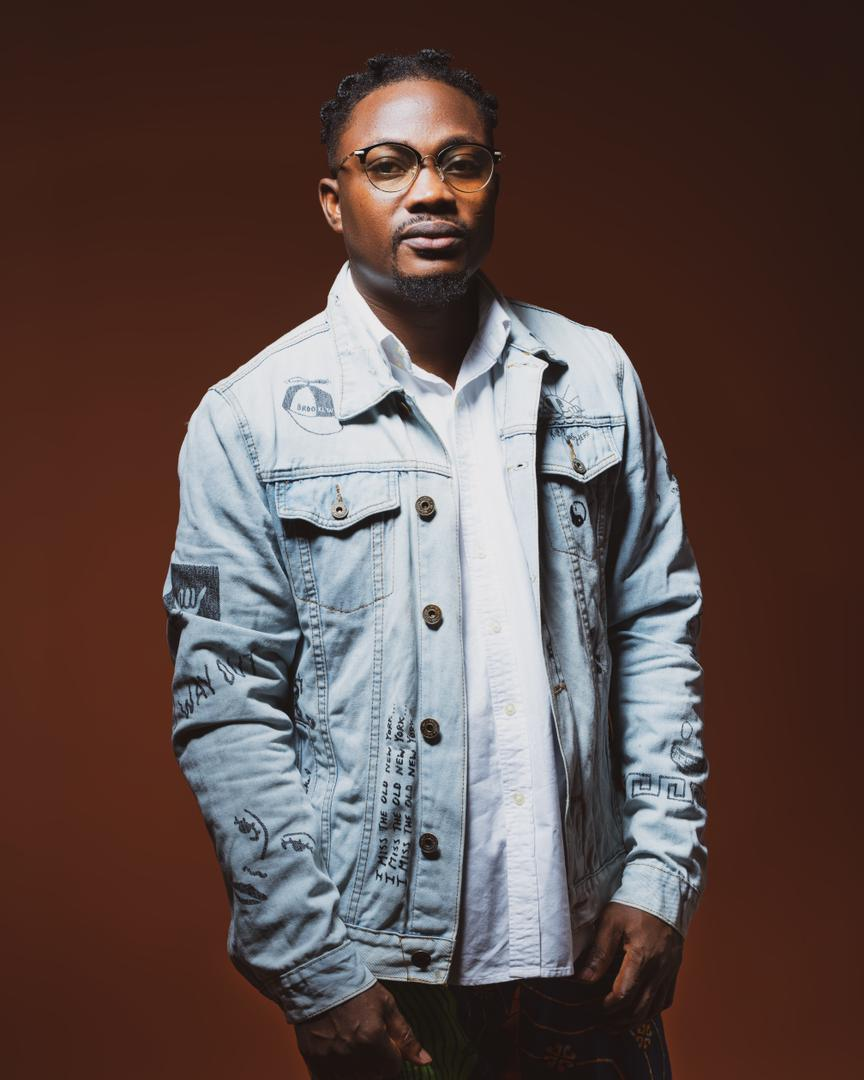
- AJ Nelson in 2023

Background information
- Also known as: AJ Nelson
- Born: Adjei Nelson Otumfour; May 5, 1985 (age 41); Dormaa Ahenkro, Brong Ahafo Region, Ghana
- Genres: Hiplife, Hip hop
- Occupation: Rapper
- Instruments: vocals
- Years active: 2009–present
- Label: Corna Rock Entertainment
- Website: ajnelsonworld.com

Adjei Nelson Otumfour (born 5 May 1985), better known by his stage name AJ Nelson is a Ghanaian recording artist and activist. He is most famous for the singles “Same Girl,” “Faith” and “Power to the People”. He was the first Ghanaian musician to rap in Bono language. In 2015, AJ Nelson released the song titled “Power To the People” and lead a campaign in Ghana to encourage youths not only from Ghana but also from other parts of Africa to speak against the corruption and conflicts the continent is engulfed in and hold their political leaders accountable. According to AJ Nelson, the people most affected need to be empowered to voice their thoughts out to their leaders. The campaign got the attention of top Ghanaian personalities including the renowned Head of Global Parliamentary Engagement at World Bank, Mr. Kofi Tsikata and media personality Berla Mundi who both joined the campaign. In November 2015, the song was ranked the 3rd most downloaded Ghanaian Hiphop Song on iTunes. AJ Nelson was ranked the 3rd top-selling artist on iTunes in November 2015.

== Life and career ==
=== Early life ===
Adjei Nelson Otumfour was born in Dormaa Ahenkro, Brong Ahafo Region of Ghana. He is the 5th of 7 children born to Mrs. Agnes Isha Yeboa Mensah and Mr. Mohammed Amoani Mensah. He attended the Saint Dominic School. He started writing his own songs at age 14 and started performing in High Schools and community shows. AJ Nelson later attended IPMC College of Technology in Accra, where he studied Web & Graphic design.

=== Musical career ===
AJ Nelson first began to gain recognition at the start of 2009 when he featured on a welcome song for the 44th president of the United States of America, Barack Obama's visit to Ghana. The song featured prominently on television channels across Africa. After releasing singles including his debut mainstream hit, “Same Girl” featuring Quabena Maphia in September 2010. He subsequently released a second single titled “Dream” in 2011, which did not have a lot of commercial success compared to its forerunner. In the last quarter of 2011, he released a third single, titled “Faith” featuring Ghanaian-American singer, and songwriter based in New York City, Jay Ghartey. Faith became a major success with the music video enjoying daily airplay on several television channels in Africa including MTV Base. In 2015, AJ Nelson released “Power to the People” featuring Ghanaian international Wiyaala under the label, Corna Rock Entertainment. Power to the people was ranked 3rd on iTunes list of top-selling Ghanaian Hiphop artists alongside fellow rappers Sarkodie and Obrafuor. In November 2015, “Power to the People” was the only Ghanaian song listed in the list of Best New Music of The Week on Wepluggoodmusic.com. AJ Nelson was later nominated as 2016 Ghana Carnival ambassador. In 2019, AJ Nelson became the first Ghanaian rapper to start his own band. He started touring and performing at venues in and out of Accra, the capital city of Ghana. The band is named, Band Afriq, which literally means Band of Africa. AJ Nelson has collaborated with artists from different parts of the world including AJ Omo Alaja from Nigeria, Nelson Manora from Congo Brazzaville, Valentine Alvares from Togo/France, and O'hene Savant from the United States. He has also worked with Kesse, Jupiter, Epixode, Tinny, Richie Mensah, Worlasi, Edem, and Ayat.

== Album ==
In October 2018, AJ Nelson announced his debut album titled "Africa Rise" The album, which consists of sixteen tracks, featured Ghanaian acts, Cabum, Che Che, Worlasi, Ayat, Kliff Wonder and Guinea's Miking on Marafagni which literally means Love. The album was recorded live and emphasized the messages of Peace, Love, Hope and togetherness . The 16 tracks album was officially released on November 23.

=== Album Tracklist ===
- "Kwanto" ft Kliff Wonder
- "Forward" ft Worlasi
- "Brother" feat. Cheche & Suzzy Blaq (Prod. by Cheche)
- "How Come" feat. Ohene Savant (Prod. by Cheche)
- "I No Go Lie" (Prod. by Ohene Savant)
- "Africa Rise" feat. Suzzy Blaq (Prod. by Genius Selection)
- "Beautiful" feat. Jay Smalls (Prod. by Cheche)
- "Marafagni (Love)" feat. Miking (Prod. by Cheche)
- "I Pray" feat. Ayat (Prod. by Shizzy)
- "Bibia" feat. Dee Tutu (Prod. by Azee Burner)
- "Tomorrow" (Prod. by Cheche)
- "Weytin" feat. Cabum, De’ Lion & Lala (Prod. by Cabum)
- "Mansa Ba" feat. Cheche (Prod. by Ohene Savant)
- "V.O.A" (Prod. by Cheche)
- "Message" (Prod. by Azee Burner)
- "I Dey Here" (Prod. by Cheche)

== Personal life ==
AJ Nelson is married to Salome Nelson Adjei since 2015.

== Performance ==
AJ Nelson has performed at the Afrobeat festival where he shared the stage with Lauren Hill, Edem, EL, M.anifest, Uncle Ebo Tailor, AB Crentsil, Okyeame Kwame, and Wiyaala. He also performed at the Asabaako festival, one of the biggest festivals in West Africa, and the Sabolai radio festival. He has performed at 4 Syte Music Video Awards, the maiden Ghana Fashion Awards, and Sarkodie's Rapperholic album launch. AJ Nelson also joined on Okyeame Kwame's "OK in Your Zone" tour and on his “Clinic” album launch.

== Discography ==
Year	Song/Album	Ref
2022	GuyGuy	
2016	Power To The People Featuring Wiyaala	
2015	Pain	
