= A. J. W. Dawson =

- Born: assume Tyneside
- Died: assume Tyneside
- Occupations: English singer and songwriter

A. J. W. Dawson was a Tyneside singer/songwriter and performer in the late 19th and early 20th century.

He wrote and performed a work titled “A Record Run” at a special dinner given by Wilson Worsdell Esq. J.P. M.I.M.E. to the retired officials and engine drivers of the N.E.R. Co., in Gateshead, on 11, February 1910

The song belongs to a small group of North East humorous railway songs (remembering that the area was the birthplace of the Railways) and describes a journey from South Shields to Newcastle

A. J. W. Dawson published a six-page chapbook titled “A Record Run”, printed by the Tyne Printing Works Limited, a copy of which is held in the archives of Gateshead Council

== See also ==
- Geordie dialect words
