= Eugene F. Shaw =

American politician

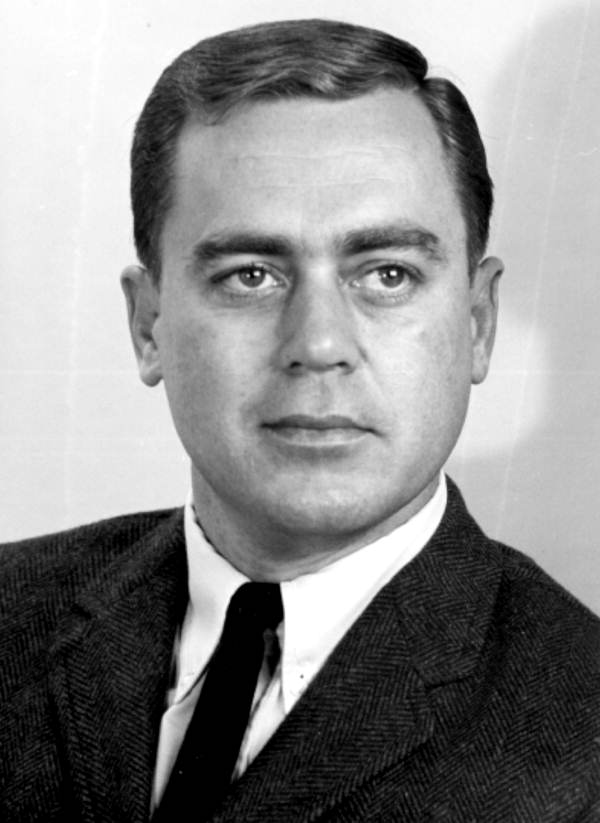

Member of the Florida House of Representatives from the 16th district
- In office 1966–1972

Personal details
- Born: June 14, 1935 Raiford, Florida, U.S.
- Died: June 3, 2005 (aged 69)
- Party: Republican
- Education: University of Florida School of Law, University of Georgia School of Law
- Occupation: attorney

Eugene F. Shaw (June 14, 1935 – June 3, 2005), was a politician in the American state of Florida. He served in the Florida House of Representatives from 1966 to 1972, representing the 16th district.

Shaw died on June 3, 2005, at the age of 69.
