= AJ Dixon =

Motorcycle pioneer and racing driver

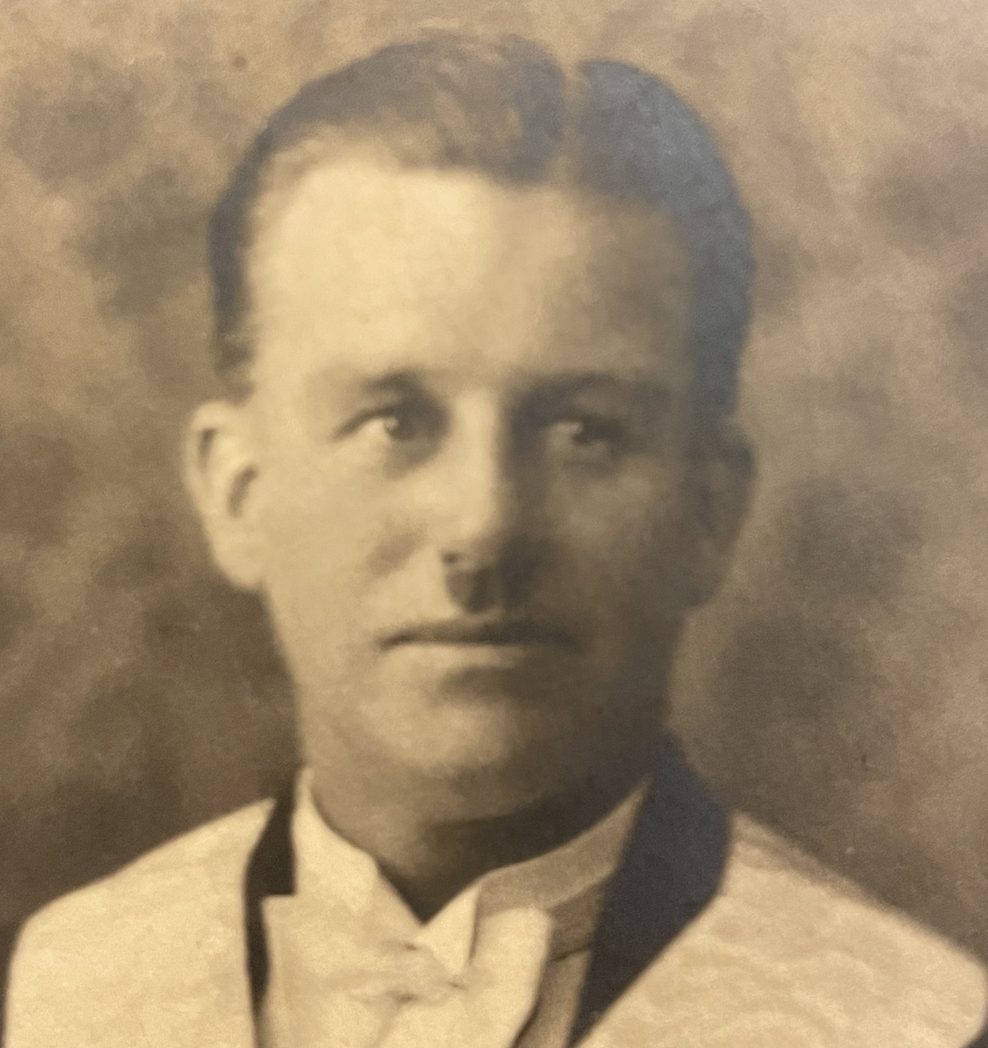
- Born: Alfred James Dixon; 21 October 1886; St Pancras, London
- Died: 21 March 1935 (aged 48); Frinton-on-Sea, Essex
- Occupations: Motorcycle and cyclecar racing

Alfred James Dixon (1886–1935) was a British racing driver.

== Early life ==
Dixon was born on 21 October 1886 in St Pancras as the son of Alfred Archer Dixon, a publican, and Fanny Law, daughter of Richard Law. Richard was the publican of the Hare and Hounds in Layer Breton and had fought at the Battle of Sevastopol during the Crimea War on board HMS Rodney. Educated at The Ongar Academy, he completed an apprenticeship with a railway company.

After leaving school, his father helped him establish a career in motorcycle racing. His father died in 1914.

When war broke out in August 1914, he tried to join the Royal Flying Corps, but he later joined the army as a dispatch rider. He served in France in the 101 (City of London) Engineer Regiment in September 1915 but was discharged on 4 May 1916, believed to be injured. He was awarded the Victory, British and Star medals.

On his return to England, he worked for Singer as an engineer in Coventry. Here, he met and subsequently married Gertrude Annie Elkington. They had two children: Nora and Alfred Patrick John (Paddy), who were born in Coventry. They moved from Coventry to Enfield, where he was the licensee of the White House pub, and their third child was born, Phyllis Mary. Dixon became a Freemason at Thobalds Lodge, then grandmaster. After the Depression, they bought a confectionery business in Clacton-on-Sea, on the site of the old Mazzolini's cafe, and called it the Criterion.

== Career ==
=== Motorcycling career ===
Dixon competed in many events in England, France and the UK winning medals. Atkinson in his book, The Singer Story, said that "in 1912, the most successful rider was G. E. Stanley". Some of the known events that he competed in include:

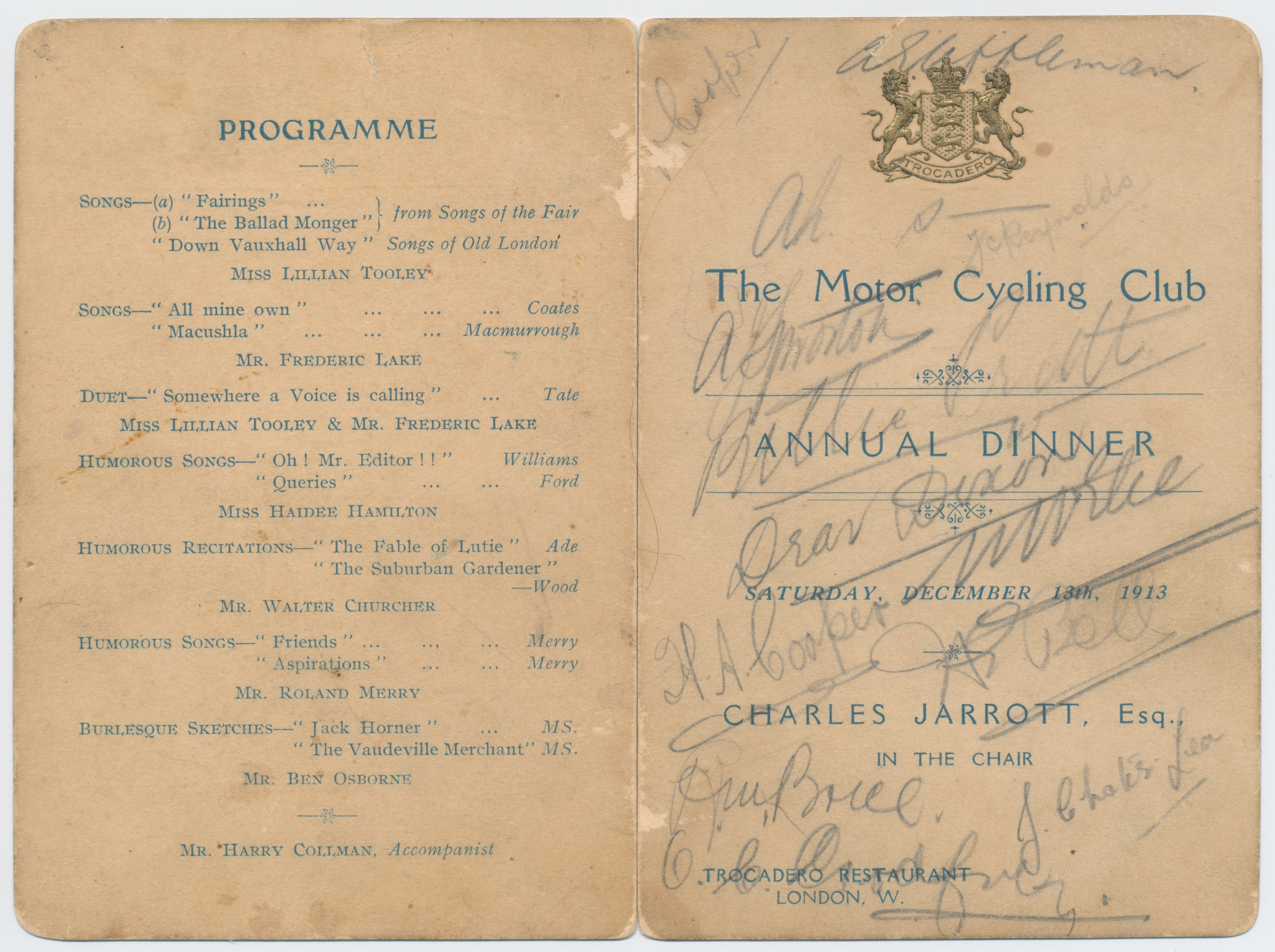
Motorcycle Club AGM 1913, front

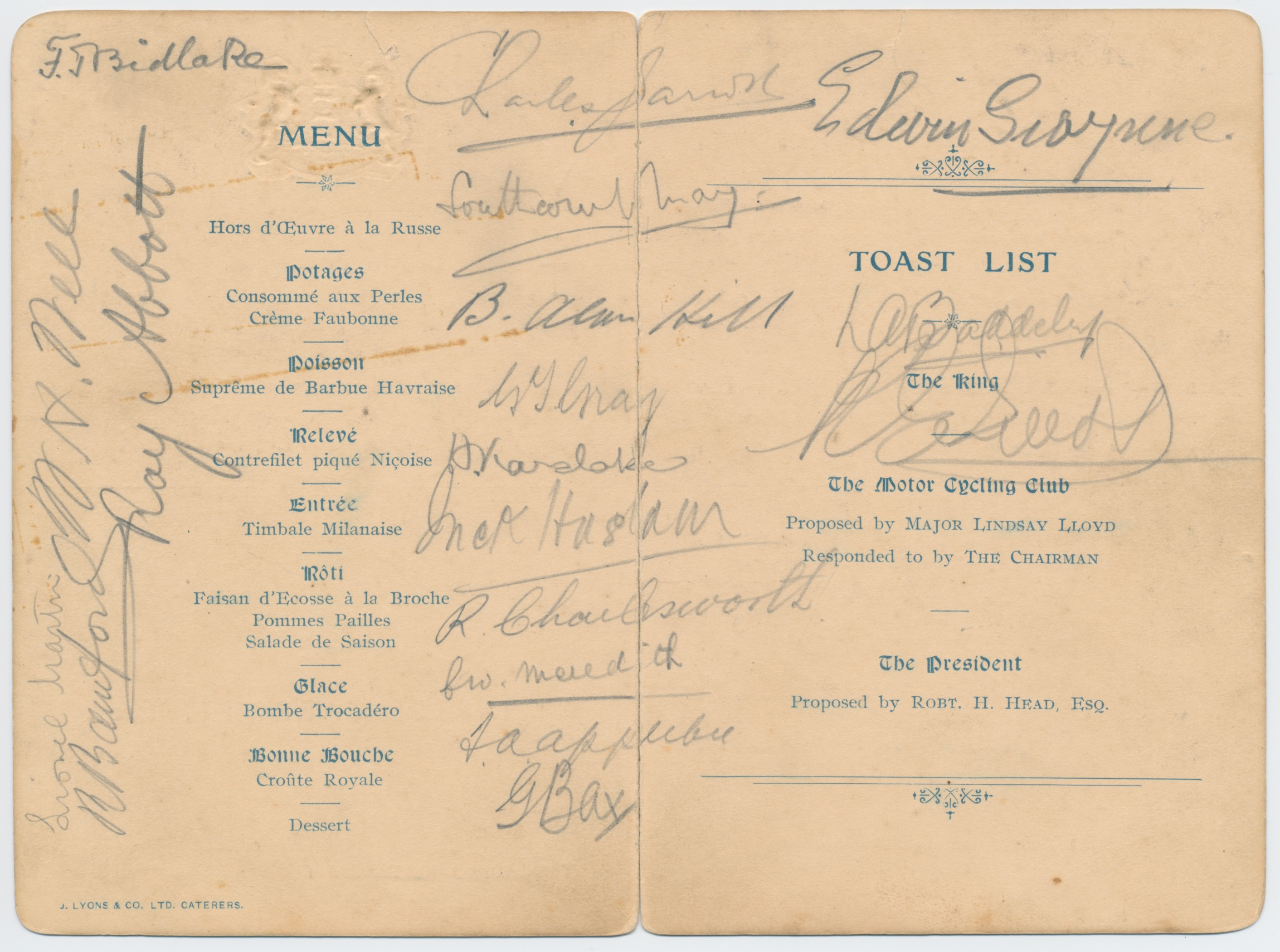
Motorcycle Club AGM 1913, inside

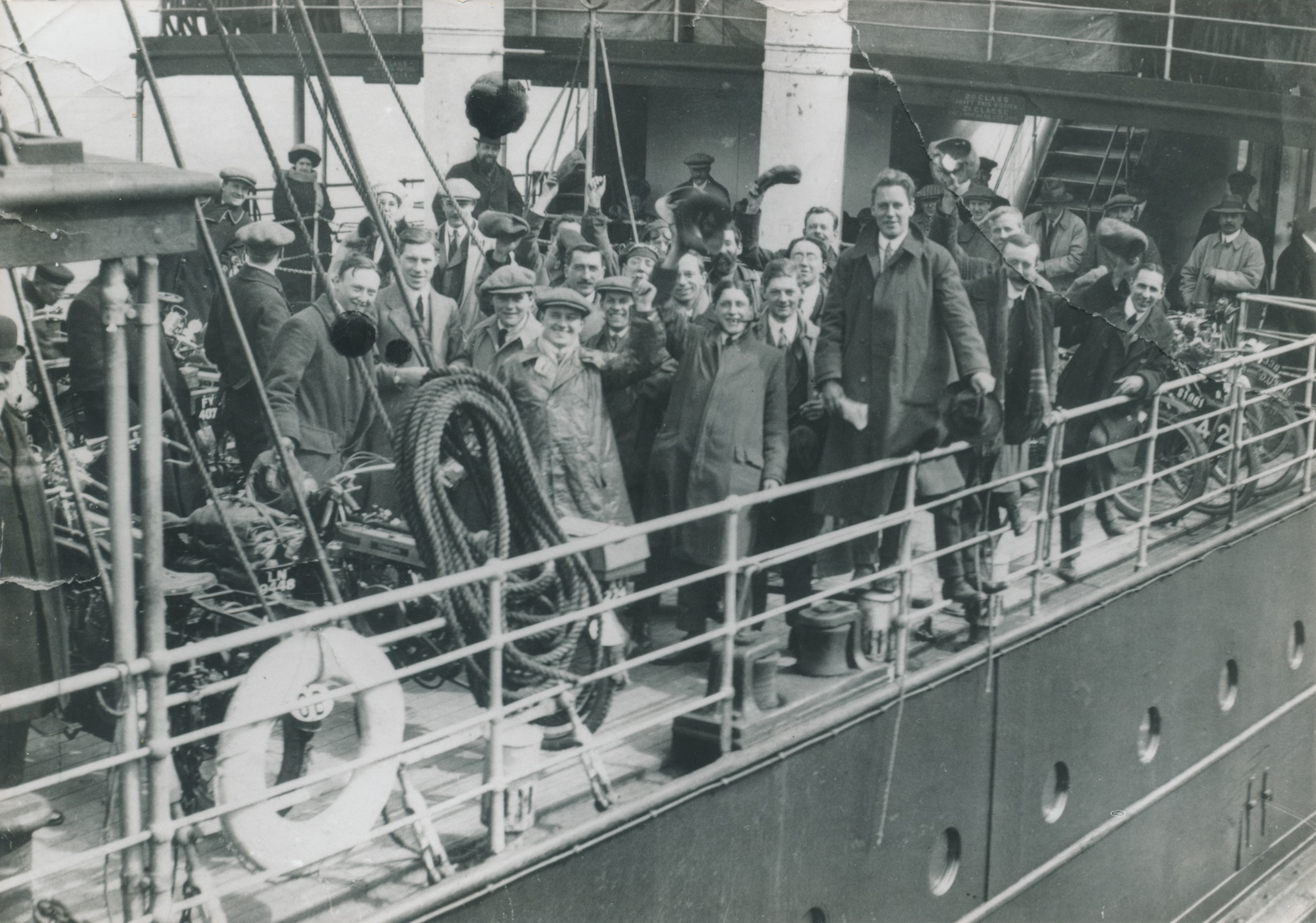
Heading to France

- 1912—Gaillon Hill Climb in France
- 1913—Bristol Motorcycle & Motor Club: Open Hill Climb, Scottish Six days Trial July and Speed Trials at Colwyn Bay
- 1914—Nice, Monte Carlo Trial. He won a cup. Midland Cycling and Athletic Club 24 hour trial race. He also took part in the Herts County in January, riding a Rudge.
- 1924—Dixon competed in the Midland Cycling and Athletic Clun

Dixon was a member of the Motor Cycling Club and attended their 1913 Annual Dinner that was held at the Trocadero Restaurant.

=== Cyclecar career ===
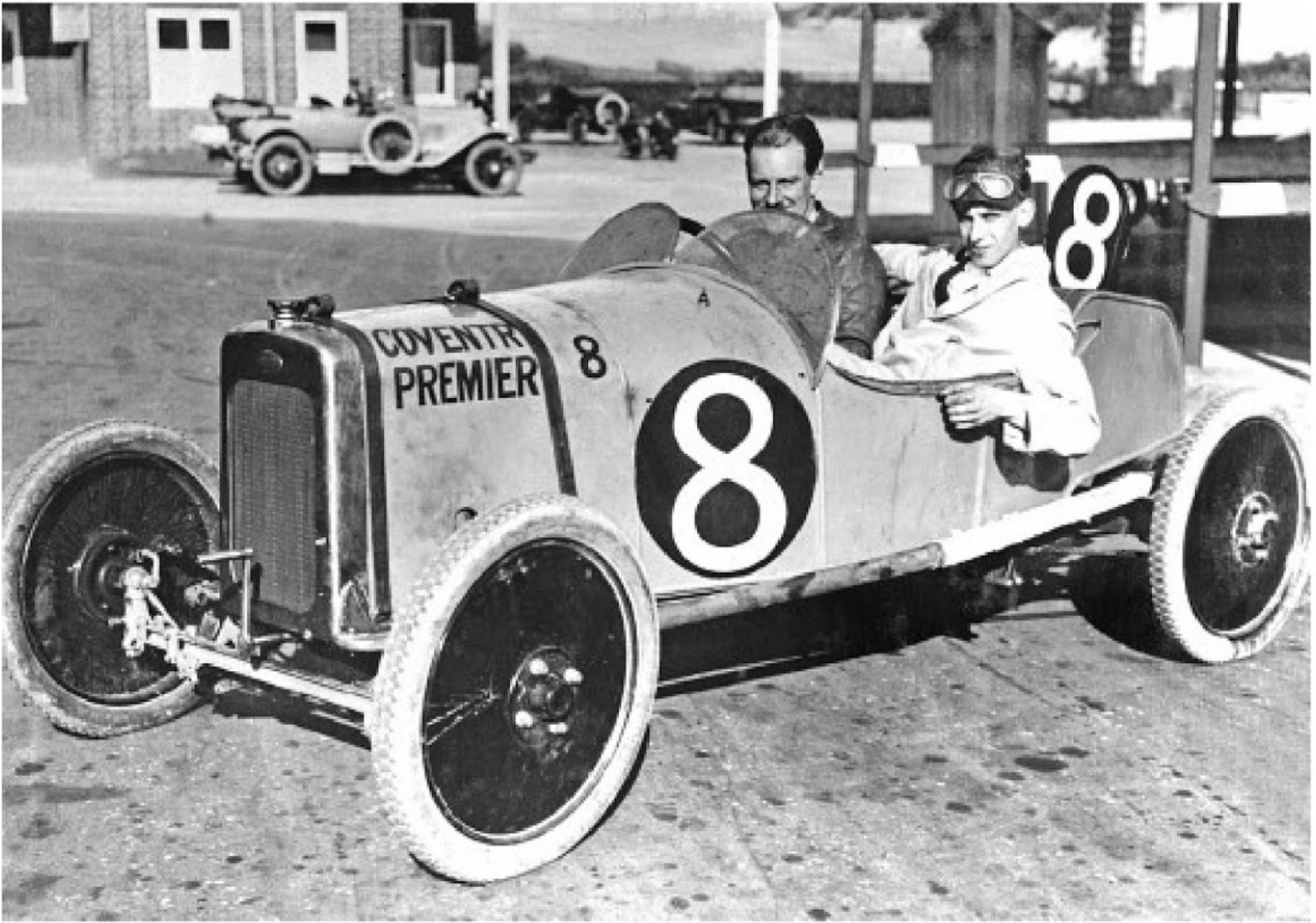
AJ Dixon and Bicknell at the start of the JCC 200 Mile race at Brooklands on 22 October 1921.

Dixon joined the Cyclecar Club, and he bought his own car—a Coventry Premier, made by Singer. In 1921, Dixon took part in London's Land's End Trial in his Singer 10HP. This was the only Singer in the race. The 1921 Midlands Light Car Club 1-day Reliability Trial was held on 23 April 1912. Dixon and his friend and mechanic, R. Croucher, entered in a Coventry Premier three-wheeler. Dixon received a silver medal. Dixon finished 4th in his class at the JCC 200 Mile race at Brooklands on 22 October 1921.

Atkinson mistakenly identified another Singer's entry as that of the Coventry Premier driven by Arthur (which should read Alfred) Dixon. Dixon's car has a number 8 for the race. Goodwin was the mechanic for Dixon. Dixon finished in fourth place at an average speed of 55 mph. Austin Harris has a photo of Dixon leading the chase up. Atkinson believes that the Austin Harris photo is of Dixon's car. In 1922, both Dixon and Croucher entered the Land's End Trial event with their Coventry Premiers. Dixon did not manage to finish. In 1923, Atkinson wrote that Dixon drove a 10 hp Singer and Bicknell a 10 hp Coventry Premier during The Colmore Cup:

Both made good climbs up such tests as Sainsbury Hill and it was not until they reached Rising Sun Hill that they had problems. On this hill (the most severe test of all the hills) they had to do a stop and restart test. In all Dixon stopped four times but managed to get away with assistance, whereas Bicknell stopped and had to be pushed to restart. As a result, Dixon was awarded the silver medal and Bicknell had to be satisfied with a bronze.

In 1924, Dixon was unable to finish Land's End Trial as his Singer 10 sheared a key in the rear axle on the start line in Slough. He later competed in the RAC Small Car Trial with two cars to be driven by Dixon and Bicknell. At the last minute, both cars were withdrawn shortly before the race, with no explanation.

== Later life ==
Dixon retired from professional racing in 1924 to focus on running the family confectioners shop in Clacton-on-Sea. He was a close friend of Alan Cobham and took part in Sir Alan Cobham's Flying Circus.

Dixon joined the Clacton Chamber of Commerce and was appointed president in 1931. Dixon was a chain smoker and consumed alcohol. He later developed stomach cancer. He died on 21 March 1935 in Frinton and is buried at Kirby Cross cemetery.
