= A. J. Gillbo =

American politician (1858–1919)

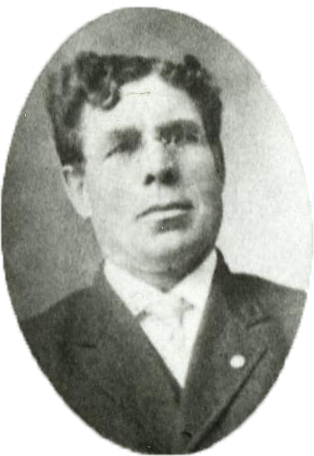
- Gillbo in 1913

Member of the Washington House of Representatives for the 39th district
- In office 1913–1915

Personal details
- Born: January 1858 Norway
- Died: November 17, 1919 (aged 61) Tacoma, Washington, United States
- Party: Progressive

Anton J. Gillbo (January 1858 – November 17, 1919) was an American politician in the state of Washington. He served in the Washington House of Representatives. He was elected as a Progressive in 1912, alongside G. J. Langford. He was killed in a car accident in 1919.
