= A. J. Riebli =

American voice actor and producer

- Born: August 27, 1969 (age 56)
- Occupations: Voice actor, producer

A. J. Riebli (born August 27, 1969) is an American voice actor and producer.

== Actor ==
- The Incredibles (2004) (Additional Voices)
- Cars (2006) (Additional Voices)
- Minecraft: Story Mode (2015) (Death Bowl Announcer)

== Filmography ==
- Toy Story 2 (1999) (Production Office Coordinator) (Uncredited)
- Finding Nemo (2003) (Unit Manager: Schooling & Flocking)
- Ratatouille (2007) (Editorial Manager)
