= AJ Perez (motivational speaker) =

Filipino motivational speaker

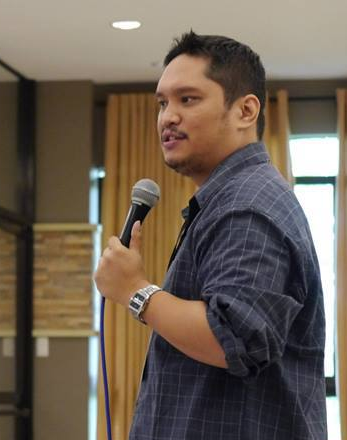
- Perez giving a talk to students
- Born: Alwyne Jan Calinao Perez; April 20, 1981 (age 45); Parañaque, Metro Manila, Philippines
- Education: University of the Philippines Manila
- Known for: Writer, Motivational Speaker, Corporate Trainer, Vlogger, Radio Broadcaster
- Spouse: Arlene Perez (m. 2018)
- Website: ajperez.ph

Alwyne Jan Calinao Perez (Tagalog pronunciation: [ˈpɛrɛs]; born 20 April 1981) is a Filipino corporate facilitator, blogger, and motivational speaker. He is known for his humorous and direct writing style and his works are often about politics, current events, love and relationships, and life advice.

He is currently residing in Davao City where he spends majority of his time giving retreats and corporate seminars. He has also served as a consultant to various companies and educational institutions. He is the 2013 Globe Tatt Pilipinas "Blogger Phenom" of the year for Davao City.

He is cited as one of the "10 Filipino Motivational Speakers Making an Impact to Watch in 2027" by Voice of ASEAN - an international website catering the ASEAN region.

He was a guest lecturer teaching social science subjects to pre-dentistry students from the Davao Medical School Foundation Inc (DMSFI) and a broadcaster for DXGN 89.9 FM in Davao City.

== Education ==
Perez went to the University of the Philippines Manila (UPM) where he studied in the Organizational Communication program. Prior to his stay in UPM, he earned some units in Philosophy while briefly staying in a seminary that is run by the Rogationist Fathers in Parañaque.

== Career as a Motivational Speaker and Corporate Facilitator ==
He began his speaking career as a lay preacher giving retreats and spiritual talks for schools and companies around Davao City. He was then was then invited to become a preacher and builder for "The Feast" (a weekly event held by the Light of Jesus Family founded by Bo Sanchez) all over Mindanao.

He has since become a corporate speaker and facilitator in the Philippines, giving motivational talks, leadership seminars, team-building sessions, and keynote presentations for corporations, government agencies, organizations, and schools.

He has been recognized by as one of the "10 Filipino Motivational Speakers Making an Impact to Watch in 2027" alongside other prominent motivational speakers in the country.

== Career as a Radio Broadcaster ==
He was a broadcaster for DXGN 89.9 Spirit FM managed by the Roman Catholic Archdiocese of Davao hosting two shows, "Jamming at GN" a youth oriented radio show and "Coach Notes" an advice giving radio program where he and his wife, Arlene give life advices to callers and letter senders.

== Blogging ==
Perez first gained national prominence as a blogger when his article,"Dear Ex ni Janine Tugonon" went viral. This article was his humorous take regarding the relationship woes of Miss Universe 2012 first runner-up Janine Tugonon and her boyfriend Jaypee Santos. In just the span of two days, the article spread nationwide attention having almost a million readers and was re-posted to various social networking sites such as Facebook and Twitter and gained traction from there as well. This viral post was even posted by the Philippines' major TV networks, ABS-CBN and GMA Network.

A month later, Perez again made the news when his blog post, "Dear Kuyang Taiwanese" ("Dear Taiwanese Elder Brother") went viral over social media sites. This article was Perez' way to defend Filipino migrant workers who were abused in Taiwan as a result of the standoff between the two countries over a territorial dispute.

During the Social Media Day celebrations in the Philippines, Globe Telecom awarded Perez to be the first Globe Tatt Pilipinas Awards "Blogger Phenom" for Davao City. The amount of the readers and followers he has on his blog made him to be considered as one of the precursors of being a Filipino "social media influencer" when the concept of being an influencer or a content creator has yet to exist a couple of years later.

His article "Because I Fell in Love Here in Davao" written as his homage for Davao City in time for the Kadayawan 2013 celebrations gained attention on social media among readers in Davao City. Also, during the height of the Priority Development Assistance Fund scam in the Philippines, many of Perez' articles that poked fun on those involved in the scam went viral on social media as well.

== Filmography ==
Television

Year	Title	Role
2016	Salitang Buhay	Guest
2017	7 Last Words	Preacher, Fifth Word
