= AJ Mediratta =

American investor

Ajata "AJ" Mediratta
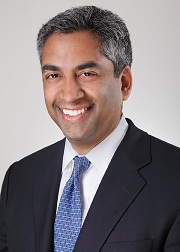
- Born: Buffalo, New York, US
- Education: Williams College; Columbia Business School
- Occupation: Investment Advisor
- Employer: Greylock Capital Management
- Known for: Emerging markets, Sovereign debt

Ajata "AJ" Mediratta is an American investor who has worked in financial markets, particularly in fixed income emerging markets and in sovereign debt restructurings. He is a president at Greylock Capital Management, LLC (Greylock Capital), an alternative asset investment adviser. Mediratta is active in Greylock Capital's investment activity and debt restructuring efforts globally.

== Early life ==
Mediratta was born in Buffalo, New York and spent his childhood in Huntington, New York. He has a brother and 2 sisters, one of whom is his twin. He graduated from the Choate Rosemary Hall school and subsequently enrolled at Williams College, where he completed a Bachelor of Arts degree in economics. He went on to earn an MBA in Finance and International Business from Columbia Business School. Mediratta received his CFA Charter in 1995.

== Career ==
Following Williams College, Mediratta worked for the Export–Import Bank of the United States in Washington DC before enrolling and earning an MBA at Columbia Business School. He began a career in investment banking, working successively for The Weston Group, Credit Lyonnais Securities and Bear Stearns. Mediratta joined Greylock Capital upon the conclusion of Bear Stearns' merger with JP Morgan.

Mediratta chaired the creditor committee for an investor group working to restructure a large portion of the outstanding US$544 million sovereign debt of the nation of Belize. The Belize sovereign debt restructuring was noteworthy because it demonstrated how sovereign borrowers and commercial creditors can reach an amicable agreement without recourse to lawsuits. For this and for several other innovations in the deal, the Belize restructuring deal was awarded Latin Finance's 2013 Deal of the Year in the Restructuring category.

Mediratta chaired the creditor committee restructuring the $220 million debt of Panama's Trump Ocean Club Project. He also represented Greylock Capital on the US$193.5 million sovereign debt restructuring of the nation of Grenada. The Grenada deal was considered an innovative sovereign restructuring because it offered debt relief for the nation while also allowing creditors to participate in revenue growth. He also co-chaired the October 2019 restructuring of $7bn in Barbados sovereign debt. Both the Grenada and Barbados restructurings included hurricane clauses which permit payment relief in the event of future natural disasters.

Mediratta represented Greylock Capital as part of a creditor committee formed to negotiate a restructuring of Suriname's $675 million in loans. The Suriname restructuring concluded successfully in mid-2023.

He represents Greylock Capital on debt restructuring committees for Zambia, Ghana, and represents Greylock Capital on the ad-hoc restructuring committee for Sri Lanka.

Mediratta is on the board of directors of the Emerging Markets Investor Alliance, an entity that enables institutional emerging market investors to support good governance, promote sustainable development, and improve investment performance in the governments and companies in which they invest. He previously sat on the board of directors of the UTC North American Fund of the Unit Trust Corporation, a financial services company operating in Trinidad and Tobago.

== Personal life ==
Mediratta is married and lives in Manhattan with his wife and three children.
