= A. J. Beirens =

Belgian radio producer (1947–2020)

Albert J. Beirens (May 1947 – 25 June 2020) was a Belgian radio producer and journalist.

== Early life ==
Beirens was born in Bruges in May 1947.

== Career ==
In the 1970s, Beirens was a radio producer at various pirate stations, including Radio North Sea International and Radio Atlantis, which were legal radio stations that broadcast from a ship Mebo II in the North Sea. For nearly 4 years, every Sunday morning, A. J. Beirens broadcast the radio show "NorthSea Goes Dx" in several languages to thousands of listeners. For more than 30 years, he worked for the BBC and the VRT, the national Flemish broadcasting station, as a correspondent. He also worked for Radio Nova in Italy, Radio Paradijs (Knokke-Heist), Radio Dynamo, ORO Nieuwsdienst and VRT. He was a radio correspondent for Zeebrugge and Knokke-Heist. As a maritime journalist, AJ Beirens specialized in news about the port of Zeebrugge and the English Channel. He wrote several books including one about the refugee problems during World War II. A. J. Beirens supported the French branch of the free radio campaign called "Offshore Echo's France" since 1974.

In May 2020, his health deteriorated. He opted for euthanasia and died on 25 June 2020 at age 73.
