= A. J. Lockhart =

American baseball player

- Third baseman
- Born: April 15, 1898; Thomasville, Georgia, U.S.
- Died: June 25, 1986 (aged 88); Atlanta, Georgia, U.S.
- Batted: Right Threw: Right

Negro league baseball debut
- 1925, for the Wilmington Potomacs

Last appearance
- 1925, for the Wilmington Potomacs
- Stats at Baseball Reference

Teams
- Wilmington Potomacs (1925)

Adolphus Joseph Lockhart (April 15, 1898 – June 25, 1986) was an American Negro league third baseman in the 1920s.

A native of Thomasville, Georgia, Lockhart attended Howard University and Morris Brown College. He played for the Wilmington Potomacs in 1925. Lockhart died in Atlanta, Georgia in 1986 at the age of 88.
