= Banquet camera =

Type of camera

A banquet camera is a type of large format camera used in the early 20th century for photographing large groups of people in formal occasions.

== Specifications ==
The film format of banquet cameras were of narrow aspect ratio, with formats of 7x17 in. and 12x20 in. being common. The large, wide negatives were ideal for fitting everyone around a table in a recognizable way. Their use died out as enlarging smaller formats became more popular , wide angle lens use increased, and the snapshot aesthetic became acceptable to record even highly formal events.

== Use today ==
While a few photographers today use banquet cameras for their original purpose, their most common use today is for landscape or architectural photography.
