= A. J. Smith (writer) =

British fantasy writer

A. J. (Tony) Smith is a British fantasy author, known for his The Long War series of dark fantasy novels. His books are published by Head of Zeus, an independent publishing house set up in 2012 by established publisher Anthony Cheetham, and has been reviewed by SciFiNow.

== Bibliography ==
=== The Long War series ===
- The Black Guard (2013, Head of Zeus: ISBN 978-1781855621)
- The Dark Blood (2014, Head of Zeus: ISBN 978-1781852262)
- The Red Prince (2015, Head of Zeus: ISBN 978-1784080860)
- The World Raven (2016, Head of Zeus: ISBN 978-1784080907)

=== Form & Void ===
- The Glass Breaks (2019, Head of Zeus: ISBN 978-1786696885)
- The Sword Falls (2021, Head of Zeus: ISBN 978-1786696922)
- The Sea Rises (2022, Head of Zeus: ISBN 978-1786696960)
