= A. J. Beck =

United States Air Force general

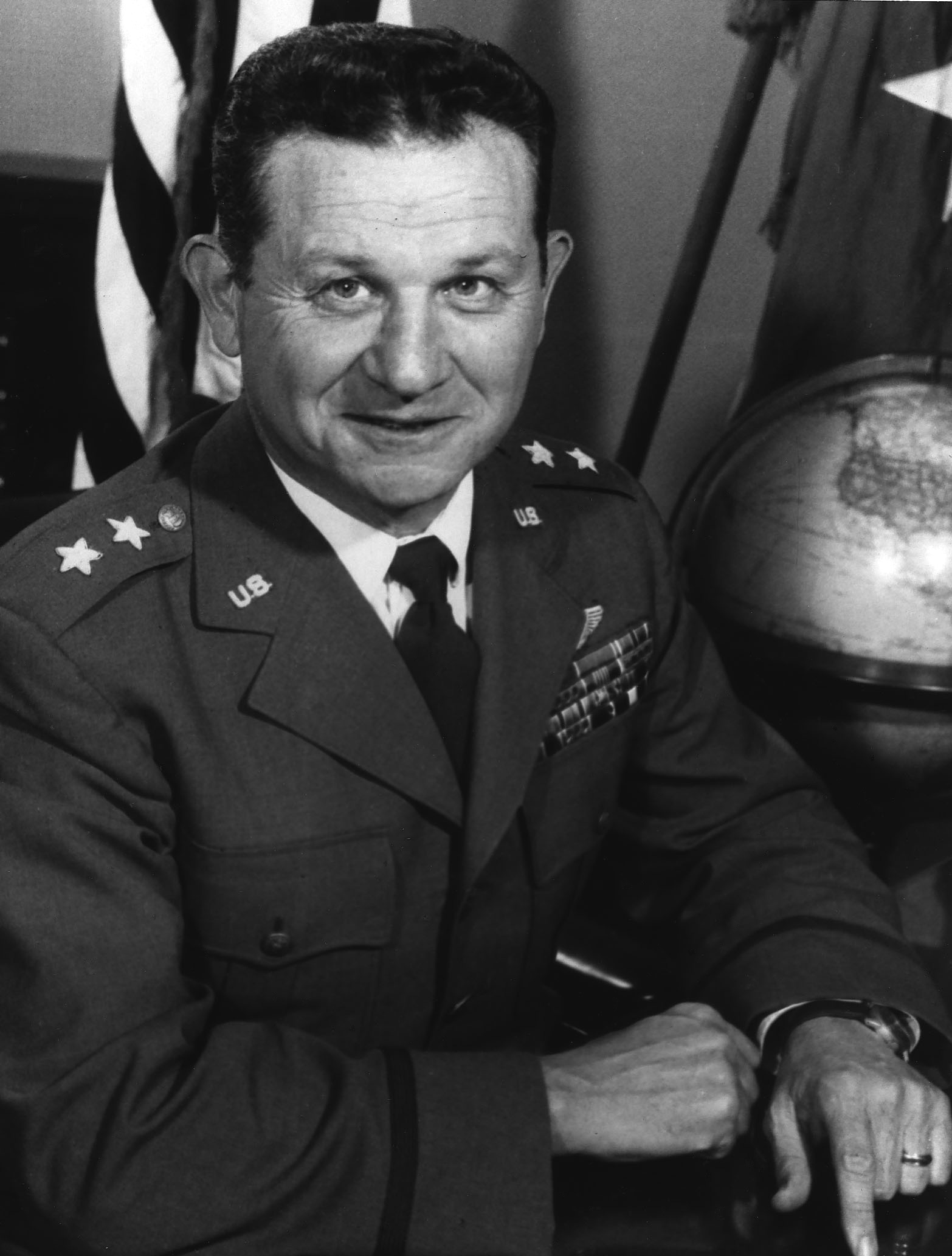
- Born: May 24, 1914; Dallas, Texas
- Died: July 2, 2006 (aged 92); Dallas, Texas
- Military career
- Allegiance: United States of America
- Branch: United States Air Force
- Service years: 1941–1972
- Rank: Major general
- Commands: Warner Robins Air Materiel Area, Air Force Logistics Command
- Awards: Legion of Merit with three oak leaf clusters, Distinguished Flying Cross, Air Medal with three oak leaf clusters, Army Commendation Medal, Presidential Unit Citation Emblem with three oak leaf clusters, and British Military Cross

Abe Jack Beck (May 24, 1914 – July 2, 2006) was an American air force major general who was commander of Warner Robins Air Materiel Area, Air Force Logistics Command, with headquarters at Robins Air Force Base, Georgia.

Beck was born in Dallas, Texas, in 1914, where he received his basic education. He graduated with a bachelor of laws degree from Southern Methodist University, Dallas School of Law in 1939. After a year of private law practice, he enlisted in the Army Air Corps as an aviation cadet and in August 1941 was awarded his pilot wings and commission as second lieutenant at Luke Field, Arizona.

He remained at Luke Field as an instructor pilot, engineering officer, and aide-de-camp to Lieutenant General Ennis C. Whitehead. During World War II in June 1942 he was ordered to duty in the Southwest Pacific Theater of Operations where he served three years, principally as an air operations officer at group, wing and Air Force level. During the campaigns in New Guinea, Netherlands East Indies and the Philippines, Beck flew 133 combat missions in bomber, fighter, and troop carrier aircraft. While piloting a P-38 Lightning fighter, he shot down one enemy aircraft.

Beck returned from overseas in May 1945 to enter the Army Command and General Staff School at Fort Leavenworth, Kansas. He graduated from the course in August and was assigned to Headquarters Fourth Air Force in San Francisco, California. He served there until his release from active military duty in August 1946.

In July 1947 Beck returned to active duty at Carswell Air Force Base, Texas, with Headquarters Eighth Air Force. This was the beginning of a pioneering series of key staff and command assignments in the Strategic Air Command spanning a 19-year period. In August 1948 he was transferred to Headquarters Strategic Air Command at Andrews Air Force Base, Maryland, as judge advocate; and in November 1948, he moved with the headquarters to Offutt Air Force Base, Nebraska, still serving as judge advocate. From January 1952 to July 1954, he was deputy commander and then commander of the 3902d Air Base Wing at Offutt Air Force Base.

The next three years he was at Whiteman Air Force Base, Missouri, as commander of SAC's 340th Bombardment Wing, a B-47 organization. In July 1957 Beck was assigned as commander, 4082d Strategic Wing at Goose Air Base, Labrador; and in July 1959 he became chief of staff for Headquarters Eighth Air Force at Westover Air Force Base, Massachusetts. In July 1961 he moved to Pease Air Force Base, New Hampshire, as commander of the 817th Air Division.

In August 1963 Beck was assigned to Headquarters SAC as inspector general, and in August 1964 he became director of materiel. He assumed duties in September 1966 as senior Air Force member, Military Studies and Liaison Division, Weapons Systems Evaluation Group, Office of the Director of Defense Research and Engineering, Office of the Secretary of Defense.

Beck was assigned in July 1968 as commander of the Warner Robins Air Materiel Area at Robins Air Force Base, Georgia.

His military decorations include the Legion of Merit with three oak leaf clusters, Distinguished Flying Cross, Air Medal with three oak leaf clusters, Army Commendation Medal, Presidential Unit Citation Emblem with three oak leaf clusters, and British Military Cross.

He was promoted to the temporary grade of major general effective October 1, 1963, with date of rank May 3, 1959. He retired January 8, 1972.
