= A. J. Thomas (American football) =

American football player (born 1999)

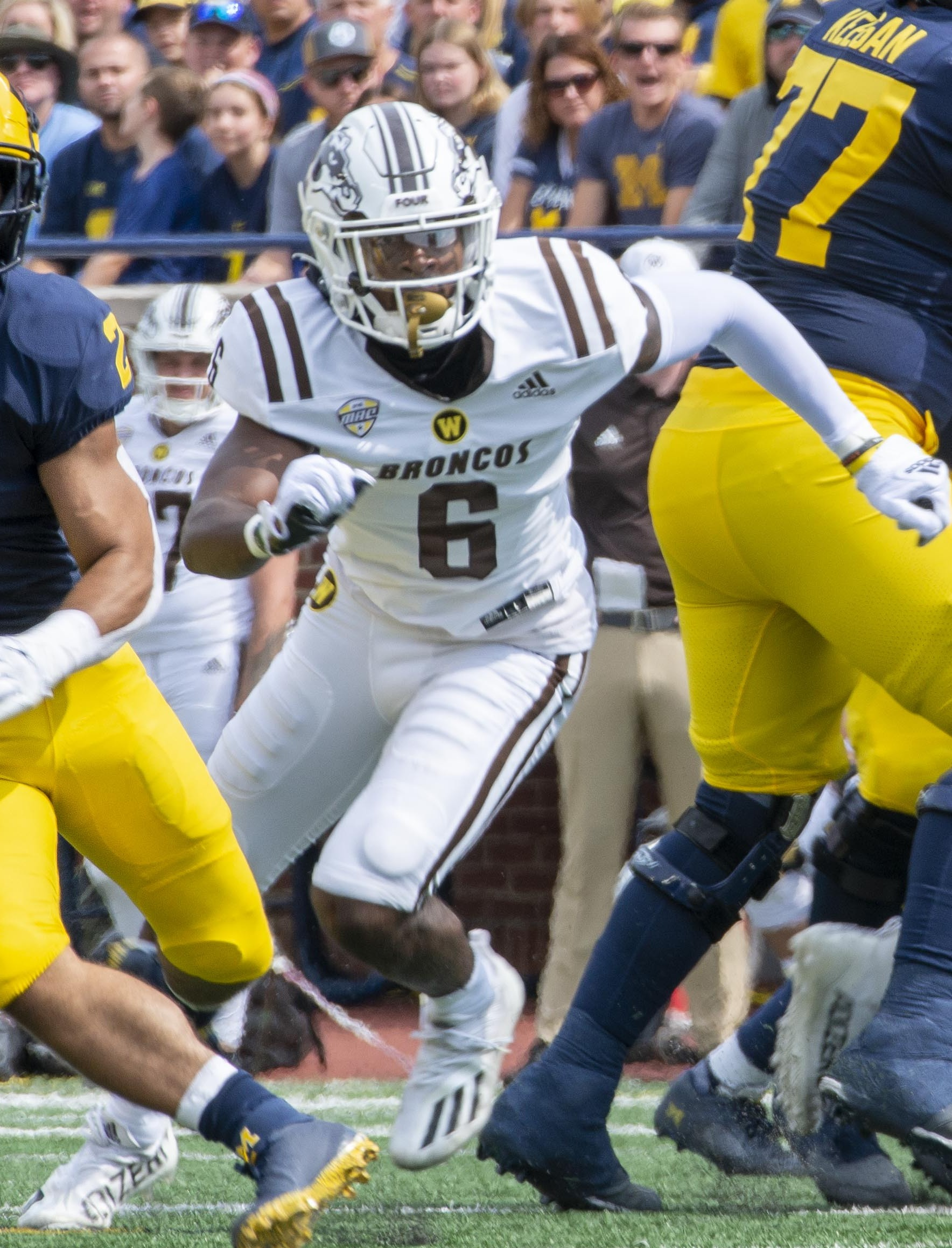
- Thomas with Western Michigan in 2021

No. 32
- Position: Safety

Personal information
- Born: September 18, 1999 (age 27); Detroit, Michigan, U.S.
- Listed height: 6 ft 2 in (1.88 m)
- Listed weight: 216 lb (98 kg)

Career information
- High school: University of Detroit Jesuit High School and Academy
- College: Western Michigan (2017–2021)
- NFL draft: 2022: undrafted

Career history
- Chicago Bears (2022–2023); Birmingham Stallions (2024); New England Patriots (2024)*; Birmingham Stallions (2025); St. Louis Battlehawks (2026)
- * Offseason or practice squad member only

Awards and highlights
- UFL champion (2024); All-UFL Team (2024); UFL interception leader (2024)

Career NFL statistics
- Total tackles: 4
- Stats at Pro Football Reference

A. J. Thomas (born September 18, 1999) is an American former professional football safety. He played college football at Western Michigan.

== Professional career ==
Pre-draft measurables
Height	Weight	Arm length	Hand span	Wingspan	40-yard dash	10-yard split	20-yard split	20-yard shuttle	Three-cone drill	Vertical jump	Broad jump	Bench press
6 ft 2 in (1.88 m)	214 lb (97 kg)	33 1/2 in (0.85 m)	9 5/8 in (0.24 m)	6 ft 7 1/8 in (2.01 m)	4.60 s	1.58 s	2.64 s	4.26 s	7.03 s	33.0 in (0.84 m)	10 ft 1 in (3.07 m)	13 reps
All values from Pro Day

=== Chicago Bears ===
After going unselected in the 2022 NFL draft, Thomas was signed by the Chicago Bears as an undrafted free agent. He was released on August 30, during the final roster cuts, and was signed to the practice squad the next day. Thomas was elevated to the active roster on November 29, and made his NFL debut on December 4 against the Green Bay Packers, recording one tackle while appearing on 13 snaps.

On August 30, 2023, Thomas was waived by the Bears and re-signed to the practice squad. He was released on October 29.

=== Birmingham Stallions ===
On February 14, 2024, Thomas signed with the Birmingham Stallions of the United Football League (UFL). He was named to the 2024 All-UFL team on June 5, 2024. His contract was terminated on August 1, 2024.

=== New England Patriots ===
On August 2, 2024, Thomas signed with the New England Patriots. He was waived on August 27, and re-signed to the practice squad. He was released on September 16.

=== Birmingham Stallions (second stint) ===
On January 14, 2025, Thomas re-signed with the Birmingham Stallions of the United Football League (UFL). He was placed on injured reserve on June 4, 2025.

=== St. Louis Battlehawks ===
On January 13, 2026, Thomas was selected by the St. Louis Battlehawks in the 2026 UFL draft. He played 8 games with the Battlehawks, recording 30 tackles, an interception and a broken-up pass. At the end of the 2026 he was the UFL's career leader for interceptions.

On November 12th, 2026, the UFL announced that Thomas had retired from professional football.
