= Ajit =

Ajit, Ajith or Ajeet may refer to:

- Ajit (given name), an Indian masculine given name (including a list of persons with the name)
  - Ajit Bandyopadhyay (disambiguation)
  - Ajit Khan or Ajit (born 1922), an Indian Hindi film actor
  - Ajit Kumar (disambiguation)
    - Ajith Kumar (born 1971), an Indian Tamil film actor
  - Ajit Pawar (1959-2026), an Indian politician
  - Ajith Rajapakse (born 1974), a Sri Lankan politician
- Ajith (film), a 2014 Indian Kannada film
- HAL Ajeet, an Indian jet fighter plane
- Ajit, an alternative name of the future Buddha Maitreya
- Ajit Shenoy, fictional Indian spymaster (of R&AW) in the YRF Spy Universe
- Ajit (newspaper), a Punjabi language daily newspaper in India

== See also ==
- Ajita (disambiguation)
