= Ajit (given name) =

Ajit, variously spelled Ajith, Agith, or Ajeet (ajita) is a common male given name. It is used in its various forms throughout India and also in Nepal, Bangladesh and Sri Lanka. A related name is Ajay.

== Etymology ==
The name is derived from Sanskrit, where its primary meaning is "invincible", "irresistible", "unsurpassed". The literal meaning is "unconquered", from the prefix a- "not", and jita "conquered". It has variously been used to refer to a number of ideological figures, including Shiva and Vishnu in Hinduism, Maitreya in Buddhism and the second of the Arhats in Jainism among others.

== People ==
- Ajith Kumar (born 1996), Tamilnadu
- Ajit Agarkar (born 1977), Indian cricketer and commentator
- Ajith Amerasekera, American electrical engineer
- Ajit Andhare, Indian businessman
- Ajit Anjum (born 1969), Indian journalist and editor
- Ajeet Bajaj (born 1965), Indian adventurer
- Ajit Balakrishnan, Indian entrepreneur, business executive, and administrator
- Ajit Bandyopadhyay, Bengali actor and director
- Ajit Kumar Banerjee (1931–2014), Indian environmentalist
- Ajit Kumar Basu (1912–1986), Indian cardiac surgeon
- Ajit Bhandari (born 1994), Nepalese footballer
- Ajit Bharihoke, Indian judge
- Ajit Bhatia (born 1936), Indian cricketer
- Ajit Bhattacharjea (1924–2011), Indian journalist, newspaper editor, The Hindustan Times, The Times of India and The Indian Express
- Ajit Bhoite (born 1976), Indian cricketer
- Ajit Kumar Bhuyan (born 1952), Indian politician
- Ajit Chahal (born 1995), Indian cricketer
- Ajit Kumar Chakravarty (1886–1918), Bengali writer
- Ajit Chandila (born 1983), Indian cricketer
- Ajit Chandra Chatterjee (born 1923), Indian civil servant
- Ajit Kumar Chaturvedi, Indian professor and education administrator
- Ajit Das (1949–2020), Indian actor, director, and playwright
- Ajit Das Gupta (1924–2011), Indian cricketer
- Ajit Doval (born 1945), Indian politician
- Ajit Dutta (1907–1979), Bengali poet, writer, essayist, and professor
- Ajit George, Indian-American activist and game designer
- Ajit Kumar Guha (1914–1969), Bengali educationist
- Ajit Gulabchand (born 1948), Indian industrialist
- Ajit Gupta, Indian entrepreneur
- Ajit Narain Haksar (1925–2005), Indian businessman
- Ajit Hutheesing (1936–2017), Indian businessman
- Ajit Jain (born 1951), Indian-American businessman
- Ajit Jayaratne, Sinhalese businessman
- Ajit Jogi (1946–2020), Indian politician
- Ajit Johnson, Indian cancer geneticist
- Ajit Kadkade, Indian singer
- Ajit Kembhavi (born 1950), Indian astrophysicist
- Ajita Kesakambali, Indian philosopher
- Ajit Khan (1922–1998), screen name of Indian film actor Hamid Ali Khan
- Ajith Kumar (born 1971), Indian Tamil actor
- Ajit Lakra (born 1966), Indian field hockey player
- Ajit Kumar Maiti (born 1928), Indian neurophysiologist
- Ajit Manocha, Indian-American businessman
- Ajit Kumar Mehta (born 1932), Indian politician
- Ajit Merchant, Indian music composer and director
- Ajit Mohan (born 1974/1975), Indian businessman
- Ajit Narayanan (born 1981), Indian inventor
- Ajit Ninan (born 1955), Indian political cartoonist
- Ajit Kumar P, Indian Navy Admiral
- Ajit Pai (born 1973), American attorney and former chairman of the Federal Communications Commission
- Ajit Pai (born 1945), Indian cricketer
- Ajit Pawar (1959–2026), Indian politician
- Ajit Kumar Panja (1936–2008), Indian politician
- Ajith C. S. Perera (born 1956), Sri Lankan disability activist, former cricket umpire
- Ajit Kumar Saha, Indian politician
- Ajit de Silva (born 1952), Sri Lankan cricketer
- Ajeet Singh Kharkhari (born 1965), Indian politician of the Bharatiya Janata Party
- Ajit Singh (disambiguation), several people
- Ajith Kumar Siriwardena, Sri Lankan Briton professor of hepato-pancreatico-biliary surgery
- Ajit Iqbal Singh (born 1943), Indian mathematician
- Ajit Wadekar (born 1941), a former Indian cricketer and captain of the Indian national cricket tea

== Fictional characters ==
- Ajit Bandyopadhyay (character), companion of Byomkesh Bakshi
