= Maity =

Bengali surname

Maity or Maiti is an Indian surname which belongs primarily to the Mahishya community, and is also found among Tilli, Sadgop, Poundra etc communities of Indian state West Bengal.

== Notable people ==
- Abha Maiti (1925-1994), Indian politician
- Iris Maity, (born 1958), Indian model and actress
- Paresh Maity (born 1965), Indian painter
- Somenath Maity (born 1960), Indian artist
- Tapan Maity, Indian footballer
- Ajit Kumar Maiti (born 1928), Indian neurophysiologist
- Kalobaran Maiti (born 1967), Indian physicist
- Mrigendra Nath Maiti, Indian politician
- Souvik Maiti (born 1971), Indian chemist
- Somraj Maity, Indian actor
- Aratrika Maity, Indian actress
- Rabindranath Maity, Indian politician
- Sukhendu Maity, Indian politician
- Prafulla Maity, Indian politician
- Tarun Kumar Maity, Indian politician
- Debabrata Maiti, Indian chemist
