= Agita =

Agita may refer to:

- "Agita", a song from the 1984 film Broadway Danny Rose
- 4392 Agita, a minor planet
- Agita language, an old name for the Fuyug language of Papua New Guinea
- Ryan Agita and Stanis Agita, members of the Papua New Guinea national Australian rules football team 2014 and 2017

== See also ==
- Heartburn
- Indigestion
- Annoyance
- Ajita (disambiguation)
