= Amerasekera =

- Language: Sinhala

Origin
- Region of origin: Sri Lanka

Amerasekera is a Sinhalese surname.

== Notable people ==
- Ajith Amerasekera, Sri Lankan engineer
- Rohan Amerasekera (1916–1974), Ceylonese Air Force officer
- Vijitha Amerasekera (born 1961), Sri Lankan athlete
