= Ajita =

Ajita, Ajitha or Ajeeta may refer to:

- Ajita, an alternative name of the future Buddha Maitreya
- Ajita, a name applied to various mythological figures, including Shiva, Vishnu and Ajitanatha
- Ajit (given name), an Indian masculine given name (including a list of persons with the name)
- Ajita Kesakambali, ancient Indian philosopher
- K. Ajitha, former Indian naxalite
- Ajita Wilson (c.1950 – 1987), American actress
- Ajita Suchitra Veera, Indian film director, writer and photographer
- Ajita or Asita, one of the Eighteen Arhats

== See also ==
- Ajit (disambiguation)
- Ajitha purana
