= Tiasa Adhya =

Indian conservationist and ecologist

Tiasa Adhya (born c. 1986) is an Indian conservationist and wildlife biologist. She is known for her work on protecting fishing cats and has received the Nari Shakti Puraskar, the highest civilian award for women in India from the Ministry of Women and Child Development, Govt of India. She is also member of IUCN Cat Specialist Group, IUCN Otter Specialist Group and IUCN Freshwater Conservation Committee and has taken part in the Red List Assessment for Fishing Cats for IUCN.

== Early life and education ==
Adhya was drawn to animals at a young age. Her interest in wildlife conservation helped her to pass school and get her bachelor's degree. She studied zoology at the University of Calcutta. She was introduced to work with fishing cats by Shomita Mukherjee, who at the time was the only specialist on small cats in India. Other people she worked with in her early career included Jim Sanderson (conservationist) and Ajith Kumar. In 2022, she graduated from The University of Trans-Disciplinary Health Sciences and Technology with a master's degree in ecology and conservation.

== Career and research ==
Her research focuses on fishing cat populations, particularly in West Bengal and Odisha. She co-founded the Fishing Cat Project with Partha Dey in 2010. She works to help the public understand the importance of fishing cat conservation, breaking down scientific jargon into other forms including eco-poetry and film. Her work focuses on building a community that prioritizes conservation together. She is also Joint Secretary and Director of its Ecology and Conservation Programs at the Human & Environment Alliance League. She is also Adjunct Faculty at St Xavier's (Autonomous) College, Kolkata and had designed and implemented a semester course on Wetland Ecology and Conservation, the first time that a course on wetlands was integrated at the undergraduate level in Indian academia.

== Selected publications ==
Adhya, T., & Banerjee, S. (2022). Impact of wetland development and degradation on the livelihoods of wetland-dependent communities: a case study from the lower gangetic floodplains. Wetlands, 42(7), 65.

Adhya, T., Banerjee, S., Dey, P., Nanda, S., Santra, S., & Nesha, I. (2024). Density estimation of the globally threatened fishing cat Prionailurus viverrinus through a participatory science approach in the Chilika lagoon, eastern India. Endangered Species Research, 54, 1-13.

Adhya, T., & Dey, P. (2020). First record of Eurasian otter (Lutra lutra) from Chilika lagoon: a Ramsar site situated on the East coast of India. OTTER, Journal of the International Otter Survival Fund, 6, 49-55.

== Awards and recognition ==
- 2018 Wildlife Conservation Network Scholarship
- Future for Nature Award, 2022
- Nari Shakti Puraskar
- Wildlife Service Award from the Sanctuary Nature Foundation
