= List of surviving Folland Gnats =

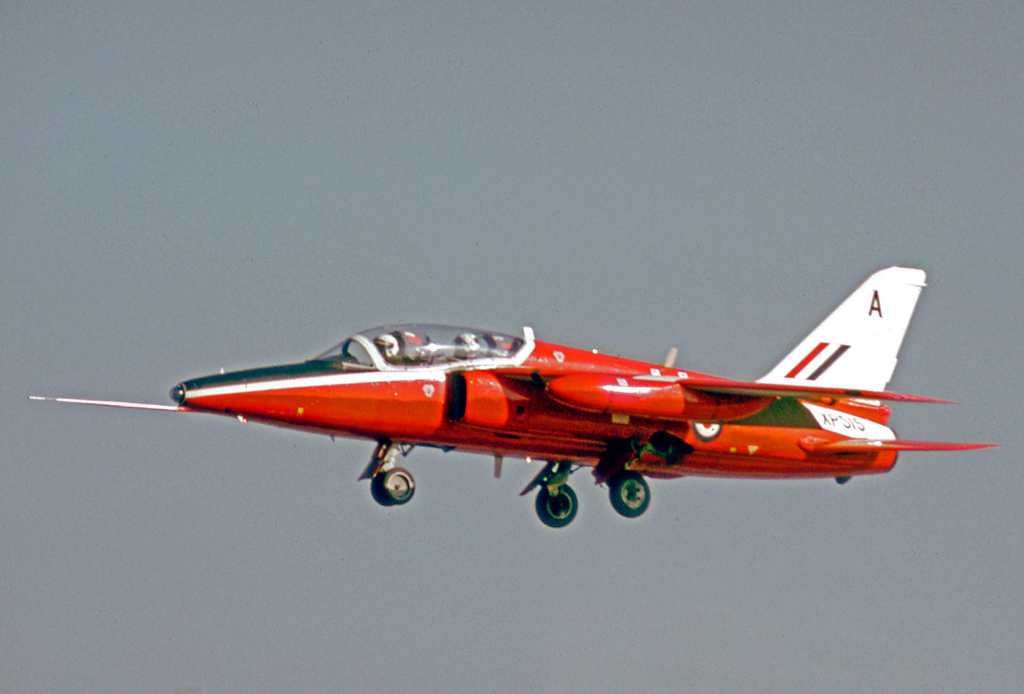
Folland Gnat

The Folland Gnat was a single-seat jet fighter and training aircraft that served with the British, Finnish, Indian and Yugoslav air forces. The HAL Ajeet, or Gnat 2, is also included.

== Surviving aircraft ==
=== Australia ===
Stored or under restoration

- Gnat T1 VH-XSO painted as XS101 at Melbourne, Victoria

=== Bangladesh ===
Stored or under restoration

- HAL Ajeet at Bangladesh Air Force Museum, Dhaka

On display

- Gnat F1 at Liberation War Museum, Dhaka

=== Finland ===
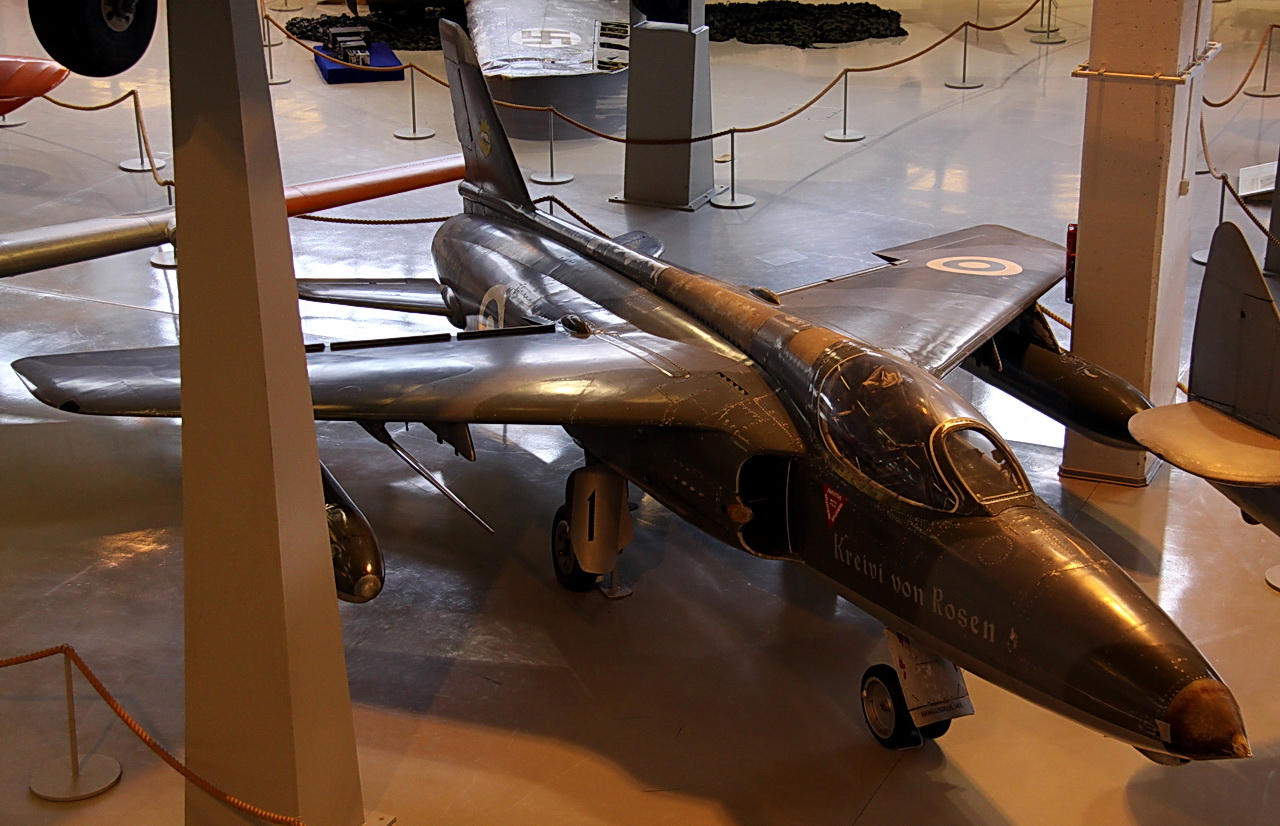
Folland Gnat Mk.1 (GN-101) in Airforce Museum of Central Finland

stored or under restoration

- Gnat F1 GN-101 at Finnish Airforce Museum near Jyväskylä Airport
- Gnat F1 GN-103 gateguard at Karelian Aviation Museum at Lappeenranta Airport
- Gnat F1 GN-104 gateguard at Finnish Airforce Museum near Jyväskylä Airport
- Gnat F1 GN-105 stored dismantled at the Finnish Aviation Museum near Vantaa Airport, Helsinki
- Gnat F1 GN-106 at Karelian Aviation Museum at Lappeenranta Airport
- Gnat F1 GN-107 at Karhula Aviation Museum at Kymi airfield near Kotka
- Gnat F1 GN-110 on pole at the air defence memorial near gate to Jaeger Brigade Air Defence Battalion at Rovaniemi airfield.
- Gnat FR1 GN-112 at Päijät-Häme Aviation Museum at Vesivehmaa airfield, north of Lahti
- Gnat FR1 GN-113 stored disassembled at Helsinki-Malmi Airfield

=== India ===
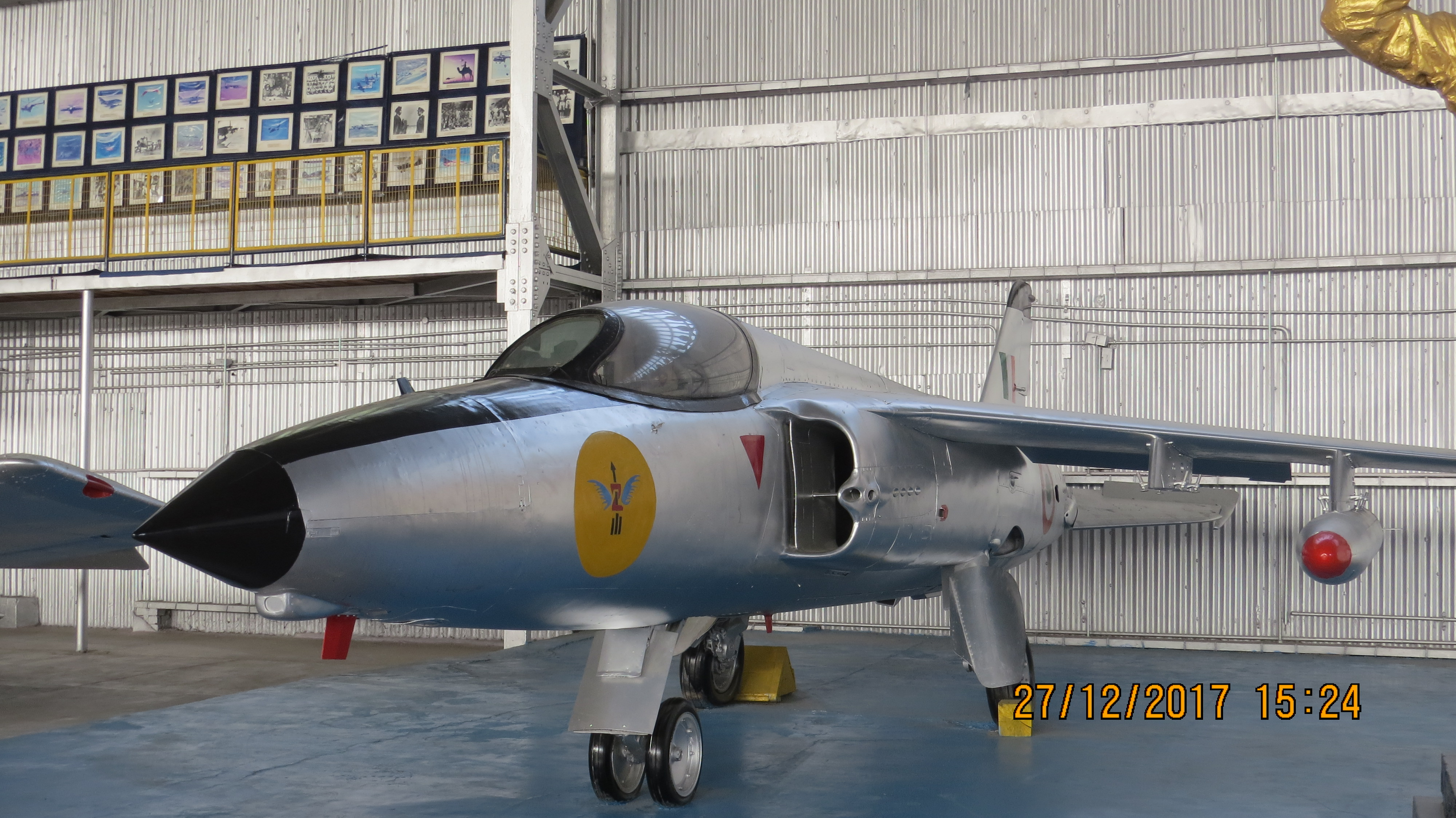
A Gnat F1 preserved at the Indian Air Force Museum, Palam, New Delhi

Airworthy (2008)

- Gnat F1 E265 Indian Air Force Historic Flight, Palam, Delhi

On display

- Gnat F1 IE1059 at Indian Air Force Museum, Palam, Delhi
- Gnat F1 IE1205 at Indian Air Force Headquarters Display, Delhi
- Gnat F1 IE1246 at Indian Air Force Headquarters Display, Delhi
- Gnat F1 at Kerala State Science and Technology Museum, Thiruvananthapuram
- Gnat F1 IE1062 at Martyr's Memorial, Dharamshala
- Gnat F1 at Nirmal Jit Singh Sekhon Memorial, Ludhiana
- Gnat F1 E254 at Pragathi Maidan Defence Exhibition, New Delhi
- Gnat F1 E311 at The Lawrence School, Sanawar
- Gnat F1 E325 at Diamond Garden, Chembur, Mumbai
- Gnat F1 IE1208 at La Martinière College, Lucknow
- Gnat F1 at Jawahar Bal Bhavan in Thrissivaperoor, Kerala
- HAL Ajeet E1975 at Indian Air Force Headquarters Display, Delhi
- HAL Ajeet E1083 at Hindustan Aerospace War Memorial, Bangalore
- HAL Ajeet IE1975 at Indian Air Force Museum, Palam, Delhi
- HAL Ajeet E2016 at Indian Air Force Museum, Palam, Delhi
- HAL Ajeet at Kangla Fort
- HAL Ajeet E1964 at 4 AFSB, Varanasi

Stored or under restoration

- Gnat F1 at Air Force Bhararti School Display
- Gnat F1 at Ambala Air Force Station War Memorial
- Gnat F1 at Bagdogra Air Force Station Museum
- Gnat F1 at Bareilly Air Force Station Museum
- Gnat F1 Central Air Command Headquarters Museum, Allahabad
- Gnat F1 at Chandigarh Air Force Station Museum
- Gnat F1 at Defence Services Staff College Display Museum, Wellington, Tamil Nadu
- Gnat F1 Painted as DJ1992 at Diamond Jubilee Museum, Midnapur
- Gnat F1 E232 at Diamond Jubilee Museum, Midnapur
- Gnat F1 E1046 at Hasimara Air Force Station Museum
- Gnat F1 E1205 at Indian Air Force Historic Flight, Palam, Delhi
- Gnat F1 E1246 at Indian Air Force Historic Flight, Palam, Delhi
- Gnat F1 at Indian Air Force Technical College Collection, Bangalore
- Gnat F1 E323 at Indian Air Force Technical College Collection, Bangalore
- Gnat F1 at Lawrence School Memorial, Lovedale
- Gnat F1 E261 at Maintenance Command Headquarters Display, Nagpur
- Gnat F1 E1059 at Mayo College Memorial, Ajmer
- Gnat F1 E247 at National Defence Academy, Pune
- Gnat F1 at No.9 Airmen Selection Centre Memorial, Bhubaneshwar
- Gnat F1 at Southern Air Command Headquarters Museum. Trivandrum
- Gnat F1 IE1078 at Tambaram Air Force Station Museum
- HAL Ajeet E1048 at Defence Services Staff College Display Museum, Wellington, Tamil Nadu
- HAL Ajeet E1956at Diamond Jubilee Museum, Midnapur
- HAL Ajeet IE1241 at Doon School Memorial,
- HAL Ajeet at Eastern Air Command Headquarters Museum, Shillong
- HAL Ajeet at Military College of Electrical and Mechanical Engineering, Hyderabad
- HAL Ajeet painted as E1972 at St Mary's School Memorial, Pune

=== New Zealand ===
Under restoration

- Gnat T1 XR987, now registered as ZK-RAJ. XR987 was one of the original YellowJacks aircraft and one of the founding aircraft of the Red Arrows of the Royal Air Force. Now at Tauranga Airport, New Zealand

=== Pakistan ===
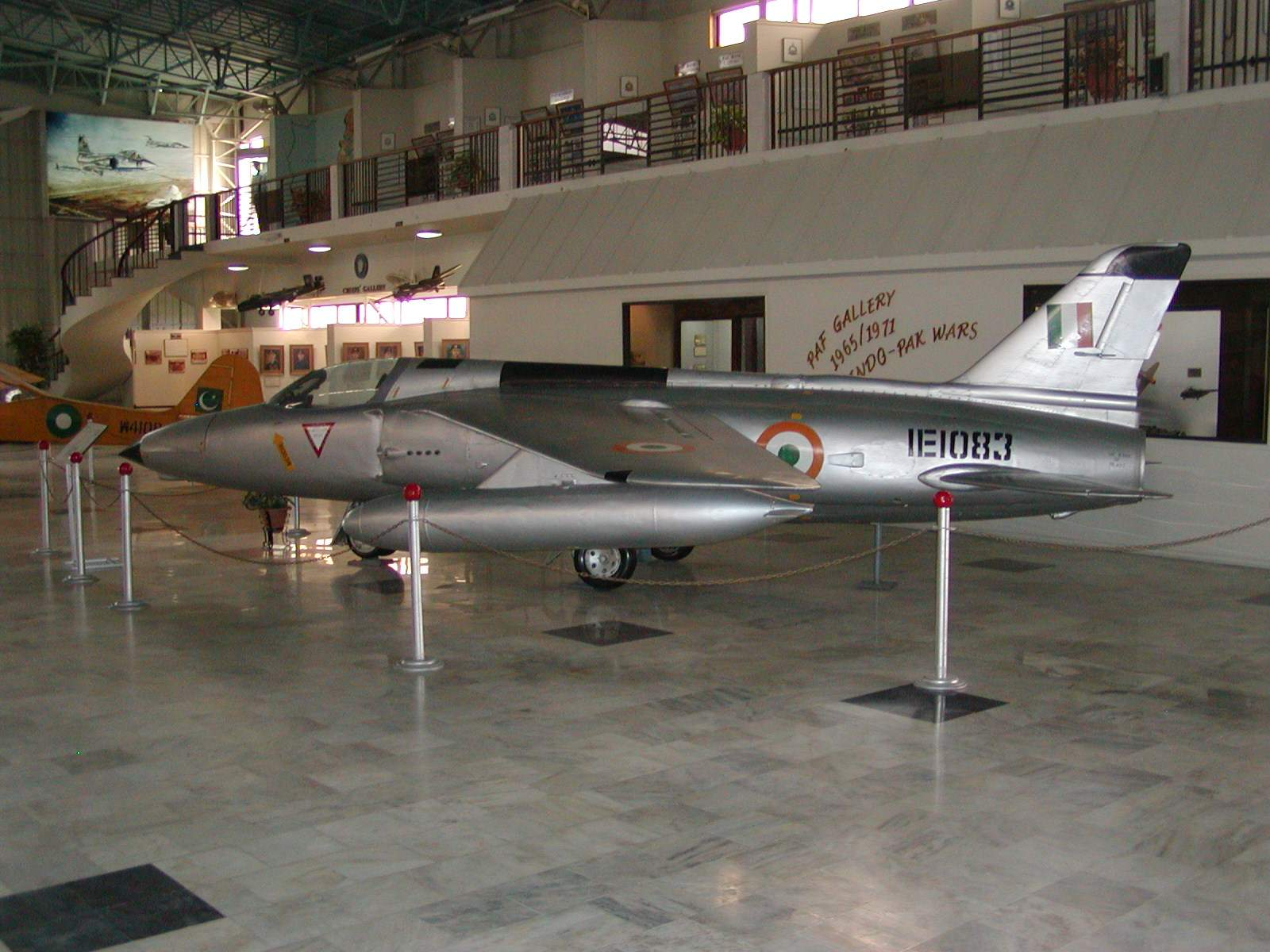
Gnat F1 IE1083

- Gnat F1 IE1083 at Pakistan Air Force Museum, Karachi

=== Serbia ===
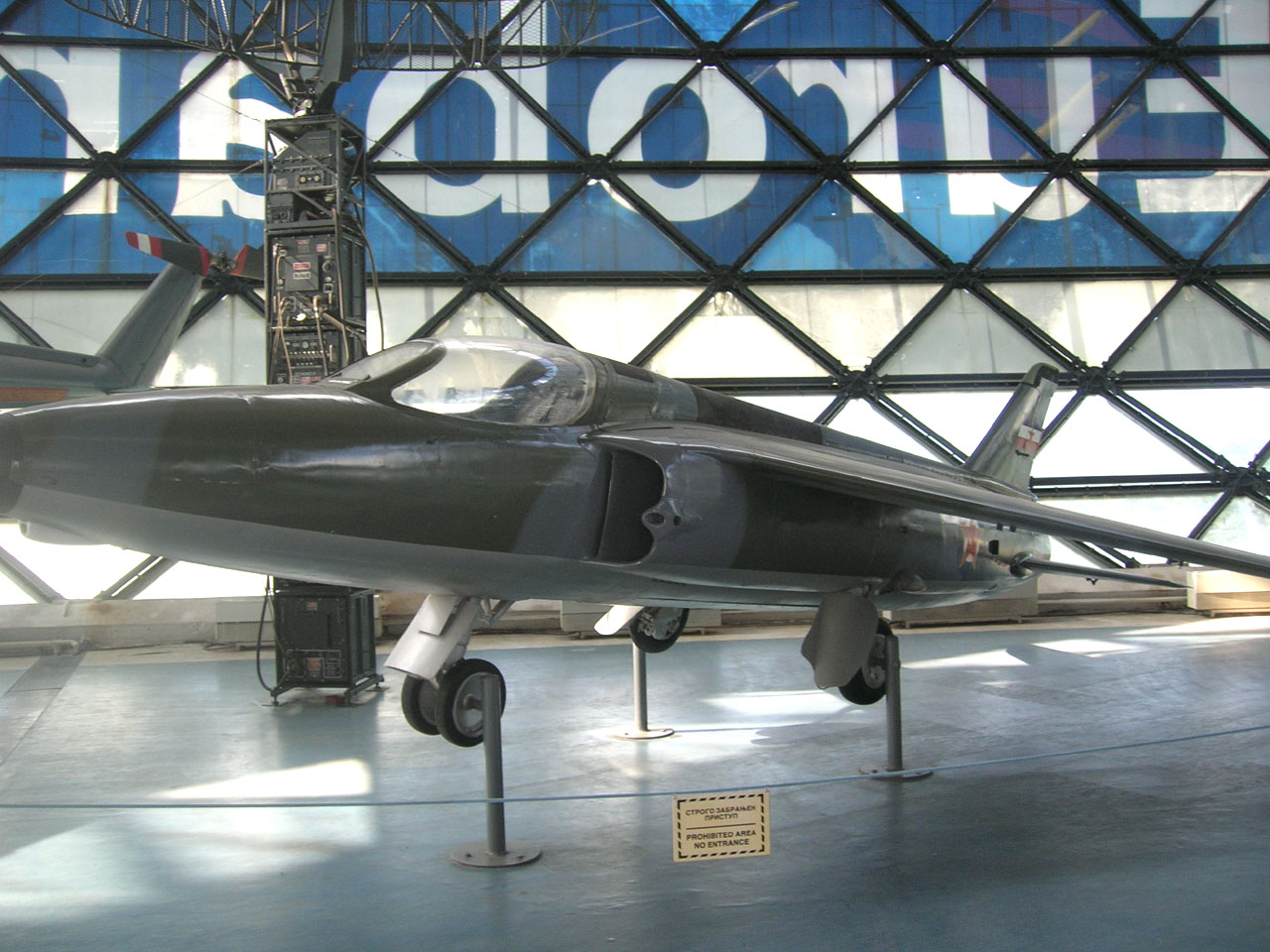
Gnat F.1 at the Belgrade Aviation Museum

On display

- Gnat F1 11601 at the Belgrade Aviation Museum

=== United Kingdom ===
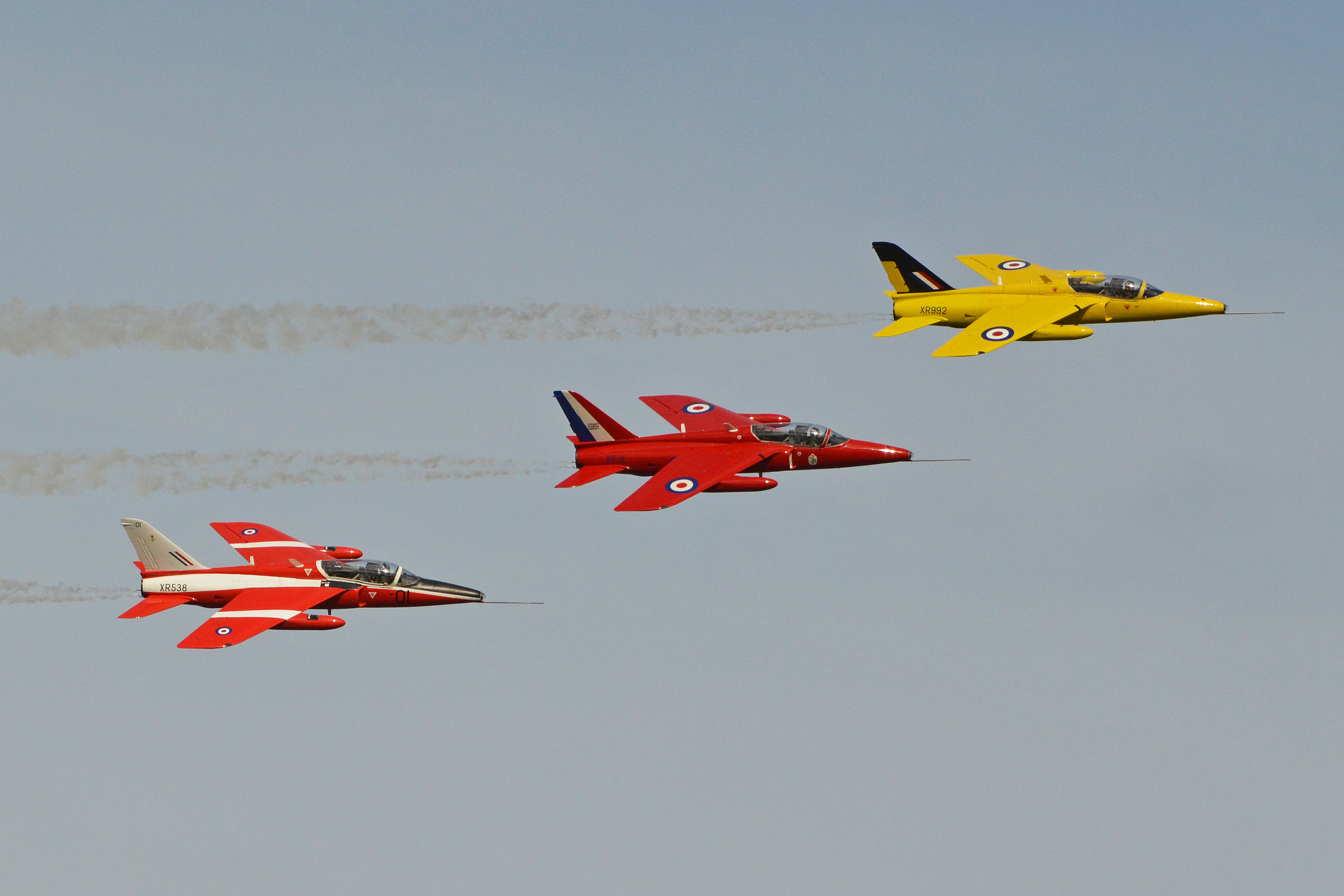
The three Gnats of The Heritage Aircraft Trust display at the 2014 RAF Waddington International Airshow

Airworthy

- Gnat T1 G-FRCE (XS104) at North Weald Aerodrome
- Gnat T1 G-NATY painted as XR537 of the Royal Air Force at the Heritage Aircraft Trust, North Weald Aerodrome, Essex
- Gnat T1 G-RORI painted as XR538 of the Royal Air Force at North Weald Aerodrome
- Gnat T1 G-MOUR painted as XR991 of the Royal Air Force at North Weald Aerodrome

The North Weald-based Gnats moved to St Athan in 2024/5 (operating as the Heritage Aircraft Trust/Gnat Display Team )

On display

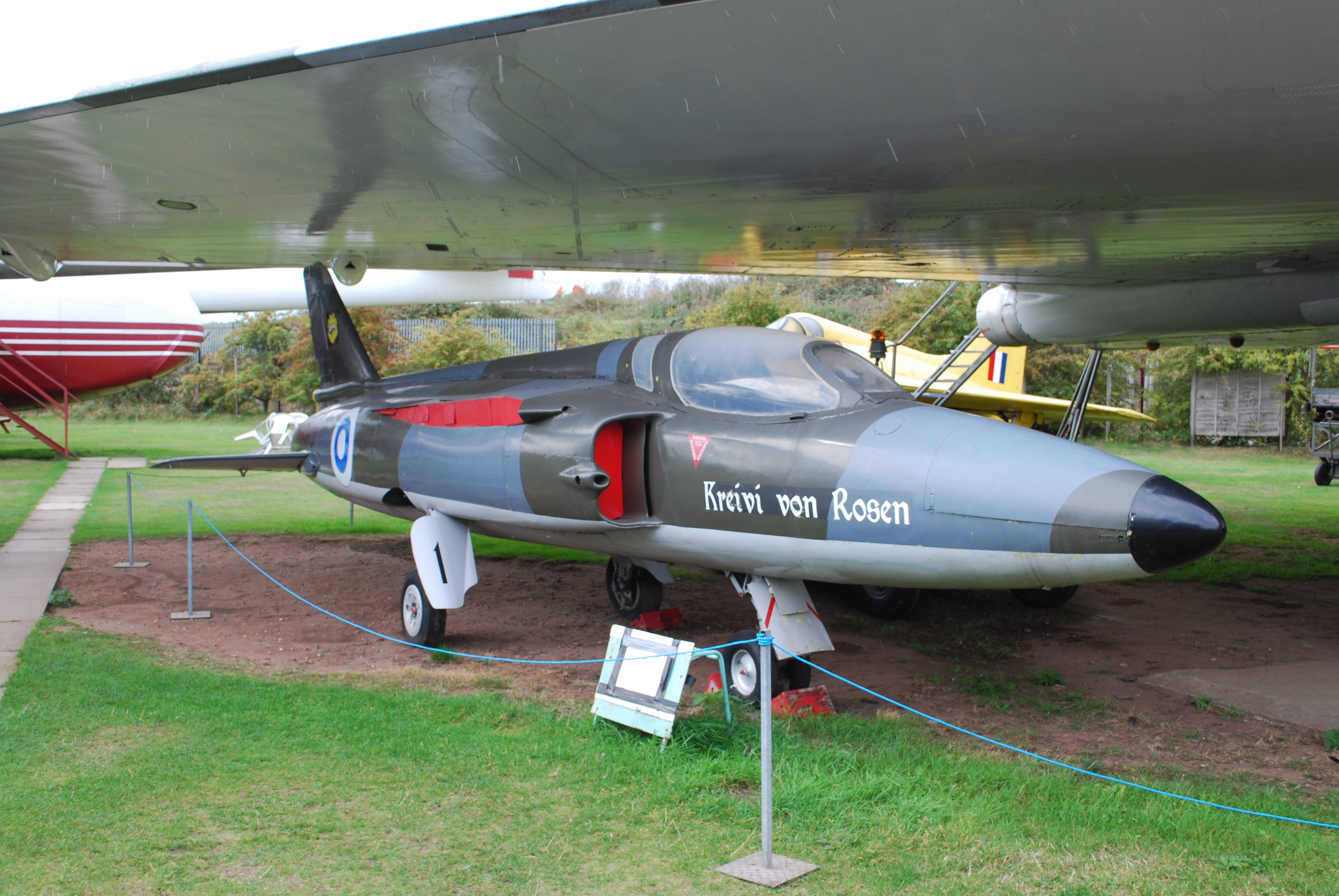
Gnat F1 at Midland Air Museum

- Gnat F1 XK724 at the Royal Air Force Museum Midlands
- Gnat F1 XK740 at the Solent Sky Museum, Southampton, Hampshire
- Gnat F1 XK741 painted as GN-101 of the Finnish Air Force at the Midland Air Museum, Coventry
- Gnat T1 XM693 at the former Hamble Aerodrome, Hampshire
- Gnat T1 XM697 at Reynard Garden Centre, Carluke, South Lanarkshire
- Gnat T1 XP502 painted as XR540 at Cotswold Airport
- Gnat T1 XP516 at Farnborough Air Sciences Trust, Farnborough, Hampshire
- Gnat T1 XP534 painted as XR993 at Bruntingthorpe Aerodrome, Leicestershire
- Gnat T1 XP542 at Air Cadets at Southampton, Hampshire.
- Gnat T1 XR534 at Newark Air Museum
- Gnat T1 XR571 at Tangmere Military Aviation Museum, West Sussex
- Gnat T1 XR574 at Trenchard Museum, RAF Halton, Halton, Buckinghamshire
- Gnat T1 XR977 at Royal Air Force Museum Midlands
- Gnat T1 XS104 at North Weald Airfield

Stored or under restoration

- Gnat F1 G-SLYR marked as E296 Indian Air Force
- Gnat T1 XM708 at Blue Bird Project, Lytham St Anne's, Lancashire
- Gnat T1 XP505 at Science Museum, Wroughton Aerodrome, Wiltshire
- Gnat T1 XP540 at Bruntingthorpe Airfield
- Gnat T1 XR541 at Bournemouth Aviation Museum, Dorset

=== United States ===
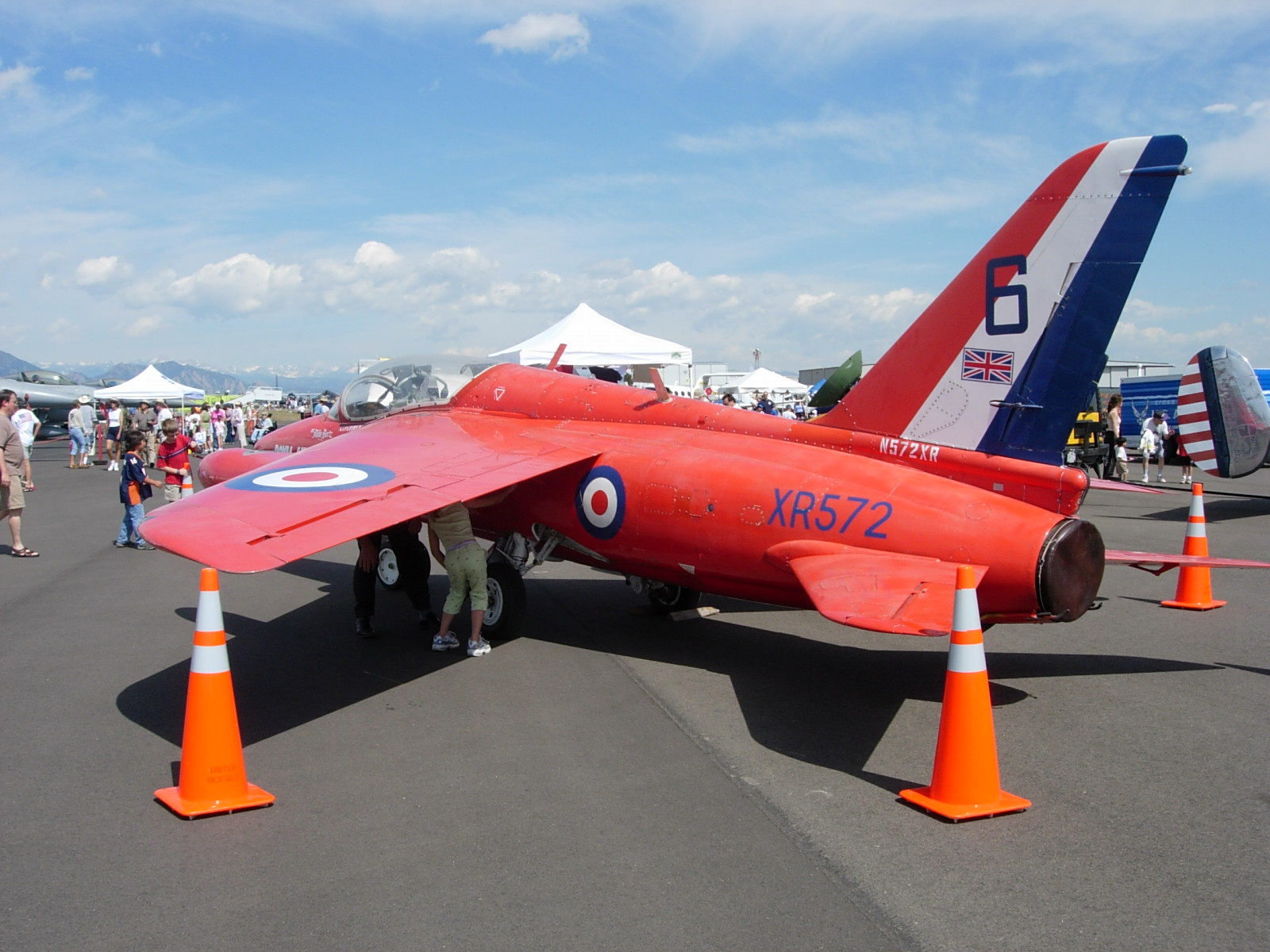
Folland Gnat T.1 'XR572/N572XR' in the markings of the RAF Red Arrows at the Jeffco open house in June 2006

Airworthy

- Gnat T1 N1CL of the Vietnam War Flight Museum at William P. Hobby Airport, Texas
- Gnat T1 N19GT at Chino, California
- Gnat T1 N316RF at San Diego, California
- Gnat T1 N4347N at Fort Lauderdale, Florida
- Gnat T1 N4367L at Austin, Texas
- Gnat T1 N513X at Erie Municipal Airport, Colorado
- Gnat T1 N533XP at Westchester County Airport, Connecticut
- Gnat T1 N572XR painted as XR572 of the Royal Air Force at Rocky Mountain Metropolitan Airport, Broomfield, Colorado
- Gnat T1 N7CV at California City, California (cancelled as exported to New Zealand 7 August 2019)
- Gnat T1 N7HY at Chino, California
- Gnat T1 N8130N at Tallahassee Regional Airport, Florida
- Gnat T1 N8130Q at Front Range Airport, Colorado
- Gnat T1 N936FC at East Islip, New York

On display

- Gnat T1 XM694 at Pima Air Museum, Tucson, Arizona
- Gnat F1 former Indian Air Force E-1076 at March Field Air Museum, Riverside, California.

Stored or under restoration

- Gnat T1 N107XS at Greenwich, Connecticut
- Gnat T1 N109XS at Front Range Airport, South Carolina
- Gnat T1 N117SH at Lawrenceville, Georgia
- Gnat T1 N6145X at Livermore, California
- Gnat T1 N698XM painted as Royal Air Force XM698 at St Cloud, Florida
- Gnat T1 N705XM at St Cloud, Florida
- Gnat T1 N81298 at Front Range Airport, South Carolina
- Gnat T1 N998XR at Front Range Airport, South Carolina
