= Ajit Kumar =

Ajit Kumar may refer to:

- Ajith Kumar (biologist) (1952–2025), Indian wildlife biologist
- Ajit Kumar P (active 1981–2021), Indian naval officer
- Ajith Kumar (born 1971), Indian Tamil film actor
- Ajith Kumar (footballer) (born 1996), Indian football defender
