= Ajit Bandyopadhyay =

Ajit Bandyopadhyay may refer to:

- Ajit Bandyopadhyay (actor), Indian actor
- Ajit Bandyopadhyay, a character in the Byomkesh Bakshi series of Indian detective novels
