= Ajit Kumar Chakravarty =

Ajit Kumar Chakravarty (29 August 1886- 19 December 1918) was a Bengali littérateur. He was an ardent admirer of Rabindranath Tagore and his literary works. He born at Mothbari in Faridpur, Bangladesh. By translating the literary works of Tagore he made him popular in Europe.

== Biography ==
Chakravarty was born on August 20, 1886, in Faridpur. He graduated from General Assembly's Institution. He started his career as a teacher at Santiniketan school after completing BA degree in 1903. During this time, he became very fascinated with Rabindra literature and Rabindranath Tagore. He got a scholarship for higher education in 1910 and went to England to study at Manchester College, Oxford. He had a keen perception of literature and was able to impart some of this interest into his students. Through his teaching, through music, literature and dramatics he was able to rouse the minds of children.
