= Somenath Maity =

Indian artist

Somenath Maity (सोमनाथ माइति)
- Born: 1960 (age 65–66); Medinipur
- Education: Visual Arts College, The Indian College of Arts and Draftsmanship, and Arts Acre
- Known for: Paintings, Drawings, Terra Cotta Sculptures
- Notable work: Structures; Cityscapes
- Awards: AIFACS Award (2002); Birla Academy Award (2002)
- Website: somenath-maity.me

Somenath Maity (सोमनाथ माइति) (born 8 November 1960) is an Indian artist known for his oil paintings of urban landscapes.

== Biography ==
Somenath Maity (Born 8 November 1960, Uttar Darua, Darua, Contai, East Midnapore, 721401, West Bengal, India.) is an Indian painter well-known for his oil paintings of urban landscapes. Often regarded as an avant-garde of contemporary Indian Art, Maity works mostly on canvas. He completed his diploma in Fine Arts from the Indian College of Art, Kolkata in 1980-85 and has held his solo shows at major galleries in Kolkata, Mumbai, Bangalore and New Delhi. His works has also been exhibited in Germany, Sweden and UK. He has received several awards and scholarships including the AIFACS award and scholarship in 1995-02, Birla Academy Award and a Senior Fellowship from the Ministry of HRD, Govt. of India in 2002. He lives and works near Kolkata.

== Education ==
Somenath studied fine arts at the Visual Arts College under guidance of fellow artist Shuvaprasanna in Calcutta and completed his Diploma in Fine Arts from The Indian College of Arts and Draftsmanship.

== Honours ==
- 2002-03 Senior Fellowship, ministry of Culture, Govt. of India
- 2002 AIFACS Award, New Delhi
- 2002 Birla Academy Award, Calcutta
- 1995 AIFACS Scholarship, New Delhi
- 1993-94 Research Grant from Lalitkala Academy, New Delhi
- 1992 All India Youth Art Camp organised by IAAI
- 1986 Cultural Dept. of West Bengal
- 1984-85 B. P. Poddar Memorial Scholarship, College of Visual Arts, Kolkata
- 2012 Jury of All India Camel Colour Art Contest

== Solo Shows ==
- 2015 Mahua Art Gallery, Bengaluru
- 2014 Jehangeer Art Gallery, Mumbai
- 2013 Tao Art Gallery, Mumbai
- 2013 Prakrit Art Gallery, Chennai
- 2013 Jehangir Art Gallery, Mumbai
- 2011 Lalit Kala Akademi, New Delhi
- 2011 Tao Art Gallery, Mumbai
- 2010 Tao Art Gallery, Mumbai
- 2009 Jehangir Art Gallery, Mumbai
- 2008 Sanskriti Art Gallery, Calcutta
- 2007 Art Space, Calcutta
- 2006 Mahua Art Gallery, Bangalore
- 2006 Art Folio Gallery, Chandigarh
- 2005 Time and Space, Bangalore
- 2005 Tao Art Gallery, Mumbai
- 2004 Gallery One, Gurgaon
- 2003 Jehangir Art Gallery, Mumbai
- 2002 Birla Academy of Art & Culture, Calcutta
- 2002 Trivenikala Sangam, New Delhi
- 2001 Karnataka Chitrakala Parishath, Bangalore
- 2000 Karnataka Chitrakala Parishath, Bangalore
- 1999 Jehangir Art Gallery, Mumbai
- 1998 Birla Academy of Art & Culture, Calcutta
- 1997 Rabindra Bhavan, Lalitkala Academy, New Delhi
- 1994 Birla Academy of Art & Culture, Calcutta
- 1991 Birla Academy of Art & Culture, Calcutta
- 1991 Bajaj Art Gallery, Mumbai
- 1989 Tagore Art Gallery, Airport, Calcutta
- 1986 Academy of Fine Arts, Calcutta

== Shows Abroad ==
- 2007 One Man Show and Artist in Residency at Manhattan & Warwick, New York, Fremond, San
- 2007 Group Show at London organised by Mahua Art Gallery
- 2007 Imprints – Indiart Show at Ueno Royal Museum, Tokyo, Japan
- 2007 Royal Academy, London organised by Art Alive
- 2006 Group Show at LASALLE-SIA College of the Arts, Singapore
- 2006 Group Show at London organised by Aroshi Gallery
- 2002 Henley Festival, U.K.
- 2002 Group Show and Artist in Residency at Barn Gallery, Henley, U.K.
- 1991 Group Show at Greenwich Citizen Art Gallery, U.K.
- 1991 Group Show at Ipswitch Art Gallery, U.K.
- 1983 One Man Show at Stuttgart, West Germany
- 1983 Group Show at Stockholm, Sweden

== Press Reception ==
Maity is well known as an oil painter across India, whether judged by his appearances in national newspapers or by the number of galleries offering his works for sale.
