= Ajith Kumar Siriwardena =

Ajith Kumar Siriwardena FRCS
- Born: 9 September 1956 (age 70); Sri Lanka
- Education: University of Manchester
- Occupation: Professor of Hepato-pancreato-biliary Surgery
- Employer: Manchester Royal Infirmary

Ajith Kumar Siriwardena is a Sri Lankan-British doctor who is professor of hepato-pancreatico-biliary surgery at the University of Manchester, and a consultant hepatobiliary surgeon at the Manchester Royal Infirmary.

== Biography ==
He qualified in medicine from the University of Manchester and trained in surgery in Manchester and Edinburgh. He undertook advanced liver surgical training in Paris and worked as a consultant in the national liver surgery unit in Scotland. He currently provides expertise in liver surgery and pancreas surgery, especially for patients who have had bowel cancer and have then developed metastases in the liver.

== Research ==
Siriwardena's main research interests are liver metastases from bowel cancer. His work has been published in over 100 peer reviewed articles. He sits on the council of the Society of Academic Research (SARS) as well as on the committee of the Europe and Africa Hepato-pancreato-Biliary Association (EAHPBA).
