= Ajita Suchitra Veera =

Indian film director

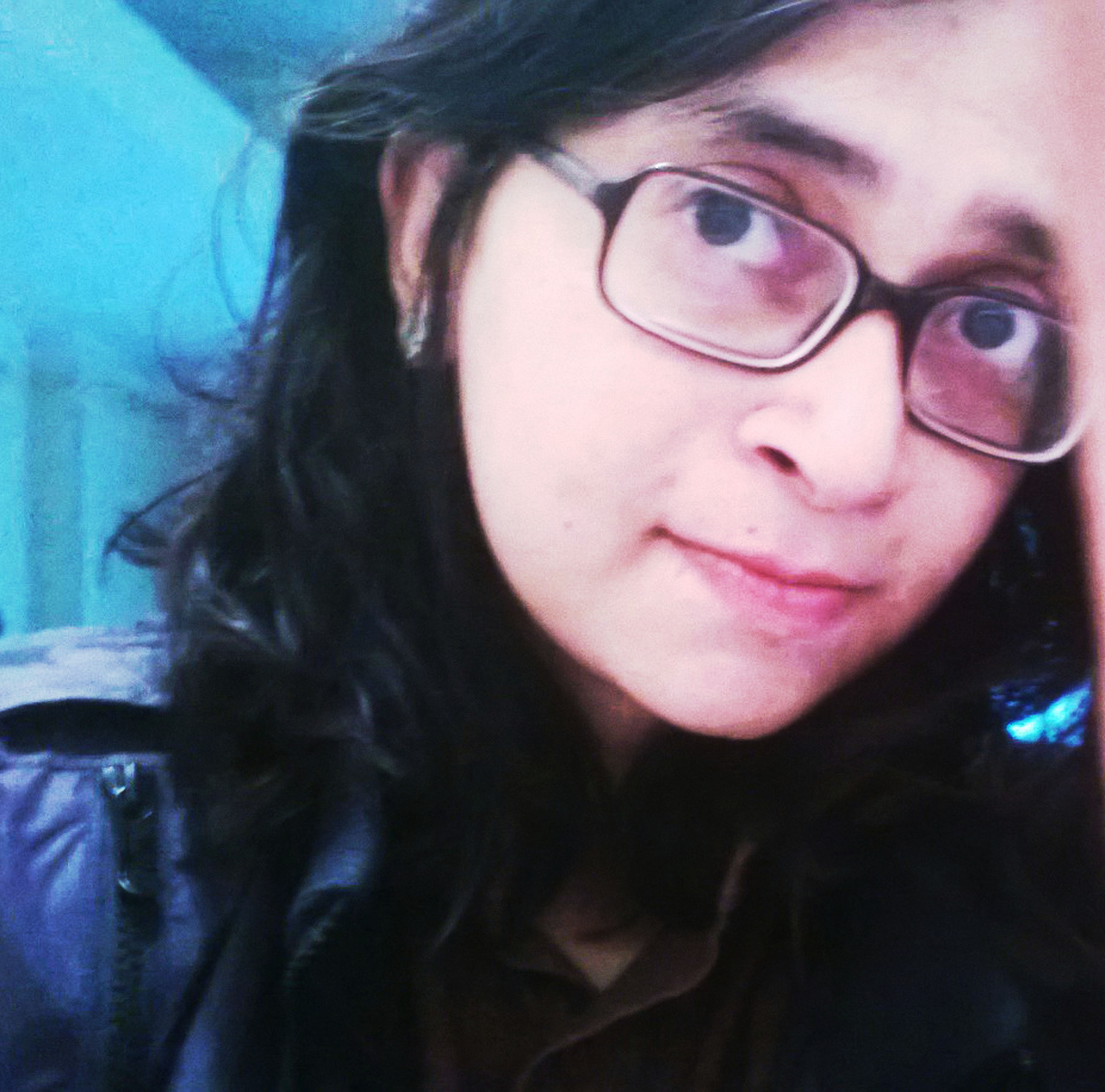
- Film Director

Ajita Suchitra Veera is an Indian film director, writer, illustrator, photographer, and film producer. Veera is best known for a highly visual, grand, epic, cinematic style, with unconventional narrative structures breaking form, blending reality and imagination, fantasy, dreams, scientific, philosophical, metaphysical and humanistic ideas. Her upcoming feature film "Ballad of Rustom" was in Oscar contention for Best Picture 86th Academy Awards 2014. Her earlier short film "Notes on Her" was an official entry to the Oscars in 2003. Her First Feature Film "Ballad of Rustom" which she wrote, directed and produced and also did production design, collaborated on film editing, sound design and music, was described as a "powerful cinematographic poem, epic, and faustian" by The 61st International Film Festival Mannheim, Heidelberg, Germany.

== Early life ==
Veera was born in Hyderabad, Southern India. Her father Anjan Babu, is an illustrator, cartoonist, graphic designer and photo-journalist. Her mother Usha Rani, is a journalist turned banker. At the age of three Veera started learning to sketch from her father, who was an illustrator. She did her schooling from Nasr School, Hyderabad, and was the only child to parents who were both working and much of her early childhood was spent sketching, reading, watching movies and printing photographs with her father in their small private photo studio. Veera's father introduced her to a range of cameras in their studio and she dabbled in making pinhole cameras and other scientific devices, which fascinated her as a child. This would later on influence her distinct visual style. An introvert, shy kid in her childhood, she was raised as a very special and individualistic child by her parents. Both parents loved watching World Cinema, Hollywood classics and Indian Art House. Veera was often taken to watch movies by her father in the local cinemas playing Hollywood films, this was a significant influence in her childhood. David Lean's Doctor Zhivago and the grand epic narratives and adventure films like "Butch Cassidy and Sundance kid" coupled with detective stories and science fiction, which she read avidly, fascinated her immensely. In high school Veera was introduced to the Indian master Satyajit Ray – his films and short stories, which would affect her strongly in her cinematic development. She started watching lot of the World Cinema directors specially French New Wave directors – François Truffaut, Jean-Luc Godard, Robert Bresson and Hollywood directors – Alfred Hitchcock, Sidney Pollack, by renting videos and going to small theatres and film clubs in Hyderabad while graduating from college, and was enamored by directors like Hitchcock, Kurosawa, Tarkovsky and Luis Buñuel. She graduated in Science (St. Ann's College Hyderabad) and was a bright student, however, she decided to discontinue her education in science and pursue her ultimate passion for cinema. After a brief stint in M.A Theatre Arts, Central University Hyderabad (1999) and acting in plays she joined the Film and Television Institute of India, Pune, the prestigious national film institute in India. She graduated in Film Direction.

== Career ==
The short film "Notes on Her" 2003 which she directed was an Oscar entry and critically acclaimed for its unconventional style, it marks the beginning of her cinematic journey. Her graduate film "The Solitary Sandpiper" (short film), blending dream and reality and fantastic visual landscapes, where she worked innovatively to create a distinct color palette with special processing techniques on negative, such as "Bleach bypass" to create desaturated, high contrast images, would be the hallmark of her feature film "Ballad of Rustom" again in 2013 and define her keen interest in image making in cinema. Documentary "CHAOS" which explores the interrelationship of science and art juxtaposing mathematics and music was also a significant step in her filmmaking which mark her distinct craftsmanship. Veera free lanced as a director working on corporate videos and small promotionals (2005–2009) before starting her own film company called Imaginem Cinema in 2009 which she started to create the necessary space for imaginative and interesting new cinema from India.

== Ballad of Rustom ==
Her first feature film Ballad of Rustom (Hindi, 35mm film, CinemaScope, color) which is slated for a worldwide release in 2014, which she wrote, directed and produced under her company Imaginem Cinema, and on which Veera is also the production designer, and extensively collaborated on sound design, film editing and music, won the "Best Director" at the 12th Osian Cinefan in India in 2012 and Veera was also awarded the Indibor Bose Award for Excellence in Cinema (November 2013), instituted by Cine Central one of the oldest film societies, founded by the legendary master Satyajit Ray in Calcutta. This is the first award instituted in 45 years since the formation of this society for a Film Director. "Ballad of Rustom" had unveiled its trailer at the Cannes Marche du Film (2012) and opened at the 61st International Film Festival Mannheim, Heidelberg, in international competition in November 2012, the oldest film festival parallel to Cannes and went to screen in International Film Festival Prague (2013), Czech Republic. Ajita Suchitra Veera is the first Indian director to be invited to this European festival in its 20 long years which has seen World Cinema masters such as Wim Wenders, Roman Polanski, and Krystoff Zanussi. "Ballad of Rustom" was also screened at the 17th International Film Festival Kerala, & International Film Festival Hague, Netherlands (2013) and the 12th Osian Cinefan, New Delhi (2012).

== Awards and recognitions ==
Year	Title
2003	"Notes on Her" -Short Film (Oscar entry Honorary Foreign Film category)
2012	Ballad of Rustom (Best Director at the 12th Osian Cinefan in New Delhi)
2013	Ballad of Rustom (Indibor Bose Award)
2014	Ballad of Rustom (Oscar contention for Best Picture)

== Filmography ==
=== Feature films ===
Year	Movie	Format	Aspect	Language	Duration	Awards	Role	Notes
2013–14	Ballad of Rustom	35 mm film	CinemaScope	Hindi-English	120 min	Best Director (Osian Cinefan, New Delhi) & Indibor Bose Award	Writer, director, Producer & Production Designer	Fiction

=== Short films ===
Year	Movie	Format	Aspect	Language	Duration	Awards	Role	Notes
2000	Stereotype	Digital Video	16:9	English	5 min		Writer & Director	Fiction
2001	Anaganaga	16mm film		Telugu	4 min		Writer & Director	Fiction
2001	Images	16mm film			5 min		Writer & Director	Fiction
2002	A Short Film And Life	35mm film	Widegate	English	5 min		Writer & Director	Fiction
2003	A Day in a Studio	Digital Video		English	15 min		Writer & Director	Fiction
2003	Chaos	Digital Video	16:9	English	5 min		Writer & Director	Documentary
2003	Notes On Her	35mm film	Widegate	Hindi-English	9 min	Oscar entry Honorary Foreign Film	Writer & Director	Fiction
2004	The Isle	35mm film	Cinemascope	Persian	5 min		Writer & Director	Fiction
2004–05	The Solitary Sandpiper	35mm film	Cinemascope	Hindi-English	22 min	Best Art Direction, Best Cinematography	Writer & Director	Fiction
2005	An Unnamed Poem	35mm film	Cinemascope	English	60 min		Writer & Director	Fiction

== Bibliography ==
- "A Character's Real and Imaginary Journey Drive Ballad of Rustom." motion.kodak.com. 28 December 2013.
- Bhushan, Nyay. "12th Osian's Cinefan Festival Awards Best of Asian, Arab Cinema." The Hollywood Reporter. 28 December 2013.
- "Indian Films at Cannes Film Market 2012." Pickle May Cannes 2012 Issue. 28 December 2013.
- Sen. "Febiofest – Proti Proudu Závažně I S Humorem." www.ceskatelevize.cz. 28 December 2013.
- "Ballad of Rustom / Rustom Ki Dastaan Back." International Film Festival Prague. 28 December 2013.
- "61. Internationales Filmfestival Mannheim-Heidelberg 2012: Directors on Stage." YouTube. 20 January 2014.
- "Ballad of Rustom." www.indianffth.nl. 28 December 2013.
- Bansal, Varsha. "Back to Roots with a Ballad." The New Indian Express. 28 December 2013.
- Cine Central Calcutta Film Bulletin. 28 December 2013.
- Lattanzio, Ryan. "289 Feature Films Eligible for Best Picture Oscar." Indiewire.com. 28 December 2013.
- "Inside, B.A. Pass among Winners at Osian's Cinefan." ScreenDaily. 28 December 2013.
- "'Ballad of Rustom' Revisits 35 Mm.". The Hindu. 27 December 2013.
- Mehta, Santosh. "Thinker's Cinema." Deccan Herald. 28 December 2013.
- Bhattacharya, Budhaditya. "Ballad of the Countryside (subscription required)." The Hindu. 28 December 2013.
- "Film Maker Defying Typical Style of Storytelling (subscription required)." The Hindu. 28 December 2013.
- Reminder List of Productions Eligible for the 86th Academy Awards. Academy of Motion Picture Arts and Sciences. 27 December 2013.
- Tracing the Indian Link at the Oscars. Mid-Day 27 December 2013.
- Look Who's Calling at the Oscars. Indian Express. 27 December 2013.
- D'souza, Dipti Nagpaul. "Look Who's Calling at the Oscars." The Financial Express. 28 December 2013.
- Singh, Rajesh Kumar. "Osian's Cinefan Best Director Winner Ajita Suchitra Veera on Her Film BALLAD OF RUSTOM." BollywoodTrade.com. 28 December 2013.
- Singh, Rajesh Kumar. "Ajita Suchitra Veera's BALLAD OF RUSTOM to Open Indian Competition at 12th Osian Cinefan Film Festival." BollywoodTrade.com. 28 December 2013.
- "First Kalpanirjhar International Short Fiction Film Festival 2003." www.kalpanirjhar.com. 28 December 2013.
- Chatterjee, Saibal. "Celebration of Pure Cinema." www.thesundayindian.com. 28 December 2013.
- "A Unique Visual Treat in 35mm." The Times of India. 28 December 2013.
- Ballad of Rustom: Expectations Are Sky High from Ajitha and Crew. pressbox.co.uk. 27 December 2013.
- Nagarajan, Saraswathy. "Best of World Cinema (subscription required)." The Hindu. 28 December 2013
- "Sync Sound Recording in Ballad of Rustom Gives Us a Realistic Experience." Alllightsfilmmagazine. 28 December 2013.
