= HAL Ajeet =

Fighter aircraft in India

Ajeet
- The prototype Ajeet, E1083, preserved outside HAL's headquarters in Bangalore

General information
- Type: Fighter
- National origin: India
- Manufacturer: Hindustan Aeronautics Limited
- Status: Retired
- Primary user: Indian Air Force (IAF)
- Number built: 89 (including 10 upgraded Gnats)

History
- Introduction date: 1977
- First flight: 6 March 1975
- Retired: 1991
- Developed from: Folland Gnat

The HAL Ajeet (Sanskrit: अजीत; IAST: Ajīt, lit. Undefeatable or Unconquerable) was a jet-powered fighter aircraft developed and manufactured by Indian aerospace manufacturer Hindustan Aeronautics Limited (HAL). It was operated by the Indian Air Force (IAF) between 1977 and 1991.

The Ajeet is a derivative of the British Folland Gnat light fighter aircraft. The Gnat, which had been procured in large numbers for the IAF and produced under license by HAL, had acquitted itself favourably during its Indian service, including in active combat roles during multiple conflicts with Pakistan, including the Indo-Pakistani War of 1965 and the Indo-Pakistani War of 1971. As such, the IAF had a positive attitude towards the type, despite observing shortcomings in maintainability and some subsystems. Thus, during 1972, the service issued a requirement calling for the development of an upgraded and more capable variant of the Gnat, leading to the development of the Ajeet by HAL.

In the design phase of the Ajeet, HAL redesigned several aspects of the aircraft while seeking to improve both the reliability and effectiveness of several subsystems, such as the avionics and hydraulic systems. The adoption of a wet wing expanded the fighter's internal fuel capacity and freed-up several underwing hardpoints for other purposes, effectively increasing both the range and payload capability of the aircraft. On 6 March 1975, the first of two Ajeet prototypes, producing via the conversion of the final two licence-produced Gnat fighters, conducted its maiden flight. The satisfactory performance of these prototypes contributed to the issuing of a production order for the Ajeet. On 30 September 1976, the first production aircraft performed its maiden flight. Introduced to service during the following year, the Ajeet had a relatively brief and unremarkable service life, equipping only a single IAF squadron and being withdrawn from service in 1991.

== Development ==
=== Background ===
During the 1950s, the government of India had come to an agreement with the United Kingdom to procure a large number of Folland Gnat fighters, a light combat-capable jet-propelled aircraft, for the Indian Air Force (IAF). In addition to the acquisition of British-built Gnats, the type was also manufactured under a licensing arrangement in India by aviation company Hindustan Aeronautics Limited (HAL). During its production run, in excess of 200 aircraft were constructed by HAL for the IAF; as much as 85 per cent of the airframe and 60 per cent of the engine were domestically produced. Around 1958, the first Gnat fighter was accepted by the IAF into squadron service.

During its service life with the IAF, the Gnat proved to be relatively successful when deployed for active combat missions. The type was used in both the Indo-Pakistani Wars of 1965 and 1971 against neighbouring Pakistan. Operationally, it was used to conduct both low-level air superiority missions and to perform short range ground attack runs. Due to its effectiveness against Pakistani fighters, such the North American F-86 Sabre, the type was given the moniker of Sabre Slayer. The Gnat was ultimately operated by the IAF for several decades up until its retirement during the 1980s.

According to aviation author Pushpindar Chopra, the design of the Gnat had both positive and negative attributes; while being inexpensive to construct and to operate, several of the onboard systems had been allegedly prone to low levels of reliability, particularly the control system of the aircraft, while some aspects had proved to be difficult to maintain. The reliability issues had been a known contributing factor to several accidents which had resulted in the total loss of individual Gnats and the deaths of several pilots.

=== Programme launch ===
Accordingly, while the Gnat had been determined to be effective as a combat aircraft, it was also viewed that there was room for improvement on the design of its subsystems. During 1972, the IAF therefore issued a formal requirement, calling for the development and production of an improved model of the Gnat. Although the original revision of the requirement had called for the type to be produced to function as an interceptor, it was subsequently modified to incorporate a secondary ground-attack role for the new model as well. According to a report by the Public Accounts Committee of the Indian Parliament, the IAF officials tasked with overseeing the programme lacked realistic concepts of what was involved in the development process nor firm ideas on what the aircraft was required for.

In response to the issuing of the original requirement, HAL set about designing their revision of the Gnat. Their work was greatly aided by an earlier decision by India to, upon the liquidation of Folland Aircraft during the 1960s, acquire many former assets of the company. The residual rights for the type had been transferred to the IAF while other items, such as the jigs and test apparatus, had been moved to HAL. Early on, the fledgling aircraft design received the name "Ajeet", Sanskrit for "Invincible" or "Unconquered". As the design developed, differences between the Ajeet and the original model of the Gnat that had served as its starting point became considerable. During the development process, deliberate efforts were made to rectify the encountered shortcomings and troubles discovered within the design of the earlier Gnat.

In support of the development programme, HAL decided to modify the final pair of Gnats on the production line to serve as prototypes for the Ajeet. On 6 March 1975, the first of these prototypes conducted its maiden flight while the second prototype following on 5 November that year. The flight testing phase of the programme reportedly validated the success of the re-designed aircraft, leading to a production order being placed for the Ajeet. On 30 September 1976, the first production aircraft performed its maiden flight. Despite this, as late as 1979, additional development tasks and changing requirements were being added onto the programme; these were attributed by defense analyst Amit Gupta as having caused the Ajeet's associated costs to substantially rise as well as having led to setbacks in the programme's manufacturing effort.

=== Further development ===
During the late 1970s and early 1980s, HAL undertook work on a project intending to produce a training-oriented variant of the Ajeet. During 1982, this programme had progressed to the point where the initial flight of a prototype for evaluation purposes occurred. This sole aircraft was soon lost in a crash later that same year. The following year, a second prototype performed its maiden flight and was closely followed by a third.

However, information on the Ajeet trainer programme was received with a lack of interest on the part of the Indian government. IAF Air Commodore Jasjit Singh observed that there was little need for a trainer version of the Ajeet as the original Gnat had already been developed into a training aircraft and therefore could have been acquired already if the IAF had the desire to do so. The twin factors of the anticipated imminent phaseout of the Ajeet fighter and pessimism over the project's value from officials heavily contributed to the trainer initiative being curtailed without any further examples being produced. The two surviving aircraft were dispatched to briefly serve with the IAF's No.2 Squadron, where they were used until the phaseout of the Ajeet was completed in 1991.

== Design ==
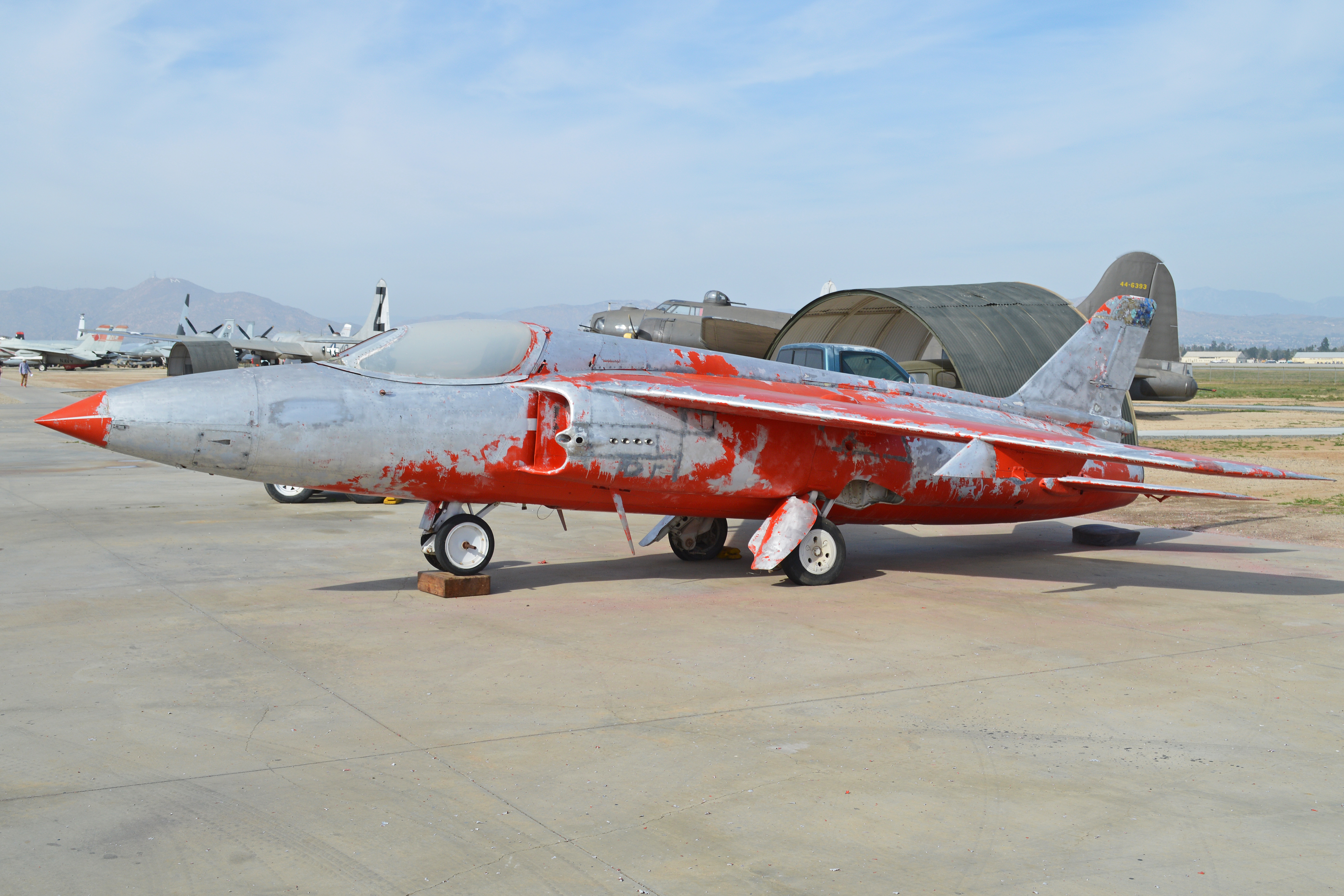
IAF Ajeet on undergoing cosmetic restoration, 2016

The HAL Ajeet was a jet-propelled light fighter, primarily intended to function as a low-level interceptor aircraft, while also being capable of ground-attack missions. Being a derivative of the earlier Gnat, the aircraft appeared to be visually similar to its predecessor; the presence of a pair of extra underwing hardpoints being amongst the only obvious distinguishing features from the older Gnat. In general, the Ajeet was equipped with a variety of more capable avionics and onboard systems than the original design. However, the addition of these extra subsystems and features was not without consequence, as the Ajeet was less agile than the original Gnat.

One of the more significant changes made for the Ajeet was the addition of a wet wing, housing aviation fuel in the interior space within the wing. This had several effects on the overall design, including the substantial expansion of its internal fuel capacity and the freeing up of several underwing hardpoints that had been previously occupied by external fuel tanks, allowing for their use in the carriage of other equipment and armaments. Furthermore, the carriage of even-greater payloads was also enabled via the installation of an additional pair of underwing hardpoints.

Certain aspects of the aircraft were heavily redesigned from the Gnat, such as the much enhanced hydraulic systems, the improved landing gear arrangement, and refined control systems, to produce superior performance, compared to their original counterparts. The control surfaces were enhanced via the adoption of a all-moving tail plane configuration, which was unique to the Ajeet. It was also decided to outfit the aircraft with improved Martin-Baker GF4 ejection seats for improved survivability.

== Operational history ==
During 1977, the HAL Ajeet was accepted into operational service with the IAF. However, only one squadron of the IAF ultimately operated the type, this being No.2 Squadron. According to political author Chris Smith, the lack of enthusiasm on the part of the IAF for the Ajeet was down to a change in attitudes; the service had allegedly become increasingly opposed to the use of single-engine aircraft while a preference for fighters capable of supersonic speeds had also grown, as such, the Ajeet contrasted poorly with these new priorities. However, also according to Smith, the Ajeet benefitted both from the positive combat reputation garnered by the Gnat, as well as for its relatively low radar cross-section (RCS).

Having fallen out of political favour, fewer than a hundred Ajeets were ultimately procured and the whole programme was effectively terminated barely a decade after its initiation. The aircraft built had relatively short and uneventful careers, and were retired from IAF service during 1991. The Ajeet was never deployed in combat operations.

== Variants ==
- Gnat Mk 2 : The original Indian Air Force designation for the Ajeet Mk 1.
- Ajeet Mk 1 : Single-seat lightweight ground-attack and interceptor fighter aircraft.
- Ajeet Mk 2 Trainer : Two-seat advanced jet training prototype.

== Operators ==
India

- Indian Air Force
  - No. 2 Squadron

== Surviving aircraft ==
Survivors are listed at List of surviving Folland Gnats.

== Specifications (HAL Ajeet) ==
Data from Jane's All The World's Aircraft 1982–83

General characteristics

- Crew: 1
- Length: 9.04 m (29 ft 8 in)
- Wingspan: 6.73 m (22 ft 1 in)
- Height: 2.46 m (8 ft 1 in)
- Wing area: 12.69 m^{2} (136.6 sq ft)
- Aspect ratio: 3.56
- Airfoil: RAE 102
- Empty weight: 2,307 kg (5,086 lb)
- Gross weight: 3,539 kg (7,802 lb) clean take-off weight
- Max takeoff weight: 4,173 kg (9,200 lb)
- Normal landing weight: 2,767 kg (6,100 lb)
- Powerplant: 1 × TJE HAL/Bristol Siddeley Orpheus 701-01 turbojet engine, 20 kN (4,500 lbf) thrust

Performance

- Maximum speed: 1,152 km/h (716 mph, 622 kn) at sea level ISA +30°

1,134 km/h (705 mph; 612 kn) at sea level ISA +15°
1,102 km/h (685 mph; 595 kn) at sea level ISA

- Maximum Mach number: M0.948 at 12,000 m (39,000 ft), ISA +30°

M0.953 at 12,000 m (39,000 ft), ISA +15°
M0.96 at 12,000 m (39,000 ft), ISA

- Combat range: 172 km (107 mi, 93 nmi) lo-lo-lo, with two 250 kg (551 lb) bombs
- Service ceiling: 13,720 m (45,000 ft)
- Time to altitude: 12,000 m (39,000 ft) in 6 minutes 2 seconds
- Wing loading: 328.8 kg/m^{2} (67.3 lb/sq ft) max
- Take-off run: 1,376 m (4,500 ft) ISA +30° at 4,136 kg (9,118 lb), 2x rocket pod and 2x drop tanks

1,180 m (3,870 ft) ISA +15° at 4,136 kg (9,118 lb), 2x rocket pod and 2x drop tanks
1,034 m (3,400 ft) ISA at 4,136 kg (9,118 lb), 2x rocket pod and 2x drop tanks

- Landing run no brake chute: 1,047 m (3,435 ft) ISA +30° at NLW

997 m (3,300 ft) ISA +15° at NLW
951 m (3,120 ft) ISA at NLW

- Landing run with brake chute: 725 m (2,379 ft) ISA +30° at NLW

695 m (2,280 ft) ISA +15° at NLW
658 m (2,200 ft) ISA at NLW

- Sustained turn: 5g - ISA +30° at 834 km/h (518 mph; 450 kn), sea level

5.28g - ISA +15° at 834 km/h (518 mph; 450 kn), sea level
5.3g ISA at 834 km/h (518 mph; 450 kn), sea level

Armament

- Guns: 2 × 30 mm (1.181 in) ADEN Mk.4 cannon with 90 rpg
- Hardpoints: 4 with a capacity of 900 kg (2,000 lb) total, with provisions to carry combinations of:
  - Rockets: rocket pods
  - Bombs: 2 × 250 kg (551 lb) bombs
  - Other: 2 × 136.5 L (36.1 US gal; 30.0 imp gal) drop tanks

Avionics

- Ferranti F195R/3 ISIS weapons sight
- Ferranti navigation system
- Vinten G90 gun camera
- Bendix TA/RA-22 VHF tx/Rx {V/UHF later)
- Bendix BEL AX-3 standby VHF
- Bendix DFA-73 ADF
- IFF Mk.10

== Notable appearances in media ==
An Ajeet and four privately owned Gnat T.1s portrayed the fictional carrier-based "Oscar EW-5894 Phallus" tactical fighter bombers flown by US Navy pilots in the 1991 comedy Hot Shots!.

== See also ==
Related development

- Folland Gnat
- Folland Midge

Aircraft of comparable role, configuration, and era

- Northrop F-5
- Northrop T-38 Talon
- T-33 Shooting Star

Related lists

- List of aircraft of the Royal Air Force
