= Ajith Kumar (biologist) =

Indian wildlife biologist and conservationist

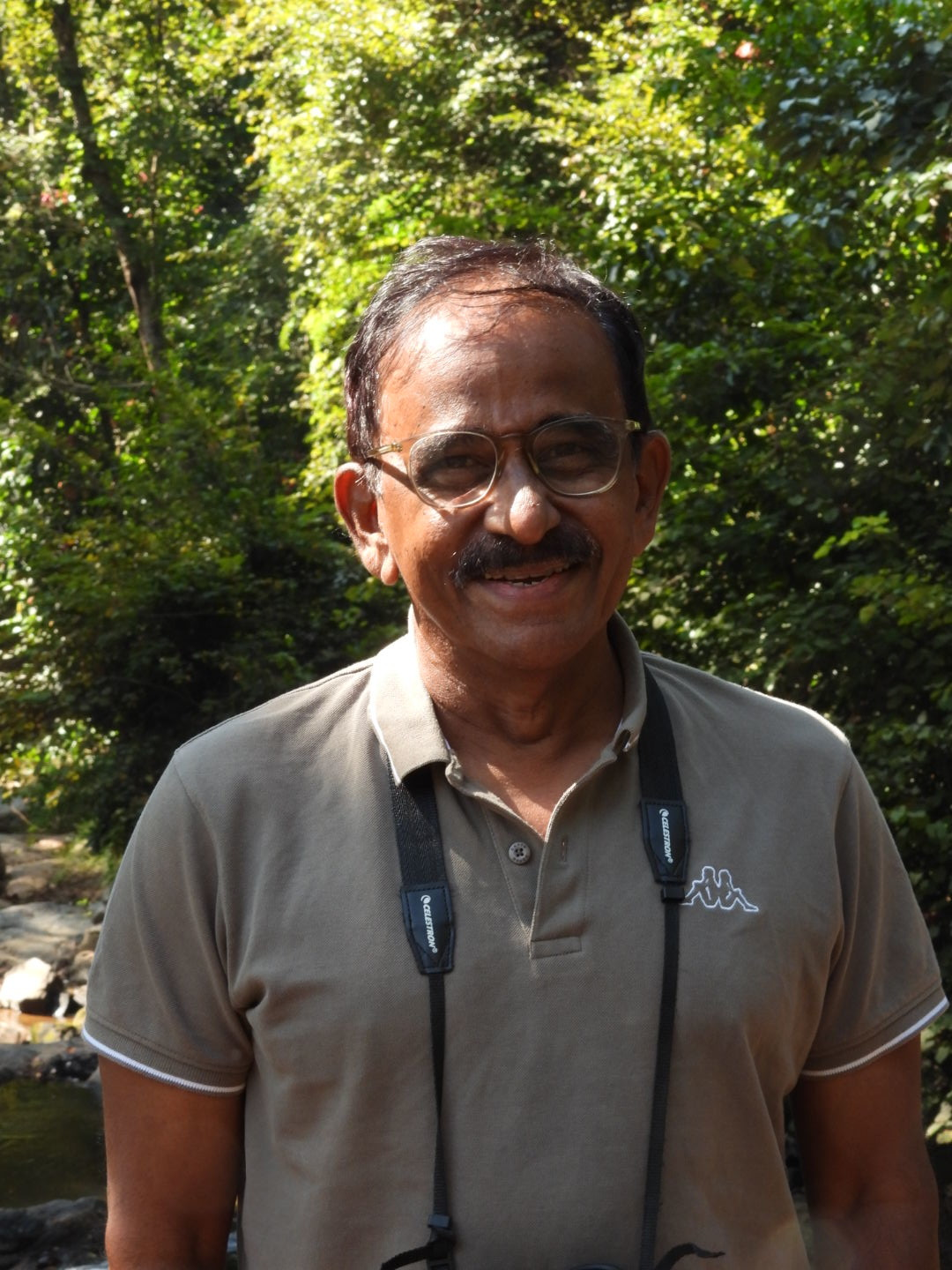
- Born: 1952
- Died: March 1, 2025 (aged 72–73); Pachmarhi, Madhya Pradesh, India
- Education: MSc in zoology, University of Kerala; PhD Cambridge University
- Occupation: Wildlife biology
- Years active: 1985–2025
- Employer(s): National Centre for Biological Sciences, Wildlife Institute of India, Centre for Wildlife Studies, Wildlife Conservation Society, Sálim Ali Centre for Ornithology and Natural History
- Known for: Wildlife biology
- Website: https://catalogue.archives.ncbs.res.in/reposiories/2/resources/17

Ajith Kumar (1952–March 1, 2025) was an Indian wildlife biologist and conservationist well known for his contributions to the ecology and conservation of primates such as the endangered lion-tailed macaque, and small mammals, with a career spanning over four decades of research, teaching and conservation. His work contributed significantly to the understanding of rainforest ecology, habitat fragmentation, and species conservation. Along with Ullas Karanth and other collaborators, he was instrumental in establishing a Masters course in wildlife biology and conservation at the National Centre for Biological Sciences, serving as the founding course director from its inception in 2004 till 2020. His early field notes and works have been archived in the NCBS Archives initiative, a public collecting centre for the history of science in contemporary India. He served as a member of the IUCN Primate Specialist Group which aims to "promote research on the ecology and conservation of hundreds of primate species".
