= Ajit Kumar Maiti =

Indian neurophysiologist

- Born: 26 April 1928 (age 97); India
- Known for: Spinal cord physiology; Electroencephalography
- Awards: 1971 Shanti Swarup Bhatnagar Prize
- Scientific career
- Fields: Neurophysiology
- Institutions: University of Maryland

Ajit Kumar Maiti (born 26 April 1928) is an Indian neurophysiologist associated with the University of Maryland. He is known for his pioneering researches on spinal cord physiology and his studies are reported to have widened the understanding of the role of spinal cord in regulating blood pressure and carbohydrate metabolism in human body. The Council of Scientific and Industrial Research, the apex agency of the Government of India for scientific research, awarded him the Shanti Swarup Bhatnagar Prize for Science and Technology, one of the highest Indian science awards for his contributions to Medical Sciences in 1971.
