= Ajith Amerasekera =

American electrical engineer

Ajith Amerasekera from the Texas Instruments Inc., in Dallas, TX was named Fellow of the Institute of Electrical and Electronics Engineers (IEEE) in 2012 for leadership in semiconductor innovation and contributions to circuit design.

Amerasekera was Chief Technical Officer for TI's ASIC Business Unit. His Ph.D. is in Electrical Engineering and Physics.
